= List of flag bearers for the Bahamas at the Olympics =

Bahamas at the Olympics
- Flag of the Bahamas
- IOC code: BAH
- NOC: Bahamas Olympic Committee
- Website: www.bahamasolympiccommittee.org
- Medals: Gold 8 Silver 2 Bronze 6 Total 16

Summer appearances
- 1952; 1956; 1960; 1964; 1968; 1972; 1976; 1980; 1984; 1988; 1992; 1996; 2000; 2004; 2008; 2012; 2016; 2020; 2024

This is a list of flag bearers who have represented Bahamas at the Olympics.

Flag bearers carry the national flag of their country at the opening ceremony of the Olympic Games.

#	Event year	Season	Flag bearer	Sport
1	1952	Summer		
2	1956	Summer		
3	1960	Summer	Harold Munnings	Official
4	1964	Summer		
5	1968	Summer		
6	1972	Summer	Mike Sands	Athletics
7	1976	Summer	Mike Sands	Athletics
8	1984	Summer	Brad Cooper	Athletics
9	1988	Summer	Durward Knowles	Sailing
10	1992	Summer		
11	1996	Summer	Frank Rutherford	Athletics
12	2000	Summer	Pauline Davis-Thompson	Athletics
13	2004	Summer	Debbie Ferguson-McKenzie	Athletics
14	2008	Summer	Debbie Ferguson-McKenzie	Athletics
15	2012	Summer	Chris Brown	Athletics
16	2016	Summer	Shaunae Miller	Athletics
17	2020	Summer	Joanna Evans	Swimming
17	2020	Summer	Donald Thomas	Athletics
18	2024	Summer	Devynne Charlton	Athletics
18	2024	Summer	Steven Gardiner	Athletics

== See also ==
- Bahamas at the Olympics
