= Bahamas at the 1988 Summer Paralympics =

- Flag of the Bahamas
- IPC code: BAH

in Seoul
- Competitors: 4
- Medals: Gold 0 Silver 0 Bronze 0 Total 0

Summer Paralympics appearances (overview)
- 1972; 1976; 1980; 1984; 1988; 1992–2024

Bahamas competed at the 1988 Summer Paralympics in Seoul, South Korea. 4 competitors from Bahamas won no medals and so did not place in the medal table.

== See also ==
- Bahamas at the Paralympics
- Bahamas at the 1988 Summer Olympics
