= Bahamas at the 1996 Summer Olympics =

- Flag of the Bahamas
- IOC code: BAH
- NOC: Bahamas Olympic Committee
- Website: www.bahamasolympiccommittee.org

in Atlanta
- Competitors: 26 (19 men and 7 women) in 4 sports
- Flag bearer: Frank Rutherford
- Medals Ranked 61st: Gold 0 Silver 1 Bronze 0 Total 1

Summer Olympics appearances (overview)
- 1952; 1956; 1960; 1964; 1968; 1972; 1976; 1980; 1984; 1988; 1992; 1996; 2000; 2004; 2008; 2012; 2016; 2020; 2024

The Bahamas was represented at the 1996 Summer Olympics in Atlanta, Georgia, United States by the Bahamas Olympic Committee.

In total, 26 athletes including 19 men and seven woman represented Bahamas in four different sports including athletics, sailing, swimming and tennis.

The Bahamas won one medal at the games after Eldece Clarke, Chandra Sturrup, Sevatheda Fynes, Pauline Davis and Debbie Ferguson jointly claimed silver in the women's 4 × 100 m relay.

== Competitors ==
In total, 26 athletes represented the Bahamas at the 1996 Summer Olympics in Atlanta, Georgia, United States across four different sports.

Sport	Men	Women	Total
Athletics	13	7	20
Sailing	3	0	3
Swimming	1	0	1
Tennis	2	0	2
Total	19	7	26

== Medalists ==
The Bahamas won one medal at the games after the women's women's 4 × 100 m relay team – made up of Eldece Clarke, Chandra Sturrup, Sevatheda Fynes, Pauline Davis and Debbie Ferguson – claimed silver.

== Athletics ==
In total, 20 Bahamian athletes participated in the athletics events – Eldece Clarke-Lewis, Theron Cooper, Dennis Darling, Pauline Davis-Thompson, Jackie Edwards, Laverne Eve, Dwight Ferguson, Debbie Ferguson-McKenzie, Savatheda Fynes, Troy Kemp, Iram Lewis, Troy McIntosh, Allan Mortimer, Tim Munnings, Carl Oliver, Chandra Sturrup, Joe Styles, Ian Thompson, Andrew Tynes and Renward Wells.

Athlete	Event	Heat		Quarterfinal		Semifinal		Final	
Athlete	Event	Result	Rank	Result	Rank	Result	Rank	Result	Rank
Troy McIntosh	Men's 400 m	46.42	4	Did not advance					
Carl Oliver	Men's 400 m	47.41	6	Did not advance					
Andrew Tynes	Men's 100 m	DNS		Did not advance					
Renward Wells	Men's 100 m	10.48	4	Did not advance					
Renward Wells; Dwight Ferguson; Iram Lewis; Andrew Tynes; Joe Styles	Men's 4 × 100 m relay	39.38	3 q	—N/a		DSQ		Did not advance	
Carl Oliver; Troy McIntosh; Dennis Darling; Tim Munnings; Theron Cooper	Men's 4 × 400 m relay	3:04.09	2 Q	—N/a		3:02.17	4 Q	3:02.71	7
Eldece Clarke-Lewis	Women's 100 m	11.33	4 Q	11.47	5	Did not advance			
Pauline Davis-Thompson	Women's 400 m	51.00	1 Q	51.08	2 Q	49.85	3 Q	49.28	4
Debbie Ferguson-McKenzie	Women's 100 m	11.33	4 Q	11.26	3 Q	11.28	7	Did not advance	
Savatheda Fynes	Women's 200 m	23.39	6 q	23.26	6	Did not advance			
Chandra Sturrup	Women's 100 m	11.24	1 Q	11.21	2 Q	11.07	4 Q	11.00	4
Chandra Sturrup	Women's 200 m	22.63	2 Q	22.81	2 Q	22.54	3 Q	22.54	6
Eldece Clarke-Lewis; Chandra Sturrup; Savatheda Fynes; Pauline Davis-Thompson; Debbie Ferguson-McKenzie*	Women's 4 × 100 m relay	43.14	2 Q	—N/a				42.14	2nd place, silver medalist(s)

Athlete	Event	Qualification		Final	
Athlete	Event	Distance	Position	Distance	Position
Troy Kemp	Men's high jump	2.28	3 Q	2.25	13
Allan Mortimer	Men's triple jump	16.73	12 q	16.38	11
Ian Thompson	Men's high jump	2.26	20	Did not advance	
Laverne Eve	Women's javelin throw	58.48	17	Did not advance	
Jackie Edwards	Women's long jump	6.55	15	Did not advance	

== Sailing ==
In total, three Bahamian athletes participated in the sailing events – Robert Dunkley in the laser and Mark Holowesko and Myles Pritchard in the star.

Athlete	Event	Race											Net points	Final rank
Athlete	Event	1	2	3	4	5	6	7	8	9	10	11	Net points	Final rank
Robert Dunkley	Laser	~~48~~	41	46	41	45	~~46~~	43	43	41	42	37	379.0	47
Mark Holowesko; Myles Pritchard	Star	20	11	15	20	~~21~~	18	12	~~23~~	20	12	—N/a	128.0	19

== Swimming ==
In total, one Bahamian athlete participated in the swimming events – Allan Murray in the men's 50 m freestyle.

Athlete	Event	Heat		Final B		Final	
Athlete	Event	Time	Rank	Time	Rank	Time	Rank
Allan Murray	50 m freestyle	22.75 (NR)	11	22.92	12	Did not advance	

== Tennis ==
In total, two Bahamian athletes participated in the tennis events – Mark Knowles and Roger Smith.

Athlete	Event	Round of 32	Round of 16	Quarterfinals	Semifinals	Final / BM	
Athlete	Event	Opposition Score	Opposition Score	Opposition Score	Opposition Score	Opposition Score	Rank
Mark Knowles	Men's singles	Carlsen (DEN); L 5–7, 3–6	Did not advance				
Mark Knowles; Roger Smith	Men's doubles	Couto / Mota (POR); W 7-6 (8–6), 7-6 (7–4)	S Hiršzon / G Ivanišević (CRO); L 6-7 (4–7), 3–6	Did not advance			

== See also ==
- Bahamas at the 1995 Pan American Games
