= Bahamas at the Olympics =

- Flag of the Bahamas
- IOC code: BAH
- NOC: Bahamas Olympic Committee
- Website: www.bahamasolympiccommittee.org
- Medals Ranked 66th: Gold 8 Silver 2 Bronze 6 Total 16

Summer appearances
- 1952; 1956; 1960; 1964; 1968; 1972; 1976; 1980; 1984; 1988; 1992; 1996; 2000; 2004; 2008; 2012; 2016; 2020; 2024

The Bahamas first participated at the Olympic Games in 1952, and has sent athletes to compete in every Summer Olympic Games since then, except when they participated in the American-led boycott of the 1980 Summer Olympics. The nation has never participated in the Winter Olympic Games.

Bahamian athletes have won a total of sixteen medals, all in athletics and sailing. The Bahamas has won more Olympic medals than any other country with a population under one million.

The National Olympic Committee for The Bahamas is the Bahamas Olympic Committee, and was created in 1952.

== Medal tables ==
=== Medals by Summer Games ===
Games	Athletes	Gold	Silver	Bronze	Total	Rank
1952 Helsinki	7	0	0	0	0	–
1956 Melbourne	4	0	0	1	1	35
1960 Rome	13	0	0	0	0	–
1964 Tokyo	11	1	0	0	1	24
1968 Mexico City	16	0	0	0	0	–
1972 Munich	20	0	0	0	0	–
1976 Montreal	11	0	0	0	0	–
1980 Moscow	boycotted					
1984 Los Angeles	22	0	0	0	0	–
1988 Seoul	16	0	0	0	0	–
1992 Barcelona	14	0	0	1	1	54
1996 Atlanta	26	0	1	0	1	61
2000 Sydney	25	2	0	1	3	34
2004 Athens	22	1	0	1	2	52
2008 Beijing	25	0	1	1	2	64
2012 London	24	1	0	0	1	50
2016 Rio de Janeiro	28	1	0	1	2	50
2020 Tokyo	16	2	0	0	2	42
2024 Paris	18	0	0	0	0	–
2028 Los Angeles	future event					
2032 Brisbane	future event					
Total		8	2	6	16	66

=== Medals by sport ===
Sport	Gold	Silver	Bronze	Total
Athletics	7	2	5	14
Sailing	1	0	1	2
Totals (2 entries)	8	2	6	16

== List of medalists ==
Medal	Name	Games	Sport	Event
Bronze	Durward Knowles; Sloane Farrington	1956 Melbourne	Sailing	Star class
Gold	Durward Knowles; Cecil Cooke	1964 Tokyo	Sailing	Star class
Bronze	Frank Rutherford	1992 Barcelona	Athletics	Men's triple jump
Silver	Debbie Ferguson; Eldece Clarke-Lewis; Chandra Sturrup; Savatheda Fynes; Pauline Davis-Thompson	1996 Atlanta	Athletics	Women's 4 × 100 metres relay
Gold	Savatheda Fynes; Chandra Sturrup; Pauline Davis-Thompson; Debbie Ferguson; Eldece Clarke-Lewis	2000 Sydney	Athletics	Women's 4 × 100 metres relay
Gold	Pauline Davis-Thompson	2000 Sydney	Athletics	Women's 200 metres
Bronze	Avard Moncur; Troy McIntosh; Carl Oliver; Chris Brown; Timothy Munnings	2000 Sydney	Athletics	Men's 4 × 400 metres relay
Gold	Tonique Williams-Darling	2004 Athens	Athletics	Women's 400 metres
Bronze	Debbie Ferguson	2004 Athens	Athletics	Women's 200 metres
Silver	Andretti Bain; Michael Mathieu; Andrae Williams; Chris Brown	2008 Beijing	Athletics	Men's 4 × 400 metres relay
Bronze	Leevan Sands	2008 Beijing	Athletics	Men's triple jump
Gold	Michael Mathieu; Ramon Miller; Chris Brown; Demetrius Pinder	2012 London	Athletics	Men's 4 × 400 metres relay
Gold	Shaunae Miller	2016 Rio de Janeiro	Athletics	Women's 400 metres
Bronze	Michael Mathieu; Alonzo Russell; Chris Brown; Steven Gardiner; Stephen Newbold	2016 Rio de Janeiro	Athletics	Men's 4 × 400 metres relay
Gold	Steven Gardiner	2020 Tokyo	Athletics	Men's 400 metres
Gold	Shaunae Miller-Uibo	2020 Tokyo	Athletics	Women's 400 metres

== Flagbearers ==
Summer Olympics

Games	Athlete	Sport
1972 Munich	Mike Sands	Athletics
1976 Montreal	Mike Sands	Athletics
1980 Moscow	did not participate	
1984 Los Angeles	Bradley Cooper	Athletics
1988 Seoul	Durward Knowles	Sailing
1992 Barcelona		
1996 Atlanta	Frank Rutherford	Athletics
2000 Sydney	Pauline Davis-Thompson	Athletics
2004 Athens	Debbie Ferguson-McKenzie	Athletics
2008 Beijing	Debbie Ferguson-McKenzie	Athletics
2012 London	Chris Brown	Athletics
2016 Rio de Janeiro	Shaunae Miller	Athletics
2020 Tokyo	Joanna Evans; Donald Thomas	Swimming; Athletics
2024 Paris	Devynne Charlton; Steven Gardiner	Athletics

== See also ==
- Bahamas at the Paralympics
