= Bahamas at the 1972 Summer Paralympics =

- Flag of the Bahamas
- IPC code: BAH

in Heidelberg
- Competitors: 1 in 1 sport
- Medals Ranked -th: Gold 0 Silver 0 Bronze 0 Total 0

Summer Paralympics appearances (overview)
- 1972; 1976; 1980; 1984; 1988; 1992–2024

The Bahamas made its Paralympic Games début at the 1972 Summer Paralympics in Heidelberg, West Germany. The country's delegation consisted in a single athlete, John Sands. Sands competed in one event: the men's 60m wheelchair sprint, in category 1B. He completed his race in 34.8s, which placed him 22nd overall in the heats, and did not enable him to advance to the final. The event was ultimately won by West German athlete Baumgartner (full name not recorded), in 19s.

== Athletics ==
Athlete	Events	Heat		Final	
Athlete	Events	Result	Rank	Result	Rank
John Sands	Men's 60 metres wheelchair 1B	34.8s	22	Did not advance	

== See also ==
- Bahamas at the 1972 Summer Olympics
