= Bahamas at the 1984 Summer Paralympics =

- Flag of the Bahamas
- IPC code: BAH

in Stoke Mandeville/New York
- Competitors: 2
- Medals Ranked 41st: Gold 0 Silver 1 Bronze 1 Total 2

Summer Paralympics appearances (overview)
- 1972; 1976; 1980; 1984; 1988; 1992–2024

Bahamas competed at the 1984 Summer Paralympics in Stoke Mandeville, Great Britain and New York City, United States. 2 competitors from Bahamas won 2 medals including 1 silver and 1 bronze and finished joint 41st in the medal table with Indonesia.

== See also ==
- Bahamas at the Paralympics
- Bahamas at the 1984 Summer Olympics
