= Bahamas at the 1960 Summer Olympics =

- Flag of the Bahamas
- IOC code: BAH
- NOC: Bahamas Olympic Committee

in Rome
- Competitors: 13 (13 men and 0 women) in 2 sports
- Flag bearer: Harold Munnings
- Medals: Gold 0 Silver 0 Bronze 0 Total 0

Summer Olympics appearances (overview)
- 1952; 1956; 1960; 1964; 1968; 1972; 1976; 1980; 1984; 1988; 1992; 1996; 2000; 2004; 2008; 2012; 2016; 2020; 2024

The Bahamas competed at the 1960 Summer Olympics in Rome, Italy.

== Athletics ==
Men
Track & road events

Athlete	Event	Heat		Quarterfinal		Semifinal		Final	
Athlete	Event	Result	Rank	Result	Rank	Result	Rank	Result	Rank
Hugh Bullard	400 m	51.20	6	did not advance					
Tom Robinson	100 m	10.68	1 Q	10.76	2 Q	10.69	5	did not advance	
Tom Robinson	200 m	21.56	2 Q	21.32	3 Q	21.67	5	did not advance	

== Sailing ==
Open

Athlete	Event	Race							Net points	Final rank
Athlete	Event	1	2	3	4	5	6	7	Net points	Final rank
Kenneth Albury	Finn	12	~~29~~	11	5	1	7	13	5092	8
Godfrey Lightbourn; Sigmund Pritchard	Flying Dutchman	15	~~DNF~~	25	22	26	22	24	1499	25
Durward Knowles; Sloan Farrington	Star	11	1	3	~~14~~	11	3	6	5282	6
Godfrey Kelly; Maurice Kelly; Percy Knowles	Dragon	18	~~21~~	17	17	8	13	20	2159	18
Robert Symonette; Basil Kelly; Roy Ramsay	5.5 Metre	7	13	11	~~15~~	6	2	15	3024	8

== See also ==
- Bahamas at the 1959 Pan American Games

== Sources ==
- Official Olympic Reports
- sports-reference
