= Bahamas at the 1964 Summer Olympics =

- Flag of the Bahamas
- IOC code: BAH
- NOC: Bahamas Olympic Committee

in Tokyo
- Competitors: 11 (11 men and 0 women) in 2 sports
- Medals Ranked 24th: Gold 1 Silver 0 Bronze 0 Total 1

Summer Olympics appearances (overview)
- 1952; 1956; 1960; 1964; 1968; 1972; 1976; 1980; 1984; 1988; 1992; 1996; 2000; 2004; 2008; 2012; 2016; 2020; 2024

The Bahamas competed at the 1964 Summer Olympics in Tokyo, Japan. The nation won its first ever Olympic gold medal.

== Medalists ==
Medal	Name	Sport	Event
Gold	Durward Knowles; Cecil Cooke	Sailing	Star

== Athletics ==
Men
Track & road events

Athlete	Event	Heat		Quarterfinal		Semifinal		Final	
Athlete	Event	Result	Rank	Result	Rank	Result	Rank	Result	Rank
Tom Robinson	100 m	10.50	1 Q	10.38	1 Q	10.22	2 Q	10.57	8
George Collie	100 m	10.90	5	did not advance					
George Collie	200 m	21.91	5	did not advance					

Field events

Athlete	Event	Qualification		Final	
Athlete	Event	Distance	Position	Distance	Position
Hartley Saunders	Triple jump	14.59	29	did not advance	

== Sailing ==
Open

Athlete	Event	Race							Net points	Final rank
Athlete	Event	1	2	3	4	5	6	7	Net points	Final rank
Durward Knowles; Cecil Cooke	Star	1	5	~~DNF~~	6	1	1	7	5664	Gold medal
Godfrey Kelly; Maurice Kelly; Robert Eardley	Dragon	~~16~~	13	13	4	5	9	1	4294	7
Robert Symonette; Roy Ramsay; Percy Knowles	5.5 Metre	9	~~13~~	11	3	3	10	10	2713	9

== See also ==
- Bahamas at the 1963 Pan American Games
