= Bahamas at the 1956 Summer Olympics =

- Flag of the Bahamas
- IOC code: BAH
- NOC: Bahamas Olympic Committee

in Melbourne
- Competitors: 4 (4 men and 0 women) in 2 sports
- Medals Ranked 35th: Gold 0 Silver 0 Bronze 1 Total 1

Summer Olympics appearances (overview)
- 1952; 1956; 1960; 1964; 1968; 1972; 1976; 1980; 1984; 1988; 1992; 1996; 2000; 2004; 2008; 2012; 2016; 2020; 2024; 2028

The Bahamas competed at the 1956 Summer Olympics that took place between 22 November to 8 December in Melbourne, Australia. This was the Bahamas' second appearance at the Summer Olympics, since its debut at the 1952 Summer Olympics in Helsinki. The Bahamas delegation consisted of four athletes competing in two sports, and won a lone bronze medal in Sailing, the first ever Summer Olympics medal for Bahamas.

== Background ==
The Bahamas Olympic Association was established on 7 May 1952 and was recognized by the International Olympic Committee (IOC) in the same year. British Bahamas made its first Olympic appearance at the 1952 Summer Olympics in Helsinki. The 1956 Summer Olympics was its second consecutive appearance at the Summer Olympics.

The 1956 Summer Olympics was held in Melbourne, Australia, between 22 November and 8 December 1956. However, the Equestrian events were held in Stockholm, Sweden as Australian law did not allow the import of horses for the event. Bahamas won a lone bronze medal in Sailing, its first ever medal in the Summer Olympics.

== Medalists ==
Medal	Name	Sport	Event
Bronze	Sloane Farrington; Durward Knowles	Sailing	Star

== Competitors ==
The Bahamas delegation consisted of four athletes.

Sport	Men	Women	Total
Athletics	1	0	1
Sailing	3	0	3
Total	4	0	4

== Athletics ==
Tom Robinson represented Bahamas in the men's 100 m and men's 200 m events. This was the first ever Olympic participation for Bahamas in the athletics events.

The athletics events were held at the Melbourne Cricket Ground in Melbourne. In the 100 metres event, Robinson finished fourth in the fifth preliminary heat with a time of 10.9 seconds, and failed to advance to the quarterfinals. In the 200 metres event held on 26 November 1956, he came fourth in his preliminary heat with a time of 21.6 seconds, and did not advance further.

Track & road events

Athlete	Event	Heat		Quarterfinal		Semifinal		Final	
Athlete	Event	Result	Rank	Result	Rank	Result	Rank	Result	Rank
Tom Robinson	Men's 100 m	10.9	4	Did not advance					
Tom Robinson	Men's 200 m	21.6	4	Did not advance					

== Sailing ==
Three athletes represented Bahamas in the Sailing events. Bahamas made its debut in the Sailing events in the Olympics at the Games.

The sailing events were held at the Port Phillip Bay in Melbourne. In sailing events, points were awarded based on placement in each race. The best six scores out of the seven races are counted for final placement.

Kenneth Albury competed in the one person dinghy (Finn) event, which made its debut in the Olympic programme in the 1952 Games. He finished 14th out of the 28 competitors with 3,209 points. Durward Knowles and Sloan Farrington competed in the two person keelboat (Star) event, and won a bronze medal, with 5223 points.

Open

Athlete	Event	Race							Net points	Final rank
Athlete	Event	1	2	3	4	5	6	7	Net points	Final rank
Kenneth Albury	Finn	~~DNF~~	15	10	13	7	8	11	3029	14
Durward Knowles; Sloan Farrington	Star	2	2	~~5~~	2	1	3	3	5223	Bronze medal

== See also ==
- Bahamas at the 1955 Pan American Games
