= Bahamas at the 1980 Summer Paralympics =

- Flag of the Bahamas
- IPC code: BAH

in Arnhem
- Competitors: 6 in 2 sports
- Medals Ranked 36th: Gold 0 Silver 1 Bronze 2 Total 3

Summer Paralympics appearances (overview)
- 1972; 1976; 1980; 1984; 1988; 1992–2024

The Bahamas competed at the 1980 Summer Paralympics in Arnhem, Netherlands. The country's delegation consisted of six competitors in two sports, track and field athletics, and swimming. Two of the athletes, Christine Morgan and Olivia Armbrister, competed in both sports.

== Medalists ==
| Medal | Name | Sport | Event |
|---|---|---|---|
| Silver | John Sands | Athletics | Men's club throw 1B |
| Bronze | John Sands | Athletics | Men's discus throw 1B |
| Bronze | Christine Morgan | Swimming | Women's 100 metre freestyle 6 |

== Athletics ==
| Athlete | Events | Heat | | Final | |
| Athlete | Events | Result | Rank | Result | Rank |
|---|---|---|---|---|---|
| Paul Amoury | Men's 100 m 4 | 35.64 | 5 | Did not advance | |
| Paul Amoury | Men's 800 m 4 | 5:24.60 | 5 | Did not advance | |
| Paul Amoury | Men's slalom 4 | Disqualified | | Did not advance | |
| Olivia Armbrister | Women's 60 m 5 | 21.52 | 4 | Did not advance | |
| Olivia Armbrister | Women's discus throw 5 | N/A | | 13.94 | 8 |
| Olivia Armbrister | Women's javelin throw 5 | N/A | | 11.32 | 5 |
| Olivia Armbrister | Women's shot put 5 | N/A | | 5.92 | 7 |
| Elizabeth Burrows | Women's discus throw 4 | N/A | | 9.68 | 11 |
| Elizabeth Burrows | Women's shot put 4 | N/A | | 3.42 | 13 |
| Elizabeth Burrows | Women's slalom 3 | 1:57.72 | 9 | Did not advance | |
| Christine Morgan | Women's 60 m 5 | 20.87 | 6 | Did not advance | |
| Christine Morgan | Women's discus throw 5 | N/A | | 13.50 | 10 |
| Christine Morgan | Women's javelin throw 5 | N/A | | 9.42 | 10 |
| Christine Morgan | Women's shot put 5 | N/A | | 4.92 | 11 |
| Charlene Poitier | Women's 60 m 3 | 19.04 | 5 | Did not advance | |
| Charlene Poitier | Women's discus throw 3 | N/A | | 11.32 | 12 |
| Charlene Poitier | Women's javelin throw 3 | N/A | | 10.12 | 11 |
| Charlene Poitier | Women's shot put 3 | N/A | | 3.96 | 16 |
| Charlene Poitier | Women's slalom 3 | 1:31.90 | 7 | Did not advance | |
| John Sands | Men's shot put 1B | N/A | | 5.59 | 4 |
| John Sands | Men's discus throw 1B | 12.26 | 3 | 12.26 | Bronze medal |
| John Sands | Men's club throw 1B | N/A | | 25.10 | Silver medal |

== Swimming ==
| Athlete | Events | Heat | | Final | |
| Athlete | Events | Time | Rank | Time | Rank |
|---|---|---|---|---|---|
| Olivia Armbrister | Women's 100 m freestyle 5 | N/A | | 2:13.06 | 7 |
| Christine Morgan | Women's 100 m freestyle 6 | N/A | | 2:01.98 | Bronze medal |
