= Bahamas at the 1968 Summer Olympics =

- Flag of the Bahamas
- IOC code: BAH
- NOC: Bahamas Olympic Committee

in Mexico City
- Competitors: 16 (16 men and 0 women) in 3 sports
- Medals: Gold 0 Silver 0 Bronze 0 Total 0

Summer Olympics appearances (overview)
- 1952; 1956; 1960; 1964; 1968; 1972; 1976; 1980; 1984; 1988; 1992; 1996; 2000; 2004; 2008; 2012; 2016; 2020; 2024

The Bahamas competed at the 1968 Summer Olympics in Mexico City, Mexico.

== Athletics ==
Men
Track & road events

Athlete	Event	Heat		Quarterfinal		Semifinal		Final	
Athlete	Event	Result	Rank	Result	Rank	Result	Rank	Result	Rank
Edwin Johnson	200 m	21.2	6 Q	21.4	7	did not advance			
Leslie Miller	400 m	46.9	7	did not advance					
Norris Stubbs	100 m	10.60	5	did not advance					
Norris Stubbs	200 m	21.6	6	did not advance					
Bernard Nottage	100 m	10.6	4	did not advance					
Bernard Nottage	200 m	21.3	4	did not advance					
Gerald Wisdom; Thomas Robinson; Bernard Nottage; Edwin Johnson; Norris Stubbs	4 × 100 m relay	39.4	4 Q	—		DSQ		did not advance	

Field events

Athlete	Event	Qualification		Final	
Athlete	Event	Distance	Position	Distance	Position
Anthony Balfour	High jump	1.95	36	did not advance	
Timothy Barrett	Triple jump	15.79	20	did not advance	
Gerald Wisdom	Long jump	6.99	30	did not advance	

== Sailing ==
Open

Athlete	Event	Race							Net points	Final rank
Athlete	Event	1	2	3	4	5	6	7	Net points	Final rank
Kenneth Albury	Finn	22	23	26	31	24	15	~~DNS~~	177	28
Durward Knowles; Percy Knowles	Star	6	~~DNS~~	2	3	4	9	14	63.4	5
Godfrey Kelly; George Ramsey; David Kelly	Dragon	~~DNF~~	DNF	17	14	9	9	10	117	16

== Wrestling ==
Men's freestyle

Athlete	Event	Elimination Pool						Final round	
Athlete	Event	Round 1 Result	Round 2 Result	Round 3 Result	Round 4 Result	Round 5 Result	Round 6 Result	Final round Result	Rank
Robert Nihon	−87 kg	Boris Gurevitch (URS); L F	Ronald Grinstead (GBR); L F	did not advance					20
Alexis Nihon, Jr.	−97 kg	Ryszard Dlugosz (POL); L F	Biianmunkh Khorloogyn (MGL); L F	did not advance					15

== See also ==
- Bahamas at the 1967 Pan American Games
