= Bahamas at the 1976 Summer Paralympics =

- Flag of the Bahamas
- IPC code: BAH

in Toronto
- Medals Ranked 34th: Gold 0 Silver 0 Bronze 0 Total 0

Summer Paralympics appearances (overview)
- 1972; 1976; 1980; 1984; 1988; 1992–2024

Bahamas sent a delegation to compete at the 1976 Summer Paralympics in Toronto, Ontario, Canada. Its athletes failed in winning any medal and finished last along 7 other countries.

== See also ==
- 1976 Summer Paralympics
- Bahamas at the 1976 Summer Olympics
