= Bahamas at the 1952 Summer Olympics =

- Flag of the Bahamas
- IOC code: BAH
- NOC: Bahamas Olympic Committee

in Helsinki
- Competitors: 7 (7 men and 0 women) in 1 sport
- Medals: Gold 0 Silver 0 Bronze 0 Total 0

Summer Olympics appearances (overview)
- 1952; 1956; 1960; 1964; 1968; 1972; 1976; 1980; 1984; 1988; 1992; 1996; 2000; 2004; 2008; 2012; 2016; 2020; 2024

The Bahamas competed in the Summer Olympic Games for the first time at the 1952 Summer Olympics in Helsinki, Finland. Only seven men went to Helsinki to compete in the sailing, all seven were affiliated with Nassau Yacht Club.

Durward Knowles and Sloane Farrington had both competed at the 1948 Olympics for Great Britain, due to the Bahamas not being recognised by the IOC.

== Sailing ==
Athlete	Event	Race							Points	Final Rank
Athlete	Event	1	2	3	4	5	6	7	Points	Final Rank
Kenneth Albury	Finn	DNF	15	10	13	7	8	11	3209	14
Durward Knowles; Sloane Farrington	Star	3	6	6	10	2	7	9	4828	5
Donald Pritchard; Basil McKinney; Basil Kelly; Godfrey Higgs	5.5	15	12	13	9	12	16	10	1529	15
