= Nottage (surname) =

Nottage is a surname. Notable people with the surname include:

- Bernard Nottage (1945-2017), Bahamian track and field athlete, politician, gynecologist
- Dexter Nottage (born 1970), American football player
- Lynn Nottage (born 1964), American playwright
- Sean Nottage (born 1965), Bahamian swimmer
