= Bahamas at the 2020 Summer Olympics =

- Flag of the Bahamas
- IOC code: BAH
- NOC: Bahamas Olympic Committee
- Website: www.bahamasolympiccommittee.org

in Tokyo, Japan July 23, 2021 – August 8, 2021
- Competitors: 15 in 2 sports
- Flag bearers (opening): Joanna Evans; Donald Thomas
- Flag bearer (closing): Megan Moss
- Medals Ranked 42nd: Gold 2 Silver 0 Bronze 0 Total 2

Summer Olympics appearances (overview)
- 1952; 1956; 1960; 1964; 1968; 1972; 1976; 1980; 1984; 1988; 1992; 1996; 2000; 2004; 2008; 2012; 2016; 2020; 2024

The Bahamas, officially the Commonwealth of The Bahamas, competed at the 2020 Summer Olympics in Tokyo, Japan. Originally scheduled to take place from 24 July to 9 August 2020, the Games have been postponed to 23 July to 8 August 2021, because of the COVID-19 pandemic. It was the nation's eighteenth consecutive appearance at the Summer Olympics.

== Medalists ==
Medal	Name	Sport	Event	Date
Gold	Steven Gardiner	Athletics	Men's 400 metres	August 5
Gold	Shaunae Miller-Uibo	Athletics	Women's 400 metres	August 6

== Competitors ==
The following is the list of number of competitors in the Games.

Sport	Men	Women	Total
Athletics	5	8	13
Swimming	1	1	2
Total	6	9	15

== Athletics ==
Bahamian athletes achieved the entry standards, either by qualifying time or by world ranking, in the following track and field events (up to a maximum of 3 athletes in each event):

Key

- Note–Ranks given for track events are within the athlete's heat only
- Q = Qualified for the next round
- q = Qualified for the next round as a fastest loser or, in field events, by position without achieving the qualifying target
- NR = National record
- N/A = Round not applicable for the event
- Bye = Athlete not required to compete in round

Track & road events
Men

Athlete	Event	Heat		Quarterfinal		Semifinal		Final	
Athlete	Event	Result	Rank	Result	Rank	Result	Rank	Result	Rank
Samson Colebrooke	100 m	Bye		10:33	7	Did not advance			
Steven Gardiner	400 m	45.05	1 Q	—N/a		44.14 SB	1 Q	43.85 SB	1st place, gold medalist(s)
Alonzo Russell	400 m	45.51 SB	5 q	—N/a		46.04	7	Did not advance	

Women

Athlete	Event	Heat		Quarterfinal		Semifinal		Final	
Athlete	Event	Result	Rank	Result	Rank	Result	Rank	Result	Rank
Tynia Gaither	100 m	Bye		11.34	3 Q	11.31	6	Did not advance	
Shaunae Miller-Uibo	200 m	22.40	2 Q	—N/a		22.14	2 Q	24.00	8
Anthonique Strachan	200 m	22.76 =SB	1 Q	—N/a		22.56 SB	3	Did not advance	
Shaunae Miller-Uibo	400 m	50.50	1 Q	—N/a		49.60	1 Q	48.36 AR	1st place, gold medalist(s)
Devynne Charlton	100 m hurdles	12.84	4 Q	—N/a		12.66	2 Q	12.74	6
Pedrya Seymour	100 m hurdles	13.04	4 Q	—N/a		13.09	8	Did not advance	
Doneisha Anderson; Brianne Bethel; Megan Moss; Anthonique Strachan	4 × 400 m relay	DNF		—N/a				Did not advance	

Field events

Athlete	Event	Qualification		Final	
Athlete	Event	Distance	Position	Distance	Position
Jamal Wilson	Men's high jump	2.17	32	Did not advance	
Donald Thomas	Men's high jump	2.21	25	Did not advance	

== Swimming ==
The Bahamas received a universality invitation from FINA to send two top-ranked swimmers (one per gender) in their respective individual events to the Olympics, based on the FINA Points System of June 28, 2021.

Athlete	Event	Heat		Semifinal		Final	
Athlete	Event	Time	Rank	Time	Rank	Time	Rank
Izaak Bastian	Men's 100 m breaststroke	1:01.87	40	Did not advance			
Izaak Bastian	Men's 200 m breaststroke	2:17.40	36	Did not advance			
Joanna Evans	Women's 200 m freestyle	1:58.40	18	Did not advance			
Joanna Evans	Women's 400 m freestyle	4:07.50	13	—N/a		Did not advance	

== See also ==
- Bahamas at the 2019 Pan American Games
