= Bahamas at the 2004 Summer Olympics =

- Flag of the Bahamas
- IOC code: BAH
- NOC: Bahamas Olympic Committee
- Website: www.bahamasolympiccommittee.org

in Athens
- Competitors: 22 in 3 sports
- Flag bearer: Debbie Ferguson
- Medals Ranked 52nd: Gold 1 Silver 0 Bronze 1 Total 2

Summer Olympics appearances (overview)
- 1952; 1956; 1960; 1964; 1968; 1972; 1976; 1980; 1984; 1988; 1992; 1996; 2000; 2004; 2008; 2012; 2016; 2020; 2024

The Bahamas competed at the 2004 Summer Olympics in Athens, Greece, from 13 to 29 August 2004. This was the nation's fourteenth appearance at the Olympics, except the 1980 Summer Olympics in Moscow because of the United States boycott.

The Bahamas Olympic Association sent a total of 22 athletes, 13 men and 9 women, to compete only in athletics (the nation's strongest field), swimming, and tennis. The Bahamian team featured numerous athletes who entered the Games as medal contenders in their respective events, including Tonique Williams-Darling, Chandra Sturrup, Debbie Ferguson, and Chris Brown. Sprinter Debbie Ferguson, who helped the Bahamian team claim their first gold medal in the women's 4 × 100 m relay, was appointed by the association to carry the nation's flag in the opening ceremony.

Bahamas left Athens with a total of two individual Olympic medals (a gold and a bronze), summing it up to a stark tally of eight with six more from Sydney. The highlight of the Games for the Bahamian athletes came with a prestigious Olympic gold from Tonique Williams-Darling in the women's 400 metres on August 24, 2004. Meanwhile, Ferguson added a bronze to her career hardware in the women's 200 metres by the following day. Being the oldest athlete to reach the final at age 28, she was quoted after the race as saying "I think per capita, the Bahamas already won the Olympics", referring to the 2 medals won for the nation of approximately 325,000 people.

== Medalists ==
Medal	Name	Sport	Event	Date
Gold	Tonique Williams-Darling	Athletics	Women's 400 m	August 24
Bronze	Debbie Ferguson	Athletics	Women's 200 m	August 26

== Athletics ==
Bahamian athletes have so far achieved qualifying standards in the following athletics events (up to a maximum of 3 athletes in each event at the 'A' Standard, and 1 at the 'B' Standard).

Key

- Note–Ranks given for track events are within the athlete's heat only
- Q = Qualified for the next round
- q = Qualified for the next round as a fastest loser or, in field events, by position without achieving the qualifying target
- NR = National record
- N/A = Round not applicable for the event
- Bye = Athlete not required to compete in round

Men
Track & road events

Athlete	Event	Heat		Quarterfinal		Semifinal		Final	
Athlete	Event	Result	Rank	Result	Rank	Result	Rank	Result	Rank
Chris Brown	400 m	45.09	1 Q	—		45.31	3	Did not advance	
Dominic Demeritte	200 m	20.62	1 Q	20.61	6	Did not advance			
Chris Brown; Aaron Cleare; Dennis Darling*; Nathaniel McKinney; Andrae Williams	4 × 400 m relay	3:01.74	3 Q	—				3:01.88	6

* Competed only in heats

Field events

Athlete	Event	Qualification		Final	
Athlete	Event	Distance	Position	Distance	Position
Osbourne Moxey	Long jump	7.81	21	Did not advance	
Leevan Sands	Triple jump	16.35	27	Did not advance	

Women
Track & road events

Athlete	Event	Heat		Quarterfinal		Semifinal		Final	
Athlete	Event	Result	Rank	Result	Rank	Result	Rank	Result	Rank
Christine Amertil	400 m	50.23	2 Q	—		50.17	2 Q	50.37	7
Debbie Ferguson	100 m	11.30	3 Q	11.16	3 Q	11.04	4 Q	11.16	7
Debbie Ferguson	200 m	22.57	1 Q	22.53	2 Q	22.49	4 Q	22.30	3rd place, bronze medalist(s)
Chandra Sturrup	100 m	11.37	3 Q	11.46	7	Did not advance			
Tonique Williams-Darling	400 m	51.20	1 Q	—		50.00	1 Q	49.42	1st place, gold medalist(s)
Shandria Brown; Tamicka Clarke; Debbie Ferguson; Chandra Sturrup	4 × 100 m relay	43.02	2 Q	—				42.69	4

Field events

Athlete	Event	Qualification		Final	
Athlete	Event	Distance	Position	Distance	Position
Jackie Edwards	Long jump	6.53	=14	Did not advance	
Laverne Eve	Javelin throw	62.11	6 Q	62.77	6

== Swimming ==
Bahamian swimmers earned qualifying standards in the following events (up to a maximum of 2 swimmers in each event at the A-standard time, and 1 at the B-standard time):

Men

Athlete	Event	Heat		Semifinal		Final	
Athlete	Event	Time	Rank	Time	Rank	Time	Rank
Jeremy Knowles	200 m butterfly	1:59.32	20	Did not advance			
Jeremy Knowles	200 m individual medley	2:04.22	30	Did not advance			
Jeremy Knowles	400 m individual medley	4:23.29	21	—		Did not advance	
Nicholas Rees	100 m butterfly	56.39	50	Did not advance			
Chris Vythoulkas	100 m backstroke	58.31	38	Did not advance			

Women

Athlete	Event	Heat		Semifinal		Final	
Athlete	Event	Time	Rank	Time	Rank	Time	Rank
Nikia Deveaux	50 m freestyle	27.36	45	Did not advance			

== Tennis ==
Athlete	Event	Round of 32	Round of 16	Quarterfinals	Semifinals	Final / BM	
Athlete	Event	Opposition Score	Opposition Score	Opposition Score	Opposition Score	Opposition Score	Rank
Mark Knowles; Mark Merklein	Men's doubles	González / Massú (CHI); L 5–7, 4–6	Did not advance				

== See also ==
- Bahamas at the 2002 Commonwealth Games
- Bahamas at the 2003 Pan American Games
