= Bahamas at the 2024 Summer Olympics =

- Flag of the Bahamas
- IOC code: BAH
- NOC: Bahamas Olympic Committee
- Website: www.bahamasolympiccommittee.org

in Paris, France 26 July 2024 – 11 August 2024
- Competitors: 18 (10 men and 8 women) in 2 sports
- Flag bearers (opening): Steven Gardiner & Devynne Charlton
- Flag bearer (closing): Charisma Taylor
- Medals: Gold 0 Silver 0 Bronze 0 Total 0

Summer Olympics appearances (overview)
- 1952; 1956; 1960; 1964; 1968; 1972; 1976; 1980; 1984; 1988; 1992; 1996; 2000; 2004; 2008; 2012; 2016; 2020; 2024; 2028

The Bahamas, officially the Commonwealth of The Bahamas, competed at the 2024 Summer Olympics in Paris from 26 July to 11 August 2024. It was the nation's eighteenth appearance at the Summer Olympics, having appeared at every Summer Games since 1952 except for 1980, as part of the US led boycott.

For the first time since 1988, Bahamas failed to win an Olympic medal. The nation's best performance at Paris 2024 was Devynne Charlton in the women's 100m hurdles, who placed sixth.

== Competitors ==
The following is the list of number of competitors in the Games.

Sport	Men	Women	Total
Athletics	9	7	16
Swimming	1	1	2
Total	10	8	18

== Athletics ==
Bahamian track and field athletes achieved the entry standards for Paris 2024, either by passing the direct qualifying mark (or time for track and road races) or by world ranking, in the following events (a maximum of 3 athletes each):

Key

- Note–Ranks given for track events are within the athlete's heat only
- Q = Qualified for the next round
- q = Qualified for the next round as a fastest loser or, in field events, by position without achieving the qualifying target
- NR = National record
- N/A = Round not applicable for the event
- Bye = Athlete not required to compete in round

Track & road events

Athlete	Event	Preliminary		Heat		Repechage		Semifinal		Final	
Athlete	Event	Time	Rank	Time	Rank	Time	Rank	Time	Rank	Time	Rank
Terrence Jones	Men's 100 m	Bye		10.31	6	—N/a		Did not advance			
Wanya McCoy	Men's 100 m	Bye		10.24	5	—N/a		Did not advance			
Wanya McCoy	Men's 200 m	—N/a		20.35	2 Q	Bye		20.61	5	Did not advance	
Ian Kerr	Men's 200 m	—N/a		20.53	5 R	20.60	3	Did not advance			
Steven Gardiner	Men's 400 m	—N/a		DNS		Did not advance					
Antoine Andrews	Men's 110 m hurdles	—N/a		13.43	2 Q	Bye		13.43	8	Did not advance	
Devynne Charlton	Women's 100 m hurdles	—N/a		12.71	2 Q	Bye		12.50	2 Q	12.56	6
Denisha Cartwright	Women's 100 m hurdles	—N/a		12.89	4	13.45	7	Did not advance			
Charisma Taylor	Women's 100 m hurdles	—N/a		12.78	4 q	Bye		12.63 PB	3	Did not advance	
Shaunae Miller-Uibo	Women's 400 m	—N/a		2:29.29	7 R	53.50	7	Did not advance			
Wendell Miller; Zion Miller; Alonzo Russell; Lacarthea Cooper; Quincy Penn; Javonya Valcourt	Mixed 4 × 400 metres relay	—N/a		3:14.58	8	—N/a				Did not advance	

Field events

Athlete	Event	Qualification		Final	
Athlete	Event	Result	Rank	Result	Rank
Donald Thomas	Men's high jump	NM		Did not advance	
Charisma Taylor	Women's triple jump	14.01	15	Did not advance	
Rhema Otabor	Women's javelin throw	57.67	27	Did not advance	

Combined events – Men's decathlon

Athlete	Event	100 m	LJ	SP	HJ	400 m	110H	DT	PV	JT	1500 m	Final	Rank
Ken Mullings	Result	10.60	7.36	14.19	2.02	49.43 SB	13.70	46.07 PB	4.80	59.83 PB	4:55.84 SB	8226	13
Ken Mullings	Points	952	900	740	822	841	1014	789	849	735	584	8226	13

== Swimming ==
Bahamas sent two swimmers to compete at the 2024 Paris Olympics.

Athlete	Event	Heat		Semifinal		Final	
Athlete	Event	Time	Rank	Time	Rank	Time	Rank
Lamar Taylor	Men's 100 m freestyle	48.84	26	Did not advance			
Rhanishka Gibbs	Women's 50 m freestyle	26.27	31	Did not advance			

== See also ==
- Bahamas at the 2023 Pan American Games
