= Bahamas at the 2008 Summer Olympics =

- Flag of the Bahamas
- IOC code: BAH
- NOC: Bahamas Olympic Committee
- Website: www.bahamasolympiccommittee.org

in Beijing
- Competitors: 25 in 4 sports
- Flag bearer: Debbie Ferguson-McKenzie
- Medals Ranked 64th: Gold 0 Silver 1 Bronze 1 Total 2

Summer Olympics appearances (overview)
- 1952; 1956; 1960; 1964; 1968; 1972; 1976; 1980; 1984; 1988; 1992; 1996; 2000; 2004; 2008; 2012; 2016; 2020; 2024

The Bahamas sent a delegation of athletes to compete in the 2008 Summer Olympics, which were held in Beijing, People's Republic of China from 8 to 24 August 2008. Its Beijing appearance marked its fourteenth time at the Olympics since its début at the 1952 Summer Olympics in Helsinki. The delegation included 25 athletes across four sports (track and field, boxing, swimming and tennis) and nineteen distinct events. Its athletes advanced to semifinals in eight events and finals in five events, medaling in two of them (a silver in men's 4x400 meters relay by Andretti Bain, Michael Mathieu, Andrae Williams, Chris Brown, Avard Moncur and Ramon Miller, and a bronze in men's triple jump by Leevan Sands). The Bahamian delegation was one of the largest sent between its début and 2008. The country's flag bearer was Debbie Ferguson-McKenzie.

== Background ==
Before Beijing, the Bahamas had participated in the Summer Olympics thirteen times. This included every single Summer Olympics starting from the 1952 Summer Olympics in Helsinki, Finland, but excluding the 1980 Summer Olympics in Moscow, the Soviet Union. The Bahamas had, as of 2008, never had an appearance in any Winter Olympics. The Bahamian delegation in Beijing included twenty-five athletes, one of its largest delegations in its history up to that point. Prior to Beijing, Bahamian athletes had won four gold medals, one silver and four bronze; a total of nine medals. Bahama's delegation in Beijing added one silver and one bronze medal to the tally, increasing the total number of Bahamian medals to eleven. The flag bearer at ceremonies was Debbie Ferguson-McKenzie. The Bahamian delegation was 41st in line during the flagbearing ceremonies.

Bahamian Olympic coach Keith Parker, prior to the start of the Olympic track events, said that Derrick Atkins held a strong chance of medaling in his events, having considered Atkin's unexpected medaling at the 2007 World Championships, tying Jamaica's Asafa Powell and the United States' Tyson Gay for second place. Similar expectations were held for Chris Brown. Henry Rolle, the track coach at Auburn University, traveled to Beijing to train former athletes at Tianjin University. Several Bahamians were included in this group.

== Medalists ==
Medal	Name	Sport	Event
Silver	Andretti Bain; Michael Mathieu; Andrae Williams; Chris Brown; Avard Moncur; Ramon Miller	Athletics	Men's 4 × 400 metre relay
Bronze	Leevan Sands	Athletics	Men's triple jump

== Athletics ==
=== Men's competition ===
Eleven male athletes competed in track and field events on behalf of the Bahamas. Of those athletes, three participated in the 4 × 400 meters relay only (Williams, Moncur, Miller); five participated only in events other than the 4 × 400 meters relay (Atkins, Rolle, L. Sands, S. Sands, and Thomas), and three participated in both an individual event and the 4 × 400 meters relay. Of the individual events, Bahamian athletes were involved in six distinct events (100 meters, 40 meters, 200 meters, triple jump, 110 meters hurdles, and high jump). The two Bahamian medals won at Beijing were won by men in track and field events (4 × 400 meters relay and triple jump).

==== Men's high jump ====
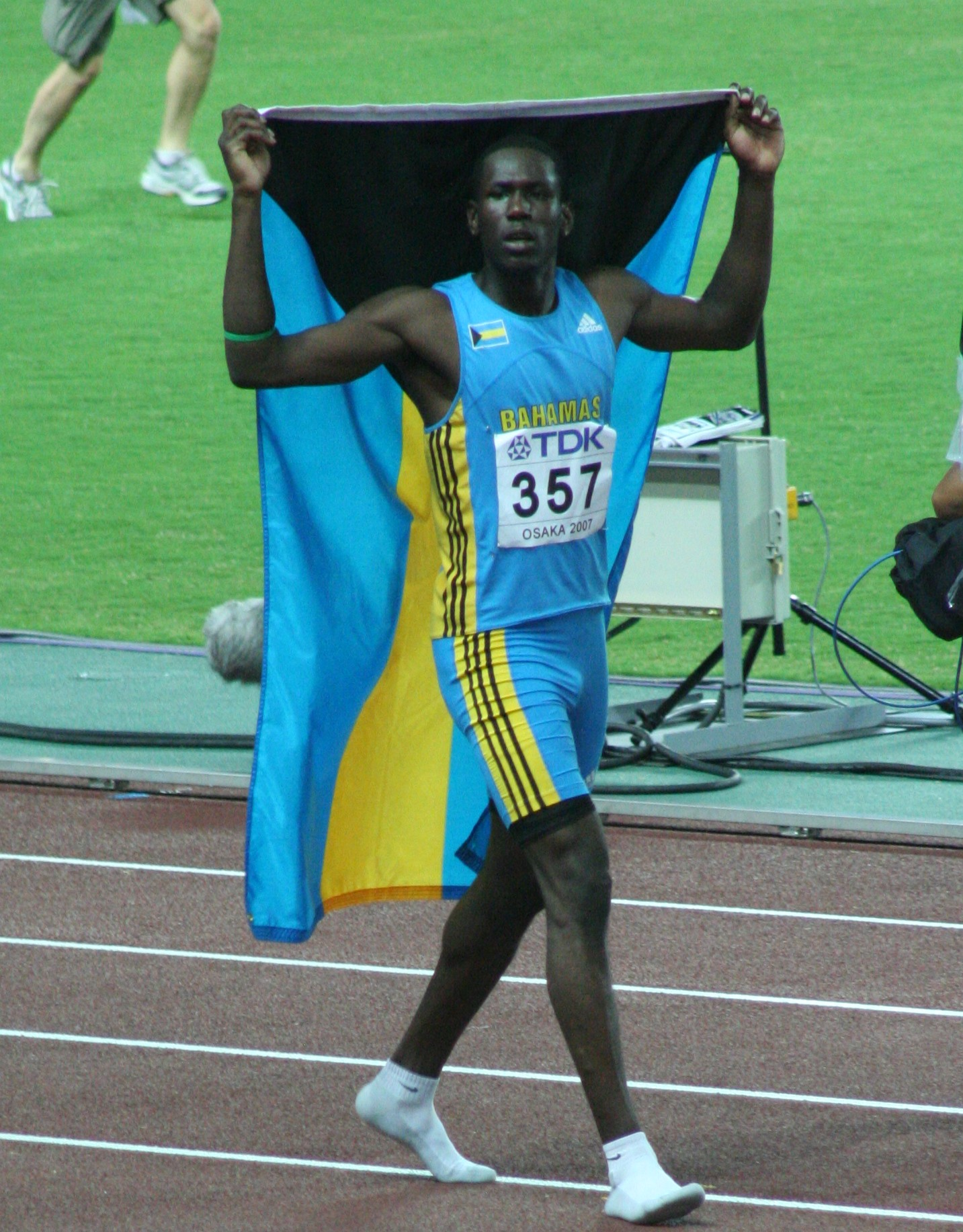
Donald Thomas, who competed in high jump for the Bahamas at Beijing

Donald Thomas was the sole Bahamian athlete participating in the men's high jump event of the Beijing Olympics. During the event's qualification round on 17 August, Thomas was placed in the first heat versus competitors that included the Czech Republic's Jaroslav Baba and Great Britain's Germaine Mason. Thomas' best height cleared during this preliminary round was 2.20 meters, the same height as Israeli Nikita Palli; Pole Michal Bieniek; Syrian Majed Aldin Gazal; and American Dusty Jonas. However, Thomas tied Palli for twelfth place and scored ahead of Bieniek, Gazal and Jonas because Palli and Thomas had no misses at the high jump bar; the other three athletes did. Overall, Thomas tied Ukrainian Dmytro Dem'yanyuk and also Palli for twenty-first place out of the forty competing athletes. Thomas did not advance to the final round.

==== Men's 200 meters ====
Jamaal Rolle (or Jamial Rolle) competed on behalf of the Bahamas in the men's 200 meters. Rolle was placed in the seventh heat of eight heats during the 17 August qualification round. Facing competitors that included the Dutch Antillean Churandy Martina, Azerbaijani Ramil Guliyev, and Nigerian Obinna Metu, Rolle ranked fifth out of eight athletes in his heat after completing his event in 20.93 seconds. Rolle scored ahead of sixth-place finalist Shingo Suetsugu of Japan, and behind fourth-place finalist Sandro Viana of Brazil, falling 0.09 seconds behind the latter. Overall, Rolle ranked thirty-fourth out of the sixty-six athletes who participated in the first round. He did not progress to further rounds.

==== Men's 110 meters hurdles ====
Auburn University graduate Shamar Sands reached the quarterfinals in the 110 meter hurdles. During the qualification round on 17 August, Sands was placed in the second heat, facing competitors that included America's David Oliver and Spain's Jackson Quiñónez. Sands ranked third out of seven athletes, completing his event in 13.45 seconds. He placed 0.04 seconds behind second-place heat finalist Quiñónez, and 0.15 seconds behind heat leader Oliver. Overall, Sands ranked eighth out of the forty-three athletes who participated in the qualification round. Sands progressed to quarterfinals, where he was again placed in the second heat. Completing the event with a time of 13.55 seconds, Sands ranked seventh in the heat of eight athletes behind South Korea's Lee Jeong-Jun and ahead of Georgia's David Ilariani. Sands fell behind heat leader Dayron Robles of Cuba by 0.36 seconds and did not progress further.

==== Men's 100 meters ====
Jamaican-born runner Derrick Atkins was the only Bahamian to participate in the men's 100 meters race at the Beijing Olympics. Atkins was placed in the eighth heat during the 14 August qualification round, facing athletes that included Russia's Andrey Epishin and Norway's Jaysuma Saidy Ndure. Atkins ranked first in his heat of eight athletes with a time of 10.28 seconds, defeating second-place heat finalist Epishin by 0.06 seconds. Of the 80 athletes who participated in the qualification round of the event, Atkins tied Cuban Jenris Vizcaino for eighteenth place. He advanced to quarterfinals on 15 August. At quarterfinals, Atkins participated in the fifth heat against athletes that included Walter Dix of the United States and Asafa Powell of Jamaica. Atkins finished in third place in his heat with a time of 10.14 seconds, falling behind Walter Dix, who ranked second with a time of 10.08 seconds; and placing ahead of Antigua and Barbuda's Daniel Bailey, who ranked fourth with a time of 10.23 seconds. Of the four quarterfinalists, Atkins tied Ndure for fourteenth place, and advanced to the 16 August semifinals. Atkins competed in the first heat against, among other athletes, Dix and Usain Bolt. With a time of 10.13 seconds, Atkins finished in sixth place in his heat, behind Saint Kitts and Nevis' Kim Collins (who earned a time of 10.05 seconds) and ahead of Great Britain's Tyrone Edgar (who earned a time of 10.18 seconds). Overall, Atkins ranked twelfth out of sixteen athletes in semifinals, and did not advance to the final round.

==== Men's triple jump ====
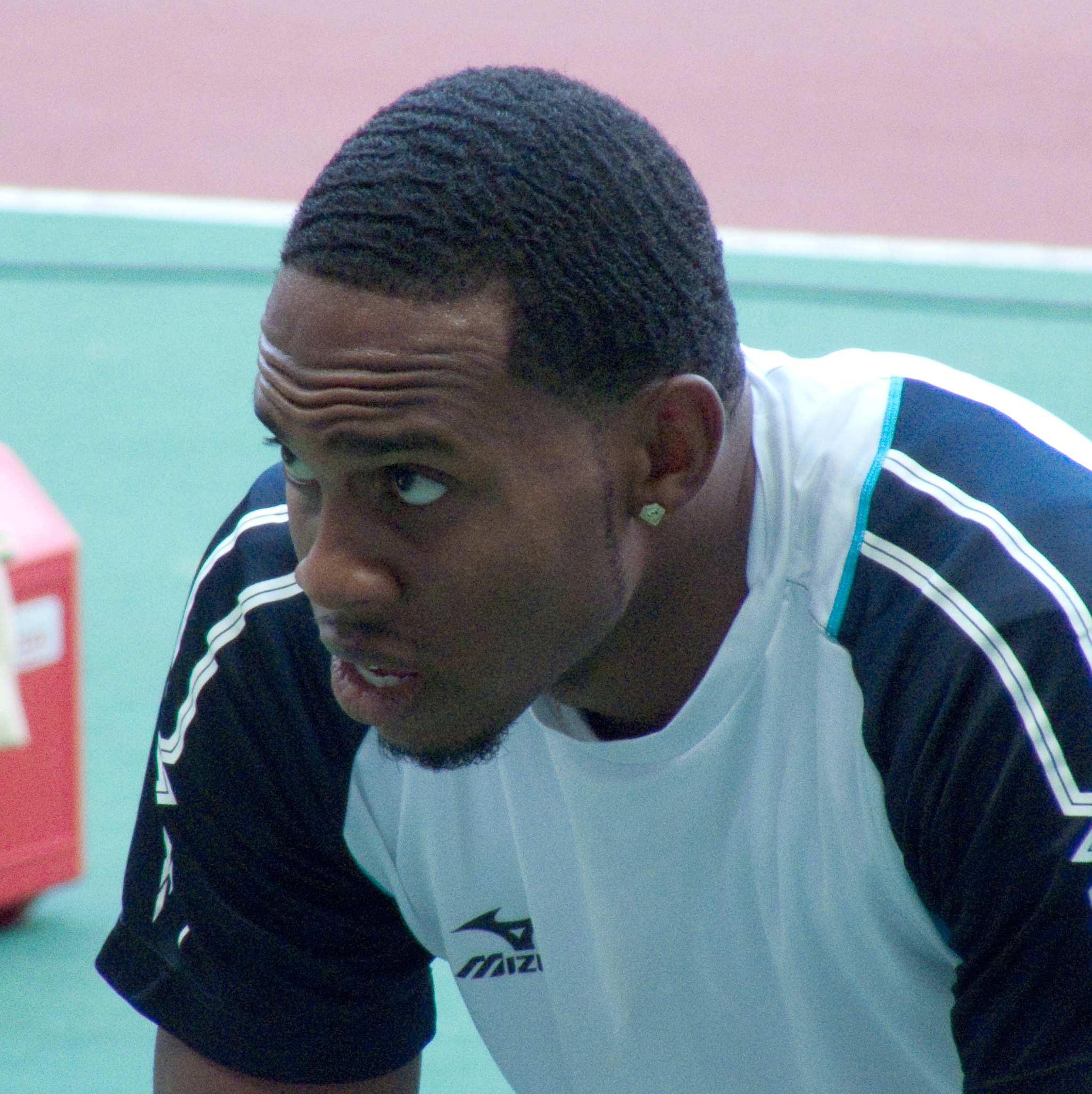
Leevan Sands, who medaled in triple jump at Beijing in 2008

Auburn University graduate and two-time Olympian Leevan Sands, the cousin of Shamar Sands, was the sole Bahamian participant in the men's triple jump event. During the qualification round on 17 August, Sands was placed in the second heat against competitors that included Li Yanxi of China, Onochie Achike of Great Britain, and Hector Fuentes of Cuba. Sands ranked second in his heat of twenty athletes, jumping a distance of 17.25 meters. Li, the heat leader, beat Sands by 0.05 meters, while Achike del behind Sands by 0.07 meters. Overall, Sands ranked fifth out of the thirty-nine participating athletes. He progressed to the final round on 21 August. During that round, Sands jumped a distance of 17.59 meters, medaling bronze behind silver medalist Phillips Idowu of Great Britain (who jumped 17.62 meters) and gold medalist Nelson Évora of Portugal (who jumped 17.67 meters).

==== Men's 400 meters ====
Oral Roberts University athlete Andretti "Dretti" Bain, two-time medalist and three-time Olympian Chris Brown, and Adidas-sponsored athlete Michael Mathieu participated in the men's 400 meters dash. Brown was placed in the second heat, and finished first with a time of 44.79 seconds, ahead of second-place finalist Australian Joel Milburn. Bain was placed in the third heat, and placed third out of eight athletes after gaining a time of 45.96 seconds, placing behind Nigeria's Godday James (who finished with 45.49 seconds) and ahead of Fiji's Niko Verekauta (who finished with 46.32 seconds). Mathieu participated in the sixth heat and ranked third out of eight athletes, earning a time of 45.17 seconds. He placed ahead of Jamaica's Michael Blackwood (who earned 45.56 seconds) and behind Trinidad and Tobago's Renny Quow (who earned 45.13 seconds). Out of all fifty-six athletes participating in the event, Chris Brown ranked first; Michael Mathieu tied Australia's Sean Wroe for tenth; and Bain ranked thirty-first. All three advanced to semifinals, which took place on 19 August. During the course of semifinals, Brown was placed in the first heat; Bain was placed in the second; and Mathieu was placed in the third. Chris Brown finished the event in 44.59 seconds, ranking second in the heat behind American Jeremy Wariner and ahead of Belgian Kevin Borlée. Bain completed the event in 45.42 seconds, placing seventh in his heat, ahead of Briton Andrew Steele and Nigerian Godday James. Mathieu completed the race in 45.56 seconds, placing sixth in his heat out of eight competitors. Mathieu ranked ahead of seventh-place finisher Wroe and behind Congolese competitor Senga Gary Kikaya. Out of the 24 competitors who advanced to semifinals, Brown finished third; Bain finished nineteenth; and Mathieu finished twentieth. Only Brown advanced to the final round on 21 August. Brown finished the event in 44.84 seconds, placing fourth behind the three American medalists (LaShawn Merritt, Jeremy Wariner and David Neville).

==== Men's 4 × 400 meters relay ====
The men's 4×400 meters relay included a Bahamian team that, in total, included six Bahamian athletes. Of those athletes, Avard Moncur and Ramon Miller participated only in the qualification round alongside Michael Mathieu and Andrae Williams. In the qualification round, which took place on 22 August, the Bahamian team participated on the second heat against the British, Jamaican, Trinidadian, Japanese, Greek and Dominican teams. Overall, the Bahamian team ranked second in the heat with a time of 2:59.88 behind the British team (which earned a time of 2:59.33) and ahead of the Jamaican team (which earned a time of 3:00.09). Out of all sixteen teams participating in the event, the Bahamian team ranked second. The Bahamas' relay proceeded to the final round on 23 August. During the final round, the Bahamian relay replaced Avard Moncur and Ramon Miller with Chris Brown and Andretti Bain. Chris Brown started the relay, followed by Mathieu; Bain; and Williams. With a time of 2:58.03, the relay medaled silver behind the American relay (which earned 2:55.39 and set an Olympic record) and ahead of the Russian relay (which earned 2:58.06).

==== Summary ====
Key

- Note–Ranks given for track events are within the athlete's heat only
- Q = Qualified for the next round
- q = Qualified for the next round as a fastest loser or, in field events, by position without achieving the qualifying target
- NR = National record
- N/A = Round not applicable for the event
- Bye = Athlete not required to compete in round

Men
Track & road events

Athlete	Event	Heat		Quarterfinal		Semifinal		Final	
Athlete	Event	Result	Rank	Result	Rank	Result	Rank	Result	Rank
Derrick Atkins	100 m	10.28	1 Q	10.14	3 Q	10.13	6	Did not advance	
Andretti Bain	400 m	45.96	3 Q	—		45.52	7	Did not advance	
Chris Brown	400 m	44.79	1 Q	—		45.59	2 Q	44.84	4
Michael Mathieu	400 m	45.17	3 Q	—		45.56	6	Did not advance	
Jamial Rolle	200 m	20.93	5	Did not advance					
Shamar Sands	110 m hurdles	13.45	3 Q	13.55	6	Did not advance			
Andretti Bain; Michael Mathieu; Andrae Williams; Chris Brown; Avard Moncur*; Ramon Miller*	4 × 400 m relay	2.59.88	2 Q	—				2:58.03	2nd place, silver medalist(s)

* Runners who participated in the heats only and received medals.

Field events

Athlete	Event	Qualification		Final	
Athlete	Event	Distance	Position	Distance	Position
Leevan Sands	Triple jump	17.25	5 Q	17.59 NR	3rd place, bronze medalist(s)
Donald Thomas	High jump	2.20	21	Did not advance	

=== Women's competition ===
==== Women's 400 meters ====
Southeastern Louisiana University alumnus and three-time Olympian Christine Amertil was the only Bahamian athlete participating in the women's 400 meters dash during the 2008 Summer Olympics. During the qualification round, which took place on 16 August, Amertil was placed in the first heat, which included seven athletes. Among them were Jamaica's Rosemarie Whyte and Nigeria's Ajoke Odumosu. Amertil ranked second in her heat, with a time of 51.25 seconds, between Whyte (first place at 51.00 seconds) and Odumosu (third place at 51.39 seconds). Overall, Amertil ranked tenth out of fifty athletes. She advanced to the semifinal round. During the 17 August semifinal round, Amertil was placed in the second heat, which included American Sanya Richards and Russian Anastasia Kapachinskaya. Amertil ranked fourth in the heat of eight athletes, completing her event in 51.51 seconds. Jamaica's Novelene Williams ranked ahead of her (third place at 51.06 seconds), and Nigeria's Joy Amechi Eze ranked behind her (at 51.87 seconds). Out of the 24 athletes that progressed to semifinals, Amertil ranked 15th. She did not progress to the final round.

==== Women's javelin throw ====
Five-time Olympian and former Louisiana State University athlete Laverne Eve, the oldest Bahamian athlete in the Beijing delegation, was the sole Bahamian participant in women's javelin throw. The event's qualification round, which took place on 18 August, included Eve in its second heat. During qualifications, Eve participated in three rounds. She threw the javelin 55.22 meters during the first round (placing thirteenth), and improved to 57.36 meters in her second round (placing fourth). She threw 55.15 meters the third round, but did not place. Out of the twenty-seven participants in the heat, Eve's best time placed her ninth in the event between Cuba's Yanet Cruz (58.06 meters on her best attempt) and the Czech Republic's Jarmila Klimesova (57.25 meters on her best attempt). Out of all 54 competitors in the qualification round, Eve ranked twentieth. She did not progress to the final round.

==== Women's 100 meters ====
Two-time Olympian Tamicka Clarke (or Tamica Clarke) two-time medalist and three-time Olympian Chandra Sturrup, and three-time medalist and four-time Olympian Debbie Ferguson-McKenzie participated in the women's 100 meters race. Clarke was placed in the sixth heat, where she competed against athletes like Jamaica's Shelly-Ann Frazer. Clarke ranked sixth of eight athletes in the heat when she ran the event in 12.16 seconds. Clarke ranked 56th out of 85 athletes, and did not progress. Sturrup, who competed in the fourth heat, defeated Trinidad and Tobago's Kelly Ann Baptiste and took first with a time of 11.30 seconds. Overall, Sturrup tied Great Britain's Jeanette Kwakye for seventh place. Ferguson participated in the eighth heat and completed the event in 11.17 seconds, ranking second behind Nigeria's Damola Osayomi (who earned first in 11.13 seconds). Ferguson placed second overall out of all combined heats. Both Sturrup and Ferguson progressed to quarterfinals, which took place later that day.

Sturrup was placed in the second heat and completed the event in 11.16 seconds. Out of the eight heat competitors, Sturrup ranked third behind Jamaica's Sherone Simpson (11.02 seconds) and the United States' Muna Lee (11.18 seconds). Out of the forty quarterfinalists, Sturrup ranked ninth. Ferguson competed in the third heat and finished in 11.21 seconds and ranked first, defeating Osayomi (11.28 seconds) and Ghana's Vida Anim (11.32 seconds). Overall, Ferguson placed eleventh. Both progressed to semifinals on 17 August.

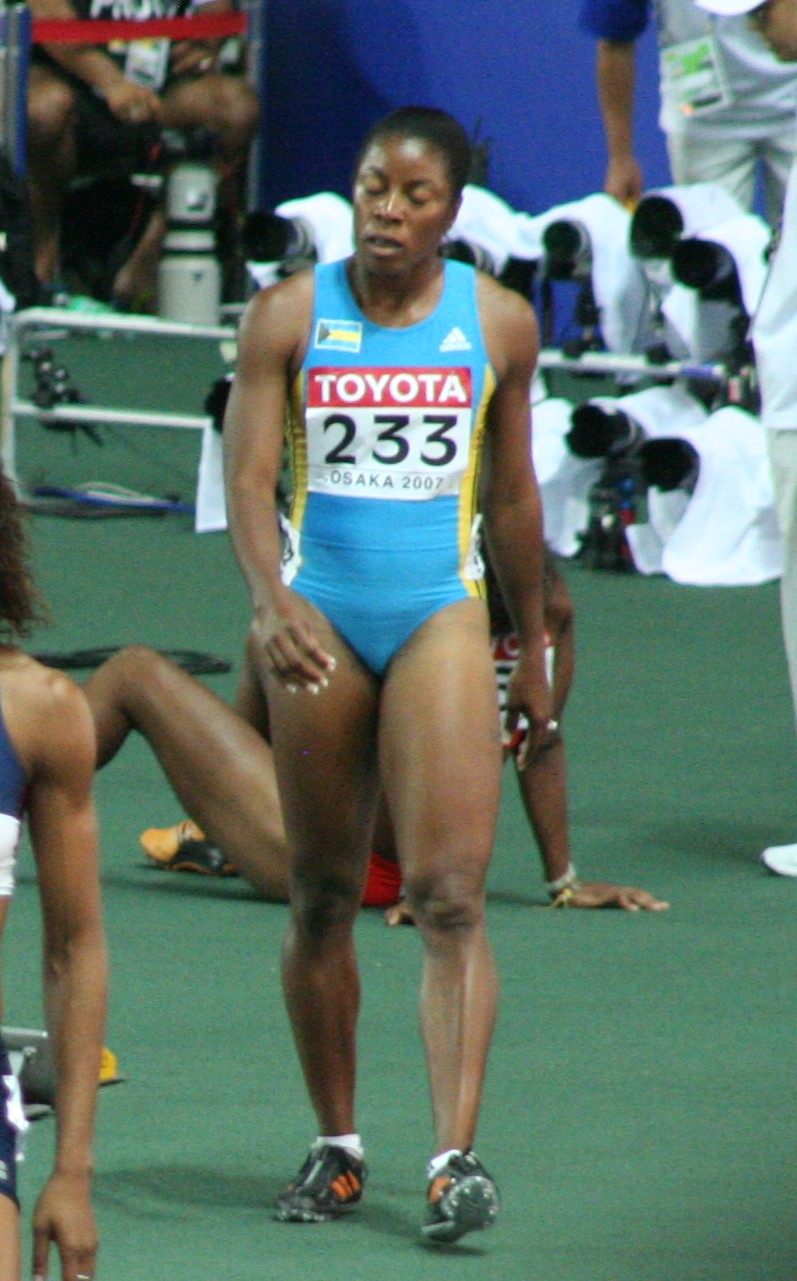
Debbie Ferguson, who ranked seventh in the final rounds of both the 100 meters and 200 meters

Chandra Sturrup competed in the first heat of the semifinal round and finished the event in 11.22 seconds. She placed fifth behind Simpson (11.11 seconds), Lauryn Williams (11.10 seconds), Muna Lee (11.06 seconds), and Frazer (11.00 seconds). Debbie Ferguson competed in the second heat of the semifinal round. She also finished the event in 11.22 seconds and took fourth place immediately behind Kwakye (11.19 seconds) and also behind the United States' Torri Edwards (11.18 seconds) and heat leader Kerron Stewart of Jamaica (11.05 seconds). The two athletes tied each other for eighth place out of sixteen athletes, although Ferguson progressed to finals. At finals, which took place later on 17 August, Ferguson finished in 11.19 seconds and placed seventh in the event ahead of the United States' Torri Edwards (11.20 seconds) and behind Kwakye (11.14 seconds).

==== Women's 200 meters ====
The women's 200 meters freestyle had two competitors: Sheniqua Ferguson and Debbie Ferguson. Sheniqua Ferguson competed in the fifth heat of the 18 August qualification round, where she competed against athletes like Jamaica's Veronica Campbell (23.04 seconds), Mali's Kadiatou Camara (23.06 seconds), and Russia's Natalia Rusakova (23.21 seconds). Sheniqua Ferguson ranked fourth in her heat, behind the aforementioned athletes. Overall, she tied Colombia's Darlenys Obregón for 24th place out of the qualification round's 48 competitors. Debbie Ferguson, who was in the third heat, completed her race in 23.22 seconds and placed second in her heat behind the United States' Marshevet Hooker (23.07 seconds) and ahead of Nigeria's Damola Osayomi. Out of all qualification round competitors, Debbie Ferguson placed twentieth. Both Sheniqua and Debbie Ferguson progressed to the quarterfinal round, which took place on 19 August.

Sheniqua Ferguson competed in the third heat. She finished last with a time of 23.61 seconds, falling behind seventh-place finalist Vincenza Cali of Italy (23.56 seconds). The leader of her heat was Russian Yulia Chermoshanskaya (at 22.63 seconds). Sheniqua Ferguson ranked 29th out of the 32 athletes who progressed to quarterfinals. Debbie Ferguson was placed in the first heat, and finished her event in 22.77 seconds behind American Allyson Felix (22.74 seconds) and Jamaican Veronica Campbell (22.64 seconds). She ranked ninth overall. Although Sheniqua Ferguson did not, Debbie Ferguson progressed to semifinals.

Debbie Ferguson competed in the first heat during the 20 August semifinal round. She finished the dash in 22.51 seconds, ranking fourth behind American Muna Lee (22.29 seconds, 3rd place), Jamaican Kerron Stewart (22.29 seconds, 2nd place) and Jamaican Veronica Campbell (22.19 seconds, 1st place). Out of the sixteen semifinalists, Ferguson ranked seventh, and progressed to finals. At the final round, which took place on 21 August, Ferguson ran her event in 22.61 seconds. She ranked seventh in her event overall ahead of the Cayman Islands' Cydonie Mothersille and behind Jamaica's Sherone Simpson.

==== Women's long jump ====
Former Stanford University athlete and five-time Olympian (the first four times for the United States) Jackie Edwards participated in the Olympics on behalf of the Bahamas in women's long jump. On 18 August, Edwards was placed in the second qualifying heat with 20 other people, including American Brittney Reese and Russian and eventual silver medalist Tatyana Lebedeva, who were the heat's leaders. However, Edwards did not receive a mark and, thus, did not score or rank in her heat. She was one of three athletes to receive no mark during the qualification round (the others were Slovakia's Jana Velďáková and India's Anju Bobby George).

==== Summary ====
Key

- Note–Ranks given for track events are within the athlete's heat only
- Q = Qualified for the next round
- q = Qualified for the next round as a fastest loser or, in field events, by position without achieving the qualifying target
- NR = National record
- N/A = Round not applicable for the event
- Bye = Athlete not required to compete in round

Women
Track & road events

Athlete	Event	Heat		Quarterfinal		Semifinal		Final	
Athlete	Event	Result	Rank	Result	Rank	Result	Rank	Result	Rank
Christine Amertil	400 m	51.25	2 Q	—		51.51	4	Did not advance	
Tamicka Clarke	100 m	12.16	6	Did not advance					
Debbie Ferguson-McKenzie	100 m	11.17	2 Q	11.21	1 Q	11.22	4 Q	11.19	7
Debbie Ferguson-McKenzie	200 m	23.22	2 Q	22.77	3 Q	22.51	4 Q	22.61	7
Sheniqua Ferguson	200 m	23.33	4 Q	23.61	8	Did not advance			
Chandra Sturrup	100 m	11.30	1 Q	11.16	3 Q	11.22	5	Did not advance	

Field events

Athlete	Event	Qualification		Final	
Athlete	Event	Distance	Position	Distance	Position
Jackie Edwards	Long jump	NM	—	Did not advance	
Laverne Eve	Javelin throw	57.36	20	Did not advance	

== Boxing ==
The Bahamas qualified one boxer for the Olympic boxing tournament. Johnson qualified for the welterweight class at the 2nd American qualifying event.

Toureano Johnson was the only boxer to participate on behalf of the Bahamas during the Beijing Olympics. He participated in the welterweight class, which includes competitors of a weight below 69 kilograms. Boxing preliminaries in Beijing took place on 10 August. Johnson was matched with Rolande Moses of Grenada in the second bout of the round. Johnson scored 18 punches on Moses, while Moses only scored three in return. Johnson advanced to the Round of 16, which was staggered across several days. Toureano Johnson challenged the Ukraine's Olexandr Strets'kyy during the third bout on 16 August, scoring nine punches on him and receiving four in return and defeating him. He advanced to quarterfinals on 17 August, where he challenged and was defeated by China's Hanati Silamu during the second bout. Johnson scored four punches on his opponent, who scored 14 in return.

Athlete	Event	Round of 32	Round of 16	Quarterfinals	Semifinals	Final	
Athlete	Event	Opposition Result	Opposition Result	Opposition Result	Opposition Result	Opposition Result	Rank
Tureano Johnson	Welterweight	Moses (GRN); W 18–3	Stretskyy (UKR); W 9–4	Hanati (CHN); L 4–14	Did not advance		

== Swimming ==
=== Men's competition ===
==== Men's 50 meters freestyle ====
University of Kentucky student Elvis Burrows was the only Bahamian swimmer to participate in the 50 meters freestyle event during the Beijing Olympics. Burrows participated in the eighth heat of the event during the 14 August preliminary rounds. Other swimmers in his heat included Flori Lang of Switzerland and Jacinto de Jesus Ayala Benjamin of the Dominican Republic, who respectively took first and second in the heat. Burrows ranked seventh, completing his event in 23.19 seconds. Burrows ranked ahead of eighth-place heat finisher Rolandas Gimbutis of Lithuania by 0.83 seconds and behind sixth-place heat finisher Francisco Picasso of Uruguay by 0.18 seconds. Overall, Burrows ranked 52nd out of 97 event participants. He did not progress to the semifinal rounds.

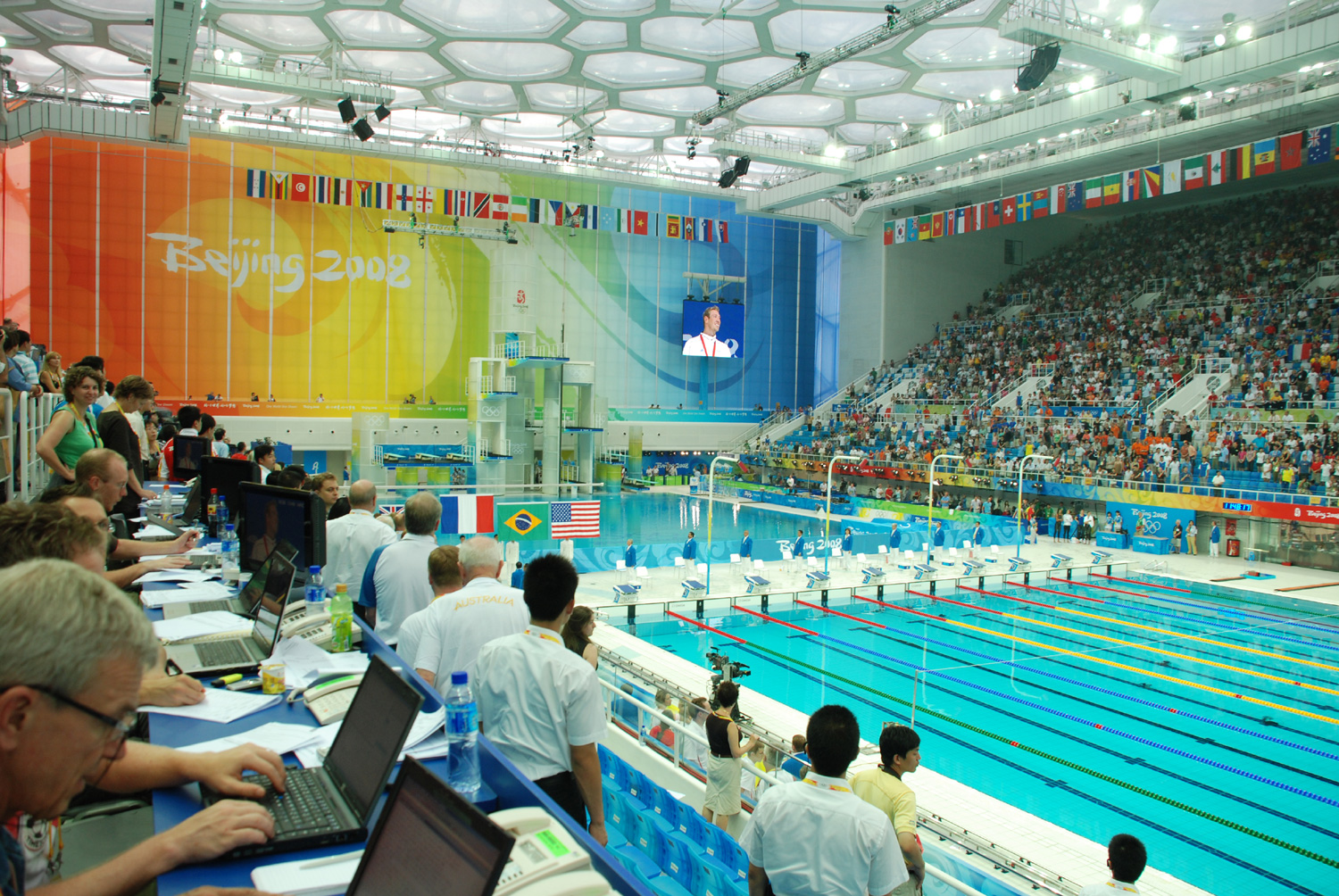
The "Water Cube", where all Beijing Olympic swimming events took place

==== Men's 100 meters butterfly ====
Former Auburn University athlete and three-time Olympian Jeremy Knowles competed in three events at the Beijing Olympics: The 100 meters butterfly, the 200 meters butterfly, and the 200 meters individual medley. In the 100 meters butterfly, Knowles participated in the third heat of the 14 August preliminary round, competing against athletes that included Israel's Alon Mandel and Lithuania's Rimvydas Salcius. Knowles ranked third in his heat after completing the event in 53.72 seconds, falling behind Mandel by 0.27 seconds but beating Hungarian Adam Madrassy by 0.21 seconds. Overall, Knowles ranked 49th out of 66th participating athletes, and did not advance.

==== Men's 200 meters butterfly ====
Jeremy Knowles' participation in the 200 meters butterfly took place during the 11 August preliminary round. He was placed in the third heat, which was led by Hsu Chi-Chieh of Taiwan and Pedro Oliveira of Portugal. Knowles completed the event in 2:01.08, placing sixth in the event. He fell behind Omar Pinzón of Columbia (who finished in 2:01.08) and ahead of Malaysia's Daniel Bego (who finished in 2:01.28). Out of the 44 competitors in the preliminary round, Knowles ranked 35th. He did not advance to further rounds.

==== Men's 200 meters individual medley ====
Knowles competed on behalf of the Bahamas in the 200 meters individual medley, an event that combines all the competitive swimming strokes. The event's preliminary round took place on 13 August. Knowles competed in the third heat, which was led by Israel's Gal Nevo; Bulgaria's Mihail Alexandrov' and Greece's Ioannis Kokkodis. Knowles ranked fourth in the heat with a time of 2:01.35, falling behind Kokkodis (who completed the event in 2:01.22) but placing ahead of Croatia's Sasa Impric (who completed the event in 2:01.83). Out of the 47 competing athletes, Knowles placed 24th. He did not advance.

=== Women's competition ===
==== Women's 100 meters backstroke ====
Canada-born Auburn University alumnus Alana Dillette was the only swimmer to participate in the women's 100 meters backstroke while representing the Bahamas at the Beijing Olympics. Dillette participated in the preliminary rounds of her event on 10 August, when she swam in the third heat versus swimmers that included Columbia's Carolina Colorado and Israel's Anna Gostomelsky, who ranked, respectively, first and second in that heat. Dillette ranked fourth in the heat with a time of 1:02.56 behind Sweden's Sarah Sjöström by 0.24 seconds, and ahead of Hong Kong's Hiu Wai Sherry Tsai by 0.12 seconds. Out of the total of 49 swimmers that took part in the preliminary rounds, Dillette ranked 32nd. She did not advance to semifinals later that day.

==== Women's 50 meters freestyle ====
Auburn University student Arianna Vanderpool-Wallace participated in two events at Beijing: the 50 meters freestyle, and the 100 meters freestyle. In the 50 meters freestyle, preliminary rounds took place on 15 August. Vanderpool-Wallace was placed in the eighth heat, which was led by Israel's Anna Gostomelsky, Vanderpool-Wallace, and the Czech Republic's Sandra Kazikova. She ranked second with a time of 25.40 seconds, whereas heat leader Gostomelsky finished at 25.23 seconds, and third-place finalist Kazikova finished at 25.54 seconds. Overall, out of the 92 participating athletes, Vanderpool-Wallace ranked 24th. She did not advance to later rounds.

==== Women's 100 meters freestyle ====
Vanderpool-Wallace's performance in the 100 meters freestyle took place during the preliminary round on 13 August. She was placed in the third heat, which included athletes like Hong Kong's Hannah Jane Arnett Wilson and Austria's Birgit Koschischek. With a time of 55.61 seconds, Vanderpool-Wallace placed second, behind heat leader Wilson (who finished at 55.32 seconds) and ahead of third-place finalist Koschischek (who finished at 55.62 seconds). Of the 49 participants, Vanderpool-Wallace ranked 28th. She did not advance past preliminaries.

=== Summary ===
Men

Athlete	Event	Heat		Semifinal		Final	
Athlete	Event	Time	Rank	Time	Rank	Time	Rank
Elvis Burrows	50 m freestyle	23.19	52	Did not advance			
Jeremy Knowles	100 m butterfly	53.72 NR	49	Did not advance			
Jeremy Knowles	200 m butterfly	2:01.08	35	Did not advance			
Jeremy Knowles	200 m individual medley	2:01.35 NR	24	Did not advance			

Qualifiers for the latter rounds of all events were decided on a time only basis, therefore positions shown are overall results versus competitors in all heats.

Women

Athlete	Event	Heat		Semifinal		Final	
Athlete	Event	Time	Rank	Time	Rank	Time	Rank
Alana Dillette	100 m backstroke	1:02.56	32	Did not advance			
Arianna Vanderpool-Wallace	50 m freestyle	25.40	24	Did not advance			
Arianna Vanderpool-Wallace	100 m freestyle	55.61	28	Did not advance			

Qualifiers for the latter rounds of all events were decided on a time only basis, therefore positions shown are overall results versus competitors in all heats.

== Tennis ==
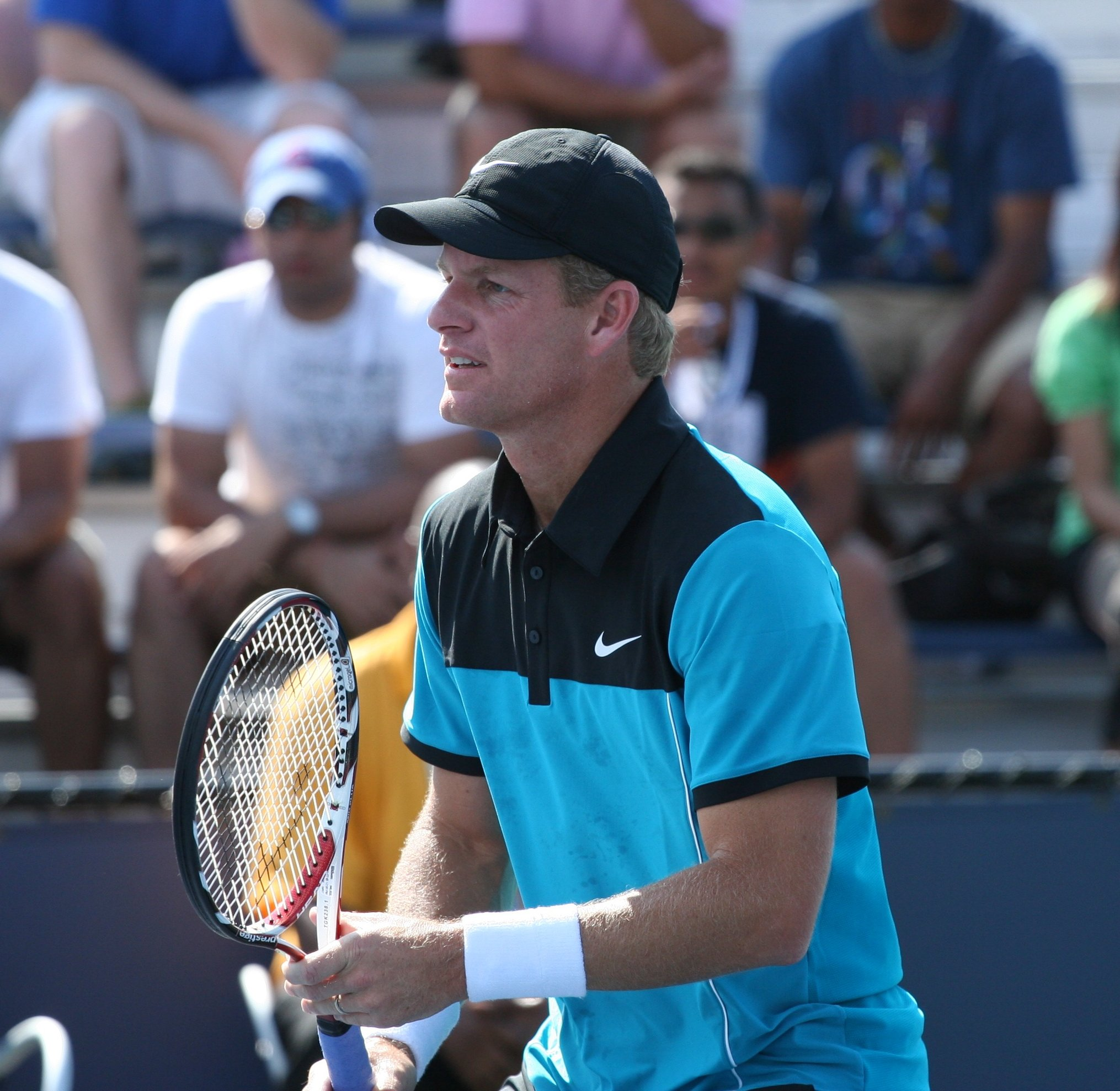
Mark Knowles, who competed for the Bahamas at Beijing in tennis

Mark Knowles (a five-time Olympian) and Devin Mullings participated in men's doubles tennis on behalf of the Bahamas. Their entrance constituted the only Bahamian participation in any tennis event, and the only tennis entry by any nation in the Caribbean. The pair participated in the first match of the event's first round on 11 August, where they faced a team from the United States that included Bob and Mike Bryan. The Bryan brothers won two sets against the Bahamian team and defeated them, eventually winning the bronze medal in the event.

Athlete	Event	Round of 32	Round of 16	Quarterfinals	Semifinals	Final / BM	
Athlete	Event	Opposition Score	Opposition Score	Opposition Score	Opposition Score	Opposition Score	Rank
Mark Knowles; Devin Mullings	Men's doubles	B Bryan / M Bryan (USA); L 6–2, 6–1	Did not advance				

== See also ==
- Bahamas at the 2007 Pan American Games
- Bahamas at the 2010 Central American and Caribbean Games
