= Forty Plus Cycling Club =

The Forty Plus Cycling Club is a cycling club for adult cyclists in England, particularly active in the South East. It was founded in 1951 as a nonprofit organization and had 816 members in 2014.

The club is affiliated to the CTC and British Cycling.

Whilst other cycle clubs organise their rides mostly at weekends, the Forty Plus Cycling Club meets the needs of cyclists who are retired, unemployed or working shifts by offering its rides on Tuesdays, Wednesdays, Thursdays and Fridays.

Sections of the club in Bedfordshire, Essex, Hertfordshire, Kent, Northamptonshire, Surrey and Sussex each organise rides between one and three times a week.

== Activities ==
The Forty Plus Cycling Club promotes sociable cycling activities for older men and women. Activities cater for a wide range of cycling abilities with members aged from 18 to over 100.

The club undertakes some adventurous tours, including a 7 day circuit of London.

=== Section rides ===
16 sections organise over 20 led rides and meets every week throughout the year and on most days of the week.

=== Open Events ===
Special events for the whole club are held between May and September. These are also open to non-members:

- Founders’ Day 62 km
- Circuit of Bedford 100 km
- Herts Hilly 100 km
- Mid Essex 100 km
- Sights of London ride 25 miles
- Sussex Weald 100 km
- The Ugley Ride 100 km
- Audax taster 100 km

== Signpost Magazine ==
Signpost is the quarterly club magazine sent free to members. It includes articles, drawings and photographs submitted by members as well as news and details of events. Non-members may download back issues of Signpost from the club website.

== Library ==
The club maintains an extensive library of cycling publications, including books on cycle touring, racing, reference books, biographies, guidebooks and maps.

== History ==
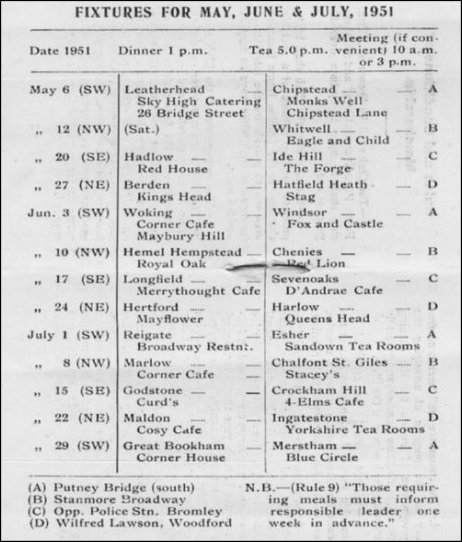
The first runs list in 1951

The Forty Plus Cycling Club was founded by Cecil Cooke in 1951. Cecil Cooke was an enthusiastic club cyclist who was President of the Hertfordshire DA of the CTC, from soon after its inception in 1928 to May 1937. He was also the first secretary of the Veterans Time Trials Association (VTTA) established in 1943. The objects of the club set out in the original handbook were "to promote cycling fixtures of a sociable character in the London Home Counties area and to provide for the interests of members in such other ways as may be decided upon". The annual subscription was five shillings (25p).

The club was originally based in London and rides were at the weekend. In addition to the Sunday rides, there was an active programme of social events on Saturdays in the autumn and winter. After a few years of rides from the four quarters of London, new sections were formed in the various parts of southern and eastern England, extending as far as Bournemouth in the south and East Northants in the north. In 1978, a section was started in Northern Ireland.

Around 1967 day time Tuesday and Thursday rides were started in Hertfordshire and Essex to cater for the growing number of retired members. Over the years, mid-week rides gradually replaced Sunday rides as the mainstay of the club.

A series of open events was introduced in 2011 to mark the club's diamond jubilee and this featured in an interview on Phoenix FM.

In January 2013 the club was featured in a 4-page article in Cycling Active published by IPC Media, which stated that "Founded in 1951, the Forty Plus Cycling Club caters, as its name would suggest, for riders of a more elegant vintage. It’s a national club, albeit at its most active in the south of England, and it caters for riders from a variety of backgrounds..." and proclaimed that "the Bradley Wiggins Effect hasn't just been confined to young racers keen to emulate their hero".

Some sections of the club go on cycle tours abroad, as a local reporter found when he joined a Southend Section day ride in the autumn of 2014. The article in the Rayleigh Review describes the day ride and mentions their 500 mile cycle tour from Krakow to Berlin that summer.
