= Bahamas at the 1984 Summer Olympics =

- Flag of the Bahamas
- IOC code: BAH
- NOC: Bahamas Olympic Committee

in Los Angeles
- Competitors: 22 (17 men and 5 women) in 4 sports
- Flag bearer: Brad Cooper
- Medals: Gold 0 Silver 0 Bronze 0 Total 0

Summer Olympics appearances (overview)
- 1952; 1956; 1960; 1964; 1968; 1972; 1976; 1980; 1984; 1988; 1992; 1996; 2000; 2004; 2008; 2012; 2016; 2020; 2024

The Bahamas competed at the 1984 Summer Olympics in Los Angeles, United States. The nation returned to the Olympic Games after participating in the American-led boycott of the 1980 Summer Olympics.

== Athletics ==
Men
Track & road events

| Athlete | Event | Heat | | Quarterfinal | | Semifinal | | Final | |
| Athlete | Event | Result | Rank | Result | Rank | Result | Rank | Result | Rank |
|---|---|---|---|---|---|---|---|---|---|
| Allan Ingraham | 400 m | 46.72 | 3 Q | 46.14 | 7 | did not advance | | | |
| Audrick Lightbourne | 100 m | 10.64 | 4 q | 10.59 | 8 | did not advance | | | |
| Dudley Parker | 100 m | 10.65 | 2 Q | 10.58 | 6 | did not advance | | | |
| Dudley Parker | 200 m | 21.12 | 2 Q | 21.10 | 7 | did not advance | | | |
| Greg Rolle | 400 m hurdles | 50.41 | 2 Q | 50.16 | 7 | did not advance | | | |

Field events

| Athlete | Event | Qualification | | Final | |
| Athlete | Event | Distance | Position | Distance | Position |
|---|---|---|---|---|---|
| Brad Cooper | Discus throw | 53.70 | 16 | did not advance | |
| Steve Hanna | Long jump | 7.10 | 21 | did not advance | |
| Steve Hanna | Triple jump | 16.14 | 14 | did not advance | |
| Lyndon Sands | Long jump | 7.32 | 19 | did not advance | |
| Joey Wells | Long jump | 7.89 | 7 Q | 7.97 | 6 |
| Steve Wray | High jump | NM | | did not advance | |

Women
Track & road events

| Athlete | Event | Heat | | Quarterfinal | | Semifinal | | Final | |
| Athlete | Event | Result | Rank | Result | Rank | Result | Rank | Result | Rank |
|---|---|---|---|---|---|---|---|---|---|
| Eldece Clarke-Lewis | 100 m | 11.61 | 4 Q | 11.85 | 5 | did not advance | | | |
| Pauline Davis-Thompson | 100 m | 11.51 | 1 Q | 11.61 | 4 Q | 11.70 | 7 | did not advance | |
| Pauline Davis-Thompson | 200 m | 23.37 | 2 Q | 22.97 | 4 Q | 23.02 | 7 | did not advance | |
| Eldece Clarke-Lewis; Pauline Davis-Thompson; Debbie Greene; Oralee Fowler | 4 × 100 m relay | 44.15 | 4 q | —N/a | | | | 44.18 | 6 |

Field events

| Athlete | Event | Qualification | | Final | |
| Athlete | Event | Distance | Position | Distance | Position |
|---|---|---|---|---|---|
| Shonel Ferguson | Long jump | 6.19 | 12 q | 6.44 | 8 |

== Boxing ==
Men

| Athlete | Event | 1 Round | 2 Round | 3 Round | Quarterfinals | Semifinals | Final | |
| Athlete | Event | Opposition Result | Opposition Result | Opposition Result | Opposition Result | Opposition Result | Opposition Result | Rank |
|---|---|---|---|---|---|---|---|---|
| Andre Seymour | Flyweight | Oppe Pinto (PAR); L 0–5 | did not advance | | | | | |
| Steve Larrimore | Light Welterweight | BYE | Philimon Ayesu (MAW); W 3–2 | Mirko Puzović (YUG); L 0–5 | did not advance | | | |
| Philip Pinder | Light Heavyweight | Jean-Paul Nanga (CMR); L 0–5 | did not advance | | | | | |

== Sailing ==
Men

| Athlete | Event | Race | | | | | | | Net points | Final rank |
| Athlete | Event | 1 | 2 | 3 | 4 | 5 | 6 | 7 | Net points | Final rank |
|---|---|---|---|---|---|---|---|---|---|---|
| Thomas Nisbet | Windglider | ~~DNF~~ | 32 | 34 | RET | 35 | 36 | RET | 251.0 | 38 |

Open

| Athlete | Event | Race | | | | | | | Net points | Final rank |
| Athlete | Event | 1 | 2 | 3 | 4 | 5 | 6 | 7 | Net points | Final rank |
|---|---|---|---|---|---|---|---|---|---|---|
| Montague Higgs; Steven Kelly | Star | 11 | ~~16~~ | 6 | 3 | 7 | 11 | 11 | 81.4 | 10 |

== Swimming ==
Men

| Athlete | Event | Heat | | Semifinal | | Final | |
| Athlete | Event | Time | Rank | Time | Rank | Time | Rank |
|---|---|---|---|---|---|---|---|
| David Morley | 100 metre backstroke | 1:01.29 | 31 | Did not advance | | | |
| David Morley | 200 metre backstroke | 2:18.17 | 31 | Did not advance | | | |
| David Morley | 200 metre individual medley | 2:16.85 | 31 | Did not advance | | | |
| Sean Nottage | 100 metre freestyle | 53.66 | 37 | Did not advance | | | |
| Sean Nottage | 200 metre freestyle | 1:57.54 | 40 | Did not advance | | | |
| Sean Nottage | 100 metre butterfly | 58.73 | 38 | Did not advance | | | |

== See also ==
- Bahamas at the 1983 Pan American Games
