= Bahamas at the 2000 Summer Olympics =

- Flag of the Bahamas
- IOC code: BAH
- NOC: Bahamas Olympic Committee
- Website: www.bahamasolympiccommittee.org

in Sydney
- Competitors: 25 (16 men and 9 women) in 3 sports
- Flag bearer: Pauline Davis-Thompson
- Medals Ranked 35th: Gold 2 Silver 0 Bronze 1 Total 3

Summer Olympics appearances (overview)
- 1952; 1956; 1960; 1964; 1968; 1972; 1976; 1980; 1984; 1988; 1992; 1996; 2000; 2004; 2008; 2012; 2016; 2020; 2024

The Bahamas competed at the 2000 Summer Olympics in Sydney, Australia.This marked the first time The Bahamas won an Olympic gold medal as an independent nation since gaining independence in 1973, and the first time the nation won a gold medal since the 1964 Tokyo games when the country was still a part of the British Empire.

== Medalists ==
Medal	Name	Sport	Event	Date
Gold	Pauline Davis-Thompson	Athletics	Women's 200 metres	28 September
Gold	Savatheda Fynes; Chandra Sturrup; Pauline Davis-Thompson; Debbie Ferguson; Eldece Clarke-Lewis	Athletics	Women's 4 × 100 metres relay	30 September
Bronze	Avard Moncur; Troy McIntosh; Carl Oliver; Chris Brown; Timothy Munnings	Athletics	Men's 4 × 400 metres relay	30 September

== Competitors ==
The following is the list of number of competitors in the Games.

Sport	Men	Women	Total
Athletics	10	9	19
Swimming	4	0	4
Tennis	2	0	2
Total	16	9	25

== Athletics ==
Men
Track & road events

Athlete	Event	Heat		Quarterfinal		Semifinal		Final	
Athlete	Event	Result	Rank	Result	Rank	Result	Rank	Result	Rank
Chris Brown	400 m	45.80	2 Q	45.76	6	Did not advance			
Dominic Demeritte	200 m	21.47	6	Did not advance					
Troy McIntosh	400 m	47.06	6	Did not advance					
Avard Moncur	400 m	45.23	1 Q	45.43	3 Q	45.18	5	Did not advance	
Andrew Tynes	200 m	21.00	5	Did not advance					
Renward Wells	100 m	10.47	5	Did not advance					
Renward Wells	200 m	20.95	3 Q	21.26	8	Did not advance			
Renward Wells; Dominic Demeritte; Iram Lewis; Wellington Saunders-Whymms	4 × 100 m relay	39.57	4	Did not advance					
Avard Moncur; Troy McIntosh; Carl Oliver; Chris Brown; Tim Munnings*	4 × 400 m relay	3:01.50	3 q	—N/a		2:59.02	3 Q	2:59.23	3rd place, bronze medalist(s)

Women
Track & road events

Athlete	Event	Heat		Quarterfinal		Semifinal		Final	
Athlete	Event	Result	Rank	Result	Rank	Result	Rank	Result	Rank
Christine Amertil	400 m	53.12	5	Did not advance					
Pauline Davis-Thompson	200 m	22.61	2 Q	22.72	2 Q	22.38	1 Q	22.27	1st place, gold medalist(s)
Debbie Ferguson-McKenzie	100 m	11.10	1 Q	11.18	2 Q	11.34	4 Q	11.29	8
Debbie Ferguson-McKenzie	200 m	23.31	2 Q	22.72	1 Q	22.62	2 Q	22.37	4
Savatheda Fynes	100 m	11.18	1 Q	11.10	1 Q	11.16	4 Q	11.22	7
Chandra Sturrup	100 m	11.31	1 Q	11.22	3 Q	11.31	2 Q	11.21	5
Chandra Sturrup	200 m	23.09	3 Q	23.21	5	Did not advance			
Tonique Williams-Darling	400 m	53.43	6	Did not advance					
Savatheda Fynes; Chandra Sturrup; Pauline Davis-Thompson; Debbie Ferguson-McKenzie; Eldece Clarke-Lewis	4 × 100 m relay	42.58	1 Q	—N/a		42.42	1 Q	41.95	1st place, gold medalist(s)

Field events

Athlete	Event	Qualification		Final	
Athlete	Event	Distance	Position	Distance	Position
Laverne Eve	Javelin throw	58.36	16	Did not advance	
Jackie Edwards	Long jump	6.60	11 q	6.59	6

== Swimming ==
Men

Athlete	Event	Heat		Semifinal		Final	
Athlete	Event	Time	Rank	Time	Rank	Time	Rank
Jeremy Knowles	200 metre breaststroke	2:20.31	36	Did not advance			
Jeremy Knowles	200 metre individual medley	2:06.85	35	Did not advance			
Jeremy Knowles	400 metre individual medley	4:26.87	31	Did not advance			
Allan Murray	50 metre freestyle	23.34	37	Did not advance			
Christopher Murray	100 metre freestyle	51.93	40	Did not advance			
Nicholas Rees	100 metre butterfly	57.23	57	Did not advance			

== Tennis ==
Athlete	Event	Round of 32	Round of 16	Quarterfinals	Semifinals	Final / BM	
Athlete	Event	Opposition Score	Opposition Score	Opposition Score	Opposition Score	Opposition Score	Rank
Mark Knowles; Mark Merklein	Men's doubles	Marques / Mota (POR); W 6-7 (7–9), 6–4, 7–5	O'Brien / Palmer (USA); W 6–2, 6–4	Adams / J-F de Jager (RSA); L 6–4, 2–6, 12–14	Did not advance		5

== See also ==
- Bahamas at the 1998 Central American and Caribbean Games
- Bahamas at the 1999 Pan American Games
