= Bahamas at the 1992 Summer Olympics =

- Flag of the Bahamas
- IOC code: BAH
- NOC: Bahamas Olympic Committee
- Website: www.bahamasolympiccommittee.org

in Barcelona
- Competitors: 14 (12 men and 2 women) in 4 sports
- Flag bearer: Troy Kemp
- Medals Ranked 54th: Gold 0 Silver 0 Bronze 1 Total 1

Summer Olympics appearances (overview)
- 1952; 1956; 1960; 1964; 1968; 1972; 1976; 1980; 1984; 1988; 1992; 1996; 2000; 2004; 2008; 2012; 2016; 2020; 2024; 2028

The Bahamas competed at the 1992 Summer Olympics in Barcelona, Spain.

== Medalists ==
Medal	Name	Sport	Event	Date
Bronze	Frank Rutherford	Athletics	Men's triple jump	3 August

== Competitors ==
The following is the list of the number of competitors in the Games.

Sport	Men	Women	Total
Athletics	6	2	8
Sailing	2	0	2
Swimming	2	0	2
Tennis	2	0	2
Total	12	2	14

== Athletics ==
Men
Field events

Athlete	Event	Qualification		Final	
Athlete	Event	Distance	Position	Distance	Position
Norbert Elliott	Triple jump	15.85	33	did not advance	
Craig Hepburn	Long jump	7.89	13	did not advance	
Wendell Lawrence	Triple jump	16.70	17	did not advance	
Troy Kemp	High jump	2.26	12 q	2.31	7
Frank Rutherford	Triple jump	17.28	2 Q	17.36	3rd place, bronze medalist(s)
Ian Thompson	High jump	2.23	16	did not advance	

Women
Track & road events

Athlete	Event	Heat		Quarterfinal		Semifinal		Final	
Athlete	Event	Result	Rank	Result	Rank	Result	Rank	Result	Rank
Pauline Davis-Thompson	100 m	11.48	2 Q	11.31	3 Q	11.34	5	did not advance	
Pauline Davis-Thompson	200 m	23.47	3 Q	22.44	3 Q	22.61	6	did not advance	

Field events

Athlete	Event	Qualification		Final	
Athlete	Event	Distance	Position	Distance	Position
Jackie Edwards	Long jump	6.40	20	did not advance	

== Sailing ==
Open

Athlete	Event	Race							Net points	Final rank
Athlete	Event	1	2	3	4	5	6	7	Net points	Final rank
Steven Kelly; William Holowesko	Star	17	14	10	~~22~~	9	12	18	116.0	17

== Swimming ==
Men

Athlete	Event	Heat		Semifinal		Final	
Athlete	Event	Time	Rank	Time	Rank	Time	Rank
Timothy Eneas	100 metre backstroke	1:03.10	48	Did not advance			
Timothy Eneas	100 metre butterfly	1:00.11	59	Did not advance			
Allan Murray	50 metre freestyle	23.55	21	Did not advance			
Allan Murray	100 metre freestyle	52.43	43	Did not advance			

== Tennis ==
Athlete	Event	Round of 32	Round of 16	Quarterfinals	Semifinals	Final / BM	
Athlete	Event	Opposition Score	Opposition Score	Opposition Score	Opposition Score	Opposition Score	Rank
Roger Smith	Men's singles	Cherkasov (EUN); L 1-6, 0-6, 6-3, 1-6	did not advance				
Mark Knowles; Roger Smith	Men's doubles	J Fitzgerald / T Woodbridge (AUS); L 2-6, 3-6, 7-6 (6-4), 6-4, 3-6	did not advance				

== See also ==
- Bahamas at the 1991 Pan American Games
