= Bahamas at the 2012 Summer Olympics =

- Flag of the Bahamas
- IOC code: BAH
- NOC: Bahamas Olympic Committee
- Website: www.bahamasolympiccommittee.org

in London
- Competitors: 24 in 2 sports
- Flag bearers: Chris Brown (opening); Chandra Sturrup (closing)
- Medals Ranked 50th: Gold 1 Silver 0 Bronze 0 Total 1

Summer Olympics appearances (overview)
- 1952; 1956; 1960; 1964; 1968; 1972; 1976; 1980; 1984; 1988; 1992; 1996; 2000; 2004; 2008; 2012; 2016; 2020; 2024; 2028

The Bahamas competed at the 2012 Summer Olympics in London, United Kingdom from 27 July to 12 August 2012. The Bahamas Olympic Association sent a total of 24 athletes to these Games, 14 men and 10 women, to compete only in athletics and swimming. The nation's participation at the Olympic games marked its sixteenth appearance as an independent nation.

The Bahamas' only medal was won in athletics. On 10 August, Chris Brown, Michael Mathieu, Ramon Miller, and Demetrius Pinder ended their Olympic journey for the national team by winning the gold medal in the men's 4 × 400 metres relay. Brown, silver medalist in the relay event in Beijing, became the nation's first male flag bearer at the opening ceremony since 1996.

== Medalists ==
Medal	Name	Sport	Event	Date
Gold	Chris Brown; Demetrius Pinder; Michael Mathieu; Ramon Miller	Athletics	Men's 4 × 400 m relay	10 August

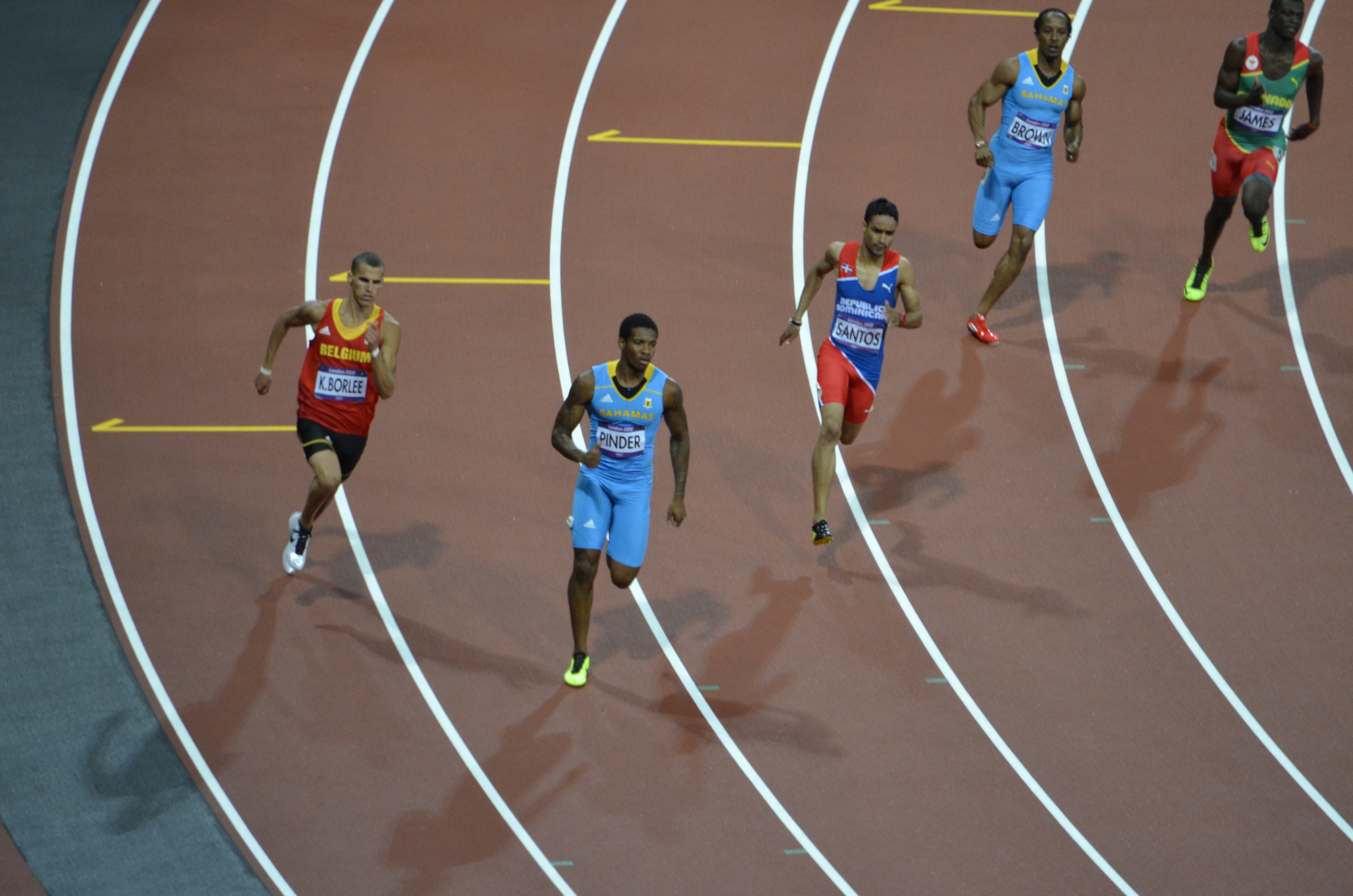
Pinder and Brown at the Men's 400 m

== Athletics ==
Athletes from the Bahamas achieved qualifying standards in the following athletics events (up to a maximum of 3 athletes in each event at the 'A' Standard, and 1 at the 'B' Standard):

Key

- Note–Ranks given for track events are within the athlete's heat only
- Q = Qualified for the next round
- q = Qualified for the next round as a fastest loser or, in field events, by position without achieving the qualifying target
- NR = National record
- N/A = Round not applicable for the event
- Bye = Athlete not required to compete in round

Men
Track & road events

Athlete	Event	Heat		Quarterfinal		Semifinal		Final	
Athlete	Event	Result	Rank	Result	Rank	Result	Rank	Result	Rank
Derrick Atkins	100 m	Bye		10.22	2 Q	10.08	4	did not advance	
Chris Brown	400 m	45.40	1 Q	—N/a		44.67	2 Q	44.79	4
Warren Fraser	100 m	Bye		10.27	4	did not advance			
Trevorvano Mackey	200 m	21.28	7	—N/a		did not advance			
Michael Mathieu	200 m	20.62	3 Q	—N/a		DSQ		did not advance	
Ramon Miller	400 m	45.57	2 Q	—N/a		45.11	4	did not advance	
Demetrius Pinder	400 m	44.92	1 Q	—N/a		44.94	2 Q	44.98	7
Shamar Sands	110 m hurdles	DSQ		—N/a		did not advance			
Chris Brown; Michael Mathieu; Ramon Miller; Wesley Neymour; Demetrius Pinder; Andrae Williams	4 × 400 m relay	2:58.87	1 Q	—N/a				2:56.72	1st place, gold medalist(s)

Field events

Athlete	Event	Qualification		Final	
Athlete	Event	Distance	Position	Distance	Position
Trevor Barry	High jump	2.21	=16	did not advance	
Raymond Higgs	Long jump	7.76	21	did not advance	
Leevan Sands	Triple jump	17.17	2 Q	17.19	5
Donald Thomas	High jump	2.16	=30	did not advance	

Women
Track & road events

Athlete	Event	Heat		Quarterfinal		Semifinal		Final	
Athlete	Event	Result	Rank	Result	Rank	Result	Rank	Result	Rank
Debbie Ferguson-McKenzie	100 m	Bye		11.32	5	did not advance			
Debbie Ferguson-McKenzie	200 m	23.49	7	—N/a		did not advance			
Sheniqua Ferguson	100 m	Bye		11.35	3 Q	11.32	7	did not advance	
Ivanique Kemp	100 m hurdles	13.51	3 Q	—N/a		13.56	8	did not advance	
Shaunae Miller	400 m	DNF		—N/a		did not advance			
Anthonique Strachan	200 m	22.75	2 Q	—N/a		22.82	5	did not advance	
Christine Amertil; Debbie Ferguson-McKenzie; Sheniqua Ferguson; V'Alonee Robinson; Amara Jones; Anthonique Strachan; Chandra Sturrup	4 × 100 m relay	43.07	6	—N/a				did not advance	

Field events

Athlete	Event	Qualification		Final	
Athlete	Event	Distance	Position	Distance	Position
Bianca Stuart	Long jump	6.32	18	did not advance	

== Swimming ==
Swimmers from the Bahamas achieved qualifying standards in the following events (up to a maximum of 2 swimmers in each event at the Olympic Qualifying Time, and potentially 1 at the Olympic Selection Time):

Women

Athlete	Event	Heat		Semifinal		Final	
Athlete	Event	Time	Rank	Time	Rank	Time	Rank
Arianna Vanderpool-Wallace	50 m freestyle	24.85	=7 Q	24.64	6 Q	24.69	8
Arianna Vanderpool-Wallace	100 m freestyle	53.73	6 Q	54.12	10	did not advance	

== See also ==
- Bahamas at the 2011 Pan American Games
