= Jeremy Knowles (swimmer) =

Bahamian swimmer (born 1981)

Personal information
- Full name: Jeremy Daniel Knowles
- Nationality: Bahamas
- Born: 30 August 1981 (age 44) Nassau, Bahamas
- Height: 5 ft 9 in (1.75 m)
- Weight: 75 kg (165 lb)

Sport
- Sport: Swimming
- Strokes: IM, Fly
- College team: Auburn Tigers (USA) (2000–2004)
Medal record
Summer Universiade
Bronze medal – third place	2003 Daegu	200 m butterfly
Central American and Caribbean Games
Silver medal – second place	2006 Cartagena	200 m butterfly
Silver medal – second place	2006 Cartagena	200 m medley
Silver medal – second place	2006 Cartagena	400 m medley
Bronze medal – third place	2006 Cartagena	100 m butterfly

Jeremy Daniel Knowles (born 30 August 1981 in Nassau) is a 3-time Olympic and Bahamian-Record-holding swimmer from The Bahamas.

He was the Bahamas flag-bearer at the 2007 Pan American Games.

== International tournaments ==
- 1997 Short Course Worlds
- 1999 Pan Am Games
- 2000 Olympics
- 2003 Summer Universiade
- 2003 Pan Am Games
- 2004 Olympics
- 2006 Commonwealth Games
- 2007 World Championships
- 2007 Pan Am Games
- 2008 Olympics
