= Bahamas at the Paralympics =

- Flag of the Bahamas
- IPC code: BAH
- Medals: Gold 0 Silver 2 Bronze 3 Total 5

Summer appearances
- 1972; 1976; 1980; 1984; 1988; 1992–2024

The Bahamas competed at the Paralympic Games from 1972 to 1988. It participated in every Summer Paralympics during those years and won a total of two silver and three bronze medals. The country never competed at the Winter Paralympics and has not appeared at any Paralympic Games since 1988.

== Medalists ==
Medal	Name	Games	Sport	Event
Silver	John Sands	1980 Arnhem	Athletics	Men's club throw 1B
Silver	Christine Morgan	1984 New York/Stoke Mandeville	Athletics	Women's discus throw 6
Bronze	John Sands	1980 Arnhem	Athletics	Men's discus throw 1B
Bronze	Christine Morgan	1984 New York/Stoke Mandeville	Athletics	Women's pentathlon 6
Bronze	Christine Morgan	1980 Arnhem	Swimming	Women's 100 m freestyle 6
