= Bahamas at the 2016 Summer Olympics =

- Flag of the Bahamas
- IOC code: BAH
- NOC: Bahamas Olympic Committee
- Website: www.bahamasolympiccommittee.org

in Rio de Janeiro
- Competitors: 28 in 3 sports
- Flag bearers: Shaunae Miller (opening); Leevan Sands (closing)
- Medals Ranked 51st: Gold 1 Silver 0 Bronze 1 Total 2

Summer Olympics appearances (overview)
- 1952; 1956; 1960; 1964; 1968; 1972; 1976; 1980; 1984; 1988; 1992; 1996; 2000; 2004; 2008; 2012; 2016; 2020; 2024

The Bahamas, officially the Commonwealth of The Bahamas, competed at the 2016 Summer Olympics in Rio de Janeiro, Brazil, from 5 to 21 August 2016. The nation's participation at these Games marked its seventeenth appearance as an independent nation.

The Bahamas Olympic Committee sent a total of 28 athletes, 19 men and 9 women, to the Games, participating in athletics, swimming, and rowing. Eleven of them had previously competed in London 2012, with Chris Brown leading the men's 4 × 400 m relay squad for the nation's title defense at his fifth consecutive Olympics. Other notable athletes from the Bahamian team featured triple jumper and Beijing 2008 bronze medalist Leevan Sands, swimmer Arianna Vanderpool-Wallace, who rounded out the top eight from London in the women's 50 m freestyle, and sprinter Shaunae Miller, who served as the nation's flag bearer in the opening ceremony.

Bahamas left Rio de Janeiro with two medals awarded to the nation's track and field athletes. Among the medalists were the men's 4 × 400 m relay squad, highlighted by Brown and his fellow sprinters Michael Mathieu and Demetrius Pinder, and Miller, who sprang an upset over American top sprinter Allyson Felix with a head-first dive to earn the first gold medal awarded to a Bahamian athlete since Tonique Williams-Darling topped the podium in 2004.

== Medalists ==
Medal	Name	Sport	Event	Date
Gold	Shaunae Miller	Athletics	Women's 400 m	15 August
Bronze	Chris Brown; Steven Gardiner; Michael Mathieu; Stephen Newbold; Demetrius Pinder; Alonzo Russell	Athletics	Men's 4 × 400 m relay	20 August

== Athletics (track and field) ==
Bahamian athletes have so far achieved qualifying standards in the following athletics events (up to a maximum of 3 athletes in each event):

A total of 24 athletes (18 men and 6 women) were selected to the Bahamian track and field roster as part of the nation's official team announcement on 21 July 2016, with Chris Brown racing in the 400 metres and leading the men's relay squad at his fifth straight Olympics.

Key

- Note–Ranks given for track events are within the athlete's heat only
- Q = Qualified for the next round
- q = Qualified for the next round as a fastest loser or, in field events, by position without achieving the qualifying target
- NR = National record
- N/A = Round not applicable for the event
- Bye = Athlete not required to compete in round

Track & road events
Men

Athlete	Event	Heat		Quarterfinal		Semifinal		Final	
Athlete	Event	Result	Rank	Result	Rank	Result	Rank	Result	Rank
Adrian Griffith	100 m	Bye		10.53	8	Did not advance			
Shavez Hart	100 m	Bye		10.28	5	Did not advance			
Jamial Rolle	100 m	Bye		10.68	8	Did not advance			
Shavez Hart	200 m	20.74	7	—N/a		Did not advance			
Demetrius Pinder	200 m	DSQ		—N/a		Did not advance			
Teray Smith	200 m	20.66	6	—N/a		Did not advance			
Chris Brown	400 m	45.56	4	—N/a		Did not advance			
Steven Gardiner	400 m	45.24	2 Q	—N/a		44.72	5	Did not advance	
Alonzo Russell	400 m	46.23	5	—N/a		Did not advance			
Jeffery Gibson	400 m hurdles	52.77	45	—N/a		Did not advance			
Chris Brown; Steven Gardiner; Michael Mathieu; Stephen Newbold; Demetrius Pinder; Alonzo Russell	4 × 400 m relay	2:59.64	2 Q	—N/a				2:58.49	3rd place, bronze medalist(s)

Women

Athlete	Event	Heat		Quarterfinal		Semifinal		Final	
Athlete	Event	Result	Rank	Result	Rank	Result	Rank	Result	Rank
Tynia Gaither	100 m	Bye		11.56	5	Did not advance			
Sheniqua Ferguson	200 m	23.62	8	—N/a		Did not advance			
Tynia Gaither	200 m	22.90	3 q	—N/a		23.45	8	Did not advance	
Anthonique Strachan	200 m	22.96	3	—N/a		Did not advance			
Shaunae Miller	400 m	51.16	1 Q	—N/a		49.91	2 Q	49.44	1st place, gold medalist(s)
Pedrya Seymour	100 m hurdles	12.85	3 Q	—N/a		12.64	2 Q	12.76	6

Field events

Athlete	Event	Qualification		Final	
Athlete	Event	Distance	Position	Distance	Position
Trevor Barry	Men's high jump	2.29	10 q	2.25	11
Donald Thomas	Men's high jump	2.29	9 q	2.29	=7
Jamal Wilson	Men's high jump	2.22	25	Did not advance	
Latario Collie-Minns	Men's triple jump	NM	—	Did not advance	
Leevan Sands	Men's triple jump	16.53	18	Did not advance	
Bianca Stuart	Women's long jump	6.45	9	Did not advance	

== Rowing ==
For the first time in Olympic history, Bahamas has qualified one boat in the women's single sculls for the Games at the 2016 Latin American Continental Qualification Regatta in Valparaíso, Chile.

Athlete	Event	Heats		Repechage		Quarterfinals		Semifinals		Final	
Athlete	Event	Time	Rank	Time	Rank	Time	Rank	Time	Rank	Time	Rank
Emily Morley	Women's single sculls	9:22.12	6 R	8:22.77	4 SE/F	Bye		8:46.09	3 FE	8:56.36	30

Qualification Legend: FA=Final A (medal); FB=Final B (non-medal); FC=Final C (non-medal); FD=Final D (non-medal); FE=Final E (non-medal); FF=Final F (non-medal); SA/B=Semifinals A/B; SC/D=Semifinals C/D; SE/F=Semifinals E/F; QF=Quarterfinals; R=Repechage

== Swimming ==
Bahamian swimmers have so far achieved qualifying standards in the following events (up to a maximum of 2 swimmers in each event at the Olympic Qualifying Time (OQT), and potentially 1 at the Olympic Selection Time (OST)):

Athlete	Event	Heat		Semifinal		Final	
Athlete	Event	Time	Rank	Time	Rank	Time	Rank
Dustin Tynes	Men's 100 m breaststroke	1:03.71	44	Did not advance			
Joanna Evans	Women's 200 m freestyle	2:01.27	37	Did not advance			
Joanna Evans	Women's 400 m freestyle	4:07.60	13	—N/a		Did not advance	
Joanna Evans	Women's 800 m freestyle	8:42.93	23	—N/a		Did not advance	
Arianna Vanderpool-Wallace	Women's 50 m freestyle	24.77	=13 Q	24.60	9	Did not advance	
Arianna Vanderpool-Wallace	Women's 100 m freestyle	54.56	18	Did not advance			

== See also ==
- Bahamas at the 2015 Pan American Games
