= Myles Pritchard =

Bahamian sailor

Personal information
- Nationality: Bahamian
- Born: 27 August 1958 (age 66)

Sport
- Sport: Sailing

Myles Pritchard (born 27 August 1958) is a Bahamian sailor. He competed in the Star event at the 1996 Summer Olympics.
