= Bahamas at the 1988 Summer Olympics =

- Flag of the Bahamas
- IOC code: BAH
- NOC: Bahamas Olympic Committee

in Seoul
- Competitors: 16 (12 men and 4 women) in 5 sports
- Flag bearer: Durward Knowles
- Medals: Gold 0 Silver 0 Bronze 0 Total 0

Summer Olympics appearances (overview)
- 1952; 1956; 1960; 1964; 1968; 1972; 1976; 1980; 1984; 1988; 1992; 1996; 2000; 2004; 2008; 2012; 2016; 2020; 2024

The Bahamas competed at the 1988 Summer Olympics in Seoul, South Korea.

== Competitors ==
The following is the list of number of competitors in the Games.

| Sport | Men | Women | Total |
|---|---|---|---|
| Athletics | 8 | 3 | 11 |
| Boxing | 1 | – | 1 |
| Diving | 0 | 1 | 1 |
| Sailing | 2 | 0 | 2 |
| Swimming | 1 | 0 | 1 |
| Total | 12 | 4 | 16 |

== Athletics ==
Men
Track & road events

| Athlete | Event | Heat | | Quarterfinal | | Semifinal | | Final | |
| Athlete | Event | Result | Rank | Result | Rank | Result | Rank | Result | Rank |
|---|---|---|---|---|---|---|---|---|---|
| Fabian Whymns | 100 m | 10.70 | 4 | Did not advance | | | | | |
| Derrick Knowles | 110 m hurdles | 14.22 | 3 Q | 14.30 | 6 | Did not advance | | | |

Field events

| Athlete | Event | Qualification | | Final | |
| Athlete | Event | Distance | Position | Distance | Position |
|---|---|---|---|---|---|
| Brad Cooper | Discus throw | 59.74 | 16 | Did not advance | |
| Norbert Elliott | Triple jump | 16.43 | 8 Q | 16.19 | 10 |
| Steve Hanna | Long jump | 7.54 | 24 | Did not advance | |
| Patterson Johnson | Triple jump | 16.03 | 20 | Did not advance | |
| Troy Kemp | High jump | 2.19 | 20 | Did not advance | |
| Frank Rutherford | Triple jump | 15.84 | 26 | Did not advance | |

Women
Track & road events

| Athlete | Event | Heat | | Quarterfinal | | Semifinal | | Final | |
| Athlete | Event | Result | Rank | Result | Rank | Result | Rank | Result | Rank |
|---|---|---|---|---|---|---|---|---|---|
| Pauline Davis-Thompson | 100 m | 11.20 | 1 Q | 11.21 | 4 Q | 11.12 | 6 | Did not advance | |
| Pauline Davis-Thompson | 200 m | 23.08 | 2 Q | 22.92 | 3 Q | 22.67 | 7 | Did not advance | |

Field events

| Athlete | Event | Qualification | | Final | |
| Athlete | Event | Distance | Position | Distance | Position |
|---|---|---|---|---|---|
| Laverne Eve | Javelin throw | 60.02 | 16 | Did not advance | |
| Shonel Ferguson | Long jump | 6.34 | 18 | Did not advance | |

== Boxing ==
Men

| Athlete | Event | 1 Round | 2 Round | 3 Round | Quarterfinals | Semifinals | Final | |
| Athlete | Event | Opposition Result | Opposition Result | Opposition Result | Opposition Result | Opposition Result | Opposition Result | Rank |
|---|---|---|---|---|---|---|---|---|
| Andre Seymour | Featherweight | Orlando Dollente (PHI); W 5-0 | Jarmo Eskelinen (FIN); W WO | Tomasz Nowak (POL); L 0-5 | Did not advance | | | |

== Diving ==
Women

| Athlete | Event | Preliminaries | | Final | |
| Athlete | Event | Points | Rank | Points | Rank |
|---|---|---|---|---|---|
| Lori Roberts | 3 m springboard | 292.95 | 27 | Did not advance | |

== Sailing ==
Open

| Athlete | Event | Race | | | | | | | Net points | Final rank |
| Athlete | Event | 1 | 2 | 3 | 4 | 5 | 6 | 7 | Net points | Final rank |
|---|---|---|---|---|---|---|---|---|---|---|
| Durward Knowles; Steven Kelly | Star | 18 | 19 | 17 | 17 | 11 | 18 | ~~DNC~~ | 136.0 | 19 |

== Swimming ==
Men

| Athlete | Event | Heat | | Semifinal | | Final | |
| Athlete | Event | Time | Rank | Time | Rank | Time | Rank |
|---|---|---|---|---|---|---|---|
| Garvin Ferguson | 50 metre freestyle | 24.25 | 32 | Did not advance | | | |
| Garvin Ferguson | 100 metre freestyle | 53.62 | 48 | Did not advance | | | |

== See also ==
- Bahamas at the 1987 Pan American Games
