= Robert Dunkley (sailor) =

Bahamian sailor

Personal information
- Nationality: Bahamian
- Born: 13 January 1949 (age 76)

Sport
- Sport: Sailing
- Club: Royal Nassau Sailing Club

Robert Dunkley (born 13 January 1949) is a Bahamian sailor. He competed in the Laser event at the 1996 Summer Olympics.
