= Bahamas at the 1972 Summer Olympics =

- Flag of the Bahamas
- IOC code: BAH
- NOC: Bahamas Olympic Committee

in Munich
- Competitors: 20 (19 men and 1 woman) in 4 sports
- Flag bearer: Mike Sands
- Medals: Gold 0 Silver 0 Bronze 0 Total 0

Summer Olympics appearances (overview)
- 1952; 1956; 1960; 1964; 1968; 1972; 1976; 1980; 1984; 1988; 1992; 1996; 2000; 2004; 2008; 2012; 2016; 2020; 2024

The Bahamas competed at the 1972 Summer Olympics in Munich, West Germany. Twenty competitors, nineteen men and one woman, took part in thirteen events in four sports.

== Athletics ==
Men
Track & road events

Athlete	Event	Heat		Quarterfinal		Semifinal		Final	
Athlete	Event	Result	Rank	Result	Rank	Result	Rank	Result	Rank
Walter Callander	100 m	10.78	4	did not advance					
Kevin Johnson	100 m	10.61	6	did not advance					
Kevin Johnson	200 m	21.70	5	did not advance					
Franklin Rahming	400 m	48.30	5	did not advance					
Mike Sands	100 m	10.67	2 Q	10.50	5	did not advance			
Mike Sands	200 m	21.61	5 Q	DNS		did not advance			
Danny Smith	110 m hurdles	14.46	4	did not advance					
Danny Smith; Harrison Lockhart; Walter Callander; Mike Sands	4 × 100 m relay	40.48	5	did not advance					

Field events

Athlete	Event	Qualification		Final	
Athlete	Event	Distance	Position	Distance	Position
Timothy Barrett	Triple jump	15.51	27	did not advance	

Women
Track & road events

Athlete	Event	Heat		Quarterfinal		Semifinal		Final	
Athlete	Event	Result	Rank	Result	Rank	Result	Rank	Result	Rank
Claudette Powell	100 m	12.01	7	did not advance					

== Boxing ==
Men

Athlete	Event	1 Round	2 Round	3 Round	Quarterfinals	Semifinals	Final	
Athlete	Event	Opposition Result	Opposition Result	Opposition Result	Opposition Result	Opposition Result	Opposition Result	Rank
Garry Davis	Welterweight	BYE	Maurice Hope (GBR); L 0–5	did not advance				
Nat Knowles	Middleweight	Faustino Quinales (VEN); W DSQ	Nazif Kuran (TUR); L TKO-1	did not advance				

== Cycling ==
Two cyclist represented the Bahamas in 1972.

=== Track ===
1000m time trial

Athlete	Event	Time	Rank
Laurence Burnside	Men's 1000m time trial	1:20.31	30

Men's Sprint

Athlete	Event	Round 1	Repechage 1	Round 2	Repechage 2	Repechage Finals	Quarterfinals	Semifinals	Final	
Athlete	Event	Time Speed (km/h)	Rank	Opposition Time Speed (km/h)	Opposition Time Speed (km/h)	Opposition Time Speed (km/h)	Opposition Time Speed (km/h)	Opposition Time Speed (km/h)	Opposition Time Speed (km/h)	Rank
Geoffrey Burnside	Men's sprint	Marino (ITA); Young (USA); L	Pedersen (DEN); L	did not advance						

== Sailing ==
Open

Athlete	Event	Race							Net points	Final rank
Athlete	Event	1	2	3	4	5	6	7	Net points	Final rank
Durward Knowles; Montague Roscoe Higgs	Star	12	2	10	12	~~DNF~~	16	14	97.0	13
Bobby Symonette; Craig Symonette; Percy Knowles	Soling	23	22	24	15	23	~~DNS~~	—	137.0	25
Godfrey Kelly; Christopher McKinney; David Kelly	Dragon	~~23~~	17	18	12	15	5	—	96.0	19

== See also ==
- Bahamas at the 1971 Pan American Games
