= Cecil Cooke =

Bahamian sailor

Personal information
- Full name: Cecil George Cooke
- Born: May 31, 1923 Nassau, New Providence, Bahamas
- Died: May 1, 1983 (aged 59) Nassau, New Providence, Bahamas
Medal record
Sailing
Representing Bahamas
Olympic Games
Gold medal – first place	1964 Tokyo	Star class

Cecil George Cooke (May 31, 1923 – May 1, 1983) was a sailor and Olympic champion from the Bahamas. He competed at the 1964 Summer Olympics in Tokyo, where he won a gold medal in the Star class, together with Durward Knowles. He was born in and died in Nassau, New Providence, Bahamas.

== See also ==
- Forty Plus Cycling Club
