= Sean Nottage =

Bahamian swimmer (born 1965)

Personal information
- Born: 14 April 1965 (age 61)

Sport
- Sport: Swimming

Sean Nottage (born 14 April 1965) is a Bahamian swimmer. He competed in three events at the 1984 Summer Olympics.
