= Kenneth Albury =

Bahamian sailor (1920–1998)

Personal information
- Nationality: Bahamian
- Born: 9 January 1920; Abaco Islands, Bahamas
- Died: 1998 (aged 77–78); Nassau, Bahamas

Sport
- Sport: Sailing

Kenneth Harrison Earl Albury (9 January 1920 – 1998) was a Bahamian sailor. He competed at the 1952, 1956, 1960 and the 1968 Summer Olympics.
