= Flag of the Bahamas =

Commonwealth of The Bahamas
- Use: National flag
- Proportion: 1:2
- Adopted: July 10, 1973 (standardised 1 March 2006)
- Design: A horizontal triband of aquamarine (top and bottom) and gold with a black equilateral triangle aligned to the hoist-side.
- Designed by: Hervis Bain
- Use: Civil ensign
- Proportion: 1:2
- Design: A white cross on a red field, the national flag in the canton
- Use: State ensign
- Proportion: 1:2
- Design: A blue cross on a white field, the national flag in the canton
- Use: Naval ensign
- Proportion: 1:2
- Design: A red cross on a white field, the national flag in the canton

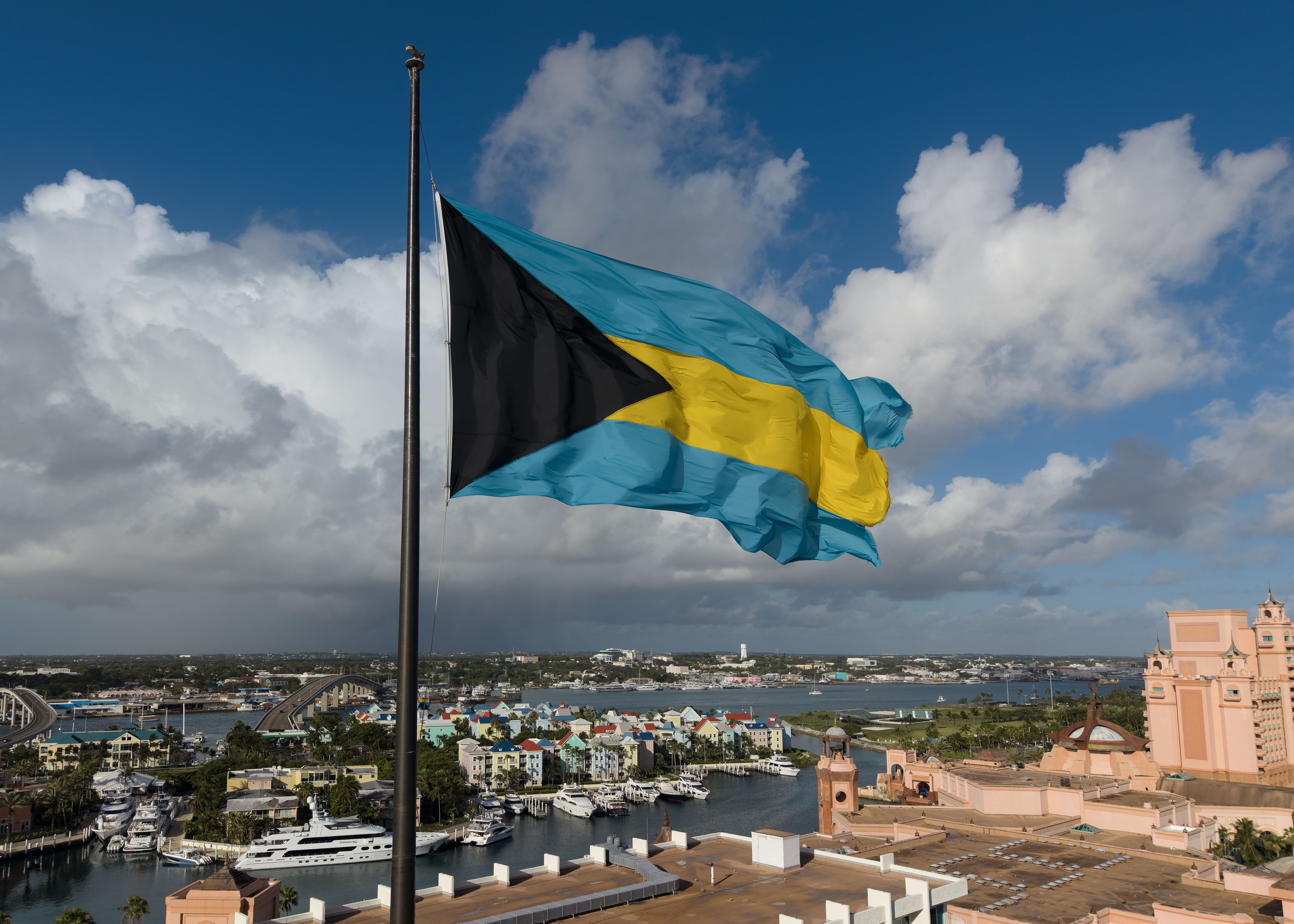
Paradise Island; Bahamas flag in the foreground

The national flag of the Commonwealth of The Bahamas consists of a black triangle situated at the hoist with three horizontal bands: aquamarine, gold and aquamarine. Adopted in 1973 to replace the British Blue Ensign defaced with the emblem of the Crown Colony of the Bahama Islands, it has been the flag of The Bahamas since the country gained independence that year. The design of the present flag incorporated the elements of various submissions made in a national contest for a new flag prior to independence.

== History ==
The Bahamas became a crown colony of the United Kingdom within its colonial empire in 1717. Under colonial rule, the Bahama Islands used the British Blue Ensign and defaced it with the emblem of the territory. This was inspired by the ousting of the pirates, and consisted of a scene depicting a British ship chasing two pirate ships out at the high seas encircled by the motto "Expulsis piratis restituta commercia" ("Pirates expelled, commerce restored"). The emblem was designed in around 1850, but did not receive official approval until 1964.

The Bahama Islands were granted internal autonomy in 1964. After the 1972 elections, the territory started negotiations on independence. A search for a national flag began soon after, with a contest being held to determine the new design. Instead of choosing a single winning design, it was decided that the new flag was to be an amalgamation of the elements from various submissions. It was first hoisted at midnight on 10 July 1973, the day The Bahamas became an independent country. The new country also changed its name from the Bahama Islands to The Bahamas upon independence.

== Design ==
The colours of the flag carry cultural, political, and regional meanings. The gold alludes the shining sun – as well as other key land-based natural resources – while the aquamarine epitomises the water surrounding the country. The black symbolises the "strength", "vigour, and force" of the Bahamian people, while the directed triangle evokes their "enterprising and determined" nature to cultivate the abundant natural resources on the land and in the sea.

=== Colours ===
Colour	Pantone	RGB	Hexadecimal	CMYK
Aquamarine	3145	0, 119, 139	#00778B	100, 0, 24, 30
Yellow	123	255, 199, 44	#FFC72C	0, 19, 89, 0
Black	None	0, 0, 0	#000000	0, 0, 0, 100

== Legal issues ==
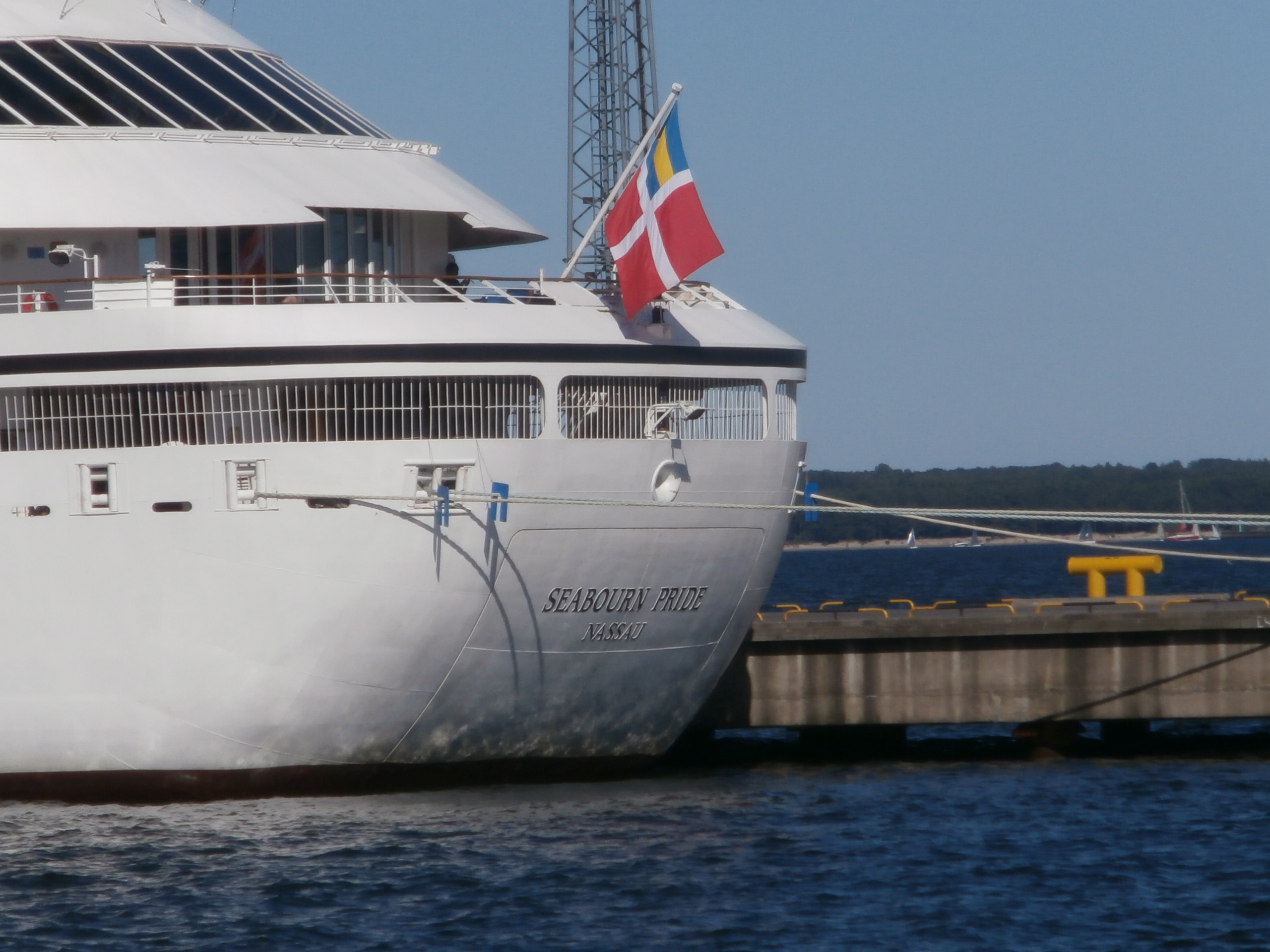
Bahamian civil ensign on the Seabourn Pride, 2013

The Bahamian flag is often used as a flag of convenience by foreign-owned merchant vessels. Under the Law on Merchant Shipping Act 1976 (amended in 1982), any domestic or foreign vessel – regardless of country of origin or place of registration – can be registered in The Bahamas "without difficulty". Furthermore, the ship's crew is not restricted by nationality and "ordinary crew members" have "virtually no requirements for qualification". This lack of regulation has led to ships flying flags of convenience – like The Bahamas' flag – having a reputation of possessing a "poor safety record". This came to light in November 2002, when the Greek oil tanker MV Prestige flying the flag of The Bahamas split into two and sank in the Atlantic Ocean off the north-western Spanish coast. This produced an oil slick of 60,000 tons of petroleum.

== Historical flags ==
Flag	Duration	Use	Description
	1869–1904	Flag of the Crown Colony of the Bahama Islands	A British Blue Ensign defaced with the emblem of the crown colony. This consisted of a British ship chasing two pirate ships out at the high seas and the motto "Expulsis piratis restituta commercia" (Pirates expelled, commerce restored).
	1869–1904	Civil Ensign of the Crown Colony of the Bahama Islands	A British Red Ensign defaced with the emblem of the crown colony. This consisted of a British ship chasing two pirate ships out at the high seas and the motto "Expulsis piratis restituta commercia" (Pirates expelled, commerce restored).
	1904–1923	Flag of the Crown Colony of the Bahama Islands	The crown on the crest was changed to a domed Tudor crown.
	1904–1923	Civil Ensign of the Crown Colony of the Bahama Islands	The crown on the crest was changed to a domed Tudor crown.
	1923–1953	Flag of the Crown Colony of the Bahama Islands	The crown on the crest was changed to a Tudor crown.
	1923–1953	Civil Ensign of the Crown Colony of the Bahama Islands	The crown on the crest was changed to a Tudor crown.
	1953–1964	Flag of the Crown Colony of the Bahama Islands	A British Blue Ensign defaced with the emblem of the crown colony featuring a St Edward's crown for the new monarch.
	1953–1964	Civil Ensign of the Crown Colony of the Bahama Islands	A British Red Ensign defaced with the emblem of the crown colony featuring a St Edward's crown for the new monarch.
	1964–1973	Flag of the Crown Colony of the Bahama Islands	A British Blue Ensign defaced with the emblem of the crown colony featuring a St Edward's crown.
	1964–1973	Civil Ensign of the Crown Colony of the Bahama Islands	A British Red Ensign defaced with the emblem of the crown colony featuring a St Edward's crown.
	1973–2006	Flag of The Bahamas	A horizontal triband of aquamarine (top and bottom) and gold with a black equilateral triangle aligned to the hoist-side. Despite being superseded by the standardised variant, it remains widely used to this day unofficially.

== Maritime flags ==
Civil ensign. Flag Ratio: 1:2

Civil jack. Flag Ratio: 1:2

Naval ensign. Flag Ratio: 1:2

Flag of the Auxiliary Fleet of the Navy. Flag Ratio: 1:2
