= Athletics at the 1979 Summer Universiade – Men's triple jump =

The men's triple jump event at the 1979 Summer Universiade was held at the Estadio Olimpico Universitario in Mexico City on 10 and 11 September 1979.

== Medalists ==
Gold	Silver	Bronze
Willie Banks; United States	Jaak Uudmäe; Soviet Union	Roberto Mazzucato; Italy

== Results ==
=== Qualification ===
Qualification mark: 16.00 m

Rank	Group	Athlete	Nationality	Result	Notes
1	B	Gennadiy Valyukevich	Soviet Union	16.99	Q
2	A	Willie Banks	United States	16.81	Q
3	B	Miloš Srejović	Yugoslavia	16.27	Q
4	A	Paolo Piapan	Italy	16.25	Q
4	B	Jaak Uudmäe	Soviet Union	16.25	Q
6	A	Béla Bakosi	Hungary	16.23	Q
6	B	Juan Velásquez	Cuba	16.23	Q
8	A	Bedros Bedrosian	Romania	16.22	Q
9	A	Ramón Cid	Spain	16.15	Q
10	B	José Luis Rodríguez	Spain	16.14	Q
11	B	Ioannis Afthinos	Greece	16.11	Q
11	B	Dennis Ivory	United States	16.11	Q
13	B	Roberto Mazzucato	Italy	16.03	Q
14	B	Alfredo Melão	Angola	15.79	
15	B	José Salazar	Venezuela	15.78	
16	B	Moham Diop	Senegal	15.02	

=== Final ===
Rank	Athlete	Nationality	#1	#2	#3	#4	#5	#6	Result	Notes
1st place, gold medalist(s)	Willie Banks	United States						17.23	17.23	
2nd place, silver medalist(s)	Jaak Uudmäe	Soviet Union							17.20	
3rd place, bronze medalist(s)	Roberto Mazzucato	Italy	16.52	16.75	16.66	16.87	16.68	16.29	16.87	
4	Ramón Cid	Spain	13.35	16.14	14.11	16.30	16.31	16.71w	16.71w	
5	Miloš Srejović	Yugoslavia							16.57	
6	Juan Velásquez	Cuba							16.37	
7	Béla Bakosi	Hungary							16.22	
8	Bedros Bedrosian	Romania							16.18	
9	Gennadiy Valyukevich	Soviet Union							15.98	
10	Ioannis Afthinos	Greece							15.94	
11	Dennis Ivory	United States							15.90	
12	Paolo Piapan	Italy							15.72	
13	José Luis Rodríguez	Spain							15.56	
