= 1979 European Athletics Indoor Championships – Men's triple jump =

The men's triple jump event at the 1979 European Athletics Indoor Championships was held on 25 February in Vienna.

== Results ==
Rank	Name	Nationality	Result	Notes
1st place, gold medalist(s)	Gennadiy Valyukevich	Soviet Union	17.02	
2nd place, silver medalist(s)	Anatoliy Piskulin	Soviet Union	16.97	
3rd place, bronze medalist(s)	Jaak Uudmäe	Soviet Union	16.91	
4	Gábor Katona	Hungary	16.54	
5	Béla Bakosi	Hungary	16.30	
6	Ramón Cid	Spain	16.16	
7	Roberto Mazzucato	Italy	16.13	
8	Karel Hradil	Czechoslovakia	15.89	
9	Paolo Piapan	Italy	15.87	
10	Hannu Puhakka	Finland	15.79	
