= Athletics at the 1980 Summer Olympics – Men's triple jump =

Men's triple jump at the Games of the XXII Olympiad
- Pictogram for athletics
- Venue: Central Lenin Stadium
- Date: 23 July 1980 (qualifying); 24 July 1980 (final)
- Competitors: 23 from 19 nations
- Winning distance: 17.35

Medalists
1st place, gold medalist(s)		Jaak Uudmäe; Soviet Union
2nd place, silver medalist(s)		Viktor Saneyev; Soviet Union
3rd place, bronze medalist(s)		João Carlos de Oliveira; Brazil

The men's triple jump event at the 1980 Summer Olympics in Moscow, Soviet Union had an entry list of 23 competitors, with two qualifying groups (23 jumpers) before the final (12) took place on Friday, July 25, 1980. The maximum number of athletes per nation had been set at 3 since the 1930 Olympic Congress. The top twelve and ties, and all those reaching 16.55 metres advanced to the final. The qualification round was held on Thursday, July 24, 1980.

The Soviet Union's Jaak Uudmäe and Viktor Saneyev won the first two places, ahead of Brazil's world record holder João Carlos de Oliveira. Both de Oliveira and Australia's Ian Campbell produced long jumps, but they were declared fouls by the officials and not measured; in Campbell's case, his longest jump was ruled a "scrape foul", with his trailing leg touching the track during the jump. Campbell insisted he hadn't scraped, and it was alleged the officials intentionally threw out his and de Oliveira's best jumps to favor the Soviets, similarly to a number of other events.

It was the fourth consecutive gold medal for the Soviet Union, and the eighth consecutive Games in which the Soviets made the podium. Saneyev became the first man to win four medals in the triple jump; de Oliveira was the tenth man to win two.

== Summary ==
=== Background ===
This was the 19th appearance of the event, which is one of 12 athletics events to have been held at every Summer Olympics. Only two finalists from the 1976 Games returned: three-time gold medalist Viktor Saneyev of the Soviet Union and bronze medalist João Carlos de Oliveira of Brazil. Benin, Ethiopia, the Seychelles, Vietnam, and Zambia each made their first appearance in the event. Finland competed for the 15th time, most of any nation competing in 1980 though behind the boycotting United States' 18 appearances.

The favorites included Oliveira, who held the world record, as well as Ian Campbell of Australia, Keith Connor of Great Britain, and the Soviet Union's Jaak Uudmäe and Yevgeni Anikin; all of these jumpers had exceeded 17 m earlier in the year. 34-year-old Viktor Saneyev, the third Soviet jumper, was the defending champion from the 1968, 1972 and 1976 Olympics, but came in with a season best of only 16.78.

=== Qualifying ===
All of these athletes qualified for the final; Campbell led with a first-round jump of 17.02, the only athlete to clear 17 metres. He was followed by the other Australian, Ken Lorraway, with 16.80 m.

=== Final ===
De Oliveira led after round one with 16.96, followed by Saneyev; Campbell had by far the longest jump of the round, but it was declared a foul. Uudmäe improved to third place in round two and then took the lead in round three with 17.35, his personal best; de Oliveira had his best measured jump, 17.22, immediately after this, and Saneyev improved to 17.04 to finish the round. In the remaining rounds, both Campbell and de Oliveira produced jumps that were long enough to overtake Uudmäe, but they were marked as fouls and therefore not measured, in Campbell's case, he was adjudged to have committed a "scrape foul", which if true, would have made the length of his jump virtually impossible.; neither of them recorded a mark after round three. Uudmäe produced his best jump in round four but it was ruled a foul. In round six Uudmäe jumped 17.28m which was the second best legal jump of the competition. The competition ended with Saneyev as the last jumper of the sixth and final round; he jumped 17.24, his best since the 1976 Olympics, to overtake de Oliveira for silver.

== Controversy ==
After the first day of athletics at the 1980 Olympics – July 24, the day of the triple jump qualification – Adriaan Paulen, the head of the International Amateur Athletic Federation (IAAF), had agreed to pull all IAAF inspectors from the field, leaving Soviet officials to judge all events without outside supervision. Allegations that the Soviets abused this situation to favor their own athletes started with the triple jump final and continued through the week, resulting in the IAAF inspectors returning for the final days.

Both Campbell and de Oliveira jumped beyond Uudmäe's leading mark more than once, but all of these jumps were declared fouls despite their protests. One of Campbell's jumps, perhaps the longest in the competition, was ruled a "scrape" foul: the officials claimed his trailing leg had touched the track during the step phase, which was against the rules at the time. Campbell insisted he hadn't scraped, stating it was impossible to scrape and still jump that far. Campbell's first jump, also a potential winner, was declared a normal foul; the Australian said he demanded to see the plasticine after the jump, and while there was a mark on it as expected after a foul, it was on the wrong side to have been produced by his take-off foot. The foul rulings on de Oliveira's longest jumps were also controversial, with both outside observers and de Oliveira himself feeling at least some, if not all, of those jumps should have been valid. Whether Campbell or de Oliveira had the longest jump in the competition is unclear.

The behavior of the Soviet audience, which whistled loudly during de Oliveira's jumps, also received negative attention, though the crowd did applaud de Oliveira after he shook hands with the board judges.

=== Mizuno allegations ===
Australian journalist Roy Masters has claimed the competition was not simply one part of a wider pattern of Soviet officials favoring the home team, but was specifically rigged so that Soviet jumpers with Mizuno shoes would win. According to Masters, Mizuno had been snubbed during the torch relay, and the organizers attempted to make up for it by fixing the triple jump.

== Competition format ==
The competition used the two-round format introduced in 1936. In the qualifying round, each jumper received three attempts to reach the qualifying distance of 16.55 metres; if fewer than 12 men did so, the top 12 (including all those tied) would advance. In the final round, each athlete had three jumps; the top eight received an additional three jumps, with the best of the six to count.

== Records ==
Prior to the competition, the existing world and Olympic records were as follows.

World record	João Carlos de Oliveira (BRA)	17.89	Mexico City, Mexico	15 October 1975
Olympic record	Viktor Saneyev (URS)	17.39	Mexico City, Mexico	17 October 1968

No new world and Olympic records were set during this competition.

== Schedule ==
All times are Moscow Time (UTC+3)

Date	Time	Round
Thursday, 24 July 1980	18:50	Qualifying
Friday, 25 July 1980	18:40	Final

== Results ==
=== Qualification ===
Rank	Athlete	Nation	1	2	3	Distance	Notes
1	Ian Campbell	Australia	17.02	—	—	17.02	Q
2	Ken Lorraway	Australia	15.84	16.29	16.80	16.80	Q
3	Yevgeny Anikin	Soviet Union	16.77	—	—	16.77	Q
4	Jaak Uudmäe	Soviet Union	16.03	16.69	—	16.69	Q
5	João Carlos de Oliveira	Brazil	X	16.62	—	16.62	Q
6	Keith Connor	Great Britain	16.57	—	—	16.57	Q
6	Viktor Saneyev	Soviet Union	16.57	—	—	16.57	Q
8	Armando Herrera	Cuba	16.26	X	16.49	16.49	q
9	Milan Spasojević	Yugoslavia	16.21	16.48	—	16.48	q
10	Béla Bakosi	Hungary	15.99	16.45	16.22	16.45	q
11	Christian Valetudie	France	15.99	16.43	16.39	16.43	q
12	Atanas Chochev	Bulgaria	16.20	16.42	16.17	16.42	q
13	Ramón Cid	Spain	16.20	X	16.04	16.20	
14	Moujhed Fahid Khalifa	Iraq	X	15.77	15.86	15.86	
15	Abdoulaye Diallo	Senegal	X	15.51	15.68	15.68	
16	Zdzisław Hoffmann	Poland	X	15.35	15.28	15.35	
17	Bogger Mushanga	Zambia	14.79	—	—	14.79	
18	Henri Dagba	Benin	X	13.64	14.71	14.71	
19	Dương Đức Thủy	Vietnam	14.51	14.19	14.59	14.59	
20	Arthure Agathine	Seychelles	X	13.99	14.21	14.21	
21	Yadessa Kuma	Ethiopia	13.49	13.60	X	13.60	
—	Olli Pousi	Finland	X	—	—	No mark	
—	Alejandro Herrera	Cuba	X	—	—	No mark	

=== Final ===
Rank	Athlete	Nation	1	2	3	4	5	6	Distance
1st place, gold medalist(s)	Jaak Uudmäe	Soviet Union	X	16.83	17.35	X	17.08	17.28	17.35
2nd place, silver medalist(s)	Viktor Saneyev	Soviet Union	16.85	16.53	17.04	X	17.07	17.24	17.24
3rd place, bronze medalist(s)	João Carlos de Oliveira	Brazil	16.96	X	17.22	X	X	X	17.22
4	Keith Connor	Great Britain	16.32	16.64	16.51	16.87	14.54	16.48	16.87
5	Ian Campbell	Australia	X	16.72	X	X	X	X	16.72
6	Atanas Chochev	Bulgaria	16.12	16.55	X	X	—	16.56	16.56
7	Béla Bakosi	Hungary	X	16.28	16.11	16.47	16.03	15.77	16.47
8	Ken Lorraway	Australia	16.12	16.44	16.20	16.40	—	15.70	16.44
9	Yevgeni Anikin	Soviet Union	16.12	15.75	X	Did not advance			16.12
10	Milan Spasojević	Yugoslavia	16.09	16.08	15.93	Did not advance			16.09
11	Armando Herrera	Cuba	15.90	X	16.03	Did not advance			16.03
—	Christian Valetudie	France	X	X	X	Did not advance			No mark

== See also ==
- 1976 Men's Olympic Triple Jump (Montreal)
- 1978 Men's European Championships Triple Jump (Prague)
- 1982 Men's European Championships Triple Jump (Athens)
- 1983 Men's World Championships Triple Jump (Helsinki)
- 1984 Men's Olympic Triple Jump (Los Angeles)
