= BTA Best Balkan Athlete of the Year =

- Awarded for: Best Balkan Athlete
- Country: The Balkans: Albania; Bosnia and Herzegovina; Bulgaria; Croatia; FR Yugoslavia (formerly); Greece; Kosovo; Montenegro; North Macedonia; Romania; Serbia; Serbia/Montenegro (formerly); Slovenia; Turkey; Yugoslavia (formerly)
- Presented by: Bulgarian News Agency (BTA)
- First award: 1973

Highlights
- Most awards: (Serbia) Novak Djokovic (8×)
- Website: bta.bg/en/news/sport

The BTA Best Balkan Athlete of the Year, Balkan Athlete of the Year, or simply Athlete of the Balkans (Bulgarian: БТА спортист на Балканите, romanized: BTA sportist na Balkanite) is an annual sports athlete of the year award. The winner of each year's award is announced by the Bulgarian News Agency (BTA). The award is given to the year's top performing individual athlete that has citizenship from one of the nations of the Balkans region, which includes the twelve nations of: Albania, Bosnia and Herzegovina, Bulgaria, Croatia, Greece, Kosovo, Montenegro, North Macedonia, Romania, Serbia, Slovenia, and Turkey, and previously included the former nations of Yugoslavia, FR Yugoslavia, and Serbia and Montenegro. The award winners are chosen by the votes of a panel of sports journalists and editors from the following ten Balkan nation's news media outlets: the Albanian Telegraphic Agency (ATA), the Bulgarian News Agency (BTA), which also announces each year's winners, the Romanian AGERPRES, the Greek Athens-Macedonian News Agency (ANA-MPA), the Turkish Anadolu Agency (AA), the Croatian News Agency (HINA), the Bosnia and Herzegovina Federal News Agency (FENA), the North Macedonia Media Information Agency (MIA), the Montenegrin News Agency (MINA), and the Serbian Tanjug.

All athletes that have citizenship from a country that is a part of the Balkans region, both men's and women's, and that compete in all age categories and all levels of competition, are eligible for the award. Balkan athletes from all sports competitions, both individual sports and team sports, are eligible for the award. Balkan athletes are also eligible for the award regardless of what country in the world that they compete in, as they do not have to compete in a Balkans nation to be eligible to win the award.

The first Balkan Athlete of the Year award was given for the year 1973. It was won by Svetla Zlateva, a Bulgarian sprinter and middle-distance runner. The Serbian tennis player Novak Djokovic, has won the most awards, having won the award a total of eight times (2011–2015, 2019, 2021, 2023).

== Balkan Athlete of the Year award winners (1973–present) ==
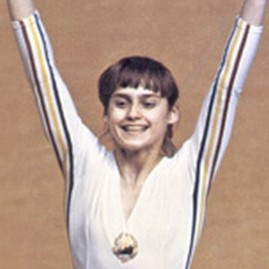
Nadia Comăneci was the Balkan Athlete of the Year three times (1975, 1976, 1980).

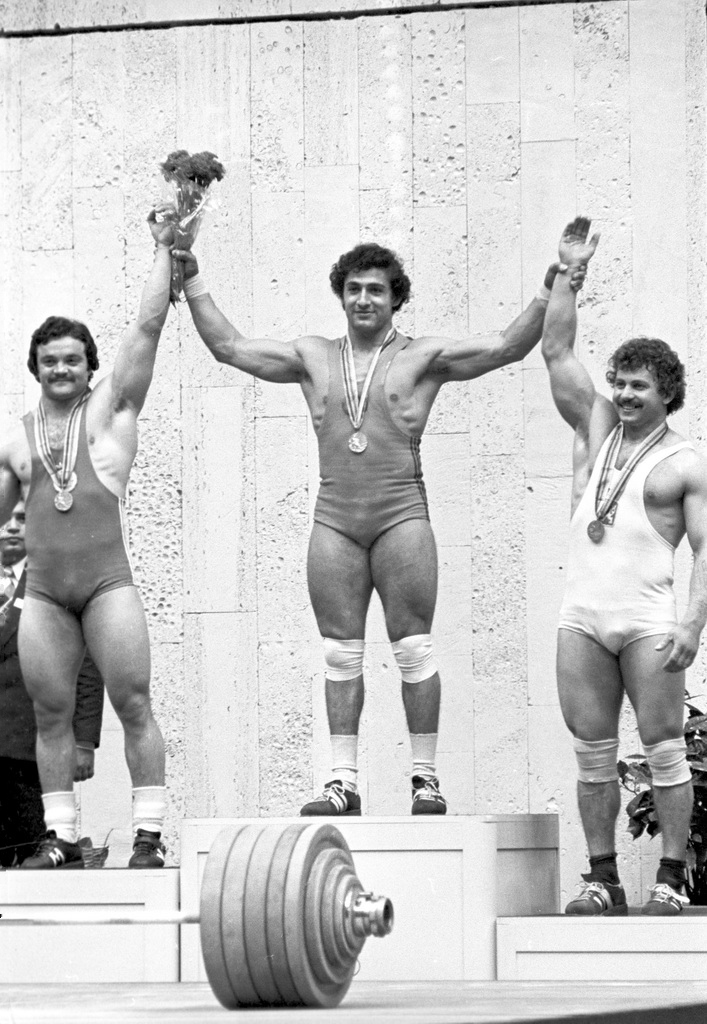
Blagoy Blagoev was the Balkan Athlete of the Year in 1982.

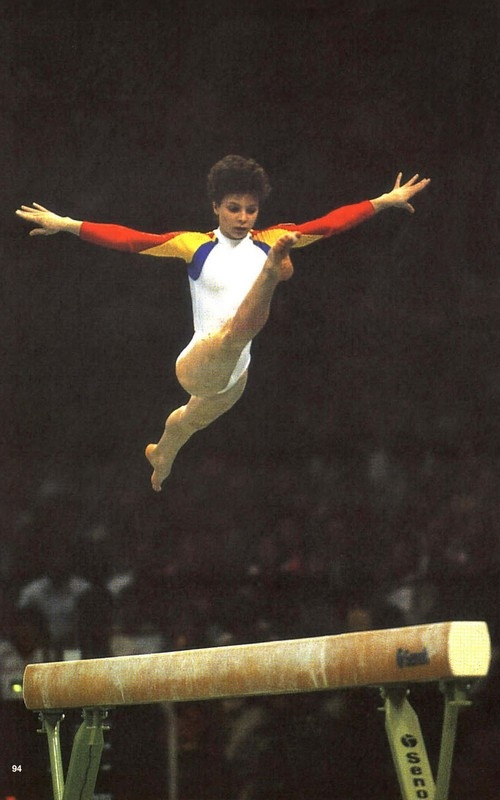
Daniela Silivaș was the Balkan Athlete of the Year in 1988.

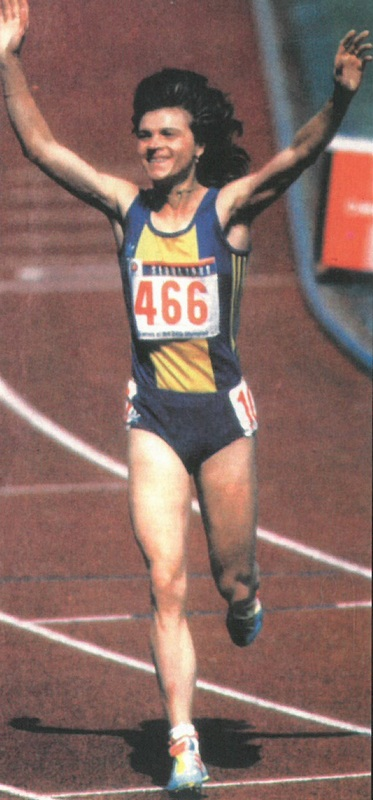
Paula Ivan was the Balkan Athlete of the Year in 1989.

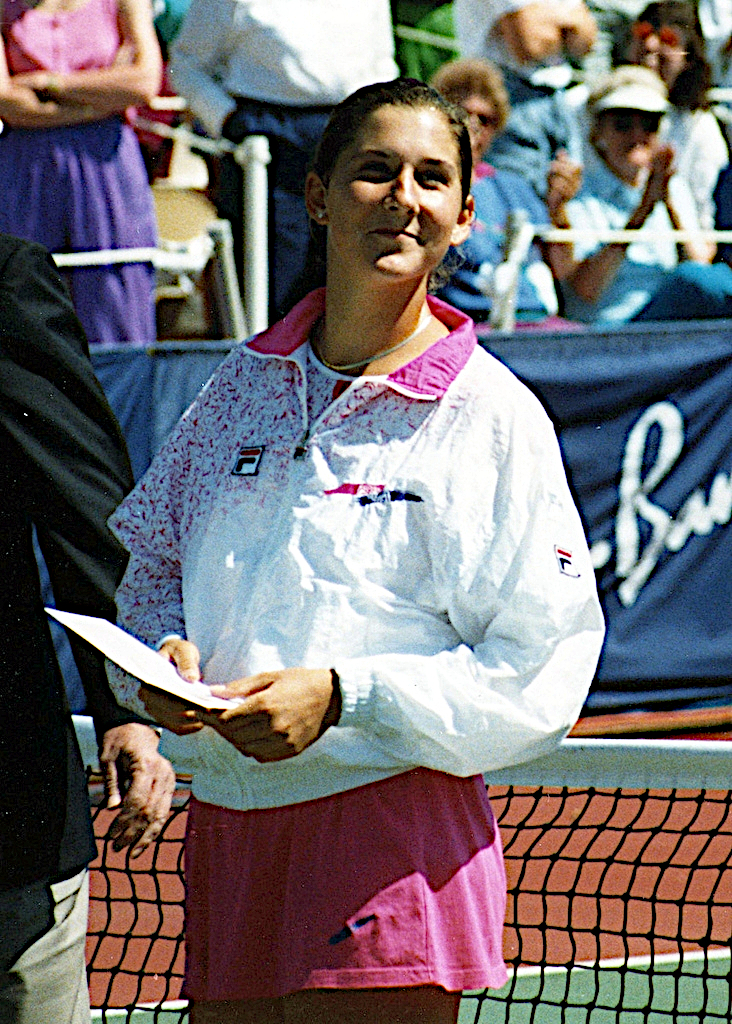
Monica Seles was the Balkan Athlete of the Year two times (1990 and 1991).

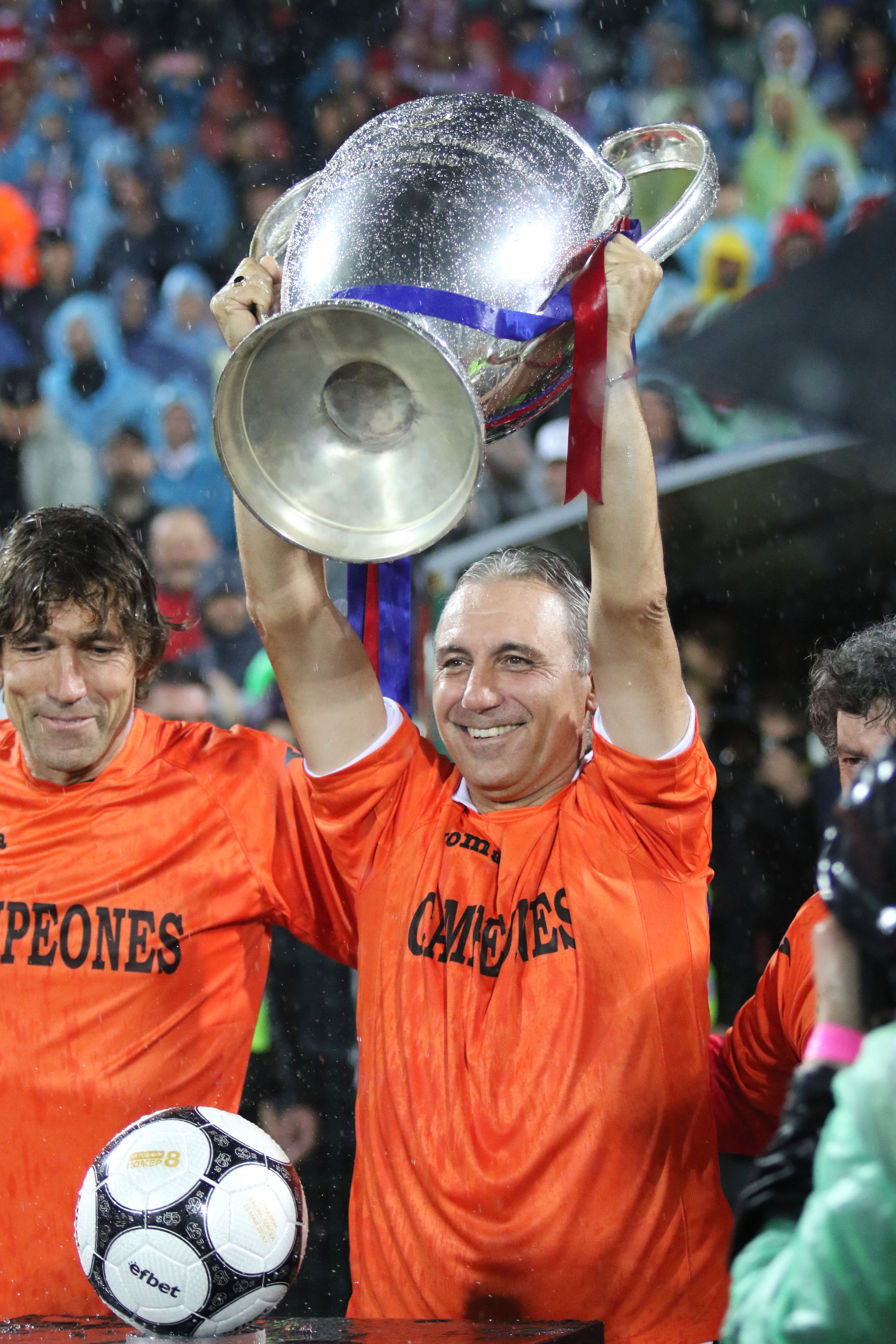
Hristo Stoichkov won the Balkan Athlete of the Year in 1994.

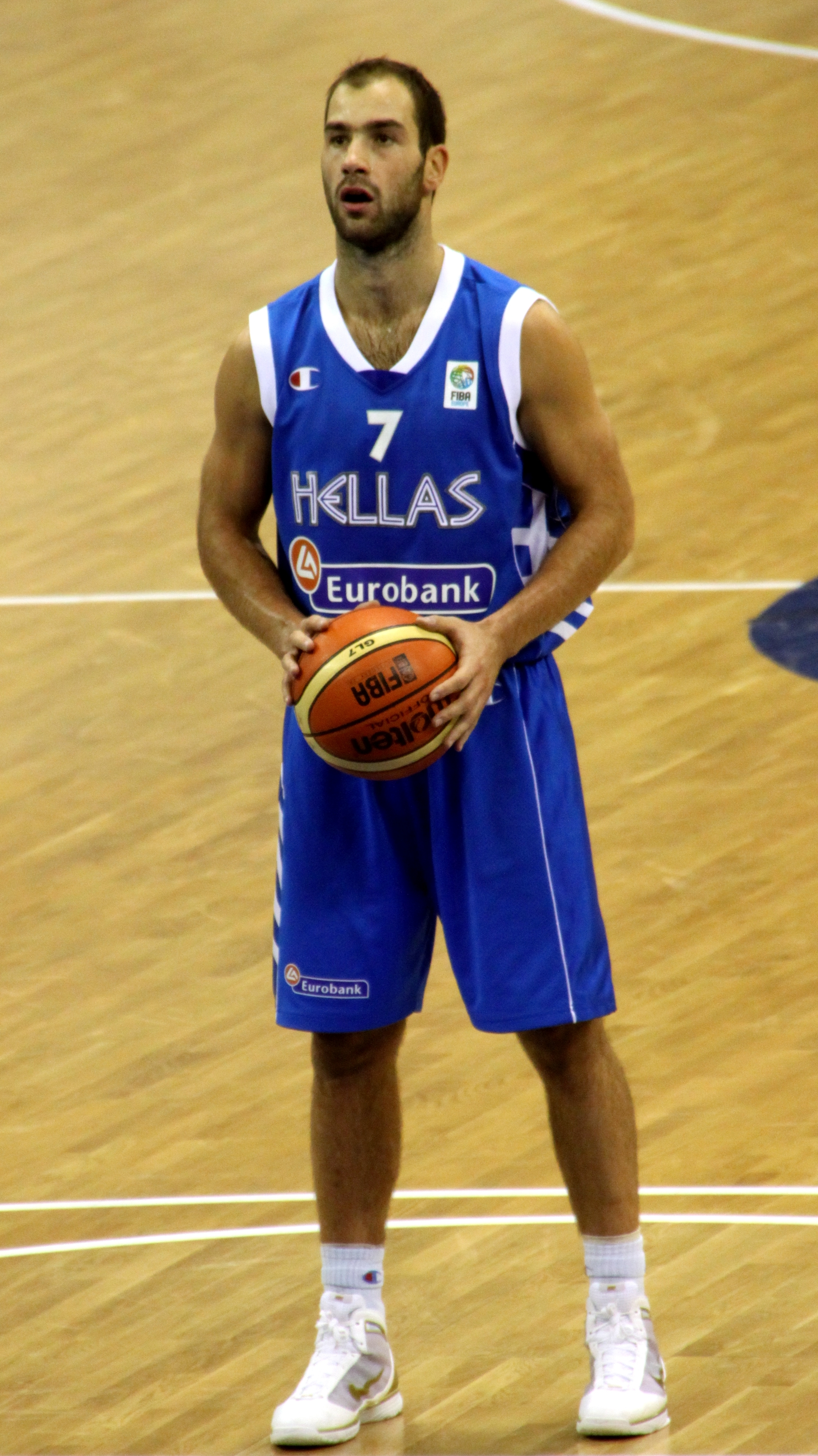
Vassilis Spanoulis won the Balkan Athlete of the Year in 2009.

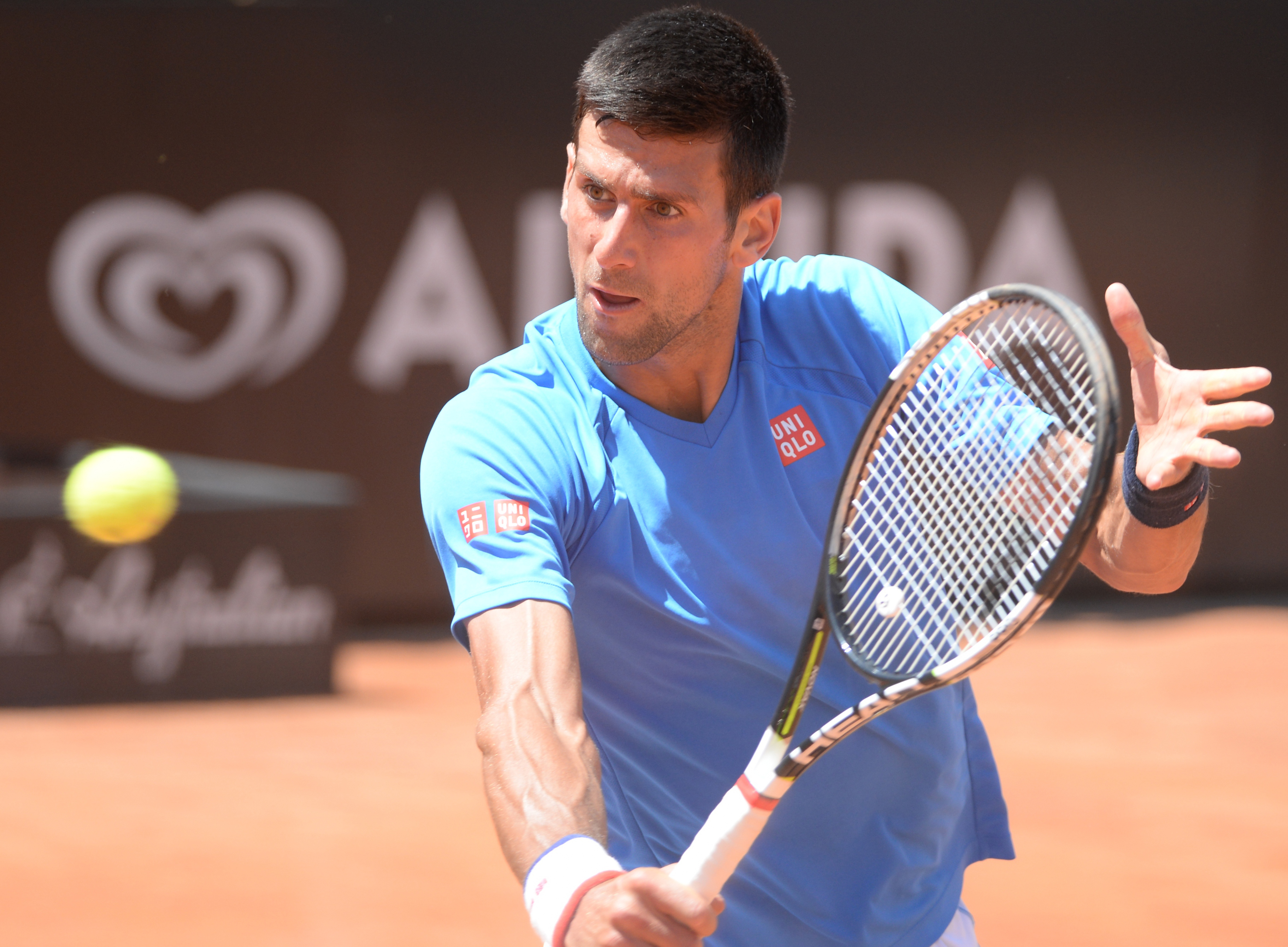
Novak Djokovic won the most Balkan Athlete of the Year awards, with 8 (2011, 2012, 2013, 2014, 2015, 2019, 2021, 2023).

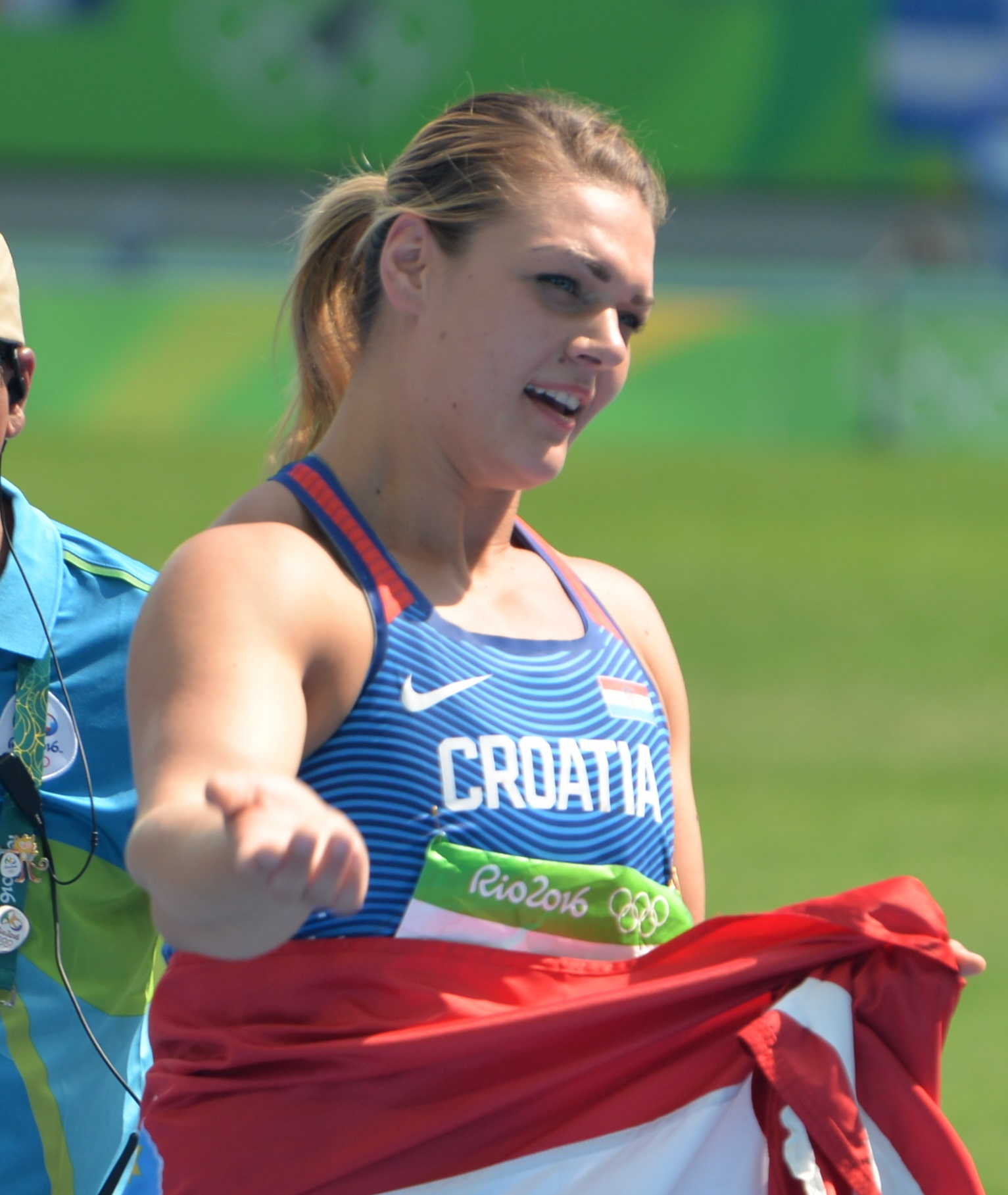
Sandra Perković won the Balkan Athlete of the Year in 2016.

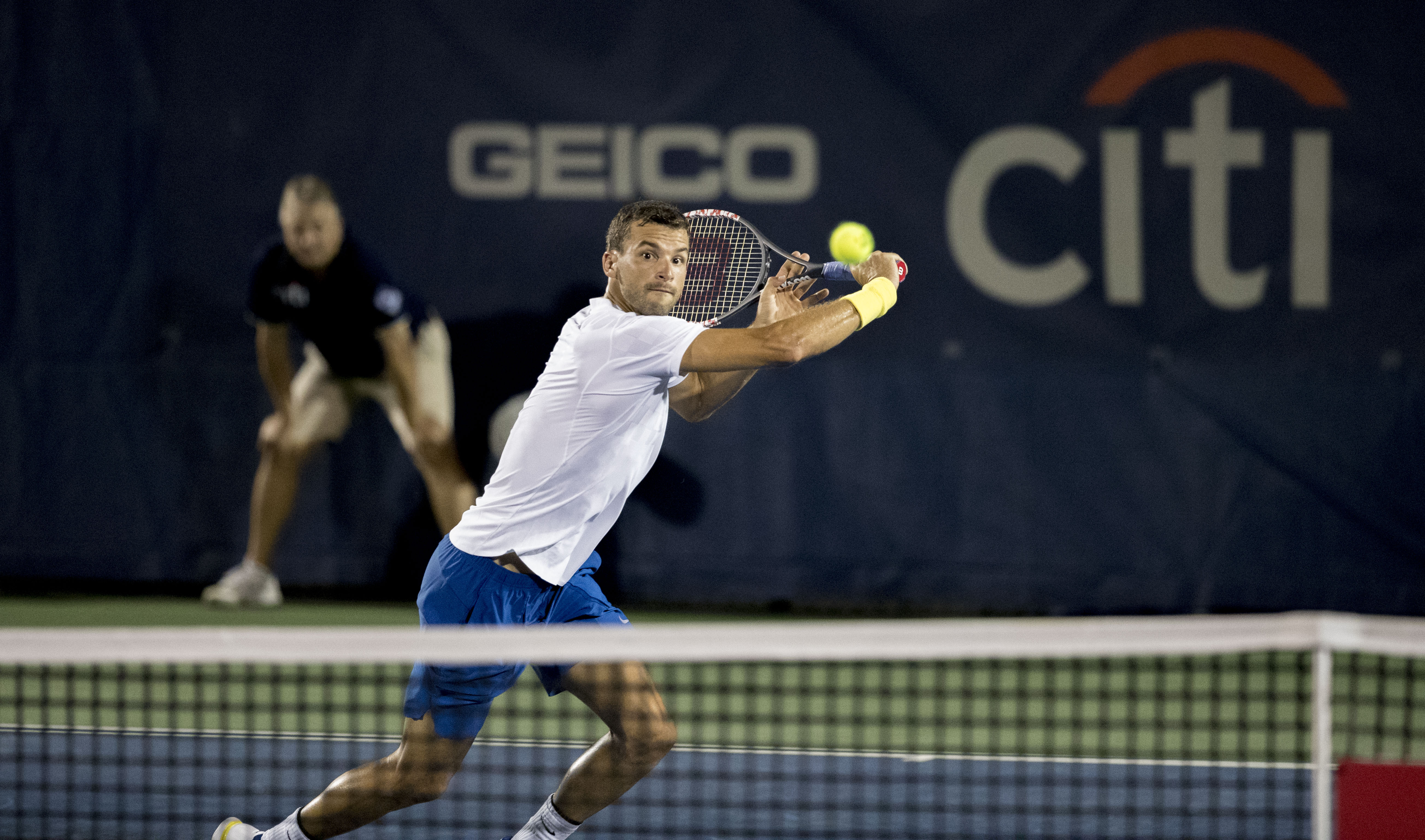
Grigor Dimitrov won the Balkan Athlete of the Year in 2017.

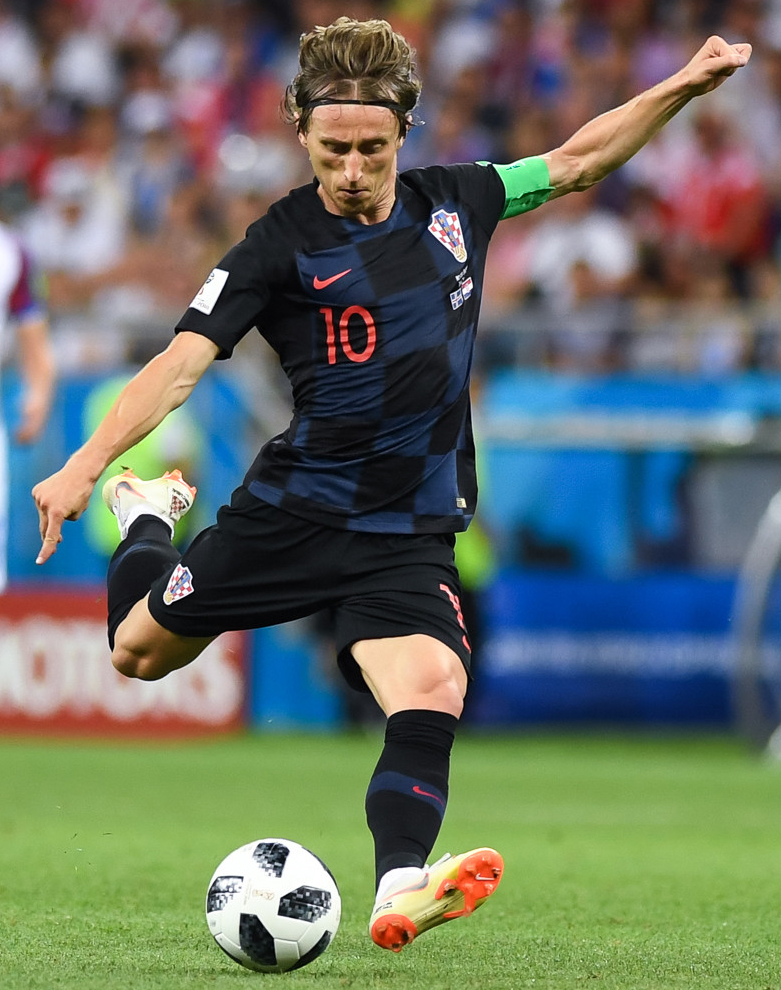
Luka Modrić won the Balkan Athlete of the Year in 2018.

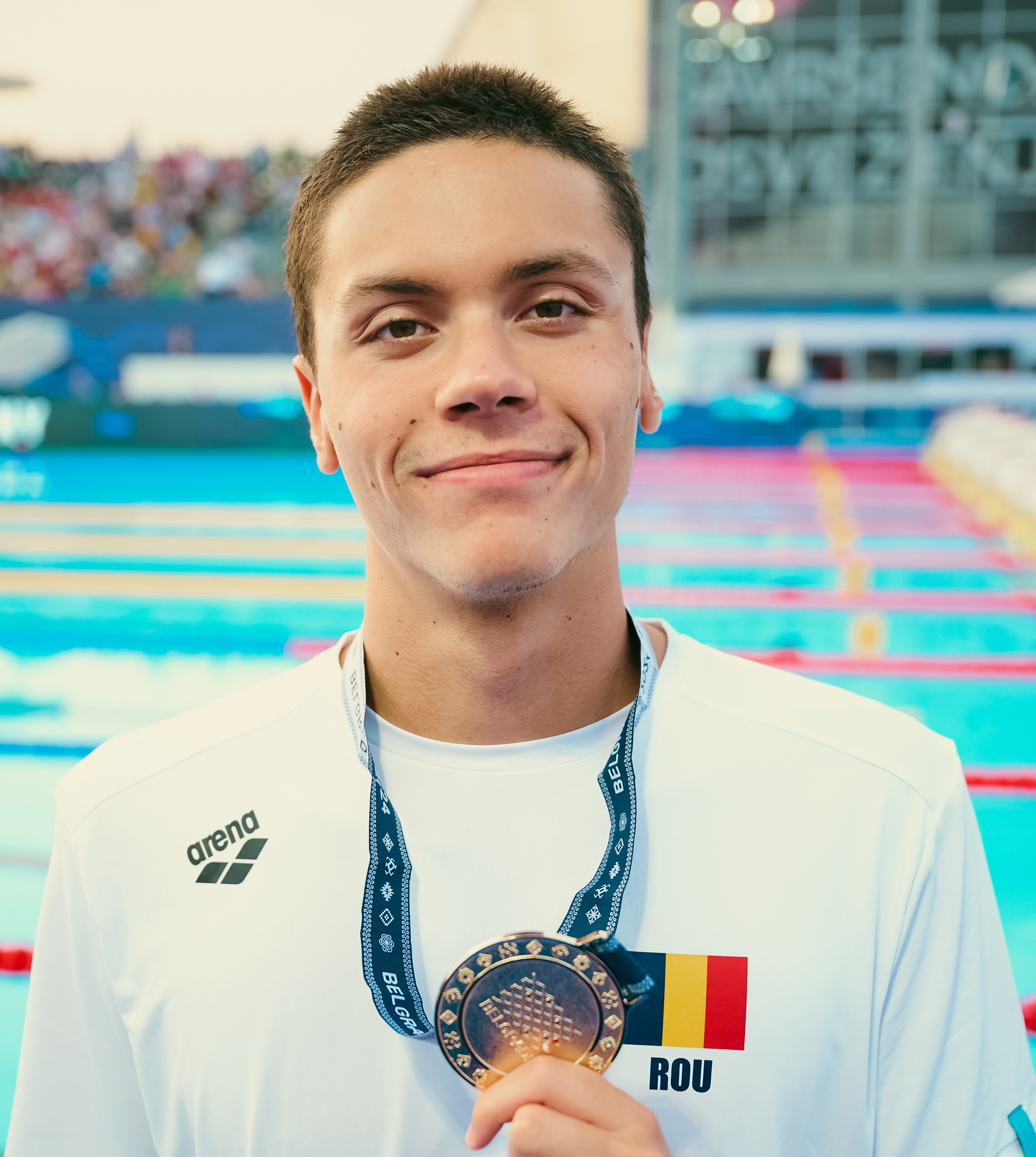
David Popovici won the Balkan Athlete of the Year in 2022.

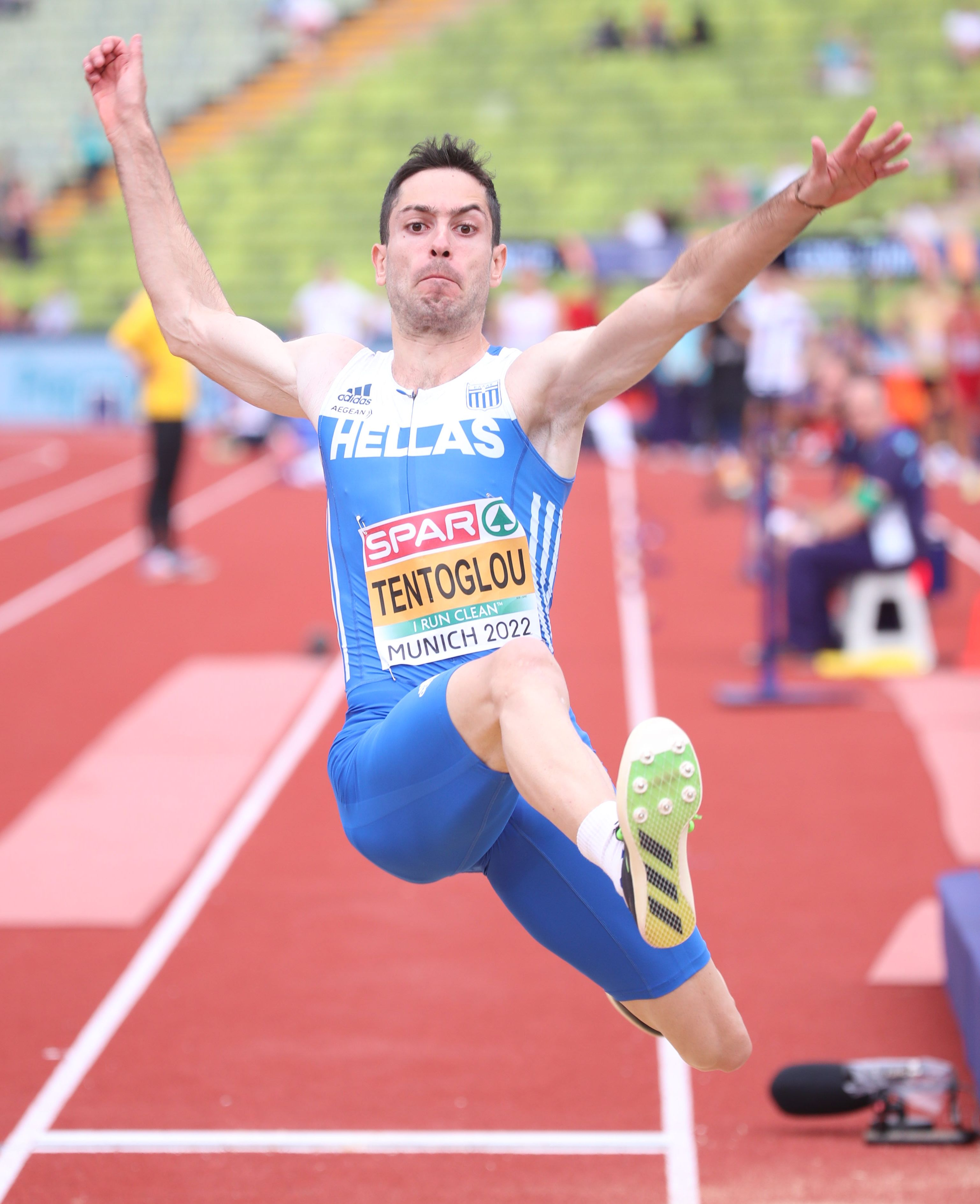
Miltos Tentoglou won the Balkan Athlete of the Year in 2024.

Year	Edition	Athlete	Sport	Awards, honors, and achievements in Year Won	Ref.
1973	1st Poll	(Bulgaria) Svetla Zlateva	athletics	1973 Bulgarian Athletics Championships 400 metres indoor: Gold; 1973 Bulgarian Athletics Championships 800 metres outdoor: Gold; 1973 Bulgarian Athletics Championships 1500 metres outdoor: Gold; 1973 Women's 800 metres World Record	
1974	2nd Poll	(Socialist Federal Republic of Yugoslavia) Mate Parlov	boxing	1974 World Boxing Championship Light Heavyweight Division: Gold; 1974 Balkans Boxing Championship Light Heavyweight Division: Gold; 1974 Yugoslavia Boxing Championship Light Heavyweight Division: Gold; 1974 DSL Sport's Best Athlete of Yugoslavia; 1974 Sportske novosti's Yugoslav Sportsman of the Year	
1975	3rd Poll	(Romania) Nadia Comăneci	artistic gymnastics	1975 Champions All Team: Gold; 1975 Champions All All Around: Gold; 1975 Pre-Olympics All Around: Gold; 1975 Pre-Olympics Vault: Silver; 1975 Pre-Olympics Uneven Bars: Gold; 1975 Pre-Olympics Balance Beam: Bronze; 1975 Pre-Olympics Floor Exercise: Silver; 1975 European Women's Artistic Gymnastics Championships All-Around: Gold; 1975 European Women's Artistic Gymnastics Championships Vault: Gold; 1975 European Women's Artistic Gymnastics Championships Uneven Bars: Gold; 1975 European Women's Artistic Gymnastics Championships Balance Beam: Gold; 1975 European Women's Artistic Gymnastics Championships Floor Exercise: Gold; 1975 Romania-Canada Dual Meet Team: Gold; 1975 Romania-Canada Dual Meet All Around: Gold; 1975 West Germany-Romania Dual Meet Team: Gold; 1975 West Germany-Romania Dual Meet All Around: Gold; 1975 Romania-Italy Dual Meet Team: Gold; 1975 Romania-Italy Dual Meet All Around: Gold; 1975 Romanian Gymnastics National Championships Team: Gold; 1975 Romanian Gymnastics National Championships All Around: Gold; 1975 Romanian Gymnastics National Championships Vault: Gold; 1975 Romanian Gymnastics National Championships Uneven Bars: Gold; 1975 Romanian Gymnastics National Championships Balance Beam: Gold; 1975 Romanian Gymnastics National Championships Floor Exercise: Silver; 1975 United Press International Athlete of the Year	
1976	4th Poll	(Romania) Nadia Comăneci (2×)	artistic gymnastics	1976 Summer Olympics Gymnastics – Women's artistic individual all-around: Gold; 1976 Summer Olympics Gymnastics – Women's uneven bars: Gold; 1976 Summer Olympics Gymnastics – Women's balance beam: Gold; 1976 Summer Olympics Gymnastics – Women's artistic team all-around: Silver; 1976 Summer Olympics Gymnastics – Women's floor: Bronze; 1976 American Cup All Around: Gold; 1976 Chunichi Cup All Around: Gold; 1976 Balkan Gymnastics Championship Team: Gold; 1976 Balkan Gymnastics Championship All Around: Gold; 1976 Balkan Gymnastics Championship Vault: Gold; 1976 Balkan Gymnastics Championship Uneven Bars: Gold; 1976 Balkan Gymnastics Championship Balance Beam: Gold; 1976 Balkan Gymnastics Championship Floor Exercise: Gold; 1976 USA-Romania Dual Meet Team: Gold; 1976 USA-Romania Dual Meet All Around: Gold; 1976 Canada-Romania Dual Meet Team: Gold; 1976 Canada-Romania All Around: Gold; 1976 Great Britain-Romania Dual Meet Team: Gold; 1976 Great Britain-Romania Dual Meet All Around: Gold; 1976 West Germany-Romania Dual Meet Team: Gold; 1976 West-Germany-Romania All Around: Gold; 1976 Netherlands-Romania Dual Meet Team: Gold; 1976 Netherlands-Romania Dual Meet All Around: Gold; 1976 Romanian Gymnastics National Championships All Around: Gold; 1976 Romanian Gymnastics National Championships Vault: Gold; 1976 Romanian Gymnastics National Championships Uneven Bars: Gold; 1976 Romanian Gymnastics National Championships Balance Beam: Gold; 1976 Romanian Gymnastics National Championships Floor Exercise: Silver; 1976 United Press International Athlete of the Year; 1976 Associated Press Athlete of the Year; 1976 BBC Overseas Sports Personality of the Year; 1976 Hero of Socialist Labour	
1977	5th Poll	(Bulgaria) Totka Petrova	athletics	1977 IAAF World Cup 800 metres: Gold; 1977 European Athletics Indoor Championships: 800 metres Silver; 1977 Summer Universiade Athletics 800 metres: Gold; 1977 Summer Universiade Athletics 1500 metres: Gold; 1977 Bulgarian Athletics Championships 800 metres Indoor: Gold; 1977 Bulgarian Athletics Championships 800 metres Outdoor: Gold; 1977 Bulgarian Athletics Championships 1500 metres Outdoor: Gold; 1977 Bulgarian Sportsperson of the Year	
1978	6th Poll	(Socialist Federal Republic of Yugoslavia) Miloš Srejović	athletics	1978 European Athletics Championships – Men's triple jump: Gold; 1978 Triple jump of 16.94 meters: Yugoslavia men's national record	
1979	7th Poll	(Bulgaria) Yanko Rusev	weightlifting	1979 World Weightlifting Championships 67.5 kg Weight Class Snatch: Gold; 1979 World Weightlifting Championships 67.5 kg Weight Class Clean and Jerk: Gold; 1979 World Weightlifting Championships 67.5 kg Weight Class Total: Gold; 1979 European Weightlifting Championships 67.5 kg Weight Class Snatch: Gold; 1979 European Weightlifting Championships 67.5 kg Weight Class Clean and Jerk: Gold; 1979 European Weightlifting Championships 67.5 kg Weight Class Total: Gold; 1979 Bulgarian Weightlifting Championships 67.5 kg Weight Class Clean and Jerk: Gold; 1979 Men's 67.5 kg Weight Class Snatch: 145 kg World Record; 1979 Men's 67.5 kg Weight Class Snatch: 146 kg World Record; 1979 Men's 67.5 kg Weight Class Clean and Jerk: 181.5 kg World Record; 1979 Men's 67.5 kg Weight Class Snatch: 147 kg World Record; 1979 Men's 67.5 kg Weight Class Clean and Jerk: 185.5 kg World Record; 1979 Men's 67.5 kg Weight Class Total: (2) 325 kg World Record; 1979 Men's 67.5 kg Weight Class Clean and Jerk: 187.5 kg World Record; 1979 Men's 67.5 kg Weight Class Total: (2) 332.5 kg World Record	
1980	8th Poll	(Romania) Nadia Comăneci (3×)	artistic gymnastics	1980 Summer Olympics Gymnastics – Women's artistic team all-around: Silver; 1980 Summer Olympics Gymnastics artistic individual all-around: Silver; 1980 Summer Olympics Gymnastics – Women's balance beam: Gold; 1980 Summer Olympics Gymnastics – Women's floor: Gold; 1980 Italy-Romania Dual Meet Team: Gold; 1980 Italy-Romania Dual Meet All Around: Gold; 1980 International Championship of Romania All Around: Gold; 1980 International Championship of Romania Uneven Bars: Gold	
1981	9th Poll	(Bulgaria) Antoaneta Todorova	athletics		
1982	10th Poll	(Bulgaria) Blagoy Blagoev	weightlifting	1982 Bulgarian Sportsperson of the Year	
1983	11th Poll	(Bulgaria) Diliana Georgieva	rhythmic gymnastics		
1984	12th Poll	(Bulgaria) Lyudmila Andonova	athletics	1984 Bulgarian Sportsperson of the Year	
1985	13th Poll	(Bulgaria) Stefka Kostadinova	athletics	1985 Bulgarian Sportsperson of the Year	
1986	14th Poll	(Bulgaria) Yordanka Donkova	athletics	1986 Bulgarian Sportsperson of the Year	
1987	15th Poll	(Bulgaria) Stefka Kostadinova (2×)	athletics	1987 Bulgarian Sportsperson of the Year	
1988	16th Poll	(Romania) Daniela Silivaș	artistic gymnastics		
1989	17th Poll	(Romania) Paula Ivan	athletics		
1990	18th Poll	(Socialist Federal Republic of Yugoslavia) Monica Seles	tennis	Yugoslav Sportswoman of the Year (1990)	
1991	19th Poll	(Socialist Federal Republic of Yugoslavia) Monica Seles (2×)	tennis		
1992	20th Poll	(Greece) Voula Patoulidou	athletics	1992 Greek Female Athlete of the Year	
1993	21st Poll	(Bulgaria) Ivan Ivanov	weightlifting		
1994	22nd Poll	(Bulgaria) Hristo Stoichkov	football	1994 Bulgarian Sportsperson of the Year	
1995	23rd Poll	(Bulgaria) Stefka Kostadinova (3×)	athletics	1995 Bulgarian Sportsperson of the Year	
1996	24th Poll	(Bulgaria) Stefka Kostadinova (4×)	athletics	1996 Bulgarian Sportsperson of the Year	
1997	25th Poll	(Bulgaria) Stefka Kostadinova (5×)	athletics		
1998	26th Poll	(Bulgaria) Ekaterina Dafovska	biathlon	1998 Bulgarian Sportsperson of the Year	
1999	27th Poll	(Romania) Gabriela Szabo	athletics		
2000	28th Poll	(Greece) Kostas Kenteris	athletics	2000 Greek Male Athlete of the Year	
2001	29th Poll	(Greece) Kostas Kenteris (2×)	athletics	2001 Greek Male Athlete of the Year	
2002	30th Poll	(Bulgaria) Georgi Markov	weightlifting		
2003	31st Poll	(Bulgaria) Yordan Yovchev	artistic gymnastics	2003 Bulgarian Sportsperson of the Year	
2004	32nd Poll	(Bulgaria) Maria Grozdeva	shooting	2004 Bulgarian Sportsperson of the Year	
2005	33rd Poll	(Romania) Marian Drăgulescu	artistic gymnastics		
2006	34th Poll	(Bulgaria) Vanya Stambolova	athletics		
2007	35th Poll	(Bulgaria) Rumyana Neykova	rowing		
2008	36th Poll	(Romania) Constantina Tomescu	athletics		
2009	37th Poll	(Greece) Vassilis Spanoulis	basketball		
2010	38th Poll	(Bulgaria) Stanka Zlateva	wrestling	2010 Bulgarian Sportsperson of the Year	
2011	39th Poll	(Serbia) Novak Djokovic	tennis	2011 Serbian Sportsman of the Year	
2012	40th Poll	(Serbia) Novak Djokovic (2×)	tennis		
2013	41st Poll	(Serbia) Novak Djokovic (3×)	tennis	2013 Serbian Sportsman of the Year	
2014	42nd Poll	(Serbia) Novak Djokovic (4×)	tennis	2014 Serbian Sportsman of the Year	
2015	43rd Poll	(Serbia) Novak Djokovic (5×)	tennis	2015 Serbian Sportsman of the Year	
2016	44th Poll	(Croatia) Sandra Perković	athletics	2016 Croatian Sportswoman of the Year	
2017	45th Poll	(Bulgaria) Grigor Dimitrov	tennis	2017 Bulgarian Sportsperson of the Year	
2018	46th Poll	(Croatia) Luka Modrić	football	2018 Croatian Sportsman of the Year	
2019	47th Poll	(Serbia) Novak Djokovic (6×)	tennis	2019 Serbian Sportsman of the Year	
2020	Cancelled because of the COVID-19 pandemic.				
2021	48th Poll	(Serbia) Novak Djokovic (7×)	tennis		
2022	49th Poll	(Romania) David Popovici	swimming		
2023	50th Poll	(Serbia) Novak Djokovic (8×)	tennis	2023 Serbian Sportsman of the Year	
2024	51st Poll	(Greece) Miltos Tentoglou	long jump	2024 Greek Male Athlete of the Year	
2025	52nd Poll	(Romania) David Popovici (2×)	swimming		
