= 1982 European Athletics Indoor Championships – Men's triple jump =

The men's triple jump event at the 1982 European Athletics Indoor Championships was held on 6 March.

== Results ==
Rank	Name	Nationality	Results	Notes
1st place, gold medalist(s)	Béla Bakosi	Hungary	17.13	
2nd place, silver medalist(s)	Gennadiy Valyukevich	Soviet Union	16.87	
3rd place, bronze medalist(s)	Nikolay Musiyenko	Soviet Union	16.82	
4	Aston Moore	Great Britain	16.74	
5	Dimitrios Mikhas	Greece	16.52	NR
6	Janoš Hegediš	Yugoslavia	16.42	
7	Vladimir Chernikov	Soviet Union	16.32	
8	Roberto Mazzucato	Italy	16.31	
9	Ramón Cid	Spain	16.15	
10	Klaus Kübler	West Germany	15.96	
11	Johan Brink	Sweden	15.03	
12	Armin Huber	West Germany	14.69	
