= Athletics at the 1977 Summer Universiade – Men's triple jump =

The men's triple jump event at the 1977 Summer Universiade was held at the Vasil Levski National Stadium in Sofia on 20 and 22 August.

== Medalists ==
| Gold | Silver | Bronze |
|---|---|---|
| Anatoliy Piskulin; Soviet Union | Ron Livers; United States | Willie Banks; United States |

== Results ==
=== Qualification ===
| Rank | Group | Athlete | Nationality | Result | Notes |
|---|---|---|---|---|---|
| 1 | ? | Ron Livers | United States | 16.52 | |
| 2 | ? | Aleksandr Yakovlev | Soviet Union | 16.43 | |
| 3 | ? | Roberto Mazzuccato | Italy | 16.38 | |
| 4 | ? | Willie Banks | United States | 16.26 | |
| 5 | ? | Juan Velásquez | Cuba | 16.18 | |
| 6 | ? | Junishi Usui | Japan | 16.15 | |
| 7 | ? | Paolo Piapan | Italy | 16.02 | |
| 8 | ? | Zou Zhenxian | China | 16.01 | |
| 9 | ? | Anatoliy Piskulin | Soviet Union | 15.96 | |
| 10 | ? | Janoš Hegediš | Yugoslavia | 15.89 | |
| 11 | ? | Adrian Ghioroaie | Romania | 15.88 | |
| 12 | ? | Andrzej Sontag | Poland | 15.83 | |
| 13 | ? | Mike Nipinak | Canada | 15.79 | |
| 14 | ? | Masami Nakanishi | Japan | 15.76 | |
| 15 | ? | Mikhail Mikhailov | Bulgaria | 15.54 | |
| 16 | ? | Georgi Georgiev | Bulgaria | 15.41 | |
| 17 | ? | Alberto Solanas | Spain | 15.40 | |
| 18 | ? | Bedros Bedrosian | Romania | 15.35 | |
| 19 | ? | Don Commons | Australia | 15.33 | |
| 20 | ? | John Okoro | Nigeria | 15.20 | |
| 21 | ? | Zdzisław Sobora | Poland | 15.18 | |
| 22 | ? | Thomas Thoma | Greece | 14.85 | |
| 23 | ? | Jim Wadda | Gambia | 14.26 | |
| | ? | H. Nkuria | Kenya | 13.72 | |

=== Final ===
| Rank | Athlete | Nationality | Result | Notes |
|---|---|---|---|---|
| 1st place, gold medalist(s) | Anatoliy Piskulin | Soviet Union | 17.30w | |
| 2nd place, silver medalist(s) | Ron Livers | United States | 16.96w | |
| 3rd place, bronze medalist(s) | Willie Banks | United States | 16.94 | |
| 4 | Juan Velásquez | Cuba | 16.90 | |
| 5 | Aleksandr Yakovlev | Soviet Union | 16.83 | |
| 6 | Zou Zhenxian | China | 16.45 | |
| 7 | Andrzej Sontag | Poland | 16.40 | |
| 8 | Janoš Hegediš | Yugoslavia | 16.34 | |
| 9 | Adrian Ghioroaie | Romania | 15.69 | |
| 10 | Paolo Piapan | Italy | 14.21 | |
| | Junishi Usui | Japan | NM | |
| | Roberto Mazzuccato | Italy | DNS | |
