= 1978 European Athletics Championships – Men's triple jump =

Men's triple jump at the European Athletics Championships

The men's triple jump at the 1978 European Athletics Championships was held in Prague, then Czechoslovakia, at Stadion Evžena Rošického on 3 September 1978.

== Medalists ==
Gold	Miloš Srejović; Yugoslavia
Silver	Viktor Sanejev; Soviet Union
Bronze	Anatoliy Piskulin; Soviet Union

== Results ==
=== Final ===
3 September

Rank	Name	Nationality	Result	Notes
1st place, gold medalist(s)	Miloš Srejović	Yugoslavia	16.94	
2nd place, silver medalist(s)	Viktor Sanejev	Soviet Union	16.93	
3rd place, bronze medalist(s)	Anatoliy Piskulin	Soviet Union	16.87	
4	Bernard Lamitié	France	16.87	
5	Gennadiy Valyukevich	Soviet Union	16.64	
6	Keith Connor	Great Britain	16.64	
7	Milan Spasojević	Yugoslavia	16.62	
8	Aston Moore	Great Britain	16.55	
9	Janoš Hegediš	Yugoslavia	16.24	
10	Eugeniusz Biskupski	Poland	16.23	
11	Lothar Gora	East Germany	16.20	
12	Gábor Katona	Hungary	16.18	
13	Karel Hradil	Czechoslovakia	16.05	
14	Carol Corbu	Romania	16.02	
15	Béla Bakosi	Hungary	15.74	

== Participation ==
According to an unofficial count, 15 athletes from 9 countries participated in the event.

- Czechoslovakia (1)
- East Germany (1)
- France (1)
- Hungary (2)
- Poland (1)
- Romania (1)
- Soviet Union (3)
- Great Britain (2)
- Yugoslavia (3)
