= 1981 European Athletics Indoor Championships – Men's triple jump =

The men's triple jump event at the 1981 European Athletics Indoor Championships was held on 21 February.

== Results ==
| Rank | Name | Nationality | #1 | #2 | #3 | #4 | #5 | #6 | Result | Notes |
|---|---|---|---|---|---|---|---|---|---|---|
| 1st place, gold medalist(s) | Shamil Abbyasov | Soviet Union | 16.81 | − | 17.30 | − | 15.01 | − | 17.30 | WR |
| 2nd place, silver medalist(s) | Klaus Kübler | West Germany | x | 16.72 | x | 16.73 | x | − | 16.73 | |
| 3rd place, bronze medalist(s) | Aston Moore | Great Britain | x | 16.73 | x | x | x | 16.65 | 16.73 | |
| 4 | Peter Bouschen | West Germany | 16.00 | x | 16.59 | 16.61 | x | 16.15 | 16.61 | |
| 5 | Bernard Lamitié | France | x | 16.48 | x | x | 16.25 | 16.50 | 16.50 | |
| 6 | Aleksandr Beskrovniy | Soviet Union | x | 16.24 | 15.99 | x | 15.87 | 16.46 | 16.46 | |
| 7 | Janoš Hegediš | Yugoslavia | 15.90 | 15.84 | 16.27 | 15.87 | 14.62 | 16.31 | 16.31 | |
| 8 | Wolfgang Knabe | West Germany | 16.14 | x | 15.78 | 16.01 | x | x | 16.14 | |
| 9 | Alessandro Ussi | Italy | x | 15.87 | 15.50 | | | | 15.87 | |
| 10 | Johan Brink | Sweden | x | 15.48 | 15.28 | | | | 15.48 | |
