= Athletics at the 1983 Summer Universiade – Men's triple jump =

The men's triple jump event at the 1983 Summer Universiade was held at the Commonwealth Stadium in Edmonton, Canada on 8 July 1983.

== Results ==
Rank	Athlete	Nationality	Result	Notes
1st place, gold medalist(s)	Ajayi Agbebaku	Nigeria	17.26	
2nd place, silver medalist(s)	Mike Conley	United States	17.20w	
3rd place, bronze medalist(s)	John Herbert	Great Britain	17.05	
4	Nikolay Musiyenko	Soviet Union	16.86	
5	Bedros Bedrosian	Romania	16.82	
6	Dan Simion	Romania	16.67	
7	Al Joyner	United States	16.39	
8	Mai Guoqiang	China	16.22	
9	Satoshi Kanamaru	Japan	15.79	
10	George Wright	Canada	14.79	
11	Fethi Querani	Tunisia	14.76	
	Aleksandr Beskrovniy	Soviet Union	NM	
	Klaus Kübler	West Germany	NM	
	Antonio Santos	Angola	NM	
