= 1977 European Athletics Indoor Championships – Men's triple jump =

The men's triple jump event at the 1977 European Athletics Indoor Championships was held on 12 March in San Sebastián.

== Results ==
Rank	Name	Nationality	#1	#2	#3	#4	#5	#6	Result	Notes
1st place, gold medalist(s)	Viktor Saneyev	Soviet Union	16.24	16.18	16.65	15.90	15.98	x	16.65	
2nd place, silver medalist(s)	Jaak Uudmäe	Soviet Union	16.14	x	16.46	x	15.97	15.86	16.46	
3rd place, bronze medalist(s)	Bernard Lamitié	France	15.63	16.23	16.45	x	16.05	x	16.45	
4	Zdzisław Sobora	Poland	x	16.23	16.24	x	x	16.30	16.30	
5	Janoš Hegediš	Yugoslavia	x	15.95	16.07	16.02	16.11	16.05	16.11	
6	Christian Valétudie	France	16.09	15.90	15.72	15.89	15.65	15.89	16.09	
7	Roberto Mazzucato	Italy	15.57	16.00	15.69	15.72	15.40	14.82	16.00	
8	Richard Kick	West Germany	15.86	x	15.82	15.55	15.60	15.64	15.86	
9	Ramón Cid	Spain	15.80	14.06	15.03				15.80	
	Wolfgang Kolmsee	West Germany	x	x	–				NM	
