= 1980 European Athletics Indoor Championships – Men's triple jump =

The men's triple jump event at the 1980 European Athletics Indoor Championships was held on 1 March in Sindelfingen.

== Results ==
Rank	Name	Nationality	#1	#2	#3	#4	#5	#6	Result	Notes
1st place, gold medalist(s)	Béla Bakosi	Hungary	16.13	16.35	16.86	16.32	x	x	16.86	
2nd place, silver medalist(s)	Jaak Uudmäe	Soviet Union	16.33	16.41	16.51	x	16.36	15.59	16.51	
3rd place, bronze medalist(s)	Gennadiy Kovtunov	Soviet Union	15.93	16.29	16.34	16.30	14.68	16.45	16.45	
4	Atanas Chochev	Bulgaria							16.40	
5	Milan Spasojević	Yugoslavia							16.38	
6	Klaus Kübler	West Germany							16.36	
7	Ramón Cid	Spain							16.36	
8	Olli Pousi	Finland							16.31	
9	Wolfgang Kolmsee	West Germany							16.16	
10	Miloš Srejović	Yugoslavia							16.13	
11	Christian Valétudie	France							16.06	
12	Zdzisław Hoffmann	Poland							16.03	
13	Aleksandr Lisichonok	Soviet Union							15.91	
14	Bedros Bedrosian	Romania							15.74	
15	Antonio Corgos	Spain							15.46	
