= Yugoslavia at the 1978 European Athletics Championships =

- WA code: YUG

in Prague
- Competitors: 14
- Medals: Gold 1 Silver 1 Bronze 0 Total 2

European Athletics Championships appearances
- 1934; 1938; 1946; 1950; 1954; 1958; 1962; 1966; 1969; 1971; 1974; 1978; 1982; 1986; 1990; 1994; 1998; 2002

Yugoslavia sent 14 athletes to the 1978 European Athletics Championships which took place 29 August–3 September 1978 in Prague. Yugoslavia won two medals at the Championships.

== Medalists ==
Medal	Name	Event
1st place, gold medalist(s)	Miloš Srejović	Men's triple jump
2nd place, silver medalist(s)	Nenad Stekić	Men's long jump
