= Athletics at the 1981 Summer Universiade – Men's triple jump =

The men's triple jump event at the 1981 Summer Universiade was held at the Stadionul Naţional in Bucharest on 21 and 22 July 1981.

== Medalists ==
| Gold | Silver | Bronze |
|---|---|---|
| Zou Zhenxian; China | Béla Bakosi; Hungary | Keith Connor; Great Britain |

== Results ==
=== Qualification ===
Qualifying mark: 16.00 m

| Rank | Athlete | Nationality | Result | Notes |
|---|---|---|---|---|
| 1 | Adrian Ghioroaie | Romania | 16.43 | Q |
| 2 | Willie Banks | United States | 16.38 | Q |
| 3 | Aleksandr Beskrovniy | Soviet Union | 16.36 | Q |
| 4 | Zou Zhenxian | China | 16.17 | Q |
| 5 | Robert Cannon | United States | 16.15 | Q |
| 6 | Bedros Bedrosian | Romania | 16.05 | Q |
| 7 | Keith Connor | Great Britain | 16.03 | |
| 8 | Béla Bakosi | Hungary | 16.02 | |
| 9 | Masami Nakanishi | Japan | 16.00 | |
| 10 | Joshua Kio | Nigeria | 15.85 | |
| 11 | Li Menghchun | China | 15.74 | |
| 12 | Vladimir Chernikov | Soviet Union | 15.69 | |
| 13 | Ramón Cid | Spain | 15.66 | |
| 14 | Ioannis Afthinos | Greece | 15.08 | |
| 15 | Alessandro Ussi | Italy | 14.98 | |
| 16 | Saïd Saad | Algeria | 14.73 | |
| 17 | Mirihij Mahdi | Iraq | 14.43 | |

=== Final ===
| Rank | Athlete | Nationality | Result | Notes |
|---|---|---|---|---|
| 1st place, gold medalist(s) | Zou Zhenxian | China | 17.32 | UR, AR |
| 2nd place, silver medalist(s) | Béla Bakosi | Hungary | 16.97 | |
| 3rd place, bronze medalist(s) | Keith Connor | Great Britain | 16.88 | |
| 4 | Aleksandr Beskrovniy | Soviet Union | 16.87 | |
| 5 | Robert Cannon | United States | 16.55 | |
| 6 | Adrian Ghioroaie | Romania | 16.55 | |
| 7 | Vladimir Chernikov | Soviet Union | 16.53 | |
| 8 | Bedros Bedrosian | Romania | 16.36 | |
| 9 | Masami Nakanishi | Japan | 16.11 | |
| 10 | Li Menghchun | China | 15.99 | |
| | Willie Banks | United States | DNS | |
| | Joshua Kio | Nigeria | DNS | |
