= Athletics at the 1979 Summer Universiade – Men's 800 metres =

The men's 800 metres event at the 1979 Summer Universiade was held at the Estadio Olimpico Universitario in Mexico City on 11, 12 and 13 September 1979.

== Medalists ==
Gold	Silver	Bronze
Evans White; United States	Garry Cook; Great Britain	Hans-Peter Ferner; West Germany

== Results ==
=== Heats ===
Rank	Heat	Athlete	Nationality	Time	Notes
1	3	Evans White	United States	1:51.36	Q
2	4	Agberto Guimarães	Brazil	1:51.82	Q
3	4	Thomas Wilking	West Germany	1:52.03	Q
4	3	Abderrahmane Morceli	Algeria	1:52.44	Q
5	1	Robert Nemeth	Austria	1:52.63	Q
5	2	Roger Milhau	France	1:52.63	Q
7	1	Binko Kolev	Bulgaria	1:52.74	Q
8	1	Philippe Dupont	France	1:52.75	q
9	4	Garry Cook	Great Britain	1:52.87	q
10	2	Hans-Peter Ferner	West Germany	1:52.91	Q
11	2	Chum Darvall	Australia	1:53.17	q
12	3	Charles Borromeo	India	1:53.20	q
13	1	Víctor Ibáñez	Mexico	1:53.40	q
14	5	Adomo Corradini	Italy	1:53.41	Q
15	3	David Belyon	Kenya	1:53.60	q
16	4	Ángel Gil	Mexico	1:53.70	
17	5	Scott Clark	United States	1:53.82	Q
18	1	Khaled Hussein	Kuwait	1:54.03	
19	5	Roger Soler	Peru	1:54.32	
20	1	Leonard Smith	Jamaica	1:55.00	
21	5	John Bowden	New Zealand	1:55.02	
22	1	Jeptham Karingo	Kenya	1:55.74	
23	5	Jorge Camacho	Costa Rica	1:56.85	
24	4	Kossivi Attikpo	Togo	1:57.32	
25	3	Yabaty Agbéré	Togo	1:57.74	
26	5	Abdallah Mohammed	Saudi Arabia	2:00.13	
27	4	Miguel Banegas	Honduras	2:00.92	
28	3	Raúl Campos	Peru	2:02.41	
29	5	John Erysthee	Saint Lucia	2:03.30	
30	2	Orlando Ruano	Guatemala	2:05.10	
31	4	Mohamed Khalil	Saudi Arabia	2:05.70	
32	3	Jean-Louis Pellegrin	Mauritius	2:06.42	
33	5	Francisco King	Guatemala	2:07.88	
34	2	Edwin Attard	Malta	2:10.16	
35	1	Theodore Muziwakh Khumalo	Swaziland	2:17.21	

=== Semifinals ===
Rank	Heat	Athlete	Nationality	Time	Notes
1	1	Evans White	United States	1:50.02	Q
2	1	Roger Milhau	France	1:50.08	Q
3	1	Garry Cook	Great Britain	1:50.37	Q
4	1	Thomas Wilking	West Germany	1:50.75	Q
5	1	Robert Nemeth	Austria	1:50.94	
6	2	Agberto Guimarães	Brazil	1:51.31	Q
7	2	Abderrahmane Morceli	Algeria	1:51.36	Q
8	2	Philippe Dupont	France	1:51.76	Q
9	2	Hans-Peter Ferner	West Germany	1:51.78	Q
10	2	Binko Kolev	Bulgaria	1:51.80	
11	1	Charles Borromeo	India	1:51.92	
12	1	David Belyon	Kenya	1:51.92	
13	2	Chum Darvall	Australia	1:51.99	
14	2	Scott Clark	United States	1:52.12	
15	1	Víctor Ibáñez	Mexico	1:52.54	
	2	Adomo Corradini	Italy	?	

=== Final ===
Rank	Athlete	Nationality	Time	Notes
1st place, gold medalist(s)	Evans White	United States	1:48.87	
2nd place, silver medalist(s)	Garry Cook	Great Britain	1:49.50	
3rd place, bronze medalist(s)	Hans-Peter Ferner	West Germany	1:49.77	
4	Abderrahmane Morceli	Algeria	1:49.89	
5	Philippe Dupont	France	1:51.84	
6	Thomas Wilking	West Germany	1:54.45	
	Roger Milhau	France	DNF	
	Agberto Guimarães	Brazil	DNF	
