= 1981 European Athletics Indoor Championships – Men's 800 metres =

The men's 800 metres event at the 1981 European Athletics Indoor Championships was held on 21 and 22 February.

== Medalists ==
Gold	Silver	Bronze
Herbert Wursthorn; West Germany	Andras Paróczai; Hungary	Antonio Páez; Spain

== Results ==
=== Heats ===
First 2 from each heat (Q) and the next 2 fastest (q) qualified for the semifinals.

Rank	Heat	Name	Nationality	Time	Notes
1	2	András Paróczai	Hungary	1:47.93	Q
2	1	Herbert Wursthorn	West Germany	1:48.58	Q
3	2	Thomas Wilking	West Germany	1:48.60	Q
4	2	Detlef Wagenknecht	East Germany	1:48.69	q
5	1	Antonio Páez	Spain	1:49.18	Q
6	1	Andreas Busse	East Germany	1:49.45	q
7	2	Mike Whittingham	Great Britain	1:49.51	
8	2	Rui Fernandes	Portugal	1:49.81	
9	1	József Bereczki	Hungary	1:49.98	
10	1	Binko Kolev	Bulgaria	1:51.55	
	2	Andrés Ballbé	Spain	DNF	
	1	Hans-Peter Ferner	West Germany	DNS	

=== Final ===
Rank	Name	Nationality	Time	Notes
1st place, gold medalist(s)	Herbert Wursthorn	West Germany	1:47.70	
2nd place, silver medalist(s)	András Paróczai	Hungary	1:47.73	
3rd place, bronze medalist(s)	Antonio Páez	Spain	1:48.31	
4	Andreas Busse	East Germany	1:48.82	
5	Detlef Wagenknecht	East Germany	1:48.87	
6	Thomas Wilking	West Germany	1:49.49	
