= Athletics at the 1982 Commonwealth Games – Men's triple jump =

Men's triple jump at the Commonwealth Games

The men's triple jump event at the 1982 Commonwealth Games was held on 9 October at the QE II Stadium in Brisbane, Australia.

== Results ==
Rank	Name	Nationality	#1	#2	#3	#4	#5	#6	Result	Notes
1st place, gold medalist(s)	Keith Connor	England		17.72w		17.81w			17.81w	
2nd place, silver medalist(s)	Ken Lorraway	Australia		17.42w		17.54w			17.54w	
3rd place, bronze medalist(s)	Aston Moore	England	16.76w						16.76w	
4	Stephen Hanna	Bahamas							16.56	
5	John Herbert	England							16.48	
6	Norbet Elliot	Bahamas							16.36	
7	Marios Hadjiandreou	Cyprus							16.31	
8	Moses Kiayi	Kenya							14.91	
	Gary Honey	Australia							DNS	
	Delroy Poyser	Jamaica							DNS	
