= 1980 European Athletics Indoor Championships – Men's 800 metres =

The men's 800 metres event at the 1980 European Athletics Indoor Championships was held on 1 and 2 March in Sindelfingen.

== Medalists ==
Gold	Silver	Bronze
Nikolay Chernyetskiy; France	András Paróczai; Hungary	Herbert Wursthorn; West Germany

== Results ==
=== Heats ===
First 2 from each heat (Q) and the next 2 fastest (q) qualified for the final.

Rank	Heat	Name	Nationality	Time	Notes
1	1	András Paróczai	Hungary	1:49.7	Q
2	1	Roger Milhau	France	1:49.9	Q
3	1	Herbert Wursthorn	West Germany	1:50.0	q
4	1	Koen Gijsbers	Netherlands	1:50.2	q
5	2	Colomán Trabado	Spain	1:50.4	Q
6	2	Klaus-Peter Nabein	West Germany	1:50.7	Q
7	1	Jiří Dlouhý	Czechoslovakia	1:50.8	
7	2	Binko Kolev	Bulgaria	1:50.8	
9	2	Pavel Jehlička	Czechoslovakia	1:51.1	
10	2	Sermet Timurlenk	Turkey	1:51.9	

=== Final ===
Rank	Name	Nationality	Time	Notes
1st place, gold medalist(s)	Roger Milhau	France	1:50.2	
2nd place, silver medalist(s)	András Paróczai	Hungary	1:50.3	
3rd place, bronze medalist(s)	Herbert Wursthorn	West Germany	1:50.4	
4	Klaus-Peter Nabein	West Germany	1:51.4	
5	Koen Gijsbers	Netherlands	1:51.6	
	Colomán Trabado	Spain	DQ	
