= Alejandro Herrera =

Alejandro Herrera may refer to:

- Alejandro Herrera (Heroes)
- Alejandro Herrera (athlete) (born 1958), Cuban athlete
