= 1982 European Athletics Championships – Men's triple jump =

Men's triple jump at the European Athletics Championships

The final of the Men's Triple Jump event at the 1982 European Championships in Athens, Greece was held on 10 September 1982.

== Medalists ==
Gold	(United Kingdom) Keith Connor; Great Britain (GBR)
Silver	Vasiliy Grishchenkov; Soviet Union (URS)
Bronze	Béla Bakosi; Hungary (HUN)

== Abbreviations ==
- All results shown are in metres

Q	automatic qualification
q	qualification by rank
DNS	did not start
NM	no mark
WR	world record
AR	area record
NR	national record
PB	personal best
SB	season best

== Records ==
Standing records prior to the 1982 European Athletics Championships
World Record	João Carlos de Oliveira (BRA)	17.89 m	October 15, 1975	Mexico City, Mexico
Event Record	Viktor Saneyev (URS)	17.23 m	September 8, 1974	Rome, Italy
Broken records during the 1982 European Athletics Championships
Event Record	Keith Connor (GBR)	17.29 m	September 10, 1982	Athens, Greece

== Final ==
Rank	Athlete	Attempts						Result	Note
Rank	Athlete	1	2	3	4	5	6	Result	Note
1st place, gold medalist(s)	Keith Connor (GBR)							17.29 m (w: -0.1 m/s)	CR
2nd place, silver medalist(s)	Vasiliy Grishchenkov (URS)							17.15 m (w: 0.2 m/s)	
3rd place, bronze medalist(s)	Béla Bakosi (HUN)							17.04 m (w: 0.2 m/s)	
4	Gennadiy Valyukevich (URS)							16.95 m (w: -0.3 m/s)	
5	Aleksandr Beskrovny (URS)							16.82 m (w: -1.2 m/s)	
6	Bedros Bedrosian (ROU)							16.46 m (w: 0.3 m/s)	
7	Markku Rokala (FIN)							16.32 m (w: -1.9 m/s)	
8	Roberto Mazzucato (ITA)							16.13 m (w: -0.2 m/s)	
9	Dario Badinelli (ITA)							16.05 m (w: -0.6 m/s)	
10	Janoš Hegediš (YUG)							16.03 m (w: -0.3 m/s)	
11	Johan Brink (SWE)							15.95 m (w: -0.5 m/s)	
12	John Herbert (GBR)							15.92 m (w: -0.7 m/s)	
	Dimitrios Mihas (GRE)							DNS	

== Participation ==
According to an unofficial count, 12 athletes from 8 countries participated in the event.

- Finland (1)
- Hungary (1)
- Italy (2)
- Romania (1)
- Soviet Union (3)
- Sweden (1)
- United Kingdom (2)
- Yugoslavia (1)

== See also ==
- 1980 Men's Olympic Triple Jump (Moscow)
- 1983 Men's World Championships Triple Jump (Helsinki)
- 1984 Men's Olympic Triple Jump (Los Angeles)
