= 1978 European Athletics Indoor Championships – Men's triple jump =

The men's triple jump event at the 1978 European Athletics Indoor Championships was held on 12 March in Milan.

== Results ==
Rank	Name	Nationality	#1	#2	#3	#4	#5	#6	Result	Notes
1st place, gold medalist(s)	Anatoliy Piskulin	Soviet Union	16.16	15.58	16.82	16.22	16.34	16.64	16.82	
2nd place, silver medalist(s)	Keith Connor	Great Britain							16.53	
3rd place, bronze medalist(s)	Aleksandr Yakovlev	Soviet Union							16.47	
4	Carol Corbu	Romania							16.41	
5	Paolo Piapan	Italy							16.25	
6	Ramón Cid	Spain							16.20	
7	David Johnson	Great Britain							16.13	
8	Janoš Hegediš	Yugoslavia							16.12	
9	Eugeniusz Biskupski	Poland							16.06	
10	Pentti Kuukasjärvi	Finland							15.80	
11	Gennadiy Kovtunov	Soviet Union							15.76	
12	Georgios Kaperonis	Greece							15.73	
13	Temel Erbek	Turkey							15.20	
