= Srejović =

Srejović (Serbian Cyrillic: Срејовић) is a Serbian surname. Notable people with the surname include:

- Dragoslav Srejović (1931–1996), Serbian archaeologist and anthropologist
- Miloš Srejović (born 1956), Serbian triple jumper
