= Abdoulaye Samba Diallo =

Senegalese triple jumper

Personal information
- Nationality: Senegalese
- Born: 1946 (age 79–80)

Sport
- Sport: Athletics
- Event: Triple jump

Abdoulaye Samba Diallo (born 1946) is a Senegalese athlete. He competed in the men's triple jump at the 1980 Summer Olympics.
