= 1982 European Athletics Indoor Championships – Men's 800 metres =

The men's 800 metres event at the 1982 European Athletics Indoor Championships was held on 6–7 March.

== Medalists ==
Gold	Silver	Bronze
Antonio Páez; Spain	Klaus-Peter Nabein; West Germany	Colomán Trabado; Spain

== Results ==
=== Heats ===
First 2 of each heat (Q) and the next 6 fastest (q) qualified for the semifinals.

Rank	Heat	Name	Nationality	Time	Notes
1	3	Colomán Trabado	Spain	1:48.78	Q
2	3	Hans-Joachim Mogalle	East Germany	1:48.82	Q
3	3	Bruno Tabourin	France	1:48.92	q
4	3	Hans-Peter Ferner	West Germany	1:48.98	q
5	3	Milovan Savić	Yugoslavia	1:49.04	q
6	2	Klaus-Peter Nabein	West Germany	1:49.99	Q
7	2	Antonio Páez	Spain	1:49.99	Q
8	2	Arno Korneling	Netherlands	1:50.01	q
9	2	Michel Wijnsberghe	Belgium	1:50.61	q
10	1	József Bereczki	Hungary	1:50.81	Q
11	1	Thomas Wilking	West Germany	1:50.93	Q
12	2	Didier Le Guillou	France	1:50.95	q
13	1	Roger Milhau	France	1:51.00	
14	2	Sermet Timurlenk	Turkey	1:51.72	
15	1	Adorno Corradini	Italy	1:51.85	
15	1	Jürg Gerber	Switzerland	1:51.91	

=== Semifinals ===
First 3 from each semifinal qualified directly (Q) for the final.

Rank	Heat	Name	Nationality	Time	Notes
1	1	Colomán Trabado	Spain	1:48.31	Q
2	1	Hans-Peter Ferner	West Germany	1:48.50	Q
3	2	Antonio Páez	Spain	1:48.69	Q
4	1	Klaus-Peter Nabein	West Germany	1:48.73	Q
5	1	Didier Le Guillou	France	1:48.75	
6	2	Arno Korneling	Netherlands	1:48.92	Q
7	1	Milovan Savić	Yugoslavia	1:49.38	
8	2	Hans-Joachim Mogalle	East Germany	1:49.68	Q
9	2	Bruno Tabourin	France	1:49.95	
10	2	József Bereczki	Hungary	1:49.96	
11	2	Thomas Wilking	West Germany	1:50.52	
	1	Michel Wijnsberghe	Belgium	DNF	

=== Final ===
Rank	Name	Nationality	Time	Notes
1st place, gold medalist(s)	Antonio Páez	Spain	1:48.02	
2nd place, silver medalist(s)	Klaus-Peter Nabein	West Germany	1:48.31	
3rd place, bronze medalist(s)	Colomán Trabado	Spain	1:48.35	
4	Arno Korneling	Netherlands	1:48.46	
5	Hans-Joachim Mogalle	East Germany	1:49.64	
6	Hans-Peter Ferner	West Germany	1:50.62	
