= Ramón Cid =

Spanish triple jumper (born 1954)

Personal information
- Born: 15 August 1954 (age 71) San Sebastián, Spain

Sport
- Sport: Track and field
Medal record
Representing Spain
European Junior Championships
Silver medal – second place	1973 Duisburg	Triple jump

Ramón Cid Pardo (born 15 August 1954) is a retired Spanish triple jumper. His personal best jump was 16.69 metres, achieved in October 1980 in Madrid. He competed in the men's triple jump at the 1976 Summer Olympics and the 1980 Summer Olympics.

== International competitions ==
Year	Competition	Venue	Position	Notes
Representing Spain
1973	European Junior Championships	Duisburg, West Germany	2nd	16.06 m
1975	Mediterranean Games	Algiers, Algeria	4th	15.62 m
1976	Olympic Games	Montreal, Canada	18th (q)	16.00 m
1977	European Indoor Championships	San Sebastián, Spain	9th	15.80 m
1978	European Indoor Championships	Milan, Italy	6th	16.20 m
1979	European Indoor Championships	Vienna, Austria	6th	16.16 m
1979	Universiade	Mexico City, Mexico	4th	16.71 m
1980	European Indoor Championships	Sindelfingen, West Germany	7th	16.36 m
1980	Olympic Games	Moscow, Soviet Union	13th (q)	16.20 m
1981	Universiade	Bucharest, Romania	13th (q)	15.66 m
1982	European Indoor Championships	Milan, Italy	9th	16.15 m
