= Arthure Agathine =

Seychellois athlete

Personal information
- Nationality: Seychellois
- Born: 17 December 1960
- Died: 24 October 2016 (aged 55)

Sport
- Sport: Athletics
- Event: Triple jump

Arthure Agathine (17 December 1960 – 24 October 2016) was a Seychellois athlete. He competed in the men's triple jump at the 1980 Summer Olympics. He was a three-time national champion in the triple jump between 1981 and 1983.

He later worked as an athletics coach. He died in 2016 after a short illness.
