= Dương Đức Thủy =

Vietnamese triple jumper (born 1961)

Personal information
- Nationality: Vietnamese
- Born: 14 April 1961 (age 65)

Sport
- Sport: Athletics
- Events: Long jump, triple jump

Dương Đức Thủy (born 14 April 1961) is a Vietnamese former athlete and coach.

== Career ==
He is the first Vietnamese athlete to jump over seven metres in long jump and over 15 metres in triple jump.

He competed in the men's triple jump at the 1980 Summer Olympics.

Dương Đức Thủy is the former holder of national triple jump and long jump records, having hold the records for 15 and 10 years from 1984 and 1985, respectively. He is also the former head coach of the Vietnamese national athletics team, having coached the team for 16 years.

== Academic ==
In 1998, he successfully defended his doctoral thesis on athletics coaching.
