= Vasiliy Grishchenkov =

Soviet triple jumper

Personal information
- Born: 23 January 1958 (age 68)
Medal record
Men's athletics
Representing Soviet Union
European Championships
Silver medal – second place	1982 Athens	Triple jump

Vasily Grishchenkov (Russian: Василий Грищенков) born 23 January 1958) is a retired triple jumper from the Soviet Union, best known for winning the silver medal at the 1982 European Championships in Athens, Greece. He set the world's best year performance in 1983 with a leap of 17.55 metres (personal best), achieved on 19 June 1983 in Moscow.
