= Thomas Wilking =

German middle-distance runner

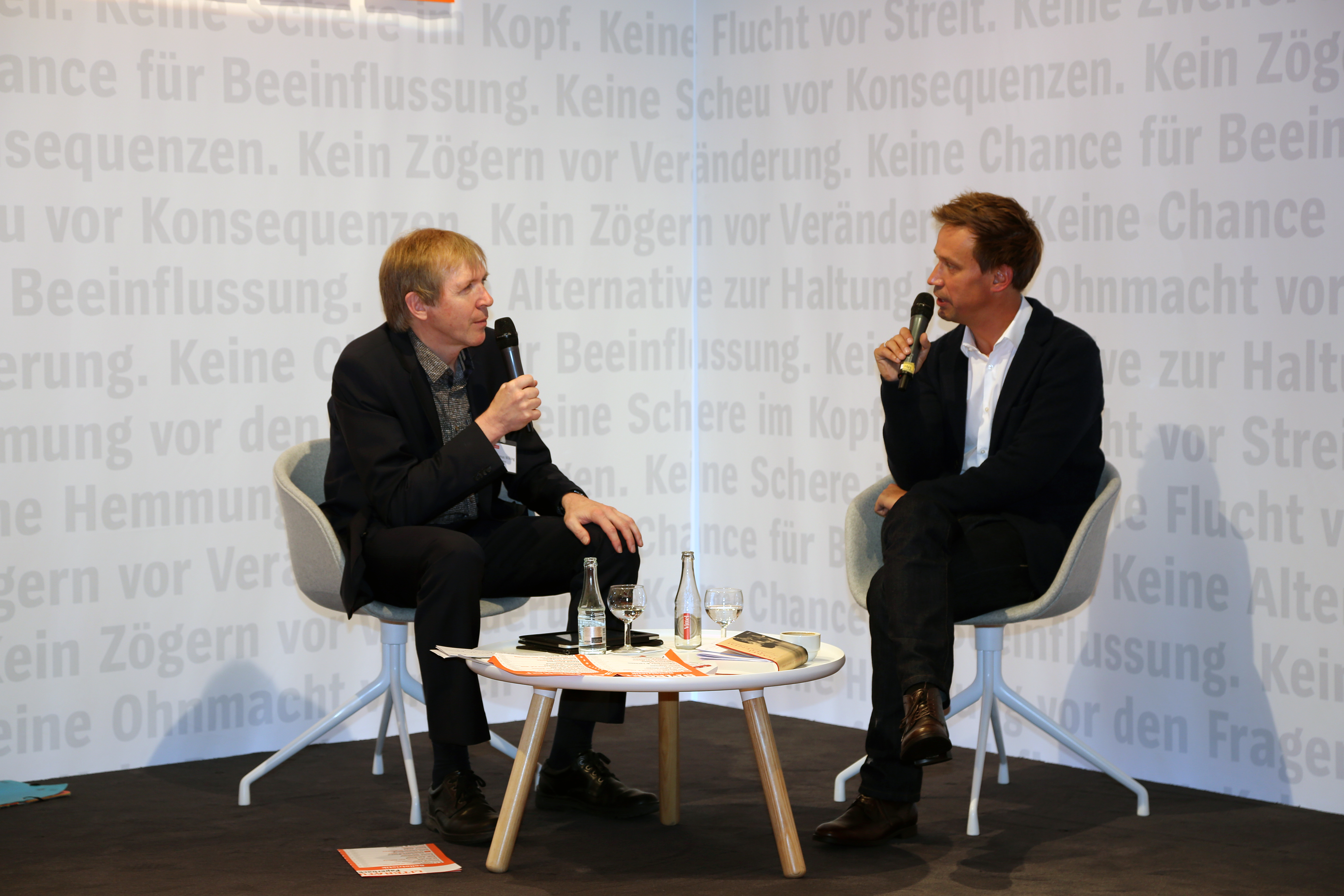
- Thomas Wilking (left) at the Frankfurt Book Fair, 2015.

Personal information
- Born: 2 January 1956 (age 70) Dortmund, West Germany

Sport
- Sport: Track and field

Thomas Wilking (born 2 January 1956) is a West German retired middle-distance runner who specialized in the 800 metres. He later became a writer and editor-in-chief.

He finished sixth at the 1979 Summer Universiade, and sixth at the 1981 European Indoor Championships. He also competed at the 1982 and 1985 European Indoor Championships without reaching the final.

At the West German championships, Wilking competed during the long reign of Willi Wülbeck who won every national title from 1974 to 1983. Wilking managed to clinch a silver medal behind Wülbeck in 1979 as well as bronze medals in 1980 and 1981. At the West German indoor championships, however, Wilking won gold medals in 1980 and 1983, a silver in 1981 and bronze in 1978, 1982 and 1984. He represented the club OSC Dortmund, except for 1984 when he had joined VfL Kamen.

His personal best time was 1:46.76 minutes, achieved in June 1980 in Warsaw.

He delivered the thesis Strukturen lokaler Nachrichten. Eine empirische Untersuchung von Text- und Bildberichterstattung, printed by K.G. Saur in 1990. In 2006, Wilking became editor-in-chief of the trade magazine Buchreport, covering Germany's literary scene. The trade magazine ceased publication on New Year of 2024 due to the December 2023 bankruptcy of its owner, the publishing house Harenberg Verlag.
