= Yevgeniy Anikin =

Soviet athlete

Personal information
- Nationality: Soviet
- Born: 13 March 1958 Lukino, Russian SSR, USSR
- Died: 20 March 2023 (aged 65)

Sport
- Sport: Athletics
- {{{event_type}}}: Triple jump

Yevgeniy Anikin (Russian: Евгений Аникин; 13 March 1958 – 20 March 2023) was a Soviet athlete. He competed in the men's triple jump at the 1980 Summer Olympics.
