= 1979 European Athletics Indoor Championships – Men's 800 metres =

The men's 800 metres event at the 1979 European Athletics Indoor Championships was held on 24 and 25 February in Vienna.

== Medalists ==
Gold	Silver	Bronze
Antonio Páez; Spain	Binko Kolev; Bulgaria	András Paróczai; Hungary

== Results ==
=== Heats ===
First 2 from each heat (Q) and the next 2 fastest (q) qualified for the final.

Rank	Heat	Name	Nationality	Time	Notes
1	1	Antonio Páez	Spain	1:47.7	Q
2	1	Milovan Savić	Yugoslavia	1:48.9	Q, SB
3	2	András Paróczai	Hungary	1:49.3	Q
4	2	Carlo Grippo	Italy	1:49.4	Q
5	2	Binko Kolev	Bulgaria	1:49.4	q
6	2	Rolf Gysin	Switzerland	1:49.6	q
7	2	Didier Marquant	France	1:49.7	PB
8	1	Nikolay Kirov	Soviet Union	1:50.1	PB
8	2	Sermet Timurlenk	Turkey	1:50.1	PB
10	1	Carlos Cabral	Portugal	1:51.0	PB
11	1	Adorno Corradini	Italy	1:51.3	PB
12	1	Manfred Archer	Austria	1:51.8	PB
13	2	Koen Gijsbers	Netherlands	1:51.9	SB

=== Final ===
Rank	Name	Nationality	Time	Notes
1st place, gold medalist(s)	Antonio Páez	Spain	1:47.4	PB
2nd place, silver medalist(s)	Binko Kolev	Bulgaria	1:47.8	NR
3rd place, bronze medalist(s)	András Paróczai	Hungary	1:48.2	SB
4	Carlo Grippo	Italy	1:49.1	SB
5	Milovan Savić	Yugoslavia	1:49.1	
6	Rolf Gysin	Switzerland	1:49.5	SB
