= Jaak Uudmäe =

Estonian athlete (born 1954)

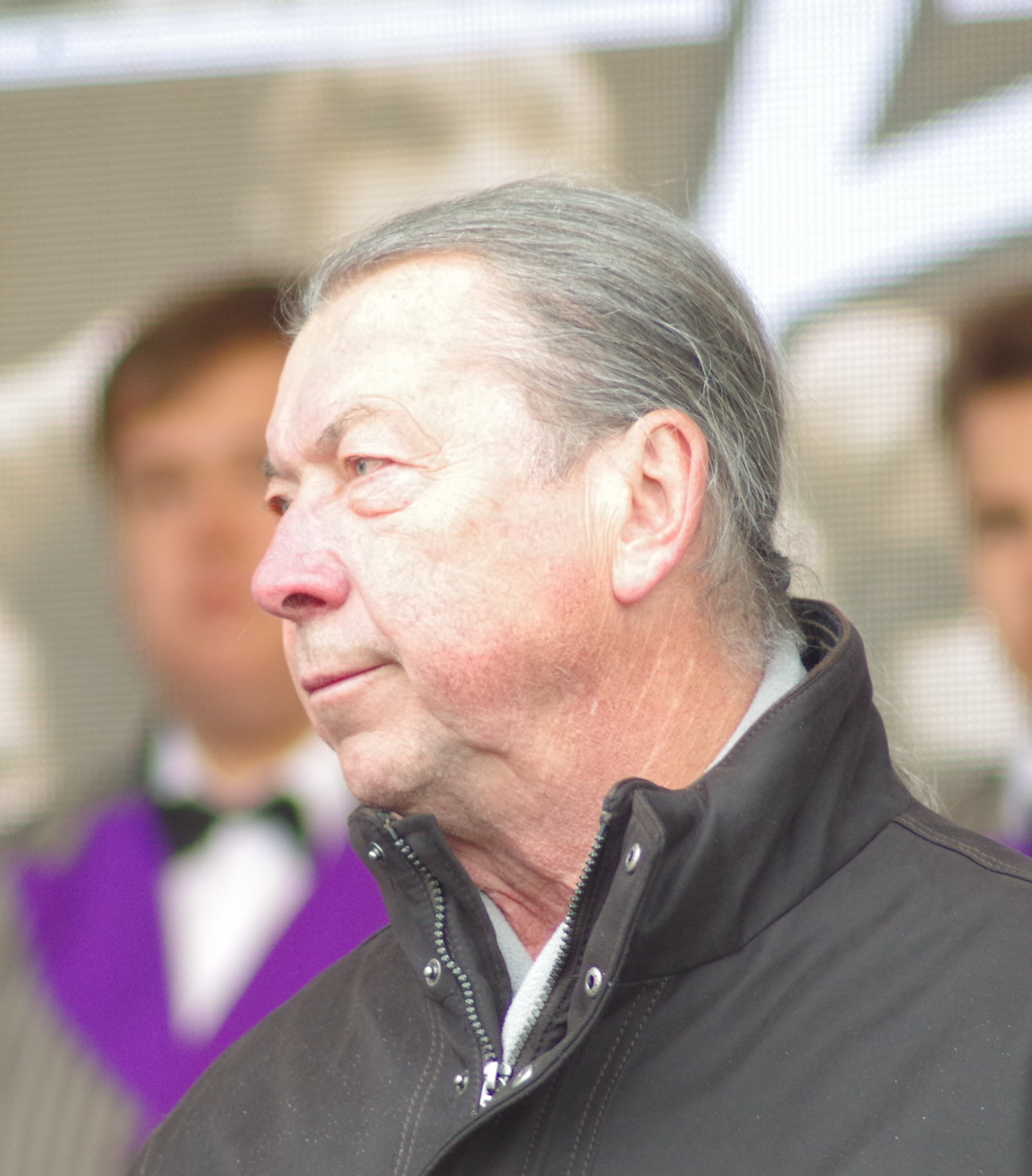
- Jaak Uudmäe in 2018

Personal information
- Born: 3 September 1954 (age 72) Tallinn, then part of Estonian SSR, Soviet Union
Medal record
Men's athletics
Representing Soviet Union
Olympic Games
Gold medal – first place	1980 Moscow	Triple jump
European Indoor Championships
Silver medal – second place	1977 San Sebastián	Triple jump
Silver medal – second place	1980 Sindelfingen	Triple jump
Bronze medal – third place	1979 Vienna	Triple jump
Summer Universiade
Silver medal – second place	1979 Mexico City	Triple jump

Jaak Uudmäe (born 3 September 1954) is an Estonian former triple jumper and long jumper who competed for the Soviet Union. He was the gold medalist at the 1980 Summer Olympics. He set a personal best of 17.35 m (56 ft 11 in) in his Olympic victory – a mark which remains the Estonian record.

In 1979 and 1980, Uudmäe was acknowledged as Estonian Athlete of the Year. In 1980, Uudmäe's coach, Jaan Jürgenson, was nominated as the USSR Coach of the Year, and Jaak himself as the USSR Master Sportsman of the Year. He was the runner-up at the 1979 Soviet Spartakiad, behind Gennadiy Valyukevich.

His two sons, Jaanus Uudmäe and Jaak Joonas Uudmäe, are also both long and triple jumpers.

== 1980 Olympics ==
His victory at the 1980 Summer Olympics was adjudicated by an all-Soviet panel. Some observers later claimed that the bronze medalist João Carlos de Oliveira and fifth-placer Ian Campbell both produced multiple jumps longer than Uudmäe's, though the Soviet judges ruled all these as fouls, to protestations from the athletes and questioning by several observers. Uudmäe's longest jump was also ruled as a foul. In 2015, Athletics Australia made a request to the International Association of Athletics Federations to investigate the matter and review the outcome.

== International competitions ==
Year	Competition	Venue	Position	Event	Notes
1977	European Indoor Championships	San Sebastián, Spain	2nd	Triple jump	16.46 m
1979	European Indoor Championships	Vienna, Austria	3rd	Triple jump	16.91 m
1979	Universiade	Mexico City, Mexico	2nd	Triple jump	17.20 m
1980	Olympic Games	Moscow, Soviet Union	1st	Triple jump	17.35 m
1980	European Indoor Championships	Sindelfingen, West Germany	2nd	Triple jump	16.51 m
1981	World Cup	Rome, Italy	4th	Triple jump	16.83 m
1981	European Cup	Zagreb, Yugoslavia	1st	Triple jump	16.97 m
1983	European Indoor Championships	Budapest, Hungary	5th	Triple jump	16.56 m

== National titles ==
- Estonian Athletics Championships
  - Triple jump: 1976, 1978, 1983, 1986, 1988
- Estonian Indoor Championships
  - Triple jump: 1975, 1977, 1978, 1983, 1985
  - Long jump: 1978

== See also ==
- Triple jump at the Olympics
- 100 great Estonians of the 20th century
- List of Estonian sportspeople
- List of Olympic medalists in athletics (men)
- List of European Athletics Indoor Championships medalists (men)

Awards
Preceded by Aavo Pikkuus	Estonian Sportsman of the Year; 1979 – 1980	Succeeded by Jüri Poljans
