= Dan Simion =

Romanian triple jumper (born 1958)

Personal information
- Born: 28 January 1958 (age 68)

Sport
- Sport: Track and field

Dan Simion (born 28 January 1958) is a retired Romanian triple jumper.

He competed at the 1983 World Championships without reaching the final round.

His personal best jump was 17.09 metres, achieved in May 1983 in Sofia. This ranks him fourth among Romanian triple jumpers, only behind Marian Oprea, Bedros Bedrosian and Carol Corbu.

After retiring he became a coach, and was educated in physiotherapy. He moved to Norway in the early 1990s and trained high jumper Steinar Hoen among others.
