= Antonio Páez =

Spanish middle-distance runner

Antonio Páez Montero
Personal information
- Nationality: Spanish
- Born: September 5, 1956 (age 69) Arenas del Rey, Granada, Spain

Sport
- Sport: Athletics
- Event: 800 metres
Medal record
Men's athletics
Representing Spain
European Indoor Championships
Gold medal – first place	1979 Vienna	800 m
Gold medal – first place	1982 Milan	800 m
Bronze medal – third place	1981 Grenoble	800 m

Antonio Páez Montero (born 5 September 1956 in Arenas del Rey) is a retired Spanish middle-distance runner. He is best known for winning two medals at the European Indoor Championships and for competing in the men's 800 metres at the 1980 Summer Olympicsin Moscow.

== Early life and career ==
Páez was born in Arenas del Rey, in the province of Granada, Spain. He rose to prominence in Spanish athletics during the late 1970s, particularly in indoor middle-distance competitions.

== International career ==
Páez’s breakthrough came at the 1979 European Athletics Indoor Championships held in Vienna, where he won the gold medal in the men's 800 metres with a time of 1:47.4, setting a Spanish indoor record and becoming the first Spaniard to win a European indoor title in athletics.

He returned to the podium in the 1981 European Athletics Indoor Championships in Grenoble, earning the bronze medal in the same event.

At the 1982 European Athletics Indoor Championships in Milan, Páez claimed his second continental title in the 800 metres, reinforcing his status as one of Europe’s leading indoor runners.

== Olympic Games ==
Páez represented Spain at the 1980 Summer Olympics in Moscow, competing in the men's 800 metres. He finished 14th overall, missing out on the final round.

== National career ==
Domestically, Páez held multiple Spanish national records in the 800 metres and was a **repeated national champion** in both indoor and outdoor events during the late 1970s and early 1980s.

== Legacy ==
Antonio Páez is widely recognized as a pioneer of Spanish middle-distance running. His historic win in 1979 marked a turning point for Spain in international athletics. He is featured in the Royal Spanish Athletics Federation’s (RFEA) centennial book 100 años de una pasión, which highlights his contribution to the sport.

== Achievements ==
Year	Tournament	Venue	Result	Extra
1979	European Indoor Championships	Vienna, Austria	1st	
1981	European Indoor Championships	Grenoble, France	3rd	
1982	European Indoor Championships	Milan, Italy	1st	
