= András Paróczai =

Hungarian middle-distance runner

Medal record

Men's athletics

Representing Hungary

European Indoor Championships
Bronze medal – third place	1979 Vienna	800 m
Silver medal – second place	1980 Sindelfingen	800 m
Silver medal – second place	1981 Grenoble	800 m

András Paróczai (born 11 May 1956) is a retired middle distance runner from Hungary. He won three medals at the European Indoor Championships. He took part on the 1980 Summer Olympics in Moscow.
