= Herbert Wursthorn =

German middle-distance runner

Personal information
- Born: 22 June 1957 (age 69) Würtingen, West Germany

Sport
- Sport: Track and field
Medal record
Representing West Germany
European Indoor Championships
Gold medal – first place	1981 Grenoble	800 m
Bronze medal – third place	1980 Sindelfingen	800 m

Herbert Wursthorn (born 22 June 1957) is a retired West German middle-distance runner who specialized in the 800 metres.

He won the bronze medal at the 1980 European Athletics Indoor Championships and the gold medal at the 1981 European Athletics Indoor Championships. His personal best time was 1:46.75 minutes, achieved in 1980 in Warsaw.

At the West German championships, Wursthorn won silver medals in the 800 metres three times; in 1980 indoor, 1985 outdoor and 1986 indoor. He represented the club VfB Stuttgart.
