= Armando Herrera (triple jumper) =

Cuban triple jumper (born 1955)

Personal information
- Full name: Armando Herrera Leal
- Born: 25 May 1955 (age 71)
- Height: 1.94 m (6 ft 4 in)
- Weight: 87 kg (192 lb)

Sport
- Sport: Athletics
- Event: Long jump

Armando Herrera Leal (born May 25, 1955) is a retired male triple jumper from Cuba, who represented his native country twice at the Summer Olympics: 1976 and 1980. His best Olympic result was finishing in 11th place in Moscow, USSR (1980) with a leap of 16.03 meters. He was also the silver medallist in the event at the 1974 Central American and Caribbean Games. In 1983, Herrera retired from athletics.

His younger brother, Alejandro Herrera, was also a triple jumper.

His personal bests in the event is 16.85 metres set in 1980.

== International competitions ==
| Year | Competition | Venue | Position | Event | Notes |
Representing Cuba
| 1974 | Central American and Caribbean Games | Santo Domingo, Dominican Republic | 2nd | Triple jump | 16.37 m (w) |
| 1975 | Pan American Games | Mexico City, Mexico | 6th | Triple jump | 16.35 m |
| 1976 | Olympic Games | Montreal, Canada | 19th (q) | Triple jump | 15.98 m |
| 1980 | Olympic Games | Moscow, Soviet Union | 11th | Triple jump | 16.03 m |
