= Klaus-Peter Nabein =

Personal information
- Born: 10 May 1960 Goldbach, Bavaria West Germany
- Died: 12 October 2009 (aged 49) Veitsbronn, Germany
- Height: 1.86 m (6 ft 1 in)
- Weight: 74 kg (163 lb)

Sport
- Sport: Athletics
- Event(s): 800 m, 1500 m, half marathon
Medal record
Men's athletics
Representing West Germany
European Indoor Championships
Silver medal – second place	1982 Milan	800 m

Klaus-Peter Nabein (10 May 1960 – 12 October 2009) was a German middle- and long-distance runner. He won medals at the 1982 and 1987 European Indoor Championships. In addition, he competed at the 1989 World Indoor Championships. Later in his career he competed primarily in road races.

== International competitions ==
Year	Competition	Venue	Position	Event	Notes
Representing West Germany
1977	European Junior Championships	Donetsk, Soviet Union	25th (h)	2000 m s'chase	6:29.0
1979	European Junior Championships	Bydgoszcz, Poland	1st	800 m	1:48.18
1980	European Indoor Championships	Sindelfingen, West Germany	4th	800 m	1:51.4
1982	European Indoor Championships	Milan, Italy	2nd	800 m	1:48.31
1986	European Championships	Stuttgart, West Germany	11th (h)	1500 m	3:40.44
1987	European Indoor Championships	Liévin, France	3rd	1500 m	3:45.84
1989	European Indoor Championships	The Hague, Netherlands	6th (h)	1500 m	3:44.91
1989	World Indoor Championships	Budapest, Hungary	11th (h)	3000 m	7:53.15
Representing Germany
1993	World Half Marathon Championships	Brussels, Belgium	49th	Half marathon	1:03:38
1994	World Half Marathon Championships	Oslo, Norway	62nd	Half marathon	1:04:47
1996	World Half Marathon Championships	Palma de Mallorca, Spain	–	Half marathon	DNF

== Personal bests ==
Outdoor

- 800 metres – 1:46.03 (Lausanne 1982)
- 1000 metres – 2:20.12 (Ingelheim 1982)
- 1500 metres – 3:35.98 (Hengelo 1986)
- One mile – 3:54.11 (Lausanne 1986)
- 3000 metres – 7:53.51 (Birmingham 1989)
- 5000 metres – 13:42.80 (Koblenz 1989)
- Half marathon – 1:03:38 (Brussels 1995)
- Marathon – 2:14:16 (Hannover 1996)

Indoor

- 800 metres – 1:48.31 (Milan 1982)
- 1500 metres – 3:42.59 (Stuttgart 1989)
- 3000 metres – 7:53.15 (Budapest 1989)
