= Montenegrin News Agency =

Montenegrin News Agency, or MINA, is a Montenegrin national news agency which was formed on March 11, 2002. It is based in Podgorica, the Capital City of Montenegro. Montenegrin News Agency's current executive director is Jaša Jovićević. It has services in Montenegrin, Serbian (and the other standard varieties of Serbo-Croatian), as well in Albanian and English.
