= Charles Borromeo (athlete) =

Indian middle-distance runner

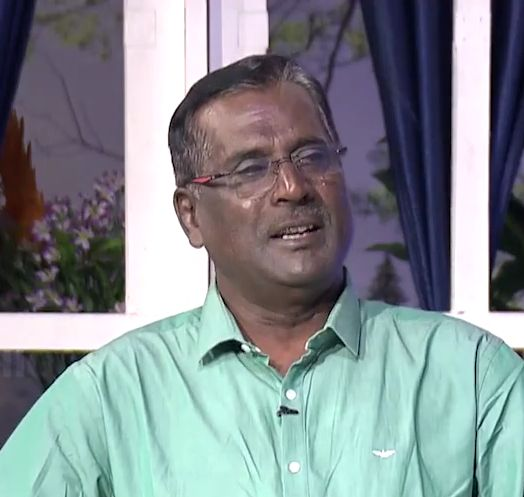
- Charles Borromeo in 2022.

Personal information
- Full name: Charles Borromeo
- Nationality: Indian
- Born: 1 December 1958 (age 67) Devakottai, Tamil Nadu, India

Sport
- Country: India
- Sport: Track and field
- Event: 800 metres
Medal record
athletics
Representing India
Asian Games
Gold medal – first place	1982 New Delhi	800 m
Asian Championships
Silver medal – second place	1985 Jakarta	800 m

Charles Borromeo (born 1 December 1958) is a former Indian track and field athlete. He was awarded Arjuna Award in 1982 for winning gold at the 1982 Asian Games in Delhi at a record time of 1:46:81 seconds in India. He represented India in the 1984 Summer Olympics at Los Angeles. His time in the limelight may be short, yet his efforts won him the prestigious Padma Shri civilian award in India in 1984. After retirement, he continued to work in developing sports at the national level in India. He served as the National Sports Director of Special Olympics Bharat, a programme run by the Special Olympics International in India.

== Early life ==
Charles Borromeo was born on 1 December 1958 in the town of Devakottai, located in Sivaganga district in the Indian state of Tamil Nadu. He did his schooling in Muthathal Middle School and De Britto Hr. Sec. School, Devakottai.

He moved to Ahmedabad for college, graduating from St. Xavier's College. Even while at college, his passion and ability for sports earned him the Best Sportsman Award. His record time at the Inter-University Meet in 1978 provided him a ticket to the international arena, to represent the Indian universities at the 1979 Summer Universiade, held in Mexico City.

== Career ==
Borromeo later joined Tata Steel as Sports Assistant in 1979 and participated in a number of track and field meets.

In 1982 he rose to the limelight. He topped the six-nation Athletic Meet in Mumbai, winning the Inter-State Championship at Kozhikode and won the Gold at the Pakistan National Games at Peshawar. He won a Bronze at the Peking International Games in China and toured Germany representing the Indian athletic team.

At the 1982 Asian Games at Jawaharlal Nehru Stadium, Delhi, he represented India and won the 800m gold with a record time of 1:46:81 seconds (Sri Ram Singh holds national record 1:45.77 did in Montreal Olympics 1976)He was the first Tata employee to win a Gold in the Asian Games.

In 1984 Tata honored him as the Best Sportsman. Borromeo later represented India at a number of track and field meets around the world, including Japan and China, where he again won gold. He represented India at the 1984 Summer Olympics at Los Angeles. He was eliminated in the first round after finishing fifth with a time of 1:51.52.

Borromeo was the captain of the Indian team at the Asian Track and Field meet in Jakarta and the 1985 South Asian Federation Games in Dhaka. He won silver in both the meets. He retired as an athlete in 1986 at the age of 28, after experiencing recurring knee problems.

He was awarded the Arjuna Award in 1982 and the Padma Shri in 1984 by the Government of India.

== Post-retirement ==
Post-retirement Borromeo has been involved with Special Olympics. He became the National Sports Director of the Special Olympics Bharat, the Indian arm of the Special Olympics International focussing on the development of sports for the mentally challenged people. He served the sports federation till 2005.
