= Bedros Bedrosian =

Romanian triple jumper

Personal information
- Born: 21 May 1955 (age 71)

Sport
- Sport: Track and field

Bedros Bedrosian (born 21 May 1955) is a retired male triple jumper from Romania. His personal best jump was 17.27 metres, achieved in June 1984 in Bucharest. This ranks him second among Romanian triple jumpers, only behind Marian Oprea.

He finished fourteenth at the 1980 European Indoor Championships and sixth at the 1982 European Championships in Athletics. He became national champion five consecutive seasons: 1980 - 1984.

Upon retirement he transitioned to coaching. He was hired as jumping coach for the Saudi Arabi national team, notably training Hussein Taher Al-Sabee and Mohamed Salman Al-Khuwalidi.

== Achievements ==
| Year | Competition | Venue | Position | Event | Notes |
Representing Romania
| 1977 | Universiade | Sofia, Bulgaria | 18th (q) | Triple jump | 15.35 m |
| 1979 | Universiade | Mexico City, Mexico | 8th | Triple jump | 16.18 m |
| 1980 | European Indoor Championships | Sindelfingen, West Germany | 14th | Triple jump | 15.74 m |
| 1981 | Universiade | Bucharest, Romania | 8th | Triple jump | 16.39 m |
| 1982 | European Championships | Athens, Greece | 6th | Triple jump | 16.46 m |
| 1983 | Universiade | Edmonton, Canada | 5th | Triple jump | 16.82 m |
| 1983 | World Championships | Helsinki, Finland | 11th | Triple jump | 16.18 m |
