= Alejandro Herrera (athlete) =

Cuban triple jumper (born 1958)

Personal information
- Full name: Alejandro Herrera Leal
- Nationality: Cuban
- Born: 21 April 1958 (age 68) Wajay, Cuba
- Height: 1.97 m (6 ft 6 in)
- Weight: 93 kg (205 lb)

Sport
- Sport: Athletics
- Event: Triple jump

Alejandro Herrera Leal (born 21 April 1958) is a Cuban athlete. He competed in the men's triple jump at the 1980 Summer Olympics.

His personal best in the triple jump is 16.90 metres set in 1980. His older brother, Armando Herrera, was also a triple jumper.

== International competitions ==
Year	Competition	Venue	Position	Event	Notes
Representing Cuba
1977	Central American and Caribbean Championships	Xalapa, Mexico	2nd	Triple jump	15.66 m
1978	Central American and Caribbean Games	Medellín, Colombia	3rd	Triple jump	16.10 m
1979	Pan American Games	San Juan, Puerto Rico	4th	Triple jump	16.46 m
1980	Olympic Games	Moscow, Soviet Union	–	Triple jump	NM
1981	Central American and Caribbean Championships	Santo Domingo, Dominican Republic	2nd	Triple jump	16.29 m
1982	Central American and Caribbean Games	Havana, Cuba	6th	Long jump	7.57 m
