= Shamil Abbyasov =

Kyrgyzstani long and triple jumper (born 1957)

Medal record

Men's athletics

Representing Soviet Union

European Indoor Championships
| Gold medal – first place | 1981 Grenoble | Triple jump |
| Bronze medal – third place | 1981 Grenoble | Long jump |

Shamil Abbyasov (born 16 April 1957) is a retired athlete, who represented the USSR and later Kyrgyzstan. He specialized in the long jump and triple jump.

Abbyasov won a bronze and a gold medal at the 1981 European Indoor Championships in Grenoble. His gold medal was in triple jump with an indoor world record of 17.30, that lasted for three weeks.
