= Bulgarian Athletics Championships =

Annual track and field competition

- Sport: Track and field
- Founded: 1926
- Country: Bulgaria

The Bulgarian Athletics Championships (Bulgarian: Българско първенство по лека атлетика) is an annual outdoor track and field competition organised by the Bulgarian Athletic Federation, which serves as the national championship for the sport in Bulgaria.

Typically organised in July, the event was first held in 1926 and introduced the first events for women in 1938. Separate annual championship events are held for cross country running, road running and racewalking events. There is also a Bulgarian Indoor Athletics Championships.

== Events ==
The competition programme features a total of 38 individual Bulgarian Championship athletics events, 19 for men and 19 for women. For each of the sexes, there are seven track running events, three obstacle events, four jumps, four throws, and one combined track and field event.

Track running

- 100 metres, 200 metres, 400 metres, 800 metres, 1500 metres, 5000 metres, 10,000 metres

Obstacle events

- 100 metres hurdles (women only), 110 metres hurdles (men only), 400 metres hurdles, 3000 metres steeplechase

Jumping events

- Pole vault, high jump, long jump, triple jump

Throwing events

- Shot put, discus throw, javelin throw, hammer throw

Combined events

- Decathlon (men only), Heptathlon (women only)

A men's 200 metres hurdles was held from 1969–74. A men's 10,000 metres race walk and women's 5000 metres race walk were formerly on the schedule, but were removed after 2001.

The women's programme gradually expanded to match the men's. On the track, the 1500 m was added in 1968, the 3000 metres in 1976 and the 10,000 metres in 1983. The 3000 m was replaced by a 5000 m in 1995. The 80 metres hurdles was contested until 1969, after which the international standard distance of 100 m hurdles was used. A 200 m hurdles event was introduced in 1969, then replaced by the longer 400 m event in 1976. Similarly, the women's pentathlon was replaced by the heptathlon in 1981. The women's field events reached parity with the men's after the addition of triple jump in 1991, pole vault in 1995 and hammer throw in 1996. The women's steeplechase was the last event to be added to the programme, appearing from the 2002 championships onwards.
