= Anatoliy Piskulin =

Soviet triple jumper

Personal information
- Born: 1 December 1952 (age 73)

Sport
- Sport: Track and field
Medal record
Representing Soviet Union
European Championships
Bronze medal – third place	1978 Prague	Triple jump
European Indoor Championships
Gold medal – first place	1978 Milan	Triple jump
Silver medal – second place	1979 Vienna	Triple jump
Summer Universiade
Gold medal – first place	1977 Sofia	Triple jump
Silver medal – second place	1975 Rome	Triple jump

Anatoliy Piskulin (Russian: Анато́лий Писку́лин; born 1 December 1952) is a retired triple jumper who represented the Soviet Union. He won two medals at the European Indoor Championships as well as a bronze medal at the 1978 European Championships in Athletics.

== Achievements ==
Year	Tournament	Venue	Result	Extra
1975	Universiade	Rome, Italy	2nd	
1977	Universiade	Sofia, Bulgaria	1st	
1978	European Indoor Championships	Milan, Italy	1st	
	European Championships	Prague, Czechoslovakia	3rd	
1979	European Indoor Championships	Vienna, Austria	2nd	
