= Keith Connor =

British athlete (born 1957)

Personal information
- Nationality: British/Anguillian
- Born: 16 September 1957 (age 68) South Hill, Anguilla
- Height: 186 cm (6 ft 1 in)
- Weight: 78 kg (172 lb)

Sport
- Sport: Athletics
- Event: triple jump
- Club: Wolverhampton & Bilston AC; Windsor, Slough & Eton AC
Medal record
Men's athletics
Representing Great Britain
Olympic Games
Bronze medal – third place	1984 Los Angeles	Triple jump
European Championships
Gold medal – first place	1982 Athens	Triple jump
European Indoor Championships
Silver medal – second place	1978 Milan	Triple jump
Summer Universiade
Bronze medal – third place	1981 Bucharest	Triple jump
Representing England
Commonwealth Games
Gold medal – first place	1978 Edmonton	Triple jump
Gold medal – first place	1982 Brisbane	Triple jump

Keith Leroy Connor (born 16 September 1957 in Anguilla, an Overseas Territory of the United Kingdom) is a male retired athlete who represented Great Britain and England. He competed in the triple jump at the 1980 Summer Olympics and the 1984 Summer Olympics.

== Biography ==
=== Athletics career ===
Connor migrated with his parents to Great Britain in 1964. He went on to represent Great Britain as an athlete.

Connor finished second behind Aston Moore in the triple jump event at both the 1976 AAA Championships and the 1978 AAA Championships. Despite being beaten by Moore at the AAAs, he gained revenge by winning the gold medal for England in the triple jump event, at the 1978 Commonwealth Games in Edmonton, Canada, with Moore taking the bronze.

Connor finally became the British triple jump champion after winning the British AAA Championships title at the 1979 AAA Championships. The following year at the 1980 Olympics Games in Moscow, he represented Great Britain, finishing just outside the medals in fourth place.

Two years later he won the triple jump gold again when he represented England, at the 1982 Commonwealth Games in Brisbane, Australia. He then won the 1982 European Athletics Championships gold and a bronze medal at the 1984 Summer Olympics in Los Angeles.

Connor attended the University of Texas at El Paso in the USA from 1978 to 1980 and later transferred to Southern Methodist University (SMU) where he competed with distinction in the US national collegiate athletic association (NCAA). .

=== Coaching career ===
He retired from active competition in 1984 due to injury and began an illustrious career as a coach and sports administrator. Connor was appointed head coach at the New South Wales Institute of Sport in 1990, after spending several years coaching on the American college scene following his retirement from competition. He was credited with helping Australian athletes to win medals at the Barcelona, Atlanta and Sydney Olympics due to his work in revamping the New South Wales Institute of Sport. Following his successes at NSW Institute of Sport, Connor was appointed as head coach of Athletics Australia in 2001.

The Australian press has described him, admiringly, as a hard-nosed disciplinarian. Herb Elliott, chairman of an Australian Sports Commission review of the sport, said: "There is a view that he has moved the sport forward. He's had to take some very tough action. As a consequence, he's rubbed a few people up the wrong way and some are against him… but he's done an excellent job." In 2006 Keith was turned down for the job of Head Coach to the British Athletics Board although he was regarded by most as the best candidate. This was his second rejection by BAB, the first being in 1990. Allegations of racism surrounded his rejection.

== Personal life ==
Since the expiration of his contract in 2006 Keith has been a Sport Consultant to national associations, sporting bodies, sponsors and individuals.

== International competitions ==
Year	Competition	Venue	Position	Event	Notes
Representing Great Britain
1978	European Indoor Championships	Milan, Italy	2nd	Triple jump	16.53 m
1978	Commonwealth Games	Edmonton, Canada	1st	Triple jump	17.21 m w
1982	European Championships	Athens, Greece	1st	Triple jump	17.29 m
1982	Commonwealth Games	Brisbane, Australia	1st	Triple jump	17.81 m w
1983	World Championships	Helsinki, Finland	15th (q)	Triple Jump	16.18 m
1984	Olympic Games	Los Angeles, United States	3rd	Triple jump	16.87 m
