= Karel Hradil (triple jumper) =

Czechoslovak triple jumper

Personal information
- Nationality: Czech
- Born: 27 November 1953 (age 72) Czechoslovakia

Sport
- Sport: Athletics
- Club: Dukla Prague

Karel Hradil (born 27 November 1953) is a retired Czechoslovak triple jumper.

He finished eighth at the 1979 European Indoor Championships. He became Czechoslovak champion in 1979, representing Dukla Prague at Stadion Evžena Rošického in Strahov and jumping 15.74 metres. He was a two-time indoor national champion, winning the Czechoslovak indoor title in 1977 and 1979.
