= Zdzisław Sobora =

Polish triple jumper

Personal information
- Born: 2 October 1952 (age 73)

Sport
- Sport: Track and field

Zdzisław Sobora (born 2 October 1952) is a retired Polish triple jumper.

He finished fourth at the 1977 European Indoor Championships. He became Polish champion in 1980, and Polish indoor champion in 1977, 1979 and 1981.

His personal best jump was 16.72 metres, achieved in July 1980 in Poznań.
