= 1981 European Athletics Indoor Championships =

- Dates: 21–22 February 1981
- Host city: Grenoble; France
- Venue: Palais des Sports
- Events: 20
- Participation: 257 athletes from 23 nations

The 1981 European Athletics Indoor Championships were held in Grenoble, a city in France, between 21–22 February 1981. It was the second time the championships were held in the city. The track used for the championships was 180 metres long.

== Medal summary ==
=== Men ===
Event	Gold		Silver		Bronze	
50 metres	Marian Woronin (POL)	5.65	Vladimir Muravyov (URS)	5.76	Andrey Shlyapnikov (URS)	5.77
400 metres	Andreas Knebel (GDR)	46.52	Martin Weppler (FRG)	46.88	Stefano Malinverni (ITA)	46.96
800 metres	Herbert Wursthorn (FRG)	1:47.70	András Paróczai (HUN)	1:47.73	Antonio Páez (ESP)	1:48.31
1500 metres	Thomas Wessinghage (FRG)	3:42.64	Uwe Becker (FRG)	3:43.02	Mirosław Żerkowski (POL)	3:44.32
3000 metres^{1}	Alex Gonzalez (FRA)	7:22.71	Evgeni Ignatov (BUL)	No time	Valeriy Abramov (URS)	No time
50 metres hurdles	Arto Bryggare (FIN)	6.47	Javier Moracho (ESP)	6.48	Guy Drut (FRA)	6.54
5000 metres walk	Hartwig Gauder (GDR)	19:08.59 CR	Maurizio Damilano (ITA)	19:13.90	Gérard Lelievre (FRA)	19:55.02
High jump	Roland Dalhäuser (SUI)	2.28	Carlo Thränhardt (FRG)	2.25	Dietmar Mögenburg (FRG)	2.25
Pole vault	Thierry Vigneron (FRA)	5.70 =WR	Aleksandr Krupskiy (URS)	5.65	Jean-Michel Bellot (FRA)	5.65
Long jump	Rolf Bernhard (SUI)	8.01	Antonio Corgos (ESP)	7.97	Shamil Abbyasov (URS)	7.95
Triple jump	Shamil Abbyasov (URS)	17.30 WR	Klaus Kübler (FRG)	16.73	Aston Moore (GBR)	16.73
Shot put	Reijo Ståhlberg (FIN)	19.88	Luc Viudès (FRA)	19.41	Zlatan Saracevic (YUG)	19.40

^{1} The race was stopped one lap short (at 2820m) due to an official's error.

=== Women ===
Event	Gold		Silver		Bronze	
50 metres	Sofka Popova (BUL)	6.17	Linda Haglund (SWE)	6.17	Marita Koch (GDR)	6.19
400 metres	Jarmila Kratochvílová (TCH)	50.07 CR	Natalya Bochina (URS)	52.32	Verona Elder (GBR)	52.37
800 metres	Hildegard Ullrich (GDR)	2:00.94	Svetla Zlateva (BUL)	2:01.37	Nikolina Shtereva (BUL)	2:02.50
1500 metres	Agnese Possamai (ITA)	4:07.49	Valentina Ilyinykh (URS)	4:08.17	Lyubov Smolka (URS)	4:08.64
50 metres hurdles	Zofia Bielczyk (POL)	6.74 =WR	Maria Kemenchezhi (URS)	6.80	Tatyana Anisimova (URS)	6.81
High jump	Sara Simeoni (ITA)	1.97 CR	Elżbieta Krawczuk (POL)	1.94	Urszula Kielan (POL)	1.94
Long jump	Karin Hänel (FRG)	6.77 WR	Sigrid Heimann (GDR)	6.66	Jasmin Fischer (FRG)	6.65
Shot put	Ilona Slupianek (GDR)	20.77	Helena Fibingerová (TCH)	20.64	Helma Knorscheidt (GDR)	20.12

== Medal table ==
Rank	Nation	Gold	Silver	Bronze	Total
1	East Germany (GDR)	4	1	2	7
2	West Germany (FRG)	3	4	2	9
3	France (FRA)	2	1	3	6
4	Poland (POL)	2	1	2	5
5	Italy (ITA)	2	1	1	4
6	Finland (FIN)	2	0	0	2
6	Switzerland (SUI)	2	0	0	2
8	Soviet Union (URS)	1	5	5	11
9	Bulgaria (BUL)	1	2	1	4
10	Czechoslovakia (TCH)	1	1	0	2
11	Spain (ESP)	0	2	1	3
12	Hungary (HUN)	0	1	0	1
12	Sweden (SWE)	0	1	0	1
14	Great Britain (GBR)	0	0	2	2
15	Yugoslavia (YUG)	0	0	1	1
Totals (15 entries)		20	20	20	60

== Participating nations ==
- Austria (8)
- Belgium (6)
- Bulgaria (18)
- Czechoslovakia (10)
- Denmark (5)
- East Germany (12)
- Finland (10)
- France (38)
- Great Britain (17)
- Greece (5)
- Hungary (8)
- Iceland (2)
- Italy (21)
- Netherlands (3)
- Norway (1)
- Poland (10)
- Portugal (1)
- Soviet Union (22)
- Spain (12)
- Sweden (9)
- Switzerland (6)
- West Germany (27)
- Yugoslavia (6)

== See also ==
- 1981 in athletics (track and field)
