= Aston Moore =

Jamaican-British triple jump athlete

Aston Moore MBE
Personal information
- Nationality: British/Jamaican
- Born: 8 February 1956 (age 70) Spanish Town, Jamaica
- Height: 1.80 m (5 ft 11 in)
- Weight: 79 kg (174 lb)

Sport
- Sport: Athletics
- Event: Triple jump
- Club: Birchfield Harriers
Medal record
Representing United Kingdom
Men's athletics
Commonwealth Games
Bronze medal – third place	1978 Edmonton	Triple jump
Bronze medal – third place	1982 Brisbane	Triple jump
European Indoor Championships
Bronze medal – third place	1981 Grenoble	Triple jump

Aston Llewellyn Moore MBE (born 8 February 1956) is a male Jamaican-born former track and field athlete who competed for Great Britain, specialising in the triple jump event. He competed at the 1976 Summer Olympics.

== Biography ==
Moore became the British triple jump champion after winning the British AAA Championships title at the 1976 AAA Championships. He was duly selected to represent Great Britain at the 1976 Olympics Games in Montreal but failed to progress past the qualifying rounds.

He regained his AAA title at the 1978 AAA Championships and shortly afterwards won a bronze medal with a jump of 16.69 metres, representing England at the 1978 Commonwealth Games in Edmonton, Canada.

Moore finished second behind American Paul Jordan at the 1980 AAA Championships but by virtue of being the highest placed British athlete was considered the British champion and at the 1981 AAA Championships he won his third title outright. He also won a bronze medal with a jump of 16.73 m at the 1981 European Indoor Championships, finishing third behind Shamil Abbyasov and Klaus Kübler.

In 1982 he represented England in Brisbane, Australia and with a wind-assisted 16.76 m, he won the bronze medal. He also represented England, at the 1986 Commonwealth Games in Edinburgh, Scotland.

After his retirement from athletics Moore focused on coaching triple jump to younger generations. He has helped train Ashia Hansen, current UK and former world record holder for indoor triple jump, and Phillips Idowu, an Olympic silver medallist. His son Jonathan Moore won the gold medal for triple jump at the 2001 World Youth Championships.

Moore was appointed Member of the Order of the British Empire (MBE) in the 2023 New Year Honours for services to athletics.

He is currently an athletics coach, based in Birmingham, West Midlands. He is a member of the National Coaching Federation and is employed as national event coach for the triple jump by UK Athletics.
