= Binko Kolev =

Bulgarian middle-distance runner

Personal information
- Nationality: Bulgarian
- Born: 28 July 1958 (age 67) Nova Zagora, Sliven, Bulgaria
- Height: 178 cm (5 ft 10 in)
- Weight: 63 kg (139 lb)

Sport
- Country: Bulgaria
- Sport: Middle-distance running

Achievements and titles
- Personal best: 800 – 1:46.3 (1979)
Medal record
Men's athletics
Representing Bulgaria
European Indoor Championships
Silver medal – second place	1979 Vienna	800 m

Binko Ganev Kolev (born 28 July 1958) is a Bulgarian Olympic middle-distance runner. He represented his country at the 1980 Summer Olympics.
