= Roberto Mazzucato =

Italian triple jumper

Personal information
- Nationality: Italian
- Born: March 13, 1954 (age 72) Rome, Italy

Sport
- Country: Italy
- Sport: Athletics
- Event: Triple jump
- Club: CUS Roma

Achievements and titles
- Personal best: Triple jump: 16.92 m (1979)
Medal record
Representing Italy
Summer Universiade
Bronze medal – third place	1979 Mexico City	Triple jump

Roberto Mazzucato (born 13 March 1954) is a retired male triple jumper from Italy.

== Biography ==
His personal best jump was 16.92 metres, achieved in August 1979 in Turin. The Italian record currently belongs to Fabrizio Donato with 17.60 metres. He has 32 caps in national team from 1973 to 1986.

== Achievements ==
Year	Competition	Venue	Position	Event	Notes
1977	European Indoor Championships	San Sebastián, Spain	7th	Triple jump	
1979	European Indoor Championships	Vienna, Austria	7th	Triple jump	
1979	Universiade	Mexico City, Mexico	3rd	Triple jump	16.87 m
1982	European Indoor Championships	Milan, Italy	8th	Triple jump	
1982	European Championships	Athens, Greece	8th	Triple jump	16.13 m
1983	European Indoor Championships	Budapest, Hungary	8th	Triple jump	

== National titles ==
He has won 6 times the individual national championship.

- 3 wins in the triple jump (1977, 1979, 1982)
- 3 wins in the triple jump indoor (1982, 1983, 1986)

== See also ==
- Italian all-time top lists - Triple jump
- Triple jump winners of Italian Athletics Championships
