= Miloš Srejović =

Personal information
- Born: April 12, 1956 (age 70)
Medal record
Men's athletics
Representing Yugoslavia
European Championships
| Gold medal – first place | 1978 Prague | Triple jump |
Mediterranean Games
| Silver medal – second place | 1979 Split | Triple jump |
European Junior Championships
| Bronze medal – third place | 1975 Athens | Triple jump |

Miloš Srejović (Serbian Cyrillic: Милош Срејовић; born April 12, 1956) is a former Serbian track and field athlete who competed in the triple jump for Yugoslavia. He was named the BTA Best Balkan Athlete of the Year in 1978.

== Career ==
He won a gold medal at the 1978 European Championships in the event. His coach was Vladimir "Vlada" Luković, Milan Spasojević and Aleksandar Marinković. He was a member and performed for AK Radnički Kragujevac.

His personal best of 17.01 metres is the Serbian national record for the triple jump.
