= Paolo Piapan =

Italian triple jumper

Personal information
- Nationality: Italian
- Born: August 31, 1956 (age 69) Trieste, Italy

Sport
- Country: Italy
- Sport: Athletics
- Event: Triple jump
- Club: CUS Roma

Achievements and titles
- Personal best: Triple jump: 16.54 m (1979)

Paolo Piapan (born 31 August 1956, in Trieste) is a retired Italian triple jumper.

== Biography ==
He finished fifth at the 1971 European Indoor Championships in Milan.

His personal best jump was 16.54 metres, achieved in May 1979 in Salsomaggiore. The Italian record currently belongs to Fabrizio Donato with 17.60 metres. He has 23 caps in national team from 1975 to 1986.

== National titles ==
Paolo Piapan has won the individual national championship five times.

- 3 wins in the triple jump (1976, 1978, 1981)
- 2 wins in the triple jump indoor (1978, 1979)

== See also ==
- Triple jump winners of Italian Athletics Championships
