= Gennadiy Valyukevich =

Soviet athlete (1958–2019)

Personal information
- Born: 1 June 1958
- Died: 30 December 2019 (aged 61)

Sport
- Sport: Track and field
Medal record
Representing Soviet Union
European Indoor Championships
Gold medal – first place	1979 Vienna	Triple jump
Silver medal – second place	1982 Milan	Triple jump
Silver medal – second place	1983 Budapest	Triple jump

Gennadiy Valyukevich (Belarusian: Генадзь Валюкевіч; 1 June 1958 – 30 December 2019) was a triple jumper who represented the USSR and later Belarus. He won three medals at the European Indoor Championships.

He was the father of Dmitrij Valukevic, who currently represents Slovakia.

== Achievements ==
Year	Competition	Venue	Position	Notes
1979	European Indoor Championships	Vienna, Austria	1st	
1982	European Indoor Championships	Athens, Greece	2nd	
1983	European Indoor Championships	Budapest, Hungary	2nd	
