= Klaus Kübler =

German triple jumper

Personal information
- Born: 17 April 1959 (age 67) Schwäbisch Hall, West Germany

Sport
- Sport: Track and field
Medal record
Representing West Germany
European Indoor Championships
| Silver medal – second place | 1981 Grenoble | Triple jump |

Klaus Kübler (born 17 April 1959) is a retired West German triple jumper.

He became West German champion in 1977 and 1980.

== Achievements ==
| Year | Tournament | Venue | Result | Extra |
|---|---|---|---|---|
| 1977 | European Junior Championships | Donetsk, Soviet Union | 3rd | |
| 1980 | European Indoor Championships | Sindelfingen, West Germany | 6th | |
| 1981 | European Indoor Championships | Grenoble, France | 2nd | |
