= Béla Bakosi =

Hungarian triple jumper

Personal information
- Born: 18 June 1957 (age 69) Kemecse, Hungary

Sport
- Sport: Track and field
Medal record
Representing Hungary
European Championships
Bronze medal – third place	1982 Athens	Triple jump
European Indoor Championships
Gold medal – first place	1980 Sindelfingen	Triple jump
Gold medal – first place	1982 Milan	Triple jump
Silver medal – second place	1988 Budapest	Triple jump
Bronze medal – third place	1983 Budapest	Triple jump
Bronze medal – third place	1984 Gothenburg	Triple jump
Bronze medal – third place	1986 Madrid	Triple jump
Summer Universiade
Silver medal – second place	1981 Bucharest	Triple jump

Béla Bakosi (born 18 June 1957) is a retired triple jumper from Hungary. He won six medals at the European Indoor Championships and a bronze medal at the 1982 European Championships in Athletics.

== Achievements ==
Year	Competition	Venue	Position	Event	Notes
Representing Hungary
1980	European Indoor Championships	Sindelfingen, West Germany	1st	Triple jump	
1980	Olympic Games	Moscow, Soviet Union	7th	Triple jump	
1982	European Indoor Championships	Milan, Italy	1st	Triple jump	
1982	European Championships	Athens, Greece	3rd	Triple jump	
1983	European Indoor Championships	Budapest, Hungary	3rd	Triple jump	
1984	European Indoor Championships	Gothenburg, Sweden	3rd	Triple jump	
1986	European Indoor Championships	Madrid, Spain	3rd	Triple jump	
1986	European Championships	Stuttgart, West Germany	12th	Triple jump	
1988	European Indoor Championships	Budapest, Hungary	2nd	Triple jump	
1988	Olympic Games	Seoul, South Korea	—	Triple jump	DNS
