= 1991 World Championships in Athletics – Men's triple jump =

These are the official results of the Men's Triple Jump event at the 1991 IAAF World Championships in Tokyo, Japan. There were a total of 38 participating athletes, with two qualifying groups and the final held on Monday August 26, 1991.

== Schedule ==
- All times are Japan Standard Time (UTC+9)

Qualification Round
Group A	Group B
25.08.1991 – 17:00h	25.08.1991 – 17:00h
Final Round
26.08.1991 – 16:40h

== Final ==
RANK	FINAL RANKING	DISTANCE
	Kenny Harrison (USA)	17.78 m
	Leonid Voloshin (URS)	17.75 m
	Mike Conley (USA)	17.62 m
4.	Vasiliy Sokov (URS)	17.28 m
5.	Tord Henriksson (SWE)	17.12 m
6.	Brian Wellman (BER)	16.98 m
7.	Yoelbi Quesada (CUB)	16.94 m
8.	Georges Sainte-Rose (FRA)	16.92 m
9.	Ralf Jaros (GER)	16.76 m
10.	Oleg Denishchik (URS)	16.61 m
11.	Norifumi Yamashita (JPN)	16.26 m
12.	Andrzej Grabarczyk (POL)	16.23 m

== Qualifying round ==
- Held on Sunday 1991-08-25 with the mark set at 17.00 metres

RANK	GROUP A	DISTANCE
1.	Vasiliy Sokov (URS)	17.16 m
2.	Yoelbi Quesada (CUB)	17.13 m
3.	Kenny Harrison (USA)	17.08 m
4.	Georges Sainte-Rose (FRA)	17.07 m
5.	Brian Wellman (BER)	17.02 m
6.	Oleg Denishchik (URS)	16.92 m
7.	Andrzej Grabarczyk (POL)	16.88 m
8.	John Herbert (GBR)	16.79 m
9.	Khristo Markov (BUL)	16.67 m
10.	Ján Čado (TCH)	16.58 m
11.	Lotfi Khaida (ALG)	16.54 m
12.	Zou Sixin (CHN)	16.35 m
13.	Marios Hadjiandreou (CYP)	16.04 m
14.	Santiago Moreno (ESP)	16.04 m
15.	Paul Nioze (SEY)	15.72 m
16.	Lucian Sfiea (ROM)	15.27 m
17.	François Reteno (GAB)	14.43 m
—	Eugene Koranteng (GHA)	NM
—	Khalid Ahmed Mousa (SUD)	DNS

RANK	GROUP B	DISTANCE
1.	Leonid Voloshin (URS)	17.29 m
2.	Tord Henriksson (SWE)	17.07 m
3.	Mike Conley (USA)	16.98 m
4.	Norifumi Yamashita (JPN)	16.88 m
5.	Ralf Jaros (GER)	16.88 m
6.	Eugeniusz Bedeniczuk (POL)	16.76 m
7.	Frank Rutherford (BAH)	16.74 m
8.	Chen Yanping (CHN)	16.70 m
9.	Edrick Floreal (CAN)	16.68 m
10.	Serge Helan (FRA)	16.51 m
11.	Pierre Camara (FRA)	16.49 m
12.	Don Parish (USA)	16.45 m
13.	Galin Georgiev (BUL)	16.18 m
14.	Anísio Silva (BRA)	16.18 m
15.	Rogel Nachum (ISR)	15.90 m
16.	Toussaint Rabenala (MAD)	15.82 m
17.	Benjamin Koech (KEN)	15.74 m
18.	Jérôme Romain (DMA)	15.49 m
19.	Lindford Castillo (BIZ)	13.93 m

== See also ==
- 1990 Men's European Championships Triple Jump
- 1992 Men's Olympic Triple Jump
- 1993 Men's World Championships Triple Jump
