= 1991 Soviet Athletics Championships =

- Dates: 10–13 July
- Host city: Kyiv
- Venue: Republican Stadium
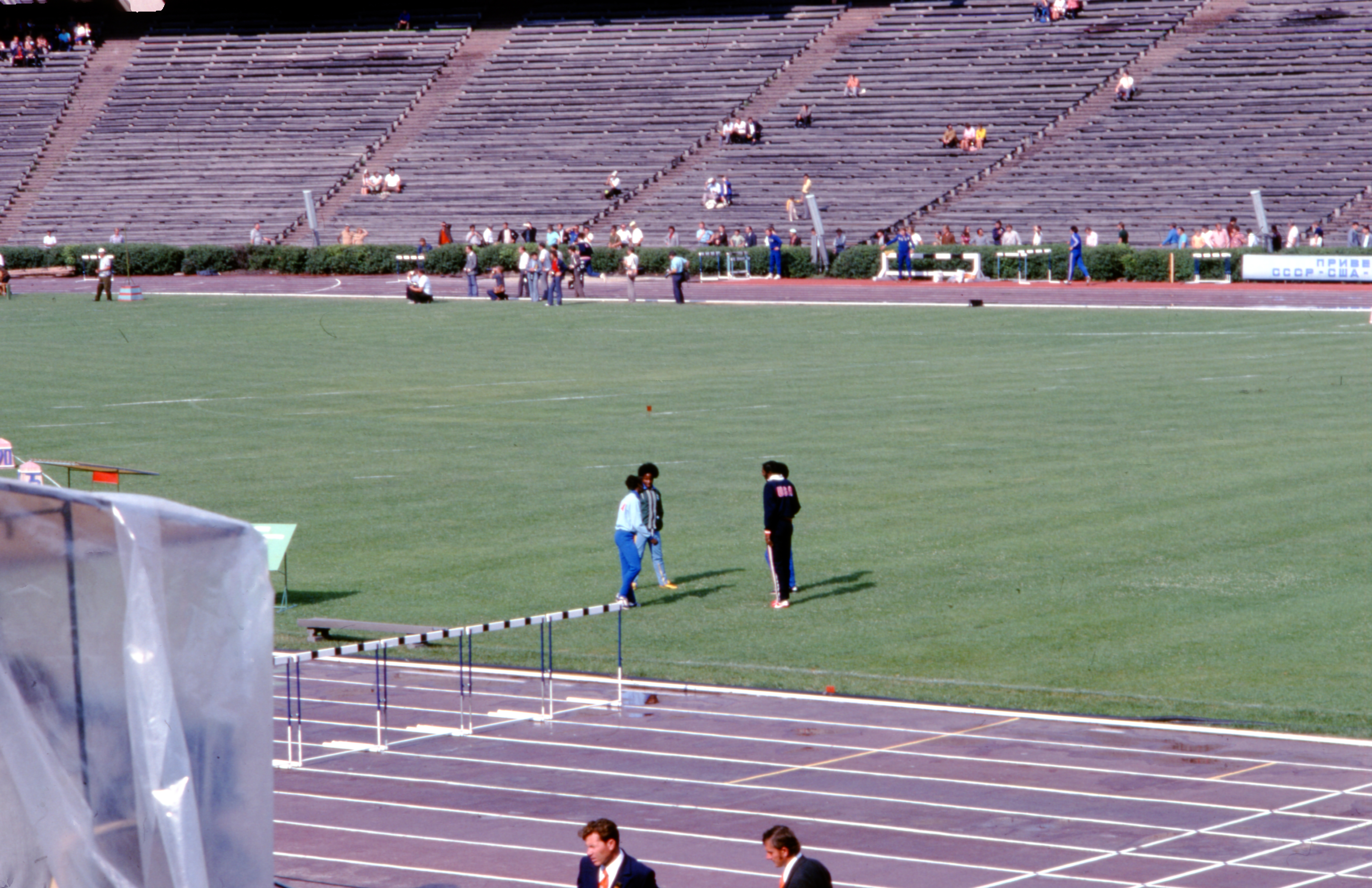
- Events: 42

The 1991 Soviet Athletics Championships was the 63rd and final edition of the national championship in outdoor track and field for the Soviet Union. It was held on 10–13 July at Republican Stadium in Kyiv, Ukrainian SSR. The competition was held within the 1991 Soviet Spartakiad. A total of 42 events were contested over four days. The marathon competition was held earlier on 21 April in Bila Tserkva.

The competition did not receive interest from several of the nation's top athletes, including Sergey Bubka, and audience attendance was also low. No team score was assigned for the Republics of the Soviet Union, as had been done in previous years. The championships formed part of the qualification for the Soviet team at the 1991 World Championships in Athletics. The highlight performance was Lyudmila Narozhilenko's Soviet national record of 12.28 seconds in the women's 100 metres hurdles. This made her the third fastest women ever in the event (after Bulgarians Yordanka Donkova and Ginka Zagorcheva) and remains one of the fastest performances of all time for the event.

This was the final Soviet Athletics Championships as the dissolution of the Soviet Union occurred in December that year. After this point, the newly independent republics began to hold their own national championships. Given the organisational disarray, the former Soviet states sent a Unified Team at the Olympics in 1992, which was selected through the 1992 CIS Athletics Championships – the last time the former Soviet countries held a united athletics event.

== Results ==
=== Men ===
Event	Gold		Silver		Bronze	
100 metres	Vitaliy Savin; Kazakh SSR Alma-Ata	10.30	Yuriy Yazynin; Kazakh SSR Alma-Ata	10.33	Oleh Kramarenko; Ukrainian SSR Zaporozhe	10.36
200 metres	Aleksandr Goremykin; Russian SFSR Kaliningrad	20.65	Dmitriy Bartenev; Moscow	21.01	Mikhail Vdovin; Russian SFSR Penza	21.18
400 metres	Dmitry Kliger; Leningrad	45.97	Vyacheslav Kocheryagin; Latvia Daugavpils	46.10	Dmitry Golovastov; Moscow	46.73
800 metres	Andrey Sudnik; Byelorussian SSR Minsk	1:45.97	Valeriy Starodubtsev; Russian SFSR Irkutsk	1:46.10	Anatoly Makarevich; Byelorussian SSR Minsk	1:46.44
1500 metres	Sergey Melnikov; Russian SFSR Rybinsk	3:40.53	Azat Rakipov; Byelorussian SSR Minsk	3:40.75	Andrey Chernokolpakov; Ukrainian SSR Kyiv	3:40.87
5000 metres	Mikhail Dasko; Leningrad	13:38.29	Farid Khayrullin; Moscow	13:45.46	Oleg Syroezhko; Ukrainian SSR Vinnitsa	13:46.28
10,000 metres	Mikhail Dasko; Leningrad	28:43.04	Sergey Sokov; Byelorussian SSR Minsk	28:48.41	Igor Sidorenko; Ukrainian SSR Kharkiv	28:59.48
3000 m chase	Ivan Konovalov; Russian SFSR Irkutsk	8:31.07	Vladimir Golyas; Russian SFSR Penza	8:33.06	Igor Konyshev; Leningrad	8:33.79
110 m hurdles	Vladimir Shishkin; Russian SFSR Nizhniy Novgorod	13.55	Gennadiy Dakshevich; Ukrainian SSR Kharkiv	13.57	Sergey Usov; Uzbek SSR Tashkent	13.60
400 m hurdles	Vladimir Budko; Byelorussian SSR Vitebsk	49.65	Nikolay Ilchenko; Tajik SSR Dushanbe	49.82	Oleh Tverdokhlib; Ukrainian SSR Dnepropetrovsk	49.84
High jump	Igor Paklin; Kirghiz SSR Bishkek	2.32 m	Serhiy Dymchenko; Ukrainian SSR Kyiv	2.32 m	Rudolf Povarnitsyn; Ukrainian SSR Kyiv	2.29 m
Pole vault	Radion Gataullin; Uzbek SSR Tashkent	5.90 m	Maksim Tarasov; Russian SFSR Yaroslavl	5.85 m	Grigoriy Yegorov; Kazakh SSR Alma-Ata	5.85 m
Long jump	Dmitry Bagryanov; Moscow	8.07 m	Vladimir Ochkan; Ukrainian SSR Poltava	8.03 m	Robert Emmiyan; Armenian SSR Kumayri	8.00 m
Triple jump	Leonid Voloshin; Russian SFSR Krasnodar	17.59 m (−0.5 m/s)	Oleg Denishchik; Byelorussian SSR Brest	17.53 m (+1.9 m/s)	Vasiliy Sokov; Tajik SSR Dushanbe	17.52 m (+1.8 m/s)
Shot put	Aleksandr Klimenko; Ukrainian SSR Kyiv	20.14 m	Sergey Smirnov; Leningrad	19.95 m	Sergey Nikolaev; Leningrad	19.87 m
Discus throw	Dmitriy Shevchenko; Russian SFSR Krasnodar	62.44 m	Sergey Lyakhov; Moscow	62.28 m	Viktor Baraznovskiy; Byelorussian SSR Minsk	61.90 m
Hammer throw	Andrey Abduvaliyev; Tajik SSR Dushanbe	82.80 m	Igor Astapkovich; Byelorussian SSR Grodno	81.78 m	Igor Nikulin; Leningrad	80.62 m
Javelin throw	Vladimir Sasimovich; Byelorussian SSR Minsk	84.46 m	Dmitry Polyunin; Uzbek SSR Tashkent	83.16 m	Vladimir Ovchinnikov; Russian SFSR Volgograd	81.26 m
Decathlon	Viktor Radchenko; Ukrainian SSR Lvov	8015 pts	Sergey Terzeman; Byelorussian SSR Minsk	7804 pts	Andrey Chernyavskiy; Russian SFSR Novosibirsk	7721 pts
20 km walk	Yevgeniy Misyulya; Byelorussian SSR Minsk	1:19:13	Artur Shumak; Byelorussian SSR Minsk	1:20:10	Vladimir Druchik; Ukrainian SSR Lutsk	1:20:48
50 km walk	Vitaliy Popovich; Ukrainian SSR Brovary	3:44:01	Andrey Plotnikov; Russian SFSR Vladimir	3:48:43	Valeriy Spitsyn; Chelyabinsk	3:50:18
4 × 100 m relay	Byelorussian SSR; Andrey Cherkashin; Leonid Safronnikov; Aleksandr Starovoytov; Aleksandr Knysh	39.44	Russian SFSR; Boris Zhgir; Aleksey Podshibyakin; Mikhail Vdovin; Pavel Galkin	39.47	Ukrainian SSR; Aleksandr Naduda; Oleh Kramarenko; Dmitriy Vanyaikin; Igor Streltsov	39.61
4 × 400 m relay	Moscow; Andrey Platonov; Maksim Kupriyanov; Vladimir Popov; Dmitry Golovastov	3:06.00	Russian SFSR; Aleksandr Belikov; Valeriy Belov; Petr Khanzhin; Valeriy Starodubtsev	3:07.12	Leningrad; Dmitriy Rebenko; Aleksandr Bagaev; Roman Roslavtsev; Aleksandr Minakov	3:08.12

=== Women ===
Event	Gold		Silver		Bronze	
100 metres	Galina Malchugina; Russian SFSR Bryansk	11.20	Irina Slyusar; Ukrainian SSR Dnepropetrovsk	11.26	Natalya Kovtun; Russian SFSR Tula	11.32
200 metres	Yelena Vinogradova; Russian SFSR Moscow Oblast	22.71	Tatyana Alekseyeva; Russian SFSR Novosibirsk	22.71	Marina Trandenkova; Leningrad	23.19
400 metres	Olha Bryzhina; Ukrainian SSR Lugansk	51.11	Olga Nazarova; Moscow	51.50	Lyudmila Dzhigalova; Ukrainian SSR Kharkiv	51.50
800 metres	Svetlana Masterkova; Moscow	1:57.23	Liliya Nurutdinova; Russian SFSR Naberezhnye Chelny	1:58.27	Inna Yevseyeva; Ukrainian SSR Zhitomir	1:58.30
1500 metres	Tetyana Dorovskikh; Ukrainian SSR Zaporozhe	4:05.60	Ravilya Kotovich; Byelorussian SSR Minsk	4:06.34	Oksana Mernikova; Byelorussian SSR Grodno	4:06.40
3000 metres	Lyudmila Borisova; Leningrad	8:57.87	Tetyana Dorovskikh; Ukrainian SSR Zaporozhe	8:58.24	Tatyana Pozdnyakova; Ukrainian SSR Vinnitsa	8:59.30
10,000 metres	Tatyana Pozdnyakova; Ukrainian SSR Vinnitsa	33:07.62	Marina Rodchenkova; Moscow	33:09.54	Lyudmila Matveyeva; Russian SFSR Ufa	33:09.74
100 m hurdles	Lyudmila Narozhilenko; Russian SFSR Krasnodar	12.28	Nataliya Grygoryeva; Ukrainian SSR Kharkiv	12.39	Nadiya Bodrova; Ukrainian SSR Kharkiv	12.81
400 m hurdles	Anna Chuprina; Moscow	55.12	Natalya Ignatyuk; Byelorussian SSR Minsk	55.28	Vera Ordina; Leningrad	55.31
High jump	Yelena Rodina; Moscow	1.96 m	Tamara Bykova; Moscow	1.94 m	Olga Bolșova; Moldavian SSR Kishinev	1.92 m
Long jump	Yelena Sinchukova; Moscow	7.16 m (+1.3 m/s)	Larysa Berezhna; Ukrainian SSR Kyiv	7.10 m (+0.3 m/s)	Olena Khlopotnova; Ukrainian SSR Kharkiv	6.88 m (+3.1 m/s)
Triple jump	Inessa Kravets; Ukrainian SSR Kyiv	14.40 m (+0.4 m/s)	Elena Semiraz; Ukrainian SSR Ternopol	14.35 m (+0.5 m/s)	Inna Lasovskaya; Moscow	14.05 m (+0.9 m/s)
Shot put	Svetlana Krivelyova; Moscow	20.36 m	Marina Antonyuk; Russian SFSR Perm	18.89 m	Valentina Fedyushina; Ukrainian SSR Simferopol	18.89 m
Discus throw	Larisa Mikhalchenko; Ukrainian SSR Kharkiv	65.30 m	Iryna Yatchenko; Byelorussian SSR Grodno	64.60 m	Ellina Zvereva; Byelorussian SSR Minsk	63.80 m
Javelin throw	Natalya Shikolenko; Byelorussian SSR Minsk	66.52 m	Natalya Cherniyenko; Ukrainian SSR Kharkiv	64.64 m	Irina Kostyuchenkova; Ukrainian SSR Kharkiv	64.42 m
Heptathlon	Viktoriya Babiy; Ukrainian SSR Zaporozhe	6174 pts	Marina Scherbina; Ukrainian SSR Kyiv Oblast	6116 pts	Svetlana Buraga; Byelorussian SSR Minsk	6104 pts
10 km walk	Alina Ivanova; Russian SFSR Cheboksary	42:50	Yelena Nikolayeva; Russian SFSR Cheboksary	43:25	Tamara Kovalenko; Russian SFSR Yaroslavl	43:54
4 × 100 m relay	Russian SFSR; Nadezhda Roschupkina; Galina Malchugina; Marina Zhirova; Natalya Kovtun	43.30	Ukrainian SSR; Zhanna Tarnopolskaya; Elena Nasonkina; Irina Slyusar; Anzhelika Shevchuk	43.81	Kazakh SSR; Olga Kvast; Irina Chernova; Elena Gorbenko; Olga Dudnik	44.85
4 × 400 m relay	Ukrainian SSR; Aelita Yurchenko; Inna Yevseyeva; Lyudmila Dzhigalova; Olha Bryzhina	3:24.65	Russian SFSR; Galina Moskvina; Liliya Nurutdinova; Yelena Ruzina; Tatyana Alekseyeva	3:25.14	Moscow; Marina Khripankova; Elena Didilenko; Yelena Golesheva; Olga Nazarova	3:28.41

== Soviet Marathon Championships ==
The Soviet Marathon Championships and Spartakiade Marathon took part within the same race on 21 April in the city of Bila Tserkva, though placings differed for men as under Spartakiade rules each Republic of the Soviet Union could enter a maximum of three athletes for their team. The top two placers in the men's race, Vladimir Bukhanov and Vadim Sidorov, were not part of a republic's team, hence they were declared first and second in the Soviet Championships, but the Spartakiade title went to the third placer, Aleksandr Vychuzhanin of the Russian SFSR. The level of participation was not as high in the women's race, thus the top three women were all part of a team and the Championships and Spartakiade results were identical.

=== Men ===
Event	Gold		Silver		Bronze	
Soviet Championships
Marathon	Vladimir Bukhanov; Ukrainian SSR Odessa	2:13:46	Vadim Sidorov; Russian SFSR Nizhniy Novgorod	2:13:49	Aleksandr Vychuzhanin; Russian SFSR Voronezh	2:13:50
Spartakiade
Marathon	Aleksandr Vychuzhanin; Russian SFSR Voronezh	2:13:50	Sergey Klimakov; Russian SFSR Kemerovo	2:13:52	Viktor Vykhristenko; Ukrainian SSR Belaya Tserkov	2:13:57

=== Women ===
Event	Gold		Silver		Bronze	
Marathon	Madina Biktagirova; Belarusian SSR Brest	2:32:02	Elena Semenova; Ukrainian SSR Zaporozhe	2:33:13	Irina Pushko; Belarusian SSR Soligorsk	2:33:44

== Soviet Winter Racewalking Championships ==
The Soviet Winter Racewalking Championships were held 16–17 February in Sochi. Participants competed on the route laid along Tchaikovsky Street. The women's 10 km winner Alina Ivanova finished one second slower than her Soviet record set in 1989.

=== Men ===
Event	Gold		Silver		Bronze	
20 km walk	Aleksandr Pershin; Russian SFSR Samara	1:18:58	Frants Kostyukevich; Belarusian SSR Minsk	1:19:05	Vladimir Andreyev; Russian SFSR Cheboksary	1:19:17
30 km walk	Aleksandr Potashov; Belarusian SSR Vitebsk	2:05:15	Valeriy Spitsyn; Russian SFSR Chelyabinsk	2:05:17	Anatoliy Grigorev; Russian SFSR Cheboksary	2:06:25

=== Women ===
Event	Gold		Silver		Bronze	
10 km walk	Alina Ivanova; Russian SFSR Cheboksary	42:17	Yelena Sayko; Russian SFSR Chelyabinsk	42:29	Irina Strakhova; Russian SFSR Novosibirsk	42:44

== Soviet Winter Throwing Championships ==
The Soviet Winter Throwing Championships were held on 23–24 February in Adler at the Labor Reserves stadium. The women's hammer throw world record was improved twice at the meeting, first by Larisa Shtyrogrishnaya (63.08 m), and then by Alla Fyodorova (64.44 m).

=== Men ===
Event	Gold		Silver		Bronze	
Discus throw	Volodymyr Zinchenko; Ukrainian SSR Zaporozhe	64.64 m				
Hammer throw	Igor Astapkovich; Belarusian SSR Grodno	80.78 m	Igor Nikulin; Leningrad	79.14 m		
Javelin throw	Yuriy Rybin; Russian SFSR Lipetsk	84.54 m	Viktor Zaytsev; Uzbek SSR Tashkent	84.02 m	Andrey Maznichenko; Ukrainian SSR Kyiv	83.92 m

=== Women ===
Event	Gold		Silver		Bronze
Discus throw					
Hammer throw	Alla Fedorova; Kirgiz SSR Bishkek	64.44 m	Larisa Shtyrogrishnaya; Tajik SSR Dushanbe	63.08 m	
Javelin throw	Natalya Shikolenko; Belarusian SSR Minsk	62.62 m			

== Soviet Cross Country Championships ==
The Soviet Cross Country Championships were held on 24 February in Kislovodsk, Russian SFSR.

=== Men ===
Event	Gold		Silver		Bronze	
12 km	Gennadiy Temnikov; Russian SFSR Ulan-Ude	38:31	Petr Sarafenyuk; Ukrainian SSR Kyiv	38:32	Viktor Gural; Ukrainian SSR Lvov	38:40

=== Women ===
Event	Gold		Silver		Bronze	
5 km	Natalya Solominskaya; Russian SFSR Ulan-Ude	17:11	Marina Rodchenkova; Moscow	17:13	Nadezhda Tatarenkova; Russian SFSR Abakan	17:16
