= 1993 World Championships in Athletics – Men's triple jump =

These are the official results of the Men's Triple Jump event at the 1993 IAAF World Championships in Stuttgart, Germany. There were a total number of 46 participating athletes, with two qualifying groups and the final held on Monday 1993-08-16.

== Final ==
| RANK | FINAL RANKING | DISTANCE |
|---|---|---|
| | Mike Conley (USA) | 17.86 m |
| | Leonid Voloshin (RUS) | 17.65 m |
| | Jonathan Edwards (GBR) | 17.44 m |
| 4. | Ralf Jaros (GER) | 17.34 m |
| 5. | Pierre Camara (FRA) | 17.28 m |
| 6. | Denis Kapustin (RUS) | 17.19 m |
| 7. | Anísio Silva (BRA) | 17.19 m |
| 8. | Brian Wellman (BER) | 17.12 m |
| 9. | Serge Hélan (FRA) | 17.09 m |
| 10. | Kenny Harrison (USA) | 17.06 m |
| 11. | Jérôme Romain (DMA) | 16.98 m |
| 12. | Yoelbi Quesada (CUB) | 16.77 m |
| 13. | Oleg Denishchik (BLR) | 16.61 m |

== Qualifying round ==
- Held on Sunday 1993-08-15 with the mark set at 17.10 metres (4 + 9 athletes)

| RANK | GROUP A | DISTANCE |
|---|---|---|
| 1. | Ralf Jaros (GER) | 17.18 m |
| 2. | Anísio Silva (BRA) | 17.05 m |
| 3. | Yoelbi Quesada (CUB) | 17.02 m |
| 4. | Jonathan Edwards (GBR) | 16.98 m |
| 5. | Serge Hélan (FRA) | 16.97 m |
| 6. | Kenny Harrison (USA) | 16.95 m |
| 7. | Rogel Nachum (ISR) | 16.86 m |
| 8. | Vasiliy Sokov (RUS) | 16.85 m |
| 9. | Reggie Jones (USA) | 16.83 m |
| 10. | Toussaint Rabenala (MAD) | 16.81 m |
| 11. | Francis Agyepong (GBR) | 16.46 m |
| 12. | Parkev Grigoryan (ARM) | 16.35 m |
| 13. | Volker Mai (GER) | 16.33 m |
| 14. | Zsolt Czingler (HUN) | 16.32 m |
| 15. | Audrius Raizgys (LTU) | 16.05 m |
| 16. | Marzouk Abdallah Al-Yoha (KUW) | 16.04 m |
| 17. | Igor Lapshin (BLR) | 15.99 m |
| 18. | Park Min-Soo (KOR) | 15.93 m |
| 19. | Frank Rutherford (BAH) | 15.86 m |
| 20. | Lotfi Khaida (ALG) | 15.77 m |
| 21. | Tord Henriksson (SWE) | 15.67 m |
| 22. | Sergey Arzamasov (KAZ) | 15.40 m |
| — | Olive Fifita (TGA) | NM |

| RANK | GROUP B | DISTANCE |
|---|---|---|
| 1. | Mike Conley (USA) | 17.39 m |
| 2. | Leonid Voloshin (RUS) | 17.34 m |
| 3. | Pierre Camara (FRA) | 17.19 m |
| 4. | Denis Kapustin (RUS) | 17.09 m |
| 5. | Oleg Denishchik (BLR) | 16.88 m |
| 6. | Brian Wellman (BER) | 16.87 m |
| 7. | Jérôme Romain (DMA) | 16.87 m |
| 8. | Māris Bružiks (LAT) | 16.85 m |
| 9. | Georges Sainte-Rose (FRA) | 16.84 m |
| 10. | Edrick Floreal (CAN) | 16.84 m |
| 11. | Volodymyr Inozemtsev (UKR) | 16.84 m |
| 12. | Daniel Osorio (CUB) | 16.78 m |
| 13. | Tosi Fasinro (GBR) | 16.71 m |
| 14. | Oleg Sakirkin (KAZ) | 16.64 m |
| 15. | Milan Mikulas (CZE) | 16.59 m |
| 16. | Armen Martirosyan (ARM) | 16.50 m |
| 17. | Vasif Asadov (AZE) | 16.43 m |
| 18. | Karsten Richter (GER) | 16.13 m |
| 19. | Khristo Markov (BUL) | 16.11 m |
| 20. | Gyula Pálóczi (HUN) | 15.89 m |
| 21. | Banaras Khan (PAK) | 15.46 m |
| — | Zou Sixin (CHN) | NM |
| — | Sergio Saavedra (VEN) | DNS |

== See also ==
- 1991 Men's World Championships Triple Jump
- 1992 Men's Olympic Triple Jump
- 1995 Men's World Championships Triple Jump
