= 1992 CIS Indoor Athletics Championships =

- Dates: 1–2 February
- Host city: Moscow, Russia
- Venue: CSKA Palace of Sports
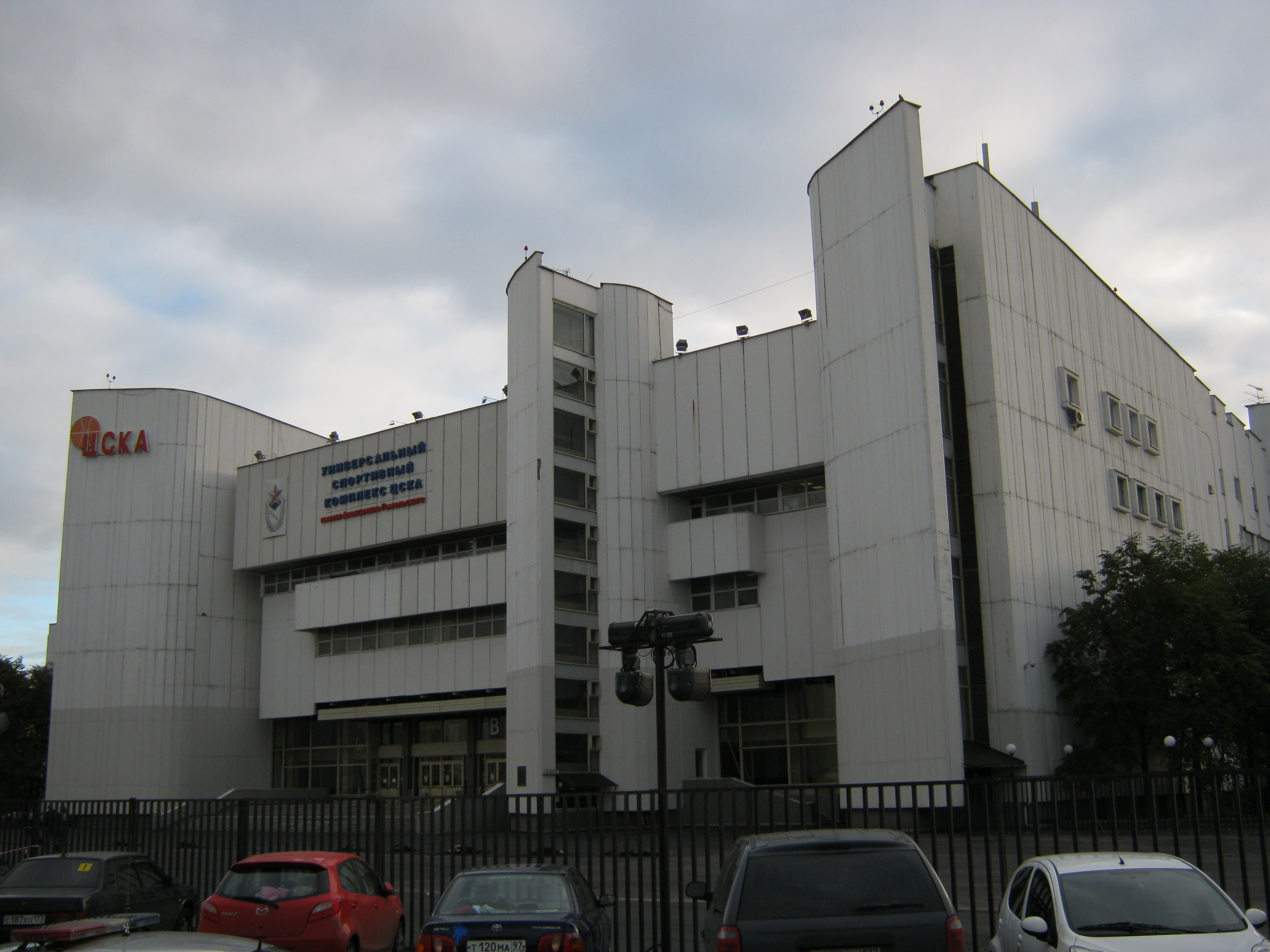
- Events: 37

The 1992 CIS Indoor Athletics Championships was an international outdoor track and field competition for athletes from countries within the Commonwealth of Independent States. It was held on 1–2 February at CSKA Palace of Sports in Moscow, Russia. A total of 29 events were contested over two days. Women competed in the steeplechase for the first time. Highlights included an Asian record of 6.51 seconds by Vitaliy Savin in the men's 60 metres.

This was the only time the competition was held, precipitated by the dissolution of the Soviet Union in 1991 and the need to select athletes for the unified team at the 1992 European Athletics Indoor Championships. After 1992, the former Soviet states each sent their own national teams and held their own national championships. The indoor CIS competition was followed later that year by the outdoor 1992 CIS Athletics Championships, which served as the selection meet for the Unified Team at the 1992 Summer Olympics.

The men's heptathlon and women's pentathlon were held separately from the main competition, taking place in Saint Petersburg the following week.

== Results ==
=== Men ===
Event	Gold		Silver		Bronze	
60 metres	Vitaliy Savin; Kazakhstan Alma-Ata	6.51 AR	Oleh Kramarenko; Ukraine Zaporizhzhia	6.67	Anvar Kuchmuradov; Uzbekistan Tashkent	6.68
200 metres	Aleksandr Goremykin; Russia Kaliningrad	20.89	Igor Streltsov; Ukraine Zaporizhzhia	21.15	Andrey Fedoriv; Russia Moscow	21.17
400 metres	Aleksandr Bagayev; Russia Saint Petersburg	47.58	Dmitry Golovastov; Russia Moscow	47.72	Dmitry Kliger; Russia Saint Petersburg	47.91
800 metres	Andrey Sudnik; Belarus Minsk	1:48.44	Vladimir Graudyn; Russia Moscow	1:48.68	Valeriy Starodubtsev; Russia Irkutsk	1:49.29
1000 metres	Ivan Komar; Belarus Minsk	2:22.39	Aleksandr Saltanov; Kyrgyzstan Bishkek	2:23.71	Pavel Dolgushev; Russia Moscow	2:23.84
1500 metres	Sergey Melnikov; Russia Rybinsk	3:43.10	Andrey Loginov; Russia Moscow	3:44.29	Ivan Komar; Belarus Minsk	3:44.66
3000 metres	Farit Gaptullin; Russia Yoshkar-Ola	8:03.67	Vyacheslav Shabunin; Russia Moscow	8:03.77	Ivan Konovalov; Russia Irkutsk	8:07.82
3000 m s'chase	Aleksey Patserin; Ukraine Dnipropetrovsk	8:29.26	Vladimir Golyas; Russia Penza	8:29.31	Dmitriy Ryzhukhin; Russia Nizhniy Novgorod	8:33.64
60 m hurdles	Aleksandr Markin; Russia Moscow	7.67	Vadim Kurach; Russia Saint Petersburg	7.68	Mikhail Edel; Russia Moscow	7.73
High jump	Oleg Zhukovskiy; Belarus Minsk	2.20 m	Konstantin Galkin; Russia Saint Petersburg	2.20 m	Normund Sietins; Latvia Ogre	2.20 m
Pole vault	Petr Bochkarev; Russia Moscow	5.75 m	Konstantin Semyonov; Uzbekistan Tashkent	5.70 m	Igor Trandenkov; Russia Saint Petersburg	5.70 m
Long jump	Dmitry Bagryanov; Russia Moscow	8.16 m	Vitaliy Kyrylenko; Ukraine Kharkiv	7.97 m	Yevgeniy Semenyuk; Ukraine Kyiv	7.80 m
Triple jump	Vasiliy Sokov; Tajikistan Dushanbe	17.30 m	Sergey Arzamasov; Kazakhstan Chimkent	16.87 m	Oleg Sakirkin; Kazakhstan Chimkent	16.82 m
Shot put	Oleksandr Bagach; Ukraine Brovary	20.92 m	Aleksandr Klimenko; Ukraine Kyiv	20.45 m	Sergey Smirnov; Russia Saint Petersburg	20.00 m
5000 m walk	Grigoriy Kornev; Russia Kemerovo	18:23.10	Frants Kostyukevich; Belarus Minsk	18:30.87	Mikhail Orlov; Russia Yaroslavl	18:32.32

=== Women ===
Event	Gold		Silver		Bronze	
60 metres	Zhanna Tarnopolskaya; Ukraine Kyiv	7.17	Nadezhda Roshchupkina; Russia Tula	7.21	Anzhelika Shevchuk; Ukraine Donetsk	7.22
200 metres	Oksana Stepicheva; Russia Barnaul	23.34	Natalya Voronova; Russia Moscow	23.37	Tatyana Alekseyeva; Russia Novosibirsk	23.65
400 metres	Marina Shmonina; Uzbekistan Tashkent	52.24	Yelena Golesheva; Russia Moscow	52.78	Yelena Ruzina; Russia Voronezh	53.15
800 metres	Inna Yevseyeva; Ukraine Zhytomyr	1:57.23	Yelena Afanasyeva; Russia Moscow Oblast	2:01.39	Galina Reznikova; Russia Moscow	2:02.08
1000 metres	Yelena Afanasyeva; Russia Moscow Oblast	2:42.59	Yelena Storchovaya; Ukraine Kyiv	2:42.85	Olga Nelyubova; Russia Moscow Oblast	2:42.94
1500 metres	Yekaterina Podkopayeva; Russia Moscow Oblast	4:14.18	Natalya Betekhtina; Russia Yekaterinburg	4:14.28	Vera Chuvashova; Russia Kurgan	4:15.15
3000 metres	Anita Klapote; Latvia Riga	9:04.22	Lyudmila Vasilyeva; Russia Vladivostok	9:06.09	Yekaterina Podkopayeva; Russia Moscow Oblast	9:10.93
2000 m s'chase	Olga Stefanishina; Ukraine Ternopil	6:14.25	Lyudmila Pushkina; Ukraine Kherson	6:22.37	Antonina Andronakiy; Moldova Chișinău	6:28.06
60 m hurdles	Zhanna Gurbanova; Belarus Minsk	8.07	Elena Sinyutina; Russia Saint Petersburg	8.12	Marina Slushkina; Russia Krasnoyarsk	8.20
High jump	Yelena Yelesina; Russia Chelyabinsk	1.92 m	Inha Babakova; Ukraine Mykolaiv	1.90 m	Elena Gribanova; Russia Moscow Oblast	1.90 m
Long jump	Inessa Kravets; Ukraine Kyiv	7.09 m	Larysa Berezhna; Ukraine Kyiv	7.08 m	Yolanda Chen; Russia Moscow	6.65 m
Triple jump	Natalya Kayukova; Russia Khabarovsk	13.76 m	Zhanna Gureyeva; Belarus Minsk	13.73 m	Svetlana Davydova; Russia Samara	13.70 m
Shot put	Anna Romanova; Russia Bryansk	19.98 m	Svetlana Krivelyova; Russia Moscow Oblast	19.82 m	Valentina Fedyushina; Ukraine Simferopol	19.52 m
3000 m walk	Alina Ivanova; Russia Cheboksary	11:57.11	Yelena Sayko; Russia Chelyabinsk	12:08.47	Rimma Makarova; Russia Saint Petersburg	12:21.63

== CIS Indoor Combined Events Championships ==
The CIS Indoor Combined Events Championships was held on 8–9 February in Saint Petersburg at the Winter Stadium.

=== Men ===
Event	Gold		Silver		Bronze	
Heptathlon	Lev Lobodin; Ukraine Luhansk	5918 pts	Vitaliy Kolpakov; Ukraine Luhansk	5800 pts	Ramil Ganiyev; Uzbekistan Tashkent	5791 pts

=== Women ===
Event	Gold		Silver		Bronze	
Pentathlon	Svetlana Buraga; Belarus Minsk	4614 pts	Irina Tyukhay; Russia Krasnoyarsk	4561 pts	Irina Matyusheva; Ukraine Kyiv	4526 pts

== Unified team selection ==
=== Men ===
- 60 m: Vitaliy Savin, Oleh Kramarenko
- 200 m: Aleksandr Goremykin
- 800 m: Anatoly Makarevich
- 1500 m: Sergey Melnikov
- 60 m hurdles: Aleksandr Markin
- High jump: Aleksey Yemelin
- Pole vault: Petr Bochkarev, Konstantin Semenov
- Long jump: Dmitry Bagryanov, Vitaliy Kyrylenko
- Triple jump: Leonid Voloshin, Vasiliy Sokov
- Shot put: Oleksandr Bagach, Aleksandr Klimenko
- Heptathlon: Lev Lobodin, Vitaliy Kolpakov
- 5000 m walk: Grigory Kornev, Frants Kostyukevich

=== Women ===
- 60 m: Zhanna Tarnopolskaya, Nadezhda Roshchupkina
- 200 m: Oksana Stepicheva, Natalya Voronova
- 400 m: Olha Bryzhina, Marina Shmonina, Yelena Golesheva
- 800 m: Inna Yevseyeva, Yelena Afanasyeva
- 1500 m: Yekaterina Podkopayeva, Lyubov Kremleva
- 3000 m: Tetyana Dorovskikh, Olena Vyazova
- 60 m hurdles: Lyudmila Narozhilenko
- High jump: Yelena Yelesina
- Long jump: Inessa Kravets, Larysa Berezhna
- Triple jump: Inessa Kravets
- Shot put: Natalya Lisovskaya, Anna Romanova
- Pentathlon: Irina Belova, Tatyana Blokhina
- 3000 m walk: Alina Ivanova, Yelena Sayko

== See also ==
- 1992 Russian Indoor Athletics Championships
