= 1992 CIS Athletics Championships =

1992 cos athletics championships

- Dates: 22–24 June
- Host city: Moscow, Russia
- Venue: Lokomotiv Stadium
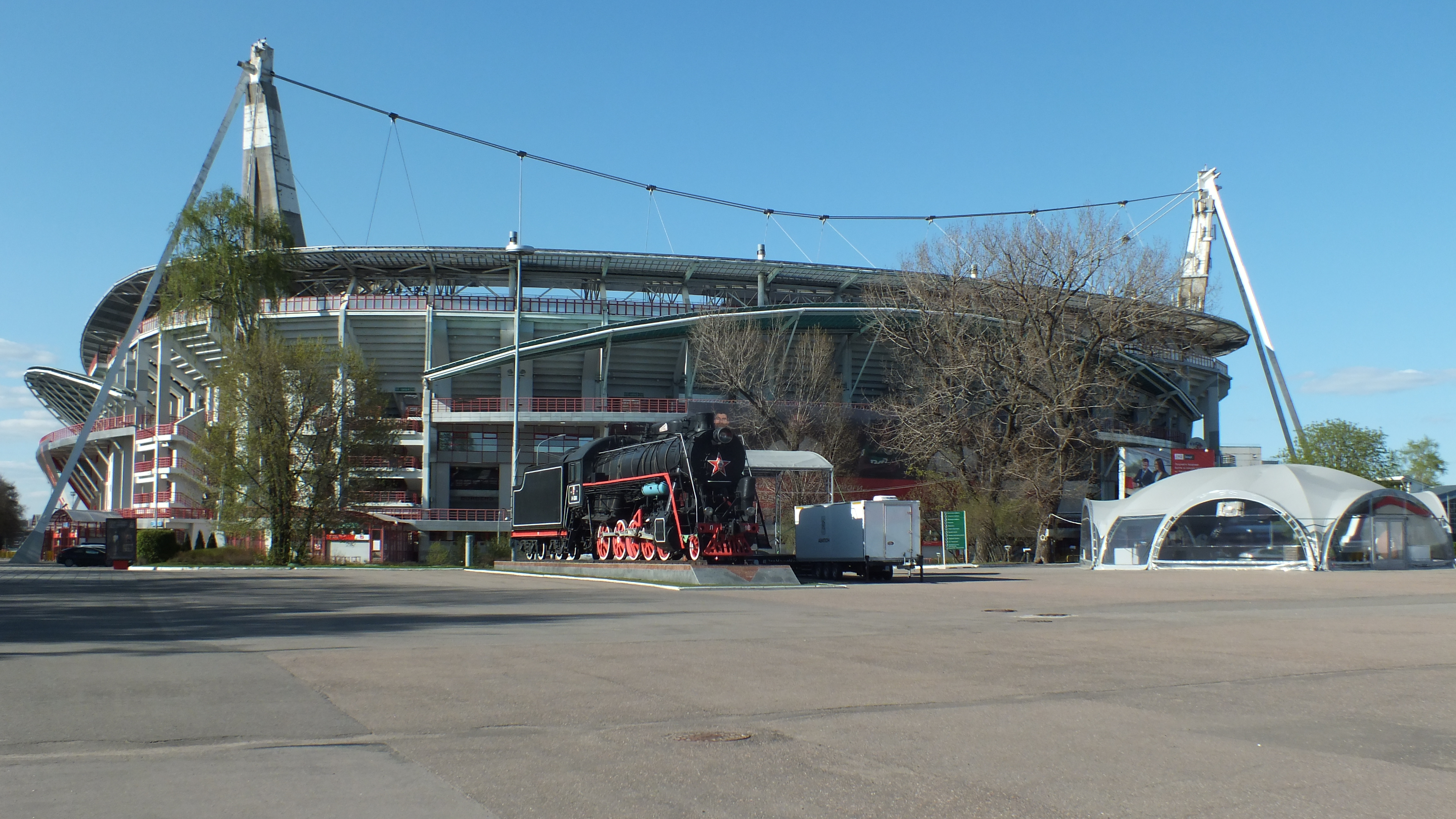
- Events: 37

The 1992 CIS Athletics Championships was an international outdoor track and field competition for athletes from countries within the Commonwealth of Independent States. It was held on 22–24 June at Lokomotiv Stadium in Moscow, Russia. A total of 37 events were contested over three days.

This was the only time the competition was held, precipitated by the dissolution of the Soviet Union in 1991 and the need to select athletes for the Unified Team at the 1992 Summer Olympics. After 1992, the former Soviet states each sent their own national teams and held their own national championships. The outdoor CIS competition followed the 1992 CIS Indoor Athletics Championships, which had served as the unified team selection meet for the 1992 European Athletics Indoor Championships.

There was no team aspect to the championships, thus relay races were not held. CIS competitions for racewalking, throwing and cross country running were held separately. The CIS Cross Country Championships was used to select the CIS team for the 1992 IAAF World Cross Country Championships. Highlights included a Russian national record of 10.82 seconds by Irina Privalova in the women's 100 metres and a Belarusian record 70.36 m by Natalya Shikolenko in the women's javelin throw.

== Championships ==
- 1 February - CIS Cross Country Championships (Kislovodsk)
- 21–23 February - CIS Winter Throwing Championships (Adler)
- 22 February - CIS Winter Race Walking Championships (Sochi)
- 25 April - CIS 50 Kilometres Race Walking Championship (Moscow)
- 30 May - CIS Race Walking Championships (Moscow)
- 22–24 June – CIS Athletics Championships (Moscow)

== Results ==
=== Men ===
| Event | Gold | | Silver | | Bronze | |
|---|---|---|---|---|---|---|
| 100 metres (wind: +2.7 m/s) | Vitaliy Savin; Kazakhstan Alma-Ata | 9.94w | Pavel Galkin; Russia Samara | 10.12w | Andrey Fedoriv; Russia Moscow | 10.27w |
| 200 metres | Edvin Ivanov; Russia Moscow | 20.52 | Igor Streltsov; Ukraine Zaporizhia | 20.71 | Mikhail Vdovin; Russia Penza | 20.90 |
| 400 metres | Dmitry Kosov; Russia Vladivostok | 45.97 | Dmitry Kliger; Russia Saint Petersburg | 46.09 | Dmitry Golovastov; Russia Moscow | 46.22 |
| 800 metres | Aleksey Oleynikov; Russia Stavropol | 1:50.54 | Sergey Kamayev; Turkmenistan Ashkhabad | 1:50.61 | Oleg Stepanov; Russia Kurgan | 1:50.88 |
| 1500 metres | Andrey Chernokolpakov; Ukraine Kyiv | 3:43.77 | Farit Gaptullin; Russia Yoshkar-Ola | 3:43.98 | ? | 3:44.61 |
| 5000 metres | Andrey Tikhonov; Russia Kemerovo | 13:38.49 | Farid Khayrullin; Russia Moscow | 13:39.04 | Oleg Strizhakov; Russia Voronezh | 13:41.18 |
| 10,000 metres | Mikhail Khramov; Russia Saransk | 28:55.38 | Vladimir Gusev; Kazakhstan Alma-Ata | 29:07.20 | Petro Sarafyniuk; Ukraine Kyiv | 29:32.17 |
| 3000 m s'chase | Ivan Konovalov; Russia Irkutsk | 8:36.81 | Vladimir Golyas; Russia Penza | 8:38.15 | Vladimir Pronin; Russia Moscow | 8:39.50 |
| 110 m hurdles | Sergey Usov; Uzbekistan Tashkent | 13.34 | Vladimir Shishkin; Russia Nizhniy Novgorod | 13.46 | Vadim Kurach; Russia Saint Petersburg | 13.47 |
| 400 m hurdles | Vadim Zadoinov; Moldova Kishinev | 49.82 | Oleh Tverdokhlib; Ukraine Dnipropetrovsk | 50.51 | Nikolay Ilchenko; Tajikistan Dushanbe | 50.53 |
| High jump | Igor Paklin; Kyrgyzstan Bishkek | 2.28 m | Aleksey Yemelin; Russia Moscow | 2.25 m | Yuriy Sergiyenko; Ukraine Mykolaiv | 2.20 m |
| Pole vault | Maksim Tarasov; Russia Yaroslavl | 5.90 m | Igor Trandenkov; Russia Saint Petersburg | 5.85 m | Sergey Bubka; Ukraine Donetsk | 5.80 m |
| Long jump | Dmitry Bagryanov; Russia Moscow | 8.27 m (+2.0 m/s) | Vadim Ivanov; Russia Kaluga | 8.03 m (+2.5 m/s) | Sergey Layevskiy; Ukraine Dnipropetrovsk | 7.97 m (+2.6 m/s) |
| Triple jump | Aleksandr Kovalenko; Russia Moscow | 17.32 m (−0.6 m/s) | Leonid Voloshin; Russia Krasnodar | 17.27 m (−1.0 m/s) | Vasiliy Sokov; Tajikistan Dushanbe | 17.06 m (+0.2 m/s) |
| Shot put | Andriy Nemchaninov; Ukraine Kyiv | 20.60 m | Vyacheslav Lykho; Russia Moscow Oblast | 20.51 m | Aleksandr Klimenko; Ukraine Kyiv | 20.49 m |
| Discus throw | Volodymyr Zinchenko; Ukraine Zaporizhia | 65.90 m | Dmitry Shevchenko; Russia Krasnodar | 64.16 m | Dmitry Kovtsun; Ukraine Kyiv | 63.72 m |
| Hammer throw | Igor Astapkovich; Belarus Grodno | 83.14 m | Andrey Abduvaliyev; Tajikistan Dushanbe | 81.98 m | Igor Nikulin; Russia Saint Petersburg | 81.36 m |
| Javelin throw | Viktor Zaytsev; Uzbekistan Tashkent | 87.20 m | Dmitry Polyunin; Uzbekistan Tashkent | 85.74 m | Andrey Shevchuk; Russia Volgograd | 81.76 m |
| Decathlon | Eduard Khyamyalyaynen; Belarus Grodno | 8194 pts | Ramil Ganiyev; Uzbekistan Tashkent | 8130 pts | Viktor Radchenko; Ukraine Lviv | 8056 pts |

=== Women ===
| Event | Gold | | Silver | | Bronze | |
|---|---|---|---|---|---|---|
| 100 metres | Irina Privalova; Russia Moscow | 10.82 NR | Galina Malchugina; Russia Bryansk | 10.96 | Olga Bogoslovskaya; Russia Moscow | 11.07 |
| 200 metres | Irina Privalova; Russia Moscow | 22.14 | Marina Trandenkova; Russia Saint Petersburg | 22.73 | Oksana Stepicheva; Russia Barnaul | 23.03 |
| 400 metres | Olga Nazarova; Russia Moscow | 50.29 | Olha Bryzhina; Ukraine Luhansk | 50.45 | Yelena Ruzina; Russia Voronezh | 50.78 |
| 800 metres | Lyudmila Rogachova; Russia Stavropol | 1:57.93 | Elena Zavadskaya; Ukraine Donetsk | 1:59.36 | ? | 1:59.54 |
| 1500 metres | Natalya Artyomova; Russia Saint Petersburg | 4:05.73 | Lyudmila Borisova; Russia Saint Petersburg | 4:10.33 | Natalya Betekhtina; Russia Ekaterinburg | 4:11.58 |
| 3000 metres | Olga Churbanova; Russia Ekaterinburg | 8:58.03 | Tamara Koba; Ukraine Dnipropetrovsk | 9:04.08 | Zoya Kaznovskaya; Ukraine Zaporozhe | 9:05.21 |
| 10,000 metres | Olena Vyazova; Ukraine Kharkiv | 32:09.87 | Olga Bondarenko; Russia Volgograd | 32:10.10 | Lyudmila Matveyeva; Russia Ufa | 32:10.84 |
| 2000 m s'chase | Svetlana Rogova; Russia Nalchik | 6:19.46 | Lyudmila Pushkina; Ukraine Kherson | 6:21.16 | Lyudmila Kuropatkina; Russia Yaroslavl | 6:24.71 |
| 100 m hurdles | Marina Azyabina; Russia Izhevsk | 12.76 | Nataliya Grygoryeva; Ukraine Kharkiv | 12.78 | Nataliya Kolovanova; Ukraine Kharkiv | 12.81 |
| 400 m hurdles | Margarita Ponomaryova; Russia Saint Petersburg | 54.03 | Vera Ordina; Russia Saint Petersburg | 54.55 | Natalya Torshina; Kazakhstan Alma-Ata | 55.43 |
| High jump | Olga Turchak; Ukraine Odesa | 1.92 m | Tatsiana Sheuchyk; Belarus Minsk | 1.90 m | Olga Bolșova; Moldova Kishinev | 1.90 m |
| Long jump | Inessa Kravets; Ukraine Kyiv | 7.04 m (+1.7 m/s) | Larysa Berezhna; Ukraine Kyiv | 7.01 m (+1.5 m/s) | Irina Mushailova; Russia Krasnodar | 6.86 m (+1.7 m/s) |
| Triple jump | Galina Chistyakova; Russia Moscow | 14.39 m (+1.2 m/s) | Natalya Kayukova; Russia Khabarovsk | 14.20 m (−0.3 m/s) | Inna Lasovskaya; Russia Moscow | 13.93 m (+1.0 m/s) |
| Shot put | Natalya Lisovskaya; Russia Moscow | 20.39 m | Svetlana Krivelyova; Russia Moscow Oblast | 20.20 m | Vita Pavlysh; Ukraine Kharkiv | 19.66 m |
| Discus throw | Ellina Zvereva; Belarus Minsk | 68.82 m | Larisa Korotkevich; Russia Krasnodar | 67.72 m | Olga Burova; Russia Volgograd | 65.16 m |
| Hammer throw | Olga Kuzenkova; Russia Smolensk | 63.86 m | Lyubov Karpova; Russia Moscow | 58.04 m | Natalya Vasilenko; Ukraine Mariupol | 51.48 m |
| Javelin throw | Natalya Shikolenko; Belarus Minsk | 70.36 m NR | Irina Kostyuchenkova; Ukraine Kharkiv | 63.16 m | Yelena Svezhentseva; Uzbekistan Tashkent | 61.76 m |
| Heptathlon | Irina Belova; Russia Irkutsk | 6523 pts | Anzhela Atroshchenko; Belarus Gomel | 6207 pts | Taisiya Dobrovitskaya; Belarus Minsk | 6122 pts |

== CIS Cross Country Championships ==
The CIS Cross Country Championships were held on 1 February in Kislovodsk, Stavropol Territory, Russia.

=== Men ===
| Event | Gold | | Silver | | Bronze | |
|---|---|---|---|---|---|---|
| 12 km | Farid Khayrullin; Russia Moscow | 37:57 | Andrey Usachev; Russia Ivanovo | 37:59 | Aleksandr Burtsev; Belarus Brest | 38:01 |

=== Women ===
| Event | Gold | | Silver | | Bronze | |
|---|---|---|---|---|---|---|
| 5 km | Nadezhda Ilina; Russia Cheboksary | 17:42 | Nadezhda Tatarenkova; Russia Abakan | 17:43 | Olga Churbanova; Russia Ekaterinburg | 17:46 |

== CIS Winter Throwing Championships ==
The CIS Winter Throwing Championships were held 21-23 February in Adler at the Labor Reserves stadium.

=== Men ===
| Event | Gold | | Silver | | Bronze | |
|---|---|---|---|---|---|---|
| Discus throw | Andrey Kuzyanin; Russia Moscow | 60.94 m | Yuriy Dumchev; Russia Moscow | 60.44 m | Dmitry Kovtsun; Ukraine Kyiv | 60.08 m |
| Hammer throw | Igor Nikulin; Russia Saint Petersburg | 80.04 m | Vitaliy Alisevich; Belarus Minsk | 78.66 m | Andriy Skvaruk; Ukraine Rivne | 77.80 m |
| Javelin throw | Andrey Novikov; Ukraine Kharkiv | 78.28 m | Sergey Gavras; Ukraine Romny | 74.70 m | Lev Shatilo; Russia Moscow Oblast | 74.62 m |

=== Women ===
| Event | Gold | | Silver | | Bronze | |
|---|---|---|---|---|---|---|
| Discus throw | Ellina Zvereva; Belarus Minsk | 65.24 m | Larisa Korotkevich; Belarus Minsk | 64.24 m | Antonina Patoka; Russia Saint Petersburg | 63.58 m |
| Hammer throw | Lyubov Karpova; Russia Moscow | 60.76 m | Only one participant | | | |
| Javelin throw | Natalya Shikolenko; Belarus Minsk | 65.42 m | Yekaterina Ivakina; Russia Saint Petersburg | 59.08 m | Irina Kostyuchenkova; Ukraine Kharkiv | 58.96 m |

- Note: Only one athlete competed in the senior women's hammer throw. The remaining participants competed in the under-23 and under-20 age groups.

== CIS Winter Race Walking Championships ==
The CIS Winter Race Walking Championships were held on February 22 in Sochi.

=== Men ===
| Event | Gold | | Silver | | Bronze | |
|---|---|---|---|---|---|---|
| 20 km walk | Yevgeniy Misyulya; Belarus Minsk | 1:19:03 | Vladimir Andreyev; Russia Cheboksary | 1:19:53 | Valeriy Borisov; Kazakhstan Temirtau | 1:21:42 |
| 30 km walk | Valeriy Spitsyn; Russia Chelyabinsk | 2:04:24 | Sergey Katurayev; Russia Cherepovets | 2:05:01 | Viktor Ginko; Belarus Minsk | 2:08:17 |

=== Women ===
| Event | Gold | | Silver | | Bronze | |
|---|---|---|---|---|---|---|
| 10 km walk | Alina Ivanova; Russia Cheboksary | 42:48 | Yelena Sayko; Russia Chelyabinsk | 43:15 | Lyudmila Mayorova; Russia Saint Petersburg | 44:22 |

== CIS 50 Kilometres Race Walking Championships ==
The CIS 50 Kilometres Race Walking Championships was held on 25 April in Moscow. The top three athletes appeared to all surpass the existing world record – the winner Valeriy Spitsyn by more than four minutes. However, the times were discounted as further investigation revealed the route was short of the required 50 kilometres. Only men competed at this distance

| Event | Gold | | Silver | | Bronze | |
|---|---|---|---|---|---|---|
| 50 km walk | Valeriy Spitsyn; Russia Chelyabinsk | 3:33:22* | Vitaliy Popovich; Ukraine Brovary | 3:36:12* | Andrey Plotnikov; Russia Vladimir | 3:37:05* |

== CIS Race Walking Championships ==
The CIS Race Walking Championships was held on 30 May in Moscow.

=== Men ===
| Event | Gold | | Silver | | Bronze | |
|---|---|---|---|---|---|---|
| 20 km walk | Vladimir Andreyev; Russia Cheboksary | 1:21:08 | Oleg Troshin; Russia Moscow Oblast | 1:21:12 | Vladimir Druchik; Ukraine Lutsk | 1:21:17 |

=== Women ===
| Event | Gold | | Silver | | Bronze |
|---|---|---|---|---|---|
| 10 km walk | Yelena Nikolayeva; Russia Cheboksary | 43:03 | Yelena Sayko; Russia Chelyabinsk | 43:13 | |

== Unified team selection ==
As a result of the performance at the CIS Championships, the following athletes were selected for the Olympic Unified Team.

=== Men ===
- 100 m: Vitaly Savin, Pavel Galkin.
- 200 m: Edwin Ivanov.
- 400 m: Dmitry Kosov.
- 800 m: Anatoly Makarevich.
- 1500 m: Azat Rakipov.
- 5000 m: Andrey Tikhonov.
- 10,000 m: Oleg Strizhakov.
- Marathon: Jacob Tolstikov.
- 3000 m steeplechase: Ivan Konovalov, Vladimir Golyas.
- 110 m hurdles: Sergey Usov, Vladimir Shishkin, Vadim Kurach.
- 400 m hurdles: Vadim Zadoynov, Oleg Tverdokhleb.
- High jump: Igor Paklin, Yuri Sergienko.
- Pole Vault: Maxim Tarasov, Igor Trandenkov, Sergey Bubka.
- Long jump: Dmitry Bagryanov, Vadim Ivanov.
- Triple jump: Alexander Kovalenko, Leonid Voloshin, Vasily Sokov.
- Shot put: Andrei Nemchaninov, Vyacheslav Lyho, Alexander Klimenko.
- Discus throw: Vladimir Zinchenko, Dmitry Shevchenko, Dmitry Kovtsun.
- Hammer throw: Igor Astapkovich, Andrei Abduvaliev, Igor Nikulin.
- Javelin throw: Viktor Zaitsev, Dmitry Polyunin, Andrey Shevchuk.
- Decathlon: Edward Hämäläinen, Ramil Ganiev, Victor Radchenko.
- 20 km walk: Mikhail Schennikov, Vladimir Andreev, Oleg Troshin.
- 50 km walk: Alexander Potashev, Andrey Perlov, Valery Spitsyn.
- 4 × 100 m relay: Vitaly Savin, Pavel Galkin, Edwin Ivanov, Andrey Fedoriv.
- 4 × 400 m relay: Dmitry Kosov, Dmitry Kliger, Dmitry Golovastov, Oleg Tverdokhleb.

=== Women ===
- 100 m: Irina Privalova, Olga Bogoslovskaya.
- 200 m: Galina Malchugina, Irina Privalova, Marina Trandenkova.
- 400 m: Olga Nazarova, Olga Bryzgina, Elena Ruzina.
- 800 m: Lilia Nurutdinova, Lyubov Gurina, Inna Evseeva.
- 1500 m: Lyudmila Rogacheva, Tatyana Samolenko, Ekaterina Podkopaeva.
- 3000 m: Elena Romanova, Tatiana Samolenko, Elena Kopytova.
- 10,000 m: Elena Vyazova, Olga Bondarenko, Lyudmila Matveyeva.
- Marathon: Valentina Egorova, Ramilya Burangulova, Madina Biktagirova.
- 100 m hurdles: Lyudmila Narozhilenko, Marina Azyabina, Natalya Kolovanova.
- 400 m hurdles: Tatiana Ledovskaya, Margarita Ponomareva, Vera Ordina.
- High jump: Olga Turchak, Tatyana Shevchik, Olga Bolshova.
- Long jump: Inessa Kravets, Larisa Berezhnaya, Irina Mushailova.
- Shot put: Natalya Lisovskaya, Svetlana Kriveleva, Vita Pavlysh.
- Discus throw: Larisa Korotkevich, Olga Burova, Irina Yatchenko.
- Javelin throw: Natalia Shikolenko, Irina Kostyuchenkova, Elena Svezhentseva.
- Heptathlon: Irina Belova, Angela Atroshchenko.
- 10 km walk: Alina Ivanova, Elena Nikolaeva, Elena Saiko.
- 4 × 100 m relay: Galina Malchugina, Irina Privalova, Olga Bogoslovskaya, Marina Trandenkova.
- 4 × 400 m relay: Olga Nazarova, Olga Bryzgina, Elena Ruzina, Marina Shmonina, Lyudmila Dzhigalova, Lilia Nurutdinova.
