= Athletics at the 1995 Pan American Games – Men's triple jump =

Men's triple jump at the Pan American Games

The men's triple jump event at the 1995 Pan American Games was held at the Estadio Atletico "Justo Roman" on 24 March.

== Results ==
Rank	Name	Nationality	#1	#2	#3	#4	#5	#6	Result	Notes
1st place, gold medalist(s)	Yoelvis Quesada	Cuba	17.13	17.67	17.28	x	17.57	17.43	17.67	
2nd place, silver medalist(s)	Jérôme Romain	Dominica	16.73	16.83	17.24	17.20	16.99	17.24	17.24	
3rd place, bronze medalist(s)	Yoel García	Cuba	x	17.21w	x	16.46	x	x	17.21w	
4	LaMark Carter	United States	16.52	16.49	16.77w	16.37	x	16.30	16.77w	
5	Anísio Silva	Brazil	13.36	16.61w	16.16	x	–	–	16.61w	
6	Richard Thompson	United States	16.16w	x	x	x	15.86	x	16.16w	
7	Freddy Nieves	Ecuador	x	15.15	15.34	15.46	15.00	15.20	15.46	
8	Wayne McSween	Grenada	14.72	15.35	15.05	14.92	15.10	15.30	15.35	
9	Vance Clarke	Saint Kitts and Nevis	14.64	14.81	14.67				14.81	
10	Mariano Sala	Argentina	14.36	x	14.47				14.47	
11	Pedro Arturo Piccardo	Paraguay	14.08	x	14.08				14.08	
12	Lloyd Phipps-Browne	Saint Kitts and Nevis	x	13.33w	x				13.33w	
	Brian Wellman	Bermuda							DNS	
	Juan Chávez	Argentina							DNS	
	Frank Rutherford	Bahamas							DNS	
