= 1994 European Athletics Indoor Championships – Men's triple jump =

Men's triple jump event at the European athletic indoor championships

The men's triple jump event at the 1994 European Athletics Indoor Championships was held in Palais Omnisports de Paris-Bercy on 12 March.

== Results ==
Rank	Name	Nationality	#1	#2	#3	#4	#5	#6	Result	Notes
1st place, gold medalist(s)	Leonid Voloshin	Russia	17.36	16.87	x	17.44	x	x	17.44	
2nd place, silver medalist(s)	Denis Kapustin	Russia	17.20	16.99	17.35	17.22	17.30	16.81	17.35	
3rd place, bronze medalist(s)	Vasiliy Sokov	Russia	16.43	x	17.31	17.24	x	x	17.31	
4	Serge Hélan	France	16.54	16.62	16.93	17.23	x	16.86	17.23	
5	Georges Sainte-Rose	France	16.70	16.96	16.92	x	x	x	16.96	
6	Māris Bružiks	Latvia	x	16.36	16.54	x	16.83	16.61	16.83	
7	Ralf Jaros	Germany	16.78	x	16.78	x	16.49	x	16.78	
8	Lars Hedman	Sweden	16.53	x	16.66	16.42	x	x	16.66	
9	Pierre Andersson	Sweden	16.32	16.47	16.29				16.47	
10	Aleksandr Glavatskiy	Belarus	14.41	15.40	16.43				16.43	
11	Karsten Richter	Germany	13.47	x	16.29				16.29	
12	Audrius Raizgys	Lithuania	15.81	16.25	16.28				16.28	
13	Francis Agyepong	Great Britain	x	16.27	x				16.27	
14	Julian Golley	Great Britain	16.17	16.10	x				16.17	
	Pierre Camara	France							DNS	
