= 1993 World Championships in Athletics – Men's long jump =

These are the official results of the Men's Long Jump event at the 1993 IAAF World Championships in Stuttgart, Germany. There were a total of 45 participating athletes, with two qualifying groups and the final held on Friday August 20, 1993.

== Medalists ==
Gold	Mike Powell; United States (USA)
Silver	Stanislav Tarasenko; Russia (RUS)
Bronze	Vitaliy Kyrylenko; Ukraine (UKR)

== Records ==
World record	Mike Powell (USA)	8.95	Tokyo, Japan	30 August 1991
Championship Record	Mike Powell (USA)	8.95	Tokyo, Japan	30 August 1991

== Final ==
Rank	Athlete	Attempts						Distance	Note
Rank	Athlete	1	2	3	4	5	6	Distance	Note
1st place, gold medalist(s)	Mike Powell (USA)	x	8.16	8.28	8.22	8.43	8.59	8.59 m	
2nd place, silver medalist(s)	Stanislav Tarasenko (RUS)	7.85	7.84	8.01	8.16	8.02	x	8.16 m	
3rd place, bronze medalist(s)	Vitaliy Kyrylenko (UKR)	7.95	7.87	7.90	7.81	8.15	x	8.15 m	
4	Erick Walder (USA)	7.74	7.94	7.72	7.71	8.05	8.02	8.05 m	
5	Ivaylo Mladenov (BUL)	7.93	x	8.00	7.85	7.75	x	8.00 m	
6	Nikolay Antonov (BUL)	7.97	7.89	7.95	x	7.81	7.84	7.97 m	
7	Aliaksandar Hlavatski (BLR)	7.70	x	7.90	7.94	7.95	x	7.95 m	
8	Francois Fouche (RSA)	7.93	7.84	7.82	x	7.88	x	7.93 m	
9	André Müller (GER)							7.83 m	
10	Spyridon Vasdekis (GRE)							7.80 m	
11	Milan Gombala (CZE)							7.69 m	
—	Iván Pedroso (CUB)							NM	

== Qualifying round ==
- Held on Saturday 1993-08-14

RANK	GROUP A	DISTANCE
1.	Erick Walder (USA)	8.30 m
2.	Iván Pedroso (CUB)	8.23 m
3.	Ivaylo Mladenov (BUL)	8.10 m
4.	Francois Fouche (RSA)	7.95 m
5.	Nikolay Antonov (BUL)	7.91 m
6.	Konstantinos Koukodimos (GRE)	7.90 m
7.	Ángel Hernández (ESP)	7.86 m
8.	Joe Greene (USA)	7.86 m
9.	Obinna Eregbu (NGR)	7.85 m
10.	Vasiliy Sokov (RUS)	7.75 m
11.	Vladimir Malyavin (TKM)	7.66 m
12.	Lotfi Khaida (ALG)	7.65 m
13.	Wendell Williams (TRI)	7.63 m
14.	Jérôme Romain (DMA)	7.62 m
15.	Viktor Rudenik (BLR)	7.60 m
16.	Konstantin Krause (GER)	7.53 m
17.	Eugene Licorish (GRN)	7.48 m
18.	Banaras Khan (PAK)	7.43 m
19.	Edrick Floreal (CAN)	7.39 m
20.	Nelson Ferreira (BRA)	7.31 m
—	Tibor Ordina (HUN)	NM
—	Rogelio Sainz (MEX)	NM

RANK	GROUP B	DISTANCE
1.	Mike Powell (USA)	8.15 m
2.	Stanislav Tarasenko (RUS)	8.05 m
3.	Aleksandr Glavatskiy (BLR)	8.03 m
4.	Vitaliy Kyrylenko (UKR)	8.01 m
5.	Milan Gombala (CZE)	7.99 m
6.	Spyridon Vasdekis (GRE)	7.99 m
7.	André Müller (GER)	7.95 m
8.	Elmer Williams (PUR)	7.86 m
9.	Jaime Jefferson (CUB)	7.86 m
10.	Craig Hepburn (BAH)	7.83 m
11.	Bernhard Kelm (GER)	7.78 m
12.	Mattias Sunneborn (SWE)	7.78 m
13.	Juha Kivi (FIN)	7.69 m
14.	Robert Emmiyan (ARM)	7.66 m
15.	Fred Salle (GBR)	7.60 m
16.	Masaki Morinaga (JPN)	7.58 m
17.	Franck Zio (BUR)	7.42 m
18.	Musabbah Ali Saeed (UAE)	7.41 m
19.	Hui-Fang Nai (TPE)	7.31 m
20.	Galin Georgiev (BUL)	7.27 m
21.	Frans Maas (NED)	7.26 m
22.	Ahmed Al-Moamari (OMA)	7.23 m
23.	Olive Fifita (TGA)	6.86 m

== See also ==
- 1990 Men's European Championships Long Jump (Split)
- 1991 Men's World Championships Long Jump (Tokyo)
- 1992 Men's Olympic Long Jump (Barcelona)
- 1994 Men's European Championships Long Jump (Helsinki)
- 1995 Men's World Championships Long Jump (Gothenburg)
