= Athletics at the 1992 Summer Olympics – Men's triple jump =

Men's triple jump at the Games of the XXV Olympiad
- Venues: Estadi Olímpic Lluís Companys
- Dates: August 1, 1992 (qualifying); August 3, 1992 (final)
- Competitors: 47 from 32 nations
- Winning distance: 18.17

Medalists
1st place, gold medalist(s)		Mike Conley Sr. United States
2nd place, silver medalist(s)		Charles Simpkins; United States
3rd place, bronze medalist(s)		Frank Rutherford; Bahamas

Official Video Highlights @ 12:30

The final of the men's triple jump event at the 1992 Summer Olympics in Barcelona, Spain was held on August 3, 1992. There were 47 participating athletes from 32 nations, with two qualifying groups. The maximum number of athletes per nation had been set at 3 since the 1930 Olympic Congress. Mike Conley Sr. set a new Olympic record with 17.63 m. He also jumped 18.17 m which would also improve the standing world record, but this jump had wind assistance 2.1 m/s. The top twelve and ties, and all those reaching 17.00 metres advanced to the final. The qualification round was held on August 1, 1992. Conley's gold was the United States's fifth victory in the men's triple jump, surpassing the Soviet Union's four. Conley was the 11th man to win two medals in the event, and the first to do so in non-consecutive Games. Frank Rutherford's bronze was the first medal for the Bahamas in the event.

== Background ==
This was the 22nd appearance of the event, which is one of 12 athletics events to have been held at every Summer Olympics. The returning finalists from the 1988 Games were gold medalist Khristo Markov of Bulgaria, bronze medalist Aleksandr Kovalenko of the Soviet Union/Unified Team, fifth-place finisher Charles Simpkins of the United States, tenth-place finisher Norbert Elliott of the Bahamas, and twelfth-place finisher Norifumi Yamashita of Japan. American Mike Conley Sr., silver medalist in 1984 but who had not made the team in 1988, returned and was favored. Leonid Voloshin, on the Unified Team, was the biggest challenger.

Barbados, Honduras, Israel, Latvia, Swaziland, and Zimbabwe each made their first appearance in the event; some former Soviet republics appeared as the Unified Team. The United States competed for the 21st time, having missed only the boycotted 1980 Games.

== Competition format ==
The competition used the two-round format introduced in 1936. In the qualifying round, each jumper received three attempts to reach the qualifying distance of 17.00 metres; if fewer than 12 men did so, the top 12 (including all those tied) would advance. In the final round, each athlete had three jumps; the top eight received an additional three jumps, with the best of the six to count.

== Records ==
Prior to the competition, the existing world and Olympic records were as follows.

World record	Willie Banks (USA)	17.97	Indianapolis, United States	16 June 1985
Olympic record	Khristo Markov (BUL)	17.61	Seoul, South Korea	24 September 1988

Mike Conley Sr. broke the Olympic record with a jump of 17.63 metres in the second round of the final. In the sixth round, he jumped 18.17 metres, which would have been a new world record, but the 2.1 metres per second wind assistance was just slightly over the limit of 2.0 metres per second required for record consideration.

The following national records were set during the competition:

Nation	Athlete	Round	Distance
Kuwait	Marsoq Al-Yoha	Qualifying	16.75
Swaziland	Sydney Mdluli	Qualifying	16.18

== Schedule ==
All times are Central European Summer Time (UTC+2)

Date	Time	Round
Saturday, 1 August 1992	18:00	Qualifying
Monday, 3 August 1992	19:30	Final

== Results ==
=== Qualifying ===
Rank	Athlete	Nation	1	2	3	Distance	Notes
1	Pierre Camara	France	X	16.58	17.34	17.34	Q
2	Frank Rutherford	Bahamas	X	16.96	17.28	17.28	Q
3	Mike Conley Sr.	United States	17.23	—	—	17.23	Q
4	Yoelvis Quesada	Cuba	16.93	16.90	17.21	17.21	Q
5	Leonid Voloshin	Unified Team	17.21	—	—	17.21	Q
6	Brian Wellman	Bermuda	16.26	16.69	17.16	17.16	Q
7	Charles Simpkins	United States	16.41	16.59	17.05	17.05	Q
8	Zou Sixin	China	17.07	—	—	17.07	Q
9	Māris Bružiks	Latvia	16.94	X	X	16.94	q
10	Aleksandr Kovalenko	Unified Team	X	16.93	X	16.93	q
11	Eugeniusz Bedeniczuk	Poland	X	16.92	X	16.92	q
12	Vasiliy Sokov	Unified Team	16.91	13.52	X	16.91	q
13	Ralf Jaros	Germany	16.89	X	X	16.89	
14	Toussaint Rabenala	Madagascar	16.45	16.58	16.84	16.84	
15	Milan Mikuláš	Czechoslovakia	X	X	16.82	16.82	
16	Marsoq Al-Yoha	Kuwait	16.44	16.75	X	16.75	NR
17	Wendell Lawrence	Bahamas	14.57	16.53	16.70	16.70	
18	Francis Agyepong	Great Britain	X	16.55	X	16.55	
19	Georges Sainte-Rose	France	16.25	16.50	16.17	16.50	
20	Serge Hélan	France	16.27	16.23	16.47	16.47	
21	Khristo Markov	Bulgaria	X	X	16.46	16.46	
22	Paul Nioze	Seychelles	16.32	15.86	15.66	16.32	
23	Lotfi Khaïda	Algeria	16.31	16.30	X	16.31	
24	Rogel Nachum	Israel	16.13	16.23	—	16.23	
25	John Tillman	United States	16.22	X	X	16.22	
26	Julian Golley	Great Britain	16.16	16.18	X	16.18	
27	Sydney Mdluli	Swaziland	15.78	16.07	16.18	16.18	NR
28	Santiago Moreno	Spain	15.71	16.04	16.04	16.04	
29	Anísio Silva	Brazil	16.03	X	X	16.03	
30	Norifumi Yamashita	Japan	X	15.51	15.97	15.97	
31	Ndabazinhle Mdhlongwa	Zimbabwe	X	X	15.96	15.96	
32	Alvin Haynes	Barbados	X	15.93	15.64	15.93	
33	Norbert Elliot	Bahamas	X	X	15.85	15.85	
34	Andrzej Grabarczyk	Poland	X	15.79	15.52	15.79	
35	Jonathan Edwards	Great Britain	X	15.76	15.06	15.76	
36	Chen Yanping	China	15.66	15.48	X	15.66	
37	Tord Henriksson	Sweden	14.48	15.30	15.66	15.66	
38	Jorge Luis Teixeira	Brazil	15.64	15.50	X	15.64	
39	Marios Hadjiandreou	Cyprus	15.64	15.32	—	15.64	
40	António Dias dos Santos	Angola	15.48	15.41	15.38	15.48	
41	Banarus Muhammad Khan	Pakistan	X	X	15.37	15.37	
42	Luis Flores	Honduras	15.08	13.88	14.52	15.08	
43	Nikolay Raev	Bulgaria	X	14.67	—	14.67	
44	Elston Shaw	Belize	X	13.13	13.56	13.56	
—	Oral Ogilvie	Canada	X	X	X	No mark	
—	Galin Georgiev	Bulgaria	X	X	—	No mark	
—	Francis Dodoo	Ghana	X	—	—	No mark	

=== Final ===
Rank	Athlete	Nation	1	2	3	4	5	6	Distance	Notes
1st place, gold medalist(s)	Mike Conley Sr.	United States	16.82	17.63 OR	17.19	17.54	X	18.17(w)	18.17	OR
2nd place, silver medalist(s)	Charles Simpkins	United States	16.87	16.66	X	16.74	17.29	17.60	17.60	
3rd place, bronze medalist(s)	Frank Rutherford	Bahamas	16.75	17.36	17.36	17.16	16.33	X	17.36	
4	Leonid Voloshin	Unified Team	17.32	17.24	X	X	17.32	16.82	17.32	
5	Brian Wellman	Bermuda	16.98	17.24	16.99	X	X	X	17.24	
6	Yoelbi Quesada	Cuba	17.15	16.75	17.05	X	17.04	17.18	17.18	
7	Aleksandr Kovalenko	Unified Team	16.84	16.92	X	16.78	17.06	X	17.06	
8	Zou Sixin	China	X	17.00	X	X	—	—	17.00	
9	Vasiliy Sokov	Unified Team	16.86	15.84	X	Did not advance			16.86	
10	Māris Bružiks	Latvia	16.56	X	16.80	Did not advance			16.80	
11	Pierre Camara	France	16.52	X	14.48	Did not advance			16.52	
12	Eugeniusz Bedeniczuk	Poland	16.23	X	16.15	Did not advance			16.23	

== See also ==
- 1990 Men's European Championships Triple Jump
- 1991 Men's World Championships Triple Jump
- 1993 Men's World Championships Triple Jump
