= Luther High School South =

Luther South Math, Science & Performing Arts High School

Location
- Chicago, Illinois; United States; 41°44′9.3″N 87°42′2.2″W

Information
- Former name: Luther South Math, Science, and Performing Arts High School
- Type: Private secondary
- Motto: Education for the mind and spirit
- Established: 1951
- Status: Closed
- Closed: June 2014
- Grades: 6–12
- Gender: Co-educational
- Colors: Red and white
- Mascot: Braves
- Yearbook: SHIELD
- Website: the-new-luther-highschool.weebly.com

Luther High School South was a private Lutheran high school on the northeast corner of 87th Street and Kedzie Avenue in the Ashburn neighborhood on the southwest side of Chicago, Illinois, near the village of Evergreen Park. From 2009 to 2010, the school was named Luther South Math, Science, and Performing Arts High School, with the name, the focus, and the primary source of funding for the school changed after several years of difficult financial situations. The name was changed again following that school year. As a result of a significant drop in student enrollment, the school closed in June 2014. The school building was demolished in 2021-2022, with plans to build a Pete's Fresh Market. As of 2024, Pete’s is planning to use an empty store front and leave the lot vacant.

== Notable alumni ==
- Common, rapper and actor
- Mike Conley, Sr., Olympic triple jump gold medalist
- Steve Conley, former NFL linebacker
- Jabari "Naladge" Evans, rapper
- Arny Freytag, photographer
- Kyle T. Heffner, actor
- Kel Mitchell, actor
- Captain Sky, musician
