= Eugeniusz Bedeniczuk =

Polish triple jumper (1961–2023)

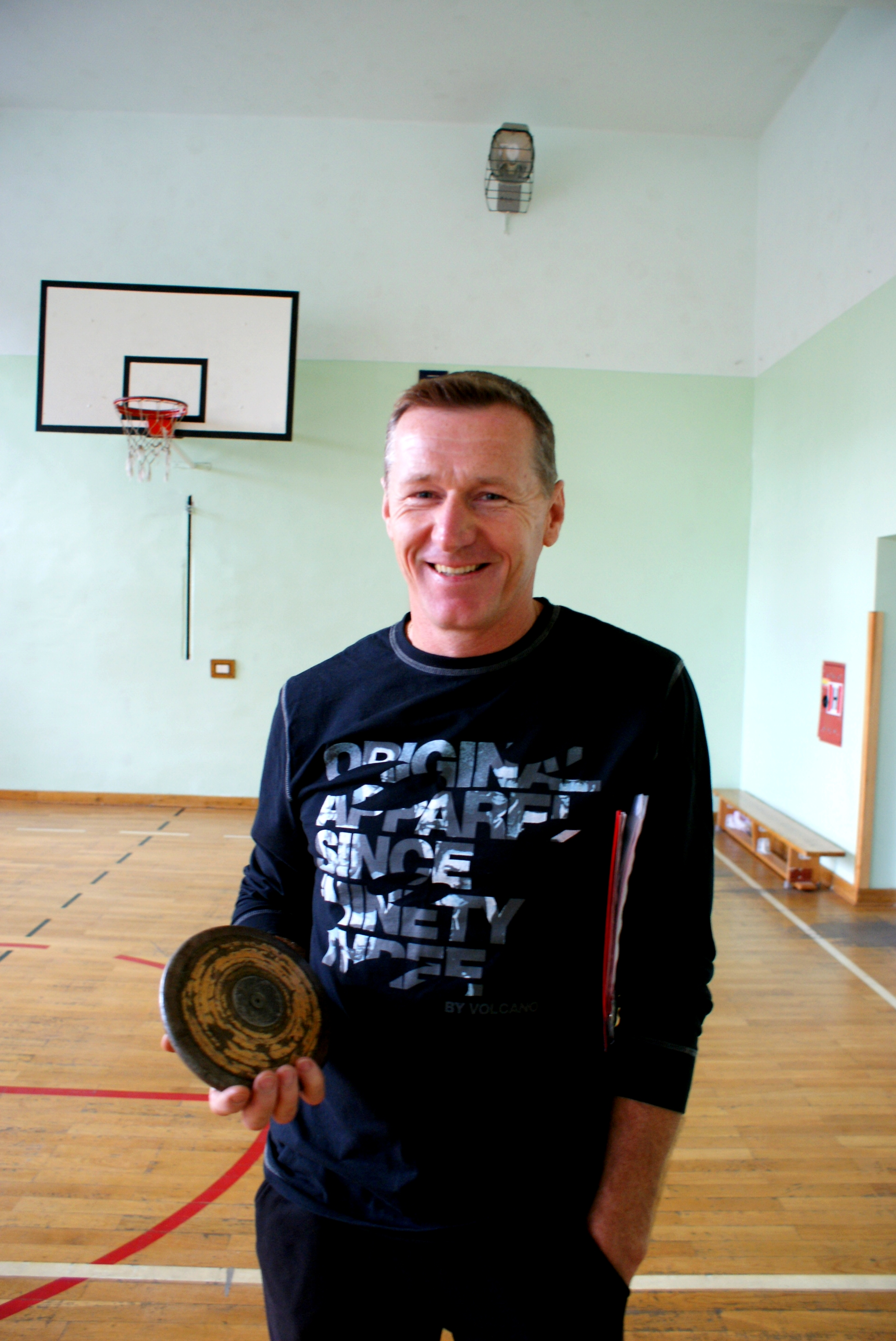
Bedeniczuk in 2011

Eugeniusz Bedeniczuk (6 January 1961 — 2 May 2023) was a Polish male triple jumper, who represented his native country at the 1992 Summer Olympics in Barcelona, Spain. He set his personal best (17.08 m) in the men's triple jump event in 1992.

Bedeniczuk was born in Lachy, Podlaskie on 6 January 1961, and died in Bielsk Podlaski on 2 May 2023, at the age of 62.

== Competition record ==
Year	Competition	Venue	Position	Event	Notes
Representing Poland
1990	European Championships	Split, Yugoslavia	11th	Triple jump	16.60 m
1991	World Championships	Tokyo, Japan	14th (q)	Triple jump	16.76 m
1992	Olympic Games	Barcelona, Spain	12th	Triple jump	16.23 m

== Sources ==
- sports-reference
