= Golden West Invitational =

The Golden West Invitational (GWI) is an annual post-season track and field meet for high school athletes in the Sacramento area of California. It began in Los Angeles in 1960 and moved to the Sacramento area in 1965. Its organizers describe it as the longest-running post-season high school meet in the United States.

Participants have included Olympians Allyson Felix, Jim Ryun, Tommie Smith, Evelyn Ashford and Steve Prefontaine.

== History ==
The first five meets were held in Los Angeles. Sacramento-area venues have included Hughes Stadium, Sacramento State, American River College and Folsom High School.

Athletes set three national high school records at the 1967 meet at Hughes Stadium. One was Karl Salb's shot put of 69 feet 6 inches (21.18 m).

Meet director Maree Rodebaugh died in a shot put officiating accident about two weeks before the 1977 meet.

At the 1979 meet, Michael Carter threw the shot put 81 feet 3.5 inches (24.778 m). The mark remained the national high school record as of 2023. At that time, no other high school athlete had thrown 80 feet with the 12-pound (5.4 kg) shot.

The meet moved to Berkeley in 2013, with Edwards Stadium at the University of California, Berkeley announced as the venue. It returned to Hornet Stadium at Sacramento State in 2014 and was held alongside the 2014 USA Outdoor Track and Field Championships.

The 2026 meet took place June 5–7 at Cordova High School in Rancho Cordova. The meet is presented by the Golden West Association, LLC.

== Format ==
The meet has no heats or trials and no team scoring. Boys' records date to 1960. Girls' events were added in 1988. Youth, open and masters athletes have competed since 2015, but meet records are kept only for high school athletes.

== Notable participants ==
According to the organizers, former participants have earned more than 200 selections to United States Olympic teams and won more than 90 Olympic medals, including 48 golds. Nine others represented France, Ireland, Trinidad and Tobago, Fiji, Jamaica and Cape Verde.

Olympians who competed at the meet include Evelyn Ashford, Bob Beamon, Stacy Dragila, Allyson Felix, Kenny Harrison, Joanna Hayes, Monique Henderson, Marion Jones, Meb Keflezighi, Marty Liquori, Steve Prefontaine, Jim Ryun, Tommie Smith, Dwight Stones and Jeremy Wariner.

Participants who later played professional American football include:

- Mel Renfro, hurdles, 1960
- Terry Bradshaw, javelin, 1966
- Russ Francis, javelin, 1971
- James Lofton, long jump, 1974
- Art Monk, hurdles, 1976
- Michael Carter, discus, 1979
