= Aleksandr Goremykin =

Soviet-Russian sprinter

Personal information
- Born: Aleksandr Borisovich Goremykin; Алекса́ндр Бори́сович Горемы́кин; 3 March 1971 (age 55)

Sport
- Country: Soviet Union; Russia
- Sport: Athletics
- Event: 200 metres
- Retired: 2000

Achievements and titles
- World finals: 8th (1991)
- National finals: 1 Soviet title 1 CIS title 2 Russian titles
- Personal bests: 100 metres: 10.30 (1990); 200 metres: 20.36 (1991)
Medal record
European Indoor Championships
| Bronze medal – third place | 1992 Genoa | 200 m |

Aleksandr Borisovich Goremykin (Russian: Алекса́ндр Бори́сович Горемы́кин; born 3 March 1971), also known as Aleksandr Sokolov (Russian: Алекса́ндр Соколо́в), is a Soviet-Russian former track and field sprinter who specialized in the 200 metres. He competed at two editions of the World Championships in Athletics: first for the Soviet Union in 1991, where he placed eighth in the 200 m final and seventh in the 4 × 100 metres relay with the Soviet team, then at the 1995 World Championships in Athletics for Russia, where he ran in qualifying only individually and in the relay. He set his 200 m personal best at the 1991 championships, running 20.36 seconds in the quarter-finals.

Goremykin won three senior international medals. He was a silver medallist in the 4 × 100 metres relay at the 1991 European Cup for the Soviet Union, the bronze medallist in the 200 m for the Commonwealth of Independent States team at the 1992 European Athletics Indoor Championships, and the 200 m bronze medallist for Russia at the 1995 European Cup. He was a three-time national champion in the 200 m, winning at the 1991 Soviet Athletics Championships and in 1992 and 1995 at the Russian Athletics Championships.

As a junior athlete he set a championship record time of 20.47 seconds to win the 200 m at the 1990 World Junior Championships in Athletics and also anchored a team including Sergejs Inšakovs, Konstantin Gromadskiy and Vitaliy Semyonov to the 4 × 100 metres relay silver medal behind the United States.

He is one of the current national record holders in 4 × 100 metres relay with 38.46 seconds, achieved at the 1990 European Athletics Championships in Split, Croatia.

He mostly competed under the name Goremykin prior to 1992 and as Sokolov thereafter.

== Personal bests ==
- 100 metres – 10.30 seconds (1990)
- 200 metres – 20.36 seconds (1991)

== International competitions ==
| Year | Competition | Venue | Position | Event | Time | Notes |
Representing the Soviet Union
| 1988 | World Junior Championships | Sudbury, Canada | 6th | 200 m | 21.12 | w (wind: +4.2 m/s) |
| 1990 | European Championships | Split, Yugoslavia | 4th | 4 × 100 m relay | 38.46 | NR |
| 1990 | World Junior Championships | Plovdiv, Bulgaria | 1st | 200 m | 20.47 | (wind: -0.5 m/s) CR |
| 1990 | World Junior Championships | Plovdiv, Bulgaria | 2nd | 4 × 100m relay | 39.58 | |
| 1991 | European Cup | Frankfurt, Germany | 2nd | 4 × 100 m relay | 38.87 | |
| 1991 | World Championships | Tokyo, Japan | 8th | 200 m | 20.78 | |
| 1991 | World Championships | Tokyo, Japan | 7th | 4 × 100 m relay | 38.68 | |
Representing the Commonwealth of Independent States
| 1992 | European Indoor Championships | Genoa, Italy | 3rd | 200 m | 21.09 | |
Representing Russia
| 1995 | European Cup | Villeneuve-d'Ascq, France | 3rd | 200 m | 20.64 | |
| 1995 | World Championships | Gothenburg, Sweden | qual. | 200 m | 21.17 | |
| 1995 | World Championships | Gothenburg, Sweden | 6th (semis) | 4 × 100 m relay | 38.78 | |

== National titles ==
- Soviet Athletics Championships
  - 200 m: 1991
- CIS Indoor Athletics Championships
  - 200 m: 1992
- Russian Athletics Championships
  - 200 m: 1992, 1995

== See also ==
- List of 200 metres national champions (men)
