= Timothy Eneas =

Bahamian swimmer (born 1972)

Personal information
- Born: 25 October 1972 (age 53)

Sport
- Sport: Swimming

Timothy Eneas (born 25 October 1972) is a Bahamian swimmer. He competed in two events at the 1992 Summer Olympics.
