= Kenny Harrison =

American triple jumper and long jumper

Personal information
- Nationality: American
- Born: February 13, 1965 (age 61) Milwaukee, Wisconsin, United States
- Height: 1.78 m (5 ft 10 in)
- Weight: 75 kg (165 lb)

Sport
- Sport: Track and field
- Events: Triple jump, Long jump
- College team: Kansas State Wildcats '88

Achievements and titles
- Personal bests: Triple Jump: 18.09 m (59 ft 4 in) (OR, Atlanta 1996) Long Jump: 8.23 m (27 ft 0 in) (Ames, IA 1988) High Jump: 2.01 m (6 ft 7 in) (1983)
Medal record
Men's athletics
Representing the United States
Olympic Games
Gold medal – first place	1996 Atlanta	Triple jump
World Championships
Gold medal – first place	1991 Tokyo	Triple jump
Goodwill Games
Gold medal – first place	1990 Seattle	Triple jump
Gold medal – first place	1994 St. Petersburg	Triple jump
Summer Universiade
Silver medal – second place	1987 Zagreb	Triple jump

Kenny Lorenzo Harrison (born Kerry Harrison, February 13, 1965) is a former track and field athlete competing in triple jump. He won the gold medal at the 1996 Olympic games in Atlanta.

== Athletic career ==
=== High school ===
Harrison went to Brookfield Central for high school, where he competed in football, basketball and track. He holds schools records in the long, high, and triple jump. His triple jump of 52 feet 4.5 inches at the 1983 Golden West Invitational ranked him #2 triple jump prep in the nation, and currently stands as the Wisconsin high school #1 all-time triple jump by over 2 feet. That mark also ranks on the top 10 list for the Golden West Invitational. He also had a personal best in the long jump of 23 feet 4 inches, which ranks among the top 35 in Wisconsin high school track & field history and a high jump of 6 feet 7 inches. He held the Wisconsin state meet triple jump record of 48' 6.25" for 22 years, from 1983 to 2005.

=== College ===
Harrison attended college at Kansas State University, where he captured three individual titles at the NCAA Championships, the most in school history. He was a 8-time Big 12 Conference individual champion in both indoor and outdoor long and triple jump. He holds school records in indoor long jump (26' 9.75") and outdoor long and triple jump (26' 11.5" and 56'0", respectively).

Harrison is the first K-State Track and Field athlete to be inducted into the Kansas State University Athletic Hall of Fame. The former Wildcat letterman was an 11-time NCAA All-American during his time at Kansas State University from 1984 to 1988. Competing primarily in jumps, Harrison won NCAA indoor titles in the long jump in 1986 and the triple jump in 1988. He also won the NCAA outdoor triple jump crown in 1986 as well as being a three-time runner up in the NCAA Championships. Along with numerous accolades on the national stage, Harrison was a 15-time Big 8 Champion and still holds as of 2015 the school records in the indoor and outdoor long jump and outdoor triple jump.

=== Olympics ===
The 1991 World triple jump Champion, his chances of competing in the 1992 Olympics were ruined when he tore the cartilage in his knee. After recovering from surgery, Harrison bounded back to win the gold medal at the 1996 Summer Olympics with a personal best, American and Olympic record of 18.09 m (59 ft 4 in). This jump is notable for the fact that it stood as the longest triple jump with a head wind until 2024, when the Spanish jumper Jordan Díaz jumped 18.18 into a -0.3 wind at the European championships. The jump ranks Harrison as the sixth best triple jumper in history, behind Jonathan Edwards (18.29WR), Christian Taylor (18.21), Jordan Díaz (18.18), Andy Díaz (18.15), and Will Claye (18.14)

=== USATF ===
Harrison was inducted in the USATF Hall of Fame in 2013.

1998: best of 55–11.25...8th at Goodwill Games (54–2.75)...ranked #4 U.S. in TJ by T&FN.

1997: best of 57–5.5...won USA Champs (55–8.25)...9th at World Champs (55–11.25)...ranked #4 in world (#1 U.S.) at TJ by T&FN.

1996: best of 59–4.25...won Olympic Trials (59–1.25w)...gold at Olympic Games (59–4.25 AR)...ranked #2 in world (#1 U.S.) at TJ by T&FN.

1995: best of 55–11.25...won USA Indoor (55–9)...ranked #2 U.S. at TJ by T&FN.

1994: best of 57–2.25...2nd in USA Champs...ranked #2 in world (#2 U.S.) at TJ by T&FN.

1993: best of 56–8...2nd in USA Champs (56–8)...10th at World Champs (55–11.75)...ranked #2 U.S. at TJ by T&FN.

1992: best of 55–11.75...6th in Olympic Trials...surgery for torn cartilage in knee...ranked #4 U.S. at TJ by T&FN.

1991: best of 58–4...won USA Champs (56–10)...won gold at World Champs (58–4)...ranked #1 in world at TJ by T&FN.

1990: best of 58–10...won USA Indoor (55–0)...won USA Champs (56–3.25)...won Goodwill Games (58–1.25)...lost only once, in Zurich to Mike Conley...ranked #1 in world at TJ by T&FN.

1989: best of 57–3.75...6th in USA Indoor...ranked #4 in world (#2 U.S.) at TJ by T&FN.

1988: best of 56–3.25...won NCAA Indoor; 8th in LJ...2nd in NCAA LJ...6th in Olympic Trials...ranked #4 U.S. at TJ by T&FN; #9 U.S. at LJ.

1987: best of 56–0...3rd in NCAA Indoor LJ...2nd in NCAA...7th in USA Champs...2nd in World University Games...ranked #7 U.S. at TJ by T&FN.

1986: best of 56–0...won NCAA Indoor LJ...won NCAA (56–0); 6th in LJ...4th in USA Champs...ranked #4 U.S. at TJ by T&FN; #6 U.S. at LJ.

1985: best of 53–5.5...7th in NCAA Indoor; 5th in LJ.

1984: best of 54–1.75...11th in NCAA...22nd in qualifying at Olympic Trials...won USA Juniors...silver in Pan-Am Juniors.

1983: best of 52–4.5...2nd at Golden West (52–4.5).

1982: best of 48–8.5.

=== Competition Record ===
Year	Tournament	Venue	Result	Distance (meters)	Notes
1989	USA Indoor Championships	United States	6th		SB of 17.45m. Ranked #4 in world at TJ by T&FN
1990	USA Indoor Championships	United States	1st	16.76	SB of 17.93m Ranked #1 in world at TJ by T&FN
1990	USA Outdoor Championships	Norwalk, California	1st	17.15	SB of 17.93m Ranked #1 in world at TJ by T&FN
1990	Goodwill Games	Seattle, Washington	1st	17.71	SB of 17.93m Ranked #1 in world at TJ by T&FN
1991	USA Outdoor Championships	New York, New York	1st	17.28	Ranked #1 in world at TJ by T&FN
1991	World Championships	Tokyo, Japan	1st	17.78 (SB)	Ranked #1 in world at TJ by T&FN
1993	USA Outdoor Championships	Eugene, Oregon	2nd	17.27 (SB)	
1993	World Championships	Stuttgart, Germany	10th	17.06	
1994	USA Outdoor Championships	Knoxville, Tennessee	2nd		SB of 17.43m. Ranked #2 in world at TJ by T&FN
1995	USA Indoor Championships	United States	2nd	16.99	SB of 17.05m.
1996	Summer Olympics	Atlanta, Georgia	1st	18.09 (SB, AR, OR)	PB, AR, OR Ranked #2 in world at TJ by T&FN
1996	IAAF Grand Prix Final	Milan, Italy	3rd	17.21	PB, AR, OR Ranked #2 in world at TJ by T&FN
1997	USA Outdoor Championships	Indianapolis, Indiana	1st	16.97	SB of 17.51m. Ranked #4 in world at TJ by T&FN
1997	World Championships	Athens, Greece	9th	17.05	SB of 17.51m. Ranked #4 in world at TJ by T&FN
1998	Goodwill Games	New York, New York	8th	16.53	SB of 17.05m.

- SB - Season best
- PB - Personal best
- AR - American record
- OR - Olympic record
