= Vera Sychugova =

Russian sprinter

Personal information
- Born: October 16, 1963 (age 62)
Medal record
Women's athletics
Representing Russia
IAAF World Championships in Athletics
Silver medal – second place	Stuggart 1993	4 × 400 m

Vera Sychugova (born October 16, 1963), also known as Vera Zaytseva, is a retired professional sprinter from Russia. She won a silver medal in the 4 × 400 m at the 1993 World Championships in Athletics by virtue of running for her team in the preliminary rounds. Her personal best for 400 m was 51.64 seconds, set in Tallinn, Estonia on July 5, 1988.

At the 1994 European Cup in Athletics, Sychugova ran the entire second leg of a 4 × 400 m relay in her lane rather than cutting in to the track to save distance as IAAF rules permit. As a result of this mistake, her Russian team lost their lead to Britain and ultimately finished third.
