= André Müller =

East German long jumper

André Müller (born 15 November 1970, in Bergen auf Rügen) is a retired East German long jumper.

Müller represented the sports club SC Empor Rostock, and became East German champion in 1990. His personal best jump was 8.11 metres, achieved in August 1990 in Dresden.

== Achievements ==
Year	Competition	Venue	Position	Notes
Representing East Germany
1988	World Junior Championships	Sudbury, Canada	6th	7.63 m w (wind: +2.3 m/s)
1990	European Championships	Split, Yugoslavia	13th (q)	7.85 m (wind: +1.4 m/s)
Representing Germany
1991	World Indoor Championships	Seville, Spain	8th	7.75 m
1991	World Championships	Tokyo, Japan	10th	7.94 m w
1993	World Championships	Stuttgart, Germany	9th	7.83 m
