= Georges Sainte-Rose =

French triple jumper

Medal record

Men's athletics

Representing Martinique

CARIFTA Games Junior (U20)
Silver medal – second place	1988 Kingston	Triple Jump

CARIFTA Games Youth (U17)
Gold medal – first place	1985 Bridgetown	Triple Jump

Georges Sainte-Rose (born 3 September 1969 in Fort-de-France, Martinique) is a retired French triple jumper. He formerly represented Martinique.

His cousins Robert Sainte-Rose and Lucien Sainte-Rose have won international medals in athletics as well.

== Achievements ==
Year	Competition	Venue	Position	Event	Notes
Representing France
1987	European Junior Championships	Birmingham, United Kingdom	3rd	Triple jump	16.30 m (w)
1988	World Junior Championships	Sudbury, Canada	5th (q)	Triple jump	16.08 m (wind: +0.6 m/s)
1990	European Championships	Split, Yugoslavia	7th	Triple jump	16.81 m (wind: +1.3 m/s)
1991	World Championships	Tokyo, Japan	8th	Triple jump	16.92 m
1992	Olympic Games	Barcelona, Spain	19th	Triple jump	16.50 m
1993	Mediterranean Games	Narbonne, France	2nd	Triple jump	17.00 m (w)
1993	World Championships	Stuttgart, Germany	17th (q)	Triple jump	16.84 m
1994	European Indoor Championships	Paris, France	6th	Triple jump	16.96 m
1994	European Championships	Helsinki, Finland	7th	Triple jump	16.59 m (wind: +1.3 m/s)
1995	World Championships	Gothenburg, Sweden	17th (q)	Triple jump	16.52 m
1997	World Indoor Championships	Paris, France	10th	Triple jump	16.41 m
1997	World Championships	Athens, Greece	28th (q)	Triple jump	16.32 m
1998	European Indoor Championships	Valencia, Spain	11th	Triple jump	16.49 m
