= 1988 World Junior Championships in Athletics – Men's long jump =

The men's long jump event at the 1988 World Junior Championships in Athletics was held in Sudbury, Ontario, Canada, at Laurentian University Stadium on 28 and 29 July.

== Medalists ==
Gold	Luis Bueno; Cuba
Silver	Saul Isalgue; Cuba
Bronze	Nai Hui-Fang; Chinese Taipei

== Results ==
=== Final ===
29 July

Rank	Name	Nationality	Attempts						Result	Notes
Rank	Name	Nationality	1	2	3	4	5	6	Result	Notes
1st place, gold medalist(s)	Luis Bueno	Cuba	7.86 (w: NWI)	x	7.99 (w: -1.1 m/s)	7.96 (w: NWI)	7.65 (w: NWI)	7.67 (w: NWI)	7.99 (w: -1.1 m/s)	
2nd place, silver medalist(s)	Saul Isalgue	Cuba	7.78 (w: +0.5 m/s)	7.76 (w: NWI)	7.70 (w: NWI)	7.70 (w: NWI)	7.48 (w: NWI)	x	7.78 (w: +0.5 m/s)	
3rd place, bronze medalist(s)	Nai Hui-Fang	Chinese Taipei	7.77 w (w: +2.8 m/s)	x	7.54 (w: -0.4 m/s)	7.32 (w: NWI)	7.49 (w: NWI)	7.54 (w: NWI)	7.77 w (w: +2.8 m/s)	
4	Stewart Faulkner	United Kingdom	7.59 (w: +0.7 m/s)	7.74 w (w: +2.3 m/s)	x	x	x	7.56 (w: NWI)	7.74 w (w: +2.3 m/s)	
5	Alan Turner	United States	7.66 (w: +1.6 m/s)	7.34 (w: NWI)	7.11 (w: NWI)	7.36 (w: NWI)	7.28 (w: NWI)	7.13 (w: NWI)	7.66 (w: +1.6 m/s)	
6	André Müller	East Germany	7.63 w (w: +2.3 m/s)	2.44 (w: NWI)	7.37 (w: NWI)	7.45 (w: NWI)	7.52 (w: -0.7 m/s)	7.48 (w: NWI)	7.63 w (w: +2.3 m/s)	
7	Rudi Vanlancker	Belgium	7.35 (w: NWI)	x	x	7.48 (w: -0.5 m/s)	x	7.28 (w: NWI)	7.48 (w: -0.5 m/s)	
8	Kostas Koukodimos	Greece	7.42 (w: +1.2 m/s)	x	x	7.25 (w: NWI)	7.25 (w: NWI)	7.06 (w: NWI)	7.42 (w: +1.2 m/s)	
9	Milko Campus	Italy	7.34 w (w: +2.2 m/s)	x	x				7.34 w (w: +2.2 m/s)	
10	René Zeman	Austria	7.23 (w: +1.1 m/s)	x	7.11 (w: NWI)				7.23 (w: +1.1 m/s)	
11	Dirk Holtfreter	West Germany	x	7.13 w (w: +2.6 m/s)	x				7.13 w (w: +2.6 m/s)	
12	Joël Plagnol	France	5.51 (w: NWI)	5.48 (w: NWI)	7.06 (w: -1.4 m/s)				7.06 (w: -1.4 m/s)	

=== Qualifications ===
28 Jul

==== Group A ====
Rank	Name	Nationality	Attempts			Result	Notes
Rank	Name	Nationality	1	2	3	Result	Notes
1	Saul Isalgue	Cuba	7.48 (w: +1.4 m/s)	-	-	7.48 (w: +1.4 m/s)	q
2	Nai Hui-Fang	Chinese Taipei	7.42 (w: -0.9 m/s)	-	-	7.42 (w: -0.9 m/s)	q
3	Dirk Holtfreter	West Germany	6.74 (w: NWI)	7.38 (w: -1.2 m/s)	7.34 (w: NWI)	7.38 (w: -1.2 m/s)	q
4	René Zeman	Austria	7.09 (w: NWI)	7.35 (w: -2.2 m/s)	7.18 (w: NWI)	7.35 (w: -2.2 m/s)	q
5	Rudi Vanlancker	Belgium	x	7.01 (w: NWI)	7.34 (w: -1.5 m/s)	7.34 (w: -1.5 m/s)	q
6	Kostas Koukodimos	Greece	x	7.14 (w: NWI)	7.29 (w: -0.5 m/s)	7.29 (w: -0.5 m/s)	q
7	Milko Campus	Italy	x	7.27 (w: -0.8 m/s)	7.12 (w: NWI)	7.27 (w: -0.8 m/s)	q
8	Jason Canning	United Kingdom	6.91 (w: NWI)	x	7.23 (w: -2.7 m/s)	7.23 (w: -2.7 m/s)	
9	Hans-Peter Lott	West Germany	x	x	7.08 (w: -1.8 m/s)	7.08 (w: -1.8 m/s)	
10	Eric Yuma Mbayo	Belgium	x	7.03 (w: -2.4 m/s)	6.81 (w: NWI)	7.03 (w: -2.4 m/s)	
11	Hsu Mu-Ching	Chinese Taipei	6.95 (w: +1.2 m/s)	x	x	6.95 (w: +1.2 m/s)	
12	Marcel Richardson	United States	x	6.88 (w: -1.4 m/s)	x	6.88 (w: -1.4 m/s)	
13	Angelo Iannuzzelli	El Salvador	x	6.86 (w: -2.1 m/s)	6.74 (w: NWI)	6.86 (w: -2.1 m/s)	
14	Kareem Streete-Thompson	Cayman Islands	6.69 (w: NWI)	6.84 (w: -0.6 m/s)	6.49 (w: NWI)	6.84 (w: -0.6 m/s)	
15	Paulo de Oliveira	Brazil	6.64 (w: NWI)	6.71 (w: -0.9 m/s)	6.43 (w: NWI)	6.71 (w: -0.9 m/s)	
16	Sizwe Mdluli	Swaziland	6.59 (w: -1.4 m/s)	6.47 (w: NWI)	-	6.59 (w: -1.4 m/s)	
17	Percy Larame	Seychelles	6.50 (w: NWI)	6.55 (w: -1.7 m/s)	6.28 (w: NWI)	6.55 (w: -1.7 m/s)	
18	Cheikh Tidiane Touré	Senegal	x	6.49 (w: -1.4 m/s)	-	6.49 (w: -1.4 m/s)	
19	Gabrieli Qoro	Fiji	6.17 (w: -1.2 m/s)	6.15 (w: NWI)	5.84 (w: NWI)	6.17 (w: -1.2 m/s)	
20	Windell Dobson	Jamaica	x	x	6.08 (w: -1.9 m/s)	6.08 (w: -1.9 m/s)	

==== Group B ====
Rank	Name	Nationality	Attempts			Result	Notes
Rank	Name	Nationality	1	2	3	Result	Notes
1	Stewart Faulkner	United Kingdom	7.54 (w: -1.3 m/s)	-	-	7.54 (w: -1.3 m/s)	q
2	Luis Bueno	Cuba	7.37 (w: -1.8 m/s)	7.46 (w: -1.5 m/s)	-	7.46 (w: -1.5 m/s)	q
3	Alan Turner	United States	7.38 (w: +0.6 m/s)	7.25 (w: -1.4 m/s)	7.13 (w: -1.2 m/s)	7.38 (w: +0.6 m/s)	q
4	André Müller	East Germany	7.38 (w: -1.6 m/s)	7.21 (w: -2.9 m/s)	7.19 (w: -2.4 m/s)	7.38 (w: -1.6 m/s)	q
5	Joël Plagnol	France	7.27 (w: +1.1 m/s)	7.20 (w: -2.3 m/s)	6.85 (w: -1.1 m/s)	7.27 (w: +1.1 m/s)	q
6	Bisser Popov	Bulgaria	6.96 (w: -0.5 m/s)	7.21 (w: -2.1 m/s)	7.25 (w: -1.7 m/s)	7.25 (w: -1.7 m/s)	
7	Sadahiro Ando	Japan	x	7.23 (w: -0.7 m/s)	x	7.23 (w: -0.7 m/s)	
8	Manfred Auinger	Austria	x	x	7.19 (w: -1.4 m/s)	7.19 (w: -1.4 m/s)	
9	Andrey Yegorov	Soviet Union	6.96 (w: +1.0 m/s)	6.71 (w: -1.7 m/s)	7.11 (w: -1.4 m/s)	7.11 (w: -1.4 m/s)	
10	Roberto Coltri	Italy	6.89 (w: -2.0 m/s)	x	6.87 (w: -2.1 m/s)	6.89 (w: -2.0 m/s)	
11	Darren Hosking	Australia	5.15 (w: +0.2 m/s)	6.33 (w: -1.2 m/s)	6.84 (w: -1.8 m/s)	6.84 (w: -1.8 m/s)	
12	Hiroyuki Fujisawa	Japan	6.79 (w: +0.8 m/s)	6.58 (w: -1.1 m/s)	6.42 (w: -2.8 m/s)	6.79 (w: +0.8 m/s)	
13	Mark Mason	Guyana	x	-	6.77 (w: -0.7 m/s)	6.77 (w: -0.7 m/s)	
14	Lynten Johnson	Australia	x	x	6.75 (w: -2.9 m/s)	6.75 (w: -2.9 m/s)	
15	Nadir Si Mohamed	Algeria	6.62 (w: -0.5 m/s)	6.46 (w: -2.4 m/s)	6.52 (w: -1.7 m/s)	6.62 (w: -0.5 m/s)	
16	Banolo Barie	Botswana	6.05 (w: +0.2 m/s)	5.63 (w: -1.7 m/s)	6.28 (w: -0.7 m/s)	6.28 (w: -0.7 m/s)	
17	Franck Zio	Burkina Faso	5.80 (w: +0.5 m/s)	x	5.56 (w: -0.7 m/s)	5.80 (w: +0.5 m/s)	
	Jean-Charles Odon Achy	Côte d'Ivoire	x	x	x	NM	

== Participation ==
According to an unofficial count, 38 athletes from 28 countries participated in the event.

- Algeria (1)
- Australia (2)
- Austria (2)
- Belgium (2)
- Botswana (1)
- Brazil (1)
- Bulgaria (1)
- Burkina Faso (1)
- Cayman Islands (1)
- Chinese Taipei (2)
- Côte d'Ivoire (1)
- Cuba (2)
- East Germany (1)
- El Salvador (1)
- Fiji (1)
- France (1)
- Greece (1)
- Guyana (1)
- Italy (2)
- Jamaica (1)
- Japan (2)
- Senegal (1)
- Seychelles (1)
- Soviet Union (1)
- Swaziland (1)
- United Kingdom (2)
- United States (2)
- West Germany (2)
