= Steve Conley (linebacker) =

American gridiron football player (born 1972)

No. 53, 94, 92
- Position: Linebacker

Personal information
- Born: January 18, 1972 (age 54); Chicago, Illinois, U.S.
- Listed height: 6 ft 5 in (1.96 m)
- Listed weight: 235 lb (107 kg)

Career information
- High school: Luther High School South (Chicago)
- College: Arkansas
- NFL draft: 1996: 3rd round, 72nd overall pick

Career history
- Pittsburgh Steelers (1996–1997); Indianapolis Colts (1998); Pittsburgh Steelers (1998); Carolina Panthers (1999)*; Saskatchewan Roughriders (1999); Chicago Enforcers (2001)
- * Offseason or practice squad member only

Awards and highlights
- First-team All-SEC (1995); Arkansas Razorbacks single season sack leader (14), 1995

Career NFL statistics
- Tackles: 6
- Sacks: 4.0
- Interceptions: 1
- Stats at Pro Football Reference

Donald Steven Conley (born January 18, 1972) is an American former professional football player who was a linebacker in the National Football League (NFL). He was selected in the third round of the 1996 NFL draft with the 72nd overall pick. Conley played for the Pittsburgh Steelers and the Indianapolis Colts in his three-year NFL career. He also played in the Canadian Football League (CFL) and the XFL.

Conley attended the University of Arkansas, where he was named 1st team All-SEC as a senior in 1995 after tying the Arkansas single-season QB sack record with 14. Conley helped the Razorbacks win the 1995 SEC Western Division championship, the school's first division title.

Conley is the younger brother of Olympic medalist Mike Conley Sr., and the uncle of former Ohio State basketball player, and current Boston Celtics point guard Mike Conley Jr.

Conley has appeared on the TLC TV series 19 Kids and Counting and Counting On as a friend of the Duggar family.
