= Anísio Silva =

Brazilian triple jumper

Personal information
- Born: 18 June 1969 (age 57) Guarulhos, São Paulo, Brazil

Sport
- Sport: Track and field
Medal record
Representing Brazil
Pan American Games
Silver medal – second place	1991 Havana	Triple jump

Anísio Souza Silva (born 18 June 1969) is a retired triple jumper from Brazil, who won the silver medal in the men's triple jump at the 1991 Pan American Games in Havana, Cuba. He represented his native country at two consecutive Summer Olympics, starting in 1992.

== Achievements ==
Year	Competition	Venue	Position	Event	Notes
Representing Brazil
1988	South American Junior Championships	Cubatão, Brazil	2nd	4 × 100 metres relay	41.48 s
1988	South American Junior Championships	Cubatão, Brazil	2nd	Long jump	6.99 m
1988	South American Junior Championships	Cubatão, Brazil	1st	Triple jump	15.94 m
1988	World Junior Championships	Sudbury, Canada	8th	Triple jump	15.53 m w (+3.0 m/s)
1990	Ibero-American Championships	Manaus, Brazil	1st	Triple jump	16.71 m
1991	World Indoor Championships	Seville, Spain	22nd (q)	Triple jump	16.22 m
1991	South American Championships	Manaus, Brazil	1st	Triple jump	16.15 m
1991	Pan American Games	Havana, Cuba	2nd	Triple jump	16.72 m
1991	World Championships	Tokyo, Japan	26th (q)	Triple jump	16.18 m
1992	Ibero-American Championships	Seville, Spain	2nd	Triple jump	16.40 m (+0.3 m/s)
1992	Olympic Games	Barcelona, Spain	29th (q)	Triple jump	16.03 m
1993	South American Championships	Lima, Peru	6th	Long jump	7.27 m
1993	South American Championships	Lima, Peru	1st	Triple jump	17.21 m
1993	World Championships	Stuttgart, Germany	7th	Triple jump	17.19 m
1994	Ibero-American Championships	Mar del Plata, Argentina	1st	Triple jump	16.66 m (+0.7 m/s)
1995	World Indoor Championships	Barcelona, Spain	18th (q)	Triple jump	16.19 m
1995	Pan American Games	Mar del Plata, Argentina	5th	Triple jump	16.61 m (w)
1995	World Championships	Gothenburg, Sweden	–	Triple jump	NM
1996	Olympic Games	Atlanta, United States	18th (q)	Triple jump	16.67 m
1997	World Indoor Championships	Paris, France	22nd (q)	Triple jump	16.22 m
1997	South American Championships	Mar del Plata, Argentina	1st	Triple jump	16.24 m
1999	South American Championships	Bogotá, Colombia	1st	Triple jump	16.48 m
2003	South American Championships	Barquisimeto, Venezuela	2nd	Triple jump	16.22 m
