= Oleg Denishchik =

Oleg Denishchik (Belarusian: Алег Дзянішчык; born 10 November 1969) is a retired triple jumper who represented the USSR and later Belarus. His personal best jump was 17.53 metres, achieved in July 1991 in Kyiv. He twice competed at the World Championships in Athletics, reaching the final on both occasions. He was a one-time national champion at the Belarusian Athletics Championships, winning the men's triple jump in 1993. He was runner-up at the 1991 Soviet Athletics Championships.

== International competitions ==
Year	Competition	Venue	Position	Notes
1991	World Championships	Tokyo, Japan	10th	16.61 m
1993	World Championships	Stuttgart, Germany	13th	16.61 m

== National titles ==
- Belarusian Athletics Championships
  - Triple jump: 1993
