= 1988 World Junior Championships in Athletics – Men's triple jump =

The men's triple jump event at the 1988 World Junior Championships in Athletics was held in Sudbury, Ontario, Canada, at Laurentian University Stadium on 30 and 31 July.

== Medalists ==
Gold	Vladimir Melikhov; Soviet Union
Silver	Galin Georgiev; Bulgaria
Bronze	Eugene Greene; Bahamas

== Results ==
=== Final ===
31 July

Rank	Name	Nationality	Attempts						Result	Notes
Rank	Name	Nationality	1	2	3	4	5	6	Result	Notes
1st place, gold medalist(s)	Vladimir Melikhov	Soviet Union	16.49 (w: +1.4 m/s)	16.69 (w: +1.6 m/s)	x	x	-	x	16.69 (w: +1.6 m/s)	
2nd place, silver medalist(s)	Galin Georgiev	Bulgaria	15.85 (w: +1.9 m/s)	15.78 w (w: +2.2 m/s)	16.14 (w: +0.4 m/s)	15.34 (w: +0.6 m/s)	15.34 w (w: +2.2 m/s)	16.18 (w: +1.8 m/s)	16.18 (w: +1.8 m/s)	
3rd place, bronze medalist(s)	Eugene Greene	Bahamas	x	16.07 w (w: +3.0 m/s)	16.16 (w: +1.2 m/s)	15.90 (w: +0.5 m/s)	15.50 (w: +0.4 m/s)	15.01 (w: +0.5 m/s)	16.16 (w: +1.2 m/s)	
4	Nai Hui-Fang	Chinese Taipei	16.12 w (w: +2.8 m/s)	x	15.51 w (w: +2.3 m/s)	14.88 (w: +1.1 m/s)	15.74 (w: +0.5 m/s)	15.56 (w: +1.3 m/s)	16.12 w (w: +2.8 m/s)	
5	Juan Carlos Ibáñez	Cuba	x	16.07 w (w: +2.8 m/s)	x	x	x	15.52 (w: +0.8 m/s)	16.07 w (w: +2.8 m/s)	
6	Alex Norca	France	15.94 (w: +1.5 m/s)	15.87 (w: +0.6 m/s)	15.16 (w: +1.4 m/s)	15.34 (w: -0.3 m/s)	15.65 (w: -0.6 m/s)	x	15.94 (w: +1.5 m/s)	
7	Yuriy Osypenko	Soviet Union	15.83 (w: +1.7 m/s)	x	x	15.29 (w: NWI)	15.63 (w: NWI)	15.57 (w: +1.3 m/s)	15.83 (w: +1.7 m/s)	
8	Anísio Silva	Brazil	x	15.53 w (w: +3.0 m/s)	15.39 (w: +1.0 m/s)	13.02 (w: NWI)	x	-	15.53 w (w: +3.0 m/s)	
9	Stoyko Tsonov	Bulgaria	15.48 w (w: +2.1 m/s)	x	15.45 w (w: +2.5 m/s)				15.48 w (w: +2.1 m/s)	
10	Andrew Murphy	Australia	15.09 (w: +0.2 m/s)	x	15.24 (w: +0.3 m/s)				15.24 (w: +0.3 m/s)	
	Li Hong	China	x	x	x				NM	
	Georges Sainte-Rose	France	x	x	x				NM	

=== Qualifications ===
30 Jul

==== Group A ====
Rank	Name	Nationality	Attempts			Result	Notes
Rank	Name	Nationality	1	2	3	Result	Notes
1	Vladimir Melikhov	Soviet Union	16.52 w (w: +2.4 m/s)	-	-	16.52 w (w: +2.4 m/s)	Q
2	Anísio Silva	Brazil	16.00 (w: +1.9 m/s)	-	-	16.00 (w: +1.9 m/s)	Q
3	Andrew Murphy	Australia	15.91 w (w: +3.7 m/s)	-	-	15.91 w (w: +3.7 m/s)	Q
4	Alex Norca	France	x	15.88 w (w: +2.3 m/s)	-	15.88 w (w: +2.3 m/s)	Q
5	Galin Georgiev	Bulgaria	x	x	15.75 (w: +1.5 m/s)	15.75 (w: +1.5 m/s)	Q
6	Reginald Jackson	United States	x	15.55 (w: +1.0 m/s)	15.26 (w: NWI)	15.55 (w: +1.0 m/s)	
7	Robin Hernández	Cuba	15.14 (w: NWI)	x	15.53 (w: +0.8 m/s)	15.53 (w: +0.8 m/s)	
8	Burlington Moss	Bahamas	15.10 (w: +1.8 m/s)	15.39 w (w: +2.7 m/s)	15.37 (w: NWI)	15.39 w (w: +2.7 m/s)	
9	Liu Tsung-Te	Chinese Taipei	15.16 (w: NWI)	15.30 (w: +1.4 m/s)	x	15.30 (w: +1.4 m/s)	
10	Frederic Stockis	Belgium	15.12 w (w: +3.4 m/s)	x	x	15.12 w (w: +3.4 m/s)	
11	Gian Luca Dianese	Italy	14.82 (w: +0.9 m/s)	x	x	14.82 (w: +0.9 m/s)	

==== Group B ====
Rank	Name	Nationality	Attempts			Result	Notes
Rank	Name	Nationality	1	2	3	Result	Notes
1	Juan Carlos Ibáñez	Cuba	16.26 w (w: +3.4 m/s)	-	-	16.26 w (w: +3.4 m/s)	Q
2	Li Hong	China	13.95 (w: NWI)	x	16.23 w (w: +2.6 m/s)	16.23 w (w: +2.6 m/s)	Q
3	Nai Hui-Fang	Chinese Taipei	16.14 w (w: +2.3 m/s)	-	-	16.14 w (w: +2.3 m/s)	Q
4	Georges Sainte-Rose	France	x	16.08 (w: +0.6 m/s)	-	16.08 (w: +0.6 m/s)	Q
5	Eugene Greene	Bahamas	16.04 w (w: +3.6 m/s)	-	-	16.04 w (w: +3.6 m/s)	Q
6	Yuriy Osypenko	Soviet Union	14.33 (w: NWI)	15.93 w (w: +5.0 m/s)	-	15.93 w (w: +5.0 m/s)	Q
7	Stoyko Tsonov	Bulgaria	15.48 (w: NWI)	15.38 (w: NWI)	15.68 (w: -0.5 m/s)	15.68 (w: -0.5 m/s)	Q
8	Paulo de Oliveira	Brazil	15.55 w (w: +4.0 m/s)	15.21 (w: +1.2 m/s)	15.17 (w: NWI)	15.55 w (w: +4.0 m/s)	
9	Hiroyuki Fujisawa	Japan	15.43 w (w: +4.7 m/s)	15.23 (w: +1.5 m/s)	15.10 (w: NWI)	15.43 w (w: +4.7 m/s)	
10	McArthur Anderson	United States	x	14.48 (w: +1.2 m/s)	15.22 w (w: +2.4 m/s)	15.22 w (w: +2.4 m/s)	
11	Saleh Zaid Al-Mass	Bahrain	14.84 w (w: +3.3 m/s)	x	x	14.84 w (w: +3.3 m/s)	

== Participation ==
According to an unofficial count, 22 athletes from 14 countries participated in the event.

- Australia (1)
- Bahamas (2)
- Bahrain (1)
- Belgium (1)
- Brazil (2)
- Bulgaria (2)
- China (1)
- Chinese Taipei (2)
- Cuba (2)
- France (2)
- Italy (1)
- Japan (1)
- Soviet Union (2)
- United States (2)
