= Ralf Jaros =

German triple jumper (born 1965)

Ralf Jaros (born 13 December 1965 in Düsseldorf) is a former German triple jumper. With a height of 1.93 m (6 ft 4 in), he had a competition weight of 85 kg (187 lb).

On 30 June 1991, in the European Cup, Ralf Jaros set a German triple jump record of 17.66 meters (57 ft 11 in) while defeating the nearest competitor by nearly 72 cm (28 in). This remains the current national record in the event.

At the age of 18, Ralf Jaros made his international debut in the 1984 Olympic Games. He finished in the seventeenth position in the qualification round. In the 1985 season, he finished fourth in the European Indoor Championships with a distance of 16.78 meters (55 ft 1 in), and sixth in the World Indoor Games with a distance of 16.61 meters (54 ft 6 in). Knee injuries prevented Jaros from taking part in international competition for some years following these events.

He finished ninth in the 1991 World Championships. In the 1992 Olympic Games, he narrowly failed to qualify for the final round, ranking thirteenth in qualification. He finished fourth in the 1993 World Championships with a distance of 17.34 meters (56 ft 11 in).

Jaros was German outdoor champion in the triple jump in 1984 and 1985 as well as 1990 to 1993. He was German indoor champion in the event in 1984, 1985 and 1994. He represented the clubs DJK Agon Düsseldorf and TV Wattenscheid.

== International competitions ==
Year	Competition	Venue	Position	Event	Notes
Representing West Germany
1983	European Junior Championships	Schwechat, Austria	7th	Triple jump	16.01 m
1984	European Indoor Championships	Gothenburg, Sweden	7th	Triple jump	16.48 m
1984	Olympic Games	Los Angeles, United States	17th	Triple jump	16.02 m
1985	World Indoor Games	Paris, France	6th	Triple jump	16.61 m
1985	European Indoor Championships	Piraeus, Greece	4th	Triple jump	16.78 m
1990	European Indoor Championships	Glasgow, United Kingdom	22nd	Long jump	7.16 m
1990	European Championships	Split, Yugoslavia	12th	Triple jump	16.24 m
Representing Germany
1991	World Championships	Tokyo, Japan	9th	Triple jump	16.76 m
1992	Olympic Games	Barcelona, Spain	13th	Triple jump	16.89 m
1993	World Championships	Stuttgart, Germany	4th	Triple jump	17.34 m
1994	European Indoor Championships	Paris, France	7th	Triple jump	16.78 m
