= Wendell Lawrence =

Bahamian triple jumper

Personal information
- Born: 6 July 1967 (age 58)

Sport
- Sport: Track and field
Medal record
Representing Bahamas
Pan American Games
Bronze medal – third place	1991 Havana	Triple jump
CARIFTA Games Junior (U20)
Gold medal – first place	1984 Nassau	Triple jump
Bronze medal – third place	1985 Bridgetown	Triple jump

Wendell Lawrence (born July 6, 1967) is a retired male triple jumper from the Bahamas, best known for finishing 17th at the 1992 Olympic Games. He set his personal best (17.20 m) in 1992.

He attended Boise State University where he was an All-American. He was inducted into the Boise State Hall of Fame in 1996.

== Achievements ==
Year	Competition	Venue	Position	Event	Notes
Representing Bahamas
1991	Central American and Caribbean Championships	Xalapa, Mexico	1st	Triple jump	16.79 m
1991	Pan American Games	Havana, Cuba	3rd	Triple jump	16.69 m
1992	Olympic Games	Barcelona, Spain	17th	Triple jump	16.70 m
