= Banarus Muhammad Khan =

Pakistani athlete (born 1969)

Personal information
- Nationality: Pakistani
- Born: 31 August 1969 (age 57)

Sport
- Sport: Athletics
- Events: Triple jump, Long jump
Medal record
Men's athletics
Representing Pakistan
South Asian Games
| Gold medal – first place | 1991 Colombo | Triple jump |
| Silver medal – second place | 1993 Dhaka | Long jump |
| Bronze medal – third place | 1999 Kathmandu | Long jump |
| Bronze medal – third place | 1999 Kathmandu | Triple jump |
| Bronze medal – third place | 1995 Madras | Triple jump |
South Asian Championships
| Bronze medal – third place | 1998 Colombo | 4×100m |
| Bronze medal – third place | 1997 New Delhi | Long Jump |

Banarus Muhammad Khan (born 31 August 1969) is a Pakistani Triple jumper and Long jumper. He competed in the men's triple jump at the 1992 Summer Olympics. He also competed in both the long jump and the triple jump at the 1993 World Championships in Athletics in Stuttgart, Germany.

Khan set his best mark in June 1992 to win a meeting in Islamabad, triple jumping 15.93 m. At the 1992 Olympics, Khan finished 41st with a 15.37 m mark on his last attempt. The following year, Khan improved to 18th in the long jump, and finished 21st in the triple jump at the 1993 World Championships. He won the bronze medal in the triple jump at the 1999 South Asian Games, jumping 15.57 m.

== See also ==
- List of Pakistani records in athletics
- Athletics in Pakistan
- Pakistan at the Olympics
