= 1990 European Athletics Championships – Men's triple jump =

Men's triple jump at the European Athletics Championships

The Men's Triple Jump event at the 1990 European Championships in Split, Yugoslavia was held at Stadion Poljud on 30 and 31 August 1990. There were a total number of nineteen participating athletes.

== Medalists ==
Gold	Leonid Voloshin; Soviet Union (URS)
Silver	Khristo Markov; Bulgaria (BUL)
Bronze	Igor Lapshin; Soviet Union (URS)

== Abbreviations ==
- All results shown are in metres

Q	automatic qualification
q	qualification by rank
DNS	did not start
NM	no mark
WR	world record
AR	area record
NR	national record
PB	personal best
SB	season best

== Records ==
Standing records prior to the 1990 European Athletics Championships
World Record	Willie Banks (USA)	17.97 m	June 16, 1985	Indianapolis, United States
Event Record	Khristo Markov (BUL)	17.66 m	August 30, 1986	Stuttgart, West Germany
Broken records during the 1990 European Athletics Championships
Event Record	Leonid Voloshin (URS)	17.74 m	August 31, 1990	(Socialist Federal Republic of Yugoslavia) Split, Yugoslavia

== Results ==
=== Final ===
31 August

Rank	Name	Nationality	Attempts						Result	Notes
Rank	Name	Nationality	1	2	3	4	5	6	Result	Notes
1st place, gold medalist(s)	Leonid Voloshin	Soviet Union							17.74 (w: 0.8 m/s)	CR
2nd place, silver medalist(s)	Khristo Markov	Bulgaria							17.43 (w: 1.1 m/s)	
3rd place, bronze medalist(s)	Igor Lapshin	Soviet Union							17.34 (w: 0.0 m/s)	
4	Jörg Frieß	East Germany							17.01 (w: 0.0 m/s)	
5	Volker Mai	East Germany							16.88 (w: -0.2 m/s)	
6	Andrzej Grabarczyk	Poland							16.82 (w: 1.5 m/s)	
7	Georges Sainte-Rose	France							16.81 (w: 1.3 m/s)	
8	Oleg Protsenko	Soviet Union							16.80 (w: 1.3 m/s)	
9	John Herbert	United Kingdom							16.73 (w: -1.0 m/s)	
10	Marios Hadjiandreou	Cyprus							16.63 (w: 1.5 m/s)	
11	Eugeniusz Bedeniczuk	Poland							16.60 (w: 1.3 m/s)	
12	Ralf Jaros	West Germany							16.24 (w: 1.6 m/s)	

=== Qualification ===
30 August
Qualification distance: 16.90 (Q) or 12 best (q) qualified for the final

==== Group A ====
Rank	Name	Nationality	Result	Notes
1	Oleg Protsenko	Soviet Union	17.41 (w: 1.6 m/s)	Q
2	Igor Lapshin	Soviet Union	17.11 (w: 1.6 m/s)	Q
3	Georges Sainte-Rose	France	16.88 (w: 1.3 m/s)	q
4	Volker Mai	East Germany	16.88 (w: 1.3 m/s)	q
5	John Herbert	United Kingdom	16.79 (w: 0.7 m/s)	q
6	Ralf Jaros	West Germany	16.75 (w: 1.2 m/s)	q
7	Andrzej Grabarczyk	Poland	16.61 (w: 1 m/s)	q
8	Zoran Đurđević	Yugoslavia	16.45 (w: 1.2 m/s)	
9	Claes Rahm	Sweden	15.98 (w: 1.3 m/s)	

==== Group B ====
Rank	Name	Nationality	Result	Notes
1	Leonid Voloshin	Soviet Union	17.59 (w: 0.9 m/s)	Q
2	Khristo Markov	Bulgaria	16.96 (w: 1.0 m/s)	Q
3	Jörg Frieß	East Germany	16.86 (w: 0.4 m/s)	q
4	Eugeniusz Bedeniczuk	Poland	16.79 (w: 1.3 m/s)	q
5	Marios Hadjiandreou	Cyprus	16.75 (w: 1.5 m/s)	q
6	Didier Falise	Belgium	16.32 (w: 1 m/s)	
7	Pierre Camara	France	16.18 (w: 0.7 m/s)	
8	Rogel Nachum	Israel	16.01 (w: 1.5 m/s)	
9	Tord Henriksson	Sweden	16.00 (w: 0.9 m/s)	
	Serge Hélan	France	NM	

== Participation ==
According to an unofficial count, 19 athletes from 12 countries participated in the event.

- Belgium (1)
- Bulgaria (1)
- Cyprus (1)
- East Germany (2)
- France (3)
- Israel (1)
- Poland (2)
- Soviet Union (3)
- Sweden (2)
- United Kingdom (1)
- West Germany (1)
- Yugoslavia (1)

== See also ==
- 1988 Men's Olympic Triple Jump (Seoul)
- 1991 Men's World Championships Triple Jump (Tokyo)
- 1992 Men's Olympic Triple Jump (Barcelona)
