= Bernhard Kelm =

German long jumper

Bernhard Kelm (born 23 December 1967) is a retired German long jumper.

He competed at the 1993 World Championships, but did not reach the final round. He had won the silver medal at the German championships the same year, representing the sports club TSV Wasserburg. His personal best jump was 8.02 metres, achieved in June 1993 in Bad Homburg.
