= François Fouché =

South African long jumper

Personal information
- Nationality: South African
- Born: 5 June 1963 (age 63)

Sport
- Sport: Athletics
- Event: Long jump
Medal record
Men's athletics
Representing South Africa
African Championships
Silver medal – second place	1992 Belle Vue Harel	Long jump

François Fouché (born 5 June 1963) is a South African athlete. He competed in the men's long jump at the 1996 Summer Olympics, jumping 7.44m to finish 38th during the qualifying round.
