= Santiago Moreno =

Spanish triple jumper

Santiago Moreno Hernando (born 2 February 1964 in San Miguel de Corneja) is a retired Spanish triple jumper. His personal best jump was 16.93 metres, achieved in July 1991 in Ávila. This is the current Spanish record.

== Achievements ==
Year	Competition	Venue	Position	Event	Notes
Representing Spain
1989	European Indoor Championships	The Hague, Netherlands	10th	Triple jump	
1992	European Indoor Championships	Genoa, Italy	13th	Triple jump	
1992	Olympic Games	Barcelona, Spain	28th	Triple jump	16.04 m
