= Chen Yanping =

Chinese triple jumper (born 1966)

Personal information
- Born: January 7, 1966 (age 60)

Sport
- Sport: Track and field
Medal record
Representing China
Asian Games
Gold medal – first place	1990 Beijing	Triple jump
Asian Championships
Gold medal – first place	1989 New Delhi	Triple jump
Gold medal – first place	1991 Kuala Lumpur	Triple jump
Summer Universiade
Silver medal – second place	1991 Sheffield	Triple jump

Chen Yanping (simplified Chinese: 陈燕平; traditional Chinese: 陳燕平; pinyin: Chén Yànpíng; born January 7, 1966) is a Chinese retired triple jumper.

== International competitions ==
Year	Competition	Venue	Position	Event	Notes
Representing China
1988	Olympic Games	Seoul, South Korea	14th	Triple jump	16.25 m
1989	Asian Championships	New Delhi, India	1st	Triple jump	
1990	Asian Games	Beijing, China	1st	Triple jump	
1991	Universiade	Sheffield, United Kingdom	2nd	Triple jump	
1991	Asian Championships	Kuala Lumpur, Malaysia	1st	Triple jump	
1992	Olympic Games	Barcelona, Spain	36th	Triple jump	15.66 m
1993	East Asian Games	Shanghai, China	3rd	Triple jump	
