= Marzouk Al-Yoha =

Kuwaiti athlete (born 1968)

Personal information
- Full name: Marzouk Abdullah Al-Yoha
- Nationality: Kuwaiti
- Born: 23 November 1968 (age 57)

Sport
- Sport: Athletics
- Event: Triple jump
Medal record
Men's athletics
Representing Kuwait
Asian Championships
Bronze medal – third place	1991 Kuala Lumpur	Triple jump

Marzouk Al-Yoha (born 23 November 1968) is a Kuwaiti athlete. He competed in the men's triple jump at the 1988 Summer Olympics and the 1992 Summer Olympics.
