= Petro Sarafyniuk =

Ukrainian long-distance runner

Petro Yakovych Sarafyniuk (Ukrainian: Петро Якович Сарафинюк; born September 28, 1966) is a former long-distance runner from Ukraine, who won the Eindhoven Marathon on October 8, 1995, clocking 2:16:40. He represented his native country at the 1996 Summer Olympics in Atlanta, Georgia, where he finished in 43rd place in the marathon with a total time of 2:20:37.

== Achievements ==
- All results regarding marathon, unless stated otherwise

Year	Competition	Venue	Position	Notes
Representing Ukraine
1995	Eindhoven Marathon	Eindhoven, Netherlands	1st	2:16:40
1996	Olympic Games	Atlanta, United States	43rd	2:20:37
