= Pierre Camara =

French triple jumper

Pierre Camara (born 15 September 1965) is a retired French triple jumper, best known for his triple jump gold medal at the 1993 World Indoor Championships. In the triple jump final of those championships, he jumped 17.59 m, which was a new championship record and a new French indoor record. His French indoor record of 17.59 m was broken in 2010 by Teddy Tamgho. Camara was born in Castres, Tarn.

== International competitions ==
Year	Competition	Venue	Position	Event	Notes
Representing France
1985	European Indoor Championships	Piraeus, Greece	8th	Triple jump	16.07 m
1986	European Indoor Championships	Madrid, Spain	10th	Triple jump	16.28 m
1989	European Indoor Championships	The Hague, Netherlands	7th	Triple jump	16.52 m
1989	Jeux de la Francophonie	Casablanca, Morocco	2nd	Triple jump	16.87 m
1990	European Championships	Split, Yugoslavia	15th (q)	Triple jump	16.18 m (+0.7 m/s)
1991	Mediterranean Games	Athens, Greece	–	Triple jump	NM
1992	Olympic Games	Barcelona, Spain	11th	Triple jump	16.52 m
1993	World Indoor Championships	Toronto, Canada	1st	Triple jump	17.59 m
1993	Mediterranean Games	Narbonne, France	1st	Triple jump	17.03 m
1993	World Championships	Stuttgart, Germany	5th	Triple jump	17.28 m
