= Sergey Melnikov =

Russian middle-distance runner

Personal information
- Born: 8 November 1968 (age 57)

Sport
- Sport: Track and field
Medal record
Representing Unified Team
European Indoor Championships
Silver medal – second place	1992 Genoa	1500 m

Sergey Melnikov (born 8 November 1968) is a retired Russian middle distance runner who specialized in the 1500 metres.

He finished tenth at the 1991 IAAF World Indoor Championships and won a silver medal at the 1992 European Indoor Championships. He competed at the 1991 World Championships, but only reached the semi-final.
