= Frank Rutherford =

Bahamian triple jumper

Frank Rutherford MBE
Personal information
- Born: Frank Garfield Rutherford; 23 November 1964 (age 61)
Medal record
Athletics
Representing Bahamas
Olympic Games
Bronze medal – third place	1992 Barcelona	Triple jump

Frank Garfield Rutherford, Jr. MBE (born November 23, 1964) is a retired triple jumper from the Bahamas. He competed in three Olympic Games, and won a bronze medal in 1992, becoming the first Bahamian Track and Field Olympic medalist. He now runs a program which prepares young Bahamian students to play college basketball and American football in the United States. He was a four-time participant at the World Championships in Athletics.

He attended the University of Houston, where he received Bachelor of Science degrees in Economics and Computer Science. He became the first Bahamian to win more than three NCAA triple jump championships.

Rutherford won the Bahamas its first World Championship medal with a bronze in the 1987 IAAF World Indoor Championships. He was the US Indoor Track and Field champion in the triple jump in 1991 and still currently holds the triple jump record for the University of Houston. He followed that with winning a silver medal at the 1992 World Cup in Havana, Cuba. His personal best was 17.41 metres, a Bahamian record that has later been beaten by Leevan Sands. Rutherford is considered the Olympic pioneer in the Bahamas because he was the first to win medals at the Olympic and World Championship levels. He is considered the Father of Track and Field in the Bahamas.

He started the Frank Rutherford Foundation, a Houston, Texas-based programme to assist young Bahamian sportspeople in gaining academic qualifications through college much like Rutherford. The Foundation's goal is to help the students attain a college scholarship. Two former students of the program are Devard and Devaughn Darling, cousins of Rutherford who both received football scholarships from Florida State University. Others include Jeremy Barr, a power forward who attended the University of Nebraska–Lincoln on a basketball scholarship, and Ian Symmonette, a left tackle who attends the University of Miami on football scholarship. More than 60 Bahamian young people have been helped by Rutherford and his foundation and all of them have graduated from college.

His wife, Milessa Rutherford, runs the family businesses and, along with his mother, administrates the Frank Rutherford Foundation. In the 2003 New Year Honours, Rutherford was appointed a Member of the Order of the British Empire (MBE) for service to sport. He is the cousin of fellow Bahamian track athlete Dennis Darling (husband to Tonique Williams-Darling).

== International competitions ==
Year	Competition	Venue	Position	Event	Notes
Representing Bahamas
1987	World Indoor Championships	Indianapolis, United States	3rd	Triple jump	
1987	Pan American Games	Indianapolis, United States	3rd	Triple jump	
1992	Olympic Games	Barcelona, Spain	3rd	Triple jump	
1996	Olympic Games	Atlanta, United States	11th	Triple jump	16.38 m
1999	Central American and Caribbean Championships	Bridgetown, Barbados	2nd	Triple jump	
