= Leonid Voloshin =

Russian triple jumper (born 1966)

Personal information
- Full name: Leonid Anatolyevich Voloshin
- Born: 30 March 1966 (age 60) Ordzhonikidze, North Ossetian ASSR, Russian SFSR, Soviet Union
Medal record
Men's athletics
Representing Soviet Union
European Championships
Gold medal – first place	1990 Split	Triple jump

Leonid Anatolyevich Voloshin (Russian: Леонид Анатолъевич Волошин; born 30 March 1966 in Ordzhonikidze) is a retired triple jumper from Russia. He competed at the 1988 Summer Olympics and the 1992 Summer Olympics.

== Career ==
Voloshin won the European Championships in 1990 as well as two European Indoor titles. He also won two World Championship silvers, in 1991 and 1993. In Tokyo 1991 he achieved a personal best jump of 17.75 metres, which puts him 18th in the all-time performers list.

In long jump he is ranked 22nd with a personal best jump of 8.46 metres (Russia national record until 2013 when Aleksandr Menkov jumped 8.56 m). He switched to triple jump in 1990.

== Achievements ==
Year	Competition	Venue	Position	Event	Notes
Representing the Soviet Union
1988	Olympic Games	Seoul, South Korea	8th	Long jump	7.89 m
1990	European Championships	Split, Yugoslavia	1st	Triple jump	17.74 m (wind: +0.8 m/s)
1991	World Indoor Championships	Seville, Spain	2nd	Triple jump	17.04 m
1991	World Championships	Tokyo, Japan	2nd	Triple jump	17.75 m PB
Representing the Unified Team
1992	European Indoor Championships	Genoa, Italy	1st	Triple jump	17.35 m
1992	Olympic Games	Barcelona, Spain	4th	Triple jump	17.32 m
Representing Russia
1993	World Championships	Stuttgart, Germany	2nd	Triple jump	17.65 m
1994	European Indoor Championships	Paris, France	1st	Triple jump	17.44 m
