= 1987 World Championships in Athletics – Men's triple jump =

These are the official results of the Men's Triple Jump event at the 1987 IAAF World Championships in Rome, Italy. There were a total of 32 participating athletes, with two qualifying groups and the final held on Monday August 31, 1987.

== Medalists ==
| Gold | Khristo Markov; Bulgaria (BUL) |
| Silver | Mike Conley; United States (USA) |
| Bronze | Oleg Sakirkin; Soviet Union (URS) |

== Schedule ==
- All times are Central European Time (UTC+1)

Qualification Round
| Group A | Group B |
|---|---|
| 30.08.1987 – ??:??h | 30.08.1987 – ??:??h |
Final Round
31.08.1987 – 16:40h

== Records ==
Existing records at the start of the event.

| World record | Willie Banks (USA) | 17.97 | Indianapolis, USA | June 16, 1985 |
| Championship record | Zdzisław Hoffmann (POL) | 17.42 | Helsinki, Finland | August 8, 1983 |

== Final ==
| RANK | FINAL | HEIGHT |
|---|---|---|
| | Khristo Markov (BUL) | 17.92 m CR |
| | Mike Conley (USA) | 17.67 m |
| | Oleg Sakirkin (URS) | 17.43 m |
| 4. | Aleksandr Kovalenko (URS) | 17.38 m |
| 5. | Jacek Pastusiński (POL) | 17.35 m |
| 6. | Joseph Taiwo (NGR) | 17.29 m |
| 7. | Peter Bouschen (FRG) | 17.26 m |
| 8. | Oleg Protsenko (URS) | 17.23 m |
| 9. | Norbert Elliott (BAH) | 16.79 m |
| 10. | Ivan Slanar (TCH) | 16.69 m |
| 11. | Dario Badinelli (ITA) | 16.63 m |
| 12. | Zdzisław Hoffmann (POL) | 16.58 m |
| — | Norifumi Yamashita (JPN) | NM |

== Qualifying round ==
- Held on Sunday 1987-08-30 with the mark set at 17.00 metres

| RANK | GROUP A | HEIGHT |
|---|---|---|
| 1. | Oleg Sakirkin (URS) | 17.35 m |
| 2. | Oleg Protsenko (URS) | 17.08 m |
| 3. | Mike Conley (USA) | 17.06 m |
| 4. | Zdzisław Hoffmann (POL) | 16.73 m |
| 5. | Dario Badinelli (ITA) | 16.64 m |
| 6. | Ivan Slanar (TCH) | 16.57 m |
| 7. | Norifumi Yamashita (JPN) | 16.57 m |
| 8. | Didier Falise (BEL) | 16.51 m |
| 9. | José Leitão (POR) | 16.17 m |
| 10. | Frank Rutherford (BAH) | 15.99 m |
| 11. | Francisco dos Santos (BRA) | 15.85 m |
| 12. | Arne Holm (SWE) | 15.76 m |
| 13. | José Salazar (VEN) | 15.76 m |
| 14. | Ajayi Agbebaku (NGR) | 15.66 m |
| 15. | Toussaint Rabenala (MAD) | 15.53 m |
| 16. | Paulo Noronha (MOZ) | 14.62 m |

| RANK | GROUP B | HEIGHT |
|---|---|---|
| 1. | Khristo Markov (BUL) | 17.20 m |
| 2. | Aleksandr Kovalenko (URS) | 17.16 m |
| 3. | Peter Bouschen (FRG) | 17.01 m |
| 4. | Jacek Pastusiński (POL) | 17.00 m |
| 5. | Norbert Elliott (BAH) | 16.65 m |
| 6. | Joseph Taiwo (NGR) | 16.63 m |
| 7. | Georgi Pomashki (BUL) | 16.49 m |
| 8. | Francis Dodoo (GHA) | 16.48 m |
| 9. | Serge Hélan (FRA) | 16.41 m |
| 10. | Charles Simpkins (USA) | 16.40 m |
| 11. | Willie Banks (USA) | 16.37 m |
| 12. | Đorđe Kožul (YUG) | 16.37 m |
| 13. | Edrick Floreal (CAN) | 16.33 m |
| 14. | Edward Cruden (SUR) | 15.32 m |
| 15. | Marios Hadjiandreou (CYP) | 14.78 m |
| — | Mohamed Zaki Sadri (MAS) | NM |

== See also ==
- 1982 Men's European Championships Triple Jump (Athens)
- 1983 Men's World Championships Triple Jump (Helsinki)
- 1984 Men's Olympic Triple Jump (Los Angeles)
- 1986 Men's European Championships Triple Jump (Stuttgart)
- 1988 Men's Olympic Triple Jump (Seoul)
- 1991 Men's World Championships Triple Jump (Tokyo)
