= Athletics at the 1988 Summer Olympics – Men's triple jump =

Men's triple jump at the Games of the XXIV Olympiad
- Pictogram for athletics
- Venue: Olympic Stadium
- Date: 23 September 1988 (qualifying); 24 September 1988 (final)
- Competitors: 43 from 31 nations
- Winning distance: 17.61 OR

Medalists
1st place, gold medalist(s)		Khristo Markov; Bulgaria
2nd place, silver medalist(s)		Igor Lapshin; Soviet Union
3rd place, bronze medalist(s)		Aleksandr Kovalenko; Soviet Union

The men's triple jump event at the 1988 Summer Olympics in Seoul, South Korea had an entry list of 45 competitors, with 43 athletes from 31 nations starting in two qualifying groups (43 jumpers) before the final (12) took place on Saturday September 24, 1988. The maximum number of athletes per nation had been set at 3 since the 1930 Olympic Congress. The event was won by Khristo Markov of Bulgaria, the nation's first medal and victory in the men's triple jump. Igor Lapshin and Aleksandr Kovalenko of the Soviet Union took silver and bronze in an event where the Soviets had reached the podium eight consecutive Games before the 1984 boycott.

== Background ==
This was the 21st appearance of the event, which is one of 12 athletics events to have been held at every Summer Olympics. The returning finalists from the 1984 Games were sixth-place finisher Willie Banks of the United States, ninth-place finisher Joseph Taiwo of Nigeria, and tenth-place finisher John Herbert of Great Britain. Banks had broken the world record in 1985, but "was no longer at his best in 1988." The favorite was Khristo Markov of Bulgaria, the 1987 World and 1986 European champion. The Soviet team, which had dominated the event before the 1984 boycott, also had three strong contenders.

Algeria, Angola, Belize, Bermuda, Cyprus, Ecuador, Kuwait, Libya, Mozambique, and Saint Vincent and the Grenadines each made their first appearance in the event; the Republic of China made its first appearance as Chinese Taipei. The United States competed for the 20th time, having missed only the boycotted 1980 Games.

== Competition format ==
The competition used the two-round format introduced in 1936. In the qualifying round, each jumper received three attempts to reach the qualifying distance of 16.90 metres; if fewer than 12 men did so, the top 12 (including all those tied) would advance. In the final round, each athlete had three jumps; the top eight received an additional three jumps, with the best of the six to count.

== Records ==
Prior to the competition, the existing world and Olympic records were as follows.

World record	Willie Banks (USA)	17.97	Indianapolis, United States	16 June 1985
Olympic record	Viktor Saneyev (URS)	17.39	Mexico City, Mexico	17 October 1968

Aleksandr Kovalenko broke the Olympic record with his first jump in the final round, at 17.42 metres. This lasted only until Khristo Markov's first jump (Kovalenko jumped sixth, Markov jumped tenth) of 17.61 metres, which held up as the gold medal winning jump and new Olympic record. Kovalenko's second jump (17.40 metres) and Igor Lapshin's sixth jump (17.52 metres) also surpassed the old Olympic record.

== Schedule ==
All times are Korea Standard Time adjusted for daylight savings (UTC+10)

Date	Time	Round
Friday, 23 September 1988	10:10	Qualifying
Saturday, 24 September 1988	12:30	Final

== Results ==
=== Qualifying ===
Rank	Athlete	Nation	1	2	3	Distance	Notes
1	Igor Lapshin	Soviet Union	17.37	—	—	17.37	Q
2	Aleksandr Kovalenko	Soviet Union	17.24	—	—	17.24	Q
3	Oleg Protsenko	Soviet Union	17.00	—	—	17.00	Q
4	Khristo Markov	Bulgaria	16.49	16.91	—	16.91	Q
5	Jacek Pastusiński	Poland	16.66	—	—	16.66	q
6	Ivan Slanar	Czechoslovakia	16.59	16.45	—	16.59	q
7	Willie Banks	United States	16.57	—	—	16.57	q
8	Norbert Elliott	Bahamas	16.43	16.33	X	16.43	q
9	Joseph Taiwo	Nigeria	16.42	16.24	16.34	16.42	q
10	Charles Simpkins	United States	16.00	16.27	16.35	16.35	q
11	Didier Falise	Belgium	16.19	X	16.35	16.35	q
12	Norifumi Yamashita	Japan	16.27	X	16.29	16.29	q
13	Vernon Samuels	Great Britain	15.85	16.28	16.07	16.28	
14	Chen Yanping	China	X	16.25	X	16.25	
15	Andrzej Grabarczyk	Poland	16.18	16.24	16.24	16.24	
16	John Herbert	Great Britain	16.01	16.17	16.18	16.18	
17	Francis Dodoo	Ghana	15.79	X	16.17	16.17	
18	Edrick Floreal	Canada	16.11	X	14.57	16.11	
19	George Wright	Canada	15.26	X	16.09	16.09	
20	Patterson Johnson	Bahamas	15.85	16.03	X	16.03	
21	Marios Hadjiandreou	Cyprus	15.89	15.95	X	15.95	
22	Jorge da Silva	Brazil	15.95	15.63	15.87	15.95	
23	Jonathan Edwards	Great Britain	13.66	15.66	15.88	15.88	
24	Park Young-Jun	South Korea	15.79	15.79	15.86	15.86	
25	José Quiñaliza	Ecuador	15.57	15.86	15.55	15.86	
26	Frank Rutherford	Bahamas	X	15.42	15.84	15.84	
27	Nai Hui-Fang	Chinese Taipei	15.74	15.42	15.49	15.74	
28	Abdul Marzouk Al-Yoha	Kuwait	15.62	15.72	15.60	15.72	
29	Robert Cannon	United States	14.33	15.69	X	15.69	
30	Lotfi Khaïda	Algeria	15.40	14.07	15.68	15.68	
31	José Leitão	Portugal	15.51	15.60	15.47	15.60	
32	Ricardo Valiente	Peru	X	15.54	15.59	15.59	
33	Ernesto Torres	Puerto Rico	15.44	15.35	15.59	15.59	
34	Brian Wellman	Bermuda	15.07	15.31	15.47	15.47	
35	Abcelvio Rodrigues	Brazil	15.13	14.77	14.74	15.13	
36	Fathi Aboud	Libya	15.13	—	—	15.13	
37	Haider Ali Shah	Pakistan	14.88	14.57	X	14.88	
38	Lennox Adams	Saint Vincent and the Grenadines	14.44	14.73	14.68	14.73	
39	Paulo Noronha	Mozambique	14.71	14.35	14.07	14.71	
40	Devon Hyde	Belize	13.59	—	14.09	14.09	
41	Toyi Simklina	Togo	X	13.92	X	13.92	
—	António dos Santos	Angola	X	—	—	No mark	
—	Milan Mikulas	Czechoslovakia	X	—	—	No mark	
—	James Browne	Antigua and Barbuda	DNS				
—	Béla Bakosi	Hungary	DNS				

=== Final ===
Rank	Athlete	Nation	1	2	3	4	5	6	Distance	Notes
1st place, gold medalist(s)	Khristo Markov	Bulgaria	17.61 OR	X	15.71	17.54	X	17.10	17.61	OR
2nd place, silver medalist(s)	Igor Lapshin	Soviet Union	16.75	17.09	X	X	X	17.52	17.52	
3rd place, bronze medalist(s)	Aleksandr Kovalenko	Soviet Union	17.42 OR	17.40	X	X	—	X	17.42	
4	Oleg Protsenko	Soviet Union	17.38	X	X	17.31	X	16.61	17.38	
5	Charles Simpkins	United States	16.62	X	X	—	X	17.29	17.29	
6	Willie Banks	United States	X	17.03	16.90	—	16.86	X	17.03	
7	Ivan Slanař	Czechoslovakia	16.58	16.75	16.59	X	X	16.24	16.75	
8	Jacek Pastusiński	Poland	16.72	X	X	X	16.50	16.56	16.72	
9	Joseph Taiwo	Nigeria	X	16.46	16.27	Did not advance			16.46	
10	Norbert Elliott	Bahamas	16.19	X	16.08	Did not advance			16.19	
11	Didier Falise	Belgium	16.06	X	16.17	Did not advance			16.17	
12	Norifumi Yamashita	Japan	15.62	X	X	Did not advance			15.62	

== See also ==
- 1984 Men's Olympic Triple Jump (Los Angeles)
- 1986 Men's European Championships Triple Jump (Stuttgart)
- 1987 Men's World Championships Triple Jump (Rome)
- 1990 Men's European Championships Triple Jump (Split)
- 1991 Men's World Championships Triple Jump (Tokyo)
- 1992 Men's Olympic Triple Jump (Barcelona)
