= 1987 IAAF World Indoor Championships – Men's triple jump =

The men's triple jump event at the 1987 IAAF World Indoor Championships was held at the Hoosier Dome in Indianapolis on 6 and 8 March.

== Medalists ==
Gold	Silver	Bronze
Mike Conley; United States	Oleg Protsenko; Soviet Union	Frank Rutherford; Bahamas

== Results ==
=== Qualification ===
Qualification: 16.70 m (Q) or at least 12 best performers (q).

Rank	Name	Nationality	#1	#2	#3	Result	Notes
1	Khristo Markov	Bulgaria	16.41	17.07		17.07	Q
2	Māris Bružiks	Soviet Union	16.35	16.93		16.93	Q
3	Oleg Protsenko	Soviet Union	16.64	16.46	16.75	16.75	Q
4	Mike Conley	United States	x	16.62		16.62	q
5	Ján Čado	Czechoslovakia	15.81	16.22	16.58	16.58	q
6	Joseph Taiwo	Nigeria	16.42	16.55	x	16.55	q
7	Norifumi Yamashita	Japan	x	16.24	16.47	16.47	q
8	Frank Rutherford	Barbados	15.97	16.40	x	16.40	q
9	Didier Falise	Belgium	16.27	x	16.39	16.39	q
10	Al Joyner	United States	x	16.17	16.36	16.36	q
11	Steve Hanna	Bahamas	15.61	15.98	16.25	16.25	q
12	Đorđe Kožul	Yugoslavia	15.44	16.06	16.13	16.13	q
13	Arne Holm	Sweden	15.69	x	16.07	16.07	
14	Peter Beames	Australia	x	16.05	x	16.05	
15	Marios Hadjiandreou	Cyprus	x	15.72		15.72	
16	Serge Hélan	France	14.90	15.26	15.69	15.69	
17	José Quiñaliza	Ecuador	14.65	13.73	14.77	14.77	NR
18	Edward Manderson	Cayman Islands	x	14.39	x	14.39	
19	Mauricio Carranza	El Salvador	13.74	x	13.59	13.74	NR
	Hassan Badra	Egypt	x	x	x	NM	
	Jesús Oliván	Spain				DNS	
	Ajayi Agbebaku	Nigeria				DNS	
	Paul Emordi	Nigeria				DNS	

=== Final ===
Rank	Name	Nationality	#1	#2	#3	#4	#5	#6	Result	Notes
1st place, gold medalist(s)	Mike Conley	United States	16.56	17.01	17.15	17.13	16.07	17.54	17.54	CR
2nd place, silver medalist(s)	Oleg Protsenko	Soviet Union	15.52	17.23	16.85	17.26	17.20	x	17.26	
3rd place, bronze medalist(s)	Frank Rutherford	Bahamas	14.78	16.31	17.02	x	x	x	17.02	
4	Khristo Markov	Bulgaria	16.87	16.96	16.87	16.70	16.68	–	16.96	
5	Al Joyner	United States	16.61	16.36	16.62	–	16.25	16.92	16.92	
6	Joseph Taiwo	Nigeria	16.48	16.63	16.65	16.41	16.48	16.50	16.65	
7	Māris Bružiks	Soviet Union	16.12	16.55	15.91	16.34	16.61	15.82	16.61	
8	Didier Falise	Belgium	16.40	16.53	16.26	16.27	16.20	16.27	16.53	
9	Norifumi Yamashita	Japan	15.49	16.22	16.43				16.43	
10	Ján Čado	Czechoslovakia	16.33	14.23	16.19				16.33	
11	Steve Hanna	Bahamas	15.61	16.09	x				16.09	
12	Đorđe Kožul	Yugoslavia	15.59	–	15.53				15.59	
