= 1986 European Athletics Championships – Men's triple jump =

Men's triple jump at the European Athletics Championships

These are the official results of the Men's Triple Jump event at the 1986 European Championships in Stuttgart, West Germany, held at Neckarstadion on 29 and 30 August 1986.

== Medalists ==
Gold	Khristo Markov; Bulgaria (BUL)
Silver	Māris Bružiks; Soviet Union (URS)
Bronze	Oleg Protsenko; Soviet Union (URS)

== Abbreviations ==
- All results shown are in metres

Q	automatic qualification
q	qualification by rank
DNS	did not start
NM	no mark
WR	world record
AR	area record
NR	national record
PB	personal best
SB	season best

== Records ==
Standing records prior to the 1986 European Athletics Championships
World Record	Willie Banks (USA)	17.97 m	June 16, 1985	Indianapolis, United States
Event Record	Keith Connor (GBR)	17.29 m	September 10, 1982	Athens, Greece
Broken records during the 1986 European Athletics Championships
Event Record	Māris Bružiks (URS)	17.33 m	August 30, 1986	Stuttgart, West Germany
Event Record	Khristo Markov (BUL)	17.66 m	August 30, 1986	Stuttgart, West Germany

== Results ==
=== Final ===
30 August

Rank	Name	Nationality	Attempts						Result	Notes
Rank	Name	Nationality	1	2	3	4	5	6	Result	Notes
1st place, gold medalist(s)	Khristo Markov	Bulgaria							17.66 (w: 1.9 m/s)	CR
2nd place, silver medalist(s)	Māris Bružiks	Soviet Union							17.33 (w: 1.1 m/s)	
3rd place, bronze medalist(s)	Oleg Protsenko	Soviet Union							17.28 w (w: 2.6 m/s)	
4	Georgi Pomashki	Bulgaria							16.99 (w: 0.3 m/s)	
5	Dirk Gamlin	East Germany							16.89 (w: -1.3 m/s)	
6	Nikolay Musiyenko	Soviet Union							16.86 (w: 0.4 m/s)	
7	Volker Mai	East Germany							16.74 (w: 0.0 m/s)	
8	Didier Falise	Belgium							16.74 (w: 1.1 m/s)	
9	Serge Hélan	France							16.64 (w: -0.3 m/s)	
10	Mike Makin	United Kingdom							16.63 (w: -1.3 m/s)	
11	Arne Holm	Sweden							16.37 (w: 0.8 m/s)	
12	Béla Bakosi	Hungary							16.09 (w: -1.4 m/s)	

=== Qualification ===
29 August

Rank	Name	Nationality	Result	Notes
1	Nikolay Musiyenko	Soviet Union	16.94 (w: 1.3 m/s)	Q
2	Volker Mai	East Germany	16.93 (w: -0.8 m/s)	Q
3	Oleg Protsenko	Soviet Union	16.93 (w: -1.4 m/s)	Q
4	Khristo Markov	Bulgaria	16.90 (w: -2.8 m/s)	Q
5	Béla Bakosi	Hungary	16.83 w (w: 3 m/s)	Q
6	Dirk Gamlin	East Germany	16.75 (w: -0.7 m/s)	Q
7	Serge Hélan	France	16.67 (w: -0.9 m/s)	Q
8	Didier Falise	Belgium	16.66 (w: -1.1 m/s)	Q
9	Mike Makin	United Kingdom	16.65 (w: 1.9 m/s)	Q
10	Māris Bružiks	Soviet Union	16.60 (w: -1.2 m/s)	Q
11	Arne Holm	Sweden	16.50 (w: -1.1 m/s)	Q
12	Georgi Pomashki	Bulgaria	16.45 (w: -0.5 m/s)	Q
13	Dario Badinelli	Italy	16.42 (w: 0.1 m/s)	
14	Ján Čado	Czechoslovakia	16.39 (w: -0.3 m/s)	
15	Ivan Slanař	Czechoslovakia	16.35 (w: -0.1 m/s)	
16	John Herbert	United Kingdom	16.32 (w: -3.2 m/s)	
17	Jacek Pastusiński	Poland	16.32 (w: -0.3 m/s)	
18	Peter Bouschen	West Germany	16.10 (w: 0 m/s)	
19	Milan Mikuláš	Czechoslovakia	16.10 (w: 0.4 m/s)	
20	Claes Rahm	Sweden	15.83 (w: -1.0 m/s)	
21	Thomas Eriksson	Sweden	15.79	
22	Marios Hadjiandreou	Cyprus	15.50 (w: -2.7 m/s)	
23	Wolfgang Zinser	West Germany	15.12 (w: -3.4 m/s)	

== Participation ==
According to an unofficial count, 23 athletes from 13 countries participated in the event.

- Belgium (1)
- Bulgaria (2)
- Cyprus (1)
- Czechoslovakia (3)
- East Germany (2)
- France (1)
- Hungary (1)
- Italy (1)
- Poland (1)
- Soviet Union (3)
- Sweden (3)
- United Kingdom (2)
- West Germany (2)

== See also ==
- 1983 Men's World Championships Triple Jump (Helsinki)
- 1984 Men's Olympic Triple Jump (Los Angeles)
- 1987 Men's World Championships Triple Jump (Rome)
- 1988 Men's Olympic Triple Jump (Seoul)
