= 1984 European Athletics Indoor Championships – Men's triple jump =

The men's triple jump event at the 1984 European Athletics Indoor Championships was held on 3 March.

== Results ==
Rank	Name	Nationality	#1	#2	#3	#4	#5	#6	Result	Notes
1st place, gold medalist(s)	Grigoriy Yemets	Soviet Union	17.04	x	17.33	x	x	x	17.33	AR, CR
2nd place, silver medalist(s)	Vlastimil Mařinec	Czechoslovakia	16.97	x	x	17.16	x	x	17.16	
3rd place, bronze medalist(s)	Béla Bakosi	Hungary	16.48	x	16.73	17.15	x	x	17.15	
4	Ján Čado	Czechoslovakia	16.41	16.66	16.66	16.72	x	16.93	16.93	
5	Khristo Markov	Bulgaria	16.39	16.89	15.10	x	15.86	x	16.89	
6	John Herbert	Great Britain	13.98	16.37	16.40	16.63	x	16.70	16.70	
7	Ralf Jaros	West Germany	16.48	15.72	15.42	x	13.95	x	16.48	
8	Dario Badinelli	Italy	15.83	16.43	16.23	16.00	16.33	x	16.43	
9	Waldemar Golanko	Poland	15.68	x	16.25				16.25	
10	Markku Rokala	Finland	x	16.18	16.11				16.18	
11	Cläs Rahm	Sweden	x	15.90	15.93				15.93	
12	Marios Hadjiandreou	Cyprus	15.83	15.82	15.82				15.83	
13	Birger Nielsen	Norway	x	15.59	x				15.59	
14	Arne Holm	Sweden	15.51	x	15.58				15.58	
