= Athletics at the Friendship Games – Men's triple jump =

The men's triple jump event at the Friendship Games was held on 18 August 1984 at the Grand Arena of the Central Lenin Stadium in Moscow, Soviet Union.

== Results ==
Rank	Name	Nationality	#1	#2	#3	#4	#5	#6	Result	Notes
1st place, gold medalist(s)	Oleg Protsenko	Soviet Union	16.48	16.39	17.46	x	x	17.19	17.46	
2nd place, silver medalist(s)	Aleksandr Yakovlev	Soviet Union	17.41w	x	17.09	14.41	16.67	x	17.41w	
3rd place, bronze medalist(s)	Khristo Markov	Bulgaria	x	16.39	16.98	16.96	x	17.29	17.29	
4	Lázaro Betancourt	Cuba							17.18	
5	Vlastimil Mařinec	Czechoslovakia							17.06	
6	Stoicha Iliev	Bulgaria							16.94	
7	Ján Čado	Czechoslovakia							16.93	
8	Grigoriy Yemets	Soviet Union							16.77	
9	Béla Bakosi	Hungary							16.61	
10	Jorge Reyna	Cuba							16.51	
11	Lázaro Balcindes	Cuba							16.48	
12	Zdzisław Hoffmann	Poland							16.42	
13	L.-A. Grady	Benin							14.52	

== See also ==
- Athletics at the 1984 Summer Olympics – Men's triple jump
