= 1991 IAAF World Indoor Championships – Men's triple jump =

The men's triple jump event at the 1991 IAAF World Indoor Championships was held on 9 and 10 March.

== Medalists ==
Gold	Silver	Bronze
Igor Lapshin; Soviet Union	Leonid Voloshin; Soviet Union	Tord Henriksson; Sweden

== Results ==
=== Qualification ===
Rank	Name	Nationality	Result	Notes
1	Igor Lapshin	Soviet Union	16.81	Q
2	Leonid Voloshin	Soviet Union	16.72	Q
3	Zou Sixin	China	16.68	Q
4	Tord Henriksson	Sweden	16.64	Q
5	Frank Rutherford	Bahamas	16.63	Q
6	Volker Mai	Germany	16.58	Q
7	Chen Yanping	China	16.51	Q
8	Anísio Silva	Brazil	16.50	Q
9	Andrzej Grabarczyk	Poland	16.46	Q
10	Milan Mikuláš	Czechoslovakia	16.37	Q
11	John Tillman	United States	16.32	Q
12	Dario Badinelli	Italy	16.25	Q
12	Nikolay Raev	Bulgaria	16.25	Q
14	Jörg Friess	Germany	16.16	
15	Marios Hadjiandreou	Cyprus	15.97	
16	Theodoros Tantanozis	Greece	15.85	
16	Ján Čado	Czechoslovakia	15.85	
18	Dorel Eftene	Romania	15.83	
19	António Santos	Angola	15.49	
20	Ricardo Valiente	Peru	14.71	NR
	Charles Simpkins	United States	NM	

=== Final ===
Rank	Name	Nationality	#1	#2	#3	#4	#5	#6	Result	Notes
1st place, gold medalist(s)	Igor Lapshin	Soviet Union	16.58	16.86	17.31	16.84	x	–	17.31	
2nd place, silver medalist(s)	Leonid Voloshin	Soviet Union	17.04	x	16.93	17.03	x	16.56	17.04	
3rd place, bronze medalist(s)	Tord Henriksson	Sweden	16.74	x	16.80	x	x	16.45	16.80	
4	Zou Sixin	China	16.66	x	16.78	16.66	16.58	x	16.78	PB
5	Volker Mai	Germany	16.64	16.74	16.60	16.55	16.56	16.65	16.74	
6	Chen Yanping	China	x	16.63	x	x	16.70	x	16.70	
7	Dario Badinelli	Italy	16.11	16.10	16.62	x	16.23	x	16.62	
8	Frank Rutherford	Bahamas	16.51	16.61	x	x	x	x	16.61	
9	John Tillman	United States	16.24	16.18	16.58				16.58	
10	Anísio Silva	Brazil	x	16.44	16.09				16.44	
11	Andrzej Grabarczyk	Poland	16.25	16.33	16.19				16.33	
12	Nikolay Raev	Bulgaria	15.72	16.14	16.19				16.19	
	Milan Mikuláš	Czechoslovakia	x	x	x				NM	
