= 1985 European Athletics Indoor Championships – Men's triple jump =

The men's triple jump event at the 1985 European Athletics Indoor Championships was held on 2 March.

== Results ==
Rank	Name	Nationality	#1	#2	#3	#4	#5	#6	Result	Notes
1st place, gold medalist(s)	Khristo Markov	Bulgaria	16.79	17.20	17.29	x	x	x	17.29	
2nd place, silver medalist(s)	Ján Čado	Czechoslovakia	16.69	x	x	x	16.98	17.23	17.23	NR
3rd place, bronze medalist(s)	Volker Mai	East Germany	16.53	16.56	17.14	x	–	16.72	17.14	AJR
4	Ralf Jaros	West Germany	16.59	x	16.67	x	x	16.78	16.78	
5	Gennadiy Valyukevich	Soviet Union	16.40	16.75	16.33	16.53	x	x	16.75	
6	Dario Badinelli	Italy	16.17	15.96	16.42	x	x	x	16.42	
7	Didier Falise	Belgium	x	16.21	16.34	15.50	15.90	x	16.34	
8	Pierre Camara	France	x	16.00	16.07	x	x	x	16.07	
9	Serge Hélan	France	x	x	15.98				15.98	
10	Marios Hadjiandreou	Cyprus	15.93	x	15.77				15.93	
11	Arne Holm	Sweden	15.78	x	14.89				15.78	
12	Tord Henriksson	Sweden	x	15.62	15.56				15.62	
13	José Leitão	Portugal	x	15.55	15.42				15.55	
14	Alfred Stummer	Austria	x	15.27	15.52				15.52	
	Juan Ambrosio González	Spain	x	r					NM	
