= 1988 European Athletics Indoor Championships – Men's triple jump =

The men's triple jump event at the 1988 European Athletics Indoor Championships was held on 6 March.

== Results ==
Rank	Name	Nationality	#1	#2	#3	#4	#5	#6	Result	Notes
1st place, gold medalist(s)	Oleg Sakirkin	Soviet Union	16.91	x	17.30	17.07	–	x	17.30	
2nd place, silver medalist(s)	Béla Bakosi	Hungary	x	x	16.82	17.25	x	x	17.25	NR
3rd place, bronze medalist(s)	Vasif Asadov	Soviet Union	x	17.02	x	17.23	x	16.86	17.23	
4	Khristo Markov	Bulgaria	x	17.05	x	x	17.19	x	17.19	
5	John Herbert	Great Britain	16.74	16.74	16.61	16.63	16.87	x	16.87	
6	Marios Hadjiandreou	Cyprus	16.24	16.37	16.74	x	x	x	16.74	
7	Ivan Slanař	Czechoslovakia	x	16.72	14.42	–	x	16.52	16.72	
8	Zdzisław Hoffmann	Poland	16.24	16.29	16.56	–	x	16.36	16.56	
9	Đorđe Kožul	Yugoslavia	16.48	16.55	16.41				16.55	
10	Dario Badinelli	Italy	16.01	16.25	16.54				16.54	
11	Lucian Sfiea	Romania	16.29	16.39	16.31				16.39	
12	Wolfgang Zinser	West Germany	16.24	x	15.77				16.24	
13	Serge Hélan	France	15.50	15.88	15.61				15.88	
14	Kersten Wolters	West Germany	15.85	15.64	x				15.85	
15	Arne Holm	Sweden	15.73	x	x				15.73	
	Gyula Pálóczi	Hungary	x	x	x				NM	
