= Athletics at the 1989 Summer Universiade – Men's triple jump =

The men's triple jump event at the 1989 Summer Universiade was held at the Wedaustadion in Duisburg on 27 and 29 August 1989.

== Medalists ==
| Gold | Silver | Bronze |
|---|---|---|
| Igor Lapshin; Soviet Union | Tord Henriksson; Sweden | Oleg Sakirkin; Soviet Union |

== Results ==
=== Qualification ===
Qualifying distance: 16.00 metres

| Rank | Group | Athlete | Nationality | Result | Notes |
|---|---|---|---|---|---|
| 1 | B | Rogel Nachum | Israel | 16.62 | Q |
| 2 | B | Igor Lapshin | Soviet Union | 16.48 | Q |
| 3 | A | Tord Henriksson | Sweden | 16.41 | Q |
| 4 | B | Lotfi Khaïda | Algeria | 16.38w | Q |
| 5 | B | Mauro Angelillo | Italy | 16.36w | Q |
| 6 | A | Oleg Sakirkin | Soviet Union | 16.28 | Q |
| 7 | A | Vernon Samuels | Great Britain | 16.23w | Q |
| 8 | B | Alfred Stummer | Austria | 16.20w | Q |
| 9 | A | Matt Sweeney | Australia | 16.15w | Q |
| 10 | A | Juan Miguel López | Cuba | 16.13 | Q |
| 10 | A | Daniele Buttiglione | Italy | 16.13 | Q |
| 10 | B | Krzysztof Zuch | Poland | 16.13 | Q |
| 13 | B | Volker Mai | East Germany | 16.09 | Q |
| 14 | A | Spyros Kourmousis | Greece | 16.08 | Q |
| 15 | B | William Beasley | United States | 16.01 | Q |
| 16 | B | Wolfgang Zinser | West Germany | 16.01 | Q |
| 17 | A | Edrick Floréal | Canada | 15.99 | |
| 18 | A | Li Hong | China | 15.97 | |
| 19 | A | Nikolay Avramov | Bulgaria | 15.95 | |
| 19 | B | Zoran Đurđević | Yugoslavia | 15.94 | |
| 21 | A | Heikki Herva | Finland | 15.91 | |
| 22 | A | Benjamin Koech | Kenya | 15.82w | |
| 23 | B | Jorge Alfredo Reina | Cuba | 15.69w | |
| 24 | B | Oral Ogilvie | Canada | 15.67w | |
| 25 | A | Joe Greene | United States | 15.33 | |
| 26 | A | Murat Ayaydın | Turkey | 15.25 | |
| 27 | ? | Cornel Benz | Switzerland | 15.22 | |

=== Final ===
| Rank | Athlete | Nationality | #1 | #2 | #3 | #4 | #5 | #6 | Result | Notes |
|---|---|---|---|---|---|---|---|---|---|---|
| 1st place, gold medalist(s) | Igor Lapshin | Soviet Union | 17.32 | 17.40 | x | 17.33 | 17.11 | x | 17.40 | |
| 2nd place, silver medalist(s) | Tord Henriksson | Sweden | | | | | | | 16.94 | |
| 3rd place, bronze medalist(s) | Oleg Sakirkin | Soviet Union | | | | | | | 16.93 | |
| 4 | Volker Mai | East Germany | | | | | | | 16.82 | |
| 5 | Juan Miguel López | Cuba | | | | | | | 16.78 | |
| 6 | William Beasley | United States | | | | | | | 16.70 | |
| 7 | Vernon Samuels | Great Britain | | | | | | | 16.68 | |
| 8 | Rogel Nachum | Israel | | | | | | | 16.47 | |
| 9 | Krzysztof Zuch | Poland | | | | | | | 16.39 | |
| 10 | Wolfgang Zinser | West Germany | | | | | | | 16.33 | |
| 11 | Daniele Buttiglione | Italy | | | | | | | 16.28 | |
| 12 | Alfred Stummer | Austria | | | | | | | 16.12 | |
| 13 | Spyros Kourmousis | Greece | | | | | | | 15.99w | |
| 14 | Lotfi Khaïda | Algeria | | | | | | | 15.97 | |
| 15 | Matt Sweeney | Australia | | | | | | | 15.67 | |
| 16 | Mauro Angelillo | Italy | | | | | | | 15.64 | |
