= 1983 World Championships in Athletics – Men's triple jump =

These are the official results of the men's triple jump event at the 1983 IAAF World Championships in Helsinki, Finland. There were a total of 27 participating athletes, with two qualifying groups and the final held on 8 August 1983.

== Medalists ==
Gold	Zdzisław Hoffmann; Poland (POL)
Silver	Willie Banks; United States (USA)
Bronze	Ajayi Agbebaku; Nigeria (NGR)

== Schedule ==
- All times are Eastern European Time (UTC+2)

Qualification Round
Group A	Group B
07.08.1983 – ??:??h	07.08.1983 – ??:??h
Final Round
08.08.1983 – ??:??h

== Records ==
Standing records prior to the 1983 World Athletics Championships
World Record	João Carlos de Oliveira (BRA)	17.89 m	October 15, 1975	Mexico City, Mexico
Event Record	New event			

== Final ==
RANK	FINAL	DISTANCE
	Zdzisław Hoffmann (POL)	17.42 m
	Willie Banks (USA)	17.18 m
	Ajayi Agbebaku (NGR)	17.18 m
4.	Mike Conley (USA)	17.13 m
5.	Vlastimil Mařinec (TCH)	17.13 m
6.	Ján Čado (TCH)	17.06 m
7.	Béla Bakosi (HUN)	16.83 m
8.	Al Joyner (USA)	16.76 m
9.	Peter Bouschen (FRG)	16.70 m
10.	Gennadiy Valyukevich (URS)	16.41 m
11.	Bedros Bedrosian (ROU)	16.18 m
12.	Steve Hanna (BAH)	14.96 m

== Qualifying round ==
- Held on Sunday 1983-08-07 with the mark set at 16.50 metres

RANK	GROUP A	DISTANCE
1.	Ajayi Agbebaku (NGR)	16.80 m
2.	Zdzisław Hoffmann (POL)	16.72 m
3.	Al Joyner (USA)	16.65 m
4.	Gennadiy Valyukevich (URS)	16.64 m
5.	Willie Banks (USA)	16.58 m
6.	Ján Čado (TCH)	16.50 m
7.	Bedros Bedrosian (ROU)	16.43 m
8.	Béla Bakosi (HUN)	16.41 m
9.	Zou Zhenxian (CHN)	16.17 m
10.	John Herbert (GBR)	16.12 m
11.	Esa Viitasalo (FIN)	16.03 m
11.	Wolfgang Knabe (FRG)	15.61 m
13.	Oswald Phillip (MSR)	13.96 m
14.	Laoui Adnan Abou (JOR)	13.53 m

RANK	GROUP B	DISTANCE
1.	Mike Conley (USA)	16.90 m
2.	Steve Hanna (BAH)	16.76 m
3.	Peter Bouschen (FRG)	16.71 m
4.	Vlastimil Mařinec (TCH)	16.57 m
5.	Vasiliy Grishchenkov (URS)	16.29 m
6.	Khristo Markov (BUL)	16.25 m
7.	Keith Connor (GBR)	16.18 m
8.	Claes Rahm (SWE)	16.07 m
9.	Dan Simion (ROU)	15.96 m
10.	Mamadou Diallo (SEN)	15.67 m
11.	José Quiñaliza (ECU)	15.18 m
—	Dimitrios Mihas (GRE)	NM
—	José Salazar (VEN)	DNS

== See also ==
- 1980 Men's Olympic Triple Jump (Moscow)
- 1982 Men's European Championships Triple Jump (Athens)
- 1984 Men's Olympic Triple Jump (Los Angeles)
- 1986 Men's European Championships Triple Jump (Stuttgart)
