= 1983 European Athletics Indoor Championships – Men's triple jump =

1983 athletic event

The men's triple jump event at the 1983 European Athletics Indoor Championships was held on March 5, 1983.

== Results ==
Rank	Name	Nationality	#1	#2	#3	#4	#5	#6	Result	Notes
1st place, gold medalist(s)	Nikolay Musiyenko	Soviet Union	17.11	x	16.88	x	16.84	17.12	17.12	
2nd place, silver medalist(s)	Gennadiy Valyukevich	Soviet Union	16.27	16.94	x	x	x	16.80	16.94	
3rd place, bronze medalist(s)	Béla Bakosi	Hungary	x	16.90	x	x	x	x	16.90	
4	Ján Čado	Czechoslovakia	16.60	16.44	x	x	x	16.17	16.60	
5	Jaak Uudmäe	Soviet Union	16.53	16.46	16.56	x	16.10	x	16.56	
6	Dario Badinelli	Italy	15.95	16.08	16.23	15.74	16.11	16.22	16.23	
7	Khristo Markov	Bulgaria	16.06	x	15.98	15.90	16.05	15.61	16.06	
8	Roberto Mazzucato	Italy	15.99	15.80	15.76	15.53	15.64	15.39	15.99	
9	Claes Rahm	Sweden	15.64	x	15.19				15.64	
