= Athletics at the 1987 Summer Universiade – Men's triple jump =

The men's triple jump event at the 1987 Summer Universiade was held at the Stadion Maksimir in Zagreb on 15 and 17 July 1987.

== Medalists ==
Gold	Silver	Bronze
Charles Simpkins; United States	Kenny Harrison; United States	Māris Bružiks; Soviet Union

== Results ==
=== Qualification ===
Rank	Group	Athlete	Nationality	Result	Notes
1	?	Kenny Harrison	United States	16.96	
2	?	Charles Simpkins	United States	16.68	
3	?	Norifumi Yamashita	Japan	16.50	
4	?	Māris Bružiks	Soviet Union	16.47	
5	?	Edrick Floréal	Canada	16.45	
6	?	Nenad Velimirović	Yugoslavia	16.42	
7	?	José Leitão	Portugal	16.34	
8	?	Francis Dodoo	Ghana	16.20	
9	?	Jonathan Edwards	Great Britain	16.18	
10	?	Đorđe Kožul	Yugoslavia	16.16	
11	?	Jörg Elbe	East Germany	16.12	
12	?	Paolo Challancin	Italy	16.03	
13	?	Marios Hadjiandreou	Cyprus	15.96	
14	?	Theodoros Tantanozis	Greece	15.94	
15	?	Chen Yanping	China	15.80	
16	?	Gianni Cecconi	Italy	15.77	
17	?	Fethi Khalifa Abou	Libya	15.71	
18	?	Armand Gbaguidi	Benin	15.28	
19	?	Billy Oakes	Ireland	15.08	
20	?	Ricardo Valiente	Peru	14.76	
21	?	Marvin Reid	Jamaica	13.80	
22	?	Viasi Narukutabua	Fiji	13.79	
22	?	Hassan Ghazala	Morocco	13.79	
24	?	Darshana Wijegunasinghe	Sri Lanka	13.51	
25	?	Jone Marayawa	Fiji	12.42	

=== Final ===
Rank	Athlete	Nationality	Result	Notes
1st place, gold medalist(s)	Charles Simpkins	United States	17.16	
2nd place, silver medalist(s)	Kenny Harrison	United States	17.07	
3rd place, bronze medalist(s)	Māris Bružiks	Soviet Union	16.90	
4	Đorđe Kožul	Yugoslavia	16.79	
5	Francis Dodoo	Ghana	16.78	
6	Norifumi Yamashita	Japan	16.52	
7	José Leitão	Portugal	16.49	
8	Edrick Floréal	Canada	16.37	
9	Jonathan Edwards	Great Britain	15.96	
10	Jörg Elbe	East Germany	15.93	
11	Paolo Challancin	Italy	15.81	
12	Nenad Velimirović	Yugoslavia	14.18	
