= Mykola Musiyenko =

Ukrainian former triple jumper (born 1959)

Personal information
- Born: 16 December 1959 (age 66) Dnipro, Soviet Union

Sport
- Sport: Track and field
Medal record
Representing Soviet Union
European Indoor Championships
Gold medal – first place	1983 Budapest	Triple jump
Gold medal – first place	1998 The Hague	Triple jump
Bronze medal – third place	1982 Milan	Triple jump
Bronze medal – third place	1987 Lievin	Triple jump

Mykola Musiyenko (Ukrainian: Микола Мусієнко, Russian: Николай Мусиенко – Nikolay Musiyenko; born 16 December 1959) is a Ukrainian former triple jumper who represented the Soviet Union and later Ukraine. He won four medals for the Soviet Union at the European Indoor Championships, being the champion in both 1983 and 1989. He competed at the 1989 IAAF World Indoor Championships, but failed to record a valid mark in the final. He was also a finalist at the 1986 European Athletics Championships. He was a bronze medallist at the 1986 Goodwill Games, held on home soil in Moscow.

He set his personal best mark of 17.78 m (58 ft 4 in) at the Brothers Znamensky Memorial in Leningrad in 1986. This mark is a former European record and made him the fourth best jumper ever at the time (after Willie Banks, João Carlos de Oliveira and Charles Simpkins). The European mark was beaten later that year by Bulgarian Khristo Markov and it remained the Soviet national record until 1990, when it was beaten by Vladimir Inozemtsev. As of January 2017, Musiyenko remains second on the Ukrainian lists after Inozemtsev and within the twenty best outdoor triple jumpers on the all-time lists.

He was twice national champion at the Soviet Indoor Athletics Championships, taking the title in 1982 and 1986 – both with meet record performances. At the Soviet Athletics Championships outdoors, his best finish was third, which he achieved at the 1981 and 1987 meets.

== International competitions ==
Year	Competition	Venue	Position	Notes
1982	European Indoor Championships	Athens, Greece	3rd	16.82 m
1983	European Indoor Championships	Budapest, Hungary	1st	17.12 m
1986	European Championships	Stuttgart, West Germany	6th	16.86 m
1986	Goodwill Games	Moscow, Soviet Union	3rd	17.33 m
1987	European Indoor Championships	Liévin, France	3rd	17.00 m
1989	European Indoor Championships	The Hague, Netherlands	1st	17.29 m
1989	World Indoor Championships	Budapest, Hungary	NM	16.40 m (q)

== See also ==
- List of European Athletics Indoor Championships medalists (men)
