= 1985 IAAF World Indoor Games – Men's triple jump =

The men's triple jump event at the 1985 IAAF World Indoor Games was held at the Palais Omnisports Paris-Bercy on 18 January 1985.

== Results ==
| Rank | Name | Nationality | #1 | #2 | #3 | #4 | #5 | #6 | Result | Notes |
|---|---|---|---|---|---|---|---|---|---|---|
| 1st place, gold medalist(s) | Khristo Markov | Bulgaria | x | 16.93 | 17.13 | 16.86 | 17.22 | x | 17.22 | NR |
| 2nd place, silver medalist(s) | Lázaro Betancourt | Cuba | 16.25 | 15.91 | 17.02 | x | 16.89 | 17.15 | 17.15 | |
| 3rd place, bronze medalist(s) | Lázaro Balcindes | Cuba | 16.83 | 16.74 | 16.17 | x | x | – | 16.83 | PB |
| 4 | Oleg Protsenko | Soviet Union | x | 16.55 | 16.80 | x | x | 15.85 | 16.80 | |
| 5 | Ján Čado | Czechoslovakia | x | 16.55 | x | 16.45 | 16.71 | 16.68 | 16.71 | |
| 6 | Ralf Jaros | West Germany | x | 15.97 | 16.44 | 16.61 | 16.30 | 16.48 | 16.61 | |
| 7 | Zou Zhenxian | China | x | 15.86 | x | 16.05 | 15.63 | 15.54 | 16.05 | |
| 8 | Ahmed Hassan Badra | Egypt | 15.36 | 15.77 | x | x | x | 15.38 | 15.77 | NR |
| 9 | Yasushi Ueta | Japan | x | 15.75 | x | | | | 15.75 | |
| 10 | Didier Falise | Belgium | 15.56 | 15.42 | 15.35 | | | | 15.56 | |
| 11 | Torstein Dahle | Norway | x | 15.30 | 15.35 | | | | 15.35 | |
| | Mihai Bran | Romania | x | x | x | | | | NM | |
