= 1986 European Athletics Indoor Championships – Men's triple jump =

The men's triple jump event at the 1986 European Athletics Indoor Championships was held on 23 February.

== Results ==
| Rank | Name | Nationality | #1 | #2 | #3 | #4 | #5 | #6 | Result | Notes |
|---|---|---|---|---|---|---|---|---|---|---|
| 1st place, gold medalist(s) | Maris Bruzhiks | Soviet Union | x | 17.26 | 17.09 | 17.54 | 16.41 | x | 17.54 | =CR, NR |
| 2nd place, silver medalist(s) | Vladimir Plekhanov | Soviet Union | 16.82 | 17.10 | x | 16.73 | x | 17.21 | 17.21 | |
| 3rd place, bronze medalist(s) | Béla Bakosi | Hungary | 16.41 | 16.93 | x | x | x | x | 16.93 | |
| 4 | Ján Čado | Czechoslovakia | 16.38 | 16.90 | 16.72 | x | x | x | 16.90 | |
| 5 | Arne Holm | Sweden | 16.58 | x | x | 16.87 | 16.41 | 16.75 | 16.87 | |
| 6 | Georgi Pomashki | Bulgaria | 16.08 | 16.61 | 16.60 | x | 16.75 | x | 16.75 | |
| 7 | Dario Badinelli | Italy | 16.21 | 16.37 | 15.81 | x | 16.38 | 16.67 | 16.67 | |
| 8 | Marios Hadjiandreou | Cyprus | 16.36 | 16.25 | 15.84 | 15.87 | 16.43 | x | 16.43 | |
| 9 | Jordi Vila | Spain | 15.95 | x | 16.34 | | | | 16.34 | |
| 10 | Pierre Camara | France | 15.27 | 16.03 | 16.28 | | | | 16.28 | |
| 11 | Milan Mikuláš | Czechoslovakia | 16.06 | x | 16.16 | | | | 16.16 | |
| 12 | Claes Rahm | Sweden | x | 16.06 | 15.69 | | | | 16.06 | |
| 13 | Wolfgang Knabe | West Germany | 15.91 | 16.03 | x | | | | 16.03 | |
| 14 | Alfred Stummer | Austria | 15.60 | x | 15.99 | | | | 15.99 | |
| | Khristo Markov | Bulgaria | x | x | x | | | | NM | |
| | Mihai Ene | Romania | | | | | | | DNS | |
