= 1990 European Athletics Indoor Championships – Men's triple jump =

The men's triple jump event at the 1990 European Athletics Indoor Championships was held in Kelvin Hall on 4 March.

== Results ==
Rank	Name	Nationality	#1	#2	#3	#4	#5	#6	Result	Notes
1st place, gold medalist(s)	Igor Lapshin	Soviet Union	17.14	16.88	16.78	17.08	16.90	x	17.14	
2nd place, silver medalist(s)	Oleg Sakirkin	Soviet Union	16.42	x	x	16.42	16.70	16.56	16.70	
3rd place, bronze medalist(s)	Tord Henriksson	Sweden							16.69	
4	Vernon Samuels	Great Britain							16.57	
5	Jörg Frieß	East Germany							16.52	
6	Andrzej Grabarczyk	Poland							16.52	
7	Dario Badinelli	Italy							16.27	
8	John Herbert	Great Britain							16.18	
9	Kersten Wolters	West Germany							16.15	
10	Marios Hadjiandreou	Cyprus							15.83	
11	Spyros Kourmousis	Greece							15.80	
