= 1989 European Athletics Indoor Championships – Men's triple jump =

The men's triple jump event at the 1989 European Athletics Indoor Championships was held on 18 February.

== Results ==
Rank	Name	Nationality	Result	Notes
1st place, gold medalist(s)	Nikolay Musiyenko	Soviet Union	17.29	
2nd place, silver medalist(s)	Volker Mai	East Germany	17.03	
3rd place, bronze medalist(s)	Milan Mikuláš	Czechoslovakia	16.93	
4	Serge Hélan	France	16.83	
5	Dario Badinelli	Italy	16.62	
6	Andrzej Grabarczyk	Poland	16.60	
7	Pierre Camara	France	16.52	
8	Ivan Slanař	Czechoslovakia	16.48	
9	Alfred Stummer	Austria	16.41	
10	Santiago Moreno	Spain	16.31	
11	Kersten Wolters	West Germany	16.29	
12	Didier Falise	Belgium	15.77	
13	Elias Agapiou	Cyprus	15.47	
