= 1989 IAAF World Indoor Championships – Men's triple jump =

The men's triple jump event at the 1989 IAAF World Indoor Championships was held at the Budapest Sportcsarnok in Budapest on 3 and 4 March.

== Medallists ==
Gold	Silver	Bronze
Mike Conley; United States	Jorge Reyna; Cuba	Juan Miguel López; Cuba

== Results ==
=== Qualification ===
Qualification: 16.60 (Q) or at least 12 best performers (q) qualified for the final.

Rank	Name	Nationality	Result	Notes
1	Volodymyr Inozemtsev	Soviet Union	16.96	Q
2	Milan Mikuláš	Czechoslovakia	16.89	Q
3	Mike Conley, Sr.	United States	16.88	Q
4	Juan Miguel López	Cuba	16.76	Q
5	Jorge Reyna	Cuba	16.71	Q
6	Serge Hélan	France	16.59	q
7	John Herbert	Great Britain	16.57	q
8	Toussaint Rabenala	Madagascar	16.49	q, NR
9	Alfred Stummer	Austria	16.46	q, NR
10	Nikolay Musiyenko	Soviet Union	16.43	q
11	Charles Simpkins	United States	16.43	q
12	Andrzej Grabarczyk	Poland	16.40	q
13	Pierre Camara	France	16.27	
14	Patterson Johnson	Bahamas	16.19	
15	Béla Bakosi	Hungary	16.05	
16	Wendell Lawrence	Bahamas	15.94	

=== Final ===
Rank	Name	Nationality	#1	#2	#3	#4	#5	#6	Result	Notes
1st place, gold medalist(s)	Mike Conley Sr.	United States	16.83	17.20	17.22	17.49	17.65	17.51	17.65	CR
2nd place, silver medalist(s)	Jorge Reyna	Cuba	16.96	17.02	17.41	17.19	16.76	x	17.41	NR
3rd place, bronze medalist(s)	Juan Miguel López	Cuba	17.12	x	17.10	17.28	16.57	x	17.28	PB
4	Volodymyr Inozemtsev	Soviet Union							17.17	
5	Milan Mikuláš	Czechoslovakia							16.84	
6	Serge Hélan	France							16.62	
7	Andrzej Grabarczyk	Poland							16.56	
8	John Herbert	Great Britain							16.55	
9	Charles Simpkins	United States							16.26	
10	Toussaint Rabenala	Madagascar							16.06	
11	Alfred Stummer	Austria							15.93	
	Nikolay Musiyenko	Soviet Union							NM	
