= Athletics at the 1984 Summer Olympics – Men's triple jump =

Men's triple jump at the Games of the XXIII Olympiad
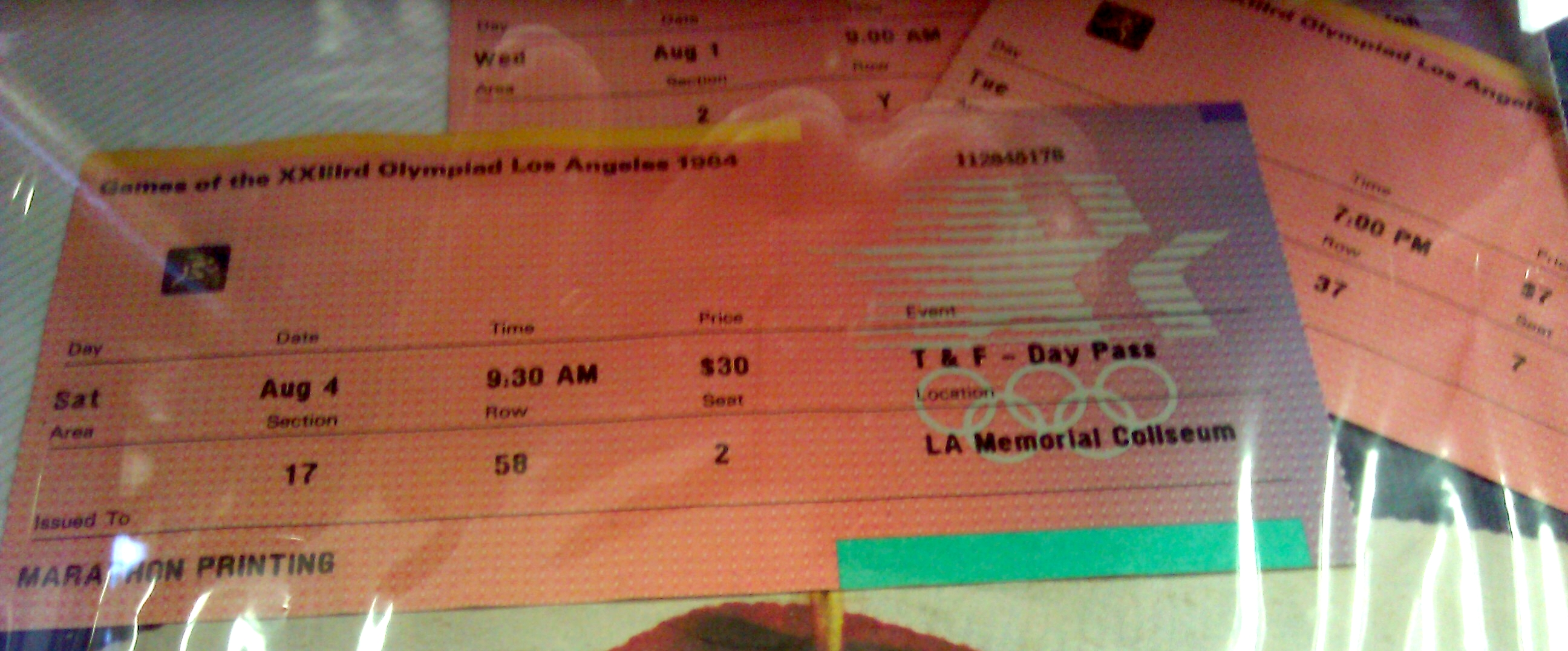
- Athletics tickets
- Venue: Los Angeles Memorial Coliseum
- Dates: 3–4 August
- Competitors: 28 from 21 nations
- Winning distance: 17.26

Medalists
1st place, gold medalist(s)		Al Joyner; United States
2nd place, silver medalist(s)		Mike Conley Sr. United States
3rd place, bronze medalist(s)		Keith Connor; Great Britain

The men's triple jump event at the 1984 Summer Olympics in Los Angeles, California had an entry list of 28 competitors, with two qualifying groups (28 jumpers) before the final (12) took place on August 4, 1984. The maximum number of athletes per nation had been set at 3 since the 1930 Olympic Congress. The top twelve and ties, and all those reaching 16.60 metres advanced to the final. The event was won by Al Joyner of the United States, the nation's first title in the men's long jump since 1904 and fourth overall. Mike Conley Sr., also an American, took silver. Keith Connor's bronze was Great Britain's first medal in the event since 1908. The Soviet boycott broke that nation's four-Games gold medal and eight-Games podium streaks.

== Background ==
This was the 20th appearance of the event, which is one of 12 athletics events to have been held at every Summer Olympics. The only returning finalists from the 1980 Games were fourth-place finisher Keith Connor of Great Britain and eighth-place finisher Ken Lorraway of Australia; the Soviet jumpers were not present due to the boycott while the two men who felt they had been wronged by Soviet judging in 1980, João Carlos de Oliveira and Ian Campbell, had both suffered career-ending injuries shortly after the Moscow Games. The inaugural world champion, Zdzisław Hoffmann of Poland, was also absent due to the boycott. Mike Conley Sr. of the United States was the favorite.

Cameroon, the People's Republic of China, Mali, Paraguay, and Togo each made their first appearance in the event. The United States competed for the 19th time, having missed only the boycotted 1980 Games.

== Competition format ==
The competition used the two-round format introduced in 1936. In the qualifying round, each jumper received three attempts to reach the qualifying distance of 16.60 metres; if fewer than 12 men did so, the top 12 (including all those tied) would advance. In the final round, each athlete had three jumps; the top eight received an additional three jumps, with the best of the six to count.

== Records ==
Prior to the competition, the existing world and Olympic records were as follows.

World record	João Carlos de Oliveira (BRA)	17.89	Mexico City, Mexico	15 October 1975
Olympic record	Viktor Saneyev (URS)	17.39	Mexico City, Mexico	17 October 1968

No new world and Olympic records were set during this competition.

== Schedule ==
All times are Pacific Daylight Time (UTC-7)

Date	Time	Round
Friday, 3 August 1984	10:00	Qualifying
Saturday, 4 August 1984	18:00	Final

== Results ==
=== Qualifying ===
Rank	Group	Athlete	Nation	1	2	3	Distance	Notes
1	A	Mike Conley, Sr.	United States	17.36	—	—	17.36	Q
2	A	Eric McCalla	Great Britain	17.01	—	—	17.01	Q
3	B	Ajayi Agbebaku	Nigeria	16.93	—	—	16.93	Q
4	A	Al Joyner	United States	16.30	16.45	16.85	16.85	Q
5	B	Zou Zhenxian	China	16.27	16.68	—	16.68	Q
6	B	John Herbert	Great Britain	16.64	—	—	16.64	Q
7	B	Joseph Taiwo	Nigeria	16.38	16.61	—	16.61	Q
8	B	Keith Connor	Great Britain	16.60	—	—	16.60	Q
9	B	Willie Banks	United States	X	16.12	16.59	16.59	q
10	B	Hassan Badra	Egypt	15.72	16.48	X	16.48	q
11	A	Peter Bouschen	West Germany	X	15.64	16.40	16.40	q
12	A	Mamadou Diallo	Senegal	X	15.91	16.18	16.18	q
13	B	Dimitrios Mikhas	Greece	16.01	16.15	X	16.15	
14	A	Steve Hanna	Bahamas	16.02	16.14	15.00	16.14	
15	A	Dario Badinelli	Italy	16.13	16.11	15.98	16.13	
16	B	Abcélvio Rodrigues	Brazil	16.12	15.86	15.14	16.12	
17	B	Ralf Jaros	West Germany	X	X	16.02	16.02	
18	A	Thomas Eriksson	Sweden	15.97	X	14.99	15.97	
19	A	Ken Lorraway	Australia	15.26	15.92	X	15.92	
20	A	Moses Kiyai	Kenya	15.83	15.90	X	15.90	
21	A	Paul Emordi	Nigeria	15.57	X	15.88	15.88	
22	A	Yasushi Ueta	Japan	15.64	X	15.66	15.66	
23	B	Francis Dodoo	Ghana	15.55	15.29	14.99	15.55	
24	B	Park Yeong-jun	South Korea	15.54	X	X	15.54	
25	A	Abdoulaye Traoré	Mali	15.32	14.95	14.98	15.32	
26	B	Denou Koffi	Togo	14.44	X	X	14.44	
27	B	Ernest Tché-Noubossie	Cameroon	14.36	14.39	X	14.39	
28	A	Oscar Diesel	Paraguay	13.88	14.12	14.19	14.19	
—	B	Angel Gagliano	Argentina	DNS				

=== Final ===
McCalla and Taiwo were tied for eighth at 16.64 metres after three jumps, so both received the additional three jumps.

Rank	Athlete	Nation	1	2	3	4	5	6	Distance
1st place, gold medalist(s)	Al Joyner	United States	17.26	17.04	16.83	—	16.94	17.04	17.26
2nd place, silver medalist(s)	Mike Conley	United States	16.91	X	17.18	X	X	X	17.18
3rd place, bronze medalist(s)	Keith Connor	Great Britain	16.72	16.87	X	16.63	16.67	16.81	16.87
4	Zou Zhenxian	China	16.83	16.71	16.16	X	16.33	16.40	16.83
5	Peter Bouschen	West Germany	16.04	16.77	16.38	16.58	16.28	16.75	16.77
6	Willie Banks	United States	16.23	16.75	X	X	16.33	16.51	16.75
7	Ajayi Agbebaku	Nigeria	14.84	16.67	—	—	—	—	16.67
8	Eric McCalla	Great Britain	16.64	X	15.89	—	X	16.66	16.66
9	Joseph Taiwo	Nigeria	16.36	16.64	16.61	16.12	16.57	16.32	16.64
10	John Herbert	Great Britain	16.35	16.05	16.40	Did not advance			16.40
11	Hassan Badra	Egypt	15.52	15.74	16.07	Did not advance			16.07
12	Mamadou Diallo	Senegal	15.99	15.69	—	Did not advance			15.99

== See also ==
- 1982 Men's European Championships Triple Jump (Athens)
- 1983 Men's World Championships Triple Jump (Helsinki)
- 1984 Men's Friendship Games Triple Jump (Moscow)
- 1986 Men's European Championships Triple Jump (Stuttgart)
- 1987 Men's World Championships Triple Jump (Rome)
