= Slanař =

Slanař, Slanar is a surname. Notable people with the surname include:

- Ivan Slanař (born 1961), Czechoslovak triple jumper
- Martin Slanar (born 1981), Austrian tennis player
