= Yemets =

Yemets is a surname. Notable people with the surname include:

- Dmitri Yemets (born 1974), Russian author
- Grigoriy Yemets (born 1957), Ukrainian athlete
- Illia Yemets (born 1956), Ukrainian physician and politician
- Vladyslav Yemets (born 1997), Ukrainian football player
- Volodymyr Yemets (1937–1987), Soviet Ukrainian football player and manager
