= Georgi Pomashki =

Bulgarian-Greek triple jumper

Georgi Pomashki (Bulgarian: Георги Помашки; Greek: Γιώργος Πομάσκι) (born 10 January 1960) is a Bulgarian-born Greek athletics coach and jump trainer, who is best known for his long-term work with elite Greek jump athletes, particularly in the horizontal jumps. He is also himself a retired triple jumper who has had a short career in Bulgaria.

He finished sixth at the 1986 European Indoor Championships, fourth at the 1986 European Championships, eighth at the 1987 European Indoor Championships, and competed at the 1987 World Championships without reaching the final.

He became Bulgarian champion in 1983, before Khristo Markov took five titles in a row, and also became Bulgarian indoor champion in 1985 and 1988. His personal best jump was 17.03 metres, achieved in August 1988 in Budapest; and also 7.95 metres in the long jump, achieved in July 1988 in Pleven.

After his retirement he became a trainer in Greece. He trained many successful athletes such as Voula Patoulidou, Voula Tsiamita, Olga Vasdeki, Voula Papachristou, Tori Franklin and Miltos Tentoglou. He also took part at the 2019 European Parliament election in Greece with the KKE
