= Athletics at the 1986 Commonwealth Games – Men's triple jump =

Men's triple jump at the Commonwealth Games

The men's triple jump event at the 1986 Commonwealth Games was held on 2 August at the Meadowbank Stadium in Edinburgh.

== Results ==
Rank	Name	Nationality	#1	#2	#3	#4	#5	#6	Result	Notes
1st place, gold medalist(s)	John Herbert	England	16.72	17.27w	16.68	16.74	x	17.00	17.27w	
2nd place, silver medalist(s)	Mike Makin	England	x	15.88	x	16.43	16.87		16.87	
3rd place, bronze medalist(s)	Peter Beames	Australia	15.72	16.28	16.40				16.42	
4	Gary Honey	Australia							16.16	
5	Aston Moore	England							16.07	
6	George Wright	Canada							15.86	
7	Craig Duncan	Scotland	15.68	x	15.13				15.68	
8	Edrick Floréal	Canada							15.58	
9	David Wood	Wales							15.28	
