= 1987 European Athletics Indoor Championships – Men's triple jump =

The men's triple jump event at the 1987 European Athletics Indoor Championships was held on 22 February.

== Results ==
Rank	Name	Nationality	#1	#2	#3	#4	#5	#6	Result	Notes
1st place, gold medalist(s)	Serge Hélan	France	16.60	17.15	–	16.97	–	16.92	17.15	NR
2nd place, silver medalist(s)	Khristo Markov	Bulgaria	16.79	x	17.12	x	15.63	17.07	17.12	
3rd place, bronze medalist(s)	Nikolay Musiyenko	Soviet Union	16.92	17.00	16.75	16.38	x	16.88	17.00	
4	Ján Čado	Czechoslovakia	16.48	16.66	16.89	16.96	x	x	16.96	
5	Vladimir Plekhanov	Soviet Union	x	16.82	16.72	16.89	x	16.88	16.89	
6	Arne Holm	Sweden	16.35	x	16.76	16.71	x	x	16.76	
7	Didier Falise	Belgium	x	16.24	16.09	16.29	16.22	16.33	16.33	
8	Georgi Pomashki	Bulgaria	16.28	x	16.15	x	x	x	16.28	
9	Đorđe Kožul	Yugoslavia	x	16.09	16.13				16.13	
10	Alain René-Corail	France	16.12	x	16.10				16.12	
