= Fidelis Obikwu =

English decathlete

Personal information
- Nationality: British (English)
- Born: 12 June 1960 (age 66) Surrey, England

Sport
- Sport: Athletics
- Event: decathlon
- Club: Haringey AC
Medal record
Athletics
Representing England
Commonwealth Games
| Bronze medal – third place | 1982 Brisbane | decathlon |

Fidelis C. Obikwu (born 12 June 1960), is a male former athlete who competed for England.

== Biography ==
Obikwu was studying at and competing for North Carolina University in 1982 and became the British decathlon champion after winning the British AAA Championships title at the 1982 AAA Championships in Birmingham. Shortly afterwards he represented England and won a bronze medal in the decathlon, at the 1982 Commonwealth Games in Brisbane, Australia.

He won the Atlantic Coast Conference decathlon titles in 1982 and 1984 and finished second behind Greg Richards in the decathlon event at the 1986 AAA Championships in Wrexham.
