= Steve Crabb (athlete) =

British runner (born 1963)

Personal information
- Nationality: British (English)
- Born: 30 November 1963 (age 62) Edmonton, London, England
- Height: 188 cm (6 ft 2 in)
- Weight: 70 kg (154 lb)

Sport
- Sport: Track
- Event: 1500 metres
- Club: Enfield Harriers

Achievements and titles
- Personal bests: 800 metres: 1:45.69 1500 metres: 3:33.34; Mile: 3:51.76 3000 metres: 7:52.98

Stephen Paul Crabb (born 30 November 1963) is a former middle-distance runner from England. He competed at the 1988 Olympic Games in Seoul and the 1992 Olympic Games in Barcelona.

== Biography ==
Crabb born in Edmonton, London, England, was a member of the Enfield Harriers.

Crabb finished second behind John Gladwin in the 1500 metres event at the 1986 AAA Championships. He became the British 1500 metres champion after winning the British AAA Championships title at the 1987 AAA Championships.

He was selected to run in the 1987 World Championships 1500 metres with Steve Cram and Adrian Passey. The following year Crabb qualified to run in the 1988 Olympic 1500 metres with Peter Elliott and Steve Cram ahead of then Olympic champion Sebastian Coe.

Crabb returned to the Olympic Games to run in the 1992 Olympic 1500 metres. Also representing Great Britain were Kevin McKay and Matthew Yates.

== International competitions ==
| Year | Competition | Venue | Position | Event | Notes |
Representing Great Britain
| 1987 | World Championships | Rome, Italy | 19th (sf) | 1500 m | 3:42.12 (3:38.11 heat) |
| 1988 | Olympic Games | Seoul, South Korea | 15th (sf) | 1500 m | 3:39.55 (3:42.12 heat) |
| 1992 | Olympic Games | Barcelona, Spain | 22nd (h) | 1500 m | 3:41.00 |
(#) Indicates overall position in qualifying heats (h) or semifinal round (sf)

== Personal Bests ==
| Distance | Time | Date | Place |
|---|---|---|---|
| 800 metres | 1:45.69 | 17 August 1988 | Zurich |
| 1000 metres | 2:17.75 | 5 August 1987 | Oslo |
| 1500 metres | 3:33.34 | 4 July 1987 | Oslo |
| Mile run | 3:51.76 | 14 August 1987 | London |
| 3000 metres | 7:52.98 | 18 May 1991 | Paris |
