= Abdoulaye Traoré (athlete) =

Malian athlete (born 1959)

Personal information
- Nationality: Malian
- Born: 29 March 1959 (age 67)

Sport
- Sport: Athletics
- Events: Long jump Triple jump

Abdoulaye Traoré (born 29 March 1959) is a Malian athlete. He competed in the men's long jump and the men's triple jump at the 1984 Summer Olympics.
