= Milan Mikuláš =

Czech triple jumper

Milan Mikuláš (born 1 April 1963 in Trnava) is a retired triple jumper who represented Czechoslovakia during his active career. His personal best jump is 17.53 metres, achieved in July 1988 in Prague. This is the current Czech record. His personal best in long jump is 8.25 metres.

He won the bronze medal at the 1989 European Indoor Championships in Athletics and finished fifth at the 1989 IAAF World Indoor Championships. He also competed at the 1991 IAAF World Indoor Championships and the 1993 World Championships without reaching the final.

== International competitions ==
| Year | Competition | Venue | Position | Event | Notes |
Representing Czechoslovakia
| 1986 | European Indoor Championships | Madrid, Spain | 11th | Triple jump | 16.16 m |
| 1986 | European Championships | Stuttgart, West Germany | 19th (q) | Triple jump | 16.10 m |
| 1988 | Olympic Games | Seoul, South Korea | – | Triple jump | NM |
| 1989 | European Indoor Championships | The Hague, Netherlands | 3rd | Triple jump | 16.93 m |
| 1989 | World Indoor Championships | Budapest, Hungary | 5th | Triple jump | 16.84 m |
| 1991 | World Indoor Championships | Sevilla, Spain | 10th (q) | Triple jump | 16.37 m^{1} |
| 1992 | Olympic Games | Barcelona, Spain | 15th | Triple jump | 16.82 m |
Representing the Czech Republic
| 1993 | European Championships | Stuttgart, Germany | 25th (q) | Triple jump | 16.59 m |
| 1994 | European Championships | Helsinki, Finland | 10th | Triple jump | 16.29 m |

^{1}No mark in the final
