= Peter Beames =

Australian athlete (born 1963)

Personal information
- Nationality: Australian
- Born: 13 September 1963 (age 62)

Sport
- Sport: Athletics
- Event: Triple jump
Medal record
Commonwealth Games
Bronze medal – third place	1986 Edinburgh	Triple jump

Peter Beames (born 13 September 1963) is an Australian former athlete.

An accountant by profession, Beames was Australia's national champion in the triple jump from 1985 to 1988. He was also a New Zealand national title holder. His best legal jump of 16.58m was set in Brisbane in 1988.

Beames was a triple jump bronze medalist at the 1986 Commonwealth Games in Edinburgh, finishing behind English jumpers John Herbert and Mike Makin. Other performances included sixth place at the 1985 Pacific Conference Games, eighth at the 1985 IAAF World Cup and 14th at the 1987 IAAF World Indoor Championships.

Beames finished second behind Nigerian Joseph Taiwo at the British 1986 AAA Championships.
