= Lennox Adams =

Vincentian athlete

Personal information
- Born: 6 January 1968 (age 57)

Sport
- Country: Saint Vincent and the Grenadines
- Sport: Athletics

Lennox Adams (born 6 January 1968) is a Vincentian athlete, who competed at the 1988 Summer Olympics.

== Career ==
Adams was part of the first ever Saint Vincent and the Grenadines team to compete at the Summer Olympics in 1988 when they went to Seoul, South Korea, he entered the triple jump, his furthest jump was 14.73 metres and he finished 19th in his group, 38th overall and didn't advance to the final.
