= Andrzej Grabarczyk (athlete) =

Polish triple jumper (1964–2016)

Personal information
- Born: 12 January 1964 Poddębice, Poland
- Died: 17 July 2016 (aged 52) Łódź, Poland
- Height: 1.88 m (6 ft 2 in)
- Weight: 73 kg (161 lb)

Sport
- Sport: Athletics
- Event: Triple jump
- Club: Włókniarz Aleksandrów; Start Łódź; Gryf Słupsk; Zdrowie – MOSiR Piła
- Coached by: Leszek Lipiński; Andrzej Lasocki

Andrzej Grabarczyk (12 January 1964 – 17 July 2016) was a Polish triple jumper. He represented his country at two Olympic Games, in 1988 and 1992, without qualifying for the final. In addition, he reached the final of one outdoor and two indoor World Championships.

His personal bests in the event were 17.00 metres outdoors (0.0 m/s, Kielce 1991) and 16.60 metres indoors (The Hague 1989).

== International competitions ==
Year	Competition	Venue	Position	Event	Notes
Representing Poland
1988	Olympic Games	Seoul, South Korea	15th (q)	Triple jump	16.24 m
1989	European Indoor Championships	The Hague, Netherlands	6th	Triple jump	16.60 m
1989	World Indoor Championships	Budapest, Hungary	7th	Triple jump	16.56 m
1990	European Indoor Championships	Glasgow, Scotland	6th	Triple jump	16.52 m
1990	European Championships	Split, Yugoslavia	6th	Triple jump	16.82 m (+1.5 m/s)
1991	World Indoor Championships	Seville, Spain	11th	Triple jump	16.33 m
1991	World Championships	Tokyo, Japan	12th	Triple jump	16.23 m
1992	Olympic Games	Barcelona, Spain	34th (q)	Triple jump	15.79 m
