= Toussaint Rabenala =

Malagasy triple jumper (born 1965)

Medal record

Men's athletics

Representing Madagascar

African Championships
| Gold medal – first place | 1990 Cairo | Triple jump |
| Gold medal – first place | 1992 Belle Vue Harel | Triple jump |
| Gold medal – first place | 1993 Durban | Triple jump |
| Silver medal – second place | 1989 Lagos | Triple jump |

Toussaint Rabenala (born 29 October 1965) is a retired Malagasy triple jumper.

== International competition ==
| Year | Competition | Venue | Position | Event | Notes |
Representing Madagascar
| 1986 | Goodwill Games | Moscow, Soviet Union | – | Long jump | NM |
| 1986 | Goodwill Games | Moscow, Soviet Union | 12th | Triple jump | 14.75 m |
| 1987 | All-Africa Games | Nairobi, Kenya | 3rd | Triple jump | 16.35 m |
| 1987 | World Championships | Rome, Italy | 28th (q) | Triple jump | 15.53 m |
| 1989 | World Indoor Championships | Indianapolis, United States | 10th | Triple jump | 16.06 m |
| 1989 | Jeux de la Francophonie | Casablanca, Morocco | 1st | Triple jump | 16.97 m |
| 1989 | African Championships | Lagos, Nigeria | 2nd | Triple jump | 16.80 m |
| 1990 | African Championships | Cairo, Egypt | 1st | Triple jump | 16.61 m |
| 1991 | World Championships | Tokyo, Japan | 30th (q) | Triple jump | 15.82 m |
| 1992 | African Championships | Belle Vue Maurel, Mauritius | 1st | Triple jump | 17.04 m |
| 1992 | Olympic Games | Barcelona, Spain | 14th (q) | Triple jump | 16.84 m |
| 1992 | World Cup | Havana, Cuba | 3rd | Triple jump | 17.03 m^{1} |
| 1993 | World Indoor Championships | Toronto, Canada | 7th | Triple jump | 16.74 m |
| 1993 | African Championships | Durban, South Africa | 1st | Triple jump | 16.72 m |
| 1993 | World Championships | Stuttgart, Germany | 21st (q) | Triple jump | 16.81 m |
| 1994 | Jeux de la Francophonie | Bondoufle, France | 8th | Long jump | 7.37 m |
| 1997 | Jeux de la Francophonie | Antananarivo, Madagascar | 1st | Triple jump | 16.50 m |
| 1999 | All-Africa Games | Johannesburg, South Africa | 3rd | Triple jump | 16.60 m |

^{1}Representing Africa

=== Personal bests ===
- Long jump - 7.77 metres (1990) - national record.
- Triple jump - 17.05 metres (1989) - national record.
