= Arne Holm (athlete) =

Swedish triple jumper

Personal information
- Born: 22 December 1961

Sport
- Sport: Athletics
- Event: Triple jump

Arne Holm (born 22 December 1961) is a retired Swedish athlete who specialised in the triple jump. He represented his country at two outdoor and two indoor World Championships.

His personal bests in the event are 17.05 metres outdoors (Gothenburg 1987) and 16.97 metres indoors (Borlänge 1996).

== International competitions ==
Year	Competition	Venue	Position	Notes
Representing Sweden
1984	European Indoor Championships	Gothenburg, Sweden	14th	15.58 m
1985	European Indoor Championships	Piraeus, Greece	11th	15.78 m
1986	European Indoor Championships	Madrid, Spain	5th	16.87 m
1986	European Championships	Stuttgart, West Germany	11th	16.37 m
1987	European Indoor Championships	Liévin, France	6th	16.76 m
1987	World Indoor Championships	Indianapolis, United States	13th (q)	16.07 m
1987	World Championships	Rome, Italy	24th (q)	15.76 m
1988	European Indoor Championships	Budapest, Hungary	15th	15.73 m
1994	European Championships	Helsinki, Finland	15th (q)	16.21 m
1995	World Indoor Championships	Barcelona, Spain	5th	16.81 m
1995	World Championships	Gothenburg, Sweden	25th (q)	15.94 m
1996	European Indoor Championships	Stockholm, Sweden	5th	16.60 m
