= 1986 AAA Championships =

Outdoor track and field competition

- Dates: 20–21 June 1986
- Host city: Birmingham, England
- Venue: Alexander Stadium
- Level: Senior
- Type: Outdoor

The 1986 AAA Championships sponsored by (Kodak) was the 1986 edition of the annual outdoor track and field competition organised by the Amateur Athletic Association (AAA). It was held from 20 to 21 June 1986 at the Alexander Stadium in Birmingham, England.

== Summary ==
The Championships covered two days of competition.

The 1986 London Marathon determined the marathon champion and the decathlon was held in Wrexham from 20 to 21 June 1986. The 3,000 metres walk was held for the last time.

A new javelin weight and design was introduced with the purpose of reducing the distances thrown by athletes for safety reasons and reducing the instances of the javelin landing flat.

== Results ==
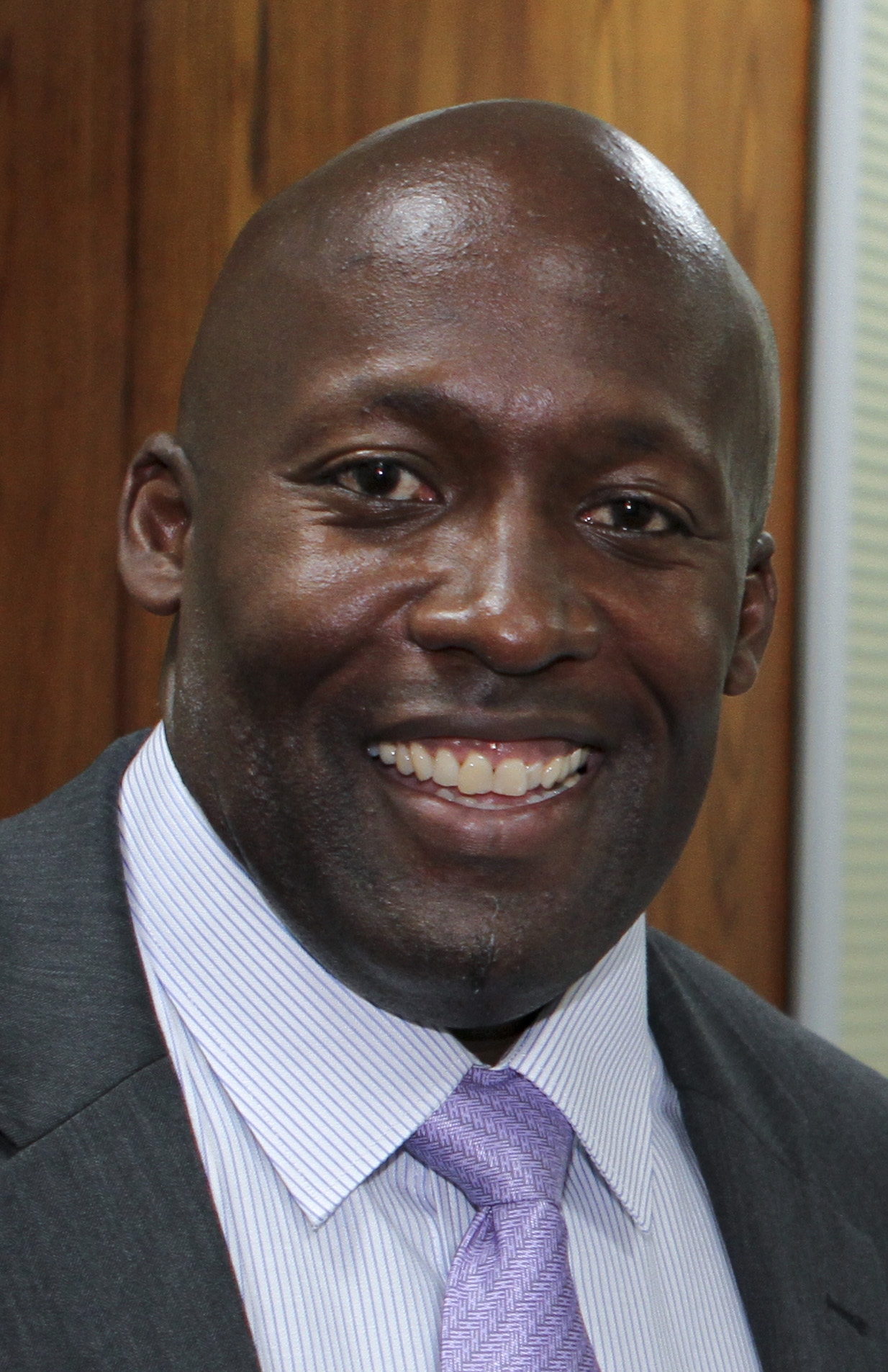
John Regis won the first of his six titles

Event	Gold		Silver		Bronze	
100m	Linford Christie	10.22	Mike McFarlane	10.26	Daley Thompson	10.34
200m	John Regis	20.41	Todd Bennett	20.50	Linford Christie	20.51
400m	(Australia) Darren Clark	44.94	Roger Black	45.16	Kriss Akabusi	46.08
800m	Steve Cram	1:46.15	Peter Elliott	1:46.67	David Sharpe	1:46.81
1,500m	John Gladwin	3:35.93	Steve Crabb	3:38.04	Paul Larkins	3:38.19
5,000m	Tim Hutchings	13:25.03	Jack Buckner	13:26.08	(Czechoslovakia) Petr Klimeš	13:31.54
10,000m	Jon Solly	27:51.76	Steve Binns	27:58.61	Mike McLeod	28:02.83
marathon	Hugh Jones	2:11:42	(Scotland) Allister Hutton	2:12:36	(Wales) Ieuan Ellis	2:14:38
3000m steeplechase	Eddie Wedderburn	8:33.03	Nick Peach	8:33.89	John Hartigan	8:38.67
110m hurdles	(Wales) Colin Jackson	13.51	(Wales) Nigel Walker	13.75	David Nelson	13.91
400m hurdles	Max Robertson	49.52	(France) Philippe Gonigam	50.21	Mark Holtom	50.33
3,000m walk	(New Zealand) Murray Day	12:04.0	Chris Smith	12:23.0	Les Morton	12:45.2
10,000m walk	Ian McCombie	41:42.28	(New Zealand) Murray Day	42:46.92	Paul Blagg	42:58.20
high jump	(Scotland) Geoff Parsons	2.23	(Northern Ireland) Floyd Manderson	2.20	Fayyaz Ahmed	2.15
pole vault	Brian Hooper	5.30	Jeff Gutteridge	5.20	Keith Stock	5.20
long jump	Derrick Brown	8.07	John King	7.94	John Shepherd	7.89
triple jump	(Nigeria) Joseph Taiwo	16.99	(Australia) Peter Beames	16.90	Mike Makin	16.67
shot put	Billy Cole	19.01	Mike Winch	18.10	Graham Savory	17.28
discus throw	Richard Slaney	59.62	Graham Savory	58.52	Paul Mardle	57.42
hammer throw	David Smith	68.72	Matt Mileham	68.70	Mick Jones	68.50
javelin throw	David Ottley	80.24	(Iceland) Einar Vilhjálmsson	77.84	Darryl Brand	74.54
decathlon	Greg Richards	7336	Fidelis Obikwu	6936	Robert Laing	6794

== See also ==
- 1986 WAAA Championships
