= Serge Hélan =

French triple and long jumper

Medal record

Men's athletics

Representing France

European Championships
Silver medal – second place	1994 Helsinki	Triple jump

Serge Hélan (born 24 February 1964 in Pointe-à-Pitre, Guadeloupe) is a retired French triple jumper, best known for his bronze medal at the 1995 World Indoor Championships. His personal best was 17.55 metres, achieved at the 1994 European Championships in Helsinki. This was a French record as well. He also competed in the long jump from time to time, his personal best was 8.12 metres.

== International competitions ==
Year	Competition	Venue	Position	Event	Notes
Representing France
1985	World Indoor Games	Paris, France	6th	Long jump	7.71 m
1985	European Indoor Championships	Piraeus, Greece	9th	Triple jump	15.98 m
1986	European Championships	Stuttgart, West Germany	9th	Triple jump	16.64 m
1987	European Indoor Championships	Liévin, France	1st	Triple jump	17.15 m
1987	World Indoor Championships	Indianapolis, United States	16th (q)	Triple jump	15.69 m
1987	World Championships	Rome, Italy	18th (q)	Triple jump	16.14 m
1988	European Indoor Championships	Budapest, Hungary	13th	Triple jump	15.88 m
1989	European Indoor Championships	The Hague, Netherlands	4th	Triple jump	16.83 m
1989	World Indoor Championships	Budapest, Hungary	6th	Triple jump	16.62 m
1989	Jeux de la Francophonie	Casablanca, Morocco	4th	Triple jump	16.49 m
1990	European Championships	Split, Yugoslavia	–	Triple jump	NM
1991	World Championships	Tokyo, Japan	21st (q)	Triple jump	16.51 m
1992	European Indoor Championships	Genoa, Italy	–	Long jump	NM
1992	European Indoor Championships	Genoa, Italy	2nd	Triple jump	17.18 m
1992	Olympic Games	Barcelona, Spain	31st (q)	Long jump	7.60 m
1992	Olympic Games	Barcelona, Spain	20th (q)	Triple jump	16.47 m
1993	World Indoor Championships	Toronto, Canada	15th (q)	Triple jump	16.25 m
1993	Mediterranean Games	Narbonne, France	3rd	Long jump	7.89 m (w)
1993	World Championships	Stuttgart, Germany	9th	Triple jump	17.09 m
1994	European Indoor Championships	Paris, France	18th (q)	Long jump	7.72 m
1994	European Indoor Championships	Paris, France	4th	Triple jump	17.23 m
1994	European Championships	Helsinki, Finland	2nd	Triple jump	17.55 m
1995	World Indoor Championships	Barcelona, Spain	3rd	Triple jump	17.06 m
1997	World Indoor Championships	Paris, France	16th (q)	Triple jump	16.58 m
1997	World Championships	Athens, Greece	10th	Triple jump	16.97 m
1998	European Indoor Championships	Valencia, Spain	3rd	Triple jump	17.02 m
