= Tord Henriksson =

Swedish triple jumper

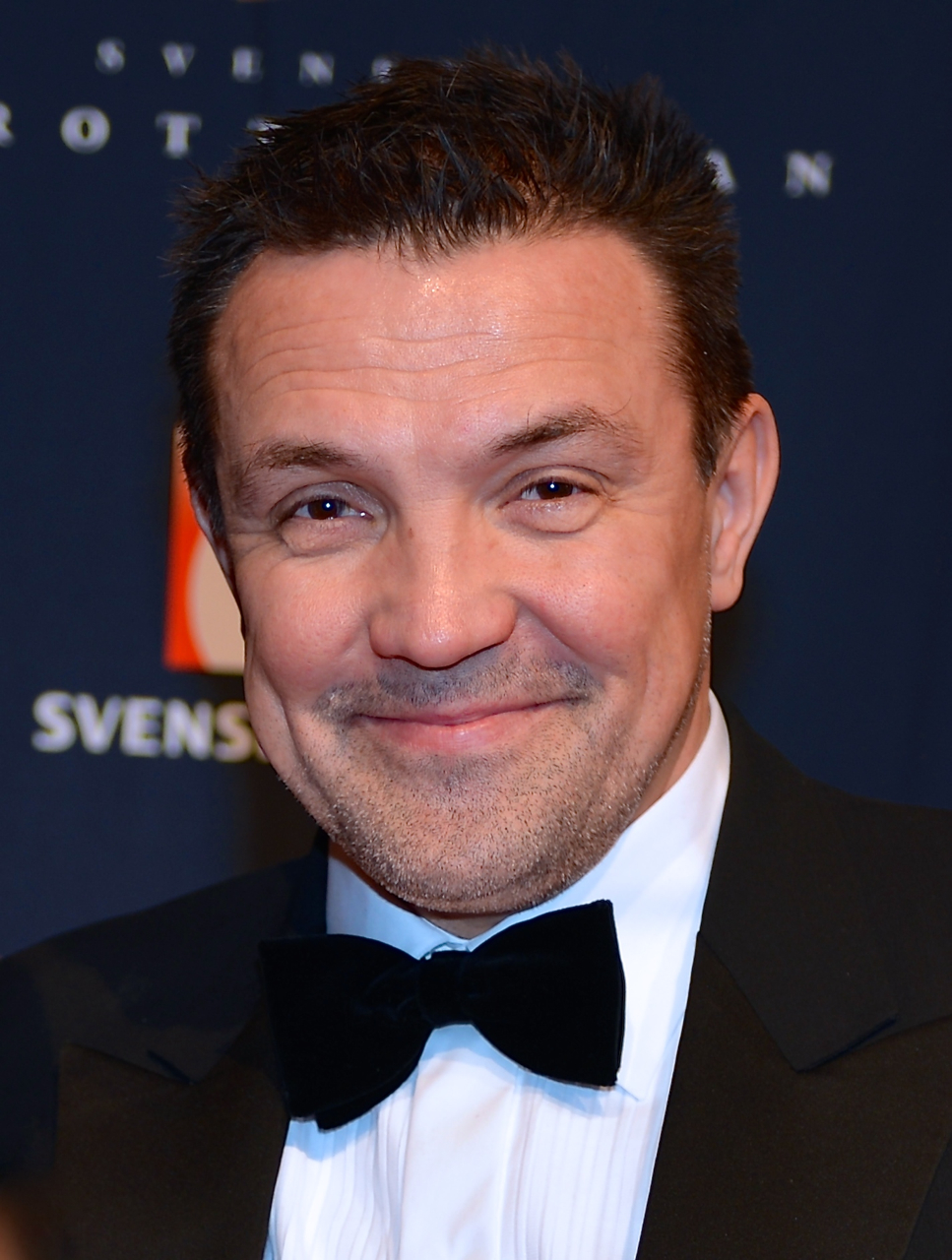
- Tord Henriksson in 2014

Personal information
- Born: 13 April 1965 (age 61) Karlstad, Sweden

Sport
- Sport: Track and field
Medal record
Representing Sweden
World Indoor Championships
Bronze medal – third place	1991 Seville	Triple jump
European Indoor Championships
Bronze medal – third place	1990 Glasgow	Triple jump
Summer Universiade
Silver medal – second place	1989 Duisburg	Triple jump

Tord Erik Stefan Henriksson (born 13 April 1965) is a retired Swedish triple jumper, best known for his bronze medal at the 1991 World Indoor Championships. His personal best was 17.21 metres, achieved in July 1993 in Bad Cannstatt. He is married to middle-distance runner Maria Akraka.

== International competitions ==
Representing Sweden
Year	Competition	Venue	Position	Event	Notes
1985	European Indoor Championships	Piraeus, Greece	12th	Triple jump	15.62 m
1989	Universiade	Duisburg, West Germany	2nd	Triple jump	16.94 m
1990	European Indoor Championships	Glasgow, United Kingdom	3rd	Triple jump	16.69 m
1990	European Championships	Split, Yugoslavia	17th	Triple jump	16.00 m
1991	World Indoor Championships	Seville, Spain	3rd	Triple jump	16.80 m
1991	World Championships	Tokyo, Japan	5th	Triple jump	17.12 m
1992	Olympic Games	Barcelona, Spain	37th	Triple jump	15.66 m
1995	World Championships	Gothenburg, Sweden	9th	Triple jump	16.92 m
