= Kersten Wolters =

German triple jumper

Kersten Wolters (born 20 July 1965) is a retired German triple jumper.

He finished fourteenth at the 1988 European Indoor Championships, eleventh at the 1989 European Indoor Championships, and ninth at the 1990 European Indoor Championships.

At the West German and German championships he won silver medals in 1989 and 1990 and a bronze medal in 1992. He represented the club LG Hammer Park Hamburg. Indoors he won silver medals in 1987, 1989 and 1990 and the bronze medal in 1988.

His personal best jump was 16.70 metres, achieved in July 1990 in Essen. He also had 7.32 metres in the long jump, achieved in August 1983 in Schwechat.
