= Jörg Friess =

East German triple jumper

Jörg Friess (born 27 October 1968) is a retired East German triple jumper, who finished fourth at the 1990 European Championships with a career best jump of 17.01 metres.

This result places him tenth on the German all-time performers list, behind Ralf Jaros, Charles Friedek, Volker Mai, Dirk Gamlin, Peter Bouschen, Wolfgang Zinser, Jörg Drehmel, Jörg Elbe and Wolfgang Knabe. Friess had a better indoor result with 17.31 metres, achieved in February 1991 in Mannheim.

Friess became East German champion in 1987 and 1990 for the team SC Dynamo Berlin, and won a national silver medal in reunified Germany in 1991 for OSC Berlin.

== Achievements ==
Year	Competition	Venue	Position	Event	Notes
Representing East Germany
1990	European Championships	Split, Yugoslavia	4th	Triple jump	17.01 m
