= Volodymyr Inozemtsev =

Ukrainian triple jumper (1964–2020)

Volodymyr Volodymyrovych Inozemtsev (Ukrainian: Володимир Володимирович Іноземцев; 25 May 1964 – 4 February 2020) was a triple jumper from Ukraine.

== Career ==
He set the current Ukrainian record in the event (17.9 m) on 20 June 1990 at a meet in Bratislava.

He finished fourth at the 1989 World Indoor Championships (17.17 m), second at the 1989 IAAF World Cup (17.31 m), and third at the Athletics at the 1990 Goodwill Games – Results#1990 Goodwill Games (17.06 m). He also competed at the 1993 World Championships (16.84 m) without reaching the final.

He became Soviet champion in 1989 and 1990, Soviet indoor champion in 1989 and Ukrainian champion in 1993.
