= Grigoriy Yemets =

Ukrainian former track and field athlete (born 1957)

Grigoriy Yemets (Russian: Григорий Емец; born 8 October 1957) is a Ukrainian former track and field athlete who competed in the triple jump for the Soviet Union.

His greatest achievement came at the 1984 European Athletics Indoor Championships, where he won the gold medal in the final with a European indoor record jump of 17.33 m (56 ft 10 1/4 in). This was the best indoor performance that year. It stood as the championship for only two years, as fellow Soviet Māris Bružiks cleared 17.54 m (57 ft 6 1/2 in) to win the title in 1986.

Later in 1984 he set an outdoor career best of 17.30 m (56 ft 9 in) in Donetsk. He was chosen to represent the Soviet Union at the Friendship Games, but managed only eighth place. In the 1983 season, his highest global ranking was ninth and, after 1985 he dropped out of the global top 25.

== International competitions ==
Year	Competition	Venue	Position	Event	Notes
1984	European Indoor Championships	Gothenburg, Sweden	1st	Triple jump	17.33 m AR
1984	Friendship Games	Moscow, Soviet Union	8th	Triple jump	16.77 m

== See also ==
- List of European Athletics Indoor Championships medalists (men)
