= Didier Falise =

Belgian triple jumper

Didied Falise (born 3 March 1961) is a retired Belgian triple jumper.

He was born in Oreye. He finished tenth at the 1985 World Indoor Games, eighth at the 1986 European Championships, seventh at the 1987 European Indoor Championships, eighth at the 1987 World Indoor Championships, eleventh at the 1988 Olympic Games and twelfth at the 1989 European Indoor Championships, He also competed at the 1987 World Championships and the 1990 European Championships without reaching the final.

He became Belgian champion every year from 1980 through 1990, except for 1983. His personal best jump was 16.86 metres, achieved in August 1986 in Brussels.
