= Zdzisław Hoffmann =

Polish triple jumper

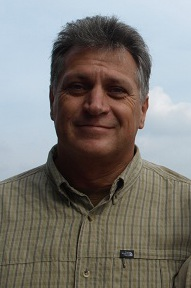
- Zdzisław Hoffmann in 2010

Medal record

Men's athletics

World Championships
Gold medal – first place	1983 Helsinki	Triple jump

Zdzisław Hoffmann (born 27 August 1959) is a retired triple jumper from Poland. He is best known for winning the gold medal at the inaugural 1983 World Championships, for which he was named Polish Sportspersonality of the Year at the end of the year.

== Career ==
He was born in Świebodzin. He finished twelfth at the 1980 European Indoor Championships and competed at the 1980 Olympic Games without reaching the final. In 1983 he won the triple jump event at the inaugural 1983 World Championships. For this he was named the Polish Sportspersonality of the Year at the end of the year.

He finished twelfth at the 1987 World Championships and eighth at the 1988 European Indoor Championships. He became Polish champion in 1981, 1983, 1984 and 1989, and Polish indoor champion in 1980, 1983, 1984, 1987 and 1988.

His personal best jump 17.53 metres, achieved in June 1985 in Madrid. His personal best long jump was 8.09 metres, achieved in May 1983 in Warsaw.

His son, Karol Hoffmann, is also a triple jump athlete.

== Competition record ==
Year	Competition	Venue	Position	Notes
Representing Poland
1980	European Indoor Championships	Sindelfingen, West Germany	12th	16.03 m
1980	Olympic Games	Moscow, Soviet Union	16th (q)	15.35 m
1983	World Championships	Helsinki, Finland	1st	17.42 m
1984	Friendship Games	Moscow, Soviet Union	12th	16.42 m
1987	World Championships	Rome, Italy	12th	16.58 m
1988	European Indoor Championships	Budapest, Hungary	8th	16.56 m
