= John Gladwin (athlete) =

English former middle-distance runner and athletics administrator

Personal information
- Nationality: British (English)
- Born: 7 May 1963 (age 63) Wimbledon, England

Sport
- Sport: Athletics
- Event: 800m/1500m
- Club: Belgrave Harriers
Medal record
Athletics
Representing England
Commonwealth Games
Silver medal – second place	1986 Edinburgh	1500m

John Gladwin (born 7 May 1963) is an English former middle-distance runner and athletics administrator.

== Athletics career ==
Gladwin won a silver medal representing England in the 1500 metres at the 1986 Commonwealth Games in Edinburgh, Scotland. He also won the 800 metres (1987) and 1500 metres (1983) titles at the UK Championships and the 1500 metres at the 1986 AAA Championships.

His track mile time of 3:51.02 is the 9th fastest of all time by a British athlete.

In 2019 Gladwin was elected president of Belgrave Harriers, the club he competed for as an athlete. He still holds Belgrave club records in the 800m, 1,000m, 1500m and the mile.

== International competitions ==
Year	Competition	Venue	Position	Event	Notes
Representing England
1986	Commonwealth Games	Edinburgh, United Kingdom	2nd	1500m	3:52.17
Representing Great Britain
1986	European Championships	Stuttgart, Germany	5th	1500m	3:42.57
