= Patterson Johnson =

Bahamian triple jumper

Personal information
- Nationality: Bahamian
- Born: 26 August 1964 (age 61)

Sport
- Sport: Athletics
- Event: Triple jump

Patterson Johnson (born 26 August 1964) is a Bahamian athlete. He competed in the men's triple jump at the 1988 Summer Olympics.

Johnson was an All-American triple jumper for both the Arkansas State Red Wolves track and field and Murray State Racers track and field teams.
