= Yasushi Ueta =

Japanese triple jumper

Personal information
- Nationality: Japanese
- Born: 13 November 1955 (age 70)

Sport
- Sport: Athletics
- Event: Triple jump
Medal record
Men's athletics
Representing Japan
Asian Championships
Silver medal – second place	1983 Kuwait City	Triple jump
Bronze medal – third place	1981 Tokyo	Triple jump
Bronze medal – third place	1985 Jakarta	Triple jump

Yasushi Ueta (植田 恭史, Ueta Yasushi; born 13 November 1955) is a Japanese track and field athlete. He competed in the men's triple jump at the 1984 Summer Olympics. He is currently a professor of sports science at Tokai University.
