= Mike Makin =

English athlete

Personal information
- Nationality: British (English)
- Born: 1 March 1962 (age 64) Warrington, Cheshire, England

Sport
- Sport: Athletics
- Event: Triple jump
- Club: Leeds City
Medal record
Athletics
Representing England
Commonwealth Games
Silver medal – second place	1986 Edinburgh	triple jump

Michael Robert Makin (born 1 March 1962) is a male former athlete who competed for England.

== Biography ==
Makin represented England in the triple jump event, and won a silver medal at the 1986 Commonwealth Games in Edinburgh, Scotland.

Makin became the British triple jump champion after finishing third behind Joseph Taiwo and Peter Beames at the 1986 AAA Championships by virtue of being the highest placed British athlete.
