= Mike Conley (triple jumper) =

American track and field athlete (born 1962)

Personal information
- Full name: Michael Alexander Conley Sr.
- Nationality: American
- Born: October 5, 1962 (age 64) Chicago, Illinois, U.S.
- Height: 6 ft 1 in (185 cm)
- Weight: 170 lb (77 kg)

Sport
- Sport: Track and field
- Event: Triple jump
- College team: Arkansas Razorbacks
Medal record
Men's athletics
Representing the United States
Olympic Games
Gold medal – first place	1992 Barcelona	Triple jump
Silver medal – second place	1984 Los Angeles	Triple jump
World Championships
Gold medal – first place	1993 Stuttgart	Triple jump
Silver medal – second place	1987 Rome	Triple jump
Bronze medal – third place	1983 Helsinki	Long jump
Bronze medal – third place	1991 Tokyo	Triple jump
Pan American Games
Gold medal – first place	1987 Indianapolis	Triple jump
World Indoor Championships
Gold medal – first place	1987 Indianapolis	Triple jump
Gold medal – first place	1989 Budapest	Triple jump
Bronze medal – third place	1989 Budapest	Long jump
Goodwill Games
Gold medal – first place	1986 Moscow	Triple jump
Silver medal – second place	1990 Seattle	Triple jump
Silver medal – second place	1994 St. Petersburg	Triple jump
Summer Universiade
Silver medal – second place	1983 Edmonton	Triple jump
- Updated on May 5, 2012

Michael Alexander Conley Sr. (born October 5, 1962) is an American former track and field athlete who competed primarily in the triple jump and the long jump. In the triple jump, he won an Olympic gold medal in 1992, silver in 1984, and gold in the 1993 World Championship.

Conley's son, Mike Conley Jr., is a professional basketball player in the National Basketball Association (NBA).

== Competitive career ==
Conley competed collegiately at the University of Arkansas where he won 9 NCAA long jump and triple jump titles. Conley was ranked #1 in the United States 9 times in the triple jump during his professional career. Conley is the former world indoor triple jump record holder and he still holds the U.S. indoor record in the triple jump at 17.76 meters (58 feet, 3.25 inches).

Conley was ranked #1 in the world 6 times in the triple jump during his career and was ranked 8th in the U.S. in the 200 meter dash in 1985. Conley received the USATF Jim Thorpe Award in 1986 and 1992 as the top field events athlete in the U.S. In 2004, Conley was inducted into the United States National Track and Field Hall of Fame.

A 5 ft 11 in (180 cm) basketball player at the point guard position in Luther High School South in Chicago and in college (only during his freshman year), Conley relied on those skills in winning the Foot Locker Celebrity Slam Dunk Contest in 1988, 1989 and 1992, where he also made the longest dunk ever, a dunk from 2" behind the free-throw line in the final against Olympic long jumper, Mike Powell.

Conley won both the long jump and triple jump titles at the British 1983 AAA Championships.

== Post-competitive career ==
Conley was president and remains on the board of directors of World Sport Chicago, the "living legacy" of Chicago's 2016 Olympic and Paralympic Bid, that focuses on promoting and developing sport programs and events for the youth of Chicago. Chicago had been selected as the U.S. entry into the bid process. Previously, he was the executive director of Elite Athlete's program for USA Track and Field.

Conley is presently serving as chairman on the High Performance committee for USATF.

Conley is also CEO of (MMG) a Sports Management Group as well as CEO of hydrogen-infused water company HTWO.

Conley is registered with the NBA as an agent and represented his son, Mike Conley Jr., and his son's Ohio State teammates Greg Oden and Daequan Cook when they entered the league and currently represents fellow University of Arkansas alum Isaiah Joe of the Oklahoma City Thunder. Oden officially declared for the NBA draft by signing with Mike Sr. as his agent and was subsequently chosen as the number one player in the 2007 NBA draft. Conley Jr. was selected fourth overall. Cook was drafted 21st.

== Rankings ==
Conley had a particularly long and prolific career and he was considered among the world's best for over a decade. Track and Field News ranked him among the top ten triple jumpers in the world 14 consecutive years (six times as world's best) and seven times in the long jump.

Conley was ranked 8th in the U.S. in the 200 meter dash in 1985.

Year	Triple jump		Long jump	
Year	World rank	U.S. rank	World rank	U.S. rank
1982	–	5th	–	6th
1983	4th	2nd	4th	4th
1984	1st	1st	–	5th
1985	2nd	2nd	2nd	2nd
1986	1st	1st	4th	3rd
1987	2nd	1st	7th	4th
1988	5th	1st	–	5th
1989	1st	1st	5th	4th
1990	3rd	2nd	–	–
1991	3rd	2nd	–	–
1992	1st	1st	8th	6th
1993	1st	1st	–	8th
1994	1st	1st	–	–
1995	9th	1st	–	–
1996	4th	2nd	8th	6th

== Personal life ==
Conley went to Luther High School South on Chicago's South Side and led them to the 1980 IHSA Class A State Championship in Basketball. Conley is married to René Corbin Conley and is the father of Boston Celtics point guard Mike Conley Jr., Jordan Conley, Sydney Conley (All-American long jumper at the University of Kansas), and Jon Conley. He is the elder brother of former American football linebacker Steve Conley.
