= Greg Richards (decathlete) =

British decathlete

Personal information
- Nationality: British (English)
- Born: 25 April 1956 (age 69) Birmingham, West Midlands
- Height: 194 cm (6 ft 4 in)
- Weight: 92 kg (203 lb)

Sport
- Sport: Athletics
- Event: decathlon
- Club: North London AC

Gregory Roy Richards (born 25 April 1956) is a retired decathlete from England who competed at the 1988 Summer Olympics

== Biography ==
Richards became the British decathlon champion after winning the British AAA Championships title at the 1985 AAA Championships in Birmingham. The following year at Wrexham, he successfully defended his title at the 1986 AAA Championships.

He represented England in the decathlon event, at the 1986 Commonwealth Games in Edinburgh, Scotland.

He set his personal best (7740 points) in the men's decathlon in 1987.

At the 1988 Olympic Games in Seoul, he represented Great Britain in the decathlon event finishing 30th.

Richards went on to coach many athletes including 2000 Olympic Games decathlon gold medallist Erki Nool of Estonia and 2006 Commonwealth Games English decathlon gold medallist Dean Macey.

== Achievements ==
Year	Competition	Venue	Position	Event	Notes
Representing United Kingdom and England
1988	Olympic Games	Seoul, South Korea	30th	Decathlon	
