= Theodoros Tantanozis =

Greek triple jumper (born 1964)

Personal information
- Born: 29 September 1964 (age 61)

Sport
- Sport: Track and field
Medal record
Representing Greece
Mediterranean Games
| Bronze medal – third place | 1987 Latakia | Triple jump |

Theodoros Tantanozis (born 29 September 1964) is a retired Greek triple jumper.

He finished eleventh at the 1983 European Junior Championships, won the bronze medal at the 1987 Mediterranean Games, won the bronze medal at the 1988 Balkan Games, finished fourth at the 1991 Mediterranean Games, ninth at the 1992 European Indoor Championships fourth at the 1993 Mediterranean Games. He also competed at the 1991 World Indoor Championships without reaching the final.

He became Greek champion in 1990, 1991 and 1993 as well as long jump champion in 1987.

His personal best jump was 16.64 metres, achieved in June 1991 in Barcelona.
