= Peter Bouschen =

German triple jumper

Peter Bouschen (born 16 May 1960 in Düsseldorf) is a retired West German triple jumper.

His personal best jump was 17.43 metres, achieved in June 1988 in Düsseldorf. This result places him fifth on the German all-time list, behind Ralf Jaros, Charles Friedek, Volker Mai and Dirk Gamlin.

He became West German champion in 1981, 1983, 1986 and 1987 and West German indoor champion in 1981 and 1987. He represented the club DJK Agon 08 Düsseldorf.

== Achievements ==
Year	Competition	Venue	Position	Event	Notes
Representing West Germany
1981	European Indoor Championships	Grenoble, France	4th	Triple jump	
1983	World Championships	Helsinki, Finland	9th	Triple jump	
1984	Olympic Games	Los Angeles, United States	5th	Triple jump	16.77 m
1986	European Championships	Stuttgart, West Germany	q	Triple jump	
1987	World Championships	Rome, Italy	7th	Triple jump	
