= Hassan Badra =

Egyptian triple jumper

Personal information
- Nationality: Egyptian
- Born: 19 May 1958 (age 68)

Sport
- Sport: Athletics
- Event: Triple jump
Medal record
Men's athletics
Representing Egypt
African Championships
Silver medal – second place	1982 Cairo	Triple jump

Hassan Badra (born 19 May 1958) is an Egyptian former athlete. He competed in the men's triple jump at the 1984 Summer Olympics.
