= Wolfgang Zinser =

German triple jumper (born 1964)

Personal information
- Born: 26 March 1964 (age 62) Löffingen, Baden-Württemberg, West Germany

Sport
- Sport: Track and field

Wolfgang Zinser (born 26 March 1964) is a retired West German triple jumper. He currently works as an orthopedic doctor, specializing in the use of the patient's own stem cells to treat joint pain.

== Career ==
He finished twelfth at the 1988 European Indoor Championships and competed at the 1986 European Championships without reaching the final.

His personal best jump was 17.33 metres, achieved in September 1988 in Düsseldorf. This result places him sixth on the German all-time performers list, behind Ralf Jaros, Charles Friedek, Volker Mai, Dirk Gamlin and Peter Bouschen.

Zinser became West German champion in 1989, and also won national silver medals in 1985, 1986 and 1988. Indoors he became West German champion in 1988, 1989 and 1990. He represented the sports clubs Salamander Kornwestheim, LG Bayer Leverkusen and TV Wattenscheid.

== Education ==
From 1995 to 1999 he studied medicine at the Heinrich-Heine-Universität Düsseldorf and is now working as doctor in Dinslaken.
