= Norbert Elliott =

Bahamian triple jumper

Personal information
- Nationality: Bahamian
- Born: 6 November 1962 (age 63) Nassau, Bahamas

Sport
- Sport: Athletics
- Event: Triple jump
- College team: UTEP Miners

Norbert Elliott (born 6 November 1962) is a former Bahamian athlete and NCAA coach. He competed in the men's triple jump at the 1988 Summer Olympics and the 1992 Summer Olympics.

== Early life ==
Elliot was born in Nassau, the son of Audley Elliott and Edith Woodside Elliott. He attended St. Augustine’s College where he was coached by Martin Lundy and graduated in 1980.

== Athletics career ==
Elliott attended Wharton County Junior College in Texas, where he was Junior College National Champion in 1981. Elliot transferred to the University of Texas at El Paso (UT El Paso), where he was conference champion in the Triple Jump and twice named All-American.

In 1987, Elliott represented the Bahamas at the World Championships in Rome, where he finished 9th overall in the triple jump. In 1988, he represented the Bahamas at the Seoul Olympics where he finished 10th.

== Coaching career ==
In 1989 Elliott became a graduate assistant coach while studying for a Masters degree in Education at UT El Paso. Three years later, he became an assistant coach at the University of Georgia.

Ten years later, he became head coach at Murray State University followed by a seven-year stint as assistant coach at the University of Tennessee and two years at Campbell University before he became assistant coach at Purdue University in 2015.

In 2018, Elliot was promoted to head coach at Purdue and retired in June 2024. During his 12 years at Purdue, Elliott led the Boilermakers to numerous achievements, including securing a Big Ten team championship in 2017 and achieving the highest NCAA cross country team placement in almost 70 years in 2019. His tenure was also marked by numerous school records, All-American honours, and multiple top-10 individual finishes on the national stage.

In 2001, Elliot also served as the men’s head team coach for the Bahamas at the World Championships.

== Awards and legacy ==
Elliot has also coached 50 All-Americans, 8 individual NCAA champions, NFL running back Raheem Mostert, and 10 Olympians, including Debbie Ferguson, Devynne Charlton, Samson Colebrooke, and Carmiesha Cox.

Elliot was awarded the title of Mideast Assistant Sprints Coach of the Year in 2017 and the Great Lakes Region Men’s Coach of the Year for 2019-20.

== Personal life ==
In 1989, Elliott married his college girlfriend, Trudy Palacio. The couple first had a daughter then four sons. His wife died in 2009.

In 2015, Elliott married his second wife, Angela Goodman. Goodman-Elliott is an assistant athletics coach at Purdue.
