= Norifumi Yamashita =

Japanese triple jumper

Personal information
- Nationality: Japanese
- Born: 10 September 1962 (age 64) Mie Prefecture, Japan
- Education: University of Tsukuba
- Height: 1.78 m (5 ft 10 in)
- Weight: 66 kg (146 lb)

Sport
- Country: Japan
- Sport: Track and field
- Event: Triple jump

Achievements and titles
- Personal bests: Outdoor: 17.15 m (1986); Indoor: 16.70 m (1992)
Medal record
Men's athletics
Representing Japan
Asian Games
Gold medal – first place	1986 Seoul	Triple jump

Norifumi Yamashita (山下 訓史, Yamashita Norifumi) (born 10 September 1962) is a retired Japanese triple jumper. He was the first Japanese to jump over 17 metres in the event. His personal best jump was 17.15 metres, achieved in June 1986 in Tokyo.

His children are also track and field athletes. His oldest son Kohei Yamashita is also triple jumper and competed at the 2016 Olympic Games. His second son Jun Yamashita is a sprinter and competed at the 2019 World Championships. His daughter Toko Yamashita is also triple jumper and finished seventh at the 2020 Japanese Championships.

== Personal bests ==
Event	Performance	Competition	Venue	Date	Notes
Outdoor	17.15 m (+0.9 m/s)	Japanese Championships	Tokyo, Japan	1 June 1986	Current NR
Indoor	16.70 m	Osaka International Indoor Meet	Osaka, Japan	11 February 1992	Current NIR

== Achievements ==
Year	Competition	Venue	Position	Event	Notes
Representing Japan
1985	Universiade	Kobe, Japan	7th	Triple jump	16.62 m
1986	Goodwill Games	Moscow, Soviet Union	7th	Triple jump	16.68 m
1986	Asian Games	Seoul, South Korea	1st	Triple jump	17.01 m
1987	Universiade	Zagreb, Yugoslavia	6th	Triple jump	16.52 m
1988	Olympic Games	Seoul, South Korea	12th	Triple jump	15.62 m
1991	World Championships	Tokyo, Japan	11th	Triple jump	16.26 m
1992	Olympic Games	Barcelona, Spain	30th (q)	Triple jump	15.97 m

== National titles ==
- Japanese Championships
  - Triple jump: 1985, 1986, 1987, 1988, 1992, 1995, 1996
