= Vlastimil Mařinec =

Czech long and triple jumper

Vlastimil Mařinec (born 9 January 1957) is a Czech retired long and triple jumper who competed for Czechoslovakia.

== Career ==
Mařinec was raised in the Pacov athletics club.

Mařinec finished fifth at the 1983 World Championships and won the silver medal at the 1984 European Indoor Championships, In the long jump he competed at the 1983 World Championships without reaching the final.

Mařinec became Czechoslovak champion in 1980, 1981, 1983 and 1984 as well as in long jump in 1983; and Czechoslovak indoor champion in 1981.

His personal best jump was 17.21 metres, achieved in June 1983 in Bratislava.
