= Aleksandr Kovalenko (athlete) =

Belarusian Olympian

Medal record

Men's Athletics

Representing Soviet Union

Olympic Games
Bronze medal – third place	1988 Seoul	Triple Jump

Aleksandr Yuryevich Kovalenko (Belarusian: Аляксандр Юр'евіч Каваленка; born 8 May 1963) is a Belarusian retired USSR triple jumper who won the bronze medal at the 1988 Summer Olympics. In July 1987 he achieved a personal best jump of 17.77 metres, which puts him 16th in the all-time performers list. Kovalenko trained at Armed Forces sports society in Leningrad.
