= Dario Badinelli =

Italian triple jumper (born 1960)

Personal information
- National team: Italy
- Born: 18 August 1960 (age 65) Ghedi, Brescia, Italy
- Height: 1.85 m (6 ft 1 in)
- Weight: 68 kg (150 lb)

Sport
- Sport: Athletics
- Event: Triple jumper
- Club: Snia Milano

Achievements and titles
- Personal best: Triple jump: 17.12 m (1986)
Medal record
| Event | 1st | 2nd | 3rd |
|---|---|---|---|
| Mediterranean Games | 0 | 1 | 0 |
| European Cup | 0 | 0 | 1 |
| Total | 0 | 1 | 1 |

Dario Badinelli (born 10 August 1960) is a retired Italian triple jumper.

== Career ==
Dario Badinelli won two medals at the senior level at the International athletics competitions. He participated in one edition of the Summer Olympics (1984) and has 56 caps in the national team from 1981 to 1993. He suffered from atrophy of the right arm, a characteristic that distinguished his jumping.

== Achievements ==
| Year | Competition | Venue | Position | Notes |
|---|---|---|---|---|
| 1982 | European Championships | Athens, Greece | 9th | 16.05 |
| 1983 | European Indoor Championships | Budapest, Hungary | 6th | 16.23 |
| 1983 | Mediterranean Games | Casablanca, Morocco | 2nd | 16.50 |
| 1984 | European Indoor Championships | Gothenburg, Sweden | 8th | 16.43 |
| 1984 | Olympic Games | Los Angeles, United States | 15th | 16.13 |
| 1985 | European Indoor Championships | Athens, Greece | 6th | 16.42 |
| 1986 | European Indoor Championships | Madrid, Spain | 7th | 16.67 |
| 1987 | World Championships | Rome, Italy | 11th | 16.63 |
| 1988 | European Indoor Championships | Budapest, Hungary | 10th | 16.54 |
| 1989 | European Indoor Championships | The Hague, Netherlands | 5th | 16.62 |
| 1989 | European Cup | Gateshead, United Kingdom | 3rd | 16.50 |
| 1990 | European Indoor Championships | Glasgow, United Kingdom | 7th | 16.27 |
| 1991 | World Indoor Championships | Seville, Spain | 8th | 16.62 |

== National titles ==
He has won seventeen individual national championship titles.

- 10 wins in the triple jump (1983, 1985, 1985, 1986, 1987, 1988, 1989, 1990, 1991, 1992)
- 7 wins in the triple jump indoor (1984, 1985, 1988, 1989, 1990, 1991, 1992)
