= Jacek Pastusiński =

Polish triple jumper

Jacek Pastusiński (born 8 September 1964 in Majdan Królewski, Podkarpackie) is a retired male triple jumper from Poland.

== Achievements ==
Year	Competition	Venue	Position	Event	Notes
Representing Poland
1987	World Championships	Rome, Italy	5th	Triple jump	
1988	Olympic Games	Seoul, South Korea	8th	Triple jump	
