= Ajayi Agbebaku =

Nigerian triple jumper (born 1955)

Personal information
- Born: 12 June 1955 (age 71) Benin City, Nigeria
Medal record
Men's athletics
Representing Nigeria
World Championships
Bronze medal – third place	1983 Helsinki	Triple jump
African Championships
Gold medal – first place	1979 Dakar	Long jump
Gold medal – first place	1979 Dakar	Triple jump
Silver medal – second place	1984 Rabat	Triple jump
Summer Universiade
Gold medal – first place	1983 Edmonton	Triple jump

Ajayi Agbebaku (born 6 December 1955) is a retired Nigerian Olympian who competed in the triple jump. He still holds the indoor record at the University of Missouri with his jump of 16.60 metres at the 1978 NCAA indoor championships.

His personal best jump was 17.26 metres, achieved in July 1983 in Edmonton. This is the Nigerian record as well as second in Africa, only behind Ndabazinhle Mdhlongwa. He holds the African indoor record with 17.00 metres, achieved in January 1982 in Dallas.

== Achievements ==
Year	Competition	Venue	Position	Event	Notes
Representing Nigeria
1979	African Championships	Dakar, Senegal	1st	Long jump	7.94 m
1979	African Championships	Dakar, Senegal	1st	Triple jump	16.82 m
1983	World Championships	Helsinki, Finland	3rd	Triple jump	17.18 m
1984	African Championships	Rabat, Morocco	2nd	Triple jump	16.96 m
1984	Olympic Games	Los Angeles, United States	7th	Triple jump	16.67 m
