= José Leitão =

Portuguese athlete (born 1965)

Personal information
- Nationality: Portuguese
- Born: 6 April 1965 (age 61) Porto, Portugal

Sport
- Sport: Athletics
- Events: Long jump Triple jump

José Luís Banquart Leitão (born 6 April 1965) is a Portuguese athlete. He competed in the men's long jump and the men's triple jump at the 1988 Summer Olympics.
