= Marios Hadjiandreou =

Cypriot triple jumper

Personal information
- Born: September 19, 1962 (age 64) Nicosia, Cyprus

Sport
- Sport: Track and field
Medal record
Representing Cyprus
Commonwealth Games
Gold medal – first place	1990 Auckland	Triple jump
Mediterranean Games
Gold medal – first place	1987 Latakia	Triple jump
Gold medal – first place	1991 Athens	Triple jump

Marios Hadjiandreou (Greek: Μάριος Χατζηανδρέου; born September 19, 1962) is a Cypriot triple jumper who won gold medals in Commonwealth Games and Mediterranean Games.

He won the gold medal in both the 1987 and 1991 Mediterranean Games. In 1990, he became the first Cypriot to win a gold medal in the Commonwealth Games, beating the English world class athlete Jonathan Edwards who later became World Champion and Olympic champion.

He participated in the Olympic Games with Cyprus, in 1988, placing 21st with a 15.95m jump, and in 1992, placing 37th with a 15.64m jump. He was the flag bearer for the Cyprus Olympic team on both occasions.

He was national champion 12 times and is the Cyprus Record holder with 17.13m since 1991. He won 12 times in the European Cup (athletics) and three gold medals in the Games of the Small States of Europe in 1991, 1993, 1995.

== International competitions ==
Year	Competition	Venue	Position	Event	Notes
Representing Cyprus
1982	Commonwealth Games	Brisbane, Australia	7th	Triple jump	16.31 m
1984	European Indoor Championships	Gothenburg, Sweden	12th	Triple jump	15.83 m
1985	European Indoor Championships	Piraeus, Greece	10th	Triple jump	15.93 m
1985	Universiade	Kobe, Japan	9th	Triple jump	16.13 m
1986	European Indoor Championships	Madrid, Spain	8th	Triple jump	16.43 m
1986	European Championships	Stuttgart, West Germany	22nd (q)	Triple jump	15.50 m (−2.7 m/s)
1987	Universiade	Zagreb, Yugoslavia	13th (q)	Triple jump	15.96 m
1987	Mediterranean Games	Latakia, Syria	1st	Triple jump	16.49 m
1988	European Indoor Championships	Budapest, Hungary	6th	Triple jump	16.74 m
1990	Commonwealth Games	Auckland, New Zealand	1st	Triple jump	16.95 m
1990	European Indoor Championships	Glasgow, United Kingdom	10th	Triple jump	15.83 m
1990	European Championships	Split, Yugoslavia	10th	Triple jump	16.63 m (+1.5 m/s)
1991	World Indoor Championships	Seville, Spain	15th (q)	Triple jump	15.97 m
1991	Games of the Small States of Europe	Andorra la Vella, Andorra	1st	Triple jump	16.52 m
1991	Mediterranean Games	Athens, Greece	1st	Triple jump	17.13 m
1992	European Indoor Championships	Genoa, Italy	15th	Triple jump	15.85 m
1992	Olympic Games	Barcelona, Spain	39th (q)	Triple jump	15.64 m
1993	Games of the Small States of Europe	Valetta, Malta	1st	Triple jump	15.65 m
1994	Commonwealth Games	Victoria, Canada	15th (q)	Triple jump	15.89 m
1994	European Championships	Helsinki, Finland	16th (q)	Triple jump	16.07 m (−2.5 m/s)
1995	Games of the Small States of Europe	Luxembourg City, Luxembourg	1st	Triple jump	16.04 m
