= Joseph Taiwo =

Nigerian triple jumper

Personal information
- Nationality: Nigerian
- Born: 24 August 1959 (age 66) in Ibadan, Oyo, Nigeria
- Height: 183 cm (6 ft 0 in)
- Weight: 74 kg (163 lb)

Sport
- Sport: Athletics
- Event: Triple Jump
- Club: Washington State Cougars
Medal record
Men's athletics
Representing Nigeria
African Championships
Gold medal – first place	1984 Rabat	Triple jump

Joseph Taiwo (born 24 August 1959) is a retired Nigerian athlete who competed in the triple jump at the 1984 Summer Olympics and the 1988 Summer Olympics.

== Biography ==
His personal best was 17.22 metres, achieved in June 1988 in Bauchi. This ranks him second among Nigerian triple jumpers, behind Ajayi Agbebaku, and fifth in Africa, behind Ndabazinhle Mdhlongwa, Agbebaku, Khotso Mokoena and Andrew Owusu.

Taiwo won the British AAA Championships title at the 1986 AAA Championships.

Taiwo was a Pac-10 Conference champion for the Washington State Cougars track and field team as an athlete, and he later went on to coach the Washington Huskies track and field jumps team as a volunteer assistant.

He is the father of American decathlete Jeremy Taiwo. Taiow currently coaches jumps at Newport High School in Bellevue Washington.

== Achievements ==
Year	Competition	Venue	Position	Event	Notes
Representing Nigeria
1984	African Championships	Rabat, Morocco	1st	Triple jump	17.19 m
1984	Olympic Games	Los Angeles, United States	9th	Triple jump	16.64 m
1987	World Indoor Championships	Indianapolis, United States	6th	Triple jump	16.65 m
1987	World Championships	Rome, Italy	5th	Triple jump	17.29 m
1987	All-Africa Games	Nairobi, Kenya	2nd	Triple jump	16.90 m
1988	Olympic Games	Seoul, South Korea	9th	Triple jump	16.46 m
