= Ivan Slanař =

Czechoslovak triple jumper

Ivan Slanař (born 11 January 1961) is a retired Czechoslovak triple jumper.

He was born in Kolín and represented the club Dukla Praha. He finished tenth at the 1987 World Championships, seventh at the 1988 European Indoor Championships, and seventh at the 1988 Olympic Games.

He became Czechoslovak champion in 1987, and Czechoslovak indoor champion in 1985. His personal best jump was 17.25 metres, achieved in June 1987 in Bratislava.
