= Oleg Protsenko =

Medal record

Men's athletics

Representing Soviet Union

European Championships
Bronze medal – third place	1986 Stuttgart	Triple jump

Oleg Valeryevich Protsenko (Russian: Олег Валерьевич Проценко; born 11 August 1963 in Soltsy, Novgorod, USSR) is a former Soviet athlete.

He was one of the world's finest triple jumpers during the 1980s. However, his record at major championships was rather poor in comparison with his prowess at minor meets. Already a fine triple-jumper in 1983, Protsenko rocketed to the top of the year's lists in 1984 with 17.52m leap in 1984. Bad for him was that he was denied of competing at the Olympic Games in L.A. due to Soviet boycott. His winning triple jump at the Olympic boycott meet in Moscow of 17.46m was 20 cm longer than that of the Olympic champion in Los Angeles. Oleg begun 1985 with unlucky 4th-place finish at the inaugural World Indoor Games in Paris, but improved upon that, setting European Record on 4 August in Leningrad with a triple jump of 17.69m. He lost his record only several days later to Christo Markov (Bulgaria), but picked his first international medal later in the season when finished second to World Record holder Willie Banks (USA) at the World Cup in Canberra with fine 17.47m.

Protsenko added bronze at the next years European Championships in Stuttgart and had dream start of 1987 season breaking the World Indoor Record on 15 January in Osaka, leaping 17.67m. He had memorable battle with Mike Conley (USA) on 27 February in New York, losing his freshly set record, but recording 17.57m for second place. Several days later he won silver at the World Indoor Championships in Indianapolis again finishing behind Conley. It seemed that Protsenko is destined for a medal at the World Outdoor Champs in Rome when winning at European Cup in Prague with 17.61m, but he finished only 8th in Rome with 17.23m. Protsenko was one more time favoured to win a medal at 1988 Olympics in Seoul. He was lying in third place until the final round when his compatriot Igor Lapshin leapt 17.52m to deny Oleg of major medal. His season's best of 17.68m would earn him gold. Protsenko enjoyed one of his finest seasons in 1990 improving his PB to 17.75m on 10 June in Moscow. He led the qualifying round at the European Championships in Split with 17.41m, but in the final he was able to manage only 16.80m for 8th place to finish his international career without major gold.

== Achievements ==
Year	Competition	Venue	Position	Event	Notes
Representing the Soviet Union
1984	Friendship Games	Moscow, Soviet Union	1st	Triple jump	17.46 m
1986	European Championships	Stuttgart, West Germany	3rd	Triple jump	17.28 m w (wind: +2.6 m/s)
1987	World Indoor Championships	Indianapolis, United States	2nd	Triple jump	17.26 m
1987	World Championships	Rome, Italy	8th	Triple jump	17.23 m
1988	Olympic Games	Seoul, South Korea	4th	Triple jump	17.38 m
1990	European Championships	Split, Yugoslavia	8th	Triple jump	16.80 m (wind: +1.3 m/s)
