= Volker Mai =

East German triple jumper (born 1966)

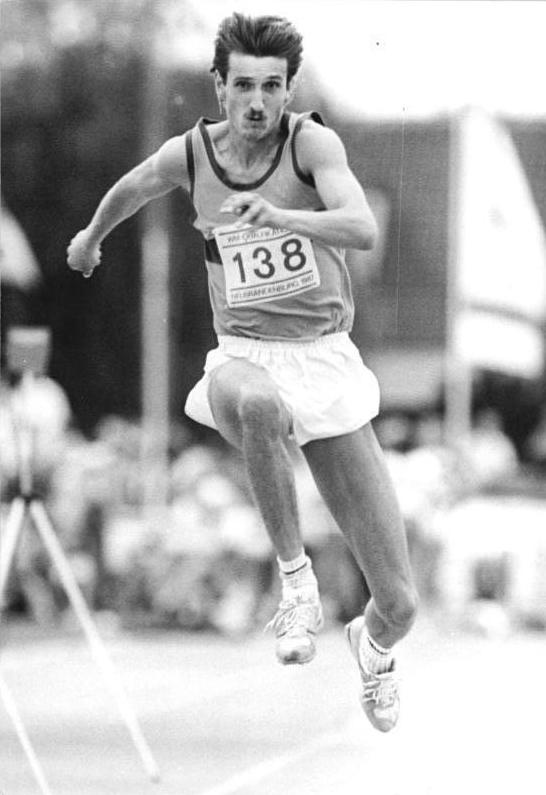
- Volker Mai competing in Neubrandenburg in 1987

Personal information
- Born: 3 May 1966 (age 60) Templin, East Germany

Sport
- Sport: Track and field
Medal record
Representing East Germany
European Indoor Championships
Silver medal – second place	1989 The Hague	Triple jump
Bronze medal – third place	1985 Piraeus	Triple jump

Volker Mai (born 3 May 1966) is a former triple jumper who represented East Germany. Representing SC Neubrandenburg, he holds the current world junior record with 17.50 metres, achieved on 23 June 1985 in Erfurt.

== Biography ==
Mai won his first international medal at the 1985 European Athletics Indoor Championships, where he cleared 17.14 metres (56.2 ft) to take the bronze medal. He then secured a triple jump and long jump double at the 1985 European Athletics Junior Championships held in Cottbus. That same year he ranked second in the triple jump at the 1985 European Cup. The following year he managed seventh at the 1986 European Athletics Championships. Another indoor medal followed at the 1989 European Athletics Indoor Championships and he was the silver medallist behind Nikolay Musiyenko of the USSR. His final appearance for East Germany came at the 1990 European Athletics Championships and he finished fifth behind his compatriot Jörg Friess.

Nationally, he was a four-time East German Indoor triple jump champion (1984, 1985, 1987, 1989) and a two-time East German outdoor champion (1984, 1988). Following German reunification he was the German indoor champion in 1991, 1993 and 1995, and took his sole German outdoor title in 1994. In addition to his ten national titles in the triple jump, he was the 1989 East German champion in the long jump.

Mai was implicated in state-sponsored doping by Werner Franke and Brigitte Berendonk in their book Doping: From Research to Deceit. Based upon research of leaked Stasi files, Franke and Berendonk deduced that Mai had undergone cycles of Oral Turinabol (a banned steroid) in the period of 1982 to 1984.

He then moved to the United States where competed for the Georgia Bulldogs track and field team in the NCAA. He also received his doctorate in microbiology at the University of Georgia. After gaining a master's degree from Harvard School of Public Health, he took up an assistant professorship at the University of Maryland Medical School. He has worked as an assistant microbiology professor at the University of Florida since 2007.

== Achievements ==
Year	Competition	Venue	Position	Event	Notes
Representing East Germany
1985	European Indoor Championships	Piraeus, Greece	3rd	Triple jump	17.14 m
1986	European Championships	Stuttgart, West Germany	7th	Triple jump	16.74 m (wind: 0.0 m/s)
1989	European Indoor Championships	The Hague, Netherlands	2nd	Triple jump	17.03 m
1990	European Championships	Split, Yugoslavia	5th	Triple jump	16.88 m (wind: -0.2 m/s)
Representing Germany
1991	World Indoor Championships	Seville, Spain	5th	Triple jump	16.74 m
1994	European Championships	Helsinki, Finland	14th	Triple jump	16.22 m (wind: +0.3 m/s)
