= Igor Lapshin =

Soviet triple jumper

Personal information
- Born: August 8, 1963 (age 63) Minsk, Belarusian SSR, Soviet Union

Sport
- Sport: Track and field
Medal record
Representing Soviet Union
Olympic Games
Silver medal – second place	1988 Seoul	Triple jump
World Indoor Championships
Gold medal – first place	1991 Seville	Triple jump
European Championships
Bronze medal – third place	1990 Split	Triple jump
European Indoor Championships
Gold medal – first place	1990 Glasgow	Triple jump
Summer Universiade
Gold medal – first place	1989 Duisburg	Triple jump

Igor Olegovich Lapshin (Belarusian: Ігар Алегавіч Лапшын; born August 8, 1963) is a retired male triple jumper who represented the USSR. Best known for his 1988 Olympic silver medal, he also won the 1991 World Indoor Championships as well as one European Indoor title. In July 1988 Lapshin achieved a personal best jump of 17.69 metres, which puts him 21st in the all-time performers list.

== Achievements ==
Year	Competition	Venue	Position	Event	Notes
Representing Soviet Union
1988	Summer Olympics	Seoul, South Korea	2nd	Triple jump	17.52 m
1990	European Indoor Championships	Glasgow, Scotland	1st	Triple jump	17.14 m
1990	European Championships	Split, Yugoslavia	3rd	Triple jump	17.34 m
1991	World Indoor Championships	Seville, Spain	1st	Triple jump	17.31 m
