= Willie Banks =

American triple jumper (born 1956)

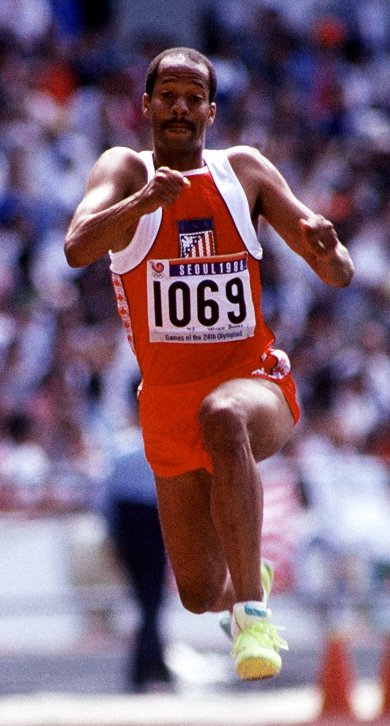
- Banks in 1988

Personal information
- Full name: William Augustus Banks III
- Born: March 11, 1956 (age 70)

Sport
- Coached by: Randy Huntington
Medal record
Men's athletics
Representing the United States
World Championships
Silver medal – second place	1983 Helsinki	Triple jump
Pan American Games
Silver medal – second place	1979 San Juan	Triple jump
Summer Universiade
Gold medal – first place	1979 Mexico City	Triple jump
Bronze medal – third place	1977 Sofia	Triple jump

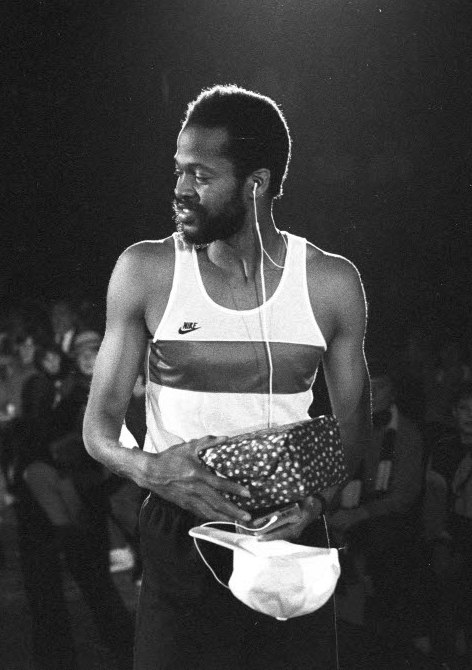
Banks in 1984

William Augustus Banks III (born March 11, 1956) is an American athlete. Born at Travis Air Force Base, California, he grew up in San Diego County and went to Oceanside High School. Banks is an Eagle Scout.

== Track and Field ==
Banks was a track & field athlete competing in the triple jump. On June 16, 1985, he set a world record of 17.97 m (58 feet 11.5 inches) at the national championships in Indianapolis, Indiana, USA. He finished second in the NCAA Championships in 1977 and 1978. He earned his B.A. and Juris Doctor (J.D.) from UCLA. He broke the American triple jump record in 1981. He qualified for the 1980 U.S. Olympic team but did not compete due to the U.S. Olympic Committee's boycott of the 1980 Summer Olympics in Moscow, Russia. He was one of 461 athletes to receive a Congressional Gold Medal instead.

Banks was a member of the 1984 and 1988 Olympic teams and participated with the 1983 and 1987 IAAF World Championships in Athletics World Championship teams. He was awarded the Track & Field News and United States Olympic Committee Athlete of the Year in 1985 and won the Jesse Owens Award as the Outstanding Athlete in Track and Field. Banks also won the British AAA Championships titles at the 1985 AAA Championships and 1991 AAA Championships.

He served USA Track & Field as chair of the Athletes Advisory Committee in addition to serving as an organization vice president.

He is the originator of the now common hand clapping that takes place during many track and field events, and which he first did at DN-galan in 1981.

Banks exuberant personality was also present in his jumping. He has been reported as laughing during some of his jumps. When he set the world record of 17.97 m at the 1985 USA Outdoor Track and Field Championships, his attention seemed more intent on completing his jump in order to cheer for teammate Louise Romo who was completing her 800 metres on the track adjacent to the runway at the same time. He held that record for over ten years until Jonathan Edwards broke it for the first time in 1995 with 17.98m. He also jumped 18.20m at Indianapolis in 1988, but this was assisted by an over the limit wind reading of 5.2 m/s. Held Masters Triple Jump (M45 & M60) and Masters High Jump (M55 & M60) Records.

== Hall of Fame ==
Banks was inducted into the USA National Track & Field Hall of Fame in 1999 and was still competing at an advanced age. In 2006, he cleared an impressive 14.00 m to head the 2006 World Masters rankings in the 50–54 age group, just 7 cm behind that age-group's world record. He won the 2007 World Masters Athletics Championships in that same age group. On September 22, 2012, Banks became the oldest American to clear 6 feet in the high jump at the age of 56 using just a 3-step approach and the classic "roll" technique. For that performance, Banks was named the USATF Athlete of the Week.

== US Olympians Association ==
Banks was President of the US Olympians Association from 2005 to 2008. In 2008 he joined the newly reconstituted USATF Board of Directors. Banks was on a panel on an ESPN "Outside the Lines" episode regarding athlete involvement in social issues, dated May 18, 2008.

== ANOC 2019 World Beach Games ==
Banks serves as the President & Chief Executive Officer of the Local Organizing Committee of ANOC 2019 World Beach Games San Diego 2019, the inaugural World Beach Games.

== Rankings ==
Banks was ranked among the best in the US and the world over the incredible spread of 18 seasons from 1975 to 1992, including twice world number 1 in 1981 and 1985, according to the votes of the experts of Track and Field News.

triple jump
Year	World rank	US rank
1975	-	8th
1976	-	4th
1977	5th	2nd
1978	-	3rd
1979	5th	2nd
1980	2nd	1st
1981	1st	1st
1982	5th	1st
1983	2nd	1st
1984	6th	3rd
1985	1st	1st
1986	8th	3rd
1987	7th	2nd
1988	7th	2nd
1989	-	8th
1990	-	-
1991	-	3rd
1992	-	9th

== See also ==
- World Fit

Records
Preceded by (Brazil) João Carlos de Oliveira	Men's Triple Jump World Record Holder; 1985-06-16 – 1995-07-18	Succeeded by (United Kingdom) Jonathan Edwards
