= Charles Simpkins =

American triple jumper

Personal information
- Born: October 19, 1963 (age 62) Aiken, South Carolina, U.S.
Medal record
Men's athletics
Representing United States
Olympic Games
Silver medal – second place	1992 Barcelona	Triple jump
Summer Universiade
Gold medal – first place	1985 Kobe	Triple jump
Gold medal – first place	1987 Zagreb	Triple jump

Charles "Charlie" Simpkins (born October 19, 1963) is an American athlete who competed mainly in the triple jump. He was born in Aiken, South Carolina.

Simpkins competed for the Charleston Southern Buccaneers track and field team in the NCAA.

He competed for the United States in the 1992 Summer Olympics held in Barcelona, Spain in the triple jump where he won the silver medal. He had previously represented the United States at the 1988 Summer Olympics, finishing 5th.
