= Khristo Markov =

Bulgarian triple jumper (born 1965)

Personal information
- Full name: Khristo Ganchev Markov
- Born: 27 January 1965 (age 61) Dimitrovgrad, Bulgaria
Medal record
Men's athletics
Representing Bulgaria
Olympic Games
Gold medal – first place	1988 Seoul	Triple jump
World Championships
Gold medal – first place	1987 Rome	Triple jump
World Indoor Championships
Gold medal – first place	1985 Paris	Triple jump
European Championships
Gold medal – first place	1986 Stuttgart	Triple jump
Silver medal – second place	1990 Split	Triple jump
European Indoor Championships
Gold medal – first place	1985 Athens	Triple jump
Silver medal – second place	1987 Lievin	Triple jump

Khristo Ganchev Markov (Bulgarian: Христо Ганчев Мaрков; born 27 January 1965, in Dimitrovgrad) is a former triple jumper from Bulgaria, best known for becoming Olympic champion in 1988. He also won the European and world championships. Markov was also the coach of compatriot Tereza Marinova (between 1997 and 2008), who won gold in the same discipline at the 2000 Olympics.

== Personal bests ==
- Triple jump - 17.92 (1987)
- Long jump - 8.23
- Pole vault - 5.40 (1994)
