= Ján Čado =

Slovak triple jumper

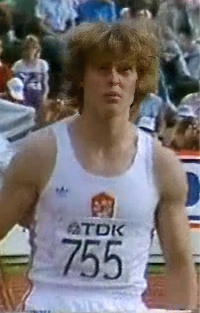
Ján Čado

Ján Čado (born 7 May 1963, in Trstena) is a retired Slovak triple jumper who represented Czechoslovakia during his active career.

His personal best results was 17.34 metres, achieved in May 1984 in Bratislava.

== International competitions ==
Year	Competition	Venue	Position	Notes
1983	World Championships	Helsinki, Finland	6th	Triple jump
1985	World Indoor Games	Paris, France	5th	Triple jump
1985	World Indoor Games	Paris, France	5th	Long jump
1985	European Indoor Championships	Piraeus, Greece	2nd	Triple jump
1987	World Indoor Championships	Indianapolis, United States	10th	Triple jump
