= 1997 World Championships in Athletics – Men's 1500 metres =

These are the official results of the Men's 1.500 metres event at the 1997 World Championships in Athens, Greece. There were a total number of 44 participating athletes, with four qualifying heats, two semifinals and the final held on Wednesday 6 August 1997. The winning margin was 0.80 seconds.

The final was a slow, tactical race from the start, with Morceli tracking El Guerrouj all the way. Estevez tried to slow the pace down even further in the second lap to allow Cacho to save energy for his fast sprint finish. With the whole field still bunched up with 600m to go, El Guerrouj put on a burst of speed which only Morceli and Cacho were able to follow, but eventually, they too were dropped as El Guerrouj wound up the pace faster and faster. Cacho sprinted past Morceli in the home straight, and the dispirited defending champion slowed down towards the finish, allowing Estevez to pip him at the line for the bronze medal.

== Results ==
=== Heats ===
- Held on Sunday 1997-08-03

Heat	Rank	Name	Result	Notes
3	1	Reyes Estévez (ESP)	3:36.20	Q
3	2	Azzeddine Seddiki (MAR)	3:36.40	Q
3	3	Mohamed Suleiman (QAT)	3:36.64	Q
3	4	Graham Hood (CAN)	3:36.69	Q
4	5	Hicham El Guerrouj (MAR)	3:36.72	Q
3	6	Steve Holman (USA)	3:36.72	Q
3	7	Robert Kiplagat Andersen (DEN)	3:36.77	q
4	8	Fermin Cacho (ESP)	3:37.16	Q
1	9	Noureddine Morceli (ALG)	3:37.26	Q
1	10	Andrey Zadorozhniy (RUS)	3:37.28	Q
1	11	John Mayock (GBR)	3:37.37	Q
1	12	Kevin Sullivan (CAN)	3:37.42	Q
4	13	Ali Hakimi (TUN)	3:37.43	Q
4	14	Nadir Bosch (FRA)	3:37.45	Q
4	15	Gennaro Di Napoli (ITA)	3:37.50	Q
1	16	Niall Bruton (IRL)	3:37.57	Q
1	17	Antonio Travassos (POR)	3:37.70	q
1	18	Saïd Chébili (FRA)	3:37.75	q
3	19	Branko Zorko (CRO)	3:37.99	q
4	20	Ahmed Krama (ALG)	3:38.02	
1	21	Julius Achon (UGA)	3:38.21	
4	22	Matthew Yates (GBR)	3:38.34	
3	23	Alexandru Vasile (ROM)	3:39.01	
4	24	Piotr Rostkowski (POL)	3:39.52	
2	25	Rudiger Stenzel (GER)	3:40.17	Q
4	25	Jason Pyrah (USA)	3:40.17	
2	27	Kevin McKay (GBR)	3:40.25	Q
4	28	Panagiotis Papoulias (GRE)	3:40.30	
2	29	Driss Maazouzi (MAR)	3:40.39	Q
2	30	Isaac Viciosa (ESP)	3:40.41	Q
2	31	Laban Rotich (KEN)	3:40.43	Q
2	32	Vyacheslav Shabunin (RUS)	3:40.46	
2	33	Abdelkader Chekhemani (FRA)	3:41.02	
2	34	Mohamed Ibrahim Aden (SOM)	3:41.23	
2	35	Ali Saïdi-Sief (ALG)	3:41.48	
2	36	Babiker Mohammed Yagoub (SUD)	3:41.54	
1	37	John Kibowen (KEN)	3:41.69	
2	38	José López (VEN)	3:42.83	
1	39	Balázs Tölgyesi (HUN)	3:44.16	
1	40	Alexis Sharangabo (RWA)	3:44.95	
3	41	Luis Feiteira (POR)	3:45.37	
4	42	Shane Healy (IRL)	3:50.64	
3	43	Scott Petersen (AUS)	3:50.65	
3	44	Brent Butler (GUM)	3:58.29	

=== Semifinals ===
- Held on Monday 1997-08-04

Heat	Rank	Name	Result	Notes
2	1	Noureddine Morceli (ALG)	3:38.82	Q
2	2	Reyes Estevez (ESP)	3:38.86	Q
2	3	Fermín Cacho (ESP)	3:38.86	Q
1	4	Hicham El Guerrouj (MAR)	3:38.92	Q
2	5	Robert Kiplagat Andersen (DEN)	3:38.92	Q
2	6	Laban Rotich (KEN)	3:38.92	Q
2	7	Nadir Bosch (FRA)	3:39.01	q
2	8	Graham Hood (CAN)	3:39.13	q
1	9	Mohamed Suleiman (QAT)	3:39.15	Q
2	10	Gennaro di Napoli (ITA)	3:39.45	
1	11	Ali Hakimi (TUN)	3:39.50	Q
1	12	Rüdiger Stenzel (GER)	3:39.62	Q
1	13	John Mayock (GBR)	3:39.69	Q
1	14	Kevin Sullivan (CAN)	3:39.84	
1	15	Steve Holman (USA)	3:39.97	
2	16	Driss Maazouzi (MAR)	3:39.99	
2	17	Azzeddine Seddiki (MAR)	3:40.15	
2	18	Kevin McKay (GBR)	3:40.21	
1	19	Branko Zorko (CRO)	3:41.63	
1	20	Saïd Chébili (FRA)	3:41.95	
1	21	Antonio Travassos (POR)	3:42.01	
2	22	Andrey Zadorozhniy (RUS)	3:42.61	
1	23	Niall Bruton (IRL)	3:47.51	
1	—	Isaac Viciosa (ESP)	DNF	

=== Final ===
Rank	Name	Result	Notes
Gold medal	Hicham El Guerrouj (MAR)	3:35.83	
Silver medal	Fermín Cacho (ESP)	3:36.63	
Bronze medal	Reyes Estevez (ESP)	3:37.26	
4.	Noureddine Morceli (ALG)	3:37.37	
5.	Ali Hakimi (TUN)	3:37.51	
6.	Mohamed Suleiman (QAT)	3:37.53	
7.	Graham Hood (CAN)	3:37.55	
8.	Robert Kiplagat Andersen (DEN)	3:37.66	
9.	John Mayock (GBR)	3:38.67	
10.	Rüdiger Stenzel (GER)	3:38.82	
11.	Laban Rotich (KEN)	3:41.27	
12.	Nadir Bosch (FRA)	3:48.35	

== See also ==
- 1994 Men's European Championships 1.500 metres (Helsinki)
- 1996 Men's Olympic 1.500 metres (Atlanta)
- 1998 Men's European Championships 1.500 metres (Budapest)
