= 1997 IAAF World Indoor Championships – Men's 1500 metres =

The men's 1500 metres event at the 1997 IAAF World Indoor Championships was held on 7–8 March 1997.

The winning margin was 1.93 seconds which as of July 2024 remains the only time the men's 1500 metres was won by more than 1.2 seconds at these championships.

== Medalists ==
Gold	Silver	Bronze
Hicham El Guerrouj; Morocco	Rüdiger Stenzel; Germany	William Tanui; Kenya

== Results ==
=== Heats ===
First 3 of each heat (Q) and next 3 fastest (q) qualified for the final.

Rank	Heat	Name	Nationality	Time	Notes
1	3	Rüdiger Stenzel	Germany	3:39.36	Q
2	3	Ali Hakimi	Tunisia	3:39.49	Q
3	3	Kader Chékhémani	France	3:39.52	Q, PB
4	3	Branko Zorko	Croatia	3:39.61	q
5	3	Graham Hood	Canada	3:40.07	q
6	3	Vyacheslav Shabunin	Russia	3:40.13	q
7	1	Hicham El Guerrouj	Morocco	3:40.18	Q
8	1	Niall Bruton	Ireland	3:40.77	Q
9	1	Jason Pyrah	United States	3:41.11	Q
10	2	William Tanui	Kenya	3:41.32	Q
11	2	Andrés Manuel Díaz	Spain	3:41.34	Q
12	1	Luís Feiteira	Portugal	3:41.46	PB
13	1	Balázs Tölgyesi	Hungary	3:41.94	
14	2	Christophe Impens	Belgium	3:41.97	Q
15	1	Ian Campbell	Great Britain	3:42.30	
16	2	Azzeddine Sediki	Morocco	3:42.52	
17	2	Nadir Bosch	France	3:43.10	
18	3	Stephen Agar	Dominica	3:45.33	
19	1	Giuseppe D'Urso	Italy	3:46.06	
20	2	Dominique Loser	Germany	3:48.01	
21	2	Edgar de Oliveira	Brazil	3:51.41	
22	3	Gilbert Mvuyikuri	Burundi	3:51.78	
23	2	Andrea Abelli	Italy	3:57.65	
	1	Ibrahim Adan	Somalia	DNS	
	1	Benson Koech	Kenya	DNS	
	2	Mohamed Yaqoub	Sudan	DNS	
	3	Carlos Sequeira	Nicaragua	DNS	

=== Final ===
Rank	Name	Nationality	Time	Notes
1st place, gold medalist(s)	Hicham El Guerrouj	Morocco	3:35.31	CR
2nd place, silver medalist(s)	Rüdiger Stenzel	Germany	3:37.24	
3rd place, bronze medalist(s)	William Tanui	Kenya	3:37.48	
4	Branko Zorko	Croatia	3:39.25	
5	Andrés Manuel Díaz	Spain	3:39.73	SB
6	Ali Hakimi	Tunisia	3:39.91	
7	Jason Pyrah	United States	3:41.64	
8	Niall Bruton	Ireland	3:42.65	
9	Christophe Impens	Belgium	3:42.89	
10	Vyacheslav Shabunin	Russia	3:44.85	
11	Graham Hood	Canada	3:45.03	
12	Kader Chékhémani	France	3:49.47	
