= 1995 World Championships in Athletics – Men's 1500 metres =

These are the official results of the Men's 1.500 metres event at the 1995 IAAF World Championships in Gothenburg, Sweden. There were a total number of 44 participating athletes, with four qualifying heats, two semi-finals and the final held on Sunday 13th August 1995. The winning margin was 1.55 seconds.

All eyes were on world record holder Noureddine Morceli, who had just improved upon his world record a month earlier. What strategy could beat him? Nobody wanted to try to run fast from the start, Paul McMullen became the early leader and as the largest man in the field, the wind blocker while everybody else was drafting behind. Morceli stayed out of trouble, near the front of the pack, watching around him. After 800 metres Vénuste Niyongabo moved to the outside of McMullen and started to edge forward with Morceli the next man back on the outside marking anybody who dared to get too far in front. With 500 metres to go, Morceli grew impatient and eased into the lead for the bell. The Morceli started to open up his lead. Niyongabo was late to react, giving away a few metres as the lap began and never able to gain any ground. By the home stretch Morceli had more than 10 metres on Niyongabo. Down the home stretch, a 20 year old Hicham El Guerrouj edged by Niyongabo. Morceli slowed before the finish line almost walking across with the gold, the relatively unknown El Guerrouj got the silver and Niyongabo held on for bronze.

== Final ==
RANK	FINAL	TIME
	Noureddine Morceli (ALG)	3:33.73
	Hicham El Guerrouj (MAR)	3:35.28
	Vénuste Niyongabo (BDI)	3:35.56
4.	Rachid El Basir (MAR)	3:35.96
5.	Kevin Sullivan (CAN)	3:36.73
6.	Abdelkader Chékhémani (FRA)	3:36.90
7.	Mohamed Suleiman (QAT)	3:36.96
8.	Fermín Cacho (ESP)	3:37.02
9.	Gary Lough (GBR)	3:37.59
10.	Paul McMullen (USA)	3:38.23
11.	Niall Bruton (IRL)	3:39.15
12.	Isaac Viciosa (ESP)	3:41.12

== Semi-finals ==
- Held on Friday 1995-08-11

RANK	HEAT 1	TIME
1.	Noureddine Morceli (ALG)	3:38.37
2.	Niall Bruton (IRL)	3:39.00
3.	Abdelkader Chékhémani (FRA)	3:39.08
4.	Kevin Sullivan (CAN)	3:39.23
5.	Fermín Cacho (ESP)	3:39.35
6.	Ali Hakimi (TUN)	3:39.40
7.	Eric Dubus (FRA)	3:39.73
8.	Terrance Herrington (USA)	3:39.96
9.	John Mayock (GBR)	3:40.20
10.	Christophe Impens (BEL)	3:44.86
11.	Azzeddine Sediki (MAR)	3:46.84
–	Joaquim Cruz (BRA)	DNS

RANK	HEAT 2	TIME
1.	Hicham El Guerrouj (MAR)	3:37.47
2.	Vénuste Niyongabo (BDI)	3:37.62
3.	Mohamed Suleiman (QAT)	3:37.78
4.	Gary Lough (GBR)	3:37.78
5.	Rachid El Basir (MAR)	3:37.96
6.	Isaac Viciosa (ESP)	3:38.03
7.	Paul McMullen (USA)	3:38.54
8.	Vyacheslav Shabunin (RUS)	3:38.61
9.	Julius Achon (UGA)	3:39.87
10.	Reuben Chesang (KEN)	3:40.63
11.	Samir Benfares (FRA)	3:43.19
12.	Robert Kiplagat Andersen (DEN)	3:46.41

== Qualifying heats ==
- Held on Thursday 1995-08-10

RANK	HEAT 1	TIME
1.	Ali Hakimi (TUN)	3:48.40
2.	Vénuste Niyongabo (BDI)	3:48.58
3.	Samir Benfares (FRA)	3:48.64
4.	John Mayock (GBR)	3:48.65
5.	Paul McMullen (USA)	3:48.70
6.	Branko Zorko (CRO)	3:48.83
7.	Abdi Bile (SOM)	3:48.86
8.	Jens-Peter Herold (GER)	3:49.24
9.	Jonah Birir (KEN)	3:49.26
10.	Mateo Cañellas (ESP)	3:49.71
11.	Xandru Grech (MLT)	3:54.96

RANK	HEAT 2	TIME
1.	Noureddine Morceli (ALG)	3:42.58
2.	Fermín Cacho (ESP)	3:43.05
3.	Reuben Chesang (KEN)	3:43.26
4.	Rachid El Basir (MAR)	3:43.29
5.	Kevin Sullivan (CAN)	3:43.41
6.	Kevin McKay (GBR)	3:43.87
7.	Brian Hyde (USA)	3:44.03
8.	Martin Johns (NZL)	3:45.10
9.	Luís Jesus (POR)	3:46.43
10.	José López (VEN)	3:46.81
11.	Werner Edler-Muhr (AUT)	3:47.06

RANK	HEAT 3	TIME
1.	Azzeddine Sediki (MAR)	3:38.24
2.	Gary Lough (GBR)	3:38.62
3.	Eric Dubus (FRA)	3:38.80
4.	Julius Achon (UGA)	3:39.04
5.	Niall Bruton (IRL)	3:39.27
6.	Joaquim Cruz (BRA)	3:39.47
7.	Christophe Impens (BEL)	3:40.37
8.	Rüdiger Stenzel (GER)	3:40.65
9.	Ovidiu Olteanu (ROM)	3:43.20
10.	Nioka Pululu (ZAI)	4:02.68
–	Ahmed Ibrahim Warsama (QAT)	DNS

RANK	HEAT 4	TIME
1.	Hicham El Guerrouj (MAR)	3:38.93
2.	Mohamed Suleiman (QAT)	3:39.06
3.	Vyacheslav Shabunin (RUS)	3:39.21
4.	Abdelkader Chékhémani (FRA)	3:39.34
5.	Terrance Herrington (USA)	3:39.40
6.	Isaac Viciosa (ESP)	3:39.42
7.	Robert Kiplagat Andersen (DEN)	3:40.50
8.	Passmore Furusa (ZIM)	3:41.01
9.	Edgar de Oliveira (BRA)	3:41.74
10.	Sammy Mutai (KEN)	3:44.57
11.	Selwyn Kole (SOL)	4:05.07
