= Athletics at the 1996 Summer Olympics – Men's 1500 metres =

Men's 1500 metres at the Games of the XXVI Olympiad
- Olympic Athletics
- Venue: Centennial Olympic Stadium
- Dates: 29 July 1996 (heats); 1 August 1996 (semi-finals); 3 August 1996 (final)
- Competitors: 57 from 37 nations
- Winning time: 3:35.78

Medalists
1st place, gold medalist(s)		Noureddine Morceli; Algeria
2nd place, silver medalist(s)		Fermín Cacho; Spain
3rd place, bronze medalist(s)		Stephen Kipkorir; Kenya

The men's 1500 metres was an event at the 1996 Summer Olympics in Atlanta, Georgia. There were 57 competitors from 37 nations. The maximum number of athletes per nation had been set at 3 since the 1930 Olympic Congress. The event took place between 29 July and 3 August. The event was won by 0.62 seconds by Noureddine Morceli of Algeria, the nation's first championship in the men's 1500 metres. Fermín Cacho of Spain was unable to repeat as gold medalist, but took silver to become the fourth man to win two medals in the event.

== Summary ==
Algerian Noureddine Morceli had dominated the 1500 for five years, holding the world record and winning the previous three world championships. But Hicham El Guerrouj, from neighboring Morocco was the rising star, who had chased Morceli in the most recent world championships. This was expected to be the match race. While Morceli had led the semi-finals in close to Olympic record time, the final race was much slower and entirely strategic. Approaching the bell at the end of the third lap, Morceli had moved into the lead with El Guerrouj sprinting up to his shoulder. Morceli held him off with El Guerrouj having to cede position and move in behind Morceli squeezing in front of defending champion, master tactician Fermin Cacho who was perfectly positioned directly behind Morceli. Two strides later El Guerrouj tripped and fell. Morceli took off sprinting at the same moment the rest of the field had to evade El Guerrouj's body on the track. Cacho was forced to leap over the fallen El Guerrouj, almost stepping on him. Next in line Abdi Bile had to jump off the track to the infield. Morceli opened up 2 meters in the process, which he widened to 5 down the backstretch. Cacho and Bile held that gap onto the final straight. Bile faded while Cacho held on until he could see it was futile to catch Morceli, jogging in for silver. Stephen Kipkorir led two other Kenyan teammates around Bile to take bronze. After quickly staggering to his feet, El Guerrouj chased the field but shocked and disheartened, he was unable to catch anybody.

== Background ==
This was the 23rd appearance of the event, which is one of 12 athletics events to have been held at every Summer Olympics. All three medalists (Fermín Cacho of Spain, Rachid El Basir of Morocco, and Mohamed Suleiman of Qatar) from 1992 returned, along with seventh-place finisher Noureddine Morceli of Algeria and ninth-place finisher Graham Hood of Canada. Morceli had been favored in Barcelona, and was again a favorite in Atlanta; he had won the last three world championships and broken the world record twice. Hicham El Guerrouj of Morocco was a rising star expected to challenge Morceli; he had come in second at the 1995 world championships and would go on to win the next four and break the world record himself. Vénuste Niyongabo of Burundi would have been another contender but chose not to enter in order to focus on the 5000 metres.

Burundi, Dominica, the Maldives, the Solomon Islands, and Ukraine each made their first appearance in the event. The United States made its 22nd appearance, most of all nations (having missed only the boycotted 1980 Games).

== Competition format ==
The competition was again three rounds (used previously in 1952 and since 1964). The "fastest loser" system introduced in 1964 was used for both the first round and semifinals. The 12-man semifinals and finals introduced in 1984 and used again in 1992 were used.

There were five heats in the first round, each with 11 or 12 runners. The top four runners in each heat, along with the next four fastest overall, advanced to the semifinals. The 24 semifinalists were divided into two semifinals, each with 12 runners. The top five men in each semifinal, plus the next two fastest overall, advanced to the 12-man final.

== Records ==
These were the standing world and Olympic records prior to the 1996 Summer Olympics.

World record	Noureddine Morceli (ALG)	3:27.37	Nice, France	12 July 1995
Olympic record	Sebastian Coe (GBR)	3:32.53	Los Angeles, United States	11 August 1984

No new world or Olympic records were set during the competition.

== Schedule ==
All times are Eastern Daylight Time (UTC-4)

Date	Time	Round
Monday, 29 July 1996	10:45	Round 1
Wednesday, 31 July 1996	19:55	Semifinals
Saturday, 3 August 1996	19:50	Final

== Results ==
=== Round 1 ===
==== Heat 1 ====
Rank	Athlete	Nation	Time	Notes
1	Laban Rotich	Kenya	3:35.88	Q
2	Marko Koers	Netherlands	3:36.18	Q
3	Niall Bruton	Ireland	3:37.42	Q
4	Kevin McKay	Great Britain	3:38.02	Q
5	Ovidiu Olteanu	Romania	3:38.33	
6	Vyacheslav Shabunin	Russia	3:38.56	
7	Edgar de Oliveira	Brazil	3:40.70	
8	Steve Agar	Dominica	3:43.02	
9	Brian Hyde	United States	3:48.20	
10	Andriy Bulkovskiy	Ukraine	3:53.30	
11	Tawai Keiruan	Vanuatu	4:02.78	

==== Heat 2 ====
Rank	Athlete	Nation	Time	Notes
1	Noureddine Morceli	Algeria	3:41.95	Q
2	John Mayock	Great Britain	3:42.31	Q
3	Abdi Bile	Somalia	3:42.32	Q
4	Reyes Estévez	Spain	3:42.48	Q
5	Rachid El Basir	Morocco	3:42.85	
6	Julius Achon	Uganda	3:43.08	
7	Luis Jesus	Portugal	3:44.65	
8	Joaquim Cruz	Brazil	3:45.32	
9	João N'tyamba	Angola	3:46.41	
10	Ali Ibrahim	Djibouti	3:46.62	
11	Michael Gottschalk	Germany	3:56.46	

==== Heat 3 ====
Rank	Athlete	Nation	Time	Notes
1	Ali Hakimi	Tunisia	3:36.58	Q
2	Stephen Kipkorir	Kenya	3:36.70	Q
3	Balázs Tölgyesi	Hungary	3:36.71	Q
4	Driss Maazouzi	Morocco	3:37.08	Q
5	Shane Healy	Ireland	3:37.28	q
6	Branko Zorko	Croatia	3:37.35	q
7	Mohammed Suleiman	Qatar	3:37.70	q
8	Mickaël Damian	France	3:39.21	
9	Jason Pyrah	United States	3:39.91	
10	António Travassos	Portugal	3:42.01	
11	Martin Johns	New Zealand	3:44.91	
12	Hussain Riyaz	Maldives	4:15.14	

==== Heat 4 ====
Rank	Athlete	Nation	Time	Notes
1	Hicham El Guerrouj	Morocco	3:37.66	Q
2	William Tanui	Kenya	3:37.72	Q
3	Kader Chekhemani	France	3:37.81	Q
4	Isaac Viciosa	Spain	3:37.93	Q
5	Luís Feiteira	Portugal	3:38.09	q
6	Marcus O'Sullivan	Ireland	3:38.16	
7	Peter Philipp	Switzerland	3:41.60	
8	Werner Edler-Muhr	Austria	3:45.02	
9	Alexis Sharangabo	Rwanda	3:46.42	
10	Ali Mabruk Ezayedi	Libya	3:51.49	
—	Graham Hood	Canada	DNF	

==== Heat 5 ====
Rank	Athlete	Nation	Time	Notes
1	Fermín Cacho	Spain	3:39.84	Q
2	Paul McMullen	United States	3:39.94	Q
3	Christophe Impens	Belgium	3:40.16	Q
4	Anthony Whiteman	Great Britain	3:40.74	Q
5	Andrey Loginov	Russia	3:40.99	
6	Dieudonne Kwizera	Burundi	3:41.45	
7	Ahmed Krama	Algeria	3:42.09	
8	Bahadur Prasad	India	3:46.16	
9	Eric Dubus	France	3:47.01	
10	Thomas Ebner	Austria	3:48.38	
11	Paul Cleary	Australia	3:52.85	
12	Selwyn Kole	Solomon Islands	4:03.44	

==== Overall results for round 1 ====
Rank	Athlete	Nation	Time	Notes
1	Laban Rotich	Kenya	3:35.88	Q
2	Marko Koers	Netherlands	3:36.18	Q
3	Ali Hakimi	Tunisia	3:36.58	Q
4	Stephen Kipkorir	Kenya	3:36.70	Q
5	Balázs Tölgyesi	Hungary	3:36.71	Q
6	Driss Maazouzi	Morocco	3:37.08	Q
6	Shane Healy	Ireland	3:37.28	q
8	Branko Zorko	Croatia	3:37.35	q
9	Niall Bruton	Ireland	3:37.42	Q
10	Hicham El Guerrouj	Morocco	3:37.66	Q
11	Mohammed Suleiman	Qatar	3:37.70	q
12	William Tanui	Kenya	3:37.72	Q
13	Kader Chekhemani	France	3:37.81	Q
14	Isaac Viciosa	Spain	3:37.93	Q
15	Kevin McKay	Great Britain	3:38.02	Q
16	Luís Feiteira	Portugal	3:38.09	q
17	Marcus O'Sullivan	Ireland	3:38.16	
18	Ovidiu Olteanu	Romania	3:38.33	
19	Vyacheslav Shabunin	Russia	3:38.56	
20	Mickaël Damian	France	3:39.21	
21	Fermín Cacho	Spain	3:39.84	Q
22	Jason Pyrah	United States	3:39.91	
23	Paul McMullen	United States	3:39.94	Q
24	Christophe Impens	Belgium	3:40.16	Q
25	Anthony Whiteman	Great Britain	3:40.74	Q
26	Peter Philipp	Switzerland	3:41.60	
27	Noureddine Morceli	Algeria	3:41.95	Q
28	John Mayock	Great Britain	3:42.31	Q
29	Abdi Bile	Somalia	3:42.32	Q
30	Reyes Estévez	Spain	3:42.48	Q
31	Edgar de Oliveira	Brazil	3:40.70	
32	Andrey Loginov	Russia	3:40.99	
33	Dieudonne Kwizera	Burundi	3:41.45	
34	António Travassos	Portugal	3:42.01	
35	Ahmed Krama	Algeria	3:42.09	
36	Rachid El Basir	Morocco	3:42.85	
37	Steve Agar	Dominica	3:43.02	
38	Julius Achon	Uganda	3:43.08	
39	Luis Jesus	Portugal	3:44.65	
40	Martin Johns	New Zealand	3:44.91	
41	Werner Edler-Muhr	Austria	3:45.02	
42	Joaquim Cruz	Brazil	3:45.32	
43	Bahadur Prasad	India	3:46.16	
44	João N'tyamba	Angola	3:46.41	
45	Alexis Sharangabo	Rwanda	3:46.42	
46	Ali Ibrahim	Djibouti	3:46.62	
47	Eric Dubus	France	3:47.01	
48	Brian Hyde	United States	3:48.20	
49	Thomas Ebner	Austria	3:48.38	
50	Ali Mabruk Ezayedi	Libya	3:51.49	
51	Paul Cleary	Australia	3:52.85	
52	Andriy Bulkovskiy	Ukraine	3:53.30	
53	Michael Gottschalk	Germany	3:56.46	
54	Tawai Keiruan	Vanuatu	4:02.78	
55	Selwyn Kole	Solomon Islands	4:03.44	
56	Hussain Riyaz	Maldives	4:15.14	
—	Graham Hood	Canada	DNF	

=== Semifinals ===
==== Semifinal 1 ====
Rank	Athlete	Nation	Time	Notes
1	Noureddine Morceli	Algeria	3:32.88	Q
2	Fermín Cacho	Spain	3:33.12	Q
3	Abdi Bile	Somalia	3:33.30	Q
4	William Tanui	Kenya	3:33.57	Q
5	Laban Rotich	Kenya	3:33.73	Q
6	Driss Maazouzi	Morocco	3:34.35	q
7	John Mayock	Great Britain	3:34.55	q
8	Kader Chekhemani	France	3:34.84	
9	Branko Zorko	Croatia	3:35.14	
10	Balázs Tölgyesi	Hungary	3:35.57	
11	Luís Feiteira	Portugal	3:40.31	
12	Niall Bruton	Ireland	3:42.88	

==== Semifinal 2 ====
Rank	Athlete	Nation	Time	Notes
1	Hicham El Guerrouj	Morocco	3:35.29	Q
2	Stephen Kipkorir	Kenya	3:35.53	Q
3	Ali Hakimi	Tunisia	3:35.91	Q
4	Mohammed Suleiman	Qatar	3:36.01	Q
5	Marko Koers	Netherlands	3:36.06	Q
6	Isaac Viciosa	Spain	3:36.11	
7	Anthony Whiteman	Great Britain	3:36.11	
8	Christophe Impens	Belgium	3:37.64	
9	Paul McMullen	United States	3:37.81	
10	Reyes Estévez	Spain	3:39.44	
11	Shane Healy	Ireland	3:39.81	
12	Kevin McKay	Great Britain	3:43.61	

==== Overall results for semifinals ====
Rank	Athlete	Nation	Time	Notes
1	Noureddine Morceli	Algeria	3:32.88	Q
2	Abdi Bile	Somalia	3:33.30	Q
3	William Tanui	Kenya	3:33.57	Q
4	Fermín Cacho	Spain	3:33.12	Q
5	Laban Rotich	Kenya	3:33.73	Q
6	Driss Maazouzi	Morocco	3:34.35	q
7	John Mayock	Great Britain	3:34.55	q
8	Kader Chekhemani	France	3:34.84	
9	Branko Zorko	Croatia	3:35.14	
10	Hicham El Guerrouj	Morocco	3:35.29	Q
11	Stephen Kipkorir	Kenya	3:35.53	Q
12	Balázs Tölgyesi	Hungary	3:35.57	
13	Ali Hakimi	Tunisia	3:35.91	Q
14	Mohammed Suleiman	Qatar	3:36.01	Q
15	Marko Koers	Netherlands	3:36.06	Q
16	Isaac Viciosa	Spain	3:36.11	
17	Anthony Whiteman	Great Britain	3:36.11	
18	Christophe Impens	Belgium	3:37.64	
19	Paul McMullen	United States	3:37.81	
20	Reyes Estévez	Spain	3:39.44	
21	Shane Healy	Ireland	3:39.81	
22	Luís Feiteira	Portugal	3:40.31	
23	Niall Bruton	Ireland	3:42.88	
24	Kevin McKay	Great Britain	3:43.61	

=== Final ===
Rank	Athlete	Nation	Time
1st place, gold medalist(s)	Noureddine Morceli	Algeria	3:35.78
2nd place, silver medalist(s)	Fermín Cacho	Spain	3:36.40
3rd place, bronze medalist(s)	Stephen Kipkorir	Kenya	3:36.72
4	Laban Rotich	Kenya	3:37.39
5	William Tanui	Kenya	3:37.42
6	Abdi Bile	Somalia	3:38.03
7	Marko Koers	Netherlands	3:38.18
8	Ali Hakimi	Tunisia	3:38.19
9	Mohammed Suleiman	Qatar	3:38.26
10	Driss Maazouzi	Morocco	3:39.65
11	John Mayock	Great Britain	3:40.18
12	Hicham El Guerrouj	Morocco	3:40.75

== See also ==
- Women's 1500 metres
