= 2001 IAAF World Indoor Championships – Men's 1500 metres =

The men's 1500 metres event at the 2001 IAAF World Indoor Championships was held on March 9–10.

== Medalists ==
Gold	Silver	Bronze
Rui Silva; Portugal	Reyes Estévez; Spain	Noah Ngeny; Kenya

== Results ==
=== Heats ===
First 2 of each heat (Q) and the next 3 fastest (q) qualified for the semifinals.

Rank	Heat	Name	Nationality	Time	Notes
1	3	Rui Silva	Portugal	3:37.79	Q
2	3	Adil Kaouch	Morocco	3:37.90	Q, PB
3	1	Reyes Estévez	Spain	3:37.93	Q
4	1	Noah Ngeny	Kenya	3:38.22	Q
5	1	Hailu Mekonnen	Ethiopia	3:38.41	q
6	1	Julius Achon	Uganda	3:39.14	q
7	3	Juan Carlos Higuero	Spain	3:39.21	q, PB
8	3	Vyacheslav Shabunin	Russia	3:39.40	
9	3	Branko Zorko	Croatia	3:39.55	SB
10	1	Jason Lunn	United States	3:40.42	PB
11	1	Luis Feiteira	Portugal	3:40.68	SB
12	1	Peter Philipp	Switzerland	3:40.93	
13	1	Hudson de Souza	Brazil	3:43.14	
14	3	Marko Koers	Netherlands	3:43.17	
15	3	Darko Radomirović	Yugoslavia	3:46.36	
16	2	Laban Rotich	Kenya	3:47.00	Q
17	2	Seneca Lassiter	United States	3:47.06	Q
18	2	Kevin Sullivan	Canada	3:47.19	
19	2	Daniel Zegeye	Ethiopia	3:47.94	
20	3	Clyde Colenso	South Africa	3:48.07	
21	2	Kamal Boulahfane	Algeria	3:48.59	
22	2	Aléxis Abraham	France	3:49.21	
23	2	Youssef Baba	Morocco	3:49.46	
24	2	Jürgen Vandewiele	Belgium	3:53.42	
25	3	Fortunato Yaccdob	Eritrea	3:56.31	
26	3	Ismail Ahmed Ismail	Sudan	4:02.79	
27	2	Saad Jalal Uddin	Pakistan	4:03.43	
28	2	Youssouf Diallo	Mali	4:06.70	
	1	Alexis Sharangabo	Rwanda	DNS	

=== Final ===
Rank	Name	Nationality	Time	Notes
1st place, gold medalist(s)	Rui Silva	Portugal	3:51.06	
2nd place, silver medalist(s)	Reyes Estévez	Spain	3:51.25	
3rd place, bronze medalist(s)	Noah Ngeny	Kenya	3:51.63	
4	Laban Rotich	Kenya	3:51.71	
5	Adil Kaouch	Morocco	3:51.91	
6	Seneca Lassiter	United States	3:52.39	
7	Hailu Mekonnen	Ethiopia	3:52.72	
8	Julius Achon	Uganda	3:53.03	
9	Juan Carlos Higuero	Spain	3:56.71	
