= 1999 World Championships in Athletics – Men's 1500 metres =

Competition at the World Athletics Championships

These are the official results of the Men's 1500 metres event at the 1999 IAAF World Championships in Seville, Spain. There were a total number of 40 participating athletes, with three qualifying heats, two semi-finals and the final held on Tuesday 24 August 1999 at 21:10h. The winning margin was 1.08 seconds.

== Final ==
RANK	FINAL	TIME
	Hicham El Guerrouj (MAR)	3:27.65
	Noah Ngeny (KEN)	3:28.73
	Reyes Estévez (ESP)	3:30.57
4.	Fermín Cacho (ESP)	3:31.34
5.	Andrés Manuel Díaz (ESP)	3:31.83
6.	Laban Rotich (KEN)	3:33.32
7.	David Lelei (KEN)	3:33.82
8.	Driss Maazouzi (FRA)	3:34.02
9.	Steve Holman (USA)	3:34.32
10.	Graham Hood (CAN)	3:35.35
11.	Adil Kaouch (MAR)	3:47.05
	Noureddine Morceli (ALG)	DNF

== Semi-final ==
- Held on Sunday 22 August 1999

RANK	HEAT 1	TIME
1.	Hicham El Guerrouj (MAR)	3:37.34
2.	Fermín Cacho (ESP)	3:37.88
3.	Reyes Estévez (ESP)	3:38.16
4.	Laban Rotich (KEN)	3:38.20
5.	Driss Maazouzi (FRA)	3:38.32
6.	Ibrahim Mohamed Aden (SOM)	3:38.57
7.	David Krummenacker (USA)	3:39.19
8.	Alí Hakimi (TUN)	3:39.27
9.	Rüdiger Stenzel (GER)	3:39.87
10.	Marko Koers (NED)	3:40.15
11.	Ali Saïdi-Sief (ALG)	3:40.63
12.	Miloud Abaoub (ALG)	3:43.21

RANK	HEAT 2	TIME
1.	Noah Ngeny (KEN)	3:36.13
2.	Andrés Manuel Díaz (ESP)	3:36.33
3.	Adil Kaouch (MAR)	3:36.62
4.	David Lelei (KEN)	3:36.81
5.	Graham Hood (CAN)	3:37.23
6.	Noureddine Morceli (ALG)	3:37.32
7.	Steve Holman (USA)	3:37.52
8.	Abdelkader Chékhémani (FRA)	3:37.77
9.	Julius Achon (UGA)	3:37.82
10.	Rui Silva (POR)	3:50.85
	John Mayock (GBR)	DNF
	Gert-Jan Liefers (NED)	DNF

== Heats ==
- Held on Saturday 21 August 1999

RANK	HEAT 1	TIME
1.	Hicham El Guerrouj (MAR)	3:35.63
2.	Fermín Cacho (ESP)	3:36.43
3.	Laban Rotich (KEN)	3:36.72
4.	Driss Maazouzi (FRA)	3:36.84
5.	Alí Hakimi (TUN)	3:37.25
6.	John Mayock (GBR)	3:37.29
7.	Rüdiger Stenzel (GER)	3:37.31
8.	Graham Hood (CAN)	3:37.39
9.	David Krummenacker (USA)	3:37.85
10.	Miloud Abaoub (ALG)	3:38.40
11.	Vyacheslav Shabunin (RUS)	3:39.70
12.	Zigmund Zilbershtein (GEO)	3:52.76
13.	Liam Byrne (GIB)	4:00.60

RANK	HEAT 2	TIME
1.	Reyes Estévez (ESP)	3:41.24
2.	Ali Saïdi-Sief (ALG)	3:41.34
3.	David Lelei (KEN)	3:41.40
4.	Adil Kaouch (MAR)	3:41.51
5.	Gert-Jan Liefers (NED)	3:41.53
6.	Rui Silva (POR)	3:41.60
7.	Vénuste Niyongabo (BDI)	3:41.87
8.	Dirk Heinze (GER)	3:43.44
9.	Nadir Bosch (FRA)	3:44.46
10.	Kiyoharu Sato (JPN)	3:45.72
11.	Youssef Baba (MAR)	3:48.08
12.	Seneca Lassiter (USA)	3:48.29
13.	Primo Higa (SOL)	4:17.46

RANK	HEAT 3	TIME
1.	Noah Ngeny (KEN)	3:37.41
2.	Noureddine Morceli (ALG)	3:37.63
3.	Andrés Manuel Díaz (ESP)	3:37.68
4.	Abdelkader Chékhémani (FRA)	3:37.74
5.	Steve Holman (USA)	3:37.75
6.	Julius Achon (UGA)	3:37.97
7.	Marko Koers (NED)	3:38.04
8.	Ibrahim Mohamed Aden (SOM)	3:38.10
9.	Salah El Ghazi (MAR)	3:40.31
10.	Hamish Christensen (NZL)	3:41.11
11.	Kevin Sullivan (CAN)	3:43.49
12.	Francis Munthali (MAW)	3:49.97
13.	Bashar Ibrahim (KUW)	3:50.28
14.	Giuseppe D'Urso (ITA)	3:50.71
