= 2001 World Championships in Athletics – Men's 1500 metres =

IAAF 2001

These are the official results of the Men's 1500 metres event at the 2001 IAAF World Championships in Edmonton, Canada. There were a total number of 40 participating athletes, with three qualifying heats, two semi-finals and the final held on Sunday 12 August 2001 at 16:00h. The winning margin was 0.42 seconds.

== Medalists ==
Gold	Hicham El Guerrouj; Morocco (MAR)
Silver	Bernard Lagat; Kenya (KEN)
Bronze	Driss Maazouzi; France (FRA)

== Records ==
Standing records prior to the 2001 World Athletics Championships
World Record	Hicham El Guerrouj (MAR)	3:26.00	July 14, 1998	Rome, Italy
Event Record	Hicham El Guerrouj (MAR)	3:27.65	August 24, 1999	Seville, Spain
Season Best	Hicham El Guerrouj (MAR)	3:28.38	July 6, 2001	Paris, France

== Final ==
RANK	FINAL	TIME
	Hicham El Guerrouj (MAR)	3:30.68
	Bernard Lagat (KEN)	3:31.10
	Driss Maazouzi (FRA)	3:31.54
4.	William Chirchir (KEN)	3:31.91
5.	Reyes Estévez (ESP)	3:32.34
6.	José Antonio Redolat (ESP)	3:34.29
7.	Rui Silva (POR)	3:35.74
8.	Abdelkader Hachlaf (MAR)	3:36.54
9.	Gert-Jan Liefers (NED)	3:36.99
10.	Paul McMullen (USA)	3:39.35
11.	Adil Kaouch (MAR)	3:48.45
12.	Mehdi Baala (FRA)	3:55.36

== Semi-final ==
- Held on Friday 10 August 2001

RANK	HEAT 1	TIME
1.	Bernard Lagat (KEN)	3:35.82
2.	Adil Kaouch (MAR)	3:36.01
3.	Rui Silva (POR)	3:36.07
4.	Mehdi Baala (FRA)	3:36.15
5.	Reyes Estévez (ESP)	3:36.46
6.	Gert-Jan Liefers (NED)	3:36.64
7.	Anthony Whiteman (GBR)	3:36.77
8.	Hudson de Souza (BRA)	3:37.13
9.	Peter Philipp (SUI)	3:39.66
10.	Mohamed Khaldi (ALG)	3:40.38
11.	Graham Hood (CAN)	3:40.52
12.	Youssef Baba (MAR)	3:44.90

RANK	HEAT 2	TIME
1.	Hicham El Guerrouj (MAR)	3:39.54
2.	José Antonio Redolat (ESP)	3:39.75
3.	Abdelkader Hachlaf (MAR)	3:40.16
4.	William Chirchir (KEN)	3:40.23
5.	Driss Maazouzi (FRA)	3:40.26
6.	Paul McMullen (USA)	3:40.57
7.	Laban Rotich (KEN)	3:41.09
8.	Daniel Zegeye (ETH)	3:42.15
9.	Kevin Sullivan (CAN)	3:42.30
10.	John Mayock (GBR)	3:42.63
11.	Craig Mottram (AUS)	3:43.21
12.	Saïd Chébili (FRA)	3:43.58

== Heats ==
Held on Thursday 9 August 2001

RANK	HEAT 1	TIME
1.	Hicham El Guerrouj (MAR)	3:36.97
2.	Mehdi Baala (FRA)	3:38.18
3.	Laban Rotich (KEN)	3:38.37
4.	Daniel Zegeye (ETH)	3:38.48
5.	Paul McMullen (USA)	3:38.48
6.	Adil Kaouch (MAR)	3:38.49
7.	Graham Hood (CAN)	3:38.99
8.	John Mayock (GBR)	3:39.24
9.	Alexis Sharangabo (RWA)	3:42.72
10.	James Nolan (IRL)	3:42.84
11.	José Luis Ebatela Nvó (GEQ)	4:08.01
12.	Benson Korimara (KIR)	4:51.36
—	Andrés Manuel Díaz (ESP)	DNF

RANK	HEAT 2	TIME
1.	José Antonio Redolat (ESP)	3:36.24
2.	Bernard Lagat (KEN)	3:36.49
3.	Abdelkader Hachlaf (MAR)	3:36.62
4.	Mohamed Khaldi (ALG)	3:36.92
5.	Gert-Jan Liefers (NED)	3:37.37
6.	Anthony Whiteman (GBR)	3:37.75
7.	Saïd Chébili (FRA)	3:37.99
8.	Hudson de Souza (BRA)	3:38.03
9.	Peter Philipp (SUI)	3:39.20
10.	Luís Feiteira (POR)	3:41.63
11.	Gabriel Jennings (USA)	3:46.07
12.	Christian Thielen (LUX)	3:54.20
13.	Pedro Ventura Jiménez (HON)	4:22.09
—	Ntoka Kapinga (CGO)	DNS

RANK	HEAT 3	TIME
1.	Reyes Estévez (ESP)	3:38.27
2.	Driss Maazouzi (FRA)	3:38.44
3.	William Chirchir (KEN)	3:38.69
4.	Youssef Baba (MAR)	3:38.72
5.	Rui Silva (POR)	3:38.74
6.	Kevin Sullivan (CAN)	3:38.76
7.	Craig Mottram (AUS)	3:39.10
8.	Julius Achon (UGA)	3:39.57
9.	Wolfram Müller (GER)	3:39.95
10.	Andrew Griffin (GBR)	3:40.44
11.	Seneca Lassiter (USA)	3:44.50
12.	Víctor Martínez (AND)	3:52.29
—	Amadou Diallo (GUI)	DNS
