= 1998 European Athletics Championships – Men's 1500 metres =

Men's 1500 metres at the European Athletics Championships

The men's 1500 metres at the 1998 European Athletics Championships was held at the Népstadion on 18 and 20 August.

== Medalists ==
Gold	Reyes Estévez; Spain
Silver	Rui Silva; Portugal
Bronze	Fermín Cacho; Spain

== Results ==
KEY:	q	Fastest non-qualifiers	Q	Qualified	NR	National record	PB	Personal best	SB	Seasonal best

=== Round 1 ===
Qualification: First 4 in each heat (Q) and the next 4 fastest (q) advance to the Final.

Rank	Heat	Name	Nationality	Time	Notes
1	2	Fermín Cacho	Spain	3:38.52	Q
2	2	Andrés Díaz	Spain	3:38.65	Q
3	2	Matthew Yates	Great Britain	3:38.97	Q
4	2	Branko Zorko	Croatia	3:39.31	Q
5	2	Vyacheslav Shabunin	Russia	3:39.45	q
6	2	Rüdiger Stenzel	Germany	3:39.57	q
7	2	Niall Bruton	Ireland	3:39.58	q
8	2	Abdelkader Chékhémani	France	3:39.73	q
9	1	Reyes Estévez	Spain	3:41.53	Q
10	1	John Mayock	Great Britain	3:41.69	Q
11	1	Anthony Whiteman	Great Britain	3:41.71	Q
12	1	Rui Silva	Portugal	3:41.87	Q
13	1	Gert-Jan Liefers	Netherlands	3:42.21	
14	1	Andrey Zadorozhniy	Russia	3:42.71	
15	1	Peter Philipp	Switzerland	3:43.50	
16	1	Panagiotis Stroubakos	Greece	3:44.01	
17	2	Luís Feiteira	Portugal	3:45.00	
18	1	Nadir Bosch	France	3:46.00	
19	1	Dirk Heinze	Germany	3:46.13	
20	1	Darko Radomirović	Yugoslavia	3:46.86	
21	2	Alexandru Vasile	Romania	3:46.95	
22	2	Balázs Tölgyesi	Hungary	3:47.01	
23	1	Werner Edler-Muhr	Austria	3:47.62	
	2	Giuseppe D'Urso	Italy	DNF	

=== Final ===
Rank	Name	Nationality	Time	Notes
1st place, gold medalist(s)	Reyes Estévez	Spain	3:41.31	
2nd place, silver medalist(s)	Rui Silva	Portugal	3:41.84	
3rd place, bronze medalist(s)	Fermín Cacho	Spain	3:42.13	
4	Anthony Whiteman	Great Britain	3:42.27	
5	John Mayock	Great Britain	3:42.58	
6	Matthew Yates	Great Britain	3:42.63	
7	Rüdiger Stenzel	Germany	3:42.75	
8	Abdelkader Chékhémani	France	3:42.92	
9	Vyacheslav Shabunin	Russia	3:42.98	
10	Branko Zorko	Croatia	3:43.95	
11	Andrés Díaz	Spain	3:46.99	
12	Niall Bruton	Ireland	3:47.48	
