= 2000 European Athletics Indoor Championships – Men's 1500 metres =

The men's 1500 metres event at the 2000 European Athletics Indoor Championships was held on February 25–26.

== Medalists ==
Gold	Silver	Bronze
José Antonio Redolat; Spain	James Nolan; Ireland	Mehdi Baala; France

== Results ==
=== Heats ===
First 3 of each heat (Q) and the next 3 fastest (q) qualified for the final.

Rank	Heat	Name	Nationality	Time	Notes
1	1	José Antonio Redolat	Spain	3:41.53	Q
2	2	Mehdi Baala	France	3:41.76	Q
3	2	Vyacheslav Shabunin	Russia	3:41.84	Q
4	2	James Nolan	Ireland	3:41.90	Q
5	2	Marko Koers	Netherlands	3:42.13	q, PB
6	1	Luís Feiteira	Portugal	3:42.43	Q
7	1	Balázs Tölgyesi	Hungary	3:42.66	Q
8	2	Peter Philipp	Switzerland	3:42.81	q
9	1	Juan Carlos Higuero	Spain	3:42.88	q
10	1	Branko Zorko	Croatia	3:42.92	
11	1	Gareth Turnbull	Ireland	3:42.97	PB
12	1	Lorenzo Lazzari	Italy	3:43.06	
13	2	Antonio Travassos	Portugal	3:45.45	
14	1	Patrick Grammens	Belgium	3:45.96	PB
15	1	Piotr Rostkowski	Poland	3:46.45	
16	2	Pedro Esteso	Spain	3:48.94	
17	2	Eddie King	Great Britain	3:49.18	

=== Final ===
Rank	Name	Nationality	Time	Notes
1st place, gold medalist(s)	José Antonio Redolat	Spain	3:40.51	
2nd place, silver medalist(s)	James Nolan	Ireland	3:41.59	
3rd place, bronze medalist(s)	Mehdi Baala	France	3:42.27	
4	Marko Koers	Netherlands	3:42.46	
5	Vyacheslav Shabunin	Russia	3:43.44	
6	Juan Carlos Higuero	Spain	3:44.07	
7	Luís Feiteira	Portugal	3:44.53	
8	Peter Philipp	Switzerland	3:44.55	
9	Balázs Tölgyesi	Hungary	3:46.74	
