= Masters M55 3000 metres world record progression =

This is the progression of world record improvements of the 3000 metres M55 division of Masters athletics. Records must be set in properly conducted, official competitions under the standing IAAF rules unless modified by World Masters Athletics. The M55 division consists of male athletes who have reached the age of 55 but have not yet reached the age of 60, so exactly from their 55th birthday to the day before their 60th birthday.

Key

Incomplete information Pending better indoor records

Hand	Auto	Athlete	Nationality	Birthdate	Age	Location	Date	Ref
	8:55.93	Peter van der Velden	Netherlands	29 November 1968	55 years, 241 days	Leuven	27 July 2024	
	8:47.71i	Shane Healy	Ireland	5 October 1968	55 years, 93 days	Abbotstown	6 January 2024	
	8:56.80	Keith Bateman	Australia	29 June 1955	55 years, 137 days	Sydney	13 November 2010	
	8:57.28	Ron Robertson	New Zealand	3 June 1941	55 years, 250 days	Wanganui	8 February 1997	
9:01.8		Gunther Hesselmann	Germany	3 August 1925	55 years, 346 days	Dülmen	15 July 1981	
