= 1994 European Athletics Championships – Men's 1500 metres =

Men's 1500 metres at the European Athletics Championships

The men's 1500 metres event at the 1994 European Athletics Championships was held in Helsinki, Finland, at Helsinki Olympic Stadium on 7 and 9 August 1994.

== Medalists ==
Gold	Fermín Cacho; Spain
Silver	Isaac Viciosa; Spain
Bronze	Branko Zorko; Croatia

== Results ==
=== Final ===
9 August

Rank	Name	Nationality	Time	Notes
1st place, gold medalist(s)	Fermín Cacho	Spain	3:35.27	
2nd place, silver medalist(s)	Isaac Viciosa	Spain	3:36.01	
3rd place, bronze medalist(s)	Branko Zorko	Croatia	3:36.88	
4	Éric Dubus	France	3:37.44	
5	Andrey Bulkovskiy	Ukraine	3:37.81	
6	Manuel Pancorbo	Spain	3:38.16	
7	Rüdiger Stenzel	Germany	3:38.36	
8	Kader Chékhémani	France	3:38.42	
9	Gennaro Di Napoli	Italy	3:39.96	
10	Niall Bruton	Ireland	3:41.22	
11	Gary Lough	United Kingdom	3:43.09	
12	David Strang	United Kingdom	3:50.27	

=== Heats ===
7 August

==== Heat 1 ====
Rank	Name	Nationality	Time	Notes
1	Fermín Cacho	Spain	3:37.18	Q
2	Niall Bruton	Ireland	3:37.54	Q
3	Kader Chékhémani	France	3:37.75	Q
4	Gary Lough	United Kingdom	3:37.83	Q
5	Rüdiger Stenzel	Germany	3:37.84	q
6	Éric Dubus	France	3:38.02	q
7	Gennaro Di Napoli	Italy	3:38.33	q
8	Branko Zorko	Croatia	3:39.84	q
9	Mogens Guldberg	Denmark	3:40.89	
10	Christophe Impens	Belgium	3:41.25	
11	Werner Edler-Muhr	Austria	3:43.08	
12	Sami Alanen	Finland	3:43.58	
13	Zeki Öztürk	Turkey	3:46.39	

==== Heat 2 ====
Rank	Name	Nationality	Time	Notes
1	Isaac Viciosa	Spain	3:39.72	Q
2	David Strang	United Kingdom	3:39.96	Q
3	Andrey Bulkovskiy	Ukraine	3:40.05	Q
4	Manuel Pancorbo	Spain	3:40.06	Q
5	Kevin McKay	United Kingdom	3:40.19	
6	Jens-Peter Herold	Germany	3:40.24	
7	Samir Benfarès	France	3:40.43	
8	Marcus O'Sullivan	Ireland	3:40.58	
9	Azat Rakipov	Belarus	3:41.41	
10	Davide Tirelli	Italy	3:42.03	
11	Vyacheslav Shabunin	Russia	3:42.91	
12	Milan Drahoňovský	Czech Republic	3:43.66	

== Participation ==
According to an unofficial count, 25 athletes from 16 countries participated in the event.

- Austria (1)
- Belarus (1)
- Belgium (1)
- Croatia (1)
- Czech Republic (1)
- Denmark (1)
- Finland (1)
- France (3)
- Germany (2)
- Ireland (2)
- Italy (2)
- Russia (1)
- Spain (3)
- Turkey (1)
- Ukraine (1)
- United Kingdom (3)
