= Shabunin =

Shabunin is a surname. Notable people with the surname include:

- Ivan Shabunin (1935–2006), Russian politician
- Vyacheslav Shabunin (born 1969), Russian middle-distance runner
