= Masters M35 1500 metres world record progression =

This is the progression of world record improvements of the 1500 metres M35 division of Masters athletics.

Key

Incomplete information Pending

| Hand | Auto | Athlete | Nationality | Birthdate | Location | Date |
|---|---|---|---|---|---|---|
| | 3:32.45 | William Tanui | KEN | 22.02.1964 | Athens | 16.06.1999 |
| | 3:32.51 | Bernard Lagat | USA | 12.12.1974 | Monaco | 22.07.2010 |
| | 3:32.81 | Laban Rotich | KEN | 20.01.1969 | Iráklion | 04.07.2004 |
| | 3:33.91 | Mike Boit | KEN | 06.01.1949 | Zürich | 21.08.1985 |
| 3:41.4 | | Carlos Lopes | POR | 18.02.1947 | Lisboa | 24.07.1982 |
| | 3:42.41 | Gerard Vervoordt | FRA | 06.05.1936 | Paris | 24.06.1973 |
| 3:46.2 | | Roger Verheuen | BEL | 02.02.1927 | Audenarde | 12.08.1962 |
| 3:47.8 | | Viktor Valiavko | URS | 1926 | Dnepropetrovsk | 02.08.1962 |
