= Djibouti at the 1996 Summer Olympics =

- IOC code: DJI
- NOC: Comité National Olympique Djiboutien

in Atlanta
- Competitors: 5 in 2 sports
- Flag bearer: Hussein Ahmed Salah
- Medals: Gold 0 Silver 0 Bronze 0 Total 0

Summer Olympics appearances (overview)
- 1984; 1988; 1992; 1996; 2000; 2004; 2008; 2012; 2016; 2020; 2024

Djibouti took part in the 1996 Summer Olympics, which were held in Atlanta, United States from 19 July to 4 August. The country's participation marked its fourth appearance in the Summer Olympics since its debut at the 1984 Summer Games in Los Angeles, United States. The delegation from Djibouti included five athletes, three in athletics and two in sailing. The three athletes for athletics were Ali Ibrahim, Omar Moussa, and Hussein Ahmed Salah while Robleh Ali Adou and Mohamed Youssef represented the country for sailing.

== Competitors ==
The following is the list of number of competitors in the Games.

| Sport | Men | Women | Total |
|---|---|---|---|
| Athletics | 3 | 0 | 3 |
| Sailing | 2 | 0 | 2 |
| Total | 5 | 0 | 5 |

== Background ==
Djibouti participated in four Summer Olympics between its debut at the 1984 Games in Los Angeles, United States and the 1996 Summer Olympics in Atlanta, United States. Djibouti made their Olympic debut in 1984, sending three athletes. Djibouti's one and only medal prior to these games was a bronze awarded to Hussein Ahmed Salah in the men's marathon at the 1988 Summer Olympics in Seoul, South Korea. The highest number of Djibouti competing at a Games was eight at the 1992 Summer Olympics in Barcelona, Spain.

== Athletics ==
Djibouti was represented by three male athletes at the 1996 Summer Olympics in athletics: Ali Ibrahim, Omar Moussa, and Hussein Ahmed Salah. This was Ibrahim's first appearance, Moussa's second appearance, and Ahmed Salah's fourth appearance at the Olympics. Moussa and Ahmed Salah had previously competed in the men's marathon of the 1988 Summer Olympics, where Ahmed Salah won a bronze medal, which is currently Djibouti's only Olympic medal.

Ali Ibrahim competed in the men's 1500 meters, where he finished tenth in his group but forty-sixth overall, failing to advance to the next round. The medals in the event went to athletes from Algeria, Spain, and Kenya.

Both Omar Moussa and Hussein Ahmed Salah competed in the men's marathon. Moussa was one of thirteen athletes who did not finish the marathon; Ahmed Salah finished in two hours, twenty minutes, and thirty three seconds, placing 42nd out of the 111 athletes who finished the marathon. The medals in the event went to athletes from South Africa, South Korea, and Kenya.

=== Men ===
Track and road events

| Athletes | Events | Heat Round 1 | | Heat Round 2 | | Semifinal | | Final | |
| Athletes | Events | Time | Rank | Time | Rank | Time | Rank | Time | Rank |
|---|---|---|---|---|---|---|---|---|---|
| Ali Ibrahim | 1500 metres | 3:46.62 | 46 | N/A | | Did not advance | | | |
| Omar Moussa | Marathon | N/A | | | | | | Did not finish | |
| Hussein Ahmed Salah | Marathon | N/A | | | | | | 2:20:33 | 42 |

== Sailing ==
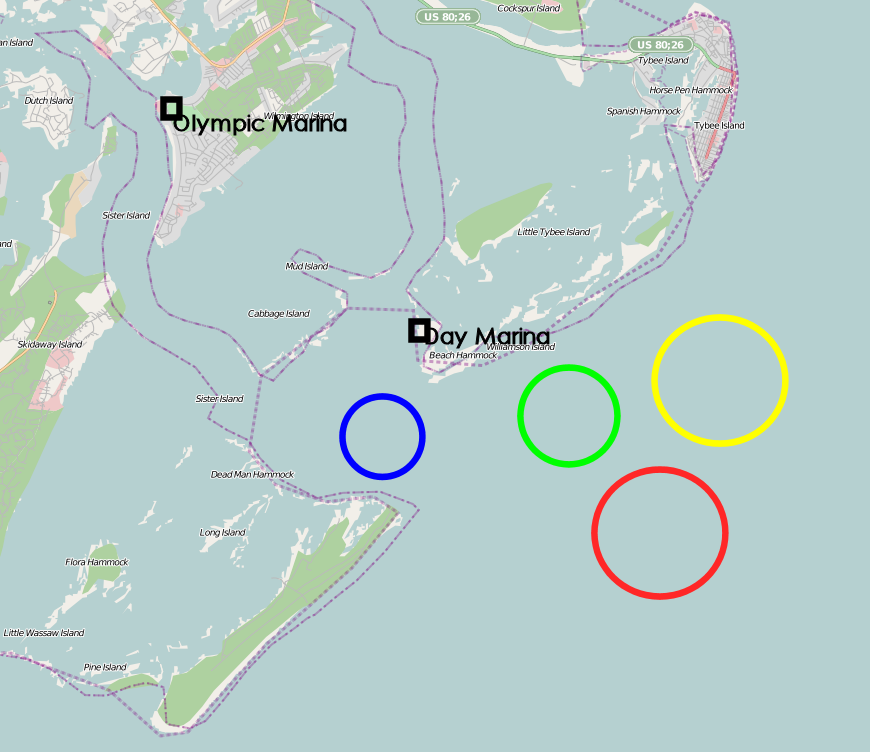
A map of Wassaw Sound, the sailing venue where Ali Adou and Youssef competed

Djibouti was represented by two male athletes at the 1996 Summer Olympics in sailing: Robleh Ali Adou and Mohamed Youssef. This was Mohamed Youssef's Olympic debut and Ali Adou's third Olympic appearance.

Robleh Ali Adou competed in the Mistral One Design event, and finished last in the standings out of forty-six athletes. He scored a total of 406 points finishing with a net point value of 312. The medals in the event went to athletes from Greece, Argentina, and Israel.

Mohammed Youssef competed in the Laser Class for the mixed one person dingy event. Youssef finished in the standings at 55th out of 56 athletes competing, scoring a total of 583 points with a final net point value of 469. The medals for the event went to athletes from Brazil, Great Britain, and Norway.

=== Men ===
| Athlete | Event | Race | | | | | | | | | | | Score | Rank |
| Athlete | Event | 1 | 2 | 3 | 4 | 5 | 6 | 7 | 8 | 9 | 10 | 11 | Score | Rank |
|---|---|---|---|---|---|---|---|---|---|---|---|---|---|---|
| Robleh Ali Adou | Mistral | (47) | 45 | 45 | 39 | (47) | 47 | 47 | 44 | 45 | CAN | CAN | 312 | 46 |

=== Mixed ===
| Athlete | Event | Race | | | | | | | | | | | Score | Rank |
| Athlete | Event | 1 | 2 | 3 | 4 | 5 | 6 | 7 | 8 | 9 | 10 | 11 | Score | Rank |
|---|---|---|---|---|---|---|---|---|---|---|---|---|---|---|
| Mohamed Youssef | Laser | 53 | 48 | 56 | (57) | (57) | 57 | 51 | 50 | 56 | 53 | 45 | 469 | 55 |
