= Liefers =

Liefers is a surname. Notable people with the surname include:

- Gert-Jan Liefers (born 1978), Dutch middle-distance runner
- Jan Josef Liefers (born 1964), German actor, producer, director, and musician
