= Stephen Kipkorir =

Kenyan middle-distance runner (1970-2008)

Stephen Arusei Kipkorir
Personal information
- Nationality: Kenyan
- Born: 24 October 1970
- Died: 8 February 2008 (aged 37)

Sport
- Sport: Running
Medal record
Representing Kenya
Men's athletics
Bronze medal – third place	1996 Atlanta	1500 metres

Stephen Arusei Kipkorir (24 October 1970 – 8 February 2008) was a Kenyan middle distance runner, best known for winning a bronze medal in 1500 metres at the 1996 Summer Olympics.

His running career began on 23 March 1996, when he finished fourteenth at the World Cross Championships held in Stellenbosch, South Africa. Dr. Gabriele Rosa noticed him and convinced him to run the 1500 metres. Five months later he won the Olympic bronze medal.

His personal best time in the 1500 metres was 3:31.87 minutes, achieved in July 1996 in Lausanne. His last international competition took place in 2001.

After his brief athletic career he became a professional soldier. He also owned a farm near Sugoi, an area close to Eldoret in which were living other athletes: Moses Tanui, Joyce Chepchumba and her husband Aron, and David Kiptoo.

Kipkorir was killed in a military vehicle crash on the road between Nakuru and Eldoret.
