= Michael Gottschalk =

German middle-distance runner

Personal information
- Nationality: German
- Born: 22 June 1972 (age 54) Riesa, East Germany
- Height: 182 cm (6 ft 0 in)
- Weight: 71 kg (157 lb)

Sport
- Country: Germany
- Sport: Middle-distance running

Michael Gottschalk (born 22 June 1972) is a German Olympic middle-distance runner. He represented his country in the men's 1500 meters at the 1996 Summer Olympics. His time was a 3:56.46.
