= Edgar de Oliveira =

Brazilian middle-distance runner

Personal information
- Born: 11 November 1967 (age 58) Ibititá, Bahia, Brazil

Sport
- Sport: Track and field

Edgar Martins de Oliveira (born 11 November 1967) is a retired Brazilian middle-distance runner who specialised in the 1500 metres. He represented his country at the 1992 Summer Olympics and the 1996 Summer Olympics as well as three consecutive World Championships, starting in 1991.

== Competition record ==
Year	Competition	Venue	Position	Event	Notes
Representing Brazil
1989	South American Championships	Medellín, Colombia	3rd	800 m	1:49.51
1989	South American Championships	Medellín, Colombia	1st	1500 m	3:47.7
1989	World Cup	Barcelona, Spain	8th	1500 m	3:41.59
1990	Ibero-American Championships	Manaus, Brazil	4th	800m	1:47.93
1990	Ibero-American Championships	Manaus, Brazil	5th	1500m	3:44.17
1991	South American Championships	Manaus, Brazil	1st	1500 m	3:42.41
1991	World Championships	Tokyo, Japan	30th (h)	1500 m	3:45.59
1992	Ibero-American Championships	Seville, Spain	3rd	800 m	1:48.38
1992	Ibero-American Championships	Seville, Spain	3rd	1500 m	3:43.26
1992	World Cup	Havana, Cuba	6th	1500 m	3:45.97
1993	World Indoor Championships	Toronto, Canada	11th (h)	1500 m	3:44.32
1993	World Championships	Stuttgart, Germany	23rd (h)	1500 m	3:41.88
1995	Pan American Games	Mar del Plata, Argentina	5th	1500 m	3:43.98
1995	South American Championships	Manaus, Brazil	1st	1500 m	3:38.81
1995	World Championships	Gothenburg, Sweden	17th (h)	1500 m	3:41.74
1996	Ibero-American Championships	Medellín, Colombia	1st	1500 m	3:43.00
1996	Olympic Games	Atlanta, United States	25th (h)	1500 m	3:40.70
1997	World Indoor Championships	Paris, France	21st (h)	1500 m	3:51.41
1997	South American Championships	Mar del Plata, Argentina	1st	1500 m	3:47.76
1997	South American Championships	Mar del Plata, Argentina	7th	5000 m	14:25.69
2001	South American Championships	Manaus, Brazil	2nd	1500 m	3:43.56

== Personal bests ==
Outdoor Track

- 800 metres - 1:46.55 (Americana/SP 1996)
- 1000 metres - 2:18.80 [Hamburgo 1997]
- 1500 metres – 3:34.80 (Roma 1991)
- One mile – 3:53.30 (Eugene 1998)
- 3000 metres – 7:52.51 (San Diego 1995)
- 5000 metres – 13:38.52 (Los Angeles 1995)

Road Race

- 10km - 29:03 (Chula Vista 1998)

Indoor Track

- 1500 metres – 3:44.32 (Toronto 1993)
