= Graham Hood =

Canadian middle-distance runner

Personal information
- Born: April 2, 1972 (age 54) Winnipeg, Manitoba, Canada
- Height: 6 ft 1 in (1.85 m)
- Weight: 154 lb (70 kg)

Sport
- Sport: Track
- Event: 1500 metres
- College team: Arkansas

Achievements and titles
- Personal bests: 800m: 1:45.70; 1000m: 2:16.88; 1500m: 3:33.94; Mile: 3:51.55
Medal record
Men's Athletics
Representing Canada
Pan American Junior Championships
Silver medal – second place	1989 Santa Fe	800m
Gold medal – first place	1991 Kingston	1500m
Bronze medal – third place	1991 Kingston	800m
Pan American Games
Gold medal – first place	1999 Winnipeg	1.500 metres

Graham Hood (born April 2, 1972) is a retired track and field athlete from Canada, who competed in the middle distance events.

== Early life ==
Hood was born in Winnipeg, Manitoba to parents Colin and Brenda, but grew up in Burlington, Ontario. His father served as the executive director of the Ontario Federation of School Athletic Associations (OFSAA) and the Colin Hood OFSAA School Sport Award is named in his honour. He has two sisters.

Hood attended Nelson High School where he was a four-time OFSAA champion in the 800m and 1500m. Hood was a member of the Burlington Track and Field Club and played a variety of sports during his high school years, including soccer, basketball, cross country skiing, and track and field.

== Collegiate ==
Hood ran collegiately for the college track powerhouse Arkansas Razorbacks where he helped the team capture NCAA titles in cross country and both indoor and outdoor track and field. Hood was named the Top Relay Runner among college men at the 1994 Penn Relays.

Hood was inducted into the University of Arkansas Hall of Honour in 2014.

== Running career ==
Hood represented his native country at two consecutive Summer Olympics, starting in 1992. He won the gold medal in the men's 1.500 metres race at the 1999 Pan American Games in his native Winnipeg.

Hood is the only Canadian to have won the Millrose Games' Wanamaker Mile, having won the 1995 edition of the event with a time of 3:57.08.

Hood placed 679th overall at the 2017 Ironman World Championship, October 14 in Kailua-Kona, Hawai'i, finishing with a time of 10:29:28.

== Personal life ==
Hood is married to fellow Canadian Olympian Malindi Elmore and has two children.

== Competition record ==
Year	Competition	Venue	Position	Event	Notes
Representing Canada
1989	Pan American Junior Championships	Santa Fe, Argentina	2nd	800 m	1:51.98
1990	World Junior Championships	Plovdiv, Bulgaria	15th	1500 m	3:50.72
1991	Pan American Junior Championships	Kingston, Jamaica	3rd	800 m	1:49.79
1991	Pan American Junior Championships	Kingston, Jamaica	1st	1500 m	3:52.48
1992	Olympic Games	Barcelona, Spain	9th	1500 m	3:42.55
1994	Commonwealth Games	Victoria, British Columbia, Canada	10th	1500 m	3:41.23
1996	Olympic Games	Atlanta, United States	–	1500 m	DNF
1997	World Indoor Championships	Paris, France	11th	1500 m	3:45.03
1997	World Championships	Athens, Greece	7th	1500 m	3:37.55
1999	Pan American Games	Winnipeg, Manitoba, Canada	1st	1500 m	3:41.20
1999	World Championships	Seville, Spain	10th	1500 m	3:35.35
2001	World Championships	Edmonton, Alberta, Canada	16th (sf)	1500 m	3:40.52
2002	Commonwealth Games	Manchester, United Kingdom	5th	1500 m	3:38.08
2003	World Indoor Championships	Birmingham, United Kingdom	25th (h)	1500 m	3:50.86
