= Matthew Yates =

English athlete (born 1969)

Matt Yates
Personal information
- Nationality: British (English)
- Born: 4 February 1969 (age 57) Rochford, Essex

Sport
- Sport: Athletics
- Event: Middle-distance
- Club: Newham and Essex Beagles A.C.
Medal record
Athletics
Representing England
Commonwealth Games
Bronze medal – third place	1990 Auckland	800m

Matthew Stewart Yates (born 4 February 1969) is a retired English athlete who specialised in the middle-distance events.

== Biography ==
Yates won the gold medal in the 1500 metres at the 1992 European Indoor Championships. He represented England and won a bronze medal in the 800 metres event, at the 1990 Commonwealth Games in Auckland, New Zealand.

Yates became the British 1500 metres champion after winning the British AAA Championships title at the 1991 AAA Championships and the 1993 AAA Championships.

== Competition record ==
Year	Competition	Venue	Position	Event	Notes
Representing Great Britain and England
1990	Commonwealth Games	Auckland, New Zealand	3rd	800m	1:46.62
1990	European Championships	Split, Yugoslavia	8th	800 m	1:48.42
1991	World Championships	Tokyo, Japan	10th	1500 m	3:38.71
1992	European Indoor Championships	Genoa, Italy	1st	1500 m	3:42.32
1992	Olympic Games	Barcelona, Spain	21st (sf)	1500 m	3:40.53
1993	World Championships	Stuttgart, Germany	6th	1500 m	3:37.61
1997	World Championships	Athens, Greece	22nd (h)	1500 m	3:38.34
1998	European Championships	Budapest, Hungary	6th	1500 m	3:42.63

== Personal bests ==
Outdoor

- 800 metres – 1:45.05 (Koblenz 1992)
- 1000 metres – 2:16.34 (Edinburgh 1990)
- 1500 metres – 3:35.04 (London 1995)
- One mile – 3:52.75 (Oslo 1993)

Indoor

- 800 metres – 1:50.19 (Birmingham 1997)
- 1000 metres – 2:17.86 (Birmingham 1992)
- 1500 metres – 3:44.01 (Ghent 1996)
- One mile – 3:54.78 (Birmingham 1992)
- 3000 metres – 7:50.82 (Seville 1993)
