= Christophe Impens =

Belgian middle-distance runner

Personal information
- Born: 9 December 1969 (age 56) Ghent, Belgium
- Height: 1.84 m (6 ft 0 in)
- Weight: 70 kg (154 lb)

Sport
- Sport: Track and field
- Events: 1500 metres, 3000 metres
- Club: BTC
- Coached by: Jef Van Driessche, Robert Bracke

Christophe Impens (born 9 December 1969 in Ghent) is a retired Belgian athlete who competed in middle-distance events. He represented his country at the 1996 Summer Olympics, as well as two outdoor and two indoor World Championships. His biggest success is the silver medal in the 3000 metres at the 1996 European Indoor Championships.

== Competition record ==
Year	Competition	Venue	Position	Event	Notes
Representing Belgium
1987	European Junior Championships	Birmingham, United Kingdom	15th (h)	1500 m	3:54.47
1988	World Junior Championships	Sudbury, Canada	8th	1500 m	3:51.73
1990	European Championships	Split, Yugoslavia	18th (h)	1500 m	3:41.64
1992	European Indoor Championships	Genoa, Italy	13th (h)	1500 m	3:45.24
1993	World Indoor Championships	Toronto, Canada	17th (h)	3000 m	7:56.07
1993	World Championships	Stuttgart, Germany	20th (sf)	1500 m	3:42.85
1994	European Indoor Championships	Paris, France	13th (h)	3000 m	8:00.59
1994	European Championships	Helsinki, Finland	18th (h)	1500 m	3:41.25
1995	World Championships	Gothenburg, Sweden	21st (sf)	1500 m	3:44.86
1996	European Indoor Championships	Stockholm, Sweden	2nd	3000 m	7:50.19
1996	Olympic Games	Atlanta, United States	18th (sf)	1500 m	3:37.64
1997	World Indoor Championships	Paris, France	9th	1500 m	3:42.89

== Personal bests ==
Outdoor

- 1500 metres – 3:34.13 (Brussels 1996) NR
- One Mile – 3:55.75 (Brussels 1993)

Indoor

- 1500 metres – 3:38.01 (Ghent 1997)
- One Mile – 3:54.13 (Ghent 1997) NR
- 3000 metres – 7:49.43 (Ghent 1996)
