= Robert Kiplagat Andersen =

Kenyan-born middle-distance runner (born 1972)

Personal information
- Born: Robert Kiplagat Kiptanui; 12 December 1972 (age 53) Kenya

Sport
- Sport: Athletics
- Event: 1500 metres
- Club: Københavns IF; Sparta Atletik

Robert Kiplagat Andersen (also known as Robert K. Andersen; born 12 December 1972) is a retired Kenyan-born middle-distance runner who ran internationally for Denmark. He competed in the 1500 metres at the 1995 World Championships in Athletics, reaching the semifinals, and the 1997 World Championships in Athletics, reaching the final.

== International competitions ==
Year	Competition	Venue	Position	Event	Notes
Representing Denmark
1995	1995 World Championships in Athletics	Gothenburg, Sweden	22nd (sf)	1500 m	3:46.41
1997	World Indoor Championships	Paris, France	15th (h)	3000 m	7:54.72
1997	World Championships	Athens, Greece	8th	1500 m	3:37.66

== Personal bests ==
Outdoor

- 800 metres – 1:46.47 (Malmö 1997)
- 1000 metres – 2:19.78 (Florø 1997)
- 1500 metres – 3:31.17 (Zürich 1997)
- One mile – 3:50.79 (Berlin 1997)
- 3000 metres – 8:09.98 (Malmö 2004)
- 5000 metres – 13:51.22 (Heusden-Zolder 2004)

Indoor

- 800 metres – 1:53.36 (Malmö 2001)
- 1000 metres – 2:24.22 (Erfurt 1997)
- 1500 metres – 3:39.78 (Stuttgart 1998)
- 3000 metres – 7:54.72 (Paris 1997)
