= Thomas Ebner (athlete) =

Austrian middle-distance runner

Personal information
- Nationality: Austrian
- Born: 17 November 1971 (age 54) Ehenbichl, Austria

Sport
- Sport: Middle-distance running
- Event: 1500 metres

Thomas Ebner (born 17 November 1971) is an Austrian middle-distance runner. He competed in the men's 1500 metres at the 1996 Summer Olympics.
