= Steve Agar =

Dominican athletics competitor

Personal information
- Born: June 6, 1968 (age 58) Loubiere, Saint George, Dominica
- Height: 1.82 m (6 ft 0 in)
- Weight: 72 kg (159 lb)

Sport
- Sport: Athletics
- Events: 800 m, 1500 m

Stephen Kirwan "Steve" Agar (born 6 June 1968 in Saint George) is a retired track and field athlete who competed for Dominica and later Canada. At the 1996 Summer Olympic Games in the men's 1500 metres he finished eighth in his heat, failing to advance. In 1998 he got Canadian nationality. He is the brother of swimmer Francilla Agar.

== Competition record ==
Year	Competition	Venue	Position	Event	Notes
Representing Dominica
1985	CARIFTA Games (U20)	Bridgetown, Barbados	2nd	5000 m	15:42.94
1993	World Indoor Championships	Toronto, Canada	17th (h)	3000 m	7:56.44
1994	Jeux de la Francophonie	Bondoufle, France	25th (h)	1500 m	3:54.17^{1}
1994	Jeux de la Francophonie	Bondoufle, France	–	5000 m	DNF
1994	Commonwealth Games	Victoria, Canada	5th (h)	1500 m	3:48.21
1995	Pan American Games	Mar del Plata, Argentina	10th	5000 m	14:08.54
1996	Olympic Games	Atlanta, United States	37th (h)	1500 m	3:43.02
1997	World Indoor Championships	Paris, France	18th (h)	1500 m	3:45.33
Representing Canada
1998	World Cup	Johannesburg, South Africa	8th	1500 m	3:57.36^{2}
1998	Commonwealth Games	Kuala Lumpur, Malaysia	25th (h)	800 m	1:51.07
1998	Commonwealth Games	Kuala Lumpur, Malaysia	7th	1500 m	3:44.17

^{1}Did not finish in the final
^{2}Representing the Americas

== Personal bests ==
Outdoor

- 800 metres – 1:51.07 (Kuala Lumpur 1998)
- 1500 metres – 3:36.36 (Stuttgart 1998)
- One mile – 3:57.77 (Eugene 1997)
- 2000 metres – 5:03.57 (Prague 1997)
- 3000 metres – 7:48.33 (Rovereto 1998)
- 5000 metres – 13:35.86 (Walnut 1998)
- 10,000 metres – 31:53.3 (St George's 1989)
- 10 kilometres – 29:36 (Ottawa 1995)

Indoor

- 1500 metres – 3:42.34 (Sindelfingen 1997)
- One mile – 4:04.31 (Montreal 1997)
- 3000 metres – 7:56.44 (Toronto 1993)
