= Ali Hakimi =

Tunisian Swiss middle distance runner (born 1976)

Ali Hakimi (born 24 April 1976) is a Tunisian Swiss middle distance runner who specializes in the 1500 metres. Born in Tunisia, he formerly represented that country.

== Career ==
He was born in Tunis, and represented the club Club Africain. As a junior (below 20 years) he won the silver medal at the 1994 African Junior Championships, and competed in two events at the 1992 World Junior Championships without reaching the final.

His major achievements as a senior were an eighth place at the 1996 Olympic Games, a sixth place at the 1997 World Indoor Championships, a fifth place at the 1997 World Championships and a sixth place at the 1999 World Indoor Championships. In 1999 he won two gold medals at the Pan Arab Games. He also competed at the 1995 World Indoor Championships, the 1995 World Championships and the 1999 World Championships without reaching the final round. Despite his international success he is only Tunisian champion three times; once in 800 metres (1995) and twice in 1500 metres (1995, 2001).

His personal best 1500 metres time is 3:31.70 minutes, achieved in August 1997 in Brussels. He also has 1.46.51 minutes in the 800 metres, achieved in June 1996 in Cottbus; 2:16.71 minutes in the 1000 metres, achieved in July 1999 in Stockholm; and 3:50.57 minutes in the mile run, achieved in August 1997 in Berlin. Several of these times are Tunisian records.

== Personal life ==
Hakimi took Swiss nationality in May 2007, and was eligible to represent his new country in athletics from May 2008.

Hakimi stands at 1.76 m (5 ft 9 1/2 in) and weighed about 55 kilograms (121 lb) during his active career.
