= Brian Hyde =

American middle-distance runner

Personal information
- Born: October 13, 1972 (age 53) Kentwood, Michigan, U.S.

Sport
- Sport: Track
- Events: 1500 meters, mile
- College team: William & Mary

Achievements and titles
- Personal bests: 1500m: 3:35.84; Indoor mile: 3:56.41

Brian L. Hyde (born October 13, 1972) is an American retired middle-distance runner who specialized in the 1500 meters. He represented the United States at the 1996 Summer Olympics.

== Running career ==
=== High school ===
Hyde attended East Kentwood High School where he competed in cross country and track. His high school personal best time on a cross country 5,000 meter course was 15:41 (min:sec). He graduated in 1991.

=== Collegiate ===
Hyde was recruited by William & Mary, where he set two school records in the 1000 meters and 1500 meters. When Hyde broke W&M's record in the 1500 meters, he also had run the fastest 1500-meter race in the entire world in 1995.

=== Post-collegiate ===
Hyde represented the United States in the men's 1500 meter at the 1996 Summer Olympics, recording a time of 3:48.20. Despite not making it past the first round, Hyde continued to pursue track after his Olympic spell and ran professionally for New Balance. In 1997, Hyde recorded the fourth fastest indoor mile time of any individual from the state of Michigan, 3:56.41 (min:sec). Now he coaches a middle school track team in Virginia. He coached the track team to a regional championship. That season the track team also went undefeated. Track star Courtney Mudd ran for Coach Hyde along with Josh Fong, Zach Blaum, Ashton Shultz, Daniel Mudd, and Owen Guest.
