= Gert-Jan Liefers =

Dutch middle-distance runner

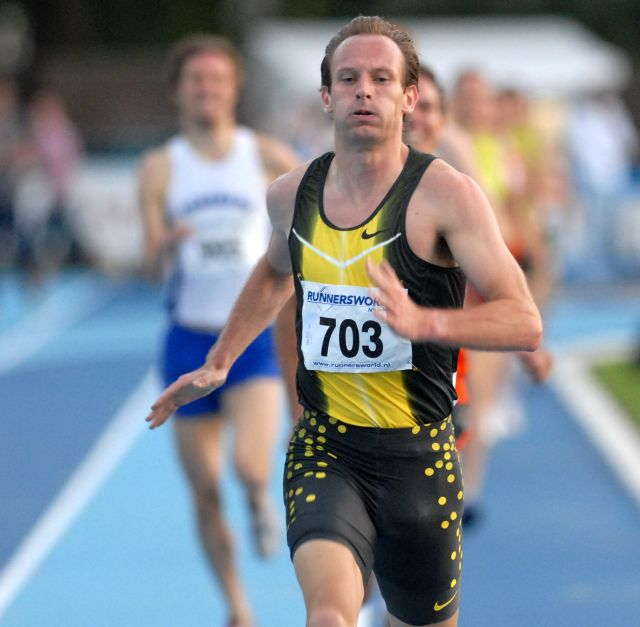

Personal information
- Full name: Gerrit Jan Liefers
- Born: 26 September 1978 (age 48) Apeldoorn, Netherlands
- Height: 1.86 m (6 ft 1 in)
- Weight: 71 kg (157 lb)

Achievements and titles
- Personal bests: 800 metres – 1:45.47 (1998); 1500 metres – 3:32.89 (2001); Mile – 3:51.39 (2003); 3000 metres – 7:37.49 (2005); 5000 metres – 13:22.26 (2005)
Medal record
Representing Netherlands
European U23 Championships
Silver medal – second place	1999 Stockholm	1500m
European Junior Championships
Gold medal – first place	1997 Ljubljana	1500m
Bronze medal – third place	1995 Nyiregyhaza	1500m

Gerrit Jan 'Gert-Jan' Liefers (born 26 September 1978) is a former Dutch middle distance runner, who came 8th in the 1500 m final at the 2004 Olympics. He was also a finalist in the same event in the 2001 and 2003 World Championships.

Liefers finished 8th in the 5000 m final at the 2006 European Athletics Championships in Gothenburg. He is the Dutch record holder at 1500 m, the mile and 3000 m.

== Competition record ==
Year	Competition	Venue	Position	Event	Notes
1995	European Junior Championships	Nyíregyháza, Hungary	3rd	1500 m	3:47.17
1996	World Junior Championships	Sydney, Australia	4th	1500 m	3:40.47
1997	European Junior Championships	Ljubljana, Slovenia	1st	1500 m	3:46.91
1997	Universiade	Catania, Italy	15th (sf)	800 m	1:49.03
1997	Universiade	Catania, Italy	6th	1500 m	3:46.09
1997	European Cross Country Championships	Oeiras, Portugal	1st	Junior race (5.4 km)	15:45
1998	European Indoor Championships	Valencia, Spain	11th (sf)	800 m	1:50.82
1998	European Championships	Budapest, Hungary	15th (h)	800 m	1:47.57
1998	European Championships	Budapest, Hungary	13th (h)	1500 m	3:42.21
1999	European U23 Championships	Gothenburg, Sweden	2nd	1500 m	3:44.60
1999	World Championships	Seville, Spain	24th (sf)	1500 m	DNF
2001	World Championships	Edmonton, Canada	9th	1500 m	3:36.99
2003	World Indoor Championships	Birmingham, United Kingdom	6th	3000 m	7:44.34 (iNR)
2003	World Championships	Paris, France	7th	1500 m	3:33.99
2004	World Indoor Championships	Budapest, Hungary	6th	3000 m	8:02.86
2004	Olympic Games	Athens, Greece	8th	1500 m	3:37.17
2006	European Championships	Gothenburg, Sweden	8th	5000 m	13:58.70

== Electoral history ==
Electoral history of Gert-Jan Liefers
Year	Body	Party	Pos.	Votes	Result		Ref.
Year	Body	Party	Pos.	Votes	Party seats	Individual	Ref.
2023	House of Representatives	Party for Sports	4	237	0	Lost	
