= Vyacheslav Shabunin =

Russian middle distance runner (born 1969)

Vyacheslav Vasilyevich Shabunin (Russian: Вячеслав Васильевич Шабунин) (born 27 September 1969 in Kamyshlov, Sverdlovsk Oblast) is a Russian middle distance runner who specializes in the 1500 metres. After a career that took him to three Olympics, he has continued into masters athletics. In 2010, he set world records in the M40 category for the 1500 metres, mile run, and 3000 metres.

== Competition record ==
Year	Competition	Venue	Position	Event	Notes
Representing the Unified Team
1992	World Cup	Havana, Cuba	8th	5000 m	14:28.74
Representing Russia
1994	European Indoor Championships	Paris, France	5th	1500 m	3:45.37
1994	Goodwill Games	St. Petersburg, Russia	4th	Mile	3:53.54
1994	European Championships	Helsinki, Finland	21st (h)	1500 m	3:42.91
1995	World Indoor Championships	Barcelona, Spain	5th	1500 m	3:45.40
1995	World Championships	Gothenburg, Sweden	9th (sf)	1500 m	3:38.61
1996	Olympic Games	Atlanta, United States	18th (h)	1500 m	3:38.56
1997	World Indoor Championships	Paris, France	10th	1500 m	3:44.85
1997	World Championships	Athens, Greece	32nd (h)	1500 m	3:40.46
1998	European Championships	Budapest, Hungary	9th	1500 m	3:42.98
1999	World Championships	Seville, Spain	19th (h)	1500 m	3:39.70
2000	European Indoor Championships	Ghent, Belgium	5th	1500 m	3:43.44
2000	Olympic Games	Sydney, Australia	30th (h)	1500 m	3:41.52
2001	World Indoor Championships	Lisbon, Portugal	8th (h)	1500 m	3:39.40
2002	European Indoor Championships	Vienna, Austria	9th	1500 m	3:52.52
2003	World Championships	Paris, France	8th	1500 m	3:34.37
2003	World Athletics Final	Monte Carlo, Monaco	9th	1500 m	3:42.72
2004	World Indoor Championships	Budapest, Hungary	15th (h)	3000 m	7:53.92
2005	European Indoor Championships	Madrid, Spain	12th (h)	1500 m	3:44.56
2007	European Indoor Championships	Birmingham, United Kingdom	7th (h)	1500 m	3:45.86
2008	Olympic Games	Beijing, China	34th (h)	1500 m	3:42.53

== Personal bests ==
- 800 metres - 1:47.00 min (1996)
- 1500 metres - 3:32.28 min (2000)
- 3000 metres - 7:39.24 min (1995)
- 5000 metres - 13:43.39 min (1994)
- Half marathon - 1:01:29 hrs (1996)
