= Martin Johns =

New Zealand middle-distance runner

Personal information
- Born: 5 July 1969 (age 57) Wellington, New Zealand

Sport
- Sport: Track and field

Martin Paul Johns (born 5 July 1969) is a New Zealand middle-distance runner.

Johns was born in 1969 in Wellington. He ran in the men's 1,500 metres at the 1996 Summer Olympics with a time of 3:44.91, but did not advance.
