= Alexis Sharangabo =

Rwandan middle-distance runner

Personal information
- Born: 9 November 1978 (age 47)

Sport
- Sport: Track and field

Alexis Sharangabo (born 9 November 1978) is a retired Rwandan middle-distance runner who specialised in the 1500 metres. He represented his country at two Summer Olympics, in 1996 and 2000, failing to reach semifinals.

Collegiately, Sharangabo competed for Brevard College in Brevard, North Carolina winning the 2000 NAIA Men's Cross Country Championship individual title and graduating in 2003. He was inducted into the Brevard College Hall of Fame in 2014.

== Competition record ==
Year	Competition	Venue	Position	Event	Notes
Representing Burundi
1994	Jeux de la Francophonie	Bondoufle, France	8th (h)	1500 m	3:48.97^{1}
1994	World Junior Championships	Lisbon, Portugal	36th (h)	800m	1:56.06
1994	World Junior Championships	Lisbon, Portugal	19th (h)	1500m	3:51.60
Representing Rwanda
1996	Olympic Games	Atlanta, United States	45th (h)	1500 m	3:46.42
1996	World Junior Championships	Sydney, Australia	27th (h)	1500 m	3:57.01
1997	World Championships	Athens, Greece	40th (h)	1500 m	3:44.95
1997	Universiade	Catania, Italy	21st (h)	1500 m	3:51.89
1999	World Indoor Championships	Maebashi, Japan	17th (h)	1500 m	3:49.81
1999	All-Africa Games	Johannesburg, South Africa	–	1500 m	DNF
2000	Olympic Games	Sydney, Australia	34th (h)	1500 m	3:44.06
2001	Jeux de la Francophonie	Ottawa, Canada	6th	1500 m	3:46.85
2001	Jeux de la Francophonie	Ottawa, Canada	6th	5000 m	13:57.79
2001	World Championships	Edmonton, Canada	29th (h)	1500 m	3:42.72

^{1}Did not finish in the final

== Personal bests ==
Outdoor

- 800 metres – 1:49.35 (Nassau 1999) NR
- 1500 metres – 3:38.16 (Palo Alto 2000) NR
- One mile – 3:57.82 (Falmouth 2000)

Indoor

- 1500 metres – 3:49.81 (Maebashi 1999) NR
