= Hicham El Guerrouj =

Moroccan middle-distance runner (born 1974)

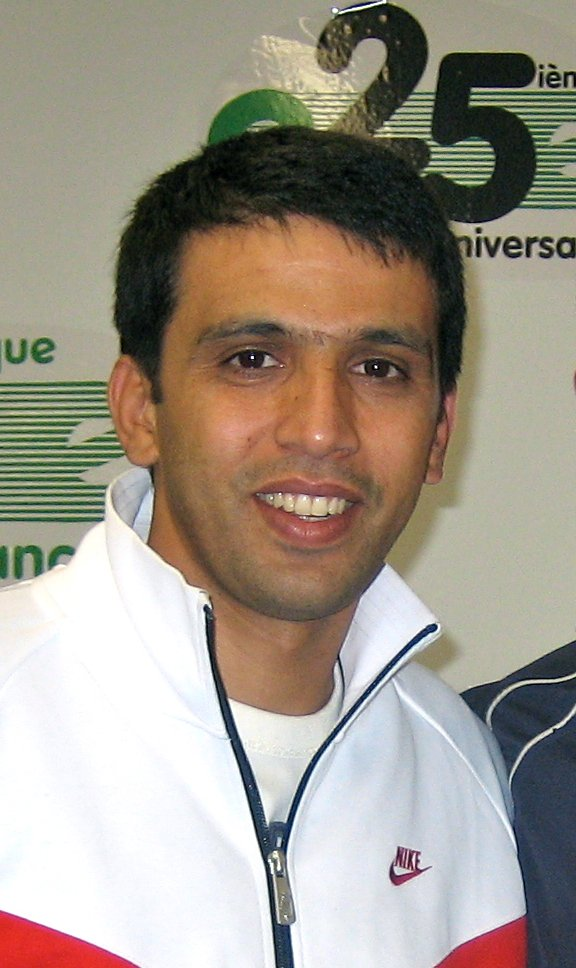
- El Guerrouj in 2010

Personal information
- Born: 14 September 1974 (age 52) Berkane, Morocco
- Height: 176 cm (5 ft 9 in)
- Weight: 58 kg (128 lb)

Sport
- Country: Morocco
- Sport: Track
- Events: 1500 metres, mile, 2000 metres, 5000 metres
- Turned pro: 1994
- Retired: 2004

Achievements and titles
- Olympic finals: 1996 Atlanta; 1500 m, 12th 2000 Sydney; 1500 m Silver; 2004 Athens; 1500 m Gold; 5000 m Gold
- World finals: 1995 Göteborg; 1500 m Silver; 1997 Athens; 1500 m Gold; 1999 Seville; 1500 m Gold; 2001 Edmonton; 1500 m Gold; 2003 Paris; 1500 m Gold; 5000 m Silver
- Personal bests: Outdoors; 1500 m: 3:26.00 WR (Rome 1998); Mile: 3:43.13 AR (Rome 1999); 2000 m: 4:44.79 AR (Berlin 1999); 3000 m: 7:23.09 NR (Brussels 1999); 5000 m: 12:50.24 (Ostrava 2003); Indoors; 1500 m: 3:31.18i (Stuttgart 1997); Mile: 3:48.45i (Ghent 1997); 3000 m: 7:33.73+i (Liévin 2003); Two Miles: 8:06.61i (Liévin 2003)
Medal record
Men's athletics
Representing Morocco
Event	1st	2nd	3rd
Olympic Games	2	1	0
World Championships	4	2	0
World Indoor Championships	3	0	0
Total	9	3	0
Olympic Games
Gold medal – first place	2004 Athens	1500 m
Gold medal – first place	2004 Athens	5000 m
Silver medal – second place	2000 Sydney	1500 m
World Championships
Gold medal – first place	1997 Athens	1500 m
Gold medal – first place	1999 Sevilla	1500 m
Gold medal – first place	2001 Edmonton	1500 m
Gold medal – first place	2003 Paris	1500 m
Silver medal – second place	1995 Gothenburg	1500 m
Silver medal – second place	2003 Paris	5000 m
World Indoor Championships
Gold medal – first place	1995 Barcelona	1500 m
Gold medal – first place	1997 Paris	1500 m
Gold medal – first place	2001 Lisbon	3000 m

Hicham El Guerrouj (Arabic: هشام الݣروج; Berber languages: ⵀⵉⵛⴰⵎ ⵍⴳⵔⵔⵓⵊ, romanized: Hisham El Gerruj; born 14 September 1974) is a retired Moroccan middle-distance runner who is the current world record holder in the 1500 metres. He formerly held the world records in the 2000 metres and mile. At the 2004 Summer Olympics, he became the first man since Paavo Nurmi to win gold medals in both the 1500 m and 5000 metres at the same Olympic Games.

Regarded as one of the greatest middle-distance runners of all time, he recorded six of the 10 fastest 1500 m performances in history and four of the 10 fastest performances in the mile as of June 2026. El Guerrouj's mile world record of 3:43.13 lasted for 27 years (1999–2026). He and Jakob Ingebrigtsen are the only men to have run faster than 3:27 for the 1500 m and 3:44 for the mile. El Guerrouj is also the only man to have broken 3:27 in the 1500 m more than once, achieving the feat five times.

El Guerrouj won four consecutive world titles in the 1500 m, taking gold at the 1997, 1999, 2001, and 2003 World Athletics Championships. He was named World Athlete of the Year three times and was inducted into the International Association of Athletics Federations (IAAF) Hall of Fame in November 2014.

== Early life and career ==
Born in Berkane, Hicham El Guerrouj comes from a family of farmers. He initially pursued soccer and basketball in his sporting endeavors, but his spark in the sport of athletics came at the age of 13, when a local coach recognized his talent and encouraged him to pursue the sport. According to El Guerrouj, his urban upbringing and close proximity to a sports stadium allowed him to watch athletics competitions often, fueling his passion for running.

El Guerrouj's first international triumph was at age 18, when he came third in the 5000 metres of the 1992 Junior World Championships in Seoul, behind Haile Gebrselassie of Ethiopia and Ismael Kirui of Kenya. A year later, he was the #2 man on the Moroccan team at the World Junior Cross Country Championships.

In 1994, he was a member of the Moroccan team in the 1994 IAAF World Road Relay Championships, which won the race in world record time.

El Guerrouj rose to international prominence in the mid-1990s with near-record times in the 1500 metres and mile. At the age of 20 he finished second in the 1500 metres to then world record holder Noureddine Morceli at the 1995 World Championships in Gothenburg. In 1996 after setting a new personal best in the 1500 metres of 3:29.59 in Stockholm, he was considered one of the favourites for the Olympic gold.

== 1996 Atlanta Olympics – 1999 season ==
El Guerrouj competed in his first Olympic Games in 1996 at Atlanta. Running the 1500 metres final, as he was moving into position to challenge for the lead, he fell with 400 m to go and finished last in 12th place. He had been expected to challenge the world record holder and three-time World champion, Noureddine Morceli.

One month later, at the Grand Prix final in Milan, El Guerrouj became the first runner to defeat Morceli over 1500 m in four years. In the following years, El Guerrouj became the only middle distance runner to win four consecutive world titles in 1997, 1999, 2001, and 2003.

El Guerrouj set two world indoor records at the start of the 1997 season, starting with a 1500 m record of 3:31.18 at the Sparkassen Cup, which was not beaten until 22 years later, in 2019 by Samuel Tefera. He also set a new indoor world record of 3:48.45 in the mile run at the Indoor Flanders meeting a few weeks later, which stood until Yomif Kejelcha bettered the mark in 2019.

In 1998 in Rome, El Guerrouj broke Morceli's 1500 m world record (3:27.37) with a time of 3:26.00. With an average pace of 54.93 seconds per lap, this record still stands today, and is the first performance in the 1500 m where the pace averaged under 55 seconds per lap.

In 1999, also in Rome, El Guerrouj broke the world record in the mile set by Morceli in 1993, with a time of 3:43.13, completing the first 1500 metres in 3:28.21. Noah Ngeny of Kenya, who ran second, was also under the previous world record with a time of 3:43.40, which remained the second place world record until 2026. This was the first time in over 40 years that two men had bettered the mile world record in the same race, neither of which had been broken until 2026 when Josh Kerr beat El Guerrouj's mile record in London, UK.

Later that season he set a new world record over 2000 m in Berlin at 4:44.79, bettering the previous mark set by Morceli by more than three seconds, that has since been broken by Jakob Ingebrigtsen, who ran 4:43.13 in 2023. In 1999 El Guerrouj also ran what was then the second fastest 3000 m ever in Brussels, with a time of 7:23.09.

== 2000 Sydney Olympics – 2003 season ==
At the Sydney Olympics, El Guerrouj was favourite to take gold but finished second in the 1500 metres, behind Noah Ngeny, a talented Kenyan runner at the peak of his career who had run as El Guerrouj's pacemaker when El Guerrouj ran his 1500m world record in Rome in 1998.

El Guerrouj successfully defended his 1500 m title in the 2001 and 2003 World Championships and came close to breaking his own 1500 m record in Brussels in 2001 with a time of 3:26.12. He also won 3 consecutive IAAF Golden League prizes in 2001, 2002 and 2003. He was the only middle distance athlete to produce the winning streak necessary to be entitled for a share of the jackpot of 50 kilograms (1,608 troy ounces) of gold (2000–2002) or US$1 million (1998–1999, 2003–present). As of 2011 he was the only athlete to have won it three times in a row.

In 2003, El Guerrouj set a personal best of 12:50.24 in the 5000 metres, which is the 26th fastest ever in the event. Later in the year, at the World Track & Field Championships, he finished a close second to Kenyan Eliud Kipchoge in the 5000 metres, adding a silver to the gold he had previously won in the 1500 metres.

== 2004 Athens Olympics and retirement ==
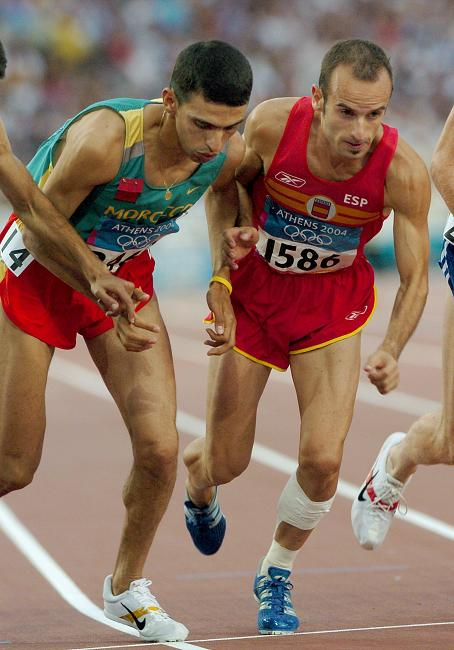
El Guerrouj and Carlos García at the 2004 Summer Olympics in Athens

After a relatively poor start to the 2004 season that included slow times and an 8th-place finish in a 1500-metre race in Rome, El Guerrouj entered both the 1500 metres and the 5000 metres at the 2004 Summer Olympics in Athens, Greece.

Only 20 days before the Olympic final, 2000 Olympic bronze medalist Bernard Lagat ran the fastest 1500 m in 2004 (3:27.40), narrowly defeating El Guerrouj (3:27.64) at the Weltklasse Zürich meet on August 6. On August 24, in the final straight of the Olympic 1500m final, El Guerrouj beat Lagat by 0.12 seconds, winning the gold medal. In the finale, entering the home straight El Guerrouj led, only to be overtaken by Lagat- and then El Guerrouj re-took the lead a few strides from the line.

Four days later, El Guerrouj won the 5,000 m final with a time of 13:14.39, preventing Kenenisa Bekele from achieving the 5000 m/10000 m distance double, last achieved by Ethiopian Miruts Yifter in 1980 Moscow Olympics.

El Guerrouj became the first man in 80 years to win both 1500m and 5000m titles in the same Olympics, previously achieved only by the "Flying Finn" Paavo Nurmi in 1924.

On 16 May 2005, El Guerrouj was nominated for the Laureus World Sports Award for Sportsman of the Year.

Having fulfilled his sporting ambitions & due to injuries from his years of high intensity training, El Guerrouj never competed internationally again after the 2004 Olympics and announced his retirement on May 22, 2006.

== Awards and honors ==
His sporting career is marked by numerous recognitions such as the award for humanitarian effort from the International Association of Athletics Federations (IAAF), which he received in 1996. He is also a UNICEF Goodwill Ambassador. El Guerrouj was named IAAF World Athlete of the Year in 2001, 2002 and 2003 after remaining unbeaten in more than 20 races, becoming the first man to win the award in consecutive years. He was also named best athlete of the year by the athletics journal Track and Field News in 2002. In 2003, he was elected as a member of the IAAF Athletes Committee.

On September 7, 2004, El Guerrouj was decorated with the "Cordon de Commandeur" by King Mohammed VI of Morocco. In the same year, he was awarded the Prince of Asturias Awards.

He was a member of the International Olympic Committee Athletes' Commission from 2004 to 2012.

Hicham El Guerrouj is today an Ambassador for Peace and Sport, a Monaco-based international organization, as well as a member of its "Champions for Peace" club, a group of 54 famous elite athletes committed to serving peace in the world through sport.

== Personal life ==
During the 1996 Summer Olympics, after his devastating fall in the 1500 metres final, El Guerrouj received a call from King Hassan II, then the King of Morocco, who told him, "Do not cry. You are a champion in the eyes of the Moroccan people." In response to this call, El Guerrouj later said, "After the call by His Majesty, it was another el-Guerrouj who was born. There is no similarity to the el-Guerrouj before this call and the el-Guerrouj right now."

On 27 September 2003, El Guerrouj married Najoua Lahbil. They have a daughter named Hiba.

El Guerrouj is an admirer of Roger Bannister, whom he considers to be his "spiritual father." El Guerrouj met Bannister in 2000, and attended a 70-year anniversary event of Bannister's first sub-four minute mile on 6 May 2024 in Oxford, England. In 2019, he also attended the World Athletics Heritage Mile Night in Monaco, which was organized by Sebastian Coe.

In 2024, reflecting on the differences between the mile and 1500 metres, El Guerrouj stated the following:

"My favourite is 1500m. It's part of my heart. I competed in it a lot and I know every metre of this race. The mile is completely different. If you are not strong physically and mentally, you cannot run it well."

El Guerrouj attended the opening ceremony of the 2024 Summer Olympics, and was also a torchbearer. He also attended the 2024 Wanda Diamond League Final in Brussels on 13 September, where he greeted Jakob Ingebrigtsen at the finish line of the 1500 m.

== International competitions ==
Year	Competition	Venue	Position	Event	Result
Representing Morocco
1992	World Junior Championships	Seoul, South Korea	3rd	5000 m	13:46.79
1995	World Indoor Championships	Barcelona, Spain	1st	1500 m	3:44.54
1995	World Championships	Gothenburg, Sweden	2nd	1500 m	3:35.28
1996	Olympic Games	Atlanta, United States	12th	1500 m	3:40.75
1997	World Indoor Championships	Paris, France	1st	1500 m	3:35.31
1997	World Championships	Athens, Greece	1st	1500 m	3:35.83
1999	World Championships	Seville, Spain	1st	1500 m	3:27.65 CR
2000	Olympic Games	Sydney, Australia	2nd	1500 m	3:32.32
2001	World Indoor Championships	Lisbon, Portugal	1st	3000 m	7:37.74
2001	World Championships	Edmonton, Canada	1st	1500 m	3:30.68
2003	World Championships	Paris, France	1st	1500 m	3:31.77
2003	World Championships	Paris, France	2nd	5000 m	12:52.83
2004	Olympic Games	Athens, Greece	1st	1500 m	3:34.18
2004	Olympic Games	Athens, Greece	1st	5000 m	13:14.39

== Personal bests ==
The following table includes El Guerrouj's personal best times as published by the IAAF:

Distance	Time	Date	Location	Notes
800 metres	1:47.18	2 June 1995	Turin	
1000 metres	2:16.85	12 July 1995	Nice	
1500 metres	3:26.00	14 July 1998	Rome	WR
Indoor 1500 metres	3:31.18	2 February 1997	Stuttgart	4th all time
Mile	3:43.13	7 July 1999	Rome	2nd all time
Indoor mile	3:48.45	12 February 1997	Ghent	9th all time
2000 metres	4:44.79	7 September 1999	Berlin	2nd all time
3000 metres	7:23.09	3 September 1999	Brussels	4th all time
Indoor 3000 metres	7:33.73	23 February 2003	Liévin	
Indoor 2 miles	8:06.61	23 February 2003	Liévin	9th all time
5000 metres	12:50.24	12 March 2003	Ostrava	
Ekiden	1:57:56	17 April 1994	Litochoro	

== Awards ==
- World Athlete of the Year: 2001, 2002, 2003
- Track & Field News Athlete of the Year: 1999, 2001, 2002
- L'Équipe Champion of Champions: 2005
- IAAF Hall of Fame: 2014

== See also ==
- 1500 metres world record progression
- Mile run world record progression

== References and notes ==
Records
Preceded by Noureddine Morceli	Men's 1500 m World Record Holder; July 14, 1998 –	Succeeded by Incumbent
Preceded by Noureddine Morceli	Men's Mile World Record Holder; July 7, 1999 – 18 July 2026	Succeeded by Josh Kerr
Awards and achievements
Preceded by Haile Gebrselassie; Virgilijus Alekna	Men's Track & Field News Athlete of the Year; 1999; 2001, 2002	Succeeded by Virgilijus Alekna; Félix Sánchez
Preceded by Jan Železný	IAAF World Athlete of the Year; 2001 – 2003	Succeeded by Kenenisa Bekele
Preceded by Michael Schumacher	L'Équipe Champion of Champions; 2004	Succeeded by Roger Federer
Sporting positions
Preceded by Haile Gebrselassie; Benjamin Limo	Men's 3000 m Best Year Performance; 1999; 2003	Succeeded by Ali Saïdi-Sief; Eliud Kipchoge
