= Ali Ibrahim (athlete) =

Djiboutian middle-distance runner

Ali Ibrahim (born 15 February 1971) is a Djiboutian middle-distance athlete.

== Competition Results ==
Ibrahim competed in the 1996 Summer Olympics held in Atlanta, and entered the 1500 metres where he ran into 10th place in his heat thus not qualifying for the next round.
