= Ahmed Krama =

Algerian middle-distance runner

Personal information
- Nationality: Algerian
- Born: 14 February 1973 (age 53) Algeria
- Height: 177 cm (5 ft 10 in)
- Weight: 64 kg (141 lb)

Sport
- Country: Algeria
- Sport: Middle-distance running

Ahmed Krama is an Algerian Olympic middle-distance runner. He represented his country in the men's 1500 meters at the 1996 Summer Olympics. His time was a 3:42.09.
