= Shane Healy =

Irish middle-distance runner

Personal information
- Nationality: Irish
- Born: 5 October 1968 (age 57)

Sport
- Sport: Middle-distance running
- Event: 1500 metres

Shane Healy (born 5 October 1968) is an Irish middle-distance runner. He competed in the men's 1500 metres at the 1996 Summer Olympics, where he reached the semi-finals.

== Biography ==
Healy was born in Dublin, and spent his early years in Goldenbridge Orphanage, after his mother left the family when he was four years old, and his father moved to Manchester. In his late teens, Healy had moved to the United States, working as a waiter, before coming back to Ireland. In the late 1980s, he had travelled to Gibraltar, finding work on a yacht to get money to travel back to North America.

Healy was 22 years old when he took up running, to win a bet for fifty Dollars. Healy eventually earned a place at Adams State University, in Alamosa, Colorado, where he began running. By the mid 1990s, he had managed to run within one second of the Olympic qualification standard for the 1500m. At a qualification event in Madrid, Healy ran a personal best time to gain a place on the Irish team for the 1996 Summer Olympics in Atlanta. In 1999, Healy initially retired from the sport, but would later make a comeback.

In March 2019, Healy set a new world record for the 1500m indoors in the over 50s category. The following month, he won a bronze medal at the Masters World Cross Country Championships in Poland. In 2020, a documentary about Healy, titled Documentary on One: Shane Healy Back on Track, was aired on RTÉ Radio 1.
