= António Travassos =

Portuguese middle-distance runner

Personal information
- Full name: António Silva Travassos
- Nationality: Portuguese
- Born: 24 September 1971 (age 55) Coruche, Portugal

Sport
- Sport: Middle-distance running
- Event: 1500 metres
Medal record
Representing Portugal
Summer Universiade
Bronze medal – third place	1997 Catania	1500m

António Vicente da Silva Travassos (born 24 September 1971) is a Portuguese middle-distance runner. He competed in the men's 1500 metres at the 1996 Summer Olympics.
