= Jason Pyrah =

American middle-distance runner (born 1969)

Personal information
- Born: April 6, 1969 (age 57) Springfield, Missouri, United States

Sport
- Sport: Track and field
Medal record
Men's Athletics
Representing the United States
Pan American Games
Bronze medal – third place	1995 Mar del Plata	1500 m

Jason Pyrah (born April 6, 1969, in Springfield, Missouri) is an American athlete who participated in the 1500-meter run at the 1996 and 2000 Summer Olympics. He did not qualify for the final in 1996, but did qualify in 2000, placing 10th.

As a teenager, he attended Willard High School in Willard, Missouri where he excelled in track and field. He was a Missouri state track champion in multiple events over two years. Pyrah did not compete in the 1990–91 season because of a mission to Bolivia. Pyrah graduated from Brigham Young University in 1993. In 1994, he won the Fifth Avenue Mile, and in 1995, he won a bronze medal in the 1500-meter run at the Pan American Games. His mile best is a 3:55.
