= Isaac Viciosa =

Spanish middle-distance runner

Personal information
- Born: 26 December 1969 (age 56) Cervatos de la Cueza, Spain

Sport
- Sport: Track and field
Medal record
Representing Spain
European Championships
Gold medal – first place	1998 Budapest	5000 m
Silver medal – second place	1994 Helsinki	1500 m

Isaac Carlos Viciosa Plaza (born 26 December 1969) is a Spanish former middle distance runner.

Viciosa is a former European record holder at 3000m and the first European man under 7:30. He won European Championships 1998 for 5000m, and was 2nd for 1500m at European Championships 1994. He was the winner of the Cross Internacional de Venta de Baños twice consecutively in 1997 and 1998, and he won the second Cross de Atapuerca race in his native Spain at the age of 35.

== Personal life ==
His daughters Maria and Angela Viciosa are also distance runners.

== Achievements ==
Year	Competition	Venue	Position	Event	Notes
Representing Spain
1988	World Junior Championships	Sudbury, Canada	19th (sf)	800m	1:53.43
1992	European Indoor Championships	Genoa, Italy	4th	1500 m	3:43,23
1994	European Championships	Helsinki, Finland	2nd	1500 m	3:36.01
1995	World Indoor Championships	Barcelona, Spain	8th	3000 m	8:01.00
1995	World Championships	Gothenburg, Sweden	12th	1500 m	3:41.12
1998	European Indoor Championships	Valencia, Spain	4th	3000 m	7:55.45
1998	World Cross Country Championships	Marrakesh, Morocco	11th	Short race (4 km)	11:13
1998	World Cross Country Championships	Marrakesh, Morocco	4th	Team	87 pts
1998	European Championships	Budapest, Hungary	1st	5000 m	13:37.46
1998	World Cup	Johannesburg, South Africa	2nd	3000 m	7:56.47
1999	World Championships	Seville, Spain	13th	5000 m	13:49.59
2001	World Championships	Edmonton, Canada	14th	5000 m	14:01.32
2002	World Cross Country Championships	Dublin, Ireland	14th	Short race (4.208 km)	12:39
2002	World Cross Country Championships	Dublin, Ireland	3rd	Team	57 pts

=== Personal bests ===
- 800 metres – 1:46.90 min (1996)
- 1500 metres – 3:30.94 min (1998)
- One mile – 3:52.72 min (1994)
- 3000 metres – 7:29.34 min (1998)
- 5000 metres – 13:09.63 min (1998)
- 10,000 metres – 28:26.75 min (2003)
