= Noureddine Morceli =

Algerian middle-distance runner

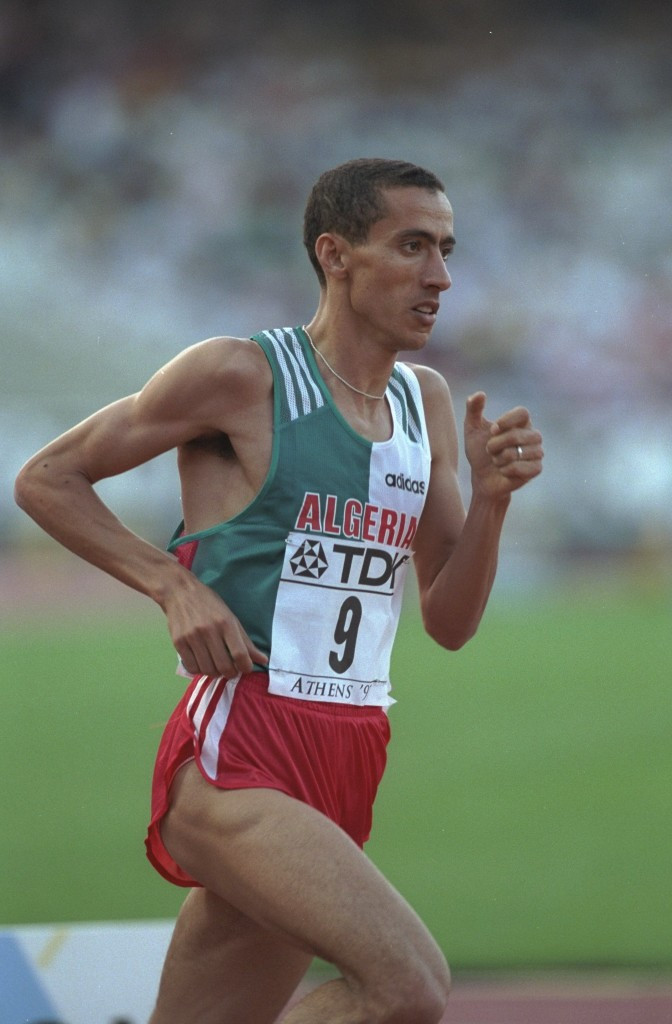

Personal information
- Born: 28 February 1970 (age 56) Ténès, Algeria
- Height: 175 cm (5 ft 9 in)
- Weight: 60 kg (132 lb)

Sport
- Country: Algeria
- Sport: Track
- Event: 1500 metres
- Turned pro: 1989
- Retired: 2001

Achievements and titles
- Personal bests: 800 metres: 1:44.79; 1500 metres: 3:27.37 NR; Mile: 3:44.39 NR; 3000 metres: 7:25.11; 5000 metres: 13:03.85
Medal record
Men's athletics
Representing Algeria
Olympic Games
Gold medal – first place	1996 Atlanta	1500 m
World Championships
Gold medal – first place	1991 Tokyo	1500 m
Gold medal – first place	1993 Stuttgart	1500 m
Gold medal – first place	1995 Gothenburg	1500 m
World Indoor Championships
Gold medal – first place	1991 Seville	1500 m
World Junior Championships
Silver medal – second place	1988 Sudbury	1500 m
Mediterranean Games
Gold medal – first place	1993 Narbonne	1500 m

Noureddine Morceli (Arabic: نور الدين مرسلي, Nūr ud-Dīn Mursilī; born February 28, 1970) is a retired Algerian middle-distance runner. The winner of the 1500 metres at the 1996 Summer Olympics, Morceli won three straight gold medals at that distance at the World Championships in Athletics. He set world records in the 1500 m, mile, 2000m, and 3000 metres. One time during his career, he held 6 world records at the same time.

In international competition, Morceli was twice the gold medallist in the mile at the Goodwill Games (1994 and 1998), the Arab champion in the 1500 m in 1988, the Millrose Games champion in the mile in 1992 and 1993, the 1500 m winner at the 1994 IAAF World Cup, and the overall champion in the 1994 IAAF Grand Prix series. He was Algerian national champion in the 1500 m in 1989.

== Biography ==
At age seven Morceli was inspired by his brother Abderrahmane, a world-class runner who finished fourth in the 1,500 metres in the 1977 World Cup; later his brother would become Morceli's coach. In the early 1980s, Morceli came to idolize Saïd Aouita, a Moroccan who won the gold medal in the 5,000 metres in the 1984 Olympic Games. By age 17 Morceli had taken second place in the 1,500 metres in the world junior championships. A year later, he enrolled at Riverside Community College in California, which had been recommended for its coaching and track facilities. He spent two years there, at the end of which he had run the world's fastest 1,500 metres for 1990. At age 20 he was ranked first in the world in the 1,500 metres. In 1992 he added to his accomplishments the outdoor world record for the 1,500 metres, in 1993 for the mile, and in 1994 for the 3,000 metres. By the end of 1994, the Algerian track star's accomplishments had reached even greater proportions. In August, after breaking the outdoor world record for 3,000 metres (7 min 25.11 sec), he had claimed five middle-distance world records, which also included (outdoor) the 1,500 metres (3 min 28.86 sec) and the mile (3 min 44.39 sec) and (indoor) the 1,000 metres (2 min 15.26 sec) and the 1,500 metres (3 min 34.16 sec).

Morceli was named Athlete of the Year by Track & Field News in 1993 and 1994 and by the International Athletic Foundation in 1994. In that two-year period, he lost only once, at 800 metres. As he set his sights on more records, most notably the 800-metre, 2,000-metre, and 5,000-metre events, his driving force was a deeply rooted dedication to bring glory to his country. As Morceli looked forward to the 1995 season, sportswriters unabashedly proclaimed him the greatest runner in the world or even the greatest of all time. Perhaps his spirit was best exemplified by his winning performance in the 1994 Grand Prix. Racked with flu, weakened and hacking, he not only ran but left the field behind at the finish. Morceli was soon tested by a new challenger, Moroccan Hicham El Guerrouj. Morceli bested El Guerrouj in the 1,500 metres at the 1995 outdoor world championships; however, the 1,500-metre race at the 1996 Olympic Games in Atlanta the following year was considered one of the most dramatic contests in athletics history. Morceli and El Guerrouj led the field with 400 metres to go when the young Moroccan tripped on his rival's heel and fell to the ground, with Morceli going on to capture the gold medal in that event. At the Grand Prix final in Milan later that year, however, Morceli lost the 1,500-metre event for the first time in years—to El Guerrouj. Morceli competed in subsequent events, including the 2000 Games in Sydney, before his eventual retirement.

== Career ==
=== Early career ===
Born in Ténès, Morceli rose to athletic prominence after winning the silver medal in the 1500 m at the World Junior Championships in 1988. Morceli attended Riverside Community College in Riverside, California, and throughout his career, in winter, he would return there to enjoy the mild climate and train.

Morceli was coached by his brother Abderrahmane who ran for Algeria in the Moscow Olympics of 1980 and in Los Angeles in 1984.

=== 1990–1992 ===
In 1990, he moved up to senior class and set the season's best mark of 3:37.87 in 1500 m. He continued this dominance into 1991, when he broke the world indoor record for 1500 m at Seville on February 28, setting a new mark of 3:34.16. Only nine days later, on the same track, he won the 1500 m title at the World Indoor Championships. Throughout the outdoor season 1991 Morceli remained undefeated over 1500 m. At several Grand Prix meetings he ran times around 3:31 min. At the World Championships in Tokyo, Morceli was already a clear favourite for the 1500 m and he won easily. He set a new World Championships record (3:32.84) and finished with a remarkable two-second-lead between him and the silver medallist Wilfred Kirochi (Kenya).

In the beginning of 1992, Morceli ran a new 1000 m indoor world record of 2:15.26. There seemed to be no greater certainty for a gold medal at the Olympic Games in Barcelona later that year than Morceli. But prior to the Olympic Games Morceli lost unexpectedly to Gennaro di Napoli in Rome and David Kibet in Oslo. There were signs that he was not in the same shape as the year before. However, in the Olympic semi-final he looked strong. The Olympic final was run at a woefully slow pace, with the field passing through the 800 m mark in a slower time than in the women's final. That was not the sort of pace to which Morceli had become accustomed, or that he was comfortable with, and when the frantic sprint for home began, he found himself unable to respond, eventually finishing a disappointing seventh. Only three days after the final Morceli set a world season's best in Monaco and a week later he broke his personal best to win in Zurich in 3:30.76. In September 1992 Morceli set a new 1500 m world record of 3:28.86 in Rieti.

=== 1993–1995 ===
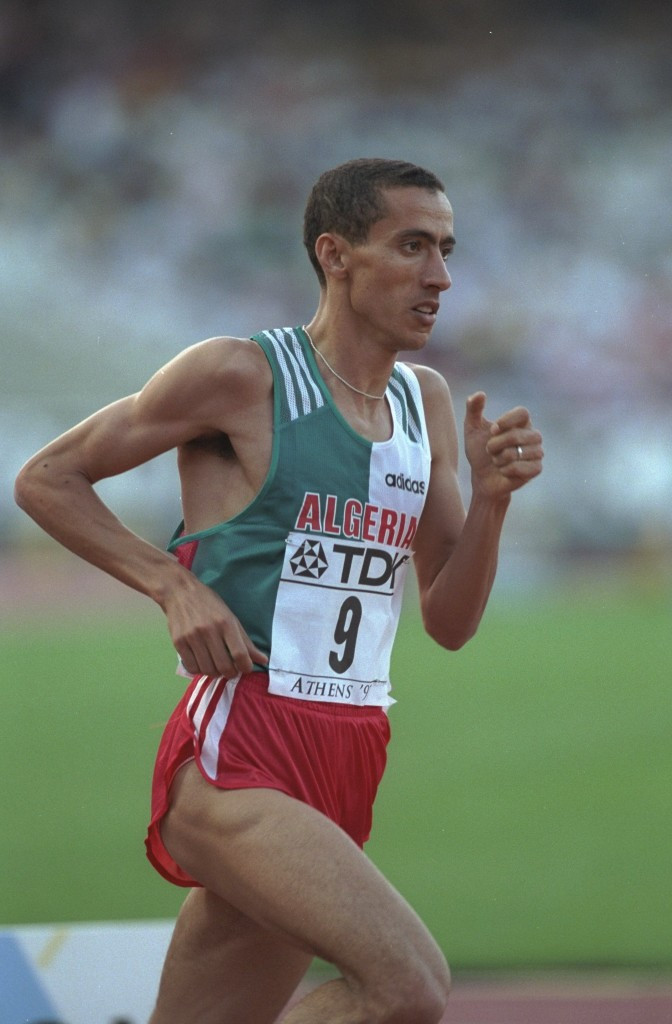
Noureddine Morceli in the 1997 World Championships in Athletics.

In 1993 Morceli narrowly missed his own world record when he won the Mediterranean Games in Narbonne in 3:29.20 min. By that time Morceli had set himself a new aim: to break Steve Cram's eight-year-old record over the Mile (3:46.32). Throughout the season he was virtually without any serious competitors. In Monaco he narrowly missed the 3000 m world record. There was even talk that he might skip the World Championships in order to concentrate fully on the world-record hunt. However, in the end he decided to take part. At the World Championships in Stuttgart, the final of 1500 m started at a relatively slow pace, but Morceli was always in complete control, sprinting away in the last lap to win easily and retain his world title. In the following weeks he failed twice to set a new world record over the Mile in Berlin and Brussels. But just two days after the race in Brussels he astonished everyone by crushing the old record with a time of 3:44.39, the first mile ran at 16 mph.

In 1994, he set the new 3000 m world record, clocking 7:25.11. He also experimented successfully with the 5000 m. In Zurich he outsprinted the rest of the field to take the victory (51.93 seconds last lap) and also won the 5000 m race in Rieti. The only defeat of the season came when Morceli opted for an unusual 800 m appearance in Cologne. Morceli broke the 2000 m world record in the following season, setting a new mark of 4:47.88. Nine days later Morceli set the last world record of his magnificent career, when he lowered his own 1500 m record to 3:27.37 in Nice. Only a few days after this he almost broke the record again when he triumphed in 3:27.52 in Monaco. Later on that year he defended easily the 1500 m World Champion title in Gothenburg. Shortly after, Morceli tried to improve on his Mile record in Zurich but did not succeed.

=== 1996–2000 ===
At the start of the 1996 season, Morceli set a world season's best of 3:29.50. However, a new and serious opponent suddenly appeared on the scene, when Hicham El Guerrouj won in Stockholm in a time of 3:29.59. At the 1996 Summer Olympics, Morceli was under enormous pressure. The final was run at an average pace when his main rival, Hicham El Guerrouj, fell down on the final lap. Morceli accelerated and crossed the line first ahead of the defending Olympic champion, Fermín Cacho. At the end of 1996 Morceli suffered his first 1500 m defeat in four years at the hands of El Guerrouj in Milan. In the 1997 World Championships at Athens, Morceli was fourth in 1500 m and in 1999, at Seville, he qualified for his fifth straight 1500 m final at a World Championships, where he dropped out at the bell while well out of medal contention. Morceli's last appearance at a major international championships was at the 2000 Olympic Games in Sydney.

=== Since retirement ===
Currently, Morceli serves as an ambassador of the sport by assisting with the International Olympic Commission, the African Games, as well as assisting the development of young track and field athletes in Algeria.

In January 2020, he was appointed Secretary of State for Elite Sport (reporting to Minister of Youth and Sports) in the new government chosen by Algerian president Abdelmadjid Tebboune after the presidential election of December 2019. Morceli was replaced by Judo champion Salima Souakri in June 2020 following a government change. Morceli has no political affiliation to any party in Algeria and was chosen as an independent member in the first Djerad government.

== Major International Competitions ==
Year	Competition	Venue	Position	Event	Notes
Representing Algeria
1988	World Junior Championships	Sudbury, Canada	2nd	1500 m	3:46.93
1991	World Indoor Championships	Seville, Spain	1st	1500 m	3:41.57
1991	World Championships	Tokyo, Japan	1st	1500 m	3:32.84 CR
1992	Olympic Games	Barcelona, Spain	7th	1500 m	3:41.70
1993	World Championships	Stuttgart, Germany	1st	1500 m	3:34.24
1995	World Championships	Gothenburg, Sweden	1st	1500 m	3:33.73
1996	Olympic Games	Atlanta, United States	1st	1500 m	3:35.78
1997	World Championships	Athens, Greece	4th	1500 m	3:37.37
1999	World Championships	Seville, Spain	12th	1500 m	DNF
2000	Olympic Games	Sydney, Australia	24th (sf)	1500 m	4:00.78

Records
Preceded by Saïd Aouita	Men's 1500 m World Record Holder; September 6, 1992 – July 14, 1998	Succeeded by Hicham El Guerrouj
Preceded by Steve Cram	Men's Mile World Record Holder; September 5, 1993 – July 7, 1999	Succeeded by Hicham El Guerrouj
Preceded by Moses Kiptanui	Men's 3000 m World Record Holder; August 2, 1994 – September 1, 1996	Succeeded by Daniel Komen
Awards and achievements
Preceded by Kevin Young	Men's Track & Field Athlete of the Year; 1993 – 1994	Succeeded by Haile Gebrselassie
Preceded by Michael Jordan	L'Équipe Champion of Champions; 1993	Succeeded by Romario
Sporting positions
Preceded by Moses Kiptanui	Men's 3000 m Best Year Performance; 1993 – 1994	Succeeded by Moses Kiptanui
