= Balázs Tölgyesi =

Hungarian middle-distance runner

Personal information
- Nationality: Hungarian
- Born: 10 January 1973 (age 53) Székesfehérvár, Hungary

Sport
- Sport: Middle-distance running
- Event: 1500 metres

Balázs Tölgyesi (born 10 January 1973) is a Hungarian middle-distance runner. He competed in the men's 1500 metres at the 1996 Summer Olympics.

Running for the Nebraska Cornhuskers track and field team, Tölgyesi anchored the winning 1996 distance medley relay at the NCAA Division I Indoor Track and Field Championships in a time of 9:32.13.

== Personal bests ==
Outdoor

- 800 metres – 1:46.05 (Rio de Janeiro 1998)
- 1500 metres – 3:35.57 (Atlanta 1996) NR
- Mile – 3:55.34 (Sheffield 1996)
- 2000 metres – 5:05.12 (London 1996)
- 3000 metres – 8:28.01 (St-Maur 2001)
- 5000 metres – 13:19.12 (San Juan Capistrano 2021)
- 10,000 metres – 27:45.78 (Palo Alto 2021)

Outdoor

- 800 metres – 1:47.73 (Lincoln 1997)
- 1500 metres – 3:39.42 (Boston 1997)
- Mile – 4:00.91 (Fairfax 1997)
- 3000 metres – 8:08.54 (Sindelfingen 1998)
