= Peter Philipp (athlete) =

Swiss middle-distance runner (born 1972)

Personal information
- Nationality: Swiss
- Born: 18 February 1972 (age 54) Chur, Switzerland

Sport
- Sport: Middle-distance running
- Event: 1500 metres

Peter Philipp (born 18 February 1972) is a Swiss middle-distance runner. He competed in the men's 1500 metres at the 1996 Summer Olympics.
