= Driss Maazouzi =

French middle-distance runner

Personal information
- Born: 15 October 1969 (age 56)
Medal record
Men's athletics
World Championships
Representing France
Bronze medal – third place	2001 Edmonton	1500 m
Mediterranean Games
Representing Morocco
Gold medal – first place	1997 Bari	1500 m
World Indoor Championships
Representing France
Gold medal – first place	2003 Birmingham	1500 m

Driss Maazouzi (Arabic: ادريس معزوزي; born 15 October 1969 in Meknès) is a French 1500 metres runner who won a bronze medal at the 2001 World Championships in Edmonton. He won the 2003 IAAF World Indoor Championships.

Maazouzi represented Morocco up to and during the 1996 Summer Olympics, but as a naturalised citizen of France he switched nationality shortly afterwards.
