= Kevin McKay (athlete) =

British track and field athlete

Personal information
- Nationality: British (English)
- Born: 9 February 1969 (age 56) Manchester, England
- Height: 178 cm (5 ft 10 in)
- Weight: 67 kg (148 lb)

Sport
- Sport: Athletics
- Event: Middle-distance
- Club: Sale Harriers

Kevin John McKay (born 9 February 1969) is a male retired track and field athlete who competed at the 1992 Summer Olympics and the 1996 Summer Olympics.

== Biography ==
McKay represented Great Britain in the men's 1500 metres at the 1992 Olympic Games in Barcelona and was also in the Great Britain team for the 1996 Olympic Games in Atlanta.

He represented England in the 1,500 metres event, at the 1994 Commonwealth Games in Victoria, Canada. Four years later he represented England in the 1,500 metres event again, at the 1998 Commonwealth Games in Kuala Lumpur, Malaysia.

McKay became the British 1500 metres champion after winning the British AAA Championships title at the 1992 AAA Championships and the 1994 AAA Championships.
