= Rüdiger Stenzel =

German middle-distance runner

Rüdiger Stenzel (born 16 April 1968, in Gelsenkirchen) is a former German middle distance runner who participated in several international championships in the 1990s.

He came second in the 1992 German championships behind Jens-Peter Herold thus qualifying for the Olympic 1500 metres competition where he went out before the final. He then got his first international finish with a tenth place at the 1993 World Championships. In a race in 1994 he defeated the Olympic champion Fermín Cacho but finished seventh in the European Championships in Helsinki where Cacho won gold. Later that year, however, Stenzel won the silver medal at the IAAF World Cup behind Noureddine Morceli.

Stenzel finished tenth at the 1995 IAAF World Indoor Championships and won a silver medal over 1500 m at the 1997 IAAF World Indoor Championships. One of his last appearances was at the 1999 World Championships in Seville where he went out in the semi-finals.

Stenzel won several German titles and set a personal best of 3:33.60 minutes in 1997 in Cologne. This result places him fifth on the German all-time performers list, behind Thomas Wessinghage, Harald Hudak, Jens-Peter Herold and Dieter Baumann. He competed for the sports club TV Wattenscheid during his active career.
