= Niall Bruton =

Irish middle-distance runner

Personal information
- Born: 27 October 1971 (age 54) Dublin, Ireland

Sport
- Sport: Track and field
Medal record
Representing Ireland
Summer Universiade
Gold medal – first place	1991 Sheffield	1500 m

Niall Bruton (born 27 October 1971) is a former Irish runner who specialized in the 1500 metres, retiring around 2000. From Dublin Niall went to Larkhill National School and then St. Aidan's C.B.S. in Whitehall, he ran with Clonliffe Harriers.

Bruton ran collegiately in the US for the University of Arkansas where he won the mile at the NCAA Indoor Championships in 1993 and 1994. He was named most outstanding performer among college men at the 1992 Penn Relays.

His personal best 1500 time was 3:35.67 minutes, achieved in August 1995 in Cologne. Bruton's best time in the mile was 3:53 run in Oslo in 1994.

His career was cut short, however, as he developed arthritis in his right hip, causing him to retire.

== Achievements ==
Year	Competition	Venue	Position	Event	Notes
Representing Ireland
1990	World Junior Championships	Plovdiv, Bulgaria	13th (h)	800m	1:49.64
1990	World Junior Championships	Plovdiv, Bulgaria	16th (h)	1500m	3:47.87
1991	Universiade	Sheffield, England	1st	1500 m	3:50.69
1994	Wanamaker Mile	New York City	1st	mile	3:58.71
1994	European Championships	Helsinki, Finland	10th	1500m	3:41.22
1995	World Indoor Championships	Barcelona, Spain	4th	1500 m	3:45.05
1995	World Championships	Gothenburg, Sweden	11th	1500 m	3:39.15
1997	World Indoor Championships	Paris, France	8th	1500 m	3:42.65
