= Luís Feiteira =

Portuguese long-distance runner

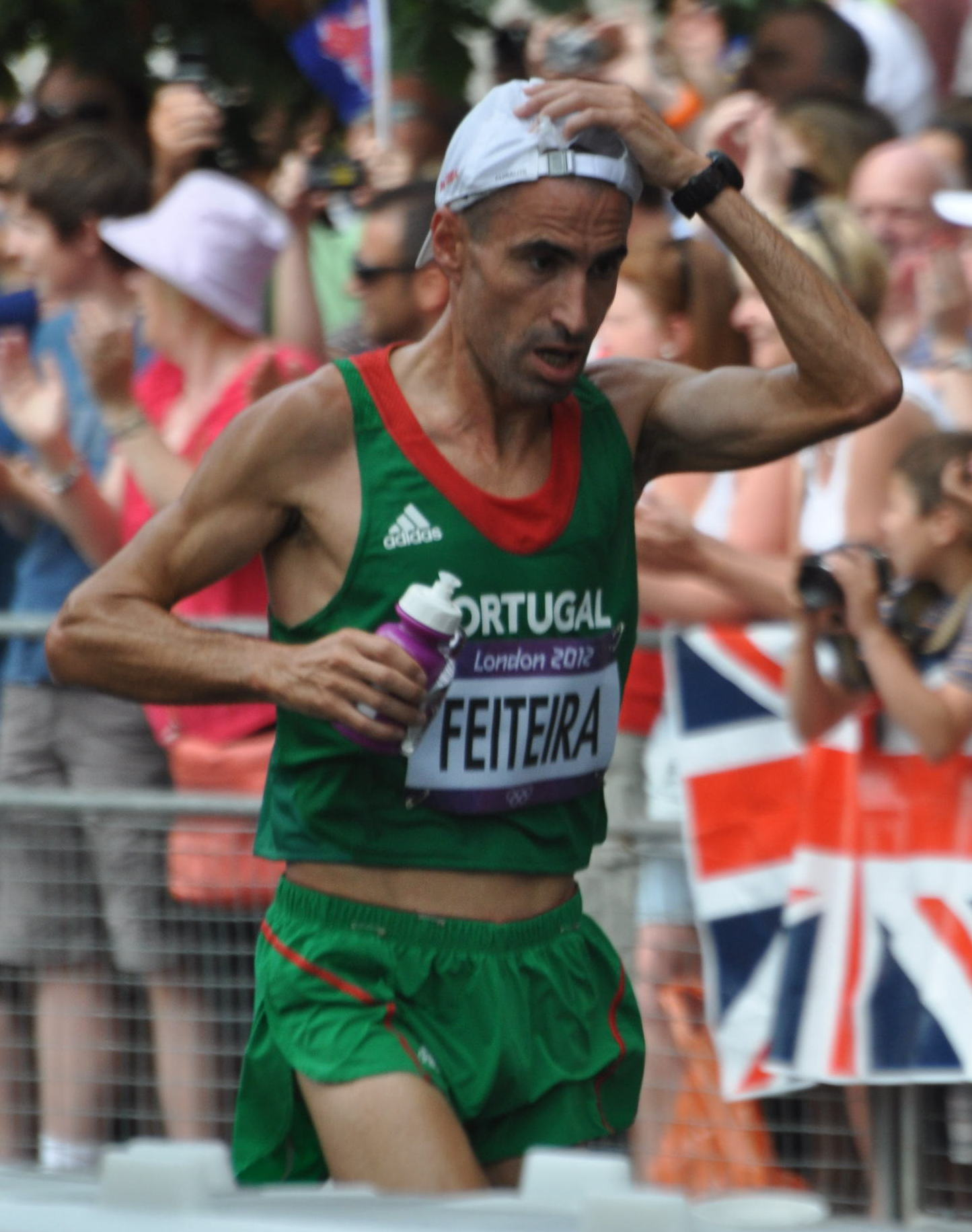
- Feiteira in the marathon at the 2012 Olympics in London

Personal information
- Born: 21 April 1973 (age 53)
- Height: 1.77 m (5 ft 9 1/2 in)
- Weight: 60 kg (130 lb)

Sport
- Country: Portugal
- Sport: Athletics
- Event: Marathon

Luís Feiteira (born 21 April 1973) is a Portuguese long-distance runner who specialises in marathon running.

== Achievements ==
Year	Competition	Venue	Position	Event	Notes
1996	Summer Olympics	Atlanta, United States	22nd (sf)	1500 m	3:40.31
2001	World Championships	Edmonton, Canada	10th (h)	1500 m	3:41.63
2007	World Championships	Osaka, Japan	35th	Marathon	2:29:34
2009	World Championships	Berlin, Germany	10th	Marathon	2:14:06
2010	European Championships	Barcelona, Spain	10th	Marathon	2:21:28
