= Julius Achon =

Ugandan middle-distance runner

Julius Achon OLY
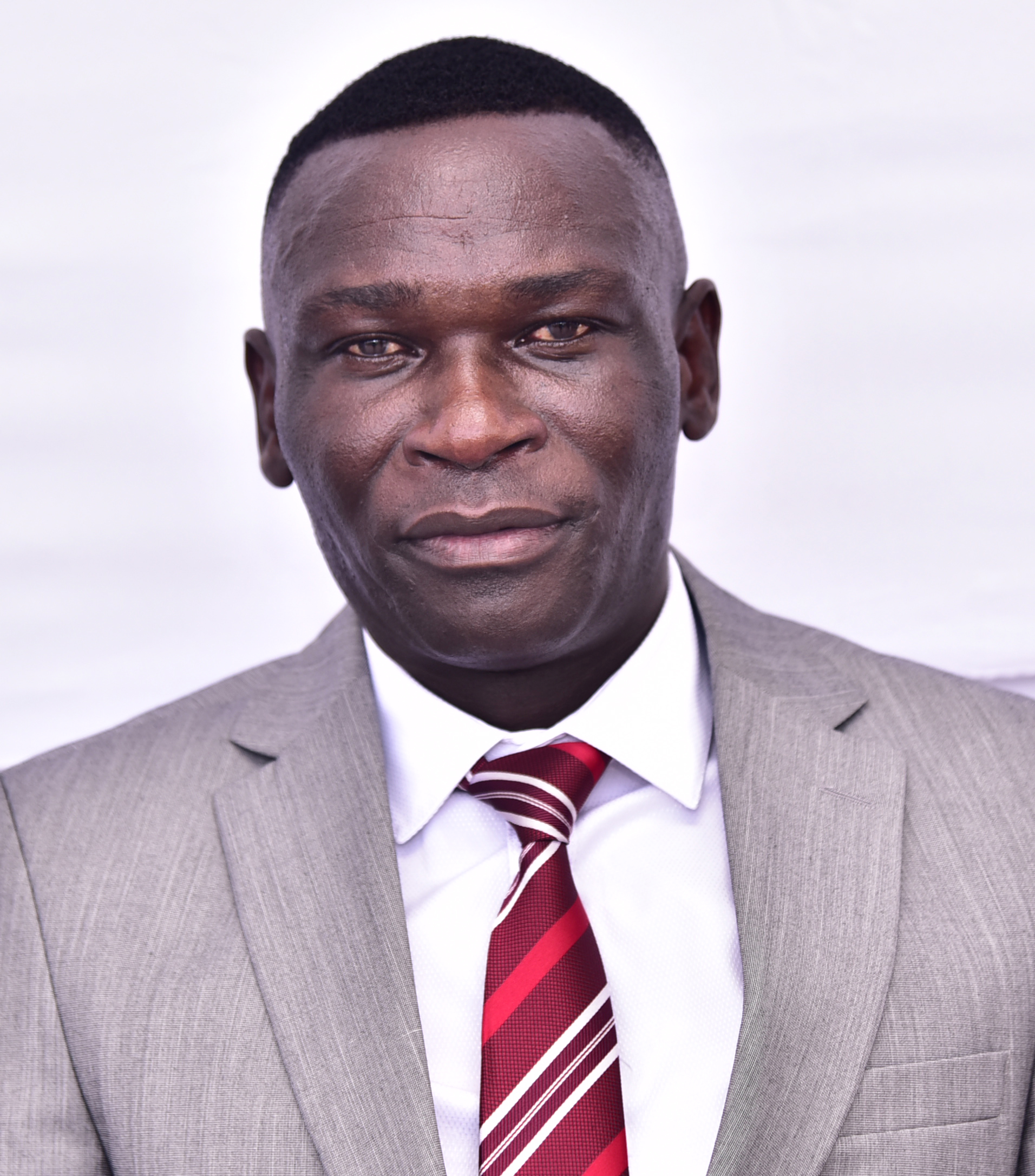

Personal information
- Nationality: Ugandan
- Born: 12 December 1976 (age 49)
- Years active: 1994–2005
- Height: 1.68 m (5 ft 6 in)
- Weight: 55 kg (121 lb)

Sport
- Sport: Track and Field
- Events: 800 metres; 1500 metres
- College team: George Mason

Achievements and titles
- World finals: 1994 World Junior Championships: 1500m - Gold
- Regional finals: 1995 All-Africa Games: 1500m - Bronze
- Personal bests: 800 metres: 1:44.55; 1500 metres: 3:35.68; Mile: 3:55.38; 3000 metres: 8:04.44; 5000 metres: 13:56.89
Medal record
Men's athletics
Representing Uganda
World Junior Championships in Athletics
Gold medal – first place	1994 Lisbon	1500 m
All-Africa Games
Bronze medal – third place	1995 Harare	1500 m
- Updated on 27 September 2012

Julius Achon

Member of the Parliament of Uganda
- Incumbent
- Assumed office 17 May 2016
- Preceded by: Omara Atubo
- Constituency: Otuke East

Personal details
- Party: National Resistance Movement

Julius Bua Achon (born 12 December 1976) is a Ugandan politician who serves as the Member of Parliament for Otuke East County in the 2026–2031 parliamentary term. He is also a retired middle-distance runner who specialised in the 800 metres and 1500 metres. Achon once held the 800m American Collegiate in-season Record with a time of 1:44.55 set in 1996 as a student at George Mason University. He competed in both the 1996 and 2000 Summer Olympics.

He is also the founder of the Achon Uganda Children's Fund, based in Portland, Oregon which opened a medical center in Northern Uganda in 2012. Achon served as a Member of the Ugandan 11th Parliament, representing Otuke East County in Otuke District in Northern Uganda. He successfully retained the seat in the 2026 elections and was subsequently sworn in as a member of the 12th Parliament (2026-2031) in May 2026. He is a member of the National Resistance Movement (NRM) party.

Achon's life story is chronicled in the book The Boy Who Runs, by John Brant.

== Early life ==
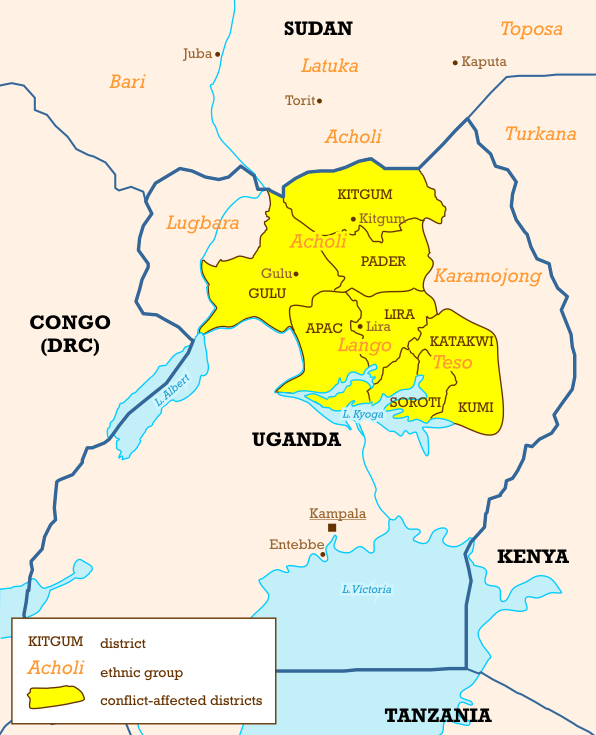
Ugandan districts affected by Lord's Resistance Army

At the age of 10, Achon began to run, inspired by stories of John Akii-Bua, the Ugandan 400m hurdler who won Olympic gold in 1972. When he was 12, Achon was abducted by the Lord's Resistance Army, which was waging a civil war, and taken to a camp 100 miles away. He escaped and a year later entered and won his first official race, which earned him a place at the district championships in Lira. To get to the stadium 42 miles away, Achon had to run for six hours. The following day he won the 800m, 1500m and 3000m.

His success at the district championships gave him a place at the national championships, where he won the 1500m in 4:09.52, watched by Christopher Banage Mugisha. He offered Achon a scholarship to an elite government-aided school in Kampala, which Achon took up.

== Athletic achievements ==
At the 1994 World Junior Championships, Achon became the first Ugandan to win gold, running the 1500m in 3:39.78. Victory was followed by offers of scholarships from a number of US colleges and he chose George Mason University. In 1996 he won the 800m NCAA title, setting a new US college record of 1:44.55. Later in the year, he ran in the heats of the 1500m at the Atlanta Olympics, serving as captain of the Ugandan Olympic team.

Achon went on to compete at the 2000 Sydney Olympics, where he reached the semifinal of the 1500m but did not participate in the Athens Games after his mother was killed by the LRA.

A car crash in May 2007 put an end to his running career. He had been intending to run the 5000m at the Ugandan National Athletics Championships in July 2007.

Year	Competition	Venue	Position	Event	Notes
Representing Uganda
1994	World Junior Championships	Lisbon, Portugal	4th	800m	1:48.85
1994	World Junior Championships	Lisbon, Portugal	1st	1500m	3:39.78
1995	All-Africa Games	Harare, Zimbabwe	3rd	1500 m	3:40.83
2001	World Indoor Championships	Lisbon, Portugal	8th	1500 m	3:53.03
2002	African Championships	Radès, Tunisia	6th	1500 m	3:43.00

== Coaching career ==
In 2003, John Cook, who coached Achon at George Mason, offered him a post as assistant coach with Alberto Salazar's Nike Oregon Project, pacing elite runners such as Galen Rupp, who competed at the Beijing Olympics. In 2010, budget cuts at Nike meant Achon lost his job but he began working part-time at the Nike store on campus instead.

== Achon Uganda Children's Fund ==
He founded the Achon Uganda Children's Fund. Achon started providing for children orphaned by the civil war in Uganda in 2003 when he discovered 11 orphans sheltering under a bus. He took them to his parents' home near Lira, where his father agreed to let them stay, while Achon sent money back from Portugal, where he was living and training. It only required $100 per month to feed them all.

In 2007, Achon met Jim Fee in Portland, Oregon; together they established the non-profit organization Achon Uganda Children's Fund, with Fee serving as an unpaid advisor. The purpose of the organization is to improve access to health care, clean water and education. Fee and Achon began fundraising to build a clinic in Awake to treat residents suffering from malaria and other illnesses. The Kristina Health Centre (KHC), named after his mother, opened in August 2012 and employs 12 staff. Fee died in 2013 from injuries suffered in a bicycle accident; today his wife Angela serves as AUCF's Executive Director, supported by an all-volunteer staff and board.

As of August 2018, the clinic treats over 300 patients per month, treating for injuries and various illnesses. KHC also conducts community outreach, teaching local residents about hygiene and health. The organization also continues to provide for the remaining children who have not yet aged out of the orphanage's services. Additionally, "AUCF" has joined with Australian organization Love Mercy to support a microfinance program known as "Cents For Seeds".

== Parliament ==
Achon was elected to the Ugandan Parliament, representing Otuke County in the 2016 Ugandan general election. He was reelected in the 2021 Ugandan general election.

== See also ==
- John Akii-Bua
- National Resistance Movement
- Uganda at the Summer Olympics
- Otuke District
