= Laban Rotich =

Former Kenyan runner

Medal record

Men's athletics

Representing Kenya

African Championships
| Gold medal – first place | 1998 Dakar | 1500 m |
| Silver medal – second place | 2002 Radès | 1500 m |

Laban Rotich (born 20 January 1969 in Mosoriot) is a retired Kenyan runner who specialized in the 1500 metres. His personal best time is 3:29.91 minutes, achieved in August 1998 in Zürich. He holds the world's best indoor performance over one mile for men over 35 years with 3:53.18 minutes.

== Achievements ==
| Year | Competition | Venue | Position | Event | Notes |
Representing Kenya
| 1996 | Olympic Games | Atlanta, United States | 4th | | |
| 1997 | World Championships | Athens, Greece | 11th | | |
| 1998 | Commonwealth Games | Kuala Lumpur, Malaysia | 1st | | |
| 1998 | African Championships | Dakar, Senegal | 1st | | |
| 1998 | IAAF World Cup | Johannesburg, South Africa | 1st | 1500m | |
| 1999 | World Indoor Championships | Maebashi, Japan | 2nd | | |
| 1999 | World Championships | Seville, Spain | 6th | | |
| 2001 | World Indoor Championships | Lisbon, Portugal | 4th | | |
| 2002 | African Championships | Radès, Tunisia | 2nd | | |
| 2003 | World Athletics Final | Monte Carlo, Monaco | 5th | | |
| 2004 | World Indoor Championships | Budapest, Hungary | 3rd | | |
| 2004 | World Athletics Final | Monte Carlo, Monaco | 3rd | | |
| 2005 | World Athletics Final | Monte Carlo, Monaco | 9th | | |
