= List of flag bearers for Somalia at the Olympics =

Somalia at the Olympics
- IOC code: SOM
- NOC: Somali Olympic Committee
- Website: www.nocsom.org
- Medals: Gold 0 Silver 0 Bronze 0 Total 0

Summer appearances
- 1972; 1976–1980; 1984; 1988; 1992; 1996; 2000; 2004; 2008; 2012; 2016; 2020; 2024

This is a list of flag bearers who have represented Somalia at the Olympics.

Flag bearers carry the national flag of their country at the opening ceremony of the Olympic Games.

#	Event year	Season	Flag bearer	Sport
1	1972	Summer	Mohamed Aboker	Athletics
2	1984	Summer	Abdi Bile	Athletics
3	1988	Summer	Aboukar Hassan Adani	Athletics
4	1996	Summer	Abdi Bile	Athletics
5	2000	Summer	Ibrahim Mohamed Aden	Athletics
6	2004	Summer	Mohamed Ahmed Alim	Official
7	2008	Summer	Duran Farah	Official
8	2012	Summer	Zamzam Mohamed Farah	Athletics
9	2016	Summer	Mohamed Daud Mohamed	Athletics
10	2020	Summer	Ramla Ali	Boxing
10	2020	Summer	Ali Idow Hassan	Athletics
11	2024	Summer	Ali Idow Hassan	Athletics

== See also ==
- Somalia at the Olympics
