= Somalia at the Olympics =

- IOC code: SOM
- NOC: Somali Olympic Committee
- Website: www.nocsom.com
- Medals: Gold 0 Silver 0 Bronze 0 Total 0

Summer appearances
- 1972; 1976–1980; 1984; 1988; 1992; 1996; 2000; 2004; 2008; 2012; 2016; 2020; 2024; 2028

Somalia first participated at the Olympic Games at the 1972 Summer Games in Munich, West Germany; the Somali Olympic Committee being recognised by the International Olympic Committee shortly prior. The nation has sent athletes to compete in most Summer Olympic Games since then, boycotting in 1976 due to the inclusion of New Zealand, and in 1980 when it joined with the American-led boycott. It also did not compete in 1992 due to the ongoing effects of a famine. Somalia entered their largest contingent of athletes at the 1984 Summer Olympics, a total of seven.

The nation has never participated in the Winter Olympic Games.

== Overseas Somali athletes ==
Due to the ongoing Somali Civil War, athletes have subsequently had difficulty training in Somalia and many have left to represent other nations, such as Mo Farah who has won four gold medals representing Great Britain. No athlete representing Somalia has yet won a medal at an Olympics, nor taken part in a Winter Games.

Abroad, Somali-born athletes have particularly excelled in long-distance running. Somali-born long-distance runners currently representing other countries include:

- Bashir Abdi, representing Belgium
- Abdi Nageeye, representing the Netherlands
- Abdi Hakin Ulad, representing Denmark
- Mustafa Mohamed, representing Sweden
- Mohammed Ahmed, representing Canada
- Mo Farah, representing the United Kingdom
- Abdihakem Abdirahman, representing the United States
- Hassan Mead, representing the United States

== National Olympic Committee ==
The Somali Olympic Committee was founded on 12 December 1959, in Mogadishu, by Ali Omar Scego as head of the organisation. It had been hoped that Somalia would be able to take part in the 1960 Summer Olympics in Rome, Italy, but after Scego was posted as Somalia's ambassador to Belgium, based in Brussels, those who succeeded him were unable to take the nation to the Games and the Committee was entirely abandoned.

The idea was resurrected in 1971, with the national associations of athletics, basketball and football signing up under the Committee's charter. Shortly prior to the 1972 Summer Olympics, it was recognised by the International Olympic Committee (IOC), allowing it to compete.

== History ==
=== Early years ===
Somalia made their Summer Olympic debut at the 1972 Games in Munich, West Germany, sending three athletes; Mohamed Aboker, Jama Awil Aden in track events and Abdullah Noor Wasughe in the high jump.

Somalia was eligible to compete at the 1976 Summer Olympics in Montreal, Quebec, Canada, but joined with 28 other countries in a boycott. This was after the IOC allowed New Zealand to participate in the Games, despite the breach of the international sports boycott of South Africa by the nation's rugby union team shortly before the Olympics. The majority of the 28 countries in the Olympic boycott were African nations. Prior to the 1980 Summer Olympics in Moscow, Soviet Union, Somalia once again joined in with a boycott of the Games, this time led by the United States over the 1979 invasion of Afghanistan during the Soviet–Afghan War.

When Somalia sent a contingent to the 1984 Summer Olympics, it was their largest group of competitors so far with seven male athletes. Ahmed Mohamed Ismail finished in 47th place in the marathon, while Abdi Bile reached the second round of the 800 metres. Ibrahim Okash went a round better in the 800 metres at the 1988 Summer Olympics in Seoul, South Korea, reaching the semi-finals of the competition.

Although Somalia registered athletes for the 1992 Summer Olympics in Barcelona, because of the ongoing famine, it did not participate. They returned once again at the 1996 Summer Olympics in Atlanta, United States, where they entered four male athletes. That year, Bile recorded the best performance by any Somali athlete at the Olympics so far, finishing sixth in the final of the 1500 metres.

=== 2000s ===
From the 2000 Summer Olympics in Sydney, Australia, onwards, Somalia reduced its contingent at each Games down to two competitors, one male and one female. This change meant that Somalia fielded female athletes for the first time, Safia Abukar Hussein becoming the first women to compete for her country at the Olympics. This still caused some issues due to the perception of women in athletes within Somalia, with Hussein's own father rejecting her for a period over fears that it would prevent her from finding a husband. However, they reconciled prior to the Games.

The 2004 Summer Olympics in Athens, Greece, was marked by controversy for Somalia. After Farah Weheliye Addo, the president of the Somali Olympic Committee, was found guilty of embezzling funds from the association football governing body FIFA. In response, FIFA banned him for ten years and complained to the IOC. In support, the IOC removed the accreditation for Addo, therefore banning him from the 2004 Games.

One of the Somali entrants at the 2008 Summer Olympics received a great deal of international media attention. Samia Yusuf Omar was a 16 year old sprinter, who had trained at the Mogadishu Stadium and around the city. The determination she showed despite the difficulty and harassment she received by local militia groups in the civil war was described as inspirational in the press. Following the Games, where she came last in her heat of the 200 metres in donated equipment, she fell out of the public eye because she was not interested in being involved in the media.

=== 2010s ===
Because of the ongoing Civil War, many Somali athletes have left the country and now compete under the flags of other nations. The most prominent example of this came at the 2012 Summer Olympics in London, United Kingdom, when Mo Farah won two gold medals for Great Britain; first the men's 10,000 metres on "Super Saturday", and then for the 5000 metres, during the following week.

It had been hoped that Omar would return at the London Games, but when she returned to Somalia after the 2008 Olympics, she was threatened by Islamic militant group Al-Shabaab, and no longer admitted she was an athlete. She wished to compete at the 2012 Games, and so left Somalia and travelled first to Ethiopia, then north to Libya, where she was trafficked and later drowned off the coast while attempting to cross the Mediterranean Sea to Italy, where she hoped to find a coach. Qadijo Aden Dahir, the Deputy Chairman for Somalia's athletics federation, said that "it's a sad death... She was our favourite for the London Olympics".

Somalia continued to send a one male and one female athlete to the 2012 and the 2016 Summer Olympics. Meanwhile, Farah was once again successful at the 2016 Games, winning two further gold medals for Great Britain.

== Medal table ==
Games	Athletes	Gold	Silver	Bronze	Total	Rank
1972 Munich	3	0	0	0	0	–
1976 Montreal	boycotted					
1980 Moscow	boycotted					
1984 Los Angeles	7	0	0	0	0	–
1988 Seoul	5	0	0	0	0	–
1992 Barcelona	did not participate					
1996 Atlanta	4	0	0	0	0	–
2000 Sydney	2	0	0	0	0	–
2004 Athens	2	0	0	0	0	–
2008 Beijing	2	0	0	0	0	–
2012 London	2	0	0	0	0	–
2016 Rio de Janeiro	2	0	0	0	0	–
2020 Tokyo	2	0	0	0	0	–
2024 Paris	1	0	0	0	0	–
2028 Los Angeles	future event					
2032 Brisbane	future event					
Total		0	0	0	0	–

== See also ==
- List of flag bearers for Somalia at the Olympics
- Category:Olympic competitors for Somalia
