= Somalia at the 2012 Summer Olympics =

- IOC code: SOM
- NOC: Somali Olympic Committee
- Website: www.nocsom.org

in London
- Competitors: 2 in 1 sport
- Flag bearer: Zamzam Mohamed Farah
- Medals: Gold 0 Silver 0 Bronze 0 Total 0

Summer Olympics appearances (overview)
- 1972; 1976–1980; 1984; 1988; 1992; 1996; 2000; 2004; 2008; 2012; 2016; 2020; 2024

Somalia participated at the 2012 Summer Olympics in London, United Kingdom, which took place from 27 July to 12 August 2012. The country's participation in London marked its ninth appearance in the Summer Olympics since its debut at the 1972 Summer Olympics. The delegation included one short-distance sprinter and one long-distance runner: Mohamed Hassan Mohamed and Zamzam Mohamed Farah. Both qualified for the games through wildcard places from the International Association of Athletics Federations. Farah was selected as the flag bearer for both the opening and closing ceremonies. Mohamed and Farah failed to advance beyond the heat stage of their respective events.

== Background ==
Somalia participated in nine summer Olympic games between its debut in the 1972 Summer Olympics in Munich, Germany and the 2012 Summer Olympics in London, United Kingdom. The country did not participate in the 1976 Summer Olympics and 1980 Summer Olympics due to boycotts relating to the New Zealand national rugby union team touring South Africa earlier in 1976 and the Soviet invasion of Afghanistan respectively. The nation also did not compete in the 1992 Summer Olympics, despite participating in the opening ceremony, because of the ongoing famine affecting the country. The highest number of Somalis participating at any single Summer Games was seven at the 1984 Games in Los Angeles, United States. No Somali athlete has ever won a medal at the Olympic Games but the country's best performance came at the 1996 Summer Olympics when Abdi Bile finished sixth in the men's 1500 metres. Somalia participated in the London Summer Games from 27 July to 12 August 2012.

Somalia received universality places (a wildcard for athletes who have not attained qualification standards) from the International Association of Athletics Federations to send one male and one female athlete to the 2012 Summer Olympics. The two athletes that were selected to represent Somalia at the London Games were Mohamed Hassan Mohamed in the men's 1500 metres and Zamzam Mohamed Farah in the women's 400 metres. Along with the two athletes, the country's delegation was led by chef de mission Omar Barajab. The athletes' training at Mogadishu Stadium and in the city's roads (which was for six days a week) was hampered by the death of the country's National Olympic Committee (NOC) president Aden Yabarow Wiish in a suicide bombing in April 2012, but their coach Ahmed Ali encouraged the runners not to let the event influence their training. Both competitors were not confirmed until July 2012 because the NOC did not wish to jeopardise their safety by making them targets. Long-distance runner Abdinasir Said Ibrahim had been due to compete but withdrew because of extreme stress caused by unsafe roads which lowered his mental morale. Farah was selected as the flag bearer for both the opening and closing ceremonies.

== Competitors ==
The following is the list of number of competitors participating in the Games and selected biographies.

Sport	Men	Women	Total
Athletics	1	1	2
Total	1	1	2

== Athletics ==
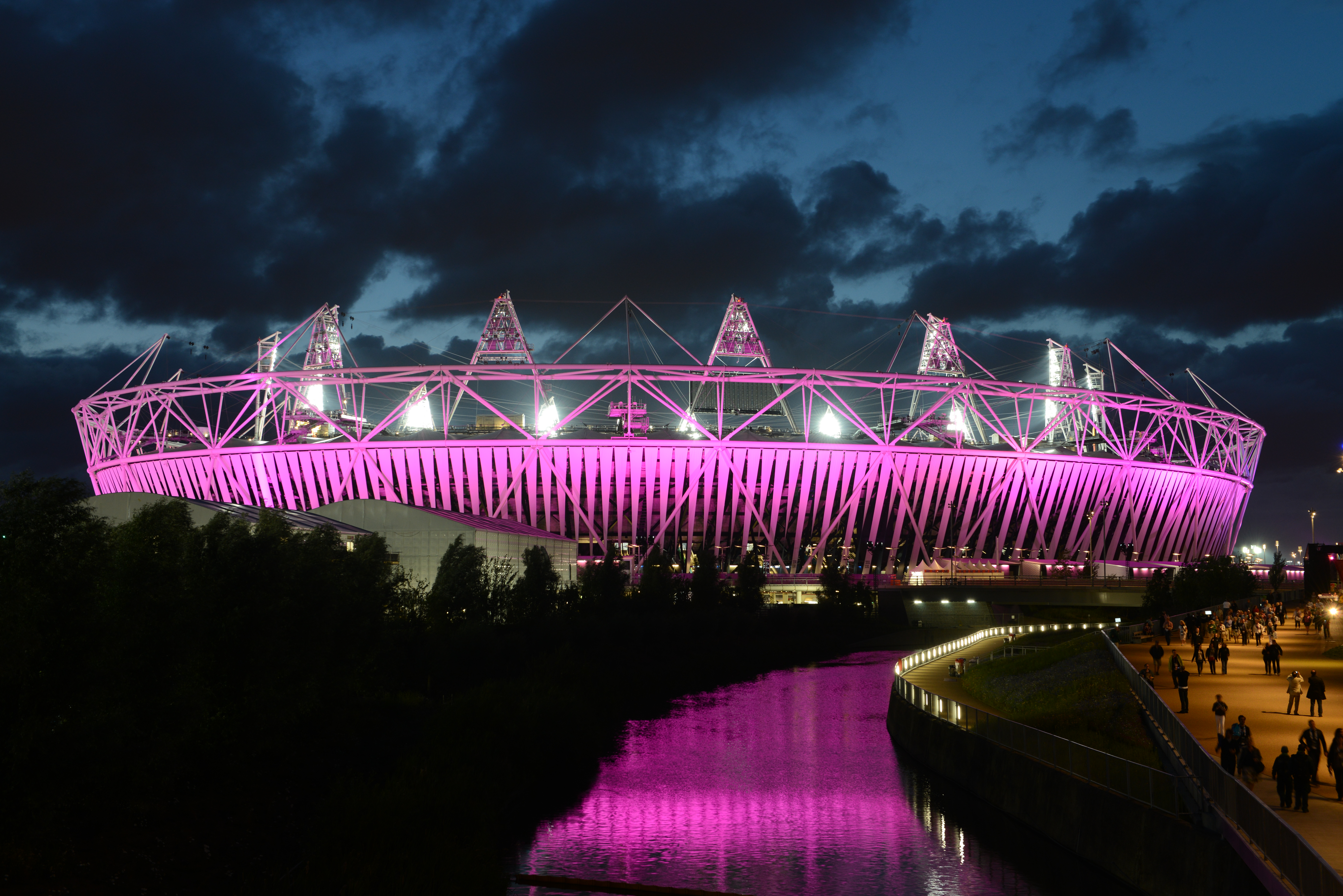
The London Olympic Stadium, where Mohamed and Farah competed in athletics events.

Mohamed was the youngest person to represent Somalia at the London Games at the age of 18. He had not participated in any previous Olympic Games. In an interview with The Guardian before the Games, Mohamed said he wanted people to see a Somali athlete competing at the Olympics and wanted to influence the international community's view of his country away from being a nation afflicted by war and without any development. He wanted to win a medal because of his long training routine. Mohamed was drawn in the men's 1500 metres second heat on 3 August, finishing 13th out of 14 athletes, with a time of three minutes and 46.16 seconds. He finished ahead of Yemen's Nabil Al-Garbi (three minutes and 55.46 seconds) but behind Jamale Aarrass of France (three minutes and 45.13 seconds) in a heat led by Saudi Arabia's Mohammed Shaween (three minutes and 39.42 seconds). Overall Mohamed placed 38th out of 43 participants, (Note: Two athletes, Teshome Dirirsa and Amine Laâlou did not start.) and did not progress into the semi-finals after finishing 6.21 seconds slower than the slowest athlete in his heat who made the later stages.

At the age of 21 years old, Zamzam Mohamed Farah was the only female athlete competing for Somalia at the 2012 Summer Olympics. She was making her first appearance in the quadrennial event. Prior to the competition, Farah spoke of her and Mohamed's training which involved running through manned militia road blocks who occasionally mistaken them for suicide bombers and threatened to shoot them. Despite this, she said that she was "very much excited" to compete at the Games: "I hope I will win, inshah’Allah [God willing]. That is what I am expected to do, so that I can change the narrative of Somalia." Farah competed in the first heat of the women's 400 metre discipline on 3 August, finishing seventh and last of all runners, with a time of one minute and 20.48 seconds. She finished behind Geisa Coutinho of Brazil (53.43 seconds) and Kazakhstan's Marina Maslyonko (53.66 seconds) in a heat led by Francena McCorory of the United States (50.78 seconds). Farah finished 45th (and last) out of all runners overall, (Note: Two runners did not finish, one was disqualified, and one was unable to start.) and was unable to advance into the semi-finals after finishing 28.39 seconds slower than the slowest competitor in her heat who made the later stages. After the event she was applauded by the crowd and said: "It was great to be here to participate in the Olympic Games and tell people Somalia is still here."

Key

- Note–Ranks given for track events are within the athlete's heat only

Men

Athlete	Event	Heat		Semifinal		Final	
Athlete	Event	Result	Rank	Result	Rank	Result	Rank
Mohamed Hassan Mohamed	1500 m	3:46.16	13	Did not advance			

Women

Athlete	Event	Heat		Semifinal		Final	
Athlete	Event	Result	Rank	Result	Rank	Result	Rank
Zamzam Mohamed Farah	400 m	1:20.48	8	Did not advance			
