= Somalia at the 1984 Summer Olympics =

- IOC code: SOM
- NOC: Somali Olympic Committee

in Los Angeles
- Competitors: 7 in 1 sport
- Flag bearer: Abdi Bile
- Medals: Gold 0 Silver 0 Bronze 0 Total 0

Summer Olympics appearances (overview)
- 1972; 1976–1980; 1984; 1988; 1992; 1996; 2000; 2004; 2008; 2012; 2016; 2020; 2024

Somalia competed at the 1984 Summer Olympics in Los Angeles, United States. The nation returned to the Olympic Games after boycotting both the 1976 and 1980 Games.

== Athletics ==
Men

Athlete	Event	First Round		Second Round		Semi Final		Final	
Athlete	Event	Result	Rank	Result	Rank	Result	Rank	Result	Rank
Ibrahim Okash	400 m	47.91	7	did not advance					
Abdi Bile	800 m	1:46.92	2 Q	1:46.49	5	did not advance			
Jama Mohamed Aden	800 m	1:48.64	4	did not advance					
Abdi Bile	1500 m	3:40.72	4 q	DQ		did not advance			
Jama Mohamed Aden	1500 m	3:46.80	5	did not advance					
Ali Mohamed Hufane	5000 m	did not finish		n/a		did not advance			
Mohiddin Mohamed Kulmiye	10000 m	29:37.93	11	n/a				did not advance	
Ahmed Mohamed Ismail	marathon	n/a						2.23:27	47
Abdul Lahij Ahmed	marathon	n/a						2.44:39	73

Key

- Note–Ranks given for track events are within the athlete's heat only
- Q = Qualified for the next round
- q = Qualified for the next round as a fastest loser or, in field events, by position without achieving the qualifying target
- NR = National record
- N/A = Round not applicable for the event
- Bye = Athlete not required to compete in round
