= Somalia at the 1996 Summer Olympics =

- IOC code: SOM
- NOC: Somali Olympic Committee

in Atlanta
- Competitors: 4 in 1 sport
- Flag bearer: Abdi Bile
- Medals: Gold 0 Silver 0 Bronze 0 Total 0

Summer Olympics appearances (overview)
- 1972; 1976–1980; 1984; 1988; 1992; 1996; 2000; 2004; 2008; 2012; 2016; 2020; 2024

Somalia was represented at the 1996 Summer Olympics in Atlanta, Georgia, United States by the Somali Olympic Committee.

In total, four athletes – all men – represented Somalia in one sport: athletics.

== Background ==
The Somali Olympic Committee was formed in 1971 and was recognised by the International Olympic Committee (IOC) the following year allowing the country to make its Olympic debut at the 1972 Summer Olympics in Munich, West Germany. They were absent from the 1976 Summer Olympics in Montreal, Quebec, Canada and missed the 1980 Summer Olympics in Moscow, Russian Soviet Federative Socialist Republic, Soviet Union after taking part in the United States-led boycott. They returned with a record delegation of seven athletes at the 1984 Summer Olympics in Los Angeles, California, United States. They did not compete at the 1992 Summer Olympics in Barcelona, Spain as a result of the 1992 famine in Somalia. The 1996 Summer Olympics in Atlanta, Georgia, United States marked Somalia's fourth appearance at the Olympics.

== Competitors ==
In total, four athletes represented Somalia at the 1996 Summer Olympics in Atlanta, Georgia, United States in one sport.

Sport	Men	Women	Total
Athletics	4	0	4
Total	4	0	4

== Athletics ==
In total, four Somali athletes participated in the athletics events – Aboukar Hassan Adani in the men's 5,000 metres, Ibrahim Mohamed Aden in the men's 800 m, Abdi Bile in the men's 1,500 metres and Abdi Isak in the men's marathon.

Athletes	Events	Heat Round 1		Heat Round 2		Semifinal		Final	
Athletes	Events	Time	Rank	Time	Rank	Time	Rank	Time	Rank
Ibrahim Mohamed Aden	800 metres	1:47.31	24	N/A		did not advance			
Abdi Bile	1,500 metres	3:42.32	3 Q	N/A		3:33.30	3 Q	3:38.03	6
Aboukar Hassan Adani	5,000 metres	15:19.80	36	N/A		did not advance			
Abdi Isak	Marathon	N/A						2:59:55	110

== Aftermath ==
Somalia have returned for every subsequent games but they have not sent a delegation larger than two athletes since the 1996 games. Until the 2020 Summer Olympics in Tokyo, Japan, all of their athletes had competed in the athletics events.
