= Somalia at the 2000 Summer Olympics =

- IOC code: SOM
- NOC: Somali Olympic Committee
- Website: www.nocsom.org

in Sydney
- Competitors: 2 in 1 sport
- Flag bearer: Ibrahim Mohamed Aden
- Medals: Gold 0 Silver 0 Bronze 0 Total 0

Summer Olympics appearances (overview)
- 1972; 1976–1980; 1984; 1988; 1992; 1996; 2000; 2004; 2008; 2012; 2016; 2020; 2024

Somalia sent a delegation to compete at the 2000 Summer Olympics in Sydney, Australia from 15 September to 1 October 2000. This was the African country's fifth appearance at a Summer Olympic Games, following their debut twenty-eight years earlier at the 1972 Summer Olympics. The delegation consisted of two athletics competitors: Ibrahim Mohamed Aden and Safia Abukar Hussein, the latter was Somalia's first female Olympic athlete. Neither of the two participants progressed beyond the first round of their respective competitions.

== Background ==
The Somali Olympic Committee was recognised by the International Olympic Committee (IOC) on 1 January 1972. The nation debuted that year in the 1972 Summer Olympics. Somalia participated in an African boycott over New Zealand's participation at the 1976 Summer Olympics, and joined a United States-led boycott of the 1980 Moscow Olympics over the Soviet invasion of Afghanistan. It did not compete again until the 1984 Summer Olympics. Somalia forwent the 1992 Summer Olympics, possibly because of the ongoing famine affecting the country; it had participated in the opening ceremony. This made Sydney their fifth appearance at a Summer Olympic Games.

Somalia took part in the 2000 Summer Olympics from 15 September to 1 October 2000. The delegation consisted of athletics competitors Ibrahim Mohamed Aden and Safia Abukar Hussein. Because of financial difficulties, Somali businesspersons contributed capital to the group. The nation was granted permission from the IOC to compete in the Olympics and the ruling body paid for the majority of the team's air travel to Sydney. The athletes were viewed by the media as having little opportunity to win Somalia's first medal. Aden was the flag bearer for the opening ceremony.

== Competitors ==
The following is the list of number of competitors in the Games.

Sport	Men	Women	Total
Athletics	1	1	2
Total	1	1	2

== Athletics ==
Ibrahim Mohamed Aden was 27 years at the time of the Sydney Games. He was competing in his second Olympic Games after the 1996 Summer Olympics. Because no other competitor could venture outside of Somalia to meet the required Olympic qualifying standards via a top-level international event, Aden was the sole Somali sportsperson to qualify for the Games. On 25 September, he took part in the first round heats of the men's 1500 metres and was assigned to compete in heat three. Aden completed the race in 3 minutes and 40.33 seconds, twelfth out of fourteen athletes in his heat, and 20th overall. He was therefore eliminated because he was 0.58 seconds behind the slowest qualifier in his heat who progressed to the semi-finals.

Competing at her first Summer Olympiad, Safia Abkhar Hussein was 19 years old, and was Somalia's first female Olympic athlete. This was problematic due to the perception of women in athletes within Somalia. Hussein's father disliked the idea over a concern of his that it would prevent her from finding a husband. Nevertheless, he subsequently allowed her to compete in Sydney. On 22 September, Hussein participated in the first round heats of the women's 400 metres. Drawn to the third heat, she finished the race in a time of 1 minute and 13.25 seconds, place sixth and last out of all runners in her heat. She was 57th and last overall and her time was insufficient to advance to the quarter-finals because she was 20.60 seconds slower than the slowest runner in her heat to progress to the next round.

Key

- Note–Ranks given for track events are within the athlete's heat only

Men

Athlete	Event	First Round		Semi Final		Final	
Athlete	Event	Result	Rank	Result	Rank	Result	Rank
Ibrahim Mohamed Aden	1500 m	3:40.33	12	did not advance			

Women

Athlete	Event	Heat		Quarter Final		Semi Final		Final	
Athlete	Event	Result	Rank	Result	Rank	Result	Rank	Result	Rank
Safia Abukar Hussein	400 m	1:13.25	6	did not advance					
