= List of Somali records in athletics =

The following are the national records in athletics in Somalia maintained by the Somali Athletics Federation (SAF).

== Outdoor ==
Key to tables: Awaiting ratification Record not kept by SAF Not ratified or later rescinded by SAF

=== Men ===
Event	Record	Athlete	Date	Meet	Place	Ref.
100 m	11.26 (+0.6 m/s)	Abdi Aziz Warsame	16 September 2011		Växjö, Sweden	
100 m	11.26 (+1.1 m/s)	Sakaria Hussein	15 June 2014		Halmstad, Sweden	
100 m	10.4 h	Hassan Islam	15 October 1977		Mogadishu, Somalia	
200 m	21.88	Ali Abdi Mohamed	21 December 1983		Riyadh, Saudi Arabia	
200 m	21.4 h	Mohamed Yusuf	1968		Mogadishu, Somalia	
400 m	47.91	Ibrahim Okash Omar	4 August 1984	Olympic Games	Los Angeles, United States	
800 m	1:43.60	Abdi Bile	16 August 1989	Weltklasse Zürich	Zürich, Switzerland	
1000 m	2:14.50	Abdi Bile	13 September 1989		Jerez de la Frontera, Spain	
1500 m	3:30.55	Abdi Bile	3 September 1989	IAAF Grand Prix	Rieti, Italy	
Mile	3:49.40	Abdi Bile	2 July 1988	Bislett Games	Oslo, Norway	
2000 m	4:59.77	Abdi Bile	14 June 1987		Fürth, Germany	
3000 m	7:42.18	Abdi Bile	21 August 1994		Cologne, Germany	
5000 m	13:22.38	Abdullahi Jama Mahamed	16 May 2025	Doha Diamond League	Doha, Qatar	
5000 m	13:06.32	Abdihamid Nur	6 May 2022	Sound Running Track Meet	San Juan Capistrano, California	
10,000 m	28:06.65	Abdihakim Abdirahman	7 May 1999		Palo Alto, United States	
10,000 m	28:04.46	Mohamed Guled (Note: citizenship unclear; US by World Athletics source)	28 March 2026	The TEN	San Juan Capistrano, United States	
10 km (road)	28:03	Ilyas Yonis Osman	7 March 2021	Berlin 10k Invitational	Berlin, Germany	
10 km (road)	27:51 (Note: unconfirmed distance, probably short course)	Mohammed Osman Guled	7 April 2023	NAS Sports Tournament 10K	Dubai, United Arab Emirates	
Half marathon	1:03:01	Ismail Abdi	30 March 2002	Internationaler Osterlauf	Paderborn, Germany	
Marathon	2:17:24	Ahmed Mohamed Ismail	19 October 1986	Detroit Free Press Marathon	Detroit, United States	
110 m hurdles						
400 m hurdles	1:03.6 h	Mohamed Ahmed Omar	19 April 2008		Djibouti, Djibouti	
3000 m steeplechase	8:50.31	Mohamed Abdikadar Sheikh Ali	20 July 2014		Rovereto, Italy	
High jump	2.05 m	Abdulle Noor Wasughe	July 1972		Mogadishu, Somalia	
High jump	2.05 m	Ali Mohamed Mudey	18 November 1977		Mogadishu, Somalia	
Pole vault	3.50 m	Mohamed Osman Yussuf	1970		Sheikh, Somalia	
Long jump	7.35 m	Abdulle Noor Wasughe	24 August 1972	Olympic Games	Munich, West Germany	
Triple jump	14.95 m	Mohamed Osman Yussuf	1968		Sheikh, Somalia	
Shot put	12.78 m	Abdi Omar Koshinga	October 1983		Mogadishu, Somalia	
Discus throw	33.00 m	Abdi Omar Koshinga	October 1983		Mogadishu, Somalia	
Hammer throw	15.10 m	Ahmed Yahye	31 July 2010	Southern Men's League Division 1	Peterborough, United Kingdom	
Javelin throw	34.16 m	Ahmed Yahye	31 July 2010	Southern Men's League Division 1	Peterborough, United Kingdom	
Decathlon						
Decathlon	100m (wind) / Long jump (wind) / Shot put / High jump / 400m / 110m H (wind) / Discus / Pole vault / Javelin / 1500m					
20 km walk (road)						
50 km walk (road)						
4 × 100 m relay	43.6 h	Somalia	10 April 1980		Baghdad, Iraq	
4 × 400 m relay	3:10.85	Somalia; Ibrahim Okash Omar; Ibrahim Aden; Abdi Mohamed Abdukadir; O.A. Arale	11 August 1987	All-Africa Games	Nairobi, Kenya	

=== Women ===
Event	Record	Athlete	Date	Meet	Place	Ref.
100 m	13.23	Hawa Abdullahi Ahmed	7 August 1987	All-Africa Games	Nairobi, Kenya	
200 m	28.43	Fowzia Jilalow	18 July 1986		Athens, Greece	
400 m	1:04.89	Jamad Ismail Abdi	7 August 1987	All-Africa Games	Nairobi, Kenya	
800 m	2:22.1 h	Qaali Haagi Aden	6 September 1979		Mogadishu, Somalia	
1500 m	4:41.6 h	Hacha Nour Hassan	28 August 1982	African Championships	Cairo, Egypt	
3000 m	10:15.2 h	Hacha Nour Hassan	26 August 1982	African Championships	Cairo, Egypt	
5000 m						
10,000 m						
Marathon	4:58:20	Leila Ismail	16 January 2009	Dubai Marathon	Dubai, United Arab Emirates	
100 m hurdles						
400 m hurdles						
3000 m steeplechase						
High jump	1.65 m	Faduna Abdallah Hussein	24 July 1978		Algiers, Algeria	
Pole vault						
Long jump	5.05 m	Nadifa Sheikh Aboker	15 September 1977		Mogadishu, Somalia	
Long jump	5.05 m	Nasteho Essa Mohamud	7 May 2006		Mogadishu, Somalia	
Triple jump						
Shot put	8.67 m	Amina Ali	4 September 1979		Mogadishu, Somalia	
Discus throw	23.29 m	Nadia Sallam Salah Ali	8 May 2011	Campionato Di Societa' Piemontese	Santhià, Italy	
Hammer throw						
Javelin throw						
Heptathlon						
Heptathlon	100m H (wind) / High jump / Shot put / 200m (wind) / Long jump (wind) / Javelin / 800m					
20 km walk (road)						
4 × 100 m relay	50.6 h	Somalia	18 November 1977		Mogadishu, Somalia	
4 × 400 m relay	4:12.76	Somalia; Fowzia Jilalow; Hawa Abdullahi Ahmed; M.A. Adawe; Jamad Ismail Abdi	11 August 1987	All-Africa Games	Nairobi, Kenya	

== Indoor ==
=== Men ===
Event	Record	Athlete	Date	Meet	Place	Ref.
60 m	8.08	Yahya Idrissa	17 November 2024	SuperKrack 1	Antwerp, Belgium	
200 m						
400 m						
800 m	1:49.17	Ibrahim Okash	8 February 1986		East Rutherford, United States	
1500 m	3:38.50	Abdi Bile	16 February 1986		Fairfax, United States	
Mile	3:58.16	Abdi Bile	14 February 1986		New York, United States	
3000 m	7:53.76	Ibrahim Mohamed Aden	13 February 1998	Millrose Games	New York City, United States	
3000 m	7:40.66 OT	Abdihamid Nur	11 February 2022	Husky Classic	Seattle, United States	
5000 m	13:19.01	Abdihamid Nur	11 March 2022	NCAA Division I Championships	Birmingham, United States	
60 m hurdles						
High jump						
Pole vault						
Long jump						
Triple jump						
Shot put						
Heptathlon						
Heptathlon	60m / Long jump / Shot put / High jump / 60m H / Pole vault / 1000m					
5000 m walk						
4 × 400 m relay						

=== Women ===
Event	Record	Athlete	Date	Meet	Place	Ref.
60 m						
200 m						
400 m						
800 m						
1500 m						
3000 m						
60 m hurdles						
High jump						
Pole vault						
Long jump						
Triple jump	7.98 m	Sabrina Gaddour	2 March 2013		Padua, Italy	
Shot put						
Pentathlon						
Pentathlon	60m H / High jump / Shot put / Long jump / 800m					
3000 m walk						
4 × 400 m relay						
