= Somalia at the 2008 Summer Olympics =

- IOC code: SOM
- NOC: Somali Olympic Committee
- Website: www.nocsom.org

in Beijing
- Competitors: 2 in 1 sport
- Flag bearer: Duran Farah
- Medals: Gold 0 Silver 0 Bronze 0 Total 0

Summer Olympics appearances (overview)
- 1972; 1976–1980; 1984; 1988; 1992; 1996; 2000; 2004; 2008; 2012; 2016; 2020; 2024

Somalia sent a delegation to compete at the 2008 Summer Olympics in Beijing, China. The country's participation at Beijing marked its seventh in the Summer Olympics since its debut in 1972 Games. The delegation included two track and field athletes: sprinter Samiya Yuusf Omar and long-distance runner Abdinasir Said Ibrahim. Neither athlete progressed past the first round of their respective competitions. Omar's story, having trained in Mogadishu during the Somali Civil War, was covered by the media at the time, and later featured in a graphic novel following her death.

== Background ==
Somalia participated in seven Summer Olympics between its debut in the 1972 Summer Olympics in Munich, West Germany, and the 2008 Summer Olympics in Beijing, China. The highest number of Somalis participating at any single Summer Games was seven at the 1984 Games in Los Angeles, United States. No Somali has ever won a medal at an Olympics.

Abdinasir Said Ibrahim was chosen to compete in the Men's 5000 metres and Samiya Yuusf Omar in the Women's 200 metres. Somali official Duran Farah was chosen as the nation's flag bearer for the Parade of Nations.

== Athletics ==
Somalia was represented by one male athlete at the 2008 Games in athletics – Abdinasir Said Ibrahim, a 5000 metres runner, an 18-year-old. He competed in the third and final heat of the first round, with a time of 14:21:58. This placed him in 12th and final place, over sixteen seconds behind Abdelaziz El Idrissi of Morocco in 11th position. However, there were two runners slower than Ibrahim in other heats; Nader al-Masri of Palestine and Soe Min Thu of Myanmar.

At the age of 16 years old, Samiya Yuusf Omar was the only female athlete competing for Somalia at the 2008 Summer Olympics. Prior to the competition, she trained at the Mogadishu Stadium on a gravel track pitted by mortar craters. She explained that she would be routinely harassed while training by local militia groups, fighting in the Somali Civil War, and both friends and family had been pressuring her to stop training. She explained, "Traditionally Somalis view the girls as corrupted if they join in with things like sports and music. It's because they sometimes wear transparent clothes or shorts. Therefore I have been coming under pressure from all different sides." She continued to practice following encouragement from her mother, although had not expected to be chosen for the Games due to her age and as she was from a minority ethnic group.

She competed in the fifth out of six heats of the women's 200 metre competition on 19 August. She finished in a time of 32.16 in eighth and last place, nine seconds behind South African Isabel Le Roux in seventh position. Having had no funding, Omar competed in loose fitting equipment donated by the Sudanese team, but despite finishing in last place, the media coverage of her meant that she was cheered loudly by the crowd as she finished.

Following the Games, she received death threats upon returning to Somalia, and after being confronted by Al-Shabaab, she began to deny that she was an athlete. The organisation banned woman from participating in sports, and Omar eventually made her way to Ethiopia in order to pursue the hope of competing in the 2012 Summer Olympics. She attempted to make her way to Europe, travelling to Libya in September 2011. Alongside other refugees, she attempted to cross the Mediterranean by sea in 2012; she drowned while attempting to board an Italian naval vessel when the boat she was on was intercepted off the coast of Libya. Omar's life story was later dramatised as the graphic novel An Olympic Dream: The story of Samia Yusuf Omar by German artist Reinhard Kleist.

Key

- Note–Ranks given for track events are within the athlete's heat only
- N/A = Round not applicable for the event

Track events

Athlete	Event	Heat		Semifinal		Final	
Athlete	Event	Time	Rank	Time	Rank	Time	Rank
Abdinasir Said Ibrahim	Men's 5000 m	14:21.58	12	—N/a		Did not advance	
Samia Yusuf Omar	Women's 200 m	32.16	8	Did not advance			
