= Somalia at the 1988 Summer Olympics =

- IOC code: SOM
- NOC: Somali Olympic Committee

in Seoul
- Competitors: 5 in 1 sport
- Flag bearer: Aboukar Hassan Adani
- Medals: Gold 0 Silver 0 Bronze 0 Total 0

Summer Olympics appearances (overview)
- 1972; 1976–1980; 1984; 1988; 1992; 1996; 2000; 2004; 2008; 2012; 2016; 2020; 2024

Somalia competed at the 1988 Summer Olympics in Seoul, South Korea.

== Competitors ==
The following is the list of number of competitors in the Games.

Sport	Men	Women	Total
Athletics	5	0	5
Total	5	0	5

== Athletics ==
Key
Note–Ranks given for track events are within the athlete's heat only
Q = Qualified for the next round
q = Qualified for the next round as a fastest loser or, in field events, by position without achieving the qualifying target
NR = National record
N/A = Round not applicable for the event
Bye = Athlete not required to compete in round

Men

Athlete	Event	First Round		Second Round		Semi Final		Final	
Athlete	Event	Result	Rank	Result	Rank	Result	Rank	Result	Rank
Ibrahim Okash	800 m	1:48.97	3 q	1:46.55	4 q	1:46.62	8	did not advance	
Jama Mohamed Aden	1500 m	3:49.84	11	n/a		did not advance			
Aboukar Hassan Adani	5000 m	14:37.98	13	n/a		did not advance			
Mohiddin Mohamed Kulmiye	marathon	n/a						2.58:10	91
Ahmed Mohamed Ismail	marathon	n/a						did not finish	
