= Somalia at the 2024 Summer Olympics =

- IOC code: SOM
- NOC: Somali Olympic Committee

in Paris, France 26 July 2024 – 11 August 2024
- Competitors: 1 in 1 sport
- Flag bearer (opening): Ali Idow Hassan
- Flag bearer (closing): Volunteer
- Medals: Gold 0 Silver 0 Bronze 0 Total 0

Summer Olympics appearances (overview)
- 1972; 1976–1980; 1984; 1988; 1992; 1996; 2000; 2004; 2008; 2012; 2016; 2020; 2024

Somalia sent a delegation to compete at the 2024 Summer Olympics in Paris from 26 July to 11 August 2024. Since the nation's debut in 1972, Somalia competed in every Summer Olympics except for three occasions: 1976, due to the Congolese-led boycott; 1980, due to the US-led boycott; and 1992, for political reasons. It was the nation's 11th appearance at the Summer Olympics.

Somalia's team consisted of one male athletics athlete, Ali Idow Hassan, and he served as the country's opening ceremony flagbearer. Ultimately, Hassan was eliminated for not starting in the repechage, failing to earn his Olympic medal as a result.

== Background ==
The Somali Olympic Committee was recognised by the International Olympic Committee in 1972. The nation debuted that year in the 1972 Summer Olympics. Somalia participated in an African boycott over New Zealand's participation at the 1976 Summer Olympics, and joined a United States-led boycott of the 1980 Moscow Olympics over the Soviet invasion of Afghanistan. It did not compete again until the 1984 Summer Olympics. Somalia forwent the 1992 Summer Olympics, possibly because of the ongoing famine affecting the country, though it participated in the opening ceremony.

Somalia took part in the 2024 Summer Olympics in Paris from 26 July to 11 August 2024. It was their 11th appearance at a Summer Olympic Games. The delegation consisted of one male athletics athlete, Ali Idow Hassan. Hassan was the flag bearer for the opening ceremony, and a volunteer carried the flag for the closing ceremony.

== Competitors ==
The following is the list of number of competitors in the Games.

Sport	Men	Women	Total
Athletics	1	0	1
Total	1	0	1

== Athletics ==
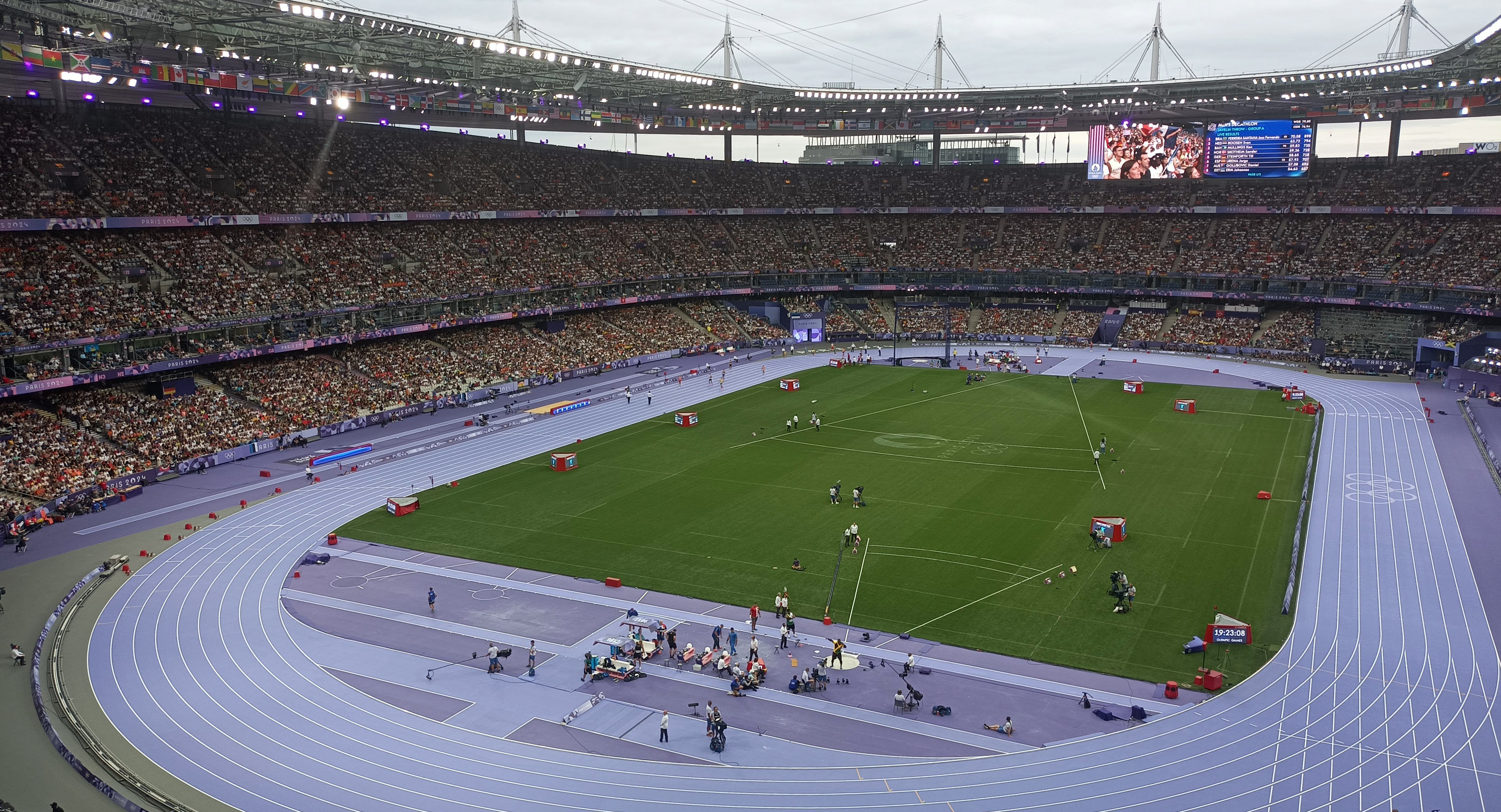
Stade de France, where the athletics events were held

Somalia received one wild card for a middle-distance runner to compete at the 2024 Summer Olympics, and Ali Idow Hassan was selected by the Somali Olympic Committee. Hassan was 26 years old at the time of the Paris Games. He was competing in his second Olympic Games after the 2020 Summer Olympics. Before the competition, Hassan told the media that he was happy for representing the country but sad when he was alone, being the only representative from his nation. The Somali Olympic Committee was criticized for excluding Abdullahi Jama Mahamed, who had secured Somalia's first global athletics medal in over 35 years with a silver in the 5000 metres at the 2023 African Games.

On 7 August, Hassan participated in the first round heats of the men's 800 metres in Stade de France. Drawn to the second heat, Hassan finished the race in a time of 1 minute and 48.72 seconds, placed eighth out of nine runners in his heat. As only the first three runners in each heat advanced to the semi-finals, Hassan was placed into the repechage. On 8 August, Hassan was assigned to third heat of the repechage. He did not start (DNS) the repechage, and was therefore eliminated. Eventually, the gold was won by Emmanuel Wanyonyi from Kenya, silver by Marco Arop from Canada, and bronze by Djamel Sedjati from Algeria.

Track events

Athlete	Event	Heat		Repechage		Semifinal	Final			Ref.
Athlete	Event	Result	Rank	Result	Rank	Result	Result	Rank	Rank	Ref.
Ali Idow Hassan	Men's 800 m	1.48:72	8	DNS		Did not advance				

== See also ==
- Somalia at the 2023 African Games
