= Jamale =

Jamale is a masculine given name. Notable people with the name include:

- Jamale Aarrass (born 1981), French middle-distance runner
- Jamale Pringle, Antiguan politician
