= Somalia at the 2020 Summer Olympics =

- IOC code: SOM
- NOC: Somali Olympic Committee
- Website: www.nocsom.org

in Tokyo July 23, 2021 – August 8, 2021
- Competitors: 2 in 2 sports
- Flag bearers (opening): Ramla Ali; Ali Idow Hassan
- Flag bearer (closing): N/A
- Medals: Gold 0 Silver 0 Bronze 0 Total 0

Summer Olympics appearances (overview)
- 1972; 1976–1980; 1984; 1988; 1992; 1996; 2000; 2004; 2008; 2012; 2016; 2020; 2024; 2028

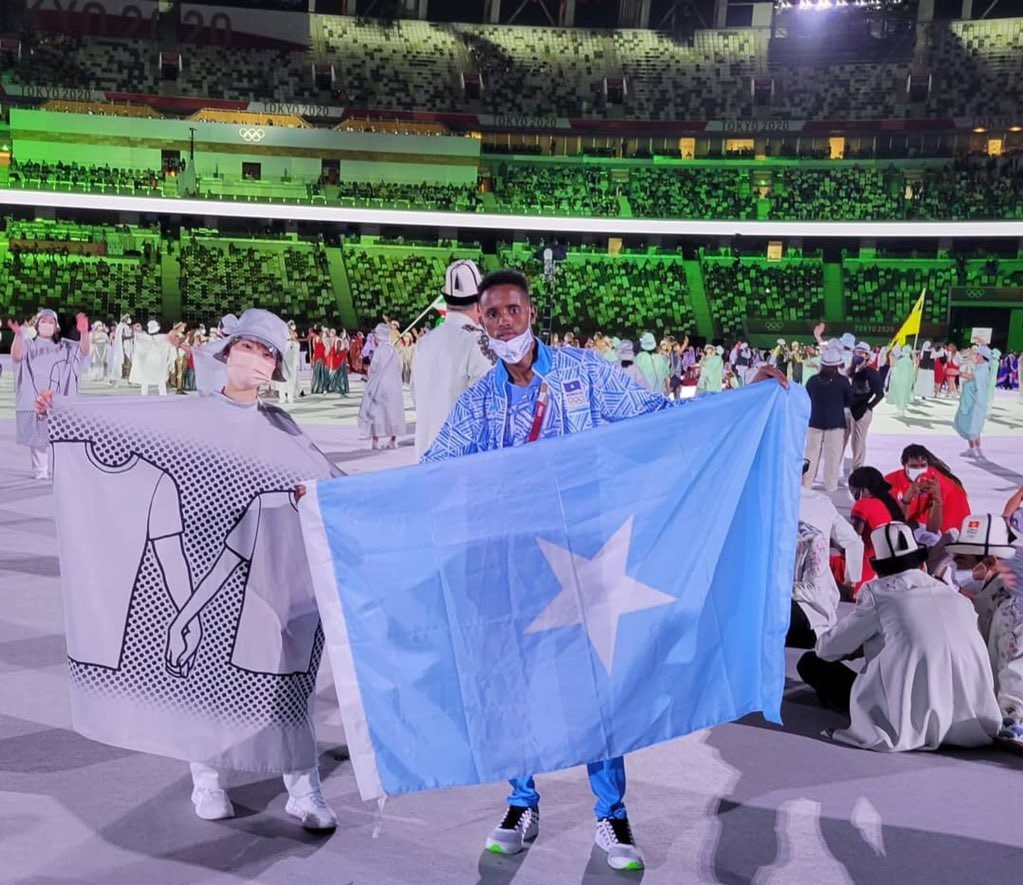
Ali Idow Hassan holding the Flag of Somalia at the 2020 Summer Olympics opening ceremony

Somalia sent a delegation to compete at the 2020 Summer Olympics in Tokyo. Originally scheduled to take place from 24 July to 9 August 2020, the Games were then postponed to 23 July to 8 August 2021, due to the COVID-19 pandemic. It was the nation's tenth appearance at the Summer Olympics since its debut in 1972, only missing for three occasions.

Somalia's team consisted of one male athletics athlete, Ali Idow Hassan, and one female boxing athlete, Ramla Ali. Both of them served as the country's opening ceremony flagbearer. Both of them were eliminated in their first round of competition. This was the first time Somalia participated in a non-athletic sport in the Olympics.

== Background ==
Somalia first competed in the Summer Olympic Games in 1972, and have participated in most of the Summer Olympics since, excluding three occasions: 1976, due to the Congolese-led boycott; 1980, due to the US-led boycott; and 1992, for political reasons. The 2020 Summer Olympics was their 10th appearance at a Summer Olympic Games.

The 2020 Summer Olympics were originally scheduled to take place from 24 July to 9 August 2020; however, the Games were postponed because of the COVID-19 pandemic and they ended up taking place from 23 July to 8 August 2021. Somalia sent a delegation of two athletes; Ramla Ali and Ali Idow Hassan. They served as the team's flagbearers in the opening ceremony, while there were not any athletes representing Somalia present for the closing ceremony since athletes had to leave Japan within 48 hours from completion of their final event due to COVID-19 related protocols. Ramla Ali, who competed in boxing, became the first non-runner representing Somalia in the Olympics.

== Competitors ==
The following is the list of number of competitors from Somalia participating at the Games per sport/discipline.

Sport	Men	Women	Total
Athletics	1	0	1
Boxing	0	1	1
Total	1	1	2

== Athletics ==
Ali Idow Hassan was 23 years old at the time of Tokyo Olympics. On 3 August, he participated in the first round of heats of the men's 1500 metres in Japan National Stadium. Drawn to the second group of the heat, Hassan finished the race in a time of 3 minutes and 43.96 seconds, coming 10th place out of 16 runners in his heat. As only the first six athletes from each heat and the next six fastest would advance to the semi-finals, Hassan was eliminated in the first round. Original 8th place finisher Sadik Mikhou was later disqualified on 8 August for blood doping after an out-of-competition test produced an abnormal result. Hassan was then placed 9th out of 16 in his heat, and was ranked 35 out of 47 participating athletes overall in the heat. Eventually, the gold was won by Jakob Ingebrigtsen from Norway, silver by Timothy Cheruiyot from Kenya, and Josh Kerr from Great Britain.

At the 2024 Paris Olympics, Hassan would represent the country again, participating in the men's 800 metres.

Key

- PB – personal best (the best mark achieved by an athlete on a personal level)

Track & road events

Athlete	Event	Heat		Semifinal		Final		Ref.
Athlete	Event	Result	Rank	Result	Rank	Result	Rank	Ref.
Ali Idow Hassan	Men's 1500 m	3:43.96 PB	10	Did not advance				

== Boxing ==
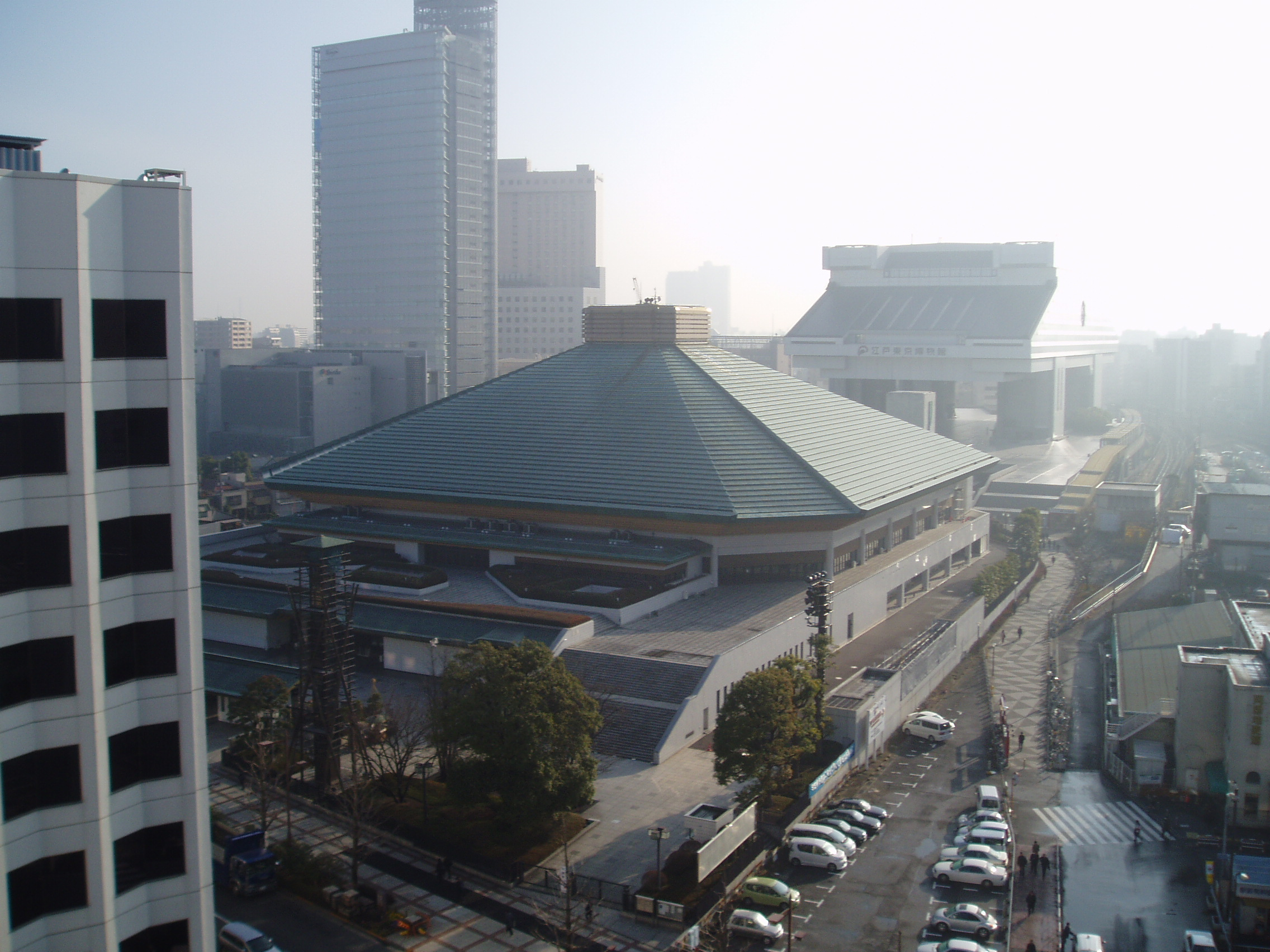
Ryōgoku Kokugikan, where the boxing events were held

Somalia received an invitation from the Tripartite Commission to send featherweight boxer Ramla Ali. Ali was 31 years old at the time of Tokyo Olympics. She was the first boxer ever to represent Somalia on the Olympic stage. On 24 July, she received a bye in the first round, advancing to the second round. On 26 July, she faced Claudia Nechita from Romania, who also received a bye in the first round. All 5 judges gave the same score of 30–27 in favor of Nechita. As a result, Ali lost to Nechita by unanimous decision (0–5), eliminated in the round of 16. The gold was won by Sena Irie from Japan, silver by Nesthy Petecio from the Philippines and bronze by Karriss Artingstall from Great Britain and Irma Testa from Italy.

In an interview, Ali revealed that she did not receive any funding for competing for Somalia and she needed to work as a model to pay her way to the Olympics. In 2018, Ali launched The Sisters Club, a charitable initiative created to provide spaces for Muslim women and minorities to learn and enjoy boxing in the U.K.

Athlete	Event	Round of 32	Round of 16	Quarterfinals	Semifinals	Final		Ref.
Athlete	Event	Opposition Result	Opposition Result	Opposition Result	Opposition Result	Opposition Result	Rank	Ref.
Ramla Ali	Women's featherweight	Bye	Nechita (ROU); L 0–5	Did not advance				
