= Ramla Ali =

Somali boxer, model and filmmaker (born 1989)

- Ali in tears as she became unified WBO and IBF world champion 2026
- Born: 16 September 1989 (age 37); Mogadishu, Somalia
- Occupations: Boxer; model; filmmaker; campaign activist
Ramla Ali
- Modeling information
- Hair color: Black
- Eye color: Dark Brown
- Boxing career
- Height: 5 ft 7 in (170 cm)
- Weight: Super-bantamweight
- Stance: Orthodox

Boxing record
- Total fights: 14
- Wins: 12
- Win by KO: 3
- Losses: 2

Ramla Said Ahmed Ali (born 16 September 1989) is a Somali professional boxer, model, filmmaker and campaign activist. She is the first professional boxing world champion from Somalia, holding the unified WBO and IBF female super-bantamweight titles since November 2026. As an amateur, Ali was the first boxer to compete at the Olympic Games for Somalia, and the first to win an international gold medal for the country in boxing. Since 2026 she has also worked as a director, writer and producer through 786 Films, the independent production company she runs with her husband, filmmaker Richard Moore.

== Boxing ==
=== Amateur career ===
As an amateur, Ali won the 2015 Novice national championships in England, the 2016 England Boxing Elite National Championships, the 2016 Great British Championships, and the 2019 African Zone featherweight title.

Ali initially represented England but, in 2018, changed to represent Somalia. She has not returned to Somalia since leaving as a child but wanted to help put the country in the headlines for positive reasons. She became the first boxer to win an international gold medal while representing Somalia. Later, in 2021, she competed in the women's featherweight event at the 2020 Summer Olympics. Although she lost her first fight, she became the first boxer to represent Somalia on the Olympic stage.

=== Professional career ===
Becoming the first Somali female professional boxer, Ali turned professional in 2020 with the stated aim of becoming Somalia's first world champion. She made her pro-debut by securing a points win against Eva Hubmayer over six rounds at Wembley Arena in London on 31 October 2020.

On 20 August 2022, she defeated Dominican boxer Crystal Garcia Nova by first round knockout in the first professional women's boxing match held in Saudi Arabia, on the undercard of the Anthony Joshua–Oleksandr Usyk rematch in Jeddah; Ali described herself and Garcia Nova as the first women in history to box professionally in the country.

She won her first professional championship when she defeated Avril Mathie by unanimous decision for the vacant IBF Intercontinental female super-bantamweight title at Hulu Theater in New York City, United States, on 4 February 2023. Ali lost the title in her first defense, suffering an eighth round knockout against Julissa Guzman at Smoothie King Center in New Orleans, Louisiana, United States on 17 June 2023. A rematch took place at Casino de Monte-Carlo in Monaco on 4 November 2023, with Ali winning via unanimous decision to claim the WBA International female super-bantamweight title.

Ali challenged WBC female super-bantamweight champion Yamileth Mercado at Footprint Center, Phoenix, Arizona, United States, on 29 June 2024, losing by unanimous decision.

On 26 March 2025, it was announced that Ali had signed with Most Valuable Promotions.

On 8 November 2026, Ali faced the previously unbeaten Mikiah Kreps for the vacant IBF and WBO female super-bantamweight titles at College Park Center in Arlington, Texas, United States, on a Most Valuable Promotions card broadcast on ESPN. Ali knocked Kreps down with a right hand in the third round, the only knockdown of the bout. She won by split decision with two of the ringside judges scoring the fight 97–92 and 96–93 respectively in her favour, while the third had it a 98–91 for her opponent. Ali's win made her Somalia’s first professional boxing world champion.

== Fashion and style ==
Alongside boxing, Ali has built a parallel profile in fashion, and has spoken about deliberately bringing the two together rather than treating them as separate identities. She has said she approaches creative directors directly to design one-off fight kits for her to wear into the ring, describing herself as the first boxer to have a major fashion house design her ring attire. Kits designed for her include pieces by Maria Grazia Chiuri at Dior — the first designer to create one for her — Ib Kamara at Off-White (continuing the house's relationship with her that began under Virgil Abloh), Sarah Burton at Alexander McQueen, Daniel Lee at Burberry, Donatella Versace at Versace, and Pierpaolo Piccioli at Balenciaga. Her Versace kit was among the last pieces Donatella Versace designed before stepping down as the house's creative director in 2025 after nearly three decades at its helm. She has said each kit is built around a recurring motif, a panther, drawn from Somalia's coat of arms. Ali has also been a brand ambassador for Cartier and Dior. Alongside her 2019 British Vogue cover, she has appeared on the covers of Elle UK, Harper's Bazaar Arabia, Dazed, Grazia UK, The Wall Street Journal, Financial Times's How To Spend It magazine, and the Evening Standard's ES Magazine. She has also been the subject of a cover story for Arabian Business's T Magazine and a Marie Claire UK digital cover.

== Writing ==
Ali's debut book Not Without A Fight is a self-help book based on ten of the most important fights in her life. It was published by Merky Books & Penguin Random House. It has also been announced that Academy Award nominated, BAFTA winning producer Lee Magiday will be making a feature-length drama in collaboration with Film4 based on the life story of Ramla Ali.

Her book was published by Merky Books in September 2021, structured around ten pivotal "fights" — both literal bouts and personal challenges — that shaped her life.

== Filmmaking ==
Ali and her husband, writer-director Richard Moore, run the independent production company 786 Films. Their directorial debut, the short film How to Hide It, follows a young Muslim woman, played by Ali, who reluctantly buys a lottery ticket, wins the EuroMillions jackpot, and faces a spiritual and moral reckoning as a result. Ali and Moore co-wrote and co-directed the film, which was executive produced by Idris Elba and Sabrina Elba. It has screened at over 36 international film festivals including HollyShorts, Palm Springs ShortFest, Sydney International Film Festival and the Minneapolis–St. Paul International Film Festival, where it was included in the East African showcase "What We Carry".

Ali and Moore have served as executive producers on In the Shadows since the film was first set up, and remained attached throughout its seven years in development. The biographical feature, based on Ali's life and produced by Lee Magiday and Madeleine Sanderson for Film4, is now in production with Jasmine Jobson cast as Ali; Finn Cole also stars.

Ali and Moore's debut feature, Not Like Us, was an independently financed British romantic comedy shot on location in East London, starring Sabrina Elba as Amina Hassan, and Edmund Clarke, played by Ashley Thomas; Sofia Oxenham also stars. Ali and Moore co-wrote and co-directed the film, drawing on their own experience as an intercultural couple; production wrapped in July 2026.

== Campaigning and advocacy ==
Ali helped set up Somalia's boxing federation in Mogadishu and became the first boxer to have represented Somalia in the Women's World Championships, held in New Delhi, India.

In January 2018, Ali launched The Sisters Club, a charitable initiative created to provide spaces for Muslim women and minorities to learn and enjoy boxing in the U.K. Subsequently, the initiative expanded to also welcome women who have experienced sexual assault or domestic violence to learn self-defence. The charity partnered with brands Nike, Sports Direct & Everlast to expand its program in 2021, enabling it to reach more women across the country.

Ali committed to giving 25 percent of her first year's earnings as a professional to Black Lives Matter charities.

== Personal life ==
Ali moved to England from Somalia as a refugee from the Somali Civil War. When Ali was a toddler, her brother was killed at the age of 12 by a mortar when playing outside, prompting the family to leave for the UK via Kenya. She started boxing as a teenager in an effort to lose weight.

Ali is married to filmmaker Richard Moore, with whom she co-founded 786 Films.

== Honours ==
Ali was one of the fifteen women selected to appear on the cover of the September 2019 issue of British Vogue by guest editor Meghan, Duchess of Sussex. In 2023, she was selected as one of the twelve Time's Woman of The Year. In 2025, President Hassan Sheikh Mohamud awarded Ali with Certificate of Honor for her achievements and efforts in representing Somalia in global sports. She was also awarded the Medal of Honor by the Governor of Banadir Region and Mayor of Mogadishu, Hassan Mohamed Hussein in recognition of her groundbreaking achievements on the global stage and being an "inspiration to Somali youth particularly young women".

== Filmography ==
Year	Title	Role	Notes
2026	How to Hide It	Lead actress; co-director; co-writer	Short film; 786 Films; screened at over 36 festivals including HollyShorts and Minneapolis–St. Paul International Film Festival
TBA	In the Shadows	Herself (subject); executive producer since inception	Biographical feature; Film4; Jasmine Jobson stars as Ali
TBA (2027)	Not Like Us	Co-writer; co-director; executive producer	Feature romantic comedy; 786 Films; stars Sabrina Elba and Ashley Thomas

== Professional boxing record ==
14 fights	12 wins	2 losses
By knockout	3	1
By decision	9	1

No.	Result	Record	Opponent	Type	Round, time	Date	Location	Notes
14	Win	12–2	Mikiah Kreps	SD	10	8 Nov 2026	College Park Center, Arlington, Texas, U.S.	Won vacant IBF and WBO female super-bantamweight titles
13	Win	11–2	Monika Singh	KO	1 (8)	14 Feb 2026	Westin Hotel Ballroom, Dubai Marina, Dubai	
12	Win	10–2	Lila Furtado	UD	8	11 Jul 2025	Madison Square Garden, New York City, New York, U.S.	
11	Loss	9–2	Yamileth Mercado	UD	10	29 Jun 2024	Footprint Center, Phoenix, Arizona, U.S.	For WBC female super-bantamweight title
10	Win	9–1	Julissa Guzman	UD	10	4 Nov 2023	Casino de Monte-Carlo, Monaco	Won WBA International female super-bantamweight title
9	Loss	8–1	Julissa Guzman	KO	8 (10), 0:42	17 Jun 2023	Smoothie King Center, New Orleans, Louisiana, US	Lost IBF Intercontinental female super-bantamweight title
8	Win	8–0	Avril Mathie	UD	10	4 Feb 2023	Hulu Theater, New York City, New York, US	Won vacant IBF Intercontinental female super-bantamweight title
7	Win	7–0	Crystal Garcia Nova	KO	1 (8), 1:05	20 Aug 2022	King Abdullah Sports City, Jeddah, Saudi Arabia	
6	Win	6–0	Augustina Rojas	PTS	8	9 Jul 2022	The O2 Arena, London, England	
5	Win	5–0	Shelly Barnett	KO	2 (8), 2:33	19 Mar 2022	Galen Center, Los Angeles, California, US	
4	Win	4–0	Isela Vera	UD	6	27 Nov 2021	Hulu Theater, New York City, New York, US	
3	Win	3–0	Mikayla Nebel	UD	6	29 May 2021	Michelob Ultra Arena, Paradise, Nevada, US	
2	Win	2–0	Bec Connolly	PTS	6	20 Mar 2021	Wembley Arena, London, England	
1	Win	1–0	Eva Hubmayer	PTS	6	31 Oct 2020	Wembley Arena, London, England	

Olympic Games
Preceded by Mohamed Daud Mohamed	Flag bearer for Somalia; Tokyo 2020 with Ali Idow Hassan	Succeeded by Ali Idow Hassan
