= Fowzia Jilalow =

Personal information
- Born: 1968 (age 57–58) Mogadishu, Somalia

Sport
- Country: Somalia
- Sport: Athletics
- Events: 200 metres, 400 metres

Fowzia Jilalow, also spelled Fowizia Ibrahim Jilaow, is a Somalain former sprinter who represented Somalia in the women's events during the 1980s.

Jilalow is the female Somali national record holder in the 200 metres and the 4 × 400 metres relay. When combining her feats in terms of Somali national records in athletics and being the only Somali woman to advance to elimination rounds in a multi-national elite sprinting event, Jilalow is the most accomplished female track athlete that Somalia has produced.

== Personal bests ==
Outdoor

- 200 metres – 28.43 (Athens, Greece; 18 July 1986)
