= Athletics at the 2008 Summer Olympics – Men's 5000 metres =

Men's 5000 metres at the Games of the XXIX Olympiad
- Venue: Beijing National Stadium
- Dates: August 20 (heats); August 23 (final)
- Competitors: 43 from 25 nations

Medalists
1st place, gold medalist(s)		Kenenisa Bekele	Ethiopia
2nd place, silver medalist(s)		Eliud Kipchoge	Kenya
3rd place, bronze medalist(s)		Edwin Cheruiyot Soi	Kenya

The Men's 5000 metres at the 2008 Summer Olympics took place on 20 and 23 August at the Beijing National Stadium. The winning margin was 4.98 seconds.

The qualifying standards were 13:21.50 (A standard) and 13:28.00 (B standard).

== Records ==
Prior to this competition, the existing world record, Olympic record, and world leading time were as follows:

World record	Kenenisa Bekele (ETH)	12:37.35	Hengelo, Netherlands	31 May 2004
Olympic record	Saïd Aouita (MAR)	13:05.59	Los Angeles, United States	11 August 1984
World Leading	Moses Masai (KEN)	12:50.55	Berlin, Germany	1 June 2008

The following new Olympic record was set during this competition:

Date	Event	Athlete	Time	Notes
23 August 2008	Final	Kenenisa Bekele (ETH)	12:57.82	OR

== Results ==
=== Heat 1 ===
Qualification: First 4 in each heat(Q) and the next 3 fastest(q) advance to the Final.

To sort this table by heat, athlete, or any other column, click on the icon next to the column title.

Rank	Athlete	Nationality	Time	Notes
1	Matthew Tegenkamp	United States	13:37.36	Q
2	Eliud Kipchoge	Kenya	13:37.50	Q
3	Tariku Bekele	Ethiopia	13:37.63	Q
4	Kidane Tadasse	Eritrea	13:37.72	Q
5	Alemayehu Bezabeh	Spain	13:37.88	q
6	Alistair Ian Cragg	Ireland	13:38.57	q
7	Juan Luis Barrios	Mexico	13:42.39	q
8	Anis Selmouni	Morocco	13:43.70	
9	Aadam Ismaeel Khamis	Bahrain	13:44.76	
10	Collis Birmingham	Australia	13:44.90	
11	Geofrey Kusuro	Uganda	13:50.50	
12	Sultan Khamis Zaman	Qatar	13:53.38	
13	Takayuki Matsumiya	Japan	14:20.24	
14	Soe Min Thu	Myanmar	15:50.56	

=== Heat 2 ===
Rank	Athlete	Nationality	Time	Notes
1	Edwin Cheruiyot Soi	Kenya	13:46.41	Q
2	Moses Ndiema Kipsiro	Uganda	13:46.58	Q
3	Abreham Cherkos	Ethiopia	13:47.60	Q
4	Jesús España	Spain	13:48.88	Q
5	Ali Abdalla	Eritrea	13:49.68	
6	Mo Farah	Great Britain	13:50.95	
7	Adrian Blincoe	New Zealand	13:55.27	
8	Mourad Marofit	Morocco	14:00.76	
9	Ian Dobson	United States	14:05.47	
10	Tonny Wamulwa	Zambia	14:06.96	
11	Kevin Sullivan	Canada	14:09.16	
12	Ali Saïdi-Sief	Algeria	14:15.00	
13	Nader Almassri	Palestine	14:41.10	
	Rashid Ramzi	Bahrain	DNS	

=== Heat 3 ===
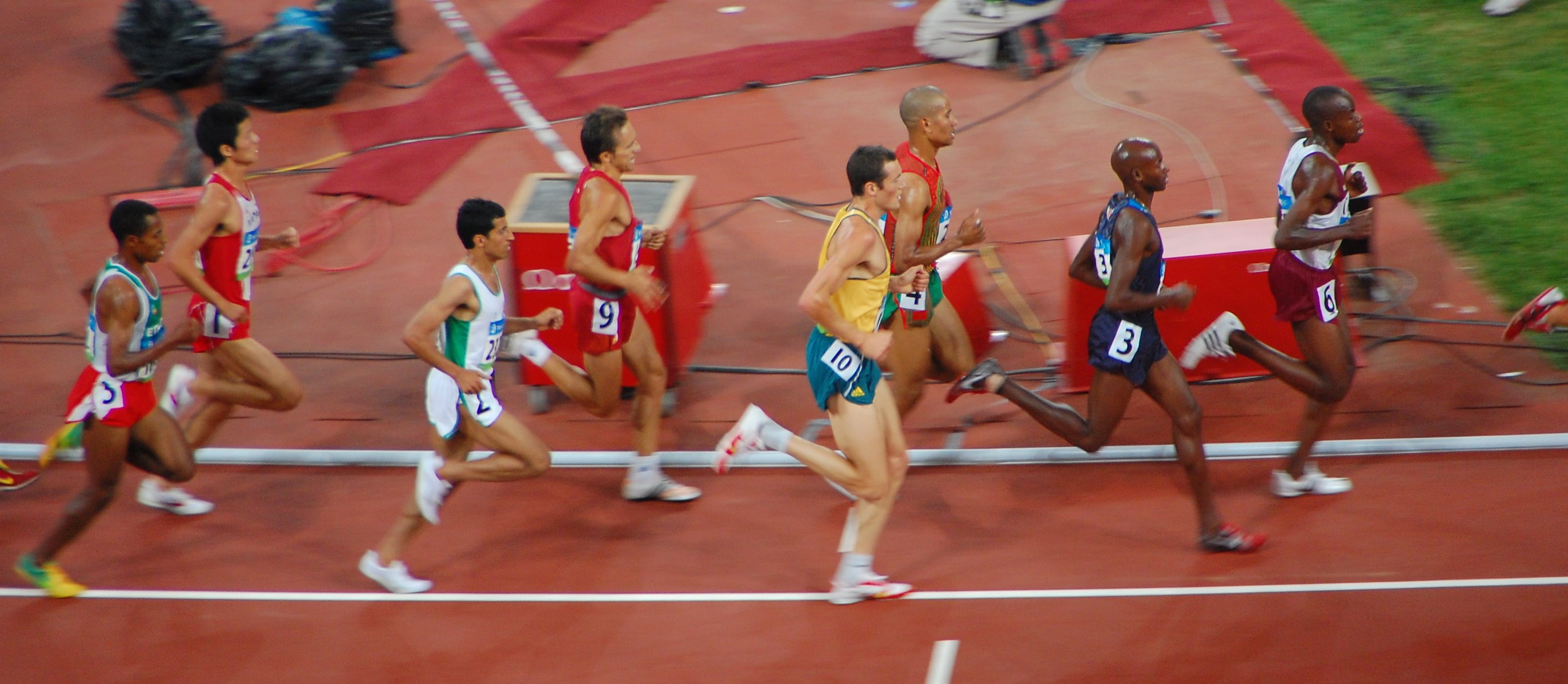
2008 Summer Olympics - Men's 5000m Round 1 - Heat 3

Rank	Athlete	Nationality	Time	Notes
1	Bernard Lagat	United States	13:39.70	Q
2	James Kwalia C'Kurui	Qatar	13:39.96	Q
3	Kenenisa Bekele	Ethiopia	13:40.13	Q
4	Thomas Pkemei Longosiwa	Kenya	13:41.30	Q
5	Craig Mottram	Australia	13:44.39	
6	Moukheld Al-Outaibi	Saudi Arabia	13:47.00	
7	Kensuke Takezawa	Japan	13:49.42	SB
8	Monder Rizki	Belgium	13:54.41	
9	Alberto García	Spain	13:58.20	
10	Philippe Bandi	Switzerland	13:59.68	
11	Abdelaziz Ennaji El Idrissi	Morocco	14:05.30	
12	Abdinasir Said Ibrahim	Somalia	14:21.58	
	Selim Bayrak	Turkey	DNS	
	Hasan Mahboob	Bahrain	DNS	
	David Galván	Mexico	DNS	

=== Final ===
23 August 2008 - 20:10

Rank	Athlete	Country	Time	Notes
1st place, gold medalist(s)	Kenenisa Bekele	Ethiopia	12:57.82	OR
2nd place, silver medalist(s)	Eliud Kipchoge	Kenya	13:02.80	
3rd place, bronze medalist(s)	Edwin Cheruiyot Soi	Kenya	13:06.22	SB
4	Moses Ndiema Kipsiro	Uganda	13:10.56	
5	Abreham Cherkos	Ethiopia	13:16.46	
6	Tariku Bekele	Ethiopia	13:19.06	
7	Juan Luis Barrios	Mexico	13:19.79	SB
8	James Kwalia C'Kurui	Qatar	13:23.48	
9	Bernard Lagat	United States	13:26.89	
10	Kidane Tadasse	Eritrea	13:28.40	
11	Alemayehu Bezabeh	Spain	13:30.48	
12	Thomas Pkemei Longosiwa	Kenya	13:31.34	
13	Matthew Tegenkamp	United States	13:33.13	
14	Jesús España	Spain	13:55.94	
	Alistair Cragg	Ireland	DNF	

=== Splits ===
Intermediate	Athlete	Country	Mark
1000m	Tariku Bekele	Ethiopia	2:45.49
2000m	Tariku Bekele	Ethiopia	5:22.29
3000m	Kenenisa Bekele	Ethiopia	8:00.85
4000m	Kenenisa Bekele	Ethiopia	10:32.52
