= Fartun Abukar Omar =

Somali athlete

Fartun Abukar Omar (born August 3, 1986) is a Somali athlete.

== Biography ==
She represented Somalia at the 2004 Summer Olympics in Athens, despite her country having been without a government for thirteen years at that time. She took part in the women's 100 metres race, and finished last in her heat, nonetheless achieving a personal best of 14.29 seconds. She was 18 at the time of the event. ESPN noted that she was the first Muslim woman ever to represent Somalia at any Olympic Games.
