= Zamzam Mohamed Farah =

Personal information
- Born: March 19, 1991 (age 35) Mogadishu, Somalia

Sport
- Country: Somalia
- Sport: Athletics
- Event: 400m

Zamzam Mohamed Farah (born 19 March 1991) is a Somali female athlete from Mogadishu who competes in the Women's 400m. She was one of only two Somali athletes at the 2012 Summer Olympics.

== Early life ==
Farah was inspired by Mo Farah, a British Somali athlete to take up running. She competed in the London 2012 Olympics at the age of 18 years where she participated in the 400m. She also was the flag bearer at the 2012 Summer Olympics.

The facilities she trained in lacked proper equipment. In order to prepare for the Olympics, she and her teammates trained outside where they at times dodged bullets. Their running route was called "the road of death."

Zamzam ran the 400m heats in a time of 1:20.48 seconds, about 30 seconds behind the winner of her heats. She finished the race as the slowest athlete in the first round, she ended up 45th out of a standing of 49 only ahead of people who did not start, did not finish and ahead of people who were disqualified. She was fasting while she competed in London.

At the 2012 Summer Olympics she received several death threats through Facebook and other communication outlets for exposing herself. Although the threats were worrisome she did not apply for asylum as some news outlets were reporting. Farah still trains and hopes to compete in the next summer Olympics.

Farah's initiative in competing at the London Olympics was not about winning but delivering a message to the world that regardless of what is happening in Somalia it is still alive. Also, her presence at the Olympics was empowering to other women especially Somali women.

== Quotes ==
"The most important thing is being able to carry the Somali flag with 203 other countries in the Olympics. That in itself is success."

"Somalia is not dead. It's alive."

"I am not going there to win, but for pride...I will be representing my flag, my soil and its people."

Olympic Games
Preceded by Duran Farah	Flag bearer for Somalia; 2012 London	Succeeded by Mohamed Daud Mohamed
