= Somalia at the 2004 Summer Olympics =

- IOC code: SOM
- NOC: Somali Olympic Committee
- Website: www.nocsom.org

in Athens
- Competitors: 2 in 1 sport
- Flag bearer: Mohamed Ahmed Alim (head coach)
- Medals: Gold 0 Silver 0 Bronze 0 Total 0

Summer Olympics appearances (overview)
- 1972; 1976–1980; 1984; 1988; 1992; 1996; 2000; 2004; 2008; 2012; 2016; 2020; 2024

Somalia competed at the 2004 Summer Olympics in Athens, Greece, from 13 to 29 August 2004. Since the civil war that broke out in the early 1990s, the Somali Olympic Committee has been supported by various factions centered on the capital of Mogadishu.

Somalia's two athletes were Fartun Abukar Omar, who finished last in her qualifying heat in the women's 100 meter sprint, and Abdulla Mohamed Hussein who finished with the slowest time of all runners in the qualifying for the men's 400 meters. Many Somali's also followed the progress of American runner Abdihakem Abdirahman who was born in Somalia but left that country at age 13. He finished twelfth in the 10,000 metre race.

The Somali participation was also marked by controversy when the International Olympic Committee banned Farah W. Addo, the president of the Somali Olympic Committee from attending the Games. Addo had earlier been expelled from FIFA for embezzling millions of dollars meant to go the Somali soccer program. After complaints from FIFA, the IOC elected to ban Addo.

== Athletics ==
Somali athletes have so far achieved qualifying standards in the following athletics events (up to a maximum of 3 athletes in each event at the 'A' Standard, and 1 at the 'B' Standard).

Men

| Athlete | Event | Heat | | Semifinal | | Final | |
| Athlete | Event | Result | Rank | Result | Rank | Result | Rank |
|---|---|---|---|---|---|---|---|
| Abdulla Mohamed Hussein | 400 m | 51.52 | 8 | did not advance | | | |

Women

| Athlete | Event | Heat | | Quarterfinal | | Semifinal | | Final | |
| Athlete | Event | Result | Rank | Result | Rank | Result | Rank | Result | Rank |
|---|---|---|---|---|---|---|---|---|---|
| Fartun Abukar Omar | 100 m | 14.29 | 8 | did not advance | | | | | |

Key

- Note–Ranks given for track events are within the athlete's heat only
- Q = Qualified for the next round
- q = Qualified for the next round as a fastest loser or, in field events, by position without achieving the qualifying target
- NR = National record
- N/A = Round not applicable for the event
- Bye = Athlete not required to compete in round
