= Abdelaziz El Idrissi =

Moroccan long-distance runner

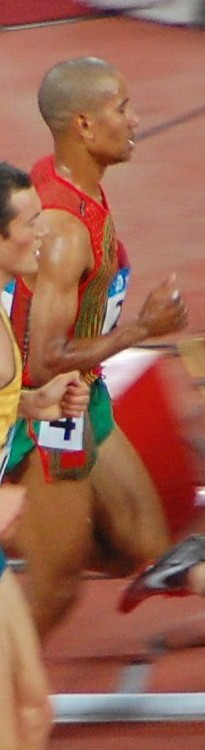
- Abdelaziz El Idrissi Ennaji (2008 Summer Olympics)

Personal information
- Full name: Abdelaziz Ennaji El-Idrissi
- Nationality: Morocco
- Born: 8 December 1986 (age 39) Ouled Mrah, Souss-Massa, Morocco

Sport
- Sport: Athletics
- Event: Long-distance running

Achievements and titles
- Personal best: 5000 m: 13:06.81 (2008)

Abdelaziz Ennaji El-Idrissi (Arabic: عبد العزيز الناجي الإدريسي; born 8 December 1986 in Ouled Mrah, Souss-Massa) is a Moroccan long-distance runner. He set his personal best time of 13:06.81 in the men's 5,000 metres at the KBC Night of Athletics in Heusden-Zolder, Belgium.

El Idrissi represented Morocco at the 2008 Summer Olympics in Beijing, where he competed for the men's 5,000 metres. He ran in the third heat against fourteen other athletes, including United States' Bernard Lagat, and Ethiopia's Kenenisa Bekele, both of whom were heavy favorites in this event. He finished the race in eleventh place by six seconds behind Switzerland's Philippe Bandi, with a time of 14:05.30. El Idrissi, however, failed to advance into the final, as he placed thirty-first overall, and was ranked farther below four mandatory slots for the next round. At the end of September, 2014, he was arrested after having stolen a smartphone to a biker in Genova, Italy.
