= 2011 French Indoor Athletics Championships =

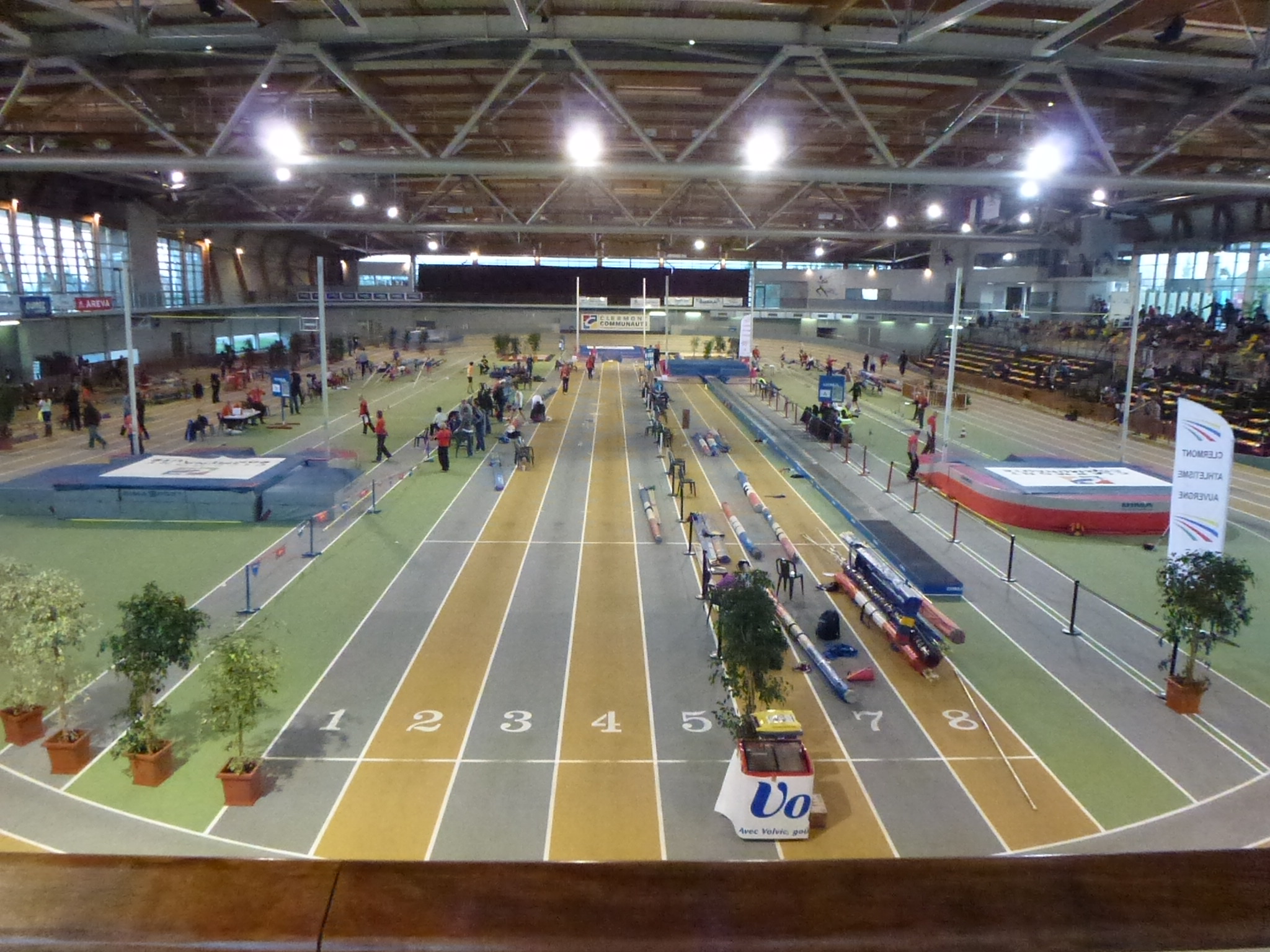
- The host stadium
- Edition: 40th
- Dates: 19–20 February
- Host city: Aubière
- Venue: Jean-Pellez Stadium
- Events: 26

The 2011 French Indoor Athletics Championships was the 40th edition of the national championship in indoor track and field for France, organised by the French Athletics Federation. It was held on 19–20 February at the Jean-Pellez Stadium in Aubière. A total of 26 events (divided evenly between the sexes) were contested over the two-day competition.

Teddy Tamgho improved his own world indoor record with a jump to 17.91 m while 16-year-old Guy-Elphège Anouman set a world indoor best for a youth athlete with 21.13 seconds for the 200 metres.

== Results ==
=== Men ===
Event	Gold		Silver		Bronze	
60 metres	Christophe Lemaitre	6.58	Martial Mbandjock	6.66	Ronald Pognon	6.70
200 metres	Guy-Elphège Anouman	21.13 WYB	Toumany Coulibaly	21.45	Patrice Maurice	21.70
400 metres	Leslie Djhone	46.13	Yoann Décimus	46.31 PB	Ansoumane Fofana	46.71 PB
800 metres	Jeff Lastennet	1:48.49	Hamid Oualich	1:48.81	Samir Dahmani	1:49.17
1500 metres	Jamel Ahrass	3:46.31	Nordine Gezzar	3:46.54	Olivier Galon	3:48.54
60 m hurdles	Dimitri Bascou	7.52 PB	Samuel Coco-Viloin	7.68	Cédric Lavanne	7.75
5000 m walk	Antonin Boyez	19:47.86	Hatem Ghoula (TUN)	20:05.95 AR	Emmanuel Boulay	20:54.35
High jump	Fabrice Saint-Jean	2.23 m	Mickaël Hanany	2.23 m	Abdelaziz Namaoui	2.20 m
Pole vault	Renaud Lavillenie	5.85 m	Romain Mesnil	5.80 m	Damiel Dossévi	5.55 m
Long jump	Salim Sdiri	8.06 m	Ndiss Kaba Badji	7.91 m	Nicolas Gomont	7.86 m PB
Triple jump	Teddy Tamgho	17.91 m WR	Yoann Rapinier	17.02 m PB	Karl Taillepierre	16.92 m
Shot put	Gaëtan Bucki	19.83 m	Tumatai Dauphin	18.69 m	Jean-Luc Mastromauro	17.54 m
Heptathlon	Gaël Querin	5923 pts PB	Jérémy Lelièvre	5670 pts PB	Franck Logel	5632 pts

=== Women ===
Event	Gold		Silver		Bronze	
60 metres	Myriam Soumaré	7.19	Véronique Mang	7.23	Ayodelé Ikuesan	7.32
200 metres	Émilie Gaydu	23.39 PB	Nelly Banco	23.47 PB	Johanna Danois	23.78 PB
400 metres	Muriel Hurtis-Houairi	53.67 PB	Marie Gayot	53.91	Virginie Michanol	54.21
800 metres	Linda Marguet	2:05.29	Fanjanteino Félix	2:05.45	Clarisse Moh	2:07.92
1500 metres	Hind Dehiba	4:15.24	Eliane Sahalinirina (MDG)	4:24.86	Claire Navez	4:25.26
60 m hurdles	Alice Decaux	7.97 PB	Sandra Gomis	8.00	Clémence Vifquin	8.30
3000 m walk	Sylwia Korzeniowska	12:58.80	Fabienne Chanfreau	13:54.27	Anne-Gaëlle Retout	14:13.84
High jump	Mélanie Melfort	1.88 m	Sandrine Champion	1.81 m	Nina Manga	1.78 m
Pole vault	Marion Lotout	4.25 m PB	Alice Ost Maria Leonor Tavares (POR)	4.15 m	Not awarded	
Long jump	Haoua Kessely	6.47 m PB	Éloyse Lesueur	6.45 m	Elise Vesanes	6.34 m
Triple jump	Haoua Kessely	13.91 m PB	Nathalie Marie-Nely	13.87 m PB	Françoise Mbango Etone	13.75 m
Shot put	Jessica Cérival	17.99 m PB	Marie Patrice Mondoloni Calabre	14.48 m	Lucie Catouillart	14.40 m
Pentathlon	Blandine Maisonnier	4085 pts	Diane Barras	3988 pts	Anouk Lejeune	3823 pts PB
