= Athletics at the 2008 Summer Olympics – Women's 200 metres =

Women's 200 metres at the Games of the XXIX Olympiad
- Venue: Beijing National Stadium
- Dates: August 19; August 20; August 21 (final)
- Competitors: 46 from 36 nations
- Winning time: 21.74 s

Medalists
1st place, gold medalist(s)		Veronica Campbell-Brown; Jamaica
2nd place, silver medalist(s)		Allyson Felix; United States
3rd place, bronze medalist(s)		Kerron Stewart; Jamaica

The women's 200 metres at the 2008 Summer Olympics took place on 19–21 August (final) at the Beijing National Stadium. The winning margin was 0.19 seconds. The winner had the second fastest reaction time in the final.

Allyson Felix, the young American athlete and already a double World champion, entered the 200m race in Beijing as a favorite for the gold. Defending champion Veronica Campbell-Brown of Jamaica also appeared to be in great form, setting a new personal best of 21.94 seconds at the Olympic trials.

In the final, Campbell-Brown had the quickest start and made up the stagger very quickly on Allyson Felix, who had been drawn in the lane outside of her. Running a stellar curve and accelerating out of the bend, the Jamaican athlete held her form to cross the line in 21.74 seconds, the fastest time of the decade and a new personal best.

Veronica Campbell-Brown, who suffered from injuries that led to disappointment in the 200m in the 2007 World Championships, returned to form to become only the second woman in history to win back-to-back Olympic 200m titles. Allyson Felix was once again relegated to the silver medal in a seasonal best of 21.93, the second-fastest time of her career. Jamaican Kerron Stewart won the bronze medal by just a hundredth of a second.

The qualifying standards were 23.00 s (A standard) and 23.20 s (B standard).

== Records ==
Prior to this competition, the existing world record, Olympic record, and world leading time were as follows:

World record	Florence Griffith-Joyner (United States)	21.34 s	Seoul, South Korea	29 September 1988
Olympic record	Florence Griffith-Joyner (USA)	21.34 s	Seoul, South Korea	29 September 1988
World Leading	Veronica Campbell-Brown (JAM)	21.94 s	Kingston, Jamaica	29 June 2008

No new world or Olympic records were set for this event.

== Results ==
=== Round 1 ===
Qualification: First 4 in each heat (Q) and the next 8 fastest (q) advance to the Round 2.

Rank	Heat	Athlete	Country	Time	Notes
1	2	Muna Lee	United States	22.71	Q
2	2	Muriel Hurtis-Houairi	France	22.72	Q
3	2	Cydonie Mothersille	Cayman Islands	22.76	Q, SB
4	4	Roqaya Al-Gassra	Bahrain	22.81	Q
5	6	Nataliya Pyhyda	Ukraine	22.91	Q, =PB
6	6	Sherone Simpson	Jamaica	22.94	Q
7	4	Emily Freeman	Great Britain	22.95	Q
8	2	Yuliya Chermoshanskaya	Russia	22.98	DSQ
9	1	Allyson Felix	United States	23.02	Q
10	4	Kerron Stewart	Jamaica	23.03	Q
11	5	Veronica Campbell-Brown	Jamaica	23.04	Q
11	1	Susanthika Jayasinghe	Sri Lanka	23.04	Q
13	5	Kadiatou Camara	Mali	23.06	Q
14	3	Marshevet Hooker	United States	23.07	Q
15	6	Roxana Díaz	Cuba	23.09	Q
16	6	LaVerne Jones-Ferrette	Virgin Islands	23.12	Q
17	2	Ivet Lalova	Bulgaria	23.13	q, SB
18	1	Virgil Hodge	Saint Kitts and Nevis	23.14	Q
19	5	Natalia Rusakova	Russia	23.21	Q
20	3	Debbie Ferguson-McKenzie	Bahamas	23.22	Q
21	4	Ionela Târlea	Romania	23.24	Q
22	1	Aleksandra Fedoriva	Russia	23.29	Q
23	3	Oludamola Osayomi	Nigeria	23.31	Q
24	5	Sheniqua Ferguson	Bahamas	23.33	Q
24	4	Darlenis Obregón	Colombia	23.33	q
26	5	Adrienne Power	Canada	23.40	q
27	6	Evelyn dos Santos	Brazil	23.43	q
28	5	Vincenza Calì	Italy	23.44	q
28	4	Guzel Khubbieva	Uzbekistan	23.44	q
30	6	Allison George	Grenada	23.45	q
31	1	Inna Eftimova	Bulgaria	23.50	q
32	3	Eleni Artymata	Cyprus	23.58	Q, SB
33	6	Marta Jeschke	Poland	23.59	
34	4	Jade Bailey	Barbados	23.62	
34	3	Sabina Veit	Slovenia	23.62	
36	5	Isabel Le Roux	South Africa	23.67	
37	3	Gloria Kemasuode	Nigeria	23.72	
38	3	Meritzer Williams	Saint Kitts and Nevis	23.83	
39	2	Mariely Sánchez	Dominican Republic	24.05	
40	3	Fabienne Feraez	Benin	24.07	
40	2	Carol Rodríguez	Puerto Rico	24.07	
42	1	Kia Davis	Liberia	24.31	
43	4	Lai Lai Win	Myanmar	24.37	
44	1	Kirsten Nieuwendam	Suriname	24.46	NR
45	6	Gretta Taslakian	Lebanon	25.32	SB
46	5	Samia Yusuf Omar	Somalia	32.16	
	1	Vida Anim	Ghana	DNS	
	2	Kim Gevaert	Belgium	DNS	

=== Round 2 ===
Qualification: First 3 in each heat (Q) and the next 4 fastest (q) advance to the Semifinals.

Rank	Heat	Athlete	Country	Time	Notes
1	4	Sherone Simpson	Jamaica	22.60	Q
2	3	Yuliya Chermoshanskaya	Russia	22.63	DSQ
3	1	Veronica Campbell-Brown	Jamaica	22.64	Q
4	1	Allyson Felix	United States	22.74	Q
4	3	Kerron Stewart	Jamaica	22.74	Q
6	2	Roqaya Al-Gassra	Bahrain	22.76	Q
6	3	Marshevet Hooker	United States	22.76	Q
8	1	Debbie Ferguson-McKenzie	Bahamas	22.77	Q
9	4	Muna Lee	United States	22.83	Q
9	1	Cydonie Mothersille	Cayman Islands	22.83	q
11	2	Muriel Hurtis-Houairi	France	22.89	Q
12	2	Susanthika Jayasinghe	Sri Lanka	22.94	Q
13	4	Emily Freeman	Great Britain	22.95	Q
14	2	Roxana Díaz	Cuba	22.98	q
15	3	Nataliya Pyhyda	Ukraine	23.03	q
16	2	Aleksandra Fedoriva	Russia	23.04	q
17	3	Kadiatou Camara	Mali	23.06	
18	4	Ivet Lalova	Bulgaria	23.15	
19	4	Virgil Hodge	Saint Kitts and Nevis	23.17	
20	1	Ionela Târlea	Romania	23.22	
21	2	Oludamola Osayomi	Nigeria	23.27	
22	4	Natalia Rusakova	Russia	23.28	
23	1	Evelyn dos Santos	Brazil	23.35	
24	1	LaVerne Jones-Ferrette	Virgin Islands	23.37	
25	2	Darlenis Obregón	Colombia	23.40	
26	2	Inna Eftimova	Bulgaria	23.48	
27	3	Adrienne Power	Canada	23.51	
28	3	Vincenza Calì	Italy	23.56	
29	3	Sheniqua Ferguson	Bahamas	23.61	
30	4	Eleni Artymata	Cyprus	23.77	
31	4	Allison George	Grenada	23.77	
	1	Guzel Khubbieva	Uzbekistan	DNS	

=== Semifinals ===
Qualification: First 4 in each heat (Q) advance to the Final.

==== Semifinal 1 ====
20 August 2008 - 21:55 Wind: 0.0 m/s

Rank	Lane	Athlete	Country	Time	Notes	React
1	5	Veronica Campbell-Brown	Jamaica	22.19	Q	0.187
2	7	Kerron Stewart	Jamaica	22.29	Q	0.217
3	4	Muna Lee	United States	22.29	Q, PB	0.186
4	9	Debbie Ferguson-McKenzie	Bahamas	22.51	Q	0.165
5	6	Yuliya Chermoshanskaya	Russia	22.57	DSQ	0.204
6	3	Nataliya Pyhyda	Ukraine	22.95		0.160
7	8	Susanthika Jayasinghe	Sri Lanka	22.98		0.245
8	2	Roxana Díaz	Cuba	23.12		0.177

==== Semifinal 2 ====
20 August 2008 - 22:04 Wind: -0.2 m/s

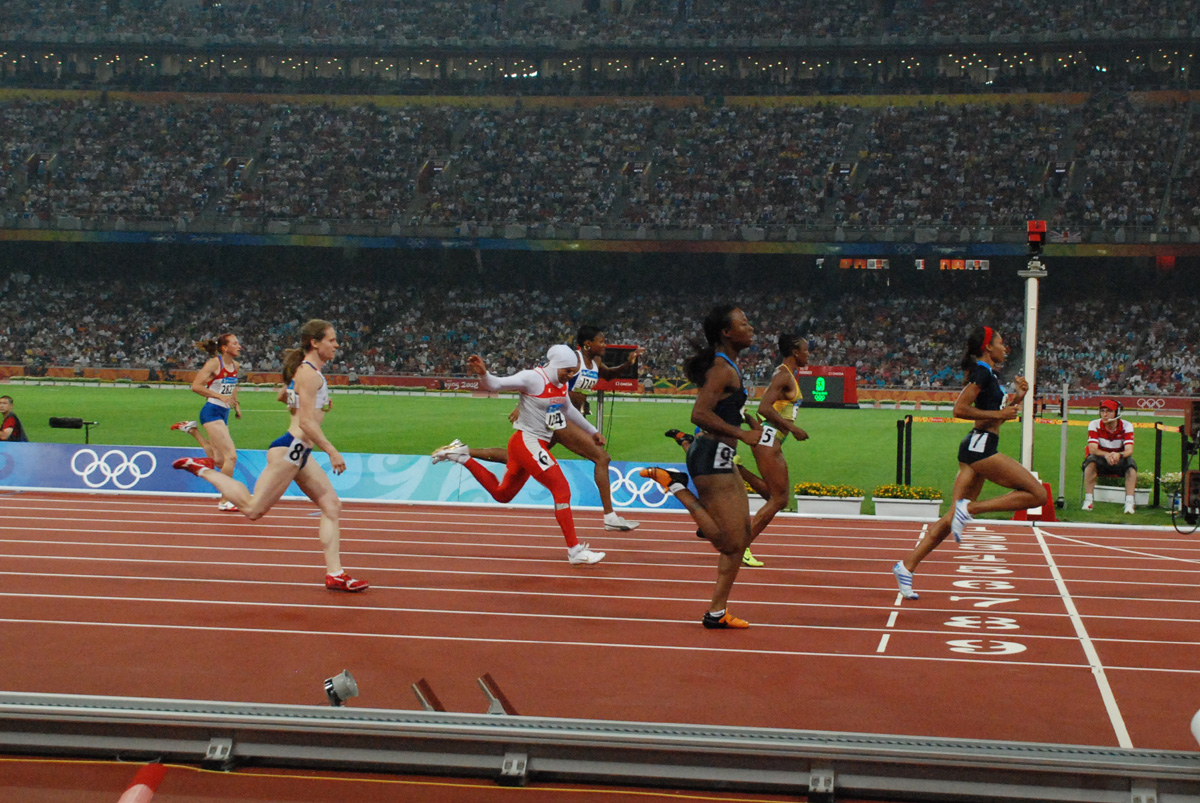
Allyson Felix wins the second semifinal.

Rank	Lane	Athlete	Country	Time	Notes	React
1	7	Allyson Felix	United States	22.33	Q	0.181
2	9	Marshevet Hooker	United States	22.50	Q	0.196
3	5	Sherone Simpson	Jamaica	22.50	Q	0.175
4	3	Cydonie Mothersille	Cayman Islands	22.61	Q, SB	0.212
5	4	Muriel Hurtis-Houairi	France	22.71		0.188
6	6	Roqaya Al-Gassra	Bahrain	22.72		0.259
7	8	Emily Freeman	Great Britain	22.83		0.201
8	2	Aleksandra Fedoriva	Russia	23.22		0.202

=== Final ===
21 August 2008 - Wind: 0.6 m/s

Rank	Lane	Name	Country	Reaction Time	Time	Notes
1st place, gold medalist(s)	4	Veronica Campbell-Brown	Jamaica	0.172	21.74	PB
2nd place, silver medalist(s)	5	Allyson Felix	United States	0.193	21.93	SB
3rd place, bronze medalist(s)	6	Kerron Stewart	Jamaica	0.199	22.00	
4	9	Muna Lee	United States	0.176	22.01	PB
5	7	Marshevet Hooker	United States	0.200	22.34	PB
6	8	Sherone Simpson	Jamaica	0.167	22.36	
7	2	Debbie Ferguson-McKenzie	Bahamas	0.175	22.61	
8	3	Cydonie Mothersille	Cayman Islands	0.206	22.68	

WR world record | AR area record | CR championship record | GR games record | NR national record | OR Olympic record | PB personal best | SB season best | WL world leading (in a given season)
