= Somalia at the 1972 Summer Olympics =

- IOC code: SOM
- NOC: Somali Olympic Committee

in Munich
- Competitors: 3 in 1 sport
- Flag bearer: Mohamed Aboker
- Medals: Gold 0 Silver 0 Bronze 0 Total 0

Summer Olympics appearances (overview)
- 1972; 1976–1980; 1984; 1988; 1992; 1996; 2000; 2004; 2008; 2012; 2016; 2020; 2024

Somalia competed in the Olympic Games for the first time at the 1972 Summer Olympics in Munich, West Germany.

== Athletics ==
Men

| Athlete | Event | Heat | | Semi Final | | Final | |
| Athlete | Event | Result | Rank | Result | Rank | Result | Rank |
|---|---|---|---|---|---|---|---|
| Mohamed Aboker | 800 m | did not start | | | | | |
| Mohamed Aboker | 1500 m | 3:59.5 | 10 | did not advance | | | |
| Jama Awil Aden | marathon | —N/a | | | | did not finish | |

Field events

| Athlete | Event | Qualification | | Final | |
| Athlete | Event | Distance | Position | Distance | Position |
|---|---|---|---|---|---|
| Abdullah Noor Wasughe | High jump | 2.00 | 33 | did not advance | |

Key

- Note–Ranks given for track events are within the athlete's heat only
- Q = Qualified for the next round
- q = Qualified for the next round as a fastest loser or, in field events, by position without achieving the qualifying target
- NR = National record
- N/A = Round not applicable for the event
- Bye = Athlete not required to compete in round
