= Abdi Isak =

Somali marathon runner

Personal information
- Nationality: Somali
- Born: 1 January 1966 (age 60)

Sport
- Country: Somalia
- Sport: Athletics
- Event: Marathon

Abdi Isak (born 1 January 1966) is a marathon runner who competed internationally for Somalia.

Adani competed at the 1996 Summer Olympics in Atlanta, he competed in the marathon finishing in 110th position.
