= Jama Aden =

Somali middle-distance runner

Personal information
- Nationality: Somali, British
- Born: August 28, 1962 (age 64) Aynaba, Somaliland

Sport
- Sport: Track
- Events: 800 metres, 1500 metres, Mile
- College team: Farleigh Dickinson
- Coached by: John Cook and Mal Whitfield
- Now coaching: Ayanleh Souleiman, Abubaker Kaki, Abdalelah Haroun, Musaeb Abdulrahman Balla, Mukhtar Mohammed, Hamada Mohamed, Ibrahim Jeilan

Achievements and titles
- Personal bests: 800 metres: 1:46.73; 1500 metres: 3:38.12; Mile: 3:56.82; 3000 metres: 7:53.85

Jama Mohamed Aden (born August 28, 1962) is a Somali former middle-distance runner and coach who ran for Fairleigh Dickinson University and represented Somalia throughout the 1980s. He went on to coach middle-distance athletes. He is the older brother of former competitive runner Ibrahim Mohamed Aden. He was born in Ainabo in eastern Somaliland.

== Running career ==
=== Collegiate ===
Aden was recruited with an athletic scholarship by Fairleigh Dickinson University, for which he set multiple records, many of which still stand today. He was especially known for having run a 3:56.82 mile as a junior undergrad. He was coached by Mal Whitfield, two times Olympic champion.

=== International ===
Aden ran for Somalia at the 1983 World Championships in Athletics and at the 1984 Summer Olympics. At the 1983 World Championships, he competed in both the men's 800 metres and men's 1500 metres, but did not advance to the finals in either distance. At the 1984 Summer Olympics, he finished in fifth place of the second heat in the men's 1500 metres, Pascal Thiebaut (FRA) won the heat and Sebastian Coe (GBR) was second. Aden did not advance to the finals. He competed in the men's 1500 metres at the 1988 Summer Olympics.

== Coaching ==
Aden earned a master's degree in exercise physiology at George Mason University, after which he pursued a coaching career. He was assisting John Cook in coaching countryman and GMU runner Abdi Bile before he won the gold medal at the 1987 World Championships in Athletics. Among the successful runners Aden has coached himself are two-times 800 metres world indoor champion Abukaker Kaki Khamis, 2008 Beijing Olympics 800 metres silver-medalist Ismael Ahmed Ismael, 2012 London Olympics 1500 metres champion Taoufik Makhloufi, 2012 world junior 1500 metres champion Hamza Driouch, 2013 world indoor champion and indoor world record holder at 1000 metres Ayanleh Souleiman, and several times world champion and world record holder at 1500 metres indoor and outdoor as well as Mile, 3000 and 5000 metres indoor – Genzebe Dibaba. In 2011 Aden was selected as the most worthy of 132 candidates from 16 Arab countries who contended for the Mohammed Bin Rashid Al Maktoum Award for Sports Excellence.

After both had run world indoor records in Stockholm Globengalan (former XL Galan) February 17, 2016 Dibaba (mile) and Souleiman (1000 m) expressed their gratitude to their coach. Souleiman said: "I want to thank my coach, Jama Aden, for working so hard with me." In the same meeting another of Jama Aden's athletes, 18-year-old Abdalelah Haroun produced a 500 metres world best time and became first man ever running below 60 seconds indoor.

In an interview from November 2012 in Swedish daily newspaper Dagens Nyheter, Aden describes his coaching philosophy and compares with differences between Europe and Africa. He says it takes time to become a top athlete and runner. "Have the Europeans become lazy?" he was asked, he replies: "No not at all. It's not about laziness. But it takes time for results to come in elite running, therefore you don't prioritise it". He also reveals his satisfaction when Makhloufi crossed the line as winner of the Blue Ribbon event of the Olympics, the 1500 metres, in London 2012. "I was speechless. I felt that all hard work paid back at that moment". He then goes on and explains the importance of full-time coaching if you want to have long term success.

"If you look at the coaches in running today who have had success, like Alberto Salazar with Mo Farah and Galen Rupp, myself, Peter Coe and Harry Wilson, who coached Steve Ovett, we are, or have been, full time coaches. I live next to my athletes and they are like my family. In Sweden, you coach part time. Then it becomes more difficult for the runner to achieve great success".

In New York Times, during Olympic Games and few days after Ben Johnson was caught for doping in the famous 100 metres final. Jama Aden commented and also explained to Frank Litsky the psychology behind the use of doping in sport. "Jama Aden of Somalia, who ran for Fairleigh Dickinson University, will run in the Olympic 1,500-meter heats Thursday. He said athletes who used drugs feared losing more than they feared detection. 'This will scare them,' he said. 'They're scared now. But they know if they get away with taking drugs they will run good times. They want to win and they are willing to take chances to win.'"

=== Doping allegations ===
In 2015 two of Jama Aden's athletes were suspended for doping violation, Laila Traby from France and Hamza Driouch from Qatar. Driouch was banned for inconsistencies in his biological passport, dated to 2 Aug 2012 during the London Olympics when Aden was his coach. His actual suspension time was set to 31 Dec 2014 to 30 Dec 2016. Hamza Driouch left Aden in September 2012 after the Olympics, and by April 30, 2013; Driouch was coached by Abdelkader Kada, Hicham El Guerrouj‘s former coach. Jama was forced by Qatari federation to continue assisting and coaching Hamza in Team Jama Aden and Hamza was running with the team again in February 2015 in Ethiopia. A plausible explanation for the delayed announcement of Driouch's doping ban is found in the WADA Independent commission report #2 (page 68). It is further explained under entry Hamza Driouch.

On 30 January 2016, the French athletic site SPE15.fr established by Gilles Bertrand and Odile Baudrier with the motto – "No Drug, just fighting spirit" – released an interview (in French) with Hamza, where he accuses Jama. "I believed in my coach, and that was the wrong decision. The doping problem comes from the coach Jama Aden". A full translation of the French interview can be found at Letsrun.com. Surprisingly on February 15, 2016, less than three weeks later, Hamza took his accusations back via the same French athletic site, "Jama gave me vitamins for recovery, and I'm not a victim due to Jama Aden".

Aden's second athlete caught for doping in 2015, Laila Traby, was suspended for EPO-use after French police found EPO in her apartment (Font-Romeu) in Nov 2014 and later she tested positive.

When interviewed by French sport paper L'Equipe after Genzebe Dibaba set the world record i Monaco Diamond League 2015, Aden told the journalist his personal best at 1500 meter was 3.36. "un athlète moyen, dit-il. 1'46’’ sur 800 m et 3’36’’ au 1 500 m". According to statistics from IAAF, Aden's personal best at 1500 metres is 3.38.

In the Swedish daily newspaper Expressen, prior to 2015 World Championship in Beijing, Volker Wagner commented on Genezbe's world record at 1500 metres with: "This is something I don't believe in! " The Ethiopian sport journalist Bizuayehu Wagaw with running as specialization commented in turn what Wagner said with: "He should be silent [...] it is a shame people say like that without the person is proven guilty".

In June 2016, Aden was arrested in Spain after police raided his hotel room and found performance-enhancing substances. After a long legal process, Aden was acquitted of the charges in November 2022.
