= Ali Idow =

Somali athlete

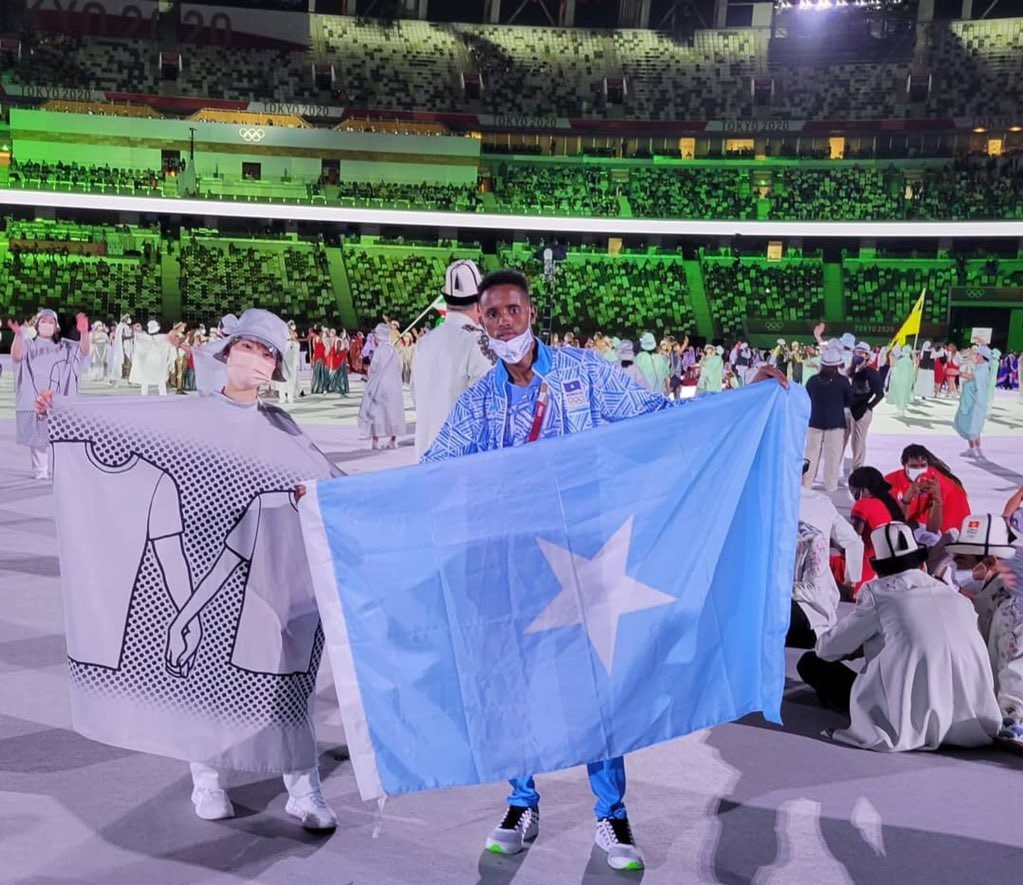
- Ali Idow Hassan at the 2020 Summer Olympics Opening Ceremony

Personal information
- Nationality: Somalia
- Born: Ali Idow Hassan; 1 July 1998 (age 28) Mogadishu, Somalia

Sport
- Sport: Track and Field
- Events: 800m, 1500m

Achievements and titles
- Personal bests: 800 metres – 1:46.40 (Douala 2024); 1500 metres – 3:40.20 (Dubai 2024)

Ali Idow Hassan (Arabic: علي إيدو حسين born 1 July 1998) is a Somali middle-distance runner who has competed at multiple Olympic Games.

== Career ==
He was selected to compete at the 2020 Summer Games in the men's 1500 metres. He was granted an audience with then Somali president Mohamed Abdullahi Mohamed at the Presidential Palace in Mogadishu along with the Minister of Youth and Sports of the Federal Government of Somalia, Hamse Said Hamse, prior to the event.

He was given the honour of being a flag bearer for his nation in the Olympics opening ceremony. He ran a personal best in the 1500m in Tokyo, as he finished tenth in his heat in a time of 3.43:96.

He competed in the 800m at the 2022 African Championships and ran a personal best time of 1:49.03 as he qualified from his heat into the semi-finals, where he was tenth fastest in a time of 1:49.24.

He was the only athlete from his nation, in any sport, to qualify for the 2024 Summer Olympics. He competed in the 800 metres at the 800 metres in Paris in August 2024.

Olympic Games
| Preceded by Mohamed Daud Mohamed | Flag bearer for Somalia; Tokyo 2020 with Ramla Ali; Paris 2024 | Succeeded by Incumbent |
