= Abdinasir Said Ibrahim =

Somalian long-distance runner

Abdinasir Said Ibrahim عبد الناصر سعيد ابراهيم
Personal information
- Nationality: Somali
- Born: 1 July 1989 (age 37)
- Height: 5 ft 10 in (1.78 m)
- Weight: 154 lb (70 kg; 11.0 st)

Sport
- Sport: Running
- Event: 5000 m

Achievements and titles
- Personal best: 5000 m: 14:21.58 (Beijing 2008)

Abdinasir Said Ibrahim (Somali: Cabdinaasir Saiid Ibraahiim, Arabic: عبد الناصر سعيد ابراهيم) (born July 1, 1989)) is a track and field athlete from Somalia.

== Career ==
In preparation for competitive meets in 2008, Ibrahim and fellow athlete Samiya Yusuf Omar trained under difficult circumstances, facing harassment from local militants who interpreted his participation in official track events as compliance with the federal government authorities that they were waging war against. On account of civil unrest in Mogadishu, he also did not benefit from the consistent coaching, reliable facilities and competitive meets that other elite-level athletes enjoy.

Ibrahim represented Somalia at the 2008 Summer Olympics in Beijing, competing in the 5000 metres race. He finished in 37th place overall and 12th in his first round heat, with a time of 14:21.58. The International Association of Athletics Federations recorded the time as a personal best.
