= Somalia at the 2016 Summer Olympics =

- IOC code: SOM
- NOC: Somali Olympic Committee
- Website: www.nocsom.org

in Rio de Janeiro
- Competitors: 2 in 1 sport
- Flag bearer: Mohamed Daud Mohamed
- Medals: Gold 0 Silver 0 Bronze 0 Total 0

Summer Olympics appearances (overview)
- 1972; 1976–1980; 1984; 1988; 1992; 1996; 2000; 2004; 2008; 2012; 2016; 2020; 2024

Somalia competed at the 2016 Summer Olympics in Rio de Janeiro, Brazil, from 5 to 21 August 2016. The country's participation at Rio de Janeiro marked its ninth in the Summer Olympics since its debut in 1972. The delegation included two track and field athletes: sprinter Maryan Nuh Muse and long-distance runner Mohamed Daud Mohamed, who was the nation's flag bearer in the Parade of Nations. Neither athlete progressed past the first round of their respective competitions.

== Background ==
Somalia participated in nine Summer Olympics between its debut in the 1972 Summer Olympics in Munich, West Germany, and the 2016 Summer Olympics in Rio de Janeiro, Brazil. The highest number of Somalis participating at any single Summer Games was seven at the 1984 Games in Los Angeles, United States. No Somali has ever won a medal at an Olympics. Somalia received universality slots from the International Association of Athletics Federations to send one male and one female athlete to the 2016 Summer Olympics.

In 2014, the Somali Olympic Committee appointed a team of professionals to find talented Somali athletes for the upcoming Summer Olympics. Efforts were hampered by the ongoing Somali Civil War, both in access for the scouts and because athletes were fleeing the fighting. Samia Yusuf Omar, who represented the national at the 2008 Summer Olympics in Beijing, China, drowned off the Libyan coast while attempting to reach Europe by boat in 2012.

Maryan Nuh Muse was chosen to compete in the women's 400 metres and Kenyan-born Mohamed Daud Mohamed in the men's 5000 metres. Other Somali nationals competed at the 2016 Summer Olympics, but under the citizenships of other countries; these included Mo Farah, for Great Britain and Mohammed Ahmed, for Canada. Mohamed was chosen to be the Somalia's flag bearer during the Parade of Nations.

== Competitors ==
The following is the list of number of competitors participating in the Games.

Sport	Men	Women	Total
Athletics	1	1	2
Total	1	1	2

== Athletics ==
Somalia was represented by one male athlete at the 2016 Games in athletics – Mohamed Daud Mohamed, a 5000 metres runner. It marked his first appearance at an international athletics competition, following a transition into athletics from football. He said prior to the Olympics, "I am improving by the day and I hope to improve on my finish time. Running is hard and all athletes aim to win. My objective is to win; but there are different ways of winning. It is not about being first, second or third. If I set a new personal record, it is a win for me". Mohamed competed on 17 August in the first heat of the 5000 metres, finishing in 24th position out of the 25 runners, only ahead of Rosefelo Siosi of the Solomon Islands, thus eliminating him from the competition.

The country's sole female athlete at the 2016 Games was Maryan Nuh Muse, in the 400 metres. Muse had previously competed on behalf of Somalia at international youth athletic competitions around the world. Prior to the competition, she spoke of the difference in the quality of the training facilities in Somalia compared to those in other countries, saying "A number of countries will be participating among them Jamaica and United States; but I am hoping to shine. We don't have the same training facilities, theirs is better than ours. I know they are determined to win but we are also equally determined." She competed in the sixth heat of the 400 metres competition on 13 August; she came in last place with a time of 1:10:14, over 18 seconds behind the heat's winner Salwa Eid Naser of Bahrain.

Key

- Note–Ranks given for track events are within the athlete's heat only
- N/A = Round not applicable for the event

Track events

Athlete	Event	Heat		Semifinal		Final	
Athlete	Event	Time	Rank	Time	Rank	Time	Rank
Mohamed Daud Mohamed	Men's 5000 m	14:57.84	24	—N/a		Did not advance	
Maryan Nuh Muse	Women's 400 m	1:10.14	8	Did not advance			
