= Maryan Nuh Muse =

Somali sprinter

Maryan Nuh Muse (born January 1, 1997) is a Somali sprinter. She competed at the 2016 Summer Olympics in the women's 400 metres race; her time of 1:10.14 in the heats. Prior to the Olympics, she competed at the 2014 Youth Olympic Games and her training was in a stadium in Mogadishu. She believes Somali athletes' are working hard for the next summer olympics.
