= Philipp Bandi =

Swiss athletics competitor

Personal information
- Nationality: Swiss
- Born: September 28, 1977 (age 48)
- Height: 1.93 m (6 ft 4 in)
- Weight: 74 kg (163 lb)

Sport
- Country: Switzerland
- Sport: Track and field
- Event: 5000m
- Club: Gymnastische Gesellschaft Bern
- Coached by: Gerhard Dieboldswyler

Achievements and titles
- Personal best: 5000m: 13:25.83 s

Philipp Bandi (born 28 September 1977) is a Swiss track and field athlete competing mainly in the 5000 metres and middle distance events. Bandi competed in the 5000 metres at the 2008 Summer Olympics in Beijing, but failed to qualify for the final.
