= Jama Awil Aden =

Somali athletics competitor

Jama Awil Aden (born 2 September 1948) is a former long-distance runner who competed for Somalia.

Aden was a member of Somalia's first ever Summer Olympic team when he competed at the 1972 Summer Olympics held in Munich. He entered the marathon but was one of the eleven runners who didn't finish the course.
