= Safia Abukar Hussein =

Somalian sprinter

Safia Abukar Hussein (born 1 January 1981) is a sprinter who competed internationally for Somalia. Hussein was the first Somali female to compete at the Olympics for her country when she competed in the 400 metres at the 2000 Summer Olympics in Sydney.

She was not always supported in Somalia, where female athletes are uncommon and older men would criticise her for not staying at home. Hussein's father disliked the idea, as he was concerned that it would prevent her from finding a husband. Nevertheless, he subsequently allowed her to compete in Sydney for the sake of Somalia. Ultimately, she finished her heat in sixth place and did not progress to the next round.
