= Jamale Aarrass =

French middle-distance runner

Personal information
- Born: 15 November 1981 (age 44) Bezons, France
- Height: 187 cm (6 ft 2 in)
- Weight: 75 kg (165 lb)

Sport
- Country: France
- Sport: Athletics (track and field)
- Events: 800 m, 1500 m
- Club: Entente Franconville Césame

Achievements and titles
- Personal bests: 800 m: 1:49.17 (2009); 1500 m: 3:34.85 (2012); One Mile: 3:52.21 (2012)

Jamale Aarrass (born 15 November 1981) is a French middle-distance runner who specializes in the 800 metres and the 1500 metres.

== International competitions ==
Representing France
Year	Competition	Venue	Position	Event	Result	Notes
2011	European Indoor Championships	Paris, France	8th	1500 m	3:44.08	
2012	Summer Olympics	London, United Kingdom	37th	1500 m	3:45.13	

== National titles ==
- French Indoor Athletics Championships
  - 1500 m: 2011

== Personal bests ==
Distance	Surface	Time	Location	Year
800 m	outdoor	1:49:17	Zaragoza	2009
1500	outdoor	3:34.85	Los Angeles	2012
Mile run	outdoor	3:52:21	Walnut, California	2012
800 m	indoor	1:48:32	Vienna	2008
1500 m	indoor	3:40:72	Val de Reuil	2011
