= Mohiddin Mohamed Kulmiye =

Somali long-distance runner

Mohiddin Mohamed Kulmiye (1958 – 1991) was a marathon runner who competed internationally for Somalia.

Kulmiye competed at the 1984 Summer Olympics in Los Angeles and the 1988 Summer Olympics in Seoul. In the 1984 10000 metres he finished 11th in his heat and thus did not advance to the final. In 1988 he competed in the marathon and finished in 91st position.
