= Samia Yusuf Omar =

Somali sprinter

Saamiya Yusuf Omar
- Omar at the 2008 Olympics

Personal information
- Nationality: Somali
- Born: 25 March 1991 Mogadishu, Somalia
- Died: 2 April 2012 (aged 21) Mediterranean Sea

Sport
- Sport: Running
- Events: 100 m, 200 m, 1500 m

Achievements and titles
- Personal best: 200 m – 32.16 (2008)

Samia Yusuf Omar or Samiyo Omar (Somali: Saamiya Yuusuf Cumar; Arabic: سامية يوسف عمر; 25 March 1991 – April 2012) was a sprinter from Somalia. She was one of two Somali athletes who competed for their nation at the 2008 Summer Olympics in Beijing, China. Omar had grown up in Mogadishu, and trained there during the Somali Civil War despite receiving threats from local militias. Her story at the Olympics was covered by the media, and her performance was well received by the crowd.

Following the Games, she hid away from athletics following threats by militant group Al-Shabaab. She ended up in a Hizbul-Islam displacement camp, and in pursuit of competing at the 2012 Summer Olympics, she crossed the border to Ethiopia looking for a safe place to train. She was trafficked north into Libya, where she was imprisoned. During the 2012 Games, it was revealed that Omar had drowned off the coast of Libya while attempting to cross the Mediterranean Sea to Italy.

== Early life ==
Samia Yusuf Omar was born in Somalia on 25 March 1991, to Omar Yusuf and Dahabo Ali and was the oldest of six children. Her mother was an athlete who competed at a national level within Somalia. The family came from one of the country's minority ethnic groups.

Both Omar's father and uncle were killed following a mortar attack on Bakaara Market. Omar was in the eighth grade at the time, and she dropped out of school in response to look after her siblings while her mother sold produce to provide for the family. Following the encouragement of her mother, she decided to take up running. She would train at Mogadishu Stadium, as the family lived nearby in a hovel. The stadium had a gravel running track, pitted with mortar craters from the ongoing Somali Civil War. When not running at the stadium, she would run on the streets of Mogadishu, facing harassment from local militants who did not believe that Muslim women should participate in sporting activities.

== Sporting competitions ==
In April 2008, at the 2008 African Championships in Athletics in Addis Ababa, Ethiopia, she finished last in her heat. Omar was selected by the Somali Olympic Committee to compete in the 200 metres at the 2008 Summer Olympics in Beijing, China, between 8 and 24 August 2008. She said the call-up was unexpected, both because of her young age at the time, and because she was from a minority ethnic group.

Because of a lack of funding, Omar competed in equipment donated by the Sudanese team, lining up in a heat which included eventual gold medallist Veronica Campbell-Brown from Jamaica. Omar finished some nine seconds adrift of the other runners, with a time of 32.16. The crowd in the stadium gave a huge level of support to Omar, with journalist Charles Robinson saying "I literally got goosebumps. They were just sort of pushing her." and The Guardian suggesting that she received a louder cheer than Campbell-Brown. The story of the Somali girl was picked up by the media prior to the race, but afterwards the interest died down due to the language barrier between Omar and the interviewers and because of her lack of interest in publicising herself.

== Post Olympics ==
Her competition at the Olympics received little coverage in Somalia. Her heat took place at midnight in the East Africa Time zone, and no television or radio broadcasts of it were made locally. As such, none of her family had seen her compete. After a confrontation with the militant group Al-Shabaab, she was left shaken and no longer admitted to others that she was an athlete. By December 2009, she and her family were living in a displacement camp organised by the Islamic insurgent group Hizbul-Islam, located about 20 kilometres (12 mi) outside Mogadishu. Al-Shabaab had banned all women from participating in or watching sports.

In 2011, Omar fled the fighting of the civil war and moved to Addis Abeba, leaving her family behind, partly to pursue her dream of competing at the 2012 Summer Olympics in London, United Kingdom. Now a middle-distance athlete, she was due to begin training with former Olympian Eshetu Tura, who was recommended to her by the prominent Qatar-based Somali track coach Jama Aden and the Olympic medalist Mohamed Suleiman. She was allowed to train with the middle distance Ethiopian team once approval from the Ethiopian Olympic Committee was received. Her personal best time when first meeting with the Ethiopian team was 5 minutes for the 1500 metres; it was made clear that she would need to meet 4:20 to be competitive.

She built up a friendship with Al Jazeera journalist Teresa Krug, who covered her story both at the Olympics and afterwards. Krug later reported that in a desire to find a coach, Omar travelled north towards Europe, crossing the Sudans and entering Libya. Both Omar's family and Krug attempted to talk her out of it, and to remain in Ethiopia where the Somali Olympic Committee were hoping to set up a training camp. Instead, she had paid people smugglers to take her to Libya, where she was imprisoned for a period.

== Death and legacy ==
On 19 August 2012, the Corriere della Sera reported that Samia had died while on her way to Italy on a boat from Libya. The information came from her compatriot and fellow runner Abdi Bile, and was "difficult to verify" according to the newspaper. The story came to light during the 2012 Summer Olympics, although Omar's death had occurred earlier that year in April.

On 21 August, the BBC reported that it had received confirmation of Omar's death from Somalia's National Olympic Committee. The Huffington Post reported that Qadijo Aden Dahir, the deputy chairman for Somalia's athletics federation, had confirmed that Omar had drowned off the Libyan seaboard while trying to reach Italy from her home in Ethiopia. Qadijo added that "it's a sad death... She was our favourite for the London Olympics".

Exact details of her death eventually came to light; she boarded a packed boat with 70 other people in an attempt to cross the Mediterranean Sea and reach Italy. The boat soon ran out of petrol and was adrift off the coast of Libya. When an Italian Navy vessel arrived to offer assistance, it threw ropes over the side to the refugees. In the chaos that ensued as people attempted to grab the ropes, Omar was knocked into the sea, where witnesses saw her treading water for a while, but eventually drowned.

Omar's story has inspired multiple works across different media, beginning with the 2014 novel Non dirmi che hai paura (Don't tell me you're afraid) by Italian writer and journalist Giuseppe Catozzella which was translated into over a dozen languages, becoming an international bestseller. The English language edition, translated by Anne Milano Appel, was published in 2016 by Penguin Press and Faber & Faber. In 2015, German graphic novelist Reinhard Kleist published his graphic novel Der Traum von Olympia – Die Geschichte von Samia Yusuf Omar (An Olympic Dream – The Story of Samia Yusuf Omar) at Carlsen Verlag. It was named the Luchs book of the year for 2015. The graphic novel was translated into English and published by SelfMadeHero in 2016.

Catozzella's novel was adapted into the 2024 feature film Samia by director Yasemin Şamdereli in collaboration with Italian-Somali artist Deka Mohamed Osman, with the screenplay co-written by Catozzella, Şamdereli, and her sister Nesrin Şamdereli. Ilham Mohamed Osman stars as Samia, with Riyan Roble portraying young Samia. Shot in Somali and English, the film was an international co-production by Italy, Germany, Belgium, the United Kingdom, and Sweden. The film premiered at the 2024 Tribeca Film Festival, where it received a Special Jury Mention, and won the Audience Prize at Filmfest München 2024. A new edition of Catozzella's novel was also published in 2024 by Penguin Press to coincide with the film's release.
