= Abdi Bile =

Athletics competitor

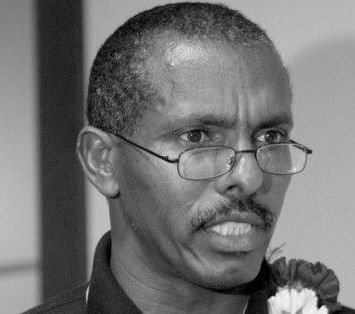
- Abdi Bile

Personal information
- Nationality: Somali
- Born: 28 December 1962 (age 63) Las Anod, Sool, Somali Republic (Somalia)
- Height: 1.85 m (6 ft 1 in)
- Weight: 75 kg (165 lb)

Sport
- Sport: Track
- Events: 800m, 1500m, mile, 3000m
- College team: George Mason

Achievements and titles
- Personal bests: 800m: 1:43.60; 1500m: 3:30.55; Mile: 3:49.40
Medal record
Men's athletics
Representing Somalia
World Championships in Athletics
Gold medal – first place	1987 Rome	1500 m
Bronze medal – third place	1993 Stuttgart	1500 m
Goodwill Games
Silver medal – second place	1994 Saint Petersburg	1 mile
African Championships
Silver medal – second place	1985 Cairo	1500 m
Representing Africa
IAAF World Cup
Gold medal – first place	1989 Barcelona	1500 m

Abdi Bile (Somali: Cabdi Bile Cabdi, Arabic: عبد بلي عبد; born 28 December 1962) is a former middle distance runner. He holds the highest number of national records in athletics in Somalia across various disciplines. He is currently Somalia's national record holder in nine athletic disciplines, and is thus far Somalia's most decorated athlete in history. (Note: See the List of Somali records in athletics page)

In 1987, he became world champion in the 1500 metres, the first Somali to do so. Bile ran the final 800m of the race in 1:46.0, which as of the 2020s, remains the fastest latter half in the history of the 1500m track race. During the semi-finals of the same championships, on 4 September 1987, he set a championship record with a time of 3:35.67 which lasted until 1 September 1991, when broken by Noureddine Morceli.

He defeated Britain's Sebastian Coe at the 1500m to win gold at the 1989 World Continental Cup. He also won silver at the same event in the 1985 African Championships in Cairo. In 1996 he represented Somalia at the 1996 Summer Olympics for the 1500 meters. His brother, Jama Bile, ran competitively for Northern Arizona University. His son Ahmed Bile ran competitively for Georgetown University.

== Early life ==
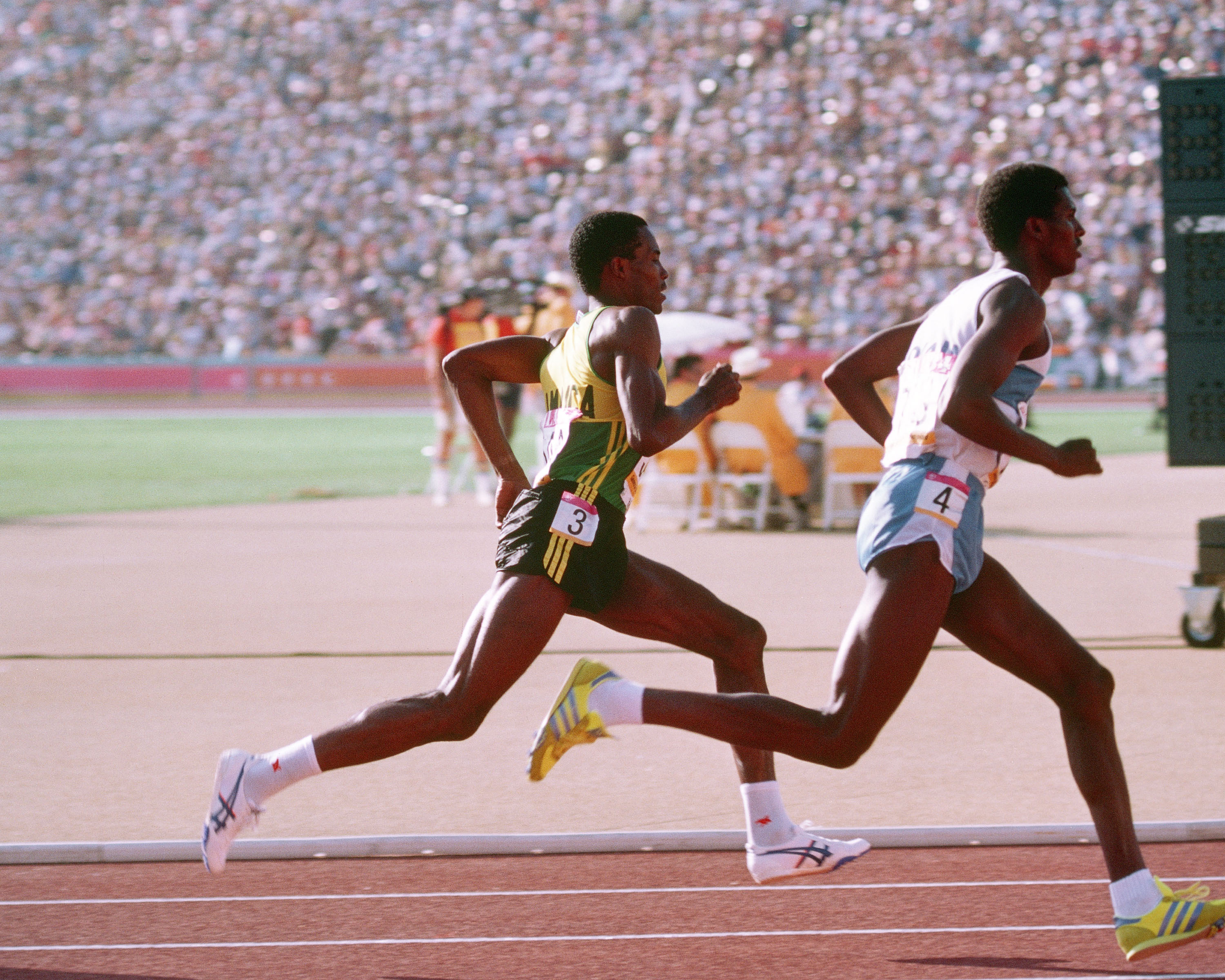
Bile (right) competing in the quarter-finals of the 800 meters in the 1984 Olympics

Bile was born in Las Anod, Somalia. He was raised with fourteen siblings, in a nomadic society. He completed high school in Erigavo. He began competitive running after hearing of the Somali runner Jamac Karacin, a scholarship recipient in the US. As a youth he was very interested in football/soccer.

== Running career ==
Bile won the 1500 m World Championship in 1987, running the final 800 m of the race in 1:46.00, the fastest final 800 m of any 1,500-metre race in history. He was a two-time Olympian (1984 and 1996) and dominated the event in the late 1980s. Bile was ranked first in the world at the mile distance in 1989. He was World Cup champion in the 1500 m in 1989 and two-time world Grand Prix final champion.

Bile graduated from George Mason University with a BSc in marketing management. At George Mason, Bile was team captain and a two-time NCAA Division I 1,500-metre champion, winning his first title in 1985 (3:41.20) and the second in 1987 (3:35.79). He also won many conference titles and held the inter-collegiate 1500 m record for more than ten years.

He was coached by John Cook, the former coach of 2008 Olympic 10,000-metre bronze medalist Shalane Flanagan. His career was riddled with injuries, and he missed the 1991 World Championships as well as the 1988 and 1992 Olympics because of such problems. In 1996 he finished sixth in the Olympic 1500 final. As of the 2020s, Bile has the 17th fastest 1,000-metre race of all time with a time of 2:14.50.

== Achievements ==
Year	Competition	Venue	Position	Notes
1984	Olympic Games	Los Angeles, United States	5th (quarter-finals)	800 metres
1984	Olympic Games	Los Angeles, United States	4th (heats)	1500 metres
1985	African Championships	Cairo, Egypt	2nd	1500 m
1987	World Championships	Rome, Italy	1st	1500 metres
1987	IAAF Grand Prix Final	Brussels, Belgium	1st	1500 m
1989	IAAF World Cup	Barcelona, Spain	1st	1500 m
1989	IAAF Grand Prix Final	Fontvieille, Monaco	1st	1500 m
1993	World Championships	Stuttgart, Germany	4th (heats)	800 m
1993	World Championships	Stuttgart, Germany	3rd	1500 metres
1993	IAAF Grand Prix Final	London, United Kingdom	2nd	1500 m
1994	IAAF Grand Prix Final	Paris, France	3rd	1500 m
1994	Goodwill Games	St. Petersburg, Russia	2nd	Mile
1995	World Championships	Gothenburg, Sweden	7th (heats)	1500 m
1996	Olympic Games	Atlanta, United States	6th	1500 metres

=== Awards and national records ===
Bile has won gold medals in the 1987 World Championships in 1987 at the 1500m. In 1989 he won the gold medal at the World Continental Cup in Barcelona at the 1500m in a time of 3:35.56. In 1987, he won first place at the NCAA Championships in Baton Rouge, Louisiana at the 1500m in a time of 3:35.79. In 1993, he won second place at the 1500m in the Grand Prix Final in London UK, in a time of 3:34.65. In the same year, he also won the bronze medal at the World Championships at 1500m in Stuttgart, Germany in a time of 3:35.96. At the 1985 African Championships in Athletics, he won silver at the 1500m. Bile holds Somalia's national records in seven outdoor disciplines, namely the 800m, 1000m, 1500m, one mile, 2000m, 3000m and the 4x1500 metre relay as well as in two indoor disciples, namely the 1500m and the one mile, thus in a total of nine disciplines. The collapse of state institutions from 1990 onwards and injuries had prevented Bile from competing at the Olympics during his prime years.

== Personal life ==
Bile has traveled widely and has inspired many young people and helped several humanitarian organizations. He is married, with two sons and daughter named Farhiya, born in 1995, Ahmed born 1993 and Mohamed born 2001. As a senior in high school, Ahmed won the Virginia state cross country title, the 1000m title and 1600m title along with being a two-time New Balance All-American in the 800m. The largest stadium in Las Anod is named after him.

== Notes ==
Olympic Games
Preceded by Mohamed Aboker; Aboukar Hassan Adani	Flagbearer for Somalia; Los Angeles 1984; Atlanta 1996	Succeeded by Aboukar Hassan Adani; Ibrahim Mohamed Aden
