= Ahmed Mohamed Ismail =

Somali athletics competitor

Ahmed Mohamed Ismail (born 6 June 1964) is a retired marathon runner who competed internationally for Somalia. He lived and trained in Hartford, Connecticut.

Ismail competed at the 1984 Summer Olympics in Los Angeles, finishing in 47th position out of the 107 runners who started. In October 1986 he won the Detroit Free Press Marathon. He also competed in the 1988 Summer Olympics in Seoul, but he did not complete the marathon.
