= Ibrahim Mohamed Aden =

Somali-American middle-distance runner

Personal information
- Nationality: Somali; American
- Born: November 11, 1972 (age 53) Burao, Somaliland

Sport
- Sport: Track
- Events: 800 metres, 1500 metres, Mile
- College team: Central Arizona; George Mason

Achievements and titles
- Personal bests: 800 metres: 1:46.44; 1500 metres: 3:37.02; Mile: 3:55.53

Ibrahim Mohamed Aden Gedi (born November 11, 1972) is a Somali-American former middle-distance runner who represented Somalia in international competition until he gained US citizenship in 2000, after which he competed for the United States. He is the younger brother of Jama Aden.

== Running career ==
=== High school ===
Aden first attended and ran for W.T. Woodson High School, for which he won the men's 1000 meters at the 1990 VHSL Group AAA State Indoor meet. After his sophomore year, however, he transferred to Fork Union Military Academy.

=== Collegiate ===
Aden attended and ran for George Mason University after transferring from Central Arizona CC. He ran in both the men's 800 meters and 1500 meters at the 1996 NCAA Division I Outdoor Track and Field Championships.

=== Post-collegiate ===
Aden ran for Somalia at the 1996 Olympics, the 1997 and 1999 World Championships in Athletics, making it to the semi-final round of the men's 1500 metres on the latter occasion. In 2000, right before that year's US Olympic Trials, he got US citizenship and opted to represent the United States in international competition. He competed in the 1500 metres at the 2000 Olympic Games without reaching the final.
