= Somali Olympic Committee =

National Olympic Committee for Somalia

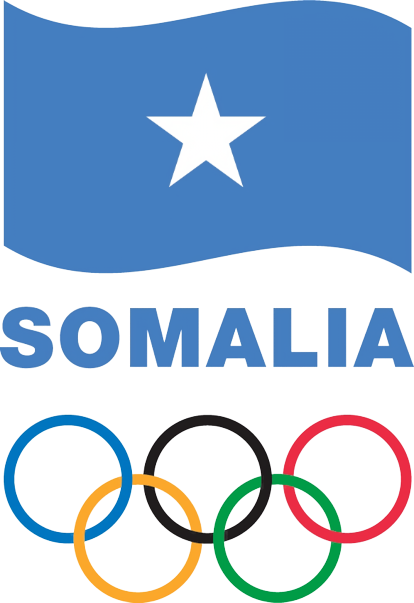
- Country: Somalia
- Code: SOM
- Created: 1959
- Recognized: 1972
- Continental Association: ANOCA
- Headquarters: Mogadishu
- President: Ahmed Abdi Hassan
- Secretary General: Mohammad Abdo Hagi
- Website: http://www.nocsom.com/so/

The Somali Olympic Committee (Somali: Guddiga Olimbikada Soomaaliyeed) is the National Olympic Committee representing Somalia.

== Logo ==
Former logo

== See also ==
- Somalia at the Olympics
