= Athletics at the 2002 Commonwealth Games – Men's 1500 metres =

Men's 1500 metres at the 2002 Commonwealth Games
- Venue: City of Manchester Stadium
- Dates: 30 July 2002 (heats); 31 July 2002 (final)
- Competitors: 18 from 14 nations
- Winning time: 3:37.35

Medalists
gold medal	Michael East	England
silver medal	William Chirchir	Kenya
bronze medal	Youcef Abdi	Australia

The men's 1500 metres event at the 2002 Commonwealth Games took place on 30 and 31 July at the City of Manchester Stadium in Manchester, England. Michael East won the gold medal in a personal best time of 3:37.35 and became the sixth Englishman to win the event. The 1998 world junior champion in the 800 metres, Kenyan William Chirchir placed second, taking the silver medal in 3:37.70. He finished ahead of Youcef Abdi of Australia who won the bronze. Abdi who formerly represented Algeria, switched allegiance to Australia in 2000.

This was the ninth running of the 1500 metres event at the Commonwealth Games after converting to metric at the 1970 Edinburgh Games. A 1 mile event was contested between 1930 and 1966. 18 competitors from 14 nations entered the event. Bernard Lagat, the Olympic bronze and world championship silver medallist chose not participate in the Games but rather contest the event at African Championships which he went on to win. His Kenyan compatriot, Olympic champion Noah Ngeny, sustained an injury to his back and pelvis as a result of a car accident in November 2001 which impacted his 2002 season which saw him not selected for these Games.

The defending champion from Kuala Lumpur, fellow Kenyan Laban Rotich also didn't compete at these Games, but finished second behind Lagat at the African Championships. Whilst the silver medallist, John Mayock, missed the English trials in June due to blisters. As a result he was not selected for his preferred distance but rather for the 5,000 metres where he narrowly missed the medals finishing fourth. Fellow English runner, Anthony Whiteman, narrowly missed out on securing back to back bronze finishing fourth in the final.

== Records ==
Prior to this competition, the existing records were as follows:

Records before the 2002 Commonwealth Games
Record	Time (s)	Athlete (nation)	Meet	Location	Date	Ref
World record	3:26.00	Hicham El Guerrouj (MAR)	Golden Gala	Rome, Italy	14 July 1998	
Commonwealth record	3:26.34	Bernard Lagat (KEN)	Memorial Van Damme	Brussels, Belgium	24 August 2001	
Games record	3:32.16	Filbert Bayi (TAN)	Commonwealth Games	Christchurch, New Zealand	2 February 1974	

== Results ==
=== Heats ===
The heats were held on 30 July, starting at 18:45 in the evening.

Qualification Rules: First 4 in each heat (Q) and the best 4 of remaining athletes (q) advance to the final.

==== Heat 1 ====
Results of heat 1
Rank	Athlete	Nation	Time	Notes
1	William Chirchir	Kenya	3:46.75	Q
2	Youcef Abdi	Australia	3:46.79	Q
3	Michael East	England	3:46.90	Q
4	Kevin Sullivan	Canada	3:47.21	Q
5	Jon McCallum	Scotland	3:47.37	q
6	Matthew Shone	Wales	3:47.83	
7	Nickie Peters	Saint Vincent and the Grenadines	3:53.09	PB
8	Michael Tomlin	Jamaica	3:54.50	
9	Jimmy Sandy Sam	Vanuatu	4:13.15	

==== Heat 2 ====
Results of heat 2
Rank	Athlete	Nation	Time	Notes
1	Anthony Whiteman	England	3:43.25	Q, SB
2	Julius Achon	Uganda	3:43.32	Q
3	David Kiplak	Kenya	3:43.56	Q
4	Graham Hood	Canada	3:44.88	Q
5	Thomas Mayo	England	3:45.56	q
6	Colm McLean	Northern Ireland	3:45.72	q
7	Francis Munthali	Malawi	3:45.81	q, NR
8	Lee Merrien	Guernsey	3:47.68	
9	Henry Foufaka	Solomon Islands	4:18.39	

=== Final ===
The final was held at 20:10 on 31 July.

Results of the final
Rank	Athlete	Nation	Time	Notes
1st place, gold medalist(s)	Michael East	England	3:37.35	PB
2nd place, silver medalist(s)	William Chirchir	Kenya	3:37.70	
3rd place, bronze medalist(s)	Youcef Abdi	Australia	3:37.77	
4	Anthony Whiteman	England	3:38.04	SB
5	Graham Hood	Canada	3:38.08	SB
6	Julius Achon	Uganda	3:38.33	SB
7	Kevin Sullivan	Canada	3:40.95	SB
8	Thomas Mayo	England	3:41.70	
9	David Kiplak	Kenya	3:42.87	
10	Francis Munthali	Malawi	3:43.50	NR
11	Jon McCallum	Scotland	3:48.02	
12	Colm McLean	Northern Ireland	3:51.90	
