= Athletics at the 1997 Summer Universiade – Men's 1500 metres =

The men's 1500 metres event at the 1997 Summer Universiade was held at the Stadio Cibali in Catania, Italy on August 29, 30 and 31.

== Medalists ==
Gold	Silver	Bronze
Anthony Whiteman; Great Britain	Carlos García; Spain	António Travassos; Portugal

== Results ==
=== Heats ===
Rank	Heat	Athlete	Nationality	Time	Notes
1	5	Carlos García	Spain	3:46.31	Q
2	5	Héctor Torres	Mexico	3:46.39	Q
3	5	Karl Paranya	United States	3:46.45	Q
4	5	Abdelhamid Slimani	Algeria	3:46.50	q
5	5	Eyvind Solbu	Norway	3:46.92	q
6	5	Mohamed Fatihi	Morocco	3:48.21	q
7	4	Igor Lishchinskiy	Ukraine	3:48.47	Q
8	4	Andrea Abelli	Italy	3:48.49	Q
9	4	Bård Kvalheim	Norway	3:48.64	Q
10	4	Peter Philipp	Switzerland	3:48.81	q
11	4	Celso Ficagna	Brazil	3:48.85	q
12	4	Alex Hutchinson	Canada	3:49.20	q
13	2	Scott Petersen	Australia	3:49.91	Q
14	3	António Travassos	Portugal	3:50.28	Q
15	2	Nasser Ahmed Sulaiman	Qatar	3:50.45	Q
16	2	Jeremy Deere	Canada	3:50.68	Q
17	3	Ebeneza Felix	South Africa	3:50.68	Q
18	3	Brian Treacy	Ireland	3:50.82	Q
19	3	Michael Gottschalk	Germany	3:50.87	
20	2	Thomas Ebner	Austria	3:51.12	
21	2	Alexis Sharangabo	Rwanda	3:51.89	
22	6	Gert-Jan Liefers	Netherlands	3:52.46	Q
23	6	Piotr Rostkowski	Poland	3:52.56	Q
24	6	Neil Caddy	Great Britain	3:52.62	Q
25	6	Thomas Suter	Switzerland	3:52.68	
26	1	Anthony Whiteman	Great Britain	3:52.81	Q
27	6	Mark Sivieri	United States	3:53.23	
28	1	Đorđe Milić	Yugoslavia	3:53.35	Q
29	1	Chris Bowden	Australia	3:53.80	Q
30	1	Lorenzo Lazzari	Italy	3:53.99	
31	6	Aleš Tomič	Slovenia	3:54.01	
32	1	Alexei Scutaru	Moldova	3:54.54	
33	3	Aziz El-Kahlaoui	Morocco	3:54.76	
34	3	Pedro Antonio Esteso	Spain	3:56.00	
35	6	Vanko Stoyanov	Macedonia	3:57.46	
36	4	Adamou Aboubakar	Cameroon	3:57.47	
37	3	Gilbert Tuhabonye	Burundi	3:58.06	
38	2	Mark Harris	New Zealand	3:59.35	
39	2	Sylvester Simelane	Swaziland	3:59.53	
40	3	Kabemba Mwape	Zambia	3:59.58	
41	2	Mathew Koskei	Kenya	3:59.64	
42	1	Rachid Amor	Tunisia	3:59.66	
43	1	Kim Soon-hyung	South Korea	4:00.12	
44	1	Lesedinyana Lekgoba	Botswana	4:00.50	
45	5	Jean-Paul Niyonsaba	Burundi	4:01.52	
46	3	Rachman Deviandi	Indonesia	4:01.88	
47	6	Nicodemus Rerine	Indonesia	4:02.14	
48	5	Frank Ndela	Swaziland	4:02.18	
49	4	Junior Anguyo	Uganda	4:05.59	
50	6	Christophe Irumwa	Rwanda	4:05.81	
51	1	Fadi Hatamleh	Jordan	4:15.13	
52	3	Ma Wai Hou	Macau	4:16.68	
53	3	Chris Musenze	Uganda	4:18.67	
54	3	Alfadio Traoré	Guinea	4:22.18	
55	4	Tang Win Kin	Hong Kong	4:26.90	
56	5	Noor Aslam	Pakistan	4:30.83	
57	5	Tam Hoi Keng	Macau	4:38.62	
58	5	Shadi Al-Huheidi	Jordan	4:43.38	
59	2	Serge Tohme	Lebanon	4:45.63	
60	2	Victor Jonah	Sierra Leone	4:48.29	

=== Semifinals ===
Rank	Heat	Athlete	Nationality	Time	Notes
1	1	Anthony Whiteman	Great Britain	3:42.20	Q
2	1	Carlos García	Spain	3:42.39	Q
3	1	Đorđe Milić	Yugoslavia	3:42.77	Q
4	1	Igor Lishchinskiy	Ukraine	3:42.89	Q
5	1	Abdelhamid Slimani	Algeria	3:42.97	Q
6	2	António Travassos	Portugal	3:42.98	Q
7	1	Scott Petersen	Australia	3:43.02	q
8	2	Gert-Jan Liefers	Netherlands	3:43.62	Q
9	1	Héctor Torres	Mexico	3:43.66	q
10	2	Ebeneza Felix	South Africa	3:43.75	Q
11	2	Brian Treacy	Ireland	3:43.87	Q
12	2	Piotr Rostkowski	Poland	3:43.98	Q
13	2	Chris Bowden	Australia	3:44.19	
14	2	Peter Philipp	Switzerland	3:44.33	
15	1	Mohamed Fatihi	Morocco	3:44.53	
16	1	Karl Paranya	United States	3:45.11	
17	1	Jeremy Deere	Canada	3:45.61	
18	2	Celso Ficagna	Brazil	3:46.69	
19	2	Neil Caddy	Great Britain	3:47.64	
20	2	Alex Hutchinson	Canada	3:50.26	
21	1	Bård Kvalheim	Norway	3:53.42	
22	2	Andrea Abelli	Italy	3:54.59	
	2	Eyvind Solbu	Norway	DNF	
	1	Nasser Ahmed Sulaiman	Qatar	?	

=== Final ===
Rank	Athlete	Nationality	Time	Notes
1st place, gold medalist(s)	Anthony Whiteman	Great Britain	3:43.57	
2nd place, silver medalist(s)	Carlos García	Spain	3:43.97	
3rd place, bronze medalist(s)	António Travassos	Portugal	3:44.14	
4	Brian Treacy	Ireland	3:45.26	
5	Igor Lishchinskiy	Ukraine	3:45.67	
6	Gert-Jan Liefers	Netherlands	3:46.09	
7	Đorđe Milić	Yugoslavia	3:46.32	
8	Héctor Torres	Mexico	3:46.35	
9	Scott Petersen	Australia	3:46.66	
10	Ebeneza Felix	South Africa	3:47.03	
11	Piotr Rostkowski	Poland	3:48.34	
12	Abdelhamid Slimani	Algeria	3:50.24	
