= Athletics at the 2002 Asian Games – Men's 800 metres =

Men's 800 metres at the 2002 Asian Games
- Venue: Busan Asiad Main Stadium
- Dates: 8–9 October 2002
- Competitors: 17 from 14 nations

Medalists
gold medal	Rashid Mohamed	Bahrain
silver medal	K. M. Binu	India
bronze medal	Li Huiquan	China

The men's 800 metres competition at the 2002 Asian Games in Busan, South Korea was held on 8–9 October at the Busan Asiad Main Stadium.

== Schedule ==
All times are Korea Standard Time (UTC+09:00)

Date	Time	Event
Tuesday, 8 October 2002	15:00	1st round
Wednesday, 9 October 2002	15:30	Final

== Records ==
Prior to this competition, the existing world, Asian and Games records were as follows.

World Record	Wilson Kipketer (DEN)	1:41.11	Cologne, Germany	24 August 1997
Asian Record	Lee Jin-il (KOR)	1:44.14	Seoul, South Korea	17 June 1994
Games Record	Lee Jin-il (KOR)	1:45.72	Hiroshima, Japan	12 October 1994

== Results ==
=== 1st round ===
- Qualification: First 3 in each heat (Q) and the next 2 fastest (q) advance to the final.

==== Heat 1 ====
Rank	Athlete	Time	Notes
1	Li Huiquan (CHN)	1:47.61	Q
2	K. M. Binu (IND)	1:47.63	Q
3	Erkinjon Isakov (UZB)	1:47.69	Q
4	Kim Soon-hyung (KOR)	1:47.95	q
5	Salem Amer Al-Badri (QAT)	1:48.49	q
6	Abdulkabeer Loraibi (BRN)	1:48.63	
7	Hiroshi Sasano (JPN)	1:49.51	
8	Bashar Al-Kufrini (JOR)	1:51.08	

==== Heat 2 ====
Rank	Athlete	Time	Notes
1	Rashid Mohamed (BRN)	1:48.67	Q
2	Mikhail Kolganov (KAZ)	1:48.75	Q
3	Adam Abdu Adam (QAT)	1:48.94	Q
4	Mehdi Jelodarzadeh (IRI)	1:49.13	
5	Salah Fadlallah (KSA)	1:49.73	
6	Lee Jae-hun (KOR)	1:50.24	
7	Abdalsalam Al-Dabaji (PLE)	1:50.58	
8	John Lozada (PHI)	1:51.09	
9	Pich Kong (CAM)	2:07.89	

=== Final ===
Rank	Athlete	Time	Notes
1st place, gold medalist(s)	Rashid Mohamed (BRN)	1:47.12	
2nd place, silver medalist(s)	K. M. Binu (IND)	1:47.57	
3rd place, bronze medalist(s)	Li Huiquan (CHN)	1:47.77	
4	Mikhail Kolganov (KAZ)	1:47.89	
5	Adam Abdu Adam (QAT)	1:48.01	
6	Salem Amer Al-Badri (QAT)	1:48.07	
7	Erkinjon Isakov (UZB)	1:48.39	
8	Kim Soon-hyung (KOR)	1:48.60	
