= 2003 Asian Athletics Championships – Men's 800 metres =

The men's 800 metres event at the 2003 Asian Athletics Championships was held in Manila, Philippines on September 22–23.

== Medalists ==
Gold	Silver	Bronze
Adam Abdu Adam Ali; Qatar	Salem Amer Al-Badri; Qatar	Rashid Mohamed; Bahrain

== Results ==
=== Heats ===
Rank	Heat	Name	Nationality	Time	Notes
1	2	Sajjad Moradi	Iran	1:48.50	Q
2	1	Erkinjon Isakov	Uzbekistan	1:48.58	Q
3	2	Salem Amer Al-Badri	Qatar	1:48.71	Q
4	2	Lee Jae-Hun	South Korea	1:48.81	q
5	3	Adam Abdu Adam Ali	Qatar	1:48.85	Q
6	3	Ehsan Mohajer Shojaei	Iran	1:48.97	Q
7	1	Rashid Mohamed	Bahrain	1:49.09	Q
8	3	Hiroshi Sasano	Japan	1:49.18	q
9	3	Redouane Jaddouh	Syria	1:49.97	
10	1	Sasidharan Primesh Kumar	India	1:50.45	
11	1	Chen Fu-Pin	Chinese Taipei	1:50.55	SB
12	1	Mohamed Sifrath	Sri Lanka	1:51.00	
12	2	Abdal Salam Aldabaji	Palestine	1:51.00	
14	3	Irshad Fazal	Pakistan	1:51.51	
15	3	Li Huiquan	China	1:52.31	
16	2	Manoj Pushpakumara	Sri Lanka	1:53.40	
17	1	Saeed Al-Adhreai	Yemen	1:54.03	PB
18	1	Dicky Gunawan	Indonesia	1:54.16	SB
19	2	Prem Bahadur Mahat	Nepal	1:55.95	PB
20	3	Rommel Ragudo	Philippines	1:57.26	PB
21	3	Jimmy Anak Ahar	Brunei	1:58.72	
22	2	Chidambaran Veeramani	Singapore	2:02.44	SB
23	1	Abdullah Ibrahim	Maldives	2:09.62	PB

=== Final ===
Rank	Name	Nationality	Time	Notes
1st place, gold medalist(s)	Adam Abdu Adam Ali	Qatar	1:46.20	SB
2nd place, silver medalist(s)	Salem Amer Al-Badri	Qatar	1:46.95	
3rd place, bronze medalist(s)	Rashid Mohamed	Bahrain	1:47.09	
4	Sajjad Moradi	Iran	1:47.38	
5	Erkinjon Isakov	Uzbekistan	1:49.05	
6	Lee Jae-Hun	South Korea	1:50.57	
7	Hiroshi Sasano	Japan	1:56.32	
	Ehsan Mohajer Shojaei	Iran	DNF	
