= 1995 IAAF World Indoor Championships – Men's 1500 metres =

The men's 1500 metres event at the 1995 IAAF World Indoor Championships was held on 10–11 March.

== Medalists ==
Gold	Silver	Bronze
Hicham El Guerrouj; Morocco	Mateo Cañellas; Spain	Erik Nedeau; United States

== Results ==
=== Heats ===
First 4 of each heat (Q) and next 4 fastest (q) qualified for the final.

Rank	Heat	Name	Nationality	Time	Notes
1	2	Rüdiger Stenzel	Germany	3:42.38	Q
2	1	Hicham El Guerrouj	Morocco	3:42.72	Q
3	1	Niall Bruton	Ireland	3:43.00	Q
4	1	Dominique Loser	Germany	3:43.05	Q
5	1	Mateo Cañellas	Spain	3:43.13	Q
6	1	Vyacheslav Shabunin	Russia	3:43.17	q
7	1	Anthony Whiteman	Great Britain	3:44.24	q
8	2	Fermín Cacho	Spain	3:45.05	Q
9	1	Simon Vroemen	Netherlands	3:45.20	q
10	2	Marcus O'Sullivan	Ireland	3:45.27	Q
11	2	Erik Nedeau	United States	3:46.05	Q
12	1	José Valente	Brazil	3:46.18	q
13	2	Rachid El Basir	Morocco	3:47.03	
14	2	Brian Treacy	Great Britain	3:47.18	
15	1	Jason Pyrah	United States	3:48.28	
16	2	Patrik Johansson	Sweden	3:49.81	
17	2	Ali Hakimi	Tunisia	3:50.96	
18	1	Massimo Pegoretti	Italy	3:51.17	
19	2	Francis Munthali	Malawi	3:58.23	NR
	2	Mahdi Abdulla Eldin	Sudan	DQ	R141.3
	2	Andrea Giocondi	Italy	DNF	
	1	João N'Tyamba	Angola	DNS	

=== Final ===
Rank	Name	Nationality	Time	Notes
1st place, gold medalist(s)	Hicham El Guerrouj	Morocco	3:44.54	
2nd place, silver medalist(s)	Mateo Cañellas	Spain	3:44.85	
3rd place, bronze medalist(s)	Erik Nedeau	United States	3:44.91	
4	Niall Bruton	Ireland	3:45.05	
5	Vyacheslav Shabunin	Russia	3:45.40	
6	Fermín Cacho	Spain	3:45.46	
7	Rüdiger Stenzel	Germany	3:45.64	
8	Dominique Loser	Germany	3:46.09	
9	José Valente	Brazil	3:46.71	
10	Marcus O'Sullivan	Ireland	3:47.02	
11	Anthony Whiteman	Great Britain	3:47.50	
12	Simon Vroemen	Netherlands	3:48.39	
