= Athletics at the 1999 Summer Universiade – Men's 1500 metres =

The men's 1500 metres event at the 1999 Summer Universiade was held at the Estadio Son Moix in Palma de Mallorca, Spain on 10, 11 and 13 July.

== Medalists ==
Gold	Silver	Bronze
Bernard Lagat; Kenya	Leszek Zblewski; Poland	Lorenzo Lazzari; Italy

== Results ==
=== Heats ===
Rank	Heat	Athlete	Nationality	Time	Notes
1	2	Bernard Lagat	Kenya	3:47.40	Q
2	2	Gareth Turnbull	Ireland	3:47.52	Q
3	2	Spencer Barden	Great Britain	3:47.74	Q
4	2	Michael Stember	United States	3:47.85	Q
5	2	Lorenzo Lazzari	Italy	3:47.85	Q
6	2	Stephen Willis	New Zealand	3:47.89	Q
7	3	Rachid Boulahdid	Morocco	3:47.98	Q
8	2	Gezachw Yossef	Israel	3:48.04	q
9	2	Igor Lishchynskyy	Ukraine	3:48.11	q
10	3	Peter Philipp	Switzerland	3:48.17	Q
11	3	Mark Gorski	Australia	3:48.36	Q
12	3	Mark Hauser	United States	3:48.45	Q
13	3	Rich Tremain	Canada	3:48.54	Q
14	3	Stanislav Lambev	Bulgaria	3:48.57	Q
15	3	Luis Mezquida	Spain	3:48.57	q
16	2	Hicham Lamalem	Morocco	3:49.65	q
17	2	Alexander Greaux	Puerto Rico	3:52.50	q
18	3	Jhonny Loría	Costa Rica	3:53.39	q
19	2	Soren Helmer	Denmark	3:53.52	
20	1	Đorđe Milić	Yugoslavia	3:57.82	Q
21	2	Xandru Grech	Malta	3:58.40	
22	3	Damien Shirley	New Zealand	3:58.62	
23	1	Paul Cleary	Australia	3:58.76	Q
24	1	Juan José Viña	Spain	3:59.10	Q
25	1	Leszek Zblewski	Poland	3:59.24	Q
26	1	Abednigo Sibandze	Swaziland	3:59.43	Q
27	1	Ronny Bravo	Chile	3:59.76	Q
28	1	Jamal Abdi Hassan	Qatar	4:00.24	
29	1	Ramiro Paris	Argentina	4:03.16	
30	1	Luis Abaya	Costa Rica	4:04.17	
31	1	Rachman Deviandi	Indonesia	4:04.55	
32	1	Gerald Grech	Malta	4:06.18	
33	3	Vullnet Manushi	Albania	4:12.02	
34	3	Manuel Méndez	Argentina	4:13.66	
35	3	Mohamed Berim	Sudan	4:28.25	
	1	Eliud Wainaina	Kenya	DNS	
	1	Daryl Fillion	Canada	DNS	
	2	Alexis Sharangabo	Rwanda	DNS	
	2	Henry Bakumpe	Uganda	DNS	
	3	Wissam Mattar	Lebanon	DNS	

=== Semifinals ===
Rank	Heat	Athlete	Nationality	Time	Notes
1	2	Michael Stember	United States	3:46.78	Q
2	2	Stephen Willis	New Zealand	3:46.94	Q
3	1	Gareth Turnbull	Ireland	3:47.06	Q
4	2	Juan José Viña	Spain	3:47.14	Q
5	2	Igor Lishchynskyy	Ukraine	3:47.16	Q
6	2	Mark Gorski	Australia	3:47.21	Q
7	2	Rachid Boulahdid	Morocco	3:47.26	q, PB
8	2	Spencer Barden	Great Britain	3:47.65	q
9	2	Peter Phillip	Switzerland	3:47.76	
10	1	Bernard Lagat	Kenya	3:48.35	Q
11	1	Paul Cleary	Australia	3:48.54	Q
12	1	Lorenzo Lazzari	Italy	3:48.71	Q
13	1	Leszek Zblewski	Poland	3:49.09	Q
14	1	Hicham Lamalem	Morocco	3:49.68	
15	1	Gezachw Yossef	Israel	3:52.28	
16	1	Luis Mezquida	Spain	3:53.17	
17	2	Stanislav Lambev	Bulgaria	3:53.50	
18	1	Alexander Greaux	Puerto Rico	3:54.26	
19	2	Rich Tremain	Canada	3:54.79	
20	2	Jhonny Loría	Costa Rica	3:55.01	
21	1	Mark Hauser	United States	3:55.59	
22	1	Abednigo Sibandze	Swaziland	3:59.79	
23	1	Đorđe Milić	Yugoslavia	4:03.15	
24	2	Ronny Bravo	Chile	4:03.86	

=== Final ===
Rank	Athlete	Nationality	Time	Notes
1st place, gold medalist(s)	Bernard Lagat	Kenya	3:40.99	
2nd place, silver medalist(s)	Leszek Zblewski	Poland	3:41.81	
3rd place, bronze medalist(s)	Lorenzo Lazzari	Italy	3:42.36	
4	Michael Stember	United States	3:42.99	
5	Stephen Willis	New Zealand	3:43.49	
6	Paul Cleary	Australia	3:44.06	
7	Gareth Turnbull	Ireland	3:44.23	
8	Spencer Barden	Great Britain	3:44.86	
9	Rachid Boulahdid	Morocco	3:46.40	PB
10	Juan José Viña	Spain	3:48.16	
11	Igor Lishchynskyy	Ukraine	3:49.02	
12	Mark Gorski	Australia	3:49.67	
