= Kiyonari =

Kiyonari (清成) is a name of Japanese origin that is used both as a surname and a masculine given name. Notable people with the name include:

== People with the given name ==
- Kiyonari Shibata (柴田 清成, born 1973), Japanese male middle-distance runner
- Yoshida Kiyonari (吉田 清成, died 1891), Japanese samurai and diplomat

== People with the surname ==
- Ryuichi Kiyonari (清成 龍一, born 1982), Japanese professional motorcycle road racer
- Tetsuya Kiyonari (清成 哲也, born 1961), Japanese professional Go player

== See also ==
- Kiyonori, a similar Japanese masculine given name
