= Gezachw Yossef =

Israeli long-distance runner

Personal information
- Native name: גזחב יוסף
- Born: 11 January 1975
- Education: Texas Tech University
- Height: 1.83 m (6 ft 0 in)
- Weight: 64 kg (141 lb)

Sport
- Sport: Athletics
- Event: 5000 metres
- Club: Maccabi Tel-Aviv

Gezachw Yossef (Hebrew: גזחב יוסף; born 11 January 1975) is an Israeli long-distance runner. He represented his country at the 2010 World Indoor Championships narrowly missing the final.

== International competitions ==
Year	Competition	Venue	Position	Event	Notes
Representing Israel
1997	European U23 Championships	Turku, Finland	22nd (h)	1500 m	3:54.47
1999	Universiade	Palma de Mallorca, Spain	? (h)	800 m	1:50.24
1999	Universiade	Palma de Mallorca, Spain	15th (h)	1500 m	3:52.28
2009	European Indoor Championships	Turin, Italy	–	1500 m	DNF
2009	European Indoor Championships	Turin, Italy	8th	3000 m	8:01.78
2010	World Indoor Championships	Doha, Qatar	13th (h)	3000 m	8:03.62
2010	European Championships	Barcelona, Spain	20th (h)	5000 m	13:55.97

== Personal bests ==
Outdoor

- 800 metres – 1:47.91 (Namur 1998)
- 1500 metres – 3:40.90 (Uden 2009)
- 3000 metres – 7:51.40 (Liège 2009)
- 5000 metres – 13:31.45 (Heusden-Zolder 2009)
- 10,000 metres – 28:37.48 (Tel Aviv 2010)
- 3000 metres steeplechase – 10:10.86 (Dubnica nad Váhom 2015)
- Half marathon – 1:07:11 (Tel Aviv 2008)
- Marathon – 2:15:07 (Prague 2012)

Indoor

- 800 metres – 1:51.73 (Indianapolis 2000)
- 1000 metres – 2:24.49 (Columbia 1998)
- One mile – 4:03.52 (Fayetteville 2000)
- 3000 metres – 7:59.44 (Turin 2009)
- 5000 metres – 14:17.81 (Birmingham 2011)
