= 1992 World Junior Championships in Athletics – Men's 1500 metres =

The men's 1500 metres event at the 1992 World Junior Championships in Athletics was held in Seoul, South Korea, at Olympic Stadium on 18 and 20 September.

== Medalists ==
Gold	Atoi Boru; Kenya
Silver	Vénuste Niyongabo; Burundi
Bronze	Kevin Sullivan; Canada

== Results ==
=== Final ===
20 September

Rank	Name	Nationality	Time	Notes
1st place, gold medalist(s)	Atoi Boru	Kenya	3:37.94	
2nd place, silver medalist(s)	Vénuste Niyongabo	Burundi	3:38.59	
3rd place, bronze medalist(s)	Kevin Sullivan	Canada	3:39.11	
4	Kim Soon-Hyung	South Korea	3:40.26	
5	Eddie Crowe	New Zealand	3:40.82	
6	Javier Rodríguez	Spain	3:40.94	
7	Dominique Löser	Germany	3:41.47	
8	Yusuke Fujiwaki	Japan	3:42.02	
9	Mohamed Belasri	Morocco	3:43.60	
10	Carlo Barbieri	Italy	3:51.41	
11	Hailu Zewde	Ethiopia	3:52.02	
12	Matt Hibberd	United Kingdom	3:58.06	

=== Heats ===
18 September

==== Heat 1 ====
Rank	Name	Nationality	Time	Notes
1	Atoi Boru	Kenya	3:41.58	Q
2	Vénuste Niyongabo	Burundi	3:42.74	Q
3	Eddie Crowe	New Zealand	3:43.02	Q
4	Kevin Sullivan	Canada	3:43.17	Q
5	Javier Rodríguez	Spain	3:43.43	Q
6	Yusuke Fujiwaki	Japan	3:44.05	q
7	Carlo Barbieri	Italy	3:44.47	q
8	Mitiku Megersa	Ethiopia	3:44.85	
9	David Robertson	United Kingdom	3:46.47	
10	Wieslaw Czajka	Poland	3:48.05	
11	Jörg Söllner	Germany	3:49.20	
12	Ahmed Krama	Algeria	3:58.25	
13	Lennox Ellis	Barbados	3:58.57	
	Lee Jin-Il	South Korea	DNF	

==== Heat 2 ====
Rank	Name	Nationality	Time	Notes
1	Hailu Zewde	Ethiopia	3:44.80	Q
2	Dominique Löser	Germany	3:44.86	Q
3	Kim Soon-Hyung	South Korea	3:44.86	Q
4	Mohamed Belasri	Morocco	3:44.88	Q
5	Matt Hibberd	United Kingdom	3:44.91	Q
6	Ali Hakimi	Tunisia	3:44.93	
7	Andrzej Gromadzinski	Poland	3:45.73	
8	Masamoto Kobayashi	Japan	3:46.27	
9	Hamisi Kassim	Tanzania	3:46.88	
10	Balázs Tölgyesi	Hungary	3:48.73	
11	Francisco Ferrando	Spain	3:49.26	
12	Igor Lishchinskiy	Commonwealth of Independent States	3:49.67	
13	Fikre Wondafrash	Ethiopia	3:50.74	
14	Paul Chemase	Kenya	3:55.13	

== Participation ==
According to an unofficial count, 28 athletes from 19 countries participated in the event.

- Algeria (1)
- Barbados (1)
- Burundi (1)
- Canada (1)
- Commonwealth of Independent States (1)
- Ethiopia (3)
- Germany (2)
- Hungary (1)
- Italy (1)
- Japan (2)
- Kenya (2)
- Morocco (1)
- New Zealand (1)
- Poland (2)
- South Korea (2)
- Spain (2)
- Tanzania (1)
- Tunisia (1)
- United Kingdom (2)
