= Paul Cleary =

Paul Cleary may refer to:

- Paul Cleary (American football) (1922–1996), American football end
- Paul Cleary (athlete) (born 1976), Australian retired middle-distance runner
