= 1994 World Junior Championships in Athletics – Men's 20 kilometres road run =

1994 international road race

The men's 20 kilometres road run event at the 1994 World Junior Championships in Athletics was held in Lisbon, Portugal, on 24 July.

== Medalists ==
Gold	Clodoaldo da Silva; Brazil
Silver	Carlos García; Spain
Bronze	Antonello Landi; Italy

== Results ==
=== Final ===
24 July

Rank	Name	Nationality	Time	Notes
1st place, gold medalist(s)	Clodoaldo da Silva	Brazil	1:03:21	
2nd place, silver medalist(s)	Carlos García	Spain	1:03:38	
3rd place, bronze medalist(s)	Antonello Landi	Italy	1:03:40	
4	Isidoro Martínez	Mexico	1:04:05	
5	José María Prieto	Spain	1:04:11	
6	Chryssovalantis Athanassiou	Greece	1:04:18	
7	Zsolt Bácskai	Hungary	1:04:24	
8	Mohamed Al-Oqadi	Saudi Arabia	1:04:25	
9	Anton Nikolesko	Russia	1:04:36	
10	Juan Delgado	Mexico	1:04:54	
11	Fabio Biscola	Brazil	1:05:14	
12	Manuel Magalhães	Portugal	1:05:39	
13	Andreas Stoffer	Germany	1:06:30	
14	Marc Lawson	United States	1:06:47	
15	Robert Busquaert	United States	1:09:57	
	António Janeiro	Portugal	DNF	

== Participation ==
According to an unofficial count, 16 athletes from 11 countries participated in the event.

- Brazil (2)
- Germany (1)
- Greece (1)
- Hungary (1)
- Italy (1)
- Mexico (2)
- Portugal (2)
- Russia (1)
- Saudi Arabia (1)
- Spain (2)
- United States (2)
