= Chunga =

Chunga may refer to:

- Chunga (bird), a genus of birds
- La Chunga (1938–2025), Spanish flamenco dancer and painter
- Chunga Lagoon, a natural feature in Zambia's Lochinvar National Park
- La Chunga, a thoroughbred filly who won the 2005 British Albany Stakes
- Chunga, a small mutant Gypsy vacuum cleaner, the putative namesake of the album Chunga's Revenge by Frank Zappa
- Nieves Cuesta or La Chuncga, a character on Aquí no hay quien viva
- The chunga palm, Astrocaryum standleyanum

== People with the surname ==
- Bernard Chunga, former Chief Justice of Kenya
- Moses Chunga, Zimbabwean retired footballer

== See also ==
- Chungus (disambiguation)
