= Mikhail Kolganov =

Mikhail Kolganov may refer to:

- Michael Kolganov, Israeli canoer
- Mihail Kolganov, Kazakhstani runner
