= Athletics at the 2000 Summer Olympics – Men's 1500 metres =

Men's 1500 metres at the Games of the XXVII Olympiad
- Olympic Athletics
- Venue: Stadium Australia
- Date: 25 September 2000 (heats); 27 September 2000 (semi-finals); 29 September 2000 (final)
- Competitors: 41 from 26 nations
- Winning time: 3:32.07 OR

Medalists
1st place, gold medalist(s)		Noah Ngeny; Kenya
2nd place, silver medalist(s)		Hicham El Guerrouj; Morocco
3rd place, bronze medalist(s)		Bernard Lagat; Kenya

The 1500 metres at the 2000 Summer Olympics as part of the athletics programme were held at Stadium Australia on Monday 25 September, Wednesday 27 September, and Friday 29 September 2000. Forty-one athletes from 26 nations competed. The maximum number of athletes per nation had been set at 3 since the 1930 Olympic Congress. The event was won by 0.25 seconds by Noah Ngeny of Kenya, the nation's first title in the event since 1988 and third overall. Hicham El Guerrouj of Morocco took second, matching the nation's best result in the event (Rachid El Basir's silver in 1992).

== Summary ==
World record holder Hicham El Guerrouj was the clear favorite coming into the race, but he had a reputation for setting records in races set up by a pacemaker. His countryman Youssef Baba provided the service, sacrificing his own ambition in the final, he took the pace out in 54.14, the two Moroccan teammates leading the two Kenyan challengers Noah Ngeny and Bernard Lagat, separating from the rest of the field. On the second lap the pace lagged to 60.63, letting the other runners back in. Baba disappeared quickly leaving El Guerrouj to burn off the Kenyans taking the third lap in 56.90. But the Kenyans remained close with Mehdi Baala a step behind. Through the final turn Ngeny executed a textbook kick, moving onto El Guerrouj's shoulder, sliding into the second lane and sprinting past him for the gold. Lagat moved into lane 3 with hopes of passing as well but ran out of real estate to take the bronze.

== Background ==
This was the 24th appearance of the event, which is one of 12 athletics events to have been held at every Summer Olympics. Five finalists from 1996 returned: gold medalist Noureddine Morceli of Algeria, seventh-place finisher Marko Koers of the Netherlands, tenth-place finisher Driss Maazouzi of Morocco, eleventh-place finisher John Mayock of Great Britain, and twelfth-place finisher Hicham El Guerrouj of Morocco. El Guerrouj had been disappointed by the finish in Atlanta; expected to challenge for gold, he had tripped and fallen. Since the 1996 Games, he had won both world championships (1997 and 1999) and broken the world record; "[m]any people were calling [him] the greatest miler in history."

For the first time, no nations made their debut in the 1500 metres. The United States made its 23rd appearance, most of all nations (having missed only the boycotted 1980 Games).

== Qualification ==
Each National Olympic Committee was permitted to enter up to three athletes that had run 3:36.80 or faster during the qualification period. The maximum number of athletes per nation had been set at 3 since the 1930 Olympic Congress. If an NOC had no athletes that qualified under that standard, one athlete that had run 3:39.50 or faster could be entered.

== Competition format ==
The competition was again three rounds (used previously in 1952 and since 1964). The "fastest loser" system introduced in 1964 was used for both the first round and semifinals. The 12-man semifinals and finals introduced in 1984 and used since 1992 were retained.

The field was smaller than before; there were three heats in the first round, each with 13 or 14 runners. The top six runners in each heat, along with the next six fastest overall, advanced to the semifinals. The 24 semifinalists were divided into two semifinals, each with 12 runners. The top five men in each semifinal, plus the next two fastest overall, advanced to the 12-man final.

== Records ==
These were the standing world and Olympic records prior to the 2000 Summer Olympics.

World record	Hicham El Guerrouj (MAR)	3:26.00	Rome, Italy	14 July 1998
Olympic record	Sebastian Coe (GBR)	3:32.53	Los Angeles, United States	11 August 1984

The 16-year-old Olympic record fell to Noah Ngeny in the final, who set a new record at 3:32.07. All three medalists came in under the old record time.

The following national records were established during the competition:

Nation	Athlete	Round	Time
Malawi	Francis Munthali	Heat 1	3:46.34

== Schedule ==
All times are Australian Eastern Standard Time (UTC+10)

Date	Time	Round
Monday, 25 September 2000	10:40	Round 1
Wednesday, 27 September 2000	18:30	Semifinals
Friday, 29 September 2000	20:00	Final

== Results ==
=== Round 1 ===
==== Heat 1 ====
Rank	Lane	Athlete	Nation	Time	Notes
1	1	Hicham El Guerrouj	Morocco	3:38.57	Q
2	7	Jose Antonio Redolat	Spain	3:38.66	Q
3	10	Kamel Boulahfane	Algeria	3:39.01	Q
4	3	John Mayock	Great Britain	3:39.08	Q
5	8	Hailu Mekonnen	Ethiopia	3:39.09	Q
6	12	Michael Stember	United States	3:39:13	Q
7	6	Julius Achon	Uganda	3:39.40	q
8	5	William Chirchir	Kenya	3:40.22	
9	13	James Nolan	Ireland	3:40.50	
10	11	Darko Radomirović	FR Yugoslavia	3:43.57	
11	4	Nick Howarth	Australia	3:45.46	
12	9	Branko Zorko	Croatia	3:46.16	
13	1	Francis Munthali	Malawi	3:46.34	NR

==== Heat 2 ====
Rank	Lane	Athlete	Nation	Time	Notes
1	3	Mehdi Baala	France	3:40.35	Q
2	5	Bernard Lagat	Kenya	3:40.42	Q
3	1	Juan Carlos Higuero	Spain	3:40.60	Q
4	12	Kevin Sullivan	Canada	3:40.80	Q
5	2	Daniel Zegeye	Ethiopia	3:40.91	Q
6	14	Gabriel Jennings	United States	3:40:96	Q
7	13	Adil Kaouch	Morocco	3:41.06	
8	6	Mohamed Khaldi	Algeria	3:41.16	
9	7	Vyacheslav Shabunin	Russia	3:41.52	
10	9	Ivan Heshko	Ukraine	3:41.80	
11	8	Alexis Sharangabo	Rwanda	3:44.06	
12	11	Chungu Chipako	Zambia	3:49.79	
13	4	José Luis Ebatela Nvo	Equatorial Guinea	4:06.14	
—	4	Anthony Whiteman	Great Britain	DNF	

==== Heat 3 ====
Rank	Lane	Athlete	Nation	Time	Notes
1	7	Noah Ngeny	Kenya	3:38.03	Q
2	14	Noureddine Morceli	Algeria	3:38.41	Q
3	3	Andrés Manuel Díaz	Spain	3:38.54	Q
4	1	Youssef Baba	Morocco	3:38.68	Q
5	4	Berhanu Alemu	Ethiopia	3:38.79	Q
6	5	Driss Maazouzi	France	3:38:88	Q
7	13	Jason Pyrah	United States	3:38.94	q
8	9	Marko Koers	Netherlands	3:39.16	q
9	12	Mohammed Yagoub	Sudan	3:39.52	q
10	2	Hudson de Souza	Brazil	3:39.70	q
11	6	Andrew Graffin	Great Britain	3:39:75	q
12	11	Ibrahim Mohamud Aden Gedi	Somalia	3:40.33	
13	10	Rui Silva	Portugal	3:41.93	
14	8	Sidi Mohamed Ould Bidjel	Mauritania	4:03.74	PB

==== Overall results for Round 1 ====
Rank	Athlete	Nation	Heat	Lane	Place	Time	Notes
1	Noah Ngeny	Kenya	3	7	1	3:38.03	Q
2	Noureddine Morceli	Algeria	3	14	2	3:38.41	Q
3	Andrés Manuel Díaz	Spain	3	3	3	3:38.54	Q
4	Hicham El Guerrouj	Morocco	1	1	1	3:38.57	Q
5	Jose Antonio Redolat	Spain	1	7	2	3:38.66	Q
6	Youssef Baba	Morocco	3	1	4	3:38.68	Q
7	Berhanu Alemu	Ethiopia	3	4	5	3:38.79	Q
8	Driss Maazouzi	France	3	5	6	3:38:88	Q
9	Jason Pyrah	United States	3	13	7	3:38.94	q
10	Kamel Boulahfane	Algeria	1	10	3	3:39.01	Q
11	John Mayock	Great Britain	1	3	4	3:39.08	Q
12	Hailu Mekonnen	Ethiopia	1	8	5	3:39.09	Q
13	Michael Stember	United States	1	12	6	3:39:13	Q
14	Marko Koers	Netherlands	3	9	8	3:39.16	q
15	Julius Achon	Uganda	1	6	7	3:39.40	q
16	Mohammed Yagoub	Sudan	3	12	9	3:39.52	q
17	Hudson de Souza	Brazil	3	2	10	3:39.70	q
18	Andrew Graffin	Great Britain	3	6	11	3:39:75	q
19	William Chirchir	Kenya	1	5	8	3:40.22	
20	Ibrahim Mohamud Aden Gedi	Somalia	3	11	12	3:40.33	
21	Mehdi Baala	France	2	3	1	3:40.35	Q
22	Bernard Lagat	Kenya	2	5	2	3:40.42	Q
23	James Nolan	Ireland	1	13	9	3:40.50	
24	Juan Carlos Higuero	Spain	2	1	3	3:40.60	Q
25	Kevin Sullivan	Canada	2	12	4	3:40.80	Q
26	Daniel Zegeye	Ethiopia	2	2	5	3:40.91	Q
27	Gabriel Jennings	United States	2	14	6	3:40.96	Q
28	Adil Kaouch	Morocco	2	13	7	3:41.06	
29	Mohamed Khaldi	Algeria	2	6	8	3:41.16	
30	Vyacheslav Shabunin	Russia	2	7	9	3:41.52	
31	Ivan Heshko	Ukraine	2	9	10	3:41.80	
32	Rui Silva	Portugal	3	10	13	3:41.93	
33	Darko Radomirović	FR Yugoslavia	1	11	10	3:43.57	
34	Alexis Sharangabo	Rwanda	2	8	11	3:44.06	
35	Nick Howarth	Australia	1	4	11	3:45.46	
36	Branko Zorko	Croatia	1	9	12	3:46.16	
37	Francis Munthali	Malawi	1	1	13	3:46.34	NR
38	Chungu Chipako	Zambia	2	11	12	3:49.79	
39	Sidi Mohamed Ould Bidjel	Mauritania	3	8	14	4:03.74	PB
40	Jose Luis Ebatela Nvo	Equatorial Guinea	2	4	13	4:06.14	
—	Anthony Whiteman	Great Britain	2	10	—	DNF	

=== Semifinals ===
==== Semifinal 1 ====
Rank	Lane	Athlete	Nation	Time	Notes
1	12	Noah Ngeny	Kenya	3:39.29	Q
2	2	Kevin Sullivan	Canada	3:39.66	Q
3	11	Jason Pyrah	United States	3:40.04	Q
4	9	Youssef Baba	Morocco	3:40.16	Q
5	8	Driss Maazouzi	France	3:40.23	Q
6	6	Julius Achon	Uganda	3:40:32	
7	10	Hailu Mekonnen	Ethiopia	3:49.92	
8	3	Hudson de Souza	Brazil	3:41.00	
9	1	Michael Stember	United States	3:42.30	
10	7	Andrew Graffin	Great Britain	3:42.72	
11	5	Jose Antonio Redolat	Spain	3:45.46	
12	4	Noureddine Morceli	Algeria	4:00.78	

==== Semifinal 2 ====
Rank	Lane	Athlete	Nation	Time	Notes
1	6	Hicham El Guerrouj	Morocco	3:37.60	Q
2	10	Bernard Lagat	Kenya	3:37.84	Q
3	11	Daniel Zegeye	Ethiopia	3:38.08	Q
4	4	Mehdi Baala	France	3:38.15	Q
5	12	Juan Carlos Higuero	Spain	3:38.37	Q
6	2	Andrés Manuel Díaz	Spain	3:38:41	q
7	5	John Mayock	Great Britain	3:38.68	q
8	7	Marko Koers	Netherlands	3:39.42	
9	9	Gabriel Jennings	United States	3:40.10	
10	3	Berhanu Alemu	Ethiopia	3:41.09	
11	1	Kamel Boulahfane	Algeria	3:43.98	
12	8	Mohammed Yagoub	Sudan	3:50.60	

==== Overall results for semifinals ====
Rank	Athlete	Nation	Heat	Lane	Place	Time	Notes
1	Hicham El Guerrouj	Morocco	2	6	1	3:37.60	Q
2	Bernard Lagat	Kenya	2	10	2	3:37.84	Q
3	Daniel Zegeye	Ethiopia	2	11	3	3:38.08	Q
4	Mehdi Baala	France	2	4	4	3:38.15	Q
5	Juan Carlos Higuero	Spain	2	12	5	3:38.37	Q
6	Andrés Manuel Díaz	Spain	2	2	6	3:38.41	q
7	John Mayock	Great Britain	2	5	7	3:38.68	q
8	Noah Ngeny	Kenya	1	12	1	3:39:29	Q
9	Marko Koers	Netherlands	2	7	8	3:39.42	
10	Kevin Sullivan	Canada	1	2	2	3:39.66	Q
11	Jason Pyrah	United States	1	11	3	3:40.04	Q
12	Gabriel Jennings	United States	2	9	9	3:40.10	
13	Youssef Baba	Morocco	1	9	4	3:40:16	Q
14	Driss Maazouzi	France	1	8	5	3:40.23	Q
15	Julius Achon	Uganda	1	6	6	3:40.32	
16	Hailu Mekonnen	Ethiopia	1	10	7	3:40.92	
17	Hudson de Souza	Brazil	1	3	8	3:41.00	
18	Berhanu Alemu	Ethiopia	2	3	10	3:41:09	
19	Michael Stember	United States	1	1	9	3:42.30	
20	Andrew Graffin	Great Britain	1	7	10	3:42.72	
21	Kamel Boulahfane	Algeria	2	1	11	3:43.98	
22	Jose Antonio Redolat	Spain	1	5	11	3:45.46	
23	Mohammed Yagoub	Sudan	2	8	12	3:50.60	
24	Noureddine Morceli	Algeria	1	4	12	4:00.78	

=== Final ===
Rank	Lane	Athlete	Nation	Time	Notes
1st place, gold medalist(s)	11	Noah Ngeny	Kenya	3:32.07	OR
2nd place, silver medalist(s)	1	Hicham El Guerrouj	Morocco	3:32.32	
3rd place, bronze medalist(s)	7	Bernard Lagat	Kenya	3:32.44	
4	8	Mehdi Baala	France	3:34.14	
5	2	Kevin Sullivan	Canada	3:35.50	
6	3	Daniel Zegeye	Ethiopia	3:36.78	
7	10	Andrés Manuel Díaz	Spain	3:37.27	
8	4	Juan Carlos Higuero	Spain	3:38.91	
9	5	John Mayock	Great Britain	3:39.41	
10	6	Jason Pyrah	United States	3:39.84	
11	12	Driss Maazouzi	France	3:45.46	
12	9	Youssef Baba	Morocco	3:56.08	
