= Athletics at the 1998 Asian Games – Men's 1500 metres =

Men's 1500 metres at the 1998 Asian Games
- Venue: Thammasat Stadium
- Dates: 13–14 December 1998
- Competitors: 16 from 11 nations

Medalists
gold medal	Mohamed Suleiman	Qatar
silver medal	Kim Soon-hyung	South Korea
bronze medal	Bahadur Prasad	India

The men's 1500 metres competition at the 1998 Asian Games in Bangkok, Thailand was held on 13–14 December at the Thammasat Stadium.

== Schedule ==
All times are Indochina Time (UTC+07:00)

Date	Time	Event
Sunday, 13 December 1998	16:00	Heats
Monday, 14 December 1998	15:35	Final

== Results ==
=== Heats ===
- Qualification: First 4 in each heat (Q) and the next 4 fastest (q) advance to the final.

==== Heat 1 ====
Rank	Athlete	Time	Notes
1	Mohamed Suleiman (QAT)	3:50.43	Q
2	Kiyoharu Sato (JPN)	3:50.64	Q
3	Bahadur Prasad (IND)	3:51.00	Q
4	Farhad Heidari (IRI)	3:51.12	Q
5	Cheng Bing (CHN)	3:51.13	q
6	Chern Srichudanu (THA)	3:53.79	q
7	Gyan Bahadur Bohara (NEP)	3:54.64	q
8	Phan Văn Hoá (VIE)	4:01.26	

==== Heat 2 ====
Rank	Athlete	Time	Notes
1	Kim Soon-hyung (KOR)	3:53.93	Q
2	Kiyonari Shibata (JPN)	3:54.35	Q
3	Song Mingyou (CHN)	3:54.91	Q
4	Osman Ahmed Taib (QAT)	3:56.26	Q
5	Lalith Galappaththi (SRI)	3:56.82	q
6	Bishnu Bahadur Rana (NEP)	3:58.80	
7	Mohammad Al-Matari (JOR)	3:59.30	
8	Phichit Julchanpo (THA)	3:59.65	

=== Final ===
Rank	Athlete	Time	Notes
1st place, gold medalist(s)	Mohamed Suleiman (QAT)	3:40.03	
2nd place, silver medalist(s)	Kim Soon-hyung (KOR)	3:40.56	
3rd place, bronze medalist(s)	Bahadur Prasad (IND)	3:41.48	
4	Kiyoharu Sato (JPN)	3:43.26	
5	Farhad Heidari (IRI)	3:45.01	
6	Song Mingyou (CHN)	3:46.32	
7	Kiyonari Shibata (JPN)	3:47.87	
8	Chern Srichudanu (THA)	3:48.21	
9	Cheng Bing (CHN)	3:48.95	
10	Osman Ahmed Taib (QAT)	3:50.56	
11	Gyan Bahadur Bohara (NEP)	3:50.80	
12	Lalith Galappaththi (SRI)	3:51.22	
