= Chungu =

Chungu may refer to:

== People ==
- Lawrence Chungu (born 1991), Zambian football player
- Steven Chungu (born 1969), Zambian boxer
- Chungu Chipako (born 1971), Zambian middle-distance runner

== Other uses ==
- Chungu, a minor character from The Lion Guard

== See also ==
- Chungus (disambiguation)
