= Đorđe Milić =

Đorđe Milić may refer to:

- Đorđe Milić (footballer) (born 1943), Yugoslav and Serbian football player and manager
- Đorđe Milić (runner) (born 1972), Serbian middle-distance runner
