= Salem Amer Al-Badri =

Qatari middle-distance runner

Medal record

Men's athletics

Representing Qatar

Asian Championships
Silver medal – second place	2002 Colombo	800 m
Silver medal – second place	2003 Manila	800 m

Asian Indoor Championships
Gold medal – first place	2006 Pattaya	800 m

Salem Amer Al-Badri (birth name Moses Chirchir; born 12 December 1985 in Kenya) is a retired middle-distance runner who competed internationally for Qatar mostly in the 800 metres event. He jointly holds the Asian record in the rarely contested 4 × 800 metres relay, along with his teammates Majed Saeed Sultan, Abdulrahman Suleiman and Abubaker Ali Kamal.

Al-Badri's 800 metres personal bests are 1:45.45 seconds outdoors and 1:50.93 indoors, both set in 2006.

== Competition record ==
Year	Competition	Venue	Position	Event	Notes
Representing Qatar
2000	Asian Championships	Jakarta, Indonesia	6th	800 m	1:52.43
2000	World Junior Championships	Santiago, Chile	4th	800m	1:48.51
2001	World Youth Championships	Debrecen, Hungary	1st	800 m	1:50.15
2001	Asian Junior Championships	Bandar Seri Begawan, Brunei	1st	800 m	1:51.15
2002	West Asian Games	Kuwait City, Kuwait	2nd	800 m	1:49.70
2002	World Junior Championships	Kingston, Jamaica	2nd	800 m	1:46.63
2002	Asian Championships	Colombo, Sri Lanka	2nd	800 m	1:48.95
2002	Asian Games	Busan, South Korea	6th	800 m	1:48.07
2003	Asian Championships	Manila, Philippines	2nd	800 m	1:46.95
2004	Asian Junior Championships	Ipoh, Malaysia	1st	800 m	1:50.52
2005	Asian Indoor Games	Pattaya, Thailand	2nd	800 m	1:52.27
2005	Asian Indoor Games	Pattaya, Thailand	3rd	4 × 400 m relay	3:21.40
2006	Asian Indoor Championships	Pattaya, Thailand	1st	800 m	1:50.93
2006	Asian Games	Doha, Qatar	8th (h)	800 m	1:52.73
2006	Asian Games	Doha, Qatar	–	4 × 400 m relay	DQ
