= Athletics at the 1995 Summer Universiade – Men's 1500 metres =

The men's 1500 metres event at the 1995 Summer Universiade was held on 1–3 September at the Hakatanomori Athletic Stadium in Fukuoka, Japan.

== Medalists ==
Gold	Silver	Bronze
Abdelkader Chékhémani; France	Andrea Giocondi; Italy	Abdelhamid Slimani; Algeria

== Results ==
=== Heats ===
Qualification: First 4 of each heat (Q) and the next 4 fastest (q) qualified for the semifinals.

Rank	Heat	Athlete	Nationality	Time	Notes
1	1	Allan Klassen	Canada	3:48.35	Q
2	1	Brian Treacy	Great Britain	3:48.74	Q
3	1	Piotr Rostkowski	Poland	3:48.76	Q
4	1	Cristian Orza	Romania	3:49.20	Q
5	1	Abderrahim Maarouf	Morocco	3:49.72	q
6	1	Héctor Torres	Mexico	3:50.10	q
7	4	Kazuki Kajiyama	Japan	3:50.53	Q
8	5	Andrey Zadorozhniy	Russia	3:50.64	Q
8	4	Gilbert Mvuyekure	Burundi	3:50.77	Q
9	5	Kim Soon-hyung	South Korea	3:51.28	Q
10	4	Bruno Witchalls	Great Britain	3:51.41	Q
11	4	Andrea Giocondi	Italy	3:51.78	Q
12	4	Bernhard Richter	Austria	3:51.92	q
13	5	Nigel Adkin	Australia	3:52.76	Q
14	5	Andrea Abelli	Italy	3:52.80	Q
15	3	Thomas Ebner	Austria	3:53.09	Q
16	3	Abdelkader Chékhémani	France	3:53.31	Q
17	3	Shane Bilodeau	Canada	3:53.49	Q
17	5	Mehmet Çakir	Turkey	3:53.49	q
19	3	Michael Cox	United States	3:53.53	Q
20	4	Sammy Nyamongo	Kenya	3:53.58	
21	3	Malekshir Moradi Fard	Iran	3:53.61	
22	3	Peter Philipp	Switzerland	3:53.71	
23	5	Arumugam Palaniappan	Malaysia	3:54.56	
24	2	Abdelhamid Slimani	Algeria	3:55.55	Q
25	2	Takeshi Yamamoto	Japan	3:55.75	Q
26	2	Balázs Tölgyesi	Hungary	3:55.98	Q
27	2	Jason Pyrah	United States	3:56.24	Q
28	2	Arturo Espejel	Mexico	3:56.36	
29	1	Lesedinyana Lekgoa	Botswana	3:56.50	
30	3	Suliman Abdalla	Sudan	3:57.24	
31	4	Saravana Arjunan	Singapore	3:58.20	
32	2	Munusamy Arumugam	Malaysia	3:59.38	
32	1	U Aye Lwin	Myanmar	3:59.71	
33	2	Ling Seow Kang	Singapore	4:00.27	
34	3	Alexander Grech	Malta	4:02.69	
35	4	Giovanni Morejón	Bolivia	4:03.70	
36	5	Sylvester Simelane	Swaziland	4:06.49	
37	3	Naseer Ismail	Maldives	4:07.83	
38	1	Wong Kin On	Hong Kong	4:13.44	
39	1	Lay Sokky	Cambodia	4:36.75	
40	4	Gordon Kapak	Papua New Guinea	4:48.18	
	2	Javier Soto	Puerto Rico	DNS	
	2	Einārs Tupurītis	Latvia	DNS	
	4	Panagiotis Papoulias	Greece	DNS	
	5	Nicodemus Nyamajeje	Tanzania	DNS	
	5	Manuel Balmaceda	Chile	DNS	

=== Semifinals ===
Qualification: First 5 of each semifinal (Q) and the next 2 fastest (q) qualified for the final.

Rank	Heat	Athlete	Nationality	Time	Notes
1	1	Balázs Tölgyesi	Hungary	3:46.97	Q
2	1	Brian Treacy	Great Britain	3:47.08	Q
3	1	Abdelhamid Slimani	Algeria	3:47.16	Q
4	1	Andrey Zadorozhniy	Russia	3:47.31	Q
5	1	Andrea Abelli	Italy	3:47.31	Q
6	1	Piotr Rostkowski	Poland	3:48.01	q
7	1	Shane Bilodeau	Canada	3:48.20	q
8	1	Kazuki Kajiyama	Japan	3:48.45	
9	1	Bernhard Richter	Austria	3:50.16	
10	2	Abdelkader Chékhémani	France	3:50.96	Q
11	2	Bruno Witchalls	Great Britain	3:51.10	Q
12	2	Takeshi Yamamoto	Japan	3:51.11	Q
13	2	Allan Klassen	Canada	3:51.15	Q
14	2	Andrea Giocondi	Italy	3:51.17	Q
15	2	Thomas Ebner	Austria	3:51.24	
16	2	Kim Soon-hyung	South Korea	3:52.10	
17	1	Gilbert Mvuyekure	Burundi	3:52.16	
18	2	Abderrahim Maarouf	Morocco	3:53.01	
19	2	Cristian Orza	Romania	3:55.75	
20	2	Nigel Adkin	Australia	3:55.86	
21	2	Jason Pyrah	United States	3:57.31	
22	1	Héctor Torres	Mexico	3:57.55	
23	1	Michael Cox	United States	4:00.61	
24	2	Mehmet Çakir	Turkey	4:02.32	

=== Final ===
Rank	Athlete	Nationality	Time	Notes
1st place, gold medalist(s)	Abdelkader Chékhémani	France	3:46.53	
2nd place, silver medalist(s)	Andrea Giocondi	Italy	3:47.11	
3rd place, bronze medalist(s)	Abdelhamid Slimani	Algeria	3:47.43	
4	Bruno Witchalls	Great Britain	3:47.79	
5	Piotr Rostkowski	Poland	3:47.93	
6	Shane Bilodeau	Canada	3:48.40	
7	Balázs Tölgyesi	Hungary	3:48.41	
8	Andrey Zadorozhniy	Russia	3:48.60	
9	Brian Treacy	Great Britain	3:48.88	
10	Takeshi Yamamoto	Japan	3:49.13	
11	Andrea Abelli	Italy	3:51.77	
12	Allan Klassen	Canada	3:51.99	
