= Hiroshi Sasano =

Japanese middle-distance runner

Personal information
- Nationality: Japanese
- Born: 23 September 1978 (age 47) Aichi Prefecture, Japan
- Education: Ritsumeikan University
- Height: 1.80 m (5 ft 11 in)
- Weight: 63 kg (139 lb)

Sport
- Country: Japan
- Sport: Track and field
- Event: 800 metres

Achievements and titles
- Personal best: 800 m: 1:47.02 (Heusden-Zolder 2004)
Medal record
Men's athletics
Representing Japan
East Asian Games
Bronze medal – third place	2001 Osaka	800 m

Hiroshi Sasano (笹野 浩志, Sasano Hiroshi; born 23 September 1978 in Aichi Prefecture) is a Japanese middle-distance runner. He was a three-time Japanese national champion in the 800 metres.

== Personal best ==
Event	Time	Competition	Venue	Date
800 m	1:47.02	KBC Night of Athletics	Heusden-Zolder, Belgium	31 July 2004

== International competition ==
Year	Competition	Venue	Position	Event	Time
Representing Japan
2001	East Asian Games	Osaka, Japan	3rd	800 m	1:49.39
2002	Asian Games	Busan, South Korea	11th (h)	800 m	1:49.51
2003	Asian Championships	Manila, Philippines	7th	800 m	1:56.32

== National titles ==
- Japanese Championships
  - 800 m: 2000, 2002, 2003
