= Bouabdellah Tahri =

French athlete

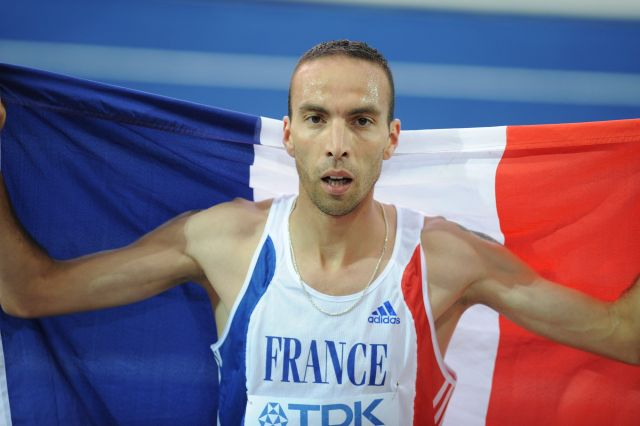
- Tahri in 2009

Personal information
- Nickname: Bob
- Born: 20 December 1978 (age 47) Metz, France
- Height: 1.91 m (6 ft 3 in)
- Weight: 65 kg (143 lb)

Sport
- Country: France
- Sport: Athletics (middle-distance and long-distance running)
- Event(s): 2000 m steeplechase, 3000 m steeplechase, 1500 m, mile, 3000 m, 5000 m, 10000 m, cross-country running
- Club: Athlétisme Metz Métropole

Achievements and titles
- Personal best(s): 1500m outdoors: 3:32.73 (2013) 3000m outdoors: 7:33.18 (2009); 5000m outdoors: 13:12.22 (2014); 2000m steeplechase outdoors: 5:13.47 (2010) 3000m steeplechase outdoors: 8:01.18 (2009)
Medal record
Men's athletics
Representing France
World Championships
Bronze medal – third place	2009 Berlin	3000 m steeplechase
European Championships
Silver medal – second place	2010 Barcelona	3000 m steeplechase
Bronze medal – third place	2006 Gothenburg	3000 m steeplechase
European Indoor Championships
Silver medal – second place	2007 Birmingham	3000 m
Silver medal – second place	2009 Turin	3000 m
Continental Cup
Bronze medal – third place	2010 Split	5000 m

Bouabdellah Tahri (born 20 December 1978), also known as Bob Tahri, is a retired middle-distance and long-distance French runner, who was born in Metz. He competed mainly in the 3000 m steeplechase distance. He also competes in the 2000 m steeplechase, 1500 m, mile, 3000 m, 5000 m, 10000 m and cross-country running. He has won several medals at major international championships such as the World Championships, European Championships and the European Indoor Championships. Moreover, he has won medals in the European Cup, European Team Championships, IAAF World Cup, IAAF Continental Cup and the IAAF World Athletics Final.

In June 2009, Tahri improved his 2000 m outdoor steeplechase European record with a run of 5:15.36 in Nancy, France. He set a new 3000 m outdoor steeplechase European record of 8:01.18 in finishing third in the final of the 2009 World Championships in Berlin. On 25 June 2010, Tahri set a new world-record time of 5:13.47 in the 2000m outdoor steeplechase race in Tomblaine, France. The previous world-record time of 5:14.43 was set on 21 August 1990 by Julius Kariuki. But Tahri's 2000m outdoor steeplechase world record was broken only 5 days later by his compatriot Mahiedine Mekhissi-Benabbad. On 29 June 2010, Tahri won the 3000m outdoor steeplechase race in Metz in the world's fastest time (8:03.72) of the year. He retired after running 3000 meters at the 2016 IAAF Diamond League meeting in Paris.

== Notable results ==
3000 m steeplechase, unless otherwise stated; only the position in the final is indicated:

- 2013 European Team Championships - gold medal (3000 m)
- 2013 European Team Championships - silver medal (5000 m)
- 2011 World Championships - fourth place
- 2010 Continental Cup - bronze medal (5000 m)
- 2010 European Championships - silver medal
- 2009 World Athletics Final - bronze medal
- 2009 World Championships - bronze medal
- 2009 European Indoor Championships - silver medal (3000 m)
- 2008 World Athletics Final - seventh place
- 2008 Olympic Games - fifth place
- 2007 World Athletics Final - fourth place
- 2007 World Championships - fifth place
- 2007 European Indoor Championships - silver medal (3000 m)
- 2007 European Cup - gold medal (3000 m)
- 2006 IAAF World Cup - bronze medal
- 2006 World Athletics Final - bronze medal
- 2006 European Championships - bronze medal
- 2005 European Cup - silver medal (5000 m)
- 2005 World Athletics Final - fifth place
- 2005 World Championships - eighth place
- 2004 European Cup - gold medal
- 2004 Olympic Games - seventh place
- 2003 World Athletics Final - fifth place (3000 m)
- 2003 World Championships - fourth place
- 2002 European Cup - gold medal
- 2002 European Championships - fourth place
- 2001 European Cup - gold medal
- 2001 World Championships - fifth place
- 2001 World Indoor Championships - eleventh place (3000 m)
- 2000 European Cup - gold medal
- 1999 World Championships - twelfth place
- 1998 European Championships - tenth place
- 1996 World Junior Championships - seventh place

Records
Preceded by (Netherlands) Simon Vroemen	Men's 3000 m Steeplechase European Record Holder; 2009-07-03 to 2013-07-05	Succeeded by Mahiedine Mekhissi-Benabbad
