= Erik Nedeau =

American middle-distance runner

Medal record

Men's Athletics

Representing the United States

World Indoor Championships
Bronze medal – third place	1995 Barcelona	1500 m

Erik Nedeau (born August 30, 1971), is a former international class middle-distance runner.

== Early life and education ==
Nedeau grew up in Kennebunk, Maine and graduated from Northeastern University in Boston, Massachusetts in 1994. Nedeau competed for the Northeastern Huskies track and field team in the NCAA.

== Achievements ==
At the 5th IAAF World Indoor Championships in Athletics, held in Barcelona, Spain in March 1995, Erik Nedeau won the bronze medal in the 1500 meters with a time of 3:44.91. He finished third less than half a second behind 1500 world record holder Hicham El Guerrouj of Morocco (3:44.54) and Mateo Cañellas of Spain (3:44.85)

US Rankings according to Track and Field News

800 meters: 1992 7th, 1994 10th, 1995 8th.

1500 meters: 1994 7th, 1995 5th, 1996 6th.

=== Personal bests ===
800 meters: 1:46.19, 1000 meters: 2:19.18, 1500 meters: 3:38.24, One Mile: 3:57

== Current activity ==
Erik Nedeau was the Amherst College head coach of men's cross country and track from 1995 to 2017. Nedeau coached the college team to its first NCAA regional championship title in 2007.
