= Kim Soon-hyung =

South Korean middle-distance runner

Personal information
- Born: 15 July 1973 (age 53) Daegu, South Korea

Sport
- Sport: Track and field
Medal record
Representing South Korea
Asian Games
Gold medal – first place	1994 Hiroshima	4x400 m relay
Silver medal – second place	1998 Bangkok	800 m
Silver medal – second place	1998 Bangkok	1500 m
Asian Championships
Gold medal – first place	1993 Manila	1500 m
Silver medal – second place	2000 Jakarta	800 m
Bronze medal – third place	1995 Jakarta	1500 m

Kim Soon-Hyung (born 15 July 1973) is a retired South Korean middle distance runner who specialized in the 800 and 1500 metres. He represented South Korea in the 800 m at the 2000 Summer Olympics.

He was the 1993 Asian Champion over 1500 m and is a two-time East Asian Games champion, having won in 1993 and 1997. He won two silver medals at the 1998 Asian Games.

== Achievements ==
Year	Competition	Venue	Position	Event	Notes
Representing South Korea
1990	World Junior Championships	Plovdiv, Bulgaria	28th (h)	1500m	3:54.15
1992	World Junior Championships	Seoul, South Korea	20th (h)	800m	1:52.19
1992	World Junior Championships	Seoul, South Korea	4th	1500m	3:40.26
1992	Asian Junior Championships	New Delhi, India	3rd	800 m	1:51.32
1992	Asian Junior Championships	New Delhi, India	3rd	1500 m	3:52.75
1993	East Asian Games	Shanghai, China	1st	1500 m	3:56.17
1993	Universiade	Buffalo, United States	22nd (sf)	1500 m	3:56.74
1993	Asian Championships	Manila, Philippines	1st	1500 m	3:38.60 CR
1994	Asian Games	Hiroshima, Japan	1st	4 × 400 m relay	3:10.19
1995	World Indoor Championships	Barcelona, Spain	21st (h)	800 m	1:53.01
1995	Asian Championships	Jakarta, Indonesia	3rd	1500 m	3:45.08
1995	Universiade	Fukuoka, Japan	6th	800 m	1:48.90
1995	Universiade	Fukuoka, Japan	17th (sf)	1500 m	3:52.10
1997	East Asian Games	Busan, South Korea	1st	800 m	1:49.00
1997	East Asian Games	Busan, South Korea	3rd	1500 m	3:51.18
1997	Universiade	Catania, Italy	22nd (h)	800 m	1:51.07
1997	Universiade	Catania, Italy	43rd (h)	1500 m	4:00.12
1998	Asian Games	Bangkok, Thailand	2nd	800 m	1:46.61
1998	Asian Games	Bangkok, Thailand	2nd	1500 m	3:40.56
1999	Universiade	Palma de Mallorca, Spain	9th (sf)	800 m	1:48.28
1999	World Championships	Seville, Spain	15th (sf)	800 m	1:47.15
2000	Asian Championships	Jakarta, Indonesia	2nd	800 m	1:50.06
2000	Olympic Games	Sydney, Australia	40th (h)	800 m	1:48.49
2002	Asian Games	Busan, South Korea	8th	800 m	1:48.60
2002	Asian Games	Busan, South Korea	14th	1500 m	3:51.47

=== Personal bests ===
- 800 metres - 1:46.03 min (1994)
- 1500 metres - 3:38.60 min (1993)
