= Fikre Wondafrash =

Ethiopian retired middle-distance runner

Personal information
- Nationality: Ethiopian; Yugoslav (up to 1992)
- Born: February 27, 1973 (age 53) Unknown, Ethiopia

Sport
- Sport: Track
- Event: 1500 meters
- College team: BYU
- Club: Crvena Zvezda
- Coached by: Willard Hirschi

Achievements and titles
- Personal best: 1500m: 3:44.29

Fikre Wondafrash (born February 27, 1973) is an Ethiopian retired middle-distance runner who specialized in the 1500 meters. He competed for Ethiopia at the 1992 World Junior Championships in Athletics.

== Running career ==
=== Youth ===
Although born in Ethiopia, Wondafrash spent a part of his upbringing in Belgrade since his mother worked as an embassy cook there. At one point he had citizenship in Yugoslavia, as he set the country's national boys' junior record for the indoor 1500 meters on February 11, 1992, running 3:48.57 in Budapest for Belgrade club AK Crvena Zvezda. On July 15, 1992, he ran a personal best time of 3:44.29 in the 1500 meters. Later that summer, he represented Ethiopia at the 1992 World Junior Championships in Athletics, placing second to last in heat 2 of the men's 1500 meters.

=== Collegiate ===
He was subsequently contacted by Brigham Young University track coach Willard Hirschi, who recruited him to BYU when Yugoslavia was breaking up. On March 30, 1996, he placed second in the men's 800 meters at the Cal Poly meet in San Luis Obispo with a time of 1:52.78. On March 22, 1997, he finished in 13th place in the men's 5000 meters at the Stanford Invitational in a time of 14:32.74. In February 1998, he provisionally qualified for the preliminary rounds of the 1998 NCAA DI Indoor Championships when he ran 4:10.16 for the mile at the Mountain State Games in Pocatello, Idaho. On May 23, 1998, he placed seventh in the men's 1500 meters at the WAC Championships in 3:49.53.
