= 1997 European Athletics U23 Championships – Men's 1500 metres =

The men's 1500 metres event at the 1997 European Athletics U23 Championships was held in Turku, Finland, on 10 and 12 July 1997.

== Medalists ==
Gold	Reyes Estévez; Spain
Silver	Carlos García; Spain
Bronze	Alexandru Vasile; Romania

== Results ==
=== Final ===
12 July

Rank	Name	Nationality	Time	Notes
1st place, gold medalist(s)	Reyes Estévez	Spain	3:42.37	
2nd place, silver medalist(s)	Carlos García	Spain	3:43.24	
3rd place, bronze medalist(s)	Alexandru Vasile	Romania	3:43.36	
4	Dirk Heinze	Germany	3:44.81	
5	Juha Kukkamo	Finland	3:45.16	
6	David Salvati	France	3:45.25	
7	Andrew Walker	Ireland	3:45.85	
8	Sami Valtonen	Finland	3:45.97	
9	Mauro Casagrande	Italy	3:46.09	
10	Miroslav Suchý	Czech Republic	3:47.01	
11	Frédéric Chocteau	France	3:47.18	
12	Thomas Suter	Switzerland	3:47.28	

=== Heats ===
10 July
Qualified: first 4 in each heat and 4 best to the Final

==== Heat 1 ====
Rank	Name	Nationality	Time	Notes
1	Carlos García	Spain	3:44.56	Q
2	David Salvati	France	3:44.88	Q
3	Mauro Casagrande	Italy	3:45.23	Q
4	Juha Kukkamo	Finland	3:45.65	Q
5	Dirk Heinze	Germany	3:45.66	q
6	Sebastian Miller	Poland	3:46.33	
7	Daniel Oniciuc	Romania	3:49.27	
8	Evaldas Martinka	Lithuania	3:52.22	
9	Danko Radomirović	Yugoslavia	3:55.36	
10	Abdülkadir Türk	Turkey	3:58.01	

==== Heat 2 ====
Rank	Name	Nationality	Time	Notes
1	Reyes Estévez	Spain	3:43.14	Q
2	Alexandru Vasile	Romania	3:43.55	Q
3	Miroslav Suchý	Czech Republic	3:44.88	Q
4	Andrew Walker	Ireland	3:44.89	Q
5	Frédéric Chocteau	France	3:45.22	q
6	Thomas Suter	Switzerland	3:45.29	q
7	Sami Valtonen	Finland	3:46.22	q
8	Ben Reese	Great Britain	3:46.75	
9	Jakub Fijałkowski	Poland	3:47.24	

== Participation ==
According to an unofficial count, 19 athletes from 14 countries participated in the event.

- Czech Republic (1)
- Finland (2)
- France (2)
- Germany (1)
- Great Britain (1)
- Ireland (1)
- Italy (1)
- Lithuania (1)
- Poland (2)
- Romania (2)
- Spain (2)
- Switzerland (1)
- Turkey (1)
- Yugoslavia (1)
