= Anthony Whiteman =

British middle-distance runner

Tony Whiteman
Personal information
- Born: 13 November 1971 (age 54) Carshalton, England
- Height: 189 cm (6 ft 2 in)
- Weight: 72 kg (159 lb)

Sport
- Sport: Athletics
- Event: middle-distance
- Club: Shaftesbury Barnet Harriers

Achievements and titles
- Personal bests: 800m 1:45.81 (Crystal Palace 2000); 1500 m 3:32.34 (Monaco 1997)
Medal record
Men's athletics
Representing England
Commonwealth Games
Bronze medal – third place	1998 Kuala Lumpur	1500m
Representing Great Britain
European Indoor Championships
Silver medal – second place	1996 Stockholm	1500 m
Summer Universiade
Gold medal – first place	1997 Catania	1500 m
World Masters Athletics Championships (M40)
Gold medal – first place	2014 Budapest	800 m
Gold medal – first place	2014 Budapest	1500 m
Gold medal – first place	2014 Budapest	3000 m
Gold medal – first place	2015 Lyon	800 m
Gold medal – first place	2015 Lyon	1500 m

Anthony William Whiteman (born 13 November 1971) is a male British former middle distance runner who competed in the 1996 Summer Olympics and in the 2000 Summer Olympics.

== Biography ==
Whiteman, born in Carshalton, was a member of the Shaftesbury Barnet Harriers. Following the 1996 Summer Olympics he won the 1997 World University Games 1500 metres.

He represented England and won a bronze medal in the 1,500 metres event, at the 1998 Commonwealth Games in Kuala Lumpur, Malaysia.

A second appearance at the Olympic Games ensued when he ran in the heats of the 1500 and two years later he competed in the 1500 metres once again, at the 2002 Commonwealth Games.

Whiteman became the British 1500 metres champion after winning the British AAA Championships title at the 2002 AAA Championships.

Now a master (over 40), he currently has the world record in that age group for 800 metres and pending records for the mile and 1500 metres. He has run 3:32.24 for 1500m and has a best mile time of 3:51.90.

== Competition record ==
Year	Competition	Venue	Position	Event	Notes
Representing Great Britain and England
1995	World Indoor Championships	Barcelona, Spain	11th	1500 m	3:47.50
1996	European Indoor Championships	Stockholm, Sweden	2nd	1500 m	3:44.78
1996	Olympic Games	Atlanta, United States	17th (sf)	1500 m	3:36.11
1997	Universiade	Catania, Italy	1st	1500 m	3:43.57
1998	European Championships	Budapest, Hungary	4th	1500 m	3:42.27
1998	Commonwealth Games	Kuala Lumpur, Malaysia	3rd	1500 m	3:40.70
2000	Olympic Games	Sydney, Australia	–	1500 m	DNF
2001	World Championships	Edmonton, Canada	7th (sf)	1500 m	3:36.77
2002	Commonwealth Games	Manchester, United Kingdom	4th	1500 m	3:38.04
2002	European Championships	Munich, Germany	26th (h)	800 m	1:50.60
2002	European Championships	Munich, Germany	9th	1500 m	3:47.10
