= Kiyonori =

- Gender: Male

Origin
- Origin: Japanese
- Meaning: Different meanings depending on the kanji used

Kiyonori (written: 清訓 or 清憲) is a masculine Japanese given name. Notable people with the name include:

- Kiyonori Kikutake (菊竹 清訓) (1928–2011), Japanese architect
- Kiyonori Saito (born 1947), Japanese television actor known under his stage name Daisuke Ban

== See also ==
- Kiyonari, a similar Japanese masculine given name
