= Abdelkader Chékhémani =

French middle-distance runner

Kader Chékhémani
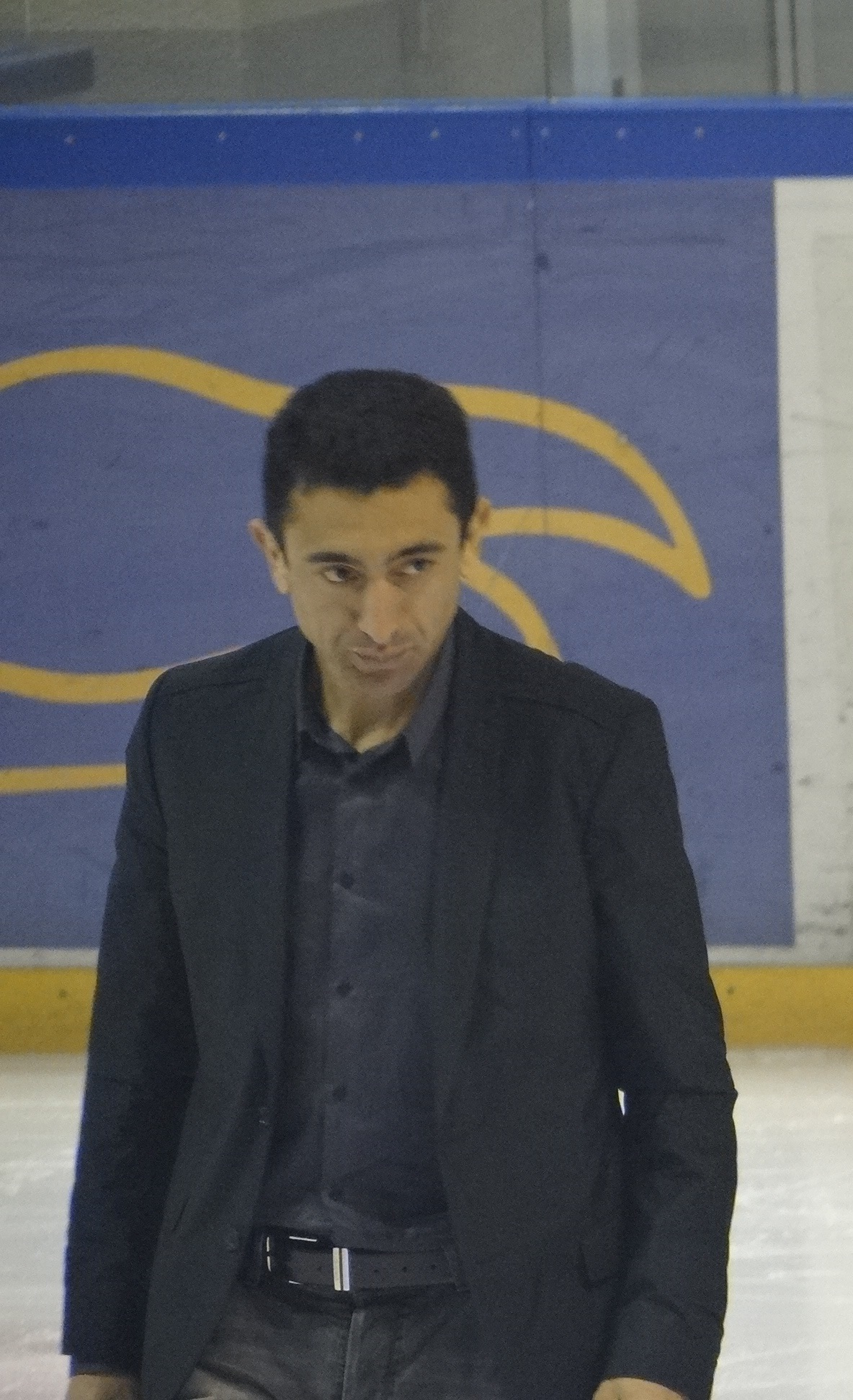
- Chékhémani at a hockey game in 2013

Personal information
- Full name: Abdelkader Chékhémani
- Born: 18 July 1971 (age 55) Barentin, France
- Height: 177 cm (5 ft 10 in)
- Weight: 70 kg (154 lb)

Sport
- Country: France
- Sport: Athletics
- Event: Middle-distance running
- Club: Stade Sottevillais 76
Medal record
Men's athletics
Representing France
European Indoor Championships
Silver medal – second place	1998 Valencia	1500 m
Bronze medal – third place	1994 Paris	1500 m
Bronze medal – third place	1996 Stockholm	1500 m
Summer Universiade
Gold medal – first place	1993 Buffalo	1500 m
Gold medal – first place	1995 Fukuoka	1500 m

Abdelkader Chékhémani (born 18 July 1971), also known as Abdel Kader Chékhémani and commonly known as Kader Chékhémani, is a French former middle-distance runner who competed in the 1996 Summer Olympics.

== Competition record ==
Year	Competition	Venue	Position	Event	Notes
Representing France
1993	Universiade	Buffalo, United States	1st	1500 m	3:46.32
1994	European Indoor Championships	Paris, France	3rd	1500 m	3:44.65
1994	Jeux de la Francophonie	Paris, France	2nd	1500 m	3:43.08
1994	European Championships	Helsinki, Finland	8th	1500 m	3:38.42
1995	World Championships	Gothenburg, Sweden	6th	1500 m	3:36.90
1995	Universiade	Fukuoka, Japan	1st	1500 m	3:46.53
1996	European Indoor Championships	Stockholm, Sweden	3rd	1500 m	3:45.96
1996	Olympic Games	Atlanta, United States	8th (sf)	1500 m	3:34.84
1997	World Indoor Championships	Paris, France	12th	1500 m	3:49.47
1998	European Indoor Championships	Valencia, Spain	2nd	1500 m	3:44.89
1998	European Championships	Budapest, Hungary	8th	1500 m	3:42.92
1999	World Championships	Seville, Spain	9th (sf)	1500 m	3:37.77
