= 2000 Asian Athletics Championships – Men's 800 metres =

The men's 800 metres event at the 2000 Asian Athletics Championships was held in Jakarta, Indonesia on 29–31 August.

== Medalists ==
Gold	Silver	Bronze
Mehdi Jelodarzadeh; Iran	Kim Soon-Hyung; South Korea	Lee Jae-Hoon; South Korea

== Results ==
=== Heats ===
Rank	Heat	Name	Nationality	Time	Notes
1	3	Mehdi Jelodarzadeh	Iran	1:51.03	Q
1	2	Kim Soon-Hyung	South Korea	1:51.03	Q
3	4	Lee Jae-Hoon	South Korea	1:51.09	Q
4	3	K. M. Binu	India	1:51.30	Q
5	4	Redouane Jadouh	Syria	1:52.01	Q
6	3	John Lozada	Philippines	1:52.37	q
7	4	Salem Amer Al-Badri	Qatar	1:52.48	q
8	4	Mohammad-Reza Molaei	Iran	1:52.71	
9	3	Ibrahim Akrin	Indonesia	1:53.28	
10	1	Salah Taib Fadlallah	Saudi Arabia	1:53.34	Q
11	1	Abdulrahman Suleiman	Qatar	1:53.36	Q
12	2	Dicky Gunawan	Indonesia	1:53.63	Q
13	1	Akinori Mori	Japan	1:54.07	
14	2	Ali Sulaiman Hamdan	United Arab Emirates	1:54.71	
15	4	Maksim Lapyrenok	Kazakhstan	1:54.94	
15	3	Chidambaran Veeramani	Singapore	1:55.00	
16	3	Nazar Begliyev	Turkmenistan	1:55.84	
17	1	Naseer Ismail	Maldives	1:56.09	
18	1	Salem Saeed Omar	United Arab Emirates	1:56.24	
19	4	Mohammad Al-Azemi	Kuwait	1:56.69	
20	2	Mohamed Naji Haidara	Bahrain	1:57.05	
21	1	Bazragch Batmunkh	Mongolia	1:57.19	
22	4	Leung Tat Wei	Hong Kong	1:57.62	
23	1	Chamkaur Singh	Singapore	2:01.82	
24	2	Gao Shuai	China	2:02.45	

=== Final ===
Rank	Name	Nationality	Time	Notes
1st place, gold medalist(s)	Mehdi Jelodarzadeh	Iran	1:49.80	
2nd place, silver medalist(s)	Kim Soon-Hyung	South Korea	1:50.06	
3rd place, bronze medalist(s)	Lee Jae-Hoon	South Korea	1:50.35	
4	John Lozada	Philippines	1:50.73	
5	Abdulrahman Suleiman	Qatar	1:50.77	
6	Salem Amer Al-Badri	Qatar	1:52.43	
7	Dicky Gunawan	Indonesia	1:53.56	
8	Salah Taib Fadlallah	Saudi Arabia	1:53.61	
9	K. M. Binu	India	1:55.00	
	Redouane Jadouh	Syria	DNS	
