= Lukáš Vydra =

Czech runner

Medal record

Men's athletics

Representing Czech Republic

European Championships
Bronze medal – third place	1998 Budapest	800 m

Lukáš Vydra (born 23 August 1973) is a former Czech middle-distance runner.

He finished fourth in 1500 metres at the 1996 European Indoor Championships and won the bronze medal in 800 metres at the 1998 European Championships

His personal best 800 m time is 1:44.84 minutes, achieved in August 1998 in Zürich.

== Competition record ==
Year	Competition	Venue	Position	Event	Notes
Representing Czech Republic
1996	European Indoor Championships	Stockholm, Sweden	4th	1500 m	3:46.20
1997	World Championships	Athens, Greece	26th (qf)	800 m	1:47.56
1998	European Indoor Championships	Valencia, Spain	10th (sf)	800 m	1:50.23
1998	European Championships	Budapest, Hungary	3rd	800 m	1:45.23
1999	World Indoor Championships	Maebashi, Japan	14th (sf)	800 m	1:49.18
2001	World Indoor Championships	Lisbon, Portugal	18th (h)	800 m	1:50.99
