= 2009 European Athletics Indoor Championships – Men's 3000 metres =

The Men's 3000 metres event at the 2009 European Athletics Indoor Championships was held on March 6–7.

== Medalists ==
| Gold | Silver | Bronze |
|---|---|---|
| Mo Farah; Great Britain | Bouabdellah Tahri; France | Jesús España; Spain |

== Results ==
=== Heats ===
First 4 of each heat (Q) and the next 4 fastest (q) qualified for the final.

| Rank | Heat | Name | Nationality | Time | Notes |
|---|---|---|---|---|---|
| 1 | 1 | Bouabdellah Tahri | France | 7:52.58 | Q |
| 2 | 1 | Sergio Sánchez | Spain | 7:52.75 | Q |
| 3 | 1 | Selim Bayrak | Turkey | 7:52.93 | Q |
| 4 | 1 | Nick McCormick | Great Britain | 7:53.35 | Q |
| 5 | 1 | Mark Draper | Great Britain | 7:53.91 | q, PB |
| 6 | 1 | Gezachw Yossef | Israel | 7:59.44 | q, PB |
| 7 | 1 | Albert Minczér | Hungary | 8:00.94 | q |
| 8 | 2 | Olle Walleräng | Sweden | 8:02.09 | Q |
| 9 | 2 | Jesús España | Spain | 8:02.99 | Q |
| 10 | 2 | Mo Farah | Great Britain | 8:03.26 | Q |
| 11 | 2 | Francisco España | Spain | 8:03.96 | Q |
| 12 | 2 | Martin Pröll | Austria | 8:04.84 | q |
| 13 | 1 | Oskar Käck | Sweden | 8:05.42 | |
| 14 | 1 | Noureddine Smaïl | France | 8:07.17 | |
| 15 | 1 | Martin Steinbauer | Austria | 8:08.03 | |
| 16 | 2 | Tiidrek Nurme | Estonia | 8:08.81 | |
| 17 | 2 | Willem Van Hoof | Belgium | 8:10.07 | |
| 18 | 2 | Aleksandr Orlov | Russia | 8:12.12 | |
| 19 | 2 | Johan Wallerstein | Sweden | 8:12.65 | |
| 20 | 2 | Ali Topkara | Turkey | 8:23.57 | |
| | 1 | Yuri Floriani | Italy | DNF | |
| | 1 | Serhiy Lebid | Ukraine | DNF | |
| | 2 | Mohamed-Khaled Belabbas | France | DNF | |

=== Final ===
| Rank | Name | Nationality | Time | Notes |
|---|---|---|---|---|
| 1st place, gold medalist(s) | Mo Farah | Great Britain | 7:40.17 | |
| 2nd place, silver medalist(s) | Bouabdellah Tahri | France | 7:42.14 | |
| 3rd place, bronze medalist(s) | Jesús España | Spain | 7:43.29 | SB |
| 4 | Sergio Sánchez | Spain | 7:45.29 | |
| 5 | Selim Bayrak | Turkey | 7:45.46 | NR |
| 6 | Nick McCormick | Great Britain | 7:52.07 | |
| 7 | Olle Walleräng | Sweden | 7:56.44 | |
| 8 | Gezachw Yossef | Israel | 8:01.78 | |
| 9 | Francisco España | Spain | 8:03.45 | |
| 10 | Martin Pröll | Austria | 8:04.03 | |
| 11 | Mark Draper | Great Britain | 8:10.19 | |
| 12 | Albert Minczér | Hungary | 8:10.55 | |
