= 1996 European Athletics Indoor Championships – Men's 1500 metres =

The men's 1500 metres event at the 1996 European Athletics Indoor Championships was held in Stockholm Globe Arena on 9–10 March.

== Medalists ==
Gold	Silver	Bronze
Mateo Cañellas; Spain	Anthony Whiteman; Great Britain	Kader Chékhémani; France

== Results ==
=== Heats ===
First 3 from each heat (Q) and the next 3 fastest (q) qualified for the final.

Rank	Heat	Name	Nationality	Time	Notes
1	1	Anthony Whiteman	Great Britain	3:41.25	Q
2	1	Mateo Cañellas	Spain	3:41.28	Q
3	1	Lukáš Vydra	Czech Republic	3:41.51	Q
4	1	Branko Zorko	Croatia	3:41.71	q
5	1	Peter Philipp	Switzerland	3:41.77	q
6	1	Andrey Zadorozhniy	Russia	3:43.31	q
7	1	Patrick Johansson	Sweden	3:45.85	
8	2	Kader Chékhémani	France	3:46.68	Q
9	2	Thomas Ebner	Austria	3:47.42	Q
10	2	Terry West	Great Britain	3:48.10	Q
11	2	Radosław Świć	Poland	3:48.40	
12	2	Philippe Bandi	Switzerland	3:49.48	
13	2	Robin van Helden	Netherlands	3:53.01	
	2	Javier Rodríguez	Spain	DQ	
	2	Jörgen Zaki	Sweden	DNF	

=== Final ===
Rank	Name	Nationality	Time	Notes
1st place, gold medalist(s)	Mateo Cañellas	Spain	3:44.50	
2nd place, silver medalist(s)	Anthony Whiteman	Great Britain	3:44.78	
3rd place, bronze medalist(s)	Kader Chékhémani	France	3:45.96	
4	Lukáš Vydra	Czech Republic	3:46.20	
5	Branko Zorko	Croatia	3:46.82	
6	Peter Philipp	Switzerland	3:47.55	
7	Thomas Ebner	Austria	3:47.60	
8	Andrey Zadorozhniy	Russia	3:47.87	
9	Terry West	Great Britain	3:49.83	
