= Youcef Abdi =

Australian athlete (born 1977)

Youcef Abdi (Kabyle: Yusef Ɛabdi) (born 7 December 1977) is an Australian athlete who specialized in the 3000 m steeplechase. He changed his allegiance from Algeria in 2000. Since his retirement from athletics he has found a new calling and currently plays soccer in the over 35's division for Waverly Old Boys alongside Socceroos ex-captain Craig Foster and ex-AFL player Adam Goodes.

== Early life ==
Youcef Abdi was born in Azazga, Algeria, and moved to Australia as a teenager. He obtained Australian citizenship in 2000.

== Competition record ==
Year	Competition	Venue	Position	Event	Notes
Representing Algeria
1996	World Junior Championships	Sydney, Australia	34th (h)	800 m	1:54.12
Representing Australia
2000	Oceania Championships	Adelaide, Australia	2nd	1500 m	3:45.45
2002	Commonwealth Games	Manchester, United Kingdom	3rd	1500 m	3:37.77
2003	World Championships	Paris, France	10th (sf)	1500 m	3:40.13
2006	Commonwealth Games	Melbourne, Australia	11th	3000 m s'chase	9:02.22
2007	World Championships	Osaka, Japan	36th (h)	3000 m s'chase	9:51.33
2008	Olympic Games	Beijing, China	6th	3000 m s'chase	8:16.36
2009	World Championships	Berlin, Germany	34th (h)	3000 m s'chase	8:49.88
2010	Commonwealth Games	Delhi, India	6th	3000 m s'chase	8:33.20
2011	World Championships	Daegu, South Korea	28th (h)	3000 m s'chase	8:38.42
2012	Olympic Games	London, United Kingdom	23rd (h)	3000 m s'chase	8:29.81
