= Athletics at the 2005 Summer Universiade – Men's 1500 metres =

The men's 1500 metres event at the 2005 Summer Universiade was held on 16–18 August in İzmir, Turkey.

== Medalists ==
Gold	Silver	Bronze
Ivan Heshko; Ukraine	Andrew Baddeley; Great Britain	Vincent Rono; Kenya

== Results ==
=== Heats ===
Rank	Heat	Athlete	Nationality	Time	Notes
1	3	Vincent Rono	Kenya	3:43.25	Q
2	3	Chris Mulvaney	Great Britain	3:44.12	Q
3	3	Samir Khadar	Algeria	3:44.53	Q
4	3	Víctor Riobo	Spain	3:44.80	q
5	3	Johan Cronje	South Africa	3:44.85	q
6	3	Ryan Hayden	Canada	3:45.41	q
7	2	Andrew Baddeley	Great Britain	3:45.62	Q
8	3	Yasunori Murakami	Japan	3:46.27	
9	1	Ivan Heshko	Ukraine	3:46.59	Q
10	2	Emilio Martín	Spain	3:46.87	Q
11	2	Mikhail Kolganov	Kazakhstan	3:46.97	Q, SB
12	1	Sergey Ivanov	Russia	3:47.29	Q
13	2	Mark Christie	Ireland	3:47.30	
13	1	Jonas Hamm	Finland	3:47.47	Q
15	1	Hocine Boutria	Algeria	3:47.53	
16	2	Johan Pretorius	South Africa	3:47.75	
17	2	Darko Radomirović	Serbia and Montenegro	3:48.41	
18	1	Francis Kasagule	Uganda	3:49.09	
19	2	Bayron Piedra	Ecuador	3:50.03	
20	1	Mirko Petrović	Serbia and Montenegro	3:50.05	
21	2	Ryan McKenzie	Canada	3:50.74	
22	2	Mikkel Kleis	Denmark	3:51.21	
23	1	Brian Lindberg	Denmark	3:52.05	
24	3	Nikolai Vedehin	Estonia	3:52.57	
25	1	Juan Odalis Almonte	Dominican Republic	3:54.64	
26	2	Mlungisi Dlamini	Swaziland	3:58.24	
27	3	Lau Tak Lung	Hong Kong	3:59.74	
28	3	Hamza Rzgalla Gomaa	Sudan	4:03.46	
29	3	Prosper Agage	Ghana	4:08.55	
30	1	Amon Kankutula	Zambia	4:13.05	
31	1	Mohamed Traish	Libya	4:16.23	
32	2	Joakim Fayiah	Liberia	4:24.96	
	1	Brian Murray	Ireland	DNS	
	1	Yoshihiro Shimodaira	Japan	DNS	
	2	Abda Manam Ahamdtalin	Sudan	DNS	
	3	Ehsan Mohajer Shojaei	Iran	DNS	

=== Final ===
Rank	Athlete	Nationality	Time	Notes
1st place, gold medalist(s)	Ivan Heshko	Ukraine	3:49.49	
2nd place, silver medalist(s)	Andrew Baddeley	Great Britain	3:50.90	
3rd place, bronze medalist(s)	Vincent Rono	Kenya	3:51.48	
4	Johan Cronje	South Africa	3:52.16	
5	Jonas Hamm	Finland	3:52.40	
6	Emilio Martín	Spain	3:53.07	
7	Chris Mulvaney	Great Britain	3:53.53	
8	Víctor Riobo	Spain	3:53.82	
9	Samir Khadar	Algeria	3:53.89	
10	Mikhail Kolganov	Kazakhstan	3:53.97	
11	Ryan Hayden	Canada	3:54.34	
12	Sergey Ivanov	Russia	3:55.02	
