= Andrew Graffin =

British middle-distance runner

Andy Graffin
Personal information
- Nationality: British (English)
- Born: 20 December 1977 (age 48) Sutton, London, England
- Height: 181 cm (5 ft 11 in)
- Weight: 67 kg (148 lb)

Sport
- Sport: Athletics
- Event: Middle-distance running
- Club: Belgrave Harriers

Andrew Neill Graffin (born 20 December 1977) is a British middle-distance runner who competed at the 2000 Summer Olympics.

== Biography ==
At the 2000 Olympic Games in Sydney, Graffin represented Great Britain in the men's 1500 metres event.

Graffin became the British 3000 metres champion after winning the British AAA Championships title at the 1999 AAA Championships. He was also the British 5000 metres champion after securing victory at the 2003 AAA Championships.

His twin brother Allen Graffin of Tonbridge AC, was also a notable athlete and was the 1997 British champion over 3,000 metres.
