= Athletics at the 1993 Summer Universiade – Men's 1500 metres =

The men's 1500 metres event at the 1993 Summer Universiade was held at the UB Stadium in Buffalo, United States on 16, 17 and 18 July 1993.

== Medalists ==
Gold	Silver	Bronze
Abdelkader Chékhémani; France	Bill Burke; United States	Gary Lough; Great Britain

== Results ==
=== Heats ===
Rank	Heat	Athlete	Nationality	Time	Notes
1	1	Rich Kenah	United States	3:50.59	Q
2	1	Allan Klassen	Canada	3:50.70	Q
3	1	Desmond English	Ireland	3:50.74	Q
4	1	Mohamed Zerfaoui	Morocco	3:50.90	Q
5	1	Waldemar Glinka	Poland	3:51.94	Q
6	1	Phil Spratley	New Zealand	3:52.56	q
7	3	Dmitriy Drozdov	Russia	3:53.96	Q
8	4	Ahmed Ibrahim Warsama	Qatar	3:54.03	Q
9	3	Mark Carroll	Ireland	3:54.18	Q
10	4	Sergey Kostylev	Russia	3:54.41	Q
11	4	Andy Keith	Great Britain	3:54.86	Q
12	4	Abdelkader Chékhémani	France	3:55.07	Q
13	4	Pierre Morath	Switzerland	3:55.07	Q
14	4	Themba Makhanya	Swaziland	3:55.16	q
15	3	Alex Davey	Australia	3:55.48	Q
16	2	Bill Burke	United States	3:55.72	Q
17	3	Fabio Olivo	Italy	3:55.75	Q
18	2	Dejan Pajkić	Independent Participants	3:55.77	Q
19	2	Gary Lough	Great Britain	3:55.80	Q
20	2	Kim Soon-hyung	South Korea	3:55.90	Q
21	2	Mohamed Shawki Abdullah	Qatar	3:55.98	Q
22	2	Eyvind Solbu	Norway	3:56.44	q
23	2	Sandu Rebenciuc	United States	3:56.62	q
24	2	Riad Gatt	Algeria	3:56.72	
25	4	Luis Díaz	Venezuela	3:57.44	
26	1	Jean-Pierre Ndahimana	Rwanda	3:57.61	
27	2	Peter Philipp	Switzerland	3:57.80	
28	3	Javier Soto	Puerto Rico	3:57.94	Q
29	3	Charles Baryamujura	Uganda	4:01.73	
30	2	Abdelmajid Mehir	Morocco	4:02.68	
31	4	Xandru Grech	Malta	4:04.16	
32	2	Jonny Gallo	Costa Rica	4:04.36	
33	1	Vilho Namufinda	Namibia	4:06.14	
34	1	Thompson Harokave	Papua New Guinea	4:18.74	
35	3	Jonathan Jonah	Sierra Leone	4:27.19	
	3	Jihad Al-Balaoui	Jordan	DNF	

=== Semifinals ===
Rank	Heat	Athlete	Nationality	Time	Notes
1	2	Rich Kenah	United States	3:45.15	Q
2	2	Allan Klassen	Canada	3:45.36	Q
3	2	Abdelkader Chékhémani	France	3:45.40	Q
4	2	Mark Carroll	Ireland	3:45.66	Q
5	2	Andy Keith	Great Britain	3:45.71	Q
6	2	Mohamed Shawki Abdullah	Qatar	3:46.10	q
7	2	Waldemar Glinka	Poland	3:46.72	q
8	2	Mohamed Zerfaoui	Morocco	3:47.34	
9	2	Sandu Rebenciuc	United States	3:48.19	
10	2	Sergey Kostylev	Russia	3:50.81	
11	2	Phil Spratley	New Zealand	3:50.82	
12	1	Bill Burke	United States	3:52.57	Q
13	1	Dejan Pajkić	Independent Participants	3:52.77	Q
14	1	Gary Lough	Great Britain	3:52.92	Q
15	1	Ahmed Ibrahim Warsama	Qatar	3:52.99	Q
16	1	Desmond English	Ireland	3:53.09	Q
17	1	Fabio Olivo	Italy	3:53.10	
18	1	Alex Davey	Australia	3:53.15	
19	1	Pierre Morath	Switzerland	3:53.48	
20	1	Eyvind Solbu	Norway	3:54.08	
21	1	Dmitriy Drozdov	Russia	3:54.75	
22	2	Kim Soon-hyung	South Korea	3:56.74	
23	1	Javier Soto	Puerto Rico	3:56.81	
24	1	Themba Makhanya	Swaziland	4:00.65	

=== Final ===
Rank	Athlete	Nationality	Time	Notes
1st place, gold medalist(s)	Abdelkader Chékhémani	France	3:46.32	
2nd place, silver medalist(s)	Bill Burke	United States	3:46.33	
3rd place, bronze medalist(s)	Gary Lough	Great Britain	3:46.77	
4	Allan Klassen	Canada	3:47.62	
5	Ahmed Ibrahim Warsama	Qatar	3:47.70	
6	Rich Kenah	United States	3:47.72	
7	Mark Carroll	Ireland	3:48.08	
8	Waldemar Glinka	Poland	3:48.73	
9	Andy Keith	Great Britain	3:48.89	
10	Dejan Pajkić	Independent Participants	3:49.40	
11	Mohamed Shawki Abdullah	Qatar	3:52.16	
12	Desmond English	Ireland	3:53.59	
