= Nick Howarth =

Australian middle-distance runner

Personal information
- Nationality: Australian
- Born: 24 June 1976 (age 50)

Sport
- Sport: Middle-distance running
- Event: 1500 metres

Nick Howarth (born 24 June 1976) is an Australian middle-distance runner. He competed in the men's 1500 metres at the 2000 Summer Olympics.
