= 2002 Asian Athletics Championships – Men's 800 metres =

The men's 800 metres event at the 2002 Asian Athletics Championships was held in Colombo, Sri Lanka on 10–12 August.

== Medalists ==
| Gold | Silver | Bronze |
|---|---|---|
| Mikhail Kolganov; Kazakhstan | Salem Amer Al-Badri; Qatar | Adam Abdu Adam Ali; Qatar |

== Results ==
=== Heats ===
| Rank | Heat | Name | Nationality | Time | Notes |
|---|---|---|---|---|---|
| 1 | 3 | Abdulkabir Louraïbi | Bahrain | 1:49.49 | Q |
| 2 | 3 | Sajjad Moradi | Iran | 1:50.96 | Q |
| 3 | 4 | Mikhail Kolganov | Kazakhstan | 1:51.69 | Q |
| 4 | 4 | K.A. Jayakumar | India | 1:52.38 | Q |
| 5 | 4 | John Lozada | Philippines | 1:52.56 | Q |
| 6 | 4 | Hisato Suzuki | Japan | 1:52.58 | q |
| 7 | 3 | Redouane Jaddouh | Syria | 1:52.84 | Q |
| 8 | 1 | Salem Amer Al-Badri | Qatar | 1:53.60 | Q |
| 9 | 1 | Manoj Pushpakumara | Sri Lanka | 1:53.80 | Q |
| 10 | 1 | Akinori Mori | Japan | 1:54.10 | Q |
| 11 | 1 | Cho Jae-Deuk | South Korea | 1:54.20 | q |
| 12 | 3 | Mohamed Sifrath | Sri Lanka | 1:54.50 | q, SB |
| 13 | 2 | Mehdi Jelodarzadeh | Iran | 1:54.79 | Q |
| 14 | 2 | Adam Abdu Adam Ali | Qatar | 1:55.14 | Q |
| 15 | 2 | Sasidharan Primesh Kumar | India | 1:55.36 | Q |
| 16 | 4 | Ziad Aoun | Lebanon | 1:55.64 | q, PB |
| 17 | 1 | Thamy Huran Singh | Nepal | 1:56.60 | PB |
| 18 | 3 | Chen Fu-Pin | Chinese Taipei | 1:57.96 | |
| 19 | 2 | Chidambaran Veeramani | Singapore | 1:58.21 | PB |
| 20 | 2 | Jimmy Anak Ahar | Brunei | 2:00.81 | |
| 21 | 3 | Lee Phongsanith | Laos | 2:05.52 | PB |
| 21 | 4 | Mohammad Al-Azemi | Kuwait | 2:05.52 | SB |
| | 1 | Nader Halawa | Palestine | DNS | |
| | 2 | Abdesalam Al-Dabaji | Palestine | DNS | |
| | 2 | Chaminda Indika Wijekoon | Sri Lanka | DNS | |

=== Semifinals ===
| Rank | Heat | Name | Nationality | Time | Notes |
|---|---|---|---|---|---|
| 1 | 2 | Abdulkabir Louraïbi | Bahrain | 1:50.09 | Q |
| 2 | 2 | Adam Abdu Adam Ali | Qatar | 1:50.17 | Q |
| 3 | 2 | Akinori Mori | Japan | 1:50.55 | Q |
| 4 | 1 | Mikhail Kolganov | Kazakhstan | 1:51.02 | Q |
| 5 | 2 | Mehdi Jelodarzadeh | Iran | 1:51.02 | q |
| 6 | 1 | Salem Amer Al-Badri | Qatar | 1:51.25 | Q |
| 7 | 1 | Sajjad Moradi | Iran | 1:51.29 | Q |
| 8 | 1 | Redouane Jaddouh | Syria | 1:51.?? | q |
| 9 | 2 | Manoj Pushpakumara | Sri Lanka | 1:51.63 | |
| 10 | 2 | Sasidharan Primesh Kumar | India | 1:51.09 | |
| 11 | 1 | John Lozada | Philippines | 1:52.59 | |
| 12 | 1 | K.A. Jayakumar | India | 1:52.77 | |
| 13 | 1 | Hisato Suzuki | Japan | 1:53.43 | |
| 14 | 2 | Ziad Aoun | Lebanon | 1:55.78 | |
| 15 | 2 | Cho Jae-Deuk | South Korea | 1:56.31 | |
| | 1 | Mohamed Sifrath | Sri Lanka | DQ | |

=== Final ===
| Rank | Name | Nationality | Time | Notes |
|---|---|---|---|---|
| 1st place, gold medalist(s) | Mikhail Kolganov | Kazakhstan | 1:48.91 | |
| 2nd place, silver medalist(s) | Salem Amer Al-Badri | Qatar | 1:48.95 | |
| 3rd place, bronze medalist(s) | Adam Abdu Adam Ali | Qatar | 1:49.25 | |
| 4 | Abdulkabir Louraïbi | Bahrain | 1:49.55 | |
| 5 | Redouane Jaddouh | Syria | 1:49.98 | |
| 6 | Akinori Mori | Japan | 1:50.40 | |
| 7 | Sajjad Moradi | Iran | 1:51.72 | |
| | Mehdi Jelodarzadeh | Iran | DQ | |
