= Mehdi Jelodarzadeh =

Iranian middle-distance runner

Medal record

Men's athletics

Representing Iran

Asian Championships
Gold medal – first place	2000 Jakarta	800 m

Mehdi Jelodarzadeh Sedei (Persian: مهدی جلودارزاده, born 8 September 1978) is a retired Iranian athlete who specialised in the 800 metres. He represented his country at the 2000 Summer Olympics failing to reach the semifinals.

His personal best in the event is 1:47.8 from 2000.

== Competition record ==
Year	Competition	Venue	Position	Event	Notes
Representing Iran
1996	Asian Junior Championships	New Delhi, India	1st	800 m	1:52.46
1997	West Asian Games	Tehran, Iran	3rd	400 m	49.07
1997	West Asian Games	Tehran, Iran	3rd	800 m	1:55.58
1998	Asian Games	Bangkok, Thailand	6th	800 m	1:48.58
2000	Asian Championships	Jakarta, Indonesia	1st	800 m	1:49.80
2000	Olympic Games	Sydney, Australia	32nd (h)	800 m	1:47.91
2002	Asian Championships	Colombo, Sri Lanka	5th (sf)	800 m	1:51.02
2002	Asian Championships	Colombo, Sri Lanka	–	1500 m	DNF
2002	Asian Games	Busan, South Korea	10th (h)	800 m	1:49.13
2002	Asian Games	Busan, South Korea	–	1500 m	DNF
