= Gary Lough =

British middle-distance runner

Personal information
- Nationality: Northern Irish
- Born: 6 July 1970 (age 55) County Antrim, Northern Ireland

Sport
- Sport: Athletics
- Event: Middle-distance
- Club: Loughborough University; Annadale Striders
Medal record
Representing Great Britain
Universiade
Bronze medal – third place	1993 Buffalo	1500 m
European Cup
Bronze medal – third place	1993 Birmingham	1500 m

Gareth "Gary" James Lough (born 6 July 1970) is a British male former middle-distance runner.

== Biography ==
Born in Larne Moyle Hospital in County Antrim, represented his country at the 1995 World Championships in Athletics, finishing the 1500 metres final in ninth place. He won 1500 m bronze medals internationally at the 1993 Summer Universiade and the 1994 European Cup. He also participated at the 1994 IAAF World Cup and the 1996 European Cup.

Lough competed for the Iowa State Cyclones track and field team in the NCAA.

At the top national level he reached the podium three times. He was third in the 1500 m at the 1993 UK Athletics Championships, third over 800 m at the 1995 AAA Championships, and third in the 1500 m at the 1994 AAA Championships. He was a four-time Northern Irish national champion in the 800 metres, taking straight victories from 1990 to 1993. He was twice champion at the BUCS British Universities Athletics Championships, winning the 1500m title in both 1991 and 1995.

Lough attended Loughborough University and it was there that he met fellow student-athlete Paula Radcliffe and the two became friends. Five years after the pair began dating and later married, having two children: a daughter, Isla (2007), and a son, Raphael (2010). Lough suffered a knee injury which curtailed his competitive career and instead focused on training and managing his wife's career. Radcliffe set the world record in the marathon while working with her husband. He drew public criticism for his coaching style after her fourth-place performance at the 2001 World Championships in Athletics. Radcliffe was distraught at missing a medal and Lough's trackside remonstration of her tactics was shown on television. Lough later apologised to his wife and the public for his reaction.

Lough began working with multiple Olympic champion Mo Farah in February 2018, with Farah remarking that he appreciated Lough's strong will and attention to detail as a coach.

== Personal bests ==
- 1500 metres – 3:34.76 min (1995)
- Mile run – 3:55.91 min (1995)
- 3000 metres – 7:49.45 min (1995)
- 3000 metres steeplechase – 8:26.33 min (1996)

== International competitions ==
Year	Competition	Venue	Position	Event	Notes
1993	Universiade	Buffalo, United States	3rd	1500 m	3:46.77
1994	European Cup	Birmingham, United Kingdom	3rd	1500 m	3:49.57
1994	World Cup	London, United Kingdom	5th	1500 m	3:44.10
1995	World Championships	Gothenburg, Sweden	9th	1500 m	3:37.59
1996	European Cup	Madrid, Spain	8th	3000 m	8:11.44

== National titles ==
- Northern Irish Athletics Championships
  - 800 m: 1990, 1991, 1992, 1993
