= Erkinjon Isakov =

Uzbekistani track and field athlete

Personal information
- Born: 25 November 1974 (age 51)

Sport
- Sport: Track and field

Erkinjon Tulkinovich Isakov (Cyrillic: Эркинжон Тулкинович Исаков; born 25 November 1974) is a retired Uzbekistani athlete who competed in the 400 metres hurdles before moving up to middle distance events. He twice represented his country at the Olympic Games, in 2000 and 2004, failing to advance to the semifinals.

Before 2000 he represented Russia.

== Competition record ==
Year	Competition	Venue	Position	Event	Notes
Representing Russia
1999	Universiade	Palma de Mallorca, Spain	24th (h)	400 m hurdles	51.49
1999	Universiade	Palma de Mallorca, Spain	7th (h)	4 × 400 m relay	3:12.32
Representing Uzbekistan
2000	Asian Championships	Jakarta, Indonesia	7th	400 m hurdles	51.27
2000	Olympic Games	Sydney, Australia	31st (h)	400 m hurdles	50.71
2002	Asian Games	Busan, South Korea	7th	800 m	1:48.39
2002	Asian Games	Busan, South Korea	15th	1500 m	3:52.06
2003	Asian Championships	Manila, Philippines	5th	800 m	1:49.05
2004	Olympic Games	Athens, Greece	54th (h)	800 m	1:48.28

== Personal bests ==
Outdoor

- 800 metres – 1:46.98 (Bishkek 2004) NR
- 1500 metres – 3:47.48 (Tula 2003)
- 400 metres hurdles – 50.11 (Bangkok 2000)

Indoor

- 800 metres – 1:47.97 (Tashkent 2001) NR
- 1000 metres – 2:25.02 (Moscow 2006) NR
- 1500 metres – 3:54.56 (Volgograd 2005)
