= Reyes Estévez =

Spanish middle-distance runner

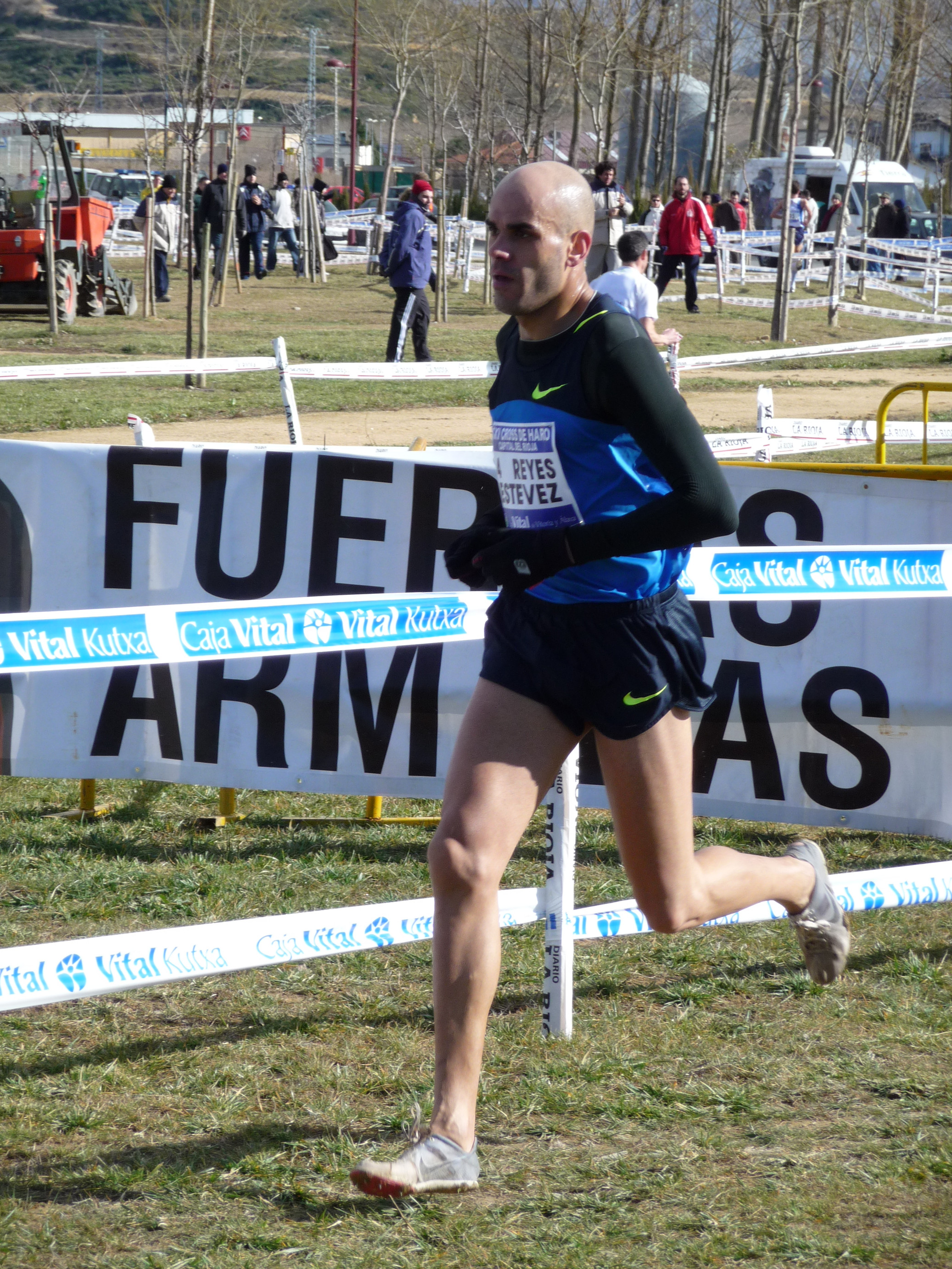

Medal record

Men's Athletics

Representing Spain

World Championships
Bronze medal – third place	1997 Athens	1500 m
Bronze medal – third place	1999 Sevilla	1500 m

European Championships
Gold medal – first place	1998 Budapest	1500 m
Silver medal – second place	2002 Munich	1500 m

World Indoor Championships
Silver medal – second place	2001 Lisbon	1500 m

European Indoor Championships
Bronze medal – third place	2005 Madrid	1500 m
Bronze medal – third place	2005 Madrid	3000 m

European U23 Championships
Gold medal – first place	1997 Turku	1500 m

Reyes Estévez López (born 2 August 1976 in Cornellà de Llobregat, Spain) is a Spanish 1500 metres runner. He won the European Championships' final 1998 in Budapest. In addition, he won bronze medals at the 1997 World Championships, 1999 World Championships and 2005 European Indoor Championships (both 1500 and 3000 m) and silver medals at the 2001 IAAF World Indoor Championships and 2002 European Championships.

On 9 December 2010 Reyes Estévez López was arrested and questioned in relation to his involvement in a Spanish sports doping ring as part of the Guardia Civil's Operation Galgo.

== Achievements ==
Year	Competition	Venue	Position	Event	Notes
Representing Spain
1994	World Junior Championships	Lisbon, Portugal	4th	1500m	3:42.98
1997	European U23 Championships	Turku, Finland	1st	1500 m	3:42.37
2010	Ibero-American Championships	San Fernando, Spain	2nd	3000 m	8:15.58
2010	European Championships	Barcelona, Spain	4th	1500 m	3:43.67
