= Mateu Cañellas =

Spanish middle-distance runner

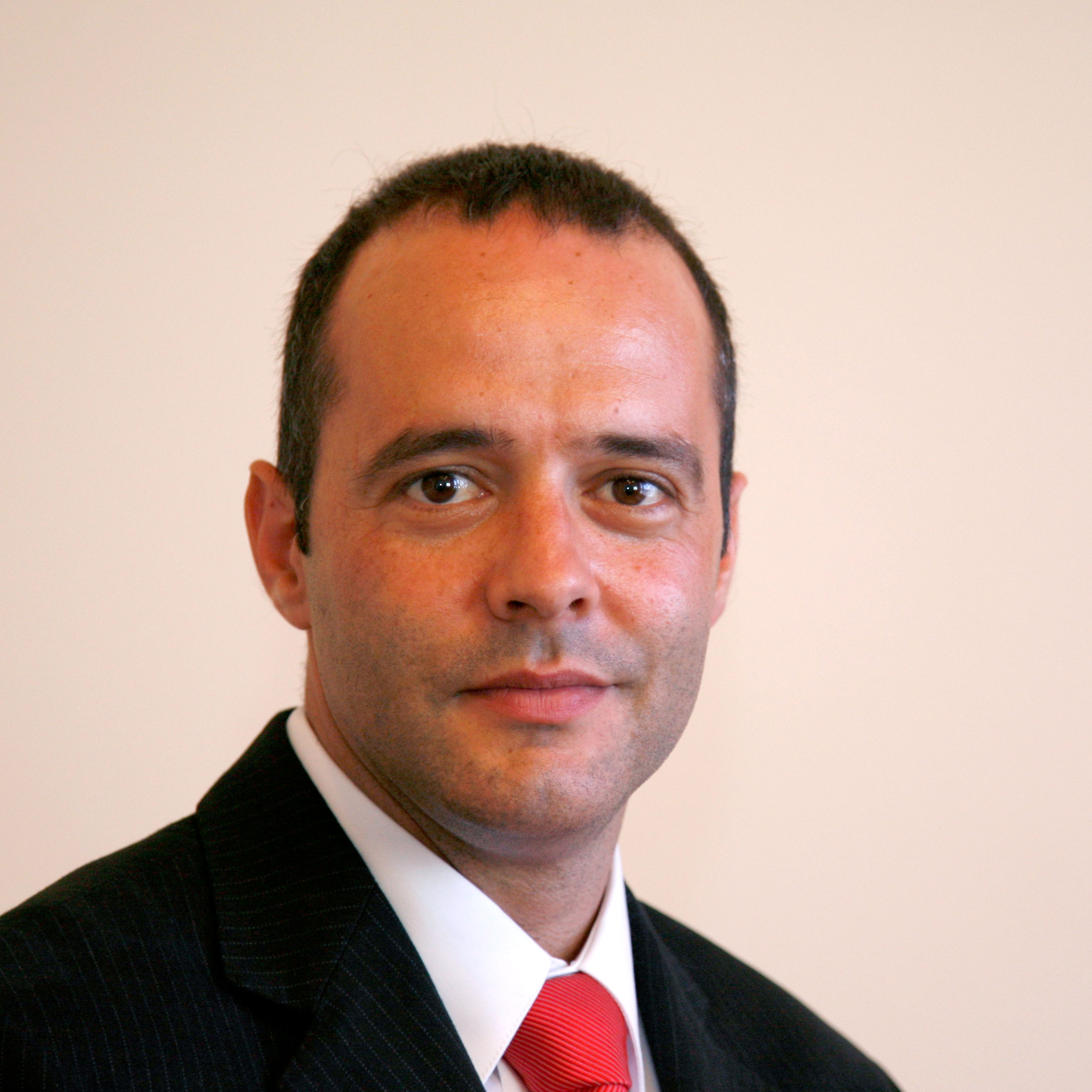

Minister of Sports and Youth of the Balearic Islands
- In office 9 July 2007 – 5 February 2010
- President: Francesc Antich
- Preceded by: Rosa Puig (Presidency and Sports)
- Succeeded by: Carlos Delgado (2011) (Tourism and Sports)

Personal details
- Born: Mateo Cañellas Martorell; 27 April 1972 (age 53) Inca, Spain
- Party: Majorcan Union

Mateo Cañellas Martorell, commonly known as Mateu Cañellas (born 27 April 1972 in Inca, Mallorca), is a retired Spanish middle distance runner and former politician. He served as Minister of Sports and Youth of the Baleric Islands from 2007 to 2010 in the Antich II government. He was a member of the regionalist party Majorcan Union. In 2011, he was accused of being a part of a corruption case in his party, and given liberty with charges, until in 2016 he was acquitted.

== Achievements ==
Year	Competition	Venue	Position	Event	Notes
Representing Spain
1990	World Junior Championships	Plovdiv, Bulgaria	32nd (h)	1500m	3:55.57
1991	European Junior Championships	Thessaloniki, Greece	1st	1500 m	3:53.11
1992	European Indoor Championships	Genoa, Italy	9th	1500 m	3:51.15
1994	European Indoor Championships	Paris, France	18th (h)	1500 m	3:51.10
1995	World Indoor Championships	Barcelona, Spain	2nd	1500 m	3:44.85
1995	World Championships	Gothenburg, Sweden	40th (h)	1500 m	3:49.71
1996	European Indoor Championships	Stockholm, Sweden	1st	1500 m	3:44.50
