= Đorđe Milić (runner) =

Serbian middle-distance runner (born 1972)

Personal information
- Nationality: Serbian^{1}
- Born: 12 October 1972 (age 54) Belgrade, Yugoslavia

Sport
- Sport: Track
- Events: 1500 meters, mile

Achievements and titles
- Personal best: 1500m: 3:40.1

Đorđe Milić (born 12 October 1972), sometimes spelled as George Milic, is a Serbian retired middle-distance track athlete. He competed for FR Yugoslavia in the men's 1500 meters at two Summer Universiade competitions, in 1997 and 1999. He subsequently moved to the United States where he competed as an elite miler. Officially, his lifetime best in the mile is listed as 4:00.97 according to multiple sources. However it was reported that he once ran 3:57.

== Running career ==
Milić was mentored by Yugoslav-record holder for the men's 1500 meters, Dragan Zdravković. Milić trained with AK Partizan up until he left Yugoslavia, and by the end of his spell with Partizan's track club, he had posted the club's third fastest men's 1500 meter time in history. At the 1997 Summer Universiade, he finished in seventh overall in the men's 1500 meters. He also made an appearance in the men's 1500 at the 1999 Summer Universiade, although he did not place past the qualifying rounds.

He then moved to the United States, where he trained professionally with West Side Runners (sometimes in meet lists spelled as WSX/WSX TC) in New York City. After a few years of training, he posted a mile time of 4:00.97 at the 2002 New Balance Brunswick Maine Distance Festival, placing sixth in a competitive field which included Graham Hood and Nate Brannen. Milić also ran the mile at the 2003 New Balance Games. Eventually, he would switch clubs and run with Westchester Puma, with whom he won the indoor men's mile at the 2003 GBTC Invitational at Harvard University.

== Later career ==
He went on to manage a running store in Westchester County, New York. When invited to a debate with a physical therapist on barefoot runners, he expressed skepticism of barefoot running. He refused to sell Vibrams in his store because he felt that they may pose long-term risks to his customers.

== Notes ==
- ^1 Although Milić is of Serbian nationality, his presence in international athletic competition dates before the Constitutional Charter of Serbia and Montenegro, so the country he represented in athletics is cited as (Federal Republic of) Yugoslavia as opposed to Serbia. Some of Milić's personal best results are maintained by Serbia's Athletic Association as Serbian results.
