= Mikhail Kolganov (runner) =

Kazakhstani middle-distance runner

Medal record

Men's athletics

Representing Kazakhstan

Asian Championships
Gold medal – first place	2002 Colombo	800 m

Mihail Kolganov (born 9 May 1980) is a Kazakhstani former middle-distance runner who specialized in the 800 and 1500 metres.

In the 800 metres he won the gold medal at the 2002 Asian Championships and finished seventh at the 2002 World Cup. He also competed at the 2004 Olympic Games, but did not progress past the first heat. His personal best time is 1:46.99 minutes, achieved in June 2004 in Almaty.

In the 1500 metres he finished twelfth at the 2003 Universiade, tenth at the 2005 Universiade and fifth at the 2005 Asian Championships. His personal best time is 3:45.65 minutes, achieved in June 2006 in Tula.

He also finished seventh in the 4x400 metres relay at the 2005 Summer Universiade.

== Achievements ==
Year	Competition	Venue	Position	Event	Notes
Representing Kazakhstan
1999	Asian Junior Championships	Singapore	4th	1500 m	3:47.04
2001	East Asian Games	Osaka, Japan	1st	800 m	1:49.00
2001	East Asian Games	Osaka, Japan	1st	1500 m	3:46.43
2002	Asian Championships	Colombo, Sri Lanka	1st	800 m	1:48.91
2002	Asian Championships	Colombo, Sri Lanka	–	1500 m	DNF
2002	Asian Games	Busan, South Korea	4th	800 m	1:47.89
2002	Asian Games	Busan, South Korea	9th	1500 m	3:49.64
2003	Universiade	Daegu, South Korea	3rd (h)	800 m	1:49.51^{1}
2003	Universiade	Daegu, South Korea	12th	1500 m	3:48.56
2004	Asian Indoor Championships	Tehran, Iran	4th	800 m	1:48.97
2004	Asian Indoor Championships	Tehran, Iran	4th	1500 m	3:58.40
2004	Olympic Games	Athens, Greece	39th (h)	800 m	1:47.36
2005	Universiade	İzmir, Turkey	10th	1500 m	3:53.97
2005	Universiade	İzmir, Turkey	7th	4 × 400 m relay	3:09.92
2005	Asian Championships	Incheon, South Korea	5th	1500 m	3:47.45

^{1}Did not start in the semifinal
