= Chungus =

Chungus may refer to:

- "Chungus", a neologism associated with British-American video game commentator James Stephanie Sterling
- "Big Chungus", an internet meme inspired by the cartoon Wabbit Twouble
- General Chungus, a character in A Minecraft Movie

== See also ==
- Chungu (disambiguation)
