= Athletics at the 1998 Commonwealth Games – Men's 1500 metres =

Men's 1500 metres at the Commonwealth Games

The men's 1500 metres event at the 1998 Commonwealth Games was held 20–21 September on National Stadium, Bukit Jalil.

== Medalists ==
Gold	Silver	Bronze
Laban Rotich; Kenya	John Mayock; England	Anthony Whiteman; England

== Results ==
=== Heats ===
Qualification: First 4 of each heat (Q) and the next 4 fastest (q) qualified for the semifinals.

Rank	Heat	Name	Nationality	Time	Notes
1	1	Anthony Whiteman	England	3:45.18	Q
2	1	John Kibowen	Kenya	3:45.55	Q
3	1	Christian Stephenson	Wales	3:45.75	Q
4	1	Kevin McKay	England	3:46.18	Q
5	2	Laban Rotich	Kenya	3:46.71	Q
6	1	Terrance Armstrong	Bermuda	3:46.80	q
7	1	Chipako Chungu	Zambia	3:47.19	q, PB
8	2	John Mayock	England	3:47.28	Q
9	2	Stephen Agar	Canada	3:47.38	Q
10	1	Stephen Green	Jamaica	3:47.48	q
11	2	Hamish Christensen	New Zealand	3:47.60	Q
12	2	Arumugam Munusamy	Malaysia	3:48.34	q
13	1	Dave Pamah	Saint Vincent and the Grenadines	3:54.87	
14	2	Nickie Peters	Saint Vincent and the Grenadines	4:05.27	
15	2	Hussain Riyaz	Maldives	4:05.44	
16	2	Gerard Solomon	Vanuatu	4:10.63	
	1	Dale Jones	Antigua and Barbuda	DNS	
	1	Chris Votu	Solomon Islands	DNS	
	2	Eddie King	Northern Ireland	DNS	
	2	Selwyn Bonne	Seychelles	DNS	

=== Final ===
Rank	Name	Nationality	Time	Notes
1st place, gold medalist(s)	Laban Rotich	Kenya	3:39.49	
2nd place, silver medalist(s)	John Mayock	England	3:40.46	
3rd place, bronze medalist(s)	Anthony Whiteman	England	3:40.70	
4	John Kibowen	Kenya	3:42.71	
5	Kevin McKay	England	3:43.22	
6	Hamish Christensen	New Zealand	3:43.93	
7	Stephen Agar	Canada	3:44.17	
8	Terrance Armstrong	Bermuda	3:44.57	
9	Christian Stephenson	Wales	3:44.82	
10	Stephen Green	Jamaica	3:45.66	SB
11	Chipako Chungu	Zambia	3:47.02	PB
12	Arumugam Munusamy	Malaysia	3:47.70	
