= Bård Kvalheim =

Norwegian middle-distance runner

Personal information
- Born: 17 September 1973 (age 53) Oslo, Norway

Sport
- Sport: Track and field

Bård Kvalheim (born 17 September 1973) is a Norwegian retired athlete. He is a middle distance runner, with 1500 metres as his best distance (personal record: 3:40.12). He represents IK Tjalve in Oslo.

He took part in the 1500 m at the 2006 European Athletics Championships in Gothenburg. He has national gold from 2005, silver from 2003 and 2006 and bronze from 2002.

Bård Kvalheim is the son of athlete Knut Kvalheim.
