= Chungu Chipako =

Zambian middle-distance runner

Personal information
- Nationality: Zambian
- Born: 27 January 1971 (age 55)

Sport
- Sport: Middle-distance running
- Event: 1500 metres

Chungu Chipako (born 27 January 1971) is a Zambian middle-distance runner. He competed in the men's 1500 metres at the 2000 Summer Olympics.
