= William Chirchir =

Kenyan runner (born 1979)

William Chirchir (born 6 February 1979, in Bomet) is a Kenyan runner who specializes in the 1500 metres. He is a former holder of the world junior record over the distance with 3:33.24 minutes from 1998.

== Achievements ==
Year	Competition	Venue	Position	Event	Notes
Representing Kenya
1998	World Junior Championships	Annecy, France	1st	800 m	1:47.23
1999	Grand Prix Final	Munich, Germany	5th	800 m	1:44.75
2001	World Championships	Edmonton, Canada	4th	1500 m	3:31.91
2001	Grand Prix Final	Melbourne, Australia	3rd	1500 m	3:34.06
2002	Commonwealth Games	Manchester, United Kingdom	2nd	1500 m	3:37.70
2002	Grand Prix Final	Paris, France	9th	1500 m	3:39.11

=== Personal bests ===
- 800 metres - 1:43.33 min (1999)
- 1500 metres - 3:29.29 min (2001)
- One mile - 3:47.94 min (2000)
- 3000 metres - 7:55.78 min (1998)
