= Lorenzo Lazzari =

Italian middle-distance runner

Personal information
- National team: Italy (9 caps from 1995 to 2002)
- Born: 23 August 1974 (age 52) Bergamo, Italy

Sport
- Country: Italy
- Sport: Athletics
- Event: Middle-distance running
- Club: G.S. Fiamme Oro

Achievements and titles
- Personal bests: 800 m: 1:48.12 (1998); 1500 m: 3:37.00 (1998); Mile: 3:55.89 (1999); 800 m indoor: 1:51.62 (2002); 1500 m indoor: 3:42.82 (2000)
Medal record
Universiade
Bronze medal – third place	1999 Palma de Mallorca	1500 m

Lorenzo Lazzari (born 23 August 1974) is a former Italian male middle-distance runner who won a bronze medal at the 1999 Summer Universiade.

== Biography ==
Lazzari won four national titles at senior level. In add of this in 1998, establishing his Personal Best with 3:37.00 in 1500 metres, he had reached the 24th place in the seasonal world lists. He also participated at the 2002 IAAF World Cross Country Championships at individual senior level.

== Achievements ==
Year	Competition	Venue	Position	Event	Time	Notes
1999	Universiade	(Italy) Palma de Mallorca	3rd	1500 m	3:42.36	
2000	European Indoor Championships	(Belgium) Ghent	12th	1500 m	3:51.60	
2002	European Championships	(Germany) Munich	20th	1500 m	3:49.06	

== National titles ==
He won 5 national championships at individual senior level.

- Italian Athletics Championships
  - 1500 metres: 1998, 1999, 2001
- Italian Indoor Athletics Championships
  - 1500 metres: 2002
