= Hailu Zewde =

Ethiopian middle-distance runner

Personal information
- Nationality: Ethiopian
- Born: 13 September 1974 (age 51)

Sport
- Sport: Middle-distance running
- Event: 1500 metres

Hailu Zewde (born 13 September 1974) is an Ethiopian middle-distance runner. He competed in the men's 1500 metres at the 1992 Summer Olympics.
