= Rashid Mohamed =

Bahraini runner (born 1979)

Medal record

Men's athletics

Representing Bahrain

Asian Championships
Bronze medal – third place	2003 Manila	800 m

Rashid Mohamed (born Rachid Khouia; 9 November 1979 in Salé, Morocco) is a Bahraini runner. He specializes in the 800 metres. His personal best time is 1:45.38 minutes, achieved in June 1999 in Milan.

== Career ==
Mohamed switched nationality from his birth country of Morocco in 2002 and soon won the 2002 Asian Games. This was Bahrain's first Asian Games medal since 1986. The next year, he won the bronze medal at the 2003 Asian Championships. Mohamed also competed at the World Championships in 1999 and 2003 without reaching the final.

== Achievements ==
Year	Competition	Venue	Position	Notes
Representing Bahrain
2003	Asian Championships	Manila, Philippines	3rd	800 m
