= Lee Jae-hun (athlete) =

South Korean middle-distance runner

Personal information
- Nationality: South Korean
- Born: 28 November 1976 (age 49)

Sport
- Sport: Middle-distance running
- Event: 800 metres
Medal record
Men's athletics
Representing South Korea
Asian Championships
Bronze medal – third place	2000 Jakarta	800 m

Lee Jae-hun (born 28 November 1976) is a South Korean middle-distance runner. He competed in the men's 800 metres at the 2004 Summer Olympics.
