= Kevin Sullivan (runner) =

Canadian athletics competitor (born 1974)

Personal information
- Born: March 20, 1974 (age 52) Brantford, Ontario
- Education: University of Michigan
- Height: 5 ft 11 in (180 cm)
- Weight: 147 lb (67 kg; 10 st 7 lb)

Sport
- Country: Canada
- Sport: Track and field
- Event(s): 1500 m, Mile
- University team: Michigan Wolverines
- Now coaching: Michigan Wolverines
- Personal bests: 1500 m: 3:31.71 NR; Mile: 3:50.26 NR
Medal record
Track and field
Representing Canada
Commonwealth Games
| Silver medal – second place | 1994 Victoria | 1500 m |
World Junior Championships
| Bronze medal – third place | 1992 Seoul | 1500 m |

Kevin Sullivan (born March 20, 1974) is a retired Canadian middle-distance runner who holds the Canadian records in the 1500 m and the mile. Since 2014, he has served as the head coach of the track and field and cross country teams at his alma mater, the University of Michigan

== Personal life ==
Sullivan studied civil engineering at the University of Michigan where he had 14 All-American honours and won 4 NCAA titles (one relay and 3 individual). Sulivan's father, Richard, is a machinist. He has two brothers, Darren and Colin. He played hockey and soccer while growing up in Brantford. Kevin is Married to Ilora Cipolat a former track and field Coach at West Virginia University. Kevin and Ilora are the parents of Cian Sullivan. The couple reside live in Ann Arbor, Michigan

== Athletics career ==
Sullivan competed in 1000 metres, 1500 metres, and mile events and represented Canada. His personal best times are 3:31.71 for the 1500 (set in June 2000) and 3:50.36 for the mile. He is the former Canadian record-holder for the indoor 3000 m, 7:40.17 (set February 9, 2007). His best Olympic showing is a fifth-place finish at Sydney. In 2005, he left his longtime Michigan coach, Ron Warhurst, to train under the coaching of Juli Henner. In the 2008 Summer Olympics, Sullivan reached the semi-finals of the 1500 metres but failed to qualify for the final. Sullivan was also a torchbearer for the 2010 Winter Olympics, carrying the torch into Brantford.

Sullivan was an assistant coach at Michigan in the early 2000s. He was a volunteer assistant coach at the University of Illinois at Urbana-Champaign and a coach at Florida State University.

Sullivan has been named one of the greatest Canadian distance runners of all time, concerning his placings in international competition, having competed at 3 Olympic Games, 22 World Championships (outdoors, indoors, and cross country), and still holding 4 Canadian track and field records including 3 outdoor and 1 indoor.

=== Personal bests ===
| Event | Best | Location | Date |
|---|---|---|---|
| 800 metres | 1:47.06 | Baton Rouge, LA, United States | 1 January 1995 |
| 1000 metres | 2:17.59 | Athens, Greece | 28 June 2000 |
| 1500 metres | 3:31.71 | Rome, Italy | 30 June 2000 |
| Mile | 3:50.26 | Oslo, Norway | 28 July 2000 |
| 2000 metres | 5:04.35 | Gateshead, England | 19 July 1998 |
| 3000 metres | 7:41.61 | Stockholm, Sweden | 22 July 2008 |
| 5000 metres | 13:19.27 | Walnut, CA, United States | 13 April 2007 |

== Coaching career ==
Sullivan is the men's distance & cross country head coach at University of Michigan. In his first year, the Michigan Wolverines qualified for the NCAA Division 1 Cross Country Championships under his leadership. Kevin took this position in 2014, after years of successful coaching at Florida State University where he assisted his wife coaching the women's distance team. Kevin also coached at University of Illinois at Urbana-Champaign.

== See also ==
- Canadian records in track and field
- Michigan Wolverines men's track and field
