= Kiyonari Shibata =

Japanese middle-distance runner

Medal record

Men's athletics

Representing Japan

East Asian Games
Gold medal – first place	1997 Busan	1500 m

Asian Athletics Championships
Silver medal – second place	1998 Fukuoka	1500 m

Kiyonari Shibata (Japanese: 柴田 清成; born 27 March 1973) is a Japanese former track and field athlete and middle-distance runner.

He is the current Japanese record holder for the mile run, with a personal best of 3:58.89 minutes. His time, set on 11 May 1996, made him the second Japanese man to run a sub-four-minute mile, after Takashi Ishii, who had done so nearly twenty years earlier in 1977. Shibata's 1500 metres best of 3:39.45 minutes is also among the best times for the event by a Japanese, behind Fumikazu Kobayashi and Ishii.

Despite his breaking a long-standing national record, Shibata only won at the Japan Championships in Athletics on one occasion, taking the 1500 m title in 1997. That same year he won a gold medal in the event at the East Asian Games in a then games record time of 3:49.90 minutes. The following year he won the second and final international medal of his career at the 1998 Asian Athletics Championships by finishing as runner-up behind multiple Asian champion Mohamed Suleiman. He also ran at the 1998 Asian Games and placed seventh in the 1500 m final.

He represented his home region, Toyama Prefecture, twice at the All-Japan Interprefectural Ekiden Championships.
