= Carlos García (runner) =

Spanish long-distance runner

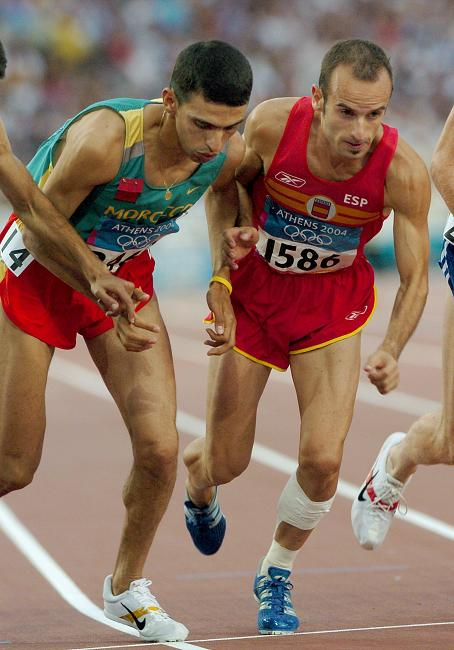
- Carlos García (right) in 2004

Personal information
- Nationality: Spanish
- Born: 20 August 1975 (age 51) Zaragoza, Spain

Sport
- Sport: Long-distance running
- Event: 5000 metres
Medal record
Representing Spain
Summer Universiade
Silver medal – second place	1997 Catania	1500m

Carlos García (born 20 August 1975) is a Spanish long-distance runner. He competed in the men's 5000 metres at the 2004 Summer Olympics. His twin brother Roberto García is also an Olympic runner.
