= Dubus =

Dubus is a surname. Notable people with the surname include:

- Alexis Dubus (born 1979), English comedian and actor
- Andre Dubus (1936–1999), American writer
- Andre Dubus III (born 1959), American writer
- Éric Dubus (born 1966), French middle distance runner
- Leon Dubus (Léon Dubus, 1894–1981), French electrical engineer and philatelist
- Mathieu Dubus (c. 1590 – c. 1665), a Flemish-Dutch landscape painter
