= 2000 European Athletics Indoor Championships – Men's 3000 metres =

The men's 3000 metres event at the 2000 European Athletics Indoor Championships was held on February 25–27.

== Medalists ==
| Gold | Silver | Bronze |
|---|---|---|
| Mark Carroll; Ireland | Rui Silva; Portugal | John Mayock; Great Britain |

== Results ==
=== Heats ===
First 4 of each heat (Q) and the next 4 fastest (q) qualified for the final.

| Rank | Heat | Name | Nationality | Time | Notes |
|---|---|---|---|---|---|
| 1 | 2 | Mohammed Mourhit | Belgium | 7:54.09 | Q |
| 2 | 2 | Mark Carroll | Ireland | 7:54.86 | Q |
| 3 | 2 | John Mayock | Great Britain | 7:55.10 | Q |
| 4 | 2 | Andrés Manuel Díaz | Spain | 7:55.46 | Q |
| 5 | 2 | Yousef El Nasri | Spain | 7:56.21 | q |
| 6 | 2 | Nadir Bosch | France | 7:56.47 | q |
| 7 | 2 | Sergey Drygin | Russia | 7:56.76 | q, SB |
| 8 | 1 | Gennaro Di Napoli | Italy | 7:57.06 | Q |
| 9 | 1 | Jesus de la Fuente | Spain | 7:57.19 | Q |
| 10 | 1 | Rui Silva | Portugal | 7:57.27 | Q |
| 11 | 1 | Kent Claesson | Sweden | 7:57.37 | Q |
| 12 | 1 | Miroslav Vanko | Slovakia | 7:57.54 | q |
| 13 | 1 | Christian Nemeth | Belgium | 8:03.81 | PB |
| 14 | 1 | Jan Fitschen | Germany | 8:04.36 | |
| 15 | 2 | Ovidiu Olteanu | Romania | 8:04.67 | |
| 16 | 2 | Harald Steindorfer | Austria | 8:04.78 | |
| 17 | 1 | Rob Whalley | Great Britain | 8:06.59 | |
| 18 | 2 | Martins Alksnis | Latvia | 8:06.94 | PB |
| 19 | 1 | Dmitro Baranovskiy | Ukraine | 8:07.41 | |
| 20 | 1 | Sander Schutgens | Netherlands | 8:13.31 | |
| 21 | 2 | Salvatore Vincenti | Italy | 8:13.64 | |
| | 1 | Panagiotis Papoulias | Greece | DNF | |

=== Final ===
| Rank | Name | Nationality | Time | Notes |
|---|---|---|---|---|
| 1st place, gold medalist(s) | Mark Carroll | Ireland | 7:49.24 | |
| 2nd place, silver medalist(s) | Rui Silva | Portugal | 7:49.70 | |
| 3rd place, bronze medalist(s) | John Mayock | Great Britain | 7:49.97 | SB |
| 4 | Mohammed Mourhit | Belgium | 7:49.99 | |
| 5 | Andrés Manuel Díaz | Spain | 7:53.97 | SB |
| 6 | Yousef El Nasri | Spain | 7:55.37 | |
| 7 | Gennaro Di Napoli | Italy | 7:55.51 | |
| 8 | Jesus de la Fuente | Spain | 7:56.13 | SB |
| 9 | Miroslav Vanko | Slovakia | 7:59.52 | |
| 10 | Kent Claesson | Sweden | 7:59.60 | |
| 11 | Sergey Drygin | Russia | 8:05.59 | |
| | Nadir Bosch | France | DNS | |
