= 1997 IAAF World Indoor Championships – Men's 3000 metres =

The men's 3000 metres event at the 1997 IAAF World Indoor Championships was held on 7–9 March 1997.

The winning margin was a decisive 4.13 seconds which as of July 2024 remains the only time the men's 3,000 metres was won by more than three seconds at these championships.

== Medalists ==
Gold	Silver	Bronze
Haile Gebrselassie; Ethiopia	Paul Bitok; Kenya	Ismaïl Sghyr; Morocco

== Results ==
=== Heats ===
First 4 of each heat (Q) and next 4 fastest (q) qualified for the final.

Rank	Heat	Name	Nationality	Time	Notes
1	2	Haile Gebrselassie	Ethiopia	7:50.14	Q
2	2	Ismaïl Sghyr	Morocco	7:50.42	Q
3	2	Paul Bitok	Kenya	7:51.53	Q
4	2	John Mayock	Great Britain	7:51.69	Q
5	2	Saïd Chébili	France	7:52.55	q, PB
6	2	Massimo Pegoretti	Italy	7:52.60	q
7	1	Gennaro Di Napoli	Italy	7:52.72	Q
8	2	Anacleto Jiménez	Spain	7:52.95	q, SB
9	1	Moses Kiptanui	Kenya	7:52.98	Q
10	2	Sergey Drygin	Russia	7:53.99	q
11	1	Fita Bayisa	Ethiopia	7:53.24	Q
12	1	El Hassan Lahssini	Morocco	7:53.53	Q
13	1	Carlos García	Spain	7:54.01	
14	2	Samuli Vasala	Finland	7:54.07	
15	1	Robert K. Andersen	Denmark	7:54.72	
16	1	Kamiel Maase	Netherlands	7:54.79	PB
17	1	Ian Grime	Great Britain	7:56.30	PB
18	2	Jason Bunston	Canada	7:56.75	
19	1	Reuben Reina	United States	7:57.00	
20	2	Ahmed Ibrahim Warsama	Qatar	8:00.64	
21	1	Mark Ostendarp	Germany	8:02.47	
22	2	Kent Claesson	Sweden	8:04.29	
23	1	Mark Carroll	Ireland	8:05.49	
24	2	Réda Benzine	Algeria	8:05.55	
25	1	Cândido Maia	Portugal	8:06.58	
26	1	Mark Hhawu	Tanzania	8:18.28	
27	2	Marc Davis	United States	8:20.37	

=== Final ===
Rank	Name	Nationality	Time	Notes
1st place, gold medalist(s)	Haile Gebrselassie	Ethiopia	7:34.71	CR
2nd place, silver medalist(s)	Paul Bitok	Kenya	7:38.84	
3rd place, bronze medalist(s)	Ismaïl Sghyr	Morocco	7:40.01	
4	Gennaro Di Napoli	Italy	7:41.05	NR
5	Moses Kiptanui	Kenya	7:41.87	
6	John Mayock	Great Britain	7:44.31	
7	Fita Bayisa	Ethiopia	7:49.47	
8	El Hassan Lahssini	Morocco	7:50.54	
9	Anacleto Jiménez	Spain	7:52.55	SB
10	Sergey Drygin	Russia	7:56.38	
11	Saïd Chébili	France	7:58.57	
12	Massimo Pegoretti	Italy	8:10.49	
