= 2001 IAAF World Indoor Championships – Men's 3000 metres =

The men's 3000 metres event at the 2001 IAAF World Indoor Championships was held on March 9–11.

== Medalists ==
Gold	Silver	Bronze
Hicham El Guerrouj; Morocco	Mohammed Mourhit; Belgium	Alberto García; Spain

== Results ==
=== Heats ===
First 5 of each heat (Q) and the next 2 fastest (q) qualified for the semifinals.

Rank	Heat	Name	Nationality	Time	Notes
1	2	Craig Mottram	Australia	7:50.21	Q, AR
2	2	Alberto García	Spain	7:50.84	Q
3	2	Bernard Lagat	Kenya	7:50.93	Q
4	2	Mohammed Mourhit	Belgium	7:50.99	Q
5	2	Saïd Berioui	Morocco	7:51.07	Q
6	2	John Mayock	Great Britain	7:51.10	q
7	2	Mark Carroll	Ireland	7:53.64	q
8	2	Youcef Allem	Algeria	7:56.42	
9	2	Eric Dubus	France	7:58.09	
10	1	Hicham El Guerrouj	Morocco	8:05.50	Q
11	1	Million Wolde	Ethiopia	8:06.11	Q
12	1	Bouabdallah Tahri	France	8:06.13	Q
13	1	Paul Bitok	Kenya	8:06.13	Q
14	1	Antonio Jiménez	Spain	8:06.18	Q
15	1	Mohamed Khaldi	Algeria	8:06.18	q
16	1	Tim Broe	United States	8:09.37	
17	1	Yaroslav Mushinskiy	Moldova	8:21.85	
18	1	Tau Khotso	Lesotho	8:26.83	
19	2	Oumarou Souley	Niger	8:44.25	
20	2	Djamched Rasulov	Tajikistan	8:44.53	
	1	Tshindind Kassap	Democratic Republic of the Congo	DNS	
	1	Yawo Kloutse	Togo	DNS	

=== Final ===
Rank	Name	Nationality	Time	Notes
1st place, gold medalist(s)	Hicham El Guerrouj	Morocco	7:37.74	
2nd place, silver medalist(s)	Mohammed Mourhit	Belgium	7:38.94	NR
3rd place, bronze medalist(s)	Alberto García	Spain	7:39.96	PB
4	John Mayock	Great Britain	7:44.08	
5	Million Wolde	Ethiopia	7:44.54	
6	Bernard Lagat	Kenya	7:45.52	
7	Mark Carroll	Ireland	7:46.79	
8	Craig Mottram	Australia	7:48.34	AR
9	Mohamed Khaldi	Algeria	7:52.76	
10	Paul Bitok	Kenya	7:54.16	
11	Bouabdallah Tahri	France	7:57.84	
12	Antonio Jiménez	Spain	8:04.01	
13	Saïd Berioui	Morocco	8:04.38	
