= Christos Papoulias =

Greek runner

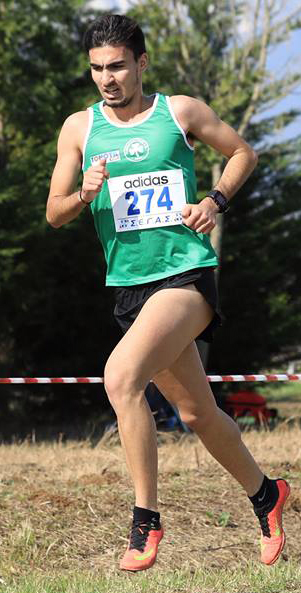

Personal information
- Nationality: Greek
- Born: 17 June 1998 (age 28) Athens
- Height: 174 cm (5 ft 9 in)
- Weight: 64 kg (141 lb)

Sport
- Country: Greece
- Sport: Middle-distance running, Long-distance running
- Events: 800 metres, 1500 metres, 3000 metres, 5000 metres
- Club: Panathinaikos

Achievements and titles
- Personal bests: 800 metres: 1:54.49 (2016); 80 metres ind.: 1:54.29 (2017); 1500 metres: 3:50.58 (2016); 1500 metres ind.: 3:57.71 (2017); 5000 metres: 8:38.91 (2016); 3000 metres: 15:22.01 (2016)
- Updated on 18 March 2017

Christos Papoulias (born 17 June 1998) is a Greek middle-distance and long-distance runner. Since December 2016 he was competing for Panathinaikos. Papoulias was born in Athens. He is the son of former track and field athlete Panagiotis Papoulias and has a brother, Anestis Papoulias, who is also a runner.
