= Pavlos =

- Gender: Male

Origin
- Origin: Latin

Other names
- Related names: Paul

Pavlos (Παυλος) or Pávlos (Πάυλος) is a masculine given name. It is a Greek form of Paul. It may refer to:

- Pavlos Argyriadis (1849–1901), Greek ethnically lawyer, journalist and anarchist and socialist intellectual
- Pavlos Bakoyannis (1935–1989), a liberal Greek politician
- Pavlos Beligratis (born 1977), Greek beach volleyball player
- Pavlos Carrer (1829–1896), a Greek composer
- Pavlos, Crown Prince of Greece (born 1967)
- Pavlos Dermitzakis (born 1969), Greek professional football manager and former player
- Pavlos Diakoulas, Greek retired American professional basketball player and coach
- Pavlos Emmanouilidis (born 1929), Greek former professional footballer
- Pavlos Fyssas (1979–2013), Greek rapper and murder victim
- Pavlos Geroulanos (born 1966), a Greek politician
- Pavlos Giannakopoulos (1928–2018), a Greek businessman
- Pavlos Haikalis (born 1958), a Greek actor and member of parliament
- Pavlos Kagialis (born 1984), Greek competitive sailor
- Pavlos Karakostas (1937–2002), a Greek author
- Pavlos Kountouriotis (1855–1935), a Greek naval hero, twice President of Greece
- Pavlos Kouroupis (1929–1974), a Greek officer in the Hellenic Army
- Pavlos Lespouridis (1958–2003), Greek weightlifter and coach
- Pavlos Mamalos (born 1971), Greek paralympic athlete in powerlifting
- Pavlos Melas (1870–1904), an officer of the Hellenic Army and hero in the Greek Struggle for Macedonia
- Pavlos Mousouros, the Ottoman-appointed Prince of Samos from 1866 to 1873
- Pavlos Pantelidis (born 2002), Greek footballer
- Pavlos Papaioannou (born 1959), a Greek footballer
- Pavlos Pavlidis (died 1968), a Greek shooter
- Pavlos Rodokanakis (1891–1958), Italian-born Greek painter
- Pavlos Sidiropoulos (1948–1990), Greek Rock musician
- Pavlos Stamelos (born 1950), Greek retired professional basketball player and coach
- Pavlos Tassios (1942–2011), Greek film director
- Pavlos Tzanavaras, Greek long-distance and trail runner
- Pavlos Valdaseridis (1892–1972), a Cypriot writer, translator, and playwright
- Pavlos Vartziotis (born 1981), Greek footballer
- Pavlos Voskopoulos (born 1964), Greek politician

== See also ==
- Agios Pavlos (Άγιος Παύλος), a Borough of Thessaloniki
- Apostolos Pavlos (Απόστολος Παύλος, meaning Paul the Apostle), a municipality in the Imathia Prefecture, Greece
- Pavlos Vrellis Museum of Hellenic History, a museum in Ioannina, Greece

== See also ==
- Irene Pavloska
- Paul (name)

(1889–1962), Canadian mezzo-soprano and composer
