= 2003 IAAF World Indoor Championships – Men's 3000 metres =

The men's 3000 metres event at the 2003 IAAF World Indoor Championships was held on March 14–16.

== Medalists ==
| Gold | Silver | Bronze |
|---|---|---|
| Haile Gebrselassie; Ethiopia | Alberto García; Spain | Luke Kipkosgei; Kenya |

== Results ==
=== Heats ===
First 4 of each heat (Q) and next 4 fastest (q) qualified for the semifinals.

| Rank | Heat | Name | Nationality | Time | Notes |
|---|---|---|---|---|---|
| 1 | 2 | Luke Kipkosgei | Kenya | 7:47.50 | Q |
| 2 | 2 | Abiyote Abate | Ethiopia | 7:47.57 | Q |
| 3 | 2 | Alberto García | Spain | 7:50.95 | Q |
| 4 | 1 | Haile Gebrselassie | Ethiopia | 7:51.43 | Q |
| 5 | 2 | Jaouad Gharib | Morocco | 7:51.59 | Q, PB |
| 6 | 2 | Günther Weidlinger | Austria | 7:51.94 | q |
| 7 | 1 | Gert-Jan Liefers | Netherlands | 7:51.95 | Q |
| 8 | 1 | Jesús España | Spain | 7:52.41 | Q |
| 9 | 1 | John Mayock | Great Britain | 7:52.59 | Q |
| 10 | 1 | Mohamed Khaldi | Algeria | 7:53.33 | q |
| 11 | 1 | Leonard Mucheru Maina | Kenya | 7:53.41 | q |
| 12 | 1 | Abderrahim Goumri | Morocco | 7:54.02 | q |
| 13 | 2 | Khoudir Aggoune | Algeria | 7:54.59 | SB |
| 14 | 1 | Bolota Asmerom | United States | 7:55.36 | |
| 15 | 2 | Jonathon Riley | United States | 8:02.94 | |
| 16 | 1 | Michael Aish | New Zealand | 8:03.17 | |
| 17 | 2 | Lorenzo Perrone | Italy | 8:04.00 | |
| 18 | 2 | Thomas Mayo | Great Britain | 8:07.37 | |
| 19 | 2 | Wu Wen-Chien | Chinese Taipei | 8:14.61 | |
| 20 | 1 | Joseph Simuchimba | Zambia | 8:20.10 | |
| 21 | 2 | Euclides Varela | Cape Verde | 8:29.10 | |
| 22 | 1 | Chris Votu | Solomon Islands | 9:03.84 | |
| 23 | 2 | Ajmal Amirov | Tajikistan | 9:04.53 | |
| | 1 | Mohammed Yagoub | Sudan | DNS | |

=== Final ===
| Rank | Name | Nationality | Time | Notes |
|---|---|---|---|---|
| 1st place, gold medalist(s) | Haile Gebrselassie | Ethiopia | 7:40.97 | |
| 2nd place, silver medalist(s) | Alberto García | Spain | 7:42.08 | |
| 3rd place, bronze medalist(s) | Luke Kipkosgei | Kenya | 7:42.56 | |
| 4 | Jesús España | Spain | 7:42.70 | PB |
| 5 | Abiyote Abate | Ethiopia | 7:43.21 | |
| 6 | Gert-Jan Liefers | Netherlands | 7:44.34 | NR |
| 7 | Leonard Mucheru Maina | Kenya | 7:44.83 | SB |
| 8 | John Mayock | Great Britain | 7:45.32 | SB |
| 9 | Abderrahim Goumri | Morocco | 7:47.43 | |
| 10 | Günther Weidlinger | Austria | 7:53.59 | |
| 11 | Mohamed Khaldi | Algeria | 7:56.05 | |
| 12 | Jaouad Gharib | Morocco | 8:01.01 | |
