= 1998 European Athletics Indoor Championships – Men's 3000 metres =

The men's 3000 metres event at the 1998 European Athletics Indoor Championships was held on 27 February–1 March.

== Medalists ==
Gold	Silver	Bronze
John Mayock; Great Britain	Manuel Pancorbo; Spain	Alberto García; Spain

== Results ==
=== Heats ===
First 4 from each heat (Q) and the next 4 fastest (q) qualified for the final.

Rank	Heat	Name	Nationality	Time	Notes
1	2	Alberto García	Spain	7:56.56	Q
2	2	Serhiy Lebid	Ukraine	7:57.14	Q
3	2	John Mayock	Great Britain	7:58.57	Q
4	2	Ovidiu Olteanu	Romania	7:58.99	Q
5	2	Éric Dubus	France	8:00.38	q
6	1	Massimo Pegoretti	Italy	8:01.62	Q
7	1	Isaac Viciosa	Spain	8:01.64	Q
8	1	Bouabdellah Tahri	France	8:01.76	Q
9	1	Manuel Pancorbo	Spain	8:01.80	Q
10	1	Panagiotis Papoulias	Greece	8:02.01	q
11	2	Halez Taguelmint	France	8:02.21	q
12	2	Hristos Papapetrou	Cyprus	8:02.61	q
13	1	Jim Svenøy	Norway	8:03.00	
14	1	Ian Gillespie	Great Britain	8:03.28	
15	1	Sergey Drygin	Russia	8:12.02	
16	2	Carsten Schütz	Germany	8:20.07	

=== Final ===
Rank	Name	Nationality	Time	Notes
1st place, gold medalist(s)	John Mayock	Great Britain	7:55.09	
2nd place, silver medalist(s)	Manuel Pancorbo	Spain	7:55.23	
3rd place, bronze medalist(s)	Alberto García	Spain	7:55.24	
4	Isaac Viciosa	Spain	7:55.45	
5	Serhiy Lebid	Ukraine	7:55.62	
6	Ovidiu Olteanu	Romania	7:56.09	
7	Massimo Pegoretti	Italy	7:56.27	
8	Bouabdellah Tahri	France	7:59.17	
9	Panagiotis Papoulias	Greece	8:01.14	
10	Éric Dubus	France	8:02.36	
11	Halez Taguelmint	France	8:02.99	
12	Hristos Papapetrou	Cyprus	8:13.98	
