= 1996 European Athletics Indoor Championships – Men's 3000 metres =

The men's 3000 metres event at the 1996 European Athletics Indoor Championships was held in Stockholm Globe Arena on 8–9 March.

== Results ==
Rank	Name	Nationality	Time	Notes
1st place, gold medalist(s)	Anacleto Jiménez	Spain	7:50.06	
2nd place, silver medalist(s)	Christophe Impens	Belgium	7:50.19	
3rd place, bronze medalist(s)	Panagiotis Papoulias	Greece	7:50.80	
4	Ovidiu Olteanu	Romania	7:50.94	
5	Éric Dubus	France	7:53.53	
6	Alberto García	Spain	7:54.57	
7	Kent Claesson	Sweden	7:56.52	
8	Atiq Naaji	France	7:57.42	
9	Cândido Maia	Portugal	7:59.72	
