= 1998 European Athletics Indoor Championships – Men's 1500 metres =

The men's 1500 metres event at the 1998 European Athletics Indoor Championships was held on 27–28 February.

== Medalists ==
Gold	Silver	Bronze
Rui Silva; Portugal	Kader Chékhémani; France	Andrey Zadorozhniy; Russia

== Results ==
=== Heats ===
First 3 from each heat (Q) and the next 3 fastest (q) qualified for the final.

Rank	Heat	Name	Nationality	Time	Notes
1	2	José Antonio Redolat	Spain	3:39.56	Q
2	2	Andrey Zadorozhniy	Russia	3:40.15	Q
3	2	Kader Chékhémani	France	3:40.40	Q
4	2	Leszek Zblewski	Poland	3:40.83	q
5	2	Branko Zorko	Croatia	3:42.59	q
6	2	António Travassos	Portugal	3:43.37	q
7	1	Andrés Manuel Díaz	Spain	3:43.40	Q
8	1	Rui Silva	Portugal	3:43.92	Q
9	1	Giuseppe D'Urso	Italy	3:44.00	Q
10	1	Alexandru Vasile	Romania	3:44.34	
11	1	Jörgen Zaki	Sweden	3:45.12	
12	1	Juan Carlos Esteso	Spain	3:45.89	
13	1	Johan de Koning	Netherlands	3:46.57	

=== Final ===
Rank	Name	Nationality	Time	Notes
1st place, gold medalist(s)	Rui Silva	Portugal	3:44.57	
2nd place, silver medalist(s)	Kader Chékhémani	France	3:44.89	
3rd place, bronze medalist(s)	Andrey Zadorozhniy	Russia	3:44.93	
4	Andrés Manuel Díaz	Spain	3:45.18	
5	Leszek Zblewski	Poland	3:45.67	
6	Branko Zorko	Croatia	3:45.83	
7	António Travassos	Portugal	3:46.00	
8	José Antonio Redolat	Spain	3:48.74	
9	Giuseppe D'Urso	Italy	3:53.48	
