= Cândido Maia =

Portuguese middle-distance runner

Cândido Maia (born 8 February 1969) is a retired Portuguese athlete who specialised in the middle-distance events. He represented his country at three World Indoor Championships.

After a stint at FC Porto from 1987 to 1992 and 1995 to 2001, he joined his Maia Athletic Club, forming a team to compete in national cross country championships. He was considered a rival to Rui Silva following his 2001 World Indoor Championships win in the 1500 m, with Silva breaking Maia's 3000 m record.

== Competition record ==
Year	Competition	Venue	Position	Event	Notes
Representing Portugal
1988	World Junior Championships	Sudbury, Canada	13th	5000 m	14:44.83
1990	European Indoor Championships	Glasgow, United Kingdom	–	3000 m	DQ
1992	European Indoor Championships	Genoa, Italy	–	1500 m	DNF
1992	European Indoor Championships	Genoa, Italy	8th	3000 m	7:56.32
1993	World Indoor Championships	Toronto, Canada	10th (h)	3000 m	7:54.11
1994	European Indoor Championships	Paris, France	13th (h)	1500 m	3:46.69
1994	European Indoor Championships	Paris, France	14th (h)	3000 m	8:00.82
1995	World Indoor Championships	Barcelona, Spain	14th (h)	3000 m	8:00.79
1996	European Indoor Championships	Stockholm, Sweden	9th	3000 m	7:59.72
1997	World Indoor Championships	Paris, France	25th (h)	3000 m	8:06.58 Participou no 26º Campeonato Mundial de Corta-Mato foi realizado em 21 e 22 de março de 1998, em Marrakech, Marrocos

== Personal bests ==
Outdoor

- 1500 metres – 3:45.90 (Lisbon 1998)
- 5000 metres – 13:43.22 (Pontevedra 1993)
- 3000 metres steeplechase – 8:35.62 (Maia 1996)
- 10 kilometres – 30:33 (Amora 2001)

Indoor

- 1500 metres – 3:46.69 (Paris 1994)
- 3000 metres – 7:53.58 (Genoa 1992)
