= Mayock =

Mayock is a surname. Notable people with the surname include:

- John Mayock (born 1970), English middle-distance runner
- Mike Mayock (born 1958), American football executive and player
