= 1995 IAAF World Indoor Championships – Men's 3000 metres =

The men's 3000 metres event at the 1995 IAAF World Indoor Championships was held on 10–12 March.

== Medalists ==
Gold	Silver	Bronze
Gennaro Di Napoli; Italy	Anacleto Jiménez; Spain	Brahim Jabbour; Morocco

== Results ==
=== Heats ===
First 4 of each heat (Q) and next 4 fastest (q) qualified for the final.

Rank	Heat	Name	Nationality	Time	Notes
1	1	Gennaro Di Napoli	Italy	7:56.47	Q
2	1	Ovidiu Olteanu	Romania	7:56.75	Q
3	1	Mohamed Suleiman	Qatar	7:56.78	Q
4	1	Anacleto Jiménez	Spain	7:56.94	Q
5	1	Brahim Jabbour	Morocco	7:57.32	q
6	2	Shaun Creighton	Australia	7:57.35	Q
7	2	John Mayock	Great Britain	7:57.35	Q
8	2	Frank O'Mara	Ireland	7:58.11	Q
9	2	Isaac Viciosa	Spain	7:58.11	Q
10	1	Reuben Reina	United States	7:58.28	q
11	1	Réda Benzine	Algeria	7:58.50	q
12	2	Mohamed Belabbes	Algeria	7:58.74	q
13	2	Jacky Carlier	France	7:59.42	
14	1	Cândido Maia	Portugal	8:00.79	
15	1	Ahmed Ibrahim Warsama	Qatar	8:03.06	
16	2	João N'Tyamba	Angola	8:03.93	
17	2	Ronnie Harris	United States	8:05.40	
18	1	Mahmoud Kalboussi	Tunisia	8:05.60	
19	1	Mirko Döring	Germany	8:05.98	
20	2	Sipho Dlamini	Swaziland	8:09.99	NR
21	2	Marcelo Cascabelo	Argentina	8:14.97	
	2	Phillimon Hanneck	Zimbabwe	DNS	

=== Final ===
Rank	Name	Nationality	Time	Notes
1st place, gold medalist(s)	Gennaro Di Napoli	Italy	7:50.89	
2nd place, silver medalist(s)	Anacleto Jiménez	Spain	7:50.98	
3rd place, bronze medalist(s)	Brahim Jabbour	Morocco	7:51.42	
4	Mohamed Suleiman	Qatar	7:51.73	
5	John Mayock	Great Britain	7:51.86	
6	Reuben Reina	United States	7:53.86	
7	Shaun Creighton	Australia	7:54.46	
8	Isaac Viciosa	Spain	8:01.00	
9	Ovidiu Olteanu	Romania	8:02.89	
10	Réda Benzine	Algeria	8:03.60	
11	Mohamed Belabbes	Algeria	8:05.73	
	Frank O'Mara	Ireland	DNS	
