= 1999 IAAF World Indoor Championships – Men's 1500 metres =

The men's 1500 metres event at the 1999 IAAF World Indoor Championships was held on March 6–7.

== Medalists ==
Gold	Silver	Bronze
Haile Gebrselassie; Ethiopia	Laban Rotich; Kenya	Andres Diaz; Spain

== Results ==
=== Heats ===
First 3 of each heat (Q) and next 3 fastest (q) qualified for the final.

Rank	Heat	Name	Nationality	Time	Notes
1	2	Haile Gebrselassie	Ethiopia	3:41.22	Q
2	2	Rui Silva	Portugal	3:41.30	Q
3	2	Laban Rotich	Kenya	3:41.32	Q
4	2	Eddie King	Great Britain	3:41.92	q
5	1	Ali Hakimi	Tunisia	3:42.46	Q
6	1	Adil Kaouch	Morocco	3:42.53	Q
6	2	Richard Boulet	United States	3:42.53	q
8	1	William Tanui	Kenya	3:42.54	Q
9	1	Andres Diaz	Spain	3:42.58	q
10	1	Dirk Heinze	Germany	3:42.80	
11	1	Hamish Christensen	New Zealand	3:42.80	
12	2	Andrey Zadorozhniy	Russia	3:43.04	
13	1	David Krummenacker	United States	3:44.29	
14	2	José Antonio Redolat	Spain	3:45.52	
15	1	Sheldon Monderoy	Trinidad and Tobago	3:47.36	
16	2	Kiyoharu Sato	Japan	3:49.26	
17	2	Alexis Sharangabo	Rwanda	3:49.81	
18	2	Chipako Chungu	Zambia	3:53.46	
	2	Sampa Dendup	Bhutan	DNF	
	1	Ali Saïdi-Sief	Algeria	DNS	
	1	Farhad Heidari	Iran	DNS	

=== Final ===
Rank	Name	Nationality	Time	Notes
1st place, gold medalist(s)	Haile Gebrselassie	Ethiopia	3:33.77	CR
2nd place, silver medalist(s)	Laban Rotich	Kenya	3:33.98	
3rd place, bronze medalist(s)	Andres Diaz	Spain	3:34.46	
4	William Tanui	Kenya	3:34.77	PB
5	Rui Silva	Portugal	3:34.99	NR
6	Ali Hakimi	Tunisia	3:37.88	SB
7	Adil Kaouch	Morocco	3:38.48	PB
8	Richard Boulet	United States	3:39.93	
9	Eddie King	Great Britain	3:46.59	
