= 2002 European Athletics Championships – Men's 1500 metres =

Men's 1500 metres at the European Athletics Championships

The men's 1500 metres at the 2002 European Athletics Championships were held at the Olympic Stadium on August 6–8.

== Medalists ==
Gold	Silver	Bronze
Mehdi Baala; France	Reyes Estévez; Spain	Rui Silva; Portugal

== Results ==
=== Heats ===
Qualification: First 4 of each heat (Q) and the next 3 fastest (q) qualified for the final.

Rank	Heat	Name	Nationality	Time	Notes
1	2	Reyes Estévez	Spain	3:40.47	Q
2	2	Rui Silva	Portugal	3:40.84	Q
3	2	Fouad Chouki	France	3:41.36	Q
4	2	Christian Obrist	Italy	3:41.63	Q
5	2	Michael East	Great Britain	3:41.82	q
6	2	John Mayock	Great Britain	3:42.63	q
7	2	Juan Carlos Higuero	Spain	3:42.82	q
8	2	Lorenzo Perrone	Italy	3:43.02	q
9	2	Peter Philipp	Switzerland	3:44.30	
10	2	Matthias Norling	Sweden	3:45.28	
11	1	Mehdi Baala	France	3:46.71	Q
12	1	José Antonio Redolat	Spain	3:46.94	Q
13	1	Marko Koers	Netherlands	3:47.16	Q
14	1	Anthony Whiteman	Great Britain	3:47.40	Q
15	1	Luís Feiteira	Portugal	3:47.66	
16	1	Ivan Heshko	Ukraine	3:47.76	
17	1	Panagiotis Stroubakos	Greece	3:47.94	
18	1	James Nolan	Ireland	3:48.48	
19	1	Franek Haschke	Germany	3:48.56	
20	1	Lorenzo Lazzari	Italy	3:49.06	
21	1	Aleš Tomič	Slovenia	3:50.19	

=== Final ===
Rank	Name	Nationality	Time	Notes
1st place, gold medalist(s)	Mehdi Baala	France	3:45.25	
2nd place, silver medalist(s)	Reyes Estévez	Spain	3:45.25	
3rd place, bronze medalist(s)	Rui Silva	Portugal	3:45.43	
4	Fouad Chouki	France	3:45.46	
5	Juan Carlos Higuero	Spain	3:45.81	
6	Michael East	Great Britain	3:46.30	
7	Christian Obrist	Italy	3:46.57	
8	Marko Koers	Netherlands	3:46.68	
9	Anthony Whiteman	Great Britain	3:47.10	
10	Lorenzo Perrone	Italy	3:47.43	
11	José Antonio Redolat	Spain	3:48.28	
12	John Mayock	Great Britain	3:48.41	
