= 1992 European Athletics Indoor Championships – Men's 3000 metres =

The men's 3000 metres event at the 1992 European Athletics Indoor Championships was held in Palasport di Genova on 28 February and 1 March.

== Medalists ==
Gold	Silver	Bronze
Gennaro Di Napoli; Italy	John Mayock; Great Britain	José Luís González; Spain

== Results ==
=== Heats ===
First 3 from each heat (Q) and the next 4 fastest (q) qualified for the final.

Rank	Heat	Name	Nationality	Time	Notes
1	2	José Luís González	Spain	7:52.87	Q
2	2	John Mayock	Great Britain	7:53.11	Q
3	2	Stefano Mei	Italy	7:53.29	Q
4	2	Cândido Maia	Portugal	7:53.58	q
5	1	Gennaro Di Napoli	Italy	7:54.36	Q
6	1	Víctor Rojas	Spain	7:54.54	Q
7	1	Anacleto Jiménez	Spain	7:54.68	Q
8	1	Éric Dubus	France	7:54.80	q
9	2	Yves Brenier	France	7:55.19	q
10	1	Alessandro Lambruschini	Italy	7:55.65	q
11	1	Zeki Öztürk	Turkey	7:58.33	
12	2	Kai Jenkel	Switzerland	7:58.58	
13	1	Michael Buchleitner	Austria	7:58.79	
14	1	António Monteiro	Portugal	8:01.73	
15	2	Spyros Christopoulos	Greece	8:18.11	

=== Final ===
Rank	Name	Nationality	Time	Notes
1st place, gold medalist(s)	Gennaro Di Napoli	Italy	7:47.24	
2nd place, silver medalist(s)	John Mayock	Great Britain	7:48.47	
3rd place, bronze medalist(s)	José Luís González	Spain	7:48.82	
4	Éric Dubus	France	7:49.40	
5	Víctor Rojas	Spain	7:50.04	
6	Alessandro Lambruschini	Italy	7:50.05	
7	Stefano Mei	Italy	7:51.42	
8	Anacleto Jiménez	Spain	7:52.38	
9	Cândido Maia	Portugal	7:56.32	
	Yves Brenier	France	DNF	
