= José Antonio Redolat =

Spanish middle-distance runner

José Antonio Redolat (born 17 February 1976 in Campanar) is a Spanish runner who specializes in the 1500 metres.

== Competition record ==
Year	Competition	Venue	Position	Event	Notes
Representing Spain
1995	European Junior Championships	Nyíregyháza, Hungary	2nd	1500 m	3:46.70
1997	European U23 Championships	Turku, Finland	20th (h)	800 m	1:52.97
1997	Mediterranean Games	Bari, Italy	7th	800 m	1:48.49
1998	European Indoor Championships	Valencia, Spain	8th	1500 m	3:48.74
1998	Ibero-American Championships	Lisbon, Portugal	–	1500 m	DNF
1998	European Championships	Budapest, Hungary	32nd (h)	800 m	1:49.86
1999	World Indoor Championships	Maebashi, Japan	14th (h)	1500 m	3:45.52
2000	European Indoor Championships	Ghent, Belgium	1st	1500 m	3:40.51
2000	Olympic Games	Ghent, Belgium	22nd (sf)	1500 m	3:45.46
2001	World Championships	Edmonton, Canada	6th	1500 m	3:34.29
2002	European Championships	Munich, Germany	11th	1500 m	3:48.28
2004	World Indoor Championships	Budapest, Hungary	7th	1500 m	3:56.55
2007	European Indoor Championships	Birmingham, United Kingdom	–	3000 m	DNF

=== Personal bests ===
- 800 metres - 1:45.39 min (2000)
- 1500 metres - 3:31.21 min (2001)
- One mile - 3:49.60 min (2001)
- 3000 metres - 7:46.0 min (2003)
- 5000 metres - 13:23.14 min (2008)
