= Ovidiu Olteanu =

Romanian middle-distance runner

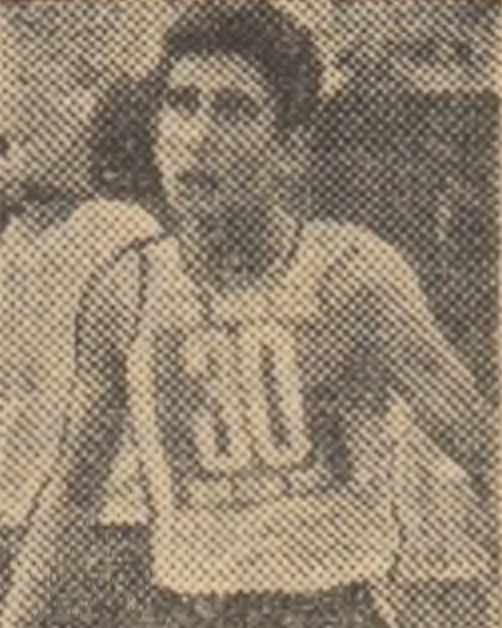
- Olteanu in 1986

Personal information
- Born: 6 August 1970 (age 55)
- Height: 1.83 m (6 ft 0 in)
- Weight: 72 kg (159 lb)

Sport
- Sport: Track and field
- Events: 1500 metres, 3000 metres

Ovidiu Olteanu (born 6 August 1970) is a retired Romanian athlete who competed in middle-distance events. He represented his country at the 1996 Summer Olympics, as well as two outdoor and two indoor World Championships. His biggest success was the silver medal in the 3000 metres at the 1994 European Indoor Championships.

== Competition record ==
Year	Competition	Venue	Position	Event	Notes
Representing Romania
1993	World Indoor Championships	Toronto, Canada	9th (h)	3000 m	7:53.17
1993	World Championships	Stuttgart, Germany	33rd (h)	1500 m	3:47.62
1993	World Championships	Stuttgart, Germany	–	5000 m	DNF
1994	European Indoor Championships	Paris, France	2nd	3000 m	7:52.37
1995	World Indoor Championships	Barcelona, Spain	9th	3000 m	8:02.89
1995	World Championships	Gothenburg, Sweden	20th (h)	1500 m	3:43.20
1996	European Indoor Championships	Stockholm, Sweden	4th	3000 m	7:50.94
1996	Olympic Games	Atlanta, United States	18th (h)	1500 m	3:38.33
1997	Jeux de la Francophonie	Antananarivo, Madagascar	1st	1500 m	3:45.37
1998	European Indoor Championships	Valencia, Spain	6th	3000 m	7:56.09
2000	European Indoor Championships	Ghent, Belgium	15th (h)	3000 m	8:04.67

== Personal bests ==
Outdoor

- 1500 metres – 3:38.33 (Atlanta 1996)
- One mile – 3:58.18 (Bucharest 1994)
- 3000 metres – 7:53.83 (Zagreb 1995)
- 5000 metres – 13:33.80 (Bucharest 1994)

Indoor

- 1500 metres – 3:44.89 (Moscow 1996)
- 3000 metres – 7:48.47 (Budapest 1998) NR
