= Konstantinos Poulios =

Greek long-distance runner

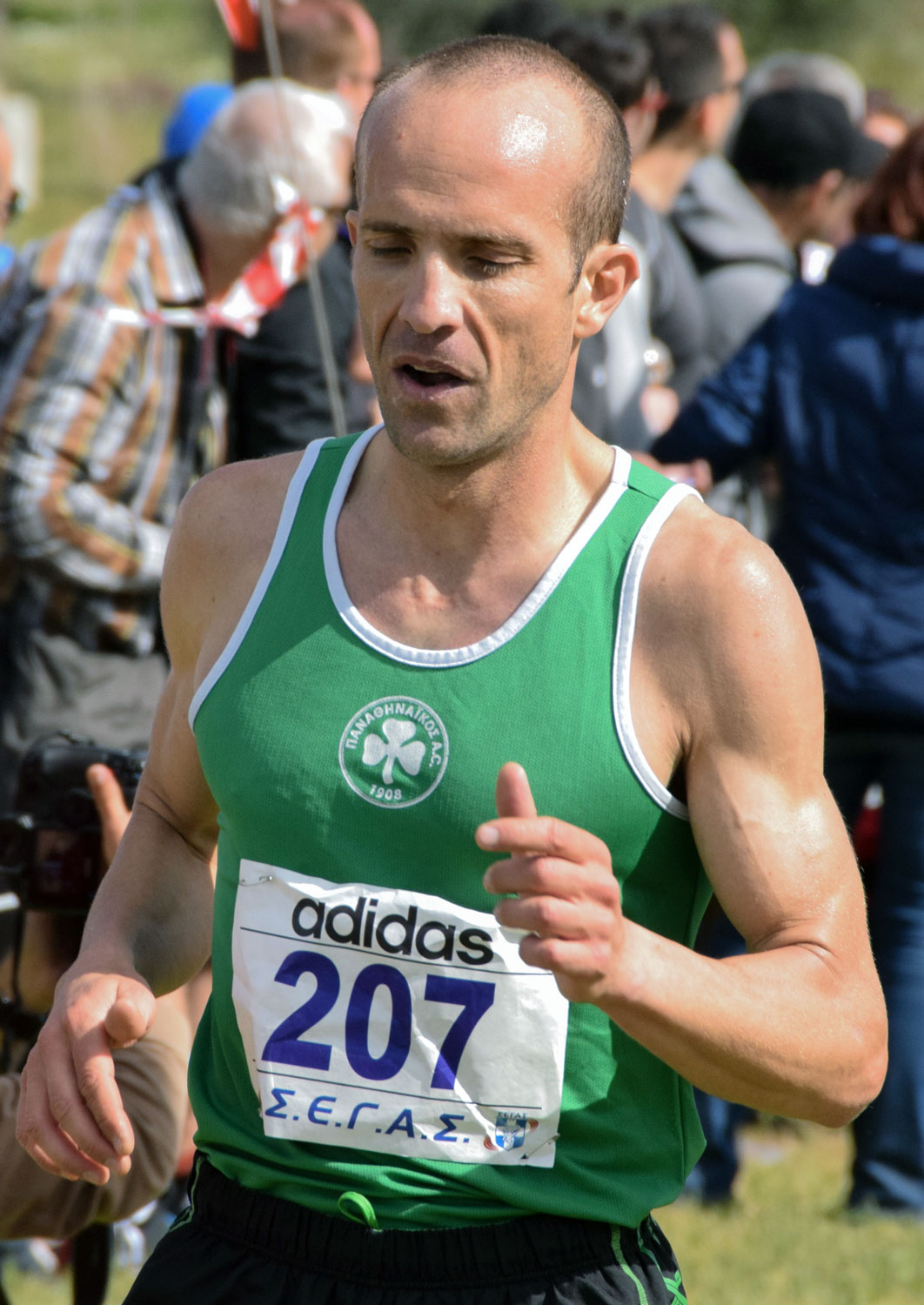

Personal information
- Born: September 16, 1977 (age 48) Athens
- Education: Department of Physical Education and Sport Science, National and Kapodistrian University of Athens
- Height: 1.75 m (5 ft 9 in)
- Weight: 60 kg (130 lb)

Sport
- Country: Greece
- Sport: Long-distance running
- Events: 1500 metres, 3000 metres, 5000 metres, 10,000 metres, half marathon, marathon
- Club: Panathinaikos

Achievements and titles
- Personal bests: 1500 metres: 3:54.11; 3000 metres: 8:23.03; 3000 metres ind.: 8:34.70; 5000 metres: 14:26.70; 10000 metres: 29:51.24; Half Marathon: 1:05:45; Marathon: 2:17:12

Konstantinos Poulios (born 19 September 1977) is a Greek long-distance runner. He was born in Athens and originates from Trikala. He competed in the marathon at the 2012 Summer Olympics in London, finishing in the 80th place with 2:33:17.

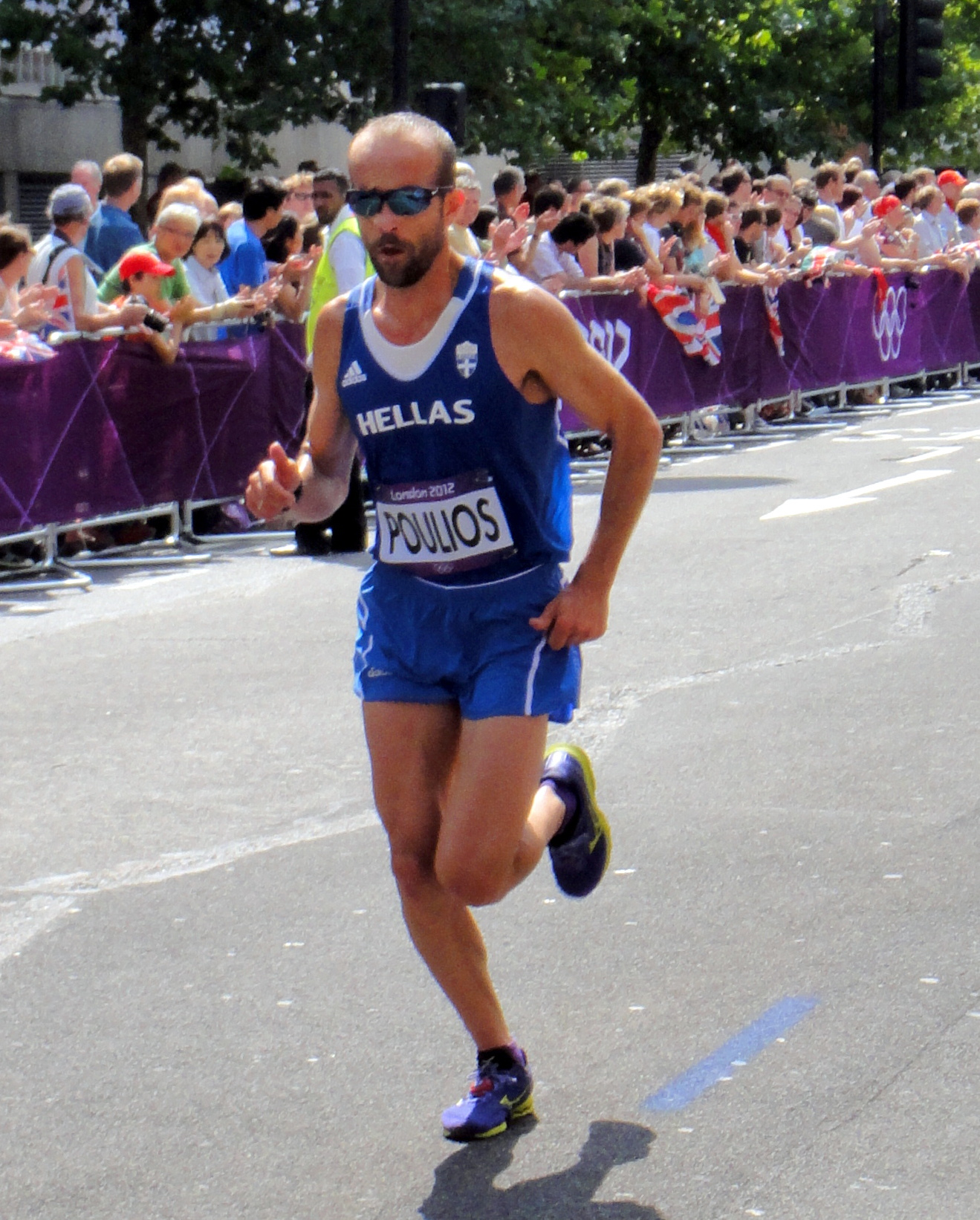
Konstantinos Poulios in the marathon at the 2012 Olympics in London
