= 1993 IAAF World Indoor Championships – Men's 3000 metres =

The men's 3000 metres event at the 1993 IAAF World Indoor Championships was held on 12 and 14 March.

== Medalists ==
Gold	Silver	Bronze
Gennaro Di Napoli; Italy	Éric Dubus; France	Enrique Molina; Spain

== Results ==
=== Heats ===
First 2 of each heat (Q) and next 4 fastest (q) qualified for the final.

Rank	Heat	Name	Nationality	Time	Notes
1	2	Gennaro Di Napoli	Italy	7:50.69	Q
2	2	Brendan Matthias	Canada	7:50.90	Q, NR
3	3	Frank O'Mara	Ireland	7:51.12	Q
4	2	Éric Dubus	France	7:51.22	Q
5	3	Joe Falcon	United States	7:51.42	Q
5	3	Enrique Molina	Spain	7:51.84	q
6	3	Mirko Döring	Germany	7:52.56	q
7	2	Mogens Guldberg	Denmark	7:52.99	q
8	3	Ovidiu Olteanu	Romania	7:53.17	NR
9	3	Peter O'Donoghue	Australia	7:53.86	NR
10	2	Cândido Maia	Portugal	7:54.11	
11	1	John Mayock	Great Britain	7:54.13	Q
12	1	Bob Kennedy	United States	7:54.28	Q
13	1	Víctor Rojas	Spain	7:54.32	
14	1	Phillip Clode	New Zealand	7:54.82	
15	2	Claes Nyberg	Sweden	7:56.03	
15	1	Christophe Impens	Belgium	7:56.07	
16	3	Marc Olesen	Canada	7:56.14	
17	1	Steve Agar	Dominica	7:56.44	NR
18	2	Abdelaziz Sahere	Morocco	7:59.62	
19	1	Yves Brenier	France	8:00.65	
20	2	Paul Donovan	Ireland	8:03.69	
21	3	Michael Chesire	Kenya	8:07.78	
	1	Josephat Kapkory	Kenya	DNS	

=== Final ===
Rank	Name	Nationality	Time	Notes
1st place, gold medalist(s)	Gennaro Di Napoli	Italy	7:50.26	
2nd place, silver medalist(s)	Éric Dubus	France	7:50.57	
3rd place, bronze medalist(s)	Enrique Molina	Spain	7:51.10	
4	Bob Kennedy	United States	7:51.27	
5	Mogens Guldberg	Denmark	7:52.60	
6	John Mayock	Great Britain	7:54.41	
7	Brendan Matthias	Canada	7:55.57	
8	Mirko Döring	Germany	7:59.42	
9	Joe Falcon	United States	8:01.94	
10	Frank O'Mara	Ireland	8:12.71	
