= Lorenzo Perrone (athlete) =

Italian middle-distance runner

Personal information
- National team: Italy (9 caps from 2001 to 2007)
- Born: 26 September 1981 (age 44) Palermo, Italy

Sport
- Country: Italy
- Sport: Athletics
- Event: Middle-distance running
- Club: G.S. Fiamme Gialle

Achievements and titles
- Personal bests: 800 m: 1:48.5; 1000 m: 2:19.7 (2004); 1500 m: 3:38.52 (2001); Mile: 4:01.26 (2005); 800 m indoor: 1:54.38 (2004); 1500 m indoor: 3:47.12 (2003); 3000 m indoor: 7:50.44 (2003)
Medal record
European Athletics Indoor Cup
| Bronze medal – third place | 2003 Leipzig | 3000 m |
European U23 Championships
| Bronze medal – third place | 2003 Bydgoszcz | 1500 m |

Lorenzo Perrone (born 26 September 1981) is a former Italian male middle-distance runner who won two national titles at senior level and that in 2003 ranking in 24th place at the end of season in the World list of the 3000 metres indoor, thanks to this good performance he participated at the 2003 IAAF World Indoor Championships.

== Biography ==
He was 10th at the 2002 European Athletics Championships in Munich in the final of the 1500 metres. He also participated at two editions of the IAAF World Cross Country Championships (2001, 2004) at individual senior level.

== Achievements ==
| Year | Competition | Venue | Position | Event | Time | Notes |
|---|---|---|---|---|---|---|
| 2001 | Mediterranean Games | (Tunisia) Radès | 7th | 1500 m | 3:51.60 | |
| 2002 | European Championships | (Germany) Munich | 10th | 1500 m | 3:47.43 | |
| 2003 | World Indoor Championships | (United Kingdom) Birmingham | 17th | 3000 m | 8:04.00 | |

== National titles ==
He won two national championships at individual senior level.

- Italian Indoor Athletics Championships
  - 3000 metres: 2003
- Italian Cross Country Championships
  - Short race: 2001
