= 1994 European Athletics Indoor Championships – Men's 3000 metres =

The men's 3000 metres event at the 1994 European Athletics Indoor Championships was held in Palais Omnisports de Paris-Bercy on 11 and 13 March.

== Medalists ==
Gold	Silver	Bronze
Kim Bauermeister; Germany	Ovidiu Olteanu; Romania	Rod Finch; Great Britain

== Results ==
=== Heats ===
First 3 from each heat (Q) and the next 6 fastest (q) qualified for the final.

Rank	Heat	Name	Nationality	Time	Notes
1	2	Rod Finch	Great Britain	7:57.35	Q
2	2	Mário Silva	Portugal	7:57.45	Q
3	2	Kim Bauermeister	Germany	7:57.76	Q
4	2	Michael Buchleitner	Austria	7:57.77	q
5	2	Andrés Miguel Martínez	Spain	7:57.98	q
6	2	Enrique Molina	Spain	7:58.16	q
7	2	Mogens Guldberg	Denmark	7:58.53	q
8	2	Gino Van Geyte	Belgium	7:58.54	q
9	1	Ovidiu Olteanu	Romania	7:59.83	Q
10	1	Mirko Döring	Germany	8:00.19	Q
11	1	Andrey Tikhonov	Russia	8:00.30	Q
12	1	Anacleto Jiménez	Spain	8:00.47	q
13	1	Christophe Impens	Belgium	8:00.59	
14	1	Cândido Maia	Portugal	8:00.82	
15	1	Marcel Laros	Netherlands	8:01.04	
16	2	Nadir Bosch	France	8:01.57	
17	1	Claes Nyberg	Sweden	8:03.08	
18	1	Matt Barnes	Great Britain	8:10.88	
19	2	Éric Dubus	France	8:12.15	
20	1	Ljubiša Đokić	Yugoslavia	8:13.81	
21	1	Pascal Thiébaut	France	8:18.55	
22	2	Bekim Bahtiri	Slovenia	8:21.60	

=== Final ===
Rank	Name	Nationality	Time	Notes
1st place, gold medalist(s)	Kim Bauermeister	Germany	7:52.34	
2nd place, silver medalist(s)	Ovidiu Olteanu	Romania	7:52.37	
3rd place, bronze medalist(s)	Rod Finch	Great Britain	7:53.99	
4	Anacleto Jiménez	Spain	7:55.78	
5	Michael Buchleitner	Austria	7:56.47	
6	Andrés Miguel Martínez	Spain	7:59.70	
7	Andrey Tikhonov	Russia	8:02.95	
8	Gino Van Geyte	Belgium	8:11.02	
9	Mirko Döring	Germany	8:50.58	
	Enrique Molina	Spain	DNF	
	Mário Silva	Portugal	DNF	
	Mogens Guldberg	Denmark	DQ	
