= 1996 World Junior Championships in Athletics – Men's 1500 metres =

The men's 1500 metres event at the 1996 World Junior Championships in Athletics was held in Sydney, Australia, at International Athletic Centre on 23, 24 and 25 August.

== Medalists ==
Gold	Shadrack Lagat; Kenya
Silver	Mohamed Yagoub; Sudan
Bronze	Miloud Abaoub; Algeria

== Results ==
=== Final ===
25 August

Rank	Name	Nationality	Time	Notes
1st place, gold medalist(s)	Shadrack Lagat	Kenya	3:38.96	
2nd place, silver medalist(s)	Mohamed Yagoub	Sudan	3:39.17	
3rd place, bronze medalist(s)	Miloud Abaoub	Algeria	3:39.37	
4	Gert-Jan Liefers	Netherlands	3:40.47	
5	Grigoriy Generalov	Russia	3:40.82	
6	Rui Silva	Portugal	3:41.81	
7	Ali Saïdi-Sief	Algeria	3:42.12	
8	Noah Ngeny	Kenya	3:42.44	
9	Dalibor Balgač	Croatia	3:44.62	
10	Hudson de Souza	Brazil	3:45.22	
11	Nasser Suleiman	Qatar	3:49.28	
	Ivan Manjon	Spain	DNF	

=== Semifinals ===
24 August

==== Semifinal 1 ====
Rank	Name	Nationality	Time	Notes
1	Miloud Abaoub	Algeria	3:42.53	Q
2	Rui Silva	Portugal	3:42.58	Q
3	Shadrack Lagat	Kenya	3:42.69	Q
4	Hudson de Souza	Brazil	3:42.79	Q
5	Dalibor Balgač	Croatia	3:42.86	Q
6	Mohamed Yagoub	Sudan	3:43.24	q
7	Nasser Suleiman	Qatar	3:43.88	q
8	Grzegorz Rogala	Poland	3:44.93	
9	Hideki Miyazaki	Japan	3:48.21	
10	Michael Stember	United States	3:50.62	
11	Andrew Walker	Ireland	4:00.07	
12	Francisco Navarro	Spain	4:02.89	

==== Semifinal 2 ====
Rank	Name	Nationality	Time	Notes
1	Noah Ngeny	Kenya	3:42.48	Q
2	Gert-Jan Liefers	Netherlands	3:43.75	Q
3	Ali Saïdi-Sief	Algeria	3:44.48	Q
4	Grigoriy Generalov	Russia	3:45.13	Q
5	Ivan Manjon	Spain	3:45.31	Q
6	Fouad Chouki	France	3:45.32	
7	Daniel Oniciuc	Romania	3:47.17	
8	Ales Tomic	Slovenia	3:47.25	
9	Grzegorz Kujawski	Poland	3:49.01	
10	Todd Humcke	United States	3:49.93	
11	Jay Cantin	Canada	3:50.05	
12	Darko Radomirović	Yugoslavia	4:01.70	

=== Heats ===
23 August

==== Heat 1 ====
Rank	Name	Nationality	Time	Notes
1	Hudson de Souza	Brazil	3:56.20	Q
2	Andrew Walker	Ireland	3:56.88	Q
3	Rui Silva	Portugal	3:56.90	Q
4	Francisco Navarro	Spain	3:56.92	Q
5	Grzegorz Rogala	Poland	3:56.94	Q
6	Abdelghani Lahlali	Morocco	3:57.09	
7	Hirohisa Muramatsu	Japan	3:57.82	
8	Tom Mayo	United Kingdom	4:01.35	
9	Meynard Luhanga	Malawi	4:15.08	
10	Mohamed Al-Bayed	Palestine	4:45.03	

==== Heat 2 ====
Rank	Name	Nationality	Time	Notes
1	Gert-Jan Liefers	Netherlands	3:49.42	Q
2	Ali Saïdi-Sief	Algeria	3:49.62	Q
3	Shadrack Lagat	Kenya	3:49.87	Q
4	Fouad Chouki	France	3:50.15	Q
5	Ales Tomic	Slovenia	3:50.22	Q
6	Michael Stember	United States	3:50.49	q
7	Grzegorz Kujawski	Poland	3:50.93	q
8	Reuben Silwimba	Zambia	3:54.89	
9	Mizan Mehari	Ethiopia	4:06.71	

==== Heat 3 ====
Rank	Name	Nationality	Time	Notes
1	Miloud Abaoub	Algeria	3:50.85	Q
2	Ivan Manjon	Spain	3:51.31	Q
3	Darko Radomirović	Yugoslavia	3:51.42	Q
4	Nasser Suleiman	Qatar	3:51.81	Q
5	Grigoriy Generalov	Russia	3:51.97	Q
6	Daniel Oniciuc	Romania	3:52.65	q
7	Grant Cuddy	United Kingdom	3:52.81	
8	Alexis Sharangabo	Rwanda	3:57.01	
9	Mehdi Baala	France	4:21.48	
10	Chris Votu	Solomon Islands	4:24.11	

==== Heat 4 ====
Rank	Name	Nationality	Time	Notes
1	Noah Ngeny	Kenya	3:46.70	Q
2	Mohamed Yagoub	Sudan	3:47.76	Q
3	Hideki Miyazaki	Japan	3:48.43	Q
4	Dalibor Balgač	Croatia	3:49.30	Q
5	Jay Cantin	Canada	3:50.25	Q
6	Todd Humcke	United States	3:50.40	q
7	Lionel Barranco	Turks and Caicos Islands	4:29.80	
8	David Dexter	Vanuatu	4:32.04	

== Participation ==
According to an unofficial count, 37 athletes from 29 countries participated in the event.

- Algeria (2)
- Brazil (1)
- Canada (1)
- Croatia (1)
- Ethiopia (1)
- France (2)
- Ireland (1)
- Japan (2)
- Kenya (2)
- Malawi (1)
- Morocco (1)
- Netherlands (1)
- Palestine (1)
- Poland (2)
- Portugal (1)
- Qatar (1)
- Romania (1)
- Russia (1)
- Rwanda (1)
- Slovenia (1)
- Solomon Islands (1)
- Spain (2)
- Sudan (1)
- Turks and Caicos Islands (1)
- United Kingdom (2)
- United States (2)
- Vanuatu (1)
- Yugoslavia (1)
- Zambia (1)
