= Athletics at the 1995 Summer Universiade – Men's 5000 metres =

The men's 5000 metres event at the 1995 Summer Universiade was held on 30–31 August at the Hakatanomori Athletic Stadium in Fukuoka, Japan.

== Medalists ==
Gold	Silver	Bronze
Katsuhiro Kawauchi; Japan	Brahim Boulami; Morocco	Maurizio Leone; Italy

== Results ==
=== Heats ===
Qualification: First 5 of each heat (Q) and the next 5 fastest (q) qualified for the final.

Rank	Heat	Athlete	Nationality	Time	Notes
1	1	Vener Kachayev	Russia	14:03.41	Q
2	1	John Mborothi	Kenya	14:05.80	Q
3	1	Sdjad-Hazave Hamid	Iran	14:07.66	Q
4	2	Sammy Nyamongo	Kenya	14:09.55	Q
5	1	Katsuhiro Kawauchi	Japan	14:09.60	Q
6	2	Maurizio Leone	Italy	14:10.07	Q
7	2	Brahim Boulami	Morocco	14:10.22	Q
8	1	Gabino Apolonio	Mexico	14:10.96	Q
9	2	Jan Pešava	Czech Republic	14:13.68	Q
10	1	Brian Baker	United States	14:16.15	q
11	2	Daisuke Isomatsu	Japan	14:17.50	Q
12	1	Fatih Çintimar	Turkey	14:16.15	q
13	2	Daniel Middleman	United States	14:16.62	q
14	2	Sergey Fedotov	Russia	14:29.41	q
15	1	Lesedinyana Lekgoa	Botswana	15:18.56	q
16	2	U Aye Lwin	Myanmar	15:19.29	
17	2	Ian Forsyth	Canada	15:35.27	
18	1	Giovanni Morejón	Bolivia	15:36.37	
19	2	Elsidig Ibraim	Sudan	15:41.35	
20	2	Shiraaz Haroon Shah	Fiji	15:45.18	
21	1	Cocou Gbaglo	Benin	15:53.13	
22	1	Nicodemus Nyamajeje	Tanzania	17:10.63	
23	2	Piseth Chheng	Cambodia	17:40.02	
	1	Ahmedou Mohamedjiddou	Mauritania	DNF	
	2	Juma Nkuwi	Tanzania	DNF	
	2	Panagiotis Papoulias	Greece	DNF	
	1	Adamou Aboubakar	Cameroon	DNS	
	1	Phil Costley	New Zealand	DNS	
	2	Dashpurev Munkhbayar	Mongolia	DNS	

=== Final ===
Rank	Athlete	Nationality	Time	Notes
1st place, gold medalist(s)	Katsuhiro Kawauchi	Japan	13:53.86	
2nd place, silver medalist(s)	Brahim Boulami	Morocco	13:54.05	
3rd place, bronze medalist(s)	Maurizio Leone	Italy	13:54.13	
4	John Mborothi	Kenya	13:54.18	
5	Sammy Nyamongo	Kenya	13:57.19	
6	Jan Pešava	Czech Republic	14:00.39	
7	Gabino Apolonio	Mexico	14:07.17	
8	Vener Kachayev	Russia	14:12.27	
9	Sdjad-Hazave Hamid	Iran	14:19.79	
10	Brian Baker	United States	14:21.82	
11	Sergey Fedotov	Russia	14:22.64	
12	Daisuke Isomatsu	Japan	14:27.16	
13	Daniel Middleman	United States	14:27.93	
14	Fatih Çintimar	Turkey	14:32.17	
	Lesedinyana Lekgoa	Botswana	DNF	
