= Anacleto Jiménez =

Spanish long-distance runner

Personal information
- Born: 24 February 1967 (age 59) Logroño, La Rioja, Spain

Sport
- Sport: Track and field
Medal record
Representing Spain
World Indoor Championships
Silver medal – second place	1995 Barcelona	5000m
Summer Universiade
Gold medal – first place	1987 Zagreb	3000m
European Indoor Championships
Gold medal – first place	1996 Stockholm	3000m

Anacleto Jiménez Pastor (born 24 February 1967) is a retired Spanish long-distance runner. He competed in the men's 5,000m at the 1996 Summer Olympics.

== Achievements ==
Year	Competition	Venue	Position	Event	Notes
Representing Spain
1986	World Junior Championships	Athens, Greece	7th	5000m	14:00.36
1987	Summer Universiade	Zagreb, Yugoslavia	1st	5000 m	14:08.15
1988	European Indoor Championships	Budapest, Hungary	7th	3000 m	7:59.25
1989	European Indoor Championships	The Hague, Netherlands	9th	3000 m	7:58.16
1991	World Indoor Championships	Seville, Spain	11th (h)	3000 m	7:51.67
1992	European Indoor Championships	Genoa, Italy	8th	3000 m	7:52.38
1992	Ibero-American Championships	Seville, Spain	2nd	5000m	13:55.35
1994	European Indoor Championships	Paris, France	4th	3000 m	7:55.78
1994	European Championships	Helsinki, Finland	8th	5000 m	13:41.60
1995	World Indoor Championships	Barcelona, Spain	2nd	3000 m	7:50.98
1996	European Indoor Championships	Stockholm, Sweden	1st	3000 m	7:50.06
1997	World Indoor Championships	Paris, France	9th	3000 m	7:52.55

== Personal bests ==
- 1500 metres - 3:34.47 min (1996)
- 3000 metres - 7:35.83 min (1998)
- 5000 metres - 13:08.30 min (1997)
- 10,000 metres - 28:27.98 min (1999)
