= Nadir Bosch =

French athletics competitor

Nadir Bosch (born 16 May 1973) is a retired French runner who specialized in the 1500 metres and the 3000 metres steeplechase.

He was born in Algiers. He finished twelfth in the 1500 metres at the 1997 World Championships and reached the final in the 3000 metres at the 2000 European Indoor Championships (did not start).

He also competed at the 1994 European Indoor Championships, the 1996 Olympic Games, the 1997 World Indoor Championships, the 1998 European Championships and the 1999 World Championships without reaching the final. He became French steeplechase champion in 1995 and 1996; and French indoor champion three times in three different events.

== Personal bests ==
- 800 metres: 1:48.68 (Cagnes 1998)
- 1000 metres: 2:15.51 (Nice 1999)
- 1500 metres: 3:32.06 (Paris 1999)
- Mile run: 3:52.04 (Brussels 2000)
- 3000 metres: 7:49.53 (indoor, Liévin 1997)
- 3000 metres steeplechase: 8:24.76 minutes (Evry-Bondoufle 1985)
