= Mohamed Khaldi =

Algerian long-distance runner

Medal record

Men's athletics

Representing Algeria

African Championships
Bronze medal – third place	2000 Algiers	1500 m

Mohamed Khaldi (born 5 March 1975 in Annaba) is an Algerian long-distance runner. He specializes in the distances from 1500 through 5000 metres. He competed in the 1500 metres at the 2000 Summer Olympics and the 2004 Summer Olympics.

== Achievements ==
Year	Competition	Venue	Position	Event	Notes
Representing Algeria
2000	African Championships	Algiers, Algeria	3rd	1500 m	3:42.77
2000	Olympic Games	Sydney, Australia	29th (h)	1500 m	3:41.16
2001	World Indoor Championships	Lisbon, Portugal	9th	3000 m	7:52.76
2001	World Championships	Paris, France	15th (sf)	1500 m	3:40.38
2001	Mediterranean Games	Radès, Tunisia	2nd	1500 m	3:47.55
2001	Mediterranean Games	Radès, Tunisia	1st	5000 m	14:06.30
2002	African Championships	Radès, Tunisia	7th	1500 m	3:43.46
2002	African Championships	Radès, Tunisia	9th	5000 m	13:52.33
2003	World Indoor Championships	Birmingham, United Kingdom	11th	3000 m	7:56.05
2004	Olympic Games	Athens, Greece	29th (h)	1500 m	3:42.47

=== Personal bests ===
- 1500 metres - 3:33.03 min (2001)
- 3000 metres - 7:38.78 min (2001)
- 5000 metres - 13:17.71 min (2002)
- 3000 metres steeplechase - 8:46.11 min (2004)
