= Rod Finch =

British former middle-distance runner

Medal record

Men's athletics

Representing Great Britain

European Indoor Championships
| Bronze medal – third place | 1994 Paris | 3000 m |

Rod Finch (born 5 August 1967) is a British former middle-distance runner who mainly competed in the 1500 metres, 3000 metres and the 5000 meters.

The peak of his career was a bronze medal for Great Britain over 3000 m at the 1994 European Athletics Indoor Championships, which he took even though he stumbled on the final lap. During his athletic career he continued to work as a sergeant for the 3rd Battalion, Parachute Regiment. This was his only major international medal.

Finch shared in the 3000 m national title at the 1998 AAA Indoor Championships with Dave Taylor. At regional level he was the 1993 South of England champion over 5000 metres and that same year was the 1500 m inter-counties champion.

He continued to compete into his later years with Basingstoke & Mid Hants Athletics Club.

== International competitions ==
| Year | Competition | Venue | Position | Event | Notes |
|---|---|---|---|---|---|
| 1994 | European Indoor Championships | Paris, France | 3rd | 3000 m | 7:53.99 |

== National titles ==
- AAA Indoor Championships
  - 3000 m: 1998
