= Mathieu Dubus =

Dutch painter

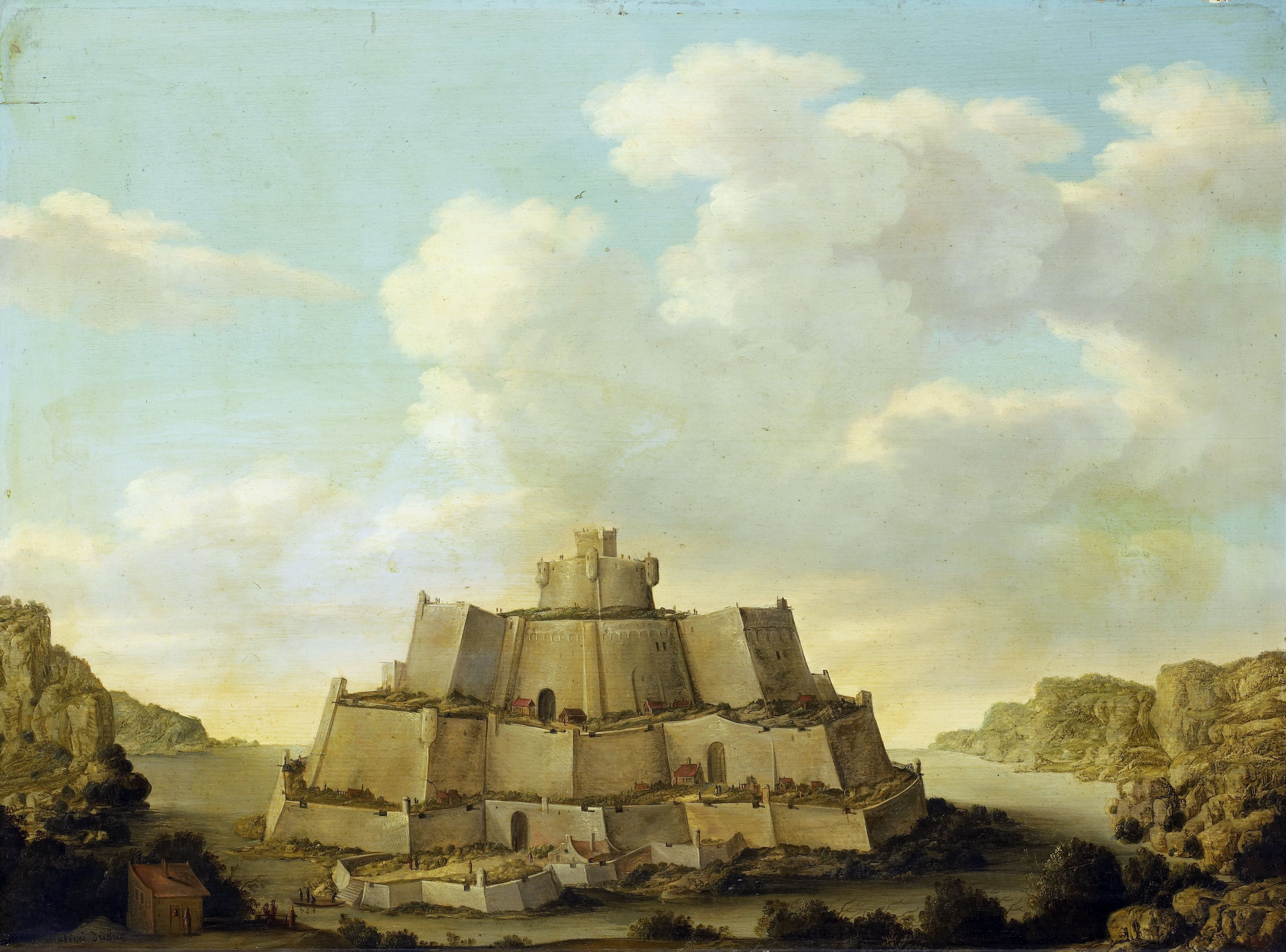
A fort

Mathieu Dubus (South Flanders, possibly in Ypres, c. 1590 – The Hague, between 11 June 1665 and 30 May 1666) was a Flemish-born decorative and landscape painter who was active in The Hague in the Dutch Republic. He painted fantastic landscapes with rocks and stark contrasts of light and dark, which appear modern and unlike those of his contemporaries.

== Life ==
Mathieu Dubus was born in the south of Flanders, possibly in Ypres. Nothing is known about how he ended up in the Dutch Republic or with whom he trained. The first record of Mathieu Dubus is the 1622 registration of his marriage to Margrieta Pannar in The Hague. That document states that he was born in the south of Flanders and was a painter by profession. A document of 1644 states that he was about 54 years old at the time. This places the time of his birth around 1590.

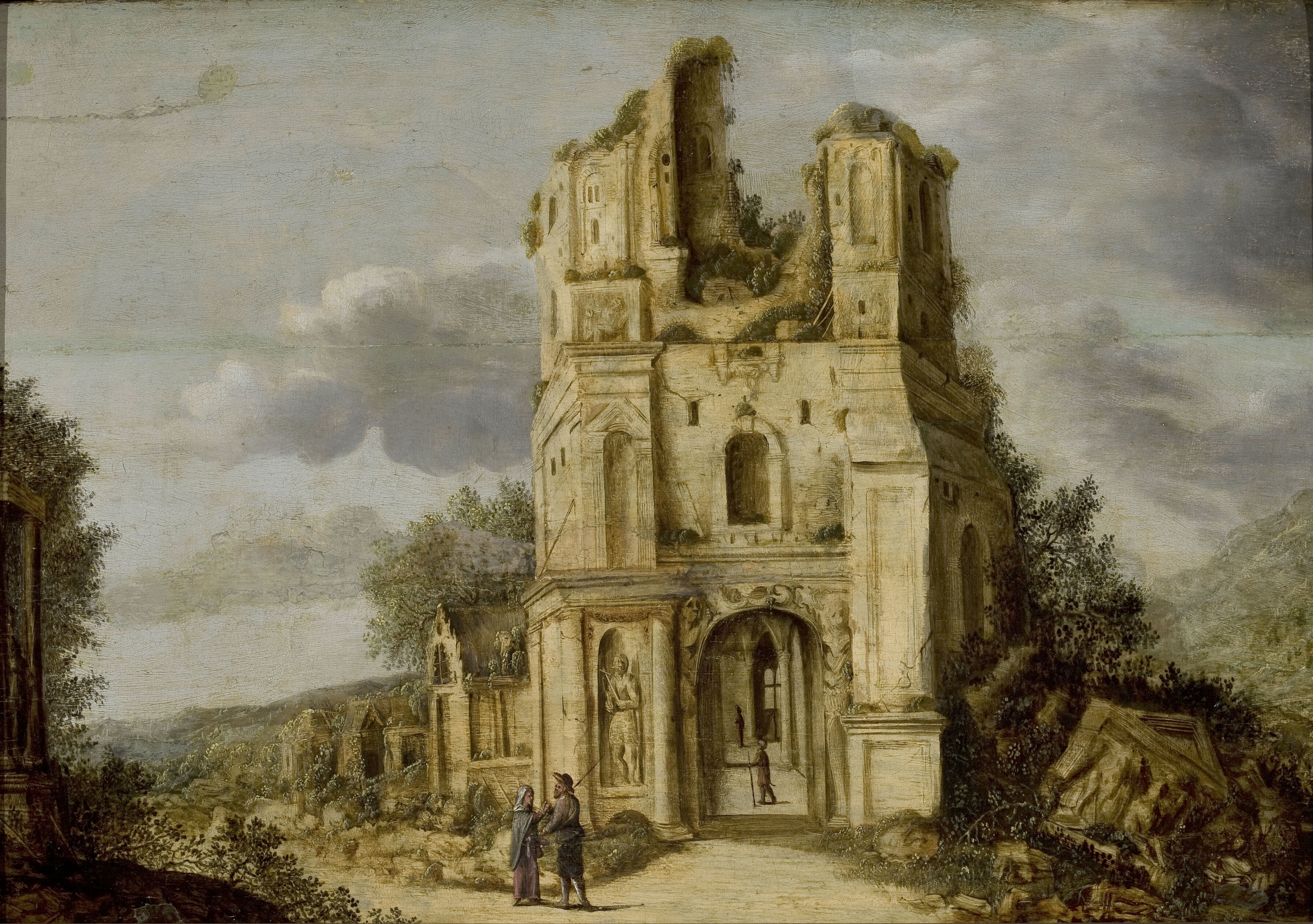
Ruins of a church

Where or with whom he trained is unknown. In 1626, he is mentioned as a painter to the Dutch stadholder, the Prince of Orange. He worked as a decorative painter at the palaces of the stadholder in The Hague. This included work on the ceiling of the Great Hall at Noordeinde Palace which he embellished with birds and on the galleries at Huis ter Nieuburg in Rijswijk and Buren Castle where he added gold-leaf foliage. He worked for more than twenty years as a decorative painter in the service of the stadholder's court.

He was also active as an independent artist and he became in 1635 a member of the St Luke’s Guild of The Hague. He was living on the Veerkade in The Hague. The artist married three times. His daughter Cornelia married on 26 July 1665 with the Antwerp painter Jan Baptist Tijssens the Elder, who at some time worked in The Hague. Another daughter called Maria married the decoration painter Bartholomeus van Winden while a third daughter married Bartholomeus' brother, the minor painter Gerardt van Winden.

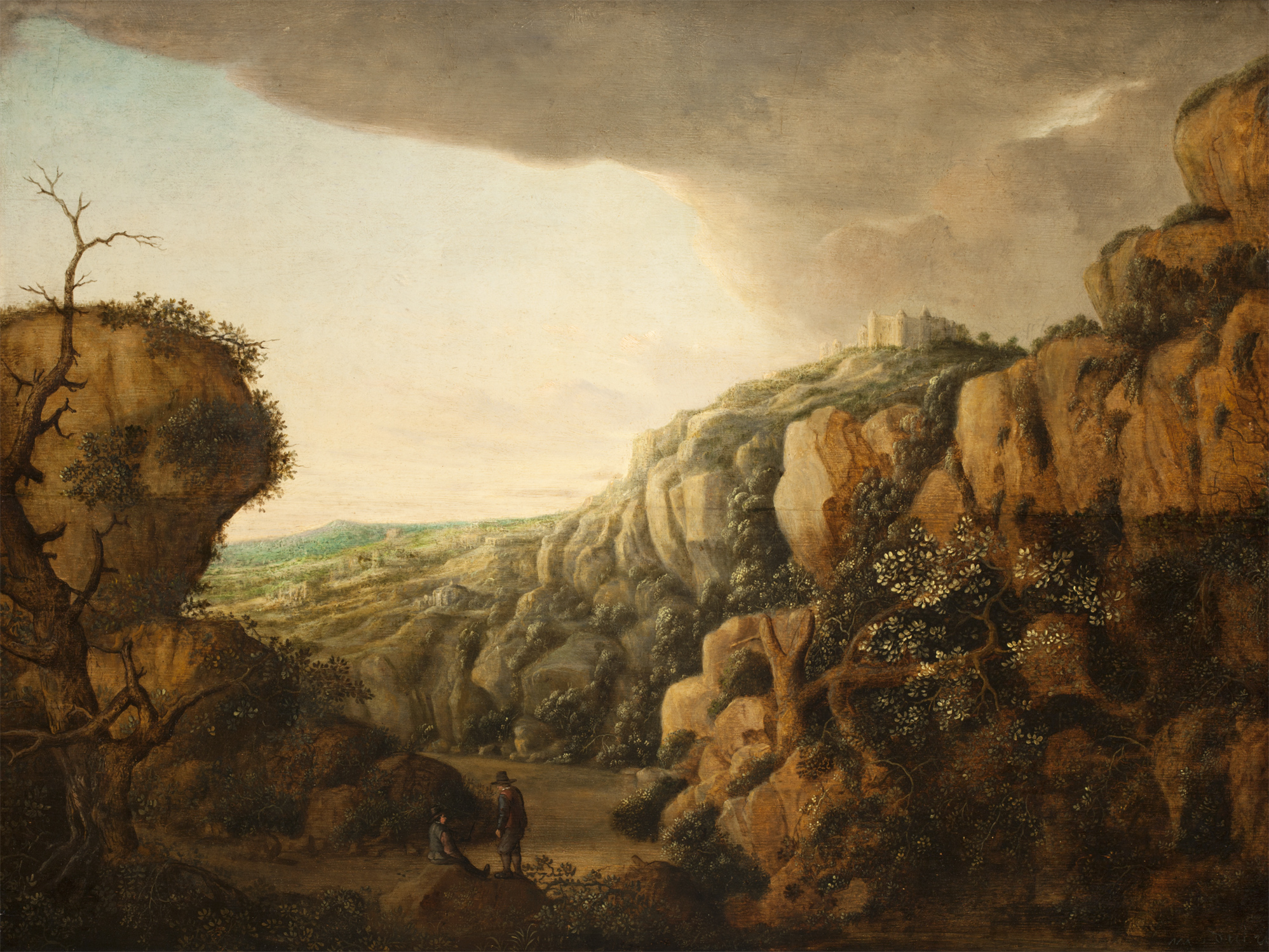
Mountainous landscape

Mathieu Dubus may have been the father or elder brother of Johan Baptist Dubus, a painter recorded working in The Hague in 1664.

The death date and place of Mathieu Dubus are not known but it is believed that he died in The Hague. The date of his death is placed between 11 June 1665 when he was stated in a document as being alive and 30 May 1666 when he is recorded as deceased.

== Work ==
Mathieu Dubus' known work is very limited. He painted fantastic landscapes in the Italianate style typically depicting rugged rocks. His compositions were enlivened by sharp contrasts of light and dark. The style of his paintings differed from that of contemporary landscape artists and is reminiscent of works in the Magic Realist style. He seems to have been influenced by the contemporary landscape painter Hercules Seghers. Seghers' works were in the collection of the stadtholder and it is possible that Dubus saw them there.

Dubus is recorded as having used stone as a medium for painting.

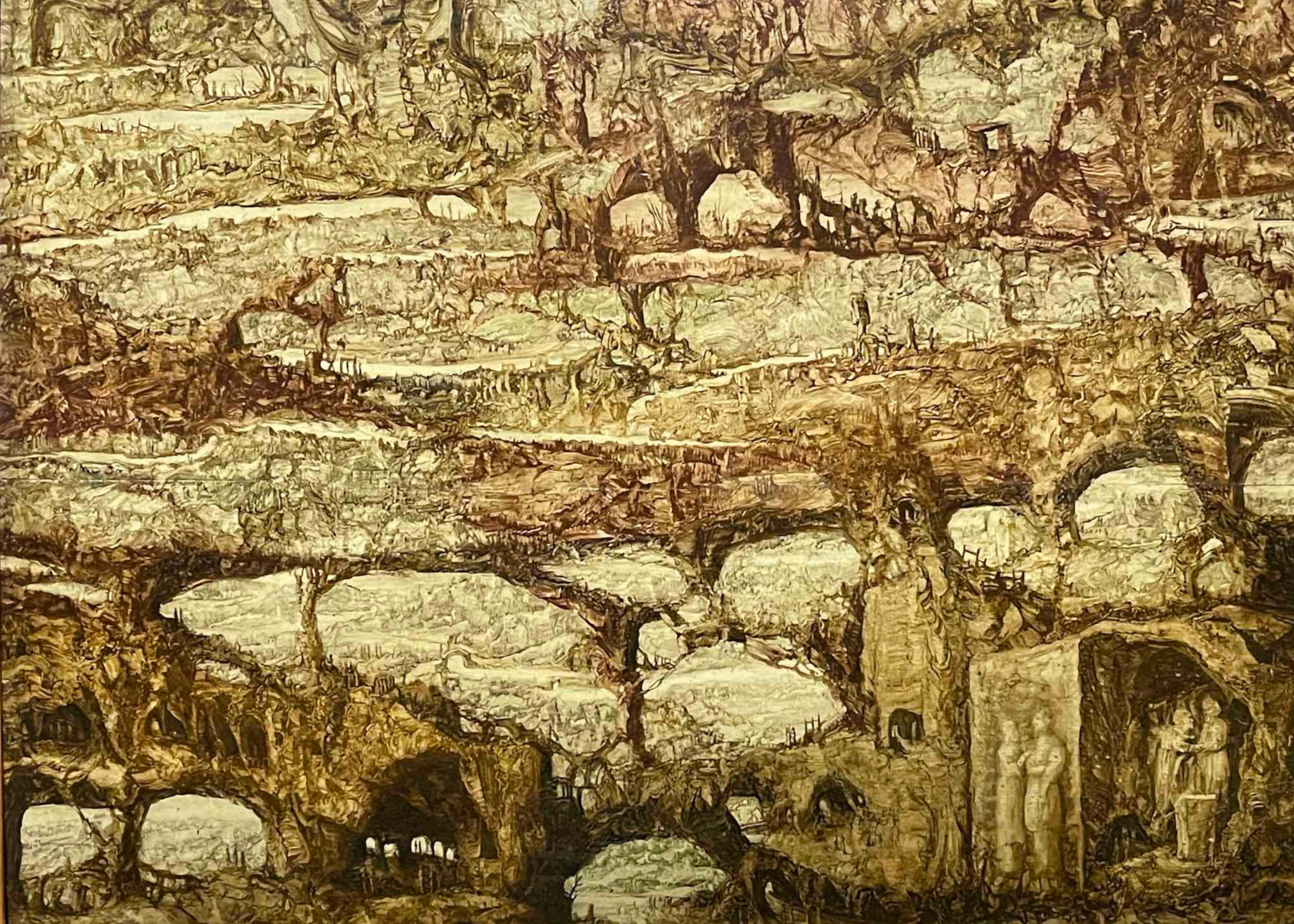
Destruction of Sodom and Gomorrah

In The Destruction of Sodom and Gomorrah Dubus took the biblical episode from Genesis 19,1-29, which he depicted in the right bottom corner hidden under brittle, tattered masonry, as an opportunity to lead the viewer around among various bizarre forms. His observational stance could be called impressionistic. In this work Dubus also simulated in the background a paesina, i.e. a marble stone which appears to depict a landscape. The artist thus imitated a piece of nature that imitated nature.
