= Panagiotis Papoulias =

Greek former track and field athlete (born 1969)

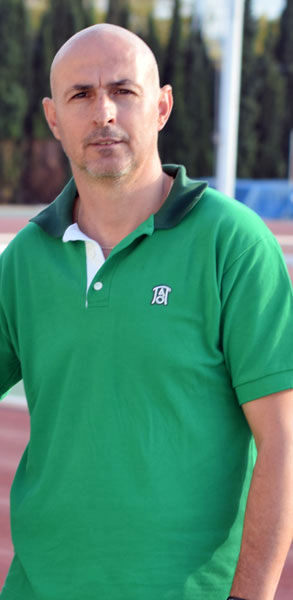

Personal information
- Nationality: Greek
- Born: December 9, 1969 (age 56) Athens
- Education: School of Physical Education and Sport Science, University of Athens
- Occupation: Athletics coach
- Height: 178 cm (5 ft 10 in)
- Weight: 62 kg (137 lb)

Sport
- Country: Greece
- Sport: Middle-distance running, Long-distance running
- Events: 1500 metres, 3000 metres, 5000 metres, 10000 metres
- Now coaching: Panathinaikos Athletics

Achievements and titles
- Personal bests: 1500 metres: 3:37.38 (1997); 1500 metres ind.: 3:39.63 (1998 Panh. record); 3000 metres: 7:44.26 (1996); 3000 metres ind.: 7:43.66 (1998 Panh. record); 3000 metres steeplechase: 8:28.62 (1999); 5000 metres: 13:28.59 (1995 current Panh. record); 10000 metres: 29:22.49 (2004 current Panh. record, M35 cat.)
Medal record
Representing Greece
Event	1st	2nd	3rd
European Indoor Championships	0	0	1
European Cup	0	0	2
Total	0	0	3
European Indoor Championships
Bronze medal – third place	1996 Stockholm	3000 m
European Cup
Bronze medal – third place	1997 Munich	3000 m
Bronze medal – third place	1997 Munich	5000 m
- Updated on 13 March 2017

Panagiotis Papoulias (Greek: Παναγιώτης Παπούλιας; born 9 December 1969) is a Greek former track and field athlete who competing middle- and long-distance running events. His greatest achievement was a bronze medal at the 1996 European Athletics Indoor Championships. He was a two-time participant at the World Championships in Athletics (1995 and 1997) and also ran at the 1998 IAAF World Cross Country Championships and 1998 European Athletics Championships.

Papoulias was a six-time national champion at the Greek Athletics Championships, winning two 1500 metres titles and four over 5000 metres. He is the Greek national record holder in the 3000 m and 5000 m events with personal bests of 7:44.26 minutes and 13:28.59 minutes, respectively, as well as the Greek record holder for the 10000 m in the M35 category. He also holds the national indoor records for the 1500 m (3:39.63) and 3000 m (7:43.66). He was a member of GS Ilioupolis, Olympiacos and AEK during his career.

He was a double bronze medallist in the 3000 metres and 5000 m at the 1997 European Cup. He was the first long-distance medallist for Greece at the European Athletics Indoor Championships and as of 2016, remains the only such Greek athlete.

Since September 2016 he is serving as a managing director for Panathinaikos youth academies, the team he is a fan of since childhood, as he stated.

== Personal bests ==
Outdoor

- 1500 m – 3:37.38 min (1997)
- 3000 m – 7:44.26 min (1996)
- 5000 m – 13:28.59 min (1995)
- 10,000 m – 29:18.85 min (2003)
- 3000 m s'chase – 8:28.62 min (1999)

Indoor

- 1500 m – 3:39.63 min (1998)
- 3000 m – 7:43.66 min (1998)
- All info from IAAF and All Athletics

== National titles ==
- Greek Athletics Championships
  - 1500 m: 1995, 1998
  - 5000 m: 1993, 1994, 1998, 2003

== International competitions ==
Year	Competition	Venue	Position	Event	Notes
1995	Universiade	Fukuoka, Japan	—	5000 m	DNF
1995	World Championships	Gothenburg, Sweden	11th (heats)	5000 m	14:00.93
1996	European Indoor Championships	Stockholm, Sweden	3rd	3000 m	7:50.80
1997	European Cup	Munich, Germany	3rd	3000 m	7:45.65
1997	European Cup	Munich, Germany	3rd	5000 m	13:40.02
1997	World Championships	Athens, Greece	10th (heats)	1500 m	3:40.30
1997	World Championships	Athens, Greece	12th (heats)	5000 m	13:58.27
1998	European Indoor Championships	Valencia, Spain	9th	3000 m	8:01.14
1998	World Cross Country Championships	Marrakesh, Morocco	52nd	Short race	11:41
1998	European Championships	Budapest, Hungary	12th (heats)	3000 m s'chase	8:45.01
1999	Balkan Indoor Championships	Piraeus, Greece	1st	1500 m	3:44.76
2000	European Indoor Championships	Ghent, Belgium	—	3000 m	DNF
