= Rui Silva (runner) =

Portuguese middle-distance runner (born 1977)

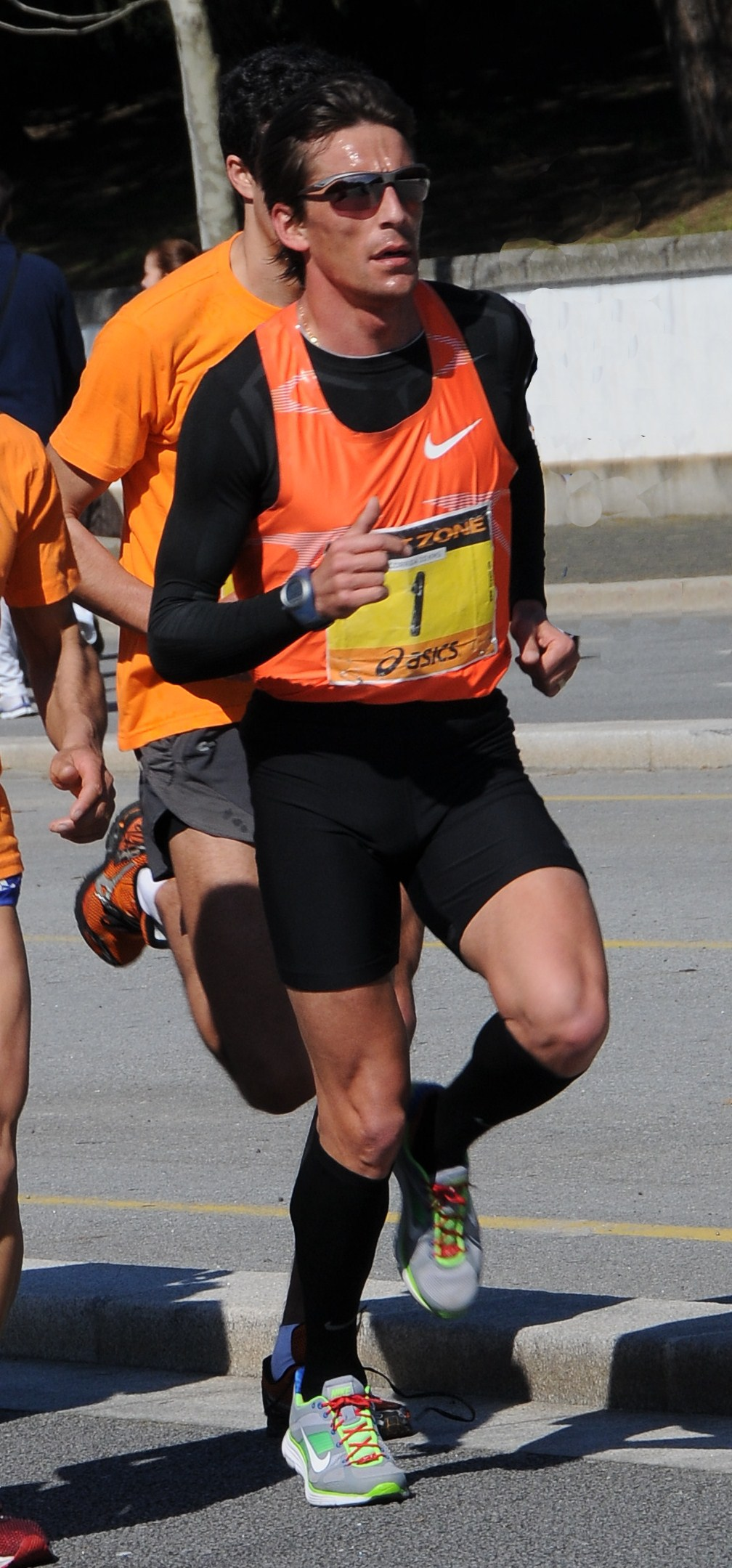
- Silva in 2010

Personal information
- Full name: Rui Manuel Monteiro Silva
- Nationality: Portuguese
- Born: 3 August 1977 (age 48) Santarém, Portugal
- Height: 1.75 m (5 ft 9 in)
- Weight: 65 kg (143 lb)

Sport
- Sport: Track and field (Running)
- Event(s): 1500 m, 3000 m
- Club: S.L. Benfica

Achievements and titles
- Olympic finals: Athens 2004: 1500 m – Bronze
- World finals: Lisbon 2001 (indoor): 1500 m – Gold
- Regional finals: Valencia 1998 (indoor): 1500 m – Gold; Vienna 2002 (indoor): 1500 m – Gold; Turin 2009 (indoor): 1500 m – Gold; Leiria 2009: 1500 m – Gold
Medal record
Men's athletics
Representing Portugal
Olympic Games
Bronze medal – third place	2004 Athens	1500 m
World Championships
Bronze medal – third place	2005 Helsinki	1500 m
World Indoor Championships
Gold medal – first place	2001 Lisbon	1500 m
Silver medal – second place	2004 Budapest	1500 m
European Championships
Silver medal – second place	1998 Budapest	1500 m
Bronze medal – third place	2002 Munich	1500 m
European Indoor Championships
Gold medal – first place	1998 Valencia	1500 m
Gold medal – first place	2002 Vienna	1500 m
Gold medal – first place	2009 Torino	1500 m
Silver medal – second place	2000 Ghent	1500 m

Rui Manuel Monteiro Silva ComIH (born 3 August 1977) is a Portuguese track and field athlete and coach who represents S.L. Benfica. As a distance runner, he specializes at the 1500 and 3000 m events, although he has at times run the 800 metres as well. Silva is the current national champion at 1500 m.

== Biography ==
Silva was the Olympic bronze medalist at Athens in 2004, where he went from last place to third place in less than 400 meters, his last lap being in 51.3 seconds. His last 800 meters of that race were run in 1:46.3, believed to be the second-fastest final 800 metres of any 1500-meter race in history (behind Abdi Bile's 1:46.0 at the 1987 World Championships). Injuries prevented him from participating in various international competitions from 2007 to 2009.

In addition to his Olympic medal, he won the 1500 m bronze at the 2005 World Championships in Athletics. He has had much success indoors over 1500 m, having won the World Indoor title in 2001 and taken the European Indoor title on three occasions.

Running in the European Cross Country, he came third running an even-paced race with a fast finish to claim the bronze position. The race was over 10 kilometres and was run at a very quick pace throughout. He began to move up in distance from 2009 onwards. He ran in the 5000 m and 10,000 metres at the 2011 World Championships in Athletics, being eliminated in the heats in shorter distance, but coming eleventh over the 10,000 m. He competed at the Lisbon Half Marathon in March 2012 and was the first Portuguese home in fourth place with a personal best of 1:02:40 hours.

His daughter is middle-distance runner, Patricia Silva. Patricia won a bronze medal at the women's 800m event at the World Athletics Indoor Championships in 2025.

== Competition record ==
Year	Competition	Venue	Position	Event	Notes
Representing Portugal
1995	European Junior Championships	Nyíregyháza, Hungary	8th	1500 m	3:50.75
1996	World Junior Championships	Sydney, Australia	6th	1500 m	3:41.81
1998	European Indoor Championships	Valencia, Spain	1st	1500 m	3:44.57
1998	European Championships	Budapest, Hungary	2nd	1500 m	3:41.84
1999	World Indoor Championships	Maebashi, Japan	5th	1500 m	3:34.99
1999	European U23 Championships	Gothenburg, Sweden	1st	1500 m	3:44.29
1999	World Championships	Seville, Spain	22nd (sf)	1500 m	3:50.85
2000	European Indoor Championships	Ghent, Belgium	2nd	3000 m	7:49.70
2000	Olympic Games	Sydney, Australia	32nd (h)	1500 m	3:41.93
2001	World Indoor Championships	Lisbon, Portugal	1st	1500 m	3:51.06
2001	World Championships	Edmonton, Canada	7th	1500 m	3:35.74
2002	European Indoor Championships	Vienna, Austria	1st	1500 m	3:49.93
2002	European Championships	Munich, Germany	3rd	1500 m	3:45.43
2003	World Indoor Championships	Birmingham, United Kingdom	20th (h)	1500 m	3:48.41
2003	World Championships	Paris, France	5th	1500 m	3:33.68
2004	World Indoor Championships	Budapest, Hungary	2nd	3000 m	7:57.08
2004	Olympic Games	Athens, Greece	3rd	1500 m	3:34.68
2005	World Championships	Helsinki, Finland	3rd	1500 m	3:38.02
2009	European Indoor Championships	Turin, Italy	1st	1500 m	3:44.38
2009	Lusophony Games	Lisbon, Portugal	2nd	800 m	1:49.03
2009	World Championships	Berlin, Germany	23rd (sf)	1500 m	3:41.30
2011	European Indoor Championships	Paris, France	6th	3000 m	7:59.49
2011	World Championships	Daegu, South Korea	22nd (h)	5000 m	13:50.16
2011	World Championships	Daegu, South Korea	11th	10,000 m	28:48.62
2012	Lisbon Half Marathon	Lisbon, Portugal	4th	Half marathon	1:02:40
