= Panathinaikos Athletics =

Panathinaikos AC
- Nicknames: The Trifolium; The Great Club
- Founded: 1919; 107 years ago
- League: SEGAS
- Based in: Athens, Greece
- Stadium: Olympic Stadium of Athens
- Colours: Green, White
- President: Dimitris Vranopoulos
- Head coach: Notis Papoulias
- Championships: 23 Men's Greek Championships; 5 Men's Greek Indoor Championships; 27 Men's Greek Cross Country Championships; 3 Women's Greek Championships; 2 Women's Greek Indoor Championships; 9 Women's Greek Cross Country Championships
- Website: pao1908.com

The athletics department of Panathinaikos A.O. was founded in 1919 by the football players of the team. Amongst its first athletes were Giorgos Kalafatis, Apostolos Nikolaidis, Loukas Panourgias and Michalis Papazoglou. It is the second oldest department of the club operating continuously since its foundation, only behind the football department.

In the 1928 Summer Olympics the athlete of the team, Antonis Kariofilis, became the first Greek to open the parade of nations.

After World War II, a strong team was created with Giannis Lambrou, Rigas Efstathiadis, Antonis Tritsis and others. In the 1960s the great pole vaulter Christos Papanikolaou also joined the team.

Through the next decades Panathinaikos won many Championships, in both men and women, becoming one of the strongest teams in the country. The men's team were Greek champions for 20 seasons in a row from 1955 to 1974, a record for Greek athletics until present day.

== History ==
The Panathinaikos Athletics track and field section was founded in 1919.

Giorgos Kalafatis, Apostolos Nikolaidis, Michalis Papazoglou, Giannis Stavropoulos, Dimitris Demertzis, Loukas Panourgias, Dimitriadis, and Ponireas were among the pioneers of the department.

The Club won its first national championship shortly thereafter, in 1921, in the men's category, while the first women's championship came in 1946.

In 1955, Panathinaikos won the men's championship — the first of 19 consecutive titles, a record-breaking achievement in Greek athletics, as from 1955 to 1974, Panathinaikos was the permanent Greek champion.

In 1970, Christos Papanikolaou achieved one of the greatest feats in the club's and Greece's sporting history by setting a world record in pole vault with a jump of 5.49 meters during the Balkan Games.

During the 1980s, Panathinaikos began to enjoy success in indoor track and field as well, while the next great moment for the “Shamrock” came with Chrysopigi Devetzi's silver medal in the 2004 Olympic Games.

The club's successes continued in the following years despite financial challenges.

The most successful year in terms of titles was 1982, when the department won 14 championships. Specifically: Men: Regional Outdoor Championship, Regional Racewalking Championship, Regional Cross-Country Championship of Athens–Piraeus

Young Men (U23): Greek Team Cross-Country Championship, Regional Team Championship of Athens–Piraeus Men & Juniors: Regional Racewalking Championship

Juniors: Greek Cross-Country Championship, Regional Cross-Country Championship of Athens–Piraeus, Interclub Championship of Attica, Regional Racewalking Championship

Girls (U20): Greek Cross-Country Championship, Regional Cross-Country Championship of Athens–Piraeus Boys (U16): Regional Championship of Athens–Piraeus

Girls (U16): Regional Championship of Athens–Piraeus

It is also worth noting that in the same year, Panathinaikos won the Skiadas Cup in cross-country running for both men and women.

== Current men's roster ==
- Nikos Andrikopoulos (Triple Jump)
- Angelos Bourdekas (400 m)
- Panagiotis Bourikas (Marathon)
- Petros Chatziou (Pole Vault)
- Giorgos Christakakos (Javelin Throw)
- Angelos Deligiannis (Hammer Throw)
- Konstantinos Gavalas (400 m, 800 m)
- Konstantinos Gennikis (Shot Put)
- Thanasis Kalakos (800 m)
- Spyros Karalis (Triple Jump, Long Jump)
- Christos Kosmidis (100 m)
- Arsenis Koulouris (Long Jump)
- Filippos Kyrikos (200 m)
- Charalampos Lagos (800 m)
- Dimitris Levantinos (400 m Hurdles)
- Vasilis Myrianthopoulos (100 m, 200 m)
- Andreas Papastergiou (Race Walking)
- Evangelos Plavoukos (Discus Throw, Shot Put)
- Vasilis Rokopanos (800 m, 1,500 m)
- Christos-Panagiotis Roumtsios (60 m Hurdles, 110 m Hurdles)
- Stelios Skordilis (Pole Vault)
- Iason Thanopoulos (Discus Throw)
- Ioannis Thymaras (Marathon, Half Marathon)
- Ioannis Voskopoulos (60 m, 100 m)
- Vasilis Vlachos (60 m, 100 m, 200 m, 400 m)

== Current women's roster ==
- Artemis-Melina Anastasiou (60 m, 100 m, 200 m)
- Denisa Balla (1,500 m, 3,000 m, Steeplechase, 5,000 m, 10,000 m)
- Andriana Bondioti (1,500 m, 3,000 m, Steeplechase, 5,000 m, 10,000 m)
- Georgia Despollari (400 m, 800 m)
- Maya-Michel Georgiadou (400 m Hurdles)
- Eirini Georgani (100 m)
- Dimitra Gnafaki (400 m Hurdles)
- Anthi-Koraini Kyriakopoulou (800 m, 1,500 m)
- Andriana Lykoudi (100 m, 200 m, 400 m)
- Janine-Maria Makaronidou (Half Marathon, Marathon)
- Pinelopi Nika (400 m, 800 m)
- Anastasia Rapti (200 m, 400 m)
- Konstantina Romaeou (Triple Jump, Long Jump)
- Panagiota Ftiara (Javelin Throw)

== Honours ==
- Greek Championship, Men: (25): 1955, 1956, 1957, 1958, 1959, 1960, 1961, 1962, 1963, 1964, 1965, 1966, 1967, 1968, 1969, 1970, 1971, 1972, 1973, 1974, 1977, 1989, 1990, 2025, 2026
- Greek Indoor Championship, Men: (7): 1986, 1989, 1990, 2023, 2024, 2025, 2026
- Greek Cross Country Championship, Men: (27) (record): 1930, 1931, 1932, 1933, 1934, 1938, 1954, 1955, 1956, 1968, 1969, 1970, 1971, 1972, 1973, 1974, 1975, 1977, 1978, 1979, 1980, 1983, 1996, 1997, 2012, 2016, 2021
- Greek Championship, Women: (3): 1946, 1947, 1949
- Greek Indoor Championship, Women: (3): 2023, 2024, 2026
- Greek Cross Country Championship, Women: (9): 1949, 1950, 1983, 1984, 1985, 1986, 2017, 2022, 2024

== Notable athletes ==
- Stylianos Kyriakides
- Hrysopiyi Devetzi
- Rigas Efstathiadis
- Konstantinos Gkelaouzos
- Aris Karageorgos
- Giannis Lambrou
- Alexandra Papageorgiou
- Christos Papanikolaou
- Michalis Papazoglou
- Hristos Polihroniou
- Konstantinos Poulios
- Nikolaos Regoukos
- Georgios Roubanis
- Antonis Tritsis
- Pavlos Tzanavaras
- Spilios Zacharopoulos
Michalis Papazoglou

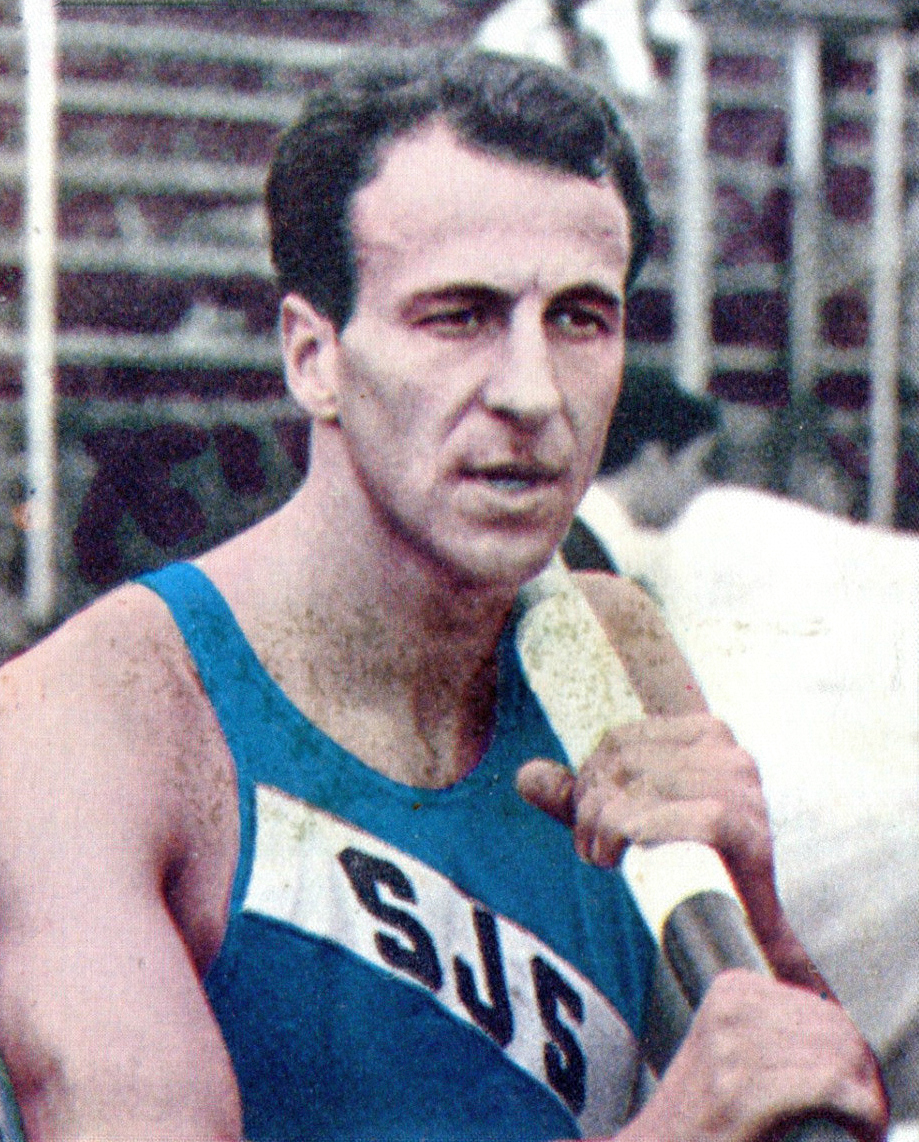
Christos Papanikolaou

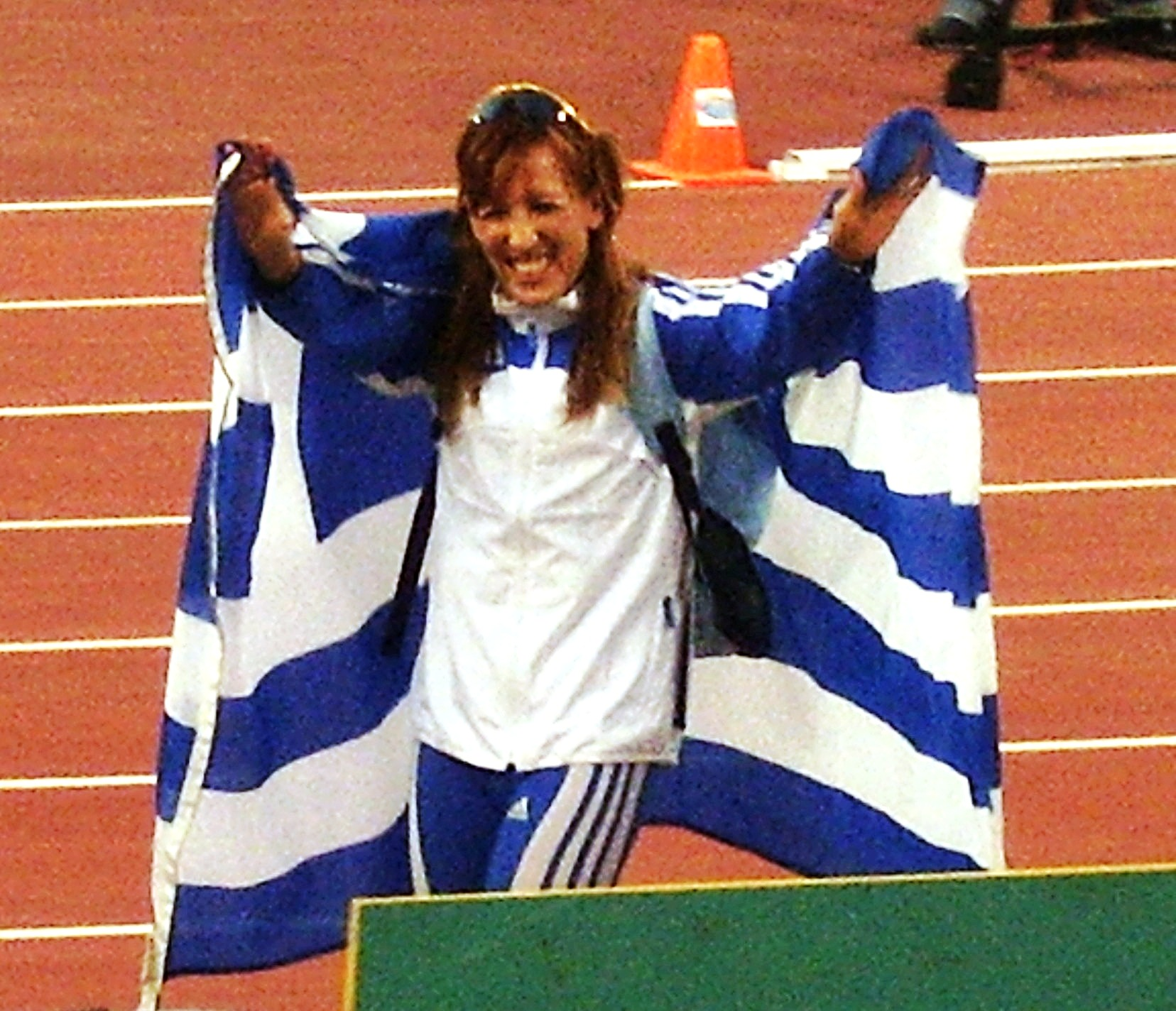
Hrysopiyi Devetzi

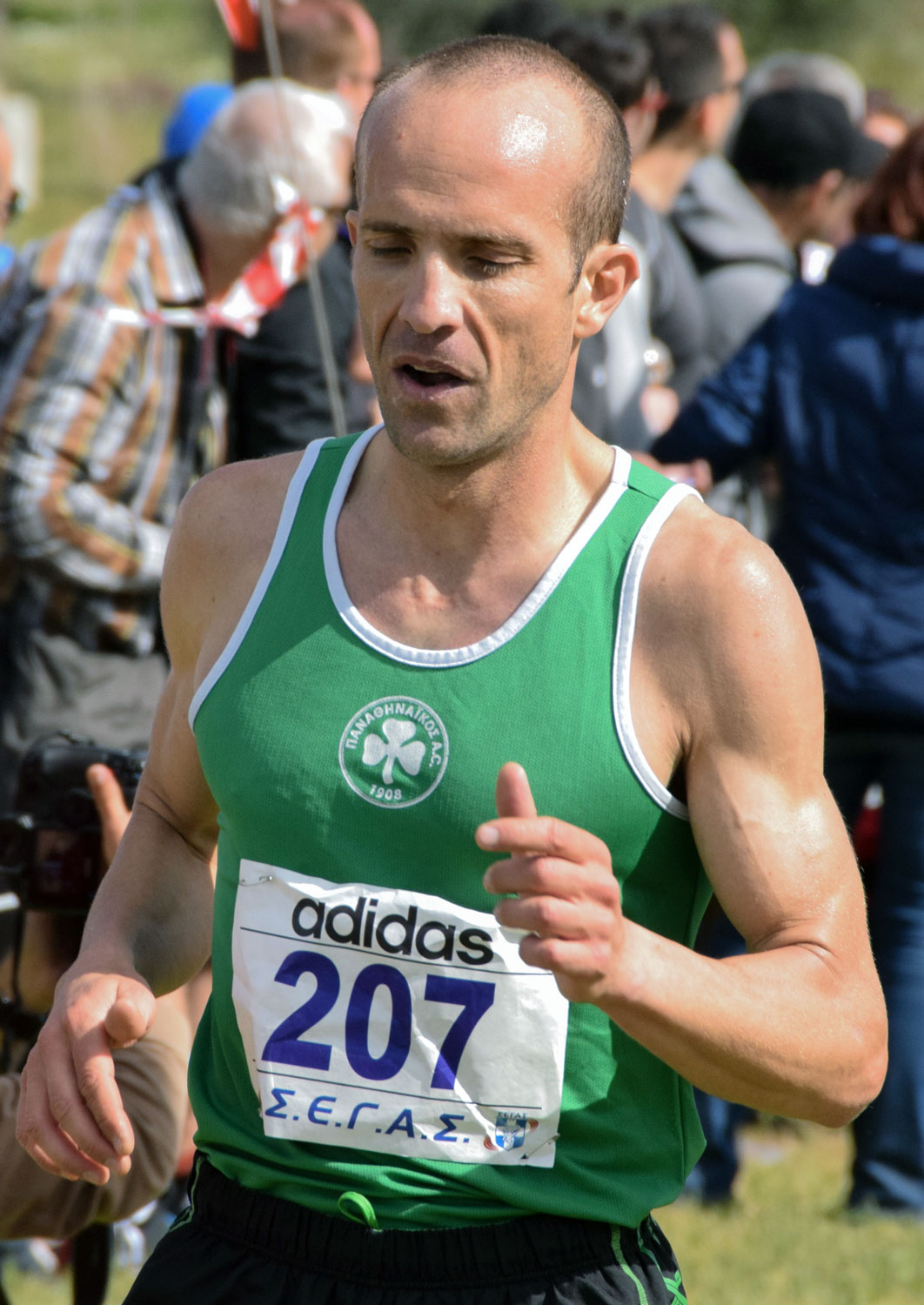
Konstantinos Poulios

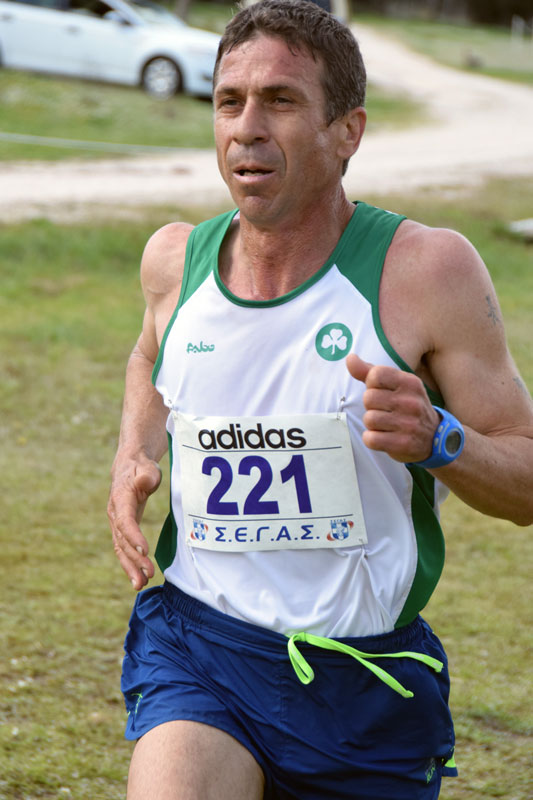
Pavlos Tzanavaras

== Sources ==
- 100 years Panathinaikos, Liveri, 2008
- Official website
