= Pavlos Tzanavaras =

Greek long-distance and trail runner (born 1969)

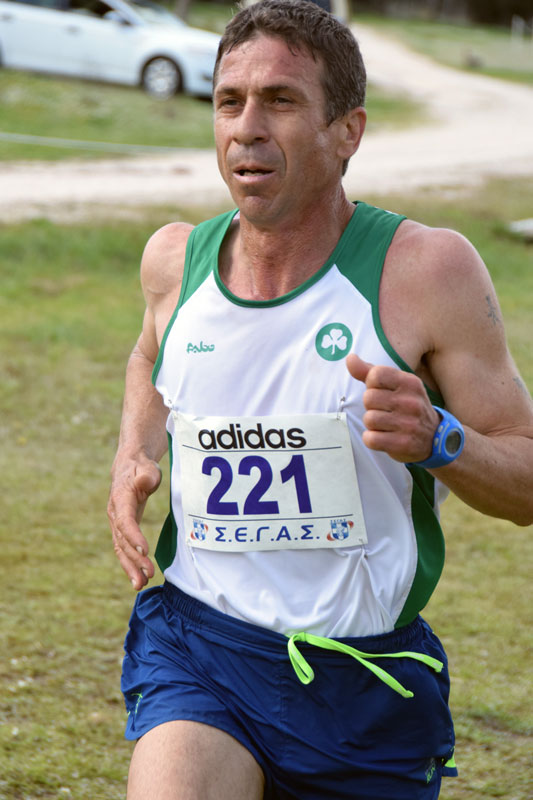

Personal information
- Born: 1969 (age 56–57) Athikia, Corinth, Greece

Sport
- Country: Greece
- Sport: Long-distance running, Trail running
- Event(s): 5000 metres, 10,000 metres, half marathon, marathon
- Club: Spartiatikos

Achievements and titles
- Personal bests: Half Marathon: 1:15:33 (2011); Marathon: 2:35:41 (2010)
- Updated on 31 December 2021

Pavlos Tzanavaras is a Greek long-distance and trail runner. He was born in 1969 in Athikia, Corinth where he still resides.

He holds the Panhellenic record in 10.000 meters for the M45 age category, with a time of 1:15:33 achieved in 2014 at Bucharest, Romania. In 2008 in Belgrade, he was placed 2nd at the Balkan Marathon Road Championship with a time of 2:41:02. He was also placed 3rd with a time of 1:06:09, on the first Panhellenic Trailroad Championship, organised by SEGAS in 2011 on the slopes of Parnitha.

He was competing for Panathinaikos until 2021.
