= John Mayock =

English middle-distance runner (born 1970)

Personal information
- Nationality: British (English)
- Born: 26 October 1970 (age 55) Sheffield, England
- Height: 180 cm (5 ft 11 in)
- Weight: 65 kg (143 lb)

Sport
- Sport: Athletics
- Event: middle/long-distance
- Club: Cannock & Stafford; Barnsley AC
Medal record
athletics
Representing England
Commonwealth Games
Silver medal – second place	1998 Kuala Lumpur	1500 m
Bronze medal – third place	1994 Victoria	1500 m
Representing Great Britain
European Indoor Championships
Gold medal – first place	1998 Valencia	3000 m
Silver medal – second place	1992 Genoa	3000 m
Silver medal – second place	2005 Madrid	3000 m
Bronze medal – third place	2000 Ghent	3000 m
Bronze medal – third place	2002 Vienna	3000 m
Summer Universiade
Gold medal – first place	1991 Sheffield	5000 m

John Paul Mayock (born 26 October 1970) is a male English retired middle-distance runner who competed at three Olympic Games, at the 1996 games in Atlanta and the 2000 games in Sydney in the 1500 metres and at the 2004 games in Athens in the 5000 metres.

== Biography ==
Mayock also competed at three Commonwealth Games, he represented England at the 1994 Commonwealth Games in Victoria, and England at the 1998 Commonwealth Games in Kuala Lumpur, where he won bronze and silver medals in the 1500 metres. He placed fourth for England at the 2002 Commonwealth Games in the 5,000 in Manchester.

He currently holds British indoor records for the 2000 m (4:57.09) and 2 miles (8:17.06). His previous record in the 3000 m (7:41.09) was broken by Mo Farah in 2009. Mayock represented Great Britain 58 times during his career. He has run an impressive 3:31.86 for 1500m and a mile in 3:50.32. He represented Great Britain 58 times and was also team captain.

He finished third in the 5,000 metres event at the 1992 AAA Championships and went on to win the British 1500 metres title seven times from 1995 to 2001.

== Competition record ==
Year	Competition	Venue	Position	Event	Notes
Representing Great Britain and England
1989	European Junior Championships	Varaždin, Yugoslavia	2nd	5000 m	14:11.05
1991	Universiade	Sheffield, United Kingdom	1st	5000 m	13:39.25
1992	European Indoor Championships	Genoa, Italy	2nd	3000 m	7:48.47
1992	World Cup	Havana, Cuba	7th	5000 m	14:16.95
1993	World Indoor Championships	Toronto, Canada	5th	3000 m	7:54.41
1994	Commonwealth Games	Victoria, Canada	3rd	1500 m	3:37.22
1995	World Indoor Championships	Barcelona, Spain	5th	3000 m	7:51.86
1995	World Championships	Gothenburg, Sweden	18th (sf)	1500 m	3:40.20
1996	Olympic Games	Atlanta, United States	11th	1500 m	3:40.18
1997	World Indoor Championships	Paris, France	6th	3000 m	7:44.31
1997	World Championships	Athens, Greece	9th	1500 m	3:38.67
1998	European Indoor Championships	Valencia, Spain	1st	3000 m	7:55.09
1998	Commonwealth Games	Kuala Lumpur, Malaysia	2nd	1500 m	3:40.46
1999	World Championships	Seville, Spain	6th (h)	1500 m	3:37.29
2000	European Indoor Championships	Ghent, Belgium	3rd	3000 m	7:49.97
2000	Olympic Games	Sydney, Australia	9th	1500 m	3:39.41
2001	World Indoor Championships	Lisbon, Portugal	4th	3000 m	7:44.08
2001	World Championships	Edmonton, Canada	21st (sf)	1500 m	3:42.63
2001	Goodwill Games	Brisbane, Australia	7th	Mile	3:58.49
2002	European Indoor Championships	Vienna, Austria	3rd	3000 m	7:48.08
2002	Commonwealth Games	Manchester, United Kingdom	4th	5000 m	13:19.43
2002	European Championships	Munich, Germany	12th	1500 m	3:48.41
2003	World Indoor Championships	Birmingham, United Kingdom	8th	3000 m	7:45.32
2004	World Indoor Championships	Budapest, Hungary	16th (q)	3000 m	7:54.41
2004	Olympic Games	Athens, Greece	17th (q)	5000 m	13:26.81
2005	European Indoor Championships	Madrid, Spain	2nd	3000 m	7:51.46
