= Leon Dubus =

French philatelist

Leon Dubus (18 February 1894 – 19 October 1981) was a French philatelist who was added to the Roll of Distinguished Philatelists in 1957.
