= Pavlos Valdaseridis =

Cypriot poet

Pavlos Valdaseridis was a poet, prose writer, translator and playwright. He was born in Larnaca, Cyprus in 1892 and lived many years in France. His poetry is lyrical, with intense religious elements and a philosophical mood. Valdaseridis died in 1972.

== Poetry ==
- Love for Beauty, Larnaca, Cyprus, 1921
- May Herbs (Mayovotana), Larnaca, Cyprus, 1938
- Hermes, Larnaca, 1947
- Cyprus, Athens, 1972
- Here the good Shepard (Ide o Kalos Poimin), ?

== Prose ==
- A look on life (Mia matia sti zoi), 1924
- The immortals (Oi athanatoi), 1943
