= Éric Dubus =

French middle-distance runner

Éric Dubus (born 28 February 1966 in Pézenas, Hérault) is a former French middle-distance runner, who became European Indoor Champion over 3000 metres in 1990, and was the silver medalist over 3000 m at the 1993 IAAF World Indoor Championships. Dubus finished fourth over 1500 metres at the 1994 European Athletics Championships in Helsinki.

== Competition record ==
| Year | Competition | Venue | Position | Event | Notes |
Representing France
| 1989 | Jeux de la Francophonie | Casablanca, Morocco | 2nd | 1500 m | 3:40.54 |
| 1990 | European Indoor Championships | Glasgow, United Kingdom | 1st | 3000 m | 7:53.94 |
| 1990 | European Championships | Split, Yugoslavia | 21st (h) | 1500 m | 3:44.47 |
| 1992 | European Indoor Championships | Genoa, Italy | 4th | 3000 m | 7:49.40 |
| 1993 | World Indoor Championships | Toronto, Canada | 2nd | 3000 m | 7:50.57 |
| 1994 | European Indoor Championships | Paris, France | 19th (h) | 3000 m | 8:12.15 |
| 1994 | European Championships | Helsinki, Finland | 4th | 1500 m | 3:37.44 |
| 1995 | World Championships | Gothenburg, Sweden | 15th (sf) | 1500 m | 3:39.73 |
| 1996 | European Indoor Championships | Stockholm, Sweden | 5th | 3000 m | 7:53.53 |
| 1996 | Olympic Games | Atlanta, United States | 47th (h) | 1500 m | 3:47.01 |
| 1998 | European Indoor Championships | Valencia, Spain | 10th | 3000 m | 8:02.36 |
| 2001 | World Indoor Championships | Lisbon, Portugal | 9th | 3000 m | 7:58.09 |
