= Gennaro Di Napoli =

Italian middle-distance runner

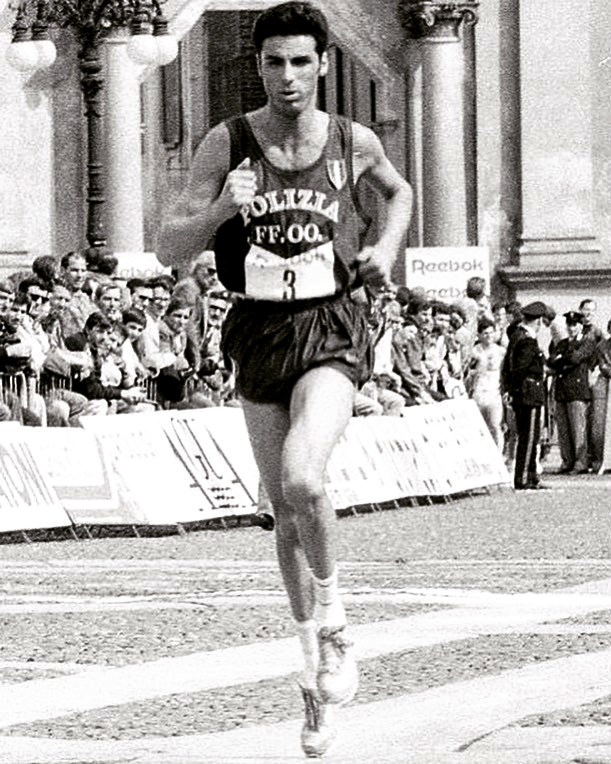
- Di Napoli with the crimson jersey of Fiamme Oro in 1980s

Personal information
- Nickname: Genny
- National team: Italy
- Born: 5 March 1968 (age 58) Naples, Italy
- Height: 1.82 m (5 ft 11 1/2 in)
- Weight: 62 kg (137 lb)

Sport
- Sport: Athletics
- Event: Middle-distance running
- Club: G.S. Fiamme Oro; Snam Gas Metano

Achievements and titles
- Personal bests: 800 m: 1:45.84; 1,500 m: 3:32.78 (1992); 3,000 m: 7:39.54; 5,000 m: 13:17.46 (1995)
Medal record
Men's athletics
Representing Italy
Event	1st	2nd	3rd
World Indoor Championships	2	0	0
European Championships	0	1	0
European Indoor Championships	1	0	0
European Cross Country C'ships	1	0	0
European Cup	3	1	2
Mediterranean Games	1	0	0
European Junior Championships	1	0	0
Total	9	2	2
World Indoor Championships
Gold medal – first place	1993 Toronto	3000 m
Gold medal – first place	1995 Barcelona	3000 m
European Championships
Silver medal – second place	1990 Split	1500 m
Mediterranean Games
Gold medal – first place	1991 Athens	1500 m

Gennaro Di Napoli (born 5 March 1968) is an Italian former middle-distance runner.

He won 13 medals at the International athletics competitions, 10 of these at senior level.

== Biography ==
Di Napoli was born in Naples but moved early in his life to Lombardy, in northern Italy. He excelled in the distances from 800 to 3,000 meters. He won the silver medal at the European Championships in Split 1990 over 1500 metres. He missed out on a medal at the World Championships 1991.

In 1992 Di Napoli scored a sensational victory over the world champion Noureddine Morceli from Algeria at the Golden Gala meeting in Rome. However, he got injured two weeks before the Barcelona Olympic Games in 1992, where he participated, but failed to reach the final. In 1993 di Napoli won the 3,000 m Indoor World Championships' gold medal; a title which he defended at the 1995 Indoor Championships. However, his achievements in outdoor races remained mixed.

== Achievements ==
Year	Competition	Venue	Position	Event	Notes
Representing Italy
1987	European Junior Championships	Birmingham, United Kingdom	1st	1500 m	3:52.10
1988	Olympic Games	Seoul, South Korea	21st (sf)	1500 m	3:43.58
1990	European Championships	Split, Yugoslavia	2nd	1500 m	3:38.60
1991	Mediterranean Games	Athens, Greece	1st	1500 m	3:42.80
1991	World Championships	Tokyo, Japan	8th	1500 m	3:36.56
1992	European Indoor Championships	Genoa, Italy	1st	3000 m	7:47.24
1992	Olympic Games	Barcelona, Spain	17th (sf)	1500 m	3:39.56
1993	World Indoor Championships	Toronto, Canada	1st	3000 m	7:50.26
1993	World Championships	Stuttgart, Germany	12th	1500 m	3:47.38
1994	European Championships	Helsinki, Finland	9th	1500 m	3:39.96
1995	World Indoor Championships	Barcelona, Spain	1st	3000 m	7:50.89
1995	World Championships	Gothenburg, Sweden	11th	5000 m	13:46.51
1996	Olympic Games	Atlanta, United States	12th	5000 m	13:28.36
(sf) Indicates overall position in semifinal round

== National titles ==
Di Napoli has won the individual national championship eight times.

- 3 wins in the 1500 metres (1990, 1991, 1992)
- 1 win in the 5000 metres (2000)
- 1 win in the cross country running (1996)
- 3 wins in the 3000 metres indoor (1997, 1999, 2000)

== See also ==
- Italian all-time lists – 1500 metres
- Italian all-time lists – 5000 metres
