= Andrés Díaz (runner) =

Spanish middle-distance runner

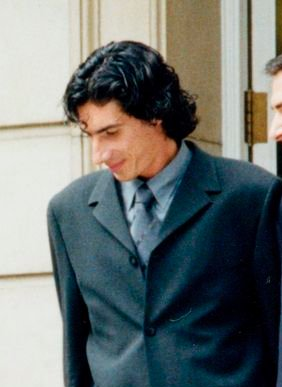

Personal information
- Born: 12 July 1969 (age 57) A Coruña, Spain

Sport
- Sport: Track and field
- Retired: 2003
Medal record
Representing Spain
Summer Universiade
Silver medal – second place	1995 Fukuoka	800 m
World Indoor Championships
Bronze medal – third place	1999 Maebashi	1500 metres

Andrés Manuel Díaz Díaz (born 12 July 1969) is a former Spanish middle-distance runner. He represented Spain at the Olympics in 1996 and 2000 and was the bronze medallist over 1500 metres at the 1999 IAAF World Indoor Championships.

His personal best outdoors is 3:31.48 minutes, but it was indoors where he excelled – his time of 3:33.32 minutes was the European indoor record until 2021.

== Career ==
His first international appearances came in 1995, when he reached the semi-finals of the 1995 IAAF World Indoor Championships and ran in the heats of the 1995 World Championships in Athletics. He won the silver medal at the 1995 Summer Universiade behind Hezekiél Sepeng. His Olympic debut came at the 1996 Atlanta Olympics, although he was knocked out in the first round of the 800 m. He narrowly missed out on a medal at the 1996 European Athletics Indoor Championships, coming fourth.

Díaz changed his focus to the 1500 metres from 1997 onwards and he knocked more than six seconds off his personal best that year, setting a time of 3:34.52 minutes. He reached the 1500 m final at the 1997 IAAF World Indoor Championships and finished in fifth place. A consecutive fourth-place finish at the 1998 European Athletics Indoor Championships saw him again outside of the medals on the major stage. He improved his time further to 3:32.17 minutes in July 1998 and came seventh at the 1998 IAAF Grand Prix Final that year. A surprise European indoor record for the 1500 m came at a meeting in Piraeus in February 1999 as he bettered Peter Elliott's record by over second with a run of 3:33.32 minutes. He ran another fast time at the 1999 IAAF World Indoor Championships the following month, just a little slower than Elliott's former record, but was beaten by Haile Gebrselassie and Laban Rotich, taking the bronze medal for his first podium finish on the major stage. The 1999 World Championships in Athletics in Seville saw Díaz, alongside Reyes Estévez and Fermín Cacho, vying for the 1500 m medals on home turf. In the fastest race ever seen at the competition, Díaz ran a personal best of 3:31.83 minutes but he ended up behind his compatriots with a fifth-place finish.

On his second outing on the Olympic stage he reached the 1500 m, taking seventh at the 2000 Sydney Games. After this performance he ran the best 1500 m of his career at the Herculis meet in Monaco, completing the distance in a time of 3:31.48 minutes. From 2001 to 2003, he began to run in the 3000 metres and he won a national title in and a silver medal at the 2001 European Cup. His last appearance on the world stage came at the 2001 World Championships in Athletics, but he did not manage to finish in his heat. He retired in 2003.
