= Mark Carroll (runner) =

Irish long-distance runner

Personal information
- Nationality: Irish
- Born: 15 January 1972 (age 54) Knocknaheeny, Cork
- Height: 177 cm (5 ft 10 in)
- Weight: 66 kg (146 lb)

Sport
- Sport: Athletics
- Event: long-distance
- Club: Leevale Athletic Club
Medal record
Men's athletics
Representing Ireland
European Championships
Bronze medal – third place	1998 Budapest	5000 m
European Indoor Championships
Gold medal – first place	2000 Ghent	3000 m

Mark Carroll (born 15 January 1972) is an Irish former runner who specialised in the 5000 metres. He was the 1991 European junior champion over 5,000m; 2000 European Indoor champion over 3,000m and won a bronze medal in the 1998 European Championships over 5,000m. He competed at two Olympic Games.

== Biography ==
Running for the Providence Friars track and field team, Carroll won the 1995 5000 meters at the NCAA Division I Indoor Track and Field Championships in a time of 13:55.15.

Carroll missed the 1996 Olympics due to injury and missed qualifying for the 5,000m final at the 2000 Olympics by one place. He finished 6th in the 2002 New York Marathon, but decided not to look to compete over that distance in the 2004 Olympics due to the heat and humidity in Athens. He has also been coaching other Irish athletes such as Gareth Turnbull since about 2005 and in 2008 was appointed US Athlete Manager for Athletics Ireland. In August, 2009 he was appointed head cross country coach at Auburn University. In June 2017, Carroll became the Director of Track and Field at Drake University. In 2019, he was named the High Performance Coach for the Boston Athletic Association.

Carroll won the British AAA Championships 1500 metres title in 2005.

== Achievements ==
Year	Competition	Venue	Position	Event	Notes
Representing Ireland
1995	World Championships	Gothenburg, Sweden	12th	5000 m	
1998	European Championships	Budapest, Hungary	3rd	5000 m	
1999	World Championships	Seville, Spain	14th	5000 m	
2000	European Indoor Championships	Ghent, Belgium	1st	3000 m	
2001	World Indoor Championships	Lisbon, Portugal	7th	3000 m	
2002	European Championships	Munich, Germany	6th	5000 m	
2002	New York City Marathon	New York, United States	6th	Marathon	2:10:54
2005	European Indoor Championships	Madrid, Spain	9th	3000 m	

=== Personal bests ===
- 1500 metres - 3:34.91 min (2000)
- One mile - 3:50.62 min (2000)
- 3000 metres - 7:30.36 min (1999) Irish Record
- 5000 metres - 13:03.93 min (1998)
- 10,000 metres - 27:46.82 min (2000)
- Marathon - 2:10:54 hrs (2002)
