= Alberto García (runner) =

Spanish runner (born 1971)

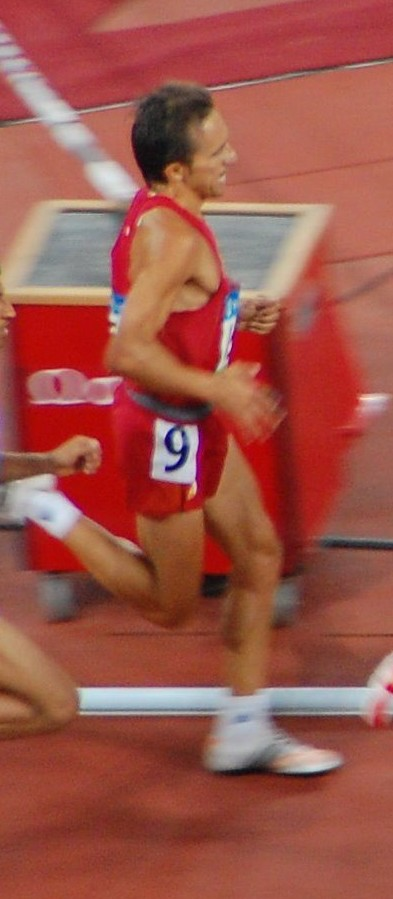

Medal record

Men's athletics

Representing Spain

European Championships
Gold medal – first place	2002 Munich	5000 m

European Cross Country Championships
Gold medal – first place	2007 Toro	Team
Silver medal – second place	2005 Tilburg	Individual
Silver medal – second place	2005 Tilburg	Team

Alberto García Fernández (born 22 February 1971 in Madrid, Spain) is a Spanish long-distance and cross-country runner.

== Career ==
Garcia's top-level athletic career took off when he was already approaching his thirties. He first came to prominence with a gold medal in the 5000 metres at the Mediterranean Games at Bari in 1997. The following year he finished 19th in the short race at the 1998 IAAF World Cross Country Championships and then finished 49th in the 1999 IAAF World Cross Country Championships. In the 2000 IAAF World Cross Country Championships he ran the long race and came in 29th. He failed to qualify for the 5000 metres finals at the 1999 World Championships and 2000 Olympics, but then came fourth in the 5000 metres at the 2001 World Championships and in the following year he became the European 5000 metres champion at the 2002 European Athletics Championships.

After serving a two-year suspension for doping, Garcia returned to competitive athletics. He finished second in the 2005 European Cross Country Championships behind Serhiy Lebid, and won the Cross Internacional de Venta de Baños. On the track, he was unable to reach the best times that he had recorded before his suspension.

García competed at the 2008 Summer Olympics in the 5000 metres, but did not qualify from the heats.

== Doping history ==
In May 2003 it was announced that Garcia had tested positive for the banned blood-booster Erythropoietin (EPO), following a control carried out on 29 March 2003 at Lausanne after the 2003 IAAF World Cross Country Championships. For this he received a two-year ban from competition.

On 9 December 2010 García was arrested and questioned in relation to his involvement in a Spanish athletics doping ring as part of Operation Galgo, an investigation being carried out by the Guardia Civil. On release from questioning he strongly denied to the press that he had engaged in drug trafficking.

== Records ==
- 1500 m: 3.35,69 (2001)
- Mile: 3.58,81 (1998)
- 2000 m: 4.56,08 (1997)
- 3000 m: 7.36,53 (2001)
- 5000 m: 13.02,54 (2001)
- 10000 m: 27.46,12 (1999)

== See also ==
- List of sportspeople sanctioned for doping offences
