= 1987 World Championships in Athletics – Men's 1500 metres =

These are the official results of the Men's 1,500 metres event at the 1987 IAAF World Championships in Rome, Italy. There were a total of 39 participating athletes, with three qualifying heats, two semi-finals and the final held on Sunday 6th September 1987. The winning margin was 1.23 seconds.

== Medalists ==
| Gold | Abdi Bile; Somalia (SOM) |
| Silver | José Luis González; Spain (ESP) |
| Bronze | Jim Spivey; United States (USA) |

== Final ==
| RANK | FINAL | TIME |
|---|---|---|
| | Abdi Bile (SOM) | 3:36.80 |
| | José Luis González (ESP) | 3:38.03 |
| | Jim Spivey (USA) | 3:38.82 |
| 4. | Joseph Chesire (KEN) | 3:39.36 |
| 5. | Omer Khalifa (SUD) | 3:39.81 |
| 6. | Jens-Peter Herold (GDR) | 3:40.14 |
| 7. | Michael Hillardt (AUS) | 3:40.23 |
| 8. | Steve Cram (GBR) | 3:41.19 |
| 9. | Han Kulker (NED) | 3:42.16 |
| 10. | Remy Geoffroy (FRA) | 3:43.03 |
| 11. | Kipkoech Cheruiyot (KEN) | 3:44.54 |
| 12. | Steve Scott (USA) | 3:45.92 |

== Semi-finals ==
- Held on Friday 1987-09-04

| RANK | HEAT 1 | TIME |
|---|---|---|
| 1. | Abdi Bile (SOM) | 3:35.67 |
| 2. | José Luis González (ESP) | 3:35.68 |
| 3. | Steve Cram (GBR) | 3:35.78 |
| 4. | Joseph Chesire (KEN) | 3:35.82 |
| 5. | Steve Scott (USA) | 3:35.91 |
| 6. | Han Kulker (NED) | 3:36.08 |
| 7. | Remy Geoffroy (FRA) | 3:37.47 |
| 8. | Leonid Masunov (URS) | 3:38.24 |
| 9. | Peter Bourke (AUS) | 3:38.42 |
| 10. | Chuck Aragon (USA) | 3:39.45 |
| 11. | Zeki Öztürk (TUR) | 3:42.17 |
| 12. | Dieter Baumann (FRG) | 3:47.71 |

| RANK | HEAT 2 | TIME |
|---|---|---|
| 1. | Jens-Peter Herold (GDR) | 3:40.57 |
| 2. | Jim Spivey (USA) | 3:40.63 |
| 3. | Kipkoech Cheruiyot (KEN) | 3:40.64 |
| 4. | Omer Khalifa (SUD) | 3:40.79 |
| 5. | Michael Hillardt (AUS) | 3:40.95 |
| 6. | Mario Silva (POR) | 3:41.12 |
| 7. | Marcus O'Sullivan (IRL) | 3:41.24 |
| 8. | Teófilo Benito (ESP) | 3:41.89 |
| 9. | Steve Crabb (GBR) | 3:42.12 |
| 10. | Uwe Becker (FRG) | 3:43.73 |
| 11. | Peter Rono (KEN) | 3:44.76 |
| 12. | Mogens Guldberg (DEN) | 3:50.79 |

== Qualifying heats ==
- Held on Thursday 1987-09-03

| RANK | HEAT 1 | TIME |
|---|---|---|
| 1. | Omer Khalifa (SUD) | 3:41.93 |
| 2. | Steve Cram (GBR) | 3:42.05 |
| 3. | Peter Rono (KEN) | 3:42.26 |
| 4. | Steve Scott (USA) | 3:42.43 |
| 5. | Remy Geoffroy (FRA) | 3:42.45 |
| 6. | Mike Hillardt (AUS) | 3:42.79 |
| 7. | Peter Wirz (SUI) | 3:43.00 |
| 8. | Ray Flynn (IRL) | 3:43.06 |
| 9. | Andrés Vera (ESP) | 3:43.24 |
| 10. | David Campbell (CAN) | 3:43.80 |
| 11. | Dieudonne Kwizera (BDI) | 3:44.36 |
| 12. | Manuel Balmaceda (CHI) | 3:49.52 |
| – | Ari Suhonen (FIN) | DNS |

| RANK | HEAT 2 | TIME |
|---|---|---|
| 1. | Abdi Bile (SOM) | 3:38.05 |
| 2. | Jens-Peter Herold (GDR) | 3:38.10 |
| 3. | Steve Crabb (GBR) | 3:38.11 |
| 4. | Peter Bourke (AUS) | 3:38.18 |
| 5. | Marcus O'Sullivan (IRL) | 3:38.20 |
| 6. | Dieter Baumann (FRG) | 3:38.31 |
| 7. | Mogens Guldberg (DEN) | 3:38.67 |
| 8. | Joseph Chesire (KEN) | 3:38.71 |
| 9. | Teofilo Benito (ESP) | 3:38.90 |
| 10. | Zeki Öztürk (TUR) | 3:40.38 |
| 11. | Chuck Aragon (USA) | 3:40.82 |
| 12. | Getahun Ayana (ETH) | 3:42.29 |
| 13. | Moubarak Mohamed Abdullah (UAE) | 3:51.04 |

| RANK | HEAT 3 | TIME |
|---|---|---|
| 1. | Kipkoech Cheruiyot (KEN) | 3:40.22 |
| 2. | José Luis González (ESP) | 3:40.28 |
| 3. | Han Kulker (NED) | 3:40.32 |
| 4. | Jim Spivey (USA) | 3:40.48 |
| 5. | Uwe Becker (FRG) | 3:40.63 |
| 6. | Leonid Masunov (URS) | 3:40.68 |
| 7. | Mário Silva (POR) | 3:40.99 |
| 8. | Adrian Passey (GBR) | 3:41.44 |
| 9. | Markus Hacksteiner (SUI) | 3:42.04 |
| 10. | Pat Scammell (AUS) | 3:44.93 |
| 11. | Gerry O'Reilly (IRL) | 3:45.77 |
| 12. | Johnny Kroon (SWE) | 3:49.06 |
| – | Mohamed El-Moctar Ould Khayar (MTN) | DNF |

== See also ==
- 1983 Men's World Championships 1,500 metres (Helsinki)
- 1984 Men's Olympic 1,500 metres (Los Angeles)
- 1986 Men's European Championships 1,500 metres (Stuttgart)
- 1988 Men's Olympic 1,500 metres (Seoul)
- 1990 Men's European Championships 1,500 metres (Split)
- 1991 Men's World Championships 1,500 metres (Tokyo)
