= 1991 World Championships in Athletics – Men's 1500 metres =

These are the official results of the Men's 1.500 metres event at the 1991 IAAF World Championships in Tokyo, Japan. There were a total number of 43 participating athletes, with three qualifying heats, two semi-finals and the final held on Sunday 1st September 1991. The winning margin was 2.00 seconds.

== Medalists ==
Gold	Noureddine Morceli; Algeria (ALG)
Silver	Wilfred Kirochi; Kenya (KEN)
Bronze	Hauke Fuhlbrügge; Germany (GER)

== Schedule ==
- All times are Japan Standard Time (UTC+9)

Heats
29.08.1991 – 16:50h
Semifinals
30.08.1991 – 17:30h
Final
01.09.1991 – 15:40h

== Records ==
Existing records at the start of the event.

World Record	Saïd Aouita (MAR)	3:29.46	Berlin, Germany	August 23, 1985
Championship Record	Abdi Bile (SOM)	3:35.67	Rome, Italy	September 4, 1987

== Final ==
RANK	FINAL	TIME
	Noureddine Morceli (ALG)	3:32.84 CR
	Wilfred Kirochi (KEN)	3:34.84
	Hauke Fuhlbrügge (GER)	3:35.28
4.	Jens-Peter Herold (GER)	3:35.37
5.	Fermín Cacho (ESP)	3:35.62
6.	Mario Silva (POR)	3:35.76
7.	David Kibet (KEN)	3:36.03
8.	Gennaro Di Napoli (ITA)	3:36.56
9.	Mohamed Suleiman (QAT)	3:38.12
10.	Matthew Yates (GBR)	3:38.71
11.	Saïd Aouita (MAR)	3:39.49
12.	Simon Doyle (AUS)	3:41.54

== Semi-finals ==
- Held on Friday 1991-08-30

RANK	HEAT 1	TIME
1.	Noureddine Morceli (ALG)	3:39.90
2.	Wilfred Kirochi (KEN)	3:40.73
3.	Fermín Cacho (ESP)	3:40.83
4.	Gennaro Di Napoli (ITA)	3:40.84
5.	Mario Silva (POR)	3:40.94
6.	Matthew Yates (GBR)	3:41.24
7.	Hauke Fuhlbrügge (GER)	3:41.41
8.	Peter Rono (KEN)	3:41.76
9.	Rachid El Basir (MAR)	3:42.89
10.	Mikael Svensson (SWE)	3:43.69
11.	João N'Tyamba (ANG)	3:44.64
12.	Pat Scammell (AUS)	3:45.17

RANK	HEAT 2	TIME
1.	Jens-Peter Herold (GER)	3:41.23
2.	Saïd Aouita (MAR)	3:41.45
3.	Mohamed Suleiman (QAT)	3:41.48
4.	Simon Doyle (AUS)	3:41.52
5.	David Kibet (KEN)	3:41.54
6.	Teófilo Benito (ESP)	3:41.61
7.	Steve Cram (GBR)	3:41.67
8.	José Luis González (ESP)	3:41.71
9.	Davide Tirelli (ITA)	3:43.08
10.	Mogens Guldberg (DEN)	3:44.34
11.	Sergey Melnikov (URS)	3:44.62
12.	Pascal Thiébaut (FRA)	3:45.18
13.	Mitsuhiro Okuyama (JPN)	3:49.96

== Qualifying heats ==
- Held on Thursday 1991-08-29

RANK	HEAT 1	TIME
1.	Noureddine Morceli (ALG)	3:43.45
2.	Teófilo Benito (ESP)	3:43.88
3.	Saïd Aouita (MAR)	3:43.93
4.	Peter Rono (KEN)	3:44.37
5.	Pat Scammell (AUS)	3:44.60
6.	Mikael Svensson (SWE)	3:44.66
7.	Steve Cram (GBR)	3:44.69
8.	Karol Dudij (POL)	3:44.89
9.	Mbiganyi Thee (BOT)	3:45.04
10.	Edgar de Oliveira (BRA)	3:45.59
11.	Alex Geissbühler (SUI)	3:46.38
12.	Terrance Herrington (USA)	3:47.28
13.	Dale Jones (ATG)	3:55.41
14.	Elonga Lucas Eningo (GEQ)	4:31.23
—	Abdi Bile (SOM)	DNS

RANK	HEAT 2	TIME
1.	Jens-Peter Herold (GER)	3:41.21
2.	José Luis González (ESP)	3:41.48
3.	Simon Doyle (AUS)	3:41.50
4.	Pascal Thiébaut (FRA)	3:41.50
5.	Wilfred Kirochi (KEN)	3:41.64
6.	Davide Tirelli (ITA)	3:41.77
7.	Mogens Guldberg (DEN)	3:42.00
8.	Sergey Melnikov (URS)	3:42.15
9.	Zeki Öztürk (TUR)	3:42.86
10.	Luis Núñez (DOM)	3:48.54
11.	Fabian Franco (GIB)	4:03.94
—	Han Kulker (NED)	DNS
—	Jim Spivey (USA)	DNS
—	Daouda Kassougue (MTN)	DNS

RANK	HEAT 3	TIME
1.	David Kibet (KEN)	3:38.07
2.	Rachid El Basir (MAR)	3:38.29
3.	Fermín Cacho (ESP)	3:38.31
4.	Mario Silva (POR)	3:38.37
5.	Gennaro Di Napoli (ITA)	3:38.63
6.	Hauke Fuhlbrügge (GER)	3:38.65
7.	Mohamed Suleiman (QAT)	3:38.89
8.	Matthew Yates (GBR)	3:39.30
9.	Mitsuhiro Okuyama (JPN)	3:40.35
10.	João N'Tyamba (ANG)	3:41.05
11.	Alemayehu Roba (ETH)	3:42.76
12.	José Lopez (VEN)	3:45.61
13.	Luis Martínez (GUA)	3:46.39
—	Joe Falcon (USA)	DNS

== See also ==
- 1987 Men's World Championships 1500 metres (Rome)
- 1988 Men's Olympic 1500 metres (Seoul)
- 1990 Men's European Championships 1500 metres (Split)
- 1992 Men's Olympic 1500 metres (Barcelona)
- 1993 Men's World Championships 1500 metres (Stuttgart)
