= 1993 World Championships in Athletics – Men's 1500 metres =

These are the official results of the Men's 1500 metres event at the 1993 IAAF World Championships in Stuttgart, Germany. There were a total number of 43 participating athletes, with four qualifying heats, three semi-finals and the final held on Sunday 22nd August 1993. The winning margin was 1.32 seconds.

== Final ==
RANK	FINAL	TIME
	Noureddine Morceli (ALG)	3:34.24
	Fermín Cacho (ESP)	3:35.56
	Abdi Bile (SOM)	3:35.96
4.	Mohamed Suleiman (QAT)	3:36.87
5.	Jim Spivey (USA)	3:37.42
6.	Matthew Yates (GBR)	3:37.61
7.	Rachid El Basir (MAR)	3:37.68
8.	Mohamed Taki (MAR)	3:37.76
9.	Simon Doyle (AUS)	3:38.04
10.	Rüdiger Stenzel (GER)	3:38.66
11.	Manuel Pancorbo (ESP)	3:39.68
12.	Gennaro Di Napoli (ITA)	3:47.38

== Semi-finals ==
- Held on Friday 1993-08-20

RANK	HEAT 1	TIME
1.	Fermín Cacho (ESP)	3:41.66
2.	Matthew Yates (GBR)	3:42.06
3.	Mohamed Suleiman (QAT)	3:42.12
4.	Rüdiger Stenzel (GER)	3:42.29
5.	Rachid El Basir (MAR)	3:42.48
6.	Mario Silva (POR)	3:42.85
7.	Christophe Impens (BEL)	3:42.85
8.	Branko Zorko (CRO)	3:43.12
9.	Jonah Birir (KEN)	3:43.79
10.	David Kibet (KEN)	3:44.92
11.	Azat Rakipov (BLR)	3:45.46
12.	Terrance Herrington (USA)	3:46.64

RANK	HEAT 2	TIME
1.	Noureddine Morceli (ALG)	3:40.07
2.	Abdi Bile (SOM)	3:40.65
3.	Gennaro Di Napoli (ITA)	3:41.06
4.	Simon Doyle (AUS)	3:41.06
5.	Jim Spivey (USA)	3:41.15
6.	Mohamed Taki (MAR)	3:41.26
7.	Manuel Pancorbo (ESP)	3:41.56
8.	Andrey Loginov (RUS)	3:42.11
9.	Vénuste Niyongabo (BDI)	3:42.34
10.	Joseph Chesire (KEN)	3:42.37
11.	Niall Bruton (IRL)	3:42.43
12.	Kevin Sullivan (CAN)	3:42.48
13.	Steve Cram (GBR)	3:42.63

== Qualifying heats ==
- Held on Thursday 1993-08-19

RANK	HEAT 1	TIME
1.	Fermín Cacho (ESP)	3:39.36
2.	Gennaro Di Napoli (ITA)	3:39.41
3.	Mohamed Taki (MAR)	3:39.57
4.	Simon Doyle (AUS)	3:39.61
5.	Joseph Chesire (KEN)	3:39.97
6.	Kevin Sullivan (CAN)	3:40.43
7.	Andrey Loginov (RUS)	3:40.84
8.	Edgar de Oliveira (BRA)	3:41.88
9.	Johan Landsman (RSA)	3:43.05
10.	Carlos Mairena (NCA)	3:54.21
11.	Gop Bahadur Adhikari (NEP)	3:54.47

RANK	HEAT 2	TIME
1.	Matthew Yates (GBR)	3:42.64
2.	Mohamed Suleiman (QAT)	3:42.75
3.	Mário Silva (POR)	3:42.81
4.	David Kibet (KEN)	3:42.98
5.	Azat Rakipov (BLR)	3:43.05
6.	Isaac Viciosa (ESP)	3:43.61
7.	Michael Busch (GER)	3:44.03
8.	Bill Burke (USA)	3:44.03
9.	Keiruan Tawai (VAN)	4:04.77
10.	Naseer Ismail (MDV)	4:12.11
	Davide Tirelli (ITA)	DNS

RANK	HEAT 3	TIME
1.	Noureddine Morceli (ALG)	3:37.84
2.	Christophe Impens (BEL)	3:38.87
3.	Steve Cram (GBR)	3:38.98
4.	Jonah Birir (KEN)	3:39.03
5.	Branko Zorko (CRO)	3:39.20
6.	Terrance Herrington (USA)	3:39.35
7.	Zeki Öztürk (TUR)	3:41.58
8.	Hamid Sadjadi (IRI)	3:41.66
9.	Jens-Peter Herold (GER)	3:50.64
10.	Juan Jose Tapia (PAN)	3:52.44
11.	Ali Khazaal (LIB)	4:02.62

RANK	HEAT 4	TIME
1.	Manuel Pancorbo (ESP)	3:39.91
2.	Rachid El Basir (MAR)	3:40.01
3.	Niall Bruton (IRL)	3:40.08
4.	Jim Spivey (USA)	3:40.08
5.	Vénuste Niyongabo (BDI)	3:40.18
6.	Rüdiger Stenzel (GER)	3:40.30
7.	Abdi Bile (SOM)	3:41.05
8.	Ovidiu Olteanu (ROM)	3:47.62
9.	Andrey Bulkovskiy (UKR)	3:50.02
10.	Mohamed Al-Malaki (YEM)	3:50.44
11.	Dale Jones (ATG)	3:54.91

== See also ==
- 1990 Men's European Championships 1500 metres (Split)
- 1991 Men's World Championships 1500 metres (Tokyo)
- 1992 Men's Olympic 1500 metres (Barcelona)
- 1994 Men's European Championships 1500 metres (Helsinki)
- 1995 Men's World Championships 1500 metres (Gothenburg)
