= Athletics at the 1988 Summer Olympics – Men's 1500 metres =

Men's 1500 metres at the Games of the XXIV Olympiad
- Olympic Athletics
- Venue: Seoul Olympic Stadium
- Dates: 29 September – 1 October
- Competitors: 59 from 46 nations
- Winning time: 3:35.96

Medalists
| 1st place, gold medalist(s) | | Peter Rono; Kenya |
| 2nd place, silver medalist(s) | | Peter Elliott; Great Britain |
| 3rd place, bronze medalist(s) | | Jens-Peter Herold; East Germany |

The men's 1500 metres event at the 1988 Summer Olympics in Seoul, South Korea had an entry list of 59 competitors from 46 nations, with four qualifying heats (59) and two semi-finals (26), before the final (12) took place on Saturday October 1, 1988. The maximum number of athletes per nation had been set at 3 since the 1930 Olympic Congress. The event was won by 0.19 seconds by Peter Rono of Kenya, the nation's first title in the event since 1968 and second overall.

== Summary ==
This race typified the tactical running of miles and 1500s of this era. Nobody really cared about leading early or pushing the pace. Marcus O'Sullivan took the point by default. The British new guard of Peter Elliott and Steve Cram were just behind Omer Khalifa marking the lead. Just before two laps to go, the Kenyan team decided to change position led by Peter Rono moving out to lane 2 and from dead last running past the entire field into first place. He was soon joined by Joseph Chesire, who served as a Kenyan wall at the front. The first challenge to the wall was Jeff Atkinson, who managed to get around Chesire but could not get past Rono. Cheshire's weakness exposed, the entire pack went around him, everybody aiming to be just off the lead at the bell, the ever-present Steve Scott behind Atkinson, the Britons, with Jens-Peter Herold, Han Kulker and Kipkoech Cheruiyot all jockeying for position behind Rono on the backstretch. Atkinson faded while Elliott, Cram and Herold emerged toward the front, still behind Rono who was watching over his shoulder. Cram poised himself on Elliott's shoulder to make the big move coming off the turn with Scott, Kulker and Cheruiyot showing similar aspirations a step behind. But the only big move was Herold sneaking past Elliott on the inside while Elliott was concerned with Cram on his outside. Nobody's big move really advanced their position, Elliott using his best sprinting to just edge back ahead of Herold by the finish line for silver, Rono untested ahead of everyone.

== Background ==
This was the 21st appearance of the event, which is one of 12 athletics events to have been held at every Summer Olympics. Five finalists from 1984 returned: silver medalist Steve Cram of Great Britain, fourth-place finisher Joseph Chesire of Kenya, sixth-place finisher Peter Wirz of Switzerland, eighth-place finisher Omar Khalifa of Sudan, and tenth-place finisher Steve Scott of the United States. Sebastian Coe, the two-time defending gold medalist, "was not chosen for the British team" after the British trials. Abdi Bile of Somalia, the 1987 World Champion, withdrew due to a tibial stress fracture. Saïd Aouita of Morocco, who had set the world record in 1985, competed, and qualified for the semi-finals but withdrew before the start of the race: having been nursing a hamstring injury through winning the bronze medal in the 800m a few days before, in the attempt to double up on both distances.

Andorra, Angola, the People's Republic of China, Cyprus, Djibouti, Fiji, Mauritania, Nepal, Papua New Guinea, Paraguay, Qatar, and North Yemen each made their first appearance in the event. The United States made its 20th appearance, most of all nations (having missed only the boycotted 1980 Games).

== Competition format ==
The competition was again three rounds (used previously in 1952 and since 1964). The "fastest loser" system introduced in 1964 was used for both the first round and semifinals. The 12-man finals introduced in 1984 continued to be used, but the semifinals expanded to 13 runners each.

There were four heats in the first round, each with 15 runners (before one withdrawal left a heat with 14 runners). The top five runners in each heat, along with the next six fastest overall, advanced to the semifinals. The 26 semifinalists were divided into two semifinals, each with 13 runners. The top five men in each semifinal, plus the next two fastest overall, advanced to the 12-man final.

== Records ==
These were the standing world and Olympic records prior to the 1988 Summer Olympics.

| World record | Saïd Aouita (MAR) | 3:29.46 | West Berlin, West Germany | 23 August 1985 |
| Olympic record | Sebastian Coe (GBR) | 3:32.53 | Los Angeles, United States | 11 August 1984 |

No new world or Olympic records were set during the competition.

== Schedule ==
All times are Korea Standard Time adjusted for daylight savings (UTC+10)

| Date | Time | Round |
|---|---|---|
| Thursday, 29 September 1988 | 15:15 | Round 1 |
| Friday, 30 September 1988 | 12:40 | Semifinals |
| Saturday, 1 October 1988 | 13:10 | Final |

== Results ==
=== Round 1 ===
First 5 of each heat (Q) and next 6 fastest (q) qualified for the semifinals.

==== Heat 1 ====
| Rank | Athlete | Nation | Time | Notes |
|---|---|---|---|---|
| 1 | Steve Cram | Great Britain | 3:40.89 | Q |
| 2 | Steve Scott | United States | 3:41.57 | Q |
| 3 | Rémy Geoffroy | France | 3:41.68 | Q |
| 4 | Joseph Chesire | Kenya | 3:41.72 | Q |
| 5 | Gennaro Di Napoli | Italy | 3:41.85 | Q |
| 6 | Marcus O'Sullivan | Ireland | 3:42.01 | q |
| 7 | Ari Suhonen | Finland | 3:43.61 | |
| 8 | José Luíz Barbosa | Brazil | 3:44.46 | |
| 9 | Branko Zorko | Yugoslavia | 3:45.52 | |
| 10 | Michael Watson | Bermuda | 3:46.49 | |
| 11 | Melford Homela | Zimbabwe | 3:47.38 | |
| 12 | Hoche Yaya Aden | Djibouti | 3:51.56 | |
| 13 | Eugénio Katombi | Angola | 3:54.25 | |
| 14 | Modupe Jonah | Sierra Leone | 3:55.15 | |
| 15 | Mohamed Ould Khayar | Mauritania | 4:12.18 | |

==== Heat 2 ====
| Rank | Athlete | Nation | Time | Notes |
|---|---|---|---|---|
| 1 | Kipkoech Cheruiyot | Kenya | 3:39.98 | Q |
| 2 | Mark Deady | United States | 3:41.91 | Q |
| 3 | Mogens Guldberg | Denmark | 3:42.01 | Q |
| 4 | Saïd Aouita | Morocco | 3:42.18 | Q |
| 5 | Mario Silva | Portugal | 3:42.24 | Q |
| 6 | Marcus Rapp | Switzerland | 3:42.64 | |
| 7 | David Campbell | Canada | 3:42.97 | |
| 8 | Mohamed Suleiman | Qatar | 3:44.43 | |
| 9 | Duan Xiuquan | China | 3:44.88 | |
| 10 | Pat Scammell | Australia | 3:45.21 | |
| 11 | Jama Aden | Somalia | 3:49.84 | |
| 12 | Ramón López | Paraguay | 3:53.31 | |
| 13 | Kenneth Dzekedzeke | Malawi | 4:02.61 | |
| 14 | Bernardo Elonga | Equatorial Guinea | 4:16.40 | |
| — | Nimley Twegbe | Liberia | DNS | |

==== Heat 3 ====
| Rank | Athlete | Nation | Time | Notes |
|---|---|---|---|---|
| 1 | Peter Rono | Kenya | 3:37.65 | Q |
| 2 | Jeff Atkinson | United States | 3:38.33 | Q |
| 3 | Peter Elliott | Great Britain | 3:38.60 | Q |
| 4 | Markus Hacksteiner | Switzerland | 3:39.05 | Q |
| 5 | Mostafa Lachal | Morocco | 3:39.20 | Q |
| 6 | Rachid Kram | Algeria | 3:39.90 | q |
| 7 | Joaquim Cruz | Brazil | 3:40.92 | q |
| 8 | Mbiganyi Thee | Botswana | 3:41.97 | q |
| 9 | Spyros Spyrou | Cyprus | 3:42.32 | q |
| 10 | Gerry O'Reilly | Ireland | 3:43.23 | |
| 11 | Jo Jin-Saeng | South Korea | 3:45.63 | |
| 12 | Jan Kubista | Czechoslovakia | 3:46.41 | |
| 13 | Moses Zarak Khan | Fiji | 4:03.20 | |
| 14 | Awad Saleh Ahmed | North Yemen | 4:03.86 | |
| 15 | Johnd Siguria | Papua New Guinea | 4:07.04 | |

==== Heat 4 ====
| Rank | Athlete | Nation | Time | Notes |
|---|---|---|---|---|
| 1 | Jens-Peter Herold | East Germany | 3:40.87 | Q |
| 2 | Han Kulker | Netherlands | 3:40.90 | Q |
| 3 | Steve Crabb | Great Britain | 3:41.12 | Q |
| 4 | Peter Wirz | Switzerland | 3:41.26 | Q |
| 5 | Omer Khalifa | Sudan | 3:41.46 | Q |
| 6 | Abdelmajide Moncif | Morocco | 3:41.73 | q |
| 7 | Mahmoud Kalboussi | Tunisia | 3:43.72 | |
| 8 | Dale Jones | Antigua and Barbuda | 3:51.22 | |
| 9 | Hameed Al-Dousari | Saudi Arabia | 3:51.53 | |
| 10 | Eulucane Ndagijimana | Rwanda | 3:51.61 | |
| 11 | Josep Graells | Andorra | 3:52.68 | |
| 12 | Zeki Öztürk | Turkey | 3:54.26 | |
| 13 | Douglas Consiglio | Canada | 3:55.31 | |
| 14 | Seid Gayaplé | Chad | 3:58.46 | |
| 15 | Haribahadur Rokaya | Nepal | 4:01.17 | |

==== Overall results for round 1 ====
| Rank | Heat | Athlete | Nation | Time | Notes |
|---|---|---|---|---|---|
| 1 | 3 | Peter Rono | Kenya | 3:37.65 | Q |
| 2 | 3 | Jeff Atkinson | United States | 3:38.33 | Q |
| 3 | 3 | Peter Elliott | Great Britain | 3:38.60 | Q |
| 4 | 3 | Markus Hacksteiner | Switzerland | 3:39.05 | Q |
| 5 | 3 | Mostafa Lachal | Morocco | 3:39.20 | Q |
| 6 | 3 | Rachid Kram | Algeria | 3:39.90 | q |
| 7 | 2 | Kipkoech Cheruiyot | Kenya | 3:39.98 | Q |
| 8 | 4 | Jens-Peter Herold | East Germany | 3:40.87 | Q |
| 9 | 1 | Steve Cram | Great Britain | 3:40.89 | Q |
| 10 | 4 | Han Kulker | Netherlands | 3:40.90 | Q |
| 11 | 3 | Joaquim Cruz | Brazil | 3:40.92 | q |
| 12 | 4 | Steve Crabb | Great Britain | 3:41.12 | Q |
| 13 | 4 | Peter Wirz | Switzerland | 3:41.26 | Q |
| 14 | 4 | Omer Khalifa | Sudan | 3:41.46 | Q |
| 15 | 1 | Steve Scott | United States | 3:41.57 | Q |
| 16 | 1 | Rémy Geoffroy | France | 3:41.68 | Q |
| 17 | 1 | Joseph Chesire | Kenya | 3:41.72 | Q |
| 18 | 4 | Abdelmajide Moncif | Morocco | 3:41.73 | q |
| 19 | 1 | Gennaro Di Napoli | Italy | 3:41.85 | Q |
| 20 | 2 | Mark Deady | United States | 3:41.91 | Q |
| 21 | 3 | Mbiganyi Thee | Botswana | 3:41.97 | q |
| 22 | 1 | Marcus O'Sullivan | Ireland | 3:42.01 | q |
| 22 | 2 | Mogens Guldberg | Denmark | 3:42.01 | Q |
| 24 | 2 | Saïd Aouita | Morocco | 3:42.18 | Q |
| 25 | 2 | Mario Silva | Portugal | 3:42.24 | Q |
| 26 | 3 | Spyros Spyrou | Cyprus | 3:42.32 | q |
| 27 | 2 | Marcus Rapp | Switzerland | 3:42.64 | |
| 28 | 2 | David Campbell | Canada | 3:42.97 | |
| 29 | 3 | Gerry O'Reilly | Ireland | 3:43.23 | |
| 30 | 1 | Ari Suhonen | Finland | 3:43.61 | |
| 31 | 4 | Mahmoud Kalboussi | Tunisia | 3:43.72 | |
| 32 | 2 | Mohamed Suleiman | Qatar | 3:44.43 | |
| 33 | 1 | José Luíz Barbosa | Brazil | 3:44.46 | |
| 34 | 2 | Duan Xiuquan | China | 3:44.88 | |
| 35 | 2 | Pat Scammell | Australia | 3:45.21 | |
| 36 | 1 | Branko Zorko | Yugoslavia | 3:45.52 | |
| 37 | 3 | Jo Jin-Saeng | South Korea | 3:45.63 | |
| 38 | 3 | Jan Kubista | Czechoslovakia | 3:46.41 | |
| 39 | 1 | Michael Watson | Bermuda | 3:46.49 | |
| 40 | 1 | Melford Homela | Zimbabwe | 3:47.38 | |
| 41 | 2 | Jama Aden | Somalia | 3:49.84 | |
| 42 | 4 | Dale Jones | Antigua and Barbuda | 3:51.22 | |
| 43 | 4 | Hameed Al-Dousari | Saudi Arabia | 3:51.53 | |
| 44 | 1 | Hoche Yaya Aden | Djibouti | 3:51.56 | |
| 45 | 4 | Eulucane Ndagijimana | Rwanda | 3:51.61 | |
| 46 | 4 | Josep Graells | Andorra | 3:52.68 | |
| 47 | 2 | Ramón López | Paraguay | 3:53.31 | |
| 48 | 1 | Eugénio Katombi | Angola | 3:54.25 | |
| 49 | 4 | Zeki Öztürk | Turkey | 3:54.26 | |
| 50 | 1 | Modupe Jonah | Sierra Leone | 3:55.15 | |
| 51 | 4 | Douglas Consiglio | Canada | 3:55.31 | |
| 52 | 4 | Seid Gayaplé | Chad | 3:58.46 | |
| 53 | 4 | Haribahadur Rokaya | Nepal | 4:01.17 | |
| 54 | 2 | Kenneth Dzekedzeke | Malawi | 4:02.61 | |
| 55 | 3 | Moses Zarak Khan | Fiji | 4:03.20 | |
| 56 | 3 | Awad Saleh Ahmed | North Yemen | 4:03.86 | |
| 57 | 3 | Johnd Siguria | Papua New Guinea | 4:07.04 | |
| 58 | 1 | Mohamed Ould Khayar | Mauritania | 4:12.18 | |
| 59 | 2 | Bernardo Elonga | Equatorial Guinea | 4:16.40 | |
| — | 2 | Nimely Twegbe | Liberia | DNS | |

=== Semifinals ===
The semifinals were held on Friday September 30, 1988.

==== Semifinal 1 ====
| Rank | Athlete | Nation | Time | Notes |
|---|---|---|---|---|
| 1 | Kipkoech Cheruiyot | Kenya | 3:38.09 | Q |
| 2 | Steve Cram | Great Britain | 3:38.30 | Q |
| 3 | Peter Elliott | Great Britain | 3:38.56 | Q |
| 4 | Han Kulker | Netherlands | 3:39.06 | Q |
| 5 | Jeff Atkinson | United States | 3:39.12 | Q |
| 6 | Joseph Chesire | Kenya | 3:39.17 | q |
| 7 | Mogens Guldberg | Denmark | 3:39.86 | |
| 8 | Remi Geoffroy | France | 3:40.96 | |
| 9 | Rachid Kram | Algeria | 3:41.39 | |
| 10 | Spyros Spyrou | Cyprus | 3:43.49 | |
| — | Abdelmajide Moncif | Morocco | DNF | |
| — | Peter Wirz | Switzerland | DNF | |
| — | Joaquim Cruz | Brazil | DNS | |

==== Semifinal 2 ====
| Rank | Athlete | Nation | Time | Notes |
|---|---|---|---|---|
| 1 | Steve Scott | United States | 3:38.20 | Q |
| 2 | Peter Rono | Kenya | 3:38.25 | Q |
| 3 | Omer Khalifa | Sudan | 3:38.40 | Q |
| 4 | Mario Silva | Portugal | 3:38.56 | Q |
| 5 | Jens-Peter Herold | East Germany | 3:38.59 | Q |
| 6 | Marcus O'Sullivan | Ireland | 3:38.84 | q |
| 7 | Markus Hacksteiner | Switzerland | 3:39.18 | |
| 8 | Mark Deady | United States | 3:39.47 | |
| 9 | Steve Crabb | Great Britain | 3:39.55 | |
| 10 | Mbiganyi Thee | Botswana | 3:42.62 | |
| 11 | Gennaro Di Napoli | Italy | 3:43.58 | |
| 12 | Mostafa Lachal | Morocco | 3:45.65 | |
| — | Saïd Aouita | Morocco | DNS | |

=== Final ===
| Rank | Athlete | Nation | Time |
|---|---|---|---|
| 1st place, gold medalist(s) | Peter Rono | Kenya | 3:35.96 |
| 2nd place, silver medalist(s) | Peter Elliott | Great Britain | 3:36.15 |
| 3rd place, bronze medalist(s) | Jens-Peter Herold | East Germany | 3:36.21 |
| 4 | Steve Cram | Great Britain | 3:36.24 |
| 5 | Steve Scott | United States | 3:36.99 |
| 6 | Han Kulker | Netherlands | 3:37.08 |
| 7 | Kipkoech Cheruiyot | Kenya | 3:37.94 |
| 8 | Marcus O'Sullivan | Ireland | 3:38.39 |
| 9 | Mario Silva | Portugal | 3:38.77 |
| 10 | Jeff Atkinson | United States | 3:40.80 |
| 11 | Joseph Chesire | Kenya | 3:40.82 |
| 12 | Omer Khalifa | Sudan | 3:41.07 |

== See also ==
- 1986 Men's European Championships 1500 metres (Stuttgart)
- 1987 Men's World Championships 1500 metres (Rome)
- 1990 Men's European Championships 1500 metres (Split)
- 1991 Men's World Championships 1500 metres (Tokyo)
