= 1987 IAAF World Indoor Championships – Men's 1500 metres =

The men's 1500 metres event at the 1987 IAAF World Indoor Championships was held at the Hoosier Dome in Indianapolis on 6 and 7 March.

== Medalists ==
Gold	Silver	Bronze
Marcus O'Sullivan; Ireland	José Manuel Abascal; Spain	Han Kulker; Netherlands

== Results ==
=== Heats ===
The first 3 of each heat (Q) and next 3 fastest (q) qualified for the final.

Rank	Heat	Name	Nationality	Time	Notes
1	1	José Manuel Abascal	Spain	3:40.92	Q
2	1	Marcus O'Sullivan	Ireland	3:40.96	Q
3	1	Kipkoech Cheruiyot	Kenya	3:40.97	Q
4	1	Han Kulker	Netherlands	3:41.36	q
5	1	Alessandro Lambruschini	Italy	3:42.26	q
6	2	Michael Hillardt	Australia	3:42.66	Q
7	2	Jim Spivey	United States	3:43.24	Q
8	2	Dieter Baumann	West Germany	3:43.35	Q
9	2	David Campbell	Canada	3:43.36	q
10	2	Eamonn Coghlan	Ireland	3:43.40	
11	2	Mbiganyi Thee	Botswana	3:44.33	NR
12	2	Tapfumaneyi Jonga	Zimbabwe	3:44.43	NR
13	1	Hervé Phélippeau	France	3:45.26	
14	2	Peter Rono	Kenya	3:48.81	
15	1	Mauricio Hernández	Mexico	3:49.77	NR
16	2	Dale Jones	Antigua and Barbuda	4:04.14	NR
17	2	Alberto López	Guatemala	4:06.93	NR
	1	Agberto Guimarães	Brazil	DNS	
	1	Muktar Ibrahim	Nigeria	DNS	

=== Final ===
Rank	Name	Nationality	Time	Notes
1st place, gold medalist(s)	Marcus O'Sullivan	Ireland	3:39.04	CR, PB
2nd place, silver medalist(s)	José Manuel Abascal	Spain	3:39.13	
3rd place, bronze medalist(s)	Han Kulker	Netherlands	3:39.51	NR
4	Jim Spivey	United States	3:39.63	PB
5	Michael Hillardt	Australia	3:39.77	NR
6	David Campbell	Canada	3:40.82	PB
7	Dieter Baumann	West Germany	3:41.07	
8	Alessandro Lambruschini	Italy	3:42.25	
9	Kipkoech Cheruiyot	Kenya	3:43.63	
