= Athletics at the 1992 Summer Olympics – Men's 1500 metres =

Men's 1500 metres at the Games of the XXV Olympiad
- Olympic Athletics
- Venue: Estadi Olímpic de Montjuïc
- Dates: August 3–8
- Competitors: 51 from 40 nations
- Winning time: 3:40.12

Medalists
1st place, gold medalist(s)		Fermín Cacho; Spain
2nd place, silver medalist(s)		Rachid El Basir; Morocco
3rd place, bronze medalist(s)		Mohamed Suleiman; Qatar

Official Video Highlights

The men's 1500 metres was an event at the 1992 Summer Olympics in Barcelona, Spain. There were a total number of 51 participating athletes from 40 nations, with four qualifying heats. The maximum number of athletes per nation had been set at 3 since the 1930 Olympic Congress. The event was held from 3 to 8 August 1992. The event was won by 0.50 seconds by Fermín Cacho of Spain, the nation's first title in the men's 1500 metres. Morocco won its first medal in the event with Rachid El Basir's silver. Qatar won its first Olympic medal in any event with Mohamed Suleiman's bronze.

== Summary ==
Most of the eyes were on reigning world champion Noureddine Morceli, who hovered in the middle of the pack, while Joseph Chesire led most of the race, marked by Jens-Peter Herold through a slow race of 62.25 and 64.58 for the first two laps, setting up a fast finish. A step behind the leaders, as the pace quickened going into the final lap, home team favorite Fermín Cacho who had been strategically watching the field, pushed the final backstretch to move up on Chesire. Passing on the inside with just over 200 to go, Cacho accelerated and was surprised Chesire was not able to mount a challenge. Charging out into a big lead around the turn, Cacho kept looking back for the next challenger, but there was none, Cacho and the Spanish fans celebrated. Even with his celebrating and looking back, Cacho's last lap was about 50.5. Mohamed Suleiman edged past a fading Chesire and a final sprint around the outside from eighth place netted Rachid El Basir the silver. Suleiman earned the first Olympic medal for Qatar. Cacho's winning time was the slowest winning time for the Olympic 1500m final since 1956, the last time that the winner had failed to break 3.40: moreover, the final was so much slower than either semi-final, or all but one of the heats, that the winning time in the final would have failed to even qualify as a fastest loser from the earlier rounds. In fact, Suleiman in the second semi-final had the distinction of running the fastest time in the competition, with Cacho narrowly behind, both men a good six seconds quicker than their efforts in the final.

== Background ==
This was the 22nd appearance of the event, which is one of 12 athletics events to have been held at every Summer Olympics. Four finalists from 1988 returned: bronze medalist Jens-Peter Herold of East Germany (now Germany), eighth-place finisher Marcus O'Sullivan of Ireland, ninth-place finisher Mário Silva of Portugal, and eleventh-place finisher Joseph Chesire of Kenya. The favorite was Noureddine Morceli of Algeria, who had recently won the first of what would be three consecutive world championships.

Belize, the Central African Republic, Croatia, Guinea, Laos, Lebanon, Swaziland, Vanuatu, unified Yemen (North Yemen had competed previously), and Zaire each made their first appearance in the event; the Unified Team of some former Soviet republics competed in this event in the team's only Summer Games appearance. The United States made its 21st appearance, most for any nation (having missed only the boycotted 1980 Games).

== Competition format ==
The competition was again three rounds (used previously in 1952 and since 1964). The "fastest loser" system introduced in 1964 was used for both the first round and semifinals. The 12-man semifinals and finals introduced in 1984 were used (abandoning the short-lived 13-runner semifinal heats from 1988, though one semifinal ended up having 13 anyway).

There were four heats in the first round, each with 12 or 13 runners. The top five runners in each heat, along with the next four fastest overall, advanced to the semifinals. The 24 semifinalists were divided into two semifinals, each with 12 runners. Momodou Bello N'Jie of The Gambia was placed directly in a semifinal, making a 13th runner in that semifinal. The top five men in each semifinal, plus the next two fastest overall, advanced to the 12-man final.

== Records ==
These were the standing world and Olympic records prior to the 1992 Summer Olympics.

World record	Saïd Aouita (MAR)	3:29.46	West Berlin, West Germany	23 August 1985
Olympic record	Sebastian Coe (GBR)	3:32.53	Los Angeles, United States	11 August 1984

No new world or Olympic records were set during the competition. The following national records were established during the competition:

Nation	Athlete	Round	Time
Laos	Khambieng Khamiar	Heat 1	4:04.82
Angola	João N'Tyamba	Heat 2	3:39.54

== Schedule ==
All times are Central European Summer Time (UTC+2)

Date	Time	Round
Monday, 3 August 1992	11:15	Round 1
Thursday, 6 August 1992	19:45	Semifinals
Saturday, 8 August 1992	20:15	Final

== Results ==
=== Round 1 ===
==== Heat 1 ====
Rank	Athlete	Nation	Time	Notes
1	Fermín Cacho	Spain	3:37.04	Q
2	Phillimon Hanneck	Zimbabwe	3:37.65	Q
3	Jim Spivey	United States	3:38.01	Q
4	Rachid El Basir	Morocco	3:38.01	Q
5	Jonah Birir	Kenya	3:38.29	Q
6	Azat Rakipau	Unified Team	3:38.64	q
7	Edgar Martins	Brazil	3:38.68	q
8	Kim Bong-yu	South Korea	3:40.73	
9	Steve Crabb	Great Britain	3:41.00	
10	Mohamed Al-Nahdi	United Arab Emirates	3:48.08	
11	Zacharia Maidjida	Central African Republic	3:55.72	
12	Khambieng Khamiar	Laos	4:04.82	NR
13	Ancel Nalau	Vanuatu	4:13.88	

==== Heat 2 ====
Rank	Athlete	Nation	Time	Notes
1	Noureddine Morceli	Algeria	3:37.98	Q
2	Steve Holman	United States	3:38.38	Q
3	Mário Silva	Portugal	3:38.57	Q
4	Zeki Öztürk	Turkey	3:38.68	Q
5	Matthew Yates	Great Britain	3:38.73	Q
6	Hauke Fuhlbrügge	Germany	3:38.92	q
7	João N'Tyamba	Angola	3:39.54	NR
8	Metiku Megersa	Ethiopia	3:41.54	
9	Khan Nadir	Pakistan	3:44.96	
10	Markus Hacksteiner	Switzerland	3:45.27	
11	Awad Salah Nasser	Yemen	3:51.89	
12	Tamimou Idrissou	Benin	3:56.45	
13	Alphonse Munyeshyaka	Rwanda	3:58.75	

==== Heat 3 ====
Rank	Athlete	Nation	Time	Notes
1	Joseph Chesire	Kenya	3:44.06	Q
2	Graham Hood	Canada	3:44.44	Q
3	Branko Zorko	Croatia	3:44.47	Q
4	Gennaro di Napoli	Italy	3:44.55	Q
5	Rüdiger Stenzel	Germany	3:44.70	Q
6	Terrance Herrington	United States	3:44.80	
7	José Luis González	Spain	3:46.75	
8	Bobby Gaseitsiwe	Botswana	3:48.33	
9	Mohamed Sy Savane	Guinea	3:51.96	
10	Reuben Appleton	Antigua and Barbuda	4:02.99	
11	Bassam Kawas	Lebanon	4:17.40	
—	Ian Gray	Belize	DNF	
—	Saïd Aouita	Morocco	DNS	

==== Heat 4 ====
Rank	Athlete	Nation	Time	Notes
1	David Kibet	Kenya	3:36.32	Q
2	Mohamed Suleiman	Qatar	3:36.72	Q
3	Jens-Peter Herold	Germany	3:36.76	Q
4	Marcus O'Sullivan	Ireland	3:37.07	Q
5	Kevin McKay	Great Britain	3:37.39	Q
6	Manuel Pancorbo	Spain	3:37.62	q
7	Houssein Djama Egueh	Djibouti	3:44.13	
8	Sipho Dlamini	Swaziland	3:46.33	
9	Hailu Zewde	Ethiopia	3:47.79	
10	Kaleka Mutoke	Zaire	3:53.71	
11	Bernardo Elonga	Equatorial Guinea	4:25.78	
—	Robin van Helden	Netherlands	DNF	

=== Semifinals ===
==== Semifinal 1 ====
Rank	Athlete	Nation	Time	Notes
1	Noureddine Morceli	Algeria	3:39.22	Q
2	Rachid El Basir	Morocco	3:39.26	Q
3	Joseph Chesire	Kenya	3:39.43	Q
4	Manuel Pancorbo	Spain	3:39.52	Q
5	Jens-Peter Herold	Germany	3:39.55	Q
6	Gennaro di Napoli	Italy	3:39.56	
7	Branko Zorko	Croatia	3:39.71	
8	Rüdiger Stenzel	Germany	3:40.23	
9	Steve Holman	United States	3:40.49	
10	Kevin McKay	Great Britain	3:40.80	
11	Zeki Öztürk	Turkey	3:41.98	
12	Edgar Martins	Brazil	3:42.53	
13	Momodou Bello N'Jie	The Gambia	4:13.52	

==== Semifinal 2 ====
Rank	Athlete	Nation	Time	Notes
1	Mohamed Suleiman	Qatar	3:34.77	Q
2	Fermín Cacho	Spain	3:34.93	Q
3	Jonah Birir	Kenya	3:35.41	Q
4	Jim Spivey	United States	3:35.55	Q
5	David Kibet	Kenya	3:35.82	Q
6	Graham Hood	Canada	3:36.12	q
7	Azat Rakipau	Unified Team	3:36.16	q
8	Marcus O'Sullivan	Ireland	3:37.16	
9	Mário Silva	Portugal	3:38.09	
10	Phillimon Hanneck	Zimbabwe	3:38.09	
11	Hauke Fuhlbrügge	Germany	3:38.45	
12	Matthew Yates	Great Britain	3:40.53	

=== Final ===
The final was held on August 8, 1992.

Rank	Athlete	Nation	Time
1st place, gold medalist(s)	Fermín Cacho	Spain	3:40.12
2nd place, silver medalist(s)	Rachid El Basir	Morocco	3:40.62
3rd place, bronze medalist(s)	Mohamed Suleiman	Qatar	3:40.69
4	Joseph Chesire	Kenya	3:41.12
5	Jonah Birir	Kenya	3:41.27
6	Jens-Peter Herold	Germany	3:41.53
7	Noureddine Morceli	Algeria	3:41.70
8	Jim Spivey	United States	3:41.74
9	Graham Hood	Canada	3:42.55
10	David Kibet	Kenya	3:42.62
11	Manuel Pancorbo	Spain	3:43.51
12	Azat Rakipau	Unified Team	3:44.66

== See also ==
- 1990 Men's European Championships 1500 metres (Split)
- 1991 Men's World Championships 1500 metres (Tokyo)
- 1993 Men's World Championships 1500 metres (Stuttgart)
- 1994 Men's European Championships 1500 metres (Helsinki)
