= Athletics at the 1987 Pan American Games – Men's 1500 metres =

Men's 1500 metres at the Pan American Games

The men's 1500 metres event at the 1987 Pan American Games was held in Indianapolis, United States on 12 August.

== Results ==
Rank	Name	Nationality	Time	Notes
1st place, gold medalist(s)	Joaquim Cruz	Brazil	3:47.34	
2nd place, silver medalist(s)	Jim Spivey	United States	3:47.46	
3rd place, bronze medalist(s)	Steve Scott	United States	3:47.76	
4	David Campbell	Canada	3:48.77	
5	Dave Reid	Canada	3:49.25	
6	Mauricio González	Mexico	3:50.01	
7	Michael Watson	Bermuda	3:51.55	
8	Rafael Martínez	Mexico	3:52.15	
9	Carlos Quiñones	Puerto Rico	3:53.46	
10	Francisco Figueredo	Paraguay	3:54.91	
11	Dale Jones	Antigua and Barbuda	3:55.08	
	Mitchell Browne	Antigua and Barbuda	DNS	
