= 1990 European Athletics Championships – Men's 1500 metres =

Men's 1500 metres at the European Athletics Championships

These are the official results of the Men's 1500 metres event at the 1990 European Championships in Split, Yugoslavia, held at Stadion Poljud on 30 August and 1 September 1990.

== Medalists ==
Gold	Jens-Peter Herold; East Germany
Silver	Gennaro Di Napoli; Italy
Bronze	Mário Silva; Portugal

== Final ==
Rank	Final	Time
	Jens-Peter Herold (GDR)	3:38.35
	Gennaro di Napoli (ITA)	3:38.60
	Mario Silva (POR)	3:38.73
4.	Peter Elliott (GBR)	3:39.07
5.	Steve Cram (GBR)	3:39.08
6.	José Luis González (ESP)	3:39.15
7.	Han Kulker (NED)	3:39.85
8.	Markus Hacksteiner (SUI)	3:40.44
9.	Neil Horsfield (GBR)	3:40.59
10.	Marc Corstjens (BEL)	3:41.31
11.	Fermín Cacho (ESP)	3:42.21
12.	Mogens Guldberg (DEN)	3:42.76
13.	Robin van Helden (NED)	3:46.13

== Heats ==
Rank	Heat 1	Time
1.	José Luis González (ESP)	3:38.75
2.	Markus Hacksteiner (SUI)	3:38.94
3.	Fermín Cacho (ESP)	3:39.22
4.	Gennaro di Napoli (ITA)	3:39.25
5.	Steve Cram (GBR)	3:39.93
6.	Robin van Helden (NED)	3:40.61
7.	Mogens Guldberg (DEN)	3:40.71
8.	Jari Venäläinen (FIN)	3:41.23
9.	Vladimir Kolpakov (URS)	3:41.64
9.	Christophe Impens (BEL)	3:41.64
11.	Éric Dubus (FRA)	3:44.47
—	Peter Elliott (GBR)	DNF^{†}
—	Hauke Fuhlbrügge (GDR)	DQ^{†}

^{†}: Peter Elliott from the United Kingdom fell after having been pushed by East German Hauke Fuhlbrügge and did not finish the race. The East German was disqualified. After protests of the British officials, Elliott was admitted to run in the final. The decision was a precedent case and not without controversy.

Rank	Heat 2	Time
1.	Jens-Peter Herold (GDR)	3:39.63
2.	Mario Silva (POR)	3:39.91
3.	Neil Horsfield (GBR)	3:39.97
4.	Han Kulker (NED)	3:40.02
5.	Marc Corstjens (BEL)	3:40.30
6.	Hervé Phélippeau (FRA)	3:40.72
7.	Branko Zorko (YUG)	3:40.86
8.	Teófilo Benito (ESP)	3:40.99
9.	Lars Bøgh (DEN)	3:41.12
10.	Davide Tirelli (ITA)	3:43.76
11.	Philippe Collard (FRA)	3:46.39
12.	Eckhard Rüter (FRG)	3:48.51
—	Miroslav Chochkov (BUL)	DNF
—	Alex Geissbühler (SUI)	DNF

== Participation ==
According to an unofficial count, 27 athletes from 15 countries participated in the event.

- Belgium (2)
- Bulgaria (1)
- Denmark (2)
- East Germany (2)
- Finland (1)
- France (3)
- Italy (2)
- Netherlands (2)
- Portugal (1)
- Soviet Union (1)
- Spain (3)
- Switzerland (2)
- United Kingdom (3)
- West Germany (1)
- Yugoslavia (1)

== See also ==
- 1988 Men's Olympic 1500 metres (Seoul)
- 1991 Men's World Championships 1500 metres (Tokyo)
- 1992 Men's Olympic 1500 metres (Barcelona)
