= Athletics at the 1985 Summer Universiade – Men's 1500 metres =

The men's 1500 metres event at the 1985 Summer Universiade was held at the Kobe Universiade Memorial Stadium in Kobe on 30 and 31 August 1985.

== Medalists ==
| Gold | Silver | Bronze |
|---|---|---|
| Chris McGeorge; Great Britain | Adam Dixon; United States | Dragan Zdravković; Yugoslavia |

== Results ==
=== Heats ===
| Rank | Heat | Athlete | Nationality | Time | Notes |
|---|---|---|---|---|---|
| 1 | 3 | Stefano Mei | Italy | 3:43.23 | Q |
| 2 | 3 | Anatoliy Legeda | Soviet Union | 3:43.46 | Q |
| 3 | 3 | Adam Dixon | United States | 3:43.54 | Q |
| 4 | 3 | João Campos | Portugal | 3:43.86 | q |
| 5 | 3 | Dave Reid | Canada | 3:43.89 | q |
| 6 | 2 | Jürgen Grothe | West Germany | 3:44.37 | Q |
| 7 | 2 | Chris McGeorge | Great Britain | 3:44.62 | Q |
| 8 | 2 | Dragan Zdravković | Yugoslavia | 3:44.64 | Q |
| 9 | 2 | Andrés Vera | Spain | 3:44.79 | q |
| 10 | 1 | David Campbell | Canada | 3:46.13 | Q |
| 11 | 2 | Sebastien Wschiansky | Switzerland | 3:46.15 | |
| 12 | 1 | Anatoliy Kalutskiy | Soviet Union | 3:46.23 | Q |
| 13 | 2 | Roberto López | Mexico | 3:46.35 | |
| 14 | 1 | Petru Drăgoescu | Romania | 3:46.41 | Q |
| 15 | 1 | Mustapha Lachaal | Morocco | 3:46.87 | |
| 16 | 3 | Rob Harrison | Great Britain | 3:47.01 | |
| 17 | 2 | Yasushi Kano | Japan | 3:47.27 | |
| 18 | 1 | Terry Brahm | United States | 3:47.35 | |
| 19 | 1 | Antonio Selvaggio | Italy | 3:47.69 | |
| 20 | 1 | Rachid Kram | Algeria | 3:48.45 | |
| 21 | 1 | Manuel Balmaceda | Chile | 3:51.97 | |
| 22 | 1 | Joaquim Silva | Portugal | 3:52.29 | |
| 23 | 3 | Manuel López | Spain | 3:53.32 | |
| 24 | 3 | Hugo Allan García | Guatemala | 3:53.50 | |
| 25 | 1 | Kouji Kimura | Japan | 3:53.53 | |
| 26 | 2 | Philippos Stylianoudis | Cyprus | 3:59.58 | |
| 27 | 2 | Thierry Payet | Seychelles | 4:05.95 | |
| 28 | 3 | Manuel Miranda | Bolivia | 4:08.66 | |
| 29 | 1 | John Siguria | Papua New Guinea | 4:12.63 | |
| 30 | 1 | José Mayorga | Nicaragua | 4:15.05 | |
| 31 | 2 | Byron Vargas | Honduras | 4:21.46 | |
| 32 | 2 | M. Luveniyali | Fiji | 5:00.73 | |

=== Final ===
| Rank | Athlete | Nationality | Time | Notes |
|---|---|---|---|---|
| 1st place, gold medalist(s) | Chris McGeorge | Great Britain | 3:46.22 | |
| 2nd place, silver medalist(s) | Adam Dixon | United States | 3:46.29 | |
| 3rd place, bronze medalist(s) | Dragan Zdravković | Yugoslavia | 3:46.78 | |
| 4 | Anatoliy Legeda | Soviet Union | 3:46.79 | |
| 5 | David Campbell | Canada | 3:49.11 | |
| 6 | Anatoliy Kalutskiy | Soviet Union | 3:47.40 | |
| 7 | Stefano Mei | Italy | 3:48.20 | |
| 8 | Petru Drăgoescu | Romania | 3:48.66 | |
| 9 | João Campos | Portugal | 3:49.09 | |
| 10 | Jürgen Grothe | West Germany | 3:49.34 | |
| 11 | Dave Reid | Canada | 3:50.23 | |
| 12 | Andrés Vera | Spain | 3:52.02 | |
