= Athletics at the 1986 Commonwealth Games – Men's 1500 metres =

Men's 1500 metres at the 1986 Commonwealth Games
- Venue: Meadowbank Stadium
- Dates: 1-2 August

The men's 1500 metres event at the 1986 Commonwealth Games was held on 1 and 2 August at the Meadowbank Stadium in Edinburgh.

== Medalists ==
Gold	Silver	Bronze
Steve Cram; England	John Gladwin; England	Dave Campbell; Canada

== Results ==
=== Heats ===
There were two heats of twelve runners.

Qualification: First 4 of each heat (Q) and the next 2 fastest (q) qualified for the final.

Rank	Heat	Name	Nationality	Time	Notes
1	2	Rob Harrison	England	3:42.69	Q
2	2	Mike Hillardt	Australia	3:42.76	Q
3	2	Neil Horsfield	Wales	3:42.83	Q
4	2	Pat Scammell	Australia	3:42.92	Q
5	2	Steve Martin	Northern Ireland	3:43.05	q
6	2	John Robson	Scotland	3:43.21	q
7	2	Rob Lonergan	Canada	3:43.48	
8	1	Steve Cram	England	3:43.98	Q
9	1	John Gladwin	England	3:44.45	Q
10	1	Peter Bourke	Australia	3:44.77	Q
11	1	David Campbell	Canada	3:44.78	Q
12	1	Alistair Currie	Scotland	3:44.82	
13	1	Mike Gilchrist	New Zealand	3:45.91	
14	2	Mbiganyi Thee	Botswana	3:46.13	
15	1	Simon Hoogewerf	Canada	3:46.80	
16	2	Peter Renner	New Zealand	3:47.06	
17	1	Mark Kirk	Northern Ireland	3:47.65	
18	2	Isaac Ganunga	Malawi	3:50.13	
19	1	Gideon Mthembu	Swaziland	3:50.16	
20	1	Tom Hanlon	Scotland	3:50.57	
21	2	Nick Hand	Guernsey	3:50.75	
22	1	Thabiso Moqhali	Lesotho	3:52.31	
23	1	George Mambosasa	Malawi	3:54.15	
24	2	Binesh Prasad	Fiji	4:04.27	

=== Final ===
Rank	Name	Nationality	Time	Notes
1st place, gold medalist(s)	Steve Cram	England	3:50.87	
2nd place, silver medalist(s)	John Gladwin	England	3:52.17	
3rd place, bronze medalist(s)	David Campbell	Canada	3:54.06	
4	Rob Harrison	England	3:54.44	
5	Peter Bourke	Australia	3:54.48	
6	Pat Scammell	Australia	3:55.28	
7	Steve Martin	Northern Ireland	3:55.42	
8	Mike Hillardt	Australia	3:56.90	
9	Neil Horsfield	Wales	3:57.08	
10	John Robson	Scotland	3:57.20	
