= Athletics at the 1989 Summer Universiade – Men's 1500 metres =

The men's 1500 metres event at the 1989 Summer Universiade was held at the Wedaustadion in Duisburg on 28 and 30 August 1989.

== Medalists ==
Gold	Silver	Bronze
Kip Cheruiyot; Kenya	Peter Rono; Kenya	Bob Dielis; Netherlands

== Results ==
=== Heats ===
Rank	Heat	Athlete	Nationality	Time	Notes
1	1	Eckhardt Rüter	West Germany	3:43.06	Q
2	1	Noureddine Morceli	Algeria	3:43.27	Q
3	1	Kai Jenkel	Switzerland	3:43.52	Q
4	1	Mitsuhiro Okuyama	Japan	3:43.76	q
5	1	Marc Corstjens	Belgium	3:44.39	q
6	3	Kip Cheruiyot	Kenya	3:44.61	Q
7	1	Mohamed Suleiman	Qatar	3:44.81	q
8	3	Bob Dielis	Netherlands	3:45.19	Q
9	3	Jari Venäläinen	Finland	3:45.49	Q
10	3	Chris McGeorge	Great Britain	3:45.79	
11	3	Karl Blaha	Austria	3:46.16	
12	3	Terrance Herrington	United States	3:46.27	
13	1	Pedro Rocha	Portugal	3:46.79	
14	1	Branko Zorko	Yugoslavia	3:48.42	
15	2	Peter Rono	Kenya	3:48.49	Q
16	2	Milan Drahoňovský	Czechoslovakia	3:48.92	Q
17	2	Brendan Matthias	Canada	3:49.05	Q
18	2	Tim Hacker	United States	3:49.06	
19	2	Davide Tirelli	Italy	3:49.53	
20	2	David Heath	Great Britain	3:49.64	
21	2	Ronnie Maoz	Israel	3:49.96	
22	2	Ove Talsnes	Norway	3:50.91	
23	2	Stefan Plätzer	West Germany	3:50.92	
24	3	Isidro Rodríguez	Mexico	3:52.93	
25	2	Abdikader Omer	Somalia	3:57.42	
26	2	Andreas Christodoulou	Cyprus	3:57.79	
27	3	Luis Martínez	Guatemala	3:57.99	
28	2	Sergey Melnikov	Soviet Union	3:58.27	
29	1	Mohamed Sy Savané	Guinea	4:02.22	
30	1	Faha Sy	Mauritania	4:45.78	
	3	Dov Kremer	Israel	DNF	
	3	Miroslav Chochkov	Bulgaria	DNF	

=== Final ===
Rank	Athlete	Nationality	Time	Notes
1st place, gold medalist(s)	Kip Cheruiyot	Kenya	3:40.38	
2nd place, silver medalist(s)	Peter Rono	Kenya	3:40.79	
3rd place, bronze medalist(s)	Bob Dielis	Netherlands	3:40.93	
4	Kai Jenkel	Switzerland	3:41.01	
5	Milan Drahoňovský	Czechoslovakia	3:41.03	
6	Jari Venäläinen	Finland	3:41.88	
7	Noureddine Morceli	Algeria	3:41.99	
8	Mohamed Suleiman	Qatar	3:42.12	
9	Marc Corstjens	Belgium	3:42.64	
10	Brendan Matthias	Canada	3:47.13	
11	Mitsuhiro Okuyama	Japan	3:47.92	
	Eckhardt Rüter	West Germany	DNF	
