= Megersa =

Megersa is a surname. Notable people with the surname include:

- Asrat Megersa (born 1987), Ethiopian footballer
- Lemma Megersa (born 1970), Ethiopian politician
- Metiku Megersa (born 1973), Ethiopian middle-distance runner
