= Luis Núñez =

Luis Núñez or Luis Nuñez may refer to:

- Luis Núñez (athlete) (born 1964), Dominican Republic athlete
- Luis Núñez (footballer, born May 1980), Paraguayan footballer for Sportivo Luqueño
- Luis Núñez (footballer, born 1983), Colombian footballer for Boyacá Chicó
- Luis Núñez Astrain (1931–2009), Spanish-Basque linguist and sociologist, editor of the newspaper Egin
- Luis Patricio Núñez (born January 1980), former Chilean footballer
