= Speedgolf =

Variant of golf

Speedgolf (also known as extreme golf, fast golf, fitness golf and hit and run golf) is a variant of golf which scores both on strokes played and the time taken to complete the round.

== Rules ==
One stroke is scored equally to one minute, so that shooting 90 on a golf course in 59 minutes and 30 seconds would result in an overall speed golf score of 149:30.

Rules and etiquette are generally the same for speedgolf and regular golf with minor exceptions.

- In the interest of time, a golfer is allowed to putt with the flagstick left in the hole. Note: As of January 1, 2019, a golfer is allowed to putt with the flagstick left in the hole in regular golf, also.
- Unless otherwise told by a tournament committee, speedgolfers are expected to rake bunkers, fix ball marks and conform to normal golf course dress code, although most speedgolfers will wear running shoes instead of golf shoes.
- In the case of a lost ball or one that is hit out of bounds, players are permitted to play it like a lateral hazard because it was thought to be too severe of a penalty to have to also be penalized the additional time to run back to where the original shot was played.

Aside from the normal 14-club maximum, there is no rule about how many clubs a player is allowed to bring. However, players typically carry 4–7 clubs.

== History ==
The sport was believed to have been started in 1979 in California when former American record holder in the mile (3:47.69 in 1982) Steve Scott ran around a golf course in 29 minutes and 33 seconds shooting a 95 with only a 3-iron.

After hearing about Scott, former ironman triathlete and teaching pro Jay Larson became the person who many considered the top speedgolfer of the 1990s. Larson once shot a 75 in 39 minutes and 9 seconds on a 6,500 course with a slope rating of 125 (using the old rules of speedgolf where the player could have a caddy in a cart riding out in front of them carrying their clubs and calling out distances as they approached the ball).

Towards the end of the 1990s, in an effort to help promote the sport, Oregonians and speedgolfers Tim Scott (a former teaching pro turned school teacher), Christopher Smith, and Jim Kosciolek (a Chicago-based lawyer) founded a company called Speed Golf International.

The sport is now played in North America, Europe and Japan, and major tournaments are telecast by channels such as ESPN, CBS, and The Golf Channel.

Since 2018, the International Speedgolf Alliance (ISGA) has served as the global governing body for the sport of Speedgolf. Founded by Scott Dawley, the ISGA coordinates international efforts to promote and standardize the sport. One of the primary reference sources for information about global Speedgolf is PlaySpeedgolf.com, which also includes official ISGA updates and resources.

At its inception, the ISGA included national Speedgolf organizations from the United States, Japan, New Zealand, Australia, and the United Kingdom. Finland joined the alliance in 2019, followed by France, Sweden, Ireland, and Belgium in 2024.

To foster a unified global identity, ISGA members have adopted the single-word spelling "Speedgolf" for all official communications and promotional materials.

In 2024, the Speedgolf World Championship was held outside the United States for the first time, with Japan serving as the host nation. Future editions of the championship, branded as Worlds Week Speedgolf, are scheduled to take place in New Zealand (2026) and the United Kingdom (2028).

Additionally, 2025 will mark the launch of the European Speedgolf Open, hosted in Helsinki, Finland. This event is intended to become a biennial tournament, rotating among ISGA-affiliated European countries.

== Tournaments ==
The oldest known speedgolf tournament is the Bob-n-Broc', which has been held each September in Minneapolis since 1998.

Throughout the 2000s, there were various competitions held throughout the United States, many of which were held at Bandon Dunes in Bandon, Oregon.

=== World championships ===
2012 – Inaugural World Championships

The inaugural Speed Golf World Championships were held October 20–21, 2012, at Bandon Dunes Golf Resort in Bandon, Oregon, on the Old MacDonald Course (October 20) and the Bandon Dunes Course (October 21).

Results in the Pro/Elite division were as follows for the 15 professionals competing for the $50,000 purse:

1. Chris Walker, 263:28 (77-53:29; 76-56:29)
2. Tim Scott, 264:47 (81-52:21; 80-51:26)
3. Tim Hval, 266:20 (74-59:33; 74-58:47)
4. Christopher Smith, 268:24 (73-58:33; 78-58:51)
5. Jaacob Bowden, 270:18 (75-61:06; 78-56:12)
6. Todd Killingsworth, 272:39 (86-56:24; 75-55:15)
7. Robert Hogan, 272:39 (94-44:00; 92-43:05)
8. Gretchen Johnson(am), 273:38 (84-55:19; 79-55:19)
9. Michael Chupka Jr., 274:26 (79-63:00; 75-57:26)
10. Kris Moe, 279:11 (72-64:24; 80-62:47)
11. Jeff Simonds, 280:30 (80-58:08; 84-58:22)
12. Arno Lindsberger, 288:53 (99-48:37; 100-41:16)
13. Brandon Carter, 291:25 (85-64:14; 82-60:11)
14. Kyle Warren, 304:15 (79-67:41; 83-74:34)
15. Paul Gorman, 310:42 (89-70:39; 85-66:03)

There was also a group of 45 amateurs who competed in a one-day-only competition on October 21 on the Bandon Dunes Course. The amateur division featured various age groups that included 24 and under, 25–39, 40–49, and 50 and over.

A 30-minute special about the World Championships aired on CBS before the third round of the 2013 Masters.

2013

It was held on October 26–27, 2013, at Bandon Dunes Golf Resort in Bandon, Oregon, on the Old MacDonald Course (October 26) and the Bandon Dunes Course (October 27).

Results in the Pro/Elite division were as follows:

1. Rob Hogan, 236.55 (77-39:31; 79-41:24)
2. Eri Crum, 242.34 (80-45:03; 73-44:31)
3. Matt Dehlin, 250.06 (78-46:06; 78-48:00)
4. Chris Walker, 250.38 (74-52:26; 73-51:12)
5. Scott Dawley, 253.39 (77-51:43; 74-50:56)
6. Scott Manley, 256.37 (80-50:25; 78-48:12)
7. Allan Phillips, 257.19 (84-48:10; 80-45:09)
8. Christopher Smith, 263.58 (78-58:29; 72-55:29)
9. David Denyer, 264.15 (78-54:39; 76-55:36)
10. Tim Hval, 265.42 (81-54:49; 77-52:53)
11. Jamie Young, 268.02 (85-48:04; 85-49:58)
12. Pete Phipps, 269.06 (83-52:27; 79-54:39)
13. Nick Willis, 270.27 (86-44:20; 97-43:07)
14. Jaacob Bowden, 271.42 (85–59; 72-55:42)
15. David Marshall, 272.17 (84-54:27; 82-51:50)
16. Tim Scott, 272.57 (83–50.34; 85-54:23)
17. Scott Gerweck, 274.11 (88-50:04; 85-51:07)
18. Larry Levinson, 274.29 (80–60; 76-58:29)
19. Shanon Hoyt, 274.45 (87–50.27; 83-54:18)
20. Paul Kivela, 276.26 (92-51:28; 85-47:58)
21. Ralph Reahard, 283.35 (78-66:05; 75-64:30)
22. Karl Meltzer, 284.07 (89-55:11; 89-50:56)
23. Dougal Williams, 286.51 (95-54:16; 84-53:35)
24. Bernard Lagat, 324.04 (118-48:26; 110-47:38)
25. Jay Larson W/D (89–58.05; W/D-W/D)

=== Eastern Speedgolf Open ===
The Eastern Speedgolf Open was held at The Foundry Golf Club in Powhatan, Virginia, on June 30, 2013. Professional competitors played for a purse of $35,000. The event was preceded by A First Tee competition (9-hole par 3 course) and an amateur tournament.

Name Total Strokes - Minutes

1. Rob Hogan 129.58 (85 - 44:58)
2. Allan Philips 133.18 (83 - 50:18)
3. Tim Scott 135.45 (77 - 58:45)
4. Chris Walker 139.34 (81 - 58:34)
5. Christopher Smith 140.55 (75 - 65:55)
6. Scott Dawley 142.25 (81 - 61:25)
7. Ralph Reahard 145.06 (77 - 68:06)
8. Todd Killingsworth 148.02 (82 - 66:02)
9. Shannon Hoyt 148.45 (96 - 52:45)
10. Jaacob Bowden 150.25 (81 - 69:25)
11. Michael Chupka Jr. 152.53 (84 - 68:53)
12. Nathan Ward 155.08 (88 - 67:08)
13. Mike Aldrich 156.08 (85 - 71:08)
14. Adam Smith 168.36 (88 - 80:36)

== Guinness world record ==
The lowest score in competition was shot by Mitch Williamson of Orange in New South Wales shot a score of 77 in 31 minutes, giving him a Speedgolf score of 108 at the Yarra Bend Golf Club in Melbourne hosted the Australian Speedgolf Open on 29 August 2016. This was not an official Guinness World record because Guinness was not onsite to validate it as a world record.

The official Guinness record was shot by professional Christopher Smith at the Chicago Speedgolf Classic at Jackson Park Golf Course on October 16, 2005. Smith shot 65 in just 44:06 while carrying six clubs for a speed golf score of 109:06.

== Related sports ==
Speed golf is sometimes contrasted with Cross-country BigBall, in which players use soccer balls and baseball bats to reach a goal. Because the course and goals are chosen by the participants, Cross-country BigBall etiquette varies depending on whether the theater is a wooded or residential area. Both sports require substantial physical stamina.

Speed disc golf is similar in concept and rules to speed golf.

The biathlon (skiing and shooting a rifle) is also sometimes compared to speed golf.
