= Douglas Consiglio =

Canadian middle-distance runner

Personal information
- Born: 10 January 1964 (age 62) Toronto, Ontario, Canada

Sport
- Sport: Middle-distance running
- Event: 1500 metres

Douglas Consiglio (born 10 January 1964) is a Canadian middle-distance runner. He competed in the men's 1500 metres at the 1988 Summer Olympics.

Consiglio competed for the Arkansas Razorbacks track and field team in the NCAA.
