= 2000 Asian Athletics Championships – Men's 1500 metres =

The men's 1500 metres event at the 2000 Asian Athletics Championships was held in Jakarta, Indonesia on 28–30 August.

== Medalists ==
| Gold | Silver | Bronze |
|---|---|---|
| Mohamed Suleiman; Qatar | Abubaker Ali Kamal; Qatar | Sun Wenli; China |

== Results ==
=== Heats ===
| Rank | Heat | Name | Nationality | Time | Notes |
|---|---|---|---|---|---|
| 1 | 1 | Mohamed Suleiman | Qatar | 3:51.13 | Q |
| 2 | 1 | Lee Du-Haeng | South Korea | 3:52.81 | Q |
| 3 | 1 | Sun Wenli | China | 3:53.03 | Q |
| 4 | 1 | Bahadur Prasad | India | 3:53.15 | Q |
| 5 | 2 | Kazuyoshi Tokumoto | Japan | 3:53.46 | Q |
| 6 | 1 | Ahmad Yazdanian | Iran | 3:53.76 | Q |
| 7 | 1 | Rajendra Bahadur Bhandari | Nepal | 3:53.93 | q |
| 8 | 2 | Osman Mohamed Osman | Saudi Arabia | 3:54.46 | Q |
| 9 | 2 | Abubaker Ali Kamal | Qatar | 3:54.49 | Q |
| 10 | 2 | Park Ho-Min | South Korea | 3:56.21 | Q |
| 11 | 1 | John Lozada | Philippines | 3:56.61 | q |
| 12 | 2 | Chamkaur Singh | Singapore | 3:56.83 | Q |
| 13 | 2 | Gao Shuai | China | 3:59.18 | |
| 14 | 1 | Talal Khalfan Al-Muharbi | Oman | 3:59.30 | |
| 15 | 1 | Redouane Jadouh | Syria | 4:02.05 | |
| 16 | 2 | Han Samnang | Cambodia | 4:30.40 | |
| 17 | 2 | Leh Phosanith | Laos | 4:37.25 | |

=== Final ===
| Rank | Name | Nationality | Time | Notes |
|---|---|---|---|---|
| 1st place, gold medalist(s) | Mohamed Suleiman | Qatar | 3:52.47 | |
| 2nd place, silver medalist(s) | Abubaker Ali Kamal | Qatar | 3:52.64 | |
| 3rd place, bronze medalist(s) | Sun Wenli | China | 3:52.94 | |
| 4 | Lee Du-Haeng | South Korea | 3:53.85 | |
| 5 | Kazuyoshi Tokumoto | Japan | 3:54.48 | |
| 6 | Osman Mohamed Osman | Saudi Arabia | 3:55.98 | |
| 7 | Bahadur Prasad | India | 3:57.00 | |
| 8 | John Lozada | Philippines | 3:57.49 | |
| 9 | Ahmad Yazdanian | Iran | 3:58.18 | |
| 10 | Park Ho-Min | South Korea | 3:58.67 | |
| 11 | Rajendra Bahadur Bhandari | Nepal | 3:59.91 | |
| 12 | Chamkaur Singh | Singapore | 4:02.00 | |
