= Marcus Rapp =

Swiss middle-distance runner

Personal information
- Nationality: Swiss
- Born: 23 September 1957 (age 68) Bellinzona
- Height: 180 cm (5 ft 11 in)
- Weight: 69 kg (152 lb)

Sport
- Country: Switzerland
- Sport: Middle-distance running

Marcus Rapp is a Swiss Olympic middle-distance runner. He represented his country in the men's 1500 meters at the 1992 Summer Olympics. His time was a 3:42.64 in the first heat.
