= Jo Jin-Saeng =

South Korean runner (born 1965)

Personal information
- Nationality: South Korean
- Born: February 23, 1965 (age 61) South Korea
- Height: 176 cm (5 ft 9 in)
- Weight: 64 kg (141 lb)

Korean name
- Hangul: 조진생
- Hanja: 趙鎭生
- RR: Jo Jinsaeng
- MR: Cho Chinsaeng

Sport
- Country: South Korea
- Sport: Middle-distance running

Jo Jin-Saeng (born February 23, 1965) is a South Korean Olympic middle-distance runner. He represented his country in the men's 1500 meters and the men's 4 x 400 meters relay at the 1988 Summer Olympics. His time was a 3:45.63 in the 1500, and a 3:14.71 in the 4 x 400 relay.

Jo is the youngest of six children. His father Jo Pan-geum was a farmer. He attended North Jeolla Sports High School.
