= Abdelmajide Moncif =

Moroccan middle-distance runner

Personal information
- Nationality: Moroccan
- Born: 10 May 1961 (age 65) Morocco
- Height: 182 cm (6 ft 0 in)
- Weight: 68 kg (150 lb)

Sport
- Country: Morocco
- Sport: Middle-distance running

Abdel Majid Moncef (born 10 May 1961) is a Moroccan Olympic middle-distance runner. He represented his country in the men's 1500 meters at the 1992 Summer Olympics. His time was a 3:41.73 in the first heat, and a DNF in the semifinals.
