= Awad Salah Nasser =

Yemeni middle-distance runner (born 1975)

Personal information
- Born: 26 September 1975 (age 50)
- Height: 1.68 m (5 ft 6 in)
- Weight: 60 kg (132 lb)

Sport
- Country: Yemen
- Sport: Athletics

Awad Salah Nasser (born 26 September 1975) is a Yemeni middle-distance runner who competed internationally for Yemen at the 1992 Summer Olympics.

== Career ==
Nasser was just 16 years old when he competed in the 1500 metres at the 1992 Summer Olympics held in Barcelona, Spain, he ran in heat 2 of the first round and finished in 11th position out of 13, so didn't qualify for the next round.
