= Eulucane Ndagijimana =

Rwandan middle-distance runner

Personal information
- Nationality: Rwandan
- Born: 22 March 1961 (age 65) Rwanda
- Height: 172 cm (5 ft 8 in)
- Weight: 68 kg (150 lb)

Sport
- Country: Rwanda
- Sport: Middle-distance running

Eulucane Ndagijimana is a Rwandan Olympic middle-distance runner. He represented his country in the men's 1500 meters and the men's 800 meters at the 1988 Summer Olympics. His time was 1:52.08 in the 800 m, and 3:51.61 in the 1500 m heats.
