= Dale Jones (runner) =

Antiguan and Barbudan middle-distance runner

Personal information
- Born: 12 March 1964 (age 62) St. John's, Antigua and Barbuda

Sport
- Sport: Track and field
Medal record
Representing Antigua and Barbuda
Central American and Caribbean Games
Silver medal – second place	1990 Mexico City	800m
Bronze medal – third place	1993 Ponce	800m
CARIFTA Games Junior (U20)
Silver medal – second place	1983 Fort-de-France	800m
Silver medal – second place	1983 Fort-de-France	1500m

Dale Anthony Jones (born 12 March 1964) is a retired Antigua and Barbudan middle distance runner who specialized in the 800 metres.

He won the silver medal at the 1990 Central American and Caribbean Games and the bronze medal at the 1993 Central American and Caribbean Games. At the 1984 Olympic Games he competed on the 4 × 400 m relay team. At the 1988 Olympic Games he was knocked out in the heats of the 1500 metres, but the time of 3:49.41 minutes was a new national record. At the 1991 World Championships he competed in both 800 m and 1500 m, setting a national 800 m record of 1:48.62 minutes. He also competed at the 1993 World Championships.

== Achievements ==
Year	Competition	Venue	Position	Event	Notes
Representing Antigua and Barbuda
1983	CARIFTA Games (U20)	Fort-de-France, Martinique	2nd	800 m	1:55.74
1983	CARIFTA Games (U20)	Fort-de-France, Martinique	2nd	1500 m	4:01.34
1983	Pan American Games	Caracas, Venezuela	13th (h)	800 m	1:53.07
1983	Pan American Games	Caracas, Venezuela	11th	1500 m	3:56.17
1983	Pan American Games	Caracas, Venezuela	7th	4 × 400 m relay	3:15.36
1984	Olympic Games	Los Angeles, United States	47th (h)	800 m	1:51.52
1984	Olympic Games	Los Angeles, United States	43rd (h)	1500 m	3:55.65
1984	Olympic Games	Los Angeles, United States	20th (h)	4 × 400 m relay	3:10.95
1987	World Indoor Championships	Indianapolis, United States	19th (h)	800 m	1:54.56
1987	World Indoor Championships	Indianapolis, United States	16th (h)	1500 m	4:04.14
1987	Pan American Games	Indianapolis, United States	7th (h)	800 m	1:49.42
1987	Pan American Games	Indianapolis, United States	11th	1500 m	3:55.08
1988	Olympic Games	Seoul, South Korea	40th (h)	800 m	1:49.31
1988	Olympic Games	Seoul, South Korea	42nd (h)	1500 m	3:51.22
1990	Central American and Caribbean Games	Mexico City, Mexico	2nd	800 m	1:51.18
1991	Pan American Games	Havana, Cuba	9th (h)	800 m	1:49.42
1991	World Championships	Tokyo, Japan	28th (h)	800 m	1:48.62
1991	World Championships	Tokyo, Japan	36th (h)	1500 m	3:55.41
1992	Olympic Games	Barcelona, Spain	37th (h)	800 m	1:50.43
1993	World Championships	Stuttgart, Germany	31st (h)	800 m	1:51.02
1993	World Championships	Stuttgart, Germany	40th (h)	1500 m	3:54.91
1993	Central American and Caribbean Games	Ponce, Puerto Rico	3rd	800 m	1:50.05
1993	Central American and Caribbean Games	Ponce, Puerto Rico	8th	1500 m	3:59.13
1998	Central American and Caribbean Games	Maracaibo, Venezuela	6th	800 m	1:53.07
1998	Central American and Caribbean Games	Maracaibo, Venezuela	11th	1500 m	3:56.75
1998	Commonwealth Games	Kuala Lumpur, Malaysia	23rd (h)	800 m	1:50.54
