= Reuben Appleton =

Antiguan Olympic middle-distance runner

Personal information
- Nationality: Antiguan
- Born: 25 April 1968 (age 58) Antigua
- Height: 173 cm (5 ft 8 in)
- Weight: 67 kg (148 lb)

Sport
- Country: Antigua and Barbuda
- Sport: Middle-distance running

Reuben Recaldo Appleton is an Antiguan Olympic middle-distance runner. He represented his country in the men's 1500 meters at the 1992 Summer Olympics. His time was a 4:02.99.
