= Isaac Ganunga =

Malawian middle-distance runner

Isaac Ganunga (born December 10, 1959) is a retired Malawian middle-distance runner.

He competed in the 1500 metres at the 1984 Olympic Games as well as the 800 and 1500 metres at the 1986 Commonwealth Games without reaching the final. At the 1987 All-Africa Games he competed in the 4 x 400 metres relay and helped setting a Malawian record that still stands.
