= Gerry O'Reilly =

Irish middle-distance runner (1964–2026)

Personal information
- Nationality: Irish
- Born: 1 July 1964 Dunboyne, County Meath, Ireland
- Died: 11 June 2026 (aged 61) Phoenixville, Pennsylvania, U.S.
- Height: 188 cm (6 ft 2 in)
- Weight: 72 kg (159 lb)

Sport
- Country: Ireland
- Sport: Middle-distance running

Gerard Christopher O'Reilly (1 July 1964 – 11 June 2026) was an Irish Olympic middle-distance runner and fund manager. He represented his country in the Men's 1500 metres at the 1988 Summer Olympics. His time was a 3:43.23 in the first heat. From 1992 on Reilly worked at The Vanguard Group and in his role there was principal portfolio manager of one of the world's largest mutual funds.

== Early life ==
O'Reilly was born and raised in Dunboyne, County Meath. Growing up O'Reilly played soccer and GAA before concentrating on track at the age of sixteen. He won the Irish Junior 1500 meter championships.

== College ==
In 1983, Villanova University offered O'Reilly a scholarship to run track. He ran sub-4 minute miles on several occasions. He graduated from Villanova in 1987 with a B.S. in economics. and was inducted into the Villanova varsity club Hall of Fame in 2009.

== Track and field ==
O'Reilly represented Ireland in the men's 1500 meters at the 1988 Summer Olympic Games in Seoul, South Korea.

== Financial career ==
O'Reilly worked at Vanguard from March 1992 and was a principal portfolio manager, overseeing over $800B in assets, including the Vanguard Total Stock Market Index Fund (VTSAX) which is the third largest U.S. mutual fund by assets under management.

== Death ==
O'Reilly died in Phoenixville, Pennsylvania, on 11 June 2026, at the age of 61, after suffering a cardiac incident in nearby Chester Springs, where he lived.

== See also ==
- 1987 World Championships in Athletics – Men's 1500 metres
- 1989 IAAF World Indoor Championships – Men's 3000 metres
