= Duan Xiuquan =

Chinese middle-distance runner

Duan Xiquan
Personal information
- Nationality: Chinese
- Born: 3 April 1967 (age 59) China
- Height: 171 cm (5 ft 7 in)
- Weight: 55 kg (121 lb)

Sport
- Country: China
- Sport: Middle-distance running
Medal record
Men's athletics
Representing China
Asian Championships
Gold medal – first place	1987 Singapore	1500 m

Duan Xiquan is a Chinese Olympic middle-distance runner. He represented his country in the men's 1500 meters and the men's 800 meters at the 1988 Summer Olympics. His time was a 1:52.17 in the 800, and a 3:44.88 in the 1500 heats.
