= Rémy Geoffroy =

French middle-distance runner

Personal information
- Nationality: French
- Born: 22 March 1963 (age 63) Dijon
- Height: 175 cm (5 ft 9 in)
- Weight: 67 kg (148 lb)

Sport
- Country: France
- Sport: Middle-distance running

Rémy Geoffroy is a French Olympic middle-distance runner. He represented his country in the men's 1500 meters at the 1988 Summer Olympics. His time was a 3:41.68 in the first heat, and a 3:40.96 in the semifinals.
