= Han Kulker =

Dutch middle-distance runner

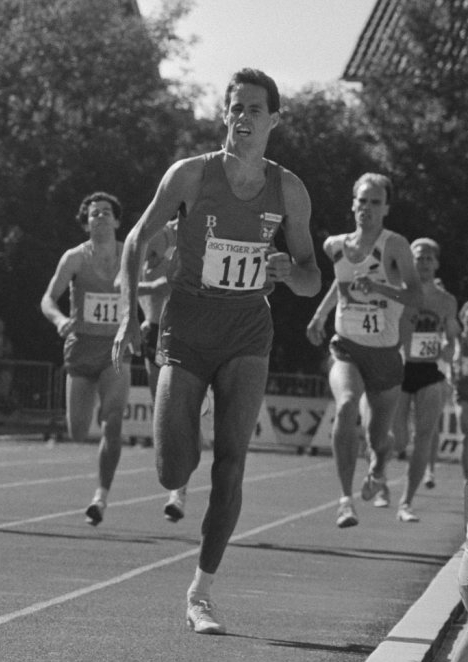
- Kulker in 1987

Personal information
- Full name: Johannes Nicolaas Maria Kulker
- Born: 15 August 1959 (age 66) Leidschendam, Netherlands
- Years active: 1980-1991
- Height: 1.82 m (6 ft 0 in)
- Weight: 63 kg (139 lb)

Achievements and titles
- Personal best(s): 800m - 1:46.85 (1985); 1500m - 3:36.08 (1987); Mile – 3:53.93 (1985)
Medal record
Men's athletics
Representing the Netherlands
European Championships
Bronze medal – third place	1986 Stuttgart	1500 m
World Indoor Championships
Bronze medal – third place	1987 Indianapolis	1500 m
- Updated on 2 April 2013

Johannes Nicolaas Maria Kulker (born 15 August 1959) is a Dutch former middle distance runner who won a bronze medal at the 1986 European Championships in Athletics in Stuttgart over 1500 metres. The race was won by Steve Cram.

Two years later, Kulker finished sixth in the 1500 m final of the 1988 Summer Olympics in Seoul, where Peter Rono won gold. In 1987 Kulker won the bronze medal at the World Indoor Championships in Athletics over 1500 metres.

== International competitions ==
Year	Competition	Venue	Position	Event	Notes
Representing Netherlands
1985	European Indoor Championships	Piraeus, Greece	11th (h)	1500m	3:41.88
1986	European Indoor Championships	Madrid, Spain	3rd	1500m	3:46.46
1986	European Championships	Stuttgart, Germany	3rd	1500m	3:42.11
1987	European Indoor Championships	Lievin, France	1st	1500m	3:44.79
1987	World Indoor Championships	Indianapolis, United States	3rd	1500m	3:39.51
1987	World Championships	Rome, Italy	9th	1500m	3:42.16
1988	Olympic Games	Seoul, South Korea	6th	1500m	3:37.08
1989	European Indoor Championships	The Hague, Netherlands	2nd	1500m	3:47.57
1989	World Indoor Championships	Budapest, Hungary	5th	1500m	3:45.93
1990	European Championships	Split, Yugoslavia	7th	1500m	3:39.85
(h) Indicates overall position in qualifying heats

Awards
Preceded by Rob Druppers	Herman van Leeuwen Cup; 1986, 1987	Succeeded by Robert de Wit
