= Michael Watson (athlete) =

Bermudian middle-distance runner

Personal information
- Nationality: Bermudian
- Born: 29 March 1958 (age 68) Bermuda
- Height: 176 cm (5 ft 9 in)
- Weight: 63 kg (139 lb)

Sport
- Country: Bermuda
- Sport: Middle-distance running

Michael Watson is a Bermudian Olympic middle-distance runner. He represented his country in the men's 1500 meters and the men's 800 meters at the 1988 Summer Olympics. His time was a 1:50.16 in the 800, and a 3:46.49 in the 1500 heats.
