= Metiku Megersa =

Ethiopian middle-distance runner

Personal information
- Nationality: Ethiopian
- Born: 28 February 1973 (age 53)

Sport
- Sport: Middle-distance running
- Event: 1500 metres

Metiku Megersa (born 28 February 1973) is an Ethiopian middle-distance runner. He competed in the men's 1500 metres at the 1992 Summer Olympics.
