= Mohamed Taki (athlete) =

Moroccan middle-distance runner

Mohamed Taki (born 1971) is a retired Moroccan middle distance runner who specialized in the 1500 metres.

He finished eighth at the 1993 World Championships and sixth at the 1993 Mediterranean Games. He also competed at the 1993 World Indoor Championships without reaching the final.

His personal best time was 3.36.19 minutes, achieved in August 1993 in Köln.
