= Kenneth Dzekedzeke =

Malawian middle-distance runner (born 1969)

Personal information
- Nationality: Malawian
- Born: 1 April 1969 (age 57)
- Height: 185 cm (6 ft 1 in)

Sport
- Sport: Middle-distance running
- Event: 800 metres

Kenneth Dzekedzeke (born 1 April 1969) is a Malawian middle-distance runner. He competed in the men's 800 metres at the 1988 Summer Olympics.

== Athletics career ==
Dzekedzeke initially started out as a trainer for his sister Mandaliza, a cross country competitor, before taking up competitive athletics himself in 1986. After competing in school 400m and 800m events he gained the attention of British athletics coach Frank Gallagher, who helped develop him into a national and international-level athlete.

He won silver at the Independence Celebration Games in Mozambique in 1987 and the same year set the Malawian 800m record at the All-Africa Games with a time of 1 minute 49; the record still stood as of 2012.

Dzekedzeke placed sixth in the third heat at the 800m event at the 1988 Seoul Olympics; only the top three in each heat qualified. He went on to compete at the 1990 Commonwealth Games 800m heats and the 1991 All-Africa Games.

== Coaching career ==
Following these competitions Dzekedzeke won a scholarship to study a diploma in athletics coaching at the University of Mainz. He returned from Germany in 1993 and spent the next decade training Malawian athletes including Catherine Chikwakwa and Francis Munthali. He has also served as an executive member of the Malawi Olympic Committee and as head coach for Malawian athletes at the 2008 Beijing Olympics.
