= Rachid Kram =

Algerian middle-distance runner

Personal information
- Nationality: Algerian
- Born: 5 April 1963 (age 63) Jijel, Algeria
- Height: 182 cm (6 ft 0 in)
- Weight: 76 kg (168 lb)

Sport
- Country: Algeria
- Sport: Middle-distance running
- Event: 1500m - Mile

Achievements and titles
- Personal best: 3:36.26

Rachid Kram is an Algerian Olympic middle-distance runner. He represented his country in the men's 1500 meters at the 1988 Summer Olympics. His time was a 3:39.90 in the first heat, and a 3:41.39 in the semifinals. He established the Algerian record in the 1500m in Verona Italy on July 27, 1988, with the time of 3:36:26. He was the Algerian champion for several years between 1982 and 1992.
