= Kipkoech Cheruiyot =

Kenyan middle-distance runner

Personal information
- Born: December 2, 1964 (age 61)

Sport
- Sport: Track and field
Medal record
Representing Kenya
African Championships
Gold medal – first place	1982 Cairo	1500 m
Summer Universiade
Gold medal – first place	1989 Duisburg	1500 m

Kipkoech "Kip" Cheruiyot (a.k.a. Charles Kipkoech Cheruiyot; born December 2, 1964) is a retired middle distance runner from Kenya.

== Biography ==
At the 1982 African Championships, he won the 1500 metres gold medal, leaving the famous Saïd Aouita in second place. Cheruiyot was then slightly less than 18 years old.

In 1983, he broke the world junior record at men's 1500 metres by running 3:34.92 in Munich.

He represented Kenya at the Athletics at the 1988 Summer Olympics and finished 7th in the men's 1500 metres race, which was won by his compatriot Peter Rono. At the 1987 World championships, he was 11th in the 1500 metres final. At the 1984 Summer Olympics, he failed to reach the semifinals

He was gold medalist at the 1989 Summer Universiade. At the time he was based at Mount St. Mary's University (College) located in Emmitsburg, Maryland.

His twin brother Charles Cheruiyot is also a former athlete.

== Achievements ==
Year	Competition	Venue	Position	Event	Notes
Representing Kenya
1982	African Championships	Cairo, Egypt	1st	1500 m	3:42.20
