= John Siguria =

Papua New Guinean athlete

Personal information
- Nationality: Papua New Guinean
- Born: 28 July 1965 (age 60) Milne Bay, Papua New Guinea

Sport
- Sport: Middle-distance running
- Event: 800 metres

John Siguria (also given as John D'Siguria) (born 28 July 1965) is a Papua New Guinean middle-distance runner. He competed in the men's 800 metres at the 1988 Summer Olympics. Siguria also won gold at the 800m in the 1985 South Pacific Mini Games. He also competed at the 1990 Commonwealth Games in the 800m and 1500m events.

He was a nine-time national champion.
