= Azat Rakipau =

Belarusian long-distance runner

Personal information
- Nationality: Belarusian
- Born: 29 November 1968 (age 56)

Sport
- Sport: Long-distance running
- Event: Marathon

Azat Rakipau (born 29 November 1968) is a Belarusian long-distance runner. He competed in the men's marathon at the 2004 Summer Olympics.
