= Luis Núñez (athlete) =

Dominican athlete

Luis Núñez (born October or November 11, 1964) is an athlete from the Dominican Republic who ran in the 1500m at the World Track and Field Championships in Tokyo, Japan in 1991. Luis Núñez also won two National Championships for the NCAA II in the 1500m indoors, in 1990 and 1991.
