= Rachid El Basir =

Moroccan middle-distance runner

Medal record

Men's Athletics

Representing Morocco

Olympic Games
Silver medal – second place	1992 Barcelona	1500 metres

Rachid El Basir (Arabic: رشيد البصير) born February 8, 1968) is a Moroccan middle distance runner who won the silver medal at the 1992 Summer Olympics over 1500 metres. This achievement came as a great surprise as an El Basir had not qualified for the final at the World Championships the previous year and was generally considered as an outsider. The final in Barcelona was run at an extremely slow pace, which helped El Basir as he could make good use of his natural speed on the last 200m.
