= Jonah Birir =

Kenyan middle-distance runner

Jonah Birir (born December 27, 1971, in Eldama Ravine, Koibatek) is a former Kenyan middle-distance runner.

In 1988 he won the World Junior Championships held in Sudbury, Canada, over 800 metres, and at the 1990 World Junior Championships he won a silver medal in a personal best time of 1:46.61. He then concentrated on the 1500 metres distance, finishing fifth in the 1992 Summer Olympics final in Barcelona. The final was won by Fermín Cacho of Spain. The same year Birir finished second at the IAAF World Cup.

His personal best was 3:33.86 seconds, achieved during the Zürich meet in 1993.
