= Peter Elliott (runner) =

British middle-distance runner (born 1962)

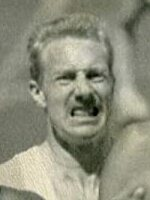

Personal information
- Nationality: British (English)
- Born: 9 October 1962 (age 64) Rawmarsh, Rotherham, England
- Height: 181 cm (5 ft 11 in)
- Weight: 67 kg (148 lb)

Sport
- Sport: Athletics
- Event: middle-distance
- Club: Rotherham Harriers & AC
Medal record
Men's Athletics
Representing Great Britain
Olympic Games
Silver medal – second place	1988 Seoul	1500 m
World Championships
Silver medal – second place	1987 Rome	800 m
Representing England
Commonwealth Games
Gold medal – first place	1990 Auckland	1500 m
Bronze medal – third place	1986 Edinburgh	800 m

Peter Elliott (born 9 October 1962) is a former middle-distance runner from the United Kingdom. During his career, he won the gold medal in the 1500 metres at the 1990 Commonwealth Games, the silver medal in the 1500 metres at the 1988 Olympic Games, and the silver medal in the 800 metres at the 1987 World Championships.

== Early life ==
Elliott was brought up in Rawmarsh, near Rotherham, in the then West Riding of Yorkshire. He attended Rawmarsh Comprehensive School and later worked as a joiner at British Steel Corporation. He managed to establish himself as a world class athlete while working full-time. He lived at 40 Wheatcroft Avenue.

He began his athletic career by running in the Young Athletes League for his local club, Rotherham Harriers, where he variously held the under 15, under 16 and under 19 record for 800m. He also held the UK under-17 record with a time of 1 minute 50.7 seconds, which stood for nearly 10 years. He excelled as a schoolboy athlete, winning four English Schools titles, twice at 800 metres and twice over the country.

== Career ==
In August 1982, he set a 4 × 800 metres relay world record of 7 minutes 3.89 seconds with fellow British athletes Sebastian Coe, Steve Cram and Garry Cook. Although injury ended his 1982 season early, he won his first senior medal at the 1983 European Indoor Championships in the 800 m, in Budapest, winning the silver medal in 1:47.58 behind Spaniard Colomán Trabado. At the 1983 World Championships held in Helsinki, he finished 4th in the 800m final.

Elliott was not selected for the 1500m at the 1984 Olympic Games in Los Angeles, losing out to the eventual gold and silver medallists, Sebastian Coe and Steve Cram, and the then world record holder, Steve Ovett. At the time, it was a very controversial decision. After Ovett and Cram had secured their places, the third place was either Coe's or Elliott's. Although Elliott defeated Coe at the AAA's Championships, the selectors opted for Coe who was the reigning Olympic champion having won the event at the Moscow Olympics in 1980. Elliott was selected for the 800m and qualified for the semi-finals, but had to withdraw due to an injury.

Elliott won a bronze medal in the 800m at the 1986 Commonwealth Games in Edinburgh, behind Steve Cram and Tom McKean. He then won a silver medal in the event at the 1987 World Championships in Rome in a personal best 1:43.41. Later that year, he improved his 1500 m best to 3:33.23 behind world record-holder Said Aouita in Rieti. The following year, he set British indoor records at 1500m and mile and improved his outdoor bests to 3:32.94 and 3:49.20, and won the British 1500 metres Olympic Trial, and was selected for the middle-distance double at the Olympics with Cram, ahead of Coe. Elliott subsequently won the silver medal in the 1500m at the Olympic Games in Seoul. He also finished fourth in the Olympic 800m final, despite needing daily pain-killing cortisone injections in his groin.

In January 1990, he became the Commonwealth champion over 1500m in Auckland. Later in the year, he ran 1:42.97 over 800m in Seville (ranking him No. 1 in the world for 1990, and making him the third fastest Briton of all time over the distance) and in the same city also broke the world indoor record for 1500 metres, improving the previous best by Marcus O’Sullivan to 3:35.60. This made him the favourite to win both middle distance gold medals at the 1990 European Championships in Split. However, due to injury problems he only entered for the 1500m and was tripped in the semi-final. After an appeal by the British team he was reinstated (against his own wishes and those of some other athletes, and went on to finish fourth in the final. A year later, he defeated the European champion Jens-Peter Herold in the 1500m race at the European Cup in Frankfurt. He also won the Fifth Avenue Mile in 1987, 1989 and 1990, the latter in 3:47.83 min. Elliot was hoping to compete at the 1992 Barcelona Olympics, but tore his hamstring on his home track in Rotherham six weeks prior to the start of the Games and injury effectively ended his career whilst still in his late twenties.

Elliott was three times British 800 metres champion after winning the British AAA Championships title at the 1982 AAA Championships and the 1987 AAA Championships and being the best placed British athlete in 1983. He was also the British 1500 metres champion, winning the AAA title in 1984 and 1988.

He set a British indoor mile record of 3:52.02 in 1990, which stood until bettered by Josh Kerr in February 2022, with Kerr's split time also bettering Elliott's British 1500m indoor record of 3:34.20. As of April 2026, he is the fifth fastest Briton of all time in the 800 m, after Coe, Ben Pattison, Max Burgin and Cram.

After retiring from competition running in 1992, Elliott became a coach and race organiser. He joined Newcastle-based sports marketing agency Nova International, where he was Director of Running. In 2004 he became the Athlete Services Manager for Yorkshire at the English Institute of Sport in Sheffield.

== Personal bests ==
Distance	Mark	Date
400 m	48.2	1984
600 m	1:16.6	1983
800 m	1:42.97	1990
1000 m	2:16.30	1990
1500 m	3:32.69	1990
Mile	3:49.20	1988
2000 m	4:52.82	1987
3000 m	8:07.51	1991
