= Pat Scammell =

Australian middle-distance runner

Personal information
- Nationality: Australian
- Born: 15 April 1961 (age 64) Wodonga, Victoria, Australia
- Height: 189 cm (6 ft 2 in)
- Weight: 67 kg (148 lb)

Sport
- Sport: Athletics
- Event: middle-distance
- Club: Glenhuntly Athletics Club

Patrick Gerard Scammell (born 15 April 1961) is a retired Australian runner who specialized in the 1500 metres. Scammell competed at both the 1984 and 1988 Olympic Games, reaching the semi-finals of the 1500 metres in 1988.

== Biography ==
Born and raised in Albury (NSW), he also competed at the 1987 and 1991 World Championships, as well as the 1982, 1986, 1990 and 1994 Commonwealth Games. After coming second on four previous occasions, Scammell was Australian 1500 metres champion in 1992, his first Australian title.

Scammell finished third behind Peter Elliott in the 800 metres event at the British 1987 AAA Championships.

Scammell first trained under David Jones, before moving to Canberra. Throughout his 16-year career, he was coached by Pat Clohessy and Chris 'Rab' Wardlaw in Australia. During his time in the European 1986 - 1990 seasons, he was guided by John Anderson in London.

Scammell can claim to be the Australian who has clocked more sub 4 minute miles than any other in Australia, a total of 28 times. The first time was in 1982 and in 1991 he set what would be his lifetime best of 3:53.58.

A strong supporter of Australian athletics, Scammell is the only Australian in the top 10 All time 1500m rankings of Australian athletes to have set their lifetime the best time on Australian soil.

Following his retirement, Scammell remains active in the sport he loves. He has been a board member of Athletics Victoria, worked at the Australian Masters Games, Australian Sports Commission, Athletics Tasmania and more recently as a Senior Advisor to the Victorian Sports Minister.

With links to the Border Track & Field Club and Glenhuntly Athletics Club, Scammell also coached many athletes, including Richard Welsh (2003 Australian 1500m finalist), Kevin Laws (Australian representative in Mt Running), Adam Byles (Victorian Country Champion), Matt Gibney (Australian U'20 800m, 1500m champion). Pat was fitness coach for North Albury AFL Football Club in the Ovens and Murray League in 2011 and 2012.

== Personal bests ==
- 800m 1:45.74 Burnaby (CAN) 16.07.1984
- 1000m 2:17.98 London (GBR) 22.08.1987
- 1500m 3:34.61 Melbourne (AUS) 17.03.1988
- Mile 3:53.58 Melbourne (AUS) 07.02.1991
- 2000m 5:03.62 Köln (GER) 19.08.1990
- 3000m 7:53.38 Canberra (AUS) 01.12.1990
