= Mogens Guldberg =

Danish middle-distance runner

Mogens Daniel Guldberg (born 2 August 1963 in Kalundborg) is a former middle distance runner from Denmark, who represented his native country at the 1988 Summer Olympics in Seoul, South Korea. There he was eliminated in the semifinals of the 1500 metres. He represented Sparta.

He finished twelfth at the 1990 European Championships. Over 3000 metres at the IAAF World Indoor Championships he finished eighth in 1987, fourth in 1991 and fifth in 1993. He is a one-time national champion (1995) in the men's 5,000 metres.

== International competitions ==
Year	Competition	Venue	Position	Event	Notes
Representing Denmark
1986	European Championships	Stuttgart, Germany	22nd (h)	1500 m	3:42.84
1987	World Indoor Championships	Indianapolis, United States	8th	3000 m	8:10.25
1987	World Championships	Rome, Italy	24th (sf)	1500 m	3:50.79
1988	Olympic Games	Seoul, South Korea	16th (sf)	1500 m	3:39.86
1990	European Championships	Split, Yugoslavia	12th	1500 m	3:42.76
1991	World Indoor Championships	Seville, Barcelona	4th	3000 m	7:44.76
1991	World Championships	Tokyo, Japan	20th (sf)	1500 m	3:44.34
1993	World Indoor Championships	Toronto, Canada	5th	3000 m	7:52.60
1994	European Championships	Helsinki, Finland	17th (sf)	1500 m	3:40.89
{#) Indicates overall position in qualifying heats (h) or semifinals (sf)
