= Teófilo Benito =

Spanish middle-distance runner

Teófilo Benito (22 July 1966 in Alcolea de Calatrava – 15 August 2004 in Madrid) was a Spanish middle distance runner, who specialized in the 1500 metres.

Benito competed at the 1987 and 1991 World Championships, reaching the semi-final heat on both occasions. He won a bronze medal at the 1987 Mediterranean Games and finished fourteenth at the 1986 Goodwill Games.
