= Michael Hillardt =

Australian middle-distance runner

Michael Howard Hillardt (born 22 January 1961) is an Australian former middle distance runner who reached the semi-finals of the 1500m at the 1984 Summer Olympics Mike also finished 7th in the 1500m final at the [1987 world championships], beating Steve Cram to the finish line. 1985 World Indoor Champion and gold medal at 1500m. Australian 1500 Record of 3:33 was bettered in 1990. Hillardt ranks seventh all time Australian in the 1500m and eighth all time in the one mile event. He held both Australian records for a period.
