= Jens-Peter Herold =

German middle-distance runner

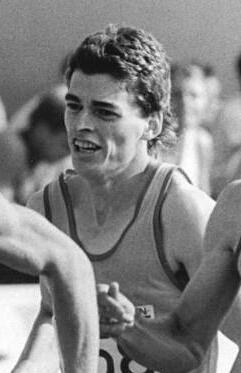
- Herold in 1987

Medal record

Men's athletics

Representing East Germany

Olympic Games
Bronze medal – third place	1988 Seoul	1500 m

European Championships
Gold medal – first place	1990 Split	1500 m

Jens-Peter Herold (born 2 June 1965 in Neuruppin) is a retired German middle-distance runner who participated in several international championships in the late 1980s and early 1990s.

In the 1987 World Championships he came sixth over 1500 metres. The following year he won a bronze medal (finishing behind Peter Rono and Peter Elliott) at the Seoul Olympics and also ran a new German record for the mile run in 3:49.22 min. which is still unbroken (as of 2019).

In 1990 he won the European Championships double finishing first both indoor and outdoor over 1500 m. Herold was renowned for his finishing kick which secured him victories over potentially stronger competitors. However, in 1991 he lost an almost certain bronze medal at the World Championships in Tokyo by appearing to prematurely relax just before the finishing line and was overtaken by his countryman Hauke Fuhlbrügge. Noureddine Morceli and Wilfred Kirochi won gold and silver in that race.

In 1992 he came sixth in the Olympic final in Barcelona. In the same year he also set a new personal best of 3:32.77 minutes in Rieti. This result places him third on the German all-time performers list, behind Thomas Wessinghage and Harald Hudak. Having qualified for the 1993 World Championships in Stuttgart he injured himself in the heats.

He competed for the sports clubs ASK Vorwärts Potsdam, SC Neubrandenburg and SC Charlottenburg during his active career.
