= Joseph Chesire =

Kenyan middle-distance runner

Medal record

Men's athletics

Representing Kenya

African Championships
Gold medal – first place	1989 Lagos	1500 m
Silver medal – second place	1989 Lagos	800 m
Bronze medal – third place	1985 Cairo	1500 m

Joseph Chesire (born November 12, 1957) is a former Kenyan middle-distance runner who represented his country in the 1984, 1988 and 1992 Summer Olympics. He came fourth in Los Angeles and Barcelona. Cheshire also won the 1500 m at the London Grand Prix in 1992. His greatest indoor achievement was the bronze medal at the 1985 IAAF World Indoor Games.

He became the oldest entrant into the 1500 metres at the World Championships in Athletics, at 35 years, 281 days at the 1993 edition.

== International competitions ==
Year	Competition	Venue	Position	Event	Notes
Representing Kenya
1987	All-Africa Games	Nairobi, Kenya	3rd	1500 m	3:39.84
