= Markus Hacksteiner =

Swiss middle-distance runner

Markus Hacksteiner (born November 18, 1964, in Windisch, Aargau) is a former middle distance runner from Switzerland, who represented his native country at the 1988 Summer Olympics in Seoul, South Korea. There he was eliminated in the semifinals of the 1500 metres.

He finished eighth at the 1990 European Championships, and won a silver medal in 3000 metres at the 1988 European Indoor Championships.
