= Steve Scott (runner) =

American track athlete

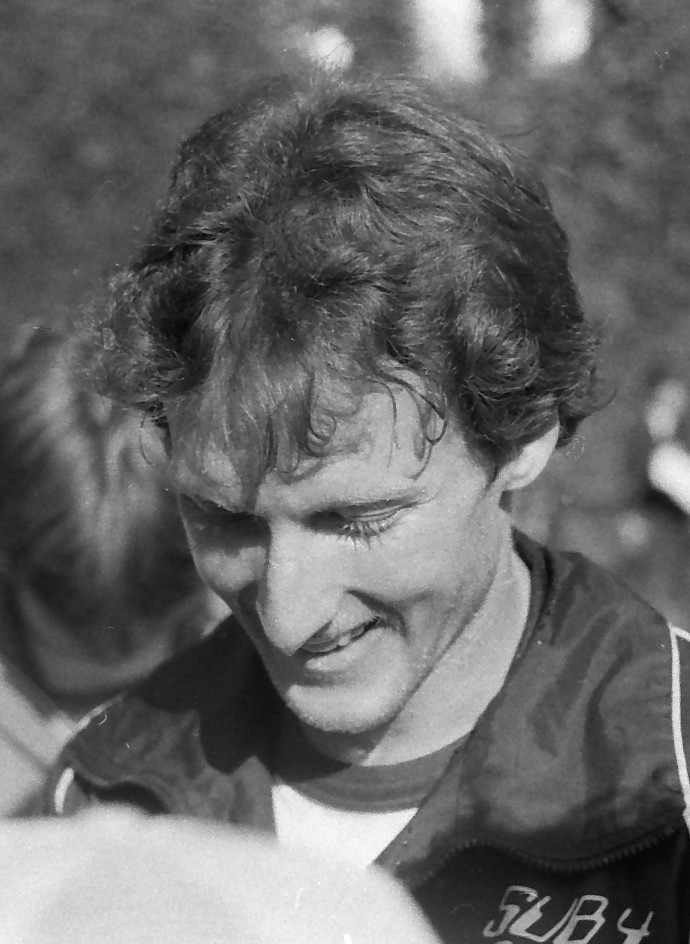
- Scott signing autographs in Toronto in 1982

Personal information
- Nationality: American
- Born: May 5, 1956 (age 70) Upland, California, U.S.
- Height: 186 cm (6 ft 1 in)
- Weight: 73 kg (161 lb)

Sport
- Sport: Athletics
- Events: 1500 meters, mile
- College team: UC Irvine
- Club: Tiger Track Club

Achievements and titles
- Personal bests: 800m: 1:45.05; 1500m: 3:31.76; Mile: 3:47.69; 3000m: 7:36.69; 5000m: 13:30.39
Medal record
Men's athletics
Representing United States
World Championships
Silver medal – second place	1983 Helsinki	1500 m

Steve Scott (born May 5, 1956) is an American former track athlete who competed at the 1984 Summer Olympics and the 1988 Summer Olympics. Track & Field News ranked Scott #1 in the U.S. on ten occasions, and eleven times during his career he was ranked in the top ten in the world by T&FN. Scott is also regarded as the founder of speed golf in 1979.

== Early years ==
Scott grew up in the 1960s in Upland, California. His mother was a runner who preceded the running boom and through his mother's influence and Robert Loney's persistence (his coach), Scott ran on Upland's cross country team. Runner Dave Wottle inspired Scott to wear a cap in every race of the 1972 cross country season. In his junior year in high school, Scott made the varsity squad as the fifth runner. In track, he concentrated on the shorter distances and ran the 800 in 1:58 and the mile in 4:30. He also met Kim Votaw, a freshman runner who would eventually become his wife in 1979.

In his senior year, Scott became the top runner on the cross country team and improved his track times to 1:52 in the 800 and 4:15 in the mile. He finished fourth in the CIF California State Meet in the 880 yards and drew several college scholarship offers. He joined coach Len Miller at the University of California, Irvine in the fall of 1974 and still holds the UCI school record in the 1500, and the UC Irvine Steve Scott Invitational is named after him. While at UCI, Scott won the 1977 NCAA Men's Outdoor Track and Field Championships Division-I 1500-meter title after winning the 1500 twice and the mile once at three previous NCAA Division-II meets.

Scott ran his first sub-4:00 mile indoors at the Sunkist Invitational in Los Angeles in January 1977. The following year, he became an international miler, competing on both sides of the Atlantic. When he graduated with a degree in social ecology in 1978, Scott had already run 11 sub-4:00 miles.

== International running career ==
When Sebastian Coe set a mile record of 3:48.95 in Oslo on July 17, 1979, Scott finished second with a time of 3:51.11. Because records at the time were rounded up to the nearest tenth of a second, Scott missed tying Jim Ryun's American mile record of 3:51.1 by 1/100 of a second. However, in 1981, the IAAF started to recognize records in running events longer than 400 meters to the hundredth of a second, meaning that Scott's 3:51.11 had tied Ryun's record, depending on how the times were interpreted.

Scott won the British AAA Championships title in the 800 metres event at the 1979 AAA Championships and won the 1500 m at the 1980 U.S. Olympic Trials but did not compete at the Moscow Games due to the U.S. boycott. He received one of 461 Congressional Gold Medals created especially for the spurned athletes, and won the 1500 m at the Liberty Bell Classic organised for athletes from boycotting nations.

His first undisputed American record came when he ran third in another Oslo race on July 11, 1981, with a time of 3:49.68, becoming the first American to break 3:50 in the event and the fifth ever to do so. He also set the U.S. indoor record over the 2000 meters in 1981.

The following year Scott broke the American mile record twice, both times again at Oslo. First, he won a race on June 26, 1982, in 3:48.53, becoming history's third-fastest miler behind Coe and Steve Ovett; then 11 days later he ran 3:47.69, the second-fastest mile in history. That time would stand for 25 years until Alan Webb ran 3:46.91 in 2007.

Scott won the silver medal behind Steve Cram in the 1500 meters at the first official IAAF World Championships in Athletics in Helsinki, Finland, in 1983 and pariticpated in his first Olympic Games at the 1984 Olympics in Los Angeles, where he placed 10th. He was the 1500 m bronze medalist at the 1987 Pan American Games and at the 1988 Games in Seoul he finished 5th in the 1500 metres.

Scott raced indoors, outdoors, on the road and in cross country, competing in as many as 50 competitions a year. This included three top ten finishes in the U.S. National Cross Country Championships (7th in 1979, 4th in 1980, and 6th in 1981) as well as three victories in the Carlsbad 5000 road race from 1986 to 1988. His times at Carlsbad in 1986 (13:32) and 1988 (13:30) were world best times for a road 5K.

In the closing stages of a career, Scott attempted to run a sub-4:00 mile at age-40 in 1996 but was derailed by a battle with testicular cancer.

== Coaching ==
He was cured of testicular cancer and since retiring from competition he built a successful NAIA collegiate program as Head Coach of track and cross country at Cal State San Marcos. At San Marcos he has led the women's team to 3 National Titles from 2009 to 2011, and in 2011 the men's team placed 2nd.

In 2002, he was inducted into the USA Track and Field Hall of Fame. Scott and his wife JoAnn live in Lake Kiowa, Texas. They have two sons and a daughter.

== Personal bests ==
Distance	Mark	Data	Location
800 m	1:45.05	July 4, 1982	Byrkjelo, Norway
1000 m	2:16.40	August 23, 1981	Nice, France
1500 m	3:31.76	July 16, 1985	Nice, France
One Mile	3:47.69	July 7, 1982	Oslo, Norway
3000 m	7:36.69	September 1, 1981	Ingleheim, Germany
5000 m	13:30.39	June 6, 1987	Eugene, Oregon

== Book ==
- Steve Scott & Marc Bloom, Steve Scott the Miler Macmillan (1997) ISBN 978-0-02-861677-3

Sporting positions
Preceded by Jim Ryun, 3:51.1, 1967	American Record holder in mile run, 3:47.69; 1982	Succeeded by Alan Webb, 3:46.91, 2007
Preceded by Eamonn Coghlan	Men's 3000 m Best Year Performance; 1981	Succeeded by David Moorcroft
