= Marcus O'Sullivan =

Irish middle-distance runner

Personal information
- Born: 22 December 1961 (age 64)

Achievements and titles
- Olympic finals: 1984, 1988, 1992, 1996
- Personal best(s): 800m: 1:45.87; 1500m: 3:33.61
Medal record
Men's Athletics
Representing Ireland
World Indoor Championships
Gold medal – first place	1987 Indianapolis	1500 m
Gold medal – first place	1989 Budapest	1500 m
Gold medal – first place	1993 Toronto	1500 m
European Indoor Championships
Silver medal – second place	1985 Athens/Piraeus	1500 m

Marcus O'Sullivan (born in Cork, Ireland on 22 December 1961) is an Irish retired middle-distance runner. He competed for Ireland at four Summer Olympics. After Steve Scott and John Walker, he is the third all-time by total of sub-4 minute miles run over the course of his career, at 101.

== Running career ==
Although he wasn't planning to go to any of Ireland's universities, O'Sullivan's running encouraged him to go to Villanova University at 19. While competing on a collegiate level, he worked towards a degree in accounting and later attained an MBA and a CPA.

The three World Indoor 1500 metre Championships won by O'Sullivan were in 1987 (Indianapolis), 1989 (Budapest), and 1993 (Toronto). In his victories in 1987 and 1989, he set championship records. He was 4th in the 1991 Seville world indoor championships.

At the 1985 European Athletics Indoor Championships, O'Sullivan won a silver medal in the 1500m. During 1985, he also won the British AAA Championships title in the 1500 metres event at the 1985 AAA Championships.

O'Sullivan qualified for four Olympic Games for Ireland: 1984, 1988, 1992, and 1996, at both 800 metres and 1500 metres. He reached the 1500 metre finals at the 1988 Seoul Olympics.

He set an indoor 1500 metres world record of 3:35.4 on 10 February 1989, and was generally regarded as a better competitor running indoors. This is evidenced by the fact that O'Sullivan won the prestigious Wanamaker Mile in Madison Square Garden's Millrose Games six times (1986, 1988, 1989, 1990, 1992, and 1996).

His personal best for the mile, which was set indoors in 1988, is 3:50.94. His personal best for the 1500 metres, which was set outdoors in 1996, is 3:33.61.

O'Sullivan, along with Irish runners Ray Flynn, Eamonn Coghlan, and Frank O'Mara established the still standing world record in the 4 x 1 mile relay, when they combined in Dublin on 17 August 1985 to run 15:49.08.

O'Sullivan now runs the RunningWorks cross country camp during the summer, and is the head coach of Villanova cross country and track and field. He was coached by Tom Donnelly of Haverford College and advised Bob Kennedy in the later years before Kennedy's retirement.

In addition to his ties to American record holder Bob Kennedy, O'Sullivan has coached elite professional runners such as Canadian indoor world silver medalist Carmen Douma-Hussar, and New Zealander Adrian Blincoe.

Marcus was added to the Leevale Athletic Club s Hall of Fame in 2008
