= Mohamed Suleiman =

Qatari middle-distance runner (born 1969)

Mohammed Suleiman
Personal information
- Full name: Mohammad Ahmed Suleiman
- Nationality: Qatari
- Born: Doha, Qatar
- Height: 1.79 m (5 ft 10 in)
- Weight: 67 kg (148 lb)

Sport
- Country: Qatar
- Sport: Athletics
- Event: Middle distance running
- Club: Mizuno Track Club International
Medal record
Men's athletics
Representing Qatar
Olympic Games
Bronze medal – third place	1992 Barcelona	1500 m
IAAF World Cup
Gold medal – first place	1992 Havana	1500 m
Bronze medal – third place	1994 London	1500 m
Asian Games
Gold medal – first place	1990 Beijing	1500 m
Gold medal – first place	1990 Beijing	5000 m
Gold medal – first place	1994 Hiroshima	1500 m
Gold medal – first place	1998 Bangkok	1500 m
Gold medal – first place	1998 Bangkok	5000 m
Asian Championships
Gold medal – first place	1991 Kuala Lumpur	1500 m
Gold medal – first place	1991 Kuala Lumpur	5000 m
Gold medal – first place	1995 Jakarta	1500 m
Gold medal – first place	1998 Fukuoka	1500 m
Gold medal – first place	2000 Jakarta	1500 m
Silver medal – second place	1995 Jakarta	800 m
Bronze medal – third place	1989 New Delhi	1500 m
Bronze medal – third place	1989 New Delhi	3000 m st.
Bronze medal – third place	2000 Jakarta	5000 m

Mohammad Ahmed Suleiman (Arabic: محمد أحمد سليمان; born 23 November 1969) is a Qatari middle-distance runner that won Qatar its first Olympic medal ever.

== Career ==
Suleiman was born in doha qatar "Investing in sporting success as a domestic and foreign policy tool: the case of Qatar." International journal of sport policy and politics.

At the age of 18, Suleiman participated in the Olympic Games in Seoul over 1500 metres. However, he did not progress to the semi-finals. In 1991, Suleiman qualified for the World Championships in Tokyo, where he came in ninth.

In 1992, he achieved the greatest success of his career when he won the bronze medal in the Barcelona Olympics thus becoming the first-ever Olympic medallist for Qatar. Throughout his career, Suleiman ran several Asian records over 1500 m and the mile run.

He won the gold medal in the 1500 m representing Asia at the 1992 IAAF World Cup. Suleiman ran for Qatar at two further Olympic Games (in 1996 and 2000) and reached the event finals, although he did not make the podium.
