= Steve Cram =

British retired track and field athlete

Steve Cram CBE
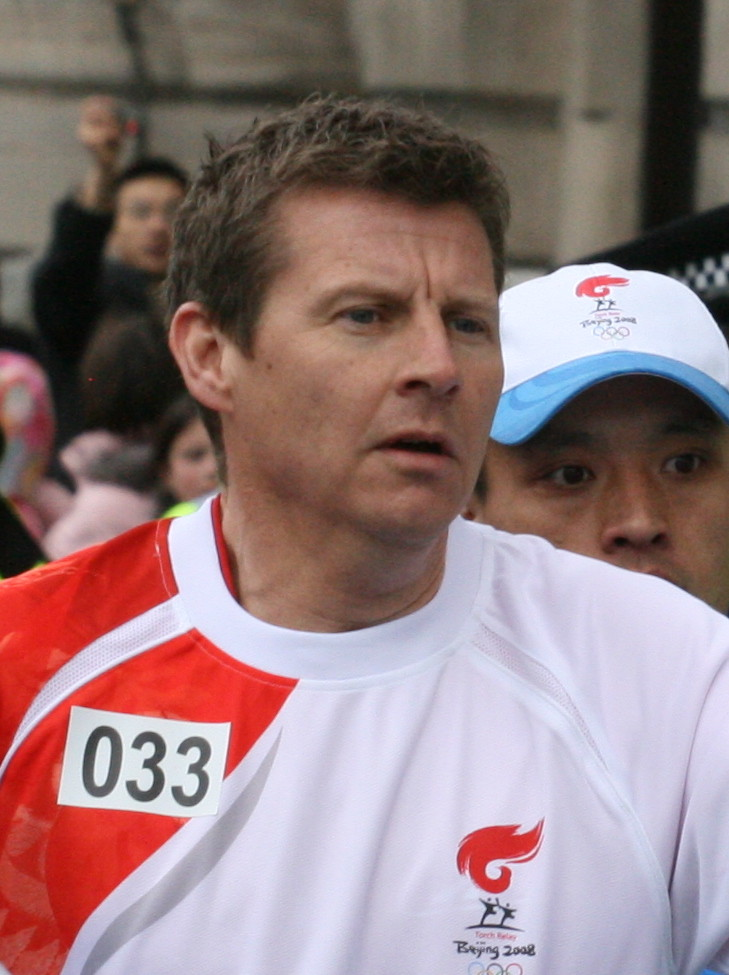
- Steve Cram while carrying the Torch for the 2008 Summer Olympics as it passes through Whitehall in London.

Personal information
- Full name: Stephen Cram
- Nickname: The Jarrow Arrow
- Born: 14 October 1960 (age 65) Gateshead, England
- Height: 6 ft 1 in (185 cm)
- Weight: 10 st 12 lb (69 kg)

Sport
- Sport: Track
- Events: 1500 metres, Mile
- Club: Jarrow and Hebburn AC

Achievements and titles
- Personal bests: 800 metres: 1:42.88; 1500 metres: 3:29.67; Mile: 3:46.32; 3000 metres: 7:43.1; 2-mile: 8:14.93; 5000 metres: 13:28.58
Medal record
Men's athletics
Representing Great Britain
Olympic Games
Silver medal – second place	1984 Los Angeles	1500 m
World Championships
Gold medal – first place	1983 Helsinki	1500 m
European Championships
Gold medal – first place	1982 Athens	1500 m
Gold medal – first place	1986 Stuttgart	1500 m
Bronze medal – third place	1986 Stuttgart	800 m
Representing England
Commonwealth Games
Gold medal – first place	1982 Brisbane	1500 m
Gold medal – first place	1986 Edinburgh	800 m
Gold medal – first place	1986 Edinburgh	1500 m

Stephen Cram, CBE (born 14 October 1960) is a British retired track and field athlete. Along with fellow Britons Sebastian Coe and Steve Ovett, he was one of the world's dominant middle-distance runners during the 1980s. Nicknamed "The Jarrow Arrow", after his home town, Cram set world records in the 1,500 m, 2,000 m, and the mile during a 19-day period in the summer of 1985. He was the first man to run 1,500 m under 3 minutes and 30 seconds. He won the 1,500 m gold medal at the 1983 World Championships and the 1,500 m silver medal at the 1984 Olympic Games.

In 2000, Cram co-founded international children's charity COCO (Comrades of Children Overseas) with British Army Major Jim Panton after running the Bosnia Comrades ultramarathon in 1998. Cram remains chairman of COCO, an organisation which currently provides education to children living in poor, remote parts of East Africa.

In 2008, Cram was appointed Chancellor of the University of Sunderland, replacing Lord Puttnam, and in 2009 was elected as President of Jarrow & Hebburn Athletics Club.

Cram now works as a television presenter and athletics commentator, motivational speaker and athletics coach. In 2021, he was elected as the new president of the British Orienteering Federation.

== Athletics career ==
In 1980, Cram won his place in the British Olympic team after finishing in 2nd place to Steve Ovett in the mile at Crystal Palace. The race had been marked as a run-off between Cram and Scottish miler Graham Williamson for the final place (a selection decision which was severely criticised by Ovett in his 1984 autobiography). Cram, aged 19, reached the final of the 1,500 m at the 1980 Moscow Olympic Games, in which Ovett and Sebastian Coe famously vied for the gold medal. Cram finished in eighth place.

Capitalising on his Olympic experience, Cram made his major breakthrough in 1982, a year in which Coe and Ovett were largely absent with injuries. Cram took 1,500 m gold at the Commonwealth Games and also the 1982 European Championships in Athens, where he raced to gold after breaking from the field with 600 metres to go following Williamson's fall.

Injury had disrupted Cram in the early part of the 1983 season, but he recovered in time for the 1983 World Championships in Helsinki and just prior to the games beat Coe (who was suffering from an undiagnosed virus at the time) in an 800 m at Gateshead. In a slow final, he strategically beat a large field following Saïd Aouita's break with 500 metres to go. Ovett became trapped in the pack, ultimately finishing fourth, while Cram outkicked Steve Scott and Aouita in the last 200 metres. In a remark made in Cram's presence shortly afterwards which spoke to the depth of British milers, Ovett noted that Britain was the home of the Olympic champion, World champion and World Record holder in the 1,500 m - titles held by Coe, Cram and Ovett respectively.

At Crystal Palace later that summer, Cram won an epic mile race, in which he led Ovett by little more than a metre with 300 metres to go and maintained that lead right to the finishing line. In a 2006 interview, Cram described the race: "It was a cat-and-mouse affair - we both started off running at the back of the field. I beat him by little more than the thickness of a vest."

In 1984, Cram's season was severely hampered by injury, although he recovered sufficiently to win silver in the 1,500 m at the 1984 Olympic Games in Los Angeles, behind defending champion Coe.

He came back stronger in 1985, a year in which he was only beaten three times; by Coe at 800 m, McKean at 800 m and Ovett in a road Mile. In the 800 m, not his best event, he beat the reigning 800 m Olympic Champion, Joaquim Cruz, in 1:42.88, the fastest time he was ever to run, off even splits of 51.2 & 51.7. He broke three world records (1,500 m, Mile, 2,000 m) within a 19-day span, and recorded a British All Comers Record over the 1,000 m, running 2:12.88 in windy conditions at Gateshead (the second fastest 1,000 m in history at the time behind Coe's 2:12.18, and now 3rd to Noah Ngeny's 2:11.98). He was the first man to run under 3:30.00 for the 1,500 m, just beating Saïd Aouita in Nice (running 3:29.67 to Aouita's 3:29.71). His mile time of 3:46.32, recorded at the Bislett Stadium in Oslo, stood for eight years and, stood as the European record until 2023 when Jakob Ingebrigtsen ran 3:43.73. This run was notable for the fact that this was an actual competitive race against Sebastian Coe with the first three laps being below schedule, although pretty even in pace distribution (57.2, 57.3, 58.7), followed by an exceptional last lap (440yds) of 53.2.

While the likes of Coe and Ovett had a devastating sprint finish over the last 100 metres, Cram tended to wind up the speed gradually over the last 300 metres of races. However, during the 1985 season he said that he could win from any position and happily ran near the back of world class fields before unleashing his kick, often with a lap or so to go.

Cram's good form continued into the 1986 season. At the 1986 Commonwealth Games in Edinburgh, he won the 800 m, finishing 15 metres clear of Tom McKean and Peter Elliott in 1:43:22 - still the Commonwealth Games record. He followed this up with gold in the 1,500 m and was persuaded to run both events at the 1986 European Championships in Stuttgart. He arrived at the European Championships "just over the edge" as he suggested in David Miller's biography of Coe, "Born to Run". Nevertheless, he won the bronze in the 800 m having been blocked down the back straight by Tom McKean who made his run at the same time as Cram and, though leading into the straight, lacked the zest he showed in the Commonwealth games and was unable to hold off the challenges of McKean and a superlative Coe. Although disappointed by his 800 m defeat Cram bounced back to beat Coe to the gold medal in the 1,500 m. It turned out to be not only Cram's last major medal, but the end of the golden era for British middle-distance running.

In 1987, he was no longer the outstanding 1,500 m athlete that he had been in previous years. Having previously been able to win races from any position and at any pace, he was now lacking confidence in his finishing speed, an area in which he had fallen behind some of his main rivals. He was beaten by José Luis González in the European Cup, and although he followed that with an impressive win in the 1,000 m in Stockholm, and won the Dream Mile for the third year running, he finished eighth after leading into the final bend of the 1987 World Championships final in Rome. He had said before the race that his only hope of victory was a fast race, in which he could run the finish out of his opponents, in particular Abdi Bile, the eventual winner. Unhappily for Cram, the pace was slow, and he faded badly in the last 100 metres.

His 1988 season saw him return to better form and he beat Bile in the Oslo Dream Mile in 1988 - his fourth consecutive victory in that race. Having run impressively in the Olympic trials over 800 m and winning in 1:44.16, (opening up an eight-metre gap over Tom McKean in a sprint down the home straight) he was touted as one of the favourites to win the gold medal over 1,500 m at the Seoul Olympics in 1988 until a calf injury just before the games in a 1000 m race hampered his progress. The injury affected his performance at the games and he was eliminated in the heats of the 800 m. He recovered sufficiently to reach the final of the 1,500 m, but could finish only fourth in a close race surprisingly won by Peter Rono.

Injury dogged him throughout his remaining years and although he continued to compete for some time, he never again looked likely to win a major championship. In the 1990 European Athletics Championships, he still finished fifth in the 1,500 m, but in the 1991 World Athletics Championships, he was eliminated in the 1,500 m semi-finals.

He retired from athletics in 1994, and remains the UK record holder over the 2,000 m, with his UK mile record of 3:46.32 having been broken by Josh Kerr in 2024, in a time of 3:45.34.

Cram was the coach of middle-distance runners Laura Weightman, Thomas Lancashire and Ross Murray. In April 2014 Cram joined British Athletics as an adviser and mentor in the run-up to the 2016 Summer Olympics.

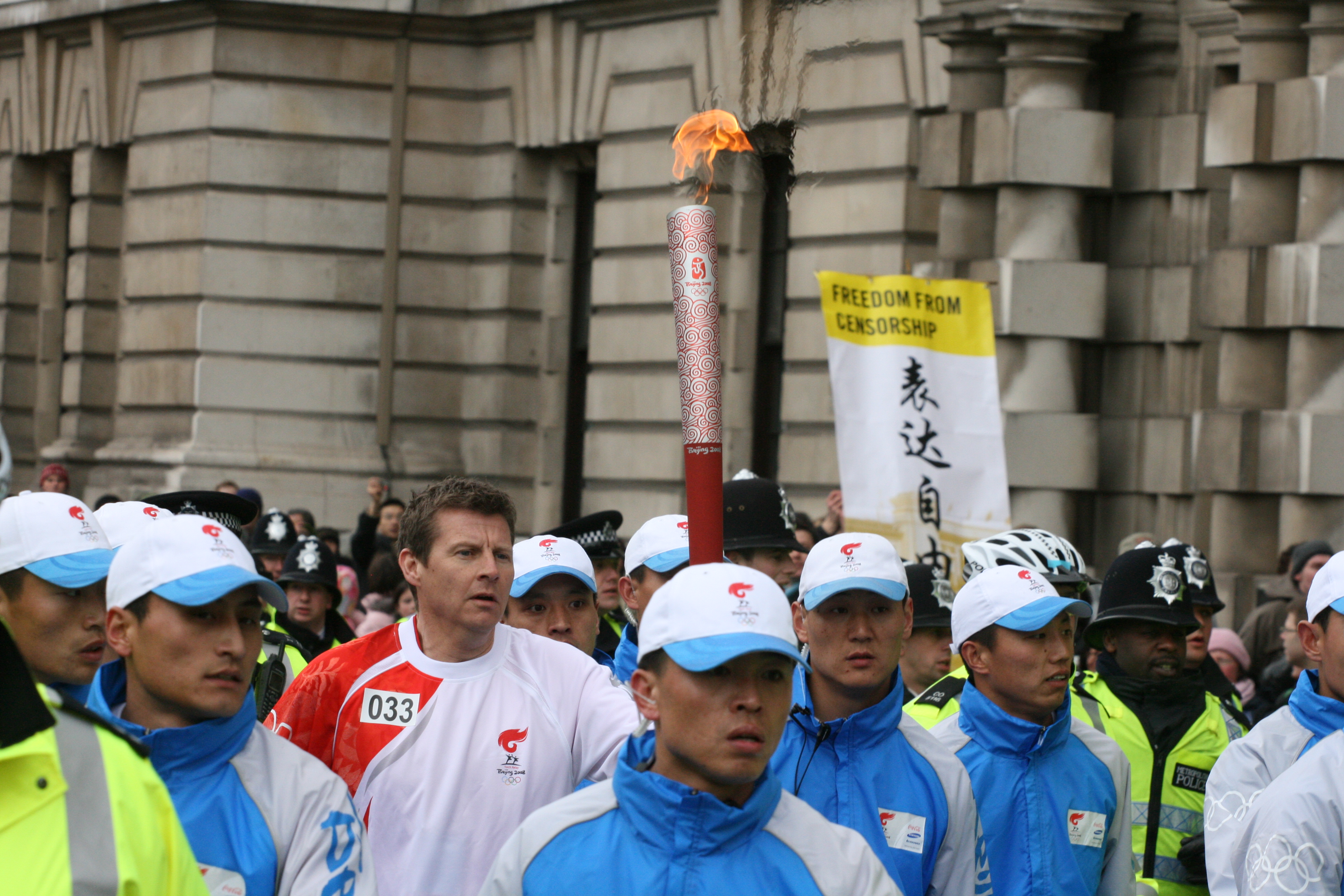
Cram carries the Olympic Torch for the 2008 Summer Olympics down Whitehall in London surrounded by Police and Olympic officials on 6 April 2008

== Television career ==
Cram now works as a television presenter and athletics commentator predominantly for BBC Sport and as a motivational speaker. He participated in Prince Edward's 1987 charity television special The Grand Knockout Tournament. Cram starred alongside UK Olympic Gold medalists Sally Gunnell and Adam Eason in BBC's 2006 primetime TV series Run for Glory, helping the runners and participants overcome psychological barriers to running the London Marathon.

Cram has commentated on athletics events for the BBC since 1999.

At the Atlanta 1996 Olympics, Cram worked for BBC Radio 5 Live. For the Sydney 2000 Olympics, Cram presented coverage throughout the day and commentated on athletics events. At the Athens 2004 Summer Olympics, Cram anchored morning coverage of the Games with Hazel Irvine. For the Beijing 2008 Games, Cram had joined the commentary team for athletics events. This was a position he took again for the London 2012 Games, leading the commentary team. He returned to the same position for the Rio 2016 Olympics, Tokyo 2020 Games and Paris 2024 Olympics.

Cram has also worked on multiple Commonwealth Games for the BBC. Cram commentated on the athletics events on the Manchester 2002 Games. At the Melbourne 2006 Games, Cram presented and reported from multiple sports. He returned to the commentary box for the following games: Delhi 2010, Glasgow 2014, Gold Coast 2018 and Birmingham 2022.

Cram was one of the main presenters of the BBC's coverage of the Salt Lake City 2002 Winter Olympics. Four years later, Cram returned to present and report on the Turin 2006 Games. For the Vancouver 2010 Olympics, Cram replaced Dougie Donnelly as the main Curling commentator, working alongside Rhona Martin. This was a position he returned to for the Sochi 2014 Games, this time alongside Jackie Lockhart. For the Pyeongchang 2018 Olympics, Cram returned again with Martin, Lockhart, Logan Gray and David Murdoch. Cram once again commentated on the curling events at the Beijing 2022 Olympics, with Martin, Lockhart and Gray. Cram returned as the lead curling commentator for the 2026 Milano Cortina Olympics, alongside Lockhart, Gray and Vicky Wright.

== Personal life ==
Cram's mother Marie was born in Germany and he considered representing Germany because of the dominance of Coe and Ovett. Cram was married to Karen for many years, but they divorced in 2006 and since then he has lived with former athlete Allison Curbishley in Northumberland. He has two children, Josie and Marcus, who have had some success in under-age races. Cram had a younger brother Kevin, who died in a fall aged 39 while out for a run in Cardiff in 2001.

== Awards ==
Cram was voted BBC Sports Personality of the Year in 1983. He was appointed Member of the Order of the British Empire (MBE) in 1986 and Commander of the Order of the British Empire (CBE) in the 2015 New Year Honours for services to sport.

== Personal bests ==
Distance	Mark	Date
800 m	1:42.88	1985
1000 m	2:12.88	1985
1500 m	3:29.67	1985
Mile	3:46.32	1985
2000 m NR	4:51.39	1985
2 Miles	8:14.93	1983
5000 m	13:28.58	1989
Marathon	2:35:44	1999

Records
Preceded by (United Kingdom) Steve Ovett	Men's 1,500 m World Record Holder; 16 July 1985 – 23 August 1985	Succeeded by (Morocco) Saïd Aouita
Preceded by (United Kingdom) Sebastian Coe	Men's Mile World Record Holder; 27 July 1985 – 5 September 1993	Succeeded by (Algeria) Noureddine Morceli
Preceded by (United Kingdom) Steve Ovett	European Record Holder Men's 1500m 16 July 1985 – 12 August 1997	Succeeded by (Spain) Fermín Cacho
Awards and achievements
Preceded by Carl Lewis	United Press International; Athlete of the Year; 1985	Succeeded by Diego Maradona
Academic offices
Preceded by The Lord Puttnam	Chancellor of the University of Sunderland; 2008–Present	Incumbent
