= David Campbell (runner) =

Canadian middle-distance runner

Personal information
- Born: 31 August 1960 (age 65) Halifax, Nova Scotia, Canada
- Height: 177 cm (5 ft 10 in)
- Weight: 65 kg (143 lb)

Sport
- Country: Canada
- Sport: Middle-distance running
Medal record
Representing Canada
Commonwealth Games
Bronze medal – third place	1986 Edinburgh	1500m

David Campbell is a Canadian Olympic middle-distance runner. He represented his country in the men's 1500 meters at the 1988 Summer Olympics. His time was a 3:42.97 in the first heat.
