= Jim Spivey =

American middle-distance runner

Personal information
- Nationality: American
- Born: March 7, 1960 (age 66) Schiller Park, Illinois, U.S.
- Height: 5 ft 10 in (178 cm)
- Weight: 134 lb (61 kg)

Sport
- Sport: Track
- Events: 1500 meters, 3000 meters, 5000 meters
- College team: Indiana

Achievements and titles
- Personal bests: 800 meters: 1:46.5; 1500 meters: 3:31.01; Mile: 3:49.80; 2-mile: 8:24.14; 5000 meters: 13:15.86
Medal record
Men's Athletics
Representing United States
World Championships
Bronze medal – third place	1987 Rome	1500 m
Pan American Games
Silver medal – second place	1987 Indianapolis	1500 m

James Calvin Spivey (born March 7, 1960, in Schiller Park, Illinois) is an American former middle-distance runner and Olympian. Spivey took up competitive running in Illinois where he became one of the best high school runners from his state. He was the 1982 NCAA DI men's 1500-meter champion with Indiana University. Spivey enjoyed a long Olympic career, in which he participated in the Olympic Summer Games in 1984, 1992, and 1996.

== Running career ==
=== High school ===
Spivey began running competitively in 1975 as a sophomore in cross country and on the track at Fenton High School in Bensenville, Illinois. He was runner-up at state cross country his junior and senior year, running 14:00 for three miles at the Illinois State course in Peoria, Illinois. In Track and Field he was a state qualifier in the two-mile his sophomore year, was runner-up in the two-mile his junior year in 9:00.5, and state champion in the half mile his senior year. His times of 1:50.2 880 yards was the #1 ranked high school time in the country; and mile of 4:06.2 was the 2nd fastest high schooler for 1978.

=== Collegiate ===
Spivey attended Indiana University from 1978 to 1983. In 1982 he was the NCAA champion in the men's 1500 meters. During his college career, Spivey's training fluctuated seasonally to adjust to cross country in the fall and track in the winter and spring; his weekly mileage ranged from under 40 to over 80 miles depending on his race schedule.

=== International ===
In 1984, he also won the Olympic Trials and placed 5th in the Los Angeles Olympic Games. His time of 3:36.06 was the fastest run by an American in the Olympic final until the 2012 London Olympic Games in which Leo Manzano ran 3:34.90 to claim 2nd place.

His greatest success came at the World Championships in Rome 1987 over 1500 m where he won a bronze medal. He also won the silver medal at the 1987 Pan American Games in Indianapolis, Indiana. The following year, however, Spivey failed to qualify for the 1988 Summer Olympics (finishing fourth at the US trials in Indianapolis) in the same season in which he set his personal best over 1500 m (3:31.01, Koblenz).

In 1992 Spivey won the US Olympic trials 1500 meters in New Orleans ahead of Steve Holman to qualify for the Olympic Games in Barcelona, where he came eighth.

In 1996 Spivey competed in the Olympic 5000m competition in Atlanta, where he was a semi-finalist with a 14:27.72. He also currently holds the American record for the 2,000 m at 4:52.44 set in Lausanne, Switzerland in 1987. His personal bests include 1:46.5 800 m 1982 San Francisco; 2:16.05 1000 meters 1984 Eugene, Oregon; 3:49.80 mile 1986 Oslo, Norway; 7:37.07 3000 m 1993 Cologne, West Germany and 13:15.86 5000 meters 1994 Berlin, Germany at age 34. He was a member of the 1983 Helsinki, Finland; 1987 Rome; 1991 Tokyo; 1993 Stuttgart, Germany and 1995 Gothenburg, Sweden USA World Championship teams.

== Coaching ==
Spivey was the head coach of men and women cross-country and track and field at the University of Chicago from 1997 to 2001, and had 13 all-Americans of the athletic department's 24 during that time. One individual won four NCAA Division III titles in 1999–2000. From 2001 to 2005, he was the head women's cross-country coach/assistant track and field coach at Vanderbilt University, including being able to coach to SEC champions and one all-American in the 5000 meter run.

As a college coach, Spivey used a series of quotes to motivate his athletes. He would say, "Sit in the chair" to explain the importance of trusting the coach. "No deposit, no return" signified that desirable results in the championship end of the season would only come with hard work early on in the season. "The hay is in the barn" was used during the championship end of the season to remind the athletes that they'd already done all the work they could do and now was time to reap the benefits. The phrases "Reach out and slap a hand," "People in the Sears Tower would pay to run with you guys" and "It's great to be alive" were all used to motivate athletes during hard workouts. Additionally, he often used the call and response, "Hip hip?" "Hooray!" during particularly grueling workouts. His running idol was Sebastian Coe.

He currently lives in Wheaton, Illinois, and works for ASICS America corporation since 2006. He moved over from Team Sales to Sports Marketing in May 2018, working with college and other sponsored programs throughout the United States. He started the Jim Spivey Running Club in 1990. He helped coach Wheaton Academy high school in West Chicago for 4 years, the boys' and girls' cross country teams and assistant role in track. He is presently a volunteer coach for the girls' cross country and track teams at Wheaton North in Wheaton, Il. Also, one of his form mid-1990 JSRC runners is the head coach at Latin High School in downtown Chicago. Coach Dan Daly asked Jim to help him coach his boys' and girls' cross country and track teams, beginning in August 2017 - The partnership with Jim writing the training and Dan implementing the workouts, to have Dan's first ever Illinois State Champion in the 1600m run in May 2018, a freshman who ran 4:56. He also coaches individuals and high school groups during the off-season, and gives motivational speeches and coaching clinics. Jim's signature is handing out half-sticks of gum to his runners after the workout.

== Personal bests ==
- 800 m -- 1:46.5 (1982)
- 1000 m -- 2:16.54 (1984)
- 1500 m -- 3:31.01 (1988)
- Mile—3:49.80 (1986)
- 2000 m -- 4:52.44 (1987, American record)
- 3000 m -- 7:37.04 (1993)
- 5000 m -- 13:15.86 (1994)

Source: TrackandFieldNews.com
