= Peter Rono =

Kenyan middle-distance runner

Personal information
- Born: 31 July 1967 (age 59) Kapsabet, Kenya

Sport
- Sport: Track and field
Medal record
Representing Kenya
Olympic Games
Gold medal – first place	1988 Seoul	1500 m
Summer Universiade
Silver medal – second place	1989 Duisburg	1500 m

Peter Kipchumba Rono (born 31 July 1967) is a former Kenyan athlete, who won the 1,500 metres at the 1988 Summer Olympics.

== Career ==
Born in Kamobo village, near Kapsabet, Rono won the gold medal at the Africa Cross Country Championships in Nairobi, Kenya, in 1985 and in 1986 he was the silver medallist in the 1500m at the World Junior Championships in Athens, Greece. In 1987, he was a semi-finalist in the 1500m at the World Championships in Rome, Italy.

He attended St. Patrick's High School, Iten where he was trained by Brother Colm O'Connell, an Irish Patrician missionary and headmaster of the school at that time.

At the 1988 Olympic Games, Rono managed to closely defeat the main favourites, Peter Elliott and Steve Cram of Great Britain, thus becoming the youngest Olympic Champion at 1500 m (21 years and 62 days).

Rono never won a major race again. He earned his bachelor's degree and master's degree from Mount Saint Mary's University in Maryland, while competing, and later coaching, for the institution.

Peter Rono currently lives in New Jersey, USA where he is employed by the sales and marketing department of the shoe manufacturer New Balance. He is married to Mary Kirui, a runner who won 10,000 metres bronze medal at the 1987 All-Africa Games held in Nairobi, Kenya. They have five children, Irene Rono, Winnie Rono, Patrick Rono, Cynthia Rono and Nosheena Kurui. Their son Patrick Rono attended the University of Arkansas. Their daughter Irene is also a runner.

== Achievements ==
Year	Competition	Venue	Position	Event	Notes
Representing Kenya
1986	World Junior Championships	Athens, Greece	2nd	1500m	3:45.52
1986	World Junior Championships	Athens, Greece	14th	5000m	14:20.03
