= 1988 European Athletics Indoor Championships – Men's 3000 metres =

The men's 3000 metres event at the 1988 European Athletics Indoor Championships was held on 5 and 6 March.

== Medalists ==
| Gold | Silver | Bronze |
|---|---|---|
| José Luis González; Spain | Markus Hacksteiner; Switzerland | Mikhail Dasko; Soviet Union |

== Results ==
=== Heats ===
First 4 from each heat (Q) and the next 3 fastest (q) qualified for the final.

| Rank | Heat | Name | Nationality | Time | Notes |
|---|---|---|---|---|---|
| 1 | 2 | Markus Hacksteiner | Switzerland | 8:07.51 | Q |
| 2 | 2 | Mário Silva | Portugal | 8:07.54 | Q |
| 3 | 2 | Mikhail Dasko | Soviet Union | 8:07.57 | Q |
| 4 | 2 | Mogens Guldberg | Denmark | 8:07.69 | Q |
| 5 | 2 | Nick O'Brien | Ireland | 8:07.75 | q |
| 6 | 2 | Radim Kunčický | Czechoslovakia | 8:10.83 | q |
| 7 | 2 | Anacleto Jiménez | Spain | 8:11.41 | q |
| 8 | 2 | Béla Vágó | Hungary | 8:11.69 | q |
| 9 | 1 | Ranieri Carenza | Italy | 8:18.31 | Q |
| 10 | 1 | José Luis González | Spain | 8:18.67 | Q |
| 11 | 1 | Gábor Markó | Hungary | 8:19.39 | Q |
| 12 | 1 | Mike Hawkins | Great Britain | 8:20.32 | Q |
| 13 | 1 | Panagiotis Fotiou | Greece | 8:26.42 | |
| 14 | 1 | Peter Van de Kerkhove | Belgium | 8:32.49 | |
| | 1 | Jacky Carlier | France | DNF | |
| | 1 | Branko Zorko | Yugoslavia | DNS | |

=== Final ===
| Rank | Name | Nationality | Time | Notes |
|---|---|---|---|---|
| 1st place, gold medalist(s) | José Luis González | Spain | 7:55.29 | |
| 2nd place, silver medalist(s) | Markus Hacksteiner | Switzerland | 7:56.04 | |
| 3rd place, bronze medalist(s) | Mikhail Dasko | Soviet Union | 7:56.51 | |
| 4 | Mogens Guldberg | Denmark | 7:57.68 | |
| 5 | Mike Hawkins | Great Britain | 7:58.42 | |
| 6 | Mário Silva | Portugal | 7:58.95 | |
| 7 | Anacleto Jiménez | Spain | 7:59.25 | |
| 8 | Ranieri Carenza | Italy | 8:03.18 | |
| 9 | Nick O'Brien | Ireland | 8:13.73 | |
| 10 | Gábor Markó | Hungary | 8:15.34 | |
| 11 | Béla Vágó | Hungary | 8:17.72 | |
| | Radim Kunčický | Czechoslovakia | DQ | |
