= 1989 IAAF World Indoor Championships – Men's 3000 metres =

The men's 3000 metres event at the 1989 IAAF World Indoor Championships was held at the Budapest Sportcsarnok in Budapest on 4 and 5 March.

== Medalists ==
| Gold | Silver | Bronze |
|---|---|---|
| Saïd Aouita; Morocco | José Luís González; Spain | Dieter Baumann; West Germany |

== Results ==
=== Heats ===
First 4 of each heat (Q) and next 2 fastest (q) qualified for the final.

| Rank | Heat | Name | Nationality | Time | Notes |
|---|---|---|---|---|---|
| 1 | 1 | Dieter Baumann | West Germany | 7:50.22 | Q, CR |
| 2 | 1 | Branko Zorko | Yugoslavia | 7:50.99 | Q, NR |
| 3 | 1 | Stefano Mei | Italy | 7:51.48 | Q |
| 4 | 1 | José Luís González | Spain | 7:51.52 | Q |
| 5 | 2 | Saïd Aouita | Morocco | 7:51.72 | Q |
| 6 | 1 | Mikhail Dasko | Soviet Union | 7:51.83 | q |
| 7 | 2 | José Luis Carreira | Spain | 7:51.98 | Q, PB |
| 8 | 2 | Doug Padilla | United States | 7:52.00 | Q |
| 9 | 2 | Frank O'Mara | Ireland | 7:52.37 | Q |
| 10 | 1 | Brian Abshire | United States | 7:52.52 | q |
| 11 | 2 | Klaus-Peter Nabein | West Germany | 7:53.15 | PB |
| 12 | 1 | Jacky Carlier | France | 7:53.16 | |
| 13 | 1 | Gerry O'Reilly | Ireland | 7:53.32 | |
| 14 | 2 | Peter Wirz | Switzerland | 7:53.70 | |
| 15 | 2 | Rémy Geoffroy | France | 7:53.91 | |
| 16 | 2 | Mohamed Choumassi | Morocco | 7:55.58 | |
| 17 | 1 | Adauto Domingues | Brazil | 7:56.76 | NR |
| 18 | 2 | Nikos Vouzis | Greece | 7:59.92 | |
| 19 | 2 | Béla Vágó | Hungary | 8:05.78 | |

=== Final ===
| Rank | Name | Nationality | Time | Notes |
|---|---|---|---|---|
| 1st place, gold medalist(s) | Saïd Aouita | Morocco | 7:47.94 | CR |
| 2nd place, silver medalist(s) | José Luís González | Spain | 7:48.66 | |
| 3rd place, bronze medalist(s) | Dieter Baumann | West Germany | 7:50.47 | |
| 4 | Doug Padilla | United States | 7:50.93 | |
| 5 | Frank O'Mara | Ireland | 7:52.21 | |
| 6 | Branko Zorko | Yugoslavia | 7:52.26 | |
| 7 | José Luis Carreira | Spain | 7:53.22 | |
| 8 | Stefano Mei | Italy | 7:53.73 | |
| 9 | Brian Abshire | United States | 7:53.93 | |
| 10 | Mikhail Dasko | Soviet Union | 7:54.80 | |
