= 1989 IAAF World Indoor Championships – Men's 1500 metres =

The men's 1500 metres event at the 1989 IAAF World Indoor Championships was held at the Budapest Sportcsarnok in Budapest on 4 and 5 March.

== Medalists ==
Gold	Silver	Bronze
Marcus O'Sullivan; Ireland	Hauke Fuhlbrügge; East Germany	Jeff Atkinson; United States

== Results ==
=== Heats ===
First 2 of each heat (Q) and next 4 fastest (q) qualified for the final.

Rank	Heat	Name	Nationality	Time	Notes
1	3	Hauke Fuhlbrügge	East Germany	3:42.26	Q
2	3	Eckhardt Rüter	West Germany	3:42.65	Q
3	3	Hervé Phélippeau	France	3:42.79	q
4	2	Sergey Afanasyev	Soviet Union	3:42.83	Q
5	2	Manuel Pancorbo	Spain	3:42.84	Q
5	3	Sydney Maree	United States	3:42.84	q
7	2	Radim Kuncický	Czechoslovakia	3:43.19	q
8	3	Feranswa Woldemariam	Ethiopia	3:43.35	q, NR
9	3	Adelino Hidalgo	Spain	3:43.95	
10	3	Róbert Banai	Hungary	3:43.99	
11	2	Agberto Guimarães	Brazil	3:44.86	
12	2	László Tóth	Hungary	3:44.99	
13	3	Dave Reid	Canada	3:45.87	
14	1	Marcus O'Sullivan	Ireland	3:47.34	Q
15	1	Jeff Atkinson	United States	3:47.62	Q
16	1	Mário Silva	Portugal	3:47.92	
17	1	Abdelaziz Sahere	Morocco	3:48.14	
18	2	Hamid Sajjadi	Iran	3:48.32	NR
19	1	Vladimir Kolpakov	Soviet Union	3:48.33	
20	1	Mbiganyi Thee	Botswana	3:48.85	
21	1	Doug Consiglio	Canada	3:50.50	
22	1	Nikolaos Tsiakoulas	Greece	3:52.05	

=== Final ===
Rank	Name	Nationality	Time	Notes
1st place, gold medalist(s)	Marcus O'Sullivan	Ireland	3:36.64	CR
2nd place, silver medalist(s)	Hauke Fuhlbrügge	East Germany	3:37.80	NR
3rd place, bronze medalist(s)	Jeff Atkinson	United States	3:38.12	AR
4	Sydney Maree	United States	3:38.14	
5	Hervé Phélippeau	France	3:38.76	
6	Radim Kuncický	Czechoslovakia	3:39.97	
7	Sergey Afanasyev	Soviet Union	3:40.46	
8	Manuel Pancorbo	Spain	3:41.61	
9	Eckhardt Rüter	West Germany	3:43.42	
10	Feranswa Woldemariam	Ethiopia	3:44.16	
