= 1993 IAAF World Indoor Championships – Men's 1500 metres =

The men's 1500 metres event at the 1993 IAAF World Indoor Championships was held on 12 and 13 March.

== Medalists ==
Gold	Silver	Bronze
Marcus O'Sullivan; Ireland	David Strang; Great Britain	Branko Zorko; Croatia

== Results ==
=== Heats ===
First 4 of each heat (Q) and next 2 fastest (q) qualified for the final.

Rank	Heat	Name	Nationality	Time	Notes
1	2	David Strang	Great Britain	3:41.88	Q
2	2	Steve Holman	United States	3:41.96	Q, PB
3	1	Marcus O'Sullivan	Ireland	3:42.31	Q
4	2	Branko Zorko	Croatia	3:42.37	Q
5	1	Mickaël Damian	France	3:42.46	Q
6	1	Robin van Helden	Netherlands	3:42.62	Q
7	1	Marc Corstjens	Belgium	3:42.63	Q
8	1	Bill Burke	United States	3:42.68	q
9	2	Rachid El Basir	Morocco	3:42.99	Q
10	1	Mário Silva	Portugal	3:43.59	q
11	2	Edgar de Oliveira	Brazil	3:44.32	
12	1	Mohamed Taki	Morocco	3:44.45	
13	2	Spyros Christopoulos	Greece	3:44.46	
14	2	Kevin Sullivan	Canada	3:44.52	
15	1	Milan Drahoňovský	Czech Republic	3:46.21	
16	2	Amos Rota	Italy	3:47.13	
17	2	Vénuste Niyongabo	Burundi	3:48.92	
18	1	Sipho Dlamini	Swaziland	3:52.44	NR
19	2	Atoi Boru	Kenya	3:54.99	
	1	Phillimon Hanneck	Zimbabwe	DNS	

=== Final ===
Rank	Name	Nationality	Time	Notes
1st place, gold medalist(s)	Marcus O'Sullivan	Ireland	3:45.00	
2nd place, silver medalist(s)	David Strang	Great Britain	3:45.30	
3rd place, bronze medalist(s)	Branko Zorko	Croatia	3:45.39	
4	Steve Holman	United States	3:45.59	
5	Mickaël Damian	France	3:45.59	
6	Bill Burke	United States	3:46.18	
7	Mário Silva	Portugal	3:46.61	
8	Marc Corstjens	Belgium	3:46.69	
9	Rachid El Basir	Morocco	3:46.81	
10	Robin van Helden	Netherlands	3:50.09	
