= Athletics at the 1990 Commonwealth Games – Men's 800 metres =

Men's 800 metres at the Commonwealth Games

The men's 800 metres event at the 1990 Commonwealth Games was held at the Mount Smart Stadium in Auckland on 29 January and 1 February 1990.

The winning margin was 0.02 seconds which as of 2024 remains the only time the men's 800 metres was won by less than 0.05 seconds at these games.

== Medalists ==
Gold	Silver	Bronze
Sammy Tirop; Kenya	Nixon Kiprotich; Kenya	Matthew Yates; England

== Results ==
=== Heats ===
Qualification: First four of each heat (Q) and the next two fastest (q) qualified for the semifinals.

Rank	Heat	Name	Nationality	Time	Notes
1	1	Sammy Tirop	Kenya	1:48.60	Q
2	3	Robert Kibet	Kenya	1:49.16	Q
3	3	Matthew Yates	England	1:49.24	Q
4	1	Sebastian Coe	England	1:49.83	Q
4	2	Nixon Kiprotich	Kenya	1:49.83	Q
6	1	David Strang	Scotland	1:49.92	Q
7	1	Melford Homela	Zimbabwe	1:49.97	Q
8	1	John Walker	New Zealand	1:50.09	q
9	2	Ikem Billy	England	1:50.32	Q
10	3	Mike Birke	Canada	1:50.36	Q
11	4	Mbiganyi Thee	Botswana	1:50.71	Q
12	3	Michael Craig	New Zealand	1:50.81	Q
13	2	Brian Whittle	Scotland	1:50.87	Q
14	1	Neil Horsfield	Wales	1:50.88	q
15	4	Tom McKean	Scotland	1:50.87	Q
16	2	Paul Osland	Canada	1:51.00	Q
17	3	Kenneth Dzekedzeke	Malawi	1:51.17	
18	3	Samson Vellabouy	Malaysia	1:51.19	
19	4	Simon Doyle	Australia	1:51.21	Q
20	2	Zacharia Machangani	Botswana	1:51.41	
21	4	Simon Hoogewerf	Canada	1:52.00	Q
22	2	Mark Kirk	Northern Ireland	1:52.09	
23	2	Alick Musukuma	Zambia	1:52.18	
24	1	Mohammad Hossain Milzer	Bangladesh	1:52.44	
25	4	Paul Breed	New Zealand	1:52.92	
26	4	Philip Sinon	Seychelles	1:53.17	
27	3	John Siguria	Papua New Guinea	1:57.57	
28	4	Ancel Nalau	Vanuatu	2:00.33	

=== Semifinals ===
Qualification: First 4 of each heat (Q) and the next 1 fastest (q) qualified for the final.

Rank	Heat	Name	Nationality	Time	Notes
1	2	Tom McKean	Scotland	1:46.83	Q
2	1	Nixon Kiprotich	Kenya	1:46.92	Q
3	2	Robert Kibet	Kenya	1:47.00	Q
4	1	Sammy Tirop	Kenya	1:47.04	Q
5	2	Simon Doyle	Australia	1:47.38	Q
6	1	Brian Whittle	Scotland	1:47.51	Q
7	1	Sebastian Coe	England	1:47.67	Q
8	2	Matthew Yates	England	1:47.77	Q
9	1	Ikem Billy	England	1:47.80	q
10	1	Mbiganyi Thee	Botswana	1:48.33	
11	2	Melford Homela	Zimbabwe	1:48.53	
12	1	Paul Osland	Canada	1:48.59	
13	1	John Walker	New Zealand	1:49.60	
14	2	Mike Birke	Canada	1:49.64	
15	2	Neil Horsfield	Wales	1:49.93	
16	2	Michael Craig	New Zealand	1:51.00	
17	2	David Strang	Scotland	1:51.05	
18	1	Simon Hoogewerf	Canada	1:53.75	

=== Final ===
Rank	Name	Nationality	Time	Notes
1st place, gold medalist(s)	Sammy Tirop	Kenya	1:45.98	
2nd place, silver medalist(s)	Nixon Kiprotich	Kenya	1:46.00	
3rd place, bronze medalist(s)	Matthew Yates	England	1:46.62	
4	Brian Whittle	Scotland	1:46.85	
5	Ikem Billy	England	1:47.16	
6	Sebastian Coe	England	1:47.24	
7	Tom McKean	Scotland	1:47.27	
8	Simon Doyle	Australia	1:48.06	
9	Robert Kibet	Kenya	1:48.57	
