= 1994 European Athletics Indoor Championships – Men's 1500 metres =

The men's 1500 metres event at the 1994 European Athletics Indoor Championships was held in Palais Omnisports de Paris-Bercy on 12 and 13 March.

== Medalists ==
Gold	Silver	Bronze
David Strang; Great Britain	Branko Zorko; Croatia	Kader Chékhémani; France

== Results ==
=== Heats ===
First 2 from each heat (Q) and the next 3 fastest (q) qualified for the final.

Rank	Heat	Name	Nationality	Time	Notes
1	2	David Strang	Great Britain	3:42.27	Q
2	2	Branko Zorko	Croatia	3:42.44	Q
3	2	Milan Drahoňovský	Czech Republic	3:42.66	q
4	2	Massimo Pegoretti	Italy	3:43.15	q
5	3	Mickaël Damian	France	3:43.20	Q
6	3	Manuel Pancorbo	Spain	3:43.45	Q
7	2	Stephan Kabat	Germany	3:43.52	q
8	3	Simon Vroemen	Netherlands	3:43.61	
9	3	Michał Bartoszak	Poland	3:43.96	
10	2	Vincent Terrier	France	3:44.23	
11	3	Thorsten Kallweit	Germany	3:44.52	
12	2	Antonio Herrador	Spain	3:45.91	
13	3	Cândido Maia	Portugal	3:46.69	
14	2	Bart Meganck	Belgium	3:48.96	
15	1	Kader Chékhémani	France	3:50.23	Q
16	1	Vyacheslav Shabunin	Russia	3:50.57	Q
17	3	Matt Hibberd	Great Britain	3:50.73	
18	1	Mateo Cañellas	Spain	3:51.10	
19	1	Ian Campbell	Great Britain	3:51.10	
20	1	Rudy Vlasselaer	Belgium	3:51.76	
21	1	Robin van Helden	Netherlands	4:06.44	
	1	Mário Silva	Portugal	DNF	
	3	Michael Buchleitner	Austria	DNS	

=== Final ===
Rank	Name	Nationality	Time	Notes
1st place, gold medalist(s)	David Strang	Great Britain	3:44.57	
2nd place, silver medalist(s)	Branko Zorko	Croatia	3:44.64	
3rd place, bronze medalist(s)	Kader Chékhémani	France	3:44.65	
4	Manuel Pancorbo	Spain	3:45.03	
5	Vyacheslav Shabunin	Russia	3:45.37	
6	Mickaël Damian	France	3:45.54	
7	Massimo Pegoretti	Italy	3:46.41	
8	Milan Drahoňovský	Czech Republic	3:46.47	
9	Stephan Kabat	Germany	3:48.81	
