= 1990 European Athletics Indoor Championships – Men's 3000 metres =

The men's 3000 metres event at the 1990 European Athletics Indoor Championships was held in Kelvin Hall on 3 and 4 March.

== Medalists ==
Gold	Silver	Bronze
Éric Dubus; France	Jacky Carlier; France	Branko Zorko; Yugoslavia

== Results ==
=== Heats ===
First 4 from each heat (Q) and the next 2 fastest (q) qualified for the final.

Rank	Heat	Name	Nationality	Time	Notes
1	1	Branko Zorko	Yugoslavia	7:53.81	Q
2	1	Uwe Pflügner	East Germany	7:54.02	Q
3	1	Mikhail Dasko	Soviet Union	7:54.57	Q
4	1	Nick O'Brien	Ireland	7:54.85	Q
5	2	Éric Dubus	France	7:55.19	Q
6	2	Jacky Carlier	France	7:55.43	Q
7	2	Mário Silva	Portugal	7:56.05	Q
8	1	Zoltán Káldy	Hungary	7:56.46	q
9	2	Ian Hamer	Great Britain	7:57.91	Q
10	1	Adelino Hidalgo	Spain	7:58.58	q
11	1	Steve Crabb	Great Britain	7:59.27	
12	2	Juan Carlos Paul	Spain	8:02.57	
13	1	Peter Van de Kerkhove	Belgium	8:04.12	
14	2	Federico Gallego	Spain	8:06.38	
15	2	Enda Fitzpatrick	Ireland	8:26.29	
	1	Nazzareno D'Agostino	Italy	DQ	
	2	Béla Vágó	Hungary	DQ	
	2	Cândido Maia	Portugal	DQ	

=== Final ===
Rank	Name	Nationality	Time	Notes
1st place, gold medalist(s)	Éric Dubus	France	7:53.94	
2nd place, silver medalist(s)	Jacky Carlier	France	7:54.75	
3rd place, bronze medalist(s)	Branko Zorko	Yugoslavia	7:54.77	
4	Mikhail Dasko	Soviet Union	7:55.22	
5	Mário Silva	Portugal	7:56.34	
6	Uwe Pflügner	East Germany	7:57.90	
7	Ian Hamer	Great Britain	7:58.15	
8	Nick O'Brien	Ireland	7:58.76	
9	Zoltán Káldy	Hungary	8:02.33	
10	Adelino Hidalgo	Spain	8:02.71	
