= 1982 IAAF World Cross Country Championships – Junior men's race =

Junior men's race at the 1982 IAAF World Cross Country Championships
- Organisers: IAAF
- Edition: 10th
- Date: March 21
- Host city: Rome, Italy
- Venue: Ippodromo delle Capannelle
- Events: 1
- Distances: 7.926 km – Junior men
- Participation: 93 athletes from 17 nations

The Junior men's race at the 1982 IAAF World Cross Country Championships was held in Rome, Italy, at the Ippodromo delle Capannelle on March 21, 1982. A report on the event was given in the Glasgow Herald.

Complete results, medallists, and the results of British athletes were published.

== Race results ==
=== Junior men's race (7.926 km) ===
==== Individual ====
Rank	Athlete	Country	Time
1st place, gold medalist(s)	Zurbachev Gelaw	Ethiopia	22:45.3
2nd place, silver medalist(s)	Adugna Lema	Ethiopia	22:46.6
3rd place, bronze medalist(s)	Stefano Mei	Italy	22:48.7
4	Hunde Kume	Ethiopia	22:50.5
5	Teka Mekonnen	Ethiopia	22:56.2
6	Francesco Panetta	Italy	23:08.4
7	Salvatore Nicosia	Italy	23:09.2
8	Jonathan Richards	England	23:11.4
9	Gonfa Negere	Ethiopia	23:14.3
10	Bekele Debele	Ethiopia	23:19.7
11	John Easker	United States	23:25
12	Francisco Espejo	Spain	23:29.7
13	Mike Chorlton	England	23:33.6
14	Tom Ansberry	United States	23:36.4
15	Alexandr Chepasov	Soviet Union	23:37.8
16	Martín Fiz	Spain	23:38.6
17	Chris Brewster	Canada	23:41.5
18	Pere Arco	Spain	23:46
19	Marc Olesen	Canada	23:50.2
20	Oleg Strizhakov	Soviet Union	23:53.9
21	Ranieri Carenza	Italy	23:55
22	George Nicholas	United States	23:59.2
23	Joe Stinzi	United States	24:01.8
24	Larbi El Mouadden	Morocco	24:02.9
25	Aissa Remel	Algeria	24:03.7
26	Juan Toledano	Spain	24:06.6
27	Abdellah Boubia	Morocco	24:07.1
28	Dave Reid	Canada	24:07.5
29	Robert Cameron	Scotland	24:08.5
30	Mohamed M'hamdi	Morocco	24:09
31	Paul McCloy	Canada	24:10.3
32	Cripiano Lucas	Portugal	24:11.7
33	Adelino Hidalgo	Spain	24:12.7
34	José Manuel Albentosa	Spain	24:13
35	José Correira	Portugal	24:13.4
36	Paul O'Callaghan	Ireland	24:14
37	Andrew Evans	Wales	24:15.7
38	Paul Fowler	England	24:17.2
39	Sergio Bruni	Italy	24:17.6
40	Igor Lotoryev	Soviet Union	24:18.9
41	Martin Green	England	24:20
42	Kenneth Andreasen	Denmark	24:20.8
43	Noel Henro	Belgium	24:22.9
44	Gordan Mitchell	Scotland	24:24.6
45	Dominique Bouchard	France	24:25.2
46	Jonathan Knight	United States	24:32.1
47	Alain Boucher	Canada	24:33.2
48	Paul McCaffrey	Northern Ireland	24:36.4
49	Abderrahmane Youbi	Algeria	24:36.6
50	Stuart Paton	Scotland	24:36.8
51	Rik Maertens	Belgium	24:37.7
52	Lloyd Tredell	England	24:39.6
53	Nourredine Benzaoui	Algeria	24:41.4
54	Olivier Lefeuvre	France	24:42.1
55	Benny van Wambeke	Belgium	24:43.4
56	Mike Kubitschek	United States	24:44.3
57	Hassan Sebtaoui	Morocco	24:45.5
58	Marco Gozzano	Italy	24:46.6
59	Domingos Castro	Portugal	24:48.6
60	Khaled Aouita	Morocco	24:50.6
61	Ian Steel	Scotland	24:52.4
62	Rachid Kram	Algeria	24:53.9
63	Philippe Auvray	France	24:54.7
64	Bart de Keyser	Belgium	24:54.9
65	Luis Miguel	Portugal	24:56.4
66	Mustapha El Nechchadi	Morocco	25:00.7
67	Gary Couch	England	25:02.3
68	Nicholas Boughey	Wales	25:04.9
69	Michael Dwyer	Ireland	25:06.4
70	Jean-Jacques Vacher	France	25:07.5
71	Nikolay Chernous	Soviet Union	25:10
72	Cormac O'Riordan	Ireland	25:13.6
73	Andy Ronan	Ireland	25:14
74	Peter McColgan	Northern Ireland	25:15.7
75	Gordan Lang	Northern Ireland	25:16.8
76	Russell McKay	Scotland	25:19.8
77	Andrew Rodgers	Wales	25:26.3
78	Chris Reynders	Belgium	25:28.4
79	Carey Nelson	Canada	25:31.1
80	Geoffrey Hill	Wales	25:35.5
81	David McShane	Scotland	25:37.5
82	Hocine Ameur	France	25:40.5
83	Roberto Natale	France	25:46.1
84	H'Mida Nouail	Algeria	25:47.8
85	Dermot Bradshaw	Ireland	25:54.8
86	Johan van Delanotte	Belgium	25:59
87	José Macedo	Portugal	26:00.1
88	Thomas Sørensen	Denmark	26:03.8
89	David Thomas	Wales	26:09.4
90	Jerry Goodman	Northern Ireland	26:14.5
91	Lars Ågaard	Denmark	26:28.6
92	José Regalo	Portugal	28:53.7
—	Ole Hansen	Denmark	DNF

==== Teams ====
Rank	Team	Points
1st place, gold medalist(s)	Ethiopia: Zurbachev Gelaw / 1; Adugna Lema / 2; Hunde Kume / 4; Teka Mekonnen / 5; (Gonfa Negere) / (9); (Bekele Debele) / (10)	12
2nd place, silver medalist(s)	Italy: Stefano Mei / 3; Francesco Panetta / 6; Salvatore Nicosia / 7; Ranieri Carenza / 21; (Sergio Bruni) / (39); (Marco Gozzano) / (58)	37
3rd place, bronze medalist(s)	United States: John Easker / 11; Tom Ansberry / 14; George Nicholas / 22; Joe Stinzi / 23; (Jonathan Knight) / (46); (Mike Kubitschek) / (56)	70
4	Spain: Francisco Espejo / 12; Martín Fiz / 16; Pere Arco / 18; Juan Toledano / 26; (Adelino Hidalgo) / (33); (José Manuel Albentosa) / (34)	72
5	Canada: Chris Brewster / 17; Marc Olesen / 19; Dave Reid / 28; Paul McCloy / 31; (Alain Boucher) / (47); (Carey Nelson) / (79)	95
6	England: Jonathan Richards / 8; Mike Chorlton / 13; Paul Fowler / 38; Martin Green / 41; (Lloyd Tredell) / (52); (Gary Couch) / (67)	100
7	Morocco: Larbi El Mouadden / 24; Abdellah Boubia / 27; Mohamed M'hamdi / 30; Hassan Sebtaoui / 57; (Khaled Aouita) / (60); (Mustapha El Nechchadi) / (66)	138
8	Soviet Union: Alexandr Chepasov / 15; Oleg Strizhakov / 20; Igor Lotoryev / 40; Nikolay Chernous / 71	146
9	Scotland: Robert Cameron / 29; Gordan Mitchell / 44; Stuart Paton / 50; Ian Steel / 61; (Russell McKay) / (76); (David McShane) / (81)	184
10	Algeria: Aissa Remel / 25; Abderrahmane Youbi / 49; Nourredine Benzaoui / 53; Rachid Kram / 62; (H'Mida Nouail) / (84)	189
11	Portugal: Cripiano Lucas / 32; José Correira / 35; Domingos Castro / 59; Luis Miguel / 65; (José Macedo) / (87); (José Regalo) / (92)	191
12	Belgium: Noel Henro / 43; Rik Maertens / 51; Benny van Wambeke / 55; Bart de Keyser / 64; (Chris Reynders) / (78); (Johan van Delanotte) / (86)	213
13	France: Dominique Bouchard / 45; Olivier Lefeuvre / 54; Philippe Auvray / 63; Jean-Jacques Vacher / 70; (Hocine Ameur) / (82); (Roberto Natale) / (83)	232
14	Ireland: Paul O'Callaghan / 36; Michael Dwyer / 69; Cormac O'Riordan / 72; Andy Ronan / 73; (Dermot Bradshaw) / (85)	250
15	Wales: Andrew Evans / 37; Nicholas Boughey / 68; Andrew Rodgers / 77; Geoffrey Hill / 80; (David Thomas) / (89)	262
16	Northern Ireland: Paul McCaffrey / 48; Peter McColgan / 74; Gordan Lang / 75; Jerry Goodman / 90	287
DNF	Denmark: (Kenneth Andreasen) / (42); (Thomas Sørensen) / (88); (Lars Ågaard) / (91); (Ole Hansen) / (DNF)	DNF

- Note: Athletes in parentheses did not score for the team result

== Participation ==
An unofficial count yields the participation of 93 athletes from 17 countries in the Junior men's race. This is in agreement with the official numbers as published.

- Algeria (5)
- Belgium (6)
- Canada (6)
- Denmark (4)
- England (6)
- Ethiopia (6)
- France (6)
- Ireland (5)
- Italy (6)
- Morocco (6)
- Northern Ireland (4)
- Portugal (6)
- Scotland (6)
- Soviet Union (4)
- Spain (6)
- United States (6)
- Wales (5)

== See also ==
- 1982 IAAF World Cross Country Championships – Senior men's race
- 1982 IAAF World Cross Country Championships – Senior women's race
