= Athletics at the 1987 Summer Universiade – Men's 1500 metres =

The men's 1500 metres event at the 1987 Summer Universiade was held at the Stadion Maksimir in Zagreb on 17 and 19 July 1987.

== Medalists ==
Gold	Silver	Bronze
Hauke Fuhlbrügge; East Germany	Rob Harrison; Great Britain	Andrey Ponomaryov; Soviet Union

== Results ==
=== Heats ===
Rank	Heat	Athlete	Nationality	Time	Notes
1	4	Marek Adamski	Poland	3:43.51	Q
2	4	Jeff Atkinson	United States	3:43.99	Q
3	2	Hauke Fuhlbrügge	East Germany	3:44.44	Q
4	4	Manuel Balmaceda	Chile	3:44.60	q
5	2	Eckhardt Rüter	West Germany	3:44.65	Q
6	4	Steffen Brand	West Germany	3:44.68	q
7	4	Fabio Olivo	Italy	3:44.94	q
8	2	Andrey Ponomaryov	Soviet Union	3:45.00	q
9	4	Kai Jenkel	Switzerland	3:45.07	
10	4	Ove Talsnes	Norway	3:45.53	
11	1	Rob Harrison	Great Britain	3:46.34	Q
12	1	Branko Zorko	Yugoslavia	3:46.91	Q
13	1	Yoshikazu Arata	Japan	3:46.96	
14	3	Neil Horsfield	Great Britain	3:47.04	Q
15	2	Jeff Pigg	United States	3:47.05	
16	3	József Bereczki	Hungary	3:47.44	Q
17	3	Colin Dalton	Australia	3:47.65	
18	1	Alex Geißbühler	Switzerland	3:48.18	
19	1	Eduardo Cabrera	Mexico	3:48.19	
20	1	Luca Vandi	Italy	3:48.79	
21	3	Nicos Vassiliou	Cyprus	3:50.67	
22	4	Ryu Tae-kyung	South Korea	3:50.73	
23	3	Zijad Čomaga	Yugoslavia	3:51.35	
24	1	Fu Zhe	China	3:51.79	
25	3	Juan Ramón Conde	Cuba	3:52.16	
26	3	Luis Martínez	Guatemala	3:52.28	
27	2	Igor Kristensen	Norway	3:52.90	
28	1	Eugene Curran	Ireland	3:54.97	
29	4	Pham Van Phuong	Vietnam	3:58.53	
30	1	Ersin Ata	Turkey	3:59.50	
31	3	Syed Meesaq Rizvi	Pakistan	4:00.91	
32	4	Carlos Pereira	Cape Verde	4:01.67	
33	4	Abdullah Youssef	Jordan	4:03.00	
34	1	Jorge Fidel Ponce	Honduras	4:03.47	
35	1	Hugo Sánchez	Costa Rica	4:09.23	
36	2	Omar Ammouri	Jordan	4:09.61	
37	2	Mohamed El Moctar	Mauritania	4:17.96	
38	1	Omer Khalifa	Sudan	4:20.08	
39	2	Manyeil Agar	Sudan	4:39.23	
	4	Gerard Ryan	Australia	DNS	

=== Final ===
Rank	Athlete	Nationality	Time	Notes
1st place, gold medalist(s)	Hauke Fuhlbrügge	East Germany	3:44.87	
2nd place, silver medalist(s)	Rob Harrison	Great Britain	3:45.13	
3rd place, bronze medalist(s)	Andrey Ponomaryov	Soviet Union	3:45.52	
4	Neil Horsfield	Great Britain	3:45.74	
5	Marek Adamski	Poland	3:45.94	
6	Eckhardt Rüter	West Germany	3:46.36	
7	Branko Zorko	Yugoslavia	3:46.46	
8	Jeff Atkinson	United States	3:46.73	
9	Steffen Brand	West Germany	3:47.53	
10	Fabio Olivo	Italy	3:48.07	
11	József Bereczki	Hungary	3:48.89	
12	Manuel Balmaceda	Chile	3:52.73	
