= José Luis González (runner) =

Spanish middle-distance runner

Personal information
- Nationality: Spanish
- Born: 8 December 1957 (age 68) Villaluenga de la Sagra
- Height: 180 cm (5 ft 11 in)
- Weight: 63 kg (139 lb)

Sport
- Country: Spain
- Sport: Athletics
- Event(s): 1500 metres, mile run

Achievements and titles
- Personal bests: 1500 m – 3:30.92 (1985); Mile run – 3:47.79 (1985) NR
Medal record
Men's athletics
Representing Spain
World Athletics Championships
Silver medal – second place	1987 Rome	1500 m
World Indoor Championships
Silver medal – second place	1985 Paris	1500 m
Silver medal – second place	1989 Budapest	3000 m
European Indoor Championships
Gold medal – first place	1982 Milan	1500 m

José Luis González Sánchez (born 8 December 1957 in Villaluenga de la Sagra, Toledo) is a Spanish former middle-distance runner. He represented Spain at the Olympics on three occasions (1980, 1984, 1992) with his best performance being a semi-final run in the 1500 m in 1980.

Gonzalez won a 1500 m silver medal at the 1987 World Championships in Athletics behind Abdi Bile, and also won IAAF World Indoor Championships silver medals in 1985 and 1989. He appeared six times at the IAAF World Cross Country Championships, starting with a junior silver medal in 1975. He competed at the European Athletics Championships in 1986 and 1990, and was a six-time champion at the European Athletics Indoor Championships. Among his other international honours are a silver medal at the 1983 Mediterranean Games, and wins at the 1987 European Cup and 1983 Ibero-American Championships in Athletics. He was a seven-time Spanish national champion, winning four 1500 m titles and a 5000 m crown at the Spanish Athletics Championships, plus two victories at the Spanish Cross Country Championships.

He was one of the world's fastest 1500 metres runners of the 1980s – in a race in Nice in 1985, Gonzalez came third behind Steve Cram and Saïd Aouita, who became the first man to run the distance below 3:30 minutes. Gonzalez set a Spanish record of 3:30.92 minutes and a few weeks later also ran a national record in the mile run with 3:47.79 minutes. He was chosen at the Spanish sportsman of the year in 1986.

He received the silver medal of the Royal Order of Sports Merit in 1994 from the Consejo Superior de Deportes.

== Statistics ==
=== Personal bests ===
- 800 metres – 1:47.14 (1984)
- 1500 metres – 3:30.92 (1985)
- Mile run – 3:47.79 (1985) NR
- 2000 metres – 5:02.25 (1985)
- 3000 metres – 7:42.93 (1987)
- 5000 metres – 13:12.34 (1987)

=== International competitions ===
Year	Competition	Venue	Position	Event	Notes
1974	Gymnasiade	Florence, Italy	1st	3000 m	8:23.4
1975	European Junior Championships	Athens, Greece	3rd	3000 m	8:17.0
1975	World Cross Country Championships	Rabat, Morocco	2nd	Junior	21:18
1975	World Cross Country Championships	Rabat, Morocco	3rd	Junior team	44 pts
1976	World Cross Country Championships	Chepstow, United Kingdom	12th	Junior	24:49
1976	World Cross Country Championships	Chepstow, United Kingdom	2nd	Junior team	60 pts
1978	World Cross Country Championships	Glasgow, United Kingdom	58th	Senior	41:46
1978	World Cross Country Championships	Glasgow, United Kingdom	10th	Team	324 pts
1979	World Cross Country Championships	Limerick, Ireland	15th	Senior	38:08
1979	World Cross Country Championships	Limerick, Ireland	9th	Team	407 pts
1980	World Cross Country Championships	Paris, France	22nd	Senior	37:51
1980	World Cross Country Championships	Paris, France	6th	Team	251 pts
1980	Olympic Games	Moscow, Russia	8th (semis)	1500 m	3:42.55
1981	World Cross Country Championships	Madrid, Spain	27th	Senior	35:50
1981	World Cross Country Championships	Madrid, Spain	4th	Team	254 pts
1982	European Indoor Championships	Milan, Italy	1st	1500 m	3:38.70
1983	World Championships	Helsinki, Finland	6th (semis)	1500 m	3:38.77
1983	Mediterranean Games	Barcelona, Spain	2nd	1500 m	3:39.59
1983	Ibero-American Championships	Barcelona, Spain	1st	800 m	1:49.11
1984	Olympic Games	Los Angeles, United States	5th (heats)	1500 m	3:47.01
1985	World Cross Country Championships	Lisbon, Portugal	123rd	Senior	35:30
1985	World Cross Country Championships	Lisbon, Portugal	5th	Team	321 pts
1985	European Indoor Championships	Athens, Greece	1st	1500 m	3:39.26
1985	World Indoor Games	Paris, France	2nd	1500 m	3:41.36
1985	European Cup (1st division)	Budapest, Hungary	1st	1500 m	3:45.33
1986	European Indoor Championships	Madrid, Spain	1st	1500 m	3:44.55
1986	European Championships	Stuttgart	4th	1500 m	3:42.54
1986	Grand Prix Final	Berlin, Germany	2nd	Mile	42 pts
1987	European Indoor Championships	Liévin, France	1st	3000 m	7:52.28
1987	World Championship	Rome, Italy	2nd	1500 m	3:38.03
1987	European Cup	Prague, Czechoslovakia	2nd	1500 m	3:45.49
1988	European Indoor Championships	Budapest, Hungary	1st	3000 m	7:55.29
1988	Grand Prix Final	Berlin, Germany	3rd	Mile	3:56.67
1989	World Indoor Championships	Budapest, Hungary	2nd	3000 m	7:48.66
1990	European Championships	Split, Croatia	6th	1500 m	3:39.15
1991	World Indoor Championships	Seville, Spain	7th	3000 m	7:48.44
1991	World Championship	Tokyo, Japan	8th (semis)	1500 m	3:41.71
1992	European Indoor Championships	Genoa, Italy	3rd	3000 m	7:48.82
1992	Olympic Games	Barcelona, Spain	7th (heats)	1500 m	3:46.75

=== National titles ===
- Spanish Cross Country Championships: 1980, 1981
- Spanish Athletics Championships
  - 1500 m: 1976, 1979, 1980, 1986
  - 5000 m: 1990

=== Circuit wins ===
1500 m

- Meeting de Paris: 1983
- Helsinki Grand Prix: 1985, 1986
- Fifth Avenue Mile: 1986
- Míting Internacional d´Atletisme Ciutat de Barcelona: 1987
- London Grand Prix: 1987

Mile

- ISTAF Berlin: 1987

3000 m

- DN-Galan: 1987

== See also ==
- List of middle-distance runners
- List of Spanish sportspeople
- List of World Athletics Championships medalists (men)
- List of IAAF World Indoor Championships medalists (men)
- List of European Athletics Indoor Championships medalists (men)
- List of 5000 metres national champions (men)
- 1500 metres at the World Championships in Athletics
- Spain at the World Athletics Championships
