= José Luis Carreira =

Spanish middle-distance runner

Personal information
- Born: 30 March 1962 (age 63) Madrid, Spain

Sport
- Sport: Athletics
- Event(s): 1500 m, 3000 m

José Luis Carreira (born 30 March 1962) is a retired Spanish middle-distance runner who competed primarily in the 1500 metres. He won medals at the 1985 and 1986 European Indoor Championships. In addition, he finished sixth at the 1989 World Indoor Championships and ninth at the 1986 European Championships.

== International competitions ==
Year	Competition	Venue	Position	Event	Notes
Representing Spain
1981	European Junior Championships	Utrecht, Netherlands	14th (sf)	800 m	1:53.51
1985	European Indoor Championships	Piraeus, Greece	3rd	1500 m	3:40.43
1986	European Indoor Championships	Madrid, Spain	2nd	1500 m	3:45.07
1986	Ibero-American Championships	Havana, Cuba	1st	1500 m	3:44.93
1986	European Championships	Stuttgart, West Germany	9th	1500 m	3:44.09
1989	World Indoor Championships	Budapest, Hungary	7th	3000 m	7:53.22
1989	World Cup	Barcelona, Spain	3rd	5000 m	13:25.94

== Personal bests ==
Outdoor

- 800 metres – 1:52.06 (Utrecht 1981)
- 1500 metres – 3:35.56 (A Coruña 1986)
- One mile – 3:55.94 (Madrid 1987)
- 2000 metres – 4:57.53 (Santander 1986)
- 3000 metres – 7:44.04 (Seville 1987)
- 5000 metres – 13:25.94 (Barcelona 1989)

Indoor

- 1500 metres – 3:38.77 (Oviedo 1986)
- 3000 metres – 7:51.98 (Budapest 1989)
