= 1983 European Athletics Indoor Championships – Men's 800 metres =

The men's 800 metres event at the 1983 European Athletics Indoor Championships was held on 5 and 6 March.

== Medalists ==
Gold	Silver	Bronze
Colomán Trabado; Spain	Peter Elliott; Great Britain	Thierry Tonnelier; France

== Results ==
=== Heats ===
First 3 from each heat (Q) and the next 1 fastest (q) qualified for the semifinals.

Rank	Heat	Name	Nationality	Time	Notes
1	1	Viktor Zemlyanskiy	Soviet Union	1:49.26	Q
2	1	Rob Druppers	Netherlands	1:49.28	Q
3	1	Andres Garcia	France	1:49.45	Q
4	1	Hans Lang	West Germany	1:49.52	q
5	2	Thierry Tonnelier	France	1:49.82	Q
6	3	Peter Elliott	Great Britain	1:50.06	Q
7	1	András Paróczai	Hungary	1:50.07	q
8	3	Andrés Vera	Spain	1:50.09	Q
9	3	Didier Le Guillou	France	1:50.16	Q
10	2	Colomán Trabado	Spain	1:50.20	Q
11	3	Petru Drăgoescu	Romania	1:50.07	q
12	2	Binko Kolev	Bulgaria	1:50.40	Q
13	3	Zsolt Szabó	Hungary	1:50.62	
14	2	Reinhold Studer	Switzerland	1:51.18	

=== Semifinals ===
First 2 from each semifinal (Q) and next 2 fastest (q) qualified for the final.

Rank	Heat	Name	Nationality	Time	Notes
1	2	Colomán Trabado	Spain	1:48.39	Q
2	2	Peter Elliott	Great Britain	1:48.79	Q
3	2	Petru Drăgoescu	Romania	1:48.94	q
4	2	Andres Garcia	France	1:49.62	q
5	1	Thierry Tonnelier	France	1:50.08	Q
6	1	Binko Kolev	Bulgaria	1:50.26	Q
7	1	Andrés Vera	Spain	1:50.42	
8	1	Hans Lang	West Germany	1:50.64	
9	1	Didier Le Guillou	France	1:50.69	
10	1	Viktor Zemlyanskiy	Soviet Union	1:54.44	
	2	Rob Druppers	Netherlands	DNF	
	2	András Paróczai	Hungary	DNS	

=== Final ===
Rank	Name	Nationality	Time	Notes
1st place, gold medalist(s)	Colomán Trabado	Spain	1:46.91	
2nd place, silver medalist(s)	Peter Elliott	Great Britain	1:47.58	
3rd place, bronze medalist(s)	Thierry Tonnelier	France	1:47.68	
4	Petru Drăgoescu	Romania	1:47.91	
5	Binko Kolev	Bulgaria	1:51.94	
6	Andres Garcia	France	2:04.91	
