= 1989 European Athletics Indoor Championships – Men's 1500 metres =

The men's 1500 metres event at the 1989 European Athletics Indoor Championships was held on 18 and 19 February.

== Medalists ==
Gold	Silver	Bronze
Hervé Phélippeau; France	Han Kulker; Netherlands	Sergey Afanasyev; Soviet Union

== Results ==
=== Heats ===
First 3 from each heat (Q) and the next 2 fastest (q) qualified for the final.

Rank	Heat	Name	Nationality	Time	Notes
1	1	Sergey Afanasyev	Soviet Union	3:44.31	Q
2	1	Tonino Viali	Italy	3:44.57	Q
3	1	Manuel Pancorbo	Spain	3:44.79	Q
4	1	Eckhardt Rüter	West Germany	3:44.79	q
5	1	Hauke Fuhlbrügge	East Germany	3:44.88	q
6	1	Klaus-Peter Nabein	West Germany	3:44.91	
7	2	Han Kulker	Netherlands	3:45.46	Q
8	2	Espen Borge	Norway	3:45.69	Q
9	2	Hervé Phélippeau	France	3:46.14	Q
10	2	Karl Blaha	Austria	3:46.15	
11	2	Mario Neumann	East Germany	3:46.24	
12	1	Marc Corstjens	Belgium	3:47.13	
13	1	Petr Nechanický	Czechoslovakia	3:47.35	
14	2	Ángel Fariñas	Spain	3:47.92	
15	2	Mark Kirk	Great Britain	3:48.12	
16	2	Ralf Stewing	West Germany	3:49.09	
17	2	Nikolaos Vouzis	Greece	3:49.76	
18	1	Róbert Banai	Hungary	3:50.14	

=== Final ===
Rank	Name	Nationality	Time	Notes
1st place, gold medalist(s)	Hervé Phélippeau	France	3:47.42	
2nd place, silver medalist(s)	Han Kulker	Netherlands	3:47.57	
3rd place, bronze medalist(s)	Sergey Afanasyev	Soviet Union	3:47.63	
4	Manuel Pancorbo	Spain	3:47.64	
5	Hauke Fuhlbrügge	East Germany	3:47.76	
6	Eckhardt Rüter	West Germany	3:48.95	
7	Espen Borge	Norway	3:49.57	
8	Tonino Viali	Italy	3:51.01	
