= 1989 European Athletics Indoor Championships – Men's 3000 metres =

The men's 3000 metres event at the 1989 European Athletics Indoor Championships was held on 18 and 19 February.

== Medalists ==
Gold	Silver	Bronze
Dieter Baumann; West Germany	Abel Antón; Spain	Jacky Carlier; France

== Results ==
=== Heats ===
First 4 from each heat (Q) and the next 4 fastest (q) qualified for the final.

Rank	Heat	Name	Nationality	Time	Notes
1	1	Jacky Carlier	France	8:02.98	Q
2	1	Branko Zorko	Yugoslavia	8:03.36	Q
3	1	Dieter Baumann	West Germany	8:03.44	Q
4	2	Rémy Geoffroy	France	8:03.49	Q
5	2	Mário Silva	Portugal	8:03.62	Q
6	2	Anacleto Jiménez	Spain	8:03.67	Q
7	2	Abel Antón	Spain	8:03.73	Q
8	2	Peter Wirz	Switzerland	8:03.73	q
9	1	João Campos	Portugal	8:04.09	Q
10	1	Adelino Hidalgo	Spain	8:04.50	q
11	2	Frank Bialluch	West Germany	8:04.72	q
12	1	Herman Hofstee	Netherlands	8:06.03	q
13	2	Alistair Currie	Great Britain	8:07.34	
14	1	Markus Neukirch	West Germany	8:07.42	
15	1	Liam O'Brien	Ireland	8:11.21	
16	1	Colin Walker	Great Britain	8:17.02	
17	2	Enda Fitzpatrick	Ireland	8:17.41	
18	1	Peter Van de Kerkhove	Belgium	8:19.75	
19	1	Paul Larkins	Great Britain	8:21.35	
	2	Béla Vágó	Hungary	DNF	

=== Final ===
Rank	Name	Nationality	Time	Notes
1st place, gold medalist(s)	Dieter Baumann	West Germany	7:50.43	
2nd place, silver medalist(s)	Abel Antón	Spain	7:51.88	
3rd place, bronze medalist(s)	Jacky Carlier	France	7:52.23	
4	Rémy Geoffroy	France	7:52.90	
5	Branko Zorko	Yugoslavia	7:54.16	
6	João Campos	Portugal	7:54.93	
7	Adelino Hidalgo	Spain	7:55.17	PB
8	Mário Silva	Portugal	7:55.89	
9	Anacleto Jiménez	Spain	7:58.16	
10	Herman Hofstee	Netherlands	8:00.13	
11	Frank Bialluch	West Germany	8:00.33	
	Peter Wirz	Switzerland	DNF	
