= Ansberry =

Ansberry is a surname. Notable people with the surname include:

- Timothy T. Ansberry (1871–1943), American politician
- Tom Ansberry (born 1963), American long-distance runner
