= 1986 European Athletics Championships – Men's 1500 metres =

1986 European Athletics Championships - Men's 1500 metres fierce race 29 and 31 August

Men's 1500 metres at the European Athletics Championships

These are the official results of the Men's 1,500 metres event at the 1986 European Championships in Stuttgart, West Germany, held at Neckarstadion on 29 and 31 August 1986.

== Medalists ==
Gold	Steve Cram; United Kingdom
Silver	Sebastian Coe; United Kingdom
Bronze	Han Kulker; Netherlands

== Final ==
Rank	Final	Time
	Steve Cram (GBR)	3:41.09
	Sebastian Coe (GBR)	3:41.67
	Han Kulker (NED)	3:42.11
4.	José Luis González (ESP)	3:42.54
5.	John Gladwin (GBR)	3:42.57
6.	Marcus O'Sullivan (IRL)	3:42.60
7.	Johnny Kroon (SWE)	3:42.61
8.	Frank O'Mara (IRL)	3:42.90
9.	José Luis Carreira (ESP)	3:44.09
10.	Peter Wirz (SUI)	3:44.09
11.	Igor Lotaryov (URS)	3:44.80
12.	Niels Kim Hjorth (DEN)	3:45.06

== Qualifying heats ==
Rank	Heat 1	Time
1.	Marcus O'Sullivan (IRL)	3:39.02
2.	Sebastian Coe (GBR)	3:39.03
3.	Han Kulker (NED)	3:39.08
4.	José Manuel Abascal (ESP)	3:39.20
5.	Klaus-Peter Nabein (FRG)	3:40.44
6.	Pascal Thiébaut (FRA)	3:40.81
7.	Mário Silva (POR)	3:42.04
8.	Markus Hacksteiner (SUI)	3:44.81
9.	Ronny Olsson (SWE)	3:50.17
10.	Zeki Öztürk (TUR)	3:51.72

Rank	Heat 2	Time
1.	Steve Cram (GBR)	3:40.66
2.	Johnny Kroon (SWE)	3:41.22
3.	José Luis Carreira (ESP)	3:41.33
4.	Cyrille Laventure (FRA)	3:41.41
5.	Andreas Busse (GDR)	3:42.06
6.	Eddy Stevens (BEL)	3:42.21
7.	Mogens Guldberg (DEN)	3:42.84
8.	Dave Taylor (IRL)	3:44.57
9.	Ari Suhonen (FIN)	3:49.60
—	Sergey Afanasyev (URS)	DSQ

Rank	Heat 3	Time
1.	John Gladwin (GBR)	3:36.85
2.	José Luis González (ESP)	3:36.92
3.	Frank O'Mara (IRL)	3:37.06
4.	Igor Lotaryov (URS)	3:37.53
5.	Niels Kim Hjorth (DEN)	3:37.60
6.	Peter Wirz (SUI)	3:37.75
7.	Bruno Levant (FRA)	3:40.82
8.	Rainer Thau (FRG)	3:41.10
9.	Östen Buskas (SWE)	3:42.88

== Participation ==
According to an unofficial count, 29 athletes from 15 countries participated in the event.

- Belgium (1)
- Denmark (2)
- East Germany (1)
- Finland (1)
- France (3)
- Ireland (3)
- Netherlands (1)
- Portugal (1)
- Soviet Union (2)
- Spain (3)
- Sweden (3)
- Switzerland (2)
- Turkey (1)
- United Kingdom (3)
- West Germany (2)

== See also ==
- 1982 Men's European Championships 1,500 metres (Athens)
- 1983 Men's World Championships 1,500 metres (Helsinki)
- 1984 Men's Olympic 1,500 metres (Los Angeles)
- 1987 Men's World Championships 1,500 metres (Rome)
- 1988 Men's Olympic 1,500 metres (Seoul)
- 1990 Men's European Championships 1,500 metres (Split)
