= Ikem Billy =

British middle-distance runner

Personal information
- Nationality: British (English)
- Born: 25 January 1964 (age 62) Birkenhead, Cheshire, England

Sport
- Sport: Athletics
- Event: Middle-distance
- Club: Loughborough; Wirral AC
Medal record
Athletics
Representing Great Britain
IAAF World Indoor Games
Bronze medal – third place	1985 Paris	800 m
Summer Universiade
Silver medal – second place	1989 Duisburg	800 m

Ikem G Billy (born 25 January 1964) is a British former middle-distance runner who specialised in the 800 metres. He was the bronze medallist at the 1985 IAAF World Indoor Games and a silver medallist at the 1989 Summer Universiade. He was a two-time national champion, with one win outdoors and one indoors. He represented his country at the IAAF World Indoor Championships on two occasions and England at the 1990 Commonwealth Games.

== Biography ==
Billy grew in the Wirral and took up running at an early age, first representing England at the age of thirteen. His first success came at the 1983 European Athletics Junior Championships, where he won the 800 m gold medal. He was the English schools champion and AAA Indoor Junior champion over 800 m that same year.

His major senior debut followed at the 1984 European Athletics Indoor Championships, where he narrowly missed a medal in fourth place behind fellow Briton Phil Norgate. He achieved his personal best of 1:44.65 minutes that year, but was overlooked for the British Olympic team for the 1984 Los Angeles Games. His first national title followed at the 1985 AAA Indoor Championships and his form continued to the 1985 IAAF World Indoor Games, taking a bronze medal at the inaugural event. He injured himself in 1986, which disrupted his career for a two and half years.

He made his return to senior athletics with sixth place finishes at the 1988 European Athletics Indoor Championships and the 1989 IAAF World Indoor Championships. He took his first and only career title at the AAA Championships in 1989, and was also the British Universities champion over 400 metres. He represented Great Britain at the Universiade and claimed the silver medal behind Finland's Ari Suhonen.

Billy defeated Coe at the 1990 Commonwealth Games, but was still out of the medals in fifth place. The last major outing of Billy's career was the 1991 IAAF World Indoor Championships but he was far from his best form, being eliminated in the heats with a time of 1:49.09 minutes.

== International competitions ==
Year	Competition	Venue	Position	Event	Notes
1983	European Junior Championships	Schwechat, Austria	1st	800 m	1:47.15
1984	European Indoor Championships	Gothenburg, Sweden	4th	800 m	1:48.41
1985	World Indoor Games	Paris, France	3rd	800 m	1:48.28
1988	European Indoor Championships	Budapest, Hungary	6th	800 m	1:50.36
1989	World Indoor Championships	Budapest, Hungary	6th	800 m	1:48.97
1989	Universiade	Duisburg, Germany	2nd	800 m	1:47.29
1990	Commonwealth Games	Auckland, New Zealand	5th	800 m	1:47.16
1991	World Indoor Championships	Seville, Spain	10th (h)	800 m	1:49.09

== National titles ==
- AAA Championships
  - 800 m: 1989
- AAA Indoor Championships
  - 800 m: 1985
- British Universities Athletics Championships
  - 400 m: 1989
- English Schools' Athletics Championships
  - 800 m: 1983
- AAA Junior Indoor Championships
  - 800 m: 1983
