= Peter Wirz =

Swiss middle-distance runner

Personal information
- Born: 29 July 1960 (age 65)
- Height: 1.81 m (5 ft 11 in)
- Weight: 68 kg (150 lb)

Sport
- Sport: Athletics
- Events: 1500 m, 3000 m
- Club: STB Bern; LC Zürich

Peter Wirz (born 29 July 1960) is a retired Swiss middle-distance runner who competed primarily in the 1500 metres. He represented his country at the 1984 and 1988 Summer Olympics, as well as two outdoor and one indoor World Championships. In addition, he won a gold medal at the 1984 European Indoor Championships.

== International competitions ==
Year	Competition	Venue	Position	Event	Notes
Representing Switzerland
1979	European Junior Championships	Bydgoszcz, Poland	3rd	1500 m	3:42.66
1983	European Indoor Championships	Budapest, Hungary	4th	1500 m	3:41.95
1983	World Championships	Helsinki, Finland	23rd (h)	1500 m	3:41.69
1984	European Indoor Championships	Gothenburg, Sweden	1st	1500 m	3:41.35
1984	Olympic Games	Los Angeles, United States	6th	1500 m	3:36.97
1986	European Indoor Championships	Madrid, Spain	5th	1500 m	3:48.06
1986	European Championships	Stuttgart, West Germany	10th	1500 m	3:44.09
1987	World Championships	Rome, Italy	28th (h)	1500 m	3:43.00
1988	Olympic Games	Seoul, South Korea	13th (h)	1500 m	3:41.26^{1}
1989	European Indoor Championships	The Hague, Netherlands	8th (h)	3000 m	8:03.73^{2}
1989	World Indoor Championships	Budapest, Hungary	14th (h)	3000 m	7:53.70

^{1}Did not finish in the semifinals
^{2}Did not finish in the final

== Personal bests ==
Outdoor

- 800 metres – 1:47.98 (Bern 1984)
- 1000 metres – 2:18.37 (Bern 1983)
- 1500 metres – 3:35.83 (Los Angeles 1984)
- One mile – 3:55.68 (London 1986)
- 2000 metres – 4:58.29 (Langenthal 1984)
- 3000 metres – 7:44.89 (Seville 1987)
- 5000 metres – 13:38.23 (Sittard 1989)

Indoor

- 1500 metres – 3:40.20 (Stuttgart 1985)
- 2000 metres – 5:06.28 (Sindelfingen 1984)
- 3000 metres – 7:51.42 (Stuttgart 1989)

== Bibliography ==
- All-Athletics profile
