= Steve Holman (athlete) =

American middle-distance runner (born 1970)

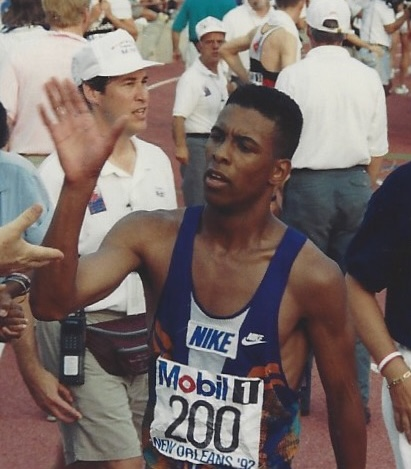

Personal information
- Born: March 2, 1970 (age 56) Indianapolis, Indiana, United States
- Education: Georgetown University
- Height: 1.86 m (6 ft 1 in)
- Weight: 66 kg (146 lb)

Sport
- Sport: Athletics
- Event: 1500 m
- College team: Georgetown Hoyas
- Coached by: Frank Gagliano

Steven Clifton Orlando Holman (born March 2, 1970, in Indianapolis) is a retired American middle-distance runner who competed primarily in the 1500 meters. He represented his country at the 1992 Summer Olympics as well as two indoor and two outdoor World Championships. Holman was coached at Georgetown University and in his professional career by Frank Gagliano.

== Early life ==
Steve Holman grew up in Richfield, Minnesota, where he attended Richfield High School. Too small for football and soccer, Holman joined the track team instead. He initially ran the 3200 meter run before discovering his middle-distance talent.

In 1988, he won Minnesota state high school titles as a senior in the 800 meter run (1:50.5) and 1600 meter run (4:08.26). His 800-meter mark stood as a state record until 1996.

== Collegiate running ==
Holman attended Georgetown University where he ran for Coach Frank Gagliano. He turned in his strongest performances as Senior, claiming the 1992 NCAA Division I Outdoor Track and Field Championships – Men's 1,500 meter run title in 3:38.39. Demonstrating his range as a middle-distance runner, Holman was also 4th in the 1992 Indoor NCAA 5000 meter championship running 13:47.63. By the end of 1992, Track & Field News ranked him #2 in the nation with a 1500m time of 3:34.95 and mile time of 3:52.73. Holman was a 10-time All-American while at Georgetown.

== Competition record ==
Year	Competition	Venue	Position	Event	Notes
Representing the United States
1992	Olympic Games	Barcelona, Spain	20th (sf)	1500 m	3:40.49
1993	World Indoor Championships	Toronto, Canada	4th	1500 m	3:45.59
1994	Goodwill Games	St. Petersburg, Russia	3rd	Mile	3:52.77
1997	World Championships	Athens, Greece	15th (sf)	1500 m	3:39.97
1998	Goodwill Games	Uniondale, United States	9th	Mile	4:06.33
1999	World Indoor Championships	Maebashi, Japan	6th	3000 m	7:56.96
1999	World Championships	Seville, Spain	9th	1500 m	3:34.32

== Personal bests ==
Outdoor

- 800 meters – 1:44.98 (Lappeenranta 1995)
- 1000 meters – 2:16.68 (Rieti 1999)
- 1500 meters – 3:31.52 (Brussels 1997)
- One mile – 3:50.40 (Oslo 1997)
- 5000 meters – 13:56.49 (Raleigh 2000)

Indoor

- 800 meters – 1:51.15 (Boston 1998)
- 1000 meters – 2:19.96 (Fairfax 1993)
- 1500 meters – 3:41.96 (Toronto 1993)
- One mile – 3:55.41 (New York 1993)
- 3000 meters – 7:42.49 (Fairfax 1996)
- 5000 meters – 13:47.63 (Indianapolis 1992)

== Retirement from competitive running ==
Steve Holman retired from competitive running in 2001. He attended the Wharton School of the University of Pennsylvania in 2002. Following graduation, he eventually began working for The Vanguard Group.

Holman continued running in retirement. He ran 2:30:47 for a full marathon at the 2003 Twin Cities Marathon. He ran the 1200m leg on Vanguard's 2005 corporate distance medley team that finished second in 10:54:99 at the 2005 Penn Relays. Holman completed the 2007 New York City Marathon full marathon in 2:38:16.

== Finance career ==
Holman has worked at The Vanguard Group since finishing his MBA at the Wharton School of the University of Pennsylvania. In 2012, Holman worked in Vanguard's high net worth client service area. He celebrated 10 years working in Vanguard Small Business Retirement Planning in 2021, helping small businesses provide their employees with retirement plans.

== Recognition ==
On Saturday, January 18, 2014, Steve Holman was inducted into the Georgetown University Athletic Hall of Fame. He is Georgetown University's most decorated Track and Field athlete of all time.
