= Johnny Kroon =

Swedish middle-distance runner

Personal information
- Born: 6 January 1960 (age 65)

Sport
- Sport: Athletics
- Event: 1500 metres
- Club: Heleneholms IF; Malmö AI

Johnny Kroon (born 6 January 1960) is a Swedish former middle-distance runner who specialised in the 1500 metres. He represented his country at the 1987 World Championships. He held the national record in the 1500 metres between 1985 and 2019.

His son, Simon Kroon, is a footballer.

== International competitions ==
Year	Competition	Venue	Position	Event	Notes
Representing Sweden
1979	European Junior Championships	Bydgoszcz, Poland	11th	1500 m	3:53.56
1979	European Junior Championships	Bydgoszcz, Poland	13th	3000 m	8:19.24
1982	European Championships	Athens, Greece	13th (h)	1500 m	3:42.75
1985	European Indoor Championships	Piraeus, Greece	8th	1500 m	3:45.91
1986	European Championships	Stuttgart, West Germany	7th	1500 m	3:42.61
1987	European Indoor Championships	Liévin, France	9th	1500 m	3:54.14
1987	World Championships	Rome, Italy	35th (h)	1500 m	3:49.06

== Personal bests ==
Outdoor

- 800 metres – 1:47.58 (Västerås 1987)
- 1000 metres – 2:19.58 (Oslo 1981)
- 1500 metres – 3:36.49 (Oslo 1985)
- One mile – 3:55.17 (Berlin 1986)
- 3000 metres – 8:19.24 (Bydgoszcz 1979)

Indoor

- 1500 metres – 3:41.26 (Stuttgart 1987)
