= 1987 European Athletics Indoor Championships – Men's 1500 metres =

The men's 1500 metres event at the 1987 European Athletics Indoor Championships was held on 21 and 22 February.

== Medalists ==
Gold	Silver	Bronze
Han Kulker; Netherlands	Jens-Peter Herold; East Germany	Klaus-Peter Nabein; West Germany

== Results ==
=== Heats ===
First 3 from each heat (Q) and the next 3 fastest (q) qualified for the semifinals.

Rank	Heat	Name	Nationality	Time	Notes
1	2	Han Kulker	Netherlands	3:45.86	Q
2	2	Igor Lotaryov	Soviet Union	3:45.86	Q
3	2	Klaus-Peter Nabein	West Germany	3:46.22	Q
4	2	Andrés Vera	Spain	3:46.31	q
5	2	Yvan Perre	France	3:46.47	q
6	2	Luca Vandi	Italy	3:46.51	q
7	2	Slobodan Crnokrak	Yugoslavia	3:47.97	
8	1	Jens-Peter Herold	East Germany	3:49.68	Q
9	1	Johnny Kroon	Sweden	3:49.99	Q
10	1	Hervé Phélippeau	France	3:50.01	Q
11	1	Alessandro Lambruschini	Italy	3:50.04	
12	1	Uwe Mönkemeyer	West Germany	3:50.16	
13	1	Vladimir Slouka	Czechoslovakia	3:50.40	
14	2	António Monteiro	Portugal	3:53.14	
	1	Lars Stene	Norway	DNS	

=== Final ===
Rank	Name	Nationality	Time	Notes
1st place, gold medalist(s)	Han Kulker	Netherlands	3:44.79	
2nd place, silver medalist(s)	Jens-Peter Herold	East Germany	3:45.36	
3rd place, bronze medalist(s)	Klaus-Peter Nabein	West Germany	3:45.84	
4	Igor Lotaryov	Soviet Union	3:46.11	
5	Hervé Phélippeau	France	3:46.16	
6	Andrés Vera	Spain	3:47.89	
7	Luca Vandi	Italy	3:48.31	
8	Yvan Perre	France	3:48.54	
9	Johnny Kroon	Sweden	3:54.14	
