= Branko Zorko =

Croatian retired middle distance runner (born 1967)

Personal information
- Nationality: Croatian
- Born: 1 July 1967 (age 59) Hodošan, SR Croatia, SFR Yugoslavia

Sport
- Sport: Track
- Events: 1500 metres, mile

Achievements and titles
- Personal bests: 1500m: 3:33.30; Mile: 3:52.64; 3000m: 7:48.72; 5000m: 13:43.04
Medal record
Men's athletics
Representing Croatia
World Indoor Championships
Bronze medal – third place	1993 Toronto	1500 m
European Championships
Bronze medal – third place	1994 Helsinki	1500 m
European Indoor Championships
Silver medal – second place	1994 Paris	1500 m
Bronze medal – third place	1990 Glasgow	3000 m
Bronze medal – third place	1992 Genoa	1500 m

Branko Zorko (born 1 July 1967) is a Croatian retired middle distance runner who specialized in the 1500 metres. Zorko competed in the 1500 metres in five Olympic Games, from 1988 to 2004, making it through to the semi-finals in 1992 and 1996. He won bronze medals at the 1993 World Indoor Championships in Toronto and the 1994 European Championships in Helsinki. In 1992 he was awarded the Franjo Bučar State Award for Sport. He was born in Hodošan.

== Running career ==
=== Early career ===
On November 20, 1984, Zorko ran his first ever race, which he won on a cross country course at the age of 17. Less than a year into training, he posted a time of 8:30 for 3000 meters and won a competitive high school race called Kros Sportskih novosti. He declined offers to train with AK Crvena Zvezda and instead remained in Križevci, where he did intervals on a track only once a week. The rest of his training took place on forest trails, where Zorko alleged that bystanders would ask him why he was running and tell him to "take a hoe and dig out some corn".

=== International ===
At his first major international competition, Zorko finished sixth in the men's 3000 metres race at the 1989 IAAF World Indoor Championships. In 1990, he won his first major medal, winning bronze at the European Indoor Championships in Glasgow. After the breakup of Yugoslavia, Zorko began specializing in middle-distance disciplines, and eventually found his talent in the 1500 metres. In 1992, Zorko won the first international medal for the newly independent Croatia, winning a bronze medal at the 1992 European Indoor Athletics Championships. A year later he won the bronze medal for the men's 1500 metres at the 1993 IAAF World Indoor Championships, finishing only 0.39 seconds behind winner Marcus O'Sullivan. Next year, Zorko finished second in the 1500 at the 1994 European Athletics Indoor Championships, and third at the 1994 European Championships in Athletics.

At the 1997 IAAF World Indoor Championships and at the 2002 European Indoor Athletics Championships, he finished in fourth place in the respective 1500 metre races.

=== Pacemaking ===
By the late 1990s, Zorko was increasingly suffering from injuries, which prompted him to turn to professional pacemaking. As a pacemaker, he assisted in setting several world records, both indoors and outdoors, most notably for Haile Gebrselassie. On July 11, 2005, Zorko announced his retirement at the IAAF Grand Prix Zagreb.

== Personal bests ==
As of 2012.

=== Outdoors ===
Distance	Mark	Date	Location
1000 m	2:18.97	2000-06-17	Zagreb
1500 m	3:33.30 NR	1998-08-08	Monte Carlo
Mile	3:52.64 NR	1998-08-05	Stockholm
2000 m	4:58.02 NR	1996-07-10	Nice
3000 m	7:48.72 NR	1998-06-01	Hengelo
5000 m	13:43.04	1989-06-04	Belgrade

=== Indoors ===
Distance	Mark	Date	Location
1000 m	2:20.35 NR	1998-02-04	Erfurt
1500 m	3:38.05 NR	1997-02-02	Stuttgart
3000 m	7:49.29 NR	1990-03-07	Piraeus

== International competitions ==
Year	Competition	Venue	Position	Event	Notes
Representing Yugoslavia
1987	Universiade	Zagreb, Yugoslavia	7th	1500 m	3:46.46
1988	European Indoor Championships	Budapest, Hungary	7th	1500 m	3:47.69
1988	Olympic Games	Seoul, South Korea	36th (h)	1500 m	3:45.52
1989	European Indoor Championships	The Hague, Netherlands	5th	3000 m	7:54.16
1989	World Indoor Championships	Budapest, Hungary	6th	3000 m	7:52.26
1989	Universiade	Duisburg, West Germany	14th (h)	1500 m	3:48.42
1990	European Indoor Championships	Glasgow, United Kingdom	3rd	3000 m	7:54.77
1990	European Championships	Split, Yugoslavia	14th (h)	1500 m	3:40.86
Representing Croatia
1992	European Indoor Championships	Genoa, Italy	3rd	1500 m	3:42.85
1992	Olympic Games	Barcelona, Spain	18th (sf)	1500 m	3:39.71
1993	World Indoor Championships	Toronto, Canada	3rd	1500 m	3:45.39
1993	World Championships	Stuttgart, Germany	21st (sf)	1500 m	3:43.12
1994	European Indoor Championships	Paris, France	2nd	1500 m	3:44.64
1994	European Championships	Helsinki, Finland	3rd	1500 m	3:36.88
1995	World Championships	Gothenburg, Sweden	36th (h)	1500 m	3:48.83
1996	European Indoor Championships	Stockholm, Sweden	5th	1500 m	3:46.82
1996	Olympic Games	Atlanta, United States	9th (sf)	1500 m	3:35.14
1997	World Indoor Championships	Paris, France	4th	1500 m	3:39.25
1997	Mediterranean Games	Bari, Italy	2nd	1500 m	3:45.17
1997	World Championships	Athens, Greece	19th (sf)	1500 m	3:41.63
1998	European Indoor Championships	Valencia, Spain	6th	1500 m	3:45.83
1998	European Championships	Budapest, Hungary	10th	1500 m	3:43.95
1999	Military World Games	Zagreb, Croatia	3rd	1500 m	3:41.06
2000	European Indoor Championships	Ghent, Belgium	10th (h)	1500 m	3:42.92
2000	Olympic Games	Sydney, Australia	36th (h)	1500 m	3:46.16
2001	World Indoor Championships	Lisbon, Portugal	9th (h)	1500 m	3:39.55
2002	European Indoor Championships	Vienna, Austria	4th	1500 m	3:50.66
2004	Olympic Games	Athens, Greece	31st (h)	1500 m	3:48.28
