= Nicole Tully =

American runner (born 1986)

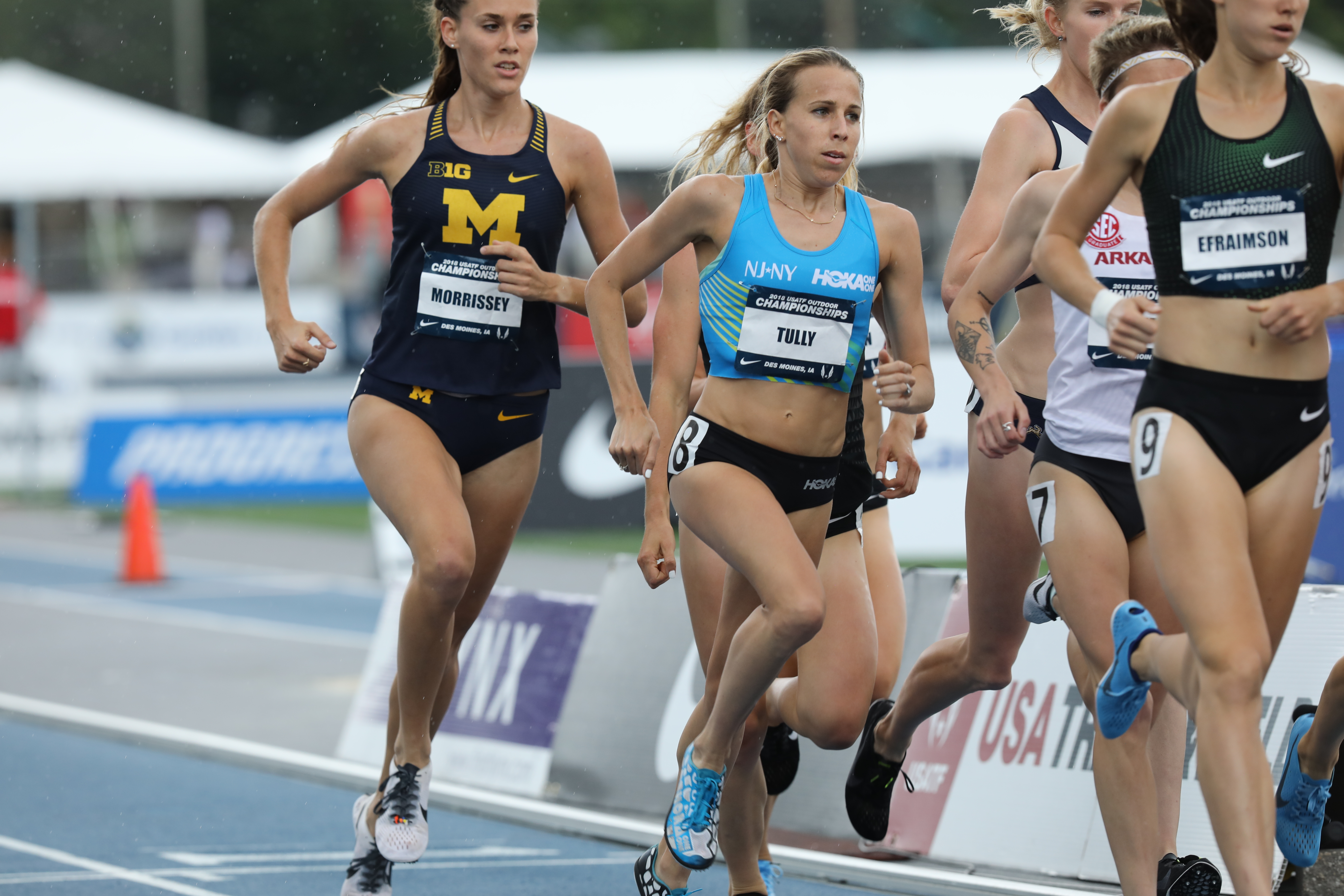
- at 2018 USA Outdoor Track and Field Championships

Personal information
- Born: Nicole Schappert; October 30, 1986 (age 39) Delray Beach, Florida, U.S.
- Height: 5 ft 1.5 in (1.562 m)
- Weight: 100 lb (45 kg)

Sport
- Country: United States
- Sport: Women's athletics
- Events: 1500 m, 3000 m, 5000 m
- College team: Villanova Wildcats
- Turned pro: 2010
- Coached by: Francis Gagliano
- Retired: 2018

Achievements and titles
- Personal bests: 1500 m: 4:05.89 Mile : 4:29.78; 3000 m: 8:55.48 5000 m: 15:04.08

Nicole Tully (née Schappert; born October 30, 1986) is an American middle- and long-distance runner. She holds best of 4:05.89 minutes for the 1500 meters and 15:05.58 minutes for the 5000 meters. She was the American national champion over the latter distance in 2015.

She ran middle-distance for Villanova University and was an NCAA All-American in 2011. She represented the United States at the Universiade in 2013.

== Career ==
=== Early life and college running ===
Born to Ken Schappert and Jane Ackerman, Tully grew up in a sporting family. Her father has competed nationally in middle-distance running and for Villanova University, while was an NCAA finalist for the school in swimming. Tully grew up in Delray Beach, Florida and won state titles in running while attending Pope John Paul II High School briefly attended Wake Forest University but, dissatisfied with her running development, transferred to her parents' alma mater. She began a business and marketing major at Villanova and met her future husband, Sean Tully, on the Villanova Wildcats track team.

Running for the Villanova Wildcats under coach Gina Procaccio, in her freshman year Tully placed sixth in the 1500 meters at the Atlantic Coast Conference championships. She was in the top thirty at the 2009 NCAA Women's Division I Cross Country Championship and was fifth in the Big East Conference championships over 1500 m. She enjoyed her most successful collegiate season during her last year at Villanova in 2011. She was twice runner-up in Big East competition (1000 m indoors, 1500 m outdoors) and came sixth at the 2010 NCAA Women's Division I Indoor Track and Field Championships over 3000 meters.

=== Professional ===
After graduation, Nicole began studying for a master's degree in communication at Rutgers University and also continued running. In 2011 she improved her 1500 m best to 4:10.02 minutes and had her first national placing at the United States 5K Championships, coming seventh.

A new best in the mile run came in 2012 and her time of 4:30.65 to win at the Morton Games ranked her in the top ten globally. She ranked tenth nationally in the 1500 m at both the USA Indoor Track and Field Championships and the United States Olympic Trials. By the end of the season she had knocked three seconds off her best, recording 4:06.87 minutes in Italy.

Nicole failed to make the national finals in 2013 but made her international debut at the Summer Universiade and made the 1500 m final, placing eighth. In her first appearance on the major international track circuit, she set a 3000 m best of 8:55.48 minutes to place tenth at the adidas Grand Prix in New York.

At the 2014 USA Outdoor Track and Field Championships, Nicole Schappert placed 17th on 1500 meters representing Hoka 1 1/NYAC in a time of 4:13.47.

Working with Frank Gagliano at NJNY Track Club, she began to run over longer distances in 2015, starting with a fourth-place finish over two miles at the 2015 USA Indoor Track and Field Championships. Nicole ran 4:11.65 in the 1500 m beating Marielle Hall in Princeton. She ran her first 5000 meters at the Payton Jordan Invitational in May and surprised by taking third in a time of 15:05.58 minutes – this met the qualifying standard for the national team and was over 25 seconds faster than she anticipated before the race. In her second outing over the distance she won the national title at the 2015 USA Outdoor Track and Field Championships, beating much favoured opposition. Tully ran 2016 Olympic standard in 1500 metres (4:05.89) in Heusden, Belgium 18 July 2015. Tully finished the 2015 year ranked 25th in the world in 5000 metres after finishing 14th in the 5000 m 2015 IAAF World Championships.

On 1 May 2016, Nicole improved her personal best in 5000 m to 15:04.08. Nicole made the 5000 m final at 2016 US Olympic Trials (track and field). Nicole ran a personal best mile at 2016 Sir Walter Miler hosted by Meredith College in 4:29.78.

== Personal records ==
Outdoor

- 800 meters – 2:02.86 min (2012)
- 1500 meters – 4:05.89 min (2015)
- Mile run – 4:29.78 min (2016)
- 3000 meters – 8:55.48 min (2014)
- 5000 meters – 15:04.08 min (2016)

Indoor

- 1500 meters – 4:12.33 min (2015)
- Mile run – 4:31.34 min (2015)
- 3000 meters – 9:00.84 min (2014)
- Two miles – 9:39.38 min (2015)

== National titles ==
- USA Outdoor Track and Field Championships
  - 5000 meters: 2015

== International competitions ==
Year	Competition	Venue	Position	Event	Notes
2013	Universiade	Kazan, Russia	8th	1500 m	4:15.02
2015	World Championships	Beijing, China	13th	5000 m	15:27.42
