= Athletics at the 1989 Summer Universiade – Men's 800 metres =

The men's 800 metres event at the 1989 Summer Universiade was held at the Wedaustadion in Duisburg with the final on 28 August 1989.

== Medalists ==
Gold	Silver	Bronze
Ari Suhonen; Finland	Ikem Billy; Great Britain	Simon Doyle; Australia

== Results ==
=== Heats ===
Rank	Heat	Athlete	Nationality	Time	Notes
1	6	Miroslav Chochkov	Bulgaria	1:50.28	Q
2	3	Ikem Billy	Great Britain	1:50.35	Q
3	6	Valeriy Starodubtsev	Soviet Union	1:50.48	Q
4	6	Luis Karin Toledo	Mexico	1:50.65	Q
5	3	Giuseppe D'Urso	Italy	1:50.69	Q
6	1	Simon Doyle	Australia	1:50.71	Q
7	3	Mike Macinko	United States	1:50.73	Q
8	1	Holger Böttcher	West Germany	1:50.85	Q
9	4	Ari Suhonen	Finland	1:50.86	Q
10	2	Réda Abdenouz	Algeria	1:51.07	Q
10	3	Mike Birke	Canada	1:51.07	q
12	4	Sergey Timofeyev	Soviet Union	1:51.14	Q
13	5	Tonny Baltus	Netherlands	1:51.15	Q
14	1	Yoshikazu Tachi	Japan	1:51.19	Q
15	1	Alex Geissbühler	Switzerland	1:51.28	q
16	2	Paul Rowbotham	Great Britain	1:51.28	Q
16	4	Ryu Tae-kyung	South Korea	1:51.28	Q
18	2	António Abrantes	Portugal	1:51.47	Q
19	5	Alfredo Lahuerta	Spain	1:51.49	Q
20	2	Geraldo de Assis	Brazil	1:51.56	q
20	6	David Moore	United States	1:51.60	q
22	5	Pierre Leveille	Canada	1:51.89	Q
22	6	Philip Tweedie	Ireland	1:51.89	q
24	4	Des English	Ireland	1:51.92	q
25	5	Joachim Heydgen	West Germany	1:51.92	
26	5	Armando Rodríguez	Mexico	1:52.13	
27	2	Frank Otto Meinseth	Norway	1:52.78	
28	3	Ousmane Diarra	Senegal	1:53.58	
29	5	Pompeu Castro	Portugal	1:53.62	
30	6	Peter Kariuki	Kenya	1:53.70	
31	1	Abdikader Omer	Somalia	1:53.85	
32	2	Luis Martínez	Guatemala	1:54.76	
33	3	Mohamed Shawki Abdullah	Qatar	1:55.87	
34	3	Lin Kuang-liang	Chinese Taipei	1:57.03	
35	2	Mohamed Alassane	Mali	1:59.35	
36	1	Wong Hung	Hong Kong	2:10.48	
37	4	Mohamed Cherif	Guinea	2:12.83	
38	3	Ndoluvualu Mukoko	Zaire	2:25.08	
	4	Elijah Dicken	Uganda	DQ	
	4	Petros Theodosiou	Cyprus	DNF	
	6	Faha Sy	Mauritania	DNF	

=== Semifinals ===
Rank	Heat	Athlete	Nationality	Time	Notes
1	3	Ikem Billy	Great Britain	1:48.94	Q
2	3	Giuseppe D'Urso	Italy	1:49.01	Q
3	3	Holger Böttcher	West Germany	1:49.23	q
4	3	Réda Abdenouz	Algeria	1:49.42	q
5	3	Pierre Leveille	Canada	1:49.47	
6	1	Valeriy Starodubtsev	Soviet Union	1:49.66	Q
7	1	Ari Suhonen	Finland	1:49.67	Q
8	1	Alex Geissbühler	Switzerland	1:49.83	
9	1	Luis Karin Toledo	Mexico	1:50.02	
10	1	Paul Rowbotham	Great Britain	1:50.26	
11	2	Simon Doyle	Australia	1:50.41	Q
12	3	Tonny Baltus	Netherlands	1:50.53	
13	2	Miroslav Chochkov	Bulgaria	1:50.63	Q
14	1	Mike Birke	Canada	1:50.66	
15	2	Mike Macinko	United States	1:50.95	
16	2	António Abrantes	Portugal	1:50.96	
17	3	Geraldo de Assis	Brazil	1:50.97	
18	1	David Moore	United States	1:51.49	
19	2	Alfredo Lahuerta	Spain	1:51.84	
20	2	Sergey Timofeyev	Soviet Union	1:52.58	
21	2	Yoshikazu Tachi	Japan	1:53.07	
22	2	Des English	Ireland	1:53.19	
23	3	Ryu Tae-kyung	South Korea	1:53.24	
24	1	Philip Tweedie	Ireland	1:54.79	

=== Final ===
Held on 30 August

Rank	Athlete	Nationality	Time	Notes
1st place, gold medalist(s)	Ari Suhonen	Finland	1:47.13	
2nd place, silver medalist(s)	Ikem Billy	Great Britain	1:47.29	
3rd place, bronze medalist(s)	Simon Doyle	Australia	1:47.48	
4	Réda Abdenouz	Algeria	1:47.69	
5	Holger Böttcher	West Germany	1:48.39	
6	Giuseppe D'Urso	Italy	1:48.84	
7	Valeriy Starodubtsev	Soviet Union	1:48.96	
8	Miroslav Chochkov	Bulgaria	1:49.09	
