= 1986 European Athletics Indoor Championships – Men's 1500 metres =

The men's 1500 metres event at the 1986 European Athletics Indoor Championships was held on 22 and 23 February.

== Medalists ==
Gold	Silver	Bronze
José Luís González; Spain	José Luis Carreira; Spain	Han Kulker; Netherlands

== Results ==
=== Heats ===
First 2 of each heat (Q) and the next 2 fastest (q) qualified for the final.

Rank	Heat	Name	Nationality	Time	Notes
1	1	José Luís González	Spain	3:45.41	Q
2	1	Han Kulker	Netherlands	3:45.56	Q
3	1	Uwe Mönkemeyer	West Germany	3:45.58	q, PB
4	1	Alessandro Lambruschini	Italy	3:47.01	q
5	3	Adelino Hidalgo	Spain	3:47.92	Q
6	3	Jan Kraus	Czechoslovakia	3:48.03	Q
7	2	Peter Wirz	Switzerland	3:48.23	Q
8	2	José Luis Carreira	Spain	3:48.24	Q
9	3	Enda Fitzpatrick	Ireland	3:48.53	
10	2	Karl Blaha	Austria	3:48.79	
11	2	Rob Harrison	Great Britain	3:48.95	
12	1	Nikolaos Tsiakoulas	Greece	3:49.54	
13	2	Claudio Patrignani	Italy	3:49.79	
14	2	Ari Paunonen	Finland	3:50.07	
15	3	Rainer Thau	West Germany	3:50.23	
16	3	Pascal Clouvel	France	3:50.54	
17	2	Vladimir Slouka	Czechoslovakia	3:51.29	
18	1	Mika Maaskola	Finland	3:55.06	
19	3	Harri Hänninen	Finland	3:57.25	

=== Final ===
Rank	Name	Nationality	Time	Notes
1st place, gold medalist(s)	José Luís González	Spain	3:44.55	
2nd place, silver medalist(s)	José Luis Carreira	Spain	3:45.07	
3rd place, bronze medalist(s)	Han Kulker	Netherlands	3:46.46	
4	Uwe Mönkemeyer	West Germany	3:46.47	
5	Peter Wirz	Switzerland	3:48.06	
6	Adelino Hidalgo	Spain	3:49.14	
7	Alessandro Lambruschini	Italy	3:49.95	
8	Jan Kraus	Czechoslovakia	3:55.77	
