= Petru Drăgoescu =

Romanian middle-distance runner

Personal information
- Born: 22 July 1962 (age 63) Petroșani, Romania
- Height: 1.83 m (6 ft 0 in)
- Weight: 69 kg (152 lb)

Sport
- Sport: Athletics
- Event: 800 metres
Medal record
Representing Romania
European Indoor Championships
Silver medal – second place	1985 Piraeus	800m

Petru Drăgoescu (first name also given as Petre; born 22 July 1962) is a Romanian former middle-distance runner who specialised in the 800 metres. He represented his country at the 1983 World Championships. In addition, he won the silver medal at the 1985 European Indoor Championships. As of December 2016, he is still the Romanian national record holder both indoors and outdoors.

== International competitions ==
Year	Competition	Venue	Position	Event	Notes
Representing Romania
1983	European Indoor Championships	Budapest, Hungary	4th	800 m	1:47.91
1983	Summer Universiade	Edmonton, Canada	12th (h)	800 m	1:49.57
1983	World Championships	Helsinki, Finland	26th (h)	800 m	1:48.33
1985	World Indoor Games	Paris, France	4th	800 m	1:48.34
1985	European Indoor Championships	Piraeus, Greece	2nd	800 m	1:49.38
1985	Summer Universiade	Kobe, Japan	4th	800 m	1:45.41
1985	Summer Universiade	Kobe, Japan	8th	1500 m	3:48.66
1988	European Indoor Championships	Budapest, Hungary	10th (sf)	800 m	1:49.24

== Personal bests ==
Outdoor

- 800 metres – 1:45.41 (Kobe 1985) NR
- 1500 metres – 3:40.38 (Athens 1984)

Indoor

- 800 metres – 1:47.21 (Pireaus 1985) NR
- 1500 metres – 3:41.02 (Budapest 1985)
