= Adelino Hidalgo =

Spanish middle-distance runner

Personal information
- Born: 8 March 1963 (age 62) Avilés, Spain

Sport
- Sport: Athletics
- Event(s): 1500 m, 3000 m

Adelino Hidalgo Menéndez (born 8 March 1963 in Avilés) is a Spanish former middle-distance runner. He represented his country in the 1500 metres at the 1989 World Indoor Championships narrowly missing the final.

== International competitions ==
Year	Competition	Venue	Position	Event	Notes
Representing Spain
1981	European Junior Championships	Utrecht, Netherlands	12th (h)	1500 m	3:56.25
1986	European Indoor Championships	Madrid, Spain	6th	1500 m	3:49.14
1988	European Indoor Championships	Budapest, Hungary	8th	1500 m	3:48.72
1988	Ibero-American Championships	Mexico City, Mexico	2nd	1500 m	3:53.10
1989	European Indoor Championships	The Hague, Netherlands	7th	3000 m	7:55.17
1989	World Indoor Championships	Budapest, Hungary	9th (h)	1500 m	3:43.95
1990	European Indoor Championships	Glasgow, United Kingdom	10th	3000 m	8:02.71

== Personal bests ==
Outdoor

- 1500 metres – 3:38.30 (A Coruña 1987)
- One mile – 3:59.59 (Barcelona 1988)
- 2000 metres – 5:05.16 (Seville 1986)
- 3000 metres – 7:55.62 (Seville 1988)

Indoor

- 1500 metres – 3:39.95 (Seville 1990)
- 3000 metres – 7:55.17 (The Hague 1989)
