= Frank Gagliano =

American track and field coach (1937–2026)

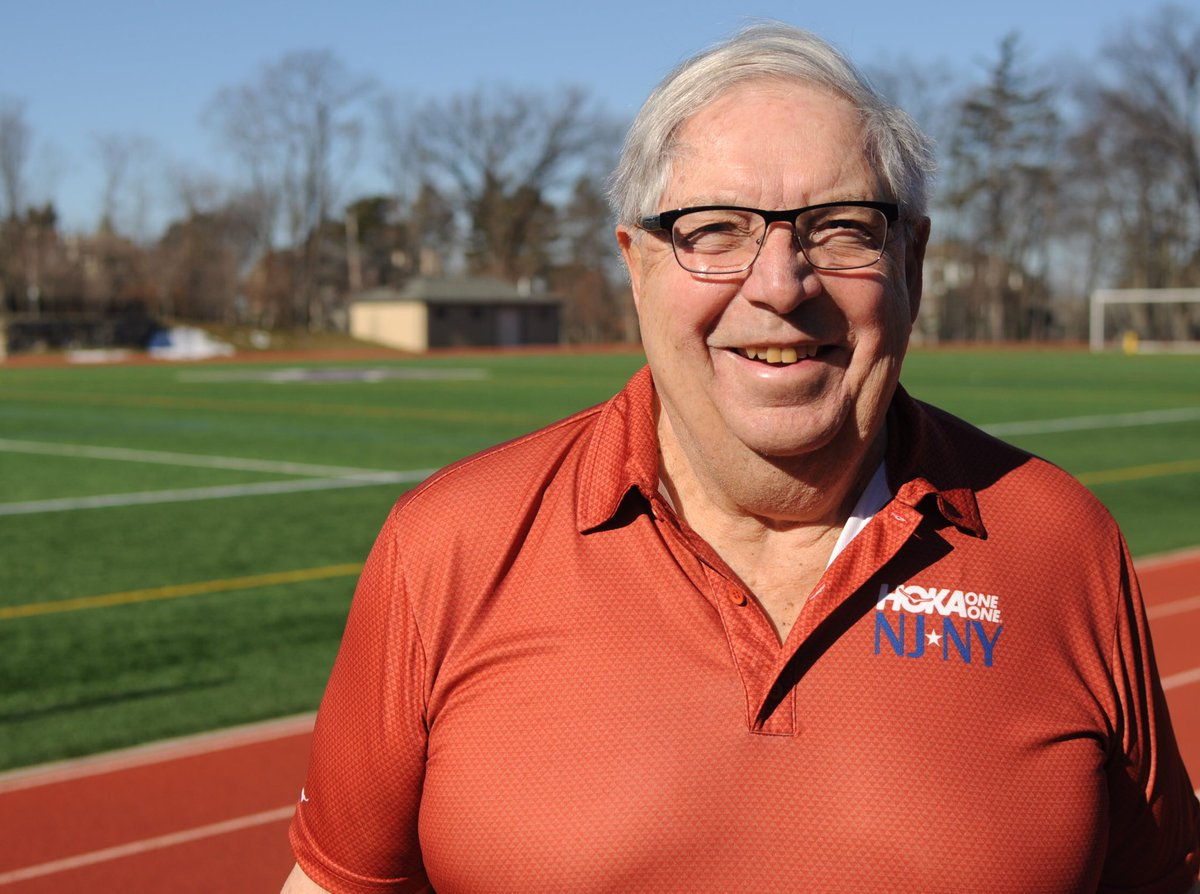
Gagliano of the New Jersey–New York Track Club

Francis Xavier Gagliano (March 20, 1937 – October 25, 2026), often referred to as Gags, was an American professional track and field coach. He coached the New Jersey–New York Track Club.

== Background ==
Francis Xavier Gagliano was born on March 20, 1937, to parents Perry and Clara Gagliano. He grew up on East 238th St in The Bronx, New York, where he attended Mount Saint Michael for high school. Gagliano would attend the University of Richmond and play quarterback for their football team while attending Officers Candidate School during a couple summers. After graduation he would spend eight years in the Marine Corps reserves. Following college he played professionally in the Canadian Football League for the Hamilton Tiger-Cats and London Lords. A year later in 1961, he moved back to marry his wife Roberta Arnold. Gagliano then became a teacher at Roselle Catholic in New Jersey and began coaching their track team. He coached 15 Olympians and 43 sub-4:00 milers.

Gagliano died October 25, 2026, at the age of 89.

== Coaching career ==
=== Roselle Catholic ===
Gagliano coached at Roselle Catholic until 1969. While there, his teams won two Championships of America wheels at the Penn Relays in 1965, three New Jersey Indoor State Championships, and a New Jersey Cross-Country State Championship.

=== Manhattan College ===
From 1969 to 1974, Gagliano served as Assistant Track & Field Coach at Manhattan College. During his tenure, the Jaspers became a powerhouse distance program winning Metropolitan and IC4A Championships, and most notably the 1973 NCAA Indoor National Championship meet. Additionally, his teams set an American 4x1 Mile Relay Record, a World Record performance in the Distance Medley Relay, numerous All-American runners and many school records. In 2017 he was inducted into the school's Athletic Hall of Fame.

=== Rutgers University ===
Starting in 1974, Gagliano coached at Rutgers University as an assistant coach and would do so until 1983. While there he coached 1976 3000 m Steeplechase Olympian, Mike Roche. Ron Speirs, who graduated from Rutgers in 1975 but remained coached by Gagliano, became Gagliano's first athlete to break 4:00 in the mile in 1977.

=== Georgetown University ===
While the head coach of Georgetown, Gagliano would turn the team into one of the most dominant programs in the country. Frank's tenure teemed with the accomplishments of his athletes: 140 All-America performers which included five Olympic athletes. There were seven individual national champions; but his primary successes were in his team training, with 23 "BIG EAST" championship teams. In the second highest collegiate tier, there were eight indoor IC4A team titles and two outdoor IC4A crowns. 58 individual IC4A champions; eight Penn Relay Championship of America titles, including a world-record-breaking distance medley relay team; and 46 school records. In 1992, he would coach John Trautmann to qualification for the 1992 Olympics in the 5000 m. He retired from college coaching in 1999, but was inducted into the school's Athletic Hall of Fame in 2006.

=== Reebok Enclave ===
In 1993, while still coaching at Georgetown University, Gagliano founded the professional running team, the Reebok Enclave. Gagliano obtained seed money from two of his former athletes, New Jersey businessmen Frank Argano and Andy Muldoon to hire two-time Olympian Matt Centrowitz as a coach. In 1997, the former Hoya and US Olympian, Steve Holman, would run 3:31.52 for 1500 m and 3:50.40 for 1 mile before qualifying for the World Championships. That same year, Rich Kenah would win bronze medals at the Indoor and Outdoor Championships and also running a personal best of 1:43.38 for 800 m that year. The group has largely been credited with beginning the re-popularization of professional distance running teams in the United States.

=== Nike Farm Team ===
After a call from Stanford's head coach, Vin Lananna, Gagliano moved to Palo Alto, CA in 2001 to coach the Nike Farm Team. There he coached Nicole Teter to the (since broken) 800 m American Record of 1:58.71 and the 2004 Olympic Games. The team also had Jonathan Riley qualify in the 5000 m for the Athens Olympics. Other notable athletes were Michael Stember, Jason Lunn, Matt Lane, and Bolota Asmerom.

=== The Oregon Track Club ===
Gagliano moved to Eugene, Oregon in 2006 to help found the Nike Oregon Track Club. There, he would once again guide Nicole Teter to another Olympic team. The group would also send Nick Symmonds and Christian Smith to Beijing to compete in the 800 m, as well as Erin Donohue in the 1500 m.

=== The New Jersey–New York Track Club ===
After moving back to New York in 2009, Gagliano soon after began working with Erin Donohue once again. Come 2010 more local athletes slowly began to join and a team had organically formed once again under Gagliano. 2011 was highlighted by Delilah DiCrescenzo's qualification for the World Championships in the 3000 m Steeplechase. Mike Rutt finished sixth in the 800 m at the 2012 World Indoor Championships. In 2012, Julie Culley's victory at the Olympic Trials to make the London Games for the 5000 m. In 2013, Ashley Higginson, finished second at the US Championships in the steeplechase to qualify for the World Championships. And in 2015 Nicole Tully would win the US Championships over 5000 m. Donn Cabral placed third in the 3000 m steeplechase to qualify for the 2016 Olympic Games.

Following the 2016 Olympic Trials, the club moved from New Jersey to Westchester, New York, and signed a sponsorship agreement with Hoka One One. In 2018, the club set a World Indoor Record for 4 × 800 m at Boston University with a time of 7:11.30 with a team composed of Joe McAsey, Kyle Merber, Chris Giesting and Jesse Garn. In 2019, Johnny Gregorek ran 3:49.98 for the 1 mile, the second fastest American all-time indoors.

In 2020, Hoka One One ended its partnership with the New Jersey–New York Track Club. Gagliano remained coach of the club.

== Sources ==
- "A Legend Lives Among Us - Coach Gagliano". Rye, NY Patch. September 20, 2013.
- "2017 Athletic Hall of Fame Profile - Frank Gagliano". Manhattan College Athletics.
- "THE EAST COAST'S PREMIERE TRACK CLUB". THE EAST COAST'S PREMIERE TRACK CLUB. Archived from the original on February 15, 2011.
