= 1988 European Athletics Indoor Championships – Men's 800 metres =

The men's 800 metres event at the 1988 European Athletics Indoor Championships was held on 5 and 6 March.

== Medalists ==
Gold	Silver	Bronze
David Sharpe; Great Britain	Rob Druppers; Netherlands	Gert Kilbert; Switzerland

== Results ==
=== Heats ===
First 2 from each heat (Q) and the next 4 fastest (q) qualified for the semifinals.

Rank	Heat	Name	Nationality	Time	Notes
1	3	Gert Kilbert	Switzerland	1:49.65	Q
2	3	Tony Morrell	Great Britain	1:49.68	Q
3	3	Colomán Trabado	Spain	1:49.72	q
4	3	Zoltán Sári	Hungary	1:50.37	q
5	4	David Sharpe	Great Britain	1:50.83	Q
6	4	Slobodan Popović	Yugoslavia	1:51.02	Q
7	4	Andrey Sudnik	Soviet Union	1:51.13	q
8	4	Joachim Heydgen	West Germany	1:51.14	q
9	4	Ari Suhonen	Finland	1:51.19	
10	1	Rob Druppers	Netherlands	1:53.12	Q
11	1	Ikem Billy	Great Britain	1:53.20	Q
12	1	István Szalai	Hungary	1:53.36	
13	1	José Arconada	Spain	1:53.49	
14	1	Álvaro Silva	Portugal	1:54.66	
15	2	Petru Drăgoescu	Romania	2:00.16	Q
16	2	Tony Ernst	Belgium	2:00.61	Q
17	2	Tomás de Teresa	Spain	2:00.65	
18	2	Predrag Melnjak	Yugoslavia	2:01.22	
	1	Herwig Tavernaro	Austria	DNF	

=== Semifinals ===
First 3 from each semifinal qualified directly (Q) for the final.

Rank	Heat	Name	Nationality	Time	Notes
1	2	Tony Morrell	Great Britain	1:48.23	Q
2	1	Rob Druppers	Netherlands	1:48.28	Q
3	2	Slobodan Popović	Yugoslavia	1:48.52	Q
4	1	Gert Kilbert	Switzerland	1:48.65	Q
5	1	David Sharpe	Great Britain	1:48.66	Q
6	2	Ikem Billy	Great Britain	1:48.70	Q
7	2	Andrey Sudnik	Soviet Union	1:48.72	
8	1	Joachim Heydgen	West Germany	1:48.76	
9	2	Colomán Trabado	Spain	1:49.08	
10	2	Petru Drăgoescu	Romania	1:49.24	
11	1	Zoltán Sári	Hungary	1:51.66	
12	1	Tony Ernst	Belgium	1:51.82	

=== Final ===
Rank	Name	Nationality	Time	Notes
1st place, gold medalist(s)	David Sharpe	Great Britain	1:49.17	
2nd place, silver medalist(s)	Rob Druppers	Netherlands	1:49.45	
3rd place, bronze medalist(s)	Gert Kilbert	Switzerland	1:49.46	
4	Tony Morrell	Great Britain	1:49.89	
5	Slobodan Popović	Yugoslavia	1:50.02	
6	Ikem Billy	Great Britain	1:50.36	
