= Vincent Terrier =

French middle-distance runner

Vincent Terrier (born 22 December 1968) is a retired French middle-distance runner who competed in the 800 and 1500 metres.

He won the bronze medal at the 1987 European Junior Championships and competed at the 1994 European Indoor Championships without reaching the final. He became French indoor champion in 1991.

His personal best times were 1:46.92 minutes in the 800 metres, achieved in July 1992 in La Roche-sur-Yon; and 3:38.85 minutes in the 1500 metres, achieved in July 1993 in Saint-Maur-des-Fossés.
