= Mário Silva (athlete) =

Portuguese middle-distance runner

Medal record

Men's athletics

Representing Portugal

European Championships
| Bronze medal – third place | 1990 Split | 1500 m |

Mário Manuel da Silva (born 23 July 1961 in Madina do Boe, Guinea-Bissau) is a retired Portuguese runner who specialized in the 1500 metres run. He won a bronze medal at the 1991 World Indoor Championships behind Noureddine Morceli and Fermín Cacho. That indoor season Silva ran in 3:36.46 minutes, which placed him third in the world ranking, again behind Morceli and Cacho.

== Achievements ==
| Year | Competition | Venue | Position | Event | Notes |
Representing Portugal
| 1983 | Ibero-American Championships | Barcelona, Spain | 5th | 800m | 1:50.11 |
| 1983 | Ibero-American Championships | Barcelona, Spain | 2nd | 1500m | 3:54.06 |
| 1986 | European Indoor Championships | Madrid, Spain | 10th (h) | 800 m | 1:52.91 |
| 1988 | European Indoor Championships | Budapest, Hungary | 6th | 3000 m | 7:58.95 |
| 1988 | Olympic Games | Seoul, South Korea | 9th | 1500 m | 3:38.77 |
| 1989 | European Indoor Championships | The Hague, Netherlands | 8th | 3000 m | 7:55.89 |
| 1989 | World Indoor Championships | Budapest, Hungary | 16th (h) | 1500 m | 3:47.92 |
| 1990 | European Indoor Championships | Glasgow, United Kingdom | 5th | 3000 m | 7:56.34 |
| 1990 | European Championships | Split, Yugoslavia | 3rd | 1500 m | 3:38.73 |
| 1991 | World Indoor Championships | Seville, Spain | 3rd | 1500 m | 3:43.85 |
| 1991 | World Championships | Tokyo, Japan | 6th | 1500 m | 3:35.76 |
| 1993 | World Indoor Championships | Toronto, Canada | 7th | 1500 m | 3:46.61 |
| 1993 | World Championships | Stuttgart, Germany | 19th (sf) | 1500 m | 3:42.85 |
| 1994 | European Indoor Championships | Paris, France | – | 1500 m | DNF |
| 1994 | European Indoor Championships | Paris, France | 2nd (h) | 3000 m | 7:57.45 |

Awards
| Preceded by (Portugal) Bernardo Marques | Olympic Medal Nobre Guedes; 1990 | Succeeded by (Portugal) Vítor Hugo (Portugal) Manuel Barroso |
