= Andrés Vera =

Spanish middle-distance runner

Personal information
- Born: 31 December 1960 (age 65) Castellón de la Plana, Spain
- Height: 1.86 m (6 ft 1 in)
- Weight: 72 kg (159 lb)

Sport
- Sport: Athletics
- Events: 800 m, 1500 m
Medal record
Representing Spain
Mediterranean Games
Bronze medal – third place	1987 Latakia	800m

Andrés Vera Llorens (born 31 December 1960) is a retired Spanish middle-distance runner who specialised in the 1500 metres. He represented his country at the 1984 Summer Olympics, where he finished seventh in the final, as well as one outdoor and one indoor World Championships.

== International competitions ==
Year	Competition	Venue	Position	Event	Notes
Representing Spain
1982	European Championships	Athens, Greece	13th (sf)	800 m	1:49.35
1983	European Indoor Championships	Budapest, Hungary	7th (sf)	800 m	1:50.42
1983	Universiade	Edmonton, Canada	4th	1500 m	3:41.27
1983	Mediterranean Games	Casablanca, Morocco	3rd (h)	800 m	1:49.75
1984	Olympic Games	Los Angeles, United States	7th	1500 m	3:37.02
1985	World Indoor Games	Paris, France	8th	1500 m	3:52.89
1985	European Indoor Championships	Piraeus, Greece	4th	1500 m	3:40.56
1985	Universiade	Kobe, Japan	12th	1500 m	3:52.02
1986	Ibero-American Championships	Havana, Cuba	2nd	1500 m	3:44.99
1987	European Indoor Championships	Liévin, France	6th	1500 m	3:47.89
1987	World Championships	Rome, Italy	30th (h)	1500 m	3:43.24
1987	Mediterranean Games	Latakia, Syria	3rd	800 m	1:50.37
1987	Mediterranean Games	Latakia, Syria	10th	1500 m	3:45.33
1988	European Indoor Championships	Budapest, Hungary	8th (h)	1500 m	3:43.65

== Personal bests ==
Outdoor

- 800 metres – 1:46.85 (Madrid 1984)
- 1000 metres – 2:17.78 (Nice 1985)
- 1500 metres – 3:35.86 (A Coruña 1986)
- One mile – 3:55.33 (Oslo 1984)
- 2000 metres – 5:02.78 (Seville 1986)

Indoor

- 800 metres – 1:50.09 (Budapest 1983)
- 1500 metres – 3:40.51 (Piraeus 1985)
