= 1992 European Athletics Indoor Championships – Men's 1500 metres =

The men's 1500 metres event at the 1992 European Athletics Indoor Championships was held in Palasport di Genova on 29 February and 1 March.

== Medalists ==
Gold	Silver	Bronze
Matthew Yates; Great Britain	Sergey Melnikov; Unified Team	Branko Zorko; Croatia

== Results ==
=== Heats ===
First 2 from each heat (Q) and the next 3 fastest (q) qualified for the final.

Rank	Heat	Name	Nationality	Time	Notes
1	3	Matthew Yates	Great Britain	3:42.03	Q
2	3	Hervé Phélippeau	France	3:42.55	Q
3	3	Eugenio Ferrara	Italy	3:42.68	q
4	3	Bernhard Richter	Austria	3:43.40	q
5	3	Mateo Cañellas	Spain	3:43.44	q
6	2	Branko Zorko	Croatia	3:44.14	Q
7	2	Isaac Viciosa	Spain	3:44.36	Q
8	2	Jason Dullforce	Great Britain	3:44.38	
9	2	Marc Corstjens	Belgium	3:44.75	
10	1	Sergey Melnikov	Unified Team	3:44.80	Q
11	1	Amos Rota	Italy	3:45.00	Q
12	1	António Monteiro	Portugal	3:45.20	
13	1	Christophe Impens	Belgium	3:45.24	
14	2	Ari Suhonen	Finland	3:45.94	
15	1	Enrique Molina	Spain	3:46.10	
16	2	Jörg Schneider	Germany	3:46.26	
17	1	Hocine Ameur	France	3:46.90	
	3	Cândido Maia	Portugal	DNF	
	1	Kai Jenkel	Switzerland	DNS	
	2	Michael Buchleitner	Austria	DNS	

=== Final ===
Rank	Name	Nationality	Time	Notes
1st place, gold medalist(s)	Matthew Yates	Great Britain	3:42.32	
2nd place, silver medalist(s)	Sergey Melnikov	Unified Team	3:42.44	
3rd place, bronze medalist(s)	Branko Zorko	Croatia	3:42.85	
4	Isaac Viciosa	Spain	3:43.23	
5	Amos Rota	Italy	3:43.99	
6	Hervé Phélippeau	France	3:44.71	
7	Bernhard Richter	Austria	3:46.35	
8	Eugenio Ferrara	Italy	3:47.64	
9	Mateo Cañellas	Spain	3:51.15	
