= 1988 European Athletics Indoor Championships – Men's 1500 metres =

The men's 1500 metres event at the 1988 European Athletics Indoor Championships was held on 5 and 6 March.

== Medalists ==
Gold	Silver	Bronze
Ari Suhonen; Finland	Ronny Olsson; Sweden	Rüdiger Horn; East Germany

== Results ==
=== Heats ===
First 2 from each heat (Q) and the next 3 fastest (q) qualified for the final.

Rank	Heat	Name	Nationality	Time	Notes
1	2	Rüdiger Horn	East Germany	3:41.82	Q
2	2	Adelino Hidalgo	Spain	3:42.29	Q
3	2	Jan Kraus	Czechoslovakia	3:42.51	q
4	2	István Knipl	Hungary	3:42.64	q
5	2	Antonio Monteiro	Portugal	3:42.75	q
6	1	Tonino Viali	Italy	3:42.88	Q
7	1	Ronny Olsson	Sweden	3:43.48	Q
8	1	Andrés Vera	Spain	3:43.65	
9	1	Tom Hanlon	Great Britain	3:43.75	
10	2	Johan Engholm	Sweden	3:44.14	
11	2	Mark Kirk	Great Britain	3:44.35	
12	1	Tamás Pocsai	Hungary	3:44.38	
13	3	Ari Suhonen	Finland	3:46.33	Q
14	3	Branko Zorko	Yugoslavia	3:46.39	Q
15	3	Enda Fitzpatrick	Ireland	3:46.83	
16	3	José Moreira	Portugal	3:47.22	
17	3	József Bereczki	Hungary	3:50.29	
18	3	Marc Borghans	Netherlands	3:56.38	
19	1	Peter Svaricek	Austria	4:02.90	
	1	Thorsten Lenhardt	East Germany	DNF	

=== Final ===
Rank	Name	Nationality	Time	Notes
1st place, gold medalist(s)	Ari Suhonen	Finland	3:45.72	
2nd place, silver medalist(s)	Ronny Olsson	Sweden	3:46.16	
3rd place, bronze medalist(s)	Rüdiger Horn	East Germany	3:46.51	
4	István Knipl	Hungary	3:46.56	
5	Antonio Monteiro	Portugal	3:46.79	
6	Tonino Viali	Italy	3:46.96	
7	Branko Zorko	Yugoslavia	3:47.69	
8	Adelino Hidalgo	Spain	3:48.72	
9	Jan Kraus	Czechoslovakia	3:49.60	
