= 1985 European Athletics Indoor Championships – Men's 1500 metres =

The men's 1500 metres event at the 1985 European Athletics Indoor Championships was held on 2 and 3 March.

== Medalists ==
Gold	Silver	Bronze
José Luis González; Spain	Marcus O'Sullivan; Ireland	José Luis Carreira; Spain

== Results ==
=== Heats ===
First 3 from each heat (Q) and the next 3 fastest (q) qualified for the final.

Rank	Heat	Name	Nationality	Time	Notes
1	1	Antti Loikkanen	Finland	3:40.42	Q
2	2	José Luis González	Spain	3:40.44	Q
3	1	Andrés Vera	Spain	3:40.51	Q
4	2	José Luis Carreira	Spain	3:40.55	Q
5	1	Stefano Mei	Italy	3:40.66	Q
6	2	Uwe Becker	West Germany	3:40.89	Q
7	2	Marcus O'Sullivan	Ireland	3:41.09	q
8	2	Riccardo Materazzi	Italy	3:41.37	q
9	1	Johnny Kroon	Sweden	3:41.40	q
10	1	István Knipl	Hungary	3:41.55	
11	1	Han Kulker	Netherlands	3:41.88	
12	1	Carlos Cabral	Portugal	3:42.20	
13	2	Mirosław Żerkowski	Poland	3:43.63	
14	2	Gerald Miedler	Austria	3:47.11	
15	1	Jürgen Grothe	West Germany	3:48.44	
	1	Viktor Kalinkin	Soviet Union	DNS	
	2	Leonid Masunov	Soviet Union	DNS	

=== Final ===
Rank	Name	Nationality	Time	Notes
1st place, gold medalist(s)	José Luis González	Spain	3:39.26	
2nd place, silver medalist(s)	Marcus O'Sullivan	Ireland	3:39.75	
3rd place, bronze medalist(s)	José Luis Carreira	Spain	3:40.43	
4	Andrés Vera	Spain	3:40.56	
5	Riccardo Materazzi	Italy	3:40.85	
6	Antti Loikkanen	Finland	3:41.19	
7	Stefano Mei	Italy	3:41.26	
8	Johnny Kroon	Sweden	3:45.91	
	Uwe Becker	West Germany	DNS	
