= Hervé Phélippeau =

French middle-distance runner

Personal information
- Born: 16 September 1962 (age 63) Lorient, France

Sport
- Sport: Athletics
- Event: 1500 metres

Hervé Phélippeau (born 16 September 1962 in Lorient) is a retired French middle-distance runner who competed primarily in the 1500 metres. He won the gold medal at the 1989 European Indoor Championships. In addition, he represented his country at two World Indoor Championships.

== International competitions ==
Year	Competition	Venue	Position	Event	Notes
Representing France
1987	European Indoor Championships	Liévin, France	5th	1500 m	3:46.16
1987	World Indoor Championships	Indianapolis, United States	13th (h)	800 m	3:45.26
1987	Mediterranean Games	Latakia, Syria	6th	800 m	3:42.45
1989	European Indoor Championships	The Hague, Netherlands	1st	1500 m	3:47.42
1989	World Indoor Championships	Budapest, Hungary	5th	800 m	3:38.76
1990	European Indoor Championships	Split, Yugoslavia	13th (h)	1500 m	3:40.72
1992	European Indoor Championships	Genoa, Italy	6th	1500 m	3:44.71

== Personal bests ==
Outdoor

- 800 metres – 1:47.03 (Viareggio 1989)
- 1000 metres – 2:19.4 (Vannes 1989)
- 1500 metres – 3:33.54 (Bologna 1990)
- One mile – 3:52.57 (Berlin 1989)
- 3000 metres – 7:53.5 (Lorient 1990)

Indoor

- 1000 metres – 2:20.31 (Liévin 1993)
- 1500 metres – 3:36.98 (Seville 1990)
