= 1985 IAAF World Indoor Games – Men's 800 metres =

The men's 800 metres event at the 1985 IAAF World Indoor Games was held at the Palais Omnisports Paris-Bercy on 18 and 19 January.

== Medalists ==
Gold	Silver	Bronze
Colomán Trabado; Spain	Benjamín González; Spain	Ikem Billy; Great Britain

== Results ==
=== Heats ===
First 2 of each heat (Q) and next 2 fastest (q) qualified for the final.

Rank	Heat	Name	Nationality	Time	Notes
1	1	Petru Drăgoescu	Romania	1:49.20	Q
2	1	Benjamín González	Spain	1:49.40	Q
3	1	Ikem Billy	Great Britain	1:49.66	q
4	2	Colomán Trabado	Spain	1:50.33	Q
5	1	André Lavie	France	1:50.54	q
6	2	Tonino Viali	Italy	1:50.82	Q
7	2	Didier Marquant	France	1:50.98	
8	2	Roland Weedon	Great Britain	1:51.17	
9	1	Jack McIntosh	United States	1:52.85	
10	2	Luis Migueles	Argentina	1:53.89	
11	1	Assar Hassan Allah	Sudan	1:56.27	NR
12	1	Yeung Sai Mo	Hong Kong	1:56.47	NR
13	2	Khaled Khalifa	Kuwait	1:57.30	
	1	Edwin Koech	Kenya	DNS	

=== Final ===
Rank	Name	Nationality	Time	Notes
1st place, gold medalist(s)	Colomán Trabado	Spain	1:47.42	
2nd place, silver medalist(s)	Benjamín González	Spain	1:47.94	
3rd place, bronze medalist(s)	Ikem Billy	Great Britain	1:48.28	
4	Petru Drăgoescu	Romania	1:48.34	
5	André Lavie	France	1:50.29	
6	Tonino Viali	Italy	1:50.85	
