= Tom Ansberry =

American long-distance runner

Personal information
- Born: August 22, 1963 (age 63) Tucson, Arizona, United States

Sport
- Sport: Long-distance running

Tom Ansberry (born August 22, 1963) is an American former long-distance runner.

== Amateur career ==
Ansberry was the 1979 and 1980 Arizona Interscholastic Association cross country state champion.

In college he competed at the University of Arizona He was the 1983 and 1984 Pacific-10 Conference champion and All-American in cross country.

== Domestic career ==
Ansberry finished 7th in the 10,000 meters at the 1984 Olympic Trials, and 5th in the 10,000 meters at the 1992 Olympic Trials.

In 1994 Ansberry won the 10,000 meter title at the USA Outdoor Track and Field Championships.

== International career ==
At the 1982 IAAF World Cross Country Championships – Junior men's race Ansberry finished 14th.

At the 1989 IAAF World Cross Country Championships – Senior men's race he finished 81st.

At the 1995 World Championships in Athletics – Men's 10,000 metres he finished 16th in heat 2.
