= Simon Doyle =

Australian middle-distance runner

Personal information
- Born: 9 November 1966 (age 60) Queensland, Australia

Sport
- Sport: Track and field
Medal record
Representing Australia
Summer Universiade
Bronze medal – third place	1989 Duisburg	800m

Simon Patrick Doyle (born 9 November 1966) is a former Australian 1500 m runner who came fourth in the 1990 Commonwealth Games in Auckland and twelfth in the World Championships' final in Tokyo. In 1990, Doyle won three Grand Prix meetings. In 1991, he set Australian records for 1500 m at 3:31.96 min and the Mile at 3:49.91 min. He missed the 1992 Summer Olympics due to injuries.

Doyle's mile record was broken in 2005 by Craig Mottram, while his 1500m record stood until Ryan Gregson exceeded it in 2010.

== Achievements ==
Year	Tournament	Venue	Result	Event
1989	Summer Universiade	Duisburg, West Germany	3rd	800 m
1990	Australian National Championships	Melbourne, Australia	1st	5000 m
1990	Commonwealth Games	Auckland, New Zealand	4th	1500 m
1991	World Championships	Tokyo, Japan	12th	1500 m
1993	World Championships	Stuttgart, Germany	9th	1500 m
1994	Commonwealth Games	Victoria, British Columbia, Canada	16th	1500 m
