= Villaluenga de la Sagra =

- Municipality
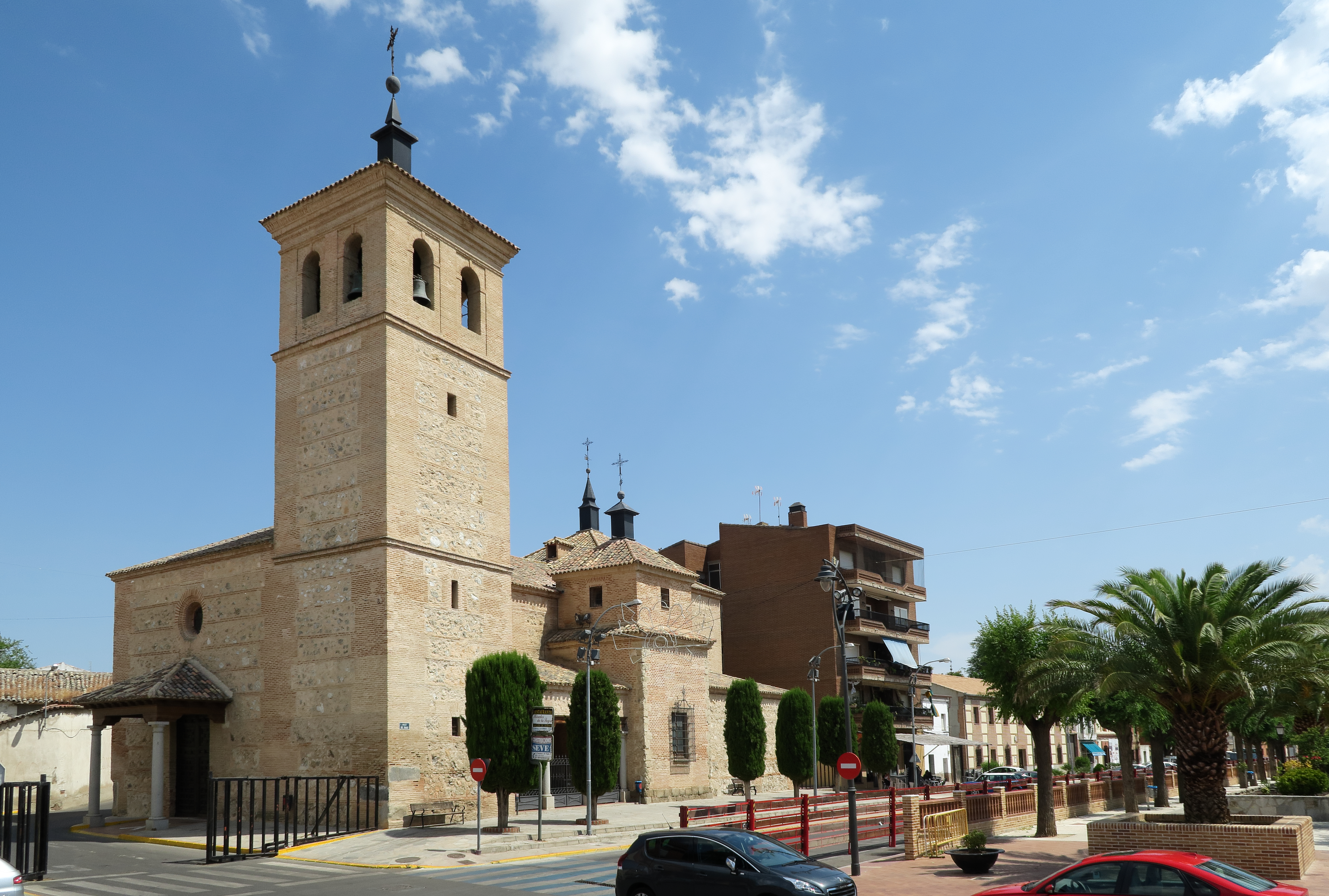

- Coat of arms

- Location in Spain
- Coordinates: 40°1′49″N 3°54′37″W
- Country: Spain
- Autonomous community: Castile-La Mancha
- Province: Toledo
- Municipality: Villaluenga de la Sagra

Area
  - Total: 27 km^{2} (10 sq mi)
- Elevation: 520 m (1,710 ft)

Population (2025-01-01)
  - Total: 4,308
  - Density: 160/km^{2} (410/sq mi)
- Time zone: UTC+1 (CET)
  - Summer (DST): UTC+2 (CEST)

Villaluenga de la Sagra is a municipality located in the province of Toledo, Castile-La Mancha, Spain. According to the 2006 census (INE), the municipality had a population of 3,216 inhabitants.
