= Thierry Tonnelier =

French athletics competitor

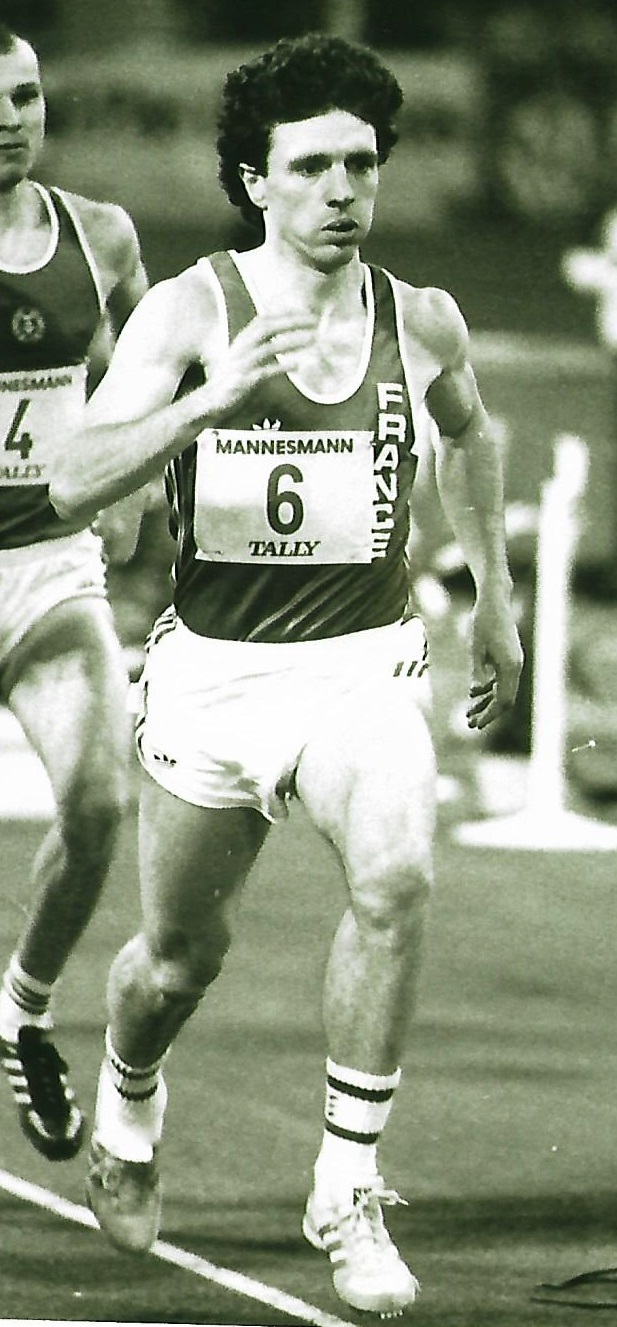
PHOTO THIERRY ATHLETISME recadree

Thierry Tonnelier (born 28 December 1959) is a retired French middle-distance runner who competed primarily in the 800 metres.

He won the bronze medals at the 1983 European Indoor Championships and the 1986 European Indoor Championships He became French indoor champion in 1984 and 1985.

His personal best time was 1:47.1 minutes, achieved in June 1982 in Saint-Maur-des-Fossés.
