= Ranieri Carenza =

Italian long-distance runner (born 1963)

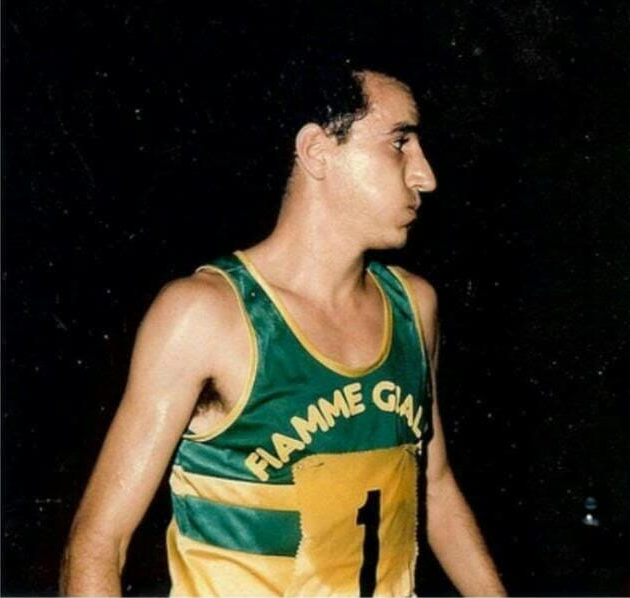
- Ranieri Carenza

Personal information
- Nationality: Italian
- Born: 4 February 1963 (age 63)

Sport
- Country: Italy
- Sport: Athletics
- Event: Long-distance running

Achievements and titles
- Personal bests: 5000 m: 13:35.12 (1987); 10,000: 28:40.15 (1990)
Medal record
World Cross Country Championships
Silver medal – second place	1982 Rome	Junior Team

Ranieri Carenza (born 4 February 1963) is an Italian male former long-distance runner who competed at five editions of the IAAF World Cross Country Championships at senior level (from 1983 to 1988). He won one national championships at senior level (1987).

== Achievements ==
Year	Competition	Venue	Position	Event	Time	Notes
1988	European Indoor Championships	(Hungary) Budapest	8th	3000 m	8:03.18	
