= Mikhail Dasko =

Russian long-distance runner

Medal record

Men's athletics

Representing the Soviet Union

European Indoor Championships
Bronze medal – third place	1988 Budapest	3000 m

IAAF World Cup
Bronze medal – third place	1992 Havana	10,000 m

Mikhail Antonovich Dasko (Russian: Михаил Антонович Дасько; born 26 January 1961) is a Russian former long-distance runner who competed for the Soviet Union and later Russia. He was a bronze medallist at both the European Athletics Indoor Championships in 1988 and the 1992 IAAF World Cup. He represented the Soviet Union at the 1988 Seoul Olympics.

Born in Zashchebye in the Gomel Region of the Belarusian SSR, he became prominent at national level in the mid-1980s with a 5000 m win at the Soviet Athletics Championships. He went on to win that title three more times, in a consecutive run from 1989 to 1991. He also did a national distance double with 10,000 metres titles in 1990 and 1991. Indoors, he won the 3000 metres in 1990 and a 3000/5000 m indoor double in 1991 (meaning he won all the distance indoor and outdoor Soviet track titles that year).

His first major medal (a 3000 m bronze) came at the 1988 European Athletics Indoor Championships. He represented the Soviet Union later that year at the Summer Olympics and was a semi-finalist. Further bronze medals followed at the 1989 European Cup then the 1990 Goodwill Games. He would later claim another bronze, over 10,000 m, at the 1992 IAAF World Cup.

Dasko competed four times at the IAAF World Cross Country Championships, twice for the Soviet Union and twice for Russia. His best finish was 32nd place at the 1991 edition. His two other global performances brought tenth in the 3000 m at the 1989 IAAF World Indoor Championships and an appearance in the first round of the 5000 m at the 1991 World Championships in Athletics.

He also competed internationally at the 1986 Goodwill Games, 1992 International Chiba Ekiden and the 1994 European Cross Country Championships.

== Personal bests ==
- 3000 metres – 7:42.00 min (1989)
- 3000 metres indoors – 7:51.83 min (1989)
- 5000 metres – 13:16.73 min (1991)
- 5000 metres indoors – 13:46.12 min (1991)
- 10,000 metres – 28:37.37 min (1990)

All information from All-Athletics

== International competitions ==
Year	Competition	Venue	Position	Event	Notes
1986	Goodwill Games	Moscow, Soviet Union	4th	5000 m	13:49.87
1988	European Indoor Championships	Budapest, Hungary	3rd	3000 m	7:56.51
1988	Olympic Games	Seoul, South Korea	25th	5000 m	13:43.65
1989	World Cross Country Championships	Stavanger, Norway	101st	Senior race	42:59
1989	World Cross Country Championships	Stavanger, Norway	18th	Senior team	642 pts
1989	World Indoor Championships	Budapest, Hungary	10th	3000 m	7:54.80
1989	European Cup	Gateshead, United Kingdom	3rd	5000 m	13:47.56
1990	European Indoor Championships	Glasgow, United Kingdom	4th	3000 m	7:55.22
1990	European Championships	Split, Yugoslavia	6th (q)	5000 m	13:47.04
1990	Goodwill Games	Seattle, United States	3rd	5000 m	13:36.44
1991	World Cross Country Championships	Antwerp, Belgium	32nd	Senior race	35:04
1991	World Cross Country Championships	Antwerp, Belgium	8th	Senior team	409 pts
1991	World Championships	Tokyo, Japan	7th (q)	5000 m	13:59.71
1991	IAAF Grand Prix Final	Barcelona, Spain	5th	5000 m	13:27.77
1992	IAAF World Cup	Havana, Cuba	3rd	10,000 m	29:00.26
1992	International Chiba Ekiden	Chiba, Japan	7th	Ekiden	14:12 (leg)
1993	World Cross Country Championships	Amorebieta, Spain	77th	Senior race	34:59
1993	World Cross Country Championships	Amorebieta, Spain	11th	Senior team	528 pts
1994	World Cross Country Championships	Amorebieta, Spain	84th	Senior race	36:52
1994	World Cross Country Championships	Amorebieta, Spain	9th	Senior team	454 pts
1994	European Cross Country Championships	Alnwick, United Kingdom	55th	Senior race	29:23

== National titles ==
- Soviet Athletics Championships
  - 5000 m: 1986, 1989, 1990, 1991
  - 10,000 m: 1990, 1991
- Soviet Indoor Athletics Championships
  - 3000 m: 1990, 1991
  - 5000 m: 1991

== See also ==
- List of 5000 metres national champions (men)
