= Jeff Atkinson (runner) =

American middle-distance runner

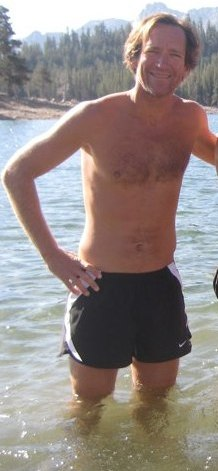
- Atkinson in 2009

Personal information
- Nationality: American
- Born: February 24, 1963 (age 63) Manhattan Beach, California, U.S.

Sport
- Sport: Track
- Events: 1500 metres, mile
- College team: Stanford

Achievements and titles
- Highest world ranking: 3rd in 1500m (1988)
- Personal bests: 1500m: 3:35.15; Mile: 3:52.80
Medal record
Men's athletics
Representing the United States
IAAF World Indoor Championships
Bronze medal – third place	1989 Budapest	Men's 1500m
- Updated on October 25, 2018

Jeffrey Patrick Atkinson (born February 24, 1963) is a male former middle-distance runner from the United States. He has held the outdoor mile record at Stanford University since 1986. He was the fastest American male in the 1500m race in 1989. He competed at the Summer Olympics in 1988 in Seoul, South Korea, and came in tenth place in the 1500m race. He tried to make a comeback at the 1992 Summer Olympics in Barcelona, but he did not pass the Olympic trials.

== Coaching ==
Atkinson currently holds coaching positions in both cross country and track and field at San Pedro High School in San Pedro, California. Atkinson previously coached at Mira Costa High School, where he worked with the head coach of cross country, Roberto Calderon, starting in 2015. Before that, Atkinson and fellow head coach Brian Shapiro coached both the boys' and girls' cross country programs at Palos Verdes High School to much success. In 2007, both varsity teams competed in the Division III CIF Southern Section Finals and State Championships. The boys' team won a CIF-SS title and a CIF State Championship title respectively in 2009 and 2011 (setting record team times for Division III) and competed at the Nike Cross Nationals in 2009. The girls' team won a Southern Section title in 2010, 2011, 2013, and 2014, and a CIF State Championship title in 2011 and 2014.

== Stanford track record ==
3:55.16 Mile, 1986 (outdoors)

== Former United States track record holder ==
1500m: 3:38.12 in 1989 (record was broken by Bernard Lagat in 2005) – indoor American record

== Personal records ==
- 800m: 1:48
- 1500m: 3:35.15
- Mile: 3:52.80
- 5 km road: 14:01
- 10 km road: 29:56
- Marathon: 2:46

== Marathon career ==
2005: won Catalina Marathon in 3:05:27 which today is the masters' record.
