= Mickaël Damian =

French middle-distance runner

Personal information
- Nationality: French
- Born: 9 November 1969 (age 56)

Sport
- Sport: Middle-distance running
- Event: 1500 metres

Mickaël Damian (born 9 November 1969) is a French middle-distance runner. He competed in the men's 1500 metres at the 1996 Summer Olympics.
