= David Maxwell Strang =

British athlete

David Strang
Personal information
- Nationality: British (Scottish)
- Born: 13 December 1968 (age 57) Girvan, Scotland
- Height: 181 cm (5 ft 11 in)
- Weight: 68 kg (150 lb)

Sport
- Sport: Athletics
- Event: Middle-distance
- Club: Haringey AC
Medal record
Representing Scotland
Commonwealth Games
Silver medal – second place	1990 Auckland	4x400m relay

David Maxwell Strang (born 13 December 1968) is a Scottish former middle-distance runner who competed at the 1996 Summer Olympics.

== Biography ==
Strang won a gold medal at the 1994 European Indoor Championships in Paris and a silver medal at the 1993 World Indoor Championships in Toronto over 1500 metres.

Strang was a three-times runner-up at the AAA Championships, twice over 800 metres in 1995 and 1996 and once over 1500 metres in 1994.

Competing for the Stanford Cardinal track and field team, Strang finished 7th in the 800 m at the 1991 NCAA Division I Outdoor Track and Field Championships.
