= Hauke Fuhlbrügge =

German middle-distance runner

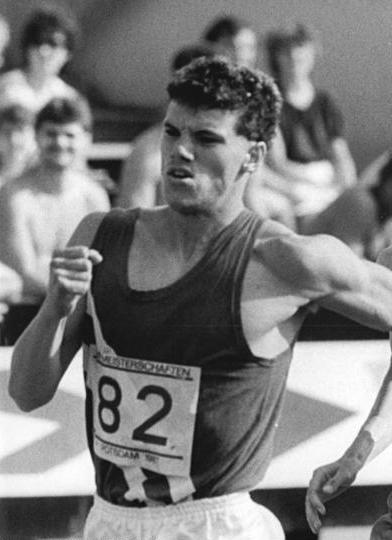
- Fuhlbrügge in 1987

Personal information
- Born: 21 March 1966 (age 60) Friedrichroda, East Germany
Medal record
Men's athletics
Representing East Germany
Summer Universiade
Gold medal – first place	1987 Zagreb	800 m
World Indoor Championships
Silver medal – second place	1989 Budapest	1500 m
Representing Germany
World Championships
Bronze medal – third place	1991 Tokyo	1500 m

Hauke Fuhlbrügge (born 21 March 1966) is a German former middle-distance runner.

== Biography ==
He won the bronze medal at the 1991 World Championships in Tokyo over 1500 metres. He also won a silver medal at the 1989 World Indoor Championships and a gold medal at the 1987 Summer Universiade. Fuhlbrügge qualified for the Olympic Games in Barcelona 1992 but went out in the semi-finals. He set personal bests of 1:45.15 minutes for 800 metres in 1989 and 3:34.15 minutes for 1500 metres in 1991. The latter result places him tenth on the German all-time performers list, behind Thomas Wessinghage, Harald Hudak, Jens-Peter Herold, Dieter Baumann, Rüdiger Stenzel, Jürgen Straub, Willi Wülbeck and Andreas Busse.

Fuhlbrügge did not participate in the 1993 World Championships as he had come only fourth in the German championships.

Hauke Fuhlbrügge competed for East Germany before reunification and represented the sports club SC Turbine Erfurt.
