= Jacky Carlier =

French long-distance runner

Jacky Carlier (born 8 November 1961) is a French athlete specialising in middle-distance track events.

Bronze medallist over 3000m at the 1989 European Athletics Indoor Championships in The Hague, behind German Dieter Baumann and Spaniard Abel Antón, he got his second podium the following year, in 1990 in Glasgow, beaten in the final by his compatriot Eric Dubus.

He also won four titles at the French Athletics Championships : over 1500m in 1988, and over 3000 m in 1988, 1989 and 1995.

== Personal records ==
- 3000 m : 7 min 52 s 64 (1995)
- 3000 m (indoor) : 7 min 53 s 16 (1989)
- 5000 m : 13 min 25 s 14 (1994)
