= 1989 IAAF World Indoor Championships =

2nd IAAF World Indoor Championships
- Dates: 3 March – 5 March
- Host city: Budapest, Hungary
- Venue: Budapest Sportcsarnok
- Events: 24
- Participation: 373 athletes from 61 nations

The 2nd IAAF World Indoor Championships in Athletics were held at the Budapest Sportcsarnok in Budapest, Hungary from March 3 to March 5, 1989. There were a total number of 373 participating athletes from 62 countries.

== Results ==
=== Men ===
1985 | 1987 | 1989 | 1991 | 1993

Event	Gold		Silver		Bronze	
60 metres	Andrés Simón; Cuba	6.52	John Myles-Mills; Ghana	6.59	Pierfrancesco Pavoni; Italy	6.61
200 metres	John Regis; Great Britain	20.54 (CR)	Ade Mafe; Great Britain	20.87	Kevin Little; United States	21.12
400 metres	Antonio McKay; United States	45.59 (CR)	Ian Morris; Trinidad and Tobago	46.09	Cayetano Cornet; Spain	46.40
800 metres	Paul Ereng; Kenya	1:44.84 (WR)	José Luíz Barbosa; Brazil	1:45.55	Tonino Viali; Italy	1:46.95
1500 metres	Marcus O'Sullivan; Ireland	3:36.64 (CR)	Hauke Fuhlbrügge; East Germany	3:37.80	Jeff Atkinson; United States	3:38.12
3000 metres	Saïd Aouita; Morocco	7:47.94 (CR)	José Luis González; Spain	7:48.66	Dieter Baumann; West Germany	7:50.47
60 metres hurdles	Roger Kingdom; United States	7.43 (CR)	Colin Jackson; Great Britain	7.45	Igors Kazanovs; Soviet Union	7.59
5000 metres walk	Mikhail Shchennikov; Soviet Union	18:27.10 (CR)	Roman Mrázek; Czechoslovakia	18:28.90	Frants Kostyukevich; Soviet Union	18:34.07
High jump	Javier Sotomayor; Cuba	2.43 (WR)	Dietmar Mögenburg; West Germany	2.35	Patrik Sjöberg; Sweden	2.35
Pole vault	Radion Gataullin; Soviet Union	5.85 (CR)	Grigoriy Yegorov; Soviet Union	5.80	Joe Dial; United States	5.70
Long jump	Larry Myricks; United States	8.37 (CR)	Dietmar Haaf; West Germany	8.17	Mike Conley; United States	8.11
Triple jump	Mike Conley; United States	17.65 (CR)	Jorge Reyna; Cuba	17.41	Juan Miguel López; Cuba	17.28
Shot put	Ulf Timmermann; East Germany	21.75	Randy Barnes; United States	21.28	Georg Andersen; Norway	20.98 (NR)

=== Women ===
1985 | 1987 | 1989 | 1991 | 1993

Event	Gold		Silver		Bronze	
60 metres	Nelli Fiere-Cooman; Netherlands	7.05 (CR)	Gwen Torrence; United States	7.07	Merlene Ottey; Jamaica	7.10
200 metres	Merlene Ottey; Jamaica	22.34 (CR)	Grace Jackson; Jamaica	22.95	Natalya Kovtun; Soviet Union	23.28
400 metres	Helga Arendt; West Germany	51.52 (CR)	Diane Dixon; United States	51.77	Jillian Richardson; Canada	52.02
800 metres	Christine Wachtel; East Germany	1:59.24 (CR)	Tatyana Grebenchuk; Soviet Union	1:59.53	Ellen Kiessling; East Germany	1:59.68
1500 metres	Doina Melinte; Romania	4:04.79 (CR)	Svetlana Kitova; Soviet Union	4:05.71	Yvonne Mai; East Germany	4:06.09
3000 metres	Elly van Hulst; Netherlands	8:33.82 (WR)	Liz McColgan; Great Britain	8:34.80	Margareta Keszeg; Romania	8:48.70
60 metres hurdles	Yelizaveta Chernyshova; Soviet Union	7.82 (CR)	Lyudmila Narozhilenko; Soviet Union	7.83	Cornelia Oschkenat; East Germany	7.86
3000 metres walk	Kerry Saxby; Australia	12:01.65 (CR)	Beate Anders; East Germany	12:07.73	Ileana Salvador; Italy	12:11.33
High jump	Stefka Kostadinova; Bulgaria	2.02	Tamara Bykova; Soviet Union	2.02	Heike Redetzky; West Germany	1.94
Long jump	Galina Chistyakova; Soviet Union	6.98	Marieta Ilcu; Romania	6.86	Larisa Berezhnaya; Soviet Union	6.82
Shot put	Claudia Losch; West Germany	20.45	Huang Zhihong; China	20.25	Christa Wiese; East Germany	19.75

== Medal table ==
Rank	Nation	Gold	Silver	Bronze	Total
1	Soviet Union (URS)	4	5	4	13
2	United States (USA)	4	3	4	11
3	East Germany (GDR)	2	2	4	8
4	West Germany (FRG)	2	2	2	6
5	Cuba (CUB)	2	1	1	4
6	Netherlands (NED)	2	0	0	2
7	Great Britain (GBR)	1	3	0	4
8	Jamaica (JAM)	1	1	1	3
8	Romania (ROU)	1	1	1	3
10	Australia (AUS)	1	0	0	1
10	Bulgaria (BUL)	1	0	0	1
10	Ireland (IRL)	1	0	0	1
10	Kenya (KEN)	1	0	0	1
10	Morocco (MAR)	1	0	0	1
15	Spain (ESP)	0	1	1	2
16	Brazil (BRA)	0	1	0	1
16	China (CHN)	0	1	0	1
16	Czechoslovakia (TCH)	0	1	0	1
16	Ghana (GHA)	0	1	0	1
16	Trinidad and Tobago (TRI)	0	1	0	1
21	Italy (ITA)	0	0	3	3
22	Canada (CAN)	0	0	1	1
22	Norway (NOR)	0	0	1	1
22	Sweden (SWE)	0	0	1	1
Totals (24 entries)		24	24	24	72

== Participating nations ==
- Algeria (1)
- Anguilla (1)
- Argentina (1)
- Australia (7)
- Austria (6)
- Bahamas (4)
- Belgium (4)
- Bermuda (2)
- Bolivia (1)
- Botswana (2)
- Brazil (8)
- Bulgaria (9)
- Cameroon (1)
- Canada (12)
- Chile (2)
- China (4)
- Chinese Taipei (1)
- Cuba (14)
- Cyprus (1)
- Czechoslovakia (9)
- East Germany (10)
- Egypt (2)
- Ethiopia (3)
- Finland (9)
- France (14)
- Ghana (3)
- Great Britain (17)
- Greece (4)
- Hungary (25)
- Iceland (1)
- Iran (1)
- Ireland (4)
- Israel (2)
- Italy (11)
- Ivory Coast (1)
- Jamaica (6)
- Japan (5)
- Kenya (1)
- Madagascar (2)
- Mexico (4)
- Morocco (5)
- Netherlands (8)
- Norway (2)
- Philippines (2)
- Poland (9)
- Portugal (3)
- Romania (10)
- San Marino (2)
- South Korea (2)
- Soviet Union (28)
- Spain (14)
- Sweden (3)
- Switzerland (2)
- Trinidad and Tobago (2)
- Turkey (2)
- United States (36)
- Uruguay (1)
- Venezuela (1)
- West Germany (21)
- Yugoslavia (3)
- Zambia (2)

== See also ==
- 1989 in athletics (track and field)
