= 1987 World Championships in Athletics – Men's 800 metres =

These are the official results of the Men's 800 metres event at the 1987 IAAF World Championships in Rome, Italy. There were a total number of 45 participating athletes, with six qualifying heats, four quarter-finals, two semi-finals and the final held on Tuesday September 1, 1987.

In the final José Luíz Barbosa took the lead from the break, chased primarily by Billy Konchellah and Faouzi Lahbi up to a 50.59 400 metres. Peter Elliott stayed on the rail slightly off the lead through the first lap joined by Stephen Ole Marai on the outside and Tom McKean boxed on the inside. Through the penultimate turn, these three tried to move forward, Elliott moving outside to the shoulders of the lead pack, followed by Mara and McKean, but McKean was held inside. By the time they reached the backstretch, McKean tried again to run around Marai, this time he tripped over Marai, injuring himself, eventually falling out the back of the field. Konchellah caught Barbosa at the end of the straightaway and went into the lead. Elliott tried to follow, but Barbosa held him off through the turn. By the end of the turn, the three medalists had separated from the rest of the field, Lahbi the last to hold on. As Konchellah sprinted away to victory, Barbosa and Elliott both started sprinting for home in chase. Barbosa came off the turn a bit wide, leaving room for Elliott to slowly edge his way along the rail and ahead of Barbosa to take the silver.

== Medalists ==
Gold	Billy Konchellah; Kenya (KEN)
Silver	(United Kingdom) Peter Elliott; Great Britain (GBR)
Bronze	José Luíz Barbosa; Brazil (BRA)

== Final ==
RANK	FINAL	TIME
	Billy Konchellah (KEN)	1:43.06 CR
	Peter Elliott (GBR)	1:43.41
	José Luíz Barbosa (BRA)	1:43.76
4.	Ryszard Ostrowski (POL)	1:44.59
5.	Faouzi Lahbi (MAR)	1:44.83
6.	Stephen Ole Marai (KEN)	1:44.84
7.	Slobodan Popović (YUG)	1:45.07
8.	Tom McKean (GBR)	1:49.21

== Semi-finals ==
- Held on Monday 1987-08-31

RANK	HEAT 1	TIME
1.	Tom McKean (GBR)	1:44.86
2.	José Luíz Barbosa (BRA)	1:45.03
3.	Stephen Ole Marai (KEN)	1:45.09
4.	Faouzi Lahbi (MAR)	1:45.19
5.	Slobodan Popović (YUG)	1:45.33
6.	Vladimir Graudyn (URS)	1:45.36
7.	Moussa Fall (SEN)	1:47.55
8.	Philippe Collard (FRA)	1:48.24

RANK	HEAT 2	TIME
1.	Billy Konchellah (KEN)	1:46.11
2.	Ryszard Ostrowski (POL)	1:46.22
3.	Peter Elliott (GBR)	1:46.23
4.	Babacar Niang (SEN)	1:46.23
5.	Dieudonné Kwizera (BDI)	1:46.26
6.	David Mack (USA)	1:48.49
7.	Ari Suhonen (FIN)	1:48.85
8.	Alvaro Silva (POR)	1:49.41

== Quarter-finals ==
- Held on Sunday 1987-08-30

RANK	HEAT 1	TIME
1.	Stephen Ole Marai (KEN)	1:45.97
2.	Ryszard Ostrowski (POL)	1:46.04
3.	Faouzi Lahbi (MAR)	1:46.12
4.	Stanley Redwine (USA)	1:46.25
5.	William Wuycke (VEN)	1:46.38
6.	Robin van Helden (NED)	1:46.69
7.	Luis Karin Toledo (MEX)	1:46.88
8.	Reda Abdenouz (ALG)	1:48.96
—	Getahun Ayana (ETH)	DNS

RANK	HEAT 2	TIME
1.	Moussa Fall (SEN)	1:44.74
2.	Peter Elliott (GBR)	1:44.98
3.	Dieudonné Kwizera (BDI)	1:45.06
4.	Slobodan Popović (YUG)	1:45.15
5.	Vladimir Graudyn (URS)	1:45.19
6.	Alvaro Silva (POR)	1:45.63
7.	David Mack (USA)	1:45.68
8.	Edwin Koech (KEN)	1:46.36

RANK	HEAT 3	TIME
1.	Billy Konchellah (KEN)	1:45.53
2.	Philippe Collard (FRA)	1:45.89
3.	Tom McKean (GBR)	1:46.11
4.	Andrey Sudnik (URS)	1:46.48
5.	Ibrahim Okash (SOM)	1:47.00
6.	Ismael Youssef (QAT)	1:49.26
—	Gert Kilbert (SUI)	DNF
—	Pablo Squella (CHI)	DNS

RANK	HEAT 4	TIME
1.	Babacar Niang (SEN)	1:45.81
2.	José Luíz Barbosa (BRA)	1:46.07
3.	Ari Suhonen (FIN)	1:46.18
4.	Tony Morrell (GBR)	1:46.25
5.	Peter Braun (FRG)	1:48.53
6.	Luc Bernaert (BEL)	1:49.06
7.	Martin Enholm (SWE)	1:49.17
8.	Johnny Gray (USA)	1:49.50

== Qualifying heats ==
- Held on Saturday 1987-08-29

RANK	HEAT 1	TIME
1.	Faouzi Lahbi (MAR)	1:46.07
2.	Dieudonne Kwizera (BUR)	1:46.27
3.	Andrey Sudnik (URS)	1:46.29
4.	José Luíz Barbosa (BRA)	1:46.31
5.	Ibrahim Okash (SOM)	1:46.61
6.	Chern Srichudanu (THA)	1:50.37
7.	Rob Druppers (NED)	1:50.58
8.	Semi Vuetibau (FIJ)	1:58.58

RANK	HEAT 2	TIME
1.	Johnny Gray (USA)	1:46.53
2.	Peter Elliott (GBR)	1:46.63
3.	Stephen Ole Marai (KEN)	1:46.91
4.	Robin van Helden (NED)	1:46.98
5.	Luc Bernaert (BEL)	1:47.47
6.	Pablo Squella (CHI)	1:47.48
7.	Manlio Molinari (SMR)	1:53.41

RANK	HEAT 3	TIME
1.	Billy Konchellah (KEN)	1:47.98
2.	Moussa Fall (SEN)	1:48.01
3.	Ryszard Ostrowski (POL)	1:48.07
4.	Álvaro Silva (POR)	1:48.19
5.	Gert Kilbert (SUI)	1:48.48
6.	Luis Migueles (ARG)	1:49.52
–	Agberto Guimarães (BRA)	DNS
–	Mohamed Hossain Milzer (BAN)	DNS

RANK	HEAT 4	TIME
1.	Philippe Collard (FRA)	1:47.44
2.	Stanley Redwine (USA)	1:47.64
3.	Tom McKean (GBR)	1:47.71
4.	Ari Suhonen (FIN)	1:47.81
5.	Luis Karin Toledo (MEX)	1:48.05
6.	Ismael Youssef (QAT)	1:48.73
7.	John Chappory (GIB)	1:54.32

RANK	HEAT 5	TIME
1.	Peter Braun (FRG)	1:47.96
2.	Tony Morrell (GBR)	1:48.18
3.	Martin Enholm (SWE)	1:48.63
4.	David Mack (USA)	1:49.47
5.	Augustin Ntamihanga (RWA)	1:50.69
6.	Simon Hoogewerf (CAN)	1:51.13
–	Joaquim Cruz (BRA)	DNS

RANK	HEAT 6	TIME
1.	Slobodan Popović (YUG)	1:47.42
2.	Babacar Niang (SEN)	1:47.46
3.	Edwin Koech (KEN)	1:47.56
4.	William Wuyke (VEN)	1:47.59
5.	Vladimir Graudyn (URS)	1:47.75
6.	Getahun Ayana (ETH)	1:49.22
7.	Reda Abdenouz (ALG)	1:49.22
–	Syed Meesaq Rizvi (PAK)	DNS

== See also ==
- 1983 Men's World Championships 800 metres (Helsinki)
- 1984 Men's Olympic 800 metres (Los Angeles)
- 1986 Men's European Championships 800 metres (Stuttgart)
- 1988 Men's Olympic 800 metres (Seoul)
- 1990 Men's European Championships 800 metres (Split)
- 1991 Men's World Championships 800 metres (Tokyo)
