= Athletics at the 1983 Summer Universiade – Men's 800 metres =

The men's 800 metres event at the 1983 Summer Universiade was held at the Commonwealth Stadium in Edmonton, Canada, on 8, 10 and 11 July 1983.

== Medalists ==
Gold	Silver	Bronze
Ryszard Ostrowski; Poland	Graham Williamson; Great Britain	Mohamed Alouini; Tunisia

== Results ==
=== Heats ===
Rank	Heat	Athlete	Nationality	Time	Notes
1	5	Chris McGeorge	Great Britain	1:48.17	Q
2	5	Konstantin Russkikh	Soviet Union	1:48.32	Q
3	5	André Lavie	France	1:48.48	Q
4	5	Takatsune Teranishi	Japan	1:48.73	q
5	3	James Mays	United States	1:49.06	Q
6	3	Mohamed Alouini	Tunisia	1:49.12	Q
7	4	Graham Williamson	Great Britain	1:49.14	Q
8	4	Babacar Niang	Senegal	1:49.25	Q
9	4	Stefano Cecchini	Italy	1:49.39	Q
10	1	Viktor Kalinkin	Soviet Union	1:49.42	Q
11	4	Andres Garcia	France	1:49.45	
12	3	Petru Drăgoescu	Romania	1:49.57	Q
13	3	Riccardo Materazzi	Italy	1:49.58	
14	3	Simon Hoogewerf	Canada	1:49.93	
15	4	Steven Burgess	Bermuda	1:50.24	
16	2	Mark Handelsman	Israel	1:50.62	Q
17	5	Kim Bok-joo	South Korea	1:50.70	
18	2	Ryszard Ostrowski	Poland	1:50.73	Q
19	2	Ulrich Karck	West Germany	1:50.95	Q
20	1	Stanley Redwine	United States	1:51.11	Q
21	2	Paul Gilbert	Australia	1:51.24	
22	1	Moussa Fall	Senegal	1:51.75	Q
23	1	Jama Aden	Somalia	1:52.20	
24	2	Ghislain Obounga	Congo	1:52.88	
25	1	Christian Cifuentes	Chile	1:53.05	
26	2	Balbr Singh Basra	India	1:53.15	
27	3	Fernando Fonseca	Angola	1:54.20	
28	1	Alberto López	Guatemala	1:55.18	
29	4	Andrew Boyd	Jamaica	1:55.18	
30	5	Héctor Juarez	Guatemala	1:58.56	
31	3	Gideon Mthembu	Swaziland	2:01.70	

=== Semifinals ===
Rank	Heat	Athlete	Nationality	Time	Notes
1	1	Viktor Kalinkin	Soviet Union	1:47.78	Q
2	1	Mark Handelsman	Israel	1:48.08	Q
3	1	James Mays	United States	1:48.09	Q
4	1	Ryszard Ostrowski	Poland	1:48.16	q
5	2	Stanley Redwine	United States	1:48.26	Q
6	1	Chris McGeorge	Great Britain	1:48.29	q
6	2	Graham Williamson	Great Britain	1:48.29	Q
8	2	Mohamed Alouini	Tunisia	1:48.89	Q
9	1	Babacar Niang	Senegal	1:49.05	
10	2	Ulrich Karck	West Germany	1:49.22	
11	1	Takatsune Teranishi	Japan	1:50.05	
12	2	Konstantin Russkikh	Soviet Union	1:50.31	
13	2	André Lavie	France	1:50.94	
14	2	Stefano Cecchini	Italy	1:51.92	
15	1	Moussa Fall	Senegal	1:54.76	
	2	Petru Drăgoescu	Romania	?:??.??	

=== Final ===
Rank	Athlete	Nationality	Time	Notes
1st place, gold medalist(s)	Ryszard Ostrowski	Poland	1:46.29	
2nd place, silver medalist(s)	Graham Williamson	Great Britain	1:46.66	
3rd place, bronze medalist(s)	Mohamed Alouini	Tunisia	1:46.75	
4	James Mays	United States	1:46.76	
5	Mark Handelsman	Israel	1:46.87	
6	Chris McGeorge	Great Britain	1:48.13	
7	Viktor Kalinkin	Soviet Union	1:49.07	
8	Stanley Redwine	United States	1:50.98	
