= 1987 IAAF World Indoor Championships – Men's 800 metres =

The men's 800 metres event at the 1987 IAAF World Indoor Championships was held at the Hoosier Dome in Indianapolis on 6 and 8 March.

== Medalists ==
| silver | Silver | Bronze |
|---|---|---|
| José Luíz Barbosa; Brazil | Vladimir Graudyn; Soviet Union | Faouzi Lahbi; Morocco |

== Results ==
=== Heats ===
The first 2 of each heat (Q) and next 2 fastest (q) qualified for the final.

| Rank | Heat | Name | Nationality | Time | Notes |
|---|---|---|---|---|---|
| 1 | 3 | Stanley Redwine | United States | 1:49.11 | Q |
| 2 | 3 | Faouzi Lahbi | Morocco | 1:49.13 | Q |
| 2 | 3 | Vladimir Graudyn | Soviet Union | 1:49.34 | q |
| 4 | 2 | Rob Druppers | Netherlands | 1:49.61 | Q |
| 5 | 3 | Slobodan Popović | Yugoslavia | 1:49.94 | q |
| 6 | 2 | José Luíz Barbosa | Brazil | 1:50.01 | Q |
| 7 | 2 | Ray Brown | United States | 1:50.13 | |
| 8 | 2 | Mohamad Saïd | Morocco | 1:50.38 | |
| 9 | 2 | Tony Morrell | Great Britain | 1:50.39 | |
| 10 | 1 | Babacar Niang | Senegal | 1:50.71 | Q |
| 11 | 1 | Dieudonné Kwizera | Burundi | 1:50.74 | Q |
| 12 | 3 | Mauricio Hernández | Mexico | 1:50.85 | NR |
| 13 | 2 | Martin Enholm | Sweden | 1:50.91 | |
| 14 | 3 | Luis Migueles | Argentina | 1:51.03 | |
| 15 | 1 | Gert Kilbert | Switzerland | 1:51.13 | |
| 16 | 1 | Tapfumaneyi Jonga | Zimbabwe | 1:51.27 | NR |
| 17 | 3 | Joseph Chesire | Kenya | 1:51.34 | |
| 18 | 1 | Pablo Squella | Chile | 1:51.57 | |
| 19 | 2 | Dale Jones | Antigua and Barbuda | 1:54.56 | NR |
| 20 | 3 | Najim Al-Sowailem | Kuwait | 1:54.72 | NR |
| 21 | 1 | Edwin Koech | Kenya | 1:54.94 | |
| 22 | 1 | Alberto López | Guatemala | 1:56.75 | NR |
| 23 | 2 | Porfirio Méndez | Paraguay | 1:56.87 | NR |
| 24 | 3 | Ian Morris | Trinidad and Tobago | 2:03.82 | |
| | 1 | Agberto Guimarães | Brazil | DNS | |

=== Final ===
| Rank | Name | Nationality | Time | Notes |
|---|---|---|---|---|
| 1st place, gold medalist(s) | José Luíz Barbosa | Brazil | 1:47.49 | AR |
| 2nd place, silver medalist(s) | Vladimir Graudyn | Soviet Union | 1:47.68 | |
| 3rd place, bronze medalist(s) | Faouzi Lahbi | Morocco | 1:47.79 | |
| 4 | Stanley Redwine | United States | 1:47.81 | |
| 5 | Dieudonné Kwizera | Burundi | 1:47.87 | NR |
| 6 | Slobodan Popović | Yugoslavia | 1:48.07 | |
| 7 | Babacar Niang | Senegal | 1:48.33 | NR |
| 8 | Rob Druppers | Netherlands | 1:48.89 | |
