= 1987 European Athletics Indoor Championships – Men's 800 metres =

The men's 800 metres event at the 1987 European Athletics Indoor Championships was held on 21 and 22 February.

== Medalists ==
Gold	Silver	Bronze
Rob Druppers; Netherlands	Vladimir Graudyn; Soviet Union	Ari Suhonen; Finland

== Results ==
=== Heats ===
First 3 from each heat (Q) and the next 3 fastest (q) qualified for the semifinals.

Rank	Heat	Name	Nationality	Time	Notes
1	1	Ari Suhonen	Finland	1:48.93	Q
2	1	Tony Morrell	Great Britain	1:48.95	Q
3	1	Rob Druppers	Netherlands	1:49.25	Q
4	1	Axel Harries	West Germany	1:49.80	q
5	3	Vladimir Graudyn	Soviet Union	1:50.21	Q
6	3	Anatoliy Millin	Soviet Union	1:50.26	Q
7	3	Marc Corstjens	Belgium	1:50.42	Q
8	3	Didier Le Guillou	France	1:50.43	q
9	3	Martin Enholm	Sweden	1:50.67	q
10	1	Alex Geissbühler	Switzerland	1:50.83	
11	1	Gérard Philippe	France	1:51.17	
12	3	Stefano Cecchini	Italy	1:52.15	
13	2	Jaap van Treijen	Netherlands	1:52.36	Q
14	2	Colomán Trabado	Spain	1:52.43	Q
15	2	Gert Kilbert	Switzerland	1:52.44	Q
16	2	Slobodan Popović	Yugoslavia	1:52.51	
17	2	Tonino Viali	Italy	1:52.72	
18	2	Ronny Olsson	Sweden	1:54.16	

=== Semifinals ===
First 3 from each semifinal (Q) and the next 2 fastest (q) qualified for the final.

Rank	Heat	Name	Nationality	Time	Notes
1	2	Rob Druppers	Netherlands	1:49.59	Q
2	1	Vladimir Graudyn	Soviet Union	1:49.88	Q
3	2	Colomán Trabado	Spain	1:49.89	Q
4	2	Gert Kilbert	Switzerland	1:49.97	Q
5	1	Ari Suhonen	Finland	1:50.01	Q
6	2	Tony Morrell	Great Britain	1:50.02	q
7	1	Jaap van Treijen	Netherlands	1:50.17	Q
8	2	Anatoliy Millin	Soviet Union	1:50.24	q
9	1	Didier Le Guillou	France	1:50.70	
10	2	Marc Corstjens	Belgium	1:50.87	
11	1	Martin Enholm	Sweden	1:51.03	
12	1	Axel Harries	West Germany	1:53.12	

=== Final ===
Rank	Name	Nationality	Time	Notes
1st place, gold medalist(s)	Rob Druppers	Netherlands	1:48.12	
2nd place, silver medalist(s)	Vladimir Graudyn	Soviet Union	1:49.14	
3rd place, bronze medalist(s)	Ari Suhonen	Finland	1:49.56	
4	Anatoliy Millin	Soviet Union	1:50.24	
5	Jaap van Treijen	Netherlands	1:51.03	
6	Tony Morrell	Great Britain	1:58.31	
7	Gert Kilbert	Switzerland	1:59.08	
8	Colomán Trabado	Spain	2:14.16	
