= 1986 European Athletics Championships – Men's 800 metres =

Men's 800 metres at the European Athletics Championships

These are the official results of the Men's 800 metres event at the 1986 European Championships in Stuttgart, West Germany, held at Neckarstadion on 26, 27, and 28 August 1986.

== Medalists ==
Gold	Sebastian Coe; United Kingdom
Silver	Tom McKean; United Kingdom
Bronze	Steve Cram; United Kingdom

== Results ==
=== Final ===
28 August

Rank	Name	Nationality	Time	Notes
1st place, gold medalist(s)	Sebastian Coe	United Kingdom	1:44.50	
2nd place, silver medalist(s)	Tom McKean	United Kingdom	1:44.61	
3rd place, bronze medalist(s)	Steve Cram	United Kingdom	1:44.88	
4	Rob Druppers	Netherlands	1:45.53	
5	Ryszard Ostrowski	Poland	1:45.54	
6	Peter Braun	West Germany	1:45.83	
7	Philippe Collard	France	1:45.96	
8	Viktor Kalinkin	Soviet Union	1:47.36	

=== Semi-finals ===
27 August

==== Semi-final 1 ====
Rank	Name	Nationality	Time	Notes
1	Steve Cram	United Kingdom	1:46.59	Q
2	Peter Braun	West Germany	1:46.84	Q
3	Ryszard Ostrowski	Poland	1:46.89	Q
4	Philippe Collard	France	1:46.96	Q
5	Vladimir Graudyn	Soviet Union	1:47.50	
6	Álvaro Silva	Portugal	1:47.69	
7	Valeriy Starodubtsev	Soviet Union	1:48.37	
8	Ari Suhonen	Finland	1:49.67	

==== Semi-final 2 ====
Rank	Name	Nationality	Time	Notes
1	Rob Druppers	Netherlands	1:46.54	Q
2	Tom McKean	United Kingdom	1:46.62	Q
3	Sebastian Coe	United Kingdom	1:47.10	Q
4	Viktor Kalinkin	Soviet Union	1:47.41	Q
5	Matthias Assmann	West Germany	1:47.45	
6	Martin Enholm	Sweden	1:49.02	
7	Hans-Joachim Mogalle	East Germany	1:49.90	
	Thomas Giessing	West Germany	DNF	

=== Heats ===
26 August

==== Heat 1 ====
Rank	Name	Nationality	Time	Notes
1	Peter Braun	West Germany	1:48.38	Q
2	Ryszard Ostrowski	Poland	1:48.39	Q
3	Rob Druppers	Netherlands	1:48.42	Q
4	Vladimir Graudyn	Soviet Union	1:48.49	q
5	Slobodan Popović	Yugoslavia	1:48.68	
6	Gert Kilbert	Switzerland	1:49.82	
7	Spyros Spyrou	Cyprus	1:53.36	

==== Heat 2 ====
Rank	Name	Nationality	Time	Notes
1	Tom McKean	United Kingdom	1:48.37	Q
2	Valeriy Starodubtsev	Soviet Union	1:48.46	Q
3	Matthias Assmann	West Germany	1:48.65	Q
4	Ronny Olsson	Sweden	1:48.78	
5	Robin van Helden	Netherlands	1:48.88	
6	Colomán Trabado	Spain	1:49.42	
7	Mücteba Apaydın	Turkey	1:52.41	

==== Heat 3 ====
Rank	Name	Nationality	Time	Notes
1	Steve Cram	United Kingdom	1:46.54	Q
2	Viktor Kalinkin	Soviet Union	1:46.68	Q
3	Álvaro Silva	Portugal	1:46.74	NR Q
4	Hans-Joachim Mogalle	East Germany	1:46.98	q
5	Martin Enholm	Sweden	1:48.40	q
6	Bo Breigan	Norway	1:49.78	

==== Heat 4 ====
Rank	Name	Nationality	Time	Notes
1	Sebastian Coe	United Kingdom	1:47.64	Q
2	Ari Suhonen	Finland	1:47.71	Q
3	Philippe Collard	France	1:47.72	Q
4	Thomas Giessing	West Germany	1:48.03	q
5	Alberto Barsotti	Italy	1:48.53	
6	Marc Corstjens	Belgium	1:48.55	
7	John Chappory	Gibraltar	1:57.45	

== Participation ==
According to an unofficial count, 27 athletes from 19 countries participated in the event.

- Belgium (1)
- Cyprus (1)
- East Germany (1)
- Finland (1)
- France (1)
- Gibraltar (1)
- Italy (1)
- Netherlands (2)
- Norway (1)
- Poland (1)
- Portugal (1)
- Soviet Union (3)
- Spain (1)
- Sweden (2)
- Switzerland (1)
- Turkey (1)
- United Kingdom (3)
- West Germany (3)
- Yugoslavia (1)

== See also ==
- 1984 Men's Olympic 800 metres (Los Angeles)
- 1987 Men's World Championships 800 metres (Rome)
- 1988 Men's Olympic 800 metres (Seoul)
