= 1986 European Athletics Indoor Championships – Men's 800 metres =

The men's 800 metres event at the 1986 European Athletics Indoor Championships was held on 22 and 23 February.

== Medalists ==
Gold	Silver	Bronze
Peter Braun; West Germany	Colomán Trabado; Spain	Thierry Tonnelier; France

== Results ==
=== Heats ===
First 2 of each heat (Q) and the next 4 fastest (q) qualified for the semifinals.

Rank	Heat	Name	Nationality	Time	Notes
1	2	Axel Harries	West Germany	1:51.99	Q
2	3	Thierry Tonnelier	France	1:52.08	Q
3	2	André Lavie	France	1:52.12	Q
4	2	Sergey Kutsebo	Soviet Union	1:52.23	q
5	3	Jussi Udelhoven	West Germany	1:52.34	Q
6	2	Ari Suhonen	Finland	1:52.40	q
7	3	Martin Enholm	Sweden	1:52.76	q
8	4	Colomán Trabado	Spain	1:52.78	Q
9	3	Herwig Tavernaro	Austria	1:52.91	q
10	3	Mário Silva	Portugal	1:52.91	
11	4	Philippe Collard	France	1:53.25	Q
12	1	Peter Braun	West Germany	1:53.58	Q
13	4	Ronny Olsson	Sweden	1:53.59	
14	1	Sotirios Moutsanas	Greece	1:53.68	Q
15	1	Javier Nieto	Spain	1:53.79	
16	1	David Sharpe	Great Britain	1:53.93	
17	4	Peter Svaricek	Austria	1:53.98	
18	4	Serafim Pallikaris	Greece	1:55.29	
19	2	Avelino Baldachino	Gibraltar	2:00.28	NR

=== Semifinals ===
First 3 from each semifinal qualified directly (Q) for the final.

Rank	Heat	Name	Nationality	Time	Notes
1	1	Jussi Udelhoven	West Germany	1:50.03	Q
2	2	Peter Braun	West Germany	1:50.34	Q
3	1	Colomán Trabado	Spain	1:50.54	Q
4	2	Philippe Collard	France	1:50.58	Q
5	2	Axel Harries	West Germany	1:50.81	Q
6	1	Thierry Tonnelier	France	1:50.95	Q
7	1	Sergey Kutsebo	Soviet Union	1:51.21	
8	1	Sotirios Moutsanas	Greece	1:51.26	
9	2	Martin Enholm	Sweden	1:51.76	
10	2	André Lavie	France	1:54.16	
11	2	Ari Suhonen	Finland	1:54.23	
12	1	Herwig Tavernaro	Austria	1:54.88	

=== Final ===
Rank	Name	Nationality	Time	Notes
1st place, gold medalist(s)	Peter Braun	West Germany	1:48.96	
2nd place, silver medalist(s)	Colomán Trabado	Spain	1:49.12	
3rd place, bronze medalist(s)	Thierry Tonnelier	France	1:49.51	
4	Philippe Collard	France	1:49.79	
5	Axel Harries	West Germany	1:50.04	
6	Jussi Udelhoven	West Germany	1:53.78	
