= 1985 European Athletics Indoor Championships – Men's 800 metres =

The men's 800 metres event at the 1985 European Athletics Indoor Championships was held on 2 and 3 March.

== Medalists ==
Gold	Silver	Bronze
Rob Harrison; Great Britain	Petru Drăgoescu; Romania	Leonid Masunov; Soviet Union

== Results ==
=== Heats ===
First 2 from each heat (Q) and the next 6 fastest (q) qualified for the semifinals.

Rank	Heat	Name	Nationality	Time	Notes
1	3	Benjamín González	Spain	1:48.68	Q
2	2	Viktor Kalinkin	Soviet Union	1:48.69	Q
3	3	Slobodan Popović	Yugoslavia	1:48.77	Q
4	2	Colomán Trabado	Spain	1:49.00	Q
4	3	Leonid Masunov	Soviet Union	1:49.00	q
6	3	Marco Mayr	Switzerland	1:49.09	q
7	1	Axel Harries	West Germany	1:49.12	Q
8	1	Petru Drăgoescu	Romania	1:49.20	Q
9	2	Thierry Tonnelier	France	1:49.30	q
10	1	Rob Harrison	Great Britain	1:49.36	q
11	3	Herwig Tavernaro	Austria	1:49.66	q
12	2	Christoph Ulmer	Switzerland	1:49.77	q
13	2	Alberto Barsotti	Italy	1:49.99	
14	1	Antonio Páez	Spain	1:50.44	
15	1	Philippos Stylianoudis	Cyprus	1:50.48	
16	3	Peter Braun	West Germany	1:50.50	
17	2	Thomas Wilking	West Germany	1:50.71	
18	1	Boyko Trayanov	Bulgaria	1:52.62	

=== Semifinals ===
First 3 from each semifinal qualified directly (Q) for the final.

Rank	Heat	Name	Nationality	Time	Notes
1	1	Petru Drăgoescu	Romania	1:47.21	Q, NR
2	1	Leonid Masunov	Soviet Union	1:47.52	Q
3	1	Benjamín González	Spain	1:47.55	Q
4	2	Rob Harrison	Great Britain	1:47.72	Q, PB
5	2	Axel Harries	West Germany	1:47.84	Q
6	2	Viktor Kalinkin	Soviet Union	1:48.38	Q
7	1	Marco Mayr	Switzerland	1:48.50	
8	2	Colomán Trabado	Spain	1:49.08	
9	1	Thierry Tonnelier	France	1:50.13	
10	2	Slobodan Popović	Yugoslavia	1:51.35	
11	1	Herwig Tavernaro	Austria	1:53.61	
	2	Christoph Ulmer	Switzerland	DNF	

=== Final ===
Rank	Name	Nationality	Time	Notes
1st place, gold medalist(s)	Rob Harrison	Great Britain	1:49.09	
2nd place, silver medalist(s)	Petru Drăgoescu	Romania	1:49.38	
3rd place, bronze medalist(s)	Leonid Masunov	Soviet Union	1:49.59	
4	Viktor Kalinkin	Soviet Union	1:49.92	
5	Axel Harries	West Germany	1:50.00	
6	Benjamín González	Spain	1:50.05	
