= Athletics at the 1988 Summer Olympics – Men's 800 metres =

Men's 800 metres at the Games of the XXIV Olympiad
- Venue: Olympic Stadium
- Dates: 23 September 1988 (heats); 24 September 1988 (quarterfinals); 25 September 1888 (semifinals); 26 September 1988 (final)
- Competitors: 70 from 53 nations
- Winning time: 1:43.55

Medalists
1st place, gold medalist(s)		Paul Ereng; Kenya
2nd place, silver medalist(s)		Joaquim Cruz; Brazil
3rd place, bronze medalist(s)		Saïd Aouita; Morocco

The men's 800 metres at the 1988 Summer Olympics in Seoul, South Korea had an entry list of 70 competitors from 53 nations, with nine qualifying heats (70), four second-round races (32) and two semifinals (16), before the final (8) took off on Monday September 26, 1988. The maximum number of athletes per nation had been set at 3 since the 1930 Olympic Congress. The event was won by 0.35 seconds by Paul Ereng of Kenya, the first time a Kenyan runner had won the 800 metres; the nation had previously taken silver in 1968 and bronze in 1964 and 1972. Joaquim Cruz of Brazil did not defend his 1984 gold, finishing second; the silver medal made him the ninth man to win two medals in the event. Saïd Aouita took bronze, Morocco's first medal in the men's 800 metres.

== Summary ==
The final started out as a battle for the pole as José Luíz Barbosa and his teammate Joaquim Cruz led through the first turn, with Nixon Kiprotich in close pursuit. Barbosa was the first across the break line but Kiprotich ran hard down the backstretch to demand the lead. At the beginning of the second turn, Cruz tried to get around Barbosa. He was successful for a moment, the Barbosa accelerated and moved onto challenging position on Kiprotich's shoulder. Coming off the second turn, Barbosa put a finishing move on Kiprotich, but it was only the first lap, Barbosa getting the bell at a fast 49.54. Johnny Gray, known for this kind of destructive first lap was back in a more conservative fifth place, just behind Peter Elliott. Through the third turn, Saïd Aouita came forward from lagging at the back to move into challenging position behind Elliott. Paul Ereng followed Aouita from the back. His head bobbing, Kiprotich strained past Barbosa down the backstretch, but Cruz and Elliott were right with him, the defending champion Cruz continuing and edging ahead in the middle of the final turn. Kiprotich faded while Elliott and Aouita were challenging on Cruz's shoulder. Weaving his way around Barbosa and then Kiprotich, Ereng moved behind Elliott. Coming off the turn, Cruz accelerated, opening a 2-metre gap on his three pursuers, but his departure left a gap between Elliott and the curb, which Ereng gladly raced through. With more speed than the others, Ereng drifted to the outside, passing a helpless Cruz, who could only turn and look at who was passing him. Ereng ran away for gold while Cruz struggled. Further to the outside, Aouita took a run at Elliott, but ran into his elbow. Deterred for a moment, Aouita took a second run at Elliott, edging ahead for bronze, but too far back to catch Cruz for silver.

== Background ==
This was the 21st appearance of the event, which is one of 12 athletics events to have been held at every Summer Olympics. Three finalists from 1984, including the champion, returned: gold medalist Joaquim Cruz of Brazil, fifth-place finisher Donato Sabia of Italy, and seventh-place finisher Johnny Gray of the United States. Saïd Aouita of Morocco was the favorite.

Thirteen nations had never had a competitor in the men's 800 metres before: Andora, Angola, Bangladesh, Bermuda, the People's Republic of China, Chinese Taipei, the Cook Islands, Cyprus, Fiji, Papua New Guinea, Qater, Saint Vincent and the Grenadines, and Zaire all appeared in the event for the first time. Great Britain made its 20th appearance, most among all nations, having had no competitors in the event only in the 1904 Games in St. Louis.

== Competition format ==
The 1988 edition of the men's 800 metres was run over four rounds, a format that appeared only in 1960 before returning in 1984. The "fastest loser" system introduced in 1964 was used for the first round. There were nine first-round heats, each with 7 or 8 athletes; the top three runners in each heat as well as the next five fastest overall advanced to the semifinals. There were four quarterfinals, each of 8 athletes; the top four runners in each advanced to the semifinals. There were two semifinals with 8 athletes each; the top four runners in each semifinal advanced to the eight-man final.

== Records ==
Prior to the competition, the existing World and Olympic records were as follows.

World record	Sebastian Coe (GBR)	1:41.73	Florence, Italy	10 June 1981
Olympic record	Joaquim Cruz (BRA)	1:43.00	Los Angeles, United States	6 August 1984

No world or Olympic records were set during the competition.

== Schedule ==
All times are Korea Standard Time adjusted for daylight savings (UTC+10)

Date	Time	Round
Friday, 23 September 1988	14:00	Round 1
Saturday, 24 September 1988	15:10	Quarterfinals
Sunday, 25 September 1988	14:50	Semifinals
Monday, 26 September 1988	13:40	Final

== Results ==
=== Round 1 ===
The first round was held on Friday, 23 September 1988.

==== Heat 1 ====
Rank	Athlete	Nation	Time	Notes
1	Faouzi Lahbi	Morocco	1:47.82	Q
2	Nixon Kiprotich	Kenya	1:48.68	Q
3	Ryszard Ostrowski	Poland	1:49.04	Q
4	Moussa Fall	Senegal	1:49.14	
5	Spyros Spyrou	Cyprus	1:49.84	
6	Porfirio Méndez	Paraguay	1:50.72	
7	Mansour Al-Baloushi	Oman	1:51.03	
8	Yussuf Moli Yesky	Chad	1:57.97	

==== Heat 2 ====
Rank	Athlete	Nation	Time	Notes
1	Babacar Niang	Senegal	1:47.65	Q
2	Steve Cram	Great Britain	1:47.77	Q
3	Donato Sabia	Italy	1:47.84	Q
4	Mohamed Ismail Youssef	Qatar	1:48.20	
5	Yu Tae-Gyeong	South Korea	1:48.61	
6	Eversley Linley	Saint Vincent and the Grenadines	1:51.71	
7	Lui Muavesi	Fiji	1:54.48	
—	Haji Bakr Al-Qahtani	Saudi Arabia	DSQ	

==== Heat 3 ====
Rank	Athlete	Nation	Time	Notes
1	Johnny Gray	United States	1:48.83	Q
2	Ari Suhonen	Finland	1:48.90	Q
3	Ibrahim Okash	Somalia	1:48.97	Q
4	António Abrantes	Portugal	1:49.01	
5	Mauricio Hernández	Mexico	1:49.03	
6	Kenneth Dzekedzeke	Malawi	1:50.60	
7	Lin Kuang-Liang	Chinese Taipei	1:52.95	

==== Heat 4 ====
Rank	Athlete	Nation	Time	Notes
1	Vladimir Graudyn	Soviet Union	1:48.90	Q
2	Pablo Squella	Chile	1:48.99	Q
3	Alvaro Silva	Portugal	1:49.09	Q
4	Mark Everett	United States	1:49.86	
5	Mike Watson	Bermuda	1:50.16	
6	Syed Meshaq Rizvi	Pakistan	1:51.58	
7	Manlio Molinari	San Marino	1:52.35	
8	John Siguria	Papua New Guinea	1:56.12	

==== Heat 5 ====
Rank	Athlete	Nation	Time	Notes
1	Saïd Aouita	Morocco	1:49.67	Q
2	Simon Hoogewerf	Canada	1:49.76	Q
3	Cheikh Tidiane Boye	Senegal	1:49.89	Q
4	Tracy Baskin	United States	1:50.38	
5	Ado Maude	Nigeria	1:50.48	
6	Eulucane Ndagijimana	Rwanda	1:52.08	
7	Maher Abbas	Lebanon	1:53.76	
8	David Sawyerr	Sierra Leone	1:57.88	

==== Heat 6 ====
Rank	Athlete	Nation	Time	Notes
1	Peter Braun	West Germany	1:47.32	Q
2	Rob Druppers	Netherlands	1:47.48	Q
3	Tonino Viali	Italy	1:47.74	Q
4	Bobby Gaseitsiwe	Botswana	1:48.08	
5	Agberto Guimarães	Brazil	1:48.49	
6	Fahmi Abdul Wahab	North Yemen	1:55.24	
7	Momodou Bello N'Jie	The Gambia	1:55.57	
8	Nimley Twegbe	Liberia	1:58.43	

==== Heat 7 ====
Rank	Athlete	Nation	Time	Notes
1	Peter Elliott	Great Britain	1:46.83	Q
2	Robin van Helden	Netherlands	1:46.99	Q
3	Juma Ndiwa	Kenya	1:47.11	Q
4	Tomás de Teresa	Spain	1:47.32	q
5	Ahmed Bel Kessam	Algeria	1:47.96	q
6	Duan Xiuquan	China	1:52.17	
—	Kazanga Makok	Zaire	DSQ	
—	Tommy Asinga	Suriname	DSQ	

==== Heat 8 ====
Rank	Athlete	Nation	Time	Notes
1	Paul Ereng	Kenya	1:46.14	Q
2	José Luíz Barbosa	Brazil	1:46.32	Q
3	Slobodan Popović	Yugoslavia	1:46.49	Q
4	Colomán Trabado	Spain	1:46.76	q
5	Paul Osland	Canada	1:47.16	q
6	Mohamed Hossain Milzer	Bangladesh	1:51.16	
7	Josep Graells	Andorra	1:53.34	

==== Heat 9 ====
Rank	Athlete	Nation	Time	Notes
1	Joaquim Cruz	Brazil	1:47.16	Q
2	Tom McKean	Great Britain	1:47.24	Q
3	Melford Homela	Zimbabwe	1:47.36	Q
4	Réda Abdenouz	Algeria	1:47.67	q
5	Dale Jones	Antigua and Barbuda	1:49.31	
6	João N'Tyamba	Angola	1:53.23	
7	Oslen Barr	Guyana	1:55.95	
8	William Taramai	Cook Islands	1:58.80	

=== Quarterfinals ===
The quarterfinals were held on Saturday, 24 September 1988.

==== Quarterfinal 1 ====
Rank	Athlete	Nation	Time	Notes
1	Joaquim Cruz	Brazil	1:46.10	Q
2	Paul Ereng	Kenya	1:46.38	Q
3	Cheikh Boyé	Senegal	1:46.62	Q
4	Réda Abdenouz	Algeria	1:46.97	Q
5	Vladimir Graudyn	Soviet Union	1:47.07	
6	Paul Osland	Canada	1:48.02	
7	Tonino Viali	Italy	1:50.85	
—	Ari Suhonen	Finland	DNF	

==== Quarterfinal 2 ====
Rank	Athlete	Nation	Time	Notes
1	Johnny Gray	United States	1:45.96	Q
2	Simon Hoogewerf	Canada	1:45.99	Q
3	José Luíz Barbosa	Brazil	1:46.20	Q
4	Ibrahim Okash	Somalia	1:46.55	Q
5	Rob Druppers	Netherlands	1:46.91	
6	Juma Ndiwa	Kenya	1:47.27	
7	Faouzi Lahbi	Morocco	1:47.32	
—	Tom McKean	Great Britain	~~1:46.40~~	DSQ

==== Quarterfinal 3 ====
Rank	Athlete	Nation	Time	Notes
1	Saïd Aouita	Morocco	1:45.24	Q
2	Slobodan Popović	Yugoslavia	1:45.30	Q
3	Babacar Niang	Senegal	1:45.38	Q
4	Nixon Kiprotich	Kenya	1:45.68	Q
5	Pablo Squella	Chile	1:46.45	
6	Steve Cram	Great Britain	1:46.47	
7	Robin van Helden	Netherlands	1:46.61	
8	Tomas de Teresa	Spain	1:48.01	

==== Quarterfinal 4 ====
Rank	Athlete	Nation	Time	Notes
1	Donato Sabia	Italy	1:46.58	Q
2	Peter Elliott	Great Britain	1:46.61	Q
3	Alvaro Silva	Portugal	1:46.65	Q
4	Peter Braun	West Germany	1:46.86	Q
5	Ahmed Belkessam	Algeria	1:46.93	
6	Ryszard Ostrowski	Poland	1:47.72	
7	Colomán Trabado	Spain	1:48.12	
8	Melford Homela	Zimbabwe	1:49.62	

=== Semifinals ===
The semifinals were held on Sunday, 25 September 1988.

==== Semifinal 1 ====
Rank	Athlete	Nation	Time	Notes
1	Paul Ereng	Kenya	1:44.55	Q
2	Joaquim Cruz	Brazil	1:44.75	Q
3	Donato Sabia	Italy	1:44.90	Q
4	Peter Elliott	Great Britain	1:44.94	Q
5	Babacar Niang	Senegal	1:45.09	
6	Slobodan Popović	Yugoslavia	1:45.11	
7	Simon Hoogewerf	Canada	1:47.30	
8	Peter Braun	West Germany	1:47.43	

==== Semifinal 2 ====
Rank	Athlete	Nation	Time	Notes
1	Nixon Kiprotich	Kenya	1:44.71	Q
2	Saïd Aouita	Morocco	1:44.79	Q
3	José Luíz Barbosa	Brazil	1:44.99	Q
4	Johnny Gray	United States	1:45.04	Q
5	Alvaro Silva	Portugal	1:45.12	
6	Cheikh Boyé	Senegal	1:45.93	
7	Réda Abdenouz	Algeria	1:45.95	
8	Ibrahim Okash	Somalia	1:46.62	

=== Final ===
Rank	Athlete	Nation	Time
1st place, gold medalist(s)	Paul Ereng	Kenya	1:43.55
2nd place, silver medalist(s)	Joaquim Cruz	Brazil	1:43.90
3rd place, bronze medalist(s)	Saïd Aouita	Morocco	1:44.06
4	Peter Elliott	Great Britain	1:44.12
5	Johnny Gray	United States	1:44.80
6	José Luíz Barbosa	Brazil	1:46.39
7	Donato Sabia	Italy	1:48.03
8	Nixon Kiprotich	Kenya	1:49.55

== See also ==
- 1986 Men's European Championships 800 metres (Stuttgart)
- 1987 Men's World Championships 800 metres (Rome)
- 1990 Men's European Championships 800 metres (Split)
