= Athletics at the 1985 Summer Universiade – Men's 800 metres =

The men's 800 metres event at the 1985 Summer Universiade was held at the Kobe Universiade Memorial Stadium in Kobe on 2, 3, and 4 September 1985.

== Medalists ==
Gold	Silver	Bronze
Ryszard Ostrowski; Poland	Viktor Kalinkin; Soviet Union	John Marshall; United States

== Results ==
=== Heats ===
Rank	Heat	Athlete	Nationality	Time	Notes
1	3	Petru Drăgoescu	Romania	1:47.75	Q
2	2	Ocky Clark	United States	1:47.87	Q
2	3	Rob Harrison	Great Britain	1:47.87	Q
4	2	Simon Hoogewerf	Canada	1:48.06	Q
5	2	Matt Favier	Australia	1:48.12	Q
6	5	Viktor Kalinkin	Soviet Union	1:48.24	Q
7	2	Akanni Gbadamosi	Nigeria	1:48.38	q
8	2	Javier Nieto	Spain	1:48.39	q
9	3	Jürgen Grothe	West Germany	1:48.40	q
10	5	Herbert Wursthorn	West Germany	1:48.56	Q
11	5	Slobodan Popović	Yugoslavia	1:48.60	q
12	4	John Marshall	United States	1:48.70	Q
13	3	Ryu Tae-kyung	South Korea	1:48.71	q
14	4	Anatoliy Millin	Soviet Union	1:48.72	Q
15	4	Benjamín González	Spain	1:48.77	
16	3	Héctor Flores	Mexico	1:48.91	
17	5	Alberto Barsotti	Italy	1:49.27	
18	5	Toru Shiota	Japan	1:49.64	
19	4	Yutaka Hoshino	Japan	1:50.08	
20	3	Syed Meesaq Rizvi	Pakistan	1:50.23	
21	2	Paul Gambrah	Ghana	1:50.27	
22	1	Ryszard Ostrowski	Poland	1:50.65	Q
23	1	Chris McGeorge	Great Britain	1:50.76	Q
24	1	Manuel Balmaceda	Chile	1:51.03	
25	1	Ahmed Belkessam	Algeria	1:51.21	
26	1	Mustapha Lachaal	Morocco	1:51.24	
27	2	Rachid Kram	Algeria	1:51.26	
28	4	Philippos Stylianoudis	Cyprus	1:51.55	
29	3	David Montañez	Puerto Rico	1:51.60	
30	1	Danson Chepkwony	Kenya	1:51.81	
31	1	Sebastien Wschiansky	Switzerland	1:51.96	
32	3	Alex Ngeno	Kenya	1:53.07	
33	5	Luis Mena	Costa Rica	1:54.26	
34	4	John Siguria	Papua New Guinea	1:57.70	
35	5	M. Luveniyali	Fiji	2:02.61	
36	2	Byron Vargas	Honduras	2:08.80	

=== Semifinals ===
Rank	Heat	Athlete	Nationality	Time	Notes
1	2	Viktor Kalinkin	Soviet Union	1:46.93	Q
2	2	Ryszard Ostrowski	Poland	1:47.10	Q
3	2	Ocky Clark	United States	1:47.45	Q
4	1	Anatoliy Millin	Soviet Union	1:47.58	Q
5	1	John Marshall	United States	1:47.58	Q
6	2	Herbert Wursthorn	West Germany	1:47.65	q
7	2	Slobodan Popović	Yugoslavia	1:47.66	q
8	1	Petru Drăgoescu	Romania	1:47.68	Q
9	1	Chris McGeorge	Great Britain	1:47.69	
10	1	Simon Hoogewerf	Canada	1:47.81	
11	1	Javier Nieto	Spain	1:47.87	
12	2	Rob Harrison	Great Britain	1:47.99	
13	1	Jürgen Grothe	West Germany	1:48.26	
14	1	Matt Favier	Australia	1:48.29	
15	2	Akanni Gbadamosi	Nigeria	1:48.33	
16	2	Ryu Tae-kyung	South Korea	1:49.13	

=== Final ===
Rank	Athlete	Nationality	Time	Notes
1st place, gold medalist(s)	Ryszard Ostrowski	Poland	1:44.38	NR
2nd place, silver medalist(s)	Viktor Kalinkin	Soviet Union	1:45.21	
3rd place, bronze medalist(s)	John Marshall	United States	1:45.32	
4	Petru Drăgoescu	Romania	1:45.41	NR
5	Ocky Clark	United States	1:45.51	
6	Slobodan Popović	Yugoslavia	1:46.09	
7	Anatoliy Millin	Soviet Union	1:46.60	
8	Herbert Wursthorn	West Germany	1:46.77	
