= Athletics at the Friendship Games – Men's 800 metres =

The men's 800 metres event at the Friendship Games was held on 17 and 18 August 1984 at the Grand Arena of the Central Lenin Stadium in Moscow, Soviet Union.

== Medalists ==
Gold	Silver	Bronze
Alberto Juantorena; Cuba; Ryszard Ostrowski; Poland		Viktor Kalinkin; Soviet Union

== Results ==
=== Heats ===
Rank	Name	Nationality	Time	Notes
9	André Lavie	France	1:50.86	
10	S. Suanatuuni	Madagascar	1:55.70	
11	Sekou Camara	Guinea	1:57.78	
12	Adam Assimi	Benin	1:58.62	
13	Philip Sinon	Seychelles	2:00.44	
14	A. Fahim	South Yemen	2:02.95	
15	S. Choun	Cambodia	2:09.65	
16	B. Sophon	Cambodia	2:12.33	
	R. Idong	Guinea	?:??.??	

=== Final ===
Rank	Name	Nationality	Time	Notes
1st place, gold medalist(s)	Alberto Juantorena	Cuba	1:45.68	
1st place, gold medalist(s)	Ryszard Ostrowski	Poland	1:45.68	
3rd place, bronze medalist(s)	Viktor Kalinkin	Soviet Union	1:45.83	
4	Vasiliy Matveyev	Soviet Union	1:46.23	
5	Leonid Masunov	Soviet Union	1:47.44	
6	Andreas Hauck	East Germany	1:47.79	
7	Ronny Olsson	Sweden	1:48.07	
8	Tisbite Rakotoarisoa	Madagascar	1:50.31	

== See also ==
- Athletics at the 1984 Summer Olympics – Men's 800 metres
