= Viktor Kalinkin =

Soviet middle-distance runner

Personal information
- Born: 23 February 1960 (age 66) Kirillovo, Zemetchinsky District, Soviet Union
- Height: 1.80 m (5 ft 11 in)
- Weight: 70 kg (154 lb)

Sport
- Sport: Athletics
- Event: 800 metres
Medal record
Representing Soviet Union
Summer Universiade
Silver medal – second place	1985 Kobe	800m

Viktor Petrovich Kalinkin (Russian: Виктор Петрович Калинкин; born 23 February 1960) is a Soviet former middle-distance runner who specialised in the 800 metres. He represented his country at the 1983 World Championships. In addition he won the silver at the 1985 Summer Universiade.

== International competitions ==
Year	Competition	Venue	Position	Event	Notes
Representing the Soviet Union
1983	Universiade	Edmonton, Canada	7th	800 m	1:49.07
1983	World Championships	Helsinki, Finland	13th (sf)	800 m	1:46.83
1984	Friendship Games	Moscow, Soviet Union	3rd	800 m	1:45.82
1985	European Indoor Championships	Piraeus, Greece	4th	800 m	1:49.92
1985	European Indoor Championships	Piraeus, Greece	–	1500 m	DNF
1985	Universiade	Kobe, Japan	2nd	800 m	1:45.21
1985	World Cup	Canberra, Australia	2nd	800 m	1:45.72
1986	Goodwill Games	Moscow, Soviet Union	5th	800 m	1:47.42
1986	European Championships	Stuttgart, West Germany	8th	800 m	1:47.36

== Personal bests ==
Outdoor

- 800 metres – 1:44.73 (Kiev 1984)
- 1000 metres – 2:19.21 (Tallinn 1985)
- 1500 metres – 3:37.1 (Moscow 1984)

Indoor

- 600 metres – 1:16.83 (Moscow 1989)
- 800 metres – 1:47.6 (Moscow 1991)
- 1000 metres – 2:19.89 (Moscow 1984)
- 1500 metres – 3:44.32 (Volgograd 1988)
