= Slobodan Popović =

Serbian runner (born 1962)

Personal information
- Born: 28 September 1962 (age 64) Inđija, SR Serbia, SFR Yugoslavia
- Height: 1.79 m (5 ft 10 in)
- Weight: 63 kg (139 lb)

Sport
- Sport: Track and field
- Event: 800 metres
- Club: Crvena Zvezda
Medal record
Men's Athletics
Representing Yugoslavia
Universiade
Gold medal – first place	1987 Zagreb	800 m
Silver medal – second place	1987 Zagreb	4×400 m

Slobodan Popović (Cyrillic: Слободан Поповић; born 28 September 1962) is a Serbian former middle distance runner who primarily competed in the 800 metres. He represented his country at the 1988 Summer Olympics and in the 1992 Summer Olympics.

== International competitions ==
Year	Competition	Venue	Position	Event	Notes
Representing Yugoslavia
1983	Mediterranean Games	Casablanca, Morocco	4th	4 × 400 m relay	3:07.00
1985	European Indoor Championships	Piraeus, Greece	10th (h)	800 m	1:51.35
1985	Universiade	Kobe, Japan	13th (sf)	400 m	46.74
1985	Universiade	Kobe, Japan	6th	800 m	1:46.09
1986	European Championships	Stuttgart, Germany	19th (h)	800 m	1:48.68
1986	European Championships	Stuttgart, Germany	7th	4 × 400 m relay	3:05.27
1987	European Indoor Championships	Liévin, France	16th (h)	800 m	1:52.51
1987	World Indoor Championships	Indianapolis, United States	5th	800 m	1:48.07
1987	Universiade	Zagreb, Yugoslavia	1st	800 m	1:46.13
1987	Universiade	Zagreb, Yugoslavia	2nd	4 × 400 m relay	3:03.95
1987	World Championships	Rome, Italy	7th	800 m	1:45.07
1987	World Championships	Rome, Italy	10th (sf)	4 × 400 m relay	3:03.30
1988	European Indoor Championships	Budapest, Hungary	5th	800 m	1:50.02
1988	Olympic Games	Seoul, South Korea	10th (sf)	800 m	1:45.11
1988	Olympic Games	Seoul, South Korea	5th (h)	4 × 400 m relay	3:01.59
1990	European Indoor Championships	Glasgow, United Kingdom	7th (sf)	800 m	1:50.50
1990	European Championships	Split, Yugoslavia	5th	800 m	1:45.90
1990	European Championships	Split, Yugoslavia	5th	4 × 400 m relay	3:02.46
1991	World Championships	Tokyo, Japan	12th (h)	800 m	1:46.89
Competing as Independent Olympic Athlete
1992	Olympic Games	Barcelona, Spain	34th (h)	800 m	1:49.69
Representing FR Yugoslavia
1994	European Championships	Helsinki, Finland	14th (h)	800 m	1:48.85

== Personal bests ==
Outdoor

- 400 metres – 46.49 (Sarajevo 1987)
- 800 metres – 1:44.75 (Linz 1988) NR
- 1000 metres – 2:18.88 (London 1989) NR

Indoor

- 400 metres – 47.14 (Budapest 1988)
- 800 metres – 1:46.44 (Turin 1988) NR
