= 1984 European Athletics Indoor Championships – Men's 800 metres =

The men's 800 metres event at the 1984 European Athletics Indoor Championships was held on 3 and 4 March.

== Medalists ==
Gold	Silver	Bronze
Donato Sabia; Italy	André Lavie; France	Phil Norgate; Great Britain

== Results ==
=== Heats ===
First 2 from each heat (Q) and the next 2 fastest (q) qualified for the final.

Rank	Heat	Name	Nationality	Time	Notes
1	2	Ikem Billy	Great Britain	1:49.85	Q
2	1	André Lavie	France	1:50.01	Q
3	1	Phil Norgate	Great Britain	1:50.23	Q
4	2	Piotr Piekarski	Poland	1:50.28	Q
5	2	Donato Sabia	Italy	1:50.44	q
6	2	Ronny Olsson	Sweden	1:50.62	q
7	1	Dieter Riebe	West Germany	1:50.62	
8	1	Krzysztof Prądzyński	Poland	1:52.45	
9	2	Frode Hansen	Norway	1:52.56	
	1	Tonino Viali	Italy	DQ	

=== Final ===
Rank	Name	Nationality	Time	Notes
1st place, gold medalist(s)	Donato Sabia	Italy	1:48.05	
2nd place, silver medalist(s)	André Lavie	France	1:48.35	
3rd place, bronze medalist(s)	Phil Norgate	Great Britain	1:48.39	
4	Ikem Billy	Great Britain	1:48.41	
5	Ronny Olsson	Sweden	1:48.75	
6	Piotr Piekarski	Poland	1:51.98	
