= Colomán Trabado =

Spanish middle-distance runner

Medal record

Men's athletics

Representing Spain

European Indoor Championships
Bronze medal – third place	1982 Milan	800 m

Colomán Trabado Pérez (born 2 January 1958 in Vega de Valcarce, El Bierzo, León Province) is a retired middle-distance runner from Spain. He won the European Indoor Championships in 1983 and the inaugural World Indoor Games in 1985.

An athletics stadium in Ponferrada, the main city of the El Bierzo region, is named the Estadio Municipal de Atletismo Colomán Trabado.

== International competitions ==
Year	Competition	Venue	Position	Event	Notes
Representing Spain
1977	European Junior Championships	Donetsk, Soviet Union	9th (h)	4 × 400 m relay	3:15.7
1979	Mediterranean Games	Split, Yugoslavia	5th	800 m	1:47.37
1979	Mediterranean Games	Split, Yugoslavia	4th	4 × 400 m relay	3:11.20
1980	European Indoor Championships	Sindelfingen, West Germany	5th (h)	800 m	1:50.4^{1}
1980	Olympic Games	Moscow, Soviet Union	16th (sf)	800 m	1:48.1
1980	Olympic Games	Moscow, Soviet Union	12th (h)	4 × 400 m relay	3:06.9
1982	European Indoor Championships	Milan, Italy	3rd	800 m	1:48.35
1982	European Championships	Athens, Greece	14th (sf)	800 m	1:49.38
1982	European Championships	Athens, Greece	–	4 × 400 m relay	DNF
1983	European Indoor Championships	Budapest, Hungary	1st	800 m	1:46.91
1983	World Championships	Helsinki, Finland	14th (sf)	800 m	1:46.85
1983	Mediterranean Games	Casablanca, Morocco	3rd	800 m	1:52.19
1984	Olympic Games	Los Angeles, United States	4th (h)	800 m	1:46.00^{2}
1985	World Indoor Games	Paris, France	1st	800 m	1:47.42
1985	European Indoor Championships	Piraeus, Greece	8th (sf)	800 m	1:49.08
1986	European Indoor Championships	Madrid, Spain	2nd	800 m	1:49.12
1986	European Championships	Stuttgart, West Germany	22nd (h)	800 m	1:49.42
1987	European Indoor Championships	Liévin, France	8th	800 m	2:14.16
1988	European Indoor Championships	Budapest, Hungary	9th (sf)	800 m	1:49.08
1988	Ibero-American Championships	Mexico City, Mexico	1st	800 m	1:47.16
1988	Olympic Games	Seoul, South Korea	28th (qf)	800 m	1:48.12

^{1}Disqualified in the final
^{2}Did not finish in the quarterfinals
