= Vladimir Graudyn =

Russian former track and field athlete (born 1963)

Medal record

Men's athletics

Representing the Soviet Union

World Indoor Championships
Silver medal – second place	1987 Indianapolis	800 m

European Indoor Championships
Silver medal – second place	1987 Liévin	800 m

Vladimir Vladimirovich Graudyn (Владимир Владимирович Граудынь; born 26 August 1963)^{[nb]} is a Russian former track and field athlete who competed in the 800 metres for the Soviet Union. He was a silver medallist at both the IAAF World Indoor Championships and European Athletics Indoor Championships in 1987.

Graudyn represented his country at the World Championships in Athletics that same year and also raced at the 1988 Summer Olympics. He was a three-time national champion. His personal best for the 800 m was 1:44.10 minutes.

== Career ==
Born in Moscow, Graudyn joined the Spartak Minsk based in the Belarus SSR. He first emerged at national level at the 1986 Soviet Spartakiad, where he was the gold medallist in the 1500 metres in a time of 3:44.29 minutes. He also won the 800 m champion at the Soviet Indoor Athletics Championships that year – a title which he defended the following year. On his major international debut he reached the semi-finals at the 1986 European Athletics Championships.

Graudyn had most of his success at international in the 1987 season. At the 1987 European Athletics Indoor Championships he took the silver medal in the 800 m behind Dutchman Rob Druppers in a tactical race. The following month he competed at the 1987 IAAF World Indoor Championships and repeated that finish, coming second but this time to Brazil's José Luíz Barbosa. He was the Soviet Union's only ever medallist in the men's event at that competition. He was the Soviet Union's best performer in the 800 m at the 1987 World Championships in Athletics, missing qualification for the final by a margin of three hundredths and outperforming Andrey Sudnik.

Graudyn set a personal best of 1:44.10 minutes at the Bislett Games in 1988 – this time placed him in the top ten in the world that year and he was third among Europeans, bettered only by British duo Steve Cram and Sebastian Coe. However, he failed to match this form at the 1988 Seoul Olympics, being eliminated in the quarter-final round. That proved to be the last major international event that he ran at. His wife, Yuliya Graudyn, would later win world and European medals for Russia.

== National titles ==
- Soviet Spartakiad
  - 1500 metres: 1986
- Soviet Indoor Athletics Championships
  - 800 metres: 1986, 1987

== International competitions ==
Year	Competition	Venue	Position	Event	Notes
1986	European Championships	Stuttgart, West Germany	5th (semis)	800 m	1:47.50
1987	European Indoor Championships	Liévin, France	2nd	800 m	1:49.14
1987	World Indoor Championships	Indianapolis, United States	2nd	800 m	1:47.68
1987	World Championships	Rome, Italy	6th (semis)	800 m	1:45.36
1988	Olympic Games	Seoul, South Korea	5th (q-finals)	800 m	1:47.07

== Notes ==
- ^{nb} Some sources list his birth date as 4 October 1963.
