= Athletics at the 1991 Summer Universiade – Men's 1500 metres =

The men's 1500 metres event at the 1991 Summer Universiade was held at the Don Valley Stadium in Sheffield on 24 and 25 July 1991.

== Medalists ==
Gold	Silver	Bronze
Niall Bruton; Ireland	Davide Tirelli; Italy	Juan Viudes; Spain

== Results ==
=== Heats ===
Rank	Heat	Athlete	Nationality	Time	Notes
1	2	Robin van Helden	Netherlands	3:43.64	Q
2	2	Davide Tirelli	Italy	3:44.00	Q
3	2	Robert Whelan	United States	3:44.31	Q
4	2	Waldemar Glinka	Poland	3:44.53	q
5	2	Davey Wilson	Great Britain	3:44.66	q
6	2	Juan Viudes	Spain	3:46.41	q
7	2	Shipo Dlamini	Swaziland	3:48.48	
8	1	Niall Bruton	Ireland	3:49.01	Q
9	1	Federico Gallego	Spain	3:49.38	Q
10	1	Amos Rota	Italy	3:49.39	Q
11	1	Daniel Bertoia	Canada	3:49.47	
12	1	Milan Drahoňovský	Czechoslovakia	3:49.70	
13	3	Doug Consiglio	Canada	3:51.49	Q
14	3	Bill Burke	United States	3:51.52	Q
15	3	Frank Wiegman	Netherlands	3:51.66	Q
16	3	Samuel Kibiri	Kenya	3:51.68	
17	3	Pierre Morath	Switzerland	3:52.10	
18	3	Andrew Geddes	Great Britain	3:52.17	
19	1	Ahmet Çetinbaş	Turkey	3:54.12	
20	3	Abderrahim Benjaa	Morocco	3:54.25	
21	3	Hamid Sajjadi	Iran	3:54.70	
22	1	Robbie Johnston	New Zealand	3:55.19	
23	3	Tommy Asinga	Suriname	3:57.42	
24	1	Abdelah Zouhane	Morocco	3:57.84	
25	2	Pedro Rocha	Portugal	3:59.13	
26	2	Andreas Christodoulou	Cyprus	3:59.40	
27	1	Solomon Kioni	Kenya	3:59.46	
28	3	Martin Reid	Jamaica	3:59.58	
29	1	Samuel Huwae	Indonesia	4:00.47	
30	1	Elijah Mushemeza	Uganda	4:03.89	
31	2	Kim Bong-yu	South Korea	4:04.79	
32	3	Noel Vilivata	Solomon Islands	4:12.89	
33	3	Alberto Silva	Guinea-Bissau	4:18.89	NR
34	1	Octavio Gómes	Guinea-Bissau	4:20.39	
35	2	Nicodemus Eatlawe	Tanzania	4:20.93	
36	2	Christian Cremona	Malta	4:23.41	
37	1	Mohammad Fani	Iran	4:27.94	
	2	Riad Gatt	Algeria	DQ	
	3	Idriss Vassir	Sudan	DNF	

=== Final ===
Rank	Athlete	Nationality	Time	Notes
1st place, gold medalist(s)	Niall Bruton	Ireland	3:50.69	
2nd place, silver medalist(s)	Davide Tirelli	Italy	3:50.79	
3rd place, bronze medalist(s)	Juan Viudes	Spain	3:51.22	
4	Doug Consiglio	Canada	3:51.28	
5	Robin van Helden	Netherlands	3:51.84	
6	Davey Wilson	Great Britain	3:51.96	
7	Robert Whelan	United States	3:52.03	
8	Bill Burke	United States	3:52.04	
9	Federico Gallego	Spain	3:52.38	
10	Frank Wiegman	Netherlands	3:52.49	
11	Amos Rota	Italy	3:52.63	
12	Waldemar Glinka	Poland	3:52.63	
