= Peter Braun (runner) =

German middle-distance runner

Personal information
- Born: 1 August 1962 (age 63) Tuttlingen, West Germany
- Height: 1.83 m (6 ft 0 in)
- Weight: 64 kg (141 lb)

Sport
- Sport: Athletics
- Event: 800 metres
- Club: LG Tuttlingen-Fridingen; MTV Ingolstadt

Peter Braun (born 1 August 1962 in Tuttlingen) is a retired German middle-distance runner who specialised in the 800 metres. He won the gold medal at the 1986 European Indoor Championships. In addition, he competed at the 1988 Summer Olympics and 1987 World Championships.

== International competitions ==
Year	Competition	Venue	Position	Event	Notes
Representing West Germany
1985	European Indoor Championships	Piraeus, Greece	17th (h)	800 m	1:50.50
1986	European Indoor Championships	Madrid, Spain	1st	800 m	1:48.96
1986	European Championships	Stuttgart, West Germany	6th	800 m	1:45.83
1987	World Championships	Rome, Italy	25th (qf)	800 m	1:48.53
1988	Olympic Games	Seoul, South Korea	16th (sf)	800 m	1:47.43
1992	European Indoor Championships	Genoa, Italy	5th	800 m	1:47.19

== Personal bests ==
Outdoors

- 400 metres – 47.19 (Kevelaer 1986)
- 800 metres – 1:44.03 (Koblenz 1986)
- 1000 metres – 2:20.90 (Wattenscheid 1989)
- 1500 metres – 3:44.44 (Koblenz 1989)

Indoors

- 800 metres – 1:47.19 (Genoa 1992)
