= Tony Morrell =

English middle-distance runner

Personal information
- Born: 3 May 1962 (age 63) Hartlepool, England
- Height: 6"4

Sport
- Sport: Athletics
- Event(s): 800 m, 1500 m
- Club: Morpeth
- Coached by: Gordon Surtees

Anthony Morrell (born 3 May 1962) is a male English retired middle-distance runner.

== Biography ==
Morrell won the bronze medal in the 1500 metres at the 1990 European Athletics Indoor Championships. In addition, he represented Great Britain at the 1987 World Championships and 1987 World Indoor Championships.

He represented England in the 1,500 metres event, at the 1990 Commonwealth Games in Auckland, New Zealand.

Morrell finished second behind Peter Elliott in the 800 metres event at the 1987 AAA Championships and second behind Sebastian Coe in the 1500 metres event at the 1989 AAA Championships.

== International competitions ==
Year	Competition	Venue	Position	Event	Notes
Representing Great Britain and England
1987	European Indoor Championships	Liévin, France	6th	800 m	1:58.31
1987	World Indoor Championships	Indianapolis, United States	9th (h)	800 m	1:50.39
1987	World Championships	Rome, Italy	17th (qf)	800 m	1:46.25
1988	European Indoor Championships	Budapest, Hungary	4th	800 m	1:49.89
1990	Commonwealth Games	Auckland, New Zealand	5th	1500 m	3:35.87
1990	European Indoor Championships	Glasgow, United Kingdom	3rd	1500 m	3:44.83

== Personal bests ==
Outdoor

- 800 metres – 1:44.59 (Oslo 1988)
- 1000 metres – 2:16.99 1988)
- 1500 metres – 3:34.1 (Oslo 1990)
- One mile – 3:51.31 (Oslo 1990)

Indoor

- 600 metres – 1:17.69 (Cosford 1987)
- 800 metres – 1:45.72 (Gent 1988)
- 1000 metres – 2:19.25 (Cosford 1988)
- 1500 metres – 3:38.70 (San Sebastián 1990)
