= 1990 European Athletics Indoor Championships – Men's 1500 metres =

The men's 1500 metres event at the 1990 European Athletics Indoor Championships was held in Kelvin Hall on 3 and 4 March.

== Medalists ==
Gold	Silver	Bronze
Jens-Peter Herold; East Germany	Fermín Cacho; Spain	Tony Morrell; Great Britain

== Results ==
=== Heats ===
First 3 from each heat (Q) and the next 2 fastest (q) qualified for the final.

Rank	Heat	Name	Nationality	Time	Notes
1	1	Jens-Peter Herold	East Germany	3:42.63	Q
2	1	Fermín Cacho	Spain	3:42.99	Q
3	1	Tony Morrell	Great Britain	3:43.42	Q
4	2	Steffen Brand	West Germany	3:44.48	Q
5	2	Teófilo Benito	Spain	3:44.76	Q
6	2	Rob Harrison	Great Britain	3:44.84	Q
7	2	António Monteiro	Portugal	3:45.01	q
8	1	Róbert Banai	Hungary	3:45.54	q
9	1	Marc Corstjens	Belgium	3:45.80	
10	2	Víctor Rojas	Spain	3:45.92	
11	1	Davide Tirelli	Italy	3:48.68	
	1	Ronny Olsson	Sweden	DQ	
	2	Enda Fitzpatrick	Ireland	DNS	

=== Final ===
Rank	Name	Nationality	Time	Notes
1st place, gold medalist(s)	Jens-Peter Herold	East Germany	3:44.39	
2nd place, silver medalist(s)	Fermín Cacho	Spain	3:44.61	
3rd place, bronze medalist(s)	Tony Morrell	Great Britain	3:44.83	
4	Steffen Brand	West Germany	3:45.58	
5	Teófilo Benito	Spain	3:47.13	
6	António Monteiro	Portugal	3:47.46	
7	Róbert Banai	Hungary	3:48.50	
8	Rob Harrison	Great Britain	3:53.29	
