= Álvaro Silva (athlete) =

Portuguese sprinter (1965–2025)

Personal information
- Full name: Álvaro Manuel Santos Rosa Silva
- Nationality: Portuguese
- Born: 21 April 1965 Lisbon, Portugal
- Died: 29 April 2025 (aged 60)
- Height: 1.77 m (5 ft 10 in)

Sport
- Sport: Sprinting
- Events: 400 metres 800 metres 4 × 400 metres relay
- Club: SL Benfica

Álvaro Manuel Santos Rosa Silva (21 April 1965 – 29 April 2025) was a Portuguese athlete who specialized in the 800 metres. He ran the 400 metres early in his career, and was on the national team in the 4 × 400 metres relay, competing in two Olympic Games.

== Biography ==
In individual races, Silva finished fifth at both the 1983 and 1988 Ibero-American Championships. Furthermore, he competed in the 1983 European Junior Championships, the 1986 European Championships, the 1987 World Championships, the 1988 European Indoor Championships, the 1988 Olympic Games and the 1989 European Indoor Championships without reaching the final.

As a relay runner, Silva finished fourth at the 1983 Ibero-American Championships, won a bronze medal at the 1988 Ibero-American Championships, reached the semi-final at the 1988 Olympic Games, before only reaching the heat at the 1992 Olympic Games.

His personal best times were 46.6 seconds in the 400 metres and 1:45.12 minutes in the 800 metres, both achieved in 1988. In August 1991 he set his lifetime best in the 1500 metres of 3:38.73 minutes.

Silva died on 29 April 2025, at the age of 60.
