= Kim Bok-joo =

South Korean middle-distance runner

Personal information
- Born: 17 October 1960 (age 65)

Sport
- Sport: Track and field
Medal record
Representing South Korea
Asian Games
Gold medal – first place	1986 Seoul	800m
Silver medal – second place	1982 New Delhi	800m

Kim Bok-joo (born 17 October 1960) is a South Korean former middle-distance runner who competed in the 1984 Summer Olympics. He also competed in the 800 m heats at the 1983 World Championships in Athletics and 1983 Summer Universiade.

Kim won his first major regional medal at the 1982 Asian Games, taking the 800 m silver medal behind India's Charles Borromeo (athlete). He was the 1986 Asian Games gold medallist in the 800 m and a silver medalist in the 1500 m.

== See also ==
- List of Asian Games medalists in athletics
- South Korea at the Asian Games

== Notes ==
- Some English-language sources, such as GBR Athletics, erroneously state that Kim Bok-joo was winner of the 1990 men's 800 m and the 1500 m silver medallist, as well as the 1991 Asian Championships runner-up. Contemporary English and Korean sources indicate it was his similarly named teammate Kim Bong-yu who achieved these feats.
