= Ado Maude =

Nigerian middle-distance runner

Personal information
- Nationality: Nigerian
- Born: 15 February 1967 (age 59)

Sport
- Sport: Middle-distance running
- Event: 800 metres

Ado Maude (born 15 February 1967) is a Nigerian middle-distance runner. He competed in the men's 800 metres at the 1988 Summer Olympics.
