= Stephen Ole Marai =

Kenyan middle-distance runner (born 1962)

Stephen Ole Marai (born 11 November 1962) is a Kenyan male former middle-distance runner. He was a finalist in the 800 metres at the 1987 World Championships in Athletics and finished sixth despite Tom McKean catching his foot on the last lap. His personal best time of 1.44.42 minutes was achieved in 1990 and ranked him sixth in the world that year. He also competed at the 1987 All-Africa Games in his native Kenya, where he was a silver medallist behind his compatriot and world champion Billy Konchellah.

== International competitions ==
Year	Competition	Venue	Position	Event	Notes
1987	World Championships	Rome, Italy	6th	800 m	1:44.84
1987	All-Africa Games	Nairobi, Kenya	2nd	800 m	1:46.64 A

== See also ==
- List of African Games medalists in athletics (men)
