= Leonid Masunov =

Ukrainian distance runner (born 1962)

Personal information
- Native name: Леонід Іванович Масунов
- Full name: Leonid Ivanovych Masunov
- National team: Soviet Union
- Citizenship: Soviet Union→Ukraine
- Born: May 5, 1962 (age 64) Omsk, Soviet Russia, Soviet Union
- Education: Odesa State Pedagogical Institute (1988)
- Occupation: Academic personnel

Sport
- Country: Soviet Union, Soviet Ukraine
- Sport: Track and field
- Middle-distance running: 800 m, 1500 m
- Club: Armed Forces
- Retired: 1988

Achievements and titles
- Personal bests: 800 m: 1:45.08 (1984, NR); 1:47.52i (1985); 1500 m: 3:38.11 (1984)
Medal record
European Indoor Championships
Bronze medal – third place	1985 Pireus	800 m
Soviet Championships
Gold medal – first place	1987 Bryansk	1500 m
Soviet Indoor Championships
Bronze medal – third place	1984 Moscow	800 m
Silver medal – second place	1985 Chișinău	800 m

Leonid Ivanovych Masunov (Ukrainian: Леонід Іванович Масунов, born 5 May 1962) is a retired Ukrainian middle-distance runner who represented Soviet Union at the 1985 European Athletics Indoor Championships in 800 and 1500 metres where he won a bronze medal in 800 metres. He also represented the Soviet Union at the 1987 World Championships in Athletics in 1500 metres.

In Soviet national competitions, Masunov represented Ukraine and won several medals at the national championships, both indoors and outdoors.

He is a current Ukrainian record holder in 800 metres (1:45.08) set in 1984 and held the indoor national record in the same event between 1985 and 2004.

After retirement, he worked as an athletics coach in Odesa (1990-1998).

Since 1998 he has been a teacher at the Odesa Regional Institute for Public Administration.

== Key international appearances ==
Year	Competition	Venue	Position	Event	Notes
1985	European Athletics Indoor Championships	(Greece) Pireus	3rd place, bronze medalist(s)	800 m	
1985	European Athletics Indoor Championships	(Greece) Pireus	h2	1500 m	DNF
1987	World Championships	(Italy) Rome	1sf8	1500 m	

Records
Preceded by Yevhen Arzhanov	Men's 800 metres Ukrainian Record Holder; 22 June 1984 – present	Incumbent
Preceded by	Men's 800 metres Ukrainian Indoor Record Holder; 2 March 1985 – 22 February 2004	Succeeded by Ivan Heshko
