= Masters M35 800 metres world record progression =

This is the progression of world record improvements of the 800 metres M35 division of Masters athletics.

Key

Incomplete information Pending

Hand	Auto	Athlete	Nationality	Birthdate	Age	Location	Date	Ref
	1:43.36	Johnny Gray	United States	19 June 1960	35 years, 58 days	Zürich	16 August 1995	
	1:46.88	Babacar Niang	Senegal	9 September 1958	36 years, 302 days	Limoges	8 July 1995	
1:49.2		George Scott	New Zealand	14.09.1936	Boise	12.05.1972		
1:51.7		Hubert Streit	Germany	26.09.1924	Berlin	23.07.1960		
