= Rob Harrison =

British athlete

Personal information
- Born: 5 June 1959 (age 67) Liverpool, England

Sport
- Sport: Athletics
- Events: 800 m, 1500 m
- Club: Liverpool Harriers
Medal record
Representing Great Britain
European Indoor Championships
Gold medal – first place	1985 Piraeus	800m
Summer Universiade
Silver medal – second place	1987 Zagreb	800m

Robert Neil Harrison (born 5 June 1959) is a male English former middle-distance runner.

== Biography ==
Harrison was a member of the Liverpool Harriers and finished second behind Steve Cram in the 800 metres event at the 1984 AAA Championships.

He is best known for winning the gold medal in the 800 metres at the 1985 European Indoor Championships. He represented England in the 1500 metres event, at the 1986 Commonwealth Games in Edinburgh, Scotland.

== International competitions ==
Year	Competition	Venue	Position	Event	Notes
Representing Great Britain and England
1985	European Indoor Championships	Piraeus, Greece	1st	800 m	1:49.09
1985	Universiade	Kobe, Japan	12th (sf)	800 m	1:47.99
1985	Universiade	Kobe, Japan	16th (h)	1500 m	3:47.01
1986	European Indoor Championships	Madrid, Spain	11th (h)	1500 m	3:48.95
1986	Commonwealth Games	Edinburgh, United Kingdom	4th	1500 m	3:54.44
1987	Universiade	Zagreb, Yugoslavia	2nd	1500 m	3:45.13
1990	European Indoor Championships	Glasgow, United Kingdom	8th	1500 m	3:53.29

== Personal bests ==
Outdoor

- 800 metres – 1:45.31 (Oslo 1984)
- 1000 metres – 2:17.20 (London 1984)
- 1500 metres – 3:35.74 (Cwmbran 1986)
- One mile – 3:53.85 (Nice 1986)

Indoor

- 800 metres – 1:47.72 (Piraeus 1985)
- 1500 metres – 3:42.95 (Cosford 1985)
- One mile – 3:59.35 (Cosford 1985)
