= Stanley Redwine =

American middle-distance runner

Personal information
- Born: April 10, 1961 (age 65)

Sport
- Sport: Track and field
Medal record
Representing United States
Pan American Games
Silver medal – second place	1983 Caracas	800m
Bronze medal – third place	1987 Indianapolis	800m

Stanley Redwine (born April 10, 1961) is a retired American middle-distance runner who matriculated at the University of Arkansas, and specialized in the 800 meters. He twice was the U.S. 800 meter national champion. He represented his country at three indoor World Championships finishing fourth each time. In addition, he won two bronze medals at the Pan American Games.

Redwine retired from competition in 1996, his 5th place at the Olympic Trials having failed to qualify for the Atlanta Olympics. He is the head coach at the University of Kansas where his men's and women's teams have won multiple conference championships. The 2013 women's team took the NCAA Outdoor Championships and he was named NCAA Women's Coach of the Year.

His personal bests (PR's) in the event are 1:44.87 outdoors (Oslo 1984) and 1:47.54 indoors (Budapest 1989). Other PR's were 400 meters in 46.07 (Austin, TX 1981), 500 meters indoors in 1:02.17 (East Rutherford, NJ 1983) and 1000 meters in 2:20.43 (Rieti, Italy 1988).

== Competition record ==
Year	Competition	Venue	Position	Event	Notes
Representing the United States
1983	Universiade	Edmonton, Canada	8th	800 m	1:50.98
1983	Pan American Games	Caracas, Venezuela	3rd	800 m	1:47.26
1986	Goodwill Games	Moscow, Soviet Union	2nd	800 m	1:46.89
1987	World Indoor Championships	Indianapolis, United States	4th	800 m	1:47.81
1987	Pan American Games	Indianapolis, United States	3rd	800 m	1:47.73
1987	World Championships	Rome, Italy	17th (qf)	800 m	1:46.25
1989	World Indoor Championships	Budapest, Hungary	4th	800 m	1:47.54
1991	World Indoor Championships	Seville, Spain	4th	800 m	1:47.98
1994	Goodwill Games	St. Petersburg, Russia	2nd	800 m	1:46.84
