= Kirillovo =

Kirillovo (Russian: Кириллово, see Kirill) may refer to:

- Kirillovo, Republic of Bashkortostan, Russia, a village
- Kirillovo, Sakhalin Oblast - see Political divisions of Karafuto Prefecture
- Kirillovo, Vologda Oblast, Russia, a village
