= Nixon Kiprotich =

Kenyan middle-distance runner

Personal information
- Born: December 4, 1962 (age 63)
Medal record
Men's athletics
Representing Kenya
Olympic Games
Silver medal – second place	1992 Barcelona	800 metres
African Championships
Gold medal – first place	1989 Lagos	800 m
Bronze medal – third place	1989 Lagos	1500 m

Nixon Kiprotich (born December 4, 1962, in Baringo) is a former Kenyan 800 metres runner, who won the silver medal at the 1992 Olympic Games. Previously, Kiprotich had come eighth in the 1988 Olympic final.

He finished 3rd at the 1989 IAAF World Cup 800 metres race. In 1989 he had won the African Championships and in 1990 he came second in the Commonwealth Games. During the summer of 1992 Kiprotich won several Grand Prix meetings where he defeated William Tanui to whom he lost in the Olympic final. Kiprotich was ranked No.1 in the world over 800m in 1993.
