= Ronny Olsson =

Swedish middle-distance runner

Personal information
- Born: 1 October 1961 (age 64) Malmö, Sweden

Sport
- Sport: Athletics
- Event(s): 800 m, 1500 m

Ronny Olsson (born 1 October 1961 in Malmö) is a retired Swedish middle-distance runner. He is best known for winning the silver medal in the 1500 metres at the 1988 European Indoor Championships. In addition, he represented his country at the 1983 World Championships without advancing from the first round.

== International competitions ==
Year	Competition	Venue	Position	Event	Notes
Representing Sweden
1983	World Championships	Helsinki, Finland	42nd (h)	800 m	1:49.72
1984	European Indoor Championships	Gothenburg, Sweden	5th	800 m	1:48.75
1984	Friendship Games	Moscow, Soviet Union	7th	800 m	1:48.07
1986	European Indoor Championships	Madrid, Spain	13th (h)	800 m	1:53.59
1986	European Championships	Stuttgart, West Germany	20th (h)	800 m	1:48.78
1986	European Championships	Stuttgart, West Germany	27th (h)	1500 m	3:50.17
1987	European Indoor Championships	Liévin, France	18th (h)	800 m	1:54.16
1988	European Indoor Championships	Budapest, Hungary	2nd	1500 m	3:46.16

== Personal bests ==
Outdoor

- 800 metres – 1:46.28 (Oslo 1984)
- 1500 metres – 3:39.66 (Malmö 1986)

Indoor

- 800 metres – 1:46.77 (Stuttgart 1987)
- 1000 metres – 2:21.18 (Sindelfingen 1989)
- 1500 metres – 3:40.35 (Stuttgart 1987)
