= Cheikh Tidiane Boye =

Senegalese middle-distance runner

Personal information
- Nationality: Senegalese
- Born: 10 August 1961 (age 64)

Sport
- Sport: Middle-distance running
- Event: 800 metres

Cheikh Tidiane Ameth Boye (born 10 August 1961) is a Senegalese middle-distance runner. He competed in the men's 800 metres at the 1988 Summer Olympics.
