= Davide Tirelli =

Italian athletics competitor

Personal information
- National team: Italy (22 caps from 1988 to 1996)
- Born: 12 August 1966 (age 60) Verona, Italy

Sport
- Sport: Athletics
- Event: 1500 metres

Achievements and titles
- Personal bests: 800 m: 1:47.14 (1993); 1500 m: 3:34.61 (1992)
Medal record
Representing Italy
Summer Universiade
Silver medal – second place	1991 Sheffield	800 m

Davide Tirelli (born 12 August 1966) is a retired Italian middle-distance runner who specialised in the 1500 metres. He represented his country at one outdoor and one indoor World Championships. In addition, he won a silver medal at the 1991 Summer Universiade.

== International competitions ==
Year	Competition	Venue	Position	Event	Notes
Representing Italy
1989	Universiade	Duisburg, West Germany	19th (h)	1500 m	3:49.53
1990	European Indoor Championships	Glasgow, United Kingdom	11th (h)	1500 m	3:48.68
1990	Goodwill Games	Seattle, United States	6th	1500 m	3:41.58
1990	European Championships	Split, Yugoslavia	20th (h)	1500 m	3:43.76
1991	World Indoor Championships	Seville, Spain	16th (h)	1500 m	3:47.63
1991	Mediterranean Games	Athens, Greece	5th	1500 m	3:43.37
1991	Universiade	Sheffield, United Kingdom	2nd	1500 m	3:50.79
1991	World Championships	Tokyo, Japan	18th (sf)	1500 m	3:43.08
1993	Mediterranean Games	Narbonne, France	5th	1500 m	3:38.41
1994	European Championships	Helsinki, Finland	20th (h)	1500 m	3:42.03

== Personal bests ==
Outdoor

- 800 metres – 1:47.14 (Cagliari 1993)
- 1000 metres – 2:18.07 (Parma 1993)
- 1500 metres – 3:34.61 (Nice 1992)
- 3000 metres – 7:56.79 (Trento 1990)
- Half marathon – 1:06:18 (Fusignano 2002)

Indoor

- 1500 metres – 3:47.63 (Seville 1991)
