= Ibrahim Okash =

Somali athlete (b. 1964)

Personal information
- Born: 18 September 1964 (age 61) Jowhar, Somalia

Sport
- Sport: Middle-distance running

Ibrahim Okash Omar (born 18 September 1964) is a former athlete who competed internationally for Somalia. He competed at the 1984 Summer Olympics and the 1988 Summer Olympics.

Okash was raised in Jowhar, about 25 miles from Mogadishu.

At the 1984 Games he competed in the 400 metres and finished 7th in his heat and did not advance any further. At the 1988 Summer Olympics, he advanced to the semifinals of the 800 metres. He finished eighth in the semifinals.

He competed for the University of Southern California in 1988 and 1989. Okash also competed for the George Mason Patriots track and field team. In 1988, while at USC, Okash set a Pac-12 record of 1:33:92 in the 800 metres. As of 2021, Okash still held the Pac-12 record. He also ranks second in USC history with a time of 3:40:86 in the 1,500 meters.

He was later affiliated with the Santa Monica Track Club.
