= Ryszard Ostrowski =

Polish middle-distance runner (born 1961)

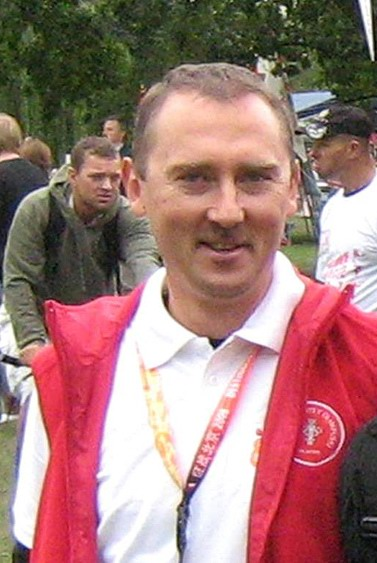
- Ryszard Ostrowski in 2007

Personal information
- Born: 6 February 1961 (age 65) Poznań, Poland

Sport
- Sport: Track and field
Medal record
Representing Poland
Summer Universiade
Gold medal – first place	1983 Edmonton	800m
Gold medal – first place	1985 Kobe	800m

Ryszard Ostrowski (born 6 February 1961) is a retired Polish middle-distance runner who specialized in the 800 metres.

He was born in Poznań, and represented the club Olimpia Poznań. He won the 800 metres at the 1983 Summer Universiade and the 1985 Summer Universiade. In 1984 he tied for the victory, together with Alberto Juantorena, at the Friendship Games.

He finished fifth at the 1986 European Championships, fourth at the 1986 Goodwill Games, and the 1987 World Championships. At the 1988 Summer Olympics he reached the quarter-finals of the 800 metres. He competed at the 1990 European Championships without reaching the final. He became Polish champion in 1982, 1983, 1984 and 1987, and became Polish indoor champion in 1991 and 1994.

His personal best time was 1:44.38 minutes, achieved in September 1985 in Kobe.

His son, Artur, was also a middle-distance runner.

== Competitions record ==
Year	Competition	Venue	Position	Event	Notes
Representing Poland
1981	Universiade	Bucharest, Romania	15th (sf)	800 m	1:50.58
1983	Universiade	Edmonton, Canada	1st	800 m	1:46.29
1984	Friendship Games	Moscow, Soviet Union	1st=	800 m	1:45.68
1985	Universiade	Kobe, Japan	1st	800 m	1:44.38 (NR)
1986	Goodwill Games	Moscow, Soviet Union	4th	800 m	1:47.25
1986	European Championships	Stuttgart, West Germany	5th	800 m	1:45.54
1987	World Championships	Rome, Italy	4th	800 m	1:44.59
1988	Olympic Games	Seoul, South Korea	26th (qf)	800 m	1:47.72
1990	European Championships	Split, Yugoslavia	12th (sf)	800 m	1:48.22
