= Donato Sabia =

Italian middle-distance runner (1963–2020)

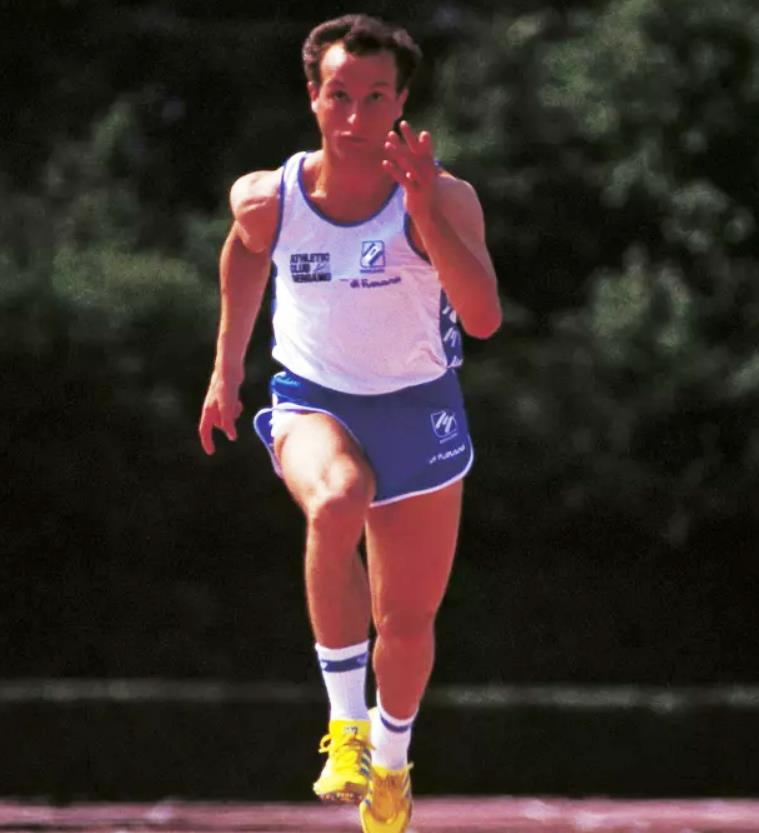

Personal information
- National team: Italy: 17 caps (1982-1988)
- Born: 11 September 1963 Potenza, Italy
- Died: 7 April 2020 (aged 56) Potenza, Italy
- Height: 1.78 m (5 ft 10 in)
- Weight: 65 kg (143 lb)

Sport
- Sport: Athletics
- Events: 400 metres 800 metres
- Club: Pro Patria Milano

Achievements and titles
- Personal bests: 400 m: 45.73 (1984); 800 m: 1:43.88 (1984)
Medal record
Event	1st	2nd	3rd
European Indoor Championships	1	0	0
Mediterranean Games	0	1	0

Donato Sabia (11 September 1963 – 7 April 2020) was an Italian middle-distance runner who specialized in the 800 metres.

== Biography ==
Donato Sabia was born in Potenza and won two medals, at senior level, at the International athletics competitions, one of these with national relay team. He participated at two editions of the Summer Olympics (1984, 1988), reaching, in both cases, the Olympic 800 metres final; he had 17 caps in national team from 1982 to 1988.

His personal best time was 1:43.88 minutes, achieved in June 1984 in Florence. In the 400 metres he had 45.73 seconds, achieved in June 1984 in Milan.

Donato Sabia died on 7 April 2020, in San Carlo Hospital, in Potenza, from COVID-19, having on 31 March 2020 also lost his father to the same disease. He was 56.

== Achievements ==
Year	Competition	Venue	Result	Event	time	Notes
1983	Mediterranean Games	Casablanca, Morocco	2nd	4 × 400 m relay	3:04.54	
1983	World Championships	Helsinki, Finland	5th	4 × 400 m relay	3:05.10	
1984	European Indoor Championships	Gothenburg, Sweden	1st	800 m	1:48.05	
1984	Olympic Games	Los Angeles, United States	5th	800 m	1:44.53	
1988	Olympic Games	Seoul, South Korea	7th	800 m	1:48.03	

== National titles ==
Sabia won six individual national championships.

- 1 win in the 400 metres (1984)
- 3 wins in the 800 metres (1983, 1984, 1988)
- 2 wins in the 400 metres indoor (1983, 1988)

== See also ==
- Italian all-time lists - 800 metres
- Italy national relay team
