= Porfirio Méndez =

Paraguayan middle-distance runner (1966–2017)

Personal information
- Nationality: Paraguayan
- Born: 18 April 1966
- Died: 24 January 2017 (aged 50)

Sport
- Sport: Middle-distance running
- Event: 800 metres

Porfirio Méndez (18 April 1966 – 24 January 2017) was a Paraguayan middle-distance runner. He competed in the men's 800 metres at the 1988 Summer Olympics. He died of a heart attack while running.
