= Mohamed Alouini =

Tunisian Olympic middle-distance runner (born 1957)

Personal information
- Nationality: Tunisian
- Born: 19 October 1957 (age 68) Tunisia
- Height: 183 cm (6 ft 0 in)
- Weight: 70 kg (154 lb)

Sport
- Country: Tunisia
- Sport: Middle-distance running
Medal record
Representing Tunisia
Summer Universiade
Bronze medal – third place	1983 Edmonton	800m

Mohamed Alouini is a Tunisian Olympic middle-distance runner. He represented his country in the men's 1500 meters and the men's 800 meters at the 1984 Summer Olympics. His time was a 3:49.78 in the 1500, and a 1:47.20/1:45.78 in the 800 heats/semifinals.
