= Kirillovo, Vologda Oblast =

Kirillovo Кириллово
- Village
- Location within Vologda Oblast Location within Russia
- Coordinates: 60°10′N 43°46′E
- Country: Russia
- Region: Vologda Oblast
- District: Nyuksensky District
- Time zone: UTC+3:00

Kirillovo (Russian: Кириллово) is a rural locality (a village) in Igmasskoye Rural Settlement, Nyuksensky District, Vologda Oblast, Russia. The population was 5 as of 2002.

== Geography ==
Kirillovo is located 44 km southwest of Nyuksenitsa (the district's administrative centre) by road. Igmas is the nearest rural locality.
