= Faouzi Lahbi =

Moroccan middle-distance runner

Medal record

Men's athletics

World Indoor Championships
Bronze medal – third place	1987 Indianapolis	800 m

Faouzi Lahbi (born 2 March 1960) is a retired Moroccan middle distance runner who specialized in the 800 metres.

He competed at the 1983 World Championships, and at the 1984 Olympics he competed in both 800 metres and 1500 metres. He won the bronze medal at the 1987 World Indoor Championships. He went on to finish fifth in the final at the 1987 World Championships and also competed at the 1988 Olympic Games. On the regional level he won the silver medal at the 1983 Mediterranean Games and the gold medal at the 1987 Mediterranean Games, and the silver medal at the 1989 Jeux de la Francophonie.

His personal best times were 1.44.66 minutes in the 800 metres, achieved in August 1986 in Koblenz; and 2.17.90 minutes in the 1000 metres, achieved in August 1982 in Köln.
