= Soviet Indoor Athletics Championships =

Annual track and field competition

- Sport: Indoor track and field
- Founded: 1949
- Ceased: 1991
- Country: Soviet Union

The Soviet Indoor Athletics Championships (Russian: Чемпионат СССР по лёгкой атлетике в помещении) was an annual indoor track and field competition organised by the Soviet Athletics Federation, which served as the Soviet national championship for the sport. Typically held over two to three days in February during the Soviet winter, it was a later development to the national programme, supplementing the main outdoor Soviet Athletics Championships held in the summer.

== History ==
Indoor athletics at a national level began to take shape in the Soviet Union from 1940 onwards, in the form of winter indoor matches between teams from Moscow and Leningrad, then expanding to cities including Kiev, Kharkov, and Odessa. The early history of event is linked to that of the All-Union Winter Competitions (Russian: Всесоюзные зимние соревнования), which were first held in 1949 and included outdoor throwing events and racewalking.

The event took the form of an indoor track and field championship in 1971 and a total of 22 athletics events (12 for men, 10 for women) were contested. The competition also featured a team element, with athletes' performances counting towards a points total for the Soviet Republic or major city that they represented. By the end of the competition's history, a total of 28 events (15 by men, 13 by women) were contested, with pole vault and steeplechase being the only events to remain for men only. With the exception of the indoor steeplechase, in its later years the championships programme roughly aligned with that of the IAAF World Indoor Championships (first held in 1987).

The last Soviet Indoor Athletics Championships was hosted in Volgograd in 1991 and it ceased thereafter due to the dissolution of the Soviet Union. A final shared championships was held in 1992 between the Commonwealth of Independent States, after which point the newly independent nations hosted their own national championship events.

== Events ==
The following athletics events featured as standard on the main Soviet Indoor Championships programme:

- Sprint: 60 m, 200 m, 400 m
- Distance track events: 800 m, 1500 m, 3000 m, 5000 m
- Hurdles: 60 m hurdles
- Jumps: long jump, triple jump, high jump, pole vault (men only)
- Throws: shot put

Indoor versions of the 110 metres hurdles and 100 metres hurdles were held at the first three editions, before being dropped. Men and women also competed over 100 metres in 1972 and 1973. Races over 600 metres were contested by men and women in the first two editions, then 1000 metres in 1973, before the events were standardised to the international class 800 m and 1500 m. A one-off men's weight throw was also held in 1975. The 1976 programme had a one-off change, dropping the 400 m in favour of men's and women's 300 m and 600 m races. Women's 3000 m race were held between 1975 and 1977. The 100 m sprint and 110/100 hurdles were also reintroduced between 1978 and 1980. The 200 metres for men and women began in 1982, as did a women's 3000 metres, and a women's triple jump was introduced at the final edition in 1991.

The 1977 championships featured the 10,000 metres race walk for the first time. A women's race walk over 5000 m was first held in 1981, but both walks were dropped in 1982. The walks returned with 5000 m and 3000 m races for men and women, respectively, in 1989 and remained present until 1991.

The steeplechase had a very varied history at the competition, given limitations at the scheduled venue. It was contested by men only, as the event was not regularly contested by women during this period. A men's 2000 metres steeplechase was added to the programme in 1978. It was extended to the standard 3000 m distance in 1982, reinstated over 2000 m for 1985 and 1986, returned to 3000 m in 1987, 1990 and 1991, and dropped at the 1984, 1988 and 1989 editions.

Combined track and field events were held jointly at early editions of the competitions. A men's pentathlon and women's triathlon were held in 1975, and then moved to the international standard of men's heptathlon and women's pentathlon in 1977. The Soviet Combined Events Championships were contested separately from 1978 onwards. Variations were made at some editions, with women competing in six events in 1982 and 1984, and men competing in an octathlon in 1984, 1988 and 1989.

== Editions ==
#	Year	Venue	Date	Stadium	Notes
	1949				
	1950				
	1951				
	1952				
	1953				
	1954				
	1955				
	1956				
	1957				
	1958				
	1959				
	1960				
	1961				
	1962				
	1963				
	1964				
	1965				
	1966				
	1967				
	1968				
	1969				
	1970				
	1971	Moscow	27–28 February	Spartak Winter Stadium	
	1972	Moscow	24–27 February	Spartak Winter Stadium	
	1973	Moscow	1–4 March	Spartak Winter Stadium	
	1974	Moscow	13–15 February	Spartak Winter Stadium	
	1975	Leningrad	18–19 February	Leningrad Winter Stadium	
	1976	Moscow	1–2 February	Spartak Winter Stadium	
	1977	Minsk	19–20 February	Belorussian Military District Indoor Arena	
	1978	Moscow	1–3 March	Spartak Winter Stadium	
	1979	Minsk	10–12 February	Belorussian Military District Indoor Arena	
	1980	Moscow	14–16 February	Spartak Winter Stadium	
	1981	Minsk	6–8 February	Belorussian Military District Indoor Arena	
	1982	Moscow	19–21 February	Krylatskoye Sports Complex Velodrome	
	1983	Moscow	18–20 February	Krylatskoye Sports Complex Velodrome	
	1984	Moscow	17–19 February	Krylatskoye Sports Complex Velodrome	
	1985	Chișinău	15–17 February	Chișinău Indoor Stadium	
	1986	Moscow	6–8 February	CSKA Palace of Sports	
	1987	Penza	6–8 February	Rubin Sports Palace	
	1988	Volgograd	10–12 February	Volgograd State Academy of Physical Culture Arena	
	1989	Gomel	3–5 February	Dynamo Arena	
	1990	Chelyabinsk	3–4 February	Ural State University of Physical Culture Arena	
	1991	Volgograd	9–10 February	Volgograd State Academy of Physical Culture Arena	

== See also ==
- List of Soviet records in athletics
