= Mohamed Hossain Milzer =

Bangladeshi sprinter

Personal information
- Nationality: Bangladeshi
- Born: 11 February 1967 (age 59)

Sport
- Sport: Sprinting
- Event: 400 metres

Mohamed Hossain Milzer (born 11 February 1967) is a Bangladeshi sprinter. He competed in the men's 400 metres at the 1988 Summer Olympics.
