= Athletics at the Friendship Games =

- Dates: August 16, 1984 – August 18, 1984
- Host city: Moscow, Soviet Union (men); Prague, Czechoslovakia (women)
- Venue: Grand Arena of the Central Lenin Stadium (men); Evžen Rošický Stadium (women)
- Level: Senior
- Events: 41
- Participation: 529 athletes from 39 nations

Athletics at the Friendship Games was contested in 41 events, 24 events by men and 17 by women. Men competed at the Grand Arena of the Central Lenin Stadium (now Luzhniki Stadium) in Moscow, Soviet Union between 17 and 18 August, while women's events took place at the Evžen Rošický Stadium in Prague, Czechoslovakia between 16 and 18 August 1984.

One new world record was set, by East German Irina Meszynski in women's discus throw, with 73.36 m. As of 2024, it still ranks Meszynski sixth on the world all-time list.

In an unusual feat, Alberto Juantorena (Cuba) and Ryszard Ostrowski (Poland) both crossed the finish line at exactly the same moment in the men's 800 metres. After the officials were unable to split them using a photo-finish, both were declared gold medalists.

The Soviet Union dominated the final medal tally, winning 24 gold and 63 total medals. East Germany finished second, with 8 and 19 respectively.

== Medal summary ==
=== Men ===
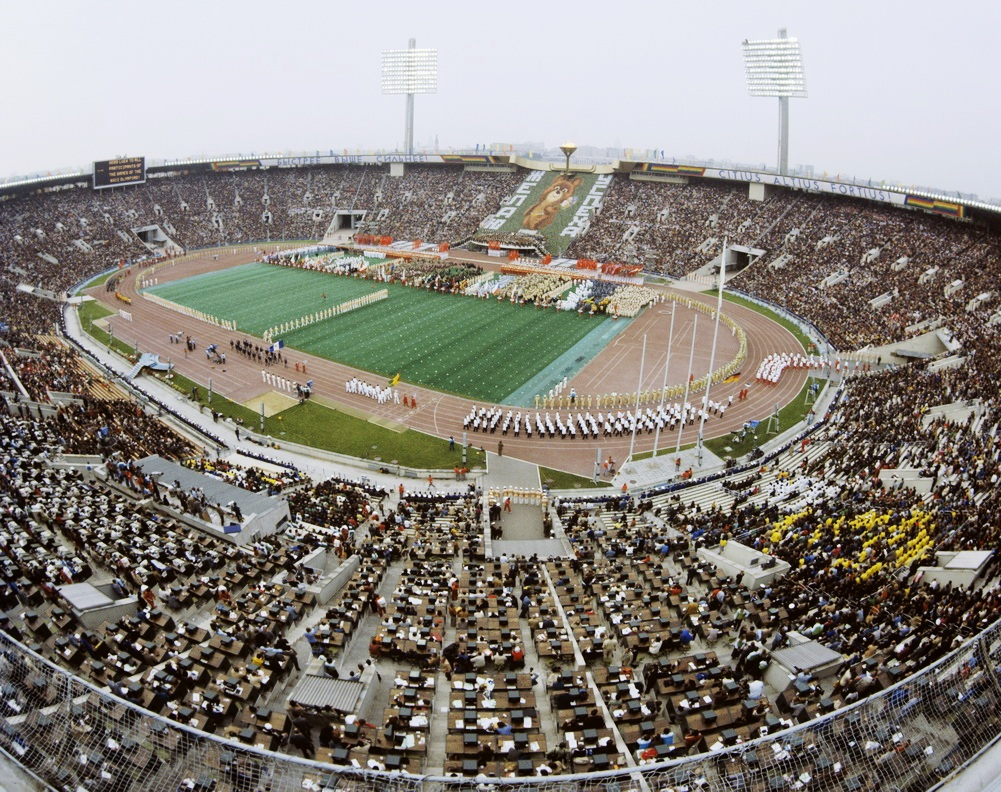
Host stadium of men's events (shown in 1980)

Event	Gold		Silver		Bronze	
100 metres (wind: -0.4 m/s)	Osvaldo Lara (CUB)	10.17	Attila Kovács (HUN)	10.18	Leandro Peñalver (CUB)	10.21
200 metres (wind: -1.2 m/s)	Vladimir Muravyov (URS)	20.34	Aleksandr Yevgenyev (URS)	20.41	Olaf Prenzler (GDR)	20.58
400 metres	Viktor Markin (URS)	44.78	Aleksandr Troshchilo (URS)	45.51	Aleksandr Kurochkin (URS)	45.57
800 metres	Alberto Juantorena (CUB); Ryszard Ostrowski (POL)	1:45.68	none awarded	–	Viktor Kalinkin (URS)	1:45.82
1500 metres	Andreas Busse (GDR)	3:36.65	Anatoliy Kalutskiy (URS)	3:37.35	Igor Lotaryov (URS)	3:38.42
5000 metres	Evgeni Ignatov (BUL)	13:26.35	Dmitriy Dmitriyev (URS)	13:26.85	Wodajo Bulti (ETH)	13:29.08
10,000 metres	Valeriy Abramov (URS)	27:55.16	Wodajo Bulti (ETH)	27:58.97	Bekele Debele (ETH)	28:03.06
Marathon	Dereje Nedi (ETH)	2:10:32	Abebe Mekonnen (ETH)	2:11:30	Lee Jong-hyong (PRK)	2:11:44
110 metres hurdles (wind: -0.5 m/s)	György Bakos (HUN)	13.52	Vyacheslav Ustinov (URS)	13.57	Thomas Munkelt (GDR)	13.64
400 metres hurdles	Aleksandr Vasilyev (URS)	48.63	Vladimir Budko (URS)	48.74	Toma Tomov (BUL)	49.29
3000 metres steeplechase	Bogusław Mamiński (POL)	8:27.15	Hagen Melzer (GDR)	8:27.43	Jan Hagelbrandt (SWE)	8:32.36
4 × 100 metres relay	Soviet Union (URS); Aleksandr Yevgenyev; Sergey Sokolov; Vladimir Muravyov; Nikolay Sidorov	38.32	Cuba (CUB); Tomás González; Leandro Peñalver; Silvio Leonard; Osvaldo Lara	38.79	Poland (POL); Krzysztof Zwoliński; Marian Woronin; Czesław Prądzyński; Arkadiusz Janiak	38.81
4 × 400 metres relay	Soviet Union (URS); Sergey Lovachev; Yevgeniy Lomtev; Aleksandr Kurochkin; Viktor Markin	3:00.16	East Germany (GDR); Carlo Niestädt; Mathias Schersing; Thomas Schönlebe; Jens Carlowitz	3:00.47	Cuba (CUB); Lázaro Martínez; Carlos Reyte; Roberto Ramos; Alberto Juantorena	3:04.76
20 kilometres walk	Sergey Protsishin (URS)	1:21:57	Anatoliy Solomin (URS)	1:22:21	Nikolay Polozov (URS)	1:22:40
50 kilometres walk	Andrey Perlov (URS)	3:43:06	Pavol Szikora (TCH)	3:45:53	Viktor Dorovskikh (URS)	3:58:47
High jump	Valeriy Sereda (URS)	2.25 m	Javier Sotomayor (CUB)	2.25 m	Dariusz Zielke (POL)	2.20 m
Pole vault	Konstantin Volkov (URS)	5.80 m	Sergey Bubka (URS)	5.70 m	Aleksandr Krupskiy (URS)	5.70 m
Long jump	Konstantin Semykin (URS)	8.38 m	Jaime Jefferson (CUB)	8.37 m	Sergey Layevskiy (URS)	8.22 m
Triple jump	Oleg Protsenko (URS)	17.46 m	Aleksandr Yakovlev (URS)	17.41 m	Khristo Markov (BUL)	17.29 m
Shot put	Sergey Kasnauskas (URS)	21.64 m	Udo Beyer (GDR)	21.60 m	Vladimir Kiselyov (URS)	21.58 m
Discus throw	Yuriy Dumchev (URS)	66.70 m	Juan Martínez (CUB)	66.04 m	Jürgen Schult (GDR)	66.02 m
Hammer throw	Yuriy Sedykh (URS)	85.60 m	Igor Nikulin (URS)	82.56 m	Sergey Litvinov (URS)	81.30 m
Javelin throw	Uwe Hohn (GDR)	94.44 m	Detlef Michel (GDR)	88.32 m	Zdeněk Adamec (TCH)	87.10 m
Decathlon	Grigoriy Degtyaryev (URS)	8523	Torsten Voss (GDR)	8450	Igor Sobolevskiy (URS)	8433

=== Women ===
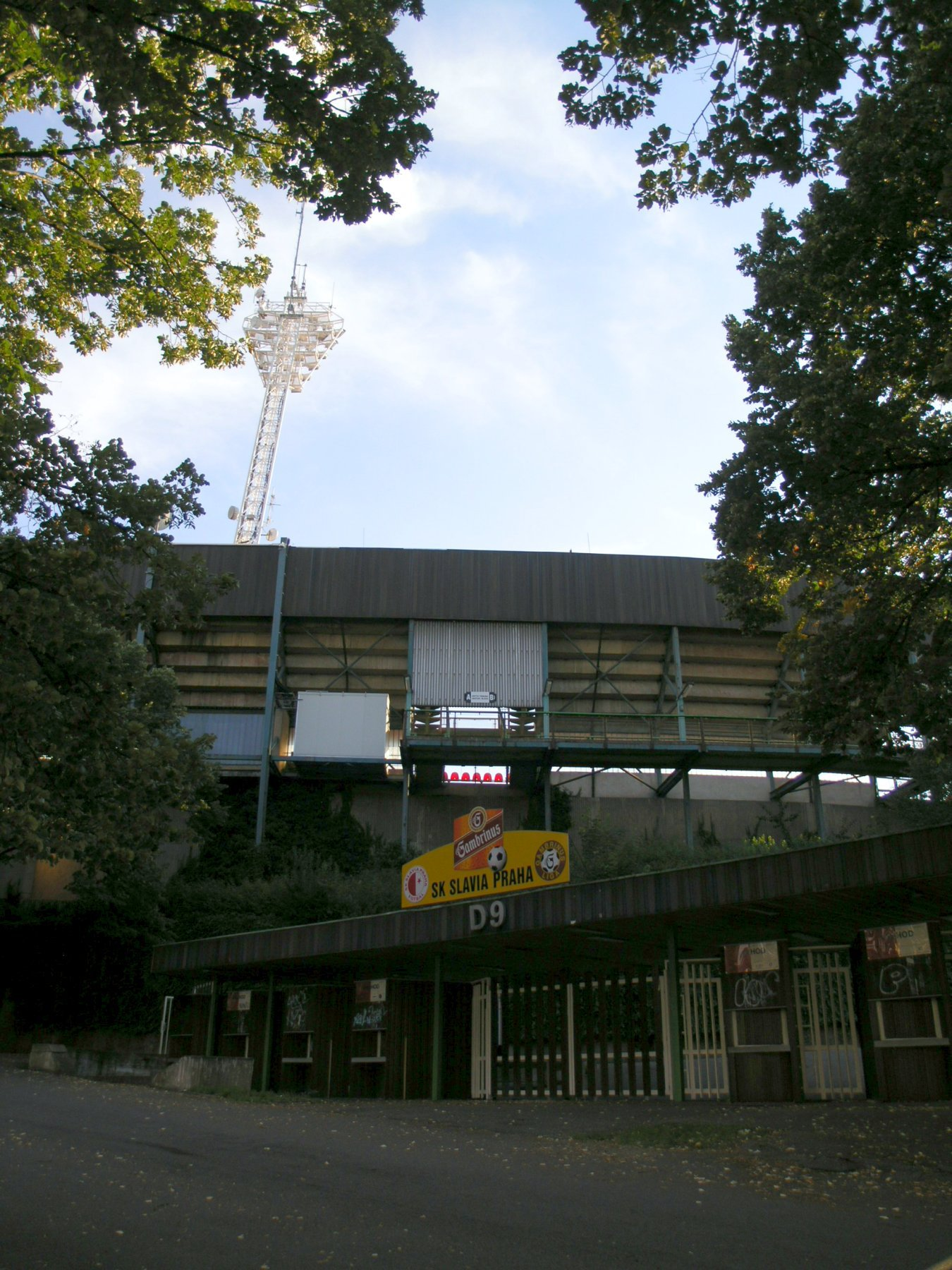
Host stadium of women's events (shown in 2007)

Event	Gold		Silver		Bronze	
100 metres (wind: -0.2 m/s)	Marlies Göhr (GDR)	10.95	Lyudmila Kondratyeva (URS)	11.02	Anelia Nuneva (BUL)	11.10
200 metres (wind: -0.3 m/s)	Bärbel Wöckel (GDR)	22.15	Svetlana Zhizdrikova (URS)	22.75	Nadezhda Georgieva (BUL)	22.79
400 metres	Marita Koch (GDR)	48.16	Taťána Kocembová (TCH)	48.73	Olga Vladykina (URS)	49.52
800 metres	Irina Podyalovskaya (URS)	1:57.31	Zuzana Moravčíková (TCH)	1:58.06	Nadiya Olizarenko (URS)	1:58.10
1500 metres	Nadezhda Ralldugina (URS)	3:56.63	Ravilya Agletdinova (URS)	3:58.70	Yekaterina Podkopayeva (URS)	4:01.61
3000 metres	Tatyana Kazankina (URS)	8:33.01	Natalya Artyomova (URS)	8:40.53	Olga Bondarenko (URS)	8:43.74
100 metres hurdles (wind: -0.2 m/s)	Yordanka Donkova (BUL)	12.55	Sabine Paetz (GDR)	12.60	Lucyna Kałek (POL)	12.61
400 metres hurdles	Marina Stepanova (URS)	53.67	Yekaterina Grun (URS)	54.42	Margarita Ponomaryova (URS)	54.65
Marathon	Zoya Ivanova (URS)	2:33:44	Lucia Belyayeva (URS)	2:33:54	Raisa Smekhnova (URS)	2:33:59
4 × 100 metres relay	Bulgaria (BUL); Pepa Pavlova; Anelia Nuneva; Nadezhda Georgieva; Liliyana Ivanova	42.62	Soviet Union (URS); Lyudmila Kondratyeva; Maia Azarashvili; Svetlana Zhizdrikova; Olga Antonova	42.71	Czechoslovakia (TCH); Eva Murková; Taťána Kocembová; Renata Černochová; Jarmila Kratochvílová	43.21
4 × 400 metres relay	Soviet Union (URS); Irina Baskakova; Irina Nazarova; Mariya Pinigina; Olga Bryzgina	3:19.12	Czechoslovakia (TCH); Alena Bulířová; Zuzana Moravčíková; Jarmila Kratochvílová; Taťána Kocembová	3:21.89	Bulgaria (BUL); Galina Penkova; Katia Ilieva; Radostina Shtereva; Rositsa Stamenova	3:28.34
High jump	Lyudmila Andonova (BUL)	1.96 m	Lyudmila Butuzova (URS)	1.96 m	Tamara Bykova (URS)	1.96 m
Long jump	Heike Drechsler (GDR)	7.15 m	Helga Radtke (GDR)	7.11 m	Galina Chistyakova (URS)	7.11 m
Shot put	Natalya Lisovskaya (URS)	21.96 m	Helena Fibingerová (TCH)	21.33 m	Nunu Abashidze (URS)	21.18 m
Discus throw	Irina Meszynski (GDR)	73.36 m (WR)	Galina Murašova (URS)	72.14 m	Zdenka Šilhavá (TCH)	70.14 m
Javelin throw	Petra Felke (GDR)	73.30 m	Antoaneta Todorova (BUL)	65.40 m	María Caridad Colón (CUB)	64.34 m
Heptathlon	Natalya Gracheva (URS)	6477	Nadezhda Vinogradova (URS)	6357	Heike Tischler (GDR)	6290

== World records broken ==
1 new world record was set.

Event	Name	Nationality	Result
Women's discus throw	Irina Meszynski	East Germany	73.36 m

== Medal table ==
* Host nation (Host nations (Czechoslovakia and the Soviet Union))

Rank	Nation	Gold	Silver	Bronze	Total
1	Soviet Union (URS)*	24	20	19	63
2	East Germany (GDR)	8	7	4	19
3	Bulgaria (BUL)	4	1	5	10
4	Cuba (CUB)	3	3	3	9
5	Poland (POL)	2	0	3	5
6	Ethiopia (ETH)	1	2	2	5
7	Hungary (HUN)	1	1	0	2
8	Czechoslovakia (TCH)*	0	5	3	8
9	North Korea (PRK)	0	0	1	1
9	Sweden (SWE)	0	0	1	1
Totals (10 entries)		43	39	41	123

== Participating nations ==
- Algeria (4)
- Argentina (3)
- Austria (8)
- Belgium (2)
- Benin (5)
- Bulgaria (49)
- Cambodia (11)
- Cape Verde (2)
- Colombia (5)
- Cuba (35)
- Czechoslovakia (65)
- East Germany (48)
- Ethiopia (10)
- Finland (4)
- France (1)
- Guinea (7)
- Guinea-Bissau (4)
- Great Britain (5)
- Hungary (28)
- Italy (5)
- Lebanon (5)
- Madagascar (2)
- Malaysia (6)
- Mongolia (3)
- Nicaragua (2)
- North Korea (3)
- Peru (4)
- Poland (43)
- Portugal (2)
- Seychelles (3)
- South Yemen (9)
- Soviet Union (131)
- Sweden (3)
- Switzerland (4)
- Syria (2)
- Tanzania (2)
- United States (1)
- Vietnam (2)
- West Germany (1)

== See also ==
- Athletics at the 1984 Summer Olympics
