= Alberto Barsotti =

Italian middle-distance runner

Personal information
- National team: Italy: 23 caps (1983–1992)
- Born: 29 February 1964 (age 62) La Rotta, Italy

Sport
- Sport: Athletics
- Event: 800 metres
- Club: Pro Patria (until 1985); Fiamme Oro (since 1986)
- Retired: 1992

Achievements and titles
- Personal best: 800 m: 1:46.33 (1990)
Medal record
Athletics Junior Championships
Bronze medal – third place	1983 Schwechat	800 m

Alberto Barsotti (born 29 February 1964) is a former Italian middle-distance runner.

== Career ==
At the end of 2020 outdoor season his personal best 1:46.33 in 800 m, ran in 1990, is still the 10th Italian best performance of all-time.

== Achievements ==
Year	Competition	Venue	Rank	Event	Time	Notes
1986	European Championships	(West Germany) Stuttgart	Heats	800 m	1:48.53	
1990	European Championships	(Socialist Federal Republic of Yugoslavia) Slpit	Semifinals	800 m	1:48.13	

== National titles ==
Barsotti won three national championships at individual senior level.

- Italian Athletics Championships
  - 800 m: 1985, 1986
- Italian Athletics Indoor Championships
  - 800 m: 1995

== See also ==
- Italian all-time top lists – 800 metres
- Italian national track relay team
- Italy at the Military World Games
