= Syed Meesaq Rizvi =

Pakistani athletics competitor

Personal information
- Born: January 23, 1962 (age 64) Lahore, Pakistan

Sport
- Sport: Track and field

Syed Meesaq Rizvi (born January 23, 1962) is a former Pakistani athlete who specialized in sprint and middle-distance events, representing Pakistan in the 400 metres and 800 metres at the 1984 Summer Olympics in Los Angeles, and again in the 800 metres at the 1988 Summer Olympics in Seoul.

== Biography ==
Rizvi was educated at the Habib Public School in Karachi and the Government College in Lahore and qualified as a medical doctor specializing in sports medicine. He has also served with the Pakistan Cricket Board on their medical commission and was in the news due to his work in tackling fitness problems faced by fast bowler Shoaib Akhtar. Rizvi now runs a fitness centre in Lahore.

Rizvi came to the limelight when he earned a bronze medal in the 800 meters event at the National Athletics Championship in Peshawar in 1982. One year later, at the same competition in Hyderabad he finished second in the same event and placed third in the event in Faisalabad in 1984.

At the 1984 Summer Olympics Rizvi ran the 400 meters in 49.58 seconds in his heat, finishing seventh and last. In his 800 meters heat, he ended with a time of 1:51.29 minutes which placed him fifth out of seven runners. At the first South Asian Federation (SAF) Games in Kathmandu that year, he competed in the 1,500 meters race but finished sixth. At the National Athletics Championship in Islamabad in 1985 he was second in the 800 metres and finally won a gold medal in the 400 meters event at the Nationals in Rawalpindi in 1987 with a time of 53.32 seconds.

Rizvi won a silver medal as part of Pakistan's 4×400 meters relay quartet at the SAF Games in Dhaka in 1985. He ran it in 1:49.60 minutes but still got a silver medal in 800 meters in an International Meet in Delhi 1987. He represented Pakistan at the 2nd IAAF World Championships in Rome in 1987, but did not start in his first round heat 6 in the 800 meters event.

At the 1988 Summer Olympics Rizvi took part only in the 800 metres race. He ended sixth out of eight in his heat with a time of 1:51.58. Overall, he was ranked 50th out of a total of 70 participants.
