= Rob Druppers =

Dutch middle-distance runner

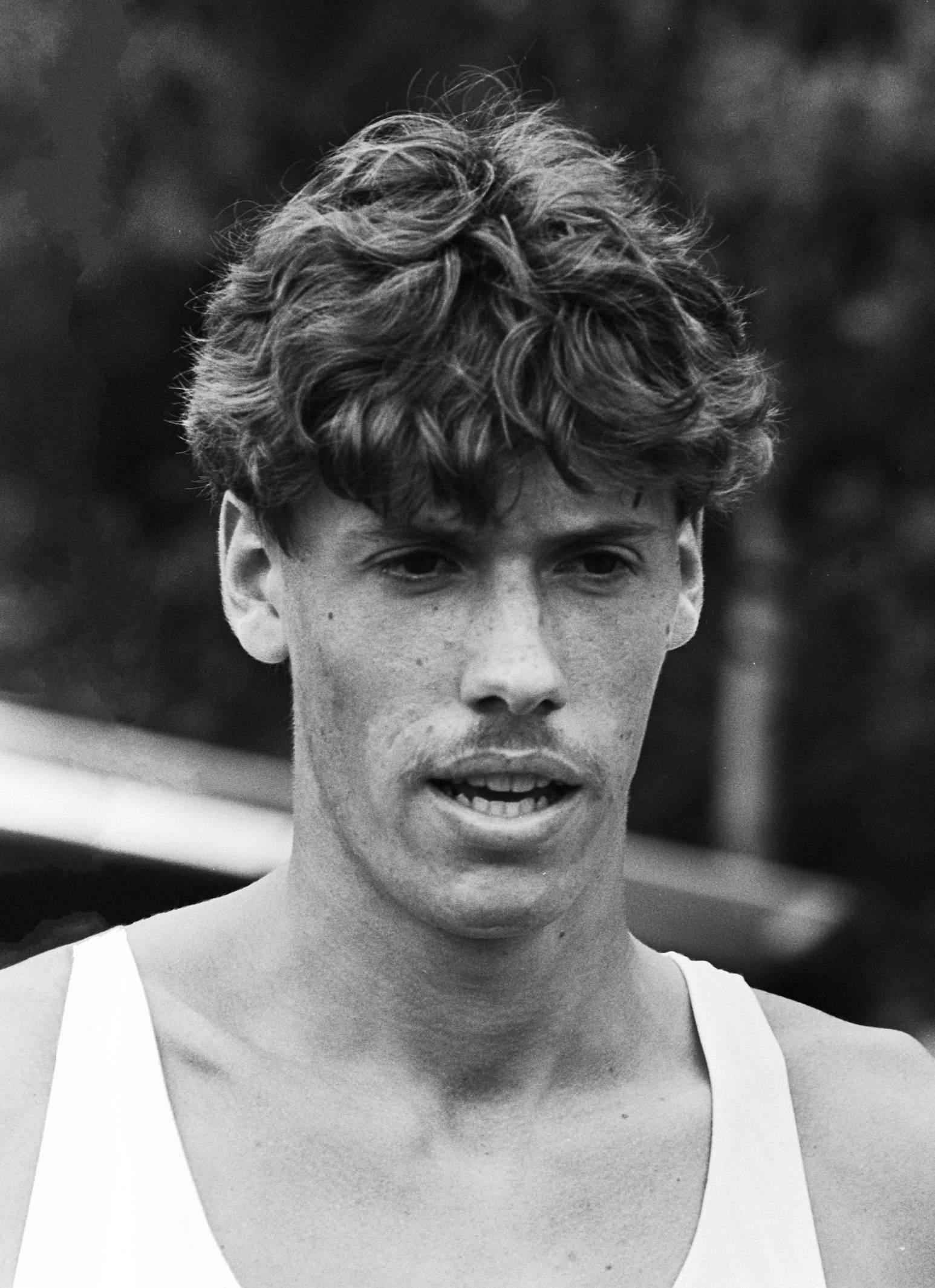
- Druppers in 1983

Personal information
- Born: 29 April 1962 (age 64) Utrecht, Netherlands
- Height: 1.86 m (6 ft 1 in)
- Weight: 70 kg (154 lb)

Sport
- Country: Netherlands
- Sport: Middle-distance running
- Club: Hercules, Dordrecht
Medal record
World Championships
Silver medal – second place	1983 Helsinki	800 m
European Indoor Championships
Gold medal – first place	1987 Liévin	800 m
Silver medal – second place	1988 Budapest	800 m
Silver medal – second place	1989 The Hague	800 m

Robertus Johannes Druppers (born 29 April 1962) is a Dutch former middle-distance runner who won the silver medal in the 800 m event at the 1983 World Championships. He set a Dutch 800 m record at 1:43.56 in Cologne in 1985, and a 1000 m record of 2:15.23 in his home town Utrecht in the same year. Druppers competed at the 1988 Summer Olympics, where he was eliminated in the quarterfinals of the 800 m.

== Competition record ==
Year	Competition	Venue	Position	Event	Notes
Representing the Netherlands
1982	European Championships	Athens, Greece	5th	800 m	1:47.06
1983	European Indoor Championships	Budapest, Hungary	semi-final (dnf)	800 m	1:49.28 (heat)
1983	World Championships	Helsinki, Finland	2nd	800 m	1:44.20
1986	European Championships	Stuttgart, West Germany	4th	800 m	1:45.53
1987	European Indoor Championships	Liévin, France	1st	800 m	1:48.12
1987	World Indoor Championships	Indianapolis, United States	8th	800 m	1:48.89
1987	World Championships	Rome, Italy	heats	800 m	1:50.58
1988	European Indoor Championships	Budapest, Hungary	2nd	800 m	1:49.45
1988	Olympic Games	Seoul, South Korea	quarter-final	800 m	1:46.91
1989	European Indoor Championships	The Hague (Netherlands)	2nd	800 m	1:48.96
1989	World Indoor Championships	Budapest, Hungary	semi-final	800 m	1:49.70

DNF = did not finish

== Personal bests ==
Outdoor

- 800 metres – 1:43.56 (Cologne 1985)
- 1000 metres – 2:15.23 (Utrecht 1985)
- 1500 metres – 3:35.07 (1985)

Indoor

- 800 metres – 1:46.29 (Stuttgart 1987)
- 1000 metres – 2:16.4 (The Hague 1988)

Awards
Preceded by Gerard Nijboer	Herman van Leeuwen Cup; 1983; 1985	Succeeded by Erik de Bruin
Preceded by Erik de Bruin	Herman van Leeuwen Cup; 1983; 1985	Succeeded by Han Kulker
Preceded by Gerard Nijboer	Dutch Sportsman of the Year; 1983	Succeeded by Stephan van den Berg
