= Simon Hoogewerf =

Canadian middle-distance runner

Personal information
- Born: May 11, 1963 (age 63) Beaverlodge, Alberta, Canada

Sport
- Sport: Track and field
Medal record
Representing Canada
World Indoor Championships
Bronze medal – third place	1991 Seville	800m

Simon Edward Charles Hoogewerf (born May 11, 1963) is a Canadian athlete, dominant in the middle distances, primarily the 800m, during the 1980s. He competed for his native country in the 800 metres at the 1988 Summer Olympics, where he was eliminated in the semifinals.

== See also ==
- Canadian records in track and field
