= 1988 European Athletics Indoor Championships =

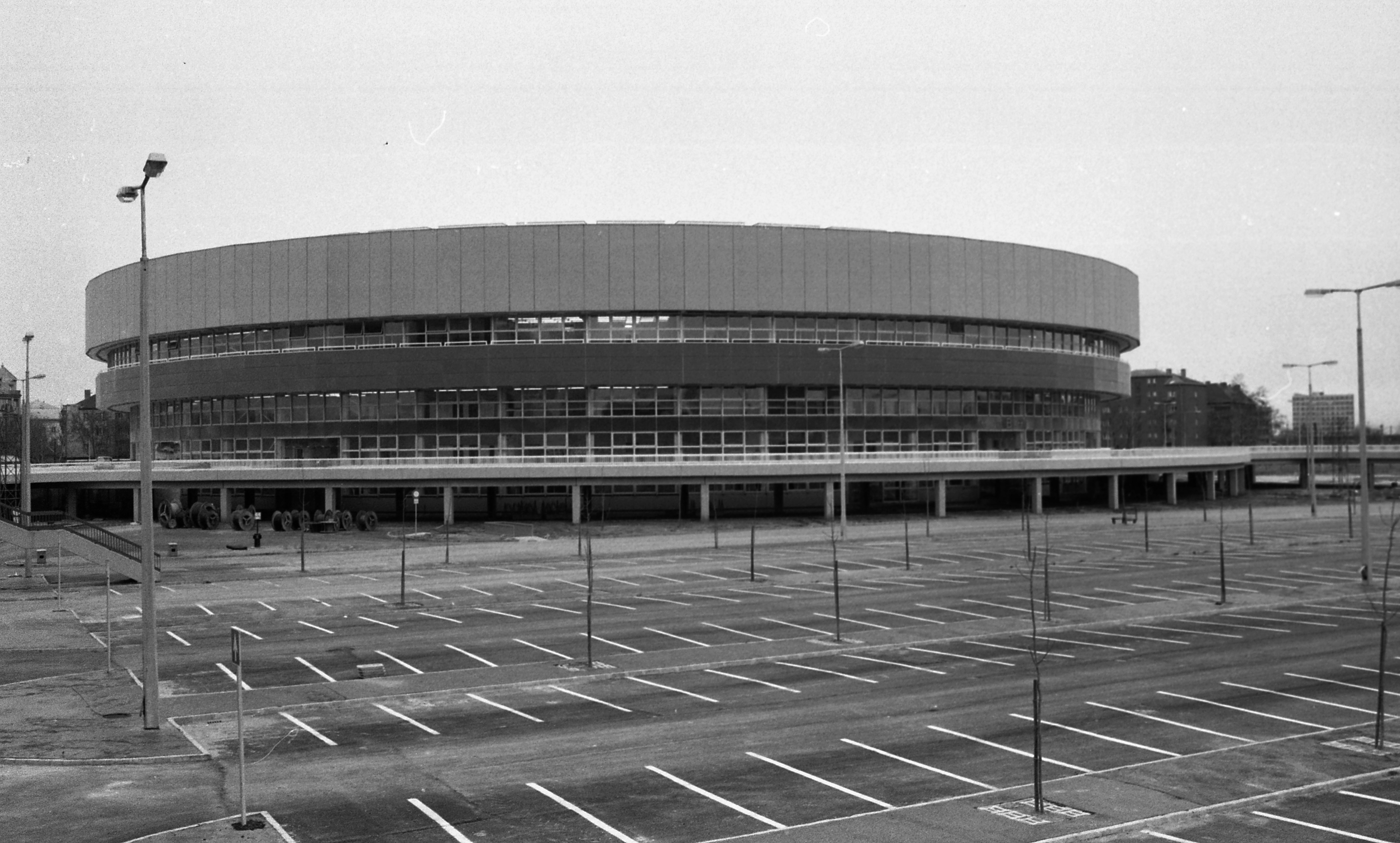
- Dates: 5–6 March
- Host city: Budapest; Hungary
- Venue: Budapest Sportcsarnok
- Events: 24
- Participation: 364 athletes from 27 nations

The 1988 European Athletics Indoor Championships were held in Budapest, Hungary on 5 and 6 March 1988.

== Medal summary ==
=== Men ===
Event	Gold		Silver		Bronze	
60 metres	Linford Christie (GBR)	6.57	Ronald Desruelles (BEL)	6.60	Valentin Atanasov (BUL)	6.60
200 metres	Nikolay Razgonov (URS)	20.62	Nikolay Antonov (BUL)	20.65	Linford Christie (GBR)	20.83
400 metres	Jens Carlowitz (GDR)	45.63	Brian Whittle (GBR)	45.98	Ralf Lübke (FRG)	46.25
800 metres	David Sharpe (GBR)	1:49.17	Rob Druppers (NED)	1:49.45	Gert Kilbert (SUI)	1:49.46
1500 metres	Ari Suhonen (FIN)	3:45.72	Ronny Olsson (SWE)	3:46.16	Rüdiger Horn (GDR)	3:46.51
3000 metres	José Luis González (ESP)	7:55.29	Markus Hacksteiner (SUI)	7:56.04	Mikhail Dasko (URS)	7:56.51
60 metres hurdles	Aleš Höffer (TCH)	7.56	Jon Ridgeon (GBR)	7.57	Carlos Sala (ESP)	7.67
5000 metres walk	Jozef Pribilinec (TCH)	18:44.40	Roman Mrázek (TCH)	18:44.91	Sándor Urbanik (HUN)	18:45.91
High jump	Patrik Sjöberg (SWE)	2.39	Dietmar Mögenburg (FRG)	2.37	Sorin Matei (ROM)	2.35
Pole vault	Rodion Gataullin (URS)	5.75	Nikolai Nikolov (BUL)	5.70	Atanas Tarev (BUL)	5.70
Long jump	Frans Maas (NED)	8.06	László Szalma (HUN)	8.03	Giovanni Evangelisti (ITA)	8.00
Triple jump	Oleg Sakirkin (URS)	17.30	Béla Bakosi (HUN)	17.25	Vasif Asadov (URS)	17.23
Shot put	Remigius Machura (TCH)	21.42	Karsten Stolz (FRG)	20.22	Georgi Todorov (BUL)	19.98

=== Women ===
Event	Gold		Silver		Bronze	
60 metres	Nelli Fiere-Cooman (NED)	7.04	Silke Gladisch (GDR)	7.05	Marlies Göhr (GDR)	7.07
200 metres	Ewa Kasprzyk (POL)	22.69	Tatyana Papilina (URS)	22.79	Silke Knoll (FRG)	23.12
400 metres	Petra Müller (GDR)	50.28	Helga Arendt (FRG)	51.06	Dagmar Neubauer (GDR)	51.57
800 metres	Sabine Zwiener (FRG)	2:01.19	Olga Nelyubova (URS)	2:01.61	Gabi Lesch (FRG)	2:01.85
1500 metres	Doina Melinte (ROM)	4:05.77	Mitica Junghiatu (ROM)	4:06.16	Brigitte Kraus (FRG)	4:07.06
3000 metres	Elly van Hulst (NED)	8:44.50	Vera Michallek (FRG)	8:46.97	Wendy Sly (GBR)	8:51.04
60 metres hurdles	Cornelia Oschkenat (GDR)	7.77	Marjan Olyslager (NED)	7.92	Mihaela Pogăcean (ROM)	7.92
3000 metres walk	María Reyes Sobrino (ESP)	12:48.99	Dana Vavracová (TCH)	12:51.08	Mari Cruz Díaz (ESP)	12:55.03
High jump	Stefka Kostadinova (BUL)	2.04	Heike Redetzky (FRG)	1.97	Larisa Kositsyna (URS)	1.97
Long jump	Heike Drechsler (GDR)	7.30	Galina Chistyakova (URS)	7.24	Jolanta Bartczak (POL)	6.62
Shot put	Claudia Losch (FRG)	20.39	Larisa Peleshenko (URS)	20.23	Kathrin Neimke (GDR)	20.20

== Medal table ==
Rank	Nation	Gold	Silver	Bronze	Total
1	East Germany (GDR)	4	1	4	9
2	Soviet Union (URS)	3	4	3	10
3	Czechoslovakia (TCH)	3	2	0	5
3	Netherlands (NED)	3	2	0	5
5	West Germany (FRG)	2	5	4	11
6	Great Britain (GBR)	2	2	2	6
7	Spain (ESP)	2	0	2	4
8	Bulgaria (BUL)	1	2	3	6
9	Romania (ROU)	1	1	2	4
10	Sweden (SWE)	1	1	0	2
11	Poland (POL)	1	0	1	2
12	Finland (FIN)	1	0	0	1
13	Hungary (HUN)	0	2	1	3
14	Switzerland (SUI)	0	1	1	2
15	Belgium (BEL)	0	1	0	1
16	Italy (ITA)	0	0	1	1
Totals (16 entries)		24	24	24	72

== Participating nations ==
- Austria (9)
- Belgium (7)
- Bulgaria (24)
- Cyprus (1)
- Czechoslovakia (19)
- Denmark (3)
- East Germany (17)
- Finland (10)
- France (19)
- Great Britain (24)
- Greece (4)
- Hungary (45)
- Ireland (3)
- Italy (27)
- Netherlands (14)
- Norway (4)
- Poland (8)
- Portugal (8)
- Romania (8)
- San Marino (1)
- Soviet Union (24)
- Spain (28)
- Sweden (10)
- Switzerland (4)
- Turkey (3)
- West Germany (32)
- Yugoslavia (8)

== See also ==
- 1988 in athletics (track and field)
