= Axel Harries =

German middle-distance runner

Personal information
- Nationality: German
- Born: 19 September 1964 (age 61)

Sport
- Sport: Middle-distance running
- Event: 800 metres

Axel Harries (born 19 September 1964) is a German middle-distance runner. He competed in the men's 800 metres at the 1984 Summer Olympics.
