= Robin van Helden =

Dutch middle-distance runner

Personal information
- Born: February 6, 1965 (age 61) Dordrecht, South Holland

Sport
- Sport: Track and field

Robin Arthur Anthony van Helden (born February 6, 1965) is a retired middle-distance runner from the Netherlands, who represented his native country at two consecutive Summer Olympics, starting in 1988.

Robin attending Louisiana State University and ran track and field for the LSU Tigers. He holds the LSU men's outdoor record in the 800 meters with a time of 1:45.53 (1987).
