= André Lavie =

French middle-distance runner

Personal information
- Born: 28 June 1959 Pau, France
- Died: 12 July 1990 (aged 31)

Sport
- Sport: Track and field
Medal record
Representing France
European Indoor Championships
Silver medal – second place	1984 Gothenburg	800m

André Lavie (28 June 1959 – 12 July 1990) was a French middle-distance runner who competed primarily in the 800 metres.

He won the silver medal at the 1984 European Indoor Championships and finished fifth at the 1985 World Indoor Games. He became French indoor champion in 1986 and 1988.

His personal best time was 1:46.9 minutes, achieved in June 1983 in Saint-Maur.
