= Babacar Niang =

Senegalese-French runner

Personal information
- Born: 9 September 1958 (age 68)

Sport
- Sport: Track and field
Medal record
Representing Senegal
African Championships
Gold medal – first place	1984 Rabat	4×400 m
Gold medal – first place	1988 Annaba	800 m
Silver medal – second place	1982 Cairo	4×400 m
Bronze medal – third place	1985 Cairo	4×400 m
Bronze medal – third place	1989 Lagos	800 m

Babacar Niang (born 9 September 1958) is a retired Senegalese-French middle distance runner who specialized in the 800 metres. He remains Senegal's national record holder in the 1000 metres dating back to 1983. In 1995, he briefly held the masters M35 world record for 800m, which lasted only a month before his contemporary Johnny Gray contested and beat the record.

== Achievements ==
Year	Competition	Venue	Position	Event	Notes
Representing Senegal
1988	African Championships	Annaba, Algeria	1st	800 m	
1989	African Championships	Lagos, Nigeria	3rd	800 m	
1989	Jeux de la Francophonie	Casablanca, Morocco	3rd	800 m	
