= Ari Suhonen =

Finnish middle-distance runner

Personal information
- Born: 19 December 1965 (age 60) Porvoo, Finland

Sport
- Sport: Track and field
Medal record
Representing Finland
Summer Universiade
Gold medal – first place	1989 Duisburg	800m
European Indoor Championships
Gold medal – first place	1988 Budapest	1500m
Bronze medal – third place	1987 Lievin	800m

Ari Suhonen (born 19 December 1965) is a Finnish former middle distance runner.

Suhonen was the best Finnish middle distance runner during the late 1980s and the early 1990s and he still holds the national record in the 800 metres, 1.44,10, ran in Zürich on 16 August 1989. He won national championships in the 800 metres nine times in a row, in the years 1985–1993. He also won the 1500 metres event in the same competition five times, in 1986-1989 and 1993. He was the European Indoor Champion of the 1500 metres in 1988. He also won bronze in the 800 metres of the European Indoor Championships in 1987. He took part in the 1988 Summer Olympics.

== Personal bests ==
400 metres	48,18	27 August 1985	
800 metres	1.44,10	16 August 1989	National record
1 000 metres	2.16,88	11 August 1987	National record
1 500 metres	3.36,89	9 August 1987	
3 000 metres	8.05,50	1 June 1988	
