= 1985 European Athletics Indoor Championships =

- Dates: 2–3 March 1985
- Host city: Piraeus, Attica; Greece
- Venue: Peace and Friendship Stadium
- Events: 22
- Participation: 318 athletes from 26 nations

The 1985 European Athletics Indoor Championships were held at the Peace and Friendship Stadium, Piraeus, Attica, Greece, on 2 and 3 March 1985.

== Medal summary ==
=== Men ===
Event	Gold		Silver		Bronze	
60 metres	Mike McFarlane (GBR)	6.61	Antoine Richard (FRA)	6.63	Ronald Desruelles (BEL)	6.64
200 metres	Stefano Tilli (ITA)	20.77	Olaf Prenzler (GDR)	20.83	Aleksandr Yevgenyev (URS)	20.95
400 metres	Todd Bennett (GBR)	45.56	Klaus Just (FRG)	45.90	José Alonso (ESP)	46.52
800 metres	Rob Harrison (GBR)	1:49.09	Petru Drăgoescu (ROM)	1:49.38	Leonid Masunov (URS)	1:49.59
1500 metres	José Luis González (ESP)	3:39.26	Marcus O'Sullivan (IRL)	3:39.75	José Luis Carreira (ESP)	3:40.43
3000 metres	Bob Verbeeck (BEL)	8:10.84	Thomas Wessinghage (FRG)	8:10.88	Vitaliy Tyshchenko (URS)	8:10.91
60 metres hurdles	György Bakos (HUN)	7.60	Jiří Hudec (TCH)	7.68	Vyacheslav Ustinov (URS)	7.70
High jump	Patrik Sjöberg (SWE)	2.35	Aleksandr Kotovich (URS)	2.30	Dariusz Biczysko (POL)	2.30
Pole vault	Sergey Bubka (URS)	5.70	Aleksandr Krupskiy (URS)	5.70	Atanas Tarev (BUL)	5.60
Long jump	Gyula Pálóczi (HUN)	8.15	László Szalma (HUN)	8.15	Sergey Layevskiy (URS)	8.14
Triple jump	Khristo Markov (BUL)	17.29	Ján Čado (TCH)	17.23	Volker Mai (GDR)	17.14
Shot put	Remigius Machura (TCH)	21.74	Ulf Timmermann (GDR)	21.44	Werner Günthör (SUI)	21.23

=== Women ===
Event	Gold		Silver		Bronze	
60 metres	Nelli Cooman (NED)	7.10	Marlies Göhr (GDR)	7.13	Heather Oakes (GBR)	7.22
200 metres	Marita Koch (GDR)	22.82	Kirsten Emmelmann (GDR)	23.06	Els Vader (NED)	23.64
400 metres	Sabine Busch (GDR)	51.35	Dagmar Neubauer (GDR)	51.40	Alena Bulířová (TCH)	52.64
800 metres	Ella Kovacs (ROM)	2:00.51	Nadiya Olizarenko (URS)	2:00.90	Cristieana Cojocaru (ROM)	2:01.01
1500 metres	Doina Melinte (ROM)	4:02.54	Fiţa Lovin (ROM)	4:03.46	Brigitte Kraus (FRG)	4:03.64
3000 metres	Agnese Possamai (ITA)	8:55.25	Olga Bondarenko (URS)	8:58.03	Yvonne Murray (GBR)	9:00.94
60 metres hurdles	Cornelia Oschkenat (GDR)	7.90	Ginka Zagorcheva (BUL)	8.02	Anne Piquereau (FRA)	8.03
High jump	Stefka Kostadinova (BUL)	1.97	Susanne Helm (GDR)	1.94	Danuta Bułkowska (POL)	1.90
Long jump	Galina Chistyakova (URS)	7.02	Eva Murková (TCH)	6.99	Heike Drechsler (GDR)	6.97
Shot put	Helena Fibingerová (TCH)	20.84	Claudia Losch (FRG)	20.59	Heike Hartwig (GDR)	19.93

== Medal table ==
Rank	Nation	Gold	Silver	Bronze	Total
1	East Germany (GDR)	3	6	3	12
2	Great Britain (GBR)	3	0	2	5
3	Soviet Union (URS)	2	4	5	11
4	Czechoslovakia (TCH)	2	3	1	6
5	Romania (ROU)	2	2	1	5
6	Bulgaria (BUL)	2	1	1	4
7	Hungary (HUN)	2	1	0	3
8	Italy (ITA)	2	0	0	2
9	Spain (ESP)	1	0	2	3
10	Belgium (BEL)	1	0	1	2
10	Netherlands (NED)	1	0	1	2
12	Sweden (SWE)	1	0	0	1
13	West Germany (FRG)	0	3	1	4
14	France (FRA)	0	1	1	2
15	Ireland (IRL)	0	1	0	1
16	Poland (POL)	0	0	2	2
17	Switzerland (SUI)	0	0	1	1
Totals (17 entries)		22	22	22	66

== Participating nations ==
- Austria (11)
- Belgium (5)
- Bulgaria (16)
- Cyprus (5)
- Czechoslovakia (23)
- East Germany (17)
- Finland (2)
- France (21)
- Great Britain (17)
- Greece (4)
- Hungary (14)
- Ireland (5)
- Italy (24)
- Luxembourg (3)
- Netherlands (6)
- Norway (8)
- Poland (13)
- Portugal (7)
- Romania (7)
- Soviet Union (22)
- Spain (24)
- Sweden (18)
- Switzerland (9)
- Turkey (1)
- West Germany (29)
- Yugoslavia (6)

== See also ==
- 1985 in athletics (track and field)
