= Athletics at the 1986 Goodwill Games – Results =

These are the official results of the athletics competition at the 1986 Goodwill Games which took place between July 5 and 9, 1986, at the Moscow Olympic Stadium in Moscow, Soviet Union.

Most of the running events had so many entrants that several heats had to be held with the combined results deciding on the medals (the sole exception was women's 100 metres hurdles where both heats and the final were held). This caused some controversy as the Soviets entered some of their better athletes in a theoretically weaker heat, possibly to avoid direct competition with the best rivals. This proved effective in the men's 1500 metres where Pavel Yakovlev ran in the first heat virtually unobstructed and paced by his teammate and eventually recorded a better time than the winner of the more tactical second heat featuring most of the favorites.

== Men's results ==
=== 100 meters ===
July 9
Wind:
Heat 1: +0.4 m/s, Heat 2: +0.8 m/s

Rank	Heat	Name	Nationality	Time	Notes
1st place, gold medalist(s)	2	Ben Johnson	Canada	9.95	
2nd place, silver medalist(s)	2	Chidi Imoh	Nigeria	10.04	
3rd place, bronze medalist(s)	2	Carl Lewis	United States	10.06	
4	2	Lee McRae	United States	10.12	
5	1	Vladimir Muravyov	Soviet Union	10.20	PB
6	1	Andrey Shlyapnikov	Soviet Union	10.21	PB
7	2	Mike Morris	United States	10.21	
8	2	Harvey Glance	United States	10.24	
9	2	Nikolay Yushmanov	Soviet Union	10.26	
10	2	Viktor Bryzgin	Soviet Union	10.31	
11	1	Andrei Fyodoriv	Soviet Union	10.36	
12	1	Shahallam Alam	Bangladesh	10.90	
13	1	David Lukuba	Tanzania	10.96	
14	1	Juan José Villamizar	Colombia	10.97	
15	1	Mauricio Vélez Domínguez	Colombia	11.03	
16	1	Patrice Mahoulikponto	Benin	11.14	

=== 200 meters ===
July 7
Wind:
Heat 1: 0.0 m/s, Heat 2: +0.6 m/s

Rank	Heat	Name	Nationality	Time	Notes
1st place, gold medalist(s)	2	Floyd Heard	United States	20.12	
2nd place, silver medalist(s)	2	Dwayne Evans	United States	20.45	
3rd place, bronze medalist(s)	2	Wallace Spearmon Sr.	United States	20.49	
4	2	Andrei Fyodoriv	Soviet Union	20.53	
5	2	Vladimir Krylov	Soviet Union	20.62	
6	1	Nikolay Yushmanov	Soviet Union	20.77	
7	2	Nikolay Razgonov	Soviet Union	20.83	
8	1	David Lukuba	Tanzania	22.19	

=== 400 meters ===
July 7

Rank	Heat	Name	Nationality	Time	Notes
1st place, gold medalist(s)	2	Antonio McKay	United States	44.98	
2nd place, silver medalist(s)	3	Clarence Daniel	United States	45.11	
3rd place, bronze medalist(s)	3	Darrell Robinson	United States	45.15	
4	3	Walter McCoy	United States	45.56	
5	3	Aleksandr Kurochkin	Soviet Union	45.67	
6	1	Danny Everett	United States	45.94	
7	3	Vladimir Prosin	Soviet Union	45.94	
8	3	Vladimir Volodko	Soviet Union	46.28	
9	2	Nikolay Chernetskiy	Soviet Union	46.29	
10	2	Vyacheslav Kocheryagin	Soviet Union	46.57	
11	2	Djétenan Kouadio	Ivory Coast	47.56	
12	2	Jorwa Jackskon Busiru	Tanzania	47.77	
13	1	Wilson Canizales	Colombia	48.75	
14	2	Robert Fanny Giovani	Seychelles	49.41	
15	1	Juan José Villamizar	Colombia	49.42	

=== 800 meters ===
July 8

Rank	Heat	Name	Nationality	Time	Notes
1st place, gold medalist(s)	2	Johnny Gray	United States	1:46.52	
2nd place, silver medalist(s)	2	Stanley Redwine	United States	1:46.89	
3rd place, bronze medalist(s)	1	Samuel Tirop	Kenya	1:47.05	
4	2	Ryszard Ostrowski	Poland	1:47.25	
5	2	Viktor Kalinkin	Soviet Union	1:47.42	
6	2	Nixon Kiprotich	Kenya	1:47.58	
7	1	Vladimir Graudyn	Soviet Union	1:47.80	
8	2	Ahmed Belkessam	Algeria	1:47.86	
9	1	Valeriy Starodubtsev	Soviet Union	1:47.94	
10	2	Anatoliy Milin	Soviet Union	1:48.09	
11	2	Leonid Masunov	Soviet Union	1:48.15	
12	1	Omar Khalifa	Sudan	1:50.75	
13	1	Philip Sinon	Seychelles	1:58.71	
14	1	Fahim Abdul Wahab	North Yemen	2:03.73	

=== 1500 meters ===
July 8

Rank	Heat	Name	Nationality	Time	Notes
1st place, gold medalist(s)	1	Pavel Yakovlev	Soviet Union	3:39.96	
2nd place, silver medalist(s)	2	Igor Lotorev	Soviet Union	3:40.18	
3rd place, bronze medalist(s)	2	Steve Scott	United States	3:40.31	
4	2	Jim Spivey	United States	3:40.41	
5	2	Andreas Busse	East Germany	3:40.65	
6	2	Jens-Peter Herold	East Germany	3:40.77	
7	2	Sergey Afanasyev	Soviet Union	3:40.97	
8	2	Anatoliy Legeda	Soviet Union	3:41.17	
9	2	Hauke Fuhlbrügge	East Germany	3:41.76	
10	1	Tapfumaneyi Jonga	Zimbabwe	3:41.82	
11	2	Anatoliy Kalutskiy	Soviet Union	3:42.58	
12	2	Rashid Kram	Algeria	3:42.99	
13	1	Sergey Lapetin	Soviet Union	3:43.26	
14	2	Teófilo Benito	Spain	3:45.88	
15	1	Jorge Delgado Aguilar	Costa Rica	4:06.21	
16	1	Alexandre Gansore	Burkina Faso	4:24.50	
17	1	Ahmed Khaled	North Yemen	4:35.00	

=== 5000 meters ===
July 7

Rank	Name	Nationality	Time	Notes
1st place, gold medalist(s)	Doug Padilla	United States	13:46.67	
2nd place, silver medalist(s)	Terry Brahm	United States	13:47.11	
3rd place, bronze medalist(s)	Evgeni Ignatov	Bulgaria	13:47.17	
4	Mikhail Dasko	Soviet Union	13:49.87	
5	Axel Krippschok	East Germany	13:54.03	
6	Vodadjo Bulti	Ethiopia	13:54.10	
7	Spiros Andriopulos	Greece	13:55.10	
8	David Choge	Kenya	13:57.13	
9	Dmitriy Dmitriev	Soviet Union	13:57.56	
10	Kirway Slaa Umbe	Tanzania	14:00.18	
11	Selase Milkesa	Ethiopia	14:10.17	
12	Ricardo Vera	Uruguay	14:16.44	
13	Kiriakos Mutasidis	Greece	14:23.64	
14	Belai Teshome	Ethiopia	14:37.62	
15	Jorge Delgado Aguilar	Costa Rica	14:58.08	
16	Abel Godoy	Uruguay	14:58.68	
17	Kaashem Abdul Wahab	North Yemen	16:14.54	

=== 10,000 meters ===
July 9

Rank	Name	Nationality	Time	Notes
1st place, gold medalist(s)	Domingos Castro	Portugal	28:11.21	
2nd place, silver medalist(s)	Gerard Donakowski	United States	28:11.87	
3rd place, bronze medalist(s)	Dionísio Castro	Portugal	28:12.04	
4	Mark Nenow	United States	28:20.84	
5	Takeyuki Nakayama	Japan	28:23.63	
6	Spyros Andriopoulos	Greece	28:27.23	
7	Werner Schildhauer	East Germany	28:32.49	
8	Shuichi Yoneshige	Japan	28:37.32	
9	Rolando Vera	Ecuador	28:43.01	
10	Kirway Slaa Umbe	Tanzania	28:46.17	
11	Kozu Akutsu	Japan	28:49.72	
12	Andrey Kuznetsov	Soviet Union	28:51.05	
13	Algis Dabulskis	Soviet Union	28:55.98	
14	Vodadjo Bulti	Ethiopia	29:25.39	
15	Ricardo Vera	Uruguay	29:39.61	
16	Belai Teshome	Ethiopia	30:02.46	
17	James Gombedza	Zimbabwe	31:08.20	
	Fernando Couto	Portugal	DNF	
	Rafael Marques	Portugal	DNF	
	Stanislav Rožman	Yugoslavia	DNF	
	Vicente Polo	Spain	DNF	
	Jorge Delgado Aguilar	Costa Rica	DNF	
	Abel Godoy	Uruguay	DNF	
	Kaashem Abdul Wahab	North Yemen	DNF	

=== Marathon ===
July 6

Rank	Name	Nationality	Time	Notes
1st place, gold medalist(s)	Belayneh Dinsamo	Ethiopia	2:14:42	
2nd place, silver medalist(s)	Igor Broslavskiy	Soviet Union	2:15:24	
3rd place, bronze medalist(s)	Yakov Tolstikov	Soviet Union	2:16:22	
4	Ravil Kashapov	Soviet Union	2:17:10	
5	Valentin Starikov	Soviet Union	2:17:21	
6	Sergey Rozum	Soviet Union	2:17:54	
7	Cho Hi Bok	North Korea	2:18:08	
8	Alify Perevozchikov	Soviet Union	2:18:51	
9	Yuriy Porotov	Soviet Union	2:19:19	
10	Dmitry Feoktistov	Soviet Union	2:19:36	
11	Aleksandr Baza	Soviet Union	2:19:56	
12	Vladimir Kotov	Soviet Union	2:20:10	
13	Nikolay Tabak	Soviet Union	2:20:12	
14	Yuriy Kozmin	Soviet Union	2:21:39	
15	Vladimir Ryazantsev	Soviet Union	2:21:53	
16	Japhet Mashishanga	Tanzania	2:22:21	
17	Viktor Mozgovoy	Soviet Union	2:22:29	
18	Aleksandr Kubak	Soviet Union	2:22:33	
19	Valeriy Solovyey	Soviet Union	2:22:59	
20	Sergey Makarov	Soviet Union	2:23:11	
21	Vladimir Nikityuk	Soviet Union	2:23:14	
22	Viktor Taratukhin	Soviet Union	2:23:30	
23	Aleksandr Belyayev	Soviet Union	2:23:41	
24	Georgios Athordacos	Greece	2:24:10	
25	Sergey Krestyaninov	Soviet Union	2:24:11	
26	Nikolay Solovyev	Soviet Union	2:24:26	
27	Vladimir Zakirov	Soviet Union	2:24:36	
28	Mealis Veilberg	Soviet Union	2:25:14	
29	Grigoriy Popenko	Soviet Union	2:25:34	
30	Nikolay Ivanov	Soviet Union	2:25:48	
31	Vladimir Beloborodov	Soviet Union	2:25:58	
32	Aleksandr Khlynin	Soviet Union	2:26:08	
33	Viktor Levkin	Soviet Union	2:26:14	
34	Kyle Heffner	United States	2:26:38	
35	Aleksandr Itrukhin	Soviet Union	2:30:56	
36	Georgiy Sokolov	Soviet Union	2:32:53	
37	Li Chon Ghyong	North Korea	2:33:15	
38	Daniel Nzioka	Kenya	2:33:17	
39	Sergey Petrov	Soviet Union	2:33:42	
40	Stauros Karakatsakis	Greece	2:35:48	
41	Vadim Sidorov	Soviet Union	2:36:31	
42	Irineo Aguilar	Mexico	2:37:05	
43	Nikolay Savenok	Soviet Union	2:38:05	
44	Igor Levteyev	Soviet Union	2:42:39	
45	José Gurdián	Nicaragua	2:43:53	
46	Tykea Peou	Cambodia	2:59:39	
47	Sergey Bochtaryov	Soviet Union	3:06:07	
48	Charles Blanshard	United States	3:08:08	
49	Richard Reily	United States	3:09:27	
50	Roger Clark	United States	3:24:40	
51	Eugene Young	United States	3:29:22	
52	Van Thyet Nguyen	Vietnam	3:32:00	
53	Edwin Massong	United States	3:33:00	
54	Grant Stevens	United States	3:33:51	
55	Khampheng Mitpasa	Laos	3:37:26	
56	Todd Blanshard	United States	3:37:29	
57	Michael Colton	United States	3:38:41	
58	Timothy Andersson	United States	3:42:23	
59	James Morehouse	United States	3:51:44	
60	Donald McGinty	United States	3:51:51	
61	James Steel	United States	3:54:25	
62	Barry Levy	United States	3:54:59	
63	Peter Werbeescar-Brown	United States	3:55:08	
64	Gordon Starr	United States	3:55:08	
65	Joseph Fortune	United States	3:58:17	
66	Julian Reider	United States	4:14:05	
67	Gary Markoff	United States	4:19:56	
68	Michael Frank	United States	4:24:37	
69	Mallory Bonpoid	United States	4:24:46	
70	John Cantwell	United States	4:29:51	
71	Phillip Taylor	United States	4:32:21	
72	Lee Powell	United States	4:40:00	
73	Lawrence Lobocchiaro	United States	4:40:10	
74	David Fialkow	United States	4:40:10	
75	Clark Reed	United States	4:44:28	
76	Richard Sandler	United States	4:51:22	
77	William Parker	United States	5:05:10	
	Oleg Movenko	Soviet Union	DNF	
	Yevgeniy Okorokov	Soviet Union	DNF	
	Sergey Rudenko	Soviet Union	DNF	
	Viktor Nedybalyuk	Soviet Union	DNF	
	James Orembe	Soviet Union	DNF	
	Anastasios Psaphas	Soviet Union	DNF	
	Vladimir Tikhonov	Soviet Union	DNF	
	Brendan Reily	United States	DNF	
	Gennadiy Grechkoyedov	Soviet Union	DNF	
	Yuriy Fomenkov	Soviet Union	DNF	
	Fyodor Ryzhov	Soviet Union	DNF	
	Petyor Saltykov	Soviet Union	DNF	
	Benji Durden	United States	DNF	
	Ron Tabb	United States	DNF	
	Leonid Nasedkin	Soviet Union	DNF	
	Aleksandr Tanikov	Soviet Union	DNF	
	Viktor Semenov	Soviet Union	DNF	
	Tervo Chiba	Japan	DNF	
	Vyacheslav Ehndyuskin	Soviet Union	DNF	
	John Hendrickson	United States	DNF	
	Michael Kusis	Greece	DNF	
	Jorge Delgado	Costa Rica	DNF	
	Anatoliy Filatov	Soviet Union	DNF	

=== 110 meters hurdles ===
July 6
Wind:
Heat 1: +0.9 m/s, Heat 2: ? m/s

Rank	Heat	Name	Nationality	Time	Notes
1st place, gold medalist(s)	2	Greg Foster	United States	13.25	
2nd place, silver medalist(s)	1	Andrey Prokofyev	Soviet Union	13.28	
3rd place, bronze medalist(s)	2	Keith Talley	United States	13.31	
4	1	Igor Perevedentsev	Soviet Union	13.47	
5	2	Aleksandr Markin	Soviet Union	13.48	
6	2	Igor Kazanov	Soviet Union	13.50	
7	1	Vladimir Shishkin	Soviet Union	13.50	
8	2	Don Wright	Australia	13.65	
9	1	Gennadiy Chugunov	Soviet Union	13.84	
	2	György Bakos	Hungary	DNF	
	2	Liviu Giurgian	Romania	DNF	

=== 400 meters hurdles ===
July 9

Rank	Heat	Name	Nationality	Time	Notes
1st place, gold medalist(s)	2	Edwin Moses	United States	47.94	
2nd place, silver medalist(s)	2	Aleksandr Vasilyev	Soviet Union	48.24	
3rd place, bronze medalist(s)	2	David Patrick	United States	48.59	
4	2	Amadou Dia Ba	Senegal	48.73	
5	1	Athanasious Kalogianis	Greece	48.88	
6	2	Toma Tomov	Bulgaria	49.08	
7	2	Kevin Young	United States	49.35	
8	1	Oleg Azarov	Soviet Union	49.38	
9	1	Vladimir Budko	Soviet Union	49.54	
10	2	Tagir Zemskov	Soviet Union	49.80	
11	2	Valeriy Vikhrov	Soviet Union	50.03	
12	1	Ryszard Stoch	Poland	50.66	
13	1	Djedjemel Réné Meledje	Ivory Coast	50.78	
14	1	Arnul Chara Urzuriaga	Colombia	52.12	
15	1	José Casabona	Spain	52.25	

=== 3000 meters steeplechase ===
July 8

Rank	Heat	Name	Nationality	Time	Notes
1st place, gold medalist(s)	2	Hagen Melzer	East Germany	8:23.06	
2nd place, silver medalist(s)	2	Henry Marsh	United States	8:23.92	
3rd place, bronze medalist(s)	2	Nikolay Matyushenko	Soviet Union	8:25.73	
4	2	Micah Boinet	Kenya	8:28.20	
5	1	Lev Glinskikh	Soviet Union	8:29.51	
6	2	Ivan Danu	Soviet Union	8:30.74	
7	1	Joseph Chelelgo	Kenya	8:33.03	
8	2	Jim Cooper	United States	8:33.77	
9	2	Ivan Konovalov	Soviet Union	8:35.05	
10	2	Henryk Jankowski	Poland	8:35.29	
11	2	Brendan Quinn	Ireland	8:36.42	
12	1	Ricardo Vera	Uruguay	8:38.28	
13	1	Féthi Baccouche	Tunisia	8:38.94	
14	1	Shigeyuki Aikyo	Japan	8:40.02	
15	1	Domingo Ramón	Spain	8:41.31	
16	1	Liam O'Brien	Ireland	8:43.34	
17	1	Kiriakos Mutasidis	Greece	8:43.34	
18	2	David Choge	Kenya	8:46.69	
19	2	Mike Fadil	United States	8:49.93	
20	1	Farai Kamucheka	Zimbabwe	9:00.81	
	2	Bogusław Mamiński	Poland	DNF	

=== 4 × 100 meters relay ===
July 9

Rank	Lane	Nation	Competitors	Time	Notes
1st place, gold medalist(s)	3	United States	Lee McRae, Floyd Heard, Harvey Glance, Carl Lewis	37.98	
2nd place, silver medalist(s)	4	Soviet Union "A"	Aleksandr Yevgenyev, Vladimir Muravyov, Nikolai Yushmanov, Viktor Bryzgin	38.19	NR
3rd place, bronze medalist(s)	6	Soviet Union "B"	Aleksandr Kutepov, Roman Osipenko, Dmitry Bartenev, Sergey Klyonov	40.22	
4	5	Colombia	Mauricio Vélez, Juan José Villamizar, Arnul Chara Urzuriaga, Wilson Canizales	41.44	

=== 4 × 400 meters relay ===
July 8

Rank	Nation	Competitors	Time	Notes
1st place, gold medalist(s)	Soviet Union	Vladimir Krylov, Vladimir Prosin, Vladimir Volodko, Aleksandr Kurochkin	3:01.25	
2nd place, silver medalist(s)	United States	Walter McCoy, Clarence Daniel, Danny Everett, Darrell Robinson	3:01.47	
3rd place, bronze medalist(s)	Ivory Coast	Djétenan Kouadio, Akissi Kpidi, René Djédjémel Mélédjé, Gabriel Tisko	3:13.51	

=== 20 kilometers walk ===
July 7

Rank	Name	Nationality	Time	Notes
1st place, gold medalist(s)	Aleksey Pershin	Soviet Union	1:23:29	
2nd place, silver medalist(s)	Aleksandr Boyarshinov	Soviet Union	1:23:36	
3rd place, bronze medalist(s)	Yevgeniy Misyulya	Soviet Union	1:23:53	
4	Guillaume LeBlanc	Canada	1:23:57	
5	Anatoliy Gorshkov	Soviet Union	1:24:51	
6	Vyacheslav Ivanenko	Soviet Union	1:25:00	
7	Yevgeniy Yevsyukov	Soviet Union	1:25:30	
8	David Smith	Australia	1:25:47	
9	Sergey Tsimbalyuk	Soviet Union	1:26:26	
10	Valdas Kazlauskas	Soviet Union	1:26:44	
11	Querubín Moreno	Colombia	1:27:01	
12	Igor Plotnikov	Soviet Union	1:27:10	
13	Robert Illiy	Soviet Union	1:27:30	
14	Nikolay Polozov	Soviet Union	1:27:49	
15	Igor Lyubomirov	Soviet Union	1:27:56	
16	Timothy Lewis	United States	1:28:13	
17	Carl Shueler	United States	1:28:24	
18	Venyamin Nikolayev	Soviet Union	1:28:52	
19	Petr Kakhnovich	Soviet Union	1:28:57	
20	François Lapointe	Canada	1:29:11	
21	Vyacheslav Vezhel	Soviet Union	1:29:21	
22	Sergey Abiralo	Soviet Union	1:29:21	
23	Aleksandr Potashyov	Soviet Union	1:29:52	
24	Viliulfo Andablo	Mexico	1:30:00	
25	Petyor Pochinchuk	Soviet Union	1:30:05	
26	Oleg Sadkov	Soviet Union	1:30:39	
27	Frans Kostyukevich	Soviet Union	1:31:10	
28	Anton Mashkyevich	Soviet Union	1:31:12	
29	Sergey Ivanovich	Soviet Union	1:31:22	
30	Vyacheslav Smirnov	Soviet Union	1:31:38	
31	Algis Grigalyunas	Soviet Union	1:31:54	
32	Yuriy Bogoyavlenskiy	Soviet Union	1:32:14	
33	Andrey Popov	Soviet Union	1:32:41	
34	Vladimir Soyko	Soviet Union	1:32:41	
35	Vladimir Pishko	Soviet Union	1:33:06	
36	Alik Ibryamov	Bulgaria	1:33:09	
37	Aleksandr Karandeyev	Soviet Union	1:33:42	
38	Vladimir Vasilyenko	Soviet Union	1:33:47	
39	Dmitriy Osipov	Soviet Union	1:33:56	
40	German Istomin	Soviet Union	1:34:19	
41	Nikolay Panfilov	Soviet Union	1:34:19	
42	Jorge Llopart	Spain	1:34:20	
43	Vladimir Druchek	Soviet Union	1:34:21	
44	Raymond Sharp	United States	1:34:21	
45	Vasiliy Matveyev	Soviet Union	1:34:21	
46	Yevgeniy Reyngolt	Soviet Union	1:35:47	
47	Abdulakhab Fergen	Algeria	1:36:07	
48	Vyacheslav Cherepanov	Soviet Union	1:36:53	
49	Enrique Peña	Colombia	1:37:00	
50	Andrey Gnusarev	Soviet Union	1:37:26	
51	Sergey Schmayko	Soviet Union	1:38:09	
52	Marcelino Colin	Mexico	1:38:37	
	Sigitas Vainauskas	Soviet Union	DNF	
	Simon Baker	Australia	DNF	
	Vladislav Trushkin	Soviet Union	DNF	
	Ivan Sankovskiy	Soviet Union	DNF	
	Sergey Pasko	Soviet Union	DNF	
	Vitaliy Popovich	Soviet Union	DNF	
	Anatoliy Solomin	Soviet Union	DNF	
	Reima Salonen	Finland	DQ	

=== High jump ===
July 9

Rank	Name	Nationality	2.10	2.15	2.20	2.25	2.29	2.32	2.34	2.36	Result	Notes
1st place, gold medalist(s)	Doug Nordquist	United States						o	xo	xxx	2.34	PB
2nd place, silver medalist(s)	Igor Paklin	Soviet Union						o	xxx		2.32	
3rd place, bronze medalist(s)	Sorin Matei	Romania	–	o	o	o	xxo	xxo	xxx		2.32	
4	Sergey Malchenko	Soviet Union						xxx			2.29	
5	Ján Zvara	Czechoslovakia						xxx			2.29	
6	Rudolf Povarnitsyn	Soviet Union									2.25	
7	Gennadiy Avdeyenko	Soviet Union									2.25	
8	Geoff Parsons	Great Britain									2.25	
9	Zhu Jianhua	China									2.20	
10	Yuriy Sergiyenko	Soviet Union									2.20	
11	Gerd Wessig	East Germany									2.20	
12	Andreas Sam	East Germany									2.20	
13	Jindřich Vondra	Czechoslovakia									2.20	
14	Dariusz Zielke	Poland									2.15	
15	Sašo Apostolovski	Yugoslavia									2.15	
	Jim Howard	United States									NM	

=== Pole vault ===
July 8

Rank	Name	Nationality	Result	Notes
1st place, gold medalist(s)	Sergey Bubka	Soviet Union	6.01	WR
2nd place, silver medalist(s)	Radion Gataullin	Soviet Union	5.80	
3rd place, bronze medalist(s)	Earl Bell	United States	5.75	
4	Mike Tully	United States	5.70	
5	Aleksandr Krupskiy	Soviet Union	5.60	
6	Vasiliy Bubka	Soviet Union	5.60	
7	František Jansa	Czechoslovakia	5.40	
8	Philippe Houvion	France	5.40	
	Liang Xueren	China	NM	
	Ji Zebiao	China	NM	

=== Long jump ===
July 6

Rank	Name	Nationality	#1	#2	#3	#4	#5	#6	Result	Notes
1st place, gold medalist(s)	Robert Emmiyan	Soviet Union	8.15		8.24	8.61			8.61	AR
2nd place, silver medalist(s)	Larry Myricks	United States		8.12	8.36			8.41	8.41	
3rd place, bronze medalist(s)	Sergey Layevskiy	Soviet Union							8.20	
4	Atanas Chochev	Bulgaria							7.83	
5	Jan Leitner	Czechoslovakia	7.54						7.83	
6	Klaus Beyer	East Germany							7.82	
7	Atanas Atanasov	Bulgaria		7.72					7.80	
8	Wang Shijie	China		7.46		7.68			7.68	
9	Tyrus Jefferson	United States	7.51	x	7.58				7.58	
10	Gyula Pálóczi	Hungary							7.40	
11	Mauricio Vélez	Colombia							6.70	
	Toussaint Rabenala	Madagascar							NM	
	Muddivur Mallick	Bangladesh							NM	

=== Triple jump ===
July 9

Rank	Name	Nationality	Result	Notes
1st place, gold medalist(s)	Mike Conley Sr.	United States	17.69	
2nd place, silver medalist(s)	Khristo Markov	Bulgaria	17.35	
3rd place, bronze medalist(s)	Nikolay Musiyenko	Soviet Union	17.33	
4	Charlie Simpkins	United States	17.23	
5	Aleksandr Yakovlev	Soviet Union	17.00	
6	Paul Emordi	Nigeria	16.73	
7	Norifumi Yamashita	Japan	16.68	
8	Dirk Gamlin	East Germany	16.63	
9	Ivan Slanař	Czechoslovakia	16.55	
10	Stephen Hanna	Bahamas	16.25	
11	Ján Čado	Czechoslovakia	16.12	
12	Toussaint Rabenala	Madagascar	14.75	
13	Oleg Protsenko	Soviet Union	14.67	
	Willie Banks	United States	DNS	

=== Shot put ===
July 8

Rank	Name	Nationality	Result	Notes
1st place, gold medalist(s)	Sergey Smirnov	Soviet Union	21.79	
2nd place, silver medalist(s)	Sergey Gavryushin	Soviet Union	21.09	
3rd place, bronze medalist(s)	John Brenner	United States	20.62	
4	Gregg Tafralis	United States	20.32	
5	Yanis Boyars	Soviet Union	20.11	
6	Dimitros Kutsukis	Greece	19.13	
	Helmut Krieger	Poland	NM	

=== Discus throw ===
July 6

Rank	Name	Nationality	#1	#2	#3	#4	#5	#6	Result	Notes
1st place, gold medalist(s)	Romas Ubartas	Soviet Union	67.12	65.48					67.12	
2nd place, silver medalist(s)	Dmitriy Kovtsun	Soviet Union	61.26						64.24	
3rd place, bronze medalist(s)	Knut Hjeltnes	Norway						64.02	64.02	
4	Imrich Bugár	Czechoslovakia		63.80					63.80	
5	Georgiy Kolnootchenko	Soviet Union							63.38	
6	Rick Meyer	United States	62.76						62.76	
7	Mike Buncic	United States	59.86						61.34	
8	Vasiliy Kaptyukh	Soviet Union	60.02						60.02	
9	Konstantin Georgakopulos	Greece	53.40						53.40	

=== Hammer throw ===
July 9

Rank	Name	Nationality	Result	Notes
1st place, gold medalist(s)	Yuriy Sedykh	Soviet Union	84.72	
2nd place, silver medalist(s)	Sergey Litvinov	Soviet Union	84.64	
3rd place, bronze medalist(s)	Benyaminas Vilutskis	Soviet Union	80.04	
4	Ralf Haber	East Germany	78.50	
5	Igor Nikulin	Soviet Union	78.50	
6	Jüri Tamm	Soviet Union	77.50	
7	Jud Logan	United States	74.78	
8	Günther Rodehau	East Germany	74.50	
9	Tore Gustafsson	Sweden	74.40	
10	Bill Green	United States	73.44	
11	Valeriy Gubkin	Soviet Union	72.32	
12	Michael Beierl	Austria	71.74	
13	Abdelkhakim Tumi	Algeria	67.00	
14	Sean Egan	Ireland	63.22	

=== Javelin throw ===
July 6

Rank	Name	Nationality	Result	Notes
1st place, gold medalist(s)	Tom Petranoff	United States	83.46	
2nd place, silver medalist(s)	Kheino Puuste	Soviet Union	83.12	
3rd place, bronze medalist(s)	Sergey Gavras	Soviet Union	81.44	
4	Viktor Yevsyukov	Soviet Union	80.82	
5	Einar Vilhjálmsson	Iceland	78.62	
6	Marek Kaleta	Soviet Union	78.22	
7	Klaus-Jörg Murawa	East Germany	73.32	
8	Bob Roggy	United States	71.96	
	Mourad Mahour Bacha	Algeria	NM	

=== Decathlon ===
July 6–7

The highest mark recorded in each event is highlighted in yellow

Rank	Athlete	Nationality	100m	LJ	SP	HJ	400m	110m H	DT	PV	JT	1500m	Points	Notes
1st place, gold medalist(s)	Grigoriy Degtyaryov	Soviet Union	10.90	7.52	15.33	2.02	50.10	14.65	48.56	4.80	59.28	4:29.34	8322	
2nd place, silver medalist(s)	Aleksandr Apaichev	Soviet Union	11.09	7.35	15.66	1.96	50.23	14.19	44.80	4.60	67.12	4:28.46	8244	
	Valter Külvet	Soviet Union	11.30	7.04	15.50	1.99	49.45	15.03	49.94	4.90	61.32	4:30.29	8168	*
	Aleksandr Nevskiy	Soviet Union	11.04	7.24	15.57	1.99	49.48	14.70	46.40	4.70	54.40	4:20.67	8143	*
3rd place, bronze medalist(s)	Aleksey Lyakh	Soviet Union	11.18	7.71	14.97	2.05	50.60	14.85	44.40	4.60	61.28	4:40.10	8082	
	Sergey Popov	Soviet Union	11.18	7.45	14.49	1.96	49.75	15.18	48.60	4.90	58.78	4:34.34	8079	*
4	Jens Petersson	East Germany	10.72	7.80	14.59	1.99	48.56	14.71	42.82	4.50	50.66	4:33.84	8060	
5	Hans-Ulrich Riecke	East Germany	10.60	7.74	14.58	1.90	49.31	14.81	42.96	4.40	57.90	4:37.94	8000	
6	Tim Bright	United States	11.05	6.79	12.96	2.11	49.02	14.40	39.22	5.40	53.16	4:39.35	7972	
7	Uwe Freimuth	East Germany	11.11	7.29	15.59	1.84	48.77	14.84	48.84	4.40	59.84	4:38.25	7950	
8	Thomas Fahner	East Germany	10.86	7.35	14.39	1.81	48.30	15.05	41.28	5.10	59.18	4:42.52	7939	
9	Thomas Halamoda	East Germany	10.98	7.58	14.84	1.87	49.46	15.16	41.22	4.40	64.28	4:35.08	7891	
	Sergey Zhelanov	Soviet Union	11.28	7.58w	14.31	2.08	50.11	14.69	37.14	4.70	56.32	4:48.65	7812	*
	Vadim Podmaryov	Soviet Union	11.18	7.26w	14.31	2.05	50.88	15.15	46.42	4.60	54.44	4:48.34	7769	*
	Andrey Fomochkin	Soviet Union	10.75	7.41	14.17	1.87	48.83	14.90	44.14	4.20	52.98	4:34.21	7759	*
10	Sven Reintak	Soviet Union	11.32	6.11	13.93	2.02	50.19	14.65	44.76	4.60	63.46	4:26.54	7754	
	Aleksandr Tsyoma	Soviet Union	10.99	7.07	14.53	1.96	50.92	14.59	44.66	4.60	55.20	4:46.61	7749	*
	Vladimir Romanov	Soviet Union	11.04	7.13	15.26	1.99	51.74	15.79	48.24	4.30	52.84	4:41.44	7628	*
11	Andreas Poser	East Germany	10.98	7.10	13.58	1.93	50.78	15.68	42.98	4.70	61.72	4:59.66	7564	
	Yevgeniy Ovsyannikov	Soviet Union	11.33	7.37w	14.59	2.08	50.98	14.96	43.80	4.40	43.58	4:56.84	7504	*
12	Steffan Blomstrand	Sweden	11.27	6.70	12.94	1.93	48.81	16.12	43.46	4.40	59.28	4:32.79	7456	
	Aleksandr Adamov	Soviet Union	11.68	6.86	13.42	1.90	51.50	15.63	42.10	4.20	63.68	4:47.47	7232	*
13	Pavel Tarnavetskiy	Soviet Union	11.13	7.44	14.23	2.08	49.20	14.95	45.72	NM	51.32	4:33.89	7189	
	Anders Nyberg	Sweden	11.20	6.67	15.24	1.90	52.01	15.17	41.16	4.30	65.58	DNS	DNF	
	Mike Ramos	United States	10.87		15.20								DNF	
	Garret Armstrong	United States	10.84					14.46					DNF	
	Rišardas Malachovskis	Soviet Union											DNF	
	John Sayre	United States											DNF	

*Out of competition performance

== Women's results ==
=== 100 meters ===
July 6
Wind: +0.2 m/s

Rank	Lane	Name	Nationality	Time	Notes
1st place, gold medalist(s)	6	Evelyn Ashford	United States	10.91	
2nd place, silver medalist(s)	2	Heike Drechsler	East Germany	10.91	
3rd place, bronze medalist(s)	5	Elvira Barbashina	Soviet Union	11.12	
4	4	Alice Brown	United States	11.14	
5	3	Irina Slyusar	Soviet Union	11.22	
6	7	Antonina Nastoburko	Soviet Union	11.29	
7	1	Anelia Nuneva	Bulgaria	11.40	
8	8	Angela Bailey	Canada	11.50	

=== 200 meters ===
July 8
Wind:
Heat 2: +1.2 m/s

Rank	Heat	Name	Nationality	Time	Notes
1st place, gold medalist(s)	2	Pam Marshall	United States	22.12	
2nd place, silver medalist(s)	2	Ewa Kasprzyk	Poland	22.13	NR
3rd place, bronze medalist(s)	2	Elvira Barbashina	Soviet Union	22.27	
4	2	Gwen Torrence	United States	22.53	
5	1	Randy Givens	United States	22.61	
6	2	Marie-Christine Cazier	France	22.71	
7	2	Juliet Cuthbert	Jamaica	22.88	
8	1	Maya Azarashvili	Soviet Union	23.01	
9	2	Silke Gladisch	East Germany	DNF	
	2	Diane Dixon	United States	DNS	

=== 400 meters ===
July 9

Rank	Heat	Name	Nationality	Time	Notes
1st place, gold medalist(s)	?	Olga Vladykina	Soviet Union	49.96	
2nd place, silver medalist(s)	?	Mariya Pinigina	Soviet Union	50.29	
3rd place, bronze medalist(s)	?	Lillie Leatherwood-King	United States	50.47	
4	?	Diane Dixon	United States	50.77	
5	?	Genowefa Błaszak	Poland	51.52	
6	?	Christiana Matei	Romania	51.57	
7	?	Nadiya Olizarenko	Soviet Union	51.60	
8	?	Olga Pesnopevtseva	Soviet Union	51.86	
9	?	Olga Nazarova	Soviet Union	52.39	
10	?	Lyudmila Dzhigalova	Soviet Union	52.44	
11	?	Rosica Stamonva	Bulgaria	52.59	
12	?	Alice Jackson	United States	52.91	
13	?	Natalya Bochina	Soviet Union	52.97	
14	?	Mary Parr	United States	56.32	

=== 800 meters ===
July 6

Rank	Name	Nationality	Time	Notes
1st place, gold medalist(s)	Lyubov Gurina	Soviet Union	1:57.52	
2nd place, silver medalist(s)	Nadezhda Zabolotneva	Soviet Union	1:57.54	
3rd place, bronze medalist(s)	Mitica Junghiatu	Romania	1:57.87	
4	Milena Strnadová	Czechoslovakia	1:57.90	
5	Lyubov Kiryukhina	Soviet Union	1:58.69	
6	Nadiya Olizarenko	Soviet Union	1:58.74	
7	Claudette Groenendaal	United States	1:59.31	
8	Delisa Walton-Floyd	United States	2:01.98	

=== 1500 meters ===
July 9

Rank	Name	Nationality	Time	Notes
1st place, gold medalist(s)	Tatyana Samolenko	Soviet Union	4:05.50	
2nd place, silver medalist(s)	Ravilya Agletdinova	Soviet Union	4:06.14	
3rd place, bronze medalist(s)	Svetlana Kitova	Soviet Union	4:07.21	
4	Margareta Keszeg	Romania	4:08.34	
5	Mitica Junghiatu	Romania	4:08.37	
6	Nikolina Shtereva	Bulgaria	4:10.71	
7	Christine Gregorek	United States	4:10.79	
8	Linda Detlefsen	United States	4:10.92	
9	Agnese Possamai	Italy	4:12.27	
10	Roberta Brunet	Italy	4:13.07	
11	Lynn Jennings	United States	4:13.51	

=== 3000 meters ===
July 6

Rank	Name	Nationality	Time	Notes
1st place, gold medalist(s)	Mariana Stănescu	Romania	8:38.83	
2nd place, silver medalist(s)	Svetlana Ulmasova	Soviet Union	8:39.19	
3rd place, bronze medalist(s)	Regina Chistyakova	Soviet Union	8:39.25	
4	Yelena Zhupiyova	Soviet Union	8:43.46	
5	PattiSue Plumer	United States	8:46.24	
6	Mary Knisely	United States	8:49.00	
7	Margareta Keszeg	Romania	8:51.54	
8	Cindy Bremser	United States	8:53.74	
9	Alla Jushina	Soviet Union	8:57.71	
10	Zita Ágoston	Hungary	9:21.56	

=== 5000 meters ===
July 8

Rank	Name	Nationality	Time	Notes
1st place, gold medalist(s)	Olga Bondarenko	Soviet Union	15:03.51	
2nd place, silver medalist(s)	Svetlana Ulmasova	Soviet Union	15:05.50	
3rd place, bronze medalist(s)	Cindy Bremser	United States	15:11.78	
4	Svetlana Guskova	Soviet Union	15:17.90	
5	PattiSue Plumer	United States	15:20.88	
6	Gabrielle Weith	East Germany	15:21.90	
7	Yelena Zhupiyova	Soviet Union	15:23.55	
8	Marina Rodchenkova	Soviet Union	15:31.99	
9	Betty Springs	United States	15:41.39	
10	Mariana Stănescu	Romania	15:45.73	
11	Natalya Sorokivskaya	Soviet Union	15:47.73	
12	Ria Van Landeghem	Belgium	15:53.38	
13	Conceição Ferreira	Portugal	15:54.01	
14	Susan King	United States	16:04.68	
15	Joan Nesbit	United States	16:08.50	
16	Albertina Dias	Portugal	17:06.36	

=== Marathon ===
July 5

Rank	Name	Nationality	Time	Notes
1st place, gold medalist(s)	Nadezhda Gumerova	Soviet Union	2:33:09	
2nd place, silver medalist(s)	Irina Bogacheva	Soviet Union	2:34:09	
3rd place, bronze medalist(s)	Tatyana Gridneva	Soviet Union	2:34:40	
4	Irina Petrova	Soviet Union	2:35:07	
5	Yekaterina Khromenkova	Soviet Union	2:35:47	
6	Katy Schilly-Laetsch	United States	2:36:22	
7	Maureen Custy	United States	2:36:44	
8	Nadezhda Usmanova	Soviet Union	2:37:43	
9	Lucia Belyayeva	Soviet Union	2:38:01	
10	Julie Ishphording	United States	2:39:42	
11	Yelena Cukhlo	Soviet Union	2:39:50	
12	Irina Ruban	Soviet Union	2:40:00	
13	Tamara Sokolova	Soviet Union	2:40:17	
14	Tatyana Zuyeva	Soviet Union	2:40:52	
15	Tatyana Semenova	Soviet Union	2:41:47	
16	Valentina Shateyko	Soviet Union	2:42:25	
17	Lyubov Klochko	Soviet Union	2:43:06	
18	Lyubov Svirskaya	Soviet Union	2:43:59	
19	Tamara Brusinceva	Soviet Union	2:44:06	
20	Olga Durynina	Soviet Union	2:45:11	
21	Natalya Bardina	Soviet Union	2:45:25	
22	Natalya Sharapova	Soviet Union	2:46:01	
23	Anna Bykova	Soviet Union	2:47:12	
24	Valentina Lyakhova	Soviet Union	2:49:12	
25	Olga Maceluki	Soviet Union	2:49:57	
26	Lyudmila Voronina	Soviet Union	2:50:09	
27	Alevtina Chasova	Soviet Union	2:51:43	
28	Zoya Salmina	Soviet Union	2:52:33	
29	Alsu Minnikayeva	Soviet Union	2:54:25	
30	Lenina Pogrebnaya	Soviet Union	2:58:02	
31	Nadezhda Vasilyeva	Soviet Union	2:59:11	
32	Carmen Cardenas	Mexico	3:04:24	
33	Emmy Clark	United States	3:47:58	
34	Kerry Witters	United States	4:01:31	
35	Heather Geisford	United States	4:47:17	
36	Nancy Starling	United States	4:54:45	
37	Nicole Haddad	United States	4:59:00	
38	Linda Wittley	United States	5:14:57	
39	Cynthia Scarf	United States	5:14:57	
40	Wendy Schlenfeg	United States	5:30:11	
41	Suzanna Spens	United States	5:31:26	
42	Evelyn Havins	United States	5:31:27	
43	Patricia Brunetti	United States	5:32:22	
	Linda Smith	United States	DNF	
	Zoya Gavriluk	Soviet Union	DNF	
	Raisa Smekhnova	Soviet Union	DNF	
	Galina Ikonnikova	Soviet Union	DNF	

=== 100 meters hurdles ===
Heats – July 8
Wind:
Heat 1: +0.2 m/s, Heat 2: +0.4 m/s

Rank	Heat	Name	Nationality	Time	Notes
1	1	Ginka Zagorcheva	Bulgaria	12.67	Q
2	1	Laurence Elloy	France	12.69	Q
3	1	Cornelia Oschkenat	East Germany	12.80	Q
4	1	Yelena Politika	Soviet Union	12.95	q
5	1	Benita Fitzgerald-Brown	United States	13.04	
1	2	Yordanka Donkova	Bulgaria	12.51	Q
2	2	Kerstin Knabe	East Germany	12.80	Q
3	2	Vera Akimova	Soviet Union	12.83	Q
4	2	Nataliya Grigoryeva	Soviet Union	12.86	q
5	2	Patricia Lombardo	Italy	13.19	
-	2	Stephanie Hightower	United States	DNF	

Final – July 8
Wind:
+0.4 m/s

Rank	Name	Nationality	Time	Notes
1st place, gold medalist(s)	Yordanka Donkova	Bulgaria	12.40	
2nd place, silver medalist(s)	Cornelia Oschkenat	East Germany	12.62	
3rd place, bronze medalist(s)	Ginka Zagorcheva	Bulgaria	12.72	
4	Laurence Elloy	France	12.75	
5	Nataliya Grigoryeva	Soviet Union	12.86	
6	Kerstin Knabe	East Germany	12.86	
7	Vera Akimova	Soviet Union	12.91	
8	Yelena Politika	Soviet Union	12.97	

=== 400 meters hurdles ===
July 7

Rank	Heat	Name	Nationality	Time	Notes
1st place, gold medalist(s)	2	Marina Stepanova	Soviet Union	53.81	
2nd place, silver medalist(s)	2	Cristeana Matei	Romania	54.55	
3rd place, bronze medalist(s)	1	Ellen Fiedler	East Germany	54.80	
4	2	Margarita Khromova	Soviet Union	55.08	
5	1	Yelena Goncharova	Soviet Union	55.34	
6	2	Judi Brown-King	United States	56.06	
7	1	Sandra Farmer	Jamaica	56.28	
8	2	Schowonda Williams	United States	56.83	
9	1	Pilavullakandy Usha	India	57.90	

=== 4 × 100 meters relay ===
July 9

Rank	Lane	Nation	Competitors	Time	Notes
1st place, gold medalist(s)	4	United States	Michelle Finn, Diane Williams, Randy Givens, Evelyn Ashford	42.12	
2nd place, silver medalist(s)	3	Soviet Union "A"	Olga Zolotaryova, Maya Azarashvili, Irina Slyusar, Elvira Barbashina	42.27	
	5	Soviet Union "B"	Olga Kosakova, Oksana Kovaleva, Tatyana Chebykina, Irina Privalova	DQ	

=== 4 × 400 meters relay ===
July 8

Rank	Nation	Competitors	Time	Notes
1st place, gold medalist(s)	United States	Chandra Cheeseborough, Brenda Cliette, Lillie Leatherwood-King, Diane Dixon	3:21.22	
2nd place, silver medalist(s)	Soviet Union	Marina Stepanova, Mariya Pinigina, Lyudmila Dzhigalova, Olga Vladykina	3:21.99	

=== 10 kilometers walk ===
July 7

Rank	Name	Nationality	Time	Notes
1st place, gold medalist(s)	Kerry Saxby	Australia	45:08.13	
2nd place, silver medalist(s)	Guan Ping	China	45:56.50	
3rd place, bronze medalist(s)	Aleksandra Grigoryeva	Soviet Union	46:00.27	
4	Lidia Levandovskaya	Soviet Union	46:11.21	
5	Vera Prudnikova	Soviet Union	46:20.18	
6	Yelena Rodionova	Soviet Union	46:41.08	
7	Monika Gunnarsson	Sweden	47:02.65	
8	Olga Krishtop	Soviet Union	47:21.47	
9	Sue Cook	Australia	47:29.30	
10	Vera Osipova	Soviet Union	47:35.45	
11	Galina Yezhova	Soviet Union	47:59.61	
12	Yelena Kuznetsova	Soviet Union	48:23.78	
13	Ann Peel	Canada	48:34.27	
14	Tatyana Krivokhiazha	Soviet Union	48:46.83	
15	Sirkka Oikarfnen	Finland	48:52.36	
17	Mariya Shupilo	Soviet Union	49:17.08	
18	Svetlana Kaburkina	Soviet Union	49:32.20	
19	Zure Mustafyeva	Soviet Union	49:40.49	
20	Irina Emeliyanova	Soviet Union	50:00.89	
21	Tatyana Petrova	Soviet Union	50:08.81	
22	Sada Eidekete	Soviet Union	50:09.77	
23	Olga Kardopolceva	Soviet Union	50:20.16	
24	Roza Shaykhutdinova	Soviet Union	50:21.37	
25	Valentina Ksendfontova	Soviet Union	50:28.26	
26	Yuliya Lisnik	Soviet Union	50:51.40	
27	Yelena Veremeychuk	Soviet Union	50:51.75	
28	Irina Tolstik	Soviet Union	51:04.66	
29	Teresa Vail	Soviet Union	51:19.50	
30	Raiysa Sinyavina	Soviet Union	51:33.26	
31	Susan Liers	United States	52:00.61	
32	Svetlana Polovinko	Soviet Union	52:10.27	
33	Deborah Lawrence	United States	52:18.87	
34	Irina Lopardina	Soviet Union	53:09.25	
35	Svetlana Kashina	Soviet Union	53:31.78	
36	Tamara Aleksandrova	Soviet Union	54:23.24	
37	Lyudmila Mayorova	Soviet Union	57:11.87	
38	Scute Lapinskaya	Soviet Union	57:26.60	
	Nadezhda Prudnikova	Soviet Union	DNF	
	Natalya Dmitrochenko	Soviet Union	DNF	
	Marina Andreyeva	Soviet Union	DNF	
	Svetlana Vasilyeva	Soviet Union	DNF	
	Nina Fesenko	Soviet Union	DNF	
	Yelena Kovner	Soviet Union	DNF	
	Nina Mushinkova	Soviet Union	DNF	
	Natalya Jaroshenko	Soviet Union	DNF	
	Alfiya Ahmetzhanova	Soviet Union	DNF	
	Natalya Spiridonova	Soviet Union	DQ	
	Irina Straksova	Soviet Union	DQ	
	Mariya Vasilko	Soviet Union	DQ	
	Rimma Makarova	Soviet Union	DQ	
	Valentina Afanasyeva	Soviet Union	DQ	
	Lyubov Teleman	Soviet Union	DQ	
	Irina Shubina	Soviet Union	DQ	

=== High jump ===
July 7

Rank	Name	Nationality	Result	Notes
1st place, gold medalist(s)	Stefka Kostadinova	Bulgaria	2.03	
2nd place, silver medalist(s)	Olga Turchak	Soviet Union	2.01	
3rd place, bronze medalist(s)	Svetlana Isaeva	Bulgaria	1.96	
4	Tamara Bykova	Soviet Union	1.96	
5	Susanne Helm	East Germany	1.96	
6	Galina Brigadnaya	Soviet Union	1.96	
7	Andrea Binias	East Germany	1.89	
8	Louise Ritter	United States	1.89	
9	Larisa Kositsyna	Soviet Union	1.89	
10	Jan Chesbro	United States	1.80	

=== Long jump ===
July 7

Rank	Name	Nationality	Result	Notes
1st place, gold medalist(s)	Galina Chistyakova	Soviet Union	7.27	
2nd place, silver medalist(s)	Yelena Belevskaya	Soviet Union	7.17	
3rd place, bronze medalist(s)	Irina Valyukevich	Soviet Union	7.07	
4	Vali Ionescu	Romania	6.91	
5	Carol Lewis	United States	6.90	
6	Helga Radtke	East Germany	6.86	
7	Larisa Berezhnaya	Soviet Union	6.69	
8	Lyudmila Ninova	Bulgaria	6.44	
9	Sheila Echols	United States	6.44	

=== Shot put ===
July 7

Rank	Name	Nationality	Result	Notes
1st place, gold medalist(s)	Natalya Lisovskaya	Soviet Union	21.37	
2nd place, silver medalist(s)	Natalya Akhrimenko	Soviet Union	20.33	
3rd place, bronze medalist(s)	Mihaela Loghin	Romania	19.89	
4	Marina Antonyuk	Soviet Union	19.32	
5	Svetlana Mitkova	Bulgaria	19.10	
6	Danguolė Bimbaitė	Soviet Union	19.09	
7	Grit Haupt	East Germany	18.81	
8	Bonnie Dasse	United States	18.33	
9	Ramona Pagel	United States	17.47	
10	Cong Yuzhen	China	17.33	

=== Discus throw ===
July 9

Rank	Name	Nationality	Result	Notes
1st place, gold medalist(s)	Tsvetanka Khristova	Bulgaria	69.54	
2nd place, silver medalist(s)	Martina Hellmann	East Germany	69.04	
3rd place, bronze medalist(s)	Diana Sachse	East Germany	68.46	
4	Ellina Zvereva	Soviet Union	68.34	
5	Lyubov Zverkova	Soviet Union	64.44	
6	Svetlana Mitkova	Bulgaria	62.88	
7	Galina Yermakova	Soviet Union	62.86	
8	Larisa Korotkevich	Soviet Union	59.88	
9	Carol Cady	United States	59.68	
10	Annet Khorina	United States	58.72	
11	Hou Xuemei	China	56.80	
12	Ramona Pagel	United States	53.72	
13	Pia Iacovo	United States	51.30	

=== Javelin throw ===
July 8

Rank	Name	Nationality	Result	Notes
1st place, gold medalist(s)	Petra Felke	East Germany	70.78	
2nd place, silver medalist(s)	Irina Kostyuchenkova	Soviet Union	61.28	
3rd place, bronze medalist(s)	Natalya Yermolovich	Soviet Union	60.58	
4	Olga Gavrilova	Soviet Union	59.48	
5	Zinaida Gavrilina	Soviet Union	57.96	
6	Donna Mayhew	United States	56.18	
7	Karyn Szarkowski	United States	50.44	

=== Heptathlon ===
July 6–7

The highest mark recorded in each event is highlighted in yellow

Rank	Athlete	Nationality	100m H	HJ	SP	200m	LJ	JT	800m	Points	Notes
1st place, gold medalist(s)	Jackie Joyner	United States	12.85	1.88	14.76	23.00	7.01	49.86	2:10.02	7148	WR
2nd place, silver medalist(s)	Sibylle Thiele	East Germany	13.14	1.76	16.00	24.18	6.62	45.74	2:15.30	6635	
3rd place, bronze medalist(s)	Natalya Shubenkova	Soviet Union	13.23	1.70	13.94	23.67	6.61	45.88	2:03.61	6631	
4	Sabine Paetz	East Germany	13.11	1.73	15.67	24.13	6.40	42.57		6456	
5	Marianna Maslennikova	Soviet Union	13.41	1.88	11.84	23.40	6.38		2:06.09	6416	
6	Emilia Dimitrova	Bulgaria	13.73			23.17			2:09.85	6403	
7	Vaida Rushkite	Soviet Union	13.34		14.63					6349	
8	Larisa Nikitina	Soviet Union						52.52		6285	
9	Marion Vezer	East Germany	13.73	1.85		24.43	6.45			6141	
10	Ines Shultz	East Germany							2:07.25	6109	
11	Cindy Greiner	United States	13.54			24.24				6095	
12	Svetlana Filatyeva	Soviet Union								6091	
13	Yelena Davydova	Soviet Union								6053	
14	Katrin Hochrien	East Germany	13.97	1.85		24.23				6003	
15	Kristine Tånnander	Sweden								5456	
16	Monica Westén	Sweden								5365	
17	Lana Zimmerman	United States	14.48						2:09.64	4718	
	Anke Behmer	East Germany	13.44	1.85	14.04	23.41	6.55	37.30	DNS	DNF	
	Jane Frederick	United States	13.63	1.85				47.70	DNS	DNF	
