= Athletics at the 1986 Goodwill Games =

- The Games opening ceremony at the main stadium
- Dates: July 1986
- Host city: Moscow, Soviet Union
- Venue: Moscow Olympic Stadium
- Events: 42
- Participation: ? athletes from ? nations

At the 1986 Goodwill Games, the athletics competition was held in July 1986 at the Olympic Stadium in Moscow, Soviet Union. A total of 42 events were contested, of which 23 by male and 19 by female athletes.

In contrast to other major athletics competitions, the Goodwill Games operated an invitational policy, which meant that there were no qualifying stage of the events and the contests operated on a single or double final format. The inaugural athletics competition brought two new world records: Sergey Bubka cleared 6.01 m for a new pole vault record and Jackie Joyner improved the women's heptathlon record to 7148 points. In the 100 metres races, Ben Johnson gained his first international victory over Carl Lewis while Evelyn Ashford pipped Heike Drechsler to the gold in the women's race.

The Soviet Union dominated the medal table, winning 50% more medals than the United States.

== Records ==
Name	Event	Country	Record	Type
Sergey Bubka	Pole vault	Soviet Union	6.01 m	WR
Jackie Joyner	Heptathlon	United States	7148 pts	WR
Key:WR — World record • AR — Area record • GR — Games record • NR — National record

== Medal summary ==
=== Men ===
Event	Gold		Silver		Bronze	
100 metres	Ben Johnson (CAN)	9.95	Chidi Imoh (NGR)	10.04	Carl Lewis (USA)	10.06
200 metres	Floyd Heard (USA)	20.12	Dwayne Evans (USA)	20.45	Wallace Spearmon Sr. (USA)	20.49
400 metres	Antonio McKay (USA)	44.98	Clarence Daniel (USA)	45.11	Darrell Robinson (USA)	45.15
800 metres	Johnny Gray (USA)	1:46.52	Stanley Redwine (USA)	1:46.89	Sammy Tirop (KEN)	1:47.05
1500 metres	Pavel Yakovlev (URS)	3:39.86	Igor Lotaryov (URS)	3:40.18	Steve Scott (USA)	3:40.31
5000 metres	Doug Padilla (USA)	13:46.65	Terry Brahm (USA)	13:47.11	Evgeni Ignatov (BUL)	13:47.17
10,000 metres	Domingos Castro (POR)	28:11.21	Gerard Donakowski (USA)	28:11.87	Dionísio Castro (POR)	28:12.04
110 metres hurdles	Greg Foster (USA)	13.25	Andrey Prokofyev (URS)	13.28	Keith Talley (USA)	13.31
400 metres hurdles	Edwin Moses (USA)	47.94	Aleksandr Vasilyev (URS)	48.24	Dave Patrick (USA)	48.59
3000 metres steeplechase	Hagen Melzer (GDR)	8:23.06	Henry Marsh (USA)	8:23.92	Nikolay Matyushenko (URS)	8:25.73
4×100 metres relay	United States (USA); Lee McRae; Floyd Heard; Harvey Glance; Carl Lewis	37.98	Soviet Union (URS) "A"; Aleksandr Yevgenyev; Vladimir Muravyov; Nikolai Yushmanov; Viktor Bryzhin	38.19	Soviet Union (URS) "B"; Aleksandr Kutepov; Roman Osipenko; Dmitry Bartenev; Sergey Klyonov	40.22
4×400 metres relay	Soviet Union (URS); Vladimir Krylov; Vladimir Prosin; Vladimir Volodko; Aleksandr Kurochkin	3:01.25	United States (USA); Walter McCoy; Clarence Daniel; Danny Everett; Darrell Robinson	3:01.47	Ivory Coast (CIV); Djétenan Kouadio; Akissi Kpidi; René Djédjémel Mélédjé; Gabriel Tiacoh	3:13.51
Marathon	Belayneh Dinsamo (ETH)	2:14:42	Igor Broslavskiy (URS)	2:15:24	Yakov Tolstikov (URS)	2:16:22
20 km walk	Aleksey Pershin (URS)	1:23:29	Aleksandr Boyarshinov (URS)	1:23:36	Yevgeniy Misyulya (URS)	1:23:53
High jump	Doug Nordquist (USA)	2.34 m	Igor Paklin (URS)	2.32 m	Sorin Matei (ROM)	2.32 m
Pole vault	Sergey Bubka (URS)	6.01 m WR	Radion Gataullin (URS)	5.80 m	Earl Bell (USA)	5.75 m
Long jump	Robert Emmiyan (URS)	8.61 m	Larry Myricks (USA)	8.41 m	Sergey Layevskiy (URS)	8.20 m
Triple jump	Mike Conley (USA)	17.69 m	Khristo Markov (BUL)	17.35 m	Mykola Musiyenko (URS)	17.33 m
Shot put	Sergey Smirnov (URS)	21.79 m	Sergey Gavryushin (URS)	21.09 m	John Brenner (USA)	20.62 m
Discus throw	Romas Ubartas (URS)	67.12 m	Dmitry Kovtsun (URS)	64.24 m	Knut Hjeltnes (NOR)	64.02 m
Hammer throw	Yuriy Sedykh (URS)	84.72 m	Sergey Litvinov (URS)	84.64 m	Benjaminas Viluckis (URS)	80.04 m
Javelin throw	Tom Petranoff (USA)	83.46 m	Heino Puuste (URS)	83.12 m	Sergey Gavras (URS)	81.44 m
Decathlon	Grigoriy Degtyaryov (URS)	8322 pts	Oleksandr Apaychev (URS)	8244 pts	Aleksey Lyakh (URS)	8082 pts

=== Women ===
Event	Gold		Silver		Bronze	
100 metres	Evelyn Ashford (USA)	10.91	Heike Drechsler (GDR)	10.91	Elvira Barbashina (URS)	11.12
200 metres	Pam Marshall (USA)	22.12	Ewa Kasprzyk (POL)	22.13	Elvira Barbashina (URS)	22.27
400 metres	Olga Vladykina (URS)	49.96	Mariya Pinigina (URS)	50.29	Lillie Leatherwood (USA)	50.47
800 metres	Lyubov Gurina (URS)	1:57.52	Nadezhda Zabolotneva (URS)	1:57.54	Mitica Junghiatu (ROM)	1:57.87
1500 metres	Tatyana Samolenko (URS)	4:05.50	Ravilya Agletdinova (URS)	4:06.14	Svetlana Kitova (URS)	4:07.21
3000 metres	Mariana Stanescu (ROM)	8:38.83	Svetlana Ulmasova (URS)	8:39.19	Regina Chistyakova (URS)	8:39.25
5000 metres	Olga Bondarenko (URS)	15:03.51	Svetlana Ulmasova (URS)	15:05.50	Cindy Bremser (USA)	15:11.78
100 metres hurdles	Yordanka Donkova (BUL)	12.40	Cornelia Oschkenat (GDR)	12.62	Ginka Zagorcheva (BUL)	12.72
400 metres hurdles	Marina Stepanova (URS)	53.81	Cristeana Matei (ROM)	54.55	Ellen Fiedler (GDR)	54.80
4×100 metres relay	United States (USA); Michelle Finn; Diane Williams; Randy Givens; Evelyn Ashford	42.12	Soviet Union (URS); Olga Zolotaryova; Maia Azarashvili; Irina Slyusar; Elvira Barbashina	42.27	Only two teams finished	
4×400 metres relay	United States (USA); Chandra Cheeseborough; Brenda Cliette; Lillie Leatherwood; Diane Dixon	3:21.22	Soviet Union (URS); Marina Stepanova; Mariya Pinigina; Lyudmyla Dzhyhalova; Olga Vladykina	3:21.99	Only two teams started	
Marathon	Nadezhda Gumerova (URS)	2:33:55	Irina Bogacheva (URS)	2:34:09	Tatyana Gridneva (URS)	2:34:40
10 km walk	Kerry Saxby (AUS)	45:08.13	Guan Ping (CHN)	45:56.50	Aleksandra Grigoryeva (URS)	46:00.27
High jump	Stefka Kostadinova (BUL)	2.03 m	Olga Turchak (URS)	2.01 m	Tamara Bykova (URS); Svetlana Isaeva (BUL)	1.96 m
Long jump	Galina Chistyakova (URS)	7.27 m	Yelena Belevskaya (URS)	7.17 m	Irina Valyukevich (URS)	7.07 m
Shot put	Natalya Lisovskaya (URS)	21.37 m	Natalya Akhrimenko (URS)	20.33 m	Mihaela Loghin (ROM)	19.89 m
Discus throw	Tsvetanka Khristova (BUL)	69.54 m	Martina Hellmann (GDR)	69.04 m	Diana Sachse (GDR)	68.46 m
Javelin throw	Petra Felke (GDR)	70.78 m	Irina Kostyuchenkova (URS)	61.28 m	Natalya Yermolovich (URS)	60.58 m
Heptathlon	Jackie Joyner (USA)	7148 pts WR	Sibylle Thiele (GDR)	6635 pts	Natalya Shubenkova (URS)	6631 pts

== Medal table ==
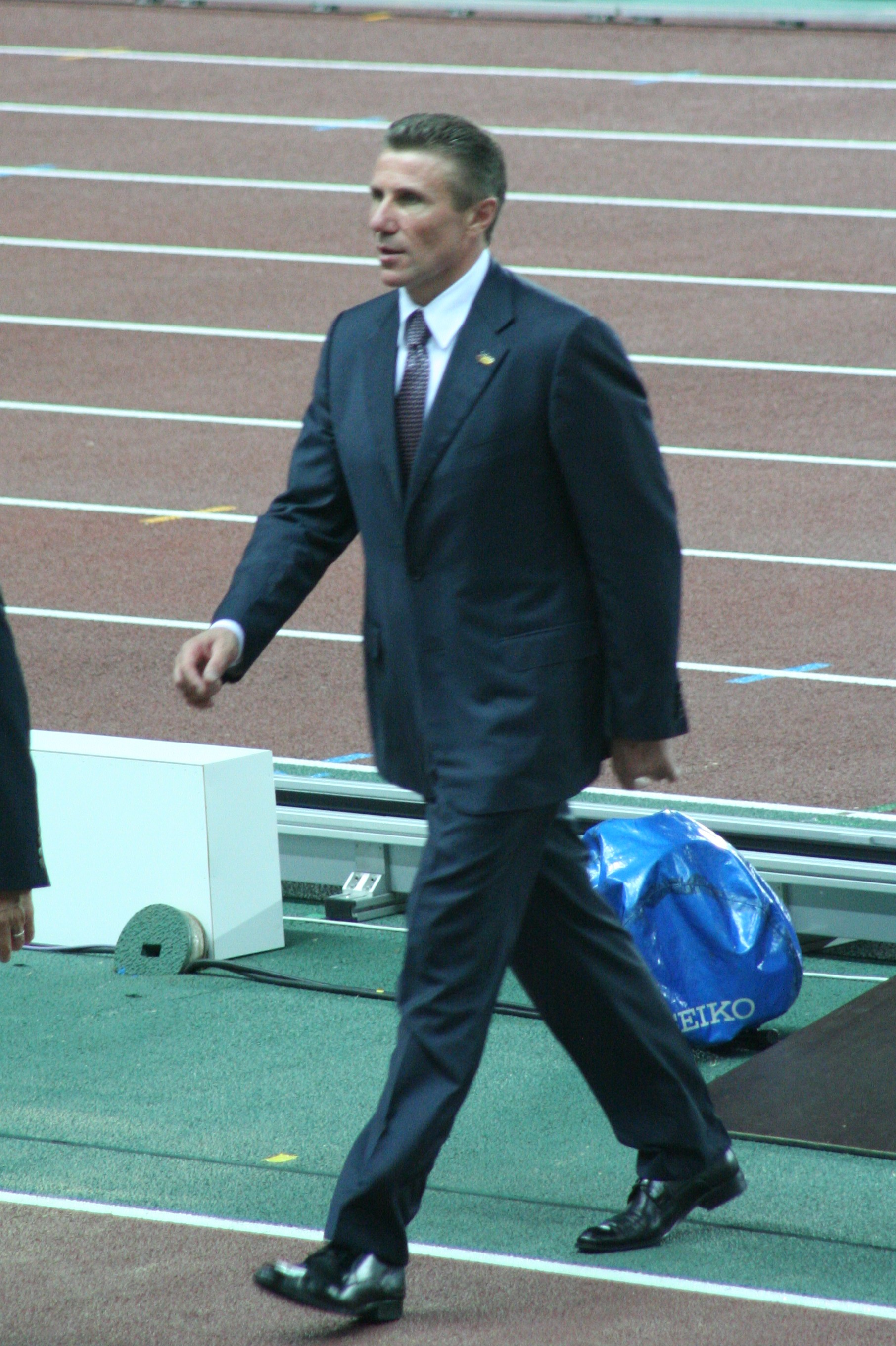
Sergey Bubka raised the pole vault world record to win gold for the USSR.

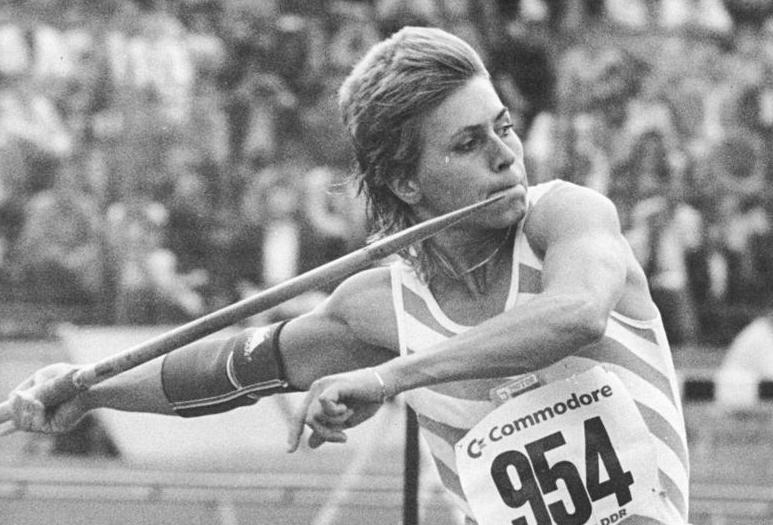
Petra Felke won East Germany's only women's gold medal in the javelin.

* Host nation (Soviet Union)

Rank	Nation	Gold	Silver	Bronze	Total
1	Soviet Union (URS)*	17	25	19	61
2	United States (USA)	15	8	10	33
3	Bulgaria (BUL)	3	1	3	7
4	East Germany (GDR)	2	4	2	8
5	Romania (ROM)	1	1	3	5
6	Portugal (POR)	1	0	1	2
7	Australia (AUS)	1	0	0	1
7	Canada (CAN)	1	0	0	1
7	Ethiopia (ETH)	1	0	0	1
10	China (CHN)	0	1	0	1
10	Nigeria (NGR)	0	1	0	1
10	Poland (POL)	0	1	0	1
13	Ivory Coast (CIV)	0	0	1	1
13	Kenya (KEN)	0	0	1	1
13	Norway (NOR)	0	0	1	1
Totals (15 entries)		42	42	41	125
