= List of Soviet records in athletics =

The following are the national records in athletics for the Soviet Union. These records were maintained by the Soviet Athletics Federation during the country's existence until its dissolution in 1991. The Soviet Union coincided with a successful period in athletics for the region, resulting in many national records being world and European records as well. Athletes from the Republics of the Soviet Union were eligible for national records. Many of the records have been improved upon since by athletes from the post-Soviet states.

== Outdoor ==
=== Men ===
Event	Mark	Republic	Athlete	Date	Competition	Location	Note
100 m	10.07 (±0.0 m/s)	Ukrainian SSR	Valeriy Borzov	31 August 1972	Olympic Games	Munich, West Germany	
200 m	20.00 (±0.0 m/s)	Ukrainian SSR	Valeriy Borzov	4 September 1972	Olympic Games	Munich, West Germany	
400 m	44.60	Russian SFSR	Viktor Markin	30 July 1980	Olympic Games	Moscow, Soviet Union	
800 m	1:44.10	Russian SFSR	Vladimir Graudyn	2 July 1988	Bislett Games	Oslo, Norway	
1000 m	2:16.0 h	Russian SFSR	Vladimir Malozemlin	11 June 1981		Kiev, Soviet Union	
1500 m	3:34.49	Russian SFSR	Igor Lotaryov	30 August 1985	Memorial Van Damme	Brussels, Belgium	
3000 m	7:42.0 h	Russian SFSR	Mikhail Dasko	20 August 1989	ASV Sports Festival	Cologne, West Germany	
5000 m	13:11.99	Russian SFSR	Valeriy Abramov	9 September 1981	Rieti Meeting	Rieti, Italy	
10,000 m	27:31.5 h	Lithuanian SSR	Aleksandras Antipovas	29 August 1978		Prague, Czechoslovakia	
20,000 m	59:02.0 h	Russian SFSR	Rashid Sharafetdinov	2 May 1971		Leningrad, Soviet Union	
Hour run	20,400 m	Kazakh SSR	Nikolay Penzin	15 August 1977		Moscow, USSR	
25,000 m	1:17:34,0	Russian SFSR	Albert Ivanov	27 September 1955		Moscow, USSR	
25 km (road)	1:15:22	Russian SFSR	Vladimir Merkushin	30 April 1978		Helsinki, Finland	
30,000 m	1:31:39,0	Ukrainian SSR	Anatoly Skrypnik	1972			
30 km (road)	1:29:55	Russian SFSR	Leonid Tikhonov	September 1988	Run Pushkin - Leningrad	Leningrad, USSR	
Marathon	2:09:17	Russian SFSR	Yakov Tolstikov	21 April 1991	London Marathon	London, United Kingdom	
100 km (road)	6:24:24	Russian SFSR	Konstantin Santalov	19 October 1991	100 km of Amiens	Amiens, France	
24 hours	266,050 m	Russian SFSR	Alexander Komissarenko	September 1982		Tula, Soviet Union	
48 hours	427,526 m	Russian SFSR	Valery Gubar	9 May 1991	Surgères 48 Hour Race	Surgères, France	
6 days	836,650 m	Russian SFSR	Rustem Giniatullin	26 October - 1 November 1991		Odessa, Soviet Union	
110 m hurdles	13.20 (+1.8 m/s)	Russian SFSR	Aleksandr Markin	11 June 1988	Brothers Znamensky Memorial	Leningrad, Soviet Union	
400 m hurdles	47.92	Byelorussian SSR	Aleksandr Vasilyev	17 August 1985	European Cup "A" Final	Moscow, Soviet Union	
2000 m steeplechase	5:27.89	Ukrainian SSR	Nikolay Matyushenko	29 July 1989		Ostrava, Czechoslovakia	
3000 m steeplechase	8:15.54	Russian SFSR	Ivan Konovalov	18 August 1985		Moscow, Soviet Union	
High jump	2.41 m	Kyrgyz SSR	Igor Paklin	4 September 1985	Universiade	Kobe, Japan	
Pole vault	6.10 m	Ukrainian SSR	Sergey Bubka	5 August 1991	MAI Gala	Malmö, Sweden	
Long jump	8.86 m (+1.9 m/s) AR	Armenian SSR	Robert Emmiyan	22 May 1987		Tsaghkadzor, Soviet Union	
Triple jump	17.90 m (+1.0 m/s)	Ukrainian SSR	Volodymyr Inozemtsev	20 June 1990		Bratislava, Czechoslovakia	
Shot put	22.24 m	Russian SFSR	Sergey Smirnov	21 June 1988	USSR vs GDR match	Tallinn, Soviet Union	
Discus throw	71.86 m	Russian SFSR	Yuriy Dumchev	29 June 1983	Spartakiade	Moscow, Soviet Union	
Hammer throw	86.74 m WR	Russian SFSR	Yuriy Sedykh	30 August 1986	European Championships	Stuttgart, West Germany	
Javelin throw	85.16 m	Kazakh SSR	Viktor Yevsyukov	21 June 1987		Karl-Marx-Stadt, East Germany	
Javelin throw (old model)	94.20 m	Estonian SSR	Heino Puuste	5 June 1983		Birmingham, United Kingdom	
Decathlon	8709 pts	Ukrainian SSR	Oleksandr Apaychev	2–3 June 1984		Neubrandenburg, East Germany	
Decathlon	10.96 (100 m) , 7.57 m (Long Jump) , 16.00 m (Shot Put) , 1.97 m (High Jump) , 48.72 (400 m) / 13.93 (110 m Hurdles) , 48.00 m (Discus Throw) , 4.90 m (Pole Vault) , 72.24 m (Javelin Throw) , 4:26.51 (1500 m)						
10,000 m walk (track)	38:18.0 h	Lithuanian SSR	Valdas Kazlauskas	18 September 1983		Moscow, Soviet Union	
20,000 m walk (track)	1:19:22.5	Russian SFSR	Aleksey Pershin	7 May 1988		Bergen, Norway	
20 km walk (road)	1:18:20	Russian SFSR	Andrey Perlov	26 May 1990		Moscow, Soviet Union	
50,000 m walk (track)	3:46:11.0	Ukrainian SSR	Nikolay Udovenko	3 October 1980		Uzhhorod, Soviet Union	
50 km walk (road)	3:37:41	Russian SFSR	Andrey Perlov	4 August 1989		Leningrad, Soviet Union	
4 × 100 m relay	38.02	Soviet Union	Aleksandr Yevgenyev; Viktor Bryzhin; Vladimir Muravyov; Vladimir Krylov	6 September 1987	World Championship	Rome, Italy	
4 × 200 m relay	1:23.67	Soviet Union	Vladimir Muravyov; Andrey Shlyapnikov; Vitaliy Fedotov; Viktor Burakov	20 June 1981		Bourges, France	
4 × 400 m relay	3:00.16	Soviet Union	Sergey Lovachov; Yevgeniy Lomtyev; Aleksandr Kurochkin; Viktor Markin	18 August 1984	Friendship Games	Moscow, Soviet Union	
4 × 800 m relay	7:07.4 h	Soviet Union	Leonid Masunov; Alexander Kostetskiy; Vasily Matveev; Victor Kalinkin	5 August 1984		Moscow, Soviet Union	
4 × 1500 m relay	14:45.63	Soviet Union	Anatoly Kalutsky; Pavel Yakovlev; Anatoly Legeda; Igor Lotaryov	4 August 1985		Leningrad, Soviet Union	

=== Women ===
Event	Mark	Republic	Athlete	Date	Competition	Location	Note
100 m	10.87 X (Note: result not ratified by World Athletics)	Russian SFSR	Lyudmila Kondratyeva	3 June 1980		Leningrad, Soviet Union	
100 m	10.98 (+0.1 m/s)	Russian SFSR	Marina Zhirova	17 August 1985		Moscow, Soviet Union	
200 m	22.19 (+1.5 m/s)	Russian SFSR	Natalya Bochina	30 July 1980	Olympic Games	Moscow, Soviet Union	
400 m	48.27	Ukrainian SSR	Olha Bryzhina	6 October 1985	World Cup	Canberra, Australia	
800 m	1:53.43	Ukrainian SSR	Nadiya Olizarenko	27 July 1980	Olympic Games	Moscow, Soviet Union	
1000 m	2:30.6 h	Russian SFSR	Tatyana Providokhina	20 August 1978		Podolsk, Soviet Union	
1500 m	3:52.47 AR	Russian SFSR	Tatyana Kazankina	13 August 1980	Weltklasse Zürich	Zürich, Switzerland	
Mile	4:15.8 h	Russian SFSR	Natalya Artyomova	5 August 1984		Leningrad, Soviet Union	
2000 m	5:28.72	Russian SFSR	Tatyana Kazankina	4 August 1984		Moscow, Soviet Union	
3000 m	8:22.62	Russian SFSR	Tatyana Kazankina	26 August 1984		Leningrad, Soviet Union	
5000 m	14:54.08	Russian SFSR	Natalya Artyomova	9 September 1985		Podolsk, Soviet Union	
10,000 m	30:57.21	Russian SFSR	Olga Bondarenko	30 August 1986	European Championships	Stuttgart, West Germany	
15 km (road)	48:44	Russian SFSR	Nadezhda Ilyina	13 October 1991		Nieuwegein, Netherlands	
30 km (road)	1:44:31+	Kazakh SSR	Zoya Ivanova	15 November 1987		Tokyo, Japan	
Marathon	2:27:05	Ukrainian SSR	Tatyana Polovinskaya	23 September 1988	Olympic Games	Seoul, South Korea	
100 km (road)	8:05:47	Russian SFSR	Nadezhda Gumerova	26 May 1991	IAU 100 km World Championships	Faenza, Italy	
24 hours	222,000 m	Latvian SSR	Tamara Merzlikina	27 May 1989	24 hours of Mitersill	Mittersill, Austria	
6-day run	506 km	Russian SFSR	Lidiya Ivanova	26 October – 1 November 1991		Odessa, Soviet Union	
100 m hurdles	12.28 (+1.8 m/s)	Russian SFSR	Lyudmila Narozhilenko	11 July 1991		Kiev, Soviet Union	
400 m hurdles	52.94	Russian SFSR	Marina Stepanova	17 September 1986		Tashkent, Soviet Union	
2000 m steeplechase	6:16.41	Russian SFSR	Marina Pluzhnikova	2 August 1988		Kiev, Soviet Union	
High jump	2.05 m	Russian SFSR	Tamara Bykova	22 June 1984		Kiev, Soviet Union	
Long jump	7.52 m (+1.4 m/s) WR	Russian SFSR	Galina Chistyakova	11 June 1988	Brothers Znamensky Memorial	Leningrad, Soviet Union	
Triple jump	14.95 m (−0.2 m/s)	Ukrainian SSR	Inessa Kravets	10 June 1991	Brothers Znamensky Memorial	Moscow, Soviet Union	
Shot put	22.63 m WR	Russian SFSR	Natalya Lisovskaya	7 June 1987	Brothers Znamensky Memorial	Moscow, Soviet Union	
Discus throw	73.28 m	Russian SFSR	Galina Savinkova	9 September 1984	Soviet Championships	Donetsk, Soviet Union	
Javelin throw	70.08 m	Uzbek SSR	Tatyana Biryulina	2 July 1980		Podolsk, Soviet Union	
Heptathlon	7007 pts	Russian SFSR	Larisa Nikitina	10–11 June 1989	Soviet Championships	Bryansk, Soviet Union	
Heptathlon	13.40 (100 m Hurdles), 1.89 m (High Jump), 16.45 m (Shot Put), 23.97 (200 m), 53.94 m (Javelin Throw), 2.15.31 (800 m)						
5000 m walk (track)	20:50.6 h	Russian SFSR	Alina Ivanova	15 July 1989		Bryansk, Soviet Union	
5 km walk (road)	20:36	Russian SFSR	Alina Ivanova	21 April 1991		Hospitalet de Llobregat, Spain	
10,000 m walk (track)	41:56.23 WR	Russian SFSR	Nadezhda Ryashkina	24 July 1990	Goodwill Games	Seattle, United States	
10 km walk (road)	42:16	Russian SFSR	Alina Ivanova	27 May 27		Novopolotsk, Soviet Union	
20 km walk (road)	1:30:42	Byelorussian SSR	Olga Kardopoltseva	29 April 1990		Kaliningrad, Soviet Union	
4 × 100 m relay	42.00	Soviet Union	Antonina Pobyubko; Natalya Pomoshchnikova-Voronova; Marina Zhirova; Elvira Barbashina	17 August 1985		Moscow, Soviet Union	
4 × 400 m relay	3:15.17 WR	Soviet Union	Tatyana Ledovskaya; Olga Nazarova; Mariya Pinigina; Olha Bryzhina	1 October 1988	Olympic Games	Seoul, South Korea	
4 × 800 m relay	7:50.17 WR	Soviet Union	Nadiya Olizarenko; Lyubov Gurina; Lyudmila Borisova; Irina Podyalovskaya	5 August 1984		Moscow, Soviet Union	
100 km relay	27:01:02	Soviet Union	Nadezhda Gumerova; Maria Ostrovskaya; Tamara Merzlikina	25 May 1991	IAU 100 km World Championships	Faenza, Italy	
