= Athletics at the 1985 Summer Universiade – Women's heptathlon =

The women's heptathlon event at the 1985 Summer Universiade was held at the Kobe Universiade Memorial Stadium in Kobe on 30 and 31 August 1985.

== Results ==
| Rank | Athlete | Nationality | 100m H | HJ | SP | 200m | LJ | JT | 800m | Points | Notes |
|---|---|---|---|---|---|---|---|---|---|---|---|
| 1st place, gold medalist(s) | Małgorzata Nowak | Poland | 13.27w | 1.95 | 15.35 | 24.20 | 6.37w | 43.36 | 2:20.39 | 6616 | UR, NR |
| 2nd place, silver medalist(s) | Liliana Năstase | Romania | | | | | | | | 6313 | |
| 3rd place, bronze medalist(s) | Judy Simpson | Great Britain | | | | | | | | 6046 | |
| 4 | Corinne Schneider | Switzerland | | | | | | | | 6039 | |
| 5 | Birgit Dressel | West Germany | | | | | | | | 5890 | |
| 6 | Larisa Nikitina | Soviet Union | 14.23w | 1.77 | 14.55 | 26.07 | 5.53 | 45.20 | 2:28.70 | 5694 | |
| 7 | Jolanda Jones | United States | | | | | | | | 5463 | |
| | Isabelle Kaftandjian | France | 13.69 | 1.65 | 10.83 | 25.39 | NM | 38.14 | DNS | DNF | |
