= Athletics at the 1985 Summer Universiade – Women's long jump =

The women's long jump event at the 1985 Summer Universiade was held at the Kobe Universiade Memorial Stadium in Kobe on 3 and 4 September 1985.

== Medalists ==
Gold	Silver	Bronze
Irina Valyukevich; Soviet Union	Silvia Khristova; Bulgaria	Marieta Ilcu; Romania

== Results ==
=== Qualification ===
Rank	Group	Athlete	Nationality	Result	Notes
1	?	Irina Valyukevich	Soviet Union	7.00	
2	?	Monika Hirsch	West Germany	6.65	
3	?	Rita Heggli	Switzerland	6.59	
4	?	Eloína Echevarría	Cuba	6.43	
5	?	Silvia Khristova	Bulgaria	6.36	
6	?	Marieta Ilcu	Romania	6.36	
7	?	Géraldine Bonnin	France	6.32	
7	?	Ulrike Keller	West Germany	6.32	
9	?	Sabrina Williams	United States	6.27	
10	?	Wang Zhihui	China	6.23	
11	?	Alessandra Becatti	Italy	6.22	
12	?	Zhang Biyu	China	6.21	
13	?	Wendy Brown	United States	6.16	
13	?	Valy Ionescu	Romania	6.16	
15	?	Minako Isogai	Japan	6.14	
16	?	Kim Mi-sook	South Korea	6.13	
16	?	Carol Galloway	Canada	6.13	
18	?	Antonella Capriotti	Italy	5.93	
19	?	Tracy Smith	Canada	5.75	
20	?	Emilia Lenk	Mexico	5.62	

=== Final ===
Rank	Athlete	Nationality	Result	Notes
1st place, gold medalist(s)	Irina Valyukevich	Soviet Union	7.04	UR
2nd place, silver medalist(s)	Silvia Khristova	Bulgaria	6.62	
3rd place, bronze medalist(s)	Marieta Ilcu	Romania	6.61	
4	Eloína Echevarría	Cuba	6.58	
5	Monika Hirsch	West Germany	6.57	
6	Rita Heggli	Switzerland	6.41	
7	Géraldine Bonnin	France	6.39	
8	Ulrike Keller	West Germany	6.19	
9	Wang Zhihui	China	6.17	
10	Sabrina Williams	United States	6.16	
11	Alessandra Becatti	Italy	6.01	
12	Zhang Biyu	China	5.88	
