= Athletics at the 1983 Summer Universiade – Men's discus throw =

The men's discus throw event at the 1983 Summer Universiade was held at the Commonwealth Stadium in Edmonton, Canada on 7 and 8 July 1983.

The winning margin was a huge 6.14 metres which as of 2024 remains the only time the men's discus throw was won by more than five metres at these games.

== Medalists ==
Gold	Silver	Bronze
Luis Delís; Cuba	Dariusz Juzyszyn; Poland	Marco Bucci; Italy

== Results ==
=== Qualification ===
Rank	Athlete	Nationality	Result	Notes
1	Luis Delís	Cuba	67.28	UR
2	Marco Martino	Italy	59.66	
3	Konstantinos Georgakopoulos	Greece	59.50	
4	Dariusz Juzyszyn	Poland	58.96	
5	Rob Gray	Canada	57.34	
6	Marco Bucci	Italy	57.32	
7	Robert Weir	Great Britain	56.24	
8	Mike Carter	United States	54.84	
9	Li Weinan	China	54.60	
10	Randy Heisler	United States	53.16	
11	Jack Harkness	Canada	52.76	
12	Erik de Bruin	Netherlands	51.76	
13	Vahé Karabidjian	Lebanon	43.48	
14	César Sajche	Guatemala	32.48	

=== Final ===
Rank	Athlete	Nationality	Result	Notes
1st place, gold medalist(s)	Luis Delís	Cuba	69.46	UR
2nd place, silver medalist(s)	Dariusz Juzyszyn	Poland	63.32	
3rd place, bronze medalist(s)	Marco Bucci	Italy	60.62	
4	Marco Martino	Italy	60.24	
5	Konstantinos Georgakopoulos	Greece	59.32	
6	Robert Weir	Great Britain	58.40	
7	Li Weinan	China	57.84	
8	Randy Heisler	United States	57.48	
9	Rob Gray	Canada	57.46	
10	Jack Harkness	Canada	56.60	
11	Mike Carter	United States	54.66	
12	Óskar Jakobsson	Iceland	54.36	
	Erik de Bruin	Netherlands	DNS	
