= Athletics at the 1983 Summer Universiade – Women's heptathlon =

The women's heptathlon event at the 1983 Summer Universiade was held at the Commonwealth Stadium in Edmonton, Canada with the final on 6 and 7 July 1983.

== Results ==
The highest mark recorded in each event is highlighted in yellow.

| Rank | Athlete | Nationality | 100m H | HJ | SP | 200m | LJ | JT | 800m | Points | Notes |
|---|---|---|---|---|---|---|---|---|---|---|---|
| 1st place, gold medalist(s) | Yekaterina Smirnova | Soviet Union | 13.14 | 1.83 | 13.87 | 24.60 | 5.83 | 45.50 | 2:13.21 | 6350 | |
| 2nd place, silver medalist(s) | Sabine Everts | West Germany | 13.45 | 1.80 | 11.31 | | 6.61 | | | 6291 | |
| 3rd place, bronze medalist(s) | Judy Livermore | Great Britain | 13.38 | 1.83 | 14.09 | | 6.05 | | | 6184 | |
| 4 | Birgit Dressel | West Germany | 13.89 | 1.83 | 12.08 | | 6.08 | | | 6025 | |
| 5 | Corinne Schneider | Switzerland | 14.17 | 1.80 | 12.11 | | 5.89 | | | 5831 | |
| 6 | Elida Aveillé | Cuba | 13.95 | 1.68 | 12.21 | | 5.85 | | | 5717 | |
| 7 | Vivanne Antibe | France | 13.43 | 1.80 | 9.88 | 24.96 | 5.85 | 32.72 | 2:21.00 | 5700 | |
| 8 | Tanja Alston | United States | 14.51 | 1.80 | 13.32 | | 5.62 | | | 5611 | |
| 9 | Kimiko Tatsumi | Japan | 14.49 | 1.68 | 11.04 | | 5.81 | | | 5553 | |
| 10 | Ye Peisu | China | 14.40 | 1.83 | 12.15 | | 5.59 | | | 5421 | |
| 11 | Olga Verissimo | Brazil | 14.13 | 1.65 | 10.39 | | 5.48 | | | 5389 | |
| 12 | Denise Fillion | Canada | 14.94 | 1.74 | 9.86 | | 5.45 | | | 5384 | |
| 13 | Dalia Tayebi | Algeria | 15.10 | 1.68 | 10.49 | | 5.74 | | | 5316 | |
| 14 | Madeline de Jesús | Puerto Rico | 14.96 | 1.47 | 9.86 | | 5.15 | | | 5072 | |
| 15 | Emilia Lenk | Mexico | 16.41 | 1.53 | 10.20 | | 5.71 | | | 4764 | |
| 16 | Zeina Mina | Lebanon | 16.05 | 1.56 | 7.97 | | 4.79 | | | 4314 | |
| 17 | Ana Lucrecia Aragón | Guatemala | 17.02 | NM | 7.68 | | 4.67 | | | 3243 | |
| | Mila Kolyadina | Soviet Union | 14.23 | 1.74 | 14.67 | 25.33 | 5.77 | DNS | – | DNF | |
| | Jill Ross-Giffen | Canada | 14.07 | 1.71 | 11.27 | | | | | DNF | |
| | Lara Zimmerman | United States | 15.00 | 1.65 | 8.98 | | | | | DNF | |
