= Valyukevich =

Valyukevich is the name of:

- Gennadiy Valyukevich (1958–2019), Soviet triple jumper
- Irina Valyukevich (born 1959), Soviet long jumper, wife of Gennadiy
- Dmitrij Vaľukevič (born 1981), Belarusian-born Slovak triple jumper, son of Gennadiy and Irina
- Viktoriya Valyukevich (born 1982), Russian triple jumper, wife of Dmitrij
