= Marco Bucci =

Marco Bucci may refer to:

- Marco Bucci (politician), born 1959
- Marco Bucci (athlete), 1960–2013
