= Tirop =

Tirop is a surname. Notable people with the surname include:

- Agnes Tirop (1995–2021), Kenyan long-distance runner
- Amos Tirop Matui (born 1976), Kenyan long-distance and marathon runner
- Sammy Tirop (born 1959), Kenyan middle-distance runner
