= Doug Nordquist =

American high jumper

Personal information
- Born: December 20, 1958 (age 67) San Gabriel, California, United States
- Height: 1.93 m (6 ft 4 in)
- Weight: 79 kg (174 lb)

Sport
- Club: Tiger International
Medal record
Men's Athletics
Representing the United States
Goodwill Games
Gold medal – first place	1986 Moscow	High jump
Silver medal – second place	1990 Seattle	High jump

Douglas Nordquist (born December 20, 1958, in San Gabriel, California) is a retired male high jumper from the United States, who competed at the 1984 Summer Olympics where he ended up in fifth place with a jump of 2.29 metres, one place behind distant cousin Dwight Stones. He was TAC high jump champion in 1986 and 1988, and placed second at the 1984 Olympic Trials behind Stones. He competed for Sonora High School, finishing a three-way tie for third place at the 1977 CIF California State Meet. While at Fullerton Community College he won the 1979 California Community College Championships, Washington State University where he was coached by 1968 Olympian Rick Sloan. After graduation he was coached by Jim Kiefer and competed for and Tiger International. He was a practitioner of Washington State's specialized weight training for high jumpers He set his personal record of 2.36m while finishing second in a jumpoff at the USATF National Championships at Cerritos College in Norwalk, California on June 15, 1990. Alan Hankle and Athleticorp was his coach.

That jump currently ranks Nordquist tied as the 25th best performer in history. For his athletic achievements, Nordquist was inducted into the Washington State University Hall of Fame in 2015 and was an inaugural inductee to the Fullerton College Track and Field Wall of Fame in 2019.

Doug Nordquist was a highly decorated director for the California High School Entertainment Unit, winning first place awards with the band. Nordquist retired from teaching at the end of the 2019–2020 school year and was honored as the Whittier Teacher of the Year, an award previously given to his father in 1986.

His personal bests in the event are 2.36 metres outdoors (Norwalk 1990) and 2.31 metres indoors (Genk 1987).

1993 at age 34, Nordquist competed at the Masters level winning high jump. Nordquist competed at the 1993 Masters National Outdoor Championship, winning the M30 high jump.

== International competitions ==
Year	Competition	Venue	Position	Notes
Representing the United States
1984	Olympic Games	Los Angeles, United States	5th	2.29 m
1986	Goodwill Games	Moscow, Soviet Union	1st	2.34 m
1990	Goodwill Games	Seattle, United States	2nd	2.30 m
