= Athletics at the 1991 Summer Universiade – Men's 10,000 metres =

The men's 10,000 metres event at the 1991 Summer Universiade was held at the Don Valley Stadium in Sheffield on 20 July 1991.

== Results ==
Rank	Athlete	Nationality	Time	Notes
1st place, gold medalist(s)	Stephan Freigang	Germany	28:15.84	UR
2nd place, silver medalist(s)	Ryuki Takei	Japan	28:17.02	
3rd place, bronze medalist(s)	Mogambi Otwori	Kenya	28:18.91	
4	Antonio Rapisarda	France	28:19.13	
5	Tom Ansberry	United States	28:21.60	
6	Salvador Parra	Mexico	28:29.52	
7	John Sherban	Great Britain	28:35.61	PB
8	Noel Berkeley	Ireland	28:41.33	
10	John Scherer	United States	28:59.22	
11	Andrew Lyons	Great Britain	29:04.05	
12	Nihat Yaylalı	Turkey	29:06.74	
13	Antonio Peña	Spain	29:13.22	
14	Bruce Deacon	Canada	29:20.62	
15	Jamie Harrison	Australia	29:29.41	
16	Truls Nygard	Norway	29:44.29	
17	Guo Yijiang	China	29:48.22	
18	Mohamed Arran	Morocco	30:37.74	
19	Kilonzo Mulandi	Kenya	32:39.14	
20	Godfrey Nuwagaba	Uganda	32:42.87	
21	J. M. C. Mugashe	Tanzania	35:29.87	
22	John Votaia	Solomon Islands	35:56.05	
	Paulo Ferreira	Portugal	DNF	
	Lahcen Benyoussef	Morocco	DNF	
