= Athletics at the 1983 Summer Universiade – Women's 4 × 400 metres relay =

The women's 4 × 400 metres relay event at the 1983 Summer Universiade was held at the Commonwealth Stadium in Edmonton on 9 July 1983.

== Results ==
Rank	Nation	Athletes	Time	Notes
1st place, gold medalist(s)	Soviet Union	Larisa Krylova, Lyudmila Borisova, Yelena Didilenko, Mariya Pinigina	3:24.97	UR
2nd place, silver medalist(s)	Canada	Charmaine Crooks, Jillian Richardson, Molly Killingbeck, Marita Payne	3:25.26	
3rd place, bronze medalist(s)	United States	Kelia Bolton, Easter Gabriel, Sharon Dabney, Arlise Emerson	3:34.64	
