= Eloína Echevarría =

Cuban athlete (1961–2025)

Personal information
- Full name: Eloína C. Echevarría
- Born: August 23, 1961
- Died: March 30, 2025 (aged 63)
Medal record
Women's athletics
Representing Cuba
Pan American Games
| Silver medal – second place | 1983 Caracas | Long jump |
| Silver medal – second place | 1991 Havana | Long jump |
| Bronze medal – third place | 1979 San Juan | Long jump |
| Bronze medal – third place | 1987 Indianapolis | Long jump |

Eloína C. Echevarría (August 23, 1961 – March 30, 2025) was a Cuban long and triple jumper.

Her personal best jumps were 6.59 metres in the long jump, achieved in February 1979 in Havana; and 14.34 in the triple jump, achieved in February 1995 in Havana. Echevarría died on March 30, 2025, at the age of 63.

== Achievements ==
| Year | Competition | Venue | Position | Event | Notes |
Representing Cuba
| 1978 | Central American and Caribbean Games | Medellín, Colombia | 3rd | Long jump | 6.12 m |
| 1979 | Pan American Games | San Juan, Puerto Rico | 3rd | Long jump | 6.27 m |
| 1979 | World Cup | Montreal, Canada | 4th | Long jump | 6.25 m^{1} |
| 1981 | Central American and Caribbean Championships | Santo Domingo, Dominican Republic | 2nd | Long jump | 6.29 m |
| 1981 | Universiade | Bucharest, Romania | 4th | Long jump | 6.58 m |
| 1982 | Central American and Caribbean Games | Havana, Cuba | 1st | Long jump | 6.53 m |
| 1983 | Pan American Games | Caracas, Venezuela | 2nd | Long jump | 6.61 m |
| 1983 | Ibero-American Championships | Barcelona, Spain | 1st | Long jump | 6.49 m (+1.9 m/s) |
| 1985 | Central American and Caribbean Championships | Nassau, Bahamas | 2nd | Long jump | 6.41 m w |
| 1985 | Universiade | Kobe, Japan | 4th | Long jump | 6.58 m |
| 1986 | Central American and Caribbean Games | Santiago, Dominican Republic | 1st | Long jump | 6.61 m]] |
| 1986 | Ibero-American Championships | Havana, Cuba | 1st | Long jump | 6.29 m (+1.2 m/s) |
| 1987 | Pan American Games | Indianapolis, United States | 3rd | Long jump | 6.42 m |
| 1989 | Central American and Caribbean Championships | San Juan, Puerto Rico | 1st | Long jump | 6.59 m |
| 1990 | Central American and Caribbean Games | Mexico City, Mexico | 2nd | Long jump | 6.40 m w A |
| 1991 | Pan American Games | Havana, Cuba | 2nd | Long jump | 6.60 m w |
| 1992 | World Cup | Havana, Cuba | 3rd | Triple jump | 13.45 m^{1} |
| 1993 | World Indoor Championships | Toronto, Canada | 8th | Triple jump | 13.77 m |
| 1993 | Central American and Caribbean Championships | Cali, Colombia | 2nd | Long jump | 6.28 m |
| 1993 | Central American and Caribbean Championships | Cali, Colombia | 2nd | Triple jump | 13.63 m |
| 1993 | Central American and Caribbean Games | Ponce, Puerto Rico | 2nd | Long jump | 5.91 m w |
| 1993 | Central American and Caribbean Games | Ponce, Puerto Rico | 2nd | Triple jump | 13.02 m |
| 1995 | Central American and Caribbean Championships | Guatemala City, Guatemala | 2nd | Triple jump | 13.96 m A |

^{1}Representing the Americas
