= List of Summer World University Games records in athletics =

This is the list of Universiade records in athletics.

== Men ==
Event	Record	Name	Date	Games	Place	Ref.
100 m	9.97 (±0.0 m/s)	Akani Simbine (RSA)	9 July 2015	2015 Summer Universiade	Gwangju, South Korea	
200 m	19.72 A (+1.8 m/s)	Pietro Mennea (ITA)	12 September 1979	1979 Summer Universiade	Mexico City, Mexico	
400 m	44.79	João Coelho (POR)	3 August 2023	2021 Summer World University Games	Chengdu, China	
400 m	44.79	Reece Holder (AUS)	3 August 2023	2021 Summer World University Games	Chengdu, China	
800 m	1:43.40	Alberto Juantorena (CUB)	21 August 1977	1977 Summer Universiade	Sofia, Bulgaria	
1500 m	3:38.43	Saïd Aouita (MAR)	22 July 1981	1981 Summer Universiade	Bucharest, Romania	
5000 m	13:35.89	Hayle Ibrahimov (AZE)	12 July 2013	2013 Summer Universiade	Kazan, Russia	
10,000 m	28:15.84	Stephan Freigang (GER)	20 July 1991	1991 Summer Universiade	Sheffield, United Kingdom	
Half marathon	1:02:29	Shinsaku Kudo (JPN)	26 July 2025	2025 Summer World University Games	Bochum, Germany	
110 m hurdles	13.21 (+0.6 m/s)	Alejandro Casañas (CUB)	21 August 1977	1977 Summer Universiade	Sofia, Bulgaria	
400 m hurdles	48.09	Alwyn Myburgh (RSA)	31 August 2001	2001 Summer Universiade	Beijing, China	
3000 m steeplechase	8:18.46	Ruben Querinjean (LUX)	26 July 2025	2025 Summer World University Games	Bochum, Germany	
High jump	2.41 m	Igor Paklin (URS)	4 September 1985	1985 Summer Universiade		
Pole vault	5.80 m	István Bagyula (HUN)	21 July 1991	1991 Summer Universiade	Sheffield, United Kingdom	
Long jump	8.46 m (+1.3 m/s)	Luis Rivera (MEX)	12 July 2013	2013 Summer Universiade	Kazan, Russia	
Triple jump	17.86 m (+1.3 m/s)	Charles Simpkins (USA)	16 July 1985	1985 Summer Universiade		
Shot put	21.54 m	Konrad Bukowiecki (POL)	8 July 2019	2019 Summer Universiade		
Discus throw	69.46 m	Luis Delis (CUB)	8 July 1983	1983 Summer Universiade		
Hammer throw	82.77 m	Ivan Tikhon (BLR)	30 August 2003	2003 Summer Universiade		
Javelin throw	91.36 m	Cheng Chao-tsun (TPE)	26 August 2017	2017 Summer Universiade	Taipei, Taiwan	
Decathlon	8380 pts	Roman Šebrle (CZE)	30 August 1997	1997 Summer Universiade	Catania, Italy	
Decathlon	100m / Long jump / Shot put / High jump / 400m / 110m H / Discus / Pole vault / Javelin / 1500m					
20 km walk (road)	1:19:48	Andrea Cosi (ITA)	27 July 2025	2025 Summer World University Games	Bochum, Germany	
4 × 100 m relay	38.42 A	Italy; Luciano Caravani; Giovanni Grazioli; Gianfranco Lazzer; Pietro Mennea	13 September 1979	1979 Summer Universiade	Mexico City, Mexico	
4 × 400 m relay	3:00.40	United States; Ryan Hayden; Leonard Byrd; Andre Morris; Anthuan Maybank	3 September 1995	1995 Summer Universiade	Fukuoka, Japan	

== Women ==
Event	Record	Name	Date	Games	Place	Ref.
100 m	11.00 A	Marlies Göhr (GDR)	8 September 1979	1979 Universiade	Mexico City, Mexico	
200 m	21.91 A	Marita Koch (GDR)	12 September 1979	1979 Universiade	Mexico City, Mexico	
400 m	49.88	Ionela Târlea (ROU)	12 July 1999	Palma de Mallorca 1999		
800 m	1:56.88	Slobodanka Čolović (YUG)	19 July 1987	Zagreb 1987		
1500 m	4:01.32	Paula Ivan (ROU)	16 July 1987	Zagreb 1987		
5000 m	15:28.78	Jessica Augusto (POR)	13 August 2007	2007 Summer Universiade	Bangkok, Thailand	
10,000 m	31:25.84	Klara Lukan (SLO)	21 July 2025	2025 Summer World University Games	Bochum, Germany	
Half marathon	1:11:49	Mari Sotani (JPN)	31 August 1997	1997 Summer Universiade	Catania, Italy	
100 m hurdles	12.61 (+1.8 m/s)	Vashti Thomas (USA)	11 July 2013	Kazan 2013		
400 m hurdles	53.95	Daimí Pernía (CUB)	10 July 1999	Palma de Mallorca 1999		
3000 m steeplechase	9:25.77	Ekaterina Sokolenko (RUS)	10 July 2015	Gwangju 2015		
High jump	2.01 m	Silvia Costa (CUB)	3 September 1985	Kobe 1985		
Pole vault	4.70 m	Tatyana Polnova (RUS)	27 August 2003	Daegu 2003		
Long jump	7.04 m	Irina Valyukevich (URS)	4 September 1985	Kobe 1985		
Triple jump	14.82 m (−0.2 m/s)	Ekaterina Koneva (RUS)	11 July 2013	Kazan 2013		
Shot put	20.82 m	Nadezhda Chizhova (URS)	20 August 1973	Moscow 1973		
Discus throw	67.96 m	Tsvetanka Khristova (BUL)	13 August 1987	Zagreb 1987		
Hammer throw	76.85 m	Malwina Kopron (POL)	26 August 2017	2017 Summer Universiade	Taipei, Taiwan	
Javelin throw	69.82 m	Osleidys Menéndez (CUB)	29 August 2001	2001 Summer Universiade	Beijing, China	
Heptathlon	6847 pts	Larisa Nikitina (URS)	29 August 1989	Duisburg 1989		
Heptathlon	100m H / High jump / Shot put / 200m / Long jump / Javelin / 800m					
20 km walk (road)	1:28:18	Anisya Kirdyapkina (RUS)	10 July 2015	2015 Summer Universiade	Gwangju, South Korea	
20 km walk (road)	1:28:18	Elizabeth McMillen (AUS)	27 July 2025	2025 Summer World University Games	Bochum, Germany	
4 × 100 m relay	42.40	United States; Michelle Burrell; Anita Howard; LaMonda Miller; Esther Jones	30 August 1989	Duisburg 1989		
4 × 400 m relay	3:24.97	Soviet Union; Larisa Krylova; Lyudmila Borisova; Yelena Didilenko; Mariya Pinigina	9 July 1983	Edmonton 1983		

== Mixed ==
Event	Record	Name	Date	Games	Place	Ref.
4 × 400 m relay	3:15.58	Poland; Daniel Sołtysiak; Weronika Bartnowska; Marcin Karolewski; Aleksandra Formella	24 July 2025	2025 Summer World University Games	Bochum, Germany	

== Records in defunct events ==
=== Men's events ===
Event	Record	Name	Date	Universiade	Place	Ref.
Marathon	2:12:19	Kennedy Manyisa (KEN)	18 July 1993	1993 Summer Universiade	Buffalo, United States	
Javelin throw (old design)	89.52	Dainis Kūla (URS)	26 July 1981	1981 Summer Universiade	Bucharest, Romania	

=== Women's events ===
Event	Record	Name	Date	Universiade	Ref.
3000 m	8:44.09	Paula Ivan (ROM)	27 August 1989	Duisburg 1989	
Marathon	2:35:09	Irina Bogacheva (URS)	26 August 1989	Duisburg 1989	
80 m hurdles	10.6 h	Danuta Straszyńska (POL)	1965	Budapest 1965	
5 km walk	20:44	Ileana Salvador (ITA)	29 August 1989	Duisburg 1989	
10 km walk	43:20	Gao Hongmiao (CHN)	29 August 2001	Beijing 2001	
Javelin throw (old design)	71.82	Ivonne Leal (CUB)	30 August 1985	Kobe 1985	
Pentathlon	4884 pts	Tatyana Kondrashova (URS)	September 1970	Turin 1970	

== See also ==
- List of Universiade records in swimming
