= Athletics at the 1989 Summer Universiade – Women's heptathlon =

The women's heptathlon event at the 1989 Summer Universiade was held at the Wedaustadion in Duisburg on 28 and 29 August 1989.

== Results ==
| Rank | Athlete | Nationality | 100m H | HJ | SP | 200m | LJ | JT | 800m | Points | Notes |
|---|---|---|---|---|---|---|---|---|---|---|---|
| 1st place, gold medalist(s) | Larisa Nikitina | Soviet Union | 13.47 | 1.81 | 16.12 | 24.12 | 6.66 | 59.28 | 2:22.07 | 6847 | GR |
| 2nd place, silver medalist(s) | Sabine Braun | West Germany | 13.25 | 1.87 | 13.60 | 24.52 | 6.39 | 50.40 | 2:18.00 | 6575 | |
| 3rd place, bronze medalist(s) | Jane Flemming | Australia | 13.66 | 1.84 | 13.73 | 24.34 | 6.33 | 42.62 | 2:19.16 | 6286 | |
| 4 | Birgit Clarius | West Germany | 13.89 | 1.81 | 14.09 | 25.60 | 6.00 | 47.42 | 2:14.82 | 6173 | |
| 5 | Liliana Năstase | Romania | 13.89 | 1.63 | 12.62 | 24.26 | 6.34 | 45.30 | 2:14.57 | 6170 | |
| 6 | Corinne Schneider | Italy | 14.11 | 1.78 | 12.52 | 25.39 | 6.09 | 45.80 | 2:18.96 | 5957 | |
| 7 | Gea Johnson | United States | 13.95 | 1.75 | 13.24 | 25.33 | 6.02 | 43.68 | 2:19.00 | 5932 | |
| 8 | Urszula Włodarczyk | Poland | 13.72 | 1.75 | 12.97 | 24.98 | 5.92 | 40.78 | 2:18.58 | 5898 | |
| 9 | Anne Brit Skjæveland | Norway | 13.62 | 1.81 | 10.96 | 25.16 | 5.82 | 34.72 | 2:16.40 | 5722 | |
| 10 | Tina Rättyä | Finland | 13.84 | 1.69 | 11.98 | 25.57 | 5.88 | 43.48 | 2:19.03 | 5722 | |
| 11 | Ingrid Didden | Belgium | 13.85 | 1.66 | 11.29 | 26.55 | 5.88 | 47.60 | 2:23.20 | 5578 | |
| 12 | Wu Pin | China | 14.36 | 1.63 | 11.61 | 24.90 | 6.09 | 36.36 | 2:19.27 | 5538 | |
| 13 | Doris Stelzmüller | Switzerland | 13.89 | 1.60 | 11.29 | 25.33 | 5.69 | 37.84 | 2:18.07 | 5433 | |
| 14 | Susana Cruz | Spain | | | | | | | | 5278 | |
| 15 | Larissa Soto | Guatemala | | | | | | | | 4292 | |
| | Jolanda Jones | United States | | | | | | | | DNF | |
| | Ruth Mayr | Italy | | | | | | | | DNF | |
| | Esther Suter | Switzerland | | | | | | | | DNF | |
