= Benjaminas Viluckis =

Lithuanian hammer thrower (1961–2017)

Benjaminas Viluckis (20 March 1961 – 19 September 2017) was a male hammer thrower from Lithuania, who competed for his native country at the 1992 Summer Olympics in Barcelona, Spain. He set his personal best (82.24 metres) on 21 August 1986 at a meet in Klaipėda. That mark is still the national record.

== Achievements ==
Year	Competition	Venue	Position	Notes
Representing the Soviet Union
1986	Goodwill Games	Moscow, Soviet Union	3rd	80.04 m
Representing Lithuania
1992	Olympic Games	Barcelona, Spain	20th (q)	70.54 m
