= Athletics at the 1987 Pan American Games – Women's long jump =

Women's long jump at the Pan American Games

The women's long jump event at the 1987 Pan American Games was held in Indianapolis, United States on 13 August.

== Results ==
Rank	Name	Nationality	#1	#2	#3	#4	#5	#6	Result	Notes
1st place, gold medalist(s)	Jackie Joyner	United States	7.13	x	7.25	7.21	7.15	7.45	7.45	=WR
2nd place, silver medalist(s)	Jennifer Innis	United States	6.81	6.70	6.80	6.70	6.85	6.78	6.85	
3rd place, bronze medalist(s)	Eloína Echevarría	Cuba	x	6.12	6.32	6.42	6.42	6.34	6.42	
4	Cynthia Henry	Jamaica	6.10	x	x	6.30	6.19	6.38	6.38	
5	Madeline de Jesús	Puerto Rico	5.81	6.12	6.28	6.17	6.21	6.29	6.28	
6	Glen Marie David	Antigua and Barbuda	4.94	5.29	x	5.39	5.60	x	5.60	
	Orlane dos Santos	Brazil							DNS	
