= Athletics at the 1973 Summer Universiade – Women's shot put =

The women's shot put event at the 1973 Summer Universiade was held at the Central Lenin Stadium in Moscow on 20 August.

== Results ==
Rank	Athlete	Nationality	Result	Notes
1st place, gold medalist(s)	Nadezhda Chizhova	Soviet Union	20.82	UR
2nd place, silver medalist(s)	Elena Stoyanova	Bulgaria	18.64	
3rd place, bronze medalist(s)	Faina Melnik	Soviet Union	18.31	
4	Gabriele Greiner	East Germany	17.36	
5	Christine Barck	Finland	15.66	
6	Maren Seidler	United States	15.23	
7	Krystyna Nadolna	Poland	14.92	
8	Diane Jones	Canada	14.64	
9	Carol Martin	Canada	13.73	
10	Meg Ritchie	Great Britain	11.86	
11	María Elena Rojas	Chile	11.07	
