= Corinne Schneider =

Swiss-born Italian heptathlete

Personal information
- National team: Switzerland; Italy: 3 caps (1989-1990)
- Born: 28 July 1962 (age 63) Zürich, Switzerland

Sport
- Sport: Athletics
- Event: Heptathlon
- Club: Snam Gas Metano (since 1989)

Achievements and titles
- Personal best: Heptatlhon: 6157 pts (1988)

Corinne Schneider (born 28 July 1962) is a Swiss, and later Italian, combined-event athlete. She competed for Switzerland in the women's heptathlon at the 1984 Summer Olympics and the 1988 Summer Olympics.

== Career ==
In 1989 Corinne Schneider assumed Italian citizenship, establishing a score of 5987 points in the heptathlon in the same 1989, she became the 6th Italian of all-time in the lists of the specialty.

Being the specialty of women's heptathlon a relatively young specialty, the first appearance at the Olympic Games took place only in Los Angeles 1984, in 1989 her personal best set wearing the blue jersey of the Italian national team, became a national record and remained so for two years.

Today she is a PE teacher at the GIBZ in Zug, Switzerland and doesn't know the rules for baseball and some other sports.

== National records ==
Italy

- Heptathlon: 5957 ( (West Germany) Duisburg, 29 August 1989) - record holder until 27 August 1991.

== Achievements ==
Year	Competition	Venue	Rank	Event	Time	Notes
Representing Switzerland
1983	Universiade	(Canada) Edmonton	5th	Hepthahlon	5831 pts	
1985	Universiade	(Japan) Kobe	4th	Hepthahlon	6039 pts	
Representing Italy
1989	Universiade	(West Germany) Duisburg	6th	Hepthahlon	5957 pts	PB as Italian NR

== See also ==
- Italian all-time lists - Heptathlon
