= Athletics at the 1987 Summer Universiade – Women's discus throw =

The women's discus throw event at the 1987 Summer Universiade was held at the Stadion Maksimir in Zagreb on 13 July 1987.

== Results ==
Rank	Athlete	Nationality	Result	Notes
1st place, gold medalist(s)	Tsvetanka Khristova	Bulgaria	67.96	UR
2nd place, silver medalist(s)	Gabriele Reinsch	East Germany	64.12	
3rd place, bronze medalist(s)	Hou Xuemei	China	64.04	
4	Irina Meszynski	East Germany	63.30	
5	Connie Price	United States	61.66	
6	Kelly Landry	United States	58.28	
7	Elisabeta Neamțu	Romania	56.84	
8	Snežana Golubić	Yugoslavia	55.34	
9	Maria Marello	Italy	54.60	
10	Rozalija Nađ	Yugoslavia	53.46	
11	Valentina Fedyushina	Soviet Union	44.76	
12	Elvira Yufra	Peru	41.12	
13	Helen Weidum	Suriname	36.52	
14	Deepika Rodrigo	Sri Lanka	35.76	
	Barbara Beuge	West Germany	DNS	
