= Grigoriy Degtyaryov =

Personal information
- Born: 16 August 1958 Vorkuta, Russian SFSR, Soviet Union
- Died: 7 March 2011

Sport
- Sport: Athletics
- Event: Decathlon

Achievements and titles
- Personal best: 8698 pts (1984)
Medal record
Representing the Soviet Union
Friendship Games
Gold medal – first place	1984 Moscow	Decathlon
Goodwill Games
Gold medal – first place	1986 Moscow	Decathlon

Grigoriy Grigoryevich Degtyaryov (Russian: Григорий Григорьевич Дегтярёв; 16 August 1958 – 7 March 2011) was a Soviet Russian decathlete. Degtyaryov won gold medals at the 1984 Friendship Games and the 1986 Goodwill Games and was ranked in the world's top 10 in every year from 1982 to 1986. As of 2015, his personal best of 8698 points remains the Russian national record.

== Biography ==
Degtyaryov was born in Vorkuta, Komi ASSR on 16 August 1958. He first represented the Soviet Union in a major international meet at the 1982 European Championships in Athens, where he placed sixth; Track & Field News ranked him fifth in the world that year. In 1983 Degtyaryov won first at the Hypo-Meeting in Götzis, and then at the Soviet Spartakiad; his Spartakiad score of 8538 points (on the 1962 scoring tables) was a new Soviet record. He entered the 1983 World Championships in Helsinki ranked third on season bests (behind Jürgen Hingsen and Siegfried Wentz, and ahead of eventual winner Daley Thompson), but dropped out of contention after four events; after an average start, he no-heighted in the high jump, missing three times at his opening height of 1.91 m. As in 1982, he placed fifth in the world in Track & Field News's year-end rankings.

In 1984 Degtyaryov repeated as both Götzis champion and Soviet champion and also won at the Friendship Games in Moscow. At the Soviet Championships he scored his personal best and another Soviet record, 8652 points; after new scoring tables were introduced, this became 8698 points, which as of 2015 remains the Russian national record and ranks 18th on the world all-time list. Degtyaryov missed the 1984 Summer Olympics in Los Angeles due to the Soviet boycott, but was still ranked a career-best third in the world.

Degtyaryov remained in good shape for two more years, ranking in the world's top 10 in both 1985 and 1986 and winning gold at the 1986 Goodwill Games, ahead of Soviet record holder Aleksandr Apaychev. (Note: Apaychev's Soviet record of 8709 points dated back to 1984 and had actually been set three weeks before Degtyaryov scored 8698 at the 1984 Soviet Championships; but on the old scoring tables Apaychev's score had been 8642, lower than Degtyaryov's. As Apaychev was Ukrainian, Degtyaryov retained the Russian record despite the scoring table update.) He retired as an athlete in 1987, but remained active in the sport as a coach.
