= Wang Zhihui =

Chinese long jumper

Personal information
- Born: 1 May 1965 (age 61)

Sport
- Sport: Track and field
Medal record
Representing China
Asian Championships
Gold medal – first place	1987 Singapore	Long jump

Wang Zhihui (born 1 May 1965) is a retired Chinese long jumper.

She won the 1987 Asian Championships in a new championship record of 6.70 metres. This was also her career best jump.

She also competed at the 1987 World Championships without reaching the final round.
