= Gerard Donakowski =

American long-distance runner

Personal information
- Nationality: American
- Born: February 20, 1960 (age 66) Rochester, Michigan

Sport
- Sport: Track, long-distance running
- Event(s): Mile, 3000 meters, 5000 meters, 10,000 meters
- College team: Michigan

Achievements and titles
- Personal best(s): Mile: 3:59.10; 3000m: 7:52.79; 5000m: 13:25.75; 10,000m: 27:58.41
Medal record
Men's athletics
Representing the United States
Goodwill Games
Silver medal – second place	1986 Moscow	Men's 10,000m

Gerard Donakowski (born February 20, 1960) is a retired distance runner. He was especially successful in the 10,000 meter event, finishing as the men's runner-up in the 10,000 meters at the 1986 Goodwill Games. He was the men's winner of the 1987 Charlotte Observer Marathon. He is a brother of Bill Donakowski.

== Running career ==
=== Collegiate ===
At the University of Michigan as a cross country runner he was an All-American in 1983. He was also an All-American in both indoor and outdoor track and field along with being a 3-time Big Ten Conference champion.

=== Post-collegiate ===
Donakowski was the runner-up in the men's 10,000 meters at the 1986 Goodwill Games.

On January 3, 1987, Donakowski won the Charlotte Observer Marathon in 2:20:17 in a close finish over Budd Coates. He got $2,000 in prize money for the win that day. Later that year, he won the men's 10,000 meter winner at the USATF Championships. This entitled him to compete in the 1987 World Championships in Athletics in the 10,000 meters. Although he was listed as a competitor, he was a no-show for the competition.

On July 15, 1988, Donakowski finished in fifth place of the first heat in the men's 10,000 meters at the USATF Olympic Trials, advancing to the finals. The conditions during the first heat race were hot enough that six of 17 runners in the race dropped out, among them being Nike Coast runner Jay Marden who was carried off the track in a stretcher. On July 18, 1988, Donakowski finished in 8th in the men's 10,000 meter final in a time of 29:46.04.

On May 20, 1990, after leading for the first two miles, he finished in third place at the Trib 10K in 28:28. He got $1,000 in prize money for the performance. The course was downhill and was not eligible for records or rankings.
