= Sean Egan =

American free software programmer

- Born: April 5, 1982 (age 44); Long Island, New York, U.S.
- Education: Chaminade High School, Binghamton University

Sean Egan is a software engineer at Google, where he worked on Google Talk and is currently working on Google Maps. He is the former project leader of Pidgin, a popular instant messaging client. He is also the author of the book Open Source Messaging Application Development: Building and Extending Gaim.

== Biography ==
Born on April 5, 1982, in Long Island, New York, Sean Egan graduated from Chaminade High School in Mineola, New York and earned his Bachelor of Science degree at Binghamton University with a major in computer science.

Egan became a major contributor to the field of open-source real-time communication software since 2000, when he started working on Gaim, an open-source, multi-protocol, cross-platform instant messaging application. He became an official part of the Gaim team in January 2001 and was maintainer of the project — renamed Pidgin in April 2007 — from early 2002 until April 2008 when he announced his retirement.

Egan was hired by Google, Inc. in September 2005 as a software engineer on the Google Talk team. As a leader of the libjingle project, he focused his efforts on ensuring interoperability in the voice features of XMPP-based instant messaging clients.

== Published works ==
- Egan, Sean M. Open Source Messaging Application Development: Building and Extending Gaim, Berkeley, CA: Apress, 2005. ISBN 1-59059-467-3.

== See also ==
- Pidgin
- Google Talk
