= Djétenan Kouadio =

Ivorian sprinter

Personal information
- Nationality: Ivorian
- Born: 5 August 1960 (age 65)

Sport
- Sport: Sprinting
- Event: 4 × 400 metres relay

Djétenan Kouadio (born 5 August 1960) is an Ivorian sprinter. He competed in the men's 4 × 400 metres relay at the 1988 Summer Olympics.
