= Birgit Dressel =

German heptathlete

Personal information
- Born: May 4, 1960 Bremen, West Germany
- Died: April 10, 1987 (aged 26) Mainz, West Germany

Sport
- Sport: Heptathlon

Birgit Dressel (May 4, 1960 – April 10, 1987) was a West German heptathlete. Dressel participated in the 1984 Olympic heptathlon, where she ended ninth, and was fourth in the 1986 European Championships. She died at age 26 due to sudden multiple organ failure, which was at least partly triggered by long-term steroid abuse.

== Death ==
According to Time magazine, Dressel had a very laissez-faire attitude about medication: she stocked large amounts of medicines, and when her mother asked her about it, she said: "These are all harmless drugs. All athletes take them. It's really nothing special." In April 1987, Dressel's condition rapidly declined. She had taken over 100 medications in the last few months, among them steroids. After taking additional medication to relieve back pain, her body went into allergic-toxic shock on April 8, causing rapid multiple organ failure. Due to consistent overmedication, her nerves were so damaged that painkillers were useless. After three days of agony, Dressel died on April 10. An autopsy revealed traces of 101 different medications in her body.

=== Aftermath ===
According to the German Olympic Sports Association (DOSB), doping was common in the West German athletes of the 1980s. After her death, a 120-page report was filed where Dressel's death has been officially deemed "due to unknown reasons", but German doping analyst Werner Franke said:

The fatal incident that killed Birgit Dressel was undoubtedly triggered by anabolic doping.

— Werner Franke

According to the German Olympic Sports Association (DOSB), many West German athletes "in fear flushed their medications down the toilet", but soon many reverted to the old ways of doping. "Helpful" was also the general laissez-faire attitude in West German sports with doping, as the DOSB remarked that neither in sports nor in the legal branch there was any drive to further investigate this death; doping was even called "therapeutic" by some.
