= Akissi Kpidi =

Ivorian sprinter

Personal information
- Nationality: Ivorian
- Born: 3 March 1964 (age 62)

Sport
- Sport: Sprinting
- Event: 4 × 400 metres relay

Akissi Kpidi (born 3 March 1964) is an Ivorian sprinter. He competed in the men's 4 × 400 metres relay at the 1988 Summer Olympics.
