= Sammy Tirop =

Kenyan middle-distance runner

Medal record

Men's athletics

Representing Kenya

Commonwealth Games
Gold medal – first place	1990 Auckland	800 m

Goodwill Games
Bronze medal – third place	1986 Moscow	800 m

Samuel Tirop (born 13 January 1959 in Nandi District) is a former Kenyan middle-distance runner who ran in the 800 metres.

Tirop's first major medal came at the 1986 Goodwill Games, where he was his country's sole medallist with his bronze in the 800 m. His career coincided with a period of Kenyan dominance in men's middle-distance running: Kenyans won all the major titles from 1987 to 1992 through runners such as Billy Konchellah and Paul Ereng. As a result, he frequently missed out on major competitions due to the high calibre of opposition at the national level.

He won at the East and Central African Championships in 1989 and in December he managed second at the 1989 Kenyan Trials for the Commonwealth Games, running a personal best of 1:44.3 minutes which ranked him eleventh in the world that year. Largely unknown outside of his home nation, he went on to upset both Nixon Kiprotich and Sebastian Coe to win the 800 m at the 1990 Commonwealth Games in Auckland. When asked how he had achieved such a feat at the age of 31 with little international experience, he responded that he was typically fourth or fifth at the Kenyan Championships behind World and Olympic champions for opposition.

When the trials for the 1992 Barcelona Olympics came, Tirop again missed out on selection. Renowned Kenyan running coach Brother Colm O'Connell remarked: "You had the Olympic champion, Ereng; the world champion, Konchellah, and the Commonwealth champion, Sammy Tirop, and none of them made the team. That's what running in Kenya is like."
