= Oleksandr Apaychev =

Soviet Ukrainian decathlete

Medal record

Men's athletics

Representing Soviet Union

Goodwill Games
Silver medal – second place	1986 Moscow	Decathlon

Oleksandr Valentynovych Apaychev (Russian: Александр Валентинович Апайчев; Ukrainian: Олександр Валентинович Апайчев; born 6 May 1961) is a former Soviet Ukrainian decathlete. His personal best score of 8709 points is the current Ukrainian record and ranks 16th on the world all-time list. He placed second at the 1986 Goodwill Games and competed in the 1988 Summer Olympics, but failed to finish due to a leg infection. In 2009 he was named as head coach of Ukraine's national athletics team.

== Career ==
Apaychev scored his personal best, 8709 points, at the 1984 Soviet Union-East Germany dual meet in Neubrandenburg. At the time, it was a Soviet record; as of 2014, it remains the Ukrainian national record and places him 16th on the world all-time list. Apaychev couldn't compete at the 1984 Summer Olympics in Los Angeles due to the Soviet-led boycott; instead, he took part in the Friendship Games in Moscow. At the Friendship Games he was on good pace after the first day, but a poor showing in the seventh event, discus throw, killed his chances for a good result, and he eventually fell out of the medals. Track & Field News ranked him fourth in the world that year, behind Olympic top two Daley Thompson and Jürgen Hingsen and Friendship Games gold medallist Grigoriy Degtyaryev.

Apaychev's Achilles tendon was operated at the end of 1984 and he took some time to regain top shape. In 1986 he placed fifth at the European Championships in Stuttgart and won silver at the Goodwill Games in Moscow. He was in good shape in 1988 and was one of the favorites for the Summer Olympics in Seoul, but a leg infection spoiled his chances and he gave up without finishing even the first event, 100 metres. The infection effectively ended his career, as he took more than a year to recover; he attempted a comeback in 1990, but injured himself and retired from competition.

Apaychev has remained active in the sport as a coach. Between 2001 and 2005 he served as a coach in Qatar, coaching among others Qatari decathlon record holder Ahmad Hassan Moussa. In 2009 he was named as head coach of Ukraine's national team.

== Personal life ==
Apaychev is married to former athlete Tetyana Khamitova.
