= Marco Bucci (athlete) =

Italian discus thrower (1960-2013)

Personal information
- Nationality: Italian
- Born: 29 November 1960 Ferrara, Italy
- Died: 6 August 2013 (aged 52) Velletri, Italy
- Height: 1.90 m (6 ft 3 in)
- Weight: 108 kg (238 lb)

Sport
- Country: Italy
- Sport: Athletics
- Event: Discus throw
- Club: Pro Patria Milano

Achievements and titles
- Personal best: Discus throw: 66.96 m (1984)
Medal record
Summer Universiade
Bronze medal – third place	1983 Edmonton	Discus thrower

Marco Bucci (29 November 1960 – 6 August 2013) was an Italian discus thrower. He won one medal, at senior level, at the 1983 Summer Universiade.

== Biography ==
Bucci was born in Ferrara. He won the national championships three times. In 1980s, he had a rivalry with Marco Martino. In 1984, he was forced to forfeit prior to the qualification of the discus throw at the 1984 Summer Olympics because of a stretched pectoralis muscle strain.

== National records ==
- Discus throw: 66.96 m ( (Italy) Formia, 30 June 1984) - holder to 28 May 1989

== Achievements ==
Year	Competition	Venue	Position	Event	Performance	Notes
1983	Summer Universiade	(Canada) Edmonton	3rd	Discus throw	60.62 m	
1984	Summer Olympics	(United States) Los Angeles	NQ	Discus throw	NM	

== Nationaltitles ==
- 2 wins in discus throw at the Italian Athletics Championships (1982, 1984)
- 1 win in discus throw at the Italian Winter Throwing Championships (1984)

== See also ==
- Italian all-time top lists - Discus throw
