= Aleksey Pershin =

Soviet racewalker

Personal information
- Nationality: Soviet
- Born: 20 February 1962 (age 64) Kyzylorda, Kazakhstan
- Height: 1.73 m (5 ft 8 in)
- Weight: 67 kg (148 lb)

Sport
- Sport: Athletics
- Event: Racewalking

Aleksey Pershin (born 20 February 1962) is a Soviet racewalker. He competed in the men's 20 kilometres walk at the 1988 Summer Olympics.
