= Pavel Yakovlev (athlete) =

Soviet Olympic middle-distance runner

Personal information
- Nationality: Soviet
- Born: 16 January 1958 (age 68) Ulan-Ude, Buryat ASSR, Russian SFSR, Soviet Union
- Height: 183 cm (6 ft 0 in)
- Weight: 76 kg (168 lb)

Sport
- Country: Soviet Union
- Sport: Middle-distance running

Pavel Kuzmich Yakovlev (Russian: Павел Кузьмич Яковлев) was a Soviet Olympic middle-distance runner. He represented his country in the men's 1500 meters at the 1980 Summer Olympics. His time was a 3:44.19 in the first heat.
