= Elvira Barbashina =

Uzbekistani runner (born 1963)

Elvira Barbashina (born February 25, 1963) is a retired Uzbekistani runner who specialized in the 100 and 200 metres. During her active years she represented the Soviet Union. She holds the current Uzbekistani record in 200 meters.

== Personal bests ==
- 100 metres - 11.12 s (July 1986)
- 200 metres - 22.27 s (July 1986)
