= Irina Valyukevich =

Belarusian long jumper (born 1959)

Personal information
- Born: 19 November 1959 (age 66)

Sport
- Sport: Track and field
Medal record
Representing Soviet Union
Summer Universiade
| Gold medal – first place | 1985 Kobe | Long jump |

Irina Valyukevich (Belarusian: Ірына Валюкевіч; born 19 November 1959) is a retired long jumper who represented USSR and later Belarus. Her personal best jump was 7.17 metres, achieved in July 1987 in Bryansk.

== Achievements ==
| Year | Tournament | Venue | Result | Extra |
|---|---|---|---|---|
| 1985 | Summer Universiade | Kobe, Japan | 1st | |
| 1986 | Goodwill Games | Moscow, Soviet Union | 3rd | |
| 1987 | World Championships | Rome, Italy | 6th | |
