= Athletics at the 1976 Summer Olympics – Men's 1500 metres =

Men's 1500 metres at the Games of the XXI Olympiad
- Olympic Athletics
- Venue: Olympic Stadium
- Dates: 29–31 July 1976
- Competitors: 42 from 28 nations
- Winning time: 3:39.1

Medalists
1st place, gold medalist(s)		John Walker; New Zealand
2nd place, silver medalist(s)		Ivo Van Damme; Belgium
3rd place, bronze medalist(s)		Paul-Heinz Wellmann; West Germany

The men's 1,500m metres was an event at the 1976 Summer Olympics in Montreal, Quebec, Canada. The final was held on Saturday 31 July 1976 and was contested by 9 athletes. The semifinals were held on 30 July 1976 and were contested by 18 athletes. The heats were held on 29 July 1976 and 45 athletes entered; 42 athletes from 28 nations competed. The maximum number of athletes per nation had been set at 3 since the 1930 Olympic Congress. The event was won by John Walker of New Zealand, the nation's first 1500 metres title since 1964 and third overall. Ivo Van Damme's silver was Belgium's first medal in the event.

As of 2023, the winning margin of 0.10 seconds remains the narrowest winning margin in the men's 1500 metres at the Olympics since the introduction of fully automatic timing.

== Summary ==
With the absence of notable front runner, world record holder Filbert Bayi, who was part of the 1976 Summer Olympics boycott, the race devolved into a slow, tactical battle. After a slow 62 second first lap, notable kicker Eamonn Coghlan rushed from the back of the field to the front, followed by mile world record holder, John Walker, but their action in the front only seemed to keep the pace slow. For another lap and a half, the field jockeyed for position for the inevitable final kick. Between 500 meters out and the bell the field bunched so it was almost four abreast across the line behind Walker and Coghlan. The bunch followed around the turn to the start line, then Walker decided to make the break, gaining a step on Coghlan with 800 meter medalists Rick Wohlhuter and Ivo Van Damme the next in line. Walker never relinquished his lead, slowly building on the gap. Behind him van Damme with Wohlhuter as his shadow, edged up on Coghlan. First Wohlhuter fell back, then Coghlan. As van Damme continued to chase Walker, Paul-Heinz Wellmann ran past the faltering athletes along the rail. A defeated Coghlan tried not to give up, dipping for the finish line in vain almost 10 meters too early. All that succeeded in doing was making him lose his balance, clearly falling to fourth place.

Five months after this race, van Damme was killed in an automobile accident. Three other competitors from this race had notable extended careers; Walker set the record for running 100 sub-4 minute miles in his career in 1985. He competed in the Athletics at the 1990 Commonwealth Games on home soil at age 38. David Moorcroft set the 5,000 metres world record and later the masters M40 world record in the mile. Coghlan held the title of "Chairman of the boards" as a spectacular indoor mile runner. He took Moorcroft's masters record on an indoor track, becoming the first masters runner to break the 4 minute mile.

== Background ==
This was the 18th appearance of the event, which is one of 12 athletics events to have been held at every Summer Olympics. There were two 1972 finalists returning, sixth-place finisher Herman Mignon of Belgium and seventh-place finisher Paul-Heinz Wellmann of West Germany. The highly anticipated matchup was between Filbert Bayi of Tanzania and John Walker of New Zealand; at the 1974 Commonwealth Games, the two had both beaten the world record with Bayi taking top honors by 0.36 seconds. But New Zealand's rugby tour of South Africa meant that the rematch would not occur: Tanzania was among the nations that would boycott the Games if New Zealand were not banned; thus, either Walker or Bayi would be unable to compete. When the IOC did not ban New Zealand, Tanzania followed through on the boycott, keeping Bayi out of the Games. Neither man was in perfect health in any case, with Walker battling chronic compartment syndrome and Bayi fighting malaria.

Cuba, Haiti, and Nicaragua each made their first appearance in the event. The United States made its 18th appearance, the only nation to have competed in the men's 1500 metres at each Games to that point.

== Competition format ==
The competition was again three rounds (used previously in 1952 and since 1964). The "fastest loser" system introduced in 1964 was used for both the first round and semifinals. For the third straight Games, the size of the final changed: 1968 had upped the final from 9 to 12 runners, 1972 had reduced it to 10, and now the final was back to 9 men.

There were five heats in the first round, each with 9 runners (before withdrawals). The top three runners in each heat, along with the next three fastest overall, advanced to the semifinals. The 18 semifinalists were divided into two semifinals, each with 9 runners. The top four men in each semifinal, plus the fastest fifth-placer, advanced to the 9-man final.

== Records ==
These were the standing world and Olympic records prior to the 1976 Summer Olympics.

World record	Filbert Bayi (TAN)	3:32.16	Christchurch, New Zealand	2 February 1974
Olympic record	Kip Keino (KEN)	3:34.9	Mexico City, Mexico	20 October 1968

No new world or Olympic records were set during the competition.

== Schedule ==
All times are Eastern Daylight Time (UTC-4)

Date	Time	Round
Thursday, 29 July 1976	16:40	Round 1
Friday, 30 July 1976	16:20	Semifinals
Saturday, 31 July 1976	18:00	Final

== Results ==
=== Round 1 ===
==== Heat 1 ====
Rank	Athlete	Nation	Time	Notes
1	Marc Nevens	Belgium	3:44.18	Q
2	Helder Baiona De Jesus	Portugal	3:44.20	Q
3	János Zemen	Hungary	3:44.27	Q
4	Åke Svenson	Sweden	3:44.42	
5	Evert Hoving	Netherlands	3:45.00	
6	Matt Centrowitz	United States	3:45.02	
7	Antti Loikkanen	Finland	3:45.32	
8	Ruben Sørensen	Denmark	3:45.39	
—	Mhamed Amakdouf	Morocco	DNS	

==== Heat 2 ====
Rank	Athlete	Nation	Time	Notes
1	Steve Ovett	Great Britain	3:37.89	Q
2	Thomas Wessinghage	West Germany	3:37.93	Q
3	Fernando Pacheco Mamede	Portugal	3:37.98	Q
4	Herman Mignon	Belgium	3:38.32	q
5	Mike Durkin	United States	3:38.89	
6	Gheorghe Ghipu	Romania	3:39.20	
7	Günther Hasler	Liechtenstein	3:39.34	
8	Markku Laine	Finland	3:45.32	
9	Francisco Menocal	Nicaragua	4:12.47	

==== Heat 3 ====
Rank	Athlete	Nation	Time	Notes
1	John Walker	New Zealand	3:36.87	Q
2	Frank Clement	Great Britain	3:37.53	Q
3	Graham Crouch	Australia	3:37.97	Q
4	Paul Craig	Canada	3:38.00	q
5	Francis Gonzalez	France	3:38.59	q
6	Bronisław Malinowski	Poland	3:41.67	
7	Ágúst Ásgeirsson	Iceland	3:45.47	
8	Sheikr Al-Shabani	Saudi Arabia	4:08.70	
—	Anders Gärderud	Sweden	DNS	

==== Heat 4 ====
Rank	Athlete	Nation	Time	Notes
1	Paul-Heinz Wellmann	West Germany	3:39.86	Q
2	Ivo Van Damme	Belgium	3:39.93	Q
3	Rick Wohlhuter	United States	3:39.94	Q
4	Niall O'Shaughnessy	Ireland	3:40.12	
5	Anthony Colón	Puerto Rico	3:43.51	
6	Ulf Hogberg	Sweden	3:47.96	
7	Peter Spir	Canada	3:59.60	
8	Emmanuel Saint-Hilaire	Haiti	4:23.41	
—	Carlo Grippo	Italy	DNS	

==== Heat 5 ====
Rank	Athlete	Nation	Time	Notes
1	Eamonn Coghlan	Ireland	3:39.87	Q
2	Dave Moorcroft	Great Britain	3:40.69	Q
3	Dave Hill	Canada	3:41.24	Q
4	Karl Fleschen	West Germany	3:42.09	
5	Rolf Gysin	Switzerland	3:42.69	
6	Luis Medina	Cuba	3:42.71	
7	Lars Kaupang	Norway	3:44.59	
8	Spilios Zaxaropoulos	Greece	3:45.12	
9	Muhammad Siddique	Pakistan	3:45.59	

=== Semifinals ===
==== Semifinal 1 ====
Rank	Athlete	Nation	Time	Notes
1	John Walker	New Zealand	3:39.65	Q
2	Graham Crouch	Australia	3:39.86	Q
3	David Moorcroft	Great Britain	3:39.88	Q
4	Janos Zemen	Hungary	3:39.94	Q
5	Thomas Wessinghage	West Germany	3:40.06	
6	Steve Ovett	Great Britain	3:40.34	
7	Herman Mignon	Belgium	3:40.92	
8	Fernando Pacheco Mamede	Portugal	3:42.59	
—	David Hill	Canada	DNF	

==== Semifinal 2 ====
Rank	Athlete	Nation	Time	Notes
1	Eamonn Coghlan	Ireland	3:38.60	Q
2	Rick Wohlhuter	United States	3:38.71	Q
3	Ivo Van Damme	Belgium	3:38.75	Q
4	Frank Clement	Great Britain	3:38.92	Q
5	Paul-Heinz Wellmann	West Germany	3:38.99	q
6	Francis Gonzalez	France	3:40.73	
7	Paul Craig	Canada	3:41.02	
8	Marc Nevens	Belgium	3:41.52	
9	Helder Baiona De Jesus	Portugal	3:47.37	

=== Final ===
Rank	Athlete	Nation	Time
1st place, gold medalist(s)	John Walker	New Zealand	3:39.17
2nd place, silver medalist(s)	Ivo Van Damme	Belgium	3:39.27
3rd place, bronze medalist(s)	Paul-Heinz Wellmann	West Germany	3:39.33
4	Eamonn Coghlan	Ireland	3:39.51
5	Frank Clement	Great Britain	3:39.65
6	Rick Wohlhuter	United States	3:40.64
7	David Moorcroft	Great Britain	3:40.94
8	Graham Crouch	Australia	3:41.80
9	Janos Zemen	Hungary	3:43.02

== See also ==
- 1978 Men's European Championships 1,500 metres (Prague)
- 1982 Men's European Championships 1,500 metres (Athens)
- 1983 Men's World Championships 1,500 metres (Helsinki)
