= Athletics at the 1980 Summer Olympics – Men's 1500 metres =

Men's 1500 metres at the Games of the XXII Olympiad
- Olympic Athletics
- Venue: Lenin Central Stadium
- Date: 30 July 1980 (qualification); 31 July 1980 (semi-finals); 1 August 1980 (final)
- Competitors: 40 from 29 nations
- Winning time: 3:38.4

Medalists
1st place, gold medalist(s)		Sebastian Coe; Great Britain
2nd place, silver medalist(s)		Jürgen Straub; East Germany
3rd place, bronze medalist(s)		Steve Ovett; Great Britain

Official Video

The men's 1,500m metres was an event at the 1980 Summer Olympics in Moscow, Soviet Union. The final was held on Friday 1 August 1980. Forty athletes from 29 nations competed. The maximum number of athletes per nation had been set at 3 since the 1930 Olympic Congress. The event was won by 0.4 seconds by Sebastian Coe of Great Britain, the nation's first championship in the event since back-to-back wins surrounding World War I in 1912 and 1920, and first medal of any color since 1932. East Germany took its first medal in the 1500 metres since starting to compete separately, with Jürgen Straub's silver.

== Background ==
This was the 19th appearance of the event, which is one of 12 athletics events to have been held at every Summer Olympics. None of the 1976 finalists returned, with the American-led boycott keeping out defending champion John Walker of New Zealand as well as top American runner Steve Scott. Those two would have been strong challengers, but a British pair would have been co-favorites anyway. The world record was shared by Steve Ovett and Sebastian Coe, with Coe having a slightly faster time before the rounding required by the rules of the time. The British Olympic Association did not join the boycott, so Ovett and Coe raced in Moscow.

Benin, Botswana, Kuwait, Lesotho, Libya, Mozambique, Sierra Leone, Syria, Vietnam, and Zambia each made their first appearance in the event. Great Britain and France each made their 17th appearance, most of those competing in 1980, though still one fewer than the United States (which had had runners in each of the 18 previous 1500 metres competitions).

== Competition format ==
The competition was again three rounds (used previously in 1952 and since 1964). The "fastest loser" system introduced in 1964 was used for both the first round and semifinals. The 9-man semifinals and finals from 1976 were retained.

There were four heats in the first round, each with 10 or 11 runners (before withdrawals). The top four runners in each heat, along with the next two fastest overall, advanced to the semifinals. The 18 semifinalists were divided into two semifinals, each with 9 runners. The top four men in each semifinal, plus the fastest fifth-placer, advanced to the 9-man final.

== Records ==
These were the standing world and Olympic records prior to the 1980 Summer Olympics.

World record	Sebastian Coe (GBR)	3:32.1	Zürich, Switzerland	15 August 1979
Olympic record	Kip Keino (KEN)	3:34.9	Mexico City, Mexico	20 October 1968

No new world or Olympic records were set during the competition.

== Schedule ==
All times are Moscow Time (UTC+3)

Date	Time	Round
Wednesday, 30 July 1980	17:10	Round 1
Thursday, 31 July 1980	21:00	Semifinals
Friday, 1 August 1980	17:30	Final

== Results ==
=== Round 1 ===
==== Heat 1 ====
Rank	Athlete	Nation	Time	Notes
1	José Marajo	France	3:43.9	Q
2	Mehdi Aidet	Algeria	3:43.9	Q
3	Dragan Zdravković	Yugoslavia	3:44.0	Q
4	Steve Cram	Great Britain	3:44.1	Q
5	Pavel Yakovlev	Soviet Union	3:44.2	
6	José Manuel Abascal	Spain	3:44.7	
7	Mopeli Molapo	Lesotho	3:55.5	
8	Khaled Khalifa Al-Shammari	Kuwait	3:57.6	
9	Vicente Santos	Mozambique	3:58.7	
—	Filbert Bayi	Tanzania	DNS	

==== Heat 2 ====
Rank	Athlete	Nation	Time	Notes
1	Andreas Busse	East Germany	3:44.3	Q
2	Vitaliy Tyshchenko	Soviet Union	3:44.4	Q
3	Jozef Plachý	Czechoslovakia	3:44.4	Q
4	Alexandre Gonzalez	France	3:44.6	Q
5	Pierre Délèze	Switzerland	3:44.8	
6	Haile Zeru	Ethiopia	3:45.7	
7	Abderrahmane Morceli	Algeria	3:46.0	
8	Sant Kumar	India	3:55.6	
9	Ishmael Mhaladi	Botswana	3:59.1	
10	George Branche	Sierra Leone	4:03.9	
11	Damien Degboe	Benin	4:15.3	

==== Heat 3 ====
Rank	Athlete	Nation	Time	Notes
1	Vittorio Fontanella	Italy	3:40.1	Q
2	Sebastian Coe	Great Britain	3:40.1	Q
3	Antti Loikkanen	Finland	3:40.5	Q
4	José Luis González	Spain	3:40.9	Q
5	João Campos	Portugal	3:41.3	q
6	Ray Flynn	Ireland	3:42.0	
7	Nigusse Bekele	Ethiopia	3:45.8	
8	Archfell Musango	Zambia	3:53.7	
9	Tisbite Rakotoarisoa	Madagascar	3:55.9	
10	Lê Quang Khải	Vietnam	4:06.8	

==== Heat 4 ====
Rank	Athlete	Nation	Time	Notes
1	Steve Ovett	Great Britain	3:36.8	Q
2	Jürgen Straub	East Germany	3:37.0	Q
3	Robert Nemeth	Austria	3:38.3	Q
4	Vladimir Malozemlin	Soviet Union	3:38.7	Q
5	Mirosław Żerkowski	Poland	3:39.2	q
6	Kassa Balcha	Ethiopia	3:43.1	
7	Jón Didriksson	Iceland	3:44.4	
8	Derradji Harek	Algeria	3:45.3	
9	Marzouk Mabrouk	Libya	3:54.3	
10	Mohamed Makhlouf	Syria	4:00.4	

=== Semifinals ===
==== Semifinal 1 ====
Rank	Athlete	Nation	Time	Notes
1	Steve Ovett	Great Britain	3:43.1	Q
2	Dragan Zdravković	Yugoslavia	3:43.4	Q
3	Andreas Busse	East Germany	3:43.5	Q
4	Steve Cram	Great Britain	3:43.6	Q
5	Vladimir Malozemlin	Soviet Union	3:43.6	
6	Antti Loikkanen	Finland	3:44.0	
7	João Campos	Portugal	3:44.4	
8	Alex Gonzalez	France	3:44.7	
9	Mehdi Aidet	Algeria	3:44.9	

==== Semifinal 2 ====
Rank	Athlete	Nation	Time	Notes
1	Sebastian Coe	Great Britain	3:39.4	Q
2	Jürgen Straub	East Germany	3:39.4	Q
3	José Marajo	France	3:39.6	Q
4	Vittorio Fontanella	Italy	3:40.1	Q
5	Jozef Plachý	Czechoslovakia	3:40.4	q
6	Robert Nemeth	Austria	3:40.8	
7	Vitaliy Tyshchenko	Soviet Union	3:41.5	
8	José Luis González	Spain	3:42.6	
9	Mirosław Żerkowski	Poland	3:48.2	

=== Final ===
Rank	Athlete	Nation	Time
1st place, gold medalist(s)	Sebastian Coe	Great Britain	3:38.4
2nd place, silver medalist(s)	Jürgen Straub	East Germany	3:38.8
3rd place, bronze medalist(s)	Steve Ovett	Great Britain	3:39.0
4	Andreas Busse	East Germany	3:40.2
5	Vittorio Fontanella	Italy	3:40.4
6	Jozef Plachý	Czechoslovakia	3:40.7
7	José Marajo	France	3:41.5
8	Steve Cram	Great Britain	3:42.0
9	Dragan Zdravković	Yugoslavia	3:43.1

== See also ==
- 1976 Men's Olympic 1,500 metres (Montreal)
- 1978 Men's European Championships 1,500 metres (Prague)
- 1982 Men's European Championships 1,500 metres (Athens)
- 1983 Men's World Championships 1,500 metres (Helsinki)
- 1984 Men's Olympic 1,500 metres (Los Angeles)
