= 1979 European Athletics Indoor Championships – Men's 1500 metres =

The men's 1500 metres event at the 1979 European Athletics Indoor Championships was held on 24 and 25 February in Vienna.

== Medalists ==
Gold	Silver	Bronze
Eamonn Coghlan; Ireland	Thomas Wessinghage; West Germany	John Robson; Great Britain

== Results ==
=== Heats ===
First 4 from each heat (Q) qualified directly for the final.

Rank	Heat	Name	Nationality	Time	Notes
1	2	Thomas Wessinghage	West Germany	3:44.6	Q
2	2	Ray Flynn	Ireland	3:45.1	Q
3	2	John Robson	Great Britain	3:45.3	Q
4	2	Marc Nevens	Belgium	3:45.5	Q
5	1	Eamonn Coghlan	Ireland	3:45.6	Q
6	1	Harald Hudak	West Germany	3:46.1	Q
7	1	Antti Loikkanen	Finland	3:46.4	Q
8	1	Wybo Lelieveld	Netherlands	3:46.4	Q
9	2	Joost Borm	Netherlands	3:46.6	
10	1	Laurent Rutton	France	3:46.8	
11	1	Jozef Plachý	Czechoslovakia	3:47.1	
12	1	Claudio Patrignani	Italy	3:47.6	
13	2	Vinko Pokrajčić	Yugoslavia	3:48.2	
14	1	Erwin Wagger	Austria	3:49.4	
15	1	Ruben Sørensen	Denmark	3:50.8	
16	2	Arpad Bari	Czechoslovakia	3:50.9	

=== Final ===
Rank	Name	Nationality	Time	Notes
1st place, gold medalist(s)	Eamonn Coghlan	Ireland	3:41.8	SB
2nd place, silver medalist(s)	Thomas Wessinghage	West Germany	3:42.2	SB
3rd place, bronze medalist(s)	John Robson	Great Britain	3:42.8	PB
4	Antti Loikkanen	Finland	3:44.7	SB
5	Marc Nevens	Belgium	3:45.2	PB
6	Harald Hudak	West Germany	3:45.9	PB
7	Ray Flynn	Ireland	3:51.5	
8	Wybo Lelieveld	Netherlands	3:55.4	
