= 1978 European Athletics Indoor Championships – Men's 1500 metres =

The men's 1500 metres event at the 1978 European Athletics Indoor Championships was held on 11 and 12 March in Milan.

== Medalists ==
Gold	Silver	Bronze
Antti Loikkanen; Finland	Olaf Beyer; West Germany	Jürgen Straub; East Germany

== Results ==
=== Heats ===
First 2 from each heat (Q) and the next 2 fastest (q) qualified for the final.

Rank	Heat	Name	Nationality	Time	Notes
1	1	Eberhard Helm	West Germany	3:43.3	Q
2	1	János Zemen	Hungary	3:43.4	Q
3	1	Bernhard Vifian	Switzerland	3:43.9	
4	1	Henryk Wasilewski	Poland	3:45.7	
5	1	Robert Nemeth	Austria	3:47.4	
6	1	Kor Louws	Netherlands	3:52.7	
1	2	Francis Gonzalez	France	3:39.6	Q
2	2	Antti Loikkanen	Finland	3:39.6	Q
3	2	Tamás Szántó	Hungary	3:40.7	q
4	2	Joost Borm	Netherlands	3:43.2	q
5	2	Vittorio Fontanella	Italy	3:52.7	
1	3	Thomas Wessinghage	West Germany		Q
2	3	Jürgen Straub	East Germany		Q
3	3	José Manuel Abascal	Spain		q
4	3	Anatoliy Mamontov	Soviet Union		q
5	3	András Zsinka	Hungary		
6	3	Wybo Lelieveld	Netherlands		
7	3	Juhani Sams	Finland		

Note: The judges had the competitors in heat 3 run one extra lap by mistake, so no times were recorded. After much deliberation and protests, it was decided to let four runners from that heat to the final.

=== Final ===
Rank	Name	Nationality	Time	Notes
1st place, gold medalist(s)	Antti Loikkanen	Finland	3:38.16	CR, NR
2nd place, silver medalist(s)	Thomas Wessinghage	West Germany	3:38.23	
3rd place, bronze medalist(s)	Jürgen Straub	East Germany	3:40.2	
4	José Manuel Abascal	Spain	3:40.3	
5	Anatoliy Mamontov	Soviet Union	3:41.1	NR
6	János Zemen	Hungary	3:43.0	
7	Francis Gonzalez	France	3:43.4	
8	Joost Borm	Netherlands	3:45.2	
9	Eberhard Helm	West Germany	3:46.8	
10	Tamás Szántó	Hungary	3:49.0	
