= 1975 European Athletics Indoor Championships – Men's 1500 metres =

The men's 1500 metres event at the 1975 European Athletics Indoor Championships was held on 8 and 9 March in Katowice.

== Medalists ==
Gold	Silver	Bronze
Thomas Wessinghage; West Germany	Pyotr Anisim; Soviet Union	Gheorghe Ghipu; Romania

== Results ==
=== Heats ===
Held on 8 March.
First 2 from each heat (Q) and the next 2 fastest (q) qualified for the semifinals.

Rank	Heat	Name	Nationality	Time	Notes
1	1	Henryk Szordykowski	Poland	3:45.0	Q
2	1	Anatoliy Mamontov	Soviet Union	3:45.1	Q
3	1	Phil Banning	Great Britain	3:45.4	q
4	2	Thomas Wessinghage	West Germany	3:46.3	Q
5	2	Michał Skowronek	Poland	3:46.3	Q
6	2	Werner Meier	Switzerland	3:46.5	q
7	2	Petre Lupan	Romania	3:46.9	
8	3	Pyotr Anisim	Soviet Union	3:47.1	Q
9	3	Gheorghe Ghipu	Romania	3:47.2	Q
10	3	Jürgen Straub	East Germany	3:47.7	
11	3	Francis Gonzalez	France	3:47.9	
12	3	Lesław Zając	Poland	3:48.0	
13	2	Walter Wilkinson	Great Britain	3:48.5	
14	3	Štefan Polák	Czechoslovakia	3:48.6	
15	1	Ruben Sørensen	Denmark	3:49.9	
16	1	Paul-Heinz Wellmann	West Germany	3:51.1	
17	2	Alain Caron	France	3:53.1	
18	1	Åke Svenson	Sweden	3:55.5	
19	3	José Antonio Martínez	Spain	4:00.4	

=== Final ===
Held on 9 March.

Rank	Name	Nationality	Time	Notes
1st place, gold medalist(s)	Thomas Wessinghage	West Germany	3:44.6	
2nd place, silver medalist(s)	Pyotr Anisim	Soviet Union	3:45.4	
3rd place, bronze medalist(s)	Gheorghe Ghipu	Romania	3:45.4	
4	Anatoliy Mamontov	Soviet Union	3:47.0	
5	Michał Skowronek	Poland	3:49.1	
6	Henryk Szordykowski	Poland	3:55.4	
7	Werner Meier	Switzerland	3:58.9	
	Phil Banning	Great Britain	DNF	
