= 1980 European Athletics Indoor Championships – Men's 1500 metres =

The men's 1500 metres event at the 1980 European Athletics Indoor Championships was held on 1 and 2 March in Sindelfingen.

== Medalists ==
Gold	Silver	Bronze
Thomas Wessinghage; West Germany	Ray Flynn; Ireland	Pierre Délèze; Switzerland

== Results ==
=== Heats ===
First 3 from each heat (Q) and the next 2 fastest (q) qualified for the final.

Rank	Heat	Name	Nationality	Time	Notes
1	1	José Manuel Abascal	Spain	3:40.5	Q
2	1	Uwe Becker	West Germany	3:40.6	Q
3	1	Vladimir Malozemlin	Soviet Union	3:40.7	Q
4	1	Carlos Cabral	Portugal	3:40.8	q
5	2	Thomas Wessinghage	West Germany	3:42.0	Q
6	2	Pierre Délèze	Switzerland	3:42.0	Q
7	2	Ray Flynn	Ireland	3:42.8	Q
8	2	Malcolm Edwards	Great Britain	3:43.1	q
9	2	Didier Begouin	France	3:43.9	
10	2	Eberhard Helm	West Germany	3:44.0	
11	1	Gerard Pajot	France	3:44.2	
12	1	Federico Leporati	Italy	3:44.4	
13	1	Joost Borm	Netherlands	3:44.9	
14	1	Jón Didriksson	Iceland	3:45.6	NR
15	2	Claudio Patrignani	Italy	3:46.2	
16	1	Paul Williams	Great Britain	3:46.4	
17	2	Marc Nevens	Belgium	3:47.7	

=== Final ===
Rank	Name	Nationality	Time	Notes
1st place, gold medalist(s)	Thomas Wessinghage	West Germany	3:37.54	AR
2nd place, silver medalist(s)	Ray Flynn	Ireland	3:38.5	
3rd place, bronze medalist(s)	Pierre Délèze	Switzerland	3:38.9	
4	Uwe Becker	West Germany	3:39.8	
5	Carlos Cabral	Portugal	3:39.9	
6	Malcolm Edwards	Great Britain	3:43.0	
7	Vladimir Malozemlin	Soviet Union	3:44.5	
8	José Manuel Abascal	Spain	3:45.3	
