= Athletics at the 1983 Summer Universiade – Men's 1500 metres =

The men's 1500 metres event at the 1983 Summer Universiade was held at the Commonwealth Stadium in Edmonton, Canada with the final on 7 and 9 July 1983.

== Medalists ==
Gold	Silver	Bronze
Claudio Patrignani; Italy	Andreas Baranski; West Germany	Geoff Turnbull; Great Britain

== Results ==
=== Heats ===
Rank	Heat	Athlete	Nationality	Time	Notes
1	1	Mark Fricker	United States	3:41.68	Q
2	1	David Reid	Canada	3:41.88	Q
3	1	Claudio Patrignani	Italy	3:42.40	Q
4	1	Harald Hudak	West Germany	3:42.49	Q
5	1	Benjamin Fernández	Spain	3:42.95	Q
6	1	Bruno Tabourin	France	3:43.32	q
7	1	Jama Aden	Somalia	3:44.60	q
8	2	Geoff Turnbull	Great Britain	3:44.76	Q
9	2	Anatoliy Kalutskiy	Soviet Union	3:44.97	Q
10	2	Andreas Baranski	West Germany	3:44.98	Q
11	2	Stefano Mei	Italy	3:44.99	Q
12	2	Andrés Vera	Spain	3:45.04	Q
13	2	Marc Olesen	Canada	3:45.22	
14	2	Vinko Pokrajčić	Yugoslavia	3:51.10	
15	2	Wang Bin	China	3:51.44	
16	2	Roberto López	Mexico	3:52.29	
17	1	Hugo Allan García	Guatemala	4:01.03	
18	1	Gideon Mthembu	Swaziland	4:08.01	
19	2	Carlos Quevedo	Guatemala	4:16.01	
20	1	Mohamad Fathi	Libya	4:33.32	

=== Final ===
Rank	Athlete	Nationality	Time	Notes
1st place, gold medalist(s)	Claudio Patrignani	Italy	3:41.02	
2nd place, silver medalist(s)	Andreas Baranski	West Germany	3:41.21	
3rd place, bronze medalist(s)	Geoff Turnbull	Great Britain	3:41.24	
4	Andrés Vera	Spain	3:41.27	
5	Stefano Mei	Italy	3:41.81	
6	Anatoliy Kalutskiy	Soviet Union	3:42.44	
7	David Reid	Canada	3:43.06	
8	Benjamin Fernández	Spain	3:44.21	
9	Bruno Tabourin	France	3:44.68	
10	Harald Hudak	West Germany	3:45.64	
11	Mark Fricker	United States	3:46.95	
12	Jama Aden	Somalia	3:47.03	
