= Athletics at the 1979 Summer Universiade – Men's 1500 metres =

The men's 1500 metres event at the 1979 Summer Universiade was held at the Estadio Olimpico Universitario in Mexico City on 8 and 9 September 1979.

== Medalists ==
| Gold | Silver | Bronze |
|---|---|---|
| Graham Williamson; Great Britain | Pierre Délèze; Switzerland | Richie Harris; United States |

== Results ==
=== Heats ===
| Rank | Heat | Athlete | Nationality | Time | Notes |
|---|---|---|---|---|---|
| 1 | 2 | Graham Williamson | Great Britain | 3:53.76 | Q |
| 2 | 1 | Pierre Délèze | Switzerland | 3:53.79 | Q |
| 3 | 2 | Richie Harris | United States | 3:54.03 | Q |
| 4 | 1 | Tom Duits | United States | 3:54.12 | Q |
| 5 | 1 | Christos Papachristos | Greece | 3:54.24 | Q |
| 6 | 1 | Hamad Hussein | Saudi Arabia | 3:54.24 | Q |
| 7 | 2 | Carlo Grippo | Italy | 3:54.68 | Q |
| 8 | 2 | John Bowan | New Zealand | 3:55.03 | Q |
| 9 | 1 | Takao Nakamura | Japan | 3:55.26 | Q |
| 10 | 2 | Ignacio Melesio | Mexico | 3:55.76 | Q |
| 11 | 1 | Saïd Aouita | Morocco | 3:56.15 | q |
| 12 | 1 | Filemón López | Mexico | 3:56.87 | q |
| 13 | 1 | Michael Feurtado | Jamaica | 3:58.56 | |
| 14 | 2 | Uwe Becker | West Germany | 3:58.59 | |
| 15 | 2 | Manuel Bernardo | Angola | 4:02.95 | |
| 16 | 2 | Peter Lindtner | Austria | 4:07.49 | |
| | 1 | David Hoey | Australia | DNS | |
| | 2 | Steve Foley | Australia | DNS | |

=== Final ===
| Rank | Athlete | Nationality | Time | Notes |
|---|---|---|---|---|
| 1st place, gold medalist(s) | Graham Williamson | Great Britain | 3:45.37 | |
| 2nd place, silver medalist(s) | Pierre Délèze | Switzerland | 3:45.8 | |
| 3rd place, bronze medalist(s) | Richie Harris | United States | 3:46.4 | |
| 4 | Abderrahmane Morceli | Algeria | 3:49.5 | |
| 5 | Takao Nakamura | Japan | 3:50.7 | |
| 6 | Filemón López | Mexico | 3:50.7 | |
| 7 | Ignacio Melesio | Mexico | 3:51.3 | |
| 8 | Christos Papachristos | Greece | 3:52.2 | |
| 9 | John Bowan | New Zealand | ?:??.? | |
| 10 | Tom Duits | United States | ?:??.? | |
| 11 | Saïd Aouita | Morocco | ?:??.? | |
| | Vittorio Fontanella | Italy | DNF | |
