= Niall O'Shaughnessy =

Irish middle-distance runner

Personal information
- Nationality: Irish
- Born: November 23, 1955 Kilknockan, County Limerick, Ireland
- Died: September 16, 2015 (aged 59) Alpharetta, Georgia, United States
- Height: 169 cm (5 ft 7 in)
- Weight: 59 kg (130 lb)

Sport
- Sport: Athletics
- Event: middle-distance
- Club: Arkansas Razorbacks

Niall O'Shaughnessy (November 23, 1955 – September 16, 2015) was an Irish track and field athlete, specializing in middle distances. He competed at the 1976 Summer Olympics.

== Biography ==
O'Shaughnessy came from Kilknockan, Adare, County Limerick and attended St Munchin's College but was recruited by Irishman John McDonnell to the University of Arkansas in the United States where he eventually settled. He was the 1974 Southwest Conference champion in the indoor 880. He was All American in cross-country, indoor track, and outdoor track. He was inducted into the University of Arkansas Athletic Hall of Honor in 1994.

O'Shaughnessy finished third behind Steve Ovett in the 800 metres event at the 1975 AAA Championships.

At the 1976 Olympic Games, he represented Ireland in the 800 metres and 1500 metres. In the 1500 metres, he finished less than .2 behind former 880 world record holder Rick Wohlhuter who took the last qualifying spot in his heat behind eventual double silver medalist Ivo Van Damme and bronze medalist Paul-Heinz Wellmann. Earlier in the 800, Van Damme had also defeated O'Shaughnessy in the heats, en route to his other silver medal.

He later gained American citizenship and became an engineer in Little Rock and Atlanta.

O'Shaughnessy died at 59 as a consequence of brain cancer. After his death he was inducted into the Southwest Conference Hall of Fame.
