= 1982 European Athletics Championships – Men's 1500 metres =

Men's 1500 metres at the European Athletics Championships

These are the official results of the Men's 1,500 metres event at the 1982 European Championships in Athens, Greece, held at Olympic Stadium "Spiros Louis" on 9 and 11 September 1982.

== Medalists ==
Gold	Steve Cram; Great Britain
Silver	Nikolay Kirov; Soviet Union
Bronze	José Manuel Abascal; Spain

== Results ==
=== Final ===
11 September

Rank	Name	Nationality	Time	Notes
1st place, gold medalist(s)	Steve Cram	Great Britain	3:36.49	
2nd place, silver medalist(s)	Nikolay Kirov	Soviet Union	3:36.99	
3rd place, bronze medalist(s)	José Manuel Abascal	Spain	3:37.04	
4	Robert Nemeth	Austria	3:37.81	
5	Vitaliy Tyshchenko	Soviet Union	3:38.15	
6	Uwe Becker	West Germany	3:38.17	
7	Pierre Délèze	Switzerland	3:39.64	
8	Ray Flynn	Ireland	3:40.44	
9	Dragan Zdravković	Yugoslavia	3:42.44	
10	Vinko Pokrajčić	Yugoslavia	3:44.00	
11	Andreas Busse	East Germany	3:44.50	
	Graham Williamson	Great Britain	DNF	

=== Heats ===
9 September

==== Heat 1 ====
Rank	Name	Nationality	Time	Notes
1	Pierre Délèze	Switzerland	3:42.75	Q
2	Graham Williamson	Great Britain	3:43.01	Q
3	Dragan Zdravković	Yugoslavia	3:43.02	Q
4	Claudio Patrignani	Italy	3:43.12	
5	Mirosław Żerkowski	Poland	3:43.46	
6	Alexandre Gonzalez	France	3:43.70	
7	Hristos Papahristos	Greece	3:44.12	
8	Arno Körmeling	Netherlands	3:44.18	
9	Jan Persson	Sweden	3:44.94	
10	Antonio Atabao	Portugal	3:46.99	
11	John Chappory	Gibraltar	3:57.91	

==== Heat 2 ====
Rank	Name	Nationality	Time	Notes
1	José Manuel Abascal	Spain	3:40.32	Q
2	Uwe Becker	West Germany	3:40.50	Q
3	Andreas Busse	East Germany	3:40.53	Q
4	Nikolay Kirov	Soviet Union	3:40.91	q
5	João Campos	Portugal	3:42.74	
6	Johnny Kroon	Sweden	3:42.75	
7	Dave Taylor	Ireland	3:43.86	
8	Jón Diðriksson	Iceland	3:44.03	
9	Sermet Timurlenk	Turkey	3:44.24	
10	Philippe Dien	France	3:45.13	

==== Heat 3 ====
Rank	Name	Nationality	Time	Notes
1	Steve Cram	Great Britain	3:38.06	Q
2	Vitaliy Tyshchenko	Soviet Union	3:38.46	Q
3	Ray Flynn	Ireland	3:38.62	Q
4	Robert Nemeth	Austria	3:39.57	q
5	Vinko Pokrajčić	Yugoslavia	3:40.86	q
6	Justin Gloden	Luxembourg	3:41.62	
7	Carlos Cabral	Portugal	3:42.29	
8	Stefano Mei	Italy	3:43.05	

== Participation ==
According to an unofficial count, 29 athletes from 20 countries participated in the event.

- Austria (1)
- East Germany (1)
- France (2)
- Gibraltar (1)
- Great Britain (2)
- Greece (1)
- Iceland (1)
- Ireland (2)
- Italy (2)
- Luxembourg (1)
- Netherlands (1)
- Poland (1)
- Portugal (3)
- Soviet Union (2)
- Spain (1)
- Sweden (2)
- Switzerland (1)
- Turkey (1)
- West Germany (1)
- Yugoslavia (2)

== See also ==
- 1978 Men's European Championships 1,500 metres (Prague)
- 1980 Men's Olympic 1,500 metres (Moscow)
- 1983 Men's World Championships 1,500 metres (Helsinki)
- 1984 Men's Olympic 1,500 metres (Los Angeles)
- 1986 Men's European Championships 1,500 metres (Stuttgart)
- 1987 Men's World Championships 1,500 metres (Rome)
