= Athletics at the 1976 Summer Olympics – Men's 800 metres =

Men's 800 metres at the Games of the XXI Olympiad
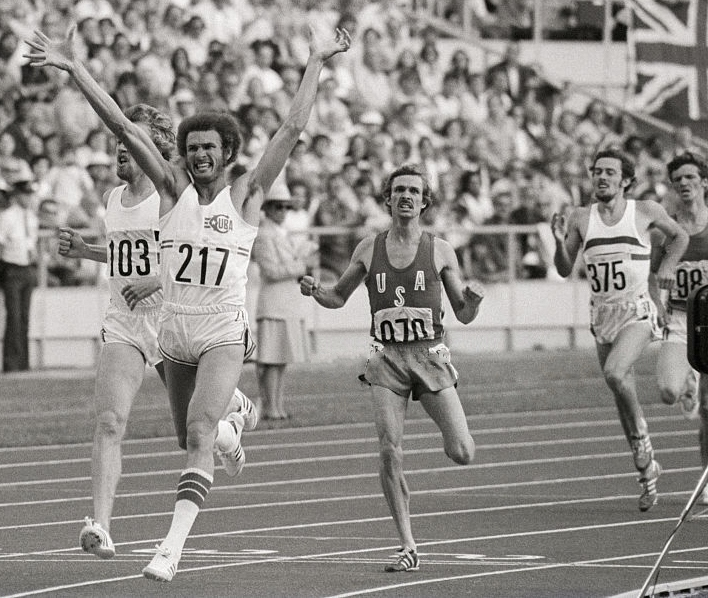
- 800 m final, left-right: Van Damme, Juantorena, Wohlhuter, Ovett, Sušanj
- Venue: Olympic Stadium
- Date: 23 July 1976 (heats); 24 July 1976 (semi-finals); 25 July 1976 (final)
- Competitors: 42 from 31 nations
- Winning time: 1:43.5 WR

Medalists
1st place, gold medalist(s)		Alberto Juantorena; Cuba
2nd place, silver medalist(s)		Ivo van Damme; Belgium
3rd place, bronze medalist(s)		Rick Wohlhuter; United States

The men's 800 metres event at the 1976 Summer Olympics in Montreal was held on July 23, 1976, July 24, 1976, and on July 25, 1976. Forty-two athletes from 31 nations competed. The maximum number of athletes per nation had been set at 3 since the 1930 Olympic Congress. The event was won by 0.36 seconds by Alberto Juantorena of Cuba, the nation's first medal in the event; Juantorena would later complete an unusual double in winning the 400 metres as well. Ivo van Damme's silver was Belgium's first medal in the event since 1960, matching the 1960 silver for best result for the nation.

== Summary ==
From the gun Alberto Juantorena took an apparent lead against the field through the staggered start. Passing the break at 300 metres, the long striding Cuban was a couple of steps ahead of the noticeably smaller American Rick Wohlhuter. Sriram Singh came from more than 10 metres back at the break to sprint past Juantorena and the rest of the field, to take the lead just after the bell. Singh's lead was short lived as the field bunched then started to make their way around him. Wohlhuter stuck less than a mere step behind Juantorena all the way through the final turn as Ivo van Damme, Willi Wülbeck and future champion Steve Ovett jockeyed for position. Coming off the turn, Juantorena found more speed to pull away from Wohlhuter. As he struggled down the home stretch, Wohlhuter was passed by van Damme 20 metres before the finish.

Juantorena's 1:43.5 (rounded down from the electronic time of 1:43.50) broke Marcello Fiasconaro's hand timed world record of 1:43.7. Despite the erratic pace, Singh's time in 7th place stood as the Asian record until it was broken by Lee Jin-il in 1994.

== Background ==
This was the 18th appearance of the event, which is one of 12 athletics events to have been held at every Summer Olympics. None of the 1972 finalists returned; the Kenyan boycott kept Munich bronze medalist and would-be favorite Mike Boit out. Marcello Fiasconaro of Italy, who had set the world record in 1973, was injured and unable to compete. The favorites among the athletes who did appear were Alberto Juantorena of Cuba, Rick Wohlhuter of the United States, and Ivo van Damme of Belgium.

Barbados, Saudi Arabia, and Suriname appeared in the event for the first time. Great Britain and the United States each made their 17th appearance, tied for the most among all nations.

== Competition format ==
The competition used the three-round format that had been in use for most Games since 1912. The "fastest loser" system introduced in 1964 was used for the first round. There were six first-round heats, each with 7 or 8 athletes (before withdrawals); the top two runners in each heat as well as the next four fastest overall advanced to the semifinals. There were two semifinals with 8 athletes each; the top four runners in each semifinal advanced to the eight-man final.

== Records ==
Prior to the competition, the existing World and Olympic records were as follows.

World record	Marcello Fiasconaro (ITA)	1:43.7	Milan, Italy	27 June 1973
Olympic record	Ralph Doubell (AUS)	1:44.3	Mexico City, Mexico	15 October 1968

In the final, all three medalists ran under the Olympic record time. Alberto Juantorena won the event with the world record time of 1:43.50.

== Schedule ==
All times are Eastern Daylight Time (UTC-4)

Date	Time	Round
Friday, 23 July 1976	15:00	Round 1
Saturday, 24 July 1976	16:35	Semifinals
Sunday, 25 July 1976	17:15	Final

== Results ==
=== Round 1 ===
The first round was held on July 23, 1976.

==== Heat 1 ====
Rank	Athlete	Nation	Time	Notes
1	Rick Wohlhuter	United States	1:45.71	Q
2	Sriram Singh	India	1:45.86	Q
3	Leandro Civil	Cuba	1:45.88	q
4	Marian Gęsicki	Poland	1:46.36	q
5	Thomas Wessinghage	West Germany	1:46.56	q
6	Viktor Anokhin	Soviet Union	1:46.81	q
7	Muhammad Younis	Pakistan	1:48.50	

==== Heat 2 ====
Rank	Athlete	Nation	Time	Notes
1	Frank Clement	Great Britain	1:47.51	Q
2	James Robinson	United States	1:47.56	Q
3	John Walker	New Zealand	1:47.63	
4	Andrés Ballbé	Spain	1:48.38	
5	Fernando Mamede	Portugal	1:49.58	
6	Francisco Solis	Dominican Republic	1:55.56	
7	Wilnor Joseph	Haiti	2:15.26	

==== Heat 3 ====
Rank	Athlete	Nation	Time	Notes
1	Steve Ovett	Great Britain	1:48.27	Q
2	Seymour Newman	Jamaica	1:48.46	Q
3	Paul-Heinz Wellmann	West Germany	1:48.47	
4	Jozef Plachý	Czechoslovakia	1:48.63	
5	Günther Hasler	Liechtenstein	1:48.83	
6	Evert Hoving	Netherlands	1:48.99	
7	Roy Bottse	Suriname	1:49.85	
8	Erasmo Gómez	Nicaragua	1:57.97	

==== Heat 4 ====
Rank	Athlete	Nation	Time	Notes
1	Alberto Juantorena	Cuba	1:47.15	Q
2	Carlo Grippo	Italy	1:47.21	Q
3	János Zemen	Hungary	1:47.40	
4	Milovan Savić	Yugoslavia	1:47.73	
5	Jorge Ortíz	Puerto Rico	1:51.38	
—	Roqui Sanchez	France	DSQ	
—	Markku Taskinen	Finland	DNS	

==== Heat 5 ====
Rank	Athlete	Nation	Time	Notes
1	Willi Wülbeck	West Germany	1:48.47	Q
2	Horace Tuitt	Trinidad and Tobago	1:48.48	Q
3	Vladimir Ponomaryov	Soviet Union	1:48.59	
4	Åke Svensson	Sweden	1:48.86	
5	José Marajo	France	1:49.60	
6	Orlando Greene	Barbados	1:51.43	
7	Attiya Al-Qahtani	Saudi Arabia	1:57.67	

==== Heat 6 ====
Rank	Athlete	Nation	Time	Notes
1	Ivo van Damme	Belgium	1:47.80	Q
2	Luciano Sušanj	Yugoslavia	1:47.82	Q
3	Mark Enyeart	United States	1:47.96	
4	Rolf Gysin	Switzerland	1:48.69	
5	Niall O'Shaughnessy	Ireland	1:49.29	
6	Luis Medina	Cuba	1:50.15	
7	Marcel Philippe	France	1:50.81	

=== Semifinals ===
The semifinals were held on July 24, 1976.

==== Semifinal 1 ====
Rank	Athlete	Nation	Time	Notes
1	Alberto Juantorena	Cuba	1:45.88	Q
2	Ivo van Damme	Belgium	1:46.00	Q
3	Steve Ovett	Great Britain	1:46.14	Q
4	Sriram Singh	India	1:46.42	Q
5	James Robinson	United States	1:46.43	
6	Marian Gęsicki	Poland	1:47.06	
7	Thomas Wessinghage	West Germany	1:48.18	
—	Horace Tuitt	Trinidad and Tobago	DNF	

==== Semifinal 2 ====
Rank	Athlete	Nation	Time	Notes
1	Rick Wohlhuter	United States	1:46.72	Q
2	Carlo Grippo	Italy	1:46.95	Q
3	Luciano Sušanj	Yugoslavia	1:47.03	Q
4	Willi Wülbeck	West Germany	1:47.18	Q
5	Seymour Newman	Jamaica	1:47.22	
6	Leandro Civil	Cuba	1:47.31	
7	Viktor Anokhin	Soviet Union	1:47.71	
8	Frank Clement	Great Britain	1:48.28	

=== Final ===
The final was held on July 25, 1976.

Rank	Athlete	Nation	Time	Notes
1st place, gold medalist(s)	Alberto Juantorena	Cuba	1:43.50	WR
2nd place, silver medalist(s)	Ivo van Damme	Belgium	1:43.86	
3rd place, bronze medalist(s)	Rick Wohlhuter	United States	1:44.12	
4	Willi Wülbeck	West Germany	1:45.26	
5	Steve Ovett	Great Britain	1:45.44	
6	Luciano Sušanj	Yugoslavia	1:45.75	
7	Sriram Singh	India	1:45.77	
8	Carlo Grippo	Italy	1:48.39	

== See also ==
- 1972 Men's Olympic 800 metres (Munich)
- 1978 Men's European Championships 800 metres (Prague)
- 1980 Men's Olympic 800 metres (Moscow)
