= Athletics at the 1978 Commonwealth Games – Men's 1500 metres =

Men's 1500 metres at the Commonwealth Games

The men's 1500 metres event at the 1978 Commonwealth Games was held on 11 and 12 August at the Commonwealth Stadium in Edmonton, Alberta, Canada.

== Medalists ==
Gold	Silver	Bronze
David Moorcroft; England	Filbert Bayi; Tanzania	John Robson; Scotland

== Results ==
=== Heats ===
Held on 11 August

Qualification: First 5 in each heat (Q) and the next 2 fastest (q) qualify for the final.

Rank	Heat	Name	Nationality	Time	Notes
1	2	Filbert Bayi	Tanzania	3:38.76	Q
2	2	John Robson	Scotland	3:38.84	Q
3	2	Rod Dixon	New Zealand	3:39.03	Q
4	2	Kipsubai Koskei	Kenya	3:39.24	Q
5	2	James McGuinness	Northern Ireland	3:39.24	Q
6	2	Paul Craig	Canada	3:39.83	q
7	2	Tim Hutchings	England	3:40.57	q
8	1	Wilson Waigwa	Kenya	3:41.36	Q
9	1	Richard Tuwei	Kenya	3:41.41	Q
10	1	David Moorcroft	England	3:41.47	Q
11	1	Glen Grant	Wales	3:41.58	Q
12	1	Frank Clement	Scotland	3:41.63	Q
13	1	John Craig	Canada	3:42.66	
14	2	Dean Childs	Canada	3:44.32	
15	1	Paul Lawther	Northern Ireland	3:44.42	
16	2	Steve Cram	England	3:44.83	
17	1	Dennis Norris	New Zealand	3:45.96	
18	2	Steve Jones	Wales	3:49.35	
19	2	Michael Watson	Bermuda	3:50.38	
20	1	John Charvetto	Gibraltar	3:52.43	
21	1	John Davies	Wales	3:53.48	
22	2	Halidu Zinentah	Ghana	3:53.99	
23	1	Molapo Mopeli	Lesotho	4:00.27	
24	2	Conrad Francis	Grenada	4:07.13	
25	2	Nicholas Akers	Cayman Islands	4:10.29	
26	1	John Erysthee	Saint Lucia	4:13.94	
27	1	Lewis Swann	Turks and Caicos Islands	4:34.48	
28	2	Robert Ingham	Turks and Caicos Islands	4:45.36	
	1	Suleiman Nyambui	Tanzania	DNS	

=== Final ===
Held on 12 August

Rank	Name	Nationality	Time	Notes
1st place, gold medalist(s)	David Moorcroft	England	3:35.48	
2nd place, silver medalist(s)	Filbert Bayi	Tanzania	3:35.59	
3rd place, bronze medalist(s)	John Robson	Scotland	3:35.60	
4	Frank Clement	Scotland	3:35.66	
5	Wilson Waigwa	Kenya	3:37.49	
6	Glen Grant	Wales	3:38.05	
7	Richard Tuwei	Kenya	3:40.51	
8	Rod Dixon	New Zealand	3:41.34	
9	James McGuinness	Northern Ireland	3:42.59	
10	Tim Hutchings	England	3:43.05	
11	Paul Craig	Canada	3:43.42	
12	Kipsubai Koskei	Kenya	3:45.45	
