= 1984 European Athletics Indoor Championships – Men's 1500 metres =

The men's 1500 metres event at the 1984 European Athletics Indoor Championships was held on 3 and 4 March.

== Medalists ==
Gold	Silver	Bronze
Peter Wirz; Switzerland	Riccardo Materazzi; Italy	Thomas Wessinghage; West Germany

== Results ==
=== Heats ===
First 2 from each heat (Q) and the next 4 fastest (q) qualified for the final.

Rank	Heat	Name	Nationality	Time	Notes
1	1	Antti Loikkanen	Finland	3:40.51	Q
2	2	Riccardo Materazzi	Italy	3:42.62	Q
3	1	José Manuel Abascal	Spain	3:42.64	Q
4	2	Michel Wijnsberghe	Belgium	3:42.76	Q
5	2	Thomas Wessinghage	West Germany	3:42.94	q
6	2	Robert Nemeth	Austria	3:43.16	q
7	2	Peter Wirz	Switzerland	3:43.30	q
8	2	Grzegorz Basiak	Poland	3:43.61	q
9	1	Jaime López	Spain	3:43.67	
10	2	Moisés Fernández	Spain	3:43.84	
11	1	Claudio Patrignani	Italy	3:43.99	
12	1	Didier Begouin	France	3:44.19	
13	1	Andreas Baranski	West Germany	3:44.23	
14	1	Jonas Lundström	Sweden	3:47.04	
15	2	Igor Kristensen	Norway	3:47.11	
16	1	Mirosław Żerkowski	Poland	3:49.11	

=== Final ===
Rank	Name	Nationality	Time	Notes
1st place, gold medalist(s)	Peter Wirz	Switzerland	3:41.35	
2nd place, silver medalist(s)	Riccardo Materazzi	Italy	3:41.57	
3rd place, bronze medalist(s)	Thomas Wessinghage	West Germany	3:41.75	
4	Antti Loikkanen	Finland	3:42.42	
5	Grzegorz Basiak	Poland	3:42.71	
6	Robert Nemeth	Austria	3:43.28	
	Michel Wijnsberghe	Belgium	DQ	
	José Manuel Abascal	Spain	DNS	
