= 1983 European Athletics Indoor Championships – Men's 1500 metres =

The men's 1500 metres event at the 1983 European Athletics Indoor Championships was held on 5 and 6 March.

== Medalists ==
Gold	Silver	Bronze
Thomas Wessinghage; West Germany	José Manuel Abascal; Spain	Antti Loikkanen; Finland

== Results ==
=== Heats ===
First 3 from each heat (Q) and the next 3 fastest (q) qualified for the final.

Rank	Heat	Name	Nationality	Time	Notes
1	2	Peter Wirz	Switzerland	3:43.30	Q
2	2	Thomas Wessinghage	West Germany	3:43.31	Q
3	2	Andreas Baranski	West Germany	3:43.63	Q
4	2	Jaime López	Spain	3:43.92	q
5	2	Tamás Szabó	Hungary	3:43.97	q
6	2	Yorgos Petrakis	Greece	3:43.97	q
7	1	José Manuel Abascal	Spain	3:48.23	Q
8	1	Antti Loikkanen	Finland	3:48.43	Q
9	1	Claudio Patrignani	Italy	3:48.47	Q
10	1	Carlos Cabral	Portugal	3:48.52	
11	1	Béla Énekes	Hungary	3:48.96	
12	1	Janos Szvoboda	Hungary	3:50.12	
13	1	Didier Begouin	France	3:53.69	

=== Final ===
Rank	Name	Nationality	Time	Notes
1st place, gold medalist(s)	Thomas Wessinghage	West Germany	3:39.82	
2nd place, silver medalist(s)	José Manuel Abascal	Spain	3:40.39	
3rd place, bronze medalist(s)	Antti Loikkanen	Finland	3:41.31	
4	Peter Wirz	Switzerland	3:41.95	
5	Claudio Patrignani	Italy	3:41.99	
6	Andreas Baranski	West Germany	3:42.54	
7	Jaime López	Spain	3:42.96	
8	Tamás Szabó	Hungary	3:44.85	
9	Yorgos Petrakis	Greece	3:48.91	
