= 1982 European Athletics Indoor Championships – Men's 1500 metres =

The men's 1500 metres event at the 1982 European Athletics Indoor Championships was held on 6–7 March.

== Medalists ==
| Gold | Silver | Bronze |
|---|---|---|
| José Luis González; Spain | Martina Steuk; Spain | Antti Loikkanen; Finland |

== Results ==
=== Heats ===
First 3 from each heat (Q) and the next 2 fastest (q) qualified for the final.

| Rank | Heat | Name | Nationality | Time | Notes |
|---|---|---|---|---|---|
| 1 | 1 | Thomas Wessinghage | West Germany | 3:39.74 | Q |
| 2 | 1 | José Manuel Abascal | Spain | 3:40.14 | Q, NR |
| 3 | 2 | José Luis González | Spain | 3:40.86 | Q |
| 4 | 2 | Pierre Délèze | Switzerland | 3:41.28 | Q |
| 5 | 1 | Carlos Cabral | Portugal | 3:41.29 | Q |
| 6 | 2 | Antti Loikkanen | Finland | 3:41.62 | Q |
| 7 | 1 | Khristos Papakhristos | Greece | 3:41.67 | q, NR |
| 8 | 2 | Andreas Baranski | West Germany | 3:42.75 | q |
| 9 | 1 | Gianni Truschi | Italy | 3:44.02 | |
| 10 | 2 | Mirosław Żerkowski | Poland | 3:44.08 | |
| 11 | 2 | Willy Goddaert | Belgium | 3:44.13 | |
| 12 | 2 | Rosario Zingales | Italy | 3:44.34 | |
| 13 | 2 | Miguel Lindoso | Spain | 3:46.20 | |
| 14 | 1 | Riccardo Materazzi | Italy | 3:47.31 | |
| 15 | 1 | François Burdel | France | 3:48.38 | |
| 16 | 1 | László Tóth | Hungary | 3:49.38 | |
| 17 | 1 | Staffan Lundström | Sweden | 3:50.49 | |

=== Final ===
| Rank | Name | Nationality | Time | Notes |
|---|---|---|---|---|
| 1st place, gold medalist(s) | José Luis González | Spain | 3:38.70 | NR |
| 2nd place, silver medalist(s) | José Manuel Abascal | Spain | 3:38.91 | |
| 3rd place, bronze medalist(s) | Antti Loikkanen | Finland | 3:39.62 | |
| 4 | Thomas Wessinghage | West Germany | 3:39.79 | |
| 5 | Andreas Baranski | West Germany | 3:40.96 | |
| 6 | Carlos Cabral | Portugal | 3:41.24 | |
| 7 | Pierre Délèze | Switzerland | 3:41.38 | |
| 8 | Khristos Papakhristos | Greece | 3:49.26 | |
