= Athletics at the 1984 Summer Olympics – Men's 1500 metres =

Men's 1500 metres at the Games of the XXIII Olympiad
- Olympic Athletics
- Venue: Los Angeles Memorial Coliseum
- Dates: 9–11 August
- Competitors: 59 from 40 nations
- Winning time: 3:32.53 OR

Medalists
1st place, gold medalist(s)		Sebastian Coe; Great Britain
2nd place, silver medalist(s)		Steve Cram; Great Britain
3rd place, bronze medalist(s)		José Manuel Abascal; Spain

Official Video

The men's 1500 metres was an event at the 1984 Summer Olympics in Los Angeles, California. The final was held on August 11, 1984. Fifty-nine athletes from 40 nations competed. The maximum number of athletes per nation had been set at 3 since the 1930 Olympic Congress. The event was won by 0.87 seconds by Sebastian Coe of Great Britain, the first man to successfully defend an Olympic 1500 metres title. Steve Cram's silver made it the first time a nation had gone 1–2 in the event since Great Britain had done it in 1920. José Manuel Abascal's bronze was Spain's first medal in the event.

== Summary ==
From the start Omar Khalifa went to the lead, shadowed by Joseph Chesire with Sebastian Coe marking their lead in third. The first lap was 58.85. 500 metres into the race, Steve Scott ran around the leaders to take the point, Coe and José Manuel Abascal stringing out the field. They passed the 800 metre mark in a slightly faster 1:56.81. Abascal continued to speed up, passing Coe then Scott between 900 and 1000. Scott began to fall back through the field as Steve Cram and Steve Ovett moved forward. At the bell the three Brits were 2–4, three Steves were 3–5. Midway through the penultimate turn, suddenly the world record holder Ovett stepped inside of the curb and stopped. With 300 to go in an even faster 2:53.21, Abascal, Coe and Cram had three metres on Cheshire who accelerated around Scott and Jim Spivey as Ovett dropped out. Cram accelerated down the back stretch, Coe reacting, with about 220 metres to go, the leaders were three abreast across the track. Coe emerged ahead into the turn with Cram sprinting in his wake. Coe looked around to see where his competition was then focused on holding his position. Coming off the turn, Coe checked again, seeing Cram still a metre behind him, breaking away from Abascal. Coe sprinted away from Cram, checking again mid-straightaway to be sure his work was accomplished, then extending his lead to 6 metres by the finish. Cram had another 7 metres on Abascal who was able to hold off Cheshire for bronze. Coe became the only man to successfully defend his title in the 1500 metres. Coe turned back toward the press area and angrily showed them his index finger on both hands, indicating he was number one again. Still fresh after running less than 2 seconds off the world record, Coe jogged back still looking at that area of the stands and again showing his number one finger.

== Background ==
This was the 20th appearance of the event, which is one of 12 athletics events to have been held at every Summer Olympics. The only 1980 finalists to return were the three British runners: gold medalist Sebastian Coe, bronze medalist Steve Ovett, and eighth-place finisher Steve Cram. Coe and Ovett had been favorites then, with Cram not considered quite so highly; by 1984, however, they were a true triumvirate (with Cram winning the 1982 Commonwealth and European Championships and the inaugural 1983 World Championship; Ovett had set the world record in 1983; Coe was the defending Olympic champion) and a threat to sweep the podium. Their main competition was Steve Scott of the United States, who had been prevented from running at the 1980 Games due to the American-led boycott; Scott had taken second to Cram at the 1983 Worlds. Johan Fourie did not compete because of South Africa's apartheid ban.

Antigua and Barbuda, Equatorial Guinea, the Gambia, Guyana, Jordan, Niger, Oman, Rwanda, the Seychelles, Suriname, the United Arab Emirates, and Zimbabwe each made their first appearance in the event. The United States made its 19th appearance, most of all nations (having missed only the boycotted 1980 Games).

== Competition format ==
The competition was again three rounds (used previously in 1952 and since 1964). The "fastest loser" system introduced in 1964 was used for both the first round and semifinals. The 9-man semifinals and finals from 1976 and 1980 were replaced with 12-man races.

There were six heats in the first round, each with 10 or 11 runners (before withdrawals). The top three runners in each heat, along with the next six fastest overall, advanced to the semifinals. The 24 semifinalists were divided into two semifinals, each with 12 runners. The top four men in each semifinal, plus the next four fastest overall, advanced to the 12-man final.

== Records ==
These were the standing world and Olympic records prior to the 1984 Summer Olympics.

World record	Steve Ovett (GBR)	3:30.77	Rieti, Italy	4 September 1983
Olympic record	Kip Keino (KEN)	3:34.9	Mexico City, Mexico	20 October 1968

Sebastian Coe set a new Olympic record at 3:32.53 in the final.

== Schedule ==
All times are Pacific Daylight Time (UTC-7)

Date	Time	Round
Thursday, 9 August 1984	16:15	Round 1
Friday, 10 August 1984	17:40	Semifinals
Saturday, 11 August 1984	18:55	Final

== Results ==
=== Round 1 ===
==== Heat 1 ====
Rank	Athlete	Nation	Time	Notes
1	Joseph Chesire	Kenya	3:38.51	Q
2	Omer Khalifa	Sudan	3:38.93	Q
3	Stefano Mei	Italy	3:39.25	Q
4	Tony Rogers	New Zealand	3:39.78	q
5	José Luis González	Spain	3:47.01	
6	Faouzi Lahbi	Morocco	3:47.54	
7	Paul Ceesay	The Gambia	3:59.14	
8	Amor Masoud Al-Sharji	Oman	4:12.76	
—	Antti Loikkanen	Finland	DNF	
—	Charlie Oliver	Solomon Islands	DNS	

==== Heat 2 ====
Rank	Athlete	Nation	Time	Notes
1	Pascal Thiébaut	France	3:45.18	Q
2	Sebastian Coe	Great Britain	3:45.30	Q
3	Andrés Vera	Spain	3:45.44	Q
4	Paul Donovan	Ireland	3:45.70	
5	Jama Mohamed Aden	Somalia	3:46.80	
6	Mohamed Alouini	Tunisia	3:49.78	
7	Dale Jones	Antigua and Barbuda	3:55.65	
8	Kgomotso Balotthanyi	Botswana	3:58.69	
—	Oslen Barr	Guyana	DNF	
—	Abdul Al-Ghadi	North Yemen	DNS	
—	Sydney Maree	United States	DNS	

==== Heat 3 ====
Rank	Athlete	Nation	Time	Notes
1	Steve Ovett	Great Britain	3:49.23	Q
2	Agberto Guimarães	Brazil	3:49.26	Q
3	Marcus O'Sullivan	Ireland	3:49.65	Q
4	Josephat Muraya	Kenya	3:51.61	
5	Gawain Guy	Jamaica	3:52.04	
6	Claudio Patrignani	Italy	3:52.63	
7	Mehdi Aidet	Algeria	3:53.92	
8	Mouteb Al-Faouri	Jordan	3:59.85	
—	Pierre Délèze	Switzerland	DNF	
—	Francisco Figueredo	Paraguay	DNS	
—	William Wuycke	Venezuela	DNS	

==== Heat 4 ====
Rank	Athlete	Nation	Time	Notes
1	Joaquim Cruz	Brazil	3:41.01	Q
2	Steve Scott	United States	3:41.02	Q
3	Michael Hillardt	Australia	3:41.18	Q
4	Frank O'Mara	Ireland	3:41.76	
5	Alex Gonzalez	France	3:42.84	
6	Mark Handelsman	Israel	3:45.05	
7	Abderrahmane Morceli	Algeria	3:45.09	
8	Archfell Musango	Zambia	3:46.99	
9	Adamou Allassane	Niger	3:56.43	
10	Tito Rodrigues	Suriname	4:02.87	
—	Dragan Zdravković	Yugoslavia	DNS	

==== Heat 5 ====
Rank	Athlete	Nation	Time	Notes
1	José Manuel Abascal	Spain	3:37.68	Q
2	Peter Wirz	Switzerland	3:37.75	Q
3	Uwe Becker	West Germany	3:37.76	Q
4	Riccardo Materazzi	Italy	3:37.95	q
5	Pat Scammell	Australia	3:39.18	q
6	James Igohe	Tanzania	3:39.62	q
7	Tapfumaneyi Jonga	Zimbabwe	3:40.42	q
8	Isaac Ganunga	Malawi	3:53.86	
9	Hugo Allan García	Guatemala	3:57.59	
10	Kim Bok-Joo	South Korea	4:02.63	
—	Ibrahim Aziz	United Arab Emirates	DNF	

==== Heat 6 ====
Rank	Athlete	Nation	Time	Notes
1	Steve Cram	Great Britain	3:40.33	Q
2	Jim Spivey	United States	3:40.58	Q
3	Peter O'Donoghue	New Zealand	3:40.69	Q
4	Abdi Bile	Somalia	3:40.72	q
5	Kipkoech Cheruiyot	Kenya	3:41.96	
6	Zakaria Namonge	Tanzania	3:45.55	
7	Batulamai Rajakumar	Malaysia	3:55.19	
8	Jean-Marie Rudasingwa	Rwanda	3:57.62	
9	Philip Sinon	Seychelles	4:25.80	
10	Diosdado Lozano	Equatorial Guinea	4:34.71	
—	Omar Ortega	Argentina	DNF	

=== Semifinals ===
==== Semifinal 1 ====
Rank	Athlete	Nation	Time	Notes
1	José Manuel Abascal	Spain	3:35.70	Q
2	Steve Scott	United States	3:35.71	Q
3	Sebastian Coe	Great Britain	3:35.81	Q
4	Joseph Chesire	Kenya	3:35.83	Q
4	Peter Wirz	Switzerland	3:35.83	Q
6	Tony Rogers	New Zealand	3:36.48	q
7	Riccardo Materazzi	Italy	3:36.51	q
8	Michael Hillardt	Australia	3:38.12	
9	Pascal Thiébaut	France	3:40.96	
10	James Igohe	Tanzania	3:41.57	
—	Abdi Bile	Somalia	DSQ	
—	Agberto Guimarães	Brazil	DSQ	

==== Semifinal 2 ====
Rank	Athlete	Nation	Time	Notes
1	Steve Cram	Great Britain	3:36.30	Q
2	Jim Spivey	United States	3:36.53	Q
3	Andrés Vera	Spain	3:36.55	Q
3	Steve Ovett	Great Britain	3:36.55	Q
5	Omar Khalifa	Sudan	3:36.76	q
6	Uwe Becker	West Germany	3:37.28	
7	Stefano Mei	Italy	3:37.96	
8	Peter O'Donoghue	New Zealand	3:38.71	
9	Marcus O'Sullivan	Ireland	3:39.40	
10	Pat Scammell	Australia	3:40.83	
11	Tapfumaneyi Jonga	Zimbabwe	3:41.80	
—	Joaquim Cruz	Brazil	DNS	

=== Final ===
Rank	Athlete	Nation	Time	Notes
1st place, gold medalist(s)	Sebastian Coe	Great Britain	3:32.53	OR
2nd place, silver medalist(s)	Steve Cram	Great Britain	3:33.40	
3rd place, bronze medalist(s)	José Manuel Abascal	Spain	3:34.30	
4	Joseph Chesire	Kenya	3:34.52	
5	Jim Spivey	United States	3:36.07	
6	Peter Wirz	Switzerland	3:36.97	
7	Andrés Vera	Spain	3:37.02	
8	Omar Khalifa	Sudan	3:37.11	
9	Tony Rogers	New Zealand	3:38.98	
10	Steve Scott	United States	3:39.86	
11	Riccardo Materazzi	Italy	3:40.74	
—	Steve Ovett	Great Britain	DNF	

== See also ==
- 1982 Men's European Championships 1500 metres (Athens)
- 1983 Men's World Championships 1500 metres (Helsinki)
- 1984 Men's Friendship Games 1500 metres (Moscow)
- 1986 Men's European Championships 1500 metres (Stuttgart)
- 1987 Men's World Championships 1500 metres (Rome)
