= 1981 European Athletics Indoor Championships – Men's 1500 metres =

The men's 1500 metres event at the 1981 European Athletics Indoor Championships was held on 22 February.

== Results ==
Rank	Name	Nationality	Time	Notes
1st place, gold medalist(s)	Thomas Wessinghage	West Germany	3:42.64	
2nd place, silver medalist(s)	Uwe Becker	West Germany	3:43.02	
3rd place, bronze medalist(s)	Mirosław Żerkowski	Poland	3:44.32	
4	Peter Belger	West Germany	3:44.89	
5	José Manuel Abascal	Spain	3:45.08	
6	László Tóth	Hungary	3:45.34	
7	Marc Nevens	Belgium	3:45.67	
8	Gianni Truschi	Italy	3:48.22	
9	José Cudeiro	Spain	3:49.88	
