= Athletics at the 1975 Summer Universiade – Men's 1500 metres =

The men's 1500 metres event at the 1975 Summer Universiade was held at the Stadio Olimpico in Rome on 18 and 20 September.

== Medalists ==
| Gold | Silver | Bronze |
|---|---|---|
| Thomas Wessinghage; West Germany | Steve Heidenreich; United States | Gheorghe Ghipu; Romania |

== Results ==
=== Heats ===
| Rank | Heat | Athlete | Nationality | Time | Notes |
|---|---|---|---|---|---|
| 1 | 1 | Thomas Wessinghage | West Germany | 3:45.82 | Q |
| 2 | 1 | Javier Chávez | Mexico | 3:46.16 | Q |
| 3 | 1 | Peter Spir | Canada | 3:46.29 | Q |
| 4 | 1 | Luigi Zarcone | Italy | 3:46.31 | Q |
| 5 | 1 | Štefan Polák | Czechoslovakia | 3:46.3? | Q |
| 6 | 1 | Dominique Tellier | France | 3:46.36 | Q |
| 7 | 1 | Liévin De Reymaecker | Belgium | 3:46.55 | q |
| 8 | 1 | Henryk Wasilewski | Poland | 3:46.68 | |
| 9 | 1 | Francisco Gordillo | Spain | 3:47.24 | |
| 10 | 1 | Yevgeniy Volkov | Soviet Union | 3:47.50 | |
| 11 | 2 | Gheorghe Ghipu | Romania | 3:48.36 | Q |
| 12 | 2 | David Moorcroft | Great Britain | 3:48.47 | Q |
| 13 | 2 | Steve Heidenreich | United States | 3:48.52 | Q |
| 14 | 2 | Giulio Riga | Italy | 3:48.57 | Q |
| 15 | 2 | Jost Wollstein | West Germany | 3:48.75 | Q |
| 16 | 2 | Wiesław Watras | Poland | 3:49.17 | |
| 17 | 2 | Aleksandr Andrusenko | Soviet Union | 3:49.30 | |
| 18 | 2 | Francisco Méndez | Mexico | 3:50.01 | |
| 19 | 1 | Vicente Pimentel Silva | Brazil | 3:50.07 | |
| 20 | 2 | Spyros Nakos | Greece | 3:50.54 | |
| 21 | 2 | Francisco Recuero | Spain | 3:51.85 | |
| 22 | 1 | Walter Fähndrich | Switzerland | 3:52.62 | |
| 23 | 2 | Christian Benezis | France | 3:52.81 | |
| 24 | 1 | Mohamed Reza Hasan Gaviar | Iran | 3:57.86 | |
| 25 | 2 | Lafta Askar Sabri | Kuwait | 4:13.47 | |

=== Final ===
| Rank | Athlete | Nationality | Time | Notes |
|---|---|---|---|---|
| 1st place, gold medalist(s) | Thomas Wessinghage | West Germany | 3:39.73 | |
| 2nd place, silver medalist(s) | Steve Heidenreich | United States | 3:40.56 | |
| 3rd place, bronze medalist(s) | Gheorghe Ghipu | Romania | 3:41.19 | |
| 4 | David Moorcroft | Great Britain | 3:42.58 | |
| 5 | Giulio Riga | Italy | 3:42.68 | |
| 6 | Jost Wollstein | West Germany | 3:43.27 | |
| 7 | Javier Chávez | Mexico | 3:43.30 | |
| 8 | Štefan Polák | Czechoslovakia | 3:43.45 | |
| 9 | Dominique Tellier | France | 3:43.98 | |
| 10 | Luigi Zarcone | Italy | 3:47.96 | |
| 11 | Liévin De Reymaecker | Belgium | 3:48.23 | |
| 12 | Peter Spir | Canada | 3:50.92 | |
