= Nikolay Kirov =

Nikolay Kirov may refer to:

- Nikolay Kirov (athlete)
- Nikolay Kirov (footballer)
