= Frank Clement =

Frank Clement may refer to:

- Frank G. Clement (1920–1969), American politician from Tennessee
- Frank Clement (racing driver) (1886–1970), British racing driver
- Frank Clement (athlete) (born 1952), Scottish athlete

== See also ==
- Francis Clement Kelly, bishop of Oklahoma
