= 1977 European Athletics Indoor Championships – Men's 1500 metres =

The men's 1500 metres event at the 1977 European Athletics Indoor Championships was held on 12 and 13 March in San Sebastián.

== Medalists ==
Gold	Silver	Bronze
Jürgen Straub; East Germany	Paul-Heinz Wellmann; West Germany	János Zemen; Hungary

== Results ==
=== Heats ===
First 3 from each heat (Q) and the next 2 fastest (q) qualified for the final.

Rank	Heat	Name	Nationality	Time	Notes
1	1	Henryk Wasilewski	Poland	3:42.5	Q
2	1	Paul-Heinz Wellmann	West Germany	3:42.5	Q
3	1	Jürgen Straub	East Germany	3:42.6	Q
4	1	Anatoliy Mamontov	Soviet Union	3:42.7	q
5	2	János Zemen	Hungary	3:43.3	Q
6	2	Vladimir Kanev	Bulgaria	3:43.3	Q
7	2	Francis Gonzalez	France	3:43.4	Q
8	2	Eamonn Coghlan	Ireland	3:43.5	q
9	1	Herman Mignon	Belgium	3:43.5	
10	2	Wybo Lelieveld	Netherlands	3:44.1	
11	2	Tamás Szántó	Hungary	3:45.1	
12	1	Panayiotis Pallikaris	Greece	3:45.4	
13	1	Rudi Pagel	West Germany	3:45.5	
14	2	Peter Belger	West Germany	3:45.6	
15	2	Jozef Lenčéš	Czechoslovakia	3:46.2	
16	1	Evert Hoving	Netherlands	3:46.2	
17	1	János Hrenek	Hungary	3:48.3	

=== Final ===
Rank	Name	Nationality	Time	Notes
1st place, gold medalist(s)	Jürgen Straub	East Germany	3:46.5	
2nd place, silver medalist(s)	Paul-Heinz Wellmann	West Germany	3:46.6	
3rd place, bronze medalist(s)	János Zemen	Hungary	3:46.6	
4	Anatoliy Mamontov	Soviet Union	3:46.9	
5	Henryk Wasilewski	Poland	3:47.6	
6	Vladimir Kanev	Bulgaria	3:48.6	
7	Francis Gonzalez	France	3:49.2	
8	Eamonn Coghlan	Ireland	3:53.5	
