= Jürgen Straub =

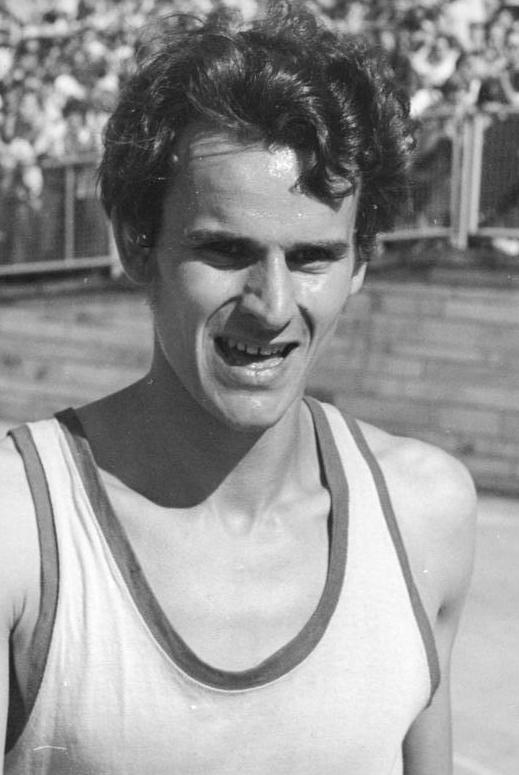

Medal record

Men's athletics

Representing East Germany

Olympic Games
Silver medal – second place	1980 Moscow	1500 m

European Indoor Championships
Gold medal – first place	1977 San Sebastián	1500 m
Bronze medal – third place	1978 Milan	1500 m

IAAF World Cup
Bronze medal – third place	1977 Düsseldorf	1500 m
Bronze medal – third place	1979 Montreal	1500 m

Jürgen Straub (born November 3, 1953, in Weitersroda) is a former East German middle-distance runner who specialized in the 1500 metres.

Straub's greatest race won him a silver medal at the 1980 Summer Olympics over 1500 metres representing East Germany, behind Sebastian Coe. In that race Straub surprisingly beat 800 metres champion Steve Ovett into third place. Needing a strategy to compete against the two more favoured and fast-finishing British runners, Straub suddenly accelerated with still 700 meters of the race remaining and then steadily increased his pace to the end, overhauled only by Coe and crossing the finishing line in obvious delight. British athletics coach George Gandy later said "If anyone deserved a gold medal, it was Straub". Straub also finished third at the 1977 and 1979 IAAF World Cups.

Straub set his personal best over 1500 m in Potsdam in 1979 with a time of 3:33.68 min. This result places him sixth on the German all-time performers list, behind Thomas Wessinghage, Harald Hudak, Jens-Peter Herold, Dieter Baumann and Rüdiger Stenzel.

Straub was an excellent 3000 m steeplechaser as well, winning three East German national titles over that distance. He competed for the sports club ASK Vorwärts Potsdam during his active career.
