= Athletics at the 1973 Summer Universiade – Men's 1500 metres =

The men's 1500 metres event at the 1973 Summer Universiade was held at the Central Lenin Stadium in Moscow on 19 and 20 August.

== Medalists ==
Gold	Silver	Bronze
Frank Clement; Great Britain	Tony Waldrop; United States	Reggie McAfee; United States

== Results ==
=== Heats ===
Rank	Heat	Athlete	Nationality	Time	Notes
1	1	Philip Banning	Great Britain	3:48.9	Q
2	1	Vladimir Panteley	Soviet Union	3:49.1	Q
3	1	Jürgen Roters	West Germany	3:49.3	Q
4	1	Giulio Riga	Italy	3:49.5	
5	1	Jan Sychra	Czechoslovakia	3:50.5	
6	1	José Bordón	Cuba	3:51.5	
7	1	Liévin De Reymaecker	Belgium	3:52.5	
8	1	Jaime Valencia	Chile	4:00.6	
9	1	Benjamin Abati	Ghana	4:07.1	
1	2	Mikhail Ulymov	Soviet Union	3:44.31	Q
2	2	Tony Waldrop	United States	3:44.9	Q
3	2	John Hartnett	Ireland	3:45.6	Q
4	2	Kamel Guemar	Algeria	3:48.0	
5	2	Francisco Méndez	Mexico	3:51.1	
6	2	Jean Kaiser	Luxembourg	3:51.66	
7	2	Piet Bouquillon	Belgium	3:51.9	
8	2	Resan Khrabit	Iraq	4:00.6	
9	2	Marc Ounezoui	Central African Republic	4:21.1	
1	3	Frank Clement	Great Britain	3:43.5	Q
2	3	Reggie McAfee	United States	3:44.1	Q
3	3	Thomas Wessinghage	West Germany	3:44.6	Q
4	3	Azzedine Azzouzi	Algeria	3:44.6	q
5	3	Ivan Kováč	Czechoslovakia	3:44.9	q
6	3	Francesco Dal Corso	Italy	3:45.2	q
7	3	José Cobo	Cuba	3:45.4	
8	3	Mohammad Vodjdanzadeh	Iran	3:57.7	
9	3	Alfredo Palomares	Mexico	4:00.0	
10	3	Lafta Askar Sabri	Kuwait	4:11.9	
11	3	Clovis Morales	Honduras	4:17.6	

=== Final ===
Rank	Athlete	Nationality	Time	Notes
1st place, gold medalist(s)	Frank Clement	Great Britain	3:42.32	UR
2nd place, silver medalist(s)	Tony Waldrop	United States	3:42.69	
3rd place, bronze medalist(s)	Reggie McAfee	United States	3:43.24	
4	Philip Banning	Great Britain	3:43.9	
5	Vladimir Panteley	Soviet Union	3:43.99	
6	John Hartnett	Ireland	3:44.6	
7	Jürgen Roters	West Germany	3:44.95	
8	Mikhail Ulymov	Soviet Union	3:45.00	
9	Azzedine Azzouzi	Algeria	3:45.4	
10	Ivan Kováč	Czechoslovakia	3:45.4	
11	Francesco Dal Corso	Italy	3:45.8	
	Thomas Wessinghage	West Germany	DNF	
