= 1976 European Athletics Indoor Championships – Men's 1500 metres =

The men's 1500 metres event at the 1976 European Athletics Indoor Championships was held on 21 and 22 February in Munich.

== Medalists ==
Gold	Silver	Bronze
Paul-Heinz Wellmann; West Germany	Thomas Wessinghage; West Germany	Gheorghe Ghipu; Romania

== Results ==
=== Heats ===
First 4 from each heat (Q) qualified directly for the final.

Rank	Heat	Name	Nationality	Time	Notes
1	1	Thomas Wessinghage	West Germany	3:44.9	Q
2	1	Gheorghe Ghipu	Romania	3:45.1	Q
3	1	Anatoliy Mamontov	Soviet Union	3:45.7	Q
4	1	Herman Mignon	Belgium	3:45.8	Q
5	1	Vladimir Kanev	Bulgaria	3:46.1	
6	1	Eugeniusz Frąckowiak	Poland	3:46.3	
7	2	Paul-Heinz Wellmann	West Germany	3:48.3	Q
8	2	Eberhard Helm	West Germany	3:48.7	Q
9	2	Glen Grant	Great Britain	3:48.9	Q
10	2	Daniel Jańczuk	Poland	3:49.1	Q
11	2	Åke Svensson	Sweden	3:49.8	
12	2	Fotios Kourtis	Greece	3:49.9	

=== Final ===
Rank	Name	Nationality	Time	Notes
1st place, gold medalist(s)	Paul-Heinz Wellmann	West Germany	3:45.1	
2nd place, silver medalist(s)	Thomas Wessinghage	West Germany	3:45.3	
3rd place, bronze medalist(s)	Gheorghe Ghipu	Romania	3:46.1	
4	Herman Mignon	Belgium	3:47.1	
5	Eberhard Helm	West Germany	3:47.3	
6	Daniel Jańczuk	Poland	3:47.7	
7	Anatoliy Mamontov	Soviet Union	3:47.7	
8	Glen Grant	Great Britain	3:48.4	
