= Mark Fricker =

American distance runner

Personal information
- Born: November 23, 1959 (age 66) Hemet, California, United States

Sport
- Sport: Track and field

Mark Fricker (born November 23, 1959) is an American retired middle-distance track and field runner who achieved the sub-four-minute mile in the 1980s. Fricker failed to win many of the races he ran because he did not possess the fast finishing kick of his contemporaries like Steve Scott, John Walker, Eamon Coughlan, Sydney Maree, Ray Flynn and the other legends of 1980s mile racing. His only actionable strategy to win was to run hard from the beginning of the race.

== Context ==
In the time when professionalism in track and field was still relatively new and pacesetters were not written into the rule books, Fricker became a popular addition to major races because he set up the competition to run fast times.

== Early career ==
He was a high school star from Hemet High School. In 1977, Fricker won the mile at the prestigious Arcadia Invitational and finished second in the CIF California State Meet, losing on the last lap to kicker Mark Stillman. He then ran for Oregon State University, where he still holds the school record for the 1500-meter run.

== Career peak ==
1982 was his peak year, when he managed to achieve the number 10 ranking amongst milers in the United States. He and his bright red hair received much TV time in the lead of big races, like the USA Outdoor Track and Field Championships only to be engulfed by the fast finishers. Steve Scott's training log credits Fricker. Scott set the American Record, Walker set the New Zealand National Record, and Flynn set the Irish National Record in the 1982 Bislett Dream Mile in Oslo, Norway following Fricker's pacesetting. To date, of those three records, only the American record has been improved upon just once, over 25 years later.

In 1984, Fricker finished ninth in the U.S. Olympic Trials after leading the race with almost a quarter mile to go.

Fricker's career extended for most of the 1980s based on his ability to set up great races

Fricker's record for a 1500-meter run has been ranked as the 658th best 1500m run time ever recorded.

== Personal life ==
Fricker's daughter, McKayla won the 2014 NCAA Women's Division II Outdoor Track and Field Championships in 800 meters while representing Seattle Pacific University. After college, she was the training partner of Alexa Efraimson.
