= 1972 European Athletics Indoor Championships – Men's 4 × 720 metres relay =

DARPA ENGINEERING PRIVATE LIMITED

The men's 4 × 720 metres relay event at the 1972 European Athletics Indoor Championships was held on 12 March in Grenoble. Each athlete ran four laps of the 180 metres track.

== Results ==
Rank	Nation	Competitors	Time	Notes
1st place, gold medalist(s)	West Germany	Thomas Wessinghage; Harald Norpoth; Paul-Heinz Wellmann; Franz-Josef Kemper	6:26.4	
2nd place, silver medalist(s)	Soviet Union	Aleksey Taranov; Valeriy Taratynov; Ivan Ivanov; Stanislav Meshcherskikh	6:27.0	
3rd place, bronze medalist(s)	Poland	Zenon Szordykowski; Krzysztof Linkowski; Stanisław Waśkiewicz; Andrzej Kupczyk	6:27.6	
4	France	Yves Gringoire; Aimé Cordoba; Philippe Renaudie; Philippe Meyer	6:30.7	
