= Mirosław Żerkowski =

Polish sportsperson and athletics competitor

Personal information
- Born: 20 August 1956 (age 69) Łódź, Poland
- Height: 1.76 m (5 ft 9 in)
- Weight: 60 kg (132 lb)

Sport
- Sport: Athletics
- Events: 1500 m, 3000 m steeplechase
- Club: MKS-AZS Łódź (1973–1977); AZS Poznań (1978–1979); ŁKS Łódź (1980); ROW Rybnik (1981–1992); Budowlani Kielce (1993)
- Coached by: Janusz Ludka
Medal record
Men's athletics
Representing Poland
European Indoor Championships
Bronze medal – third place	1981 Grenoble	1500 metres

Mirosław Żerkowski (born 20 August 1956 in Łódź) is a retired Polish middle- and long-distance runner. He represented his country at the 1980 Summer Olympics as well as one outdoor and one indoor World Championships. In addition, he won a bronze medal at the 1981 European Indoor Championships.

== International competitions ==
Year	Competition	Venue	Position	Event	Notes
Representing Poland
1980	Olympic Games	Moscow, Soviet Union	18th (sf)	1500 m	3:48.2
1981	Pacific Conference Games	Christchurch, New Zealand	3rd	1500 m	3:42.15
1981	European Indoor Championships	Grenoble, France	3rd	1500 m	3:44.32
1982	European Indoor Championships	Milan, Italy	10th (h)	1500 m	3:44.08
1982	European Championships	Athens, Greece	19th (h)	1500 m	3:43.46
1984	European Indoor Championships	Gothenburg, Sweden	16th (h)	1500 m	3:49.11
1985	World Indoor Games	Paris, France	4th	1500 m	3:42.21
1985	European Indoor Championships	Piraeus, Greece	13th (h)	1500 m	3:43.63
1987	World Championships	Rome, Italy	–	3000 m s'chase	DNF
1990	European Championships	Split, Yugoslavia	–	3000 m s'chase	DNF
1993	World Half Marathon Championships	Brussels, Belgium	80th	Half marathon	1:05:00

== Personal bests ==
Outdoor

- 800 metres – 1:48.01 (Auckland 1981)
- 1000 metres – 2:19.30 (Białystok 1981)
- 1500 metres – 3:36.19 (Warsaw 1980)
- One mile – 3:56.63 (London 1982)
- 3000 metres – 7:48.93 (Rhede 1990)
- 5000 metres – 13:34.24 (Saarijärvi 1989)
- 10,000 metres – 28:45.35 (Białystok 1993)
- Half marathon – 1:05:00 (Brussels 1993)
- Marathon – 2:18.24 (New York 1996)
- 2000 metres steeplechase – 5:22.32 (Formia 1991)
- 3000 metres steeplechase – 8:16.89 (Berlin 1990)

Indoor

- 800 metres – 1:48.87 (Budapest 1984)
- 1500 metres – 3:41.16 (Stuttgart 1985)
