= Lucien Josiah =

Botswana sprinter

Personal information
- Nationality: Botswana
- Born: 16 July 1958 (age 67)

Sport
- Sport: Sprinting
- Events: 100 metres 200 metres

Lucien Josiah (born 16 July 1958) is a Botswana sprinter. He competed in the men's 100 metres and men's 200 metres at the 1980 Summer Olympics.
