= Carlos Cabral (athlete) =

Portuguese former athlete

Personal information
- Born: 20 June 1952 (age 73) Lagos, Portugal
- Height: 1.77 m (5 ft 10 in)
- Weight: 62 kg (137 lb)

Sport
- Sport: Athletics
- Event(s): 800 m, 1500 m
- Club: Esperança de Lagos; Sporting CP

Carlos Alberto Veiga Cabral (born 20 June 1952 in Lagos, Portugal) is a Portuguese former athlete who competed in middle-distance and cross country events. He won a silver medal in the 800 metres at the 1983 Ibero-American Championships. In addition, he represented his country at one outdoor and five indoor European Championships.

== International competitions ==
Year	Competition	Venue	Position	Event	Notes
Representing Portugal
1970	European Junior Championships	Colombes, France	13th (sf)	800 m	1:55.2
1979	European Indoor Championships	Vienna, Austria	10th (h)	800 m	1:51.0
1980	European Indoor Championships	Sindelfingen, West Germany	5th	1500 m	3:39.9
1982	European Indoor Championships	Milan, Italy	6th	1500 m	3:41.24
1982	European Championships	Athens, Greece	21st (h)	800 m	1:49.84
1982	European Championships	Athens, Greece	12th (h)	1500 m	3:42.29
1983	European Indoor Championships	Budapest, Hungary	10th (h)	1500 m	3:48.52
1983	Ibero-American Championships	Barcelona, Spain	2nd	800 m	1:49.32
1983	Ibero-American Championships	Barcelona, Spain	4th	1500 m	3:15.74
1985	European Indoor Championships	Piraeus, Greece	12th (h)	1500 m	3:42.20

== Personal bests ==
Outdoor

- 800 metres – 1:47.33 (Berlin 1980)
- 1000 metres – 2:19.9 (Acoteias 1982)
- 1500 metres – 3:38.7 (Lisbon 1980)
- 2000 metres – 5:06.4 (Lisbon 1984)

Indoor

- 800 metres – 1:51.0 (Vienna 1979)
- 1500 metres – 3:39.9 (Sindelfingen 1980)
