= Jean-Marie Rudasingwa =

Rwandan middle-distance runner

Personal information
- Nationality: Rwandan
- Born: 31 December 1960 Gisenyi, Rwanda
- Died: 8 April 1994 (aged 33)
- Height: 175 cm (5 ft 9 in)
- Weight: 68 kg (150 lb)

Sport
- Country: Rwanda
- Sport: Middle-distance running

Jean-Marie Vianney Rudasingwa (31 December 1960 – 8 April 1994) was a Rwandan Olympic middle-distance runner. He represented his country in the men's 1500 meters and the men's 800 meters at the 1984 Summer Olympics. His time was a 3:57.62 in the 1500, and a 1:53.23 in the 800 heats.
