= Ishmael Mhaladi =

Motswana Olympic middle-distance runner (born 1948)

Personal information
- Nationality: Mosotho
- Born: 21 January 1948 (age 78) Botswana
- Height: 177 cm (5 ft 10 in)
- Weight: 70 kg (154 lb)

Sport
- Country: Botswana
- Sport: Middle-distance running

Ishmael Mhaladi is a Motswana Olympic middle-distance runner. He represented his country in the men's 1500 meters at the 1980 Summer Olympics. His time was a 3:59.04.
