= Josephat Muraya =

Kenyan middle-distance runner

Josephat Mūraya
Personal information
- Nationality: Kenyan
- Born: 25 December 1957 (age 68) Kenya

Sport
- Country: Kenya
- Sport: Middle-distance running

Josephat Mūraya is a Kenyan Olympic middle-distance runner. He represented his country in the men's 1500 meters at the 1984 Summer Olympics. His time was a 3:51.61 in the first heat.
