= Vicente Santos =

Mozambican Olympic runner

Personal information
- Nationality: Mozambican
- Born: Mozambique

Sport
- Country: Mozambique
- Sport: Middle-distance running

Vicente Santos is a Mozambican Olympic middle-distance runner. He represented his country in the men's 1500 meters at the 1980 Summer Olympics. His time was a 3:58.67.
