= Dave Hill (runner) =

Canadian middle-distance runner

Personal information
- Born: 26 December 1952 (age 72) Trois-Rivières, Quebec, Canada

Sport
- Sport: Middle-distance running
- Event: 1500 metres

Dave Hill (born 26 December 1952) is a Canadian middle-distance runner. He competed in the men's 1500 metres at the 1976 Summer Olympics.
