= Zakaria Namonge =

Tanzanian middle-distance runner

Personal information
- Born: 1964 (age 61–62) Tanzania

Sport
- Country: Tanzania
- Sport: Middle-distance running

Zakaria Gwandu Namonge is a Tanzanian Olympic middle-distance runner. He represented his country in the men's 1500 meters at the 1984 Summer Olympics. His time was a 3:45.55 in the first heat.
