= Paul Ceesay =

Gambian middle-distance runner

Personal information
- Nationality: Gambian
- Born: 18 February 1959 (age 67) The Gambia
- Height: 185 cm (6 ft 1 in)
- Weight: 70 kg (154 lb)

Sport
- Country: The Gambia
- Sport: Middle-distance running

Paul Ceesay is a Gambian Olympic middle-distance runner. He represented his country in the men's 1500 meters at the 1984 Summer Olympics.

Ceesay attended Saint Augustine's High School in Banjul, Gambia. He is the twin brother of fellow athlete Peter Ceesay, and both brothers were honored at an alumni event in 2016.

Ceesay was called one of the great track stars of the Gambia. At the 1984 Olympics, Ceesay ran 3:59.14 to finish 7th in his 1500 m heat, failing to advance to the semi-finals.

After the Olympics, Ceesay stayed in Kansas City, Missouri and competed at local races. He served on the executive committee of the Ethnic Enrichment Association of Kansas City. In 2022, he participated in a Quindaro Township Site event to teach about Kansas City's role in the slave trade in the United States.
