= Andreas Baranski =

German middle-distance runner (born 1960)

Personal information
- Born: 10 March 1960 (age 66) Ludwigshafen am Rhein, West Germany
- Height: 1.80 m (5 ft 11 in)
- Weight: 66 kg (146 lb)

Sport
- Sport: Athletics
- Event: 1500 metres
- Club: LAV Rala Ludwigshafen (–1982); VfB Stuttgart (1982–)
Medal record
Representing West Germany
Summer Universiade
Silver medal – second place	1983 Edmonton	1500m

Andreas Baranski (born 10 March 1960) is a West German former middle-distance runner who specialised in the 1500 metres. He won a silver medal at the 1983 Summer Universiade. In addition, he competed at three European Indoor Championships, reaching the final twice.

== International competitions ==
Year	Competition	Venue	Position	Event	Notes
Representing West Germany
1979	European Junior Championships	Bydgoszcz, Poland	6th	1500 m	3:47.23
1982	European Indoor Championships	Milan, Italy	5th	1500 m	3:40.96
1983	European Indoor Championships	Budapest, Hungary	6th	1500 m	3:42.54
1983	Universiade	Edmonton, Canada	2nd	1500 m	3:41.21
1984	European Indoor Championships	Gothenburg, Sweden	13th (h)	1500 m	3:44.23

== Personal bests ==
Outdoor

- 800 metres – 1:47.33 (Durham 1982)
- 1000 metres – 2:17.72 (Cologne 1982)
- 1500 metres – 3:36.43 (Warsaw 1980)
- One mile – 3:58.40 (Berlin 1980)
- 3000 metres – 8:03.9 (Aalen 1981)

Indoor

- 1500 metres – 3:40.60 (Stuttgart 1985)
