= James Igohe =

Tanzanian middle-distance runner

Personal information
- Born: 1962 (age 63–64) Tanganyika (now in Tanzania)
- Height: 169 cm (5 ft 7 in)
- Weight: 64 kg (141 lb)

Sport
- Country: Tanzania
- Sport: Middle-distance running

James Igohe is a Tanzanian Olympic middle-distance runner. He represented his country in the men's 1500 meters at the 1984 Summer Olympics, recording times of 3:39.62 in the first heat and 3:41.57 in the semifinals.
