= Emmanuel Saint-Hilaire =

Haitian athlete

Personal information
- Nationality: Haitian
- Born: 5 December 1952 (age 73)

Sport
- Sport: Middle-distance running
- Event: 1500 metres

Emmanuel Saint-Hilaire (born 5 December 1952) is a Haitian middle-distance runner. He competed in the men's 1500 metres at the 1976 Summer Olympics.
