= Haile Zeru =

Ethiopian middle-distance runner

Personal information
- Nationality: Ethiopian
- Born: 7 January 1955 (age 71) Lesotho
- Height: 160 cm (5 ft 3 in)
- Weight: 51 kg (112 lb)

Sport
- Country: Ethiopia
- Sport: Middle-distance running

Haile Zeru is an Ethiopian Olympic middle-distance runner. He represented his country in the men's 1500 meters at the 1980 Summer Olympics. His time was a 3:45.68.
