= János Zemen =

Hungarian middle-distance runner

Personal information
- Nationality: Hungarian
- Born: 29 August 1950 (age 75) Vác
- Height: 173 cm (5 ft 8 in)
- Weight: 65 kg (143 lb)

Sport
- Country: Hungary
- Sport: Middle-distance running
Medal record
Men's athletics
Representing Hungary
European Indoor Championships
Bronze medal – third place	1977 San Sebastián	1500 m

János Zemen is a Hungarian Olympic middle-distance runner. He represented his country in the men's 1500 meters at the 1976 Summer Olympics. His time was a 3:44.27 in the first heat, a 3:39.94 in the semifinals, and a 3:43.02 in the finals. He also competed in the men's 800 metres, posting a time of 1:47.40 in the heats.
