= Paul Craig (runner) =

Canadian middle-distance runner

Personal information
- Born: 2 September 1953 (age 73) Toronto, Ontario, Canada

Sport
- Sport: Middle-distance running
- Event: 1500 metres

Paul Craig (born 2 September 1953) is a Canadian middle-distance runner.

Described as an "athlete with a promising future", Craig reached the final at the 1978 Commonwealth Games.

== Early life ==
Craig and his twin brother, John, are both alumni of the University of Texas at Austin where Craig ran for the Texas Longhorns men's track and field team. He is married and resides with his family.

== Sporting career ==
At Don Mills Collegiate Institute, Craig was high school senior 1,600 metre champion. In 1971, he competed in an international high school track and field invitational, finishing second with a time of 4 minutes, 13.8 seconds, being beaten by Jim Morrison by only 1.3 seconds.

In December 1975, Craig ran in Gothenburg, Sweden, finishing with a time of 4:02, as he witnessed John Walker set the world record with a time of 3.49.4.

In July 1976, Craig was not picked for the Canadian team's European trip.

Craig competed in the men's 1,500 metres at the 1976 Summer Olympics. During the 1976 Olympics, he ran a time of 3:38.00 in his heat, which made him the Canadian record holder for the 1,500 meters.

In 1979, the twins spent time in California preparing for the 1980 Summer Olympics, however the Canadians later boycotted the event. During 1981, Craig began to suffer from a "mysterious illness" which doctors believed to be a virus. He suffered from a cough for five months after running a 5,000 metre track race in Knoxville, Tennessee, which affected his preparations for the 1984 Summer Olympics. In April 1981, Craig ran in the annual Brooks Shoes Spring Run-off and finished first with a time of 23 minutes 25 seconds, beating the prior year's time of 24 minutes by teammate Joe Sax. His brother John finished fourth.
