= Graham Williamson (athlete) =

British athlete

Personal information
- Nationality: British (Scottish)
- Born: 15 June 1960 (age 66) Glasgow, Scotland

Sport
- Sport: Athletics
- Event: middle-distance
- Club: Springburn Harriers
Medal record
Men's athletics
Representing Great Britain
Summer Universiade
Gold medal – first place	1979 Mexico City	1500 m
Silver medal – second place	1983 Edmonton	800 m

Graham Williamson (born 15 June 1960) is a retired Scottish athlete who competed mainly in the 1500 metres. He is the 1979 Universiade 1500m champion and represented Great Britain at the 1983 World Championships. His mile p.b of 3:50.64 set in 1982 was a Scottish record.

== Biography ==
Williamson was born in Glasgow and his running club was Springburn Harriers.

Williamson finished second behind Steve Ovett in the 1500 metres event at the 1979 AAA Championships and won the 1979 Summer Universiade 1500m title.

He finished second again at the AAA Championships in 1982, this time behind Steve Cram, before he finished fourth representing Scotland at the 1982 Commonwealth Games in Brisbane, Australia

He still holds the Scottish national records for the 1000 metres (2:16.82) and the 2000 metres (4:58.38), as well as multiple Scottish U20 records (800m/1500/Mile/3000m). He currently works for Adidas in Germany as Vice President of the tennis business unit and has a son who is also an athlete.

== International competitions ==
Year	Competition	Venue	Position	Event	Notes
Representing Great Britain / Scotland
1977	World Cross Country Championships (Junior race)	Düsseldorf, Germany	43rd	7.5 km	24:57
1979	World Cross Country Championships (Junior race)	Limerick, Ireland	23rd	7.4 km	23:48
1979	European Cup	Turin, Italy	3rd	1500 m	3:38.34
1979	Universiade	Mexico City, Mexico	1st	1500 m	3:45.37
1981	World Cross Country Championships	Madrid, Spain	DNF	12 km	—
1982	European Championships	Athens, Greece	DNF (fell)	1500 m	3:43.01 (heats)
1982	Commonwealth Games	Brisbane, Australia	4th	1500 m	3:43.84
1983	World Championships	Helsinki, Finland	23rd (sf)	1500 m	3:45.84
(sf) Indicates overall position in semifinals
