= Nikolay Kirov (athlete) =

Personal information
- Born: 22 November 1957 (age 68)
Medal record
Men's athletics
Representing the Soviet Union
Olympic Games
Bronze medal – third place	1980 Moscow	800 m
European Championships
Silver medal – second place	1982 Athens	1500 m

Nikolay Ivanovich Kirov (Belarusian: Мікалай Іванавіч Кіраў; Russian: Николай Иванович Киров; born 22 November 1957 in Streshin, Byelorussian SSR, Soviet Union) is a Soviet track and field runner who mainly competed in the men's 800 metres.

He competed for the Soviet Union at the 1980 Summer Olympics held in Moscow, Soviet Union where he won the bronze medal in the men's 800 metres event behind British duo Sebastian Coe and Steve Ovett. Kirov claimed the silver medal in the 1500 meters at the 1982 European Championships.
