= Tapfumaneyi Jonga =

Zimbabwean long-distance runner

Personal information
- Nationality: Zimbabwean
- Born: 13 November 1959 (age 66)

Sport
- Sport: Long-distance running
- Event: Marathon

Tapfumaneyi Jonga (born 13 November 1959) is a Zimbabwean long-distance runner. He competed in the marathon at the 1980 Summer Olympics.
