= Rick Wohlhuter =

American middle-distance runner

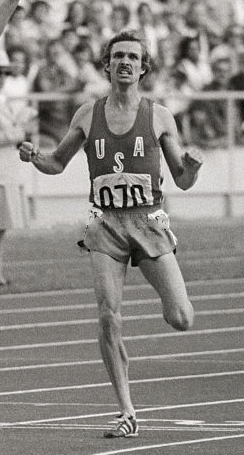
- Wohlhuter at the finish of the 800 m race at the 1976 Olympics

Personal information
- Born: December 23, 1948 (age 77) St. Charles, Illinois, U.S.
- Height: 1.75 m (5 ft 9 in)
- Weight: 60 kg (132 lb)

Sport
- Sport: Athletics
- Event: 400–1500 m
- Club: Chicago Track Club

Achievements and titles
- Personal bests: 440 yd – 48.5 (1970); 800 – 1:43.4y (1974); 1500 m – 3:36.4 (1975); Mile – 3:53.3 (1975)
Medal record
Representing the United States
Olympic Games
Bronze medal – third place	1976 Montreal	800 meters

Rick Wohlhuter (born December 23, 1948) is a retired American middle-distance runner.

Wohlhuter won the national indoor championship in the 600 yards in 1970. He graduated from the University of Notre Dame in 1971, and later qualified for the 1972 and 1976 Olympics. In 1976 he finished sixth in the 1500 meters. In the 800 metres, he was initially disqualified for bumping Seymour Newman in the semi-final, but reinstated on appeal and went on to win the bronze medal, behind Alberto Juantorena who broke the world record and Ivo Van Damme of Belgium.

Wohlhuter was the U.S. national champion for the 800 meters in 1973 and 1974 and was ranked #1 in the world both years by Track & Field News. Also in 1974, Wohlhuter won the first of three indoor 1000 yard U.S. national titles, set a world record in the 880 yards at 1:44.10 (1:43.5 at 800 meters), and a world record in the 1000 meter event at 2:13.9, which remains the longest standing American outdoor record. He won the James E. Sullivan Award as the nation's top amateur athlete for his achievements in 1974.

Wohlhuter retired in 1977. He contemplated a comeback in 1980, but reconsidered after learning about the American boycott of the Moscow Olympics. He began working in the insurance business instead.

Awards
Preceded by (Kenya) Ben Jipcho	Men's Track & Field Athlete of the Year; 1974	Succeeded by (New Zealand) John Walker
