= Uwe Becker =

German middle-distance runner (born 1955)

Personal information
- Born: 10 December 1955 (age 70) Rosche, West Germany
- Height: 1.88 m (6 ft 2 in)

Sport
- Sport: Athletics
- Events: 800 m, 1500 m
- Club: VfL Wolfsburg
Medal record
Men's athletics
Representing West Germany
European Indoor Championships
Silver medal – second place	1981 Grenoble	1500 m

Uwe Becker (born 10 December 1955 in Rosche) is a German former middle-distance runner who competed primarily in the 1500 metres. He won the silver medal at the 1981 European Indoor Championships. In addition, he represented West Germany at the 1984 Summer Olympics as well as two World Championships.

His brother Volker was also a middle distance runner.

Becker became West German champion in the 1500 metres in 1983, 1984 and 1985. He won silver medals in 1979, 1982, 1985 and 1986 as well as a bronze medal in 1980. He became indoor champion in the same event in 1980, 1981, 1983, 1984, 1985 and 1988 with one additional silver medal in 1986 – as well as one national silver medal in the 800 metres in 1978. He represented the club VfL Wolfsburg.

== International competitions ==
Year	Competition	Venue	Position	Event	Notes
Representing West Germany
1978	European Championships	Prague, Czechoslovakia	12th (sf)	800 m	1:48.2
1980	European Indoor Championships	Sindelfingen, West Germany	4th	1500 m	3:39.8
1981	European Indoor Championships	Grenoble, France	2nd	1500 m	3:43.02
1982	European Championships	Athens, Greece	6th	1500 m	3:38.17
1983	World Championships	Helsinki, Finland	11th	1500 m	3:45.09
1984	Olympic Games	Los Angeles, United States	13th (sf)	1500 m	3:37.28
1985	European Indoor Championships	Piraeus, Greece	6th (h)	1500 m	3:40.89^{1}
1987	World Championships	Rome, Italy	21st (h)	1500 m	3:43.73

^{1}Did not finish in the final

== Personal bests ==
Outdoor

- 800 metres – 1:45.9 (Cologne 1979)
- 1000 metres – 2:18.80 (Cologne 1983)
- 1500 metres – 3:34.84 (Koblenz 1983)
- One mile – 3:52.36 (Koblenz 1982)
- 3000 metres – 7:51.37 (Ingelheim 1983)

Indoor

- 1500 metres – 3:39.8 (Sindelfingen 1980)
