= John Robson (athlete) =

British male athlete

Personal information
- Nationality: British (Scottish)
- Born: 1 January 1957 (age 69) Kelso, Scotland

Sport
- Sport: Athletics
- Event: middle-distance
Medal record
Men's athletics
Representing Great Britain
European Indoor Championships
Bronze medal – third place	1979 Vienna	1500 m
Representing Scotland
Commonwealth Games
Bronze medal – third place	1978 Edmonton	1500 m

John Paton Robson (born 31 January 1957) in Kelso, Scotland is a retired British male athlete who competed in the 1500m. He has a personal best time of 3 minutes and 33.83 seconds.

== Biography ==
Robson competed for Scotland at the 1978 Commonwealth Games in Edmonton, Canada, winning a bronze medal. He also competed at the 1982 Commonwealth Games in Brisbane, Australia and the 1986 Commonwealth Games in Edinburgh, Scotland. Indoors he ran for Great Britain and won another bronze medal at the 1979 European Athletics Indoor Championships in Vienna, Austria. Robson also finished 8th at the 1978 European Athletics Championships in Prague (in former Czechoslovakia).

He also won the revered Emsley Carr Mile held at Crystal Palace London in 1978 and finished on the podium three times at the AAA Championships in 1977, 1979 and 1981.

Other personal best performances include: the mile 3 minutes 52.44 seconds, 800m 1 minute 47.8 seconds, 3000m 7 minutes 45.81 seconds, 5000m 13 minutes 34.02 seconds.

He was ranked 4th in the World on time in the 1500m event in 1978 and 1979 and finished 5th in the 1980 IAAF World Cross Country Championships in Longchamp, Paris.

Robson also held long standing Scottish national records for the 1500m from 1979 to 2017 and the 3000m from 1984 to 2016.
