= Vladimir Malozemlin =

Personal information
- Nationality: Soviet
- Born: 26 January 1956 (age 70) Novokuybyshevsk
- Height: 180 cm (5 ft 11 in)
- Weight: 60 kg (132 lb)

Sport
- Country: Soviet Union
- Sport: Middle-distance running

Vladimir Malozemlin is a Soviet Olympic middle-distance runner. He represented his country in the men's 1500 meters at the 1980 Summer Olympics. His time was a 3:38.68 in the first heat, and a 3:43.56 in the semifinals.
