= Ruben Sørensen =

Danish middle-distance runner

Personal information
- Nationality: Danish
- Born: 1 January 1954 (age 72) Randers
- Height: 194 cm (6 ft 4 in)
- Weight: 72 kg (159 lb)

Sport
- Country: Denmark
- Sport: Middle-distance running

Ruben Sørensen is a Danish Olympic middle-distance runner. He represented his country in the men's 1500 meters at the 1976 Summer Olympics. His time was a 3:45.39.
