= Åke Svenson =

Swedish middle-distance runner

Personal information
- Nationality: Swedish
- Born: 29 March 1953 (age 73) Uppsala
- Height: 185 cm (6 ft 1 in)
- Weight: 73 kg (161 lb)

Sport
- Country: Sweden
- Sport: Middle-distance running

Åke Svenson (born 29 March 1953) is a Swedish Olympic middle-distance runner. He represented his country in the men's 1500 meters at the 1976 Summer Olympics. His time was a 3:44.42 in the first heat. He also competed in the men's 800 metres, posting a 1:48.86 in the heats.
