= Tony Waldrop =

American college president (1951–2022)

Personal information
- Born: December 29, 1951 Columbus, North Carolina, U.S.
- Died: December 3, 2022 (aged 70) Chapel Hill, North Carolina, U.S.
- Education: University of North Carolina at Chapel Hill
- Occupations: university president, academic administrator, researcher
- Employers: University of South Alabama; University of Central Florida; University of North Carolina at Chapel Hill; University of Illinois at Urbana-Champaign

Sport
- Sport: Track & Field
- Retired: 1976
Medal record
Men's Athletics
Representing the United States
Pan American Games
Gold medal – first place	1975 Mexico City	1500 metres
Summer Universiade
Silver medal – second place	1973 Moscow	1500 metres

Tony Waldrop (December 29, 1951 – December 3, 2022) was an American academic administrator, researcher, and athlete. In 2014, he became the third president of the University of South Alabama.

== Early life ==
Waldrop was born in Columbus, North Carolina. In high school, he was the state champion in the half mile.

Waldrop attended the University of North Carolina at Chapel Hill (UNC) where he was a Morehead-Cain Scholar and served on the track team. He graduated in 1974 with a B.A. in political science as a Top Five NCAA Student Athlete.

In 1980, he received a MA in physical education from UNC, followed by a Ph.D. in cellular and molecular physiology in 1981. He received postdoctoral training at the Harry S. Moss Heart Center at the University of Texas Southwestern Medical Center.

== Track Career ==
When he was a freshman member of UNC's track team, he had never run more than seven miles in one session. Nevertheless, he followed the coaching staff's instruction to run ten miles in the morning and ten miles in the evening. After a week, his arches collapsed and he was on crutches.

Waldrop was a six-time Atlantic Coast Conference winner and six-time All-American while at the University of North Carolina. He set the world indoor record (3:55.0) in the mile in 1974. He won two NCAA championships: the indoor 1,000 yards in 1973 and the indoor mile in 1974.

Waldrop ran the mile in 3:53.2 for a win at the Penn Relays in 1974. He was on the cover ofTrack and Field News in both March and May 1974; the latter feature him at the Penn Relays. He also was the first man to break the 4-minute mile in the Wanamaker Mile at the Millrose Games in 1974. Also in 1974 he won the British AAA Championships title in the 1500 metres event at the 1974 AAA Championships.

In 1975, he became the assistant track coach at the University of North Carolina at Chapel Hill. That same year, he won the gold medal at the 1975 Pan American Games in Mexico City for the 1500 meters. He retired from track after the 1976 indoor season.

Waldrop said, "It was a really easy decision to decide to hang up the shoes and get on with the rest of my life. I never regretted the decision [to retire during the Olympic year], maybe there were one or two seconds of momentarily regret when I watched the 1500m at the Olympics... I accomplished a lot more in track than I ever imagined I would. There were a lot more things I wanted to do with my life…"

Waldrop went to the U.S. Olympic trials in 1972—he said the pressure was so great that it wasn't fun. As a result, making the Olympic team after college was "never an overwhelming goal."

== Academic career ==
From 1982 to 1986, Waldrop was a research fellow at the University of Texas Southwestern Medical Center. He was a recipient of the National Institutes of Health Postdoctoral Fellowship. While at Texas, he also taught respiration and physiology for medical and health science students.

Waldrop was a professor of molecular and integrative physiology at the University of Illinois at Urbana-Champaign, teaching undergraduate, graduate, and medical students. He was promoted to vice chancellor for research at Illinois.

Waldrop became vice chancellor for research and graduate studies at the University of North Carolina at Chapel Hill in 2001. There, he oversaw $577 million in research funding, annually.

In August 2010, he became provost and executive vice president at the University of Central Florida. In 2014, he became the third president of the University of South Alabama.

== Personal life and death ==
Waldrop married Julee Briscoe of Chapel Hill, the daughter of Vic Briscoe who was a University of North Carolina at Chapel Hill professor of physics. She also attended UNC and ran track. They have two sons, Cabe and Dallas.

On December 3, 2022, following a lengthy illness, Waldrop died at his home in Chapel Hill, North Carolina, at the age of 70.

== Awards and honors ==
- North Carolina Sports Hall of Fame
- ACC Athlete of the Year, 1974
- Patterson Medal, University of North Carolina at Chapel Hill

== External sources ==
- Track and Field Statistics for Tony Waldrop
