= Gheorghe Ghipu =

Romanian middle-distance runner

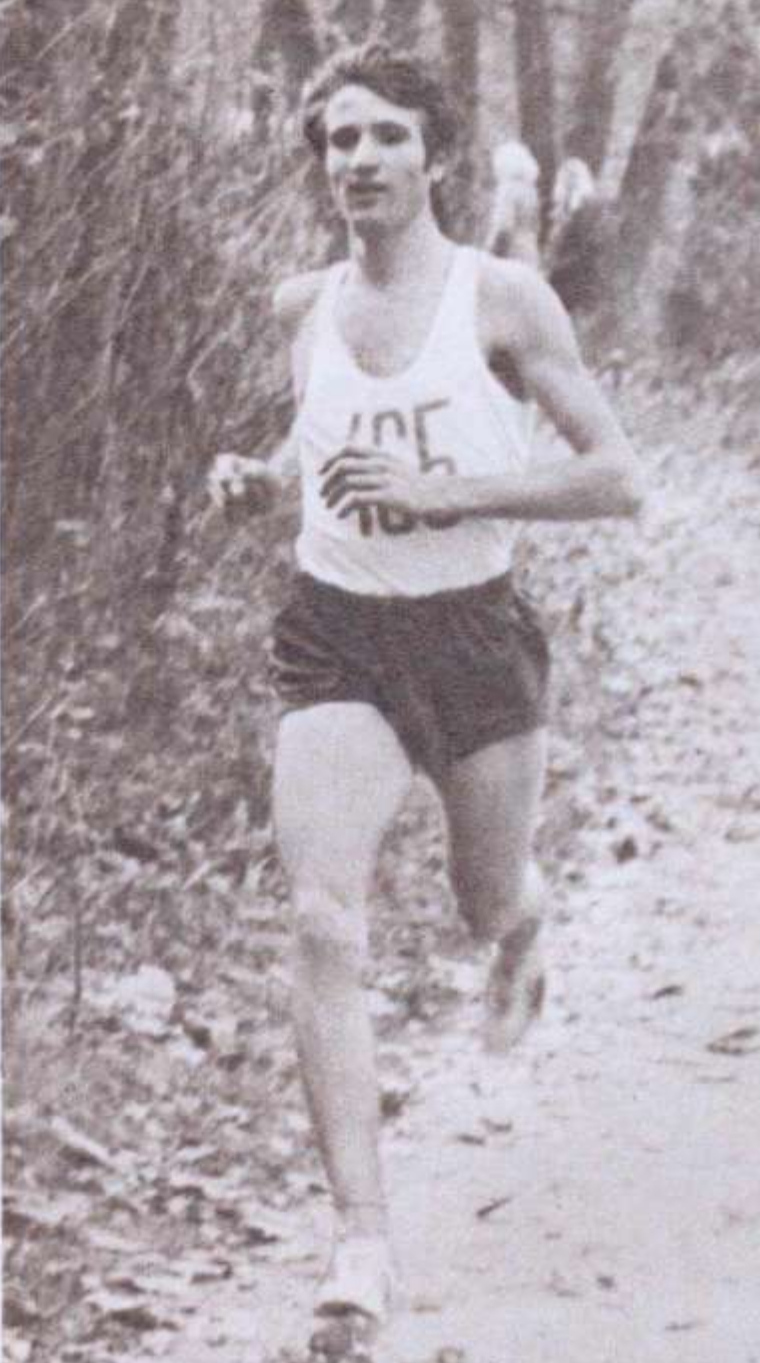
- Gheorghe Ghipu in 1972

Personal information
- Nationality: Romanian
- Born: 30 September 1954 (age 71) Dascălu, Ilfov, Romania

Sport
- Sport: Middle-distance running
- Events: 800 metres, 1500 metres
Medal record
Men's athletics
Representing Romania
European Indoor Championships
Bronze medal – third place	1975 Katowice	1500 m
Bronze medal – third place	1976 Munich	1500 m
Summer Universiade
Bronze medal – third place	1975 Rome	1500 m

Gheorghe Ghipu (born 30 September 1954) is a Romanian middle-distance runner. He competed in the men's 800 metres at the 1972 Summer Olympics.
