= Ivo Van Damme =

Belgian middle-distance runner

Personal information
- Born: 21 February 1954 Dendermonde, Belgium
- Died: 29 December 1976 (aged 22) Orange, Vaucluse, France
- Height: 1.91 m (6 ft 3 in)
- Weight: 76 kg (168 lb)

Sport
- Sport: Athletics
- Events: 800 m, 1500 m

Achievements and titles
- Personal bests: 800 m – 1:43.86 (1976); 1500 m – 3:36.26 (1976)
Medal record
Men's athletics
Representing Belgium
Olympic Games
Silver medal – second place	1976 Montreal	800 m
Silver medal – second place	1976 Montreal	1,500 m
European Indoor Championships
Gold medal – first place	1976 Munich	800 m
Silver medal – second place	1975 Katowice	800 m

Ivo Van Damme (21 February 1954 – 29 December 1976) was a Belgian middle-distance runner.

Van Damme played football until he was 16, but then switched to athletics. His breakthrough came in 1973, when he placed fourth in the 800 m at the European Junior Championships.

He suffered from mononucleosis the following season, but returned strong beating Roger Moens's 1955 national 800 m record. The record stood for 48 years and was finally bettered by Eliott Crestan in 2024. In 1976, he won the European indoor title over this distance, and was one of the favourites for a medal at the 1976 Summer Olympics in Montreal. He eventually ended up second in both the 800 and 1500 m, finishing behind Alberto Juantorena and John Walker, respectively.

These were his last successes, as Van Damme was killed in a car accident later that year while travelling home from Marseille in southern France. He was to marry Rita Thijs in 1977. Since 1977, a memorial competition has been held in Brussels to remember him, the Memorial Van Damme, which is now the championship final for selected disciplines of the Diamond League athletics tour.
