= Vittorio Fontanella =

Italian middle-distance runner

Personal information
- Nationality: Italian
- Born: 17 March 1953 (age 73) Chiampo, Italy
- Height: 1.76 m (5 ft 9 1/2 in)
- Weight: 63 kg (139 lb)

Sport
- Country: Italy
- Sport: Athletics
- Event: 1500 metres
- Club: C.S. Carabinieri

Achievements and titles
- Personal best: 1500 m: 3:35.93 (1981)

Vittorio Fontanella (born 17 March 1953 in Chiampo, Vicenza) is a former middle-distance runner from Italy.

== Biography ==
He set his personal best (3:35.93) in the men's 1500 meter in 1981. He also owned the Italian national record in the mile until 1991, set in Zurich during the same competition in which he set the national record in the 1500m event. He also held the Italian national record in the 3000m event (7:45.02, in Bologna 12 September 1981). He is currently a gymnastic teacher in the public school system.

== Olympic results ==
Year	Competition	Venue	Position	Event	Performance	Notes
1980	Olympic Games	Moscow, Soviet Union	5th	1500 metres	3:40.4	

== National titles ==
Vittorio Fontanella has won 4 times the individual national championship.

- 3 wins in the 1500 metres (1975, 1976, 1979)
- 1 win in the 800 metres indoor (1973)

== See also ==
- Italian all-time lists - 1500 metres
- List of Italian records in masters athletics
