= Harald Hudak =

German middle-distance runner (1957–2024)

Personal information
- Nationality: West German
- Born: 28 January 1957 Vaihingen an der Enz
- Died: 2 December 2024 (aged 67)

Sport
- Sport: Athletics
- Event: middle/long-distance
- Club: Bayer 04 Leverkusen

Harald Hudak (28 January 1957 – 2 December 2024) was a West German middle-distance runner who specialised in 1500 metres.

== Biography ==
Hudak was born in Vaihingen an der Enz. He was one of the runners that set a world record of 14:38.8 minutes in the 4x1500 metres relay in 1977, together with Thomas Wessinghage, Michael Lederer, and Karl Fleschen. He ran 3:40.2 minutes on the second leg.

He finished sixth in 1500 m at the 1979 European Indoor Championships. In 1980, Hudak temporarily became the third-fastest 1500 m runner of all time when he set a personal best of 3:31.96 minutes at a meeting in Koblenz where Steve Ovett set a new world record and Thomas Wessinghage set a new West German record. 3:31.96 remained his career best time. In Germany only Thomas Wessinghage has run faster. However, Hudak could not participate in the 1980 Summer Olympics in Moscow due to the West German boycott.

Hudak competed for the sports club Bayer 04 Leverkusen during his active career. At the West German championships, in the 1500 metres, Hudak won the bronze medal in 1979 and silver medals in 1980 and 1981 (all events won by Thomas Wessinghage). Hudak also won the silver medal at the 1979 West German indoor championships.

Hudak won the British AAA Championships title in the 5,000 metres event at the 1980 AAA Championships.

Hudak died on 2 December 2024, at the age of 67.
