= Frank Clement (athlete) =

British runner (born 1952)

Personal information
- Nationality: British
- Born: 26 April 1952 (age 74) Glasgow, Scotland
- Height: 180 cm (5 ft 11 in)
- Weight: 66 kg (146 lb)

Sport
- Sport: Athletics
- Event: middle-distance
- Club: Bellahouston Harriers
Medal record
Representing Great Britain
Men's athletics
Summer Universiade
Gold medal – first place	1973 Moscow	1500 m

Francis James Clement (born 26 April 1952) is a retired British athlete who competed primarily in the 1500 metres and participated in the 1976 Summer Olympics.

== Biography ==
Clement was a member of Bellahouston Harriers and a graduate of Strathclyde University.

Clement finished second behind Rod Dixon in the 1500 metres event at the 1973 AAA Championships but by virtue of being the highest placed British athlete in the event he was considered the British 1500 metres champion.

In 1973 Clement achieved success in the European Cup final which he won in a time of 3:40.8, defeating future Olympic bronze medalist Paul-Heinz Wellmann and 1974 European champion Klaus-Peter Justus. He also won the 1973 World Student Games (Universiade) 1500m in a time of 3:42.32 defeating the top American runner Tony Waldrop. Clement was a UK 1,500 metres and mile record holder in the 1970s and won the Emsley Carr Mile in 1973 and again in 1974.

Clement improved the British record for 1,500 metres in 1974 to 3:37.4. He set British mile records of 3:54.95 in 1975 and 3:54.2 in 1978. Clement recorded his fastest time for 1,500 of 3:35.66 in 1978. His other personal bests included: 800 metres – 1:45.76; 1,000 metres - 2:19.81 (1975); 2,000 metres - 5:02.8 (1978). Clement also repeated his 1973 AAA success by finishing second again but being the top British athlete in the 1500m at the 1975 AAA Championships.

Clement was an Olympic 1500 m finalist coming fifth at the 1976 Games in Montreal in a time of 3:39.65. He was also fourth in the 1978 Commonwealth Games in Edmonton.

After retiring from competitive athletics, Clement worked for 26 years for Glasgow City Council, where he was race director of the Glasgow Women's 10,000m.
