= Marc Nevens =

Belgian middle-distance runner

Personal information
- Nationality: Belgian
- Born: 6 November 1954 (age 71) Mortsel
- Height: 187 cm (6 ft 2 in)
- Weight: 79 kg (174 lb)

Sport
- Country: Belgium
- Sport: Middle-distance running

Marc Nevens (born 6 November 1954) is a Belgian Olympic middle-distance runner.

Nevens was born in Mortsel, the son of cross-country runner and steeplechaser Leon Nevens (1928-1992). In the course of his career Marc Nevens competed at senior level in every distance from 800 metres to 5000 metres. He represented his country in the men's 1500 metres at the 1976 Summer Olympics. His time was a 3:44.18 in the first heat, and a 3:41.52 in the semifinals. At an international athletics meeting in Aarhus, Denmark, later in the same year, he won the 1500-metre event in a time of 3:40.09.
