= Henryk Wasilewski =

Polish middle-distance runner

Personal information
- Born: 19 December 1953 Wołów, Poland
- Died: 16 July 2012 (aged 58)

Sport
- Sport: Track and field

Henryk Wasilewski (19 December 1953 – 16 July 2012) was a Polish middle-distance runner who specialized in the 1500 metres.

He finished fifth in the 1500 metres at the 1977 European Indoor Championships. He also competed at the 1974 European Championships and the 1978 European Indoor Championships without reaching the final. He became Polish champion in 1975, 1976, 1977 and 1978, and became Polish indoor champion in the 3000 metres in 1977.

His personal best time was 3.37.3 minutes, achieved in July 1977 in Warsaw. In the mile run he had 3.57.61 minutes, achieved in August 1977 in West Berlin.
