= Ray Flynn (athlete) =

Irish middle-distance runner

Personal information
- Nationality: Irish
- Born: 22 January 1957 (age 69) Longford, Ireland

Sport
- Sport: Track
- Events: 1500 meters; mile
- College team: East Tennessee State University

Achievements and titles
- Personal best(s): 1500 metres: 3:33.5; Mile: 3:49.77; 3000 meters: 7:41.60; 5000 meters: 13:19.52
Medal record
Men's athletics
Representing Ireland
European Indoor Championships
Silver medal – second place	1980 Sindelfingen	1500 m
- Updated on 1 October 2017

Raymond P. Flynn (born 22 January 1957) is a retired middle-distance runner who works as a sports agent. During his racing career, Flynn ran 89 sub-four minute miles. He ran his best time of 3:49.77 on 7 July 1982 in Oslo, Norway at the Bislett Games Dream Mile. The time still stands as the outdoor Irish national record, but was surpassed when Andrew Coscoran ran 3:49.26 indoors in 2025. Flynn also held the Irish 1500 metres record for 41 years after running 3:33.5, in the same Oslo race.

In 1989, he founded Flynn Sports Management, among the biggest athlete management agencies in athletics. Flynn is also the meet director of the Millrose Games.

== Running career ==
=== Collegiate ===
While attending St Mel's College in Longford, Ireland, Flynn won the 1500 meters race at the Great Britain Championships against other high school runners, after which he earned an athletic scholarship to East Tennessee State University in Johnson City. At ETSU, he was a member of the 1975 team which won the USA Track & Field Cross Country Championship, and was an NCAA All-American athlete in both track and cross country, finishing only 0.08 seconds behind Steve Scott in the 1,500 meter final at the 1978 NCAA Track & Field Championships. Flynn still holds the ETSU records for the 1500 meters and mile, both indoor and outdoor.

On 30 April 1977, Flynn ran his first sub-4 minute mile at the Penn Relays in Philadelphia with a time of 3:59.4. In June 1977, he finished in last place in the men's 1500 meters finals of the NCAA DI Outdoor T&F Championships with a time of 3:42.90.

=== Post-collegiate ===
Flynn represented Ireland in the 1980 and 1984 Summer Olympic Games, where he was a finalist in the 5000 meters. On 6 February 1981, Flynn finished in second place at the Wanamaker Mile in a time of 3:53.8. He had the lead in the last lap until he was passed by Eamonn Coghlan, who won in 3:53.0. Flynn won the British AAA Championships title in the 5,000 metres event at the 1984 AAA Championships.

In 1985, Flynn was a member of Ireland's four-man squad along with Marcus O'Sullivan, Eamonn Coghlan, and Frank O'Mara. They set a world record time of 15:49.08 in the 4 x mile relay, in a charity fund-raising race in Dublin.

== After retirement ==
Ray Flynn

Meet director of the Millrose Games
- Incumbent
- Assumed office 2012
- Preceded by: Mark Wetmore

=== Millrose Games ===
Since 2012, Flynn has served as the meeting director of the Millrose Games, a prestigious indoor track and field meeting held at the Fort Washington Avenue Armory in Manhattan, New York.

=== Sports management career ===
In 1989, Flynn founded Flynn Sports Management (FSM), which grew into one of the largest agencies in track and field. The agency represents a number of elite athletes.
