= Paul-Heinz Wellmann =

German runner (born 1952)

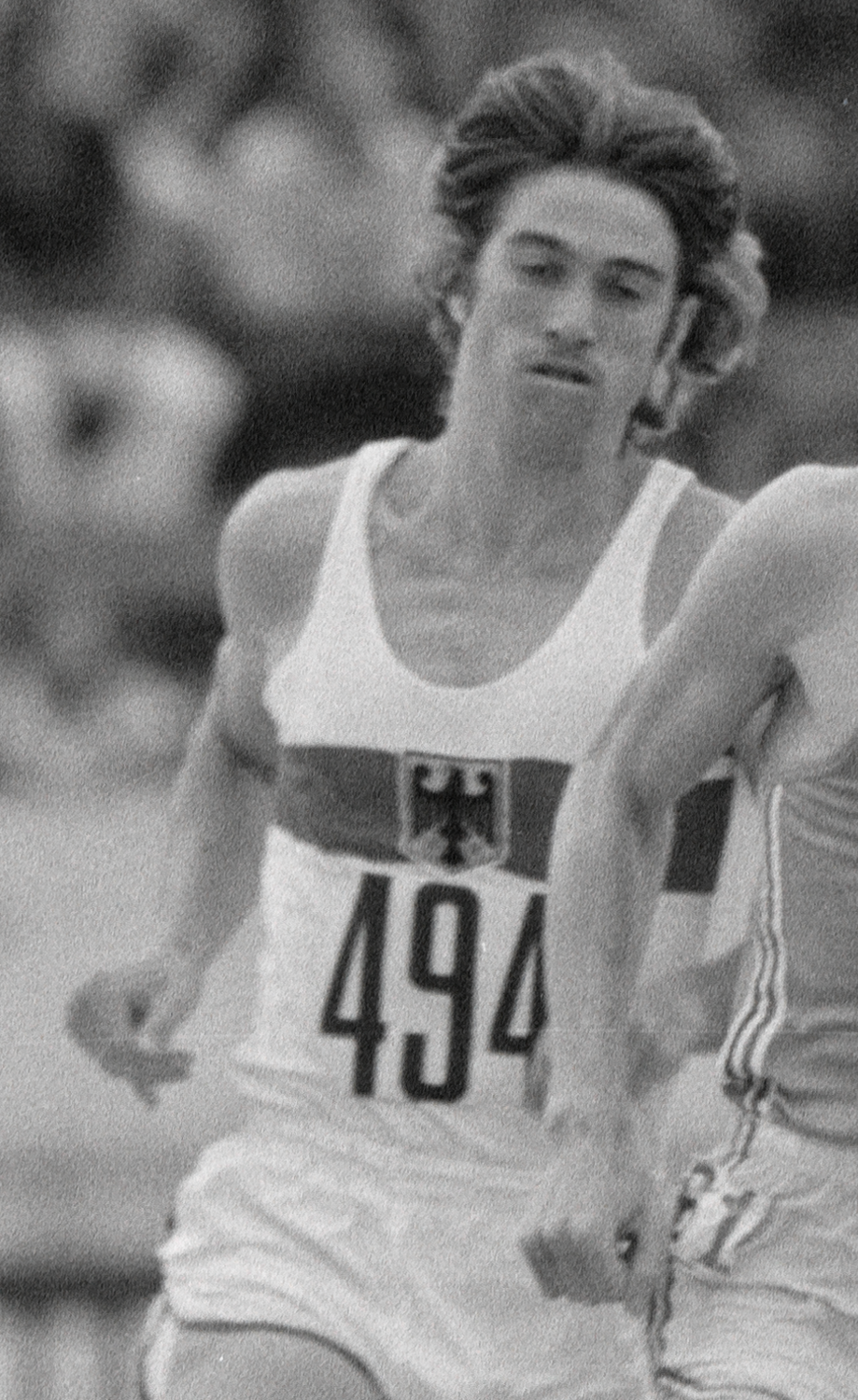
- Wellmann in 1974

Personal information
- Born: 31 March 1952 (age 74) Haiger, Germany
- Height: 182 cm (6 ft 0 in)
- Weight: 70 kg (154 lb)
Medal record
Men's athletics
Representing West Germany
Olympic Games
Bronze medal – third place	1976 Montreal	1500 m
European Indoor Championships
Gold medal – first place	1972 Grenoble	4×720 m
Gold medal – first place	1973 Rotterdam	4×680 m
Gold medal – first place	1976 Munich	1500 m
Silver medal – second place	1977 San Sebastián	1500 m
Bronze medal – third place	1971 Sofia	4×800 m

Paul-Heinz Wellmann (born 31 March 1952 in Haiger) is a former West German middle-distance runner who specialized in the 1500 metres.

As a teenager he won the silver medal at the 1970 European Junior Championships. He then finished seventh at the 1971 European Championships, the 1972 Summer Olympics and the 1974 European Championships.

He then won the gold medal at the 1976 European Indoor Championships, the bronze medal at the 1976 Summer Olympics and the silver medal at the 1977 European Indoor Championships

At the European Indoor Championships he had previously won three medals in relay races: a bronze medal in 4 × 800 m in 1971, and gold medals in 4 × 720 m in 1972 and 1973.

In domestic competitions, Wellmann represented the sports clubs TV 1885 Haiger and later TuS 04 Leverkusen. He became West German 800 metres champion in 1973 and 1500 metres champion in 1973, 1974 and 1976. He had a rivalry with Thomas Wessinghage.

Wellmann was trained by Gerd Osenberg, and after retiring he has trained Sonja Oberem and others. He was married to fellow distance runner Ellen Tittel for a period, who then took the surname Wellmann. They later divorced, but Ellen later married Thomas Wessinghage and took the name Ellen Wessinghage.
