= Thomas Wessinghage =

German distance runner

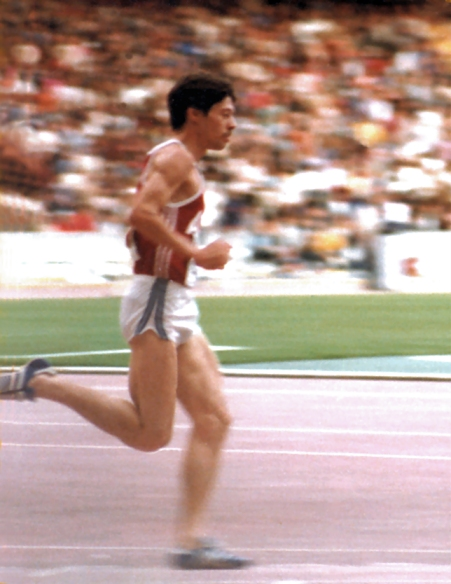
- Wessinghage in 1981

Personal information
- Born: 22 February 1952 (age 74) Hagen, North Rhine-Westphalia, West Germany

Sport
- Sport: Track and field
Medal record
Representing West Germany
European Championships
Gold medal – first place	1982 Athens	5000 m
Bronze medal – third place	1974 Rome	1500 m
European Indoor Championships
Gold medal – first place	1972 Grenoble	4×720 m
Gold medal – first place	1973 Rotterdam	4×680 m
Gold medal – first place	1975 Katowice	1500 m
Gold medal – first place	1980 Sindelfingen	1500 m
Gold medal – first place	1981 Grenoble	1500 m
Silver medal – second place	1974 Gothenburg	1500 m
Silver medal – second place	1976 Munich	1500 m
Silver medal – second place	1978 Milan	1500 m
Silver medal – second place	1979 Vienna	1500 m
Summer Universiade
Gold medal – first place	1975 Rome	1500 m

Thomas Wessinghage (born 22 February 1952) is a German former middle- and long-distance runner who won the 1982 European Championships' final over 5000 metres beating the British world-record holder David Moorcroft. As he was already 30 years old at the time, and had been an international-level runner for a decade, this victory was a long-awaited one for him. He was in top form, having set a European record at 2000 metres shortly before the Championships, and because he was the fastest 1500-metre runner in the final, having run that distance in 3 minutes 31.6 seconds in 1980. Shortly after he started his final sprint with over 250 metres to go, Wessinghage moved into a decisive lead, stretching it into five metres by 4800 metres and almost doubling it by 4900 metres.

In 1980, he set a German record of 3:31.58 min over 1500 metres which stood for 45 years. In the same race Steve Ovett from the UK set a world record of 3:31.36 min. He was married to former Olympian Ellen Tittel. Wessinghage missed a great chance of winning an Olympic medal that year because West Germany joined the United States-led boycott. He was unlucky also in the other Olympic years of his competitive career: he was eliminated in the 1500-metre heats in the 1972 and 1976 Olympics, and he was injured in a race before the 1984 Olympics.

In the 1983 inaugural World Athletics Championships, he was among the favourites to win the 5000-metre title, but for some reason he could not accelerate enough when it mattered the most - during the final lap - despite running at a steady rhythm earlier in the race. Accordingly, he dropped from third to sixth during the last lap, and lost to the winner, Ireland's Eamonn Coghlan, by almost four seconds.

His last major competitive race was in the 5000-metre qualifying heats of the 1986 European Athletics Championships in Stuttgart. In that race, he failed to advance to the final.

== International competitions ==
Year	Competition	Venue	Position	Event	Notes
Representing West Germany
1970	European Junior Championships	Paris, France	8th	1500 m	3:57.68
1972	European Indoor Championships	Grenoble, France	1st	4 × 720 m relay	6:26.4
1972	Olympic Games	Munich, West Germany	21st (sf)	1500 m	3:43.4
1973	European Indoor Championships	Rotterdam, Netherlands	1st	4 × 720 m relay	6:21.58
1973	Universiade	Moscow, Soviet Union	3rd (h)	1500 m	3:44.6^{1}
1974	European Indoor Championships	Gothenburg, Sweden	2nd	1500 m	3:42.02
1974	European Championships	Rome, Italy	3rd	1500 m	3:41.1
1975	European Indoor Championships	Katowice, Poland	1st	1500 m	3:44.6
1975	Universiade	Rome, Italy	1st	1500 m	3:39.73
1976	European Indoor Championships	Munich, West Germany	2nd	1500 m	3:45.3
1977	World Cup	Düsseldorf, West Germany	2nd	1500 m	3:35.98
1978	European Indoor Championships	Milan, Italy	2nd	1500 m	3:38.23
1978	European Championships	Prague, Czechoslovakia	4th	1500 m	3:37.19
1979	European Indoor Championships	Vienna, Austria	2nd	1500 m	3:42.2
1979	World Cup	Montreal, Canada	1st	1500 m	3:46.00^{2}
1980	European Indoor Championships	Sindelfingen, West Germany	1st	1500 m	3:37.54
1981	European Indoor Championships	Grenoble, France	1st	1500 m	3:42.64
1982	European Indoor Championships	Milan, Italy	4th	1500 m	3:39.79
1982	European Championships	Athens, Greece	1st	5000 m	13:28.90
1983	European Indoor Championships	Budapest, Hungary	1st	1500 m	3:39.82
1983	World Championships	Helsinki, Finland	6th	5000 m	13:32.46
1984	European Indoor Championships	Gothenburg, Sweden	3rd	1500 m	3:41.75
1985	European Indoor Championships	Piraeus, Greece	2nd	3000 m	8:10.88
1986	European Indoor Championships	Madrid, Spain	5th	3000 m	8:00.76
1986	European Championships	Stuttgart, West Germany	17th (h)	5000 m	13:33.98

^{1}Did not finish in the final
^{2}Representing Europe
