= Pierre Délèze =

Swiss middle-distance runner

Personal information
- Born: August 25, 1958 (age 67) Nendaz, Valais, Switzerland

Sport
- Sport: Track and field
Medal record
Representing Switzerland
European Indoor Championships
Bronze medal – third place	1980 Sindelfingen	1500 m
Summer Universiade
Silver medal – second place	1979 Mexico City	1500 m

Pierre Délèze (born August 25, 1958) is a former Swiss middle distance runner who set a national record of 3:31.75 min when he won the 1500 m race at the meeting in Zurich in 1985, defeating the reigning Olympic champion Sebastian Coe. He also set a national record over the Mile in 3:50.38 min in Koblenz in 1982.

Délèze participated in the 1500 m final at the 1983 World Championships in Athletics in Helsinki in which he fninshed sixth. The race was won by Steve Cram. In the 1987 World Championships in Athletics in Rome he finished fourth over 5000 m; the gold was won by Saïd Aouita.

== International competitions ==
Year	Competition	Venue	Position	Event	Notes
Representing Switzerland
1980	Olympic Games	Moscow, Soviet Union	24th (h)	1500 m	3:44.72
1982	European Championships	Athens, Greece	7th	1500 m	3:39.64
1983	World Championships	Helsinki, Finland	6th	1500 m	3:43.69
1984	Olympic Games	Los Angeles, United States	heats	1500 m	DNF (fell)
1986	European Championships	Stuttgart, Germany	7th	5000 m	13:28.80
1987	World Championships	Rome, Italy	4th	5000 m	13:28.06
1988	Olympic Games	Seoul, South Korea	41st (h)	5000 m	14:12.79
(h) Indicates overall position in qualifying heats. DNF = did not finish

== General references ==
- "Highlights sportifs de la deuxième décennie (1981-1990) | Jubiläum 50". swiss-athletics.ch (in French). 18 March 2021.
