= Claudio Patrignani =

Italian middle-distance runner (born 1959)

Personal information
- Nationality: Italian
- Born: 9 January 1959 (age 67) Fano, Italy
- Height: 1.79 m (5 ft 10 1/2 in)
- Weight: 65 kg (143 lb)

Sport
- Country: Italy
- Sport: Athletics
- Event: Middle distance running
- Club: Pro Patria Milano

Achievements and titles
- Personal best: 1500 m: 3:36.8 (1983)
Medal record
Summer Universiade
Gold medal – first place	1983 Edmonton	1500 metres

Claudio Patrignani (born 9 January 1959 in Fano, Pesaro e Urbino) is a retired male middle-distance runner from Italy.

He competed for his native country at the 1984 Summer Olympics in Los Angeles, California. Patrignani set his personal best (3:36.08) in the men's 1,500 metres in 1983. He has 38 caps in national team from 1979 to 1986.

== International competitions ==
Year	Competition	Venue	Position	Event	Notes
1984	Olympic Games	Los Angeles, United States	Heat	1500 metres	3:52:63

== National titles ==
Patrignani has won 8 times the individual national championship.

- 5 wins in the 1500 metres (1981, 1982, 1983, 1984, 1987)
- 3 wins in the 1500 metres indoor (1979, 1983, 1986)

== See also ==
- Italian all-time lists - 1500 metres
