= José Manuel Abascal =

Spanish middle-distance runner

Personal information
- Full name: José Manuel Abascal Gómez
- Born: 17 March 1958 (age 68) Alceda, Cantabria, Spain
- Height: 182 cm (6 ft 0 in)
- Weight: 67 kg (148 lb)
Medal record
Men's athletics
Representing Spain
Olympic Games
Bronze medal – third place	1984 Los Angeles	1500 m
European Championships
Bronze medal – third place	1982 Athens	1500 m
European Indoor Championships
Silver medal – second place	1982 Milan	1500 m

José Manuel Abascal Gómez (born 17 March 1958) is a former Spanish 1500 metres runner.

In 1982, he received the silver medal at the European Indoor Championship in 1500 m and the bronze medal in the same event at the European Outdoor Championship. He won the bronze medal at the 1984 Summer Olympics. In 1986, he set a personal best of 3:31.13 min but he failed to qualify for the final in 1500 m European Championship. At the 1987 IAAF World Indoor Championships, Abascal also won a silver medal.

== Biography ==
José Manuel Abascal was born in Alceda, Cantabria, and spent his childhood in the remote Pas Valley, living in rural conditions without electricity or running water. His early experiences, including long walks to school and farm work, contributed to his endurance and work ethic.

His success inspired a generation of Spanish middle-distance runners, including Fermín Cacho and Reyes Estévez, establishing Spain as a formidable presence in the 1500 meters.

After retiring from competition in 1992, Abascal remained active in athletics. He served as a sports coordinator in Santa Cruz de Bezana for 20 years before moving to Calafell in 2015 to promote sports development.

In 1992, he was one of the flag bearers at the opening ceremony of the Barcelona Olympics, symbolizing his lasting impact on Spanish athletics.

== Sporting career ==
Abascal began his athletic career in cross-country, winning his first school race in Zaragoza and later becoming the Spanish youth champion in 1975. In 1977, he was part of the Spanish junior team that won silver at the World Cross Country Championships in Düsseldorf.

Abascal was a dominant figure in Spanish middle-distance running, securing national titles in the 1500 meters in 1978, 1981, 1982, 1984, and 1985, and in the 3000 meters indoor in 1982. His personal best in the 1500 meters was 3:31.13, achieved in Barcelona in 1986.

In 1984, during an indoor tour in the United States, Abascal won three consecutive mile races, including setting a new meet record of 3:56.56 in Richfield. His performances during this tour demonstrated his tactical acumen and finishing speed.

In 1987, he achieved a personal best of 13:12.49 in the 5000 meters in Oslo, one of the top times globally that year.

== Awards and honors ==
Abascal was named Spain's best athlete in 1984 and was honored with the prestigious Prince of Asturias Award for Sports in 1985, recognizing his significant contributions to Spanish athletics.

He had the honor of being one of the flag bearers during the opening ceremony of the 1992 Summer Olympics in Barcelona.

In 1994 Abascal was awarded the Silver Medal of the Royal Order of Sports Merit in 1994.

== Achievements ==
- 800 metres – 1:49.5 in Madrid 19–07–1980.
- 3000 metres steeple – 8:38.8 in San Sebastián 29–08–1981.
- 1500 metres – 3:31.13 in Barcelona 16–08–1986.
- Mile – 3:50.54 in Rome 10–11–1986.
- 3000 metres – 7:53.51 in A Coruña 4–08–1988.
- 5000 metres – 13:12.49 in Oslo 04–07–1987.
