= Antti Loikkanen =

Medal record

Men's Athletics

Representing Finland

European Athletics Indoor Championships
Gold medal – first place	1978 Milan	1500 m
Bronze medal – third place	1982 Milan	1500 m
Bronze medal – third place	1983 Budapest	1500 m

Antti Olavi Loikkanen (born 15 April 1955 in Enonkoski, Etelä-Savo) is a Finnish former middle-distance and endurance runner. Loikkanen was one of Finland's most successful 800 meter and 1500 meter runners in the beginning of the 1980s. His greatest achievements were in indoor athletics competitions.

Loikkanen was the Finnish champion in 800 metres in 1979 and in the 1500 metres in 1980. In indoor competitions, he won the 1500 metres (in 1978), the 800 metres (1981) and the 1500 metres (1985). His best result in outdoor track competitions was a 5th place in the 1500 metres race in the 1978 European Championships in Athletics in Prague. In the 1978 European Indoor Championships in Athletics in Milan, Loikkanen won gold with a national record time of 3:38.16. He won bronze in the same event at the 1982 and 1983 Championships, was 4th in 1979 and 1984, and 6th in 1985. Loikkanen also participated in the Olympic Games in Montreal 1976, Moscow 1980 and Los Angeles 1984 and in the 1983 World Championships in Athletics in Helsinki.

In 1500 metres Loikkanen ran on June 16, 1980, at Imatra, Finland in 3:36.3, which remains a Finnish record. In the 800 metres, Loikkanen's record was 1:47.1, which he ran on June 12, 1979, at Imatra. Loikkanen ran his record in the 3000 metres on June 21, 1982, in Tampere. His time, 7:46.87, is the 6th fastest Finnish time for the distance.

After his sports career, Loikkanen has worked as a firefighter.
