= 1982 European Athletics Championships – Men's 800 metres =

Men's 800 metres at the European Athletics Championships

These are the official results of the Men's 800 metres event at the 1982 European Championships in Athens, Greece, held at Olympic Stadium "Spiros Louis" on 6, 7, and 8 September 1982.

== Medalists ==
Gold	Hans-Peter Ferner; West Germany
Silver	Sebastian Coe; United Kingdom
Bronze	Jorma Härkönen; Finland

== Results ==
=== Final ===
8 September

Rank	Name	Nationality	Time	Notes
1st place, gold medalist(s)	Hans-Peter Ferner	West Germany	1:46.33	
2nd place, silver medalist(s)	Sebastian Coe	United Kingdom	1:46.68	
3rd place, bronze medalist(s)	Jorma Härkönen	Finland	1:46.90	
4	Garry Cook	United Kingdom	1:46.94	
5	Rob Druppers	Netherlands	1:47.06	
6	Detlef Wagenknecht	East Germany	1:47.06	
7	Olaf Beyer	East Germany	1:47.36	
8	Willi Wülbeck	West Germany	1:48.90	

=== Semi-finals ===
7 September

==== Semi-final 1 ====
Rank	Name	Nationality	Time	Notes
1	Hans-Peter Ferner	West Germany	1:48.71	Q
2	Rob Druppers	Netherlands	1:48.92	Q
3	Garry Cook	United Kingdom	1:49.03	Q
4	Detlef Wagenknecht	East Germany	1:49.11	Q
5	Matthias Assmann	West Germany	1:49.19	
6	Colomán Trabado	Spain	1:49.38	
7	Hans-Joachim Mogalle	East Germany	1:49.58	
8	Didier Le Guillou	France	1:51.74	

==== Semi-final 2 ====
Rank	Name	Nationality	Time	Notes
1	Sebastian Coe	United Kingdom	1:47.98	Q
2	Olaf Beyer	East Germany	1:48.05	Q
3	Willi Wülbeck	West Germany	1:48.16	Q
4	Jorma Härkönen	Finland	1:48.22	Q
5	Aleksey Litvinov	Soviet Union	1:48.38	
6	José Marajo	France	1:48.49	
7	Arno Körmeling	Netherlands	1:49.20	
8	Andrés Vera	Spain	1:49.35	

=== Heats ===
6 September

==== Heat 1 ====
Rank	Name	Nationality	Time	Notes
1	Sebastian Coe	United Kingdom	1:48.66	Q
2	Hans-Peter Ferner	West Germany	1:48.67	Q
3	José Marajo	France	1:49.12	Q
4	Anatoliy Reshetnyak	Soviet Union	1:49.23	
5	Julien Michiels	Belgium	1:49.69	
6	Carlos Cabral	Portugal	1:49.84	
7	Donato Sabia	Italy	1:50.27	

==== Heat 2 ====
Rank	Name	Nationality	Time	Notes
1	Olaf Beyer	East Germany	1:47.97	Q
2	Rob Druppers	Netherlands	1:48.24	Q
3	Willi Wülbeck	West Germany	1:48.40	Q
4	Philippe Dupont	France	1:48.61	
5	Spyros Spyrou	Cyprus	1:49.11	
6	José Antonio Pacheco	Spain	1:50.03	

==== Heat 3 ====
Rank	Name	Nationality	Time	Notes
1	Hans-Joachim Mogalle	East Germany	1:48.02	Q
2	Matthias Assmann	West Germany	1:48.14	Q
3	Andrés Vera	Spain	1:48.24	Q
4	Aleksey Litvinov	Soviet Union	1:48.36	q
5	Didier Le Guillou	France	1:48.36	q
6	Klas-Göran Nissén	Sweden	1:50.46	
7	John Chappory	Gibraltar	1:53.02	

==== Heat 4 ====
Rank	Name	Nationality	Time	Notes
1	Detlef Wagenknecht	East Germany	1:47.67	Q
2	Colomán Trabado	Spain	1:47.69	Q
3	Jorma Härkönen	Finland	1:47.92	Q
4	Garry Cook	United Kingdom	1:48.14	q
5	Arno Körmeling	Netherlands	1:48.48	q
6	Jón Diðriksson	Iceland	1:50.30	

== Participation ==
According to an unofficial count, 26 athletes from 15 countries participated in the event.

- Belgium (1)
- Cyprus (1)
- East Germany (3)
- Finland (1)
- France (3)
- Gibraltar (1)
- Iceland (1)
- Italy (1)
- Netherlands (2)
- Portugal (1)
- Soviet Union (2)
- Spain (3)
- Sweden (1)
- United Kingdom (2)
- West Germany (3)

== See also ==
- 1978 Men's European Championships 800 metres (Prague)
- 1980 Men's Olympic 800 metres (Moscow)
- 1983 Men's World Championships 800 metres (Helsinki)
- 1984 Men's Olympic 800 metres (Los Angeles)
- 1986 Men's European Championships 800 metres (Stuttgart)
- 1987 Men's World Championships 800 metres (Rome)
- 1988 Men's Olympic 800 metres (Seoul)
