= 1978 European Athletics Championships – Men's 800 metres =

Men's 800 metres at the European Athletics Championships

These are the official results of the Men's 800 metres event at the 1978 European Championships in Prague, Czechoslovakia. The final was held on 31 August 1978.

The two favourites for the race were Steve Ovett and Sebastian Coe Ovett had won silver at 800 m at the previous European Championships in 1974 in Rome, and had won the 1500m, in spectacular fashion, at the IAAF World Cup the previous year (he was to remain unbeaten at that distance until the 1980 Olympics). Coe was the new British record holder at 800 m and the fastest man that year leading into the race at 800 m.

The race was billed in the press, the British press in particular, as a 'Coe versus Ovett' contest - a race that was the start of a rivalry that was to dominate not only British and European but World middle-distance running over the next few years. However, by concentrating on Coe and Ovett the press were ignoring the other talents in the race, including East Germany's Olaf Beyer.

In the race itself, Coe led from the front setting a blistering first lap pace, going through the bell in a suicidal 49.32 s. At 700 m, he was spent and Ovett kicked past him for home. However, the fast-finishing Beyer first caught Coe and then Ovett to strike gold, in doing so recording the fastest time that year.

== Medalists ==
Gold	Olaf Beyer; East Germany
Silver	Steve Ovett; Great Britain
Bronze	Sebastian Coe; Great Britain

== Results ==
=== Final ===
31 August

Rank	Name	Nationality	Time	Notes
1st place, gold medalist(s)	Olaf Beyer	East Germany	1:43.84	CR
2nd place, silver medalist(s)	Steve Ovett	Great Britain	1:44.09	
3rd place, bronze medalist(s)	Sebastian Coe	Great Britain	1:44.76	
4	Anatoliy Reshetnyak	Soviet Union	1:45.79	
5	Vladimir Podolyako	Soviet Union	1:46.24	
6	Andreas Busse	East Germany	1:47.1	
7	Dragan Životić	Yugoslavia	1:47.4	
8	José Marajo	France	1:53.4	

=== Semi-finals ===
30 August

==== Semi-final 1 ====
Rank	Name	Nationality	Time	Notes
1	Sebastian Coe	Great Britain	1:47.44	Q
2	Andreas Busse	East Germany	1:47.6	Q
3	José Marajo	France	1:47.7	Q
4	Vladimir Podolyako	Soviet Union	1:47.8	Q
5	Markku Taskinen	Finland	1:47.9	
6	Uwe Becker	West Germany	1:48.2	
7	Detlef Wagenknecht	East Germany	1:48.5	
8	Arno Körmeling	Netherlands	1:49.2	

==== Semi-final 2 ====
Rank	Name	Nationality	Time	Notes
1	Steve Ovett	Great Britain	1:46.51	Q
2	Olaf Beyer	East Germany	1:46.74	Q
3	Dragan Životić	Yugoslavia	1:46.94	Q
4	Anatoliy Reshetnyak	Soviet Union	1:47.2	Q
5	Hans-Peter Ferner	West Germany	1:47.4	
6	Sermet Timurlenk	Turkey	1:47.9	
7	Roger Milhau	France	1:48.9	
8	Günther Hasler	Liechtenstein	1:49.3	

=== Heats ===
29 August

==== Heat 1 ====
Rank	Name	Nationality	Time	Notes
1	Steve Ovett	Great Britain	1:47.80	Q
2	Hans-Peter Ferner	West Germany	1:48.1	Q
3	Markku Taskinen	Finland	1:48.3	Q
4	Detlef Wagenknecht	East Germany	1:48.4	q
5	Vladimir Malozemlin	Soviet Union	1:48.6	
6	Carlo Grippo	Italy	1:48.6	

==== Heat 2 ====
Rank	Name	Nationality	Time	Notes
1	Olaf Beyer	East Germany	1:47.72	Q
2	Arno Körmeling	Netherlands	1:48.1	Q
3	Günther Hasler	Liechtenstein	1:48.5	Q
4	Justin Gloden	Luxembourg	1:49.0	
5	David O’Donnell	Great Britain	1:49.3	

==== Heat 3 ====
Rank	Name	Nationality	Time	Notes
1	Andreas Busse	East Germany	1:49.08	Q
2	José Marajo	France	1:49.4	Q
3	Anatoliy Reshetnyak	Soviet Union	1:49.5	Q
4	Milovan Savić	Yugoslavia	1:50.0	
5	Milan Timko	Czechoslovakia	1:50.5	
6	Panagiotis Pallikaris	Greece	1:51.6	

==== Heat 4 ====
Rank	Name	Nationality	Time	Notes
1	Sebastian Coe	Great Britain	1:46.82	Q
2	Roger Milhau	France	1:47.07	Q
3	Uwe Becker	West Germany	1:47.13	Q
4	Dragan Životić	Yugoslavia	1:47.18	q
5	Vladimir Podolyako	Soviet Union	1:47.19	q
6	Sermet Timurlenk	Turkey	1:47.23	q
7	Jón Didriksson	Iceland	1:50.4	

== Participation ==
According to an unofficial count, 24 athletes from 15 countries participated in the event.

- Czechoslovakia (1)
- East Germany (3)
- Finland (1)
- France (2)
- Greece (1)
- Iceland (1)
- Italy (1)
- Liechtenstein (1)
- Luxembourg (1)
- Netherlands (1)
- Soviet Union (3)
- Turkey (1)
- Great Britain (3)
- West Germany (2)
- Yugoslavia (2)

== See also ==
- 1974 Men's European Championships 800 metres (Rome)
- 1976 Men's Olympic 800 metres (Montreal)
- 1980 Men's Olympic 800 metres (Moscow)
- 1982 Men's European Championships 800 metres (Athens)
- 1983 Men's World Championships 800 metres (Helsinki)
- 1984 Men's Olympic 800 metres (Los Angeles)
- 1986 Men's European Championships 800 metres (Stuttgart)

== Other Links ==
- Results 1978 European Championship Results
