= Athletics at the 1980 Summer Olympics – Men's 800 metres =

Men's 800 metres at the Games of the XXII Olympiad
- Venue: Lenin Stadium
- Date: 24–26 July 1980
- Competitors: 41 from 28 nations
- Winning time: 1:45.4

Medalists
1st place, gold medalist(s)		Steve Ovett; Great Britain
2nd place, silver medalist(s)		Sebastian Coe; Great Britain
3rd place, bronze medalist(s)		Nikolay Kirov; Soviet Union

Official Video

The men's 800 metres was an event at the 1980 Summer Olympics in Moscow, Soviet Union. There were a total number of 41 participating athletes from 28 nations, with six qualifying heats, three semifinals, and the final held on Saturday July 26, 1980. The maximum number of athletes per nation had been set at 3 since the 1930 Olympic Congress. The event was won by 0.5 seconds by Steve Ovett of Great Britain, the nation's first gold medal in the men's 800 metres since winning four in a row from 1920 to 1932. It was Great Britain's sixth overall title in the event.

== Background ==
This was the 19th appearance of the event, which is one of 12 athletics events to have been held at every Summer Olympics. None of the 1976 medalists returned, but three finalists did: fifth-place finisher Steve Ovett of Great Britain, seventh-place finisher Sriram Singh of India, and eight-place finisher Carlo Grippo of Italy. Ovett and his countryman Sebastian Coe were the favorites; Coe held the world record, though Ovett had beaten him at the 1978 European Championships (both behind Olaf Beyer of East Germany, also a challenger in Moscow). The United States-led boycott kept out world number one Don Paige.

Benin, Botswana, Bulgaria, Guinea, Kuwait, Laos, Lesotho, Libya, Sierra Leone, and Syria appeared in the event for the first time. Great Britain made its 18th appearance, most among all nations, having had no competitors in the event only in the 1904 Games in St. Louis.

== Competition format ==
The competition used the three-round format that had been in use for most Games since 1912. The "fastest loser" system introduced in 1964 was used for both the first round and semifinals. There were six first-round heats, each with 6 or 7 athletes; the top three runners in each heat as well as the next six fastest overall advanced to the semifinals. There were three semifinals with 8 athletes each; the top two runners in each semifinal as well as the next two fastest overall advanced to the eight-man final.

== Records ==
Prior to the competition, the existing World and Olympic records were as follows.

World record	Sebastian Coe (GBR)	1:42.4	Oslo, Norway	5 July 1979
Olympic record	Alberto Juantorena (CUB)	1:43.50	Montreal, Canada	25 July 1976

No world or Olympic records were set during the competition.

== Schedule ==
All times are Moscow Time (UTC+3)

Date	Time	Round
Thursday, 24 July 1980	19:25	Round 1
Friday, 25 July 1980	18:15	Semifinals
Saturday, 26 July 1980	19:25	Final

== Results ==
=== Round 1 ===
The first round was held on Thursday, 24 July 1980.

==== Heat 1 ====
Rank	Athlete	Nation	Time	Notes
1	Steve Ovett	Great Britain	1:49.4	Q
2	Antonio Páez	Spain	1:49.5	Q
3	Philippe Dupont	France	1:49.6	Q
4	Sri Ram Singh	India	1:49.8	q
5	Abebe Zerihun	Ethiopia	1:50.3	
6	Langa Mudongo	Botswana	1:52.5	
7	Kenneth Hlasa	Lesotho	1:56.1	

==== Heat 2 ====
Rank	Athlete	Nation	Time	Notes
1	Detlef Wagenknecht	East Germany	1:47.5	Q
2	Nikolay Kirov	Soviet Union	1:47.5	Q
3	András Paróczai	Hungary	1:47.5	Q
4	Colomán Trabado	Spain	1:47.9	q
5	Musa Luliga	Tanzania	1:49.6	q
6	Jón Didriksson	Iceland	1:51.1	
7	George Branche	Sierra Leone	1:54.6	

==== Heat 3 ====
Rank	Athlete	Nation	Time	Notes
1	Andreas Busse	East Germany	1:47.4	Q
2	Anatoliy Reshetnyak	Soviet Union	1:47.9	Q
3	Agberto Guimarães	Brazil	1:48.2	Q
4	William Wuycke	Venezuela	1:48.5	q
5	Derradji Harek	Algeria	1:49.9	q
6	Tisbite Rakotoarisoa	Madagascar	1:50.5	
7	Khaled Hussain	Kuwait	1:54.6	

==== Heat 4 ====
Rank	Athlete	Nation	Time	Notes
1	Sebastian Coe	Great Britain	1:48.5	Q
2	Roger Milhau	France	1:48.5	Q
3	Binko Kolev	Bulgaria	1:48.7	Q
4	Carlo Grippo	Italy	1:48.9	q
5	Archfell Musango	Zambia	1:51.6	
6	Mohamed Makhlouf	Syria	1:52.3	
7	Jimmy Massallay	Sierra Leone	2:04.4	

==== Heat 5 ====
Rank	Athlete	Nation	Time	Notes
1	Olaf Beyer	East Germany	1:48.9	Q
2	Milovan Savić	Yugoslavia	1:49.2	Q
3	Owen Hamilton	Jamaica	1:49.3	Q
4	Salem El-Margini	Libya	1:50.0	
5	Atre Bezabeh	Ethiopia	1:52.7	
6	Adam Assimi	Benin	1:59.9	

==== Heat 6 ====
Rank	Athlete	Nation	Time	Notes
1	José Marajo	France	1:49.6	Q
2	David Warren	Great Britain	1:49.9	Q
3	Mehdi Aidet	Algeria	1:50.4	Q
4	Nigusse Bekele	Ethiopia	1:51.1	
5	Sekou Camara	Guinea	1:58.9	
6	Vongdeuane Phongsavanh	Laos	2:05.5	
7	Sahr Kendor	Sierra Leone	2:06.5	

=== Semifinals ===
The semifinals were held on Friday, 25 July 1980.

==== Semifinal 1 ====
Rank	Athlete	Nation	Time	Notes
1	Steve Ovett	Great Britain	1:46.6	Q
2	Andreas Busse	East Germany	1:46.9	Q
3	Agberto Guimarães	Brazil	1:46.9	q
4	Owen Hamilton	Jamaica	1:47.6	
5	Milovan Savić	Yugoslavia	1:47.6	
6	Roger Milhau	France	1:48.1	
7	Colomán Trabado	Spain	1:48.1	
8	Mehdi Aidet	Algeria	1:48.2	

==== Semifinal 2 ====
Rank	Athlete	Nation	Time	Notes
1	Sebastian Coe	Great Britain	1:46.7	Q
2	Detlef Wagenknecht	East Germany	1:46.7	Q
3	Binko Kolev	Bulgaria	1:47.3	
4	William Wuycke	Venezuela	1:47.4	
5	Anatoliy Reshetnyak	Soviet Union	1:48.2	
6	Philippe Dupont	France	1:49.7	
7	Musa Luliga	Tanzania	1:51.5	
8	Derradji Harrek	Algeria	1:51.9	

==== Semifinal 3 ====
Rank	Athlete	Nation	Time	Notes
1	Nikolay Kirov	Soviet Union	1:46.6	Q
2	David Warren	Great Britain	1:47.2	Q
3	José Marajo	France	1:47.3	q
4	Olaf Beyer	East Germany	1:47.6	
5	Antonio Páez	Spain	1:47.8	
6	Carlo Grippo	Italy	1:48.7	
7	András Paróczai	Hungary	1:48.8	
8	Sriram Singh	India	1:49.0	

=== Final ===
This Olympic 800-metre final was a notably tactical one. Already on the first back straight, there was some physical contact in the tightly bunched eight-man field. Britain's Steve Ovett was boxed in and pushed East Germany's Detlef Wagenknecht, in order to get more room and a tactically better place. The first 200 metres were run in about 26 seconds, according to the long-time BBC sports journalist David Coleman. At that point, Brazil's Agberto Guimaraes was leading the race, flanked by Britain's David Warren. On the first home straight, Ovett again tried to force his way to a better position, elbowing Wagenknecht and the Soviet Union's Nikolay Kirov. Unofficially the 400-metre split time was 54.55 seconds. Behind Guimaraes, Warren and Wagenknecht, Kirov and East Germany's Andreas Busse were tied for the fourth place. Ovett and France's José Marajo ran right behind Busse. The pre-race favourite Britain's Sebastian Coe, was running eighth, and almost touched the third lane's edge. At or around 430 or 440 metres, Warren suddenly sprinted past Guimaraes. Kirov rose to the second place, and on the final back straight, Ovett moved to the third place. With over 200 metres to run, Kirov kicked into the lead, followed closely by Ovett. Coe began to sprint hard, moving into fifth place. On the final bend, Kirov and Ovett were able to maintain their lead over Guimaraes and Coe. In the final straight's first half, Ovett easily passed Kirov while Coe passed Guimaraes and then Kirov. At the finish, Ovett was still three-and-a-half metres ahead of Coe, who finished second, half a metre ahead of the fading Kirov.

Rank	Athlete	Nation	Time
1st place, gold medalist(s)	Steve Ovett	Great Britain	1:45.4
2nd place, silver medalist(s)	Sebastian Coe	Great Britain	1:45.9
3rd place, bronze medalist(s)	Nikolay Kirov	Soviet Union	1:46.0
4	Agberto Guimarães	Brazil	1:46.2
5	Andreas Busse	East Germany	1:46.9
6	Detlef Wagenknecht	East Germany	1:47.0
7	José Marajo	France	1:47.3
8	David Warren	Great Britain	1:49.3

== See also ==
- 1978 Men's European Championships 800 metres (Prague)
- 1982 Men's European Championships 800 metres (Athens)
- 1983 Men's World Championships 800 metres (Helsinki)
- 1984 Men's Olympic Games 800 metres (Los Angeles)
- 1986 Men's European Championships 800 metres (Stuttgart)
