= 1983 World Championships in Athletics – Men's 800 metres =

Men's 800 metres at the 1983 World Championships
- Venue: Helsinki Olympic Stadium
- Dates: 7 August (heats); 8 August (semi-finals); 9 August (final)
- Competitors: 60 from 46 nations
- Winning time: 1:43.65 CR

Medalists
gold medal	Willi Wülbeck	West Germany
silver medal	Rob Druppers	Netherlands
bronze medal	Joaquim Cruz	Brazil

These are the official results of the men's 800 metres event at the 1983 IAAF World Championships in Helsinki, Finland. There were a total of 60 participating athletes, with eight qualifying heats, three semi-finals and the final held on 9 August 1983.

From the gun, World Junior Record holder and NCAA Champion Joaquim Cruz went out fast to get the lead, with Peter Elliott in lane 1 accelerating when he saw Cruz ahead of him, passing the break point swinging wide to go around Cruz but Cruz would not let him by. Coming off the turn, Elliott accelerated and ran past Cruz to take the lead at the bell in 50.58. Hans-Peter Ferner was next behind them, followed by Willi Wülbeck and Rob Druppers. Coming off the third turn, Cruz again accelerated to try to take back the lead. Down the backstretch, Cruz and Elliott ran shoulder to shoulder. Gritting his teeth, Elliott would not concede the position, Cruz running the final turn outside of Elliott still shoulder to shoulder with now Wülbeck watching the battle from two steps behind. Off the final turn, Cruz accelerated again to pull away from Elliott but Wülbeck went around the outside to sprint past both of them, unleaded to victory. Druppers came off the final turn several metres back, passed a fading Ferner and began sprinting, picking off Elliott and then Cruz just before the finish line.

== Records ==
Existing records at the start of the event.

World Record	Sebastian Coe (GBR)	1:41.73	Florence, Italy	June 10, 1981
Championship Record	New event			

== Results ==
=== Qualifying heats ===
The qualifying heats took place on 7 August, with the 60 athletes involved being split into 8 heats. The first 2 athletes in each heat ( Q ) and the next 8 fastest ( q ) qualified for the semifinals.

Heat 1

Rank	Name	Nationality	Time	Notes
1	James Robinson	United States	1:46.32	Q, CR
2	Garry Cook	Great Britain & N.I.	1:46.44	Q
3	Viktor Kalinkin	Soviet Union	1:46.57	q
4	Christoph Ulmer	Switzerland	1:47.98	
5	Jama Aden	Somalia	1:48.69	
6	Paul Gilbert	Australia	1:51.39	
7	Khaled Khalifa	Kuwait	1:52.84	
8	Sekou Camara	Guinea	1:59.90	

Heat 2

Rank	Name	Nationality	Time	Notes
1	Matthias Assmann	West Germany	1:47.45	Q
2	José Luíz Barbosa	Brazil	1:47.47	Q
3	Binko Kolev	Bulgaria	1:47.49	q
4	Peter Bourke	Australia	1:48.15	
5	Petru Drăgoescu	Romania	1:48.33	
6	Bo Breigan	Norway	1:49.53	
7	Mohammed Darwish	Iraq	1:50.68	

Heat 3

Rank	Name	Nationality	Time	Notes
1	Willi Wülbeck	West Germany	1:46.55	Q
2	Philippe Dupont	France	1:46.62	Q
3	David Patrick	United States	1:46.76	q
4	Babacar Niang	Senegal	1:47.54	
5	Donato Sabia	Italy	1:47.62	
6	Sotirios Moutsanas	Greece	1:48.23	
7	Vincent Confait	Seychelles	1:55.04	
8	Jean-Marie Rudasinqwa	Rwanda	1:55.12	

Heat 4

Rank	Name	Nationality	Time	Notes
1	Detlef Wagenknecht	East Germany	1:49.20	Q
2	Sammy Koskei	Kenya	1:49.35	Q
3	Omer Khalifa	Sudan	1:49.67	
4	Ronny Olsson	Sweden	1:49.72	
5	Simon Hoogewerf	Canada	1:49.92	
	Charlie Oliver	Solomon Islands		DNS
	Ryszard Ostrowski	Poland		DNS

Heat 5

Rank	Name	Nationality	Time	Notes
1	Agberto Guimarães	Brazil	1:48.30	Q
2	Alberto Juantorena	Cuba	1:48.40	Q
3	Juma Ndiwa	Kenya	1:48.40	
4	Mohamed Zahafi	Morocco	1:49.43	
5	Gordan Hinds	Barbados	1:50.92	
6	Didier Le Guillou	France	1:52.49	
7	Ruthsel Martina	Netherlands Antilles	1:55.67	

Heat 6

Rank	Name	Nationality	Time	Notes
1	David Mack	United States	1:45.84	Q, CR
2	Jorma Härkönen	Finland	1:46.39	Q
3	Peter Elliott	Great Britain & N.I.	1:46.53	q
4	José Marajo	France	1:46.78	q
5	Colomán Trabado	Spain	1:47.10	q
6	Kim Bock-ju	South Korea	1:48.40	
7	Tisbite Rakotoarisoa	Madagascar	1:50.70	
8	Antonio Cadio Paraiso	São Tomé and Príncipe	1:58.47	

Heat 7

Rank	Name	Nationality	Time	Notes
1	Rob Druppers	Netherlands	1:46.12	Q
2	Joaquim Cruz	Brazil	1:46.12	Q
3	Peter Pearless	New Zealand	1:47.22	q
4	Mike Solomon	Trinidad and Tobago	1:47.30	q
5	Faouzi Lahbi	Morocco	1:47.76	
6	Gawain Guy	Jamaica	1:49.19	
7	John Chappory	Gibraltar	1:52.30	

Heat 8

Rank	Name	Nationality	Time	Notes
1	Hans-Peter Ferner	West Germany	1:48.34	Q
2	Michael Hillardt	Australia	1:48.44	Q
3	James Maina Boi	Kenya	1:48.69	
4	Mark Handelsman	Israel	1:49.02	
5	Mohamed Alouini	Tunisia	1:49.09	
6	William Wuycke	Venezuela	1:50.71	
7	Luis Munguía	Nicaragua	1:55.77	
8	Clive Williams	Belize	2:03.64	

=== Semi-finals ===
The semifinals took place on 8 August, with the 24 athletes involved being split into 3 heats. The first 2 athletes in each heat ( Q ) and the next 2 fastest ( q ) qualified for the final.

Heat 1

Rank	Name	Nationality	Time	Notes
1	Joaquim Cruz	Brazil	1:45.62	Q, CR
2	James Robinson	United States	1:46.16	Q
3	Philippe Dupont	France	1:46.36	
4	Viktor Kalinkin	Soviet Union	1:46.83	
5	Mike Solomon	Trinidad and Tobago	1:47.10	
6	Matthias Assmann	West Germany	1:48.73	
7	Michael Hillardt	Australia	1:49.64	
	Alberto Juantorena	Cuba		DNS

Heat 2

Rank	Name	Nationality	Time	Notes
1	Willi Wülbeck	West Germany	1:46.21	Q
2	Agberto Guimarães	Brazil	1:46.37	Q
3	José Marajo	France	1:46.39	
4	David Mack	United States	1:46.39	
5	Colomán Trabado	Spain	1:46.85	
6	Garry Cook	Great Britain & N.I.	1:47.48	
7	Sammy Koskei	Kenya	1:48.92	
8	Binko Kolev	Bulgaria	1:50.23	

Heat 3

Rank	Name	Nationality	Time	Notes
1	Hans-Peter Ferner	West Germany	1:45.24	Q, CR
2	David Patrick	United States	1:45.30	Q
3	Peter Elliott	Great Britain & N.I.	1:45.38	q
4	Rob Druppers	Netherlands	1:45.55	q
5	Detlef Wagenknecht	East Germany	1:45.70	
6	Peter Pearless	New Zealand	1:47.82	
7	José Luíz Barbosa	Brazil	1:48.05	
8	Jorma Härkönen	Finland	1:49.39	

=== Final ===
The final took place on August 9.

Rank	Name	Nationality	Time	Notes
1st place, gold medalist(s)	Willi Wülbeck	West Germany	1:43.65	CR
2nd place, silver medalist(s)	Rob Druppers	Netherlands	1:44.20	
3rd place, bronze medalist(s)	Joaquim Cruz	Brazil	1:44.27	
4	Peter Elliott	Great Britain & N.I.	1:44.87	
5	James Robinson	United States	1:45.12	
6	Agberto Guimarães	Brazil	1:45.46	
7	Hans-Peter Ferner	West Germany	1:45.74	
8	David Patrick	United States	1:46.56	
