= Detlef Wagenknecht =

German middle-distance runner

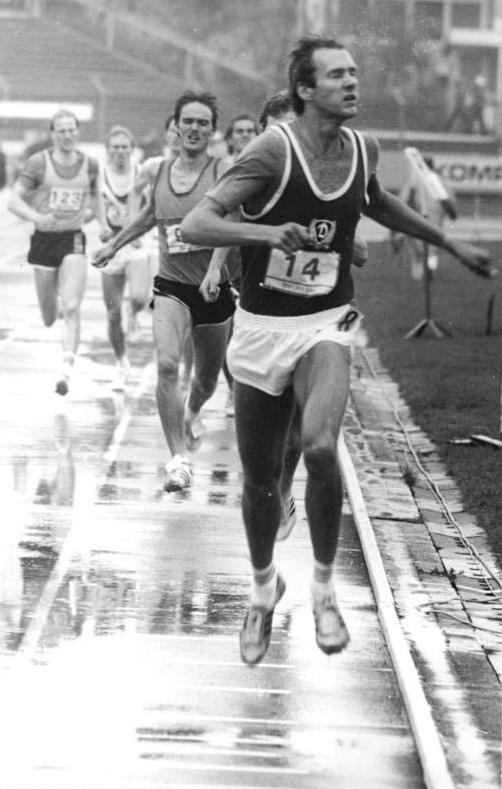
- Erfurt: Leichtathletik-Sportfest-1984

Personal information
- Born: 3 January 1959 (age 67) East Berlin, East Germany (now Berlin, Germany)
- Height: 193 cm (6 ft 4 in)
- Weight: 74 kg (163 lb)

Sport
- Country: East Germany
- Sport: Athletics
- Event: 800 metres
- Coached by: Jürgen Haase

Achievements and titles
- Personal best(s): 600 m: 1:15.68 (1983); 800 m: 1:44.81 (1981); 1000 m: 2:16.7a (1982)
Medal record
European Junior Championships
Gold medal – first place	1977 Donetsk	4 × 400 m relay
Silver medal – second place	1977 Donetsk	800 m

Detlef Wagenknecht (born 3 January 1959) is a German former middle-distance runner. Representing East Germany, he was a finalist in men's 800 metres at the 1980 Summer Olympics and the 1982 European Championships and placed third at the 1981 IAAF World Cup.

== Career ==
At the 1977 European Junior Championships in Donetsk, Wagenknecht won gold in the 4 × 400 m relay (as part of the East German team) and silver in the individual 800 m (behind his teammate Andreas Busse). In 1978 Wagenknecht became East German champion for the first time, running a personal best 1:45.84 at the national championships to defeat Jürgen Straub and Olaf Beyer; at the European Championships in Prague later that summer he was eliminated in the semi-finals as Beyer won gold.

Wagenknecht lost to Beyer in the 1979 East German championships, but regained his title in 1980. At the 1980 Summer Olympics in Moscow he won his heat and placed a close second to Sebastian Coe in his semi-final; in the final he placed sixth, the second-best East German after Busse.

At the 1981 East German championships in Jena, Wagenknecht again lost to Beyer, but placed second in a personal best 1:44.81. He represented East Germany at the 1981 IAAF World Cup in Rome, placing third behind Coe and James Robinson; Track & Field News ranked Wagenknecht a career-best fifth in the world in its 1981 rankings, the second time (after 1978) that he'd been ranked in the top ten.

In 1982, Wagenknecht won his third national title, ahead of Beyer; at the European Championships in Athens he placed sixth. He was ranked seventh in the world by Track & Field News, his third and final top ten appearance. In 1983 he was national champion both indoors and outdoors, but was eliminated in the semi-finals at the inaugural Athletics World Championships in Helsinki; he stayed with the leading group until the end, but was outkicked.

Wagenknecht won his final East German titles in 1984, repeating as indoor and outdoor champion. At the 1985 IAAF World Cup in Canberra he placed fourth.

Nationally, Wagenknecht represented Sports Club Dynamo Berlin. He was coached by former long-distance runner Jürgen Haase.
