= 1978 European Athletics Championships – Men's 1500 metres =

Men's 1500 metres at the European Athletics Championships

These are the official results of the Men's 1,500 metres event at the 1978 European Championships in Prague, Czechoslovakia. The final was held on 3 September 1978.

== Medalists ==
Gold	Steve Ovett; Great Britain
Silver	Eamonn Coghlan; Ireland
Bronze	David Moorcroft; Great Britain

== Results ==
=== Final ===
3 September

Rank	Name	Nationality	Time	Notes
1st place, gold medalist(s)	Steve Ovett	Great Britain	3:35.59	CR
2nd place, silver medalist(s)	Eamonn Coghlan	Ireland	3:36.57	
3rd place, bronze medalist(s)	David Moorcroft	Great Britain	3:36.70	
4	Thomas Wessinghage	West Germany	3:37.19	
5	Antti Loikkanen	Finland	3:37.54	
6	José Marajo	France	3:38.20	
7	Jürgen Straub	East Germany	3:38.88	
8	John Robson	Great Britain	3:39.6	
9	Olaf Beyer	East Germany	3:39.7	
10	Francis Gonzalez	France	3:40.1	
11	Rolf Gysin	Switzerland	3:41.0	
12	Jozef Plachý	Czechoslovakia	3:42.2	

== Heats ==
1 September

=== Heat 1 ===
Rank	Name	Nationality	Time	Notes
1	Eamonn Coghlan	Ireland	3:39.98	Q
2	David Moorcroft	Great Britain	3:40.0	Q
3	Olaf Beyer	East Germany	3:40.1	Q
4	Thomas Wessinghage	West Germany	3:40.1	q
5	José Marajo	France	3:40.6	q
6	Valeriy Abramov	Soviet Union	3:40.9	
7	Bernhard Vifian	Switzerland	3:42.5	
8	Robert Nemeth	Austria	3:44.1	
9	Ari Paunonen	Finland	3:45.0	
10	José Manuel Abascal	Spain	3:47.6	
11	Marcel Pierrard	Luxembourg	3:52.8	
	Klaas Lok	Netherlands	DNF	

=== Heat 2 ===
Rank	Name	Nationality	Time	Notes
1	Steve Ovett	Great Britain	3:42.94	Q
2	Jürgen Straub	East Germany	3:43.1	Q
3	Rolf Gysin	Switzerland	3:43.2	Q
4	Marc Nevens	Belgium	3:43.2	
5	Ray Flynn	Ireland	3:44.1	
6	Dietmar Millonig	Austria	3:44.8	
7	Vladimir Sheronov	Soviet Union	3:45.1	
8	Günther Hasler	Liechtenstein	3:46.7	
9	Philippe Dien	France	3:47.4	
10	Björn Nilsson	Sweden	3:47.9	
11	Jón Didriksson	Iceland	3:48.1	

=== Heat 3 ===
Rank	Name	Nationality	Time	Notes
1	Antti Loikkanen	Finland	3:39.66	Q
2	John Robson	Great Britain	3:40.0	Q
3	Francis Gonzalez	France	3:40.4	Q
4	Jozef Plachý	Czechoslovakia	3:40.6	q
5	Pierre Délèze	Switzerland	3:40.7	
6	Günther Ruth	East Germany	3:41.4	
7	Lars Ericsson	Sweden	3:42.5	
8	Valeriy Toropov	Soviet Union	3:45.1	
9	Sermet Timurlenk	Turkey	3:45.8	
10	Fotios Kourtis	Greece	3:45.9	
	Karl Fleschen	West Germany	DNF	

== Participation ==
According to an unofficial count, 34 athletes from 19 countries participated in the event.

- Austria (2)
- Belgium (1)
- Czechoslovakia (1)
- East Germany (3)
- Finland (2)
- France (3)
- Greece (1)
- Iceland (1)
- Ireland (2)
- Liechtenstein (1)
- Luxembourg (1)
- Netherlands (1)
- Soviet Union (3)
- Spain (1)
- Sweden (2)
- Switzerland (3)
- Turkey (1)
- Great Britain (3)
- West Germany (2)

== See also ==
- 1974 Men's European Championships 1,500 metres (Rome)
- 1976 Men's Olympic 1,500 metres (Montreal)
- 1980 Men's Olympic 1,500 metres (Moscow)
- 1982 Men's European Championships 1,500 metres (Athens)
- 1983 Men's World Championships 1,500 metres (Helsinki)
- 1984 Men's Olympic 1,500 metres (Los Angeles)
