= Steve Ovett =

British runner (born 1955)

Steve Ovett OBE
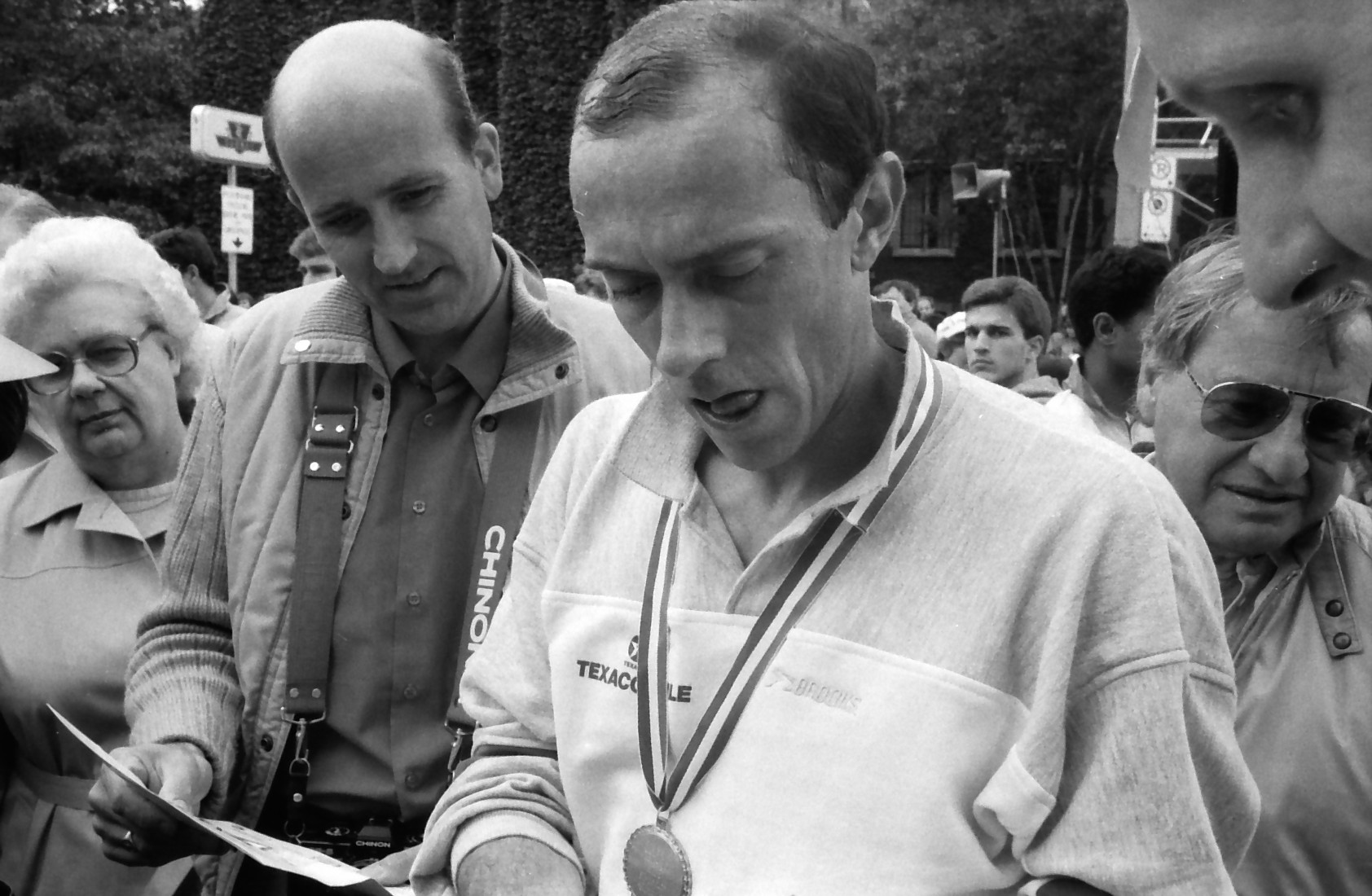
- Ovett in Toronto, Ontario, Canada in September 1986

Personal information
- Born: 9 October 1955 (age 71) Brighton, Sussex, England
- Height: 6 ft 0 in (183 cm)
- Weight: 154 lb (70 kg)

Sport
- Sport: Track
- Events: 800 metres, 1500 metres, mile, 5000 metres

Achievements and titles
- Personal bests: 800 m: 1:44.09; 1500 m: 3:30.77; Mile: 3:48.40; 3000 m: 7:41.3; 2-mile: 8:13.51; 5000 m: 13:20.06
Medal record
Men's athletics
Representing Great Britain
Olympic Games
Gold medal – first place	1980 Moscow	800 m
Bronze medal – third place	1980 Moscow	1500 m
European Championships
Gold medal – first place	1978 Prague	1500 m
Silver medal – second place	1974 Rome	800 m
Silver medal – second place	1978 Prague	800 m
IAAF World Cup
Gold medal – first place	1977 Düsseldorf	1500 m
Gold medal – first place	1981 Rome	1500 m
Representing England
Commonwealth Games
Gold medal – first place	1986 Edinburgh	5000 m

Stephen Michael James Ovett, OBE (/oʊˈvɛt/; born 9 October 1955) is a British retired track athlete. A middle-distance runner, he was the gold medalist in the 800 metres at the 1980 Olympic Games in Moscow. Ovett set five world records for 1500 metres and the mile run, and a world best at two miles. He won 45 consecutive 1500 and mile races from 1977 to 1980.

== Early life ==
Born in Brighton, Sussex, and educated at Varndean Grammar School, Ovett was a talented teenage athlete. As a youngster, he showed great promise as a footballer, but gave it up for athletics, because he preferred individual rather than team sports. As a youngster he won the under-15 (Junior boys) English Schools' Athletics Championships title at 400 metres in 1970 and the under-17 (Intermediate boys) 800 metres title in 1972.

== Athletics career ==
=== Early promise ===
Ovett's first major athletics title came in 1973, when he won the 800 metres at the 1973 European Athletics Junior Championships. The following year, still only aged 18, he won the silver medal at 800 metres in the 1974 European Athletics Championships, setting a new European Junior 800 m record of 1:45.77 in the process. Ovett won AAA titles in the 800 m from 1974 to 1976; he would later add to these AAA titles by winning the 1500 m in 1979 and the mile in 1980.

Ovett gained some Olympic experience in 1976 Summer Olympics in Montreal, Quebec, Canada, when he ran in the final of the 800 m and was placed fifth, behind winner Alberto Juantorena of Cuba. Ovett finished fifth because he ran the first lap too inconsistently. He failed to reach the 1500 m final, having been obstructed in the semi-final when Canadian athlete Dave Hill fell and Ovett had to hurdle over him. As this happened 170 m from the finish, Ovett had little time to recover, and was out-sprinted to the line by fellow countryman, Dave Moorcroft, with Ovett finishing only sixth.

=== Breakthrough to world prominence ===
In 1977, Ovett began to regularly defeat the 1500 metres Olympic champion John Walker. In the early season Debenhams Mile, Ovett defeated Walker and set a British record of 3:54.7. Then in the European Cup 1500 m, Ovett produced a last lap of 52.4 seconds to win a fiercely competitive race just ahead of his friend and rival Thomas Wessinghage. At the inaugural IAAF World Cup in Athletics, he commenced a "kick" with 200 m to go, running the final turn in 11.8 s and the last 200 m in 25.1 s. He left John Walker and the rest of the field far behind. He won gold ahead of Wessinghage. As Ovett raced away from the field, Ron Pickering, commenting for the race on BBC Television, said "and there's one man's blazing speed that has torn this field asunder". Ovett's time of 3:34.45 was a British record.

The British public by now showed a keen interest in Ovett, and it was at the European Championships in 1978, that he raced against Sebastian Coe for the first time in their senior careers, beginning a rivalry that was widely covered. He led Coe in the 800 m and appeared to be on his way to gold, before being caught by the East German Olaf Beyer, whose time of 1:44:09 turned out to be his fastest ever 800 m run. Coe finished 3rd. At the time the British press reported that Coe and Ovett had clashed after the race but Coe later revealed: "When Steve came over, he put his hand on my shoulder and said something. The media thought we were having a row, but what Steve actually said was, 'Who the fuck was that?'" Ovett recovered to win the gold medal in the 1500 m, in which Coe did not participate. In that race, Ovett waved to the crowd on the home straight and clearly slowed down in the last metres yet still won by over a second from Ireland's Eamonn Coghlan.

In 1978, Ovett set extremely fast times at disparate distances. He ran an 800 m in 1:44.09 (the world record at the time was Alberto Juantorena's 1:43.44) and set a 2-mile world's best with 8:13.51, handing Track & Field News Athlete of the Year Henry Rono one of his few losses in his record-breaking season.

During his career, Ovett was noted for the unusual range of his races; shortly before the 1980 Olympics, he ran four events of four different lengths in 10 days: a mile in Oslo, 800 metres in Gothenburg, 600 m at Crystal Palace and 3000 m in Welwyn Garden City. In 1977, when an airline strike forced him to miss a scheduled event, he signed up at the last minute for the Dartford half-marathon and won it with ease, wearing borrowed shoes, in a time of 1:05:38, running a course more than twice as long as anything he had attempted in public before, against the British marathon champion.

Ovett arrived at the 1980 Moscow Olympics as favourite to take the 1500 m title, being unbeaten over the 1500 m and the mile for three years. Earlier that month, he had established a new mile world record of 3:48.8 and two weeks later equalled Sebastian Coe's world record of 3:32.1 in the 1500 m. The Moscow Olympics marked only the second time that Ovett and Coe had met each other in international competition (the first being the 800 m in the 1978 European Championships), and there was huge media speculation over which would emerge as the greater.

Ovett's participation in the 800 m would serve as a test for the 1500 m. In the 800 m final, Ovett was only in sixth place at the halfway mark, but pushed his way through the crowd to second place. Seventy metres from the line, Ovett took the lead and held off a challenge from Coe to win by four metres. In the 1500 m, contested six days later, Ovett ran close behind Coe's shoulder for most of the race, but on the final bend Coe made a strong 'kick' and Ovett dropped two metres behind, unable to close the gap in the home straight. Coe won gold, East Germany's Jürgen Straub, who had accelerated after 800 metres, held off Ovett for the silver medal, and Ovett had to settle for bronze.

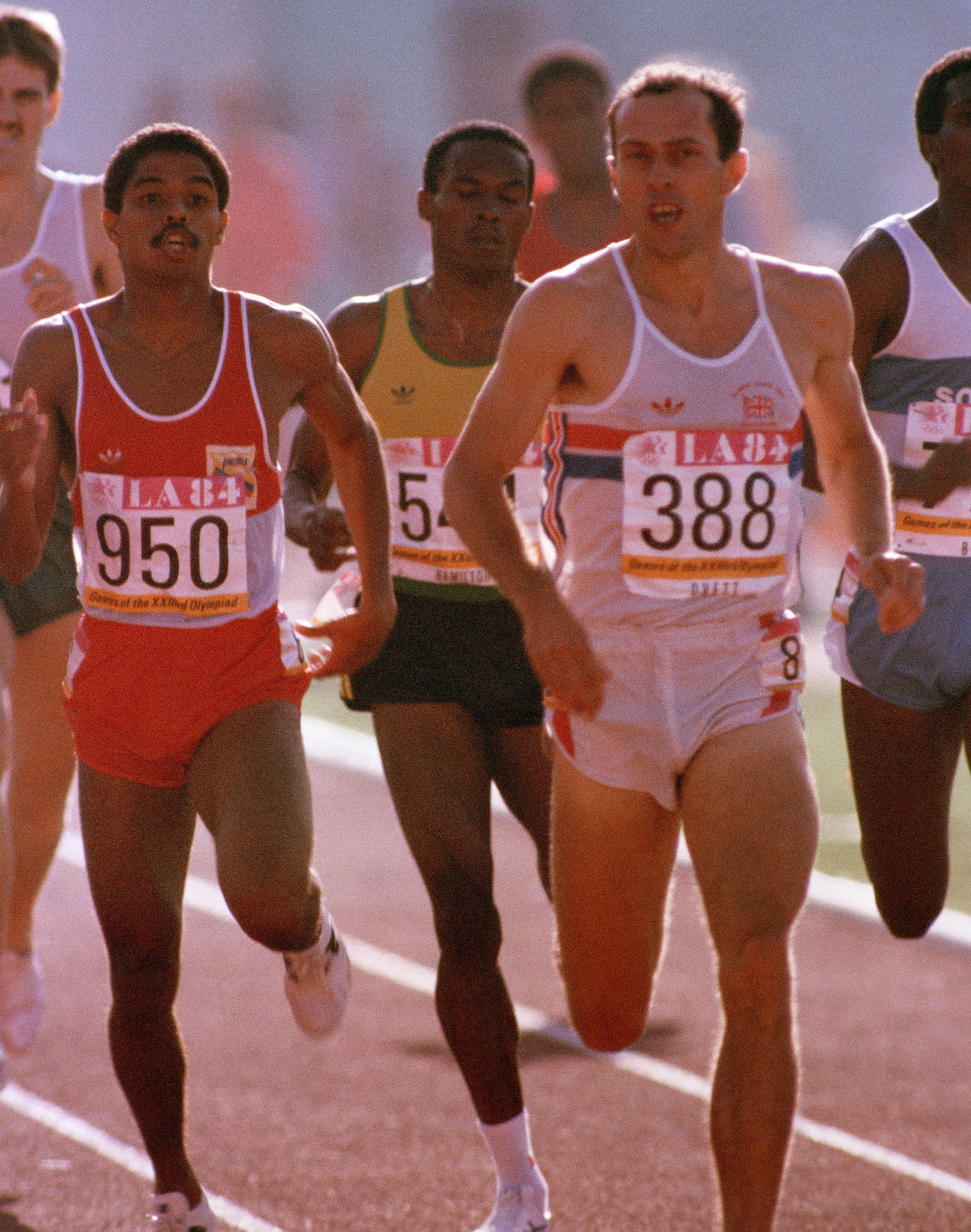
Ovett in an 800 metres quarter-final at the 1984 Summer Olympics

Though in 1980 Ovett had tied Coe's 1500 m world record of 3:32.1, new timing rules came into effect in 1981, which would recognise records over 400 m to the hundredth of a second. This would have the effect of giving Coe sole possession of the record, as Coe ran 3:32.03 to Ovett's 3:32.09. However, Ovett avoided this unusual removal of a record via rule change by setting a new record later in 1980 of 3:31.36.

During 1981, both Ovett and Coe were at their peak. They did not meet in a race that year but exchanged world records in the mile three times during a 9-day period. Ovett suffered an upset in a 1500 m race in Oslo that year. With Ovett and Coe so dominant and Coe not involved in the race, Ovett was the strong favourite. During the race Tom Byers, who had been asked to act as a pacemaker, set off quickly and the pack, being given the split times for the leader and believing that they were going faster than they actually were, declined to follow his pace. As a result, by the start of the last lap Byers had a lead of almost ten seconds and so decided to finish the race. Ovett ran the last lap almost nine seconds quicker than Byers but finished second by 0.53s, later commenting "We all ran like a load of hacks."

Ovett's 1982 season was wrecked by injury. When out training on the streets of Brighton in late 1981, he tripped and impaled his thigh on some low railings at St John the Baptist Church on Church Road. He had recovered by the spring of 1982, but further injuries hampered his progress.

=== Later career ===
He returned to action in 1983, although once again his season had been hampered by injuries, which resulted in his not being selected for the 800 m at the World Championships in Helsinki. He was selected for the 1500 m, but ran a poor tactical race in the final and finished 4th, behind winner Steve Cram. He was yet to reach his peak for 1983, which followed with a 1500 m world record of 3:30.77 in Rieti. A few days later, he finished a close 2nd to Steve Cram in an epic mile race in Crystal Palace.

In 1984, after a successful season of winter training in Australia, Ovett's progress was slightly hampered by minor injuries and a bout of bronchitis. He attempted to defend his 800 m title in the 1984 Olympic Games, but after arriving in Los Angeles he began to suffer from respiratory problems. He was unlucky to be drawn against eventual winner Joaquim Cruz in each of his two heats and also the semi-final, in which he only narrowly qualified for the final, lunging for the finish in 4th place and appearing to collapse over the line. He had run 1:44:81, his second fastest time ever at the distance. He recovered in time to make the final, but was clearly below his best and finished eighth, after which he collapsed and spent two nights in hospital. Against the advice of his friends and doctors, he returned a few days later to compete in the 1500 m. Running in fourth place at the beginning of the last lap of the final, Ovett dropped out. He later collapsed with chest pains and was taken away on a stretcher.

His career then wound down, although in August 1986 he won the 5000 m at the Commonwealth Games in Edinburgh. However, the following month, in the European Championships, he failed to finish in hot conditions, allowing Jack Buckner (GB) - whom Ovett had beaten with consummate ease in Edinburgh - to win the gold. In the 1987 World Athletics Championships, he finished a lacklustre tenth in the 5000-metres final. He then failed to make the 1988 Olympic team and finally announced his retirement in 1991, a year after Sebastian Coe.

== Post-retirement ==
He has been a track and field television commentator for the Canadian Broadcasting Corporation since 1992. He now lives in Australia and was a part of the BBC's on-location commentary team for the 2006 Commonwealth Games in Melbourne.

In 1987 a bronze statue of Steve Ovett was erected in Preston Park, Brighton. However, it was stolen in 2007, and later replaced in 2012 with a copy of the original. (The replacement is in Madeira Drive.)

== Personal life ==
During the Moscow Games, the British press homed in on a signal Ovett had made to a television camera in Moscow, after his 800 m win. It later transpired that the signal represented the letters ILY (I love you) and were intended for his girlfriend, Rachel Waller (whom he later married, but from whom he is now divorced).

His brother, Nick Ovett, represented Great Britain at luge in the Winter Olympics of 1988 and 1992.

Ovett's son Freddy also showed promise as a middle-distance runner, winning the U-13 Pan-Pacific 800 m title, before switching to road cycling after sustaining a knee injury whilst at the University of Oregon. He joined the development squad of the French AG2R La Mondiale team in 2015.

== Personal bests ==
Distance	Time	Date
400 metres	47.5	1974
800 metres	1:44.09	1978
1000 metres	2:15.91	1979
1500 metres	3:30.77	1983
Mile	3:48.40	1981
2000 metres	4:57.71	1982
3000 metres	7:41.3	1977
Two miles	8:13.51	1978
5000 metres	13:20.06	1986
Half Marathon	1:05:38	1977

- From UK Athletics

Records
Preceded by Sebastian Coe; Sydney Maree	Men's 1500 metres world record holder 27 August 1980 – 28 August 1983; 4 September 1983 – 16 July 1985	Succeeded by Sydney Maree; Steve Cram
Preceded by Sebastian Coe; Sebastian Coe	Men's mile run world record holder 1 July 1980 – 19 August 1981; 26 August 1981 – 28 August 1981	Succeeded by Sebastian Coe; Sebastian Coe
Preceded by Sebastian Coe & Steve Ovett	Men's 1500 metres European record holder 27 August 1980 - 15 July 1985	Succeeded by Steve Cram
Awards and achievements
Preceded by Virginia Wade	BBC Sports Personality of the Year; 1978	Succeeded by Sebastian Coe
