= Didier Le Guillou =

French middle-distance runner

Personal information
- Born: 1 April 1960 (age 66) Enghien-les-Bains, France

Sport
- Sport: Track and field

Didier Le Guillou (born 1 April 1960) is a retired French middle-distance runner who competed primarily in the 800 metres.

He reached the semi-final at the 1982 European Championships and the heats at the 1983 World Championships. He became French indoor champion in 1983.

His personal best time was 1:46.36 minutes, achieved in July 1983 in Bordeaux.
