= Kenneth Hlasa =

Lesotho long-distance runner

Personal information
- Nationality: Lesotho
- Born: 2 March 1955 (age 71)

Sport
- Sport: Long-distance running
- Event: Marathon

Kenneth Hlasa (born 2 March 1955) is a Lesotho long-distance runner. He competed in the marathon and in the men's 800 metres at the 1980 Summer Olympics in Moscow.
