= Agberto Guimarães =

Brazilian middle-distance runner

Personal information
- Full name: Agberto João Conceição Guimarães
- Born: August 18, 1957 (age 68) Belém, Brazil
- Height: 1.75 m (5 ft 9 in)
- Weight: 57 kg (126 lb)

Sport
- Club: CPR
Medal record
Men's Athletics
Representing Brazil
Pan American Games
Gold medal – first place	1983 Caracas	800 metres
Gold medal – first place	1983 Caracas	1500 metres
Silver medal – second place	1983 Caracas	4x400 metre relay
Bronze medal – third place	1979 San Juan	800 metres
Bronze medal – third place	1979 San Juan	1500 metres

Agberto João Conceição Guimarães (born August 18, 1957) is a former Brazilian middle distance runner who competed at the international level in the 1980s. He set a personal best 800 metres time of 1:43.63 min in Koblenz 1984, a performance which made him temporarily the second-fastest South American 800m runner ever.

Guimarães first participated in major international championships at the 1980 Moscow Olympics where he placed fourth in 800 metres (see, for example, "Moscow Olympic Book" / Moskovan Olympiakirja, Tapio Pekola et al., eds., Helsinki, Finland: "Runner" / Juoksija magazine, 1980).

Guimarães came sixth in the 800 m final at the 1983 World Championships in Athletics in Helsinki. He won two gold medals and two bronze medals at the Pan American Games. Nowadays Guimarães works at the Brazilian Olympic Committee as its Olympic Solidarity Programme general manager.

== International competitions ==
Year	Competition	Venue	Position	Event	Notes
Representing Brazil
1975	South American Championships	Rio de Janeiro, Brazil	3rd	800 m	1:51.8
1977	Universiade	Sofia, Bulgaria	4th	800 m	1:46.0
1977	South American Championships	Montevideo, Uruguay	1st	800 m	1:52.4
1979	Pan American Games	San Juan, Puerto Rico	3rd	800 m	1:46.8
1979	Pan American Games	San Juan, Puerto Rico	3rd	1500 m	3:41.5
1979	World Cup	Montreal, Canada	5th	800 m	1:48.8^{1}
1979	Universiade	Mexico City, Mexico	6th (sf)	800 m	1:51.31^{2}
1979	Universiade	Mexico City, Mexico	6th	4 × 400 m relay	3:05.61
1980	Olympic Games	Moscow, Soviet Union	4th	800 m	1:46.2
1980	Olympic Games	Moscow, Soviet Union	5th	4 × 400 m relay	3:05.9
1981	South American Championships	La Paz, Bolivia	1st	4 × 400 m relay	3:09.5
1983	World Championships	Helsinki, Finland	6th	800 m	1:45.46
1983	World Championships	Helsinki, Finland	6th (sf)	4 × 400 m relay	3:04.46
1983	Pan American Games	Caracas, Venezuela	1st	800 m	1:46.31
1983	Pan American Games	Caracas, Venezuela	1st	1500 m	3:42.91
1983	Pan American Games	Caracas, Venezuela	2nd	4 × 400 m relay	3:02.79
1984	Olympic Games	Los Angeles, United States	12th (sf)	800 m	1:46.65
1984	Olympic Games	Los Angeles, United States	34th (h)	1500 m	3:49.26^{3}
1985	World Cup	Canberra, Australia	3rd	800 m	1:45.80^{1}
1988	Olympic Games	Seoul, South Korea	24th (h)	800 m	1:48.49
1989	World Indoor Championships	Budapest, Hungary	11th (h)	1500 m	3:44.86

^{1}Representing the Americas
^{2}Did not finish in the final
^{3}Did not finish in the semifinals
