= Sydney Maree =

South African–American athlete (born 1956)

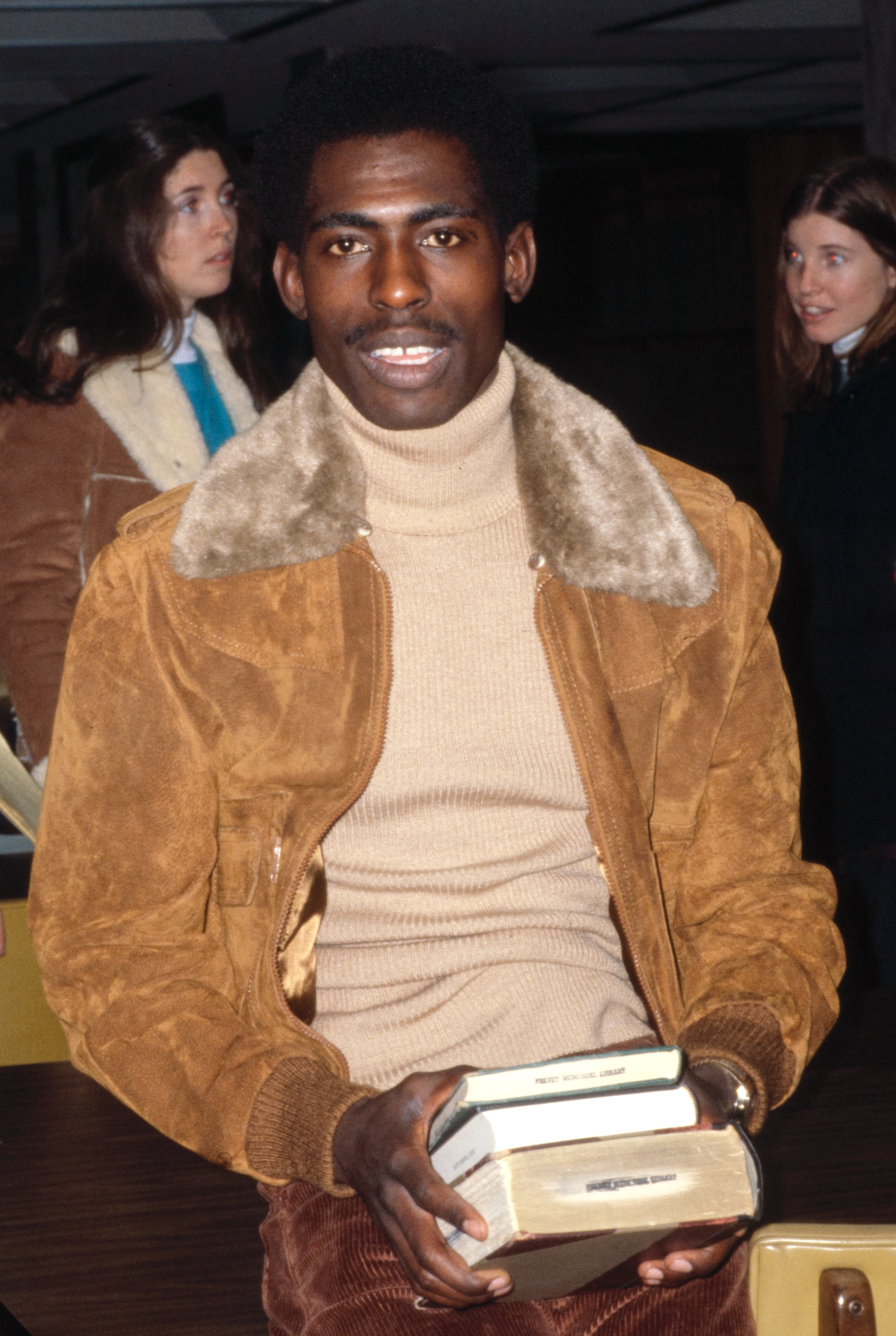
- Maree with schoolbooks at Villanova University, 1981

Personal information
- Nationality: South African-American
- Born: September 9, 1956 (age 70) Cullinan, South Africa

Sport
- Country: United States; South Africa
- Sport: Athletics/Track, Mid-distance running
- Events: 1500 meters, Mile, 5000 meters
- College team: Villanova Wildcats

Achievements and titles
- Personal bests: 1500 m: 3:29.77; Mile: 3:48.83; 3000 m: 7:33.37; 2-mile: 8:24.32; 5000 m: 13:01.15; 10,000 m: 28:21.46

Sydney Maree OIS (born September 9, 1956) is a former middle distance runner who competed at the international level in the 1980s. He was the first South African to run officially under 3:30 in the 1500m. He was born in Cullinan, South Africa, but later became a U.S. citizen, running for the United States in various competitions.

== Running career ==
Maree attended Villanova University, where he was eight-time NCAA All American, including once in cross country, thrice indoors, and four times outdoors; two-time NCAA champion in the 1500 meters (1980, 1981), distance medley relay (1980, 1981) and once in the 5000 meters (1979). He also won the inaugural Fifth Avenue Mile in 1981 with 3:47.52, which was the course record for 43 years until Josh Kerr ran 3:44.3 in 2024.

Maree's greatest success came in August 1983 when he broke Steve Ovett's world record over 1500 m at a meet in Cologne, clocking 3:31.24 min. Two years later, Maree set a new US record of 3:29.77 min; however, this was not a world record as a few weeks before Saïd Aouita had run 3:29.46. Maree was an excellent 5000-m runner, as well. In Oslo in 1985, he set a US record at 13:01.15 min. finishing just behind Aouita who set a world record.

Maree's personal bests include the aforementioned 3:29.77 for the 1500 meters (1985, the American Record for 20 years), 3:48.83 for the mile (1981), 4:54.20 in the 2000 meters (1985, then a US record), 7:33.37 for 3000 meters (1984, also then an American record), and the previously mentioned American record of 13:01.15 in the 5000 meters. He was USA's runner in the 5000 meters at the 1987 IAAF World Championships in Athletics (11th place) and the 1988 Olympic Games (where he finished in fifth place in the final).

== Personal life ==
Maree is married with five children. In 1995 he moved back to South Africa, later forming the asset management group Franklin Zamani, in Johannesburg, of which he became the CEO.

Records
Preceded by (United Kingdom) Steve Ovett	Men's 1,500m World Record Holder; August 28, 1983 – September 4, 1983	Succeeded by (United Kingdom) Steve Ovett
Sporting positions
Preceded by (Germany) Dieter Baumann	Men's 3,000m Best Year Performance; 1988	Succeeded by (Morocco) Saïd Aouita
