= Musa Luliga =

Tanzanian middle-distance runner

Personal information
- Nationality: Tanzanian
- Born: 24 September 1954 (age 71)

Sport
- Sport: Middle-distance running
- Event: 800 metres

Musa Luliga (born 24 September 1954) is a Tanzanian middle-distance runner. He competed in the men's 800 metres at the 1980 Summer Olympics.
