= David Warren (runner) =

British middle-distance runner

Dave Warren
Personal information
- Nationality: British (English)
- Born: 11 February 1956 (age 70) St. Pancras, London, England
- Height: 185 cm (6 ft 1 in)
- Weight: 73 kg (161 lb)

Sport
- Sport: Athletics
- Event: Middle-distance running
- Club: Epsom and Ewell Harriers

David Marlais Jenner Warren (born 11 February 1956) is a male retired British middle-distance runner who competed at the 1980 Summer Olympics, reaching the final.

== Biography ==
Warren competed for the Murray State Racers track and field team in the NCAA.

Warren was a member of Epsom and Ewell Harriers. He finished second behind Tom McLean in the 800 metres event at the 1978 AAA Championships. Shortly afterwards he represented England in the 800 metres event, at the 1978 Commonwealth Games in Edmonton, Alberta, Canada.

At the 1980 Olympics Games in Moscow, he represented Great Britain in the men's 800 metres.
