= Abebe Zerihun =

Ethiopian middle-distance runner

Personal information
- Nationality: Ethiopian
- Born: 18 February 1955 (age 71) Eritrea

Sport
- Sport: Middle-distance running
- Event: 800 metres
- Club: Air force

Abebe Zerihun (born 18 February 1955) is an Ethiopian middle-distance runner. He competed in the men's 800 metres at the 1980 Summer Olympics.
