= Peter Coe =

British athletics coach (1919–2008)

- Born: Percy Newbold Coe; 27 September 1919; Stepney, London, England
- Died: 9 August 2008 (aged 88); London, England
- Occupations: Athletics coach; author; translator
- Spouse: Tina Angela Lal (m. 1954; died 2005)
- Children: 5, including Sebastian

Percy Newbold "Peter" Coe (27 September 1919 – 9 August 2008) was a British athletics coach, author, translator and coach of his son Sebastian Coe.

== Early life and education ==
Coe was born Percy Newbold Coe in Stepney, the only child of carpenter and joiner Percy Coe (1893–1974), who had served with the East Surrey Regiment and East Kent Regiment during the First World War, and Violet, daughter of professional gambler and gymnast (part of a family music-hall tumbling act) Henry Brereton Newbold. Percy and Violet Coe were both of humble working-class origins; their grandson Sebastian Coe observed "my grandparents... barely had an education at all." Violet was from a Cockney family, and worked as a charwoman for a family in Fulham; when her employer, Gladys Minson, suggested she move closer- the Coes were then living in "one room in Whitechapel"- to reduce the daily commute, and the family's straitened circumstances were made evident, the Minson family bought the house next door and gave it to the Coes outright. They lived there for the rest of their lives. Coe had a younger brother, Peter, who died in infancy in 1928, and he took on his brother's first name as a dedication to him. He was brought up in just two rooms on Cambridge Heath Road. Although he won a scholarship to Westminster School, going there from a West London comprehensive school was a culture shock for Coe, and he shortly left after having been offered a similar scholarship for the Emanuel School in Battersea.

== Career ==
Coe served in the merchant navy at the age of 19, during the Second World War. He was on board a Canadian vessel, the A.D. Huff when it was torpedoed by the German battle cruiser Gneisenau on 22 February 1941; he later claimed to be one of only five survivors. He was picked up by a German boat, and was made to work in the kitchens, because he spoke fluent German. He was to be transferred to a prisoner-of-war camp, but escaped by jumping off a train, along with a Canadian prisoner. He then walked all the way from Germany to Spain where he was imprisoned for six months.

After the war, while Sebastian was still young, the family moved up to Sheffield from Middlesex, and he worked there as a production engineer in a steel cutlery factory, George Butler & Co., eventually becoming production manager. He did not begin coaching Seb until just before he turned 50, his favourite sport being cycling rather than athletics.

As an engineer, Coe became dissatisfied with the athletics coaching offered to his son Sebastian at his first club, Hallamshire Harriers. This training was based on the principles propounded by the New Zealand coach Arthur Lydiard, and involved a substantial amount of long-distance running. By contrast, Coe took the view that "long slow training turned you into a long slow runner", and adopted a system of speed-endurance training involving fast repetitions with short recoveries, based on the ideas of the German coach Woldemar Gerschler. He used his fluency in German to translate many East German books on training. Much of his training was also based on self-taught biomechanics, from his background as an engineer. In addition to coaching his son Sebastian, Peter Coe also coached Wendy Smith-Sly, who placed second in the 3000 metres at the 1984 Summer Olympics. He would often refer to himself as Sebastian Coe's coach rather than his father.

== Personal life ==
Coe's first marriage ended in divorce, and in 1954 he married Tina Angela Lal, with whom he had four children including Sebastian Coe. Coe's second wife, and mother of four of his five children, Tina Angela Coe (née Lal), died in Hammersmith and Fulham, London, in 2005, aged 75. Tina Angela's sister Sheila Lal was married to Indian diplomat Samar Sen.

Peter Coe died in 2008, aged 88. He and his son Sebastian remained close up until his death, speaking almost every day on the phone. Previously they had co-written two books on athletics coaching together.

He was posthumously inducted into the England Athletics Hall of Fame in 2015.

== Publications ==
- Winning Running: Successful 800m & 1500m Racing and Training. Peter Coe, Trafalgar Square Publishing, ISBN 1-85223-997-2
- Better Training for Distance Runners. David E. Martin, Peter N. Coe, Human Kinetics Publishers, ISBN 0-88011-530-0
