= David Moorcroft =

Athlete with world records in middle and long distance running

David Moorcroft OBE DL
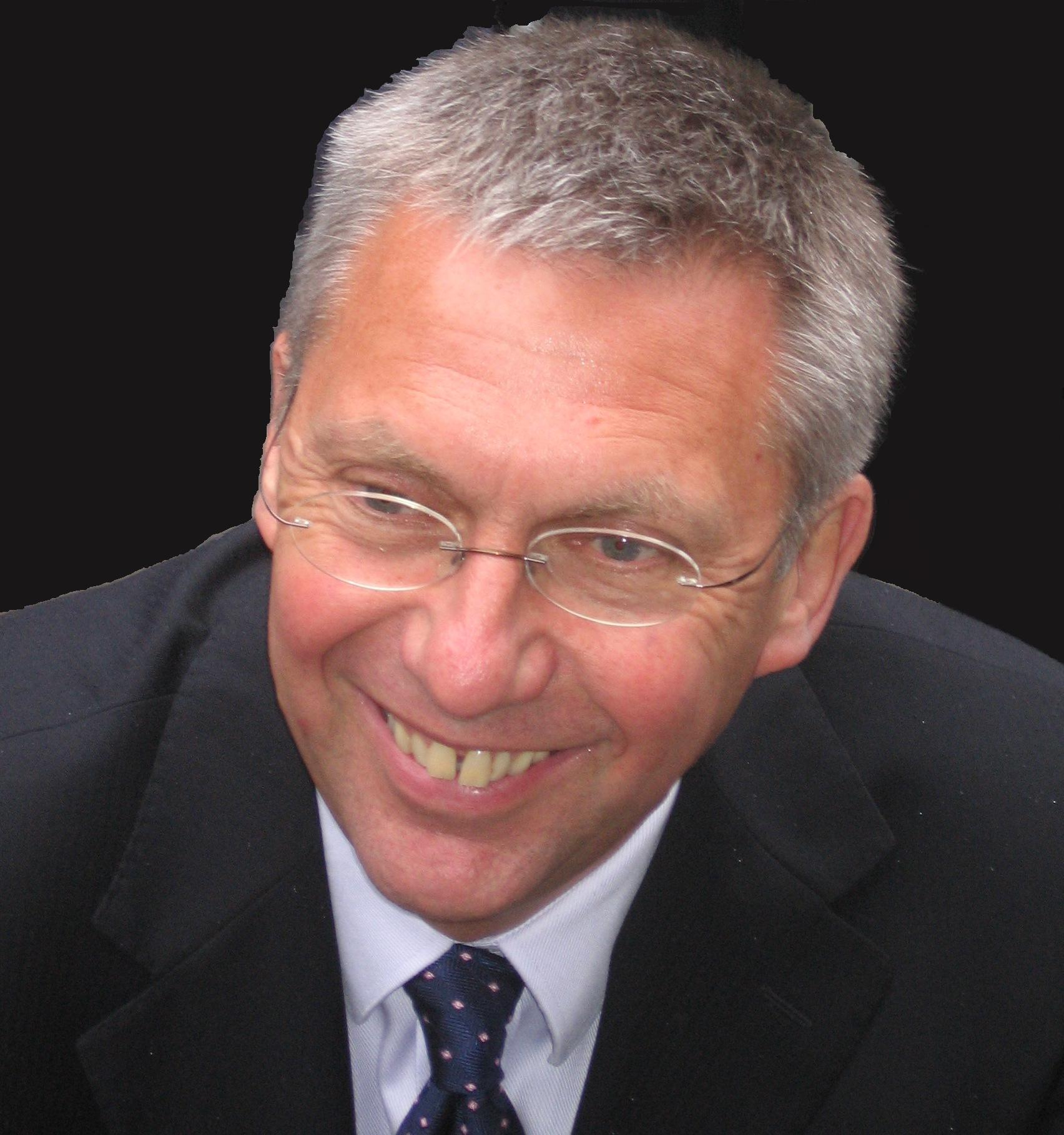
- at Coventry walk of fame unveiling 16 May 2008

Personal information
- Born: 10 April 1953 (age 73) Coventry, England
- Occupation: Former Chief Executive of UK Athletics
- Height: 180 cm (5 ft 11 in)
- Weight: 66 kg (146 lb)
- Spouse: Linda

Sport
- Sport: Athletics
- Event: middle-distance
- Club: Coventry Godiva Harriers
Medal record
Men's athletics
Representing Great Britain
European Championships
Bronze medal – third place	1978 Prague	1500 m
Bronze medal – third place	1982 Athens	5000 m

David Robert Moorcroft OBE DL (born 10 April 1953) is a former middle-distance and long-distance runner from England, and former world record holder for 5,000 metres. His athletic career spanned the late-1970s and 1980s. He subsequently served as the Chief Executive of UK Athletics from 1997 to 2007. He was appointed a Member of the Order of the British Empire (MBE) in 1983 and promoted to an Officer (OBE) in 1999, in both cases for services to athletics. In March 2023, he was appointed a Deputy lieutenant of the West Midlands.

== Early life ==
Moorcroft was born to Robert and Mildred (née Hardy) Moorcroft on 10 April 1953 in Coventry, Warwickshire and he has an elder sister Valerie. He was a pupil at Woodlands Comprehensive School and Tile Hill College. He studied Physical Education and Sport Science at Loughborough University. In 1997 he received an honorary degree of Doctor of Technology from Loughborough University. He has been a member of the Coventry Godiva Harriers athletics club since 1964 and was previously the club's president.

== Running ==
Moorcroft made his senior debut for Great Britain in 1973 and competed in his first Olympic Games in Montreal 1976, placing seventh in the 1,500-metre final. He won gold in the 1978 Commonwealth Games in Edmonton at 1500 metres. Just four weeks later, he won the bronze medal at the same distance in the European Athletics Championships in Prague. In the 1980 Moscow Olympics, he suffered from stomach problems and was eliminated in the 5,000-metres semifinals.

Moorcroft had a remarkable season in 1982, where he broke the 5,000 m World Record by 5.79 seconds (without the use of pace-making). His time of 13:00.41 set at the Bislett Games in Oslo stood for three years until broken by Saïd Aouita (though it remained a British record until 2010 and a European record until 1997). He remains the last non-African to set a 5,000 m world record. In the 1982 running season, he set a personal record in most distances, but probably ran too many races or for some other reason lost his peak shape before the European Athletics Championships in Athens. There he took the bronze medal at 5,000 metres, losing to West Germany's Thomas Wessinghage and East Germany's Werner Schildhauer.

The same year, he won gold in the 1982 Commonwealth Games in Brisbane over 5,000 m, he broke the European and British 3,000 m record with a time of 7:32.79 (less than a second off Henry Rono's 7:32.1 world record) and he demonstrated his lower end range by recording 1:46.64 for 800 m and 3:49.34 for the mile. His 3,000 m time remained a British record until it was broken by Mo Farah on 5 June 2016.

He competed in his third and final Olympic Games in Los Angeles in 1984, however, suffering from a groin injury, he placed only 14th in the 5,000 metres final. He continued to compete for Britain internationally until the late 1980s.

Following his retirement from top-level competition, he continued running and his time of 4:02.53 over a mile in Belfast in 1993 was at the time a world masters record for the 40+ age group.

== Broadcasting and charity work ==
Moorcroft covered athletics events for BBC television and radio between 1983 and 1997 and at the same time, he was developing the Coventry Sports Foundation for which he was Chief Executive from 1981 to 1995 (and remains a Trustee)..

For the 2008 Beijing Summer Olympics, Moorcroft provided track and field analysis for the Canadian Broadcasting Corporation. He commentated for Channel 4 at the 2011 World Athletics Championships. During the 2012 London Olympics he again served as a track and field analyst for Canadian television, this time for the CTV-led Olympic Broadcast Media Consortium. In 2016, he performed the same role for CBC/Radio-Canada's coverage of the Rio de Janeiro Olympic Games. He will again be providing athletics colour commentary with CBC's broadcasting team for the Paris 2024 Summer Olympic Games.

Moorcroft is Chair of the parkrun UK Board

== UK Athletics ==
He was appointed as Chief Executive of the British Athletic Federation in 1997 at a time when the finances of athletics in the UK were perilous. Indeed, two weeks later the federation was placed into administration, leading to the creation of a successor body: UK Athletics. He remained Chief Executive until January 2007 – having announced his decision to resign in August 2006.

Under his leadership, the federation rebuilt financially through a combination of sponsorship, broadcasting and public funds. On his departure UK Athletics' turnover was over £18 million per annum. One of his final acts as Chief Executive was helping to secure a £50 million investment from Norwich Union into athletics at all levels up to 2012. A new television deal was agreed which brought athletics back to the BBC and a series of televised events staged across the UK each year. The IAAF World Indoor Championships in Birmingham and the EAA European Cross Country Championships in Edinburgh were held in 2003, and the rights were secured to stage the 2007 EAA European Indoor Championships in Birmingham, the 2008 IAAF World Cross Country Championships in Edinburgh and the 2007 EAA European Cup of Race Walking in Leamington Spa.

A network of new indoor training facilities were developed across the UK and a major refurbishment investment of English tracks took place, funded by the £41 million 'Legacy Fund' granted to athletics by the Government following the cancellation of the 2005 World Championships in London.

On the track, the British team had mixed fortunes. At the Olympic Games in 2000 and 2004, five gold medals were won – comparing favourably with a total of two golds in the previous three Games. However, the results in World and European Championships declined. On leaving UK Athletics, he pointed to positive signs with a new generation of athletes who were building towards London 2012.

== Personal life ==
Moorcroft married Linda on 5 July 1975. They have two children, Paul and Lucy, and four grandchildren.

Records
Preceded by Henry Rono	Men's 5000 m World Record Holder; 7 July 1982 – 22 July 1985	Succeeded by Saïd Aouita
Sporting positions
Preceded by Steve Scott	Men's 3,000 m Best Year Performance; 1982	Succeeded by Doug Padilla
Preceded by Henry Rono	Men's 5,000 m Best Year Performance; 1982	Succeeded by Fernando Mamede
