= Jorma Härkönen =

Finnish middle-distance runner

Personal information
- Born: 17 May 1956 (age 70)
Medal record
Men's athletics
Representing Finland
European Championships
Bronze medal – third place	1982 Athens	800 m

Jorma Kalevi Härkönen (born 17 May 1956 in Saari) is a retired middle distance runner from Finland. He is best known for winning the bronze medal at the 1982 European Championships in Athens, Greece.
