= Willi Wülbeck =

German middle-distance runner

Personal information
- Full name: Wilhelm Wülbeck
- Born: 18 December 1954 (age 71) Oberhausen, West Germany
- Height: 186 cm (6 ft 1 in)
- Weight: 69 kg (152 lb)

Sport
- Sport: Athletics
- Event(s): 800 m, 1500 m, mile
- Club: SC Rot-Weiß Oberhausen; SG Osterfeld Oberhausen; TV Wattenscheid

Achievements and titles
- Personal best(s): 800 m – 1:43.65 (1983); 1500 m – 3:33.74 (1980); Mile – 3:56.38 (1979)
Medal record
Representing West Germany
World Championships
Gold medal – first place	1983 Helsinki	800 m
IAAF World Cup
Bronze medal – third place	1977 Düsseldorf	800 m
Bronze medal – third place	1979 Montreal	800 m

Wilhelm "Willi" Wülbeck (born 18 December 1954) is a retired German middle-distance runner. Competing in the 800 m he finished fourth at the 1976 Summer Olympics. He missed the 1980 Moscow Olympics due to the West German boycott and could not participate in the 1984 Summer Olympics because of an injury. He also finished eighth at the 1974 and 1982 European Championships.

His greatest success came as he won the gold medal at the 1983 World Championships in Helsinki. Wülbeck ran a time of 1:43.65 which remains the German record. In the 1500 metres his personal best time was 3:33.74 minutes, achieved in August 1980 in Koblenz. This result places him seventh on the German all-time performers list.

Wülbeck won ten consecutive West German championships over 800 m (1974–1983), an unprecedented achievement. He received multiple national awards, including the Silver Bay Leaf in 1980, the Rudolf Harbig Memorial Award in 1984, and the Sports Badge of North Rhine Westphalia in 1983. In 2002 he was an ambassador for the unsuccessful German 2012 Olympic bid.

Wülbeck studied biology and sports and after retiring from competitions become a sports teacher. He later worked as a public relation consultant for a sporting goods enterprise and as a freelance sports journalist. He also founded a sports school and a public relations agency in Duisburg. From 1992 to 2006 he headed the athletics department at ASV Duisburg.
