= Peter Pearless =

New Zealand middle-distance runner

Personal information
- Nationality: New Zealand
- Born: 4 June 1957 (age 69)

Sport
- Sport: Middle-distance running
- Event: 800 metres

Peter Pearless (born 4 June 1957) is a New Zealand middle-distance runner. He competed in the men's 800 metres at the 1984 Summer Olympics.
