= Roger Milhau =

French middle-distance runner

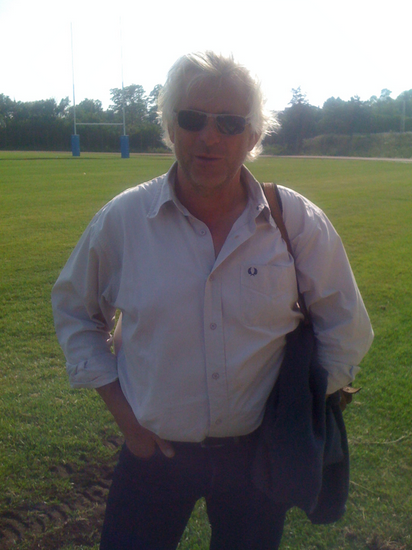
- 2013

Personal information
- Born: 29 March 1955 (age 71) Istres, France
- Height: 175 cm (5 ft 9 in)
- Weight: 80 kg (176 lb)

Sport
- Country: France
- Sport: Athletics (track and field)
Medal record
Men's athletics
Representing France
European Indoor Championships
Gold medal – first place	1980 Sindelfingen	800 m
Bronze medal – third place	1978 Milan	800 m

Roger Milhau (born 29 March 1955) is a retired French middle-distance runner who competed primarily in the 800 metres.

He was born in Istres. He won the bronze medal at the 1978 European Indoor Championships and the gold medal at the 1980 European Indoor Championships. He reached the semi-finals at the 1978 European Championships and the 1980 Olympic Games.

He became French champion in 1978, 1979 and 1980; and French indoor champion in 1978, 1979 and 1982.

His personal best time was 1:45.98 minutes, achieved in July 1980 in Saint-Maur.
