= Hans-Peter Ferner =

German middle-distance runner

Personal information
- Born: 6 June 1956 (age 70) Neuburg an der Donau, Bavaria

Sport
- Sport: Track and field
Medal record
Representing West Germany
European Championships
Gold medal – first place	1982 Athens	800 m
Summer Universiade
Bronze medal – third place	1979 Mexico City	800 m

Hans-Peter Ferner (born 6 June 1956) is a West German former middle-distance runner who won the gold medal over 800 m at the 1982 European Championships in Athletics in Athens where he unexpectedly defeated world-record holder Sebastian Coe. Those were Ferner's second and last European Athletics Championships, because he had competed already in the 1978 European Championships in Prague, where he had been eliminated in the 800-metre heats or semifinals. Coe had suffered from injuries and a glandular sickness which made him underachieve in Athens.

== Biography ==
Ferner missed the 1980 Moscow Olympics because West Germany participated in the United States-led boycott. Ferner's surprising European Championship at 800 metres in 1982 was his only major international victory, because he finished seventh in the 800 m final at the 1983 World Championships in Athletics in Helsinki. At the 1984 Summer Olympics in Los Angeles he was eliminated in the 800-metre semifinals. After ending his competitive running career, Ferner has worked as a businessman - he was an engineering student while running 800 metres (a Finnish sports journalist's television commentary in the late 1980s or 1990s).
