= Anatoliy Reshetnyak =

Ukrainian athlete

Anatoliy Reshetnyak Anatolii Reshetniak
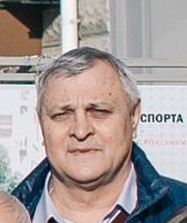

Personal information
- Full name: Anatoliy Volodymyrovych Reshetnyak
- Nationality: Ukrainian
- Born: 14 April 1955 (age 71) Yevpatoria, Soviet Union

Sport
- Sport: Middle-distance running
- Event: 800 metres

Anatoliy Volodymyrovych Reshetnyak or Anatolii Reshetniak (born 14 April 1955) is a Ukrainian middle-distance runner. He competed in the men's 800 metres at the 1980 Summer Olympics, representing the Soviet Union.
