= Sebastian Coe =

British athlete and politician (born 1956)

The Right Honourable The Lord Coe CH KBE Hon FRIBA OLY
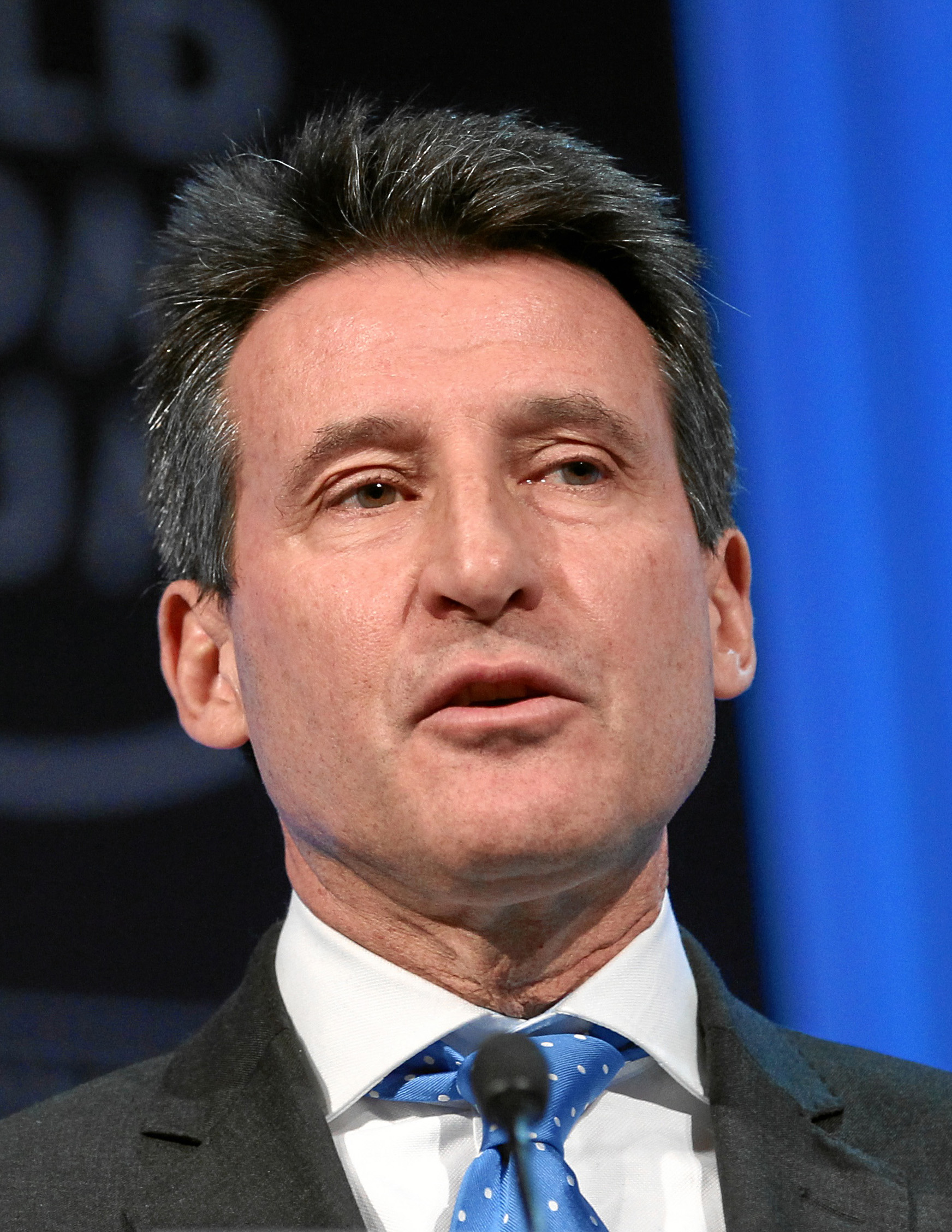
- Coe during the World Economic Forum in Davos, Switzerland, in 2012

President of World Athletics
- Incumbent
- Assumed office 19 August 2015
- Preceded by: Lamine Diack

Chairman of the British Olympic Association
- In office 7 November 2012 – 24 November 2016
- President: The Princess Royal
- Preceded by: The Lord Moynihan
- Succeeded by: Sir Hugh Robertson

Chairman of the London Organising Committee of the Olympic and Paralympic Games
- In office 24 August 2008 – 12 August 2012
- IOC President: Jacques Rogge
- Preceded by: Liu Qi
- Succeeded by: Carlos Arthur Nuzman

Chair of the London Organising Committee of the Olympic and Paralympic Games
- In office 7 October 2005 – 30 May 2013; Chair of the London bid: 18 May 2004 – 7 October 2005
- Preceded by: Barbara Cassani
- Succeeded by: Position abolished

Chief of Staff to the Leader of the Opposition
- In office 19 June 1997 – 13 September 2001
- Leader: William Hague
- Preceded by: Jonathan Powell
- Succeeded by: Jenny Ungless

Member of the House of Lords
- Lord Temporal
- Life peerage 16 May 2000 – 31 January 2022

Member of Parliament for Falmouth and Camborne
- In office 9 April 1992 – 8 April 1997
- Preceded by: David Mudd
- Succeeded by: Candy Atherton

Personal details
- Born: Sebastian Newbold Coe; 29 September 1956 (age 70) Hammersmith, London, England
- Party: Conservative
- Spouses: Nicky McIrvine (m. 1990; div. 2002) Carole Annett (m. 2011)
- Children: 4
- Parent: Peter Coe (father)
- Education: Loughborough University
- Sports career
- Height: 5 ft 9 in (175 cm)
- Weight: 119 lb (54 kg)
- Sport: Athletics/Track, Mid-distance running
- Events: 800 metres, 1500 metres, Mile
- Team: Hallamshire Harriers, Sheffield; Haringey AC, London

Sports achievements and titles
- Personal bests: 400 m: 46.87 (London 1979); 800 m: 1:41.73 NR (Florence 1981); 1000 m: 2:12.18 AR (Oslo 1981); 1500 m: 3:29.77 (Rieti 1986); Mile: 3:47.33 (Brussels 1981); 2000 m: 4:58.84 (Bordeaux 1982); 3000 m: 7:54.33 (Cosford 1987)
Medal record
Representing Great Britain
Men's athletics
Olympic Games
Gold medal – first place	1980 Moscow	1500 m
Gold medal – first place	1984 Los Angeles	1500 m
Silver medal – second place	1980 Moscow	800 m
Silver medal – second place	1984 Los Angeles	800 m
European Championships
Gold medal – first place	1986 Stuttgart	800 m
Silver medal – second place	1982 Athens	800 m
Silver medal – second place	1986 Stuttgart	1500 m
Bronze medal – third place	1978 Prague	800 m
European Indoor Championships
Gold medal – first place	1977 San Sebastián	800 m
Representing Europe
World Cup
Gold medal – first place	1981 Rome	800 m
Silver medal – second place	1989 Barcelona	1500 m

Coe's voice
from the BBC programme Desert Island Discs, 13 December 2009

Sebastian Newbold Coe, Baron Coe (born 29 September 1956), often referred to as Seb Coe, is a British sports administrator, former politician and retired track and field athlete. As a middle-distance runner, Coe won four Olympic medals, including 1500 metres gold medals at the Olympic Games in 1980 and 1984. He set nine outdoor and three indoor world records in middle-distance track events – including, in 1979, setting three world records over the course of 41 days – and the world record he set in the 800 metres in 1981 remained unbroken until 1997. Coe's rivalries with fellow Britons Steve Ovett and Steve Cram dominated middle-distance racing for much of the 1980s.

Following Coe's retirement from athletics, he was a Conservative member of parliament from 1992 to 1997 for Falmouth and Camborne in Cornwall, and became a Life Peer on 16 May 2000.

Coe headed the successful London 2012 Olympic bid for the 2012 Summer Olympics and became chairman of the London Organising Committee for the Olympic Games. In 2007, he was elected a vice-president of the International Association of Athletics Federations (IAAF), and re-elected for another four-year term in 2011. In August 2015, he was elected president of the IAAF.

In 2012, Coe was appointed Pro-Chancellor of Loughborough University where he had been an undergraduate. Subsequently, in 2017, he was appointed as Chancellor. He is also a member of Loughborough University's governing body. He was one of 24 athletes inducted as inaugural members of the IAAF Hall of Fame. In November 2012, he was appointed chairman of the British Olympic Association. Coe was presented with the Lifetime Achievement award at the BBC Sports Personality of the Year in December 2012.

== Early life and education ==
Coe was born on 29 September 1956 at Queen Charlotte's and Chelsea Hospital, Hammersmith, London. His father was athletics coach Peter Coe and his mother, Tina Angela Lal, was of half Indian descent, born to a Punjabi father, Sardari Lal Malhotra, and an English/Irish mother, Vera (née Swan). Indian diplomat Samar Sen was Sebastian's uncle.

When he was less than a year old, Coe and his family moved to Warwickshire, where he later attended Bridgetown Primary School and Hugh Clopton Secondary School in Stratford-upon-Avon. The family then moved to Sheffield where he attended Tapton School, a a secondary modern school, at Crosspool which became a comprehensive school while he was there and Abbeydale Grange School. He joined Hallamshire Harriers at the age of 12, and soon became a middle-distance specialist, having been inspired by David Jackson, a geography teacher at Tapton School who had been a cross-country runner. Coe was coached by his own father and represented Loughborough University and later Haringey AC, now Enfield and Haringey Athletic Club when not competing for his country.

Coe studied Economics and Social History at Loughborough University, where he met George Gandy, the university's strength and conditioning coach, whose already well-established exercises for Loughborough Students RUFC strengthened and conditioned Coe. Coe won his first major race at the 1977 European indoor championships 800 metres in San Sebastián, Spain.

His mother, Tina Angela Lal, died in London, in 2005, aged 75. His father, Peter Coe, died on 9 August 2008, aged 88, while Coe was visiting Beijing.

== Athletics career ==
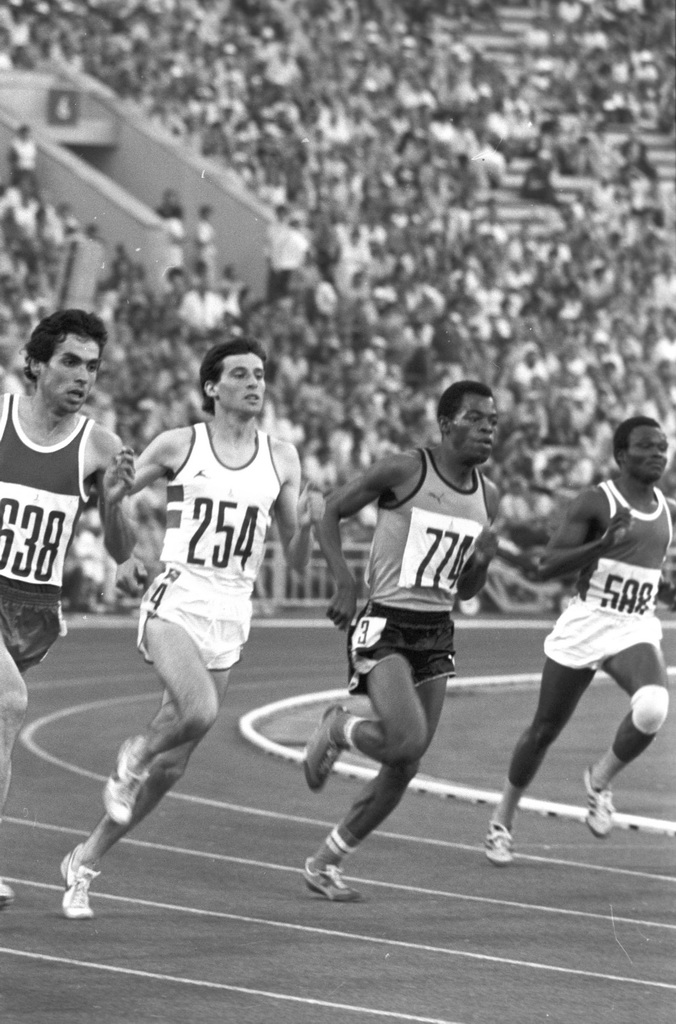
Sebastian Coe (#254) was the silver medallist in men's 800 m at the 1980 Olympics in Moscow.

Coe first caught the public's attention on 14 March 1977 when he competed in the 800 m at the European Indoor Championships in San Sebastián, front-running the entire race and winning in 1:46.54, just short of the world indoor record. He ran in the Emsley Carr mile on 29 August 1977, outsprinting Filbert Bayi of Tanzania in the home straight and winning in 3:57.7. Eleven days later, on 9 September 1977, he ran the 800 m at the Coca-Cola Games at Crystal Palace in a time of 1:44.95, beating Andy Carter's 1:45.12 to claim his first UK national outdoor record.

Coe's 1978 season continued to show his progression in the middle distances, though he raced only sparingly, as in early June he had suffered a serious ankle injury whilst out on a training run. On 18 August 1978, he ran the 800 m at the Ivo Van Damme Memorial meeting in Brussels, where he outclassed the field in a time of 1:44.25, another UK national record.

He first ran against his great rival Steve Ovett in a schools cross country race in 1972. Neither won, nor did either win in their first major encounter, on 31 August 1978, in the 800 m at the European Championships in Prague. Ovett took second, breaking Coe's UK record with a time of 1:44.09, and Coe finished third; the race was won by the East German Olaf Beyer. According to Pat Butcher, Coe's father and coach Peter Coe had encouraged him to run as fast as he could from the start. The early pace was indeed exceptionally fast: Coe ran 200 m in 24.3, 400 m in 49.32, and 600 m in 1:16.2; he then slowed and finished third in 1:44.76. A few weeks later, Coe reclaimed the UK record at Crystal Palace, setting an all-comers' mark of 1:43.97 which ranked him second in the world that year. On 1 October 1978, Coe displayed to the world for the first time his phenomenal natural endurance by winning the Loughrea 4-Mile road race in Ireland in 17:54, defeating the likes of Eamonn Coghlan (who would win the 5000 m at the 1983 World Championships) and Mike McLeod (who would be the 1984 Olympic 10,000 m silver medalist), and breaking Brendan Foster's course record of 18:05.

The next year, 1979, Coe set three world records in 41 days. He set the first two in Oslo, Norway, at 800 m (1:42.33) and the mile (3:48.95), then broke the world 1500 m record with his 3:32.03 in Zurich, Switzerland, becoming the first person to hold these three records at the same time. He easily won the 800 m at the European Cup in Turin in August, covering the last 200 m in 24.1, and anchored the British 4 × 400 m relay team with the quartet's fastest split, 45.5. He was voted Athlete of the Year by Athletics Weekly and Track and Field News and was ranked number one in the world at 800 m and 1500 m; no other athlete since has ranked number one at these distances in the same year.

In 1980, Coe broke Rick Wohlhuter's world record for 1000 m with a time of 2:13.40. He held all four middle-distance world records—the 800 m, 1000 m, 1500 m, and mile—simultaneously (another unique feat) for one hour until Ovett broke his mile record. In the 1980 Olympics in Moscow, Ovett and Coe each won the other's speciality: Ovett the 800 m and Coe the 1500 m. Coe took second in the 800 m after running what he described as "the worst tactical race of my life", while Ovett took third in the 1500. It was Ovett's first defeat at one mile or 1500 m in three years and 45 races. Coe covered the last 400 m in 52.2 and the last 100 m in 12.1 seconds, the fastest-ever finish in a championship final at this distance.

Coe began 1981 with an indoor world record of 1:46.0 for 800 m at Cosford in February. On 10 June, he set a world 800 m record in Florence; his 1:41.73 remained unbeaten until August 1997. As of 2025, his time still stands as the UK record and puts him in a tie with Nijel Amos for the eighth fastest man ever at the distance (Only bettered by David Rudisha, Wilson Kipketer, Djamel Sedjati, Emmanuel Wanyonyi, Marco Arop, Gabriel Tual, and Bryce Hoppel). A month later he set another world record with 2:12.18 for 1000 m, which was to last 19 years and to this day (2025) has only been bettered once. At this time, Coe was more than 1.7 seconds (about 14m) faster than anyone in history at both distances. Between these two record-breaking runs he won the Europa Cup 800 m semifinal, running the last 100 m in 11.3 (the fastest final 100 m ever recorded in a major international race), and achieved a personal best of 3:31.95 at 1500 m, despite poor pacemaking (he went through 400 m in 52.4 and 800 m in 1:49.1, the fastest start ever in an international 1500 m race at the time) by US 800 m runner James Robinson, who passed 400 m in 51.5. In August, Coe won the gold medal over 800 m at the European Cup final with a blistering last 200 m in 24.6 and last 100 m in 11.9. He then bettered the standard for the mile twice, first with 3:48.53 in Zürich and then with 3:47.33 in Brussels, on either side of Ovett's world record in Koblenz (3:48.40). His 3:47.33 remained on the all-time top-10 list until 31 May 2014.

Coe ended the season with gold over 800 m at the World Cup in Rome in September with 1:46.16 (and a 12.0 last 100 m), and remained undefeated at both 1500 m/mile and 800 m for the entire season, as he had in 1979. Track & Field News and Athletics Weekly magazines voted Coe Athlete of the Year, an honour he had also won in 1979. Although he had a short season in 1982 because of injuries in June and July, Coe still managed to rank number one in the world in the 800 m and to participate in a world-record 4 × 800 m relay. Coe, Peter Elliott, Garry Cook and Steve Cram ran a time of 7:03.89, which would remain the world record for 24 years. Coe's leg was the fastest of the day, a solo 1:44.01. Heavily favoured for the 800 m at the 1982 European Championships in Athletics in Athens, he unexpectedly finished second; the next day British team doctors revealed that he had been suffering from glandular fever. Coe decided to withdraw from the 1500 metres in those championships.

Coe began 1983 with world indoor records at 800 m in Cosford, England (1:44.91, breaking his own 1:46.0 from 1981) and 1000 m (2:18.58) in Oslo, but he spent much of that year battling health problems, including a prolonged bout with toxoplasmosis. He missed the inaugural IAAF World Championships in Athletics. The disease was severe, and he spent several months in and out of hospital. He returned to competition in 1984 and was selected at 800 m and 1500 m for the 1984 Olympic Games in Los Angeles, despite having been narrowly beaten by Peter Elliott in the AAA Championships. In the 800 m he took silver behind Joaquim Cruz of Brazil, but in the 1500 m final—his seventh race in nine days—he took the gold in an Olympic record of 3:32.53. He ran the last 800 m of the race in 1:49.8, the last lap in 53.2, and the last 100 m in 12.7. He remains the only man to win successive Olympic 1500 m titles.

Coe had planned to have a somewhat quiet season in 1985, partly because of the intensity of the previous year's efforts to get himself ready in time for the Olympics, as well as a planned move up to 5000 m, which never materialised. He suffered a recurrence of a back problem which had plagued him intermittently since 1980; this caused him to miss several weeks of midseason training. He nevertheless managed to run some fast times towards the end of the season, but he lost his mile world record to Cram, who beat him in Oslo. In 1986, Coe won the 800 m gold medal at the European Championships in Stuttgart, beating Tom McKean and Cram with a stunning last 200 m of 24.8 and 100 m of 12.4. It was his only 800 m title at an international championship. He took the silver in the 1500 m behind Cram, the mile world record holder proving too strong in the homestretch. He then ran his personal best over 1500 m with a 3:29.77 performance in Rieti, Italy, becoming the fourth man in history to break 3:30 at the distance. For the fourth year in his career (1979, 1981, 1982 & 1986), he was ranked No. 1 in the world at 800 m, and he was in the top two for 1500 m for the fifth time.

Coe sustained a foot injury in 1987 after winning an 800 m and running a 4 × 400 m leg for his club, Haringey, and was out for the entire season. The following year he was not selected for the British 1988 Olympic Games team after he failed to advance from the heats of the 1500 m at the Trials in Birmingham. He had shown good early season form, but he picked up a chest infection after a spell of altitude training. The Daily Mirror ran a campaign and the president of the International Olympic Committee, Juan Antonio Samaranch, unsuccessfully tried to have the rules changed in Coe's favour. It was said that India was willing to include him on its national team on account of his mother's Indian heritage.

Coe had a final good season in 1989, when, in his 33rd year (at age 32), he won the AAA 1500 m title, was ranked British number one for both 800 m and 1500 m, ran the world's second-fastest 800 m of the year (1:43.38), and took the silver medal at the World Cup over 1500 m. His final race was placing 6th in a time of 1:47.24 in the 800m at the 1990 Commonwealth Games in Auckland, New Zealand in February 1990. He was unable to start the 1500m race with yet another chest infection and from retired from competitive athletics.

== Trinity College's Great Court Run ==
A scene in the 1981 film Chariots of Fire recreates a race in which competitors attempt to run round the perimeter of the Great Court at Trinity College, Cambridge in the time it takes the clock to double-strike the hour at midday or midnight. Many have tried to run the 367 metres (401 yards) around the court in the 43.6 seconds that it takes to strike 12 o'clock. Known as the Great Court Run, students traditionally attempt to complete the circuit on the evening of the matriculation dinner. The only persons recognised to have actually completed the run in time are David Cecil in 1927 and Sam Dobin in 2007. It was thought that Coe had succeeded when he beat Steve Cram in a charity race in October 1988 in a time of 42.53 seconds. A video of the race, however, apparently shows that Coe was 12 metres short of the finish line when the last chime sounded, so Trinity College never officially accepted his time.

== Political career ==
Coe was elected as Member of Parliament for Falmouth and Camborne in 1992, for the Conservative Party, but lost his seat in the 1997 general election. He returned to politics for a short time as Leader of the Opposition William Hague's chief of staff, having accepted the offer of a Life Peerage on 16 May 2000.

== Controversies ==
Coe served as a Chairman of the London 2012 Bid Committee, and also as a Chairman of the London Organising Committee for the Olympic Games. Throughout and following the bidding process, some critics accused Coe of compromising the integrity of London's 2012 bid through aggressive tactics and alleged backroom deals. They argued that his forceful lobbying overshadowed the need for transparency and accountability, suggesting his drive to win came at the cost of ethical standards.

Coe's election as International Association of Athletics Federations (IAAF) President was marked by allegations of his ties to Papa Massata Diack, the son of former IAAF President Lamine Diack, who was at the center of a corruption, extortion and doping scandal, and was sentenced to prison as a result. Text messages indicated that Diack Jr. played a role in securing votes for Coe, providing insider information and support during the election. Diack Jr. said Coe would not have become IAAF president without his help. Coe distanced himself from the Diack family following his election.

Coe has faced criticism for his stance on Russian and Belarusian athletes in the aftermath of the Russian doping scandal and the state's invasion of Ukraine. Defending World Athletics' ban, Coe emphasized that he could not remain neutral in the matter. This position has been challenged by Russian officials, including Russian Olympic Committee President Stanislav Pozdnyakov, who accused Coe of pursuing a "Russophobic" agenda. World Athletics rejected the International Olympic Committee’s recommendations for Russian and Belarusian athletes to return to competitions as individual neutrals under certain conditions.

Conversely, Coe faced allegations of misleading a UK parliamentary committee regarding the timing and extent to which he was aware of the doping and corruption issues within the IAAF. Evidence showed that Coe received an email detailing the corruption and extortion claims months before a German television documentary exposed the scandal. He was also accused of blocking the release of a report from the University of Tübingen with the extent of doping.

In May 2024 World Athletics announced it would become the first sport to offer $50,000 in prize money for its Olympic champions. The announcement was met with criticism from several IOC members, and leaders of other international sports federations, which accused Coe of failing to consult them prior to the move. In May 2024, then-IOC President Thomas Bach suggested that instead of offering prize money for Olympic gold medalists in Paris, World Athletics should focus its funding on supporting athletes at the other end of the spectrum.

== Sports administration career ==
=== London 2012 Olympic Games ===
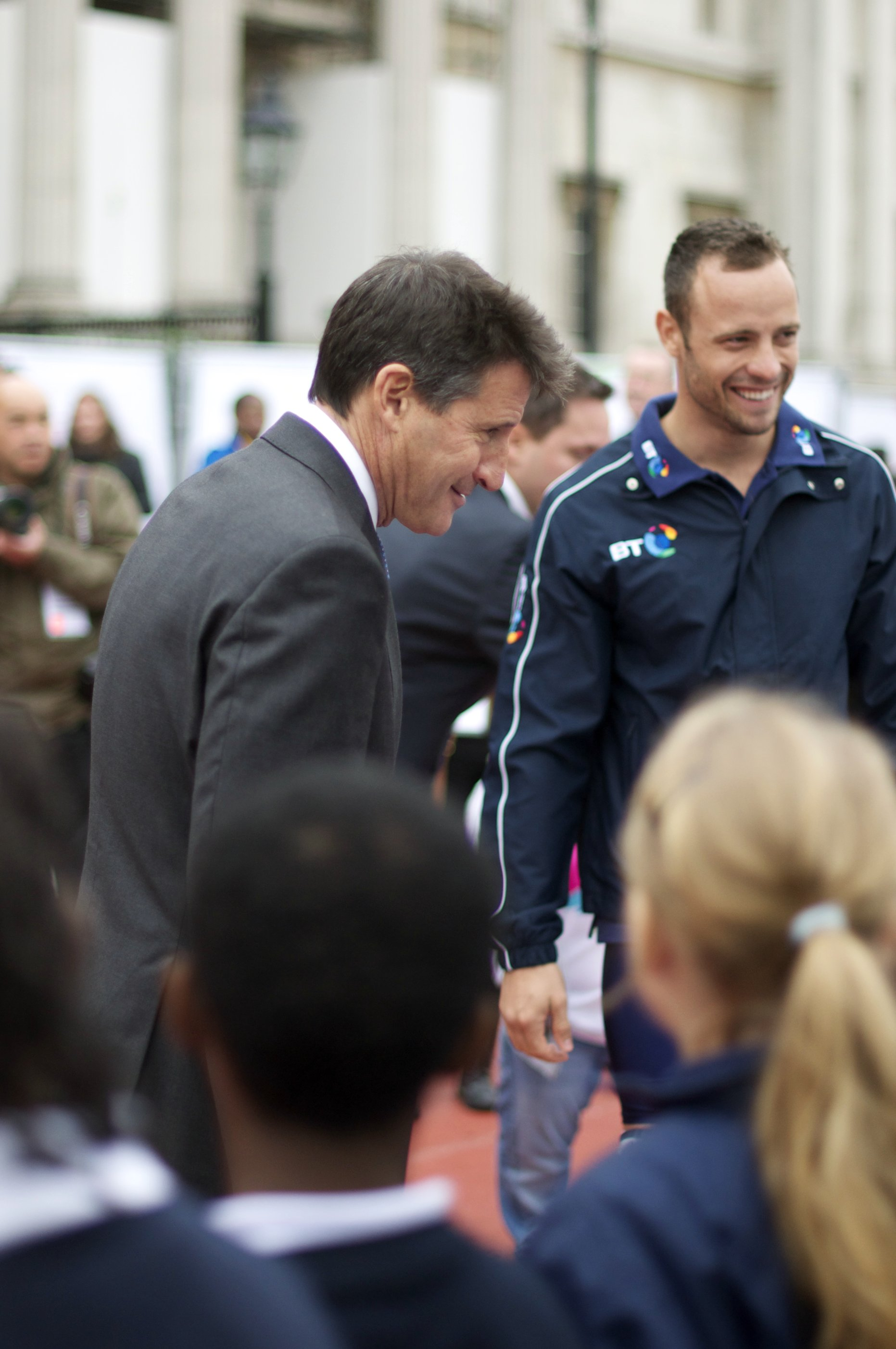
Coe and South African Olympian Oscar Pistorius at an International Paralympic Day event at Trafalgar Square on 8 September 2011

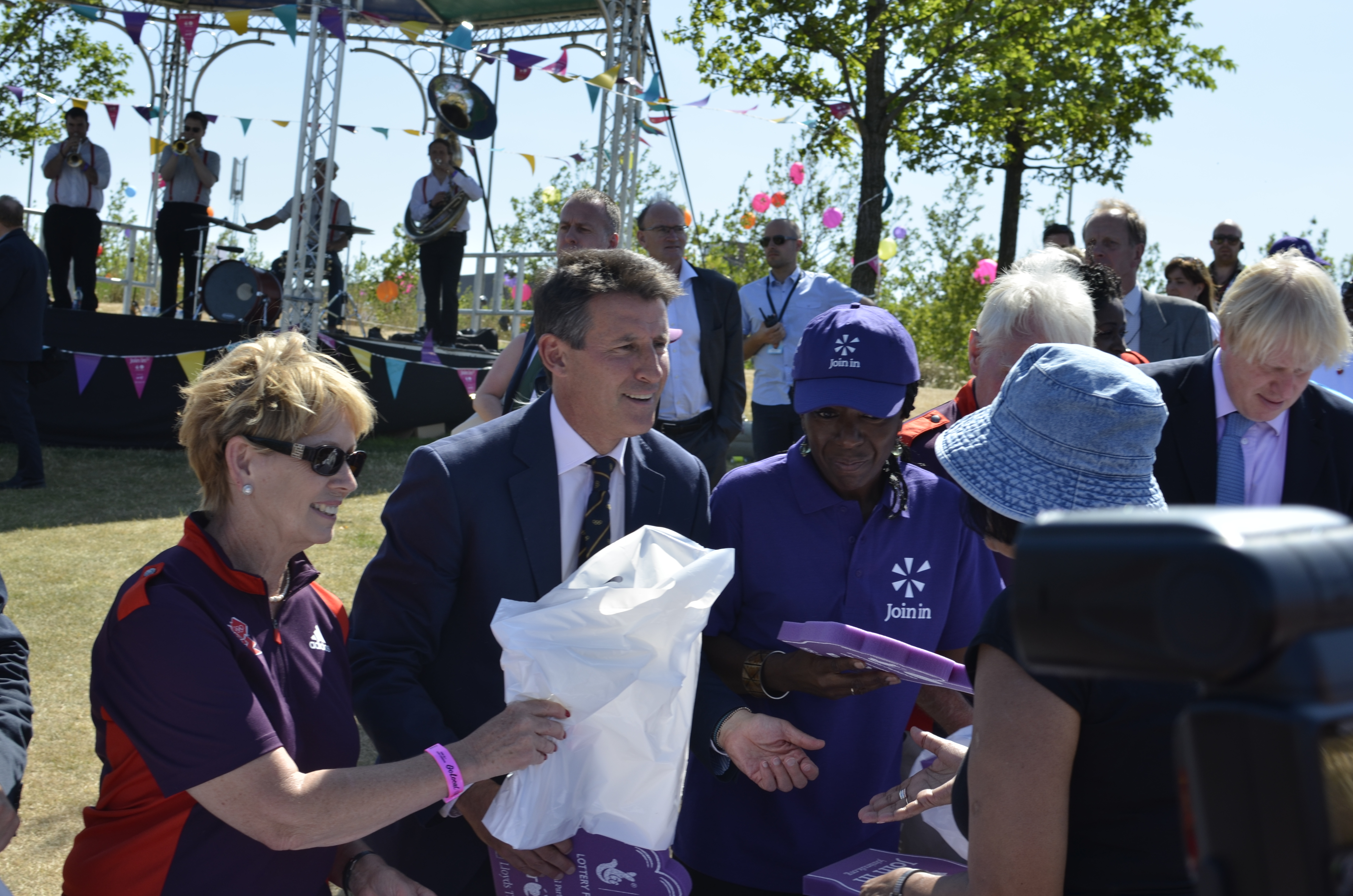
Coe at Go Local, 2013

When London announced its bid to hold the 2012 Olympics, Coe became an ambassador for the effort and a member of the board of the bid company. With the May 2004 resignation of chairman Barbara Cassani, Coe became the chairman for the latter phase of the bid. As Coe was a well-known personality in Olympic sport, it was felt he was better suited to the diplomatic finesse needed to secure the IOC's backing. Coe's presentation at the critical IOC meeting in July 2005 was viewed by commentators as being particularly effective, against tough competition from Paris and Madrid, and the London bid won the IOC's blessing on 6 July.

Coe attended the 2010 Winter Olympics held in Vancouver to see how the city coped with the challenges of hosting. Lord Coe noted the Games had "gradually recovered from its tumultuous start" and queried that he "never thought the British would find rivals in their preoccupation with the weather which is almost elevated to an Olympic event" as he credited VANOC for meeting unforeseen challenges such as the unseasonably warm weather of Cypress Mountain. Coe added "Rarely have I seen a host city so passionate and so ready to embrace the Games".

Coe was instrumental in asking Queen Elizabeth II to star in Happy and Glorious, a short film featuring James Bond, which formed part of the 2012 Summer Olympics opening ceremony. The director of the ceremony, Danny Boyle first pitched the idea to Coe, who loved it so much that he took it to Edward Young, Deputy Private Secretary to the Queen. A friend of Coe's from their days of advising William Hague, Young "listened sagely, laughed, and promised to ask the Boss". Coe was subsequently informed that she would love to take part.

=== FIFA ===
Coe was appointed the first chairman of FIFA's independent watchdog, the FIFA Ethics Committee. The commission will judge all cases alleging conflicts of interest and breaches of FIFA rules. FIFA president Sepp Blatter made the announcement in Zurich on 15 September 2006 and said: "It is perhaps a surprise but it has been very well received. We have found an outstanding personality in the world of sport, a great personality in the Olympic movement." His appointment makes him one of the most senior Englishmen to work for FIFA.

He stood down from this post to join the English committee that failed to bring the 2018 World Cup to England, with Russia chosen to host instead.

=== International Association of Athletics Federations ===
In 2007 Coe was appointed as vice President of the International Association of Athletics Federations (IAAF) and was reappointed in 2011. When Lamine Diack president of the IAAF announced that he was standing down in 2013 seemed likely to announce Coe as his successor as there had never been an election for the President position. Coe, in November 2014 announced that he would stand for election for this position in 2015. In December 2014, Coe unveiled his manifesto, 'Growing Athletics in a New Age.' On 19 August 2015, in Beijing, he was elected president of IAAF against Sergey Bubka, by 115 votes to 92 votes. On 17 August 2023, in Budapest, he was re-elected unopposed for a third and final term of office as president.

=== British Olympic Association ===
Following the London Olympics, Coe was appointed as Chairman of the British Olympic Association, replacing Lord Moynihan.

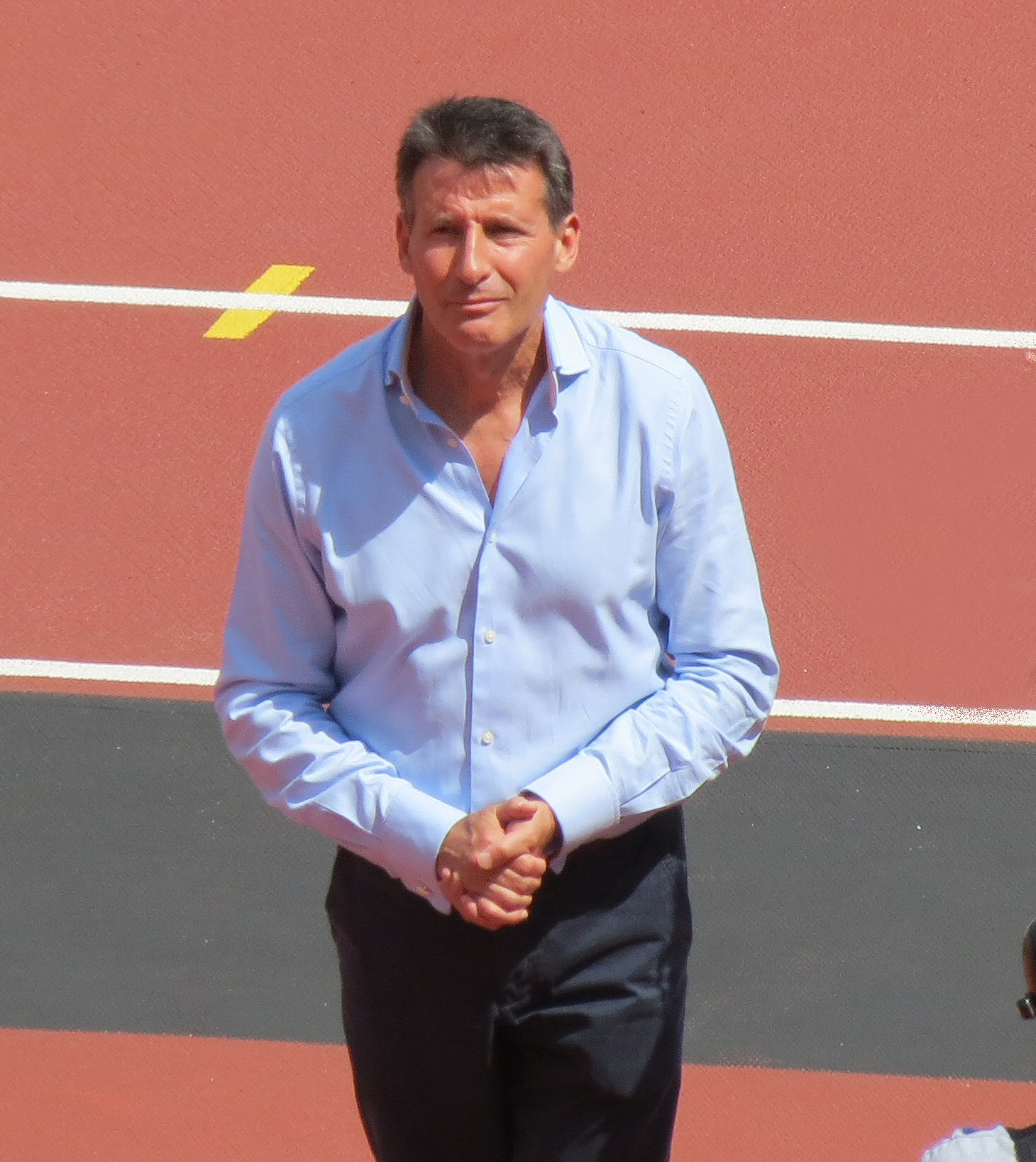
Sebastian Coe at the London Anniversary Games, July 2013

=== Tokyo 2020 Olympic Games ===
Coe was appointed a member of the Tokyo 2020 Olympic Games Coordination Commission representing the Association of National Olympic Committees.

=== International Olympic Committee ===
On 17 July 2020, Coe was elected a member of the International Olympic Committee. In September 2024, he was announced as one of seven candidates in the running to succeed Thomas Bach as IOC president. He received eight votes at the 144th IOC Session in March 2025, with Kirsty Coventry winning the election.

=== GEMS Education ===
Coe is a sports advisor to the GEMS School of Research and Innovation from August 2025.

== Personal life ==
After graduating in 1980, and a few months after his exploits on the track in the 1980–81 seasons, Coe got a job as a research assistant at the Loughborough University of Technology in the department of Physical Education and Sports Science.

In 1990, when resident in Surrey, Coe married Nicky McIrvine, a former Badminton three-day-event champion, with whom he has two sons and two daughters. The marriage ended in divorce in 2002.

In 2003, Coe began a relationship with Carole Annett; the couple married in 2011. She is the daughter of former England cricket captain M. J. K. Smith.

Coe is a worldwide ambassador for Nike and owns a string of health clubs with a membership of more than 20,000. He is a member of the East India Club, a private gentlemen's club in St James's Square. He has supported London athletic events such as the London 10K of Nike and the British 10K charity race. On 12 February 2010, Coe was the 19th runner on the 106th day of the Vancouver Olympic Torch Relay. Coe's leg was along the Stanley Park Seawall.

In October 2012, Coe was appointed chairman of Chime Communications sports marketing subsidiary, CSM Sport and Entertainment. The company also entered into an 'option agreement' to buy Coe's 93% interest in CLG, the firm which acts as a vehicle for his earnings from speeches and appearances.

Coe appeared in an episode of the BBC TV series Who Do You Think You Are?, which showed that he is descended from John Astley, the portrait painter, Jamaican sugar farmers and slave owners, George Clarke, Lieutenant Governor of New York Colony, and Edward Hyde of Norbury.

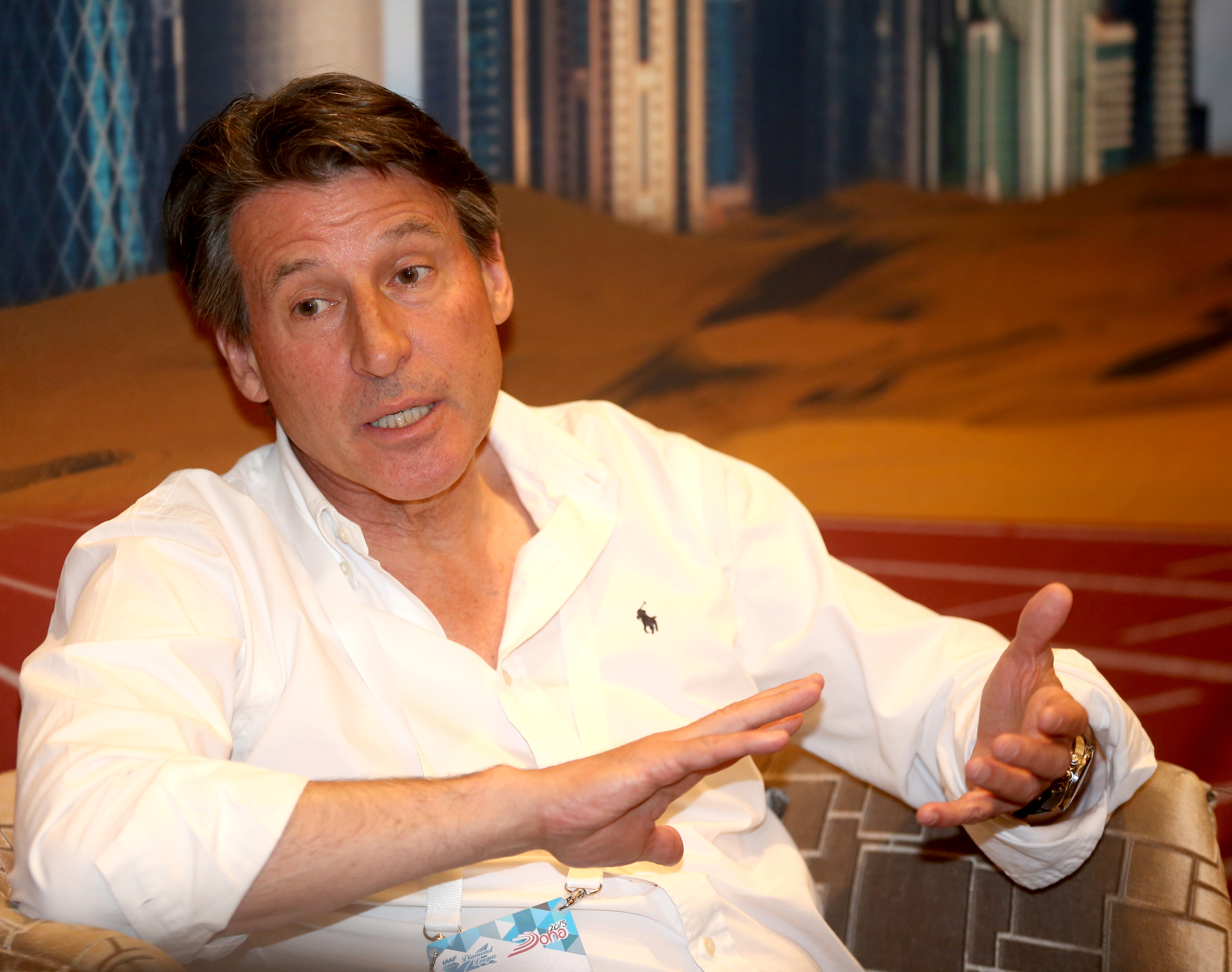
Sebastian Coe, 2015

Coe retired from the House of Lords on 31 January 2022.

He is a columnist for The Daily Telegraph.

== Honours ==
Coe was made an Honorary Doctor of Technology (Hon DTech) by his alma mater, Loughborough University in 1985. In November 2009, he was awarded an honorary degree as Doctor of Science (Hon DSc) from the University of East London. In 2009, he also was awarded an Honorary Fellow of the Royal Institute of British Architects. He also received an honorary Doctorate of Letters from the University of Sunderland in 2011.

He was appointed Member of the Order of the British Empire (MBE) in the 1982 New Year Honours and Officer of the Order of the British Empire (OBE) in the 1990 New Year Honours. On 16 May 2000, he was created a Life Peer as Baron Coe, of Ranmore in the County of Surrey. He was appointed Knight Commander of the Order of the British Empire (KBE) in the 2006 New Year Honours for services to sport. In the 2013 New Year Honours, Coe was appointed Member of the Order of the Companions of Honour (CH) for services to the London 2012 Olympic and Paralympic Games. He represented the Order at the 2023 Coronation.

He was presented with the first Prince of Asturias Award (Sports category) in 1987. After his work in delivering London 2012 Coe was presented with an Olympic Order. Coe received another lifetime achievement award at the Laureus World Sport Awards.

Coe has also received three separate awards at the BBC Sports Personality of the Year ceremony: The main individual award in 1979, a "Special Gold Award" in 2005 and the "Lifetime Achievement Award" in 2012.

A building at the Nike world headquarters in Beaverton Oregon was named after Sebastian Coe in 2017. Coe is a longtime Nike athlete and was recognised by Nike as a great middle-distance runner. The 'Nike Sebastian Coe building' was designed to emphasise connectivity.

Coe was included in The Sunday Times' "100 Makers of the 21st Century" list. In 2018 he was recognised as a Tourism Australia's Friend of Australia, in conjunction with the 2018 Gold Coast Commonwealth Games. In addition in 2018 Coe was awarded an OLY post nominal title from World Olympians Association.

At the 2024 Millrose Games, Coe was the recipient of The Armory's Presidents Award.

== Personal bests ==
Distance	Mark	Date	Place
400 m	46.87	14 July 1979	AAA Championships, London (Crystal Palace), UK
4 × 400 m relay	45.5	5 August 1979	European Cup, Turin, ITA
600 m	1:15.0	10 June 1981	Florence, ITA
800 m	1:41.73 (WR)	10 June 1981	Florence, ITA
1000 m	2:12.18 (WR)	11 July 1981	Oslo, NOR
1500 m	3:29.77	7 September 1986	Rieti, ITA
Mile	3:47.33 (WR)	28 August 1981	Brussels, BEL
2000 m	4:58.84	5 June 1982	Bordeaux, FRA
3000 m	7:54.32	23 April 1986	Cosford, UK
5000 m	14:06.2	11 May 1980	Cudworth, UK

(WR) indicates personal best which was also a World Record when set.

Parliament of the United Kingdom
Preceded by David Mudd	Member of Parliament for Falmouth and Camborne; 1992–1997	Succeeded by Candy Atherton
Records
Preceded by Alberto Juantorena	Men's 800 metres world record holder 5 July 1979 – 7 July 1997	Succeeded by Wilson Kipketer
Preceded by Filbert Bayi	Men's 1500 m world record holder 15 August 1979 – 27 August 1980	Succeeded by Steve Ovett
Preceded by John Walker	Men's mile world record holder 17 July 1979 – 1 July 1980	Succeeded by Steve Ovett
Preceded by Steve Ovett	Men's mile world record holder 19 August 1981 – 26 August 1981	Succeeded by Steve Ovett
Preceded by Steve Ovett	Men's mile world record holder 28 August 1981 – 27 July 1985	Succeeded by Steve Cram
Preceded by Marcello Fiasconaro	European record holder men's 800 m 5 July 1979 – 6 July 1997	Succeeded by Wilson Kipketer
Preceded by Jean Wadoux	European record holder men's 1500 m 17 July 1979 – 26 August 1980	Succeeded by Steve Ovett
Awards and achievements
Preceded by Steve Ovett	BBC Sports Personality of the Year; 1979	Succeeded by Robin Cousins
Preceded by Henry Rono	United Press International; Athlete of the Year; 1979	Succeeded by Eric Heiden
Preceded by Henry Rono	Men's Track & Field Athlete of the Year; 1979	Succeeded by Edwin Moses
Preceded by Eric Heiden	United Press International; Athlete of the Year; 1981	Succeeded by Daley Thompson
Preceded by Eric Heiden	Men's Track & Field Athlete of the Year; 1981	Succeeded by Paolo Rossi
Preceded by Michael Jordan	L'Équipe Champion of Champions; 1981	Succeeded by Romario
Preceded by Inaugural award	Prince of Asturias Award for Sports; 1987	Succeeded by Juan Antonio Samaranch
Sporting positions
Preceded by Liu Qi	President of Organizing Committee for Summer Olympic Games; Games of the XXX Olympiad	Succeeded by Carlos Arthur Nuzman
Preceded by Lamine Diack	President of the IAAF/World Athletics; 2015–	Succeeded by Incumbent
Orders of precedence in the United Kingdom
Preceded by The Lord Parekh	Gentlemen; Baron Coe	Followed by The Lord Jordan
