= James Robinson (runner) =

American middle-distance runner

Personal information
- Born: August 27, 1954 (age 72)
Medal record
Men's Athletics
Representing the United States
Pan American Games
Gold medal – first place	1979 San Juan	800 meters

James J. Robinson Jr. (born August 27, 1954, in Oakland, California) is an American former middle-distance runner. He was the dominant American 800 meters runner from the mid-1970s through the mid 1980s. He ran in the 1976 Summer Olympics in Montreal, Quebec, Canada, finishing fifth in his semi-final and not making the final. He was on the ill-fated 1980 U.S. Olympic team that did not get to compete due to the 1980 Summer Olympics boycott. He did however receive one of 461 Congressional Gold Medals created especially for the spurned athletes.

His international achievements included a silver medal at the 1979 IAAF World Cup and 1981 IAAF World Cup and a gold medal at the 1979 Pan American Games over the reigning Olympic Gold Medalist and (until that week) world record holder, Alberto Juantorena. He also finished fifth in the 1983 World Championships in Athletics. Domestically he won the American title at 880 yard or 800 meters 7 times including five times in a row between 1978 and 1982. During that same period while Robinson was the best outdoors, he did not win a single Indoor title. The answer to this was that Robinson's strategy didn't work on the short straightaways indoors.

Robinson's notable strategy was to come from behind, with the late rush on the home stretch always thrilling the crowd. When this strategy evaded him, it almost always looked like a mere strategic error, rather than being beaten by the competition. In the 1984 Olympic Trials in what may have been the most thrilling American 800 meter race ever, Robinson finished in fourth place, not making the team, while having exactly the same time as the third place qualifier John Marshall (1:43.92 - a lifetime best for both men). A step ahead, Earl Jones and Johnny Gray were breaking Rick Wohlhuter's American record (1:43.91) with each running the same time (1:43.74). (See the race on YouTube.) Robinson ran for the Inner City Track Club after college.

Robinson ran for McClymonds High School, finishing second in the 880 yards at the 1972 CIF California State Meet. Next he ran for Laney College, winning the conference and state championships at 880 yards both 1973 and 1974, his 1974 time of 1:45.7 set the National Junior College record for 800 meters and remains the Laney College record. His 47.5 440 yards from 1974 also remains the college record. He also anchored his team's mile relay which finished second and third those respective years. And he ran for the University of California at Berkeley, California where he is still #2 on the school's all-time list and the anchor man of the school record 4 × 400 meters relay team (held since 1976, the first year the NCAA ran the metric distance).

Robinson is currently an assistant Track and Cross Country coach at California State University, East Bay.

His brother Ken Robinson was a Pan American and World University Games champion sprinter in the 4 × 100 metres relay.
