= Philippe Dupont =

French middle-distance runner

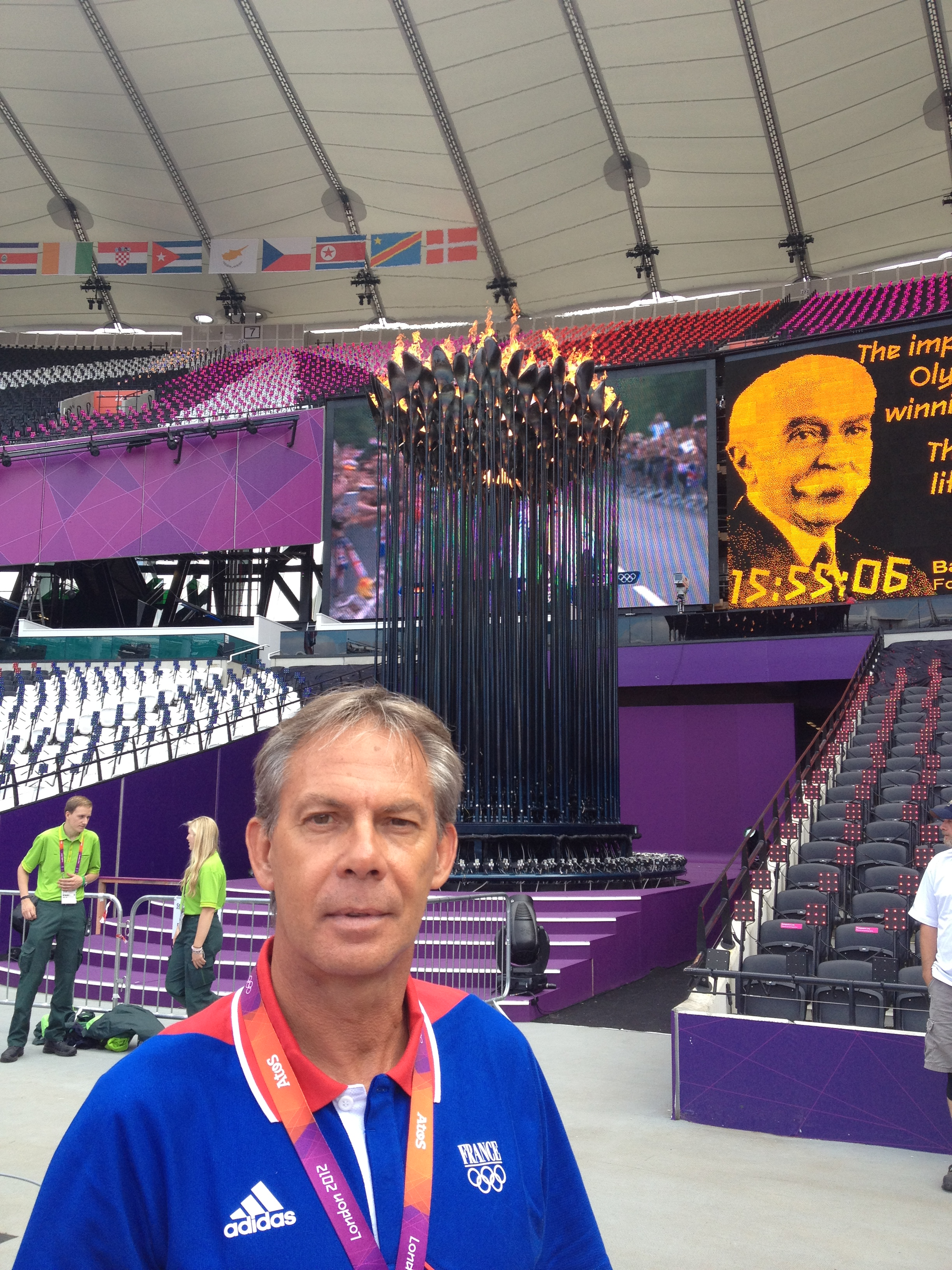
- Philippe Dupont in 2012

Personal information
- Nationality: French
- Born: 31 May 1958 (age 68) Le Mans, France

Sport
- Sport: Middle-distance running
- Event: 800 metres

Philippe Dupont (born 31 May 1958) is a French middle-distance runner. He competed in the 800 metres at the 1980 Summer Olympics and the 1984 Summer Olympics.
