= Andreas Busse =

German middle-distance runner

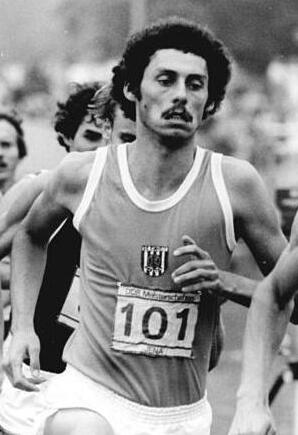
Busse in 1981

Andreas Busse (born 6 May 1959 in Dresden) is a German former middle-distance runner who represented East Germany during his career. He was a member of the Sportclub Einheit Dresden.

== Personal bests ==
- 800 metres: 1:44.72 min, 10 May 1980, Potsdam
- 800m indoors: 1:47.1 min, 11 February 1981, Cosford
- 1000 Metres: 2:15.25 min, 31 July 1983, East Berlin
- 1500 Metres: 3:34.10 min, 21 July 1984 Potsdam
- 1 Mile: 3:53.55 min, 20 August 1982, West Berlin
- 3000 Metres: 7:51.17 min, 20 June 1988, Düsseldorf

== International competitions ==
Year	Competition	Venue	Position	Event	Notes
Representing East Germany
1980	Olympic Games	Moscow, Soviet Union	5th	800 m	
1980	Olympic Games	Moscow, Soviet Union	4th	1500 m	
1983	World Championships	Helsinki, Finland	7th	1500 m	
1984	Friendship Games	Moscow, Soviet Union	1st	1500 m	3:36.65
1986	European Championships	Stuttgart, West Germany	18th	1500 m	
