= Jón Diðriksson =

Icelandic middle-distance runner

Personal information
- Nationality: Icelandic
- Born: 17 June 1955 (age 70) Borgarnes
- Height: 194 cm (6 ft 4 in)
- Weight: 79 kg (174 lb)

Sport
- Country: Iceland
- Sport: Middle-distance running

Jón Diðriksson is an Icelandic Olympic middle-distance runner. He represented his country in the men's 1500 meters and the men's 800 meters at the 1980 Summer Olympics. His time was 3:44.34 in the 1500 m and 1:51.10 in the 800 m.

Jón is the Icelandic record holder over the distances of 1000 meters, a Mile and 2000 meters.
