= Olaf Beyer =

German middle-distance runner

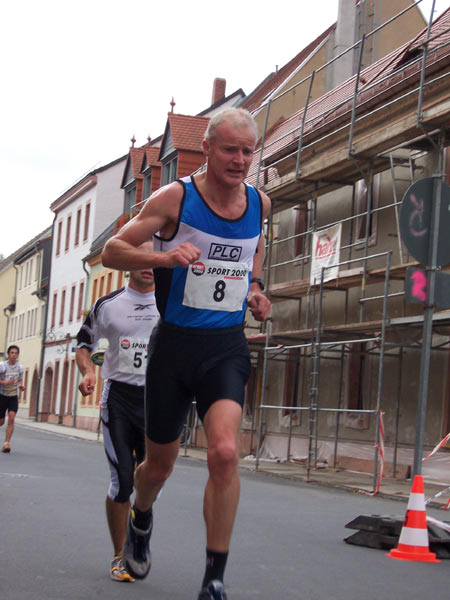
- Beyer in 2004

Medal record

Men's athletics

Representing East Germany

European Championships
| Gold medal – first place | 1978 Prague | 800 m |

European Indoor Championships
| Silver medal – second place | 1978 Milan | 800 m |

Olaf Beyer (born 4 August 1957 in Grimma) is a former East German 800 metres runner.

== Biography ==
He won the gold medal at the 1978 European Championships in Prague. In that race he beat the future world-record holder Sebastian Coe and the future Olympic Champion Steve Ovett both from the UK. Beyer's time of 1:43.84 made him temporarily the fourth-fastest 800m runner of all time. Beyer himself explained to the British sports journalist and writer Pat Butcher that he won that surprising championship because for the first and only time in his career, he had been able to train for the previous year free from injuries. He also ran intelligently, not taking the lead until the final tens of metres, but at the same time following Coe and Ovett closely. Ultimately, in Beyer's opinion, he was in a good shape that day and could thus defeat even Ovett, who was known as a sharp kicker (see Pat Butcher, The Perfect Distance: Ovett&Coe: The Record-Breaking Rivalry, London: Weidenfeld&Nicolson, 2004).

In the 1978 European Athletics Championships, he also participated in 1,500 metres where he placed ninth (see, for example, "European Championships Prague" / EM-Praha, Tapio Pekola et al., eds., Kaarina, Finland: "Runner" / Juoksija magazine, 1978). After 1978, he continued his competitive running career until at least 1982, but he never won a major international championship again. In the 1980 Moscow Olympics, he was surprisingly eliminated in the 800-metre semifinals, and he placed seventh in the 1982 European Athletics Championships 800-metre final (see, for example, "The Moscow Olympic Book" / Moskovan Olympiakirja, Tapio Pekola et al., eds., Helsinki, Finland: "Runner" / Juoksija magazine, 1980; Markku Siukonen and Matti Ahola, eds., "The Great European Championships Book" / Suuri EM-kirja, Jyväskylä, Finland: Sports Publications Ltd. / Sportti-Kustannus Oy, 1990).

Beyer has remained a successful runner since the end of his track career.
