= José Marajo =

French middle-distance runner

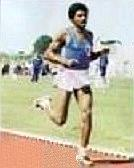

Personal information
- Born: 10 August 1954 (age 71) Paris, France

Sport
- Sport: Track and field
Medal record
Representing France
Summer Universiade
Bronze medal – third place	1977 Sofia	800m
Mediterranean Games
Gold medal – first place	1979 Split	1500m

José Marajo (born 10 August 1954]) is a former middle-distance runner from France. He set his personal best (3:34.93) in the men's 1500 metres in 1983.

== International competitions ==
Year	Competition	Venue	Position	Notes
Representing France
1976	Olympic Games	Montreal, Canada	DNQ	800 m
1978	European Championships	Prague, Czechoslovakia	6th	1500 m
1979	Mediterranean Games	Split, Yugoslavia	1st	1500 m
1980	Olympic Games	Moscow, Soviet Union	7th	800 m
1980	Olympic Games	Moscow, Soviet Union	7th	1500 m
