= Athletics at the 1972 Summer Olympics – Men's 1500 metres =

Men's 1500 metres at the Games of the XX Olympiad
- Olympic Athletics
- Venue: Olympiastadion
- Dates: 8–10 September 1972
- Competitors: 66 from 46 nations
- Winning time: 3:36.3

Medalists
1st place, gold medalist(s)		Pekka Vasala; Finland
2nd place, silver medalist(s)		Kipchoge Keino; Kenya
3rd place, bronze medalist(s)		Rod Dixon; New Zealand

The men's 1,500m metres was an event at the 1972 Summer Olympics in Munich, West Germany. The final was held on Sunday 10 September 1972 and was contested by 10 athletes. The semi-finals were held on Saturday 9 September 1972 and were contested by 27 athletes. The heats were held on Friday 8 September 1972 and 71 athletes entered, with 66 runners from 46 nations competing. The maximum number of athletes per nation had been set at 3 since the 1930 Olympic Congress. The event was won by Pekka Vasala of Finland, the nation's first championship in the 1500 metres since back-to-back wins in 1924 and 1928. Kipchoge Keino of Kenya came half a second short of becoming the first man to successfully defend Olympic gold in the event; instead, his silver made him just the second man to win two medals of any color in the 1500 metres.

== Background ==
This was the 17th appearance of the event, which is one of 12 athletics events to have been held at every Summer Olympics. All three medalists from 1968 (Kipchoge Keino of Kenya, Jim Ryun of the United States, and Bodo Tümmler of West Germany) returned, along with two other finalists: sixth-place finisher Jacky Boxberger of France and seventh-place finisher Henryk Szordykowski of Poland. Ryun "was no longer the dominant runner he had been in 1966–67," but was still the world record holder and had run the third-fastest mile ever between the Olympic trials and the Games. Keino and Ryun were favorites for the top two spots again, especially with their respective countrymen Ben Jipcho (who had played a strategic role helping Keino in the 1968 final, but was now a legitimate contender himself) and Marty Liquori out with injury. A third Kenyan, Mike Boit, was also a challenger, but was more of an 800 metres specialist. Rod Dixon of New Zealand and Pekka Vasala of Finland were also strong challengers.

Sixteen nations made their 1500 metres debut in 1972: Algeria, Burma, Cameroon, East Germany, Ghana, Liberia, Madagascar, Malawi, Nigeria, Panama, Portugal, Saudi Arabia, Somalia, Sudan, Tanzania, and Uganda. The United States made its 17th appearance, the only nation to have competed in the men's 1500 metres at each Games to that point.

== Competition format ==
The competition was again three rounds (used previously in 1952, 1964, and 1968). The "fastest loser" system introduced in 1964, but not used in 1968, returned; once again the semifinals were balanced. Now, however, the semifinal heats and final were set at 10 men each, rather than the 8 or 12 previously.

There were seven heats in the first round, each with 10 or 11 runners (before withdrawals). The top four runners in each heat, along with the next two fastest overall, advanced to the semifinals. The 30 semifinalists were divided into three semifinals, each with 10 runners. The top three men in each semifinal, plus the fastest fourth-placer, advanced to the 10-man final.

== Records ==
These were the standing world and Olympic records prior to the 1972 Summer Olympics.

World record	Jim Ryun (USA)	3:33.1	Los Angeles, United States	8 July 1967
Olympic record	Kip Keino (KEN)	3:34.9	Mexico City, Mexico	20 October 1968

No new world or Olympic records were set during the competition.

== Schedule ==
All times are Central European Time (UTC+1)

Date	Time	Round
Friday, 8 September 1972	16:45	Round 1
Saturday, 9 September 1972	16:40	Semifinals
Sunday, 10 September 1972	15:35	Final

== Results ==
=== Round 1 ===
==== Heat 1 ====
Rank	Athlete	Nation	Time	Notes
1	Thomas Wessinghage	West Germany	3:40.6	Q
2	Dave Wottle	United States	3:40.7	Q
3	Jean-Pierre Dufresne	France	3:40.8	Q
4	Brendan Foster	Great Britain	3:40.8	Q
5	Donaldo Arza	Panama	3:41.8	
6	Ivan Ivanov	Soviet Union	3:42.3	
7	Mehmet Tümkan	Turkey	3:44.0	
8	Mohamed Kacemi	Algeria	3:45.2	
9	Daniel Andrade	Senegal	3:59.2	
10	Dafallah Sultan Farah	Sudan	4:02.9	

==== Heat 2 ====
Rank	Athlete	Nation	Time	Notes
1	Franco Arese	Italy	3:44.0	Q
2	Herman Mignon	Belgium	3:44.2	Q
3	Bodo Tümmler	West Germany	3:44.5	Q
4	Gerd Larsen	Denmark	3:44.7	Q
5	John Kirkbride	Great Britain	3:45.3	
6	Filbert Bayi	Tanzania	3:45.4	
7	Josef Horčic	Czechoslovakia	3:45.7	
8	William Smart	Canada	3:49.2	
—	Bram Wassenaar	Netherlands	DNS	
—	Kassem Hamze	Lebanon	DNS	

==== Heat 3 ====
Rank	Athlete	Nation	Time	Notes
1	Shibrou Regassa	Ethiopia	3:43.6	Q
2	Spilios Zakharopoulos	Greece	3:43.8	Q
3	Henryk Szordykowski	Poland	3:44.2	Q
4	Pekka Paivarinta	Finland	3:44.4	Q
5	André de Hertoghe	Belgium	3:44.6	
6	Petre Lupan	Romania	3:44.8	
7	Mohamed Makdouf	Morocco	3:48.4	
8	Abdul Wahab Naser Al-Safra	Saudi Arabia	4:14.5	
—	Benson Mulomba	Zambia	DNS	
—	Robert Leborgne	France	DNS	

==== Heat 4 ====
Both Ryun and Fordjour fell when the latter clipped the former's heel, knocking both out of contention for advancement. The United States appealed, asserting that Ryun was tripped. Although the International Olympic Committee (IOC) acknowledged that a foul had occurred, U.S. appeals to have Ryun reinstated in the competition were denied.

Rank	Athlete	Nation	Time	Notes
1	Kipchoge Keino	Kenya	3:40.0	Q
2	Rod Dixon	New Zealand	3:40.0	Q
3	Gunnar Ekman	Sweden	3:40.4	Q
4	Klaus-Peter Justus	East Germany	3:40.4	Q
5	Gianni del Buono	Italy	3:40.8	q
6	Werner Meier	Switzerland	3:43.2	
7	Mohamad Younas	Pakistan	3:44.1	
8	Vitus Ashaba	Uganda	3:45.2	
9	Jim Ryun	United States	3:51.5	
10	Billy Fordjour	Ghana	4:08.2	
—	Yevgeniy Arzhanov	Soviet Union	DNS	

==== Heat 5 ====
Rank	Athlete	Nation	Time	Notes
1	Hailu Ebba	Ethiopia	3:41.6	Q
2	Paul-Heinz Wellmann	West Germany	3:41.8	Q
3	Ray Smedley	Great Britain	3:42.1	Q
4	Chris Fisher	Australia	3:42.5	Q
5	Frank Murphy	Ireland	3:43.4	
6	Byron Dyce	Jamaica	3:45.9	
7	Cosmas Silei	Kenya	3:52.0	
8	Joze Medjimurec	Yugoslavia	3:52.1	
9	Harry Nkopeka	Malawi	4:00.9	
10	Edward Kar	Liberia	4:21.4	

==== Heat 6 ====
Rank	Athlete	Nation	Time	Notes
1	Pekka Vasala	Finland	3:40.9	Q
2	Tom Hansen	Denmark	3:41.1	Q
3	Bob Wheeler	United States	3:41.3	Q
4	Haico Scham	Netherlands	3:41.4	Q
5	Ulf Högberg	Sweden	3:41.5	q
6	Edgard Salvé	Belgium	3:42.1	
7	Anthony Colon	Puerto Rico	3:44.6	
8	Edouard Rasoanaivo	Madagascar	3:48.5	
9	Jaiye Abidoye	Nigeria	3:48.8	
10	Mohamed Aboker	Somalia	3:59.5	

==== Heat 7 ====
Rank	Athlete	Nation	Time	Notes
1	Mike Boit	Kenya	3:42.2	Q
2	Tony Polhill	New Zealand	3:42.3	Q
3	Volodymyr Panteley	Soviet Union	3:42.3	Q
4	Jacques Boxberger	France	3:42.6	Q
5	Mansour Guettaya	Tunisia	3:43.9	
6	Fernando Eugenio Mamede	Portugal	3:45.1	
7	Azzedine Azzouzi	Algeria	3:46.4	
8	Kenneth Elmer	Canada	3:46.6	
9	Esaie Fongang	Cameroon	3:54.5	
10	Jimmy Crampton	Burma	4:06.9	

=== Semifinals ===
==== Semifinal 1 ====
Rank	Athlete	Nation	Time	Notes
1	Mike Boit	Kenya	3:41.3	Q
2	Volodymyr Panteley	Soviet Union	3:41.6	Q
3	Tom Hansen	Denmark	3:41.6	Q
4	Dave Wottle	United States	3:41.6	
5	Chris Fisher	Australia	3:42.0	
6	Gianni del Buono	Italy	3:42.0	
7	Thomas Wessinghage	West Germany	3:43.4	
8	Spilios Zacharopoulos	Greece	3:43.5	
9	Ulf Högberg	Sweden	3:43.6	
10	Hailu Ebba	Ethiopia	3:43.7	

==== Semifinal 2 ====
Rank	Athlete	Nation	Time	Notes
1	Kipchoge Keino	Kenya	3:41.2	Q
2	Herman Mignon	Belgium	3:41.7	Q
3	Tony Polhill	New Zealand	3:41.8	Q
4	Shibrou Regassa	Ethiopia	3:41.9	
5	Jacques Boxberger	France	3:42.4	
6	Henryk Szordykowski	Poland	3:42.5	
7	Haico Scharn	Netherlands	3:44.4	
8	Pekka Päivärinta	Finland	3:45.1	
9	Ray Smedley	Great Britain	3:45.8	
10	Bodo Tümmler	West Germany	3:50.0	

==== Semifinal 3 ====
Rank	Athlete	Nation	Time	Notes
1	Rod Dixon	New Zealand	3:37.9	Q
2	Pekka Vasala	Finland	3:37.9	Q
3	Brendan Foster	Great Britain	3:38.2	Q
4	Paul-Heinz Wellmann	West Germany	3:38.4	q
5	Gunnar Ekman	Sweden	3:39.4	
6	Bob Wheeler	United States	3:40.4	
7	Franco Arese	Italy	3:41.1	
8	Jean-Pierre Dufresne	France	3:41.6	
9	Klaus-Peter Justus	East Germany	3:44.6	
10	Gerd Larsen	Denmark	3:59.4	

=== Final ===
Rank	Athlete	Nation	Time
1st place, gold medalist(s)	Pekka Vasala	Finland	3:36.3
2nd place, silver medalist(s)	Kipchoge Keino	Kenya	3:36.8
3rd place, bronze medalist(s)	Rod Dixon	New Zealand	3:37.5
4	Mike Boit	Kenya	3:38.4
5	Brendan Foster	Great Britain	3:39.0
6	Herman Mignon	Belgium	3:39.1
7	Paul-Heinz Wellmann	West Germany	3:40.1
8	Volodymyr Panteley	Soviet Union	3:40.2
9	Tony Polhill	New Zealand	3:41.8
10	Tom Hansen	Denmark	3:46.6

== See also ==
- 1978 Men's European Championships 1,500 metres (Prague)
