= 1971 European Athletics Championships – Men's 1500 metres =

Men's 1500 metres at the European Athletics Championships

The men's 1500 metres at the 1971 European Athletics Championships was held in Helsinki, Finland, at Helsinki Olympic Stadium on 13 and 15 August 1971.

== Medalists ==
Gold	Francesco Arese; Italy
Silver	Henryk Szordykowski; Poland
Bronze	Brendan Foster; Great Britain

== Results ==
=== Final ===
15 August

Rank	Name	Nationality	Time	Notes
1st place, gold medalist(s)	Francesco Arese	Italy	3:38.43	CR
2nd place, silver medalist(s)	Henryk Szordykowski	Poland	3:38.73	
3rd place, bronze medalist(s)	Brendan Foster	Great Britain	3:39.24	
4	John Kirkbride	Great Britain	3:39.48	
5	Jacques Boxberger	France	3:39.57	
6	Jean-Pierre Dufresne	France	3:40.68	
7	Paul-Heinz Wellmann	West Germany	3:40.78	
8	Haico Scharn	Netherlands	3:40.92	
9	Pekka Vasala	Finland	3:41.49	
10	Volodymyr Panteley	Soviet Union	3:42.90	
11	Viktor Semyashkin	Soviet Union	3:44.18	
12	Gerd Larsen	Denmark	3:45.68	

=== Heats ===
13 August

==== Heat 1 ====
Rank	Name	Nationality	Time	Notes
1	Volodymyr Panteley	Soviet Union	3:42.2	Q
2	Henryk Szordykowski	Poland	3:42.3	Q
3	Jean-Pierre Dufresne	France	3:42.5	Q
4	Brendan Foster	Great Britain	3:42.8	Q
5	Atanas Atanasov	Bulgaria	3:43.2	
6	Antonio Burgos	Spain	3:43.3	
7	Knut Kvalheim	Norway	3:43.7	
8	Renzo Finelli	Italy	3:43.9	
9	Gilbert Van Manshoven	Belgium	3:45.0	
10	Tom Birger Hansen	Denmark	3:46.3	
11	Fernando Mamede	Portugal	3:49.3	

==== Heat 2 ====
Rank	Name	Nationality	Time	Notes
1	Jacques Boxberger	France	3:43.6	Q
2	Pekka Vasala	Finland	3:43.6	Q
3	Haico Scharn	Netherlands	3:43.7	Q
4	Viktor Semyashkin	Soviet Union	3:43.7	Q
5	André De Hertoghe	Belgium	3:43.7	
6	Frank Murphy	Ireland	3:44.0	
7	Peter Stewart	Great Britain	3:45.0	
8	Slavko Koprivica	Yugoslavia	3:48.9	
9	Jerzy Maluśki	Poland	3:53.7	
10	Aurelio Falero	Gibraltar	4:01.3	NR
11	Gianni Del Buono	Italy	4:01.8	

==== Heat 3 ====
Rank	Name	Nationality	Time	Notes
1	Paul-Heinz Wellmann	West Germany	3:51.8	Q
2	Francesco Arese	Italy	3:52.1	Q
3	John Kirkbride	Great Britain	3:52.6	Q
4	Gerd Larsen	Denmark	3:52.7	Q
5	Jan Prasek	Poland	3:52.8	
6	Robert Leborgne	France	3:53.3	
7	Bram Wassenaar	Netherlands	3:54.2	
8	Pavel Pěnkava	Czechoslovakia	3:55.2	
9	Mikhail Zhelobovskiy	Soviet Union	3:55.6	
10	Mehmet Tümkan	Turkey	3:57.4	

== Participation ==
According to an unofficial count, 32 athletes from 19 countries participated in the event.

- Belgium (2)
- Bulgaria (1)
- Czechoslovakia (1)
- Denmark (2)
- Finland (1)
- France (3)
- Gibraltar (1)
- Ireland (1)
- Italy (3)
- Netherlands (2)
- Norway (1)
- Poland (3)
- Portugal (1)
- Soviet Union (3)
- Spain (1)
- Turkey (1)
- Great Britain (3)
- West Germany (1)
- Yugoslavia (1)
