= 1971 European Athletics Indoor Championships – Men's 1500 metres =

The men's 1500 metres event at the 1971 European Athletics Indoor Championships was held on 13 and 14 March in Sofia.

== Medalists ==
Gold	Silver	Bronze
Henryk Szordykowski; Poland	Volodymyr Panteley; Soviet Union	Gianni Del Buono; Italy

== Results ==
=== Heats ===
Held on 13 March

First 2 from each heat (Q) qualified directly for the final.

Rank	Heat	Name	Nationality	Time	Notes
1	1	Gianni Del Buono	Italy	3:49.1	Q
2	1	Bram Wassenaar	Netherlands	3:49.7	Q
3	1	Henry Gustafsson	Sweden	3:52.0	
4	1	José Maria Alonso	Spain	3:56.3	
5	1	Mehmet Tümkan	Turkey	3:57.8	
6	1	Edmond van Houwenis	Belgium	4:00.6	
1	2	Henryk Szordykowski	Poland	3:45.8	Q
2	2	Mikhail Zhelobovskiy	Soviet Union	3:45.9	Q
3	2	Pierre Toussaint	France	3:49.6	
4	2	Haico Scharn	Netherlands	3:50.1	
5	2	Pekka Vasala	Finland	3:52.1	
6	2	Alberto Esteban	Spain	4:00.8	
1	3	Volodymyr Panteley	Soviet Union	3:47.7	Q
2	3	Walter Wilkinson	Great Britain	3:49.0	Q
3	3	Jan Kondzior	France	3:50.4	
4	3	Jože Međimurec	Yugoslavia	3:53.0	
5	3	Spilios Zakharopoulos	Greece	3:53.3	
6	3	Juan Borraz	Spain	3:57.2	
1	4	Ulf Högberg	Sweden	3:46.0	Q
2	4	Frank Murphy	Ireland	3:46.2	Q
3	4	Jacky Boxberger	France	3:47.1	
4	4	Edgard Salvé	Belgium	3:48.9	
5	4	Ivan Kováč	Czechoslovakia	3:55.2	
6	4	Nayden Petrov	Bulgaria	3:55.2	

=== Final ===
Held on 14 March

Rank	Name	Nationality	Time	Notes
1st place, gold medalist(s)	Henryk Szordykowski	Poland	3:41.4	CR, NR
2nd place, silver medalist(s)	Volodymyr Panteley	Soviet Union	3:41.5	NR
3rd place, bronze medalist(s)	Gianni Del Buono	Italy	3:42.1	
4	Ulf Högberg	Sweden	3:43.2	
5	Mikhail Zhelobovskiy	Soviet Union	3:43.7	
6	Frank Murphy	Ireland	3:44.3	
7	Walter Wilkinson	Great Britain	3:46.9	
8	Bram Wassenaar	Netherlands	3:48.1	
