= 1974 European Athletics Championships – Men's 1500 metres =

Men's 1500 metres at the European Athletics Championships

The men's 1500 metres at the 1974 European Athletics Championships was held in Rome, Italy, at Stadio Olimpico on 6 and 8 September 1974.

== Medalists ==
Gold	Klaus-Peter Justus; East Germany
Silver	Tom Birger Hansen; Denmark
Bronze	Thomas Wessinghage; West Germany

== Results ==
=== Final ===
8 September

Rank	Name	Nationality	Time	Notes
1st place, gold medalist(s)	Klaus-Peter Justus	East Germany	3:40.55	
2nd place, silver medalist(s)	Tom Birger Hansen	Denmark	3:40.75	
3rd place, bronze medalist(s)	Thomas Wessinghage	West Germany	3:41.1	
4	Haico Scharn	Netherlands	3:41.3	
5	Volodymyr Panteley	Soviet Union	3:41.4	
6	Pekka Vasala	Finland	3:41.5	
7	Paul-Heinz Wellmann	West Germany	3:41.6	
8	Rolf Gysin	Switzerland	3:41.8	
9	Ulf Högberg	Sweden	3:42.3	
10	Gunnar Ekman	Sweden	3:42.5	
11	Henryk Wasilewski	Poland	3:42.7	
12	Marcel Philippe	France	3:46.0	

=== Heats ===
6 September

==== Heat 1 ====
Rank	Name	Nationality	Time	Notes
1	Ulf Högberg	Sweden	3:42.0	Q
2	Haico Scharn	Netherlands	3:42.5	Q
3	Rolf Gysin	Switzerland	3:42.6	Q
4	Klaus-Peter Justus	East Germany	3:42.8	q
5	Henryk Szordykowski	Poland	3:43.7	
6	Ivan Kováč	Czechoslovakia	3:44.7	
7	John Hartnett	Ireland	3:46.6	
8	Fernando Mamede	Portugal	3:47.1	
9	Gerd Larsen	Denmark	3:47.7	

==== Heat 2 ====
Rank	Name	Nationality	Time	Notes
1	Henryk Wasilewski	Poland	3:43.0	Q
2	Thomas Wessinghage	West Germany	3:43.1	Q
3	Gunnar Ekman	Sweden	3:43.2	Q
4	Gheorghe Ghipu	Romania	3:43.4	
5	Luigi Zarcone	Italy	3:44.4	
6	Pyotr Anisim	Soviet Union	3:44.7	
7	Frank Clement	Great Britain	3:45.0	
8	Lars-Martin Kaupang	Norway	3:47.0	
	Günther Hasler	Liechtenstein	DNF	
	Werner Meier	Switzerland	DNS	

==== Heat 3 ====
Rank	Name	Nationality	Time	Notes
1	Paul-Heinz Wellmann	West Germany	3:42.4	Q
2	Volodymyr Panteley	Soviet Union	3:42.6	Q
3	Marcel Philippe	France	3:42.7	Q
4	Tom Birger Hansen	Denmark	3:43.1	q
5	Pekka Vasala	Finland	3:43.3	q
6	Giulio Riga	Italy	3:43.5	
7	Ray Smedley	Great Britain	3:43.6	
8	Daniel Jańczuk	Poland	3:45.2	
9	Nicolae Onescu	Romania	3:46.7	
10	John Charvetto	Gibraltar	3:55.4	NR

== Participation ==
According to an unofficial count, 28 athletes from 19 countries participated in the event.

- Czechoslovakia (1)
- Denmark (2)
- East Germany (1)
- Finland (1)
- France (1)
- Gibraltar (1)
- Ireland (1)
- Italy (2)
- Liechtenstein (1)
- Netherlands (1)
- Norway (1)
- Poland (3)
- Portugal (1)
- Romania (2)
- Soviet Union (2)
- Sweden (2)
- Switzerland (1)
- Great Britain (2)
- West Germany (2)
