= Athletics at the 1970 Summer Universiade – Men's 1500 metres =

The men's 1500 metres event at the 1970 Summer Universiade was held at the Stadio Comunale in Turin on 2 and 3 September 1970.

== Medalists ==
Gold	Silver	Bronze
Francesco Arese; Italy	John Kirkbride; Great Britain	Gianni Del Buono; Italy

== Results ==
=== Heats ===
Rank	Heat	Athlete	Nationality	Time	Notes
1	1	Francesco Arese	Italy	3:42.0	Q, UR
2	1	Mikhail Zhelobovskiy	Soviet Union	3:42.3	Q
3	1	Robert Leborgne	France	3:42.9	q
4	1	Gilbert Van Manshoven	Belgium	3:43.4	q
5	1	Ingo Sensburg	West Germany	3:46.2	q
6	1	Ramón Montero	Chile	3:50.9	
7	1	Amor Lassoued	Tunisia	3:51.2	
8	1	Atilio Alegre	Brazil	3:52.2	
	1	Yayino Yemane	Ethiopia	DNF	
1	2	John Kirkbride	Great Britain	3:50.9	Q
2	2	Chuck LaBenz	United States	3:51.4	Q
3	2	Dušan Kranova	Yugoslavia	3:51.9	
4	2	Ulrich Brugger	West Germany	3:52.1	
5	2	Pierre Viaux	France	3:52.5	
6	2	Dashondha Singh	India	3:54.3	
7	2	Yuval Wishnitzer	Israel	3:56.2	
8	2	Şahin Turhan	Turkey	3:59.0	
9	2	Rauf Dimraj	Albania	4:00.2	
1	3	Gianni Del Buono	Italy	3:44.2	Q
2	3	Frank Murphy	Ireland	3:44.2	Q
3	3	Brendan Foster	Great Britain	3:45.0	q
4	3	Vladan Đorđević	Yugoslavia	3:46.4	
5	3	Antonio Burgos	Spain	3:48.0	
6	3	John Axsentieff	Australia	3:54.4	
7	3	Kamel Guemar	Algeria	3:57.0	
8	3	José Bordón	Cuba	3:59.0	
9	3	Askres Abera	Ethiopia	4:04.8	
10	3	Mohamed Mounir Hamoud	Kuwait	4:25.3	

=== Final ===
Rank	Name	Nationality	Time	Notes
1st place, gold medalist(s)	Francesco Arese	Italy	3:52.7	
2nd place, silver medalist(s)	John Kirkbride	Great Britain	3:52.9	
3rd place, bronze medalist(s)	Gianni Del Buono	Italy	3:53.0	
4	Robert Leborgne	France	3:53.0	
5	Gilbert Van Manshoven	Belgium	3:53.3	
6	Chuck LaBenz	United States	3:53.5	
7	Frank Murphy	Ireland	3:54.5	
8	Ingo Sensburg	West Germany	3:54.7	
9	Mikhail Zhelobovskiy	Soviet Union	3:54.9	
10	Brendan Foster	Great Britain	3:59.7	
