= 1969 European Athletics Championships – Men's 1500 metres =

Men's 1500 metres at the European Athletics Championships

The men's 1500 metres at the 1969 European Athletics Championships was held in Athens, Greece, at Georgios Karaiskakis Stadium on 18 and 20 September 1969.

== Medalists ==
Gold	John Whetton; Great Britain
Silver	Frank Murphy; Ireland
Bronze	Henryk Szordykowski; Poland

== Results ==
=== Final ===
20 September

Rank	Name	Nationality	Time	Notes
1st place, gold medalist(s)	John Whetton	Great Britain	3:39.45	CR
2nd place, silver medalist(s)	Frank Murphy	Ireland	3:39.51	NR
3rd place, bronze medalist(s)	Henryk Szordykowski	Poland	3:39.87	
4	Edgard Salvé	Belgium	3:39.91	
5	André Dehertoghe	Belgium	3:40.9	
6	Jean Wadoux	France	3:41.7	
7	Pavel Pěnkava	Czechoslovakia	3:41.7	
8	Franco Arese	Italy	3:42.2	
9	Pekka Vasala	Finland	3:44.1	
10	Volodymyr Panteley	Soviet Union	3:45.0	
11	Jerzy Maluśki	Poland	3:48.4	
12	Pierre Viaux	France	3:57.3	

=== Heats ===
18 September

==== Heat 1 ====
Rank	Name	Nationality	Time	Notes
1	Francesco Arese	Italy	3:53.4	Q
2	John Whetton	Great Britain	3:53.6	Q
3	Jerzy Maluśki	Poland	3:53.6	Q
4	Pavel Pěnkava	Czechoslovakia	3:53.8	Q
5	Anatoliy Verlan	Soviet Union	3:54.0	
	Knut Brustad	Norway	DNF	

==== Heat 2 ====
Rank	Name	Nationality	Time	Notes
1	André Dehertoghe	Belgium	3:44.10	Q
2	Henryk Szordykowski	Poland	3:44.1	Q
3	Frank Murphy	Ireland	3:44.3	Q
4	Pierre Viaux	France	3:45.4	Q
5	Jim Douglas	Great Britain	3:46.4	
6	Mehmet Tümkan	Turkey	3:47.0	
7	Hansruedi Knill	Switzerland	3:47.9	
8	Mikhail Zhelobovskiy	Soviet Union	3:48.2	
9	Renzo Finelli	Italy	3:53.0	

==== Heat 3 ====
Rank	Name	Nationality	Time	Notes
1	Edgard Salvé	Belgium	3:53.6	Q
2	Volodymyr Panteley	Soviet Union	3:53.6	Q
3	Jean Wadoux	France	3:53.8	Q
4	Pekka Vasala	Finland	3:53.8	Q
5	John Boulter	Great Britain	3:53.9	
6	Atanas Atanasov	Bulgaria	3:56.1	
7	Eryk Żelazny	Poland	3:57.8	

== Participation ==
According to an unofficial count, 22 athletes from 13 countries participated in the event.

- Belgium (2)
- Bulgaria (1)
- Czechoslovakia (1)
- Finland (1)
- France (2)
- Ireland (1)
- Italy (2)
- Norway (1)
- Poland (3)
- Soviet Union (3)
- Switzerland (1)
- Turkey (1)
- Great Britain (3)
