= Athletics at the 1970 British Commonwealth Games – Men's 1500 metres =

Men's 1500 metres at the 1970 British Commonwealth Games
- Venue: Meadowbank Stadium, Edinburgh
- Dates: 18 and 22 July 1970

Medalists
gold medal	Kipchoge Keino	Kenya
silver medal	Dick Quax	New Zealand
bronze medal	Brendan Foster	England

The men's 1500 metres event at the 1970 British Commonwealth Games was held on 18 and 22 July at the Meadowbank Stadium in Edinburgh, Scotland. It was the first time that the metric distance was contested at the Games, replacing the mile.

== Medallists ==
Medallists
Gold	Silver	Bronze
Kipchoge Keino; Kenya	Dick Quax; New Zealand	Brendan Foster; England

== Results ==
=== Heats ===
==== Qualification for final ====
The first 4 in each heat (Q) qualified directly for the final.

Heats results
Rank	Heat	Name	Nationality	Time	Notes
1	1	Kipchoge Keino	Kenya	3:40.4	Q
2	1	Brendan Foster	England	3:43.8	Q
3	1	Ian McCafferty	Scotland	3:44.1	Q
4	1	Dick Tayler	New Zealand	3:44.3	Q
5	1	Norm Trerise	Canada	3:44.7	
6	1	Jaiye Abidoye	Nigeria	3:48.3	
7	1	Benson Mulomba	Zambia	3:52.4	
8	1	Bob Maplestone	Wales	3:57.2	
9	1	Peter Njera	Malawi	4:01.3	
1	2	Dick Quax	New Zealand	3:44.2	Q
2	2	John Kirkbride	England	3:44.9	Q
3	2	Bill Smart	Canada	3:45.5	Q
4	2	Phillip Thomas	Wales	3:45.5	Q
5	2	Ben Jipcho	Kenya	3:45.6	
6	2	Norman Morrison	Scotland	3:47.3	
7	2	Muhammed Younis	Pakistan	3:48.4	
8	2	Richard Nandolo	Malawi	3:49.2	
9	2	Bernard Banda	Zambia	3:58.0	
1	3	John Whetton	England	3:50.2	Q
2	3	Peter Stewart	Scotland	3:50.2	Q
3	3	Chris Fisher	Australia	3:50.6	Q
4	3	Ergas Leps	Canada	3:51.4	Q
5	3	David Mungai	Kenya	3:52.5	
6	3	Gwynn Davis	Wales	3:52.8	
7	3	Keith Falla	Guernsey	3:54.4	
8	3	Abdul Karim	Pakistan	4:03.0	
9	3	Dandison Moore	Sierra Leone	4:32.0	

=== Final ===
Final results
Rank	Name	Nationality	Time	Notes
1st place, gold medalist(s)	Kipchoge Keino	Kenya	3:36.68	GR
2nd place, silver medalist(s)	Dick Quax	New Zealand	3:38.19	
3rd place, bronze medalist(s)	Brendan Foster	England	3:40.63	
4	Peter Stewart	Scotland	3:40.6	
5	John Whetton	England	3:41.2	
6	Ian McCafferty	Scotland	3:42.2	
7	Phillip Thomas	Wales	3:42.6	
8	Chris Fisher	Australia	3:43.6	
9	John Kirkbride	England	3:44.2	
10	Dick Tayler	New Zealand	3:45.0	
11	Bill Smart	Canada	3:48.6	
12	Ergas Leps	Canada	3:54.0	
