= 1966 European Athletics Championships – Men's 1500 metres =

Men's 1500 metres at the European Athletics Championships

The men's 1500 metres at the 1966 European Athletics Championships was held in Budapest, Hungary, at Népstadion on 30 August and 1 September 1966.

== Medalists ==
Gold	Bodo Tümmler; West Germany
Silver	Michel Jazy; France
Bronze	Harald Norpoth; West Germany

== Results ==
=== Final ===
1 September

Rank	Name	Nationality	Time	Notes
1st place, gold medalist(s)	Bodo Tümmler	West Germany	3:41.9	
2nd place, silver medalist(s)	Michel Jazy	France	3:42.2	
3rd place, bronze medalist(s)	Harald Norpoth	West Germany	3:42.4	
4	Alan Simpson	Great Britain	3:43.8	
5	Jürgen May	East Germany	3:44.1	
6	André De Hertoghe	Belgium	3:44.3	
7	Jean Wadoux	France	3:44.5	
8	Henryk Szordykowski	Poland	3:45.8	
9	Eugène Allonsius	Belgium	3:46.2	
10	Stanislav Hoffman	Czechoslovakia	3:46.5	
11	Walter Wilkinson	Great Britain	3:46.9	
12	Claude Nicolas	France	3:48.1	

=== Heats ===
30 August

==== Heat 1 ====
Rank	Name	Nationality	Time	Notes
1	Harald Norpoth	West Germany	3:44.9	Q
2	Michel Jazy	France	3:45.1	Q
3	Walter Wilkinson	Great Britain	3:45.4	Q
4	Stanislav Hoffman	Czechoslovakia	3:45.4	Q
5	Arne Kvalheim	Norway	3:45.7	
6	Oleg Rayko	Soviet Union	3:46.7	
7	Roland Brehmer	Poland	3:49.0	
8	Henk Snepvangers	Netherlands	3:51.5	
9	Frank Murphy	Ireland	3:52.4	
10	Gani Alia	Albania	3:57.2	

==== Heat 2 ====
Rank	Name	Nationality	Time	Notes
1	André De Hertoghe	Belgium	3:40.7	CR NR Q
2	Bodo Tümmler	West Germany	3:41.1	Q
3	Jürgen May	East Germany	3:41.2	Q
4	Claude Nicolas	France	3:41.4	Q
5	Josef Odložil	Czechoslovakia	3:42.1	
6	Mart Vilt	Soviet Union	3:42.7	
7	Roman Tkaczyk	Poland	3:45.1	
8	Simo Važić	Yugoslavia	3:45.6	
9	Preben Glue	Denmark	3:45.9	
10	Gergely Szentivanyi	Hungary	3:47.2	

==== Heat 3 ====
Rank	Name	Nationality	Time	Notes
1	Jean Wadoux	France	3:45.3	Q
2	Alan Simpson	Great Britain	3:45.5	Q
3	Eugene Allonsius	Belgium	3:45.6	Q
4	Henryk Szordykowski	Poland	3:45.7	Q
5	Anders Gärderud	Sweden	3:45.8	
6	Hans-Rudolf Knill	Switzerland	3:46.3	
7	Franco Arese	Italy	3:46.3	
8	Stig Rekdal	Norway	3:46.3	
9	Wolf Schulte-Hillen	West Germany	3:46.5	
10	Mikhail Zhelobovskiy	Soviet Union	3:48.4	
11	Manuel de Oliveira	Portugal	3:48.9	
12	Muharrem Dalkılıç	Turkey	3:56.4	

== Participation ==
According to an unofficial count, 32 athletes from 20 countries participated in the event.

- Albania (1)
- Belgium (2)
- Czechoslovakia (2)
- Denmark (1)
- East Germany (1)
- France (3)
- Hungary (1)
- Ireland (1)
- Italy (1)
- Netherlands (1)
- Norway (2)
- Poland (3)
- Portugal (1)
- Soviet Union (3)
- Sweden (1)
- Switzerland (1)
- Turkey (1)
- Great Britain (2)
- West Germany (3)
- Yugoslavia (1)
