= 1970 European Athletics Indoor Championships – Men's 1500 metres =

The men's 1500 metres event at the 1970 European Athletics Indoor Championships was held on 15 March in Vienna.

== Medalists ==
Gold	Silver	Bronze
Henryk Szordykowski; Poland	Frank Murphy; Ireland	Volodymyr Panteley; Soviet Union

== Results ==
=== Heats ===
First 4 in each heat (Q) qualified directly for the final.

Rank	Heat	Name	Nationality	Time	Notes
1	1	Henryk Szordykowski	Poland	3:47.9	Q
2	1	Edgard Salvé	Belgium	3:48.2	Q
3	1	Frank Murphy	Ireland	3:48.4	Q
4	1	Knut Brustad	Norway	3:48.4	Q
5	1	Miodrag Vukomanović	Yugoslavia	3:49.8	
6	1	Mehmet Tümkan	Turkey	3:51.2	
7	1	Heinrich Händlhuber	Austria	3:51.6	
1	2	Volodymyr Panteley	Soviet Union	3:52.6	Q
2	2	Pierre Toussaint	France	3:52.6	Q
3	2	Jerzy Maluśki	Poland	3:52.7	Q
4	2	Ulf Högberg	Sweden	3:52.8	Q
5	2	Ivan Kováč	Czechoslovakia	3:52.9	
6	2	Dimko Deribeyev	Bulgaria	3:54.2	
7	2	Walter Wilkinson	Great Britain	3:55.4	

=== Final ===
Rank	Name	Nationality	Time	Notes
1st place, gold medalist(s)	Henryk Szordykowski	Poland	3:48.8	
2nd place, silver medalist(s)	Frank Murphy	Ireland	3:49.0	
3rd place, bronze medalist(s)	Volodymyr Panteley	Soviet Union	3:49.8	
4	Pierre Toussaint	France	3:50.2	
5	Ulf Högberg	Sweden	3:50.7	
6	Jerzy Maluśki	Poland	3:50.7	
7	Edgard Salvé	Belgium	3:54.5	
8	Knut Brustad	Norway	4:00.7	
