= 1973 European Athletics Indoor Championships – Men's 1500 metres =

The men's 1500 metres event at the 1973 European Athletics Indoor Championships was held on 10 and 11 March in Rotterdam.

== Medalists ==
Gold	Silver	Bronze
Henryk Szordykowski; Poland	Herman Mignon; Belgium	Klaus-Peter Justus; East Germany

== Results ==
=== Heats ===
Held on 10 March.

First 3 from each heat (Q) and the next 2 fastest (q) qualified for the final.

Rank	Heat	Name	Nationality	Time	Notes
1	1	Henryk Szordykowski	Poland	3:43.83	Q
2	1	Herman Mignon	Belgium	3:43.99	Q
3	1	Klaus-Peter Justus	East Germany	3:44.12	Q
4	1	Haico Scharn	Netherlands	3:44.45	q
5	1	Mikhail Ulimov	Soviet Union	3:44.48	q
6	1	Ivan Kováč	Czechoslovakia	3:44.58	
7	2	Jürgen Hemmerling	East Germany	3:44.86	Q
8	2	Włodzimierz Staszak	Poland	3:45.56	Q
9	2	Bram Wassenaar	Netherlands	3:45.72	Q
10	2	Edgard Salvé	Belgium	3:45.81	
11	1	Roelof Veld	Netherlands	3:45.85	
12	2	Vladimir Yarovenko	Soviet Union	3:48.37	
13	1	Jean-Louis Benoît	France	3:48.98	
14	2	Christian Collisy	West Germany	3:49.42	
15	2	Juan Borraz	Spain	3:54.82	
16	2	Gerd Larsen	Denmark	4:00.97	

=== Final ===
Held on 11 March.

Rank	Name	Nationality	Time	Notes
1st place, gold medalist(s)	Henryk Szordykowski	Poland	3:43.01	
2nd place, silver medalist(s)	Herman Mignon	Belgium	3:43.16	
3rd place, bronze medalist(s)	Klaus-Peter Justus	East Germany	3:43.36	
4	Jürgen Hemmerling	East Germany	3:43.59	
5	Mikhail Ulimov	Soviet Union	3:44.33	
6	Haico Scharn	Netherlands	3:44.45	
7	Bram Wassenaar	Netherlands	3:44.98	
8	Włodzimierz Staszak	Poland	3:45.75	
