= 1969 European Indoor Games – Men's 1500 metres =

The men's 1500 metres event at the 1969 European Indoor Games was held on 9 March in Belgrade.

== Medalists ==
Gold	Silver	Bronze
Edgard Salvé; Belgium	Knut Brustad; Norway	Walter Wilkinson; Great Britain

== Results ==
=== Heats ===
First 3 from each heat (Q) and the next 2 fastest qualified for the final.

Rank	Heat	Name	Nationality	Time	Notes
1	1	Knut Brustad	Norway	3:56.8	Q
2	1	Gianni Del Buono	Italy	3:57.1	Q
3	1	Jerzy Maluśki	Poland	3:57.2	Q
4	1	Petr Blaha	Czechoslovakia	3:57.2	
5	1	Karl-Heinz Schirmeier	West Germany	3:57.2	
1	2	Edgard Salvé	Belgium	3:45.4	Q
2	2	Ivan Jokić	Yugoslavia	3:45.6	Q
3	2	Walter Wilkinson	Great Britain	3:45.8	Q
4	2	Arnd Krüger	West Germany	3:48.1	q
5	2	Pierre Viaux	France	3:50.0	q

=== Final ===
Rank	Name	Nationality	Time	Notes
1st place, gold medalist(s)	Edgard Salvé	Belgium	3:45.9	
2nd place, silver medalist(s)	Knut Brustad	Norway	3:46.2	
3rd place, bronze medalist(s)	Walter Wilkinson	Great Britain	3:46.4	
4	Gianni Del Buono	Italy	3:46.9	
5	Ivan Jokić	Yugoslavia	3:51.4	
6	Jerzy Maluśki	Poland	3:52.3	
7	Arnd Krüger	West Germany	4:00.7	
	Pierre Viaux	France	DNF	
