= Athletics at the 1967 Summer Universiade – Men's 1500 metres =

The men's 1500 metres event at the 1967 Summer Universiade was held at the National Olympic Stadium in Tokyo on 31 August and 1 September 1967.

== Medalists ==
Gold	Silver	Bronze
Bodo Tümmler; West Germany	Dave Bailey; Canada	Gianni Del Buono; Italy

== Results ==
=== Heats ===
Rank	Heat	Athlete	Nationality	Time	Notes
1	1	Laurie Toogood	Australia	3:48.3	Q
2	1	Dave Bailey	Canada	3:48.6	Q
3	1	Francesco Arese	Italy	3:48.9	Q
4	1	Wolf Schulte-Hillen	West Germany	3:49.1	Q
5	1	Susumu Noro	Japan	3:49.2	Q
6	1	Tony Ashton	Great Britain	3:49.3	
7	1	Matti Tuura	Finland	3:49.9	
8	1	Jean-Gilbert Beavogui	France	3:54.4	
1	2	Bodo Tümmler	West Germany	3:48.7	Q
2	2	Hiroshi Hosokawa	Japan	3:49.0	Q
3	2	Gianni Del Buono	Italy	3:49.0	Q
4	2	Mike Tagg	Great Britain	3:49.0	Q
5	2	Ray Haswell	Canada	3:49.1	Q
6	2	Pierre Viaux	France	3:49.1	
7	2	Tira Klai-Angtong	Thailand	4:06.8	

=== Final ===
Rank	Name	Nationality	Time	Notes
1st place, gold medalist(s)	Bodo Tümmler	West Germany	3:43.4	UR
2nd place, silver medalist(s)	Dave Bailey	Canada	3:43.5	
3rd place, bronze medalist(s)	Gianni Del Buono	Italy	3:44.0	
4	Laurie Toogood	Australia	3:46.6	
5	Mike Tagg	Great Britain	3:46.7	
6	Ray Haswell	Canada	3:47.7	
7	Francesco Arese	Italy	3:48.6	
8	Wolf Schulte-Hillen	West Germany	3:50.4	
9	Hiroshi Hosokawa	Japan	3:51.5	
10	Susumu Noro	Japan	3:52.3	
