= John Kirkbride =

John Kirkbride is the name of

- John Kirkbride (musician) (born 1946), Scottish guitarist and songwriter
- John Kirkbride (athlete) (born 1947), British middle-distance runner, participated in 1971 European Athletics Championships – Men's 1500 metres
