= Athletics at the 1965 Summer Universiade – Men's 1500 metres =

Running event

The men's 1500 metres event at the 1965 Summer Universiade was held at the People's Stadium in Budapest on 28 and 29 August 1965.

== Medalists ==
Gold	Silver	Bronze
Bodo Tümmler; West Germany	Andy Green; Great Britain	Zbigniew Wójcik; Poland

== Results ==
=== Heats ===
Rank	Heat	Athlete	Nationality	Time	Notes
1	1	Andy Green	Great Britain	3:50.5	Q
2	1	Volker Tulzer	Austria	3:50.8	Q
3	1	Zoltan Vamoș	Romania	3:50.8	Q
4	1	Masayuki Aoba	Japan	3:50.8	Q
5	1	Francesco Arese	Italy	3:51.0	
6	1	Jan Čtvrtečka	Czechoslovakia	3:54.2	
7	1	Ioannis Hrisanthopoulos	Greece	3:55.5	
8	1	Kazimierz Wojtasik	Poland	4:04.8	
1	2	Klaus Prenner	West Germany	3:53.5	Q
2	2	Rudolf Klaban	Austria	3:53.6	Q
3	2	Gianni Del Buono	Italy	3:53.7	Q
4	2	Constantin Blotiu	Romania	3:53.7	Q
5	2	Dave Bailey	Canada	3:54.0	
6	2	John Jackson	Great Britain	3:54.0	
7	2	Keisuke Sawaki	Japan	3:54.8	
8	2	François Lacour	France	3:55.1	
9	2	János Aradi	Hungary	3:55.4	
10	2	Virgilio González	Spain	3:56.5	
1	3	Bodo Tümmler	West Germany	3:50.3	Q
2	3	Zbigniew Wójcik	Poland	3:50.5	Q
3	3	Béla Szekeres	Hungary	3:50.5	Q
4	3	Jorge González	Spain	3:51.0	Q
5	3	Hanspeter Born	Switzerland	3:51.4	
6	3	Gérard Legrange	France	3:52.0	
7	3	Hylke Van der Val	Canada	3:53.5	
8	3	Norbert Haupert	Luxembourg	3:54.0	
9	3	Vladimír Balšánek	Czechoslovakia	3:56.2	

=== Final ===
Rank	Name	Nationality	Time	Notes
1st place, gold medalist(s)	Bodo Tümmler	West Germany	3:46.2	
2nd place, silver medalist(s)	Andy Green	Great Britain	3:46.7	
3rd place, bronze medalist(s)	Zbigniew Wójcik	Poland	3:47.3	
4	Volker Tulzer	Austria	3:47.4	
5	Klaus Prenner	West Germany	3:47.7	
6	Masayuki Aoba	Japan	3:48.1	
7	Constantin Blotiu	Romania	3:48.1	
8	Zoltan Vamoș	Romania	3:48.6	
9	Gianni Del Buono	Italy	3:48.7	
10	Jorge González	Spain	3:48.9	
11	Béla Szekeres	Hungary	3:49.3	
	Rudolf Klaban	Austria	DNS	
