= Athletics at the 1970 British Commonwealth Games – Men's 800 metres =

Men's 800 metres at the 1970 British Commonwealth Games
- Venue: Meadowbank Stadium, Edinburgh
- Dates: 22, 24 and 25 July

Medalists
gold medal	Robert Ouko	Kenya
silver medal	Ben Cayenne	Trinidad and Tobago
bronze medal	Bill Smart	Canada

The men's 800 metres event at the 1970 British Commonwealth Games was held on 22, 24 and 25 July at the Meadowbank Stadium in Edinburgh, Scotland. It was the first time that the metric distance was contested at the Games, replacing the 880 yards event.

== Medalists ==
Medallists
Gold	Silver	Bronze
Robert Ouko; Kenya	Ben Cayenne; Trinidad and Tobago	Bill Smart; Canada

== Results ==
=== Heats ===
==== Qualification for semifinals ====
The first 4 in each heat (Q) qualified directly for the semifinals.

Heats results (not complete)
Rank	Heat	Name	Nationality	Time	Notes
1	1	Ralph Doubell	Australia	1:49.40	Q
4	1	Musa Dogon Yaro	Nigeria	1:50.0	Q
5	1	Richard Nandolo	Malawi	1:50.1	
6	1	Phil Lewis	Wales	1:52.0	
	1	Fred Sowerby	Antigua and Barbuda	DNS	
	1	Wilbert Moss	Bahamas	DNS	
3	2	Chris Fisher	Australia	1:50.16	Q
5	2	Muhammed Younis	Pakistan	1:50.8	
6	2	Jaiye Abidoye	Nigeria	1:51.0	
	2	Patrick Francis	Antigua and Barbuda	DNS	
5	3	Keith Falla	Guernsey	1:50.2	
6	3	Naftali Bon	Kenya	1:50.8	
7	3	Hector Romero	Gibraltar	2:07.4	
	3	Leslie Miller	Bahamas	DNS	
5	4	Norman Trerise	Canada	1:52.5	
6	4	Peter Njera	Malawi	1:55.1	
7	4	Gerard Gangaram	Mauritius	1:57.3	
	4	Tony Harper	Bermuda	DNS	

=== Semifinals ===
==== Qualification for final ====
The first 4 in each semifinal (Q) qualified directly for the final.

Semifinal results
Rank	Heat	Name	Nationality	Time	Notes
1	1	Robert Ouko	Kenya	1:49.0	Q
2	1	Colin Campbell	England	1:49.3	Q
3	1	Chris Fisher	Australia	1:49.44	Q
4	1	Martin Winbolt-Lewis	England	1:49.8	Q
5	1	Michael MacLean	Scotland	1:49.9	
6	1	Ergas Leps	Canada	1:50.2	
7	1	Bob Adams	Wales	1:50.3	
8	1	Neville Myton	Jamaica	1:50.4	
1	2	Ralph Doubell	Australia	1:49.10	Q
2	2	John Davies	England	1:49.1	Q
3	2	Bill Smart	Canada	1:49.3	Q
4	2	Ben Cayenne	Trinidad and Tobago	1:49.4	Q
5	2	Byron Dyce	Jamaica	1:49.7	
6	2	Thomas Saisi	Kenya	1:50.9	
7	2	John Greatrex	Wales	1:51.5	
	2	Musa Dogon Yaro	Nigeria	DNS	

=== Final ===
Final results
Rank	Name	Nationality	Time	Notes
1st place, gold medalist(s)	Robert Ouko	Kenya	1:46.89	
2nd place, silver medalist(s)	Ben Cayenne	Trinidad and Tobago	1:47.42	
3rd place, bronze medalist(s)	Bill Smart	Canada	1:47.43	
4	Chris Fisher	Australia	1:47.78	
5	John Davies	England	1:47.7	
6	Ralph Doubell	Australia	1:47.86	
7	Martin Winbolt-Lewis	England	1:48.1	
8	Colin Campbell	England	1:48.2	
