= Kirkbride =

Kirkbride may refer to:

- Kirkbride, Cumbria, a village in England
- Alec Kirkbride (1897–1978), British diplomat
- Anne Kirkbride (1954–2015), British soap opera actress
- John Kirkbride (musician) (born 1946), Scottish guitarist and songwriter
- John Kirkbride (athlete) (born 1947), British middle-distance runner
- Julie Kirkbride (born 1960), British MP for Bromsgrove
- Ronald Kirkbride (1912-1973), Canadian writer
- Thomas Story Kirkbride (1809–1883), American psychiatrist
  - Kirkbride Plan, an architectural design devised by Thomas Story Kirkbride
- The B. B. Kirkbride Bible Company, Inc., publisher of the Thompson Chain-Reference Bible.
