= 1969 European Indoor Games – Men's 800 metres =

The men's 800 metres event at the 1969 European Indoor Games was held on 8 March in Belgrade.

== Medalists ==
Gold	Silver	Bronze
Dieter Fromm; East Germany	Henryk Szordykowski; Poland	Noel Carroll; Ireland

== Results ==
=== Heats ===
First 4 from each heat (Q) qualified directly for the final.

Rank	Heat	Name	Nationality	Time	Notes
1	1	Henryk Szordykowski	Poland	1:51.0	Q
2	1	Gerd Larsen	Denmark	1:51.1	Q
3	1	Noel Carroll	Ireland	1:51.4	Q
4	1	Robert Adams	Great Britain	1:51.7	Q
5	1	Radovan Piplović	Yugoslavia	1:54.2	
6	1	Arnd Krüger	West Germany	1:59.7	
1	2	Dieter Fromm	East Germany	1:50.8	Q
2	2	Jože Međimurec	Yugoslavia	1:51.1	Q
3	2	Ján Šišovský	Czechoslovakia	1:51.3	Q
4	2	Pierre Toussaint	France	1:51.5	Q
5	2	Juan Borraz	Spain	1:52.0	
6	2	Gilbert Van Manshoven	Belgium	1:53.0	

=== Final ===
Rank	Name	Nationality	Time	Notes
1st place, gold medalist(s)	Dieter Fromm	East Germany	1:46.6	WB
2nd place, silver medalist(s)	Henryk Szordykowski	Poland	1:47.1	
3rd place, bronze medalist(s)	Noel Carroll	Ireland	1:47.6	
4	Robert Adams	Great Britain	1:49.2	
5	Pierre Toussaint	France	1:50.5	
6	Gerd Larsen	Denmark	1:51.2	
7	Jože Međimurec	Yugoslavia	1:51.9	
8	Ján Šišovský	Czechoslovakia	1:52.0	
