= 1968 European Indoor Games – Men's 800 metres =

The men's 800 metres event at the 1968 European Indoor Games was held on 9 March in Madrid.

== Medalists ==
Gold	Silver	Bronze
Noel Carroll; Ireland	Alberto Estebán; Spain	Sergey Kryuchok; Soviet Union

== Results ==
=== Heats ===
First 3 from each heat (Q) qualified directly for the final.

Rank	Heat	Name	Nationality	Time	Notes
1	1	Alberto Estebán	Spain	1:51.19	Q
2	1	Mikhail Zhelobovskiy	Soviet Union	1:51.5	Q
3	1	Noel Carroll	Ireland	1:51.9	Q
4	1	Pavel Hruška	Czechoslovakia	1:52.6	
5	2	Sergey Kryuchok	Soviet Union	1:57.58	Q
6	2	Gerd Larsen	Denmark	1:57.7	Q
7	2	Jan Kasal	Czechoslovakia	1:58.1	Q
8	2	Jože Međimurec	Yugoslavia	1:58.3	

=== Final ===
Rank	Name	Nationality	Time	Notes
1st place, gold medalist(s)	Noel Carroll	Ireland	1:56.66	
2nd place, silver medalist(s)	Alberto Estebán	Spain	1:57.7	
3rd place, bronze medalist(s)	Sergey Kryuchok	Soviet Union	1:58.1	
4	Gerd Larsen	Denmark	1:58.3	
5	Mikhail Zhelobovskiy	Soviet Union	1:58.7	
6	Jan Kasal	Czechoslovakia	1:59.2	
