= 1974 European Athletics Indoor Championships – Men's 1500 metres =

Men's 1500 metres event at the 1974 European Athletics Indoor Championships

The men's 1500 metres event at the 1974 European Athletics Indoor Championships was held on 10 March in Gothenburg.

== Results ==
Rank	Name	Nationality	Time	Notes
1st place, gold medalist(s)	Henryk Szordykowski	Poland	3:41.78	
2nd place, silver medalist(s)	Thomas Wessinghage	West Germany	3:42.04	
3rd place, bronze medalist(s)	Włodzimierz Staszak	Poland	3:43.48	
4	Petre Lupan	Romania	3:44.67	
5	Per-Erik Hagberg	Sweden	3:47.00	
6	Ágúst Ásgeirsson	Iceland	3:55.27	
