= John Whetton =

British middle-distance runner (born 1941)

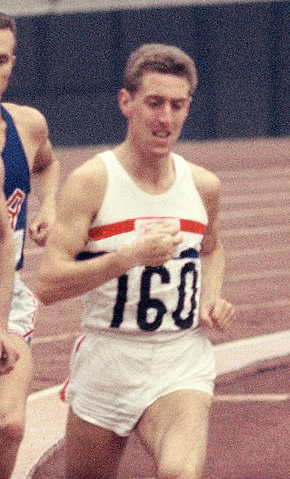
- Whetton at the 1964 Olympics

Personal information
- Born: 6 September 1941 (age 84) Mansfield, Nottinghamshire, England
- Height: 1.79 m (5 ft 10 in)
- Weight: 68 kg (150 lb)

Sport
- Sport: Athletics
- Event: 1500 m
- Club: Sutton-in-Ashfield Harriers

Achievements and titles
- Personal best: 1500 m – 3:39.45 (1969)
Medal record
Men's athletics
Representing Great Britain
European Championships
Gold medal – first place	1969 Athens	1500 m
European Indoor Championships
Gold medal – first place	1966 Dortmund	1500 m
Gold medal – first place	1967 Prague	1500 m
Gold medal – first place	1968 Madrid	1500 m
Summer Universiade
Gold medal – first place	1963 Porto Alegre	1500m

John Whetton (born 6 September 1941) is a retired British middle-distance runner. He is best noted for winning gold in the 1500 metres at the 1969 European Athletics Championships and reaching the 1500 metre final in both the 1964 and 1968 Summer Olympics.

== Biography ==
Whetton ran amateur athletics for local club Sutton-in-Ashfield Harriers. One of Whetton's first titles was the gold in 1500 metres at the 1963 Summer Universiade held at Porto Alegre, Brazil. In 1964 Whetton qualified to represent Great Britain at the 1964 Summer Olympic Games in Tokyo, and was one of three British competitors who ran the 1500 metres; the other two being William McKim and fellow Harriers club-mate Alan Simpson. Whetton qualified through the first heat, coming third with a time of 3:44.2. He and Simpson both qualified to the semi-finals and then the finals, with Whetton taking the final slot as the fastest non-qualifying athlete. In the final Whetton finished eighth out of nine, recording a time of 3:42.4, while Simpson ended fourth.

In 1966 Whetton participated in the European Indoor Games taking his first major gold medal when he won the race by nearly three seconds over second placed Oleg Rayko. Whetton managed to retain the European Indoor title over the next two years, at Prague and Madrid.

Whetton became the British 1 mile champion after winning the British AAA Championships title at the 1968 AAA Championships.

Whetton again represented Great Britain in the altitude influenced 1968 Summer Olympics in Mexico City, and again qualified for the final. In the final Whetton finished fifth, though a full four seconds outside the medal places. His final major medal came in the 1969 European Athletics Championships when he won the 1500 metres in Athens. In a close final Whetton beat Ireland's Francis Murphy to take the gold.

He represented England in the 1,500 metres, at the 1970 British Commonwealth Games in Edinburgh, Scotland.
