= 1972 European Athletics Indoor Championships – Men's 1500 metres =

The men's 1500 metres event at the 1972 European Athletics Indoor Championships was held on 12 March in Grenoble.

== Results ==
Rank	Name	Nationality	Time	Notes
1st place, gold medalist(s)	Jacques Boxberger	France	3:45.66	
2nd place, silver medalist(s)	Spilios Zakharopoulos	Greece	3:46.08	
3rd place, bronze medalist(s)	Jürgen May	West Germany	3:46.42	
4	Juan Borraz	Spain	3:47.16	
5	Bram Wassenaar	Netherlands	3:47.61	
6	Jan Prasek	Poland	3:47.74	
7	Viktor Semyashkin	Soviet Union	3:47.76	
8	Herman Mignon	Belgium	3:50.73	
