= 1965 AAA Championships =

Outdoor track and field competition

- Dates: 9–10 July 1965
- Host city: London, England
- Venue: White City Stadium
- Level: Senior
- Type: Outdoor

The 1965 AAA Championships was the 1965 edition of the annual outdoor track and field competition organised by the Amateur Athletic Association (AAA). It was held from 9 to 10 July 1965 at White City Stadium in London, England.

== Summary ==
The Championships covered two days of competition. The marathon was held in Port Talbot and the decathlon event was held in Loughborough.

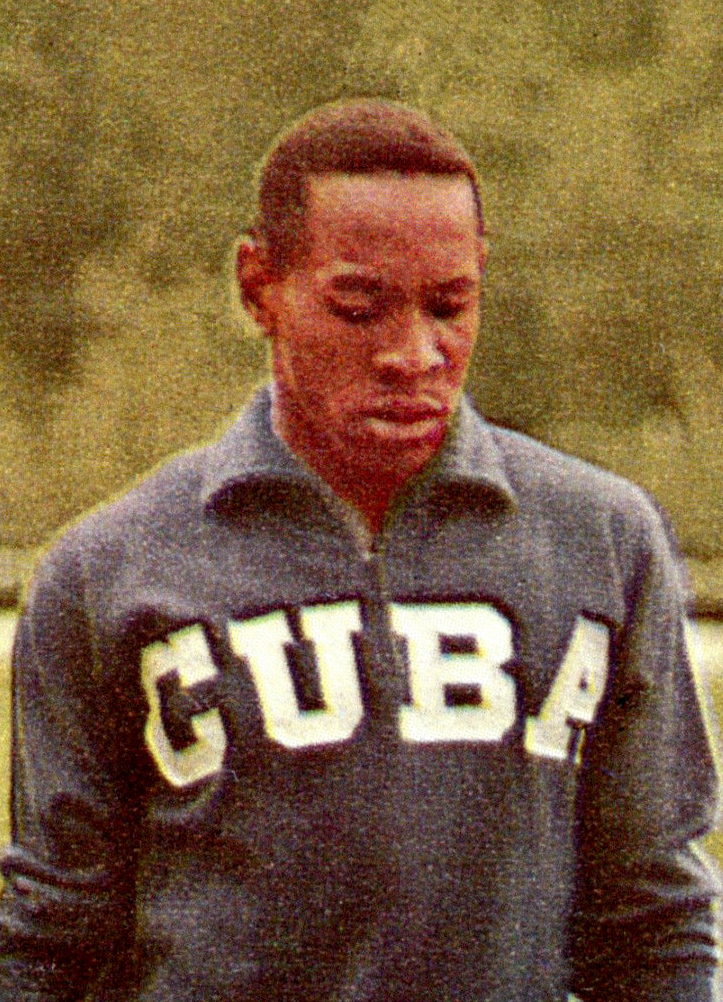
Enrique Figeurola retained his 100 yards title

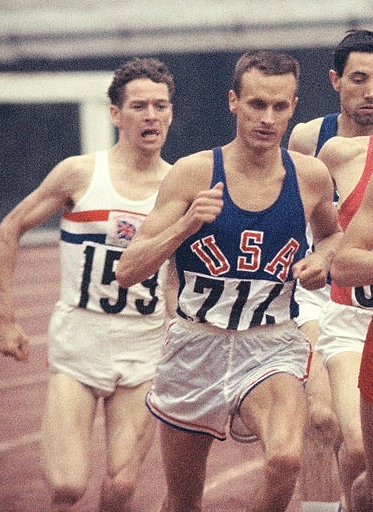
Alan Simpson (left) won his 3rd AAA title

== Results ==
Event	Gold		Silver		Bronze	
100 yards	(Cuba) Enrique Figuerola	9.64	Barrie Kelly	9.84	(Scotland) Menzies Campbell	9.96
220 yards	Pat Morrison	21.84	(Scotland) Menzies Campbell	21.92	(Hungary) László Mihályfi	22.00
440 yards	(United States) Mike Larrabee	47.60	John Adey	47.64	Mike Fitzgerald	47.78
880 yards	(United States) Tom Farrell	1:49.54	Chris Carter	1:49.94	John Boulter	1:50.00
1 mile	Alan Simpson	4:01.94	Andy Green	4:02.54	Walter Wilkinson	4:02.88
3 miles	(Australia) Ron Clarke	12:52.26 WR	(United States) Gerry Lindgren	13:04.0	(Hungary) Lajos Mecser	13:07.54
6 miles	(Tunisia) Mohamed Gammoudi	27:38.12	Ron Hill	27:40.90	Mike Bullivant	27:43.76
10 miles	Ron Hill	48:56.0	(Scotland) Jim Alder	48:56.0	Gerry North	50:09.8
marathon	Bill Adcocks	2:16:50	Brian Kilby	2:17:34	Juan Taylor	2:18:57
steeplechase	Maurice Herriott	8:41.0	Ernie Pomfret	8:48.0	John May	8:51.4
120y hurdles	Laurie Taitt	14.3	Rodney Morrod	14.3	Mike Parker	14.3
440y hurdles	(United States) Rex Cawley	50.92	John Cooper	51.45	John Sherwood	51.47
2 miles walk	Paul Nihill	13:20.0	Malcolm Tolley	13:50.0	Ron Wallwork	13:54.6
7 miles walk	Paul Nihill	51:54.4	Ron Wallwork	52:42.0	Peter Fullager	53:18.0
high jump	(Sweden) Kjell-Åke Nilsson	2.032	(Sweden) Stig Pettersson	2.032	(Nigeria) Joseph Kadiri	1.981
pole vault	(United States) Paul Wilson	4.72	(Sweden) Tapio Mertanen	4.57	Trevor Burton	4.27
long jump	Fred Alsop	7.38	(Scotland) Andrew Mollett	7.31	Geoffrey Beales	7.27
triple jump	Fred Alsop	15.88	(Norway) Martin Jensen	15.42	(Norway) Kjell Arthur Paulsen	15.10
shot put	(Hungary) Vilmos Varjú	19.02	(Norway) Bjørn Bang Andersen	17.45	Alan Carter	17.43
discus throw	(Sweden) Lars Haglund	53.94	(Scotland) Mike Lindsay	51.98	Bill Tancred	48.63
hammer throw	(Hungary) Gyula Zsivótzky	68.14	(Austria) Klaus Winter	59.63	Howard Payne	59.55
javelin throw	Dave Travis	73.76	John McSorley	71.26	Clive Loveland	71.17
decathlon	(Scotland) Norman Foster	6840 NR	Derek Clarke	6817	Dave Travis	6791 NR

== See also ==
- 1965 WAAA Championships
