= Ray Smedley =

British middle-distance runner

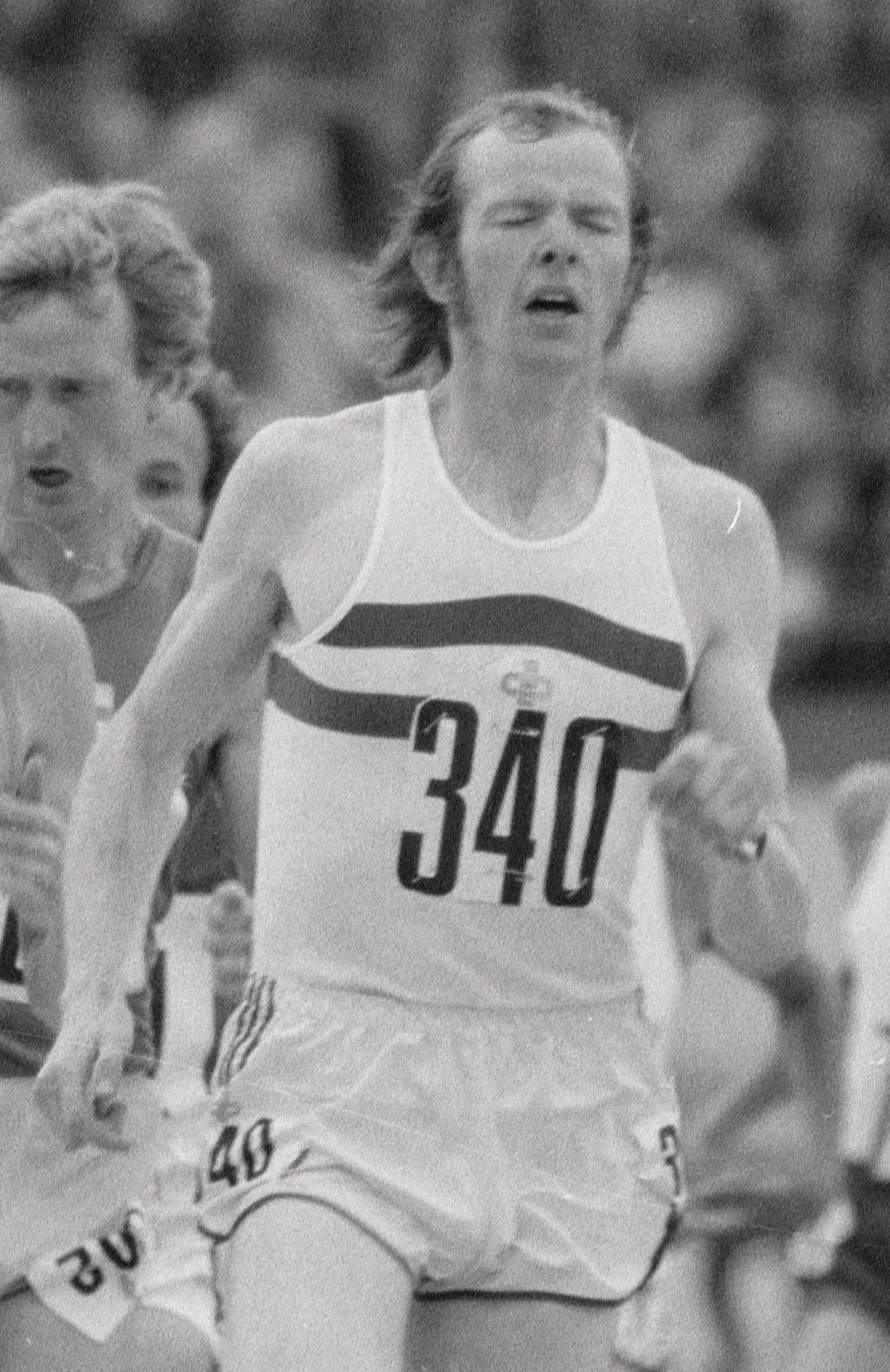
- Smedley competing in the 1974 European Athletics Championships

Personal information
- Nationality: British (English)
- Born: 3 September 1951 (age 74) Sutton Coldfield, Warwickshire, England
- Height: 181 cm (5 ft 11 in)
- Weight: 70 kg (154 lb)

Sport
- Sport: Athletics
- Event: Middle/long-distance
- Club: Birchfield Harriers
Medal record
Men's athletics
Representing Great Britain
European Indoor Championships
Bronze medal – third place	1976 Munich	3000 m

Raymond John Smedley (born 3 September 1951) is a retired British middle to long-distance runner who competed at the 1972 Summer Olympics.

== Biography ==
Smedley finished second behind Peter Stewart in the 1500 metres event at the 1972 AAA Championships. Shortly afterwards Smedley represented Great Britain and competed in the men's 1500 metres at the 1972 Olympics Games in Munich.

After stepping up in distance he represented England in the marathon event, at the 1982 Commonwealth Games in Brisbane, Australia.
