= Billy Fordjour =

Ghanaian middle-distance runner

Personal information
- Full name: William Fordjour
- Nationality: Ghanaian
- Born: 26 March 1948 (age 78)

Sport
- Sport: Middle-distance running
- Event: 1500 metres

William Fordjour (born 26 March 1948) is a Ghanaian middle-distance runner. He competed in the men's 1500 metres at the 1972 Summer Olympics but collided with the United States' Jim Ryun as both trailed in the last 500 metres of a preliminary heat on September 8 and did not qualify for the final. He was a senior at Howard Payne College at the time of the race.
