= Werner Meier =

Swiss middle-distance runner

Personal information
- Nationality: Swiss
- Born: 31 May 1949 (age 77)
- Height: 172 cm (5 ft 8 in)
- Weight: 57 kg (126 lb)

Sport
- Sport: Athletics
- Event: Middle-distance running
- Club: BTV Aarau

Werner Meier (born 31 May 1949) is a Swiss middle-distance runner. He competed in the men's 1500 metres at the 1972 Summer Olympics.

Meier finished third behind Brendan Foster in the 5,000 metres event at the British 1974 AAA Championships.
