= Chris Fisher (athlete) =

Australian middle-distance runner

Personal information
- Full name: Christopher Fisher
- Nationality: Australian
- Born: 2 October 1949 (age 76)

Sport
- Sport: Middle-distance running
- Event: 1500 metres

Christopher Fisher (born 2 October 1949) is an Australian middle-distance runner. He competed in the men's 1500 metres at the 1972 Summer Olympics. Fisher also competed in the men's 800 metres and men's 1500 metres at the 1970 British Commonwealth Games.

Fisher competed for the UTEP Miners track and field team in the NCAA.
