= Hailu Ebba =

Ethiopian middle-distance runner

Personal information
- Nationality: Ethiopian
- Born: 12 December 1950 (age 75)

Sport
- Sport: Middle-distance running
- Event: 1500 metres

Hailu Ebba (born 12 December 1950) is an Ethiopian middle-distance runner. He competed in the men's 1500 metres at the 1972 Summer Olympics.

Ebba competed for the Oregon State Beavers track and field team in the NCAA. He later became an anesthesiologist at Cedars-Sinai Medical Center in California.
