= David Bailey (pharmacologist) =

Canadian runner and pharmacologist (1945–2022)

Personal information
- Born: March 17, 1945 Toronto, Ontario, Canada
- Died: August 27, 2022 (aged 77) London, Ontario, Canada
- Spouse: Barbara Bailey
- Children: 3
Medal record
Men's Athletics
Representing Canada
Pan American Games
Bronze medal – third place	1967 Winnipeg	1.500 metres
World University Games
Silver medal – second place	1967 Tokyo	1.500 metres

David George Bailey (March 17, 1945 – August 27, 2022) was a Canadian track and field athlete, and subsequently a recognized pharmacologist, who pioneered the research of grapefruit–drug interactions.

== Athletic career ==
Bailey represented Canada at the 1968 Summer Olympics in the men's 1,500 metres. He was the first Canadian to run the mile in less than 4 minutes (3:59.1) in San Diego, CA on June 11, 1966 and the first Canadian to run the mile in less than 4 minutes in Canada (3:57.7) in Toronto on July 22, 1967. A resident of North York, Ontario, he won the bronze medal in this event at the 1967 Pan American Games and the silver medal in this event at the 1967 World University Games. He was two-time Canadian Universities Track and Field Athlete of Year (1965, 1967) and two-time inductee into the University of Toronto Sports Hall of Fame (individually 1998 and team 2003). He was a member of 9 Canadian national track and field teams, competing at:

- World University Games, Budapest 1965,
- Commonwealth Games, Kingston, Jamaica, 1966,
- Pan American Games, Winnipeg, 1967,
- Commonwealth vs. USA, Los Angeles, 1967,
- World University Games, Tokyo 1967,
- Pre-Olympic Games, Mexico City, 1967,
- Soviet Union Tour, 1968,
- European Tour, 1968,
- Olympic Games, Mexico City, 1968.

== Academic career ==
Bailey completed undergraduate studies in Pharmacy (1968) and graduate work in Pharmacology (M.Sc. 1970; Ph.D. 1973) at the University of Toronto. After post-doctoral training in Pharmacology at the University of Saskatchewan and work in drug development for the pharmaceutical industry, he returned to academia in 1986 at the University of Western Ontario, Canada. He was a full Professor in the Departments of Physiology & Pharmacology and Medicine. His research focused on mechanistic and translational clinical pharmacological investigations related to drug interactions.

Bailey's notable publication of grapefruit–drug interactions has been cited more than 300 times. Grapefruit decreased drug metabolism in humans, which likely represented the first clinical example of a food producing such an effect. Clinically, the concern is that a single judicious amount of grapefruit ingested even many hours beforehand would noticeably boost oral drug bioavailability and cause overdose toxicity. Research findings have demonstrated that grapefruit produced a clinically relevant interaction with more than 40 medications. Formal product information for a number of highly prescribed or essential medications now warn about the risk of a grapefruit-induced adverse drug interaction. A label stating, "Do NOT take with Grapefruit Juice" is often affixed to prescription vials.

Bailey's research was prominently discussed in such prestigious journals as Nature Medicine and the New England Journal of Medicine. A review article of his on the topic of grapefruit–drug interactions was republished in a special 2004 Anniversary Edition of the British Journal of Clinical Pharmacology, which reprinted only 14 publications that were considered of major importance over the past 30 years. A research study in the elderly received the William B Abrams Award from the American Society for Clinical Pharmacology & Therapeutics (1999). Bailey was the recipient of the Senior Investigator Award from the Canadian Society for Clinical Pharmacology (2005). Moreover, this research is now well known to the public through numerous articles in the lay press. Some were in the most influential and trusted publications including The New York Times (March 21, 2006), National Geographic (March 2007) and the Wall Street Journal (November 27, 2007). Thus, this research has received significant scientific, clinical and mainstream stature.

In later years, Bailey shifted the focus of his research slightly to assessing the effect of fruit juices on other potentially important mechanisms of drug absorption. Research found that grapefruit and other juices (orange and apple) inhibited a specific intestinal drug uptake transporter (organic anion transporting polypeptide 1A2; OATP1A2) to diminish oral drug absorption discernibly in humans. The initial publication in 2002, which has been cited more than 100 times, supported a new model of intestinal drug absorption and novel mechanism of food-drug interactions. Bailey showed that the major flavonoid in grapefruit, naringin, was an important clinically active inhibitor of intestinal OATP1A2. This appeared to be the first example of a single dietary constituent modulating drug transport in humans.

Bailey died in London, Ontario on August 27, 2022, at the age of 77.
