= John Davies (runner, born 1949) =

British sprinter (born 1949)

Personal information
- Nationality: British (English)
- Born: 17 January 1949 England
- Height: 184 cm (6 ft 0 in)
- Weight: 74 kg (163 lb)

Sport
- Sport: Athletics
- Event: Sprinting
- Club: Sale Harriers

John Davies (born 17 January 1949) is a former international sprinter who competed at the Commonwealth Games and was selected for the Olympic Games.

== Biography ==
Davies was a member of the Sale Harriers and specialised in middle distances, primarily the 800 metres and was the European junior record holder over the distance.

Davies became the British 880 yards champion as the highest British athlete at the 1968 AAA Championships. He finished runner-up behind Ireland's Noel Carroll. Shortly afterwards, in August 1968, he was selected for the 800 metres at the 1968 Summer Olympics in Mexico City. Davies was expected to challenge for a medal but unfortunately had to pull out because of a serious hamstring injury.

Davies represented the England team at the 1970 British Commonwealth Games in Edinburgh, Scotland, where he competed in the 800 metres event, reaching the final.
