= Klaus-Peter Justus =

German middle-distance runner

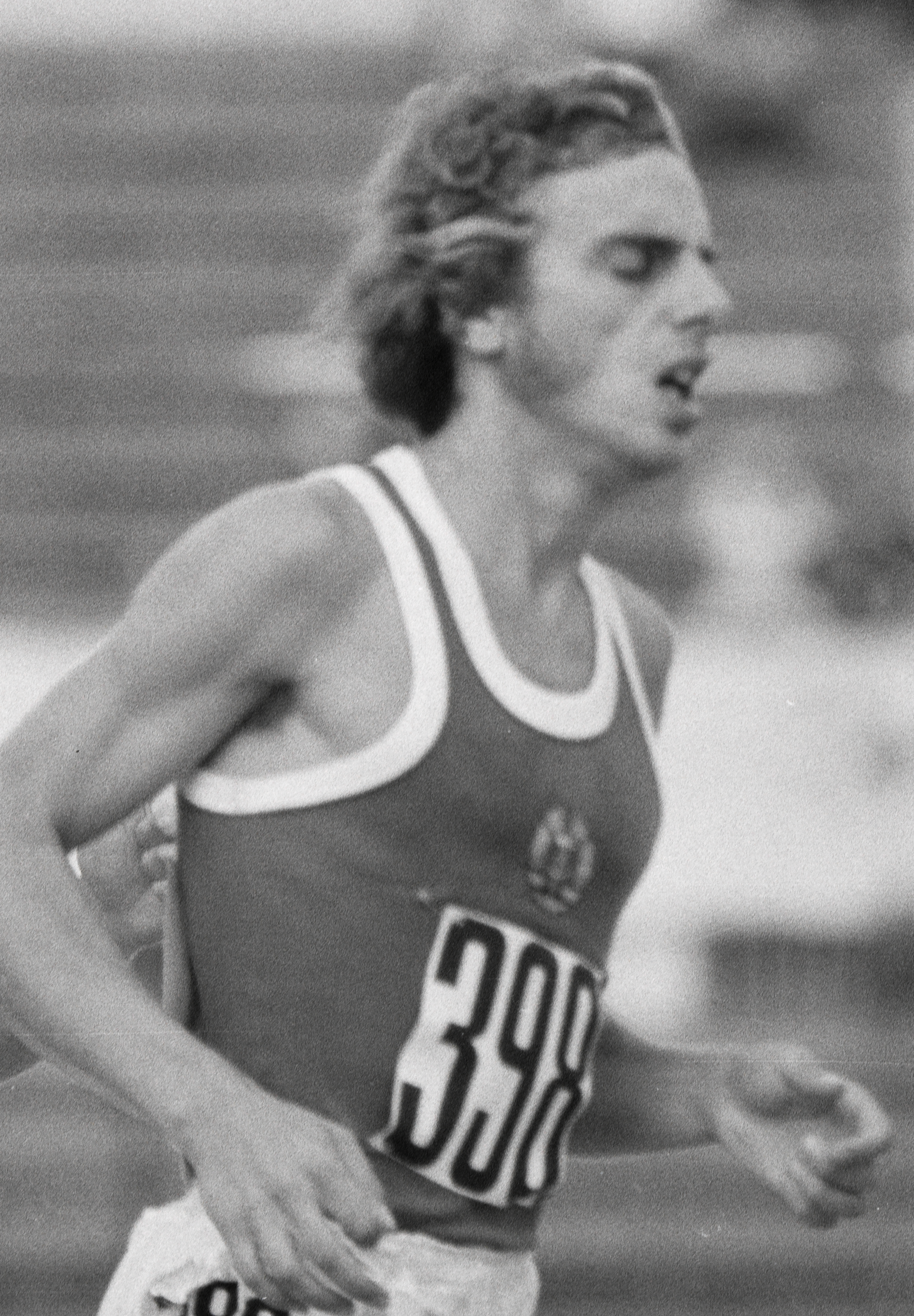
- Justus in 1974

Medal record

Men's athletics

Representing East Germany

European Championships
Gold medal – first place	1974 Rome	1500 m

European Indoor Championships
Bronze medal – third place	1973 Rotterdam	1500 m

Klaus-Peter Justus (born 1 July 1951 in Königsee, Thuringia) is a retired East German middle-distance runner who specialized in the 1500 metres.

He won the gold medals at the 1970 European Junior Championships and the 1974 European Championships, and the bronze medal at the 1973 European Indoor Championships. He competed at the 1972 Summer Olympics without reaching the final.

He competed for the club SC Motor Jena during his active career. His son Steffen Justus is also a successful triathlete and runner.
