= Henryk Szordykowski =

Polish middle-distance runner (1944–2022)

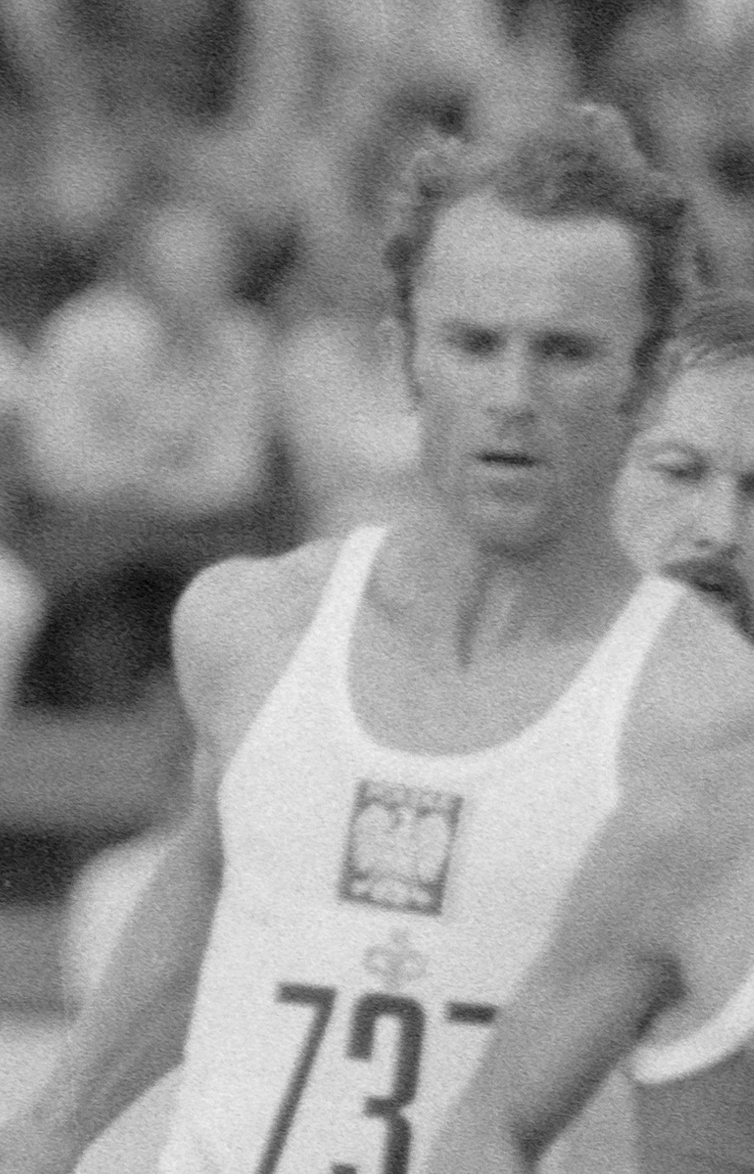
- Szordykowski in 1974

Medal record

Men's athletics

Representing Poland

European Championships
Silver medal – second place	1971 Helsinki	1500 m
Bronze medal – third place	1969 Athens	1500 m

European Indoor Championships
Gold medal – first place	1969 Belgrade	Medley relay
Gold medal – first place	1970 Vienna	1500 m
Gold medal – first place	1971 Sofia	1500 m
Gold medal – first place	1973 Rotterdam	1500 m
Gold medal – first place	1974 Gothenburg	1500 m
Silver medal – second place	1969 Belgrade	800 m

Henryk Jan Szordykowski (3 June 1944 – 25 December 2022) was a Polish runner who specialized in the 800 metres and 1500 metres.

He was born in Iłowo-Osada and represented the club Wawel Kraków. In his early career he finished eighth in the 1500 metres at the 1966 European Championships, At the 1968 Olympic Games he competed in the 800 metres event, failing to progress from the first round, and finished seventh in the final of the 1500 metres event. At the 1969 European Indoor Games, he won the silver medal in the 800 metres and a gold medal in the medley relay.

Then, in the 1500 metres he won a bronze medal at the 1969 European Championships and a silver at the 1971 European Championships. He won the gold at the 1970, 1971, 1973 and 1974 European Indoor Championships. At the 1972 Olympic Games he reached the semi-final of the 1500 metres event. He finished sixth in the 1500 metres at the 1975 European Indoor Championships.

He became Polish champion in the 800 metres in 1966, 1967 and 1969, and in the 1500 metres in 1968, 1971, 1972 and 1974. He became Polish indoor champion in the 1500 metres in 1974, and also American indoor champion in 1969 and 1971.

His personal best time in the 800 metres was 1:46.6 minutes, achieved in 1968. In the 1500 metres he had 3.38.2 minutes, achieved in August 1969 in Warsaw. He had 3.58.8 minutes in the mile run, achieved in July 1972 in Stockholm.

Szordykowski died on 25 December 2022, at the age of 78.

He was the brother of Zenon Szordykowski.

== International competitions ==
Year	Competition	Venue	Position	Event	Notes
Representing Poland
1966	European Championships	Budapest, Hungary	8th	1500 m	3:45.8
1968	Olympic Games	Mexico City, Mexico	6th (h)	800 m	3:46.69^{1}
1968	Olympic Games	Mexico City, Mexico	7th	1500 m	3:46.69
1969	European Indoor Games	Belgrade, Serbia	2nd	800 m	1:47.1
1969	European Championships	Athens, Greece	3rd	1500 m	3:39.87
1970	European Indoor Championships	Vienna, Austria	1st	1500 m	3:48.8
1971	European Indoor Championships	Sofia, Bulgaria	1st	1500 m	3:41.4
1971	European Championships	Helsinki, Finland	2nd	1500 m	3:38.73
1972	Olympic Games	Munich, West Germany	20th (sf)	1500 m	3:42.5
1973	European Indoor Championships	Rotterdam, Netherlands	1st	1500 m	3:43.01
1974	European Indoor Championships	Gothenburg, Sweden	1st	1500 m	3:41.78
1974	European Championships	Rome, Italy	16th (h)	1500 m	3:43.7
1975	European Indoor Championships	Katowice, Poland	6th	1500 m	3:55.4

^{1}Did not start in the semifinals.
