= Petre Lupan =

Romanian middle-distance runner

Personal information
- Nationality: Romanian
- Born: 12 June 1950 (age 76)

Sport
- Sport: Middle-distance running
- Event: 1500 metres

Petre Lupan (born 12 June 1950) is a Romanian middle-distance runner. He competed in the men's 1500 metres at the 1972 Summer Olympics.
