= Tony Polhill =

New Zealander middle-distance runner

Personal information
- Nationality: New Zealand
- Born: 15 December 1947 (age 78) Waipawa, New Zealand
- Height: 187 cm (6 ft 2 in)
- Weight: 77 kg (170 lb)

Sport
- Sport: Middle-distance running
- Event: 1500 metres
- Club: Auckland

Anthony Gifford Polhill (born 15 December 1947) is a New Zealand former middle-distance runner. He competed in the men's 1500 metres at the 1972 Summer Olympics.

Polhill won the British AAA Championships title in the 1500 metres event at the 1971 AAA Championships.
