= Shibrou Regassa =

Ethiopian middle-distance runner

Personal information
- Nationality: Ethiopian
- Born: 9 August 1944 (age 81)

Sport
- Sport: Middle-distance running
- Event: 800 metres

Shibrou Regassa (born 9 August 1944) is an Ethiopian middle-distance runner. He competed in the men's 800 metres at the 1972 Summer Olympics.
