= Włodzimierz Staszak =

Polish middle-distance runner

Medal record

Men's athletics

European Indoor Championships
Bronze medal – third place	1974 Gothenburg	1500 m

Włodzimierz Staszak (born 20 May 1948) is a retired Polish runner who specialized in the 1500 metres.

He finished eighth at the 1973 European Indoor Championships, and won the bronze medal at the 1974 European Indoor Championships. He became Polish indoor champion in the 1500 metres in 1973.
