= Jürgen May =

German middle-distance runner (born 1942)

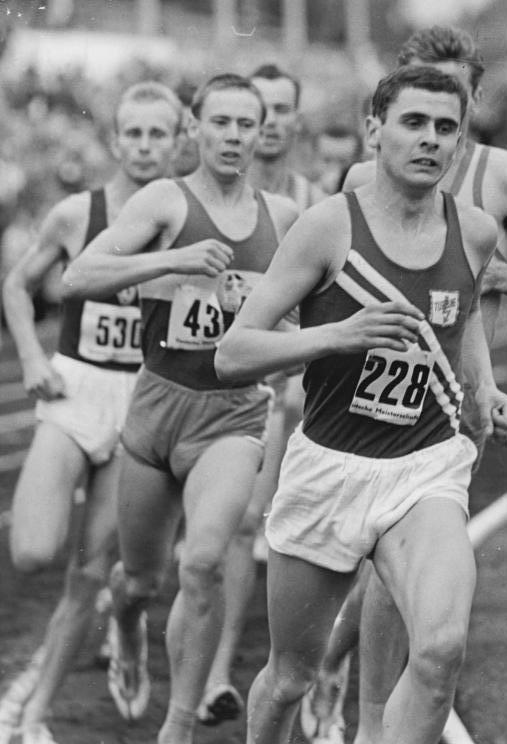
- Jürgen May (foreground) at the GDR-championships 1963.

Medal record

Men's athletics

Representing West Germany

European Indoor Championships
Bronze medal – third place	1972 Grenoble	1500 m

Jürgen May (born 18 June 1942 in Nordhausen, Thuringia) is a former middle-distance runner, who was a successful athlete and Olympic Games competitor, who escaped from the GDR to continue his career in the FRG.

== Successes in the GDR ==
- 1964: Qualified as a GDR representative for the all-German team at the Olympic Games in Tokyo, making the semi-final.
- 1965: May broke four records in only a few weeks:

European record in the 1500 m: 3:36.4 min. on 14 July in Erfurt
World record in the 1000 m: 2:16.2 min. on 20 July in Erfurt
GDR record in the 800 m: 1:46.3 min. on 25 August in Potsdam
GDR record in the one mile run: 3:56.0 min. on 30 August in London

- 1965: May was nominated as GDR sportsman of the year (GDR statistics show that he came runner-up to Peter Ducke)

== Lifelong ban in the GDR ==
During the 1966 European Athletics Championships in Budapest, May, on behalf of a footwear company, bribed teammate Jürgen Haase to wear the company's trainers in the 10,000 metres final. A rival firm in West Germany found out about the incident and made the details public. As punishment, May was given a lifelong ban from participating on behalf of the GDR. He also lost his job as an unpaid employee at the Erfurt newspaper Das Volk, and therefore had to work from then on as a sports teacher.

== New start in the FRG ==
In 1967 May took advantage of an offer to move to West Germany, where he was able to continue his career as a sportsman. He was selected by the German Athletics Federation for the 1969 European Championships. However, the team boycotted the European Championships and participated only symbolically in the relay competitions.

May did not succeed in obtaining a foothold in international competitions again. In 1970 in Stockholm he pulled out of the European Cup final at short notice due to a tooth operation. He pulled out of the 1971 European Championships in Helsinki in advance. His last international competition was the 1972 Olympic Games in Munich where he failed to qualify for the final in the 5000 metres. Afterwards he retired from competitive sport. He later worked as a civil servant in Main-Kinzig-Kreis.

May is 1.74 m tall and had a match weight of 68 kg.

Records
Preceded by (France) Michel Jazy	European Record Holder Men's 1500 m 14 July 1965 - 24 June 1966	Succeeded by (France) Michel Jazy
Awards
Preceded by (East Germany) Klaus Urbanczyk	East German Sportsman of the Year; 1965	Succeeded by (East Germany) Frank Wiegand
