= Gunnar Ekman =

Swedish middle-distance runner

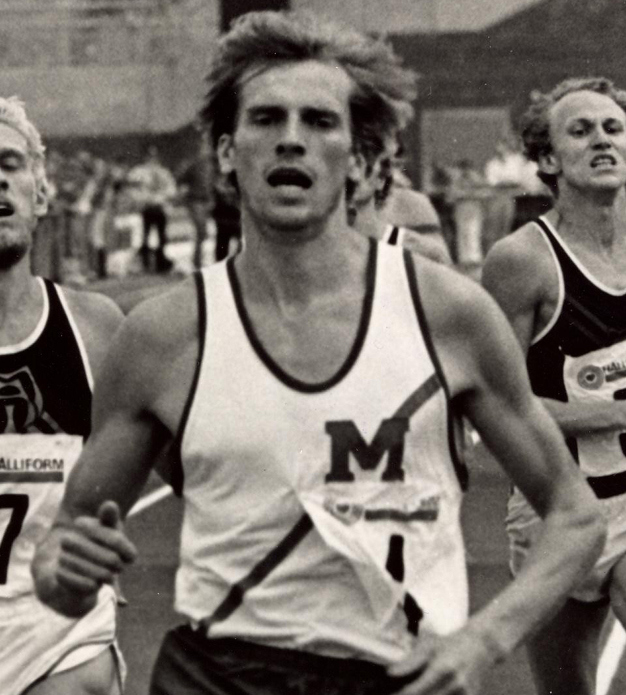

Personal information
- Nationality: Swedish
- Born: 18 June 1943 (age 83) Bromma, Sweden
- Height: 191 cm (6 ft 3 in)
- Weight: 75 kg (165 lb)

Sport
- Sport: Middle-distance running
- Event: 1500 m
- Club: Mälarhöjdens IK

Achievements and titles
- Personal best: 3:39.44 (1972)

Nils Gunnar Ekman (born 18 June 1943) is a Swedish middle-distance runner. He reached semifinals of the 1500 m event at the 1972 Summer Olympics.
