= André Dehertoghe =

Belgian middle-distance runner

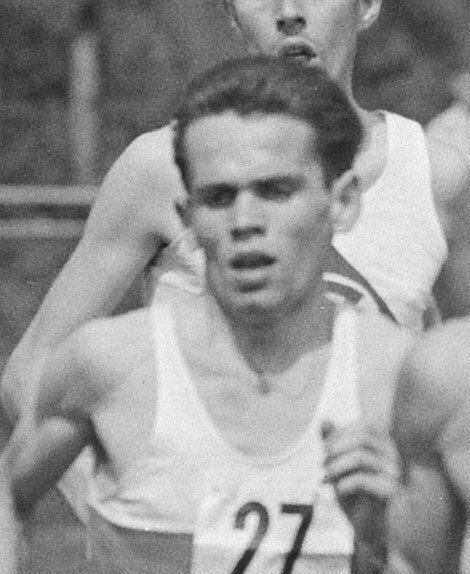
André Dehertoghe in 1964

André Dehertoghe (19 June 1941 in Leuven – 25 August 2016) was a Belgian runner who competed in the 1968 and 1972 Summer Olympics. He finished fifth in the 1500 metres at the 1969 European Championships.
