= Jean-Pierre Dufresne =

French middle-distance runner

Personal information
- Nationality: French
- Born: 16 June 1945 (age 81)

Sport
- Sport: Middle-distance running
- Event: 800 metres

Jean-Pierre Dufresne (born 16 June 1945) is a French middle-distance runner. He competed in the men's 800 metres at the 1968 Summer Olympics.
