= John Kirkbride (musician) =

Scottish musician (born 1946)

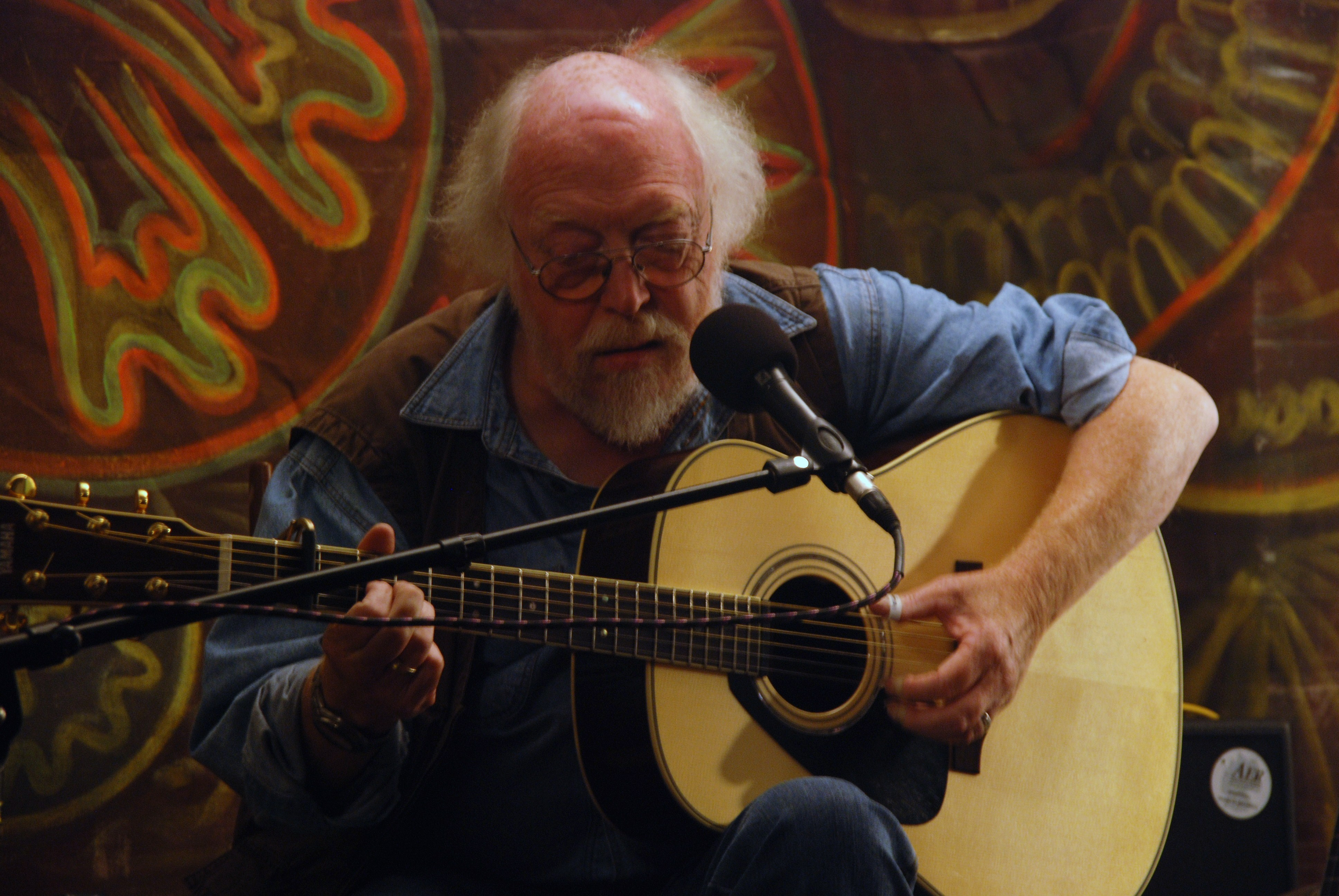
- John Kirkbride in 2008

Background information
- Born: 17 February 1946 (age 80); Ullapool, Scotland
- Genres: Blues, folk
- Occupations: Singer-songwriter, musician
- Instruments: Vocals, guitar
- Years active: 1975–present
- Website: www.facebook.com/kirkbridemusic.2/.

John Kirkbride (born 17 February 1946, Ullapool, Scotland) is a Scottish singer, guitarist, songwriter and entertainer, currently residing in Germany.

== Style ==
Kirkbride's musical style is deeply rooted in the 1920s and 1930s, inspired by such musicians as Blind Blake, Blind Willie McTell and Robert Johnson. Later guitarists such as Doc Watson, Chet Atkins and Leon Redbone were also an influence. Slide and alternative tunings played a huge role in providing accompaniment to the many songs he has composed over the years, that is not including the jazz and blues standards played in his own style. His songs are not all recognisable as standard blues. Many of the songs, for example his song "Gas Tax Blues", are of a social and critical nature more reminiscent of Bob Dylan or Randy Newman. His voice that has been compared to a "thousand litres of whisky".

== History ==
John Kirkbride has been touring the world with his music since 1975 and has witnessed many changes in musical fashion, but has himself remained true to the older traditions of acoustic guitar and vocals.

He was invited to play at the 1984 Montreux Jazz Festival. Kirkbride has shared the stage with Joan Armatrading, John Mayall, Golden Earring and Whitesnake. He has performed as a duo with Pete Seeger, Arlo Guthrie, Alexis Korner, Lightning Hopkins, Bert Jansch, Chuck Leavell and Louisiana Red and a session with Hank Marvin in the mid-1970s.

== Today ==
As of 2015, Kirkbride was still touring, composing and recording. He is also teaching guitar to a new generation of young musicians who are increasingly fascinated by the guitar techniques of yesteryear, where a single guitar, picked fully, could sound like a one-man band.

== Discography ==
=== LPs ===
- Tracks
- Magnetic Mugshots of Memorable Moments
- Sourdough, Corn and Hot Biscuits
- Reds and Blues

=== CDs ===
- Blue Images
- Street Kids
- Brotherhood in Blues (with Ferdl Eichner)
- Adam und Eva (with Hans-Christian Kirsch)
- Der Keltische Zauberspiegel (with Hans-Christian Kirsch)
- Riches to Rags (with Ferdl Eichner)
- Changing of the Ways (from Bluesballaden from Hans-Christian Kirsch)
- Return Cargo (with Albie Donnelly)
- Sketches Out of the Box
- Lifeline (with Ferdl Eichner) 2009
- The Gambler (with Andreas Schirneck) 2013
