= Peter Stewart (athlete) =

British middle-distance runner (born 1947)

Personal information
- Nationality: British (Scottish)
- Born: 8 August 1947 (age 78)

Sport
- Sport: Athletics
- Event: middle-distance
- Club: Birchfield Harriers
Medal record
Representing Great Britain
European Indoor Championships
Gold medal – first place	1971 Sofia	3000 m

Peter John Stewart (born 8 August 1947) is a British male former middle-distance runner. His greatest achievement was a gold medal in the 3000 metres at the European Athletics Indoor Championships in 1971.

== Biography ==
Stewart competed for Scotland at the 1970 British Commonwealth Games, narrowly missing out on a medal in fourth place. He was Scottish champion in the 1500 m in 1970.

Stewart finished second behind Tony Polhill in the 1500 metres event at the 1971 AAA Championships but by virtue of being the highest placed British athlete was considered the British 1500 metres champion One month later he competed in the 1500 metres at the 1971 European Athletics Championships, but failed to make the final.

He was the 3000 m champion at the 1971 AAA Indoor Championships and won the 1500 m AAA title outright at the 1972 AAA Championships.

Both he and his brother Ian Stewart were members of Birchfield Harriers. At the Emsley Carr Mile, he took back-to-back titles in 1971 and 1972, following on from his brother's victory the previous year. Their younger sister Mary won gold in the 1500m representing England at the 1978 Commonwealth Games.

== International competitions ==
Year	Competition	Venue	Position	Event	Notes
1970	British Commonwealth Games	Edinburgh, United Kingdom	4th	1500 m	3.40.64
1971	European Indoor Championships	Sofia, Bulgaria	1st	3000 m	7:53.6
1971	European Championships	Helsinki, Finland	7th (heats)	1500 m	3:45.0

== National titles ==
- AAA Championships
  - 1500 m: 1972
- AAA Indoor Championships
  - 3000 m: 1971

== See also ==
- List of European Athletics Indoor Championships medalists (men)
