= Spilios Zakharopoulos =

Greek middle-distance runner

Personal information
- Nationality: Greek
- Born: 2 February 1950 (age 76) Sidirokastro, Messenia

Sport
- Sport: Middle-distance running
- Event: 1500 metres
Medal record
Men's athletics
Representing Greece
European Indoor Championships
| Silver medal – second place | 1972 Grenoble | 1500 m |

Spilios Zakharopoulos (born 2 February 1950) is a Greek middle-distance runner. He competed in the 1500 metres at the 1972 Summer Olympics and the 1976 Summer Olympics.
