= Tom Hansen (athlete) =

Danish middle-distance runner

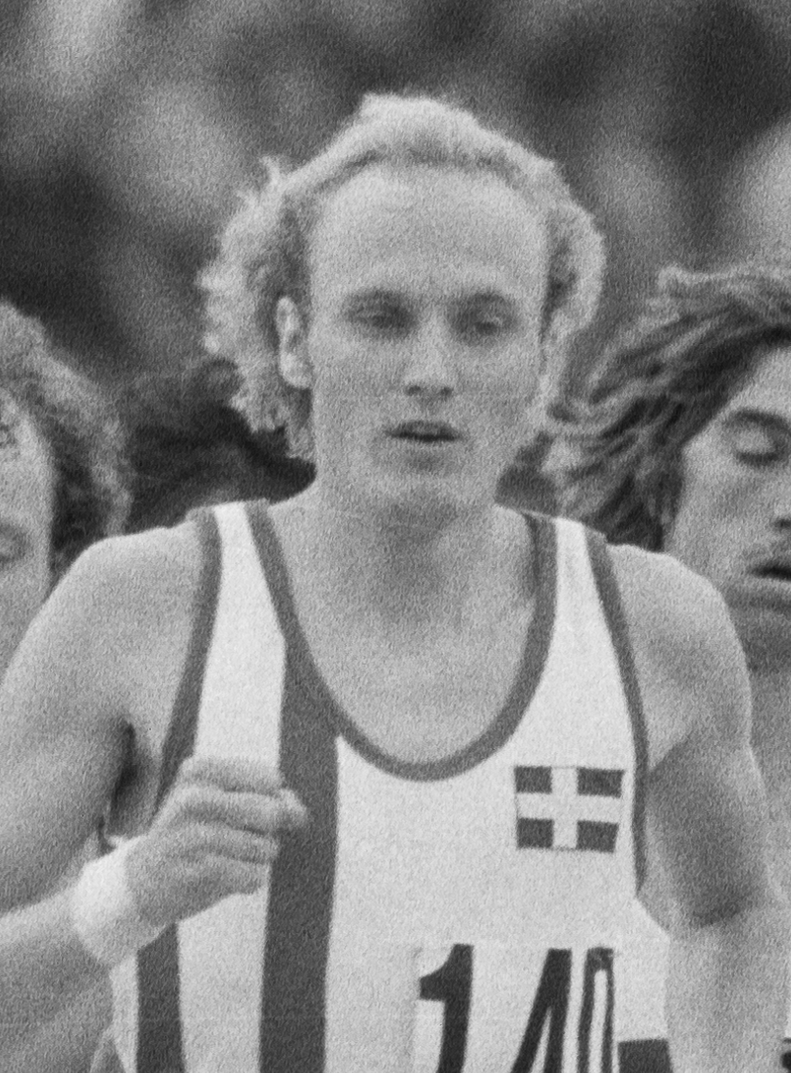
- Tom Hansen (1974)

Personal information
- Nationality: Danish
- Born: 25 February 1948 (age 78)

Sport
- Sport: Middle-distance running
- Event: 1500 metres
Medal record
Men's athletics
Representing Denmark
European Championships
Silver medal – second place	1974 Rome	1500 m

Tom Hansen (born 25 February 1948) is a Danish middle-distance runner. He competed in the 1500 metres at the 1968 Summer Olympics and the 1972 Summer Olympics. He was an 11-time national champion and silver medalist at the European Championships.
