= Herman Mignon =

Belgian middle-distance runner

Personal information
- Nationality: Belgian
- Born: 21 March 1951 (age 75)

Sport
- Sport: Middle-distance running
- Event: 800 metres
Medal record
Representing Belgium
European Indoor Championships
Silver medal – second place	1973 Rotterdam	1500 m

Herman Mignon (born 21 March 1951) is a Belgian middle-distance runner. He competed in the men's 800 (finishing 6th) and 1500 metres at the 1972 Summer Olympics and in the men's 1500 metres at the 1976 Summer Olympics.
