= Alan Simpson (runner) =

British middle-distance runner (1940–2024)

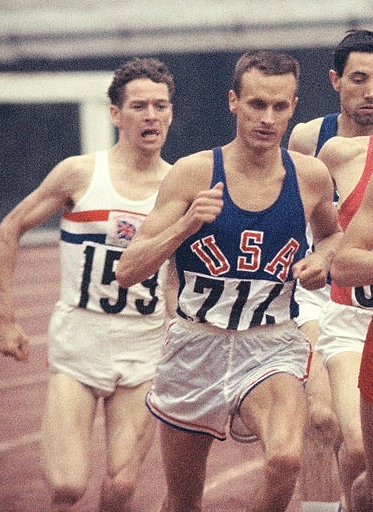
- Simpson (left) at the 1964 Olympics

Personal information
- Born: 22 May 1940 Coventry, England
- Died: 24 October 2024 (aged 84)
- Height: 1.78 m (5 ft 10 in)
- Weight: 64 kg (141 lb)

Sport
- Sport: Athletics
- Event: 1500 m
- Club: Rotherham Harriers & AC

Achievements and titles
- Personal best: 1500 m – 3:38.4 (1965)
Medal record
Representing England
Commonwealth Games
| Silver medal – second place | 1966 Kingston | 1 mile |

Alan Simpson (22 May 1940 – 24 October 2024) was a British middle distance runner who competed at the 1964 Summer Olympics.

== Biography ==
Simpson represented England in the mile at the British Empire and Commonwealth Games but did not make the final at the 1962 British Empire and Commonwealth Games in Perth, Australia.

Simpson became the British 1 mile champion after winning the British AAA Championships title at the 1963 AAA Championships and the 1964 AAA Championships. Later that year at the 1964 Olympic Games in Tokyo, he represented Great Britain in the 1500 metres.

Simpson won a third AAA title at the 1965 AAA Championships and finished second in 1966. Shortly afterwards he represented England at the 1966 British Empire and Commonwealth Games in Kingston, Jamaica and won a silver medal.

Simpson died on 24 October 2024, at the age of 84.
