= Volodymyr Panteley =

Ukrainian athlete

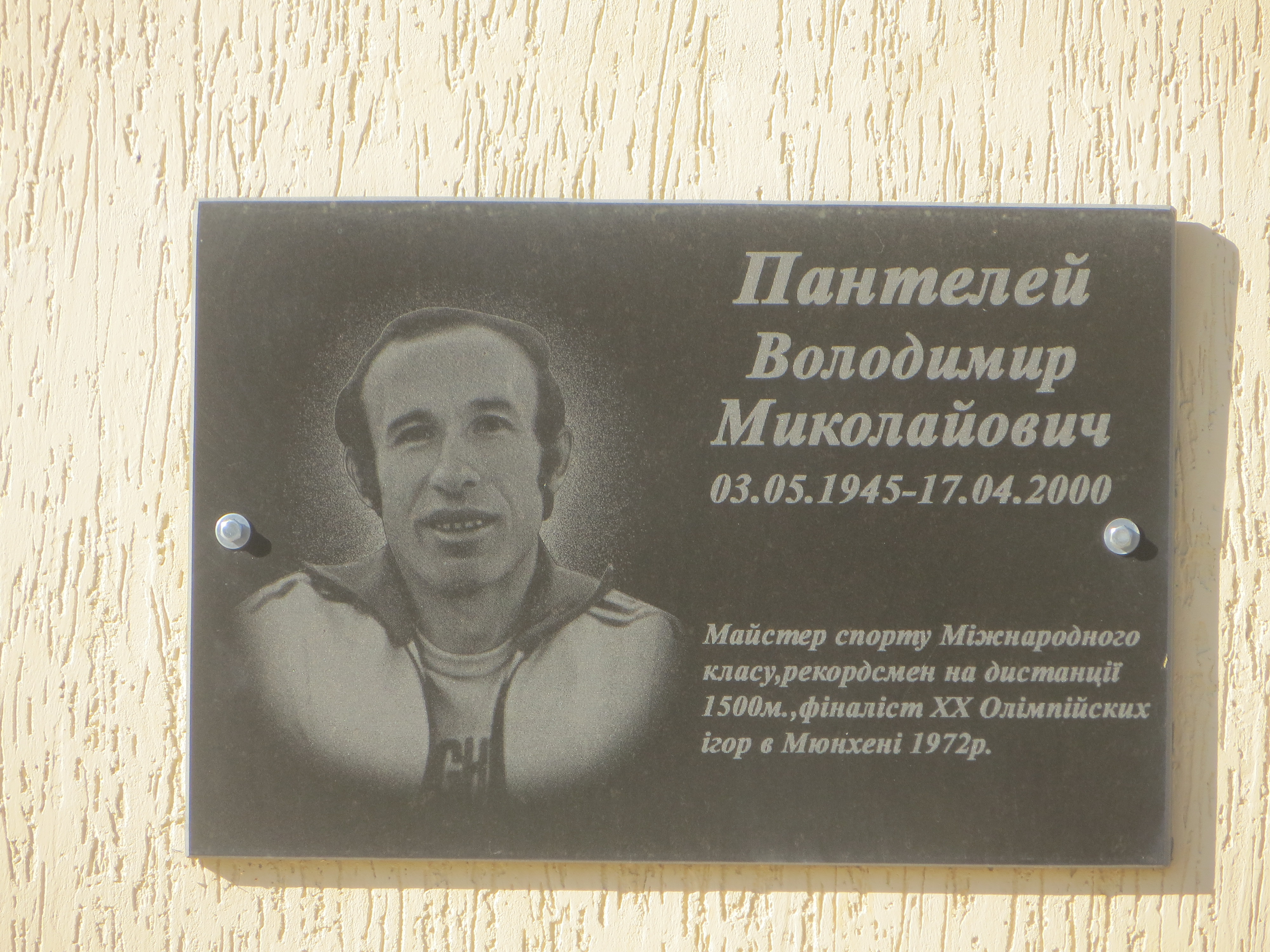
- Memorial plaque for Panteley

Personal information
- Nationality: Ukrainian
- Born: 3 May 1945 Zolochiv, Kharkiv Oblast, Ukrainian SSR, Soviet Union
- Died: 17 April 2000 (aged 54) Kharkiv, Ukraine

Sport
- Sport: Middle-distance running
- Event: 1500 metres
Medal record
Men's athletics
Representing Soviet Union
European Indoor Championships
Silver medal – second place	1971 Sofia	1500 m
Bronze medal – third place	1970 Vienna	1500 m

Volodymyr Panteley (Ukrainian: Володимир Пантелей; 3 May 1945 – 17 April 2000) was a Ukrainian middle-distance runner. He competed in the men's 1500 metres at the 1972 Summer Olympics, representing the Soviet Union.
