= John Kirkbride (athlete) =

British middle-distance runner

Personal information
- Nationality: British (English)
- Born: 24 March 1947 (age 79) Whitehaven, England
- Height: 174 cm (5 ft 9 in)
- Weight: 62 kg (137 lb)

Sport
- Sport: Athletics
- Event: Middle-distance running
- Club: Blackpool & Fylde AC
Medal record
Representing Great Britain
Summer Universiade
Silver medal – second place	1970 Turin	1500m

John Christopher Kirkbride (born 24 March 1947) is a British retired international middle-distance runner who competed at the 1972 Summer Olympics.

== Biography ==
Kirkbride finished second behind Walter Wilkinson in the 1500 metres event at the 1970 AAA Championships. Shortly afterwards Kirkbride represented England in the 1500 metres, at the 1970 British Commonwealth Games in Edinburgh, Scotland.

He finished third behind Peter Stewart in the 1500m event at the 1972 AAA Championships before competing in the men's 1500 metres event for Great Britain at the 1972 Olympics Games in Munich.

Two years later he competed once again in the 1500 metres at the 1974 British Commonwealth Games in Christchurch, New Zealand.
