= Knut Brustad =

Norwegian middle-distance runner

Knut Brustad (born 23 July 1945) is a former Norwegian middle distance runner who specialized in the 800 and 1500 metres. He represented Frosta IL (in Frosta) and IL i BUL (in Oslo) during his active career.

He won the silver medal at the 1969 European Indoor Games and finished eighth at the 1970 European Indoor Championships. In addition he competed at the 1969 European Championships without reaching the final. He became Norwegian champion in 800 m in the years 1967-1969.

His personal best times were 1:48.7 minutes over 800 metres and 3:43.1 minutes over 1500 metres.
