= Gilbert Van Manshoven =

Belgian middle-distance runner

Personal information
- Nationality: Belgian
- Born: 26 May 1946 Rijkel, Belgium
- Died: 10 March 2019 (aged 72) Tongeren, Belgium

Sport
- Sport: Middle-distance running
- Event: 800 metres

Gilbert Van Manshoven (26 May 1946 – 10 March 2019) was a Belgian middle-distance runner. He competed in the men's 800 metres at the 1968 Summer Olympics.
