= Bodo Tümmler =

German middle-distance runner

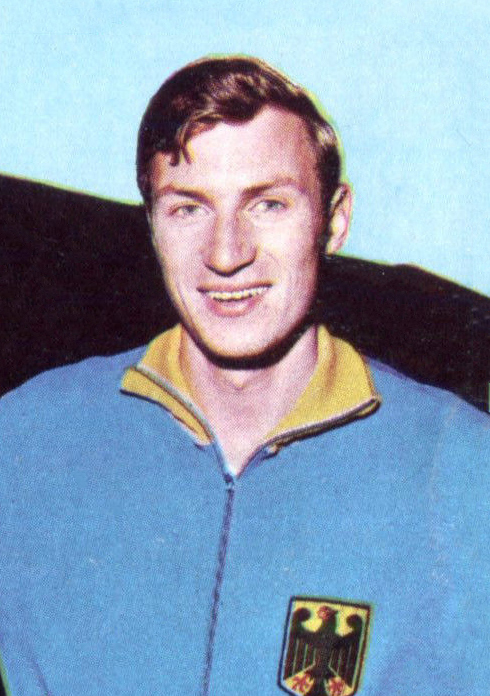

Personal information
- Born: 8 December 1943 (age 82) Toruń, German-occupied Poland
- Height: 1.88 m (6 ft 2 in)
- Weight: 72 kg (159 lb)

Sport
- Sport: Athletics
- Event: 1500 m
- Club: SC Charlottenburg, Berlin

Achievements and titles
- Personal best: 3:36.5 (1968)
Medal record
Men's athletics
Representing West Germany
Olympic Games
Bronze medal – third place	1968 Mexico City	1500 m
European Championships
Gold medal – first place	1966 Budapest	1500 m
Bronze medal – third place	1966 Budapest	800 m
Summer Universiade
Gold medal – first place	1965 Budapest	1500m
Gold medal – first place	1967 Tokyo	1500m
Bronze medal – third place	1967 Tokyo	800m

Bodo Tümmler (born 8 December 1943) is a German former middle-distance runner. He competed for West Germany at the 1968 and 1972 Olympics in the 1500 meter event, and won a bronze medal in 1968.

== Biography ==
Tümmler was born in Toruń (Thorn), part of Poland under German occupation in years 1939–1945, now Toruń, Poland. He entered the 1968 Olympics as the reigning European Champion. The 1500 m final was run at a fast pace and at the start of the last lap the eventual Olympic Champion Kipchoge Keino had already established a substantial lead. Tümmler and his countryman Harald Norpoth were in second and third place but were outsprinted by the world-record holder Jim Ryun on the last lap.
