= Jacky Boxberger =

French track and field athlete (1949–2001)

Medal record

Men's athletics

Representing France

European Indoor Championships
Gold medal – first place	1972 Grenoble	1500 m

Jacques "Jacky" Boxberger (16 April 1949 – 9 August 2001) was a track and field athlete from France who specialized in long-distance races.

He was the great hope of French middle-distance running, breaking the junior world record in the 1500 metres at Stade Charléty in 1968. He represented France at the 1968, 1972, 1976 and 1984 Summer Olympics, placing sixth in the 1968 1500 metres and 42nd in the 1984 marathon. He also won the Paris Marathon in 1983 and 1985, the 1500 metres title at the 1972 European Athletics Indoor Championships, the Marrakech Marathon in 1987, and French titles in the 1500 metres, 5000 metres, and 10000 metres. He suffered a knee injury during his military service with the Joinville battalion. His career was the most brilliant among male French distance runners of his era behind only that of former world mile record-holder Michel Jazy.

Boxberger was part of the French team that finished third at the World Cross Country Championships in 1976.

In 2001, Boxberger was on vacation with his family in Kenya. While he was trying to film an elephant on a safari, the animal picked him up with its trunk, threw him against a tree, and trampled him to death.

The middle distance runner Ophélie Claude-Boxberger is his daughter.
