= Jaiye Abidoye =

Nigerian middle-distance runner

Personal information
- Nationality: Nigerian
- Born: 11 May 1942 (age 84)

Sport
- Sport: Middle-distance running
- Event: 800 metres

Jaiye Abidoye (born 11 May 1942) is a Nigerian middle-distance runner. He competed in the men's 800 metres at the 1972 Summer Olympics.
