= Bill Smart =

Canadian middle-distance runner

Personal information
- Born: June 5, 1948 (age 78) Vancouver, British Columbia
Medal record
Men's Athletics
Representing Canada
Pan American Games
Silver medal – second place	1971 Cali	1500 metres
Commonwealth Games
Bronze medal – third place	1970 Edinburgh	800 metres

William Smart (born June 5, 1948, in Vancouver, British Columbia) is a retired male middle distance runner from Canada, who represented his native country at the 1972 Summer Olympics in Munich, West Germany. He claimed the silver medal in the men's 1500 metres event at the 1971 Pan American Games in Cali, Colombia and the bronze in the 800 metres at the 1970 British Commonwealth Games in Edinburgh.

Smart was an All-American runner for the Washington Huskies track and field team, finishing 5th in the mile run at the 1970 NCAA University Division Outdoor Track and Field Championships.
