= Haico Scharn =

Dutch middle-distance runner (1945–2021)

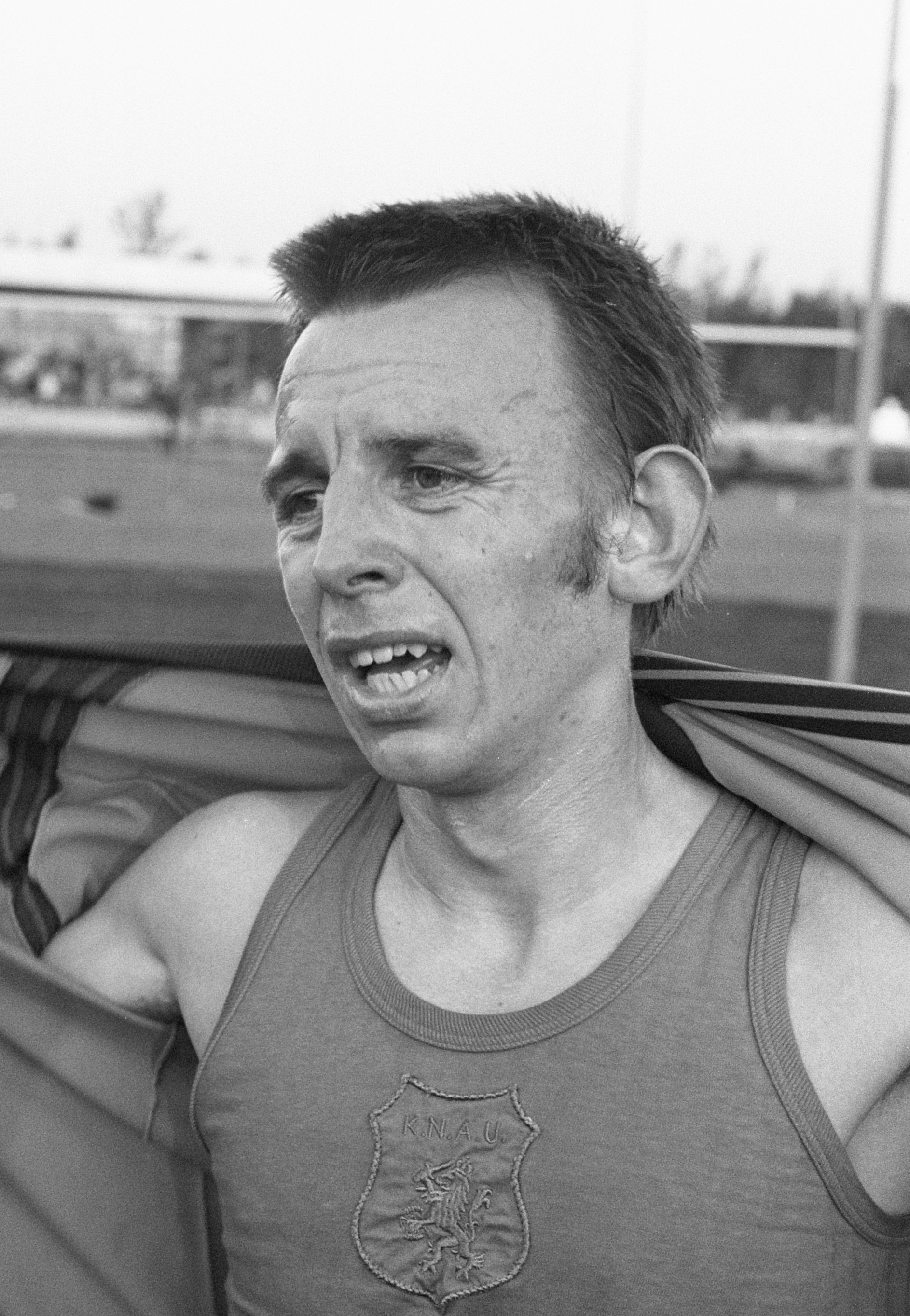
- Scharn in 1972

Personal information
- Nationality: Dutch
- Born: Helprich Haico Stephanus Adrianus Scharn; 18 June 1945 Gemert, Netherlands
- Died: 10 June 2021 (aged 75) Culemborg
- Height: 1.87 m (6 ft 2 in)
- Weight: 70 kg (150 lb)

Sport
- Sport: Middle-distance running
- Club: CIKO '66, Arnhem

Helprich Haico Stephanus Adrianus Scharn (18 June 1945 – 10 June 2021) was a Dutch middle-distance runner. He competed at Helsinki's 1971 European Athletics Championships in the 1500 m, in which he reached the eighth place in the final. He competed at the 1972 Summer Olympics, again in the 1500 m, advancing to the semi-finals. He finished in fourth place in this event at the 1974 European Athletics Championships in Rome.

After retiring from running he worked as athletics coach, training such competitors as Els Vader, Letitia Vriesde, Stella Jongmans, Yvonne van der Kolk and Leon Haan.

Awards
Preceded by Jos Hermens	Herman van Leeuwen Cup; 1973	Succeeded by Jos Hermens
