= Brendan Foster =

British long-distance runner

Sir Brendan Foster CBE
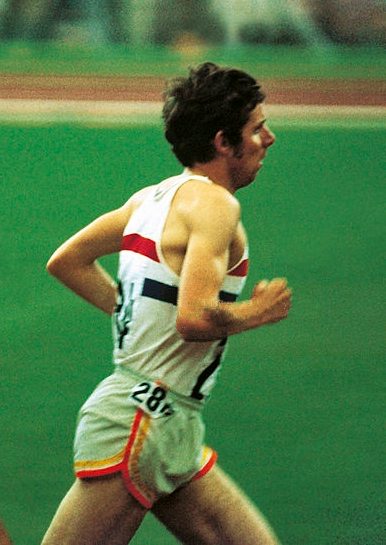
- Foster at the 1972 Olympics

Personal information
- Nickname: Big Bren
- Born: 12 January 1948 (age 78) Hebburn, County Durham, England
- Height: 5 ft 10 in (178 cm)
- Weight: 10 st 10 lb (150 lb; 68 kg)
- Relative: James Scully GC (uncle)

Sport
- Sport: Athletics
- Events: 1500 m, 5,000 m, 10,000 m
- Club: Gateshead Harriers

Achievements and titles
- Personal bests: 1500 m – 3:37.64 (1974); 5,000 m – 13:14.60 (1974); 10,000 m – 27:30.30 (1978)
Medal record
Men's athletics
Representing Great Britain
Olympic Games
Bronze medal – third place	1976 Montréal	10,000 m
European Championships
Gold medal – first place	1974 Rome	5,000 m
Bronze medal – third place	1971 Helsinki	1500 m
Representing England
Commonwealth Games
Gold medal – first place	1978 Edmonton	10,000 m
Silver medal – second place	1974 Christchurch	5,000 m
Bronze medal – third place	1970 Edinburgh	1500 m

Sir Brendan Foster CBE (born 12 January 1948) is a British former long-distance runner, athletics commentator and road race organiser. He founded the Great North Run, one of the sport's most high profile half-marathon races. As an athlete, he won the bronze medal in the 10,000 metres at the 1976 Summer Olympics and the gold medal in the 5,000 metres at the 1974 European Championships and the 10,000 metres at the 1978 Commonwealth Games. He later provided commentary and analysis on athletics, particularly long-distance events, for BBC Sport.

== Early life ==
Educated at St Joseph's RC Grammar School in Hebburn, the University of Sussex and Carnegie College of Physical Education, Foster returned to St Joseph's Grammar School as a chemistry teacher. His pupils included footballer turned manager Phil Brown, whom he tried to encourage to take up running over football.

== Athletics career ==
Brendan Foster's athletic career saw him compete in three Olympic Games, claiming Britain's only track and field medal (bronze in the 10,000 metres) at the 1976 Montreal Olympics. In 1973 he broke the World Record for two miles at Crystal Palace with a time of 8:13.68. In 1974 he won a silver medal in the Commonwealth Games in Christchurch in a time of 13:14.60 behind Ben Jipcho before winning the European Championships 5,000m, beating Olympic champion Lasse Virén en route to Gold in 13:17.20. When the then world record was within reach, he ran the final lap in a relatively leisurely 62 seconds after establishing a commanding lead before it. In the same year he broke the 3,000m World Record on his home track, Gateshead International Stadium with a time of 7:35.10. That year, Foster was awarded the BBC's prestigious Sports Personality of the Year award.

He established his personal best in the 10,000 m with a time of 27:30.30 run at Crystal Palace on 23 June 1978, while also winning 10,000 m gold at the 1978 Commonwealth Games in Edmonton.

Foster only placed fourth in the 1978 European Athletics Championships 10,000-metre race, but he ran faster than any 10,000-metre European Champion has run ever since (see various European countries' books about the European Athletics Championships from 1982 to 2006). Foster finished fifth in the 1976 Olympics 5,000-metre final, just 1.4 seconds behind the winner, Lasse Viren of Finland. Foster lost all his three Olympic races against Viren – 5,000 and 10,000 m in 1976 and 10,000 m in 1980. In the preliminaries to the 1976 5,000 m race he broke Viren's Olympic record running 13:20.34. That record would hold through the final until it was surpassed in the final of the 1984 Olympics.

Foster's final major race was the 1980 Olympics 10,000-metre final, where he finished eleventh, almost 40 seconds behind the winner, Ethiopia's Miruts Yifter.

Foster was the three-time British 5,000 metres champion (1973, 1974, 1976) and twice British 10,000 metres champion (1977 and 1978). The five titles were achieved at the AAA Championships.

In 2010, he was inducted into the England Athletics Hall of Fame.

== Business, media and other activities ==
Brendan joined the sports company Nike in 1981 as UK managing director. Progressing to European managing director, Vice-President Marketing (Worldwide) and Vice-President of Nike Europe. In 1988 he set up a company, Nova International with three friends from Nike. This company was later renamed to View From International, which won a contract to supply the British athletics team. The brand was later sold to Marks and Spencer in 2002 for an estimated £2m.

After retiring following the Moscow Olympics in 1980, Foster worked for BBC Sport, commentating and reporting on athletics at major events from 1983 to 2017.

In 1977, he helped organise the "Gateshead Fun Run", a pioneering running event. In 1981, Foster founded the Great North Run, an annual half marathon from Newcastle upon Tyne to South Shields. The race became the biggest running event in the UK, and one of the biggest half marathons in the world. By 2014, the race had been run by over 1 million competitors, the first IAAF event to pass this milestone. Foster ran in the 2003 event for the first time in many years, after being challenged to do so by radio presenter Ray Stubbs.

Foster has also promoted sport in Ethiopia and other African countries.

== Recognition and honours ==
Foster was Chancellor of Leeds Metropolitan University from 2005 to 2009. Foster was appointed a Member of the Order of the British Empire (MBE) in the 1976 New Year Honours for services to athletics, and promoted to Commander of the same Order (CBE) in the 2008 New Year Honours for services to sport. In December 2016 Foster was given the Freedom of the City of Newcastle, the city's highest honour. In August 2017, in recognition to his major contributions to the advancements of athletics, at a ceremony in London, Foster was awarded the IAAF highest award, the Golden Order of Merit. Foster was knighted in the 2020 Birthday Honours for ‘services to international and national sport and to culture in North East England’.

Records
Preceded by (Belgium) Emiel Puttemans	Men's 3,000m World Record Holder; 3 August 1974 – 27 June 1978	Succeeded by (Kenya) Henry Rono
Awards
Preceded by (Scotland) Jackie Stewart	BBC Sports Personality of the Year; 1974	Succeeded by (England) David Steele
Sporting positions
Preceded by (Belgium) Emiel Puttemans	Men's 3.000m Best Year Performance; 1973–74	Succeeded by (New Zealand) Rod Dixon
