= Pekka Vasala =

Finnish middle and long-distance runner

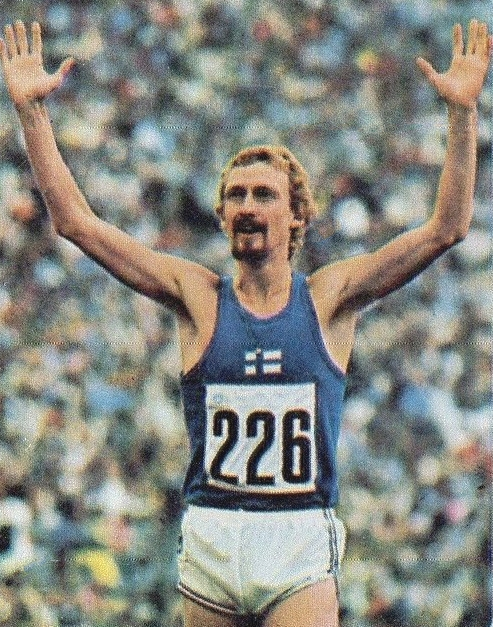
- Pekka Vasala in 1972

Personal information
- Born: 17 April 1948 (age 78) Riihimäki, Finland
- Height: 1.84 m (6 ft 0 in)
- Weight: 63–65 kg (139–143 lb)

Sport
- Sport: Athletics
- Events: 1500 m, 800 m
- University team: BYU Cougars
- Club: Riihimäen Kisko; Mäntsälän Urheilijat

Achievements and titles
- Personal best: 1500 – 3:36.33 (1972) 800 – 1:44,5 (1972)
Medal record
Representing Finland
Olympic Games
Gold medal – first place	1972 Munich	1500 m

Pekka Antero Vasala (born 17 April 1948) is a retired Finnish middle-distance athlete who won an Olympic gold medal in the 1972 Summer Olympics in Munich. Vasala had a brilliant three-month period in 1972 when he won an Olympic gold medal at 1,500 meters and set a new European record in the 800 meters running 1:44.5. The time was only 0.2 seconds off the world record. His Olympic gold would be his only major international medal. He retired in 1974.

Vasala was not considered a medal contender in the 1,500 m at the beginning of the season. He surprisingly won gold over Kip Keino in 3:36.3, a time which topped the world rankings that year.

Vasala had competed at the 1968 Olympics, where he was eliminated in his first-round heat of the 1,500 m. He was a 3:41.8 runner that season. He improved to 3:41.0 in 1970 and 3:38.6 in 1971. At both the 1969 and 1971 European Championships, Vasala reached the 1,500 m finals but finished ninth on both occasions.

In July 1972 Vasala ran 3:36.8 for 1,500 metres which was the fastest time in the world that year. Three weeks before the Olympics, he ran 1:44.5 for 800 metres, a European record.

In September, his winning time of 3:36.3 in the Olympic final placed him sixth on the all-time list. His last 400 metres was 53.5, his last 800 1:49.0, and his last 1,000 metres of 2:19.1, the latter only beaten up to that time by Jim Ryun in his world record run. After the games, he defeated Dave Wottle, the Olympic 800 champion and world record holder in 1:44.6.

Vasala did not run internationally in 1973. His last international competition came at the 1974 European Championships, where he placed sixth in the 1,500 m. He won six Finnish titles – the 800 m in 1970-72 and the 1,500 m in 1969–71.

His countryman Lasse Virén had won the 5,000 m earlier in the day, in addition to winning the 10,000 m in world record time earlier in the games. With a medal in every track event from 1500 to 10,000 meters, three gold and one bronze (Tapio Kantanen in the 3000 meter steeplechase) Finnish athletes achieved a level of success not seen since the era of the "Flying Finns" (1912–1936).

His nephew, Samuli Vasala, also an athlete, won the 2003 Nordic Cross Country Championships. Vasala is the son-in-law of Martti Matilainen.

Records
Preceded by (West Germany) Walter Adams	European Record Holder Men's 800m 20 August 1972 – 26 June 1973	Succeeded by (Italy) Marcello Fiasconaro
