= Walter Wilkinson (runner) =

British athlete (born 1944)

Personal information
- Nationality: British (English)
- Born: 2 November 1944 (age 81) Knaresborough, England
- Died: middle-distance

Sport
- Sport: Athletics
- Club: Rowntrees AC; Longwood Harriers

Walter Wilkinson (born 2 November 1944) is a male former athlete who competed for England.

== Biography ==
Wilkinson was selected by England to represent his country in athletics events. He finished third behind Alan Simpson in the 1 mile event at the 1965 AAA Championships and improved to second place at the 1966 AAA Championships behind American John Camien but by virtue of being the highest placed British athlete was considered the British 1 mile champion.

He represented England in the 1 mile race, at the 1966 British Empire and Commonwealth Games in Kingston, Jamaica.

Wilkinson was on the podium again at the AAA Championsships in 1968 and won a bronze medal in the 1,500 metres at the 1969 European Indoor Championships in Belgrade in 1969.

Wilkinson won his final AAA title at the 1970 AAA Championships.
