= Edgar Salvé =

Belgian middle-distance runner (1946–2026)

Edgar Salvé (1 August 1946 – 15 January 2026) was a Belgian middle-distance runner who specialised in the 1500 metres run.

== Biography ==
Salvé was born in Bensberg, Germany, but represented the sports club RFC Liège, in Liège Province. His greatest achievement was winning the 1969 European Indoor Games. He finished fifth at the 1967 European Indoor Games, fourth at the 1969 European Championships, and seventh at the 1970 European Indoor Championships. He also competed at the 1968 and 1972 Olympic Games without reaching the final.

His personal best time for the 1500 metre run was 3:39.91 minutes (1969). He ran 3000 metres at the 1975 European Indoor Championships, where he finished seventh.

Salvé died on 15 January 2026, at the age of 79.
