= Ulf Högberg =

Swedish middle-distance runner (1946–2023)

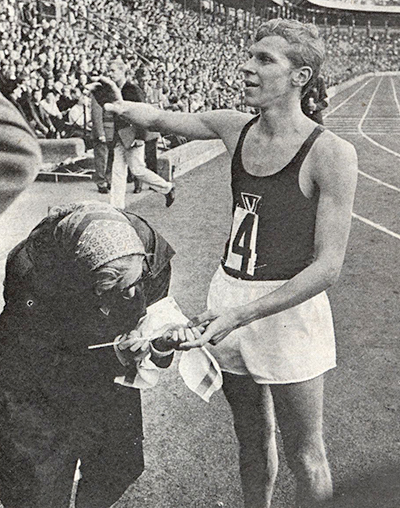
- Hogberg in 1967

Personal information
- Nationality: Swedish
- Born: 21 January 1946 Gothenburg, Sweden
- Died: 16 May 2023 (aged 77) Täby, Sweden

Sport
- Sport: Middle-distance running
- Event: 1500 metres

Ulf Högberg (21 January 1946 – 16 May 2023) was a Swedish middle-distance runner. He competed in the 1500 metres at the 1972 Summer Olympics and the 1976 Summer Olympics.

Högberg died in Täby on 16 May 2023, at the age of 77.
