= Jerzy Maluśki =

Polish middle-distance runner

Jerzy Piotr Maluśki (born 28 January 1946) is a retired Polish runner who specialized in the 1500 metres.

He was born in Błotnica, and represented the club Orkan Poznań. At the 1968 Summer Olympics he competed in round one of the 1500 metres. He finished sixth at the 1970 European Indoor Championships.

He became Polish champion in 1969. His personal best time was 3:40.7 minutes, achieved in 1969.
