= Mehmet Tümkan =

Turkish athlete

Personal information
- Nationality: Turkish
- Born: 2 October 1943 (age 82)

Sport
- Sport: Middle-distance running
- Event: 800 metres

Mehmet Tümkan (born 2 October 1943) is a Turkish middle-distance runner. He competed in the men's 800 metres at the 1972 Summer Olympics.
