= Gianni Del Buono =

Italian middle-distance runner

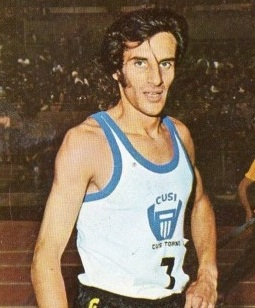
- Gianni Del Buono in 1972

Personal information
- Full name: Giovanni Del Buono
- Nationality: Italian
- Born: 1 October 1943 (age 82) Ancona, Italy
- Height: 1.80 m (5 ft 11 in)
- Weight: 65 kg (143 lb)

Sport
- Country: Italy
- Sport: Athletics
- Event: Middle distance running
- Club: CUS Roma

Achievements and titles
- Personal bests: 800 m: 1:48.0 (1968); 1500 m: 3:39.3 (1970); Mile: 4:00.3 (1970); 5000 m: 13:22.4 (1972)
Medal record
Men's athletics
Representing Italy
European Indoor Championships
Bronze medal – third place	1971 Sofia	1500 m
Summer Universiade
Bronze medal – third place	1967 Tokyo	1500 m
Bronze medal – third place	1970 Turin	1500 m

Gianni Del Buono (1 October 1943) is a former Italian middle distance runner.

He is the husband of the Italian middle-distance runner Rossella Gramola and the father of the middle-distance runner Federica Del Buono.

== Biography ==
Gianni Del Buono won three medals, at senior level, at the International athletics competitions. He participated at two editions of the Summer Olympics (1968 and 1972), he has 31 caps in national team from 1963 to 1973.

== Olympic results ==
Year	Competition	Venue	Position	Event	Performance	Note
1968	Olympic Games	Mexico City	Heat	800 metres	1:50.23	
1968	Olympic Games	Mexico City	Heat	1500 metres	3:48.41	
1972	Olympic Games	(West Germany) Munich	Heat	1500 metres	3:42.00	

== National titles ==
Gianni Del Buono has won 7 times the individual national championship.

- 1 win in the 800 metres (1970)
- 2 wins in the 1500 metres (1969, 1973)
- 1 win in the cross country running (1971)
- 1 win in the 1500 metres indoor (1971)
- 2 wins in the 3000 metres indoor (1972, 1973)

== See also ==
- Italian all-time lists - 800 metres
- 800 metres winners of Italian Athletics Championships
