= Frank Murphy (runner) =

Irish middle-distance runner

Personal information
- Nationality: Irish
- Born: 21 May 1947 Drumcondra, Dublin, Ireland
- Died: 5 January 2017 (aged 69) Dublin, Ireland
- Height: 183 cm (6 ft 0 in)
- Weight: 70 kg (154 lb)

Sport
- Sport: Athletics
- Event: middle distance
- Club: Clonliffe Harriers, Dublin
Medal record
Men's athletics
Representing Ireland
European Championships
Silver medal – second place	1969 Athens	1500 m
European Indoor Championships
Silver medal – second place	1970 Vienna	1500 m

Francis Murphy (21 May 1947 – 5 January 2017) was an Irish athlete, who specialised in middle-distance running and competed at the 1968 Summer Olympics and 1972 Summer Olympics.

== Biography ==
Murphy was educated by the Christian Brothers at O'Connell Schools in Dublin. In 1963, he won the Irish schools 880 yards title and two years later in 1965 won the Irish schools senior over 880 yards and 1 mile. He won the first of his 13 Irish AAA titles in 1966 and represented Ireland at the 1968 Olympic Games in Mexico City.

Murphy won the British AAA Championships title in the 1500 metres event at the 1969 AAA Championships and during the year of 1969 also won the 1969 880 yards at the NCAA Division I Indoor Track and Field Championships in a time of 1:51.1, representing the Villanova Wildcats track and field team and earned a silver medal by finishing in second place in the 1500 metres event at the 1969 European Athletics Championships.

He was also a 1500 m runner-up to Henryk Szordykowski at the 1970 European Athletics Indoor Championships.

A second Olympic Games appearance arrived in 1972, when Murphy took part in both the 800 and 1500 metres events at the 1972 Olympics Games in Munich.

He died on 5 January 2017 at the age of 69.
