= Gerd Larsen (athlete) =

Danish middle-distance runner

Personal information
- Nationality: Danish
- Born: 8 September 1942 (age 83)

Sport
- Sport: Middle-distance running
- Event: 800 metres

Gerd Larsen (born 8 September 1942) is a Danish middle-distance runner. He competed in the men's 800 metres at the 1968 Summer Olympics.
