= Franco Arese =

Italian middle-distance runner

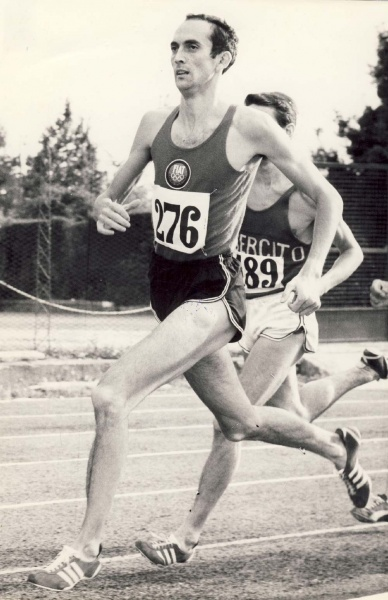

Personal information
- Full name: Francesco Arese
- Nationality: Italian
- Born: 13 April 1944 (age 82) Centallo, Italy
- Height: 1.83 m (6 ft 0 in)
- Weight: 70 kg (154 lb)

Sport
- Country: Italy
- Sport: Athletics
- Event: Middle distance running
- Club: Atalanta Balangero

Achievements and titles
- Personal bests: 800 m: 1:46.6 (1972); 1500 m: 3:36.3 (1971); Mile: 3:56.7 (1971); 5000 m: 13:40.0 (1971); 10000 m: 28:27.0 (1971)
Medal record
Men's athletics
Representing Italy
European Championships
| Gold medal – first place | 1971 Helsinki | 1500 m |
Mediterranean Games
| Silver medal – second place | 1971 Izmir | 1500m |
Summer Universiade
| Gold medal – first place | 1970 Turin | 1500m |

Francesco "Franco" Arese (born 13 April 1944 in Centallo) is an Italian middle-distance runner, competing mainly at 1500 m. Arese won the 1500 meters final at the 1971 European Athletics Championships in Helsinki, Finland.

He was the President of Italian Athletics Federation (FIDAL).

== Biography ==
Arese has won several Italian championships on 800, 1500 and 5000 meters. He competed in both the 1968 Summer Olympics in Mexico City and the 1972 Summer Olympics in Munich, but on both occasions failed to qualify for the final.

== National titles ==
He won 12 times the national championship.

- 4 wins in 800 metres at the Italian Athletics Championships (1968, 1969, 1972, 1973)
- 4 wins in 1500 metres at the Italian Athletics Championships (1986, 1967, 1968, 1970)
- 1 win in 5000 metres at the Italian Athletics Championships (1971)
- 1 win in Cross country running at the Italian Athletics Championships (1970)
- 1 win in 1500 metres at the Italian Athletics Indoor Championships (1972)
- 1 win in 3000 metres at the Italian Athletics Indoor Championships (1970)

== See also ==
- FIDAL Hall of Fame
