= Mikhail Zhelobovskiy =

Belarusian long-distance runner

Personal information
- Born: 8 May 1946 (age 80) Hrodna, Soviet Union

Sport
- Sport: Track and field
Medal record
Representing Soviet Union
Summer Universiade
Gold medal – first place	1973 Moscow	5000m
European Indoor Championships
Gold medal – first place	1968 Moscow	3x1000m relay
Bronze medal – third place	1967 Prague	3x1000m relay

Mikhail Zhelobovskiy (Belarusian: Міхаіл Жэлабоўскі; born 8 May 1946) is a Belarusian former long-distance runner who competed in the 1968 Summer Olympics.
