= 1974 European Athletics Championships – Men's 800 metres =

Men's 800 metres at the European Athletics Championships

The men's 800 metres at the 1974 European Athletics Championships was held in Rome, Italy, at Stadio Olimpico on 2, 3, and 4 September 1974.

The winning margin was 1.69 seconds which with the conclusion of the 2024 championships remains the only time the men's 800 metres has been won by more than a second at these championships.

== Medalists ==
Gold	Luciano Sušanj; Yugoslavia
Silver	Steve Ovett; Great Britain
Bronze	Markku Taskinen; Finland

== Results ==
=== Final ===
4 September

Rank	Name	Nationality	Time	Notes
1st place, gold medalist(s)	Luciano Sušanj	Yugoslavia	1:44.07	NR CR
2nd place, silver medalist(s)	Steve Ovett	Great Britain	1:45.76	
3rd place, bronze medalist(s)	Markku Taskinen	Finland	1:45.89	
4	Vladimir Ponomaryov	Soviet Union	1:46.02	
5	Gerhard Stolle	East Germany	1:46.19	
6	Marcello Fiasconaro	Italy	1:46.28	
7	Dieter Fromm	East Germany	1:46.29	
8	Willi Wülbeck	West Germany	1:46.31	

=== Semi-finals ===
3 September

==== Semi-final 1 ====
Rank	Name	Nationality	Time	Notes
1	Steve Ovett	Great Britain	1:47.1	Q
2	Luciano Sušanj	Yugoslavia	1:47.2	Q
3	Gerhard Stolle	East Germany	1:47.4	Q
4	Willi Wülbeck	West Germany	1:47.4	Q
5	Marcel Philippe	France	1:47.5	
6	Åke Svenson	Sweden	1:47.7	
7	Jozef Plachý	Czechoslovakia	1:47.9	
8	Hans-Henning Ohlert	East Germany	1:48.6	

==== Semi-final 2 ====
Rank	Name	Nationality	Time	Notes
1	Vladimir Ponomaryov	Soviet Union	1:47.6	Q
2	Marcello Fiasconaro	Italy	1:47.7	Q
3	Dieter Fromm	East Germany	1:47.7	Q
4	Markku Taskinen	Finland	1:47.7	Q
5	Gheorghe Ghipu	Romania	1:47.8	
6	Johan Van Wezer	Belgium	1:48.0	
7	Fernando Mamede	Portugal	1:48.5	
8	Josef Schmid	West Germany	1:48.6	

=== Heats ===
2 September

==== Heat 1 ====
Rank	Name	Nationality	Time	Notes
1	Johan Van Wezer	Belgium	1:47.7	Q
2	Gerhard Stolle	East Germany	1:47.7	Q
3	Marcello Fiasconaro	Italy	1:47.8	Q
4	Heinz Langenbach	West Germany	1:47.9	
5	David McMeekin	Great Britain	1:48.1	
6	Andrés Ballbé	Spain	1:48.2	
7	Günther Hasler	Liechtenstein	1:50.2	

==== Heat 2 ====
Rank	Name	Nationality	Time	Notes
1	Gheorghe Ghipu	Romania	1:46.9	Q
2	Steve Ovett	Great Britain	1:47.0	Q
3	Jozef Plachý	Czechoslovakia	1:47.1	Q
4	Vladimir Ponomaryov	Soviet Union	1:47.1	q
5	Fernando Mamede	Portugal	1:47.5	NR q
6	Åke Svenson	Sweden	1:47.5	q
7	Willi Wülbeck	West Germany	1:47.6	q

==== Heat 3 ====
Rank	Name	Nationality	Time	Notes
1	Luciano Sušanj	Yugoslavia	1:48.4	Q
2	Dieter Fromm	East Germany	1:48.6	Q
3	Markku Taskinen	Finland	1:48.7	Q
4	Sven-Erik Nielsen	Denmark	1:48.9	
5	Ján Šišovský	Czechoslovakia	1:48.9	
6	Stavros Mermingis	Greece	1:49.8	
7	Sven-Johan Svendsen	Norway	1:50.9	
	Sermet Timurlenk	Turkey	DNS	

==== Heat 4 ====
Rank	Name	Nationality	Time	Notes
1	Hans-Henning Ohlert	East Germany	1:49.7	Q
2	Marcel Philippe	France	1:49.8	Q
3	Josef Schmid	West Germany	1:49.9	Q
4	Pavel Litovchenko	Soviet Union	1:50.0	
5	Nicolae Onescu	Romania	1:50.1	
6	Jean Kaiser	Luxembourg	1:54.2	
	Andy Carter	Great Britain	DNS	

== Participation ==
According to an unofficial count, 27 athletes from 19 countries participated in the event.

- Belgium (1)
- Czechoslovakia (2)
- Denmark (1)
- East Germany (3)
- Finland (1)
- France (1)
- Greece (1)
- Italy (1)
- Liechtenstein (1)
- Luxembourg (1)
- Norway (1)
- Portugal (1)
- Romania (2)
- Soviet Union (2)
- Spain (1)
- Sweden (1)
- Great Britain (2)
- West Germany (3)
- Yugoslavia (1)
