= 1971 European Athletics Championships – Men's 800 metres =

Men's 800 metres at the European Athletics Championships

The men's 800 metres at the 1971 European Athletics Championships was held in Helsinki, Finland, at Helsinki Olympic Stadium on 10, 11, and 12 August 1971.

== Medalists ==
Gold	Yevgeniy Arzhanov; Soviet Union
Silver	Dieter Fromm; East Germany
Bronze	Andy Carter; Great Britain

== Results ==
=== Final ===
12 August

Rank	Name	Nationality	Time	Notes
1st place, gold medalist(s)	Yevgeniy Arzhanov	Soviet Union	1:45.62	CR
2nd place, silver medalist(s)	Dieter Fromm	East Germany	1:45.96	
3rd place, bronze medalist(s)	Andy Carter	Great Britain	1:46.16	NR
4	Hans-Henning Ohlert	East Germany	1:46.87	
5	Peter Browne	Great Britain	1:47.00	
6	Jozef Plachý	Czechoslovakia	1:47.33	
7	Jože Međimurec	Yugoslavia	1:48.44	
8	Philippe Meyer	France	1:50.91	

=== Semi-finals ===
11 August

==== Semi-final 1 ====
Rank	Name	Nationality	Time	Notes
1	Andy Carter	Great Britain	1:48.46	Q
2	Hans-Henning Ohlert	East Germany	1:48.66	Q
3	Jože Međimurec	Yugoslavia	1:48.92	Q
4	Philippe Meyer	France	1:48.94	Q
5	Stanisław Waśkiewicz	Poland	1:49.10	
6	Stanislav Meshcherskikh	Soviet Union	1:49.10	
7	Gerd Larsen	Denmark	1:49.33	
8	Markku Aalto	Finland	1:50.61	

==== Semi-final 2 ====
Rank	Name	Nationality	Time	Notes
1	Dieter Fromm	East Germany	1:48.60	Q
2	Yevgeniy Arzhanov	Soviet Union	1:48.96	Q
3	Peter Browne	Great Britain	1:49.03	Q
4	Jozef Plachý	Czechoslovakia	1:49.07	Q
5	Andrzej Kupczyk	Poland	1:49.28	
6	Antonio Fernández	Spain	1:49.92	
7	Sjef Hensgens	Netherlands	1:50.20	
8	Jens-Bodo Fried	West Germany	1:50.54	

=== Heats ===
10 August

==== Heat 1 ====
Rank	Name	Nationality	Time	Notes
1	Dieter Fromm	East Germany	1:48.81	Q
2	Jože Međimurec	Yugoslavia	1:49.15	Q
3	Antonio Fernández	Spain	1:49.29	Q
4	Markku Aalto	Finland	1:49.33	Q
5	Hans Bertram	West Germany	1:49.57	
6	Krzysztof Linkowski	Poland	1:51.67	
7	Ragnar Schie	Norway	1:54.21	

==== Heat 2 ====
Rank	Name	Nationality	Time	Notes
1	Andy Carter	Great Britain	1:46.82	Q
2	Jens-Bodo Fried	West Germany	1:47.43	Q
3	Stanislav Meshcherskikh	Soviet Union	1:47.49	Q
4	Sjef Hensgens	Netherlands	1:47.90	Q
5	Fernando Mamede	Portugal	1:48.44	NR
6	André Boonen	Belgium	1:49.61	
7	Aurelio Falero	Gibraltar	1:59.75	

==== Heat 3 ====
Rank	Name	Nationality	Time	Notes
1	Yevgeniy Arzhanov	Soviet Union	1:49.27	Q
2	Gerd Larsen	Denmark	1:49.31	Q
3	Stanisław Waśkiewicz	Poland	1:49.35	Q
4	Peter Browne	Great Britain	1:49.41	Q
5	Reiner Föhrenbach	West Germany	1:49.57	
6	Mehmet Tümkan	Turkey	1:49.80	

==== Heat 4 ====
Rank	Name	Nationality	Time	Notes
1	Hans-Henning Ohlert	East Germany	1:59.23	Q
2	Jozef Plachý	Czechoslovakia	2:00.09	Q
3	Andrzej Kupczyk	Poland	2:00.13	Q
4	Philippe Meyer	France	2:00.60	Q

== Participation ==
According to an unofficial count, 24 athletes from 17 countries participated in the event.

- Belgium (1)
- Czechoslovakia (1)
- Denmark (1)
- East Germany (2)
- Finland (1)
- France (1)
- Gibraltar (1)
- Netherlands (1)
- Norway (1)
- Poland (3)
- Portugal (1)
- Soviet Union (2)
- Spain (1)
- Turkey (1)
- Great Britain (2)
- West Germany (3)
- Yugoslavia (1)
