= Athletics at the 1972 Summer Olympics – Men's 800 metres =

Men's 800 metres at the Games of the XX Olympiad
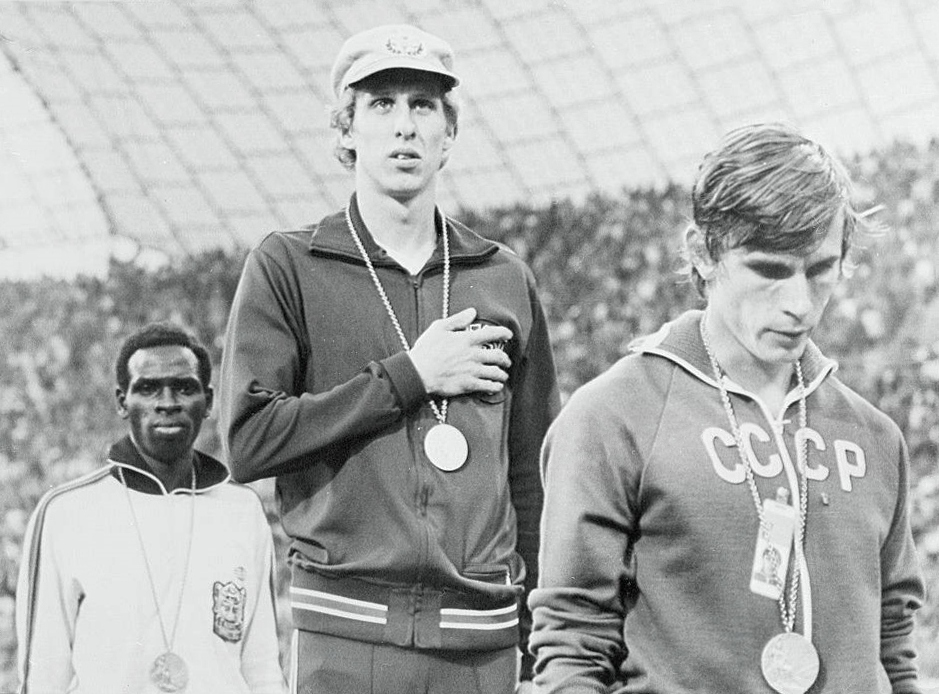
- Left-right: Mike Boit, Dave Wottle, Yevhen Arzhanov
- Venue: Olympic Stadium
- Dates: September 2, 1972
- Competitors: 61 from 46 nations
- Winning time: 1:45.86

Medalists
1st place, gold medalist(s)		Dave Wottle; United States
2nd place, silver medalist(s)		Yevhen Arzhanov; Soviet Union
3rd place, bronze medalist(s)		Mike Boit; Kenya

The men's 800 metres at the 1972 Summer Olympics in Munich, West Germany, took place on 2 September 1972. Sixty-one athletes from 46 nations competed. The maximum number of athletes per nation had been set at three since the 1930 Olympic Congress. The event was won by 0.03 seconds by Dave Wottle of the United States, the first title in the event for an American since 1956 and the eighth overall win in the men's 800 metres for the United States. Yevhen Arzhanov won the Soviet Union's first medal in the event with silver, while Mike Boit kept Kenya on the podium for the third straight Games with bronze.

Until the 2024 Olympic final, Wottle's winning margin of 0.03 seconds was the narrowest in the men's 800 meters at the Olympics since the introduction of fully automatic timing.

== Summary ==
The race went out very quickly for the first 200 m, with the two Kenyans, Boit and Ouko, pushing the pace. Wottle lagged far behind the rest of the field for the first 300 m, only catching up to the pack around the end of the first lap; the leaders went through the opening lap in 52.3 seconds. Yevhen Arzhanov, the pre-race favorite, made a strong move on the final backstretch, and with only 18 m remaining seemed to have clinched the victory; Wottle's final burst of speed, however, brought him across the line nine inches (23 cm) ahead of Arzhanov, who fell in desperation in the final step of the race.

Much has been written about Wottle's technique in winning this race with virtually even 26 second splits. What looked like blazing speed at the end was relative to the other runners who were losing speed after running the first part of the race so fast.

Wottle had equaled the world record winning the US trials. Still, few had expected Wottle, who had suffered tendinitis in his knees earlier that summer, to defeat Arzhanov, as the Soviet had not lost an 800 m final in four years; Wottle himself was so surprised at winning the race that he forgot to remove his golf cap when the U.S. national anthem was played at the medal ceremony. When reporters later asked him if his failure to remove the cap, a good luck charm which he always wore while racing, was a protest against the Vietnam War, Wottle replied that he had merely forgotten and formally apologized to the American people.

== Background ==
This was the 17th appearance of the event, which is one of 12 athletics events to have been held at every Summer Olympics. None of the 1968 medalists returned, but the four finalists placed from fourth to seventh did: Walter Adams of West Germany, Jozef Plachý of Czechoslovakia, Dieter Fromm of East Germany, and Thomas Saisi of Kenya. Yevhen Arzhanov of the Soviet Union, who had reached but did not start in the semifinals in 1968, had been dominant in the intervening four years, including wins at the 1971 European and European indoor championships. Dave Wottle had matched the world record at the U.S. Olympic trials, but was not completely healthy.

Algeria, Burma, the Republic of the Congo, Lebanon, Madagascar, Malawi, Nigeria, Panama, Romania, Somalia, Togo, and Zambia appeared in the event for the first time. Great Britain and the United States each made their 16th appearance, tied for the most among all nations.

== Competition format ==
The competition used the three-round format that had been in use for most Games since 1912. The "fastest loser" system introduced in 1964 was used for the semifinals. There were eight first-round heats, each with 8 athletes (before withdrawals); the top three runners in each heat advanced to the semifinals. There were three semifinals with 8 athletes each; the top two runners in each semifinal, and the next two fastest overall, advanced to the eight-man final.

== Records ==
Prior to the competition, the existing world and Olympic records were as follows.

World record	Peter Snell (NZL)	1:44.3	Christchurch, New Zealand	2 February 1962
Olympic record	Ralph Doubell (AUS)	1:44.3	Mexico City, Mexico	15 October 1968

No world or Olympic records were set during the competition.

== Schedule ==
All times are Central European Time (UTC+1)

Date	Time	Round
Thursday, 31 August 1972	15:00	Round 1
Friday, 1 September 1972	16:00	Semifinals
Saturday, 2 September 1972	17:00	Final

== Results ==
=== Round 1 ===
Qualification rule: First 3 of each heat advance directly (Q) to the semifinals.

==== Heat 1 ====
Rank	Athlete	Nation	Time	Notes
1	Alain Sans	France	1:49.2	Q
2	Mansour Guettaya	Tunisia	1:49.4	Q
3	Azzedine Azzouzi	Algeria	1:49.4	Q
4	Rick Wohlhuter	United States	1:49.4	
5	Reza Entezari	Iran	1:50.5	
6	Édouard Rasoanaivo	Madagascar	1:50.8	
7	Alphonse Mandonda	Republic of the Congo	1:51.2	
—	Mohamed Aboker	Somalia	DSQ	

==== Heat 2 ====
Rank	Athlete	Nation	Time	Notes
1	Robert Ouko	Kenya	1:47.4	Q
2	Jože Međimurec	Yugoslavia	1:48.1	Q
3	Yevhen Volkov	Soviet Union	1:48.6	Q
4	Fernando Mamede	Portugal	1:48.6	
5	Mohamed Sid Ali Djouadi	Algeria	1:50.4	
6	Colin Campbell	Great Britain	1:54.8	
7	Francisco Menocal	Nicaragua	1:58.6	
8	Thomas Howe	Liberia	2:00.7	

==== Heat 3 ====
Rank	Athlete	Nation	Time	Notes
1	Franz-Josef Kemper	West Germany	1:47.3	Q
2	Dave Cropper	Great Britain	1:47.5	Q
3	Rolf Gysin	Switzerland	1:47.5	Q
4	Roqui Sanchez	France	1:47.9	
5	Thomas Saisi	Kenya	1:48.5	
6	András Zsinka	Hungary	1:49.0	
7	Daniel Andrade	Senegal	1:53.9	
—	Saad Maaz Abdulrazak	Saudi Arabia	DNS	

==== Heat 4 ====
Rank	Athlete	Nation	Time	Notes
1	Mulugetta Tadesse	Ethiopia	1:47.1	Q
2	Dave Wottle	United States	1:47.6	Q
3	Josef Schmid	West Germany	1:47.8	Q
4	Graeme Rootham	Australia	1:48.2	
5	Lennox Stewart	Trinidad and Tobago	1:48.7	
6	Þorsteinn Þorsteinsson	Iceland	1:50.8	
7	Roger Kangni	Togo	1:52.1	
—	M'Hamad Amakdouf	Morocco	DNS	

==== Heat 5 ====
Rank	Athlete	Nation	Time	Notes
1	Yevhen Arzhanov	Soviet Union	1:48.3	Q
2	Andrzej Kupczyk	Poland	1:48.5	Q
3	Nimir Hussein Angelo Koko	Sudan	1:48.9	Q
4	Gheorghe Ghipu	Romania	1:50.1	
5	Carlos Dalurzo	Argentina	1:50.6	
6	Héctor López	Venezuela	1:50.8	
—	Walter Adams	West Germany	DNF	
—	Antonio Fernández	Spain	DSQ	

==== Heat 6 ====
Rank	Athlete	Nation	Time	Notes
1	Dieter Fromm	East Germany	1:46.9	Q
2	Jozef Plachý	Czechoslovakia	1:47.1	Q
3	Manuel Gayoso	Spain	1:47.5	Q
4	Sriram Singh	India	1:47.7	
5	Francis Gonzalez	France	1:48.8	
6	Mehmet Tümkan	Turkey	1:49.5	
7	Kassem Hamzé	Lebanon	1:52.5	
8	Harry Nkopeka	Malawi	1:57.7	

==== Heat 7 ====
Rank	Athlete	Nation	Time	Notes
1	Mike Boit	Kenya	1:47.3	Q
2	Herman Mignon	Belgium	1:47.5	Q
3	Andy Carter	Great Britain	1:47.6	Q
4	Byron Dyce	Jamaica	1:48.0	
5	Benson Mulomba	Zambia	1:53.4	
6	Jimmy Crampton	Burma	1:54.2	
7	Fritz Pierre	Haiti	2:01.5	
—	Franco Arese	Italy	DNS	

==== Heat 8 ====
Rank	Athlete	Nation	Time	Notes
1	Ivan Ivanov	Soviet Union	1:51.0	Q
2	Ken Swenson	United States	1:51.1	Q
3	Francis Murphy	Ireland	1:51.1	Q
4	Sjef Hensgens	Netherlands	1:51.2	
5	Donaldo Arza	Panama	1:51.2	
6	Jaiye Abidoye	Nigeria	1:52.0	
7	Muhammad Siddique	Pakistan	1:52.6	
8	Shibrou Regassa	Ethiopia	1:53.3	

=== Semifinals ===
Qualification rule: First 2 of each semifinal (Q) and the next 2 fastest (q) advance to the final.

==== Semifinal 1 ====
Rank	Athlete	Nation	Time	Notes
1	Robert Ouko	Kenya	1:47.6	Q
2	Dieter Fromm	East Germany	1:48.1	Q
3	Dave Cropper	Great Britain	1:48.4	
4	Josef Schmid	West Germany	1:48.8	
5	Francis Murphy	Ireland	1:49.2	
6	Azzedine Azzouzi	Algeria	1:49.4	
7	Alain Sans	France	1:49.6	
8	Yevgeniy Volkov	Soviet Union	1:50.1	

==== Semifinal 2 ====
Rank	Athlete	Nation	Time	Notes
1	Dave Wottle	United States	1:48.7	Q
2	Franz-Josef Kemper	West Germany	1:48.8	Q
3	Jozef Plachý	Czechoslovakia	1:48.9	
4	Jože Međimurec	Yugoslavia	1:49.0	
5	Ivan Ivanov	Soviet Union	1:49.6	
6	Herman Mignon	Belgium	1:49.7	
7	Mansour Guettaya	Tunisia	1:49.8	
8	Nimir Hussein Angelo Koko	Sudan	1:51.1	

==== Semifinal 3 ====
Rank	Athlete	Nation	Time	Notes
1	Mike Boit	Kenya	1:45.9	Q
2	Yevhen Arzhanov	Soviet Union	1:46.3	Q
3	Andy Carter	Great Britain	1:46.5	q
4	Andrzej Kupczyk	Poland	1:46.7	q
5	Manuel Gayoso	Spain	1:47.7	
6	Rolf Gysin	Switzerland	1:48.2	
7	Mulugetta Tadesse	Ethiopia	1:48.9	
—	Ken Swenson	United States	DNF	

=== Final ===
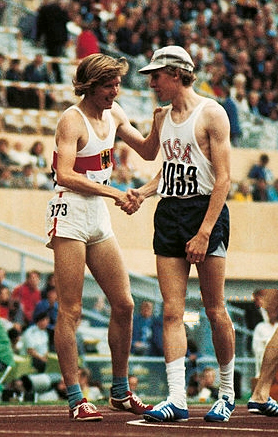
Franz-Josef Kemper (left) congratulates the winner Dave Wottle

Rank	Athlete	Nation	Time
1st place, gold medalist(s)	Dave Wottle	United States	1:45.86
2nd place, silver medalist(s)	Yevhen Arzhanov	Soviet Union	1:45.89
3rd place, bronze medalist(s)	Mike Boit	Kenya	1:46.01
4	Franz-Josef Kemper	West Germany	1:46.50
5	Robert Ouko	Kenya	1:46.53
6	Andy Carter	Great Britain	1:46.55
7	Andrzej Kupczyk	Poland	1:47.10
8	Dieter Fromm	East Germany	1:47.96
