= 1973 European Athletics Indoor Championships – Men's 800 metres =

The men's 800 metres event at the 1973 European Athletics Indoor Championships was held on 10 and 11 March in Rotterdam.

== Medalists ==
Gold	Silver	Bronze
Francis Gonzalez; France	Gerhard Stolle; East Germany	Jozef Plachý; Czechoslovakia

== Results ==
=== Heats ===
Held on 10 March.

First 2 from each heat (Q) qualified directly for the final.

Rank	Heat	Name	Nationality	Time	Notes
1	2	Gerhard Stolle	East Germany	1:48.54	Q
2	3	Francis Gonzalez	France	1:49.21	Q
3	3	Hans-Henning Ohlert	East Germany	1:49.54	Q
4	1	Jozef Plachý	Czechoslovakia	1:49.59	Q
5	3	Andrzej Kupczyk	Poland	1:49.60	
6	2	Antonio Fernández	Spain	1:49.83	Q, NR
7	3	Peter Browne	Great Britain	1:49.86	
8	1	Jože Međimurec	Yugoslavia	1:50.04	Q
9	2	Philippe Meyer	France	1:50.13	
10	1	Rolf Gysin	Switzerland	1:50.14	
11	2	Ján Šišovský	Czechoslovakia	1:50.16	
11	3	Robert Hoofd	Belgium	1:50.16	
13	2	András Zsinka	Hungary	1:50.46	
14	1	Andre Boonen	Belgium	1:50.66	
15	2	Jan Reijnders	Netherlands	1:51.24	
16	1	Yves Gringoire	France	1:51.46	
17	1	Martin Moser	Netherlands	1:52.27	
18	3	Jozef Samborský	Czechoslovakia	1:52.60	

=== Final ===
Held on 11 March.

Rank	Name	Nationality	Time	Notes
1st place, gold medalist(s)	Francis Gonzalez	France	1:49.17	
2nd place, silver medalist(s)	Gerhard Stolle	East Germany	1:49.32	
3rd place, bronze medalist(s)	Jozef Plachý	Czechoslovakia	1:49.50	
4	Hans-Henning Ohlert	East Germany	1:49.62	
5	Jože Međimurec	Yugoslavia	1:49.65	
6	Antonio Fernández	Spain	1:50.79	
