= Athletics at the 1970 Summer Universiade – Men's 800 metres =

The men's 800 metres event at the 1970 Summer Universiade was held at the Stadio Comunale in Turin on 3, 4 and 5 September 1970.

== Medalists ==
| Gold | Silver | Bronze |
|---|---|---|
| Franz-Josef Kemper; West Germany | Martin Winbolt-Lewis; Great Britain | Donaldo Arza; Panama |

== Results ==
=== Heats ===
| Rank | Heat | Athlete | Nationality | Time | Notes |
|---|---|---|---|---|---|
| 1 | 1 | Franz-Josef Kemper | West Germany | 1:53.0 | Q |
| 2 | 1 | Antonio Fernández | Spain | 1:53.0 | Q |
| 3 | 1 | Petar Kyatovsi | Bulgaria | 1:53.1 | Q |
| 4 | 1 | Atilio Alegre | Brazil | 1:53.9 | q |
| 5 | 1 | Mohamed Mounir Hamoud | Kuwait | 2:04.6 | |
| 1 | 2 | Dave Wottle | United States | 1:52.6 | Q |
| 2 | 2 | Godehard Brysch | West Germany | 1:52.6 | Q |
| 3 | 2 | Leandro Civil | Cuba | 1:53.0 | Q |
| 4 | 2 | Daniel Andrade | Senegal | 1:54.0 | q |
| 5 | 2 | Robert Jopa | Luxembourg | 1:55.4 | |
| 1 | 3 | Andy Carter | Great Britain | 1:51.7 | Q |
| 2 | 3 | Jean Danic | France | 1:51.7 | Q |
| 3 | 3 | Amor Lassoued | Tunisia | 1:51.8 | Q |
| 4 | 3 | Jacques Anseeuw | Belgium | 1:54.8 | |
| 5 | 3 | Yayino Yemane | Ethiopia | 1:55.3 | |
| 6 | 3 | Erasmo Gómez | Nicaragua | 1:59.4 | |
| 1 | 4 | Donaldo Arza | Panama | 1:50.7 | Q |
| 2 | 4 | Martin Winbolt-Lewis | Great Britain | 1:50.7 | Q |
| 3 | 4 | Slavko Koprivica | Yugoslavia | 1:51.3 | Q |
| 4 | 4 | Dario Bonetti | Italy | 1:51.5 | q |
| 5 | 4 | Thomas Sarongsong | Indonesia | 1:54.4 | q |
| 6 | 4 | Rauf Dimraj | Albania | 1:55.5 | |
| 7 | 4 | Tadesha Boru | Ethiopia | 1:56.9 | |

=== Semifinals ===
| Rank | Heat | Athlete | Nationality | Time | Notes |
|---|---|---|---|---|---|
| 1 | 1 | Andy Carter | Great Britain | 1:49.2 | Q |
| 2 | 1 | Godehard Brysch | West Germany | 1:49.2 | Q |
| 3 | 1 | Petar Kyatovsi | Bulgaria | 1:49.4 | Q |
| 4 | 1 | Donaldo Arza | Panama | 1:49.5 | Q |
| 5 | 1 | Dave Wottle | United States | 1:49.6 | |
| 6 | 1 | Leandro Civil | Cuba | 1:50.2 | |
| 7 | 1 | Dario Bonetti | Italy | 1:50.6 | |
| 8 | 1 | Thomas Sarongsong | Indonesia | 1:54.1 | |
| 1 | 2 | Martin Winbolt-Lewis | Great Britain | 1:49.8 | Q |
| 2 | 2 | Franz-Josef Kemper | West Germany | 1:49.8 | Q |
| 3 | 2 | Antonio Fernández | Spain | 1:49.9 | Q |
| 4 | 2 | Jean Danic | France | 1:50.0 | Q |
| 5 | 2 | Slavko Koprivica | Yugoslavia | 1:50.1 | |
| 6 | 2 | Amor Lassoued | Tunisia | 1:50.4 | |
| 7 | 2 | Atilio Alegre | Brazil | 1:51.2 | |
| 8 | 2 | Daniel Andrade | Senegal | 1:54.0 | |

=== Final ===
| Rank | Name | Nationality | Time | Notes |
|---|---|---|---|---|
| 1st place, gold medalist(s) | Franz-Josef Kemper | West Germany | 1:49.1 | |
| 2nd place, silver medalist(s) | Martin Winbolt-Lewis | Great Britain | 1:49.2 | |
| 3rd place, bronze medalist(s) | Donaldo Arza | Panama | 1:49.5 | |
| 4 | Antonio Fernández | Spain | 1:50.3 | |
| 5 | Jean Danic | France | 1:50.3 | |
| 6 | Godehard Brysch | West Germany | 1:50.7 | |
| 7 | Andy Carter | Great Britain | 1:50.9 | |
| 8 | Petar Kyatovsi | Bulgaria | 1:51.7 | |
