= 1975 European Athletics Indoor Championships – Men's 800 metres =

The men's 800 metres event at the 1975 European Athletics Indoor Championships was held on 8 and 9 March in Katowice.

== Medalists ==
Gold	Silver	Bronze
Gerhard Stolle; East Germany	Ivo Van Damme; Belgium	Vladimir Ponomaryev; Soviet Union

== Results ==
=== Heats ===
Held on 8 March.
First 2 from each heat (Q) and the next 2 fastest (q) qualified for the semifinals.

Rank	Heat	Name	Nationality	Time	Notes
1	1	Jozef Plachý	Czechoslovakia	1:50.6	Q
2	1	Ivo Van Damme	Belgium	1:50.8	Q
3	2	Vladimir Ponomaryev	Soviet Union	1:51.6	Q
4	1	Reinhold Soyka	West Germany	1:51.7	q
5	2	Gerhard Stolle	East Germany	1:51.9	Q
6	2	Marian Gęsicki	Poland	1:51.9	q
7	2	Ladislav Kárský	Czechoslovakia	1:52.6	
8	2	Robert Hoofd	Belgium	1:52.7	
9	1	Erwin Gohlke	East Germany	1:54.3	
10	1	Viktor Solonetskiy	Soviet Union	1:54.7	
11	1	Waldemar Gondek	Poland	1:55.8	
12	2	Krzysztof Linkowski	Poland	1:57.2	
13	1	Åke Svenson	Sweden	1:57.9	

=== Final ===
Held on 9 March.

Rank	Name	Nationality	Time	Notes
1st place, gold medalist(s)	Gerhard Stolle	East Germany	1:49.8	
2nd place, silver medalist(s)	Ivo Van Damme	Belgium	1:50.1	
3rd place, bronze medalist(s)	Vladimir Ponomaryov	Soviet Union	1:50.2	
4	Jozef Plachý	Czechoslovakia	1:50.2	
5	Marian Gęsicki	Poland	1:50.4	
6	Reinhold Soyka	West Germany	1:53.3	
