= 1972 European Athletics Indoor Championships – Men's 800 metres =

The men's 800 metres event at the 1972 European Athletics Indoor Championships was held on 11 and 12 March in Grenoble.

== Medalists ==
Gold	Silver	Bronze
Jozef Plachý; Czechoslovakia	Ivan Ivanov; Soviet Union	Francis Gonzalez; France

== Results ==
=== Heats ===
First 4 from each heat (Q) qualified directly for the final.

Held on 11 March

Rank	Heat	Name	Nationality	Time	Notes
1	2	Jozef Plachý	Czechoslovakia	1:49.92	Q
2	2	Manuel Gayoso	Spain	1:50.15	Q, NR
3	2	Peter Browne	Great Britain	1:50.88	Q
4	2	Jan Reijnders	Netherlands	1:50.91	Q
5	1	Ivan Ivanov	Soviet Union	1:59.57	Q
6	1	Francis Gonzalez	France	1:59.83	Q
7	1	András Zsinka	Hungary	2:00.19	Q
8	1	Þorsteinn Þorsteinsson	Iceland	2:05.37	Q
9	1	Jože Međimurec	Yugoslavia	2:12.24	

=== Final ===
Held on 12 March

Rank	Name	Nationality	Time	Notes
1st place, gold medalist(s)	Jozef Plachý	Czechoslovakia	1:48.84	NR
2nd place, silver medalist(s)	Ivan Ivanov	Soviet Union	1:49.05	
3rd place, bronze medalist(s)	Francis Gonzalez	France	1:49.17	
4	András Zsinka	Hungary	1:50.62	
5	Peter Browne	Great Britain	1:51.27	
6	Manuel Gayoso	Spain	1:52.15	
7	Þorsteinn Þorsteinsson	Iceland	1:53.26	NR
	Jan Reijnders	Netherlands	DNS	
