= Athletics at the 1973 Summer Universiade – Men's 800 metres =

The men's 800 metres event at the 1973 Summer Universiade was held at the Central Lenin Stadium in Moscow on 16, 17 and 18 August.

== Medalists ==
Gold	Silver	Bronze
Yevgeniy Arzhanov; Soviet Union	Marcel Philippe; France	Hans-Henning Ohlert; East Germany

== Results ==
=== Heats ===
Rank	Heat	Athlete	Nationality	Time	Notes
1	1	Phil Lewis	Great Britain	1:50.82	Q
2	1	Ján Šišovský	Czechoslovakia	1:51.11	Q
3	1	Ken Schappert	United States	1:51.33	
4	1	Piet Bouquillon	Belgium	1:53.7	
5	1	Hassan Radhi Makki	Kuwait	1:56.0	
6	1	Emmanuil Wellington	Ghana	2:01.5	
	1	Sékou Barry	Guinea	DNF	
1	2	Sándor Fekete	Hungary	1:48.75	Q
2	2	Rainer Burmester	West Germany	1:48.88	Q
3	2	David McMeekin	Great Britain	1:49.10	q
4	2	Liévin De Reymaecker	Belgium	1:55.4	
5	2	Prosper Boukoulou	Congo	1:56.9	
6	2	Shakir Sheikli	Iraq	1:57.3	
7	2	Dangaajav Battulga	Mongolia	2:07.2	
1	3	Andrzej Kupczyk	Poland	1:49.16	Q
2	3	Yevgeniy Volkov	Soviet Union	1:49.16	Q
3	3	Philippe Meyer	France	1:50.03	q
4	3	Jorge Cerda	Mexico	1:55.6	
5	3	Abbas Hassan Ahmed	Kuwait	2:00.7	
6	3	Carmel Debono	Malta	2:07.1	
7	3	Álvarez Chávez	Honduras	2:24.8	
1	4	Rick Brown	United States	1:50.20	Q
2	4	Marcel Philippe	France	1:50.35	Q
3	4	Adelio Diamante	Italy	1:50.9	q
4	4	Mark Sang	Kenya	1:51.2	q
5	4	Günther Hasler	Liechtenstein	1:52.1	
6	4	Tawfik Boulenouar	Algeria	2:01.8	
7	4	Victor Álvarez	Honduras	2:07.9	
1	5	Hans-Henning Ohlert	East Germany	1:51.51	Q
2	5	Sid Ali Djouadi	Algeria	1:51.60	Q
3	5	Vittorio Fontanella	Italy	1:51.6	
4	5	Luis Medina	Cuba	1:52.5	
5	5	Jean Kaiser	Luxembourg	1:54.5	
6	5	Marc Ounezoui	Central African Republic	1:58.6	
7	5	Ikaka Cheya	Sudan	1:59.4	
1	6	Yevgeniy Arzhanov	Soviet Union	1:50.76	Q
2	6	Gerhard Stolle	East Germany	1:51.22	Q
3	6	Petar Kyatovski	Bulgaria	1:51.66	
4	6	Leandro Civil	Cuba	1:51.7	
5	6	Francisco Méndez	Mexico	1:52.6	
6	6	Lukan Lukanov	Bulgaria	1:53.1	
7	6	Jaime Valencia	Chile	1:58.2	

=== Semifinals ===
Rank	Heat	Athlete	Nationality	Time	Notes
1	1	Yevgeniy Arzhanov	Soviet Union	1:48.2	Q
2	1	Rick Brown	United States	1:49.0	Q
3	1	Gerhard Stolle	East Germany	1:49.0	Q
4	1	Rainer Burmester	West Germany	1:49.38	
5	1	David McMeekin	Great Britain	1:49.6	
6	1	Adelio Diamante	Italy	1:49.7	
7	1	Philippe Meyer	France	1:51.13	
	1	Sid Ali Djouadi	Algeria	?	
1	2	Marcel Philippe	France	1:46.90	Q
2	2	Hans-Henning Ohlert	East Germany	1:47.23	Q
3	2	Andrzej Kupczyk	Poland	1:47.48	Q
4	2	Phil Lewis	Great Britain	1:47.58	q
5	2	Ján Šišovský	Czechoslovakia	1:47.80	q
6	2	Sándor Fekete	Hungary	1:48.4	
7	2	Yevgeniy Volkov	Soviet Union	1:48.60	
8	2	Mark Sang	Kenya	1:50.3	

=== Final ===
Rank	Athlete	Nationality	Time	Notes
1st place, gold medalist(s)	Yevgeniy Arzhanov	Soviet Union	1:46.88	
2nd place, silver medalist(s)	Marcel Philippe	France	1:47.29	
3rd place, bronze medalist(s)	Hans-Henning Ohlert	East Germany	1:47.51	
4	Rick Brown	United States	1:47.61	
5	Andrzej Kupczyk	Poland	1:47.96	
6	Phil Lewis	Great Britain	1:48.0	
7	Gerhard Stolle	East Germany	1:48.02	
8	Ján Šišovský	Czechoslovakia	1:49.53	
