= 1974 European Athletics Indoor Championships – Men's 800 metres =

The men's 800 metres event at the 1974 European Athletics Indoor Championships was held on 9 and 10 March in Gothenburg.

== Medalists ==
| Gold | Silver | Bronze |
|---|---|---|
| Luciano Sušanj; Yugoslavia | András Zsinka; Hungary | Jozef Plachý; Czechoslovakia |

== Results ==
=== Heats ===
Held on 9 March.
First 2 from each heat (Q) qualified directly for the final.

| Rank | Heat | Name | Nationality | Time | Notes |
|---|---|---|---|---|---|
| 1 | 1 | Rolf Gysin | Switzerland | 1:49.73 | Q |
| 2 | 1 | Philippe Meyer | France | 1:49.75 | Q |
| 3 | 2 | András Zsinka | Hungary | 1:49.77 | Q |
| 4 | 1 | Markku Aalto | Finland | 1:49.81 | |
| 5 | 2 | Jozef Plachý | Czechoslovakia | 1:49.97 | Q |
| 6 | 1 | Åke Svenson | Sweden | 1:50.30 | |
| 7 | 3 | Luciano Sušanj | Yugoslavia | 1:50.34 | Q |
| 8 | 2 | Ivo Van Damme | Belgium | 1:50.56 | |
| 8 | 3 | Michał Skowronek | Poland | 1:50.56 | Q |
| 10 | 3 | Ján Šišovský | Czechoslovakia | 1:50.67 | |
| 11 | 2 | Vittorio Fontanella | Italy | 1:50.79 | |
| 12 | 3 | Antonio Fernández | Spain | 1:52.89 | |

=== Final ===
Held on 10 March.

| Rank | Name | Nationality | Time | Notes |
|---|---|---|---|---|
| 1st place, gold medalist(s) | Luciano Sušanj | Yugoslavia | 1:48.07 | NR |
| 2nd place, silver medalist(s) | András Zsinka | Hungary | 1:48.50 | |
| 3rd place, bronze medalist(s) | Jozef Plachý | Czechoslovakia | 1:49.49 | |
| 4 | Rolf Gysin | Switzerland | 1:50.70 | |
| 5 | Michał Skowronek | Poland | 1:51.28 | |
| 6 | Philippe Meyer | France | 1:57.48 | |
