= Mike Boit =

Kenyan middle-distance athlete

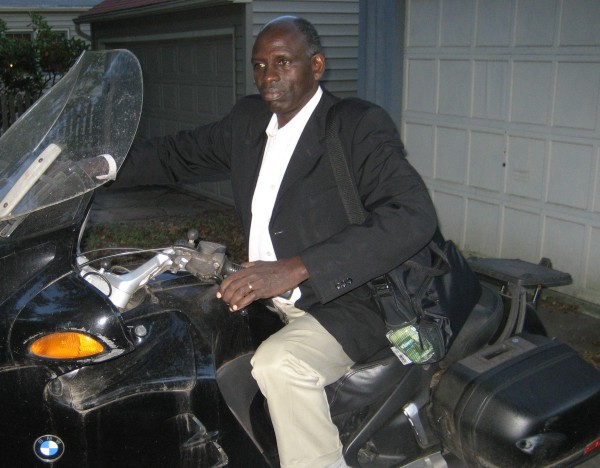
- Boit in 2006

Personal information
- Full name: Michael Kipsugut Boit
- Born: 6 January 1949 (age 77) Eldoret, Kenya
- Height: 180 cm (5 ft 11 in)
- Weight: 68 kg (150 lb)

Sport
- Club: Kenyatta University

Achievements and titles
- Personal bests: 800 m – 1:43.57 (1976); 1500 m – 3:33.67 (1981); Mile – 3:49.45 (1981)
Medal record
Men's athletics
Representing Kenya
Olympic Games
Bronze medal – third place	1972 Munich	800 metres
Commonwealth Games
Gold medal – first place	1978 Edmonton	800 metres
Silver medal – second place	1974 Christchurch	800 metres
Bronze medal – third place	1982 Brisbane	1500 metres
African Championships
Gold medal – first place	1979 Dakar	1500 metres
IAAF World Cup
Silver medal – second place	1977 Düsseldorf	800 metres

Michael Kipsugut Boit (born 6 January 1949) is a Kenyan former professional middle-distance athlete whose career spanned fifteen years. He is a professor at Kenyatta University in the Department of Exercise and Sports Science. He is an uncle to Philip Boit, who became the first Kenyan athlete to compete in the Winter Olympics.

== Education ==
Boit graduated from St. Patrick's High School in Iten in 1969, a school well known for having produced such world class distance runners as Matthew Birir, David Rudisha, Wilson Kipketer, Japheth Kimutai and many others. Boit received a Diploma from Kenyatta College (now Kenyatta University) in 1972, a bachelor's degree from Eastern New Mexico University in 1976, two master's degrees from Stanford University in 1977 and 1978, and a Doctorate of Education Degree from the University of Oregon in 1986. In 2014, Boit received an honorary Doctorate of Science (DSc) from the University of Glasgow in recognition of his contributions to the academic research of sports and its development in Kenya.

== Teaching and administration ==
Boit joined the Kenyatta University as a full-time faculty member in 1987. From 1990 to 1997, Boit took leave of his position at the University to work as the Kenya Commissioner of Sports; Boit returned to Kenyatta University in 1998.

During the 1990s, Boit also stayed active in the athletics community as a member of the IAAF Athletes Commission from 1989 to 1999 and the Special Olympics from 1992 to 1995.

In 2004, Boit and his friend John Manners, whom he met while in high school when Manners was in the Peace Corps, set up KENSAP, the Kenya Scholar-Athlete Project. The project helps bright students from under-served regions of Kenya gain admission to elite colleges in the United States.

== Athletics career ==
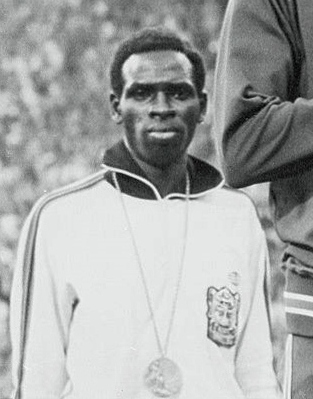
Boit at the 1972 Olympics

Representing St. Patrick's – Iten, Boit won the Kenya national high school title in the 800 metres in 1969. He later went on to win the 800 metres bronze medal at the 1972 Munich Olympics, in a race better known for the last-to-first comeback kick by US Olympian Dave Wottle. Boit also earned a fourth-place finish in the 1500 metres behind fellow legendary Kenyan runner Kipchoge Keino.

A Kenya boycott of the 1976 Montreal Olympics and 1980 Moscow Olympics denied Boit a second chance for Olympic glory. Boit however remained one of the world's top middle distance runners throughout the 1970s winning the 800 metres silver medal at the 1974 Commonwealth Games and a silver medal at the 1977 World Cup of Athletics in a much anticipated face-off against the 1976 Olympic gold medalist Alberto Juantorena of Cuba. He finished 2nd at the 1977 IAAF World Cup 800 metres race.

Boit won the gold at the 1978 Commonwealth Games and a bronze in the 1500 metres at the 1982 Commonwealth Games. He won the 1500 metres at the 1st African Championships in 1979. In Sebastian Coe's record breaking Summer of 81 Boit could often be seen at Coe's shoulder in 1500 metre and mile races, pushing him all the way to the line as the records tumbled. In 1983 Boit ran a downhill mile in 3:28.36, the then fastest mile in history. This did not count as the world record because of the course's downhill grade. Boit ended his athletic career in 1990 breaking the Masters Division Indoor World Record for the mile in Meadowlands, New Jersey.
