= Hensgens =

Hensgens is a surname. Notable people with the surname include:

- Bob Hensgens (fl. 2007), American politician
- Sjef Hensgens (1948–2024), Dutch middle-distance runner
