= Sjef =

Sjef is a given name. Notable people with the given name include:

- Sjef Hensgens (1948–2024), Dutch middle-distance runner
- Sjef Janssen (born 1950), Dutch dressage coach
- Sjef Mertens (1926–2004), Dutch footballer
- Sjef van den Berg (born 1995), Dutch competitive archer
- Sjef van Run (1904–1973), Dutch footballer
