= 1976 European Athletics Indoor Championships – Men's 800 metres =

The men's 800 metres event at the 1976 European Athletics Indoor Championships was held on 21 and 22 February in Munich.

== Medalists ==
Gold	Silver	Bronze
Ivo Van Damme; Belgium	Josef Schmid; West Germany	Milovan Savić; Yugoslavia

== Results ==
=== Heats ===
First 3 from each heat (Q) qualified directly for the final.

Rank	Heat	Name	Nationality	Time	Notes
1	1	Francis Gonzalez	France	1:49.8	Q
2	1	Ivo Van Damme	Belgium	1:49.8	Q
3	1	Milovan Savić	Yugoslavia	1:50.0	Q
4	1	Ladislav Kárský	Czechoslovakia	1:50.1	
5	2	András Zsinka	Hungary	1:50.1	Q
6	2	Josef Schmid	West Germany	1:50.9	Q
7	2	Robert Hoofd	Belgium	1:50.9	Q
8	2	Carlo Grippo	Italy	1:51.7	
9	2	Konstantinos Gargarettas	Greece	1:52.0	
	1	Phil Lewis	Great Britain	DNF	

=== Final ===
Rank	Name	Nationality	Time	Notes
1st place, gold medalist(s)	Ivo Van Damme	Belgium	1:49.2	
2nd place, silver medalist(s)	Josef Schmid	West Germany	1:49.8	
3rd place, bronze medalist(s)	Milovan Savić	Yugoslavia	1:49.9	
4	András Zsinka	Hungary	1:50.4	
5	Robert Hoofd	Belgium	1:50.7	
6	Francis Gonzalez	France	1:50.9	
