= Arzhanov =

Arzhanov (Russian: Аржанов) is a Russian masculine surname, its feminine counterpart is Arzhanova. It originates from ржаной meaning (of) rye. It may refer to:

- Volodymyr Arzhanov (born 1985), Ukrainian football midfielder
- Yevhen Arzhanov (born 1948), Ukrainian middle-distance runner
