= 1971 European Athletics Indoor Championships – Men's 800 metres =

The men's 800 metres event at the 1971 European Athletics Indoor Championships was held on 13 and 14 March in Sofia.

== Medalists ==
Gold	Silver	Bronze
Yevgeniy Arzhanov; Soviet Union	Phil Lewis; Great Britain	Andrzej Kupczyk; Poland

== Results ==
=== Heats ===
Held on 13 March

First 2 from each heat (Q) qualified directly for the final.

Rank	Heat	Name	Nationality	Time	Notes
1	1	John Davies	Great Britain	1:51.8	Q
2	1	Petar Kyatovski	Bulgaria	1:51.9	Q
3	1	Slavko Koprivica	Yugoslavia	1:52.5	
1	2	Antonio Fernández	Spain	1:54.0	Q
2	2	Phil Lewis	Great Britain	1:54.3	Q
3	2	Atanas Atanasov	Bulgaria	1:54.4	
4	2	Stavros Mermingis	Greece	1:57.8	
5	2	Ali Erte	Turkey	1:58.0	
1	3	Yevgeniy Arzhanov	Soviet Union	1:54.1	Q
2	3	Andrzej Kupczyk	Poland	1:54.3	Q
3	3	Ján Šišovský	Czechoslovakia	1:54.7	
4	3	Eric Reygaert	Belgium	1:56.5	

=== Final ===
Held on 14 March

Rank	Name	Nationality	Time	Notes
1st place, gold medalist(s)	Yevgeniy Arzhanov	Soviet Union	1:48.7	
2nd place, silver medalist(s)	Phil Lewis	Great Britain	1:50.5	
3rd place, bronze medalist(s)	Andrzej Kupczyk	Poland	1:50.5	
4	John Davies	Great Britain	1:51.1	
5	Petar Kyatovski	Bulgaria	1:52.0	
6	Antonio Fernández	Spain	1:52.7	
