= Marcel Philippe (athlete) =

French middle-distance runner

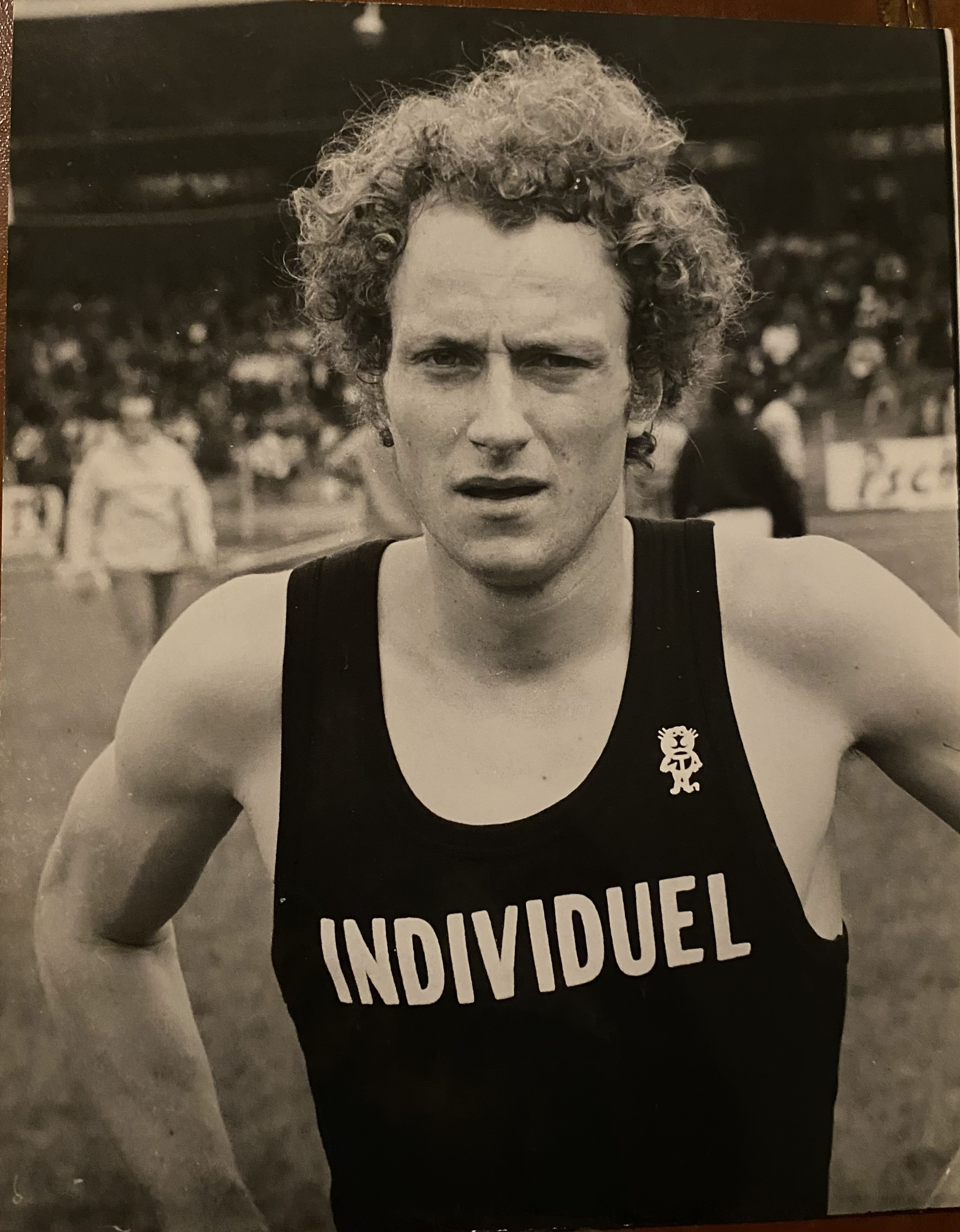
- Marcel Philippe (1973)

Personal information
- Nationality: French
- Born: 16 September 1951 (age 74) New York City, United States
- Height: 178 cm (5 ft 10 in)
- Weight: 68 kg (150 lb)

Sport
- Country: France
- Sport: Track
- Events: 800 meters, 1000 meters, 1500 meters, mile
- Club: Stade Français

Achievements and titles
- Personal bests: 800m: 1:45.79 (Nice, 1973) 1000m: 2:17.0h (Paris, 1973) 1500m: 3:37.90 (Stockholm, 1974) 4x1500m relay: 14:48.2h (NR) (Bourges, 1979)
Medal record
French Athletics Championships
| Gold medal – first place | 1973 Colombes | 800 m |
| Gold medal – first place | 1974 Nice | 800 m |
Summer Universiade
| Silver medal – second place | 1973 Moscow | 800 m |

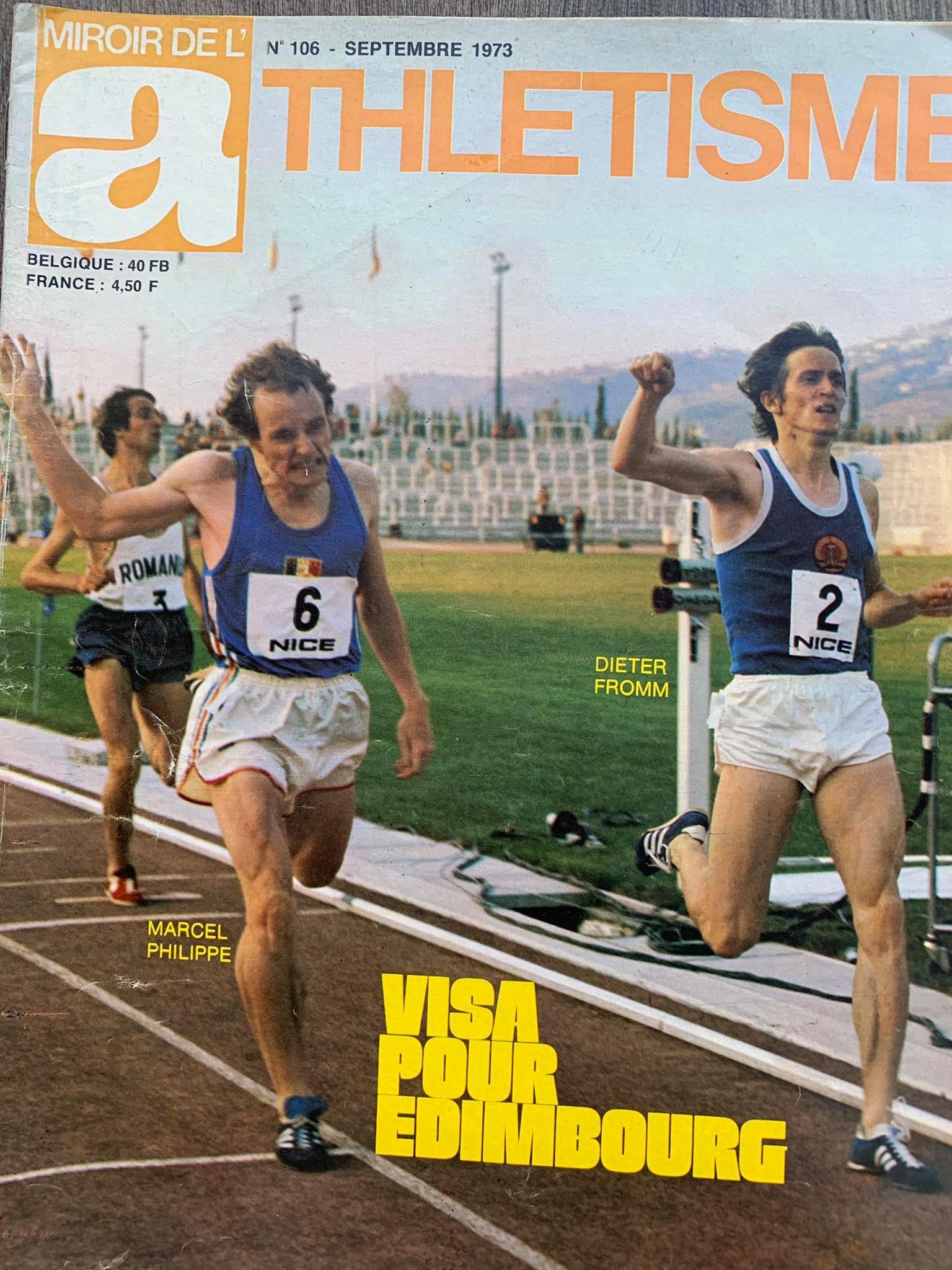
Marcel Philippe crosses the line in the 800m semifinal of the 1973 European Cup

Marcel Philippe (born 16 September 1951) is a French middle-distance runner. Born in New York City to a French father, he attended Mater Christi High School, where he set the still-standing New York State Record in the 880 yds. While attending Fordham University, he was the 1973 NCAA Indoor Track and Field Champion. He still holds the Fordham record for indoor mile, 1000 yards, and outdoor 800m. At the 1976 Summer Olympics he competed in the men's 800 metres. Philippe set multiple French records in the 800m, 1000m, and 4x1500m relay distances. He won both the 1973 and 1974 French Athletics Championships in the 800m.

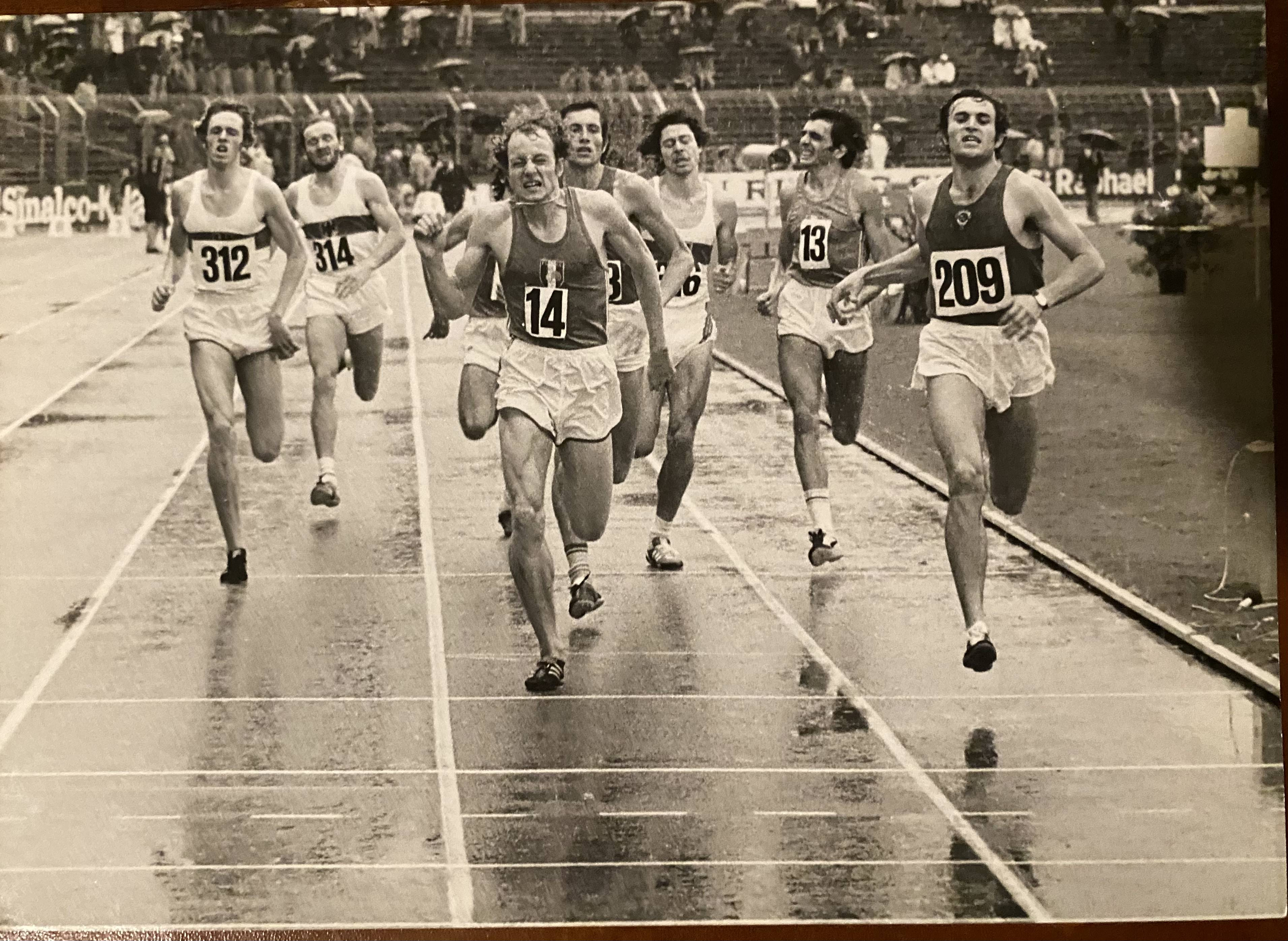
Marcel Philippe (middle) (1974)

Philippe participated in the 1973 European Cup, placing second to Dieter Fromm in the semi-final despite improving his French 800m record with a time of 1:45.79. He won a silver medal at the World University Games in Moscow, narrowly losing to Yevgeniy Arzhanov, the Munich 1972 Olympic silver medalist. That same year he beat Arzhanov to the line in the U.S. 1973 Indoor Track and Field Championships, placing first in the 1000 yds with a time of 2:08.8.

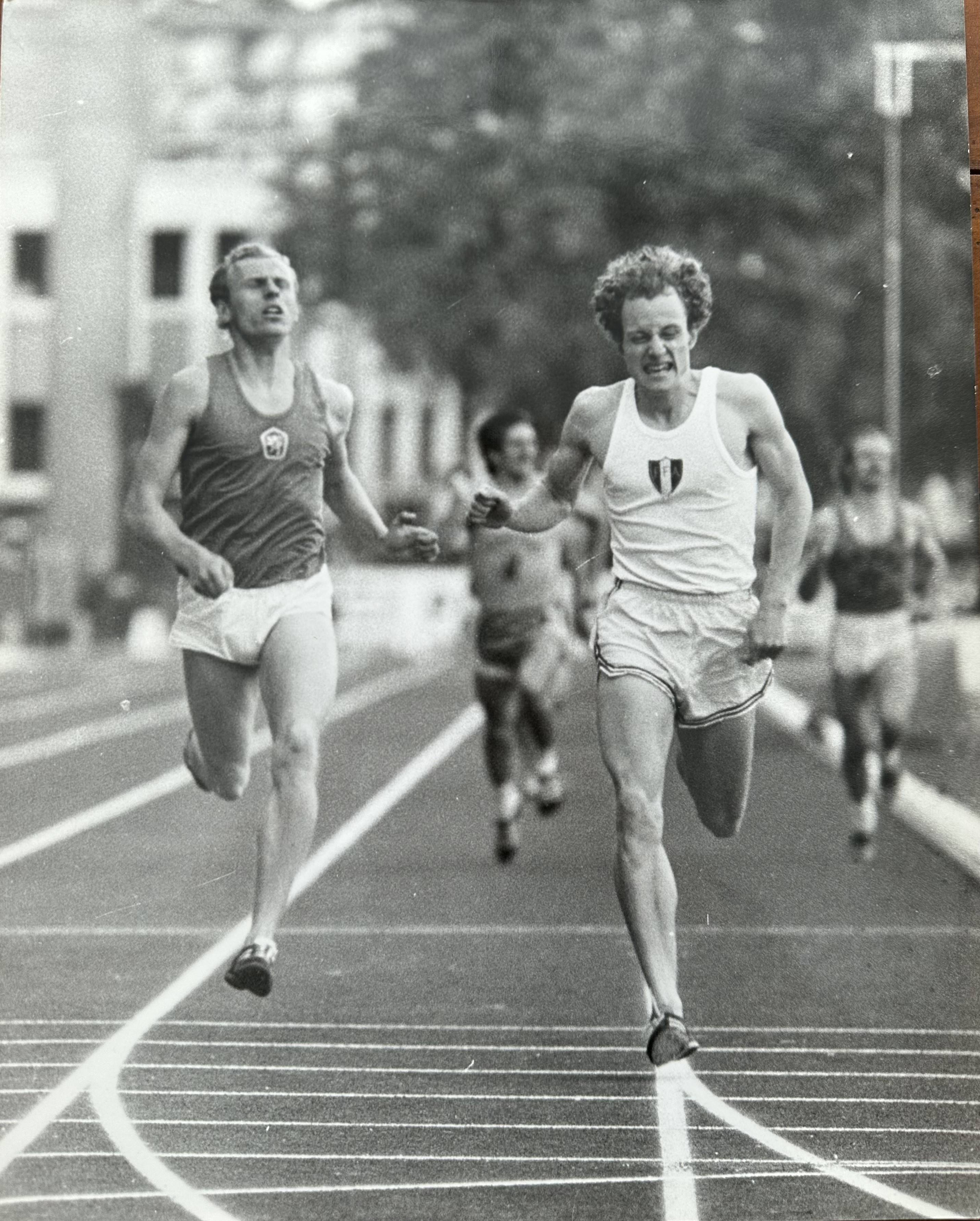
Marcel Philippe (right) competing for France in 1973
