= Ivan Kováč =

Slovak middle-distance runner (1948–2023)

Personal information
- Nationality: Slovak
- Born: 25 December 1948 Zemianske Kostoľany, Czechoslovakia
- Died: 11 February 2023 (aged 74)

Sport
- Sport: Middle-distance running
- Event: 1,500 metres
Medal record
Men's athletics
Representing Czechoslovakia
European Indoor Championships
Silver medal – second place	1973 Rotterdam	4×680 m

Ivan Kováč (25 December 1948 – 11 February 2023) was a Slovak middle-distance runner, specializing in 1,500 meters run, and sports journalist.

== Biography ==
Kováč was born in Zemianske Kostoľany on 25 December 1948. He originally started competing in athletics in Banská Štiavnica before moving to Dukla Banská Bystrica.

Following his retirement, Kováč became a well-known radio sports commentator, covering football and ice hockey in addition to athletics.

== Achievements ==
Kováč was a part of the winning team in the relay 4 x 4 laps at the 1973 European Athletics Indoor Championships in Rotterdam. He also competed at the European Athletics Indoor Championships in 1970 in Vienna, 1971 in Sofia and 1974 in Rome as well as the 1973 Summer Universiade in Moscow.

On 30 May 1974, Kováč achieved the time of 3:39.4 in 1,500 meter run at an event in Bratislava, which is as of February 2023 still a national record in Slovakia.
