= Markku Taskinen =

Finnish former athlete (born 1952)

Personal information
- Born: 25 February 1952 (age 74) Kuusamo, Finland
- Height: 185 cm (6 ft 1 in)
- Weight: 66 kg (146 lb)

Sport
- Sport: Athletics
- Club: Viipurin Urheilijat

Achievements and titles
- Personal best(s): 400 m: 47.12 (1975); 800 m:1:45.89 (1974); 400 m hurdles: 51.92 (1979)
Medal record
Men's athletics
Representing Finland
European Championships
Bronze medal – third place	1974 Rome	800 m
Bronze medal – third place	1974 Rome	4×400 m
European Indoor Championships
Gold medal – first place	1978 Milan	800 m

Markku Aulis Taskinen (born 25 February 1952) is a Finnish former athlete. At the 1974 European Championships he won bronze medals in both the 800 metres and the 4 × 400 metres relay. He was European indoor champion at 800 metres in 1978.

== Career ==
Taskinen was Finnish national under-19 champion at 800 m in 1970 and national under-21 champion at both 400 m and 800 m in 1971. He won his first national senior titles in 1973, winning both 400 m (47.9) and 800 m (1:50.0) at the Finnish championships. He repeated as 800 m champion in 1974, but was not expected to even make the final at that year's European Championships in Rome.

At the European championships he placed third in his heat (1:48.7) and fourth in his semi-final (1:47.7); he was the last athlete to qualify for the final. In the final he was in last place with less than 100 m to go, but passed five athletes on the final straight and won bronze behind Luciano Sušanj and Steve Ovett; his time of 1:45.89 improved his personal best by more than a second and a half. He won a second medal in the 4 × 400 m relay, running the third leg for the Finnish team; Finland was disqualified for shoving after a French protest, but filed a successful counter-protest and regained the medal.

Taskinen won further Finnish 800 m titles in 1975, 1976 and 1978; counting indoor titles (one each at 400 m and 800 m) and relay titles (one at 4 × 400 m and two at 4 × 800 m), he is an 11-time Finnish champion. At the 1978 European Indoor Championships in Milan he won gold in the 800 metres, ahead of East Germany's Olaf Beyer; as of 2014, his winning time of 1:47.36 still remains the Finnish indoor record, though Wilson Kirwa and Ari Suhonen have run faster on oversized tracks. At the 1978 European outdoor championships in Prague Taskinen again took part in the 800 metres, but was eliminated in the semi-finals.

In 1979 Taskinen experimented with the 400 m hurdles, representing Finland in that event at the Finland-Sweden Athletics International and winning silver in it at the national championships.
