= 1970 European Athletics Indoor Championships – Men's 800 metres =

The men's 800 metres event at the 1970 European Athletics Indoor Championships was held on 14 and 15 March in Vienna.

== Medalists ==
Gold	Silver	Bronze
Yevgeniy Arzhanov; Soviet Union	Juan Borraz; Spain	Jože Međimurec; Yugoslavia

== Results ==
=== Heats ===
First 3 in each heat (Q) and the next 2 fastest (q) qualified for the final.

Rank	Heat	Name	Nationality	Time	Notes
1	1	Yevgeniy Arzhanov	Soviet Union	1:50.1	Q
2	1	Franz-Josef Kemper	West Germany	1:50.4	Q
3	1	Andrzej Kupczyk	Poland	1:50.5	Q
4	1	Noel Carroll	Ireland	1:50.6	q
5	1	Jože Međimurec	Yugoslavia	1:51.3	q
6	1	Dimko Deribeyev	Bulgaria	1:51.8	
1	2	Colin Campbell	Great Britain	1:51.7	Q
2	2	Juan Borraz	Spain	1:51.8	Q
3	2	Sergey Kryuchok	Soviet Union	1:51.9	Q
4	2	Ján Šišovský	Czechoslovakia	1:52.0	
5	2	Nils-Erik Emilsson	Sweden	1:52.6	
6	2	Gilbert Van Manshoven	Belgium	1:53.1	

=== Final ===
Rank	Name	Nationality	Time	Notes
1st place, gold medalist(s)	Yevgeniy Arzhanov	Soviet Union	1:51.0	
2nd place, silver medalist(s)	Juan Borraz	Spain	1:51.9	
3rd place, bronze medalist(s)	Jože Međimurec	Yugoslavia	1:51.9	
4	Franz-Josef Kemper	West Germany	1:51.9	
5	Andrzej Kupczyk	Poland	1:52.0	
6	Colin Campbell	Great Britain	1:52.0	
7	Noel Carroll	Ireland	1:52.1	
8	Sergey Kryuchok	Soviet Union	1:54.0	
