= Alain Sans =

French middle-distance runner

Personal information
- Nationality: French
- Born: 20 March 1945 (age 81)

Sport
- Sport: Middle-distance running
- Event: 800 metres
- Club: US Fronton athlétisme

Alain Sans (born 20 March 1945) is a French middle-distance runner. He competed in the men's 800 metres at the 1972 Summer Olympics.
