= Fritz Pierre =

Haitian middle-distance runner

Personal information
- Nationality: Haitian
- Born: 2 April 1949 (age 77)

Sport
- Sport: Middle-distance running
- Event: 800 metres

Fritz Pierre (born 2 April 1949) is a Haitian middle-distance runner. He competed in the men's 800 metres at the 1972 Summer Olympics.
