= Vladimir Ponomaryov (runner) =

Medal record

Men's athletics

Representing the Soviet Union

IAAF World Cup
Silver medal – second place	1979 Montreal	1500 m

European Indoor Championships
Bronze medal – third place	1975 Katowice	800 m

Vladimir Ponomaryov (Russian: Владимир Иванович Пономарёв; born 10 August 1952) is a Russian former Soviet middle-distance runner. He represented his country at the 1976 Summer Olympics and was a seven-time Soviet national champion, four times outdoors.

Born in Razvilnoye in Rostov Oblast, he was a member of the Rostov-on-Don athletic club during his career. He came to national prominence with a 1000 metres win at the 1973 Soviet Indoor Athletics Championships. He went on to compete at the 1974 European Athletics Championships, where he narrowly missed a medal in fourth behind Finland's Markku Taskinen.

International success came in 1975 with bronze medals at the 1975 European Athletics Indoor Championships and the 1975 European Cup. He also reached the pinnacle of the sport at national level with an 800 m win at the 1975 Soviet Spartakiad. After a third-place finish over 800 metres at the Soviet Athletics Championships, he was selected to represent the Soviet Union at the 1976 Summer Olympics. He competed in the 800 m and 4 × 400 metres relay heats only.

Ponomaryov was dominant nationally in 1977, taking the 800 m indoor title and an 800/1500 metres double at the Soviet Championships. He was absent in the 1978 season but returned the following year to win his last national titles over 1500 m at the Soviet Indoor Championships and Spartakiad. In his last major international outing, he took his highest honour – a 1500 m silver medal at the 1979 IAAF World Cup behind West Germany's Thomas Wessinghage. He set a lifetime best of 3:37.9 minutes for the event that same year.

== Personal bests ==
- 800 metres – 1:45.6 min (1976)
- 1000 metres – 2:17.5 min (1978)
- 1500 metres – 3:37.9 min (1979)
- 3000 metres – 7:52.1 min (1980)

All details from All-Athletics

== International competitions ==
Year	Competition	Venue	Position	Event	Notes
1974	European Championships	Rome, Italy	4th	800 m	1:46.02
1975	European Indoor Championships	Katowice, Poland	3rd	800 m	1:50.2
1975	European Cup	Nice, France	3rd	800 m	1:47.64
1976	Olympic Games	Montreal, Canada	3rd (heats)	800 m	1:48.59
1976	Olympic Games	Montreal, Canada	6th (heats)	4 × 400 m relay	3:07.72
1979	IAAF World Cup	Montreal, Canada	2nd	1500 m	3:46.13

== National titles ==
- Soviet Athletics Championships
  - 800 m: 1975, 1977
  - 1500 m: 1977, 1979
- Soviet Indoor Athletics Championships
  - 800 m: 1977
  - 1000 m: 1973
  - 1500 m: 1979

== Notes ==
- The athlete's name is also transliterated as Ponomaryev and Ponomarov.
