= Francis Gonzalez =

French runner

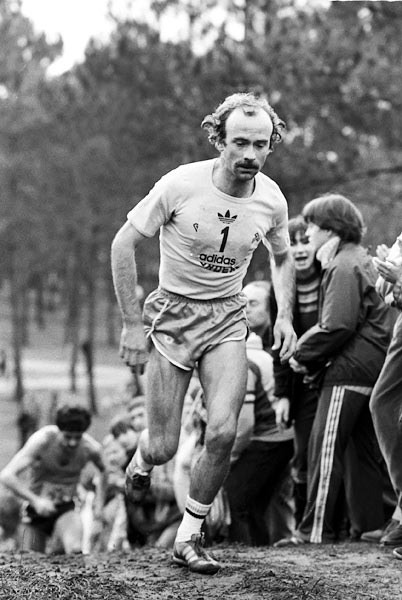

Personal information
- Born: 6 February 1952 (age 74) Bordeaux, France
- Height: 1.70 m (5 ft 7 in)
- Weight: 60 kg (132 lb)

Sport
- Sport: Athletics
- Events: 800 m, 1500 m, 3000 m
- Club: ASPTT Bordeaux
Medal record
Men's athletics
Representing France
European Indoor Championships
Gold medal – first place	1973 Rotterdam	800 m
Bronze medal – third place	1972 Grenoble	800 m

Francis Gonzalez (born 6 February 1952 in Bordeaux) is a retired French middle- and long-distance runner. He represented his country at the 1972 and 1976 Summer Olympics. In addition, he won medals at the 1972 and 1973 European Indoor Championships.

== International competitions ==
Year	Competition	Venue	Position	Event	Notes
Representing France
1970	European Junior Championships	Paris, France	12th (sf)	800 m	1:55.1
1972	European Indoor Championships	Grenoble, France	3rd	800 m	1:49.17
1972	Olympic Games	Munich, West Germany	25th (h)	800 m	1:48.8
1973	European Indoor Championships	Rotterdam, Netherlands	1st	800 m	1:49.17
1975	European Indoor Championships	Katowice, Poland	11th (h)	800 m	3:47.9
1976	European Indoor Championships	Munich, West Germany	6th	800 m	1:50.9
1976	Olympic Games	Montreal, Canada	12th (sf)	1500 m	3:40.73
1977	European Indoor Championships	San Sebastián, Spain	7th	1500 m	3:49.2
1978	European Indoor Championships	Milan, Italy	7th	1500 m	3:43.4
1978	European Championships	Prague, Czechoslovakia	10th	1500 m	3:40.1
1979	European Indoor Championships	Vienna, Austria	7th	3000 m	7:51.9
1981	European Indoor Championships	Grenoble, France	4th	3000 m	9:04.00
1982	European Championships	Athens, Greece	–	5000 m	DNF
1985	World Indoor Games	Paris, France	6th	3000 m	7:58.78

== Personal bests ==
Outdoor

- 800 metres – 1:47.1 (Colombes 1972)
- 1000 metres – 2:18.0 (Nice 1978)
- 1500 metres – 3:36.2 (Paris 1979)
- One mile – 3:53.02 (Lausanne 1981)
- 2000 metres – 4:58.1 (Rennes 1979)
- 3000 metres – 7:41.00 (Lausanne 1979)
- 5000 metres – 13:20.24 (Stockholm 1979)
- 10,000 metres – 28:26.04 (Paris 1984)
- Half marathon – 1:03:34 (Paris 1987)

Indoor

- 800 metres – 1:49.17 (Grenoble 1972)
- 1500 metres – 3:39.3 (Dortmund 1978)
- 3000 metres – 7:51.9 (Vienna 1979)
