= Benson Mulomba =

Zambian middle-distance runner

Personal information
- Nationality: Zambian
- Born: 15 December 1949 (age 76)

Sport
- Sport: Middle-distance running
- Event: 800 metres

Benson Mulomba (born 15 December 1949) is a Zambian middle-distance runner. He competed in the men's 800 metres at the 1972 Summer Olympics.
