= 1973 European Athletics Indoor Championships – Men's 4 × 680 metres relay =

The men's 4 × 680 metres relay event at the 1973 European Athletics Indoor Championships was held on 11 March in Rotterdam. Each athlete ran four laps of the 170 metres track.

== Results ==
Rank	Nation	Competitors	Time	Notes
1st place, gold medalist(s)	West Germany	Reinhold Soyka; Josef Schmid; Thomas Wessinghage; Paul-Heinz Wellmann	6:21.58	
2nd place, silver medalist(s)	Czechoslovakia	Ivan Kováč; Jozef Samborský; Jozef Plachý; Ján Šišovský	6:21.60	
3rd place, bronze medalist(s)	Poland	Krzysztof Linkowski; Lesław Zając; Czesław Jursza; Henryk Sapko	6:26.95	
4	Netherlands	Wijnand Bladt; Wim Braaksma; Martin Moser; Jan Reynders	6:29.99	
