= Luciano Sušanj =

Croatian politician and Olympic runner athlete (1948–2024)

Personal information
- Nationality: Yugoslav; Croatian
- Born: 10 November 1948 Rijeka, PR Croatia, FPR Yugoslavia
- Died: 14 April 2024 (aged 75) Rijeka, Croatia
- Height: 6 ft 1 in (1.85 m)
- Weight: 161 lb (73 kg)

Sport
- Sport: Track
- Event(s): 400 metres 800 metres
- Club: AK Kvarner
- Retired: 1976

Achievements and titles
- Personal best(s): 400m: 45.93; 800m: 1:44.07; 1000m: 2:19.09
Medal record
Men's athletics
Representing Yugoslavia
European Championships
| Gold medal – first place | 1974 Rome | 800 m |
European Indoor Championships
| Gold medal – first place | 1973 Rotterdam | 400 m |
| Gold medal – first place | 1974 Gothenburg | 800 m |

Luciano Sušanj (10 November 1948 – 14 April 2024) was a Croatian politician, sports worker and track athlete who competed for Yugoslavia. Sušanj was successful in international competition over 400 and 800 meters, but was best known for winning the 800 meters European title in 1974.

In the 1990s Sušanj started a political career, winning a seat in the Croatian Parliament in 1990 and 2000. In 2000 he was elected president of the Croatian Athletics Federation, and vice-president of the Croatian Olympic Committee.

== Athletic career ==
Luciano Sušanj started athletics as a junior competitor for AK Kvarner in Rijeka, his native city. In 1966 and 1967 Sušanj won a total of five medals with his club, competing over 100 meters, 400 meters, 4 × 100 meters and 400 meter hurdles in the national junior competition. In 1969 he became a Yugoslav champion over 400 meters and won the gold medal in the same event at the Balkan Games.

In the early 1970s Sušanj shifted his focus from 400 meters towards 800 meters. His 800 meters breakthrough year was 1973, when he won the Yugoslav championship and the gold medal at the Balkan Games, repeating his 1969 success over 400 meters. His coach was Željko Leskovac. In the same year, Sušanj also became the 400 meters European indoor champion, winning the final on 11 March with 46.38 s, an indoor world record at the time.

In his most famous race, the 800 meters final at the 1974 European Championships in Athletics in Rome, Sušanj used his speed to outsprint the opposition in the last 200 meters, and won the race by more than a second-and-a-half, beating a home crowd favorite and the reigning world record holder Marcello Fiasconaro, as well as the then-18-year-old Steve Ovett.

After his surprise victory in Rome, Sušanj disappeared from the athletics scene. By that time, he was already married and a father of two, and quickly realized he would be unable to prepare for the 1976 Summer Olympics while working at the same time. Between athletics and supporting his family, Sušanj chose the latter. Eventually, he did compete at the Montreal Olympics, where he placed sixth in the 800 m final, clocking 1:45.75. By his account, Sušanj was not in optimal form in Montreal because he was serving the army that year. A month after the Olympics he retired from the sport, pursuing a physical education diploma.

Until Blanka Vlašić's high jump world title in 2007, Sušanj's 800 meters gold medal at the 1974 European Championships in Athletics was widely seen as the greatest individual achievement in the history of Croatian athletics. As of 2018, his winning mark of 1:44.07 still stands as the Croatian record.

In 2002, the Croatian Athletics Federation named Sušanj the all-time best Croatian male track and field athlete.

== Political career ==
Until 1990, the year he entered politics, Sušanj was employed as a sports worker in Rijeka. In the first democratic election in Croatia, he obtained a seat in the Croatian Parliament and served as an MP until 1992. In the 1990s, he served as deputy-mayor of Rijeka and president of the Alliance of Primorje-Gorski Kotar, a regional party active in the Primorje-Gorski Kotar County.

In 2000 Sušanj was again elected to the Croatian Parliament, and became president of the Croatian Athletics Federation and vice-president of the Croatian Olympic Committee. In 2002 he ran for the president of the Croatian Olympic Committee, but lost to Zlatko Mateša. In 2003, Sušanj left the Alliance of Primorje-Gorski Kotar over disagreements with its president Nikola Ivaniš, and entered the newly formed Autonomous Regional Party (Croatian: Autonomna regionalna stranka), of which he was a co-founder.

== Death ==
Luciano Sušanj died in Rijeka on 14 April 2024. He was 75.
