= Yevhen Volkov =

Personal information
- Nationality: Soviet
- Born: 25 May 1948 (age 78)

Sport
- Sport: Middle-distance running
- Event: 800 metres

Yevhen Volkov (born 25 May 1948) is a Soviet middle-distance runner. He competed in the men's 800 metres at the 1972 Summer Olympics.
