= Reinhold Soyka =

German middle-distance runner

Medal record

Men's athletics

Representing West Germany

European Indoor Championships
Gold medal – first place	1973 Rotterdam	4×680 m

Reinhold Soyka (born 22 March 1952) is a retired West German middle distance runner, who specialized in the 800 metres.

== Competition Results ==
At the 1973 European Indoor Championships he won a silver medal in the 4 × 720 metres relay, together with Josef Schmid, Thomas Wessinghage and Paul-Heinz Wellmann.

He finished sixth in the individual distance at the 1975 European Indoor Championships.

He became West German indoor champion in 1975.

== Club Team ==
In domestic competitions, he represented the sports club LC Bonn.
