= Zemianske Kostoľany =

- Municipality
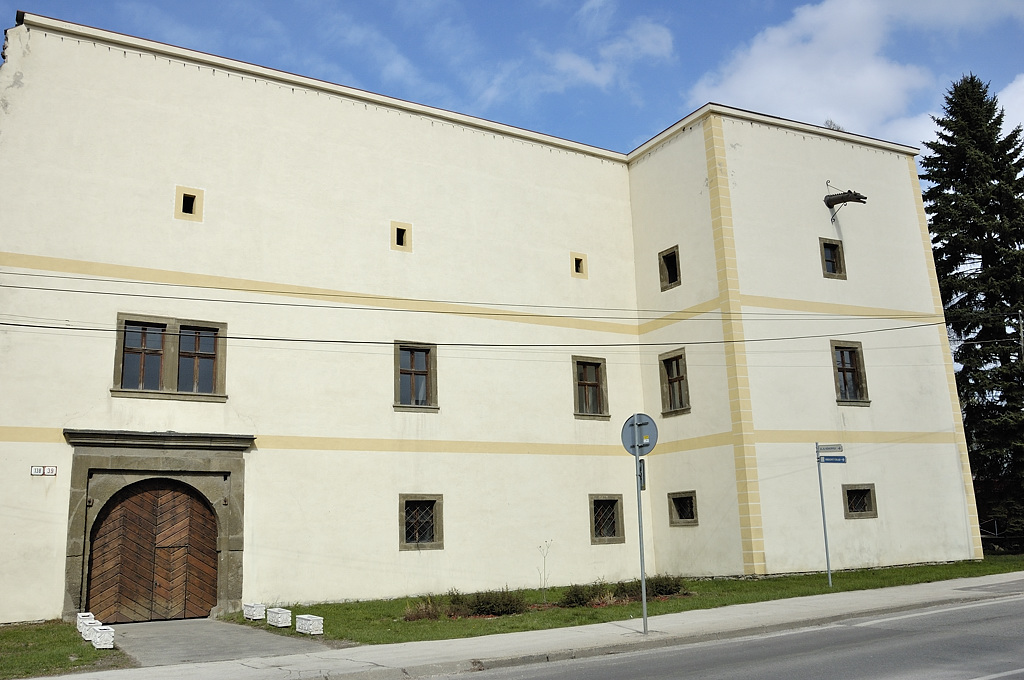
- Manor house in Zemianske Kostoľany

- Flag

- Location of Zemianske Kostoľany in the Trenčín Region Location of Zemianske Kostoľany in Slovakia
- Coordinates: 48.68°N 18.53°E
- Country: Slovakia
- Region: Trenčín Region
- District: Prievidza District
- First mentioned: 1331

Area
  - Total: 12.74 km^{2} (4.92 sq mi)
- Elevation: 232 m (761 ft)

Population (2025)
  - Total: 1,718
- Time zone: UTC+1 (CET)
  - Summer (DST): UTC+2 (CEST)
- Postal code: 972 43
- Area code: +421 46
- Vehicle registration plate (until 2022): PD
- Website: www.zemianskekostolany.sk

Zemianske Kostoľany (Hungarian: Nemeskosztolány) is a village and municipality in Prievidza District in the Trenčín Region of western Slovakia.

== History ==
In historical records the village was first mentioned in 1331.

== Geography ==
The municipality lies at an altitude of 232 metres (761 ft) and covers an area of 12.74 km^{2} (4.92 sq mi) (2025).

== Population ==
Population statistic (10 years)
Year	1995	2005	2015	2025
Count	1628	1670	1731	1718
Difference		+2.57%	+3.65%	−0.75%

Population statistic
Year	2024	2025
Count	1699	1718
Difference		+1.11%

It has a population of 1718 people (31 December 2025).

=== Ethnicity ===
Census 2021 (1+ %)
Ethnicity	Number	Fraction
Slovak	1670	96.36%
Not found out	49	2.82%
Total	1733	

In year 2021 was 1733 people by ethnicity 1670 as Slovak, 49 as Not found out, 12 as Other, 9 as Czech, 6 as Hungarian, 4 as Italian, 3 as Russian, 3 as Moravian, 2 as Ukrainian, 2 as Rusyn, 1 as Irish, 1 as Serbian, 1 as Silesian, 1 as Romani, 1 as Polish, 1 as German, 1 as Canadian and 1 as Albanian.

Note on population: The difference values of population numbers in the table "Population statistic" and in the sections "Ethnicity" & "Religion" is caused by the use of various statistical methods.

=== Religion ===
Census 2021 (1+ %)
Religion	Number	Fraction
Roman Catholic Church	1086	62.67%
None	505	29.14%
Not found out	44	2.54%
Christian Congregations in Slovakia	30	1.73%
Evangelical Church	28	1.62%
Total	1733	

In year 2021 was 1733 people by religion 1086 from Roman Catholic Church, 505 from None, 44 from Not found out, 30 from Christian Congregations in Slovakia, 28 from Evangelical Church, 8 from Greek Catholic Church, 7 from Other, 5 from Paganism and natural spirituality, 4 from Eastern Orthodox Church, 3 from Other and not ascertained christian church, 3 from Ad hoc movements, 2 from Jewish community, 2 from Jehovah's Witnesses, 2 from Buddhism, 1 from Old Catholic Church, 1 from Islam, 1 from United Methodist Church and 1 from Baptists Church.

== Environment ==
Zemianske Kostoľany is the location of the Nováky Power Plant lignite fired power station. This power station was ranked by the European Environment Agency as the industrial facility that is causing the highest damage costs to health and the environment in Slovakia and the 18th worst in the entire European Union.
