= Croatian Athletics Federation =

Governing body of athletics in Croatia

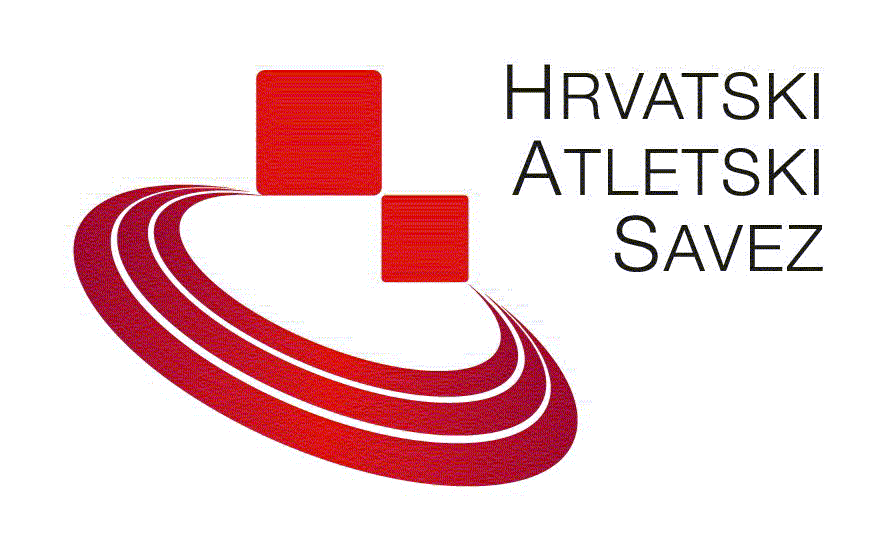
- Sport: Athletics
- Abbreviation: HAS
- Founded: 1992
- Affiliation: World Athletics
- Regional affiliation: European Athletic Association
- Affiliation date: 1992
- President: Ivan Veštić
- CEO: Mladen Katalinić
- Secretary: Mihaela Majurec
- Replaced: Yugoslavian Athletics Federation

Official website
- www.has.hr
- (Croatia)

The Croatian Athletics Federation (Croatian: Hrvatski atletski savez) is the governing body for the sport of athletics in Croatia.

It was founded in 1992 after Croatia had announced independence from the Socialist Federal Republic of Yugoslavia.

== Medalists at Olympic Games ==
#	Athlete	Gold	Silver	Bronze	Total
1	Sandra Perković	2	0	1	3
2	Blanka Vlašić	0	1	1	2
3	Sara Kolak	1	0	0	1

== Medalists at World Championship ==
#	Athlete	Gold	Silver	Bronze	Total
1	Blanka Vlašić	2	2	0	4
2	Sandra Perković	2	2	1	5
3	Stipe Žunić	0	0	1	1

== Medalists at European Championship ==
#	Athlete	Gold	Silver	Bronze	Total
1	Sandra Perković	7	0	0	7
2	Filip Mihaljević	1	1	0	2
3	Blanka Vlašić	1	0	0	1
3	Siniša Ergotić	0	1	0	1
4	Ana Šimić	0	0	1	1
4	Branko Zorko	0	0	1	1
4	Sara Kolak	0	0	1	1

== Medalists at World Indoor Championship ==
#	Athlete	Gold	Silver	Bronze	Total
1	Blanka Vlašić	2	1	1	4
2	Branko Zorko	0	0	1	1
2	Filip Mihaljević	0	0	1	1

== Medalists at European Indoor Championship ==
#	Athlete	Gold	Silver	Bronze	Total
1	Branko Zorko	0	1	1	2
2	Filip Mihaljević	0	0	1	1

== World Athletics annual series of competitions Winners ==
=== Diamond League ===
Field disciplines

- Sandra Perković - 6 times
- Blanka Vlašić - 2 times
