= Dave Wottle =

American track athlete (born 1950)

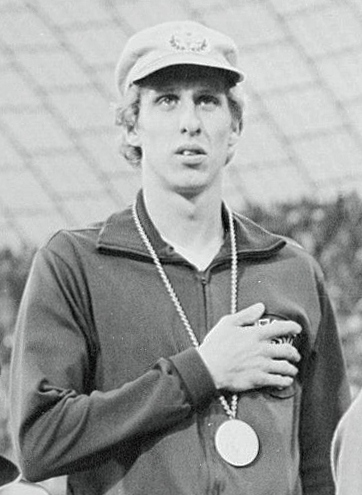
- Wottle at the 1972 Summer Olympics

Personal information
- Full name: David James Wottle
- Born: August 7, 1950 (age 76) Canton, Ohio, U.S.
- Height: 6 ft 0 in (1.83 m)
- Weight: 146 lb (66 kg)

Sport
- Sport: Track
- Events: 800 meters, 1500 meters, mile
- College team: Bowling Green

Achievements and titles
- Personal bests: 800m: 1:44.3 (Eugene 1972); 1500m: 3:36.2 (Helsinki 1973); Mile: 3:53.3 (Eugene 1973)
Medal record
Representing the United States
Olympic Games
Gold medal – first place	1972 Munich	800 m

David James Wottle (born August 7, 1950) is an American retired middle-distance track athlete. He was the gold medalist in the 800 meter run at the 1972 Summer Olympics in Munich and a world record holder in the 800 meters. In 1973, Wottle became the then-3rd fastest miler in history. He was known for wearing a golf cap while running.

== Early life ==
Dave Wottle was born in Canton, Ohio. During his childhood he was very slim and feeble. His family doctor told him that he needed to do something, such as running, to strengthen himself. The young boy took this advice and "ran with it".

== Running career ==
=== High school running ===
Wottle attended Lincoln High School in Canton, Ohio, graduating in 1968. Wottle was the 1968 Ohio State champion in the mile (4:20.2), after finishing 4th (4:22.4) in 1967. His best time in the 880 yard run in high school was 1:59.3.

=== Collegiate running ===
In his freshman year at Bowling Green State University (BGSU), Wottle won both the mile (4:06.8) and 880 (1:54.9) in the Ohio Federation meet at Miami University in Oxford, Ohio. Both times were his personal bests.

During his sophomore year at Bowling Green, Wottle placed 30th in the NCAA Cross Country Championship at Van Cortlandt Park in New York City and fourth in the mile (4:06.5) at the NCAA National Indoor Track & Field Championship at Cobo Hall in Detroit. In June, Wottle broke the four-minute mile for the first time with a 3:59.0 clocking at the Central Collegiate Conference Championship at Indiana University. It was the first time a sub-four minute mile had been run on Indiana soil. Wottle went on to win the United States Track & Field Federation (USTFF) 880 title in record time (1:47.8). At the NCAA National Track & Field Championship in Des Moines, Iowa, Wottle placed second to Marty Liquori in the mile (3:59.9 to 4:00.1).

Wottle missed the entire indoor and outdoor track season in 1971 due to a series of injuries. His first injury was a stress fracture in his left fibula, then bursitis in his right knee, and then a mirror-image stress fracture in his right fibula. He was subsequently red-shirted and received another year of eligibility.

Fully recovered from his injuries, during the 1971 cross country season Wottle finished 12th (30:06) at the NCAA National Cross Country Championship, and placed seventh in the USTFF National Championship (30:36).

During the 1972 indoor season, Wottle placed third in the Wanamaker Mile at the Millrose Games in Madison Square Garden, first in the mile (4:03.7) at the USTFF National Championships and first in the 1500 meters (3:44.8) at the U.S. Olympic Invitational at Madison Square Garden. At the NCAA National Indoor Championship, Wottle won the 880 title and anchored (4:02.7) Bowling Green's distance medley team to the national title.

In the spring of 1972, Wottle won the Dream Mile (3:58.5) in the International Freedom Games. He placed first at the NCAA National Outdoor Championship in the 1,500 meter (3:39.7), breaking the meet record, and the following week ran second (3:58.2) to Jim Ryun (3:57.3) in the mile at the Vons Classic. At the National AAU Championship in Seattle, Wottle's coach Mel Brodt had him run the 800 meter to try to meet the qualifying time in the 800 for the Olympic Trials (1:47.5). Wottle won the AAU title in 1:47.3.

At the 1972 Olympic Trials held in Eugene, Oregon, at Hayward Field, Wottle ran the 800 meter as a speed workout prior to his primary event, the 1,500 meter. Surprisingly, he placed first and tied the world record (1:44.3) in the fastest composite 800 meter race in history. It was the first time six runners finished under 1:45.5 in an 800 meter race. Wottle also qualified for the 1,500 meter at the 1972 Summer Olympics in Munich by finishing second to Jim Ryun (3:41.4 to 3:42.3) in the finals.

=== 1972 Olympics ===
Six days after the Olympic Trials, Wottle got married, much to the annoyance of U.S. Olympic team coach Bill Bowerman. The day Wottle got married, Bowerman said disgustedly: "He's traded a gold medal for a wife." Wottle's bride, Jan, traveled with him to Munich and stayed outside of the Olympic Village. Shortly after his wedding, Wottle developed tendonitis in his left knee while training at Bowdoin College with the Olympic team. He was unable to train properly for the following two weeks and then had limited mileage prior to the Olympics.

In the 800 meter final at the Olympics, Wottle immediately dropped to the rear of the field, and stayed there for the first 500 meters, at which point he started to pass runner after runner up the final straightaway. He seized the lead at the very end of the race to beat pre-race favorite Yevhen Arzhanov of the Soviet Union by just 0.03 seconds. At the time, it was the closest finish in Olympic 800 meter history. The race gained Wottle the nickname of "The Head Waiter". (Another nickname was "Wottle the Throttle".) His winning performance was a triumphant tour de force of even-paced running. His 200 meter splits were 26.4, 27.1, 26.6 and 26.2. As a result of his performance in Munich, he was awarded the prestigious U.S. Olympic Spirit Award, given to the athlete who demonstrates the special spirit of Olympism, courage and achievement at the Olympic Games.

Stunned by his victory, Wottle forgot to remove his cap on the podium during the national anthem. Some interpreted this as a form of protest, but Wottle later apologized at the news conference following the medals ceremony.

Wottle also competed in the 1,500 meter run at the Munich Olympics but was eliminated in the semi-finals. Track & Field News ranked him first in their 1972 world rankings for 800 meters.

Wottle's signature cap was originally used for practical purposes. He sported long hair at the peak of his career, so the hat kept his hair out of his eyes. After realizing the cap was part of his identity, he wore it for the remainder of his career. The cap now resides in the National Track and Field Hall of Fame in the Fort Washington Avenue Armory in New York City.

=== Final collegiate year ===
Since he was red-shirted in 1971, Wottle had an indoor and outdoor season of eligibility left in 1973. He beat Kip Keino (both at 4:06.1) at the wire in the L.A. Sunkist meet and then beat Marty Liquori and Reggie McAfee for the Astrodome Federation Indoor Championship in the mile (4:00.3). At the 1973 NCAA National Indoor Championship, Wottle placed first in the mile (4:03.4) and sixth in the two mile (8:51.3).

At the NCAA National Outdoor Championship in Baton Rouge, Louisiana, Wottle won his second consecutive outdoor 1,500/mile title in a best-ever 3:57.1 for an NCAA meet record. It was only the second time in history that eight runners finished under four minutes in a mile race.

In June, Wottle earned a Bachelor of Science degree in History from Bowling Green State University and was commissioned a second lieutenant in the United States Air Force.

In the battle of the 880 and 800 world record holders, Wottle finished second to Rick Wohlhuter (1:45.8 to 1:46.2) at the AAU National Championship meet in Bakersfield, California. Four days later, Wottle and 1972 U.S. Olympic teammate Steve Prefontaine raced each other in the first Hayward Restoration Meet (which would become the Prefontaine Classic) in Eugene, Oregon. Wottle defeated Prefontaine on his home track, running 3:53.3 to become the third-fastest miler in history at the time. Prefontaine ran 3:54.6, tied for the ninth-fastest miler at the time with Marty Liquori. Only world record holder Jim Ryun (3:51.1) and 1968 Olympic 1,500 meter champion Kip Keino (3:53.1) had run the mile faster than Wottle. After the race, a fan attempted to run off with Wottle's signature golf cap, but he chased the thief outside the stadium and retrieved his cap.

In late June, Wottle traveled to Scandinavia with Prefontaine and Olympic silver medalist hurdler Ralph Mann to compete in several meets. In Helsinki, Wottle ran the 800 meters in 1:45.3 to edge out Munich Olympic 800 meter finalist Dieter Fromm of East Germany. The next day, Wottle ran 3:36.2 finishing second behind Filbert Bayi (3:34.6) in the fastest composite 1,500 meter race ever run at that time as the first 13 finishers ran under the four-minute mile equivalent. Track & Field News ranked Wottle fourth in their 1973 world rankings in the 1,500 meters and seventh in the 800 meters.

== Professional career in athletics ==
Following his collegiate career, Wottle turned professional in 1974, but retired from competitive running soon after that.

== Career after athletics ==
While running professional track, Wottle began his career in college admissions and coached cross country and track first at Walsh University in North Canton, Ohio (1975–1977), and then at Bethany College in Bethany, West Virginia (1977–1982), where he became the Dean of Admissions.

In August 1983, Wottle accepted the position of Dean of Admissions and Financial Aid at Rhodes College in Memphis, Tennessee, and remained there until his retirement in June 2012. Upon his retirement, he was named Dean of Admissions and Financial Aid Emeritus. Wottle then served as the interim Vice-President of Enrollment Management at Millsaps College in Jackson, Mississippi, for eight months and, from September 2013 to April 2014, he served as the interim Vice President for Enrollment at Ohio Wesleyan University in Delaware, Ohio.

== Awards and honors ==
- NCAA Post-Graduate Scholarship
- Runner-up to Bill Walton for the 1973 James E. Sullivan Award
- Bowling Green State University inducted Wottle into its Athletic Hall of Fame in 1978.
- Wottle was inducted into the National Track and Field Hall of Fame in 1982.
- In 1990, the Mid-American Conference inducted Wottle into their Hall of Fame.
- In 2016, Wottle was inducted by the Ohio High School State Athletic Association into their Circle of Champions.
- Wottle was a member of the second class (2023) of inductees into the Collegiate Athlete Hall of Fame.

Records
Preceded by (New Zealand) Peter Snell	Men's 800 metres World Record Holder equalled time of Peter Snell and Ralph Doubell; 1972-07-01 – 1973-06-27	Succeeded by (Italy) Marcello Fiasconaro
