= Peter Browne (athlete) =

British former athlete (born 1949)

Pete Browne
Personal information
- Nationality: British (English)
- Born: 3 February 1949 (age 77) Middlesex, England

Sport
- Sport: Athletics
- Event: middle-distance
- Club: Queen's Park Harriers

Peter Miles Browne (born 3 February 1949), is a male former athlete who competed for England.

== Biography ==
Browne finished third behind Dave Cropper in the 800 metresevent at the 1969 AAA Championships, then improved to runner-up behind Andy Carter at the 1970 AAA Championships before becoming the British 800 metres champion at the 1971 AAA Championships.

He represented England in the 800 metres, at the 1974 British Commonwealth Games in Christchurch, New Zealand. He won the Middlesex County 800 metres title twelve times and was British League Manager for the Thames Valley Harriers and a Southern, England and British Team Manager.
