= Josef Schmid (athlete) =

German middle-distance runner

Personal information
- Born: 15 February 1953 (age 73) Altshausen, West Germany

Sport
- Sport: Track and field
Medal record
Representing West Germany
European Indoor Championships
Gold medal – first place	1973 Rotterdam	4×680 m
Silver medal – second place	1976 Munich	800 m

Josef Schmid (born 15 February 1953) is a retired West German middle distance runner who specialized in the 800 metres.

He won a gold medal in 4 × 720 metres relay at the 1973 European Indoor Championships with teammates Reinhold Soyka, Thomas Wessinghage und Paul-Heinz Wellmann and the silver medal in 800 m at the 1976 European Indoor Championships. He also competed at the 1972 Summer Olympics and the 1974 European Championships without reaching the final.

He competed for the sports clubs LG Saulgau and Salamander Kornwestheim during his active career.
