= Gerhard Stolle =

Personal information
- Born: 11 November 1952 (age 73)

Sport
- Sport: Track and field
Medal record
Representing East Germany
European Indoor Championships
Gold medal – first place	1975 Katowice	800 m
Silver medal – second place	1973 Rotterdam	800 m

Gerhard Stolle (born 11 November 1952) is a retired East German middle distance runner who specialized in the 800 metres. His personal best time was 1.46.19 minutes, achieved at the European Championships in Rome.

== Achievements ==
Year	Tournament	Venue	Result	Extra
1973	European Indoor Championships	Rotterdam, Netherlands	2nd	800 m
1974	European Championships	Rome, Italy	5th	800 m
1975	European Indoor Championships	Katowice, Poland	1st	800 m
