= Andy Carter (athlete) =

British middle-distance runner

Personal information
- Nationality: British (English)
- Born: 29 January 1949 (age 77) Exeter, Devon, England
- Height: 183 cm (6 ft 0 in)
- Weight: 69 kg (152 lb)

Sport
- Sport: Athletics
- Event: Middle-distance running
- Club: Stretford AC
Medal record
Men's athletics
Representing England
Commonwealth Games
Silver medal – second place	1974 Christchurch	4x400m
Representing Great Britain
European Championships
Bronze medal – third place	1971 Helsinki	800 m

Andrew William Carter (born 29 January 1949) is a male British retired track and field athlete who competed at the 1972 Summer Olympics.

== Biography ==
Carter became the British 800 metres champion after winning the British AAA Championships title at the 1970 AAA Championships.

Carter won the bronze medal at the 1971 European Championships in Helsinki, Finland, in the men's 800 metres, behind Yevgeniy Arzhanov (Soviet Union) and Dieter Fromm (East Germany) in a time of 1:46.16.

Carter regained his AAA title at the 1972 AAA Championships before participating in the men's 800 metres at the 1972 Summer Olympics in Munich, West Germany. Carter finished sixth in a time of 1:46.55.

Carter recorded his fastest time of 1:45.12 in 1973, winning the AAA Championship for the third time at London's Crystal Palace. Carter won the European Cup in 1973 in Edinburgh, defeating the Olympic silver medalist Arzhanov in 1:46.44.

In 1974 he won a silver medal representing England in the 4×400 metre relay event, at the 1974 British Commonwealth Games in Christchurch, New Zealand. He finished fifth in the 800 metres in a time of 1:45.97.

He improved the British record for 800 metres on three occasions. His other personal bests included: 400 metres – 48.0; 1,000 metres – 2:18.5 (1974); 1 mile – 3:59.3 (1972).

The U.S. magazine Track & Field News' annual world rankings ranked Carter third at 800 metres in 1971. They ranked him eighth in 1972 and sixth in 1973.
