= Yevhen Arzhanov =

Ukrainian middle-distance runner

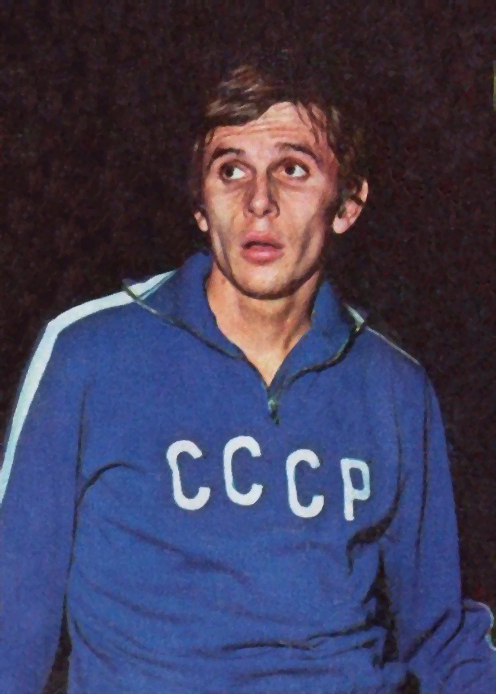

Personal information
- Born: 9 February 1948 (age 78) Kalush, Ukrainian Soviet Socialist Republic, Soviet Union
- Height: 1.79 m (5 ft 10 in)
- Weight: 68 kg (150 lb)

Sport
- Sport: Athletics
- Event: 800 m
- Club: Avanhard; Dynamo Kiev

Achievements and titles
- Personal best: 1:45.3 (1972)
Medal record
Men's athletics
Representing the Soviet Union
Olympic Games
Silver medal – second place	1972 Munich	800 m
European Championships
Gold medal – first place	1971 Helsinki	800 m
European Indoor Championships
Gold medal – first place	1970 Vienna	800 m
Gold medal – first place	1971 Sofia	800 m
Summer Universiade
Gold medal – first place	1973 Moscow	800 m

Yevhen Oleksandrovych Arzhanov (Ukrainian: Євген Олександрович Аржанов, born 9 February 1948) is a Ukrainian former middle-distance runner who won a silver medal in the 800 metres at the 1972 Summer Olympics.

Arzhanov was a keen basketball and football player, and took up athletics only in 1965, yet by 1968 he was selected for the Soviet national team. At the 1968 Olympics, he reached the semifinals, and next year finished fourth at the 1969 European Championships. He won gold medals at the 1970 European Indoor Championships with a time of 1:51.0, 1971 European Indoor Championships (1:48.7), 1971 European Championships (1:45.6) and 1973 Summer Universiade (1:46.9).

At the 1972 Olympics Arzhanov led the final, but was narrowly overtaken in the last meters by Dave Wottle, who finished in the same time (1:45.9).

After retiring from competitions, Arzhanov worked as athletics commentator with Ukrainian national television and radio stations. After the fall of the Soviet Union, he coached the national teams of South Korea and Vietnam.
