= Jože Međimurec =

Slovenian athlete

Personal information
- Nationality: Yugoslav
- Born: 6 August 1945 (age 80) Pince-Marof, Slovenia

Sport
- Sport: Middle-distance running
- Event: 800 metres
Medal record
Men's athletics
Representing Yugoslavia
European Indoor Championships
Bronze medal – third place	1970 Vienna	800 m

Jože Međimurec (born 6 August 1945) is a Slovenian and Yugoslav middle-distance runner. He competed in the men's 800 metres at the 1972 Summer Olympics.
