= András Zsinka =

Hungarian middle-distance runner (1947–2023)

Personal information
- Nationality: Hungarian
- Born: 19 October 1947 Székesfehérvár, Hungary
- Died: 8 April 2023 (aged 75)

Sport
- Sport: Middle-distance running
- Event: 800 metres
Medal record
Men's athletics
Representing Hungary
European Indoor Championships
Silver medal – second place	1974 Gothenburg	800 m

András Zsinka (19 October 1947 – 8 April 2023) was a Hungarian middle-distance runner. He competed in the men's 800 metres at the 1972 Summer Olympics.
