= Jozef Plachý =

Slovak runner (born 1949)

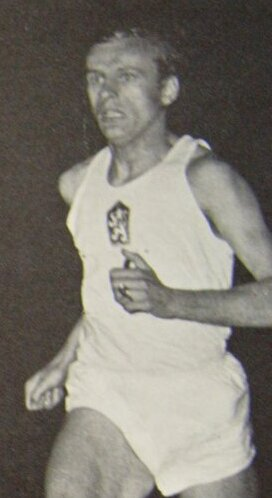
- Plachý in 1973 in Milan

Personal information
- Born: 13 December 1949 (age 76) Košice, Czechoslovakia
- Height: 1.82 m (6 ft 0 in)
- Weight: 73 kg (161 lb)

Sport
- Sport: Athletics
- Event(s): 800 m, 1500 m
- Club: Slávia Košice; HC Košice; Dukla Praha

Achievements and titles
- Personal best(s): 800 m – 1:45.4 (1969); 1500 m – 3:37.04 (1977)
Medal record
Men's athletics
Representing Czechoslovakia
European Championships
Silver medal – second place	1969 Athens	800 m
European Indoor Championships
Gold medal – first place	1972 Grenoble	800 m
Silver medal – second place	1973 Rotterdam	4×680 m
Bronze medal – third place	1973 Rotterdam	800 m
Bronze medal – third place	1974 Gottenburg	800 m
Summer Universiade
Gold medal – first place	1977 Sofia	1500 m

Jozef Plachý (born 28 February 1949) is a Slovak former middle-distance runner. He competed for Czechoslovakia at the 1968, 1972 and 1976 Summer Olympics in the 800 m and at the 1980 Olympics in the 1500 m event with the best result of fifth place in 1968. In 1969–1974 Plachý won four medals at European championships, indoors and outdoors. On 27 June 1973 he "helped" Marcello Fiasconaro, by chasing him through the race, to set an 800 m world record in Milan.
