= Sjef Hensgens =

Dutch middle-distance runner (1948–2024)

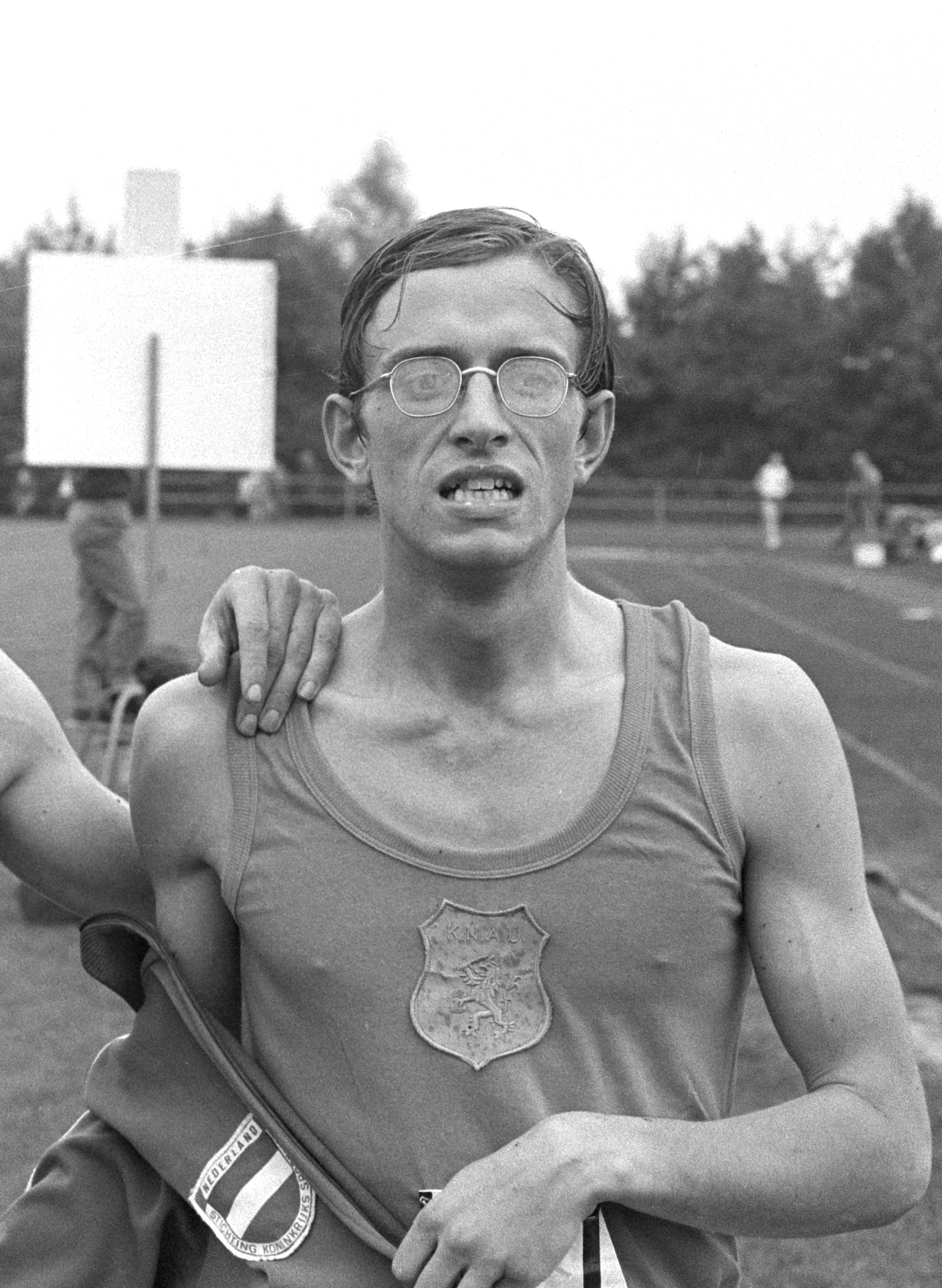
- Hensgens in 1970

Personal information
- Born: 27 January 1948 Wijlre, Netherlands
- Died: 19 May 2024 (aged 76)
- Height: 1.79 m (5 ft 10 in)
- Weight: 67 kg (148 lb)

Sport
- Sport: Middle-distance running
- Club: Achilles TOP, Kerkrade

Achievements and titles
- Olympic finals: 1972

Sjef Hensgens (27 January 1948 – 19 May 2024) was a Dutch middle-distance runner. He competed at the 1972 Summer Olympics in the 800 m event, but failed to reach the final, placing 4th in his heat with a time of 1:51,2. Hensgens died on 19 May 2024, at the age of 76.
