= Antonio Fernández (athlete) =

Spanish middle-distance runner

Personal information
- Born: 14 May 1948 (age 78) Abla, Spain

Sport
- Sport: Track and field

Antonio Fernández Ortiz (born 14 May 1948) is a former track and field athlete for Spain. He competed at the 1972 Olympics in the 800 meters event.

In 1976 he founded the athletics club Ajalkalá in Alcalá de Henares. Due to his career and his involvement in the sport of athletics in Alcalá, the local athletics track has been renamed after him. He is the father of Antonio Fernández Larragueta, technical director of the club as of 2025 and head coach of the club's sprints section.
