= Dieter Fromm =

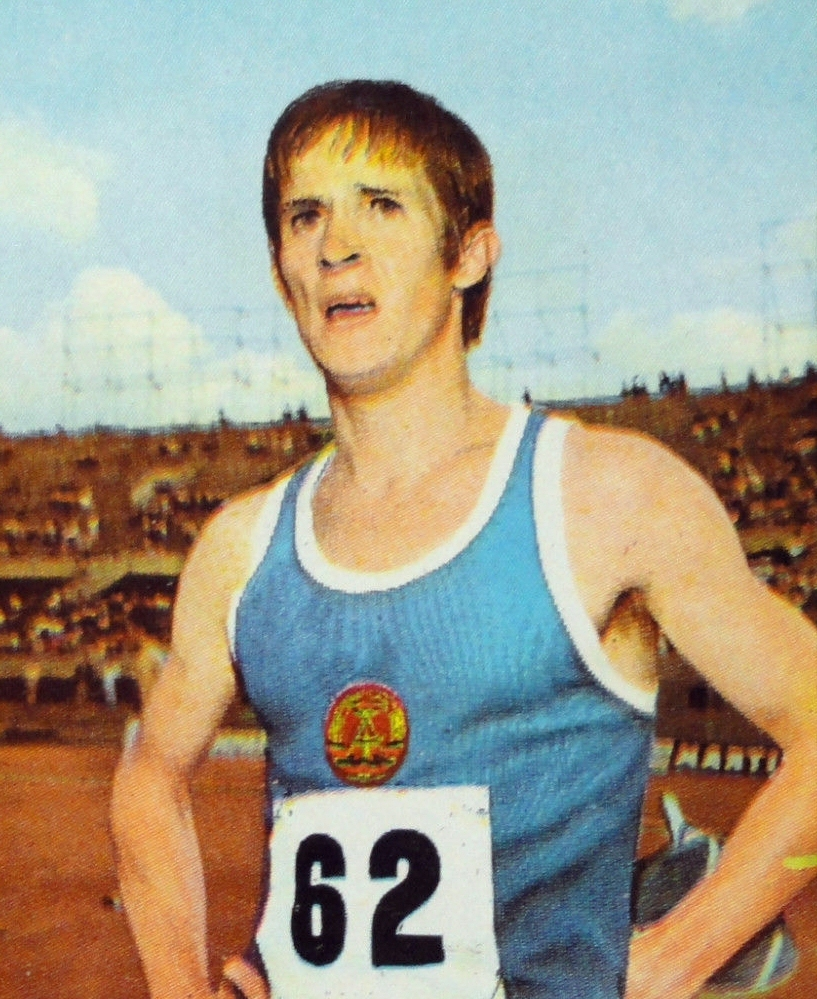

Personal information
- Born: 21 April 1948 (age 78) Bad Langensalza, Germany
- Height: 178 cm (5 ft 10 in)
- Weight: 65 kg (143 lb)

Sport
- Sport: Athletics
- Event: 800 m
- Club: SC Turbine Erfurt

Achievements and titles
- Personal best: 1:45.4 (1972)
Medal record
Men's athletics
Representing East Germany
European Championships
Gold medal – first place	1969 Athens	800 m
Silver medal – second place	1971 Helsinki	800 m

Dieter Fromm (born 21 April 1948) is a retired East German middle-distance runner who specialized in the 800 metres. He held the indoor 800 m world record for over ten years.

His career ended abruptly in 1976 when, in a race ahead of the 1976 Summer Olympics, for which Fromm was qualified, another runner tread on and damaged his achilles tendon.

He competed for the sports club SC Turbine Erfurt during his active career. His son Alexander married the Olympic sprinter Uta Rohländer.

== Achievements ==
Year	Tournament	Venue	Result	Extra
1966	European Junior Championships	Odessa, Soviet Union	2nd	
1968	Olympic Games	Mexico City, Mexico	6th	
1969	European Indoor Games	Belgrade, Yugoslavia	1st	1:46.6 CR
1969	European Championships	Athens, Greece	1st	
1971	European Championships	Helsinki, Finland	2nd	
1972	Olympic Games	Munich, West Germany	8th	
1974	European Championships	Rome, Italy	7th	
