= 1995 World Championships in Athletics – Men's 800 metres =

These are the official results of the Men's 800 metres event at the 1995 IAAF World Championships in Gothenburg, Sweden. There were a total number of 49 participating athletes, with two semi-finals, and seven qualifying heats and the final held on Tuesday August 8, 1995.

The final pared down to 8runners who believed in their kick. Vebjørn Rodal became the leader with Wilson Kipketer at the end of the field. Rodal led through an easy pace 52.53 through the first lap. With 200 to go, Nico Motchebon moved to the front, covered by Kipketer, but Rodal didn't relinquish the lead. Kipketer timed his big burst for 70 metres before the finish, Rodal had no answer but held off Motchebon, the rest of the field fading away. Coming from behind Motchebon, Arthémon Hatungimana was able to gradually gain on Rodall, passing him just a step before the finish.

== Medalists ==
Gold	Wilson Kipketer; Denmark (DEN)
Silver	Arthémon Hatungimana; Burundi (BDI)
Bronze	Vebjørn Rodal; Norway (NOR)

== Qualifying heats ==
- Held on Saturday 1995-08-05

Rank	Heat	Name	Nationality	Time	Notes
1	1	José Parrilla	United States	1:46.32	Q
2	1	Curtis Robb	Great Britain & N.I.	1:46.34	Q
3	1	Andrea Giocondi	Italy	1:46.44	q
4	1	Einārs Tupurītis	Latvia	1:46.45	
5	1	Marko Koers	Netherlands	1:46.73	
6	1	Jose Arconada	Spain	1:47.70	
7	1	Kayless Tavakalo	Vanuatu	1:58.06	
1	2	Philip Kibitok	Kenya	1:48.45	Q
2	2	Vebjørn Rodal	Norway	1:48.48	Q
3	2	Tomás de Teresa	Spain	1:49.07	
4	2	Jurgens Kotze	South Africa	1:49.40	
5	2	Brendan Hanigan	Australia	1:50.25	
6	2	Tommy Asinga	Suriname	1:51.60	
7	2	Michael Wildner	Austria	1:57.48	
1	3	Wilson Kipketer	Denmark	1:47.35	Q
2	3	Arthémon Hatungimana	Burundi	1:47.74	Q
3	3	Andrés Manuel Díaz	Spain	1:48.00	
4	3	David Strang	Great Britain & N.I.	1:48.76	
5	3	Babacar Niang	Senegal	1:49.74	
6	3	William Serem	Kenya	1:50.61	
—	3	Bekele Banbere	Ethiopia	DQ	
1	4	Hezekiél Sepeng	South Africa	1:46.33	Q
2	4	Atle Douglas	Norway	1:46.41	Q
3	4	Benyounés Lahlou	Morocco	1:46.72	
4	4	Giuseppe D'Urso	Italy	1:47.43	
5	4	Tomonari Ono	Japan	1:48.43	
6	4	Ivan Komar	Belarus	1:51.36	
7	4	Vanxay Sinebandith	Laos	2:00.25	
1	5	Mark Everett	United States	1:48.06	Q
2	5	Davide Cadoni	Italy	1:48.25	Q
3	5	Andrey Loginov	Russia	1:48.30	
4	5	Pavel Soukup	Czech Republic	1:48.32	
5	5	Savieri Ngidhi	Zimbabwe	1:48.77	
6	5	Jimmy Jean-Joseph	France	1:51.00	
—	5	Dhani Chaudhari	Nepal	DQ	
1	6	Brandon Rock	United States	1:46.83	Q
2	6	Mahjoub Haïda	Morocco	1:46.88	Q
3	6	José Luíz Barbosa	Brazil	1:47.10	
4	6	Frédéric Cornette	France	1:47.36	
5	6	Charles Nkazamyampi	Burundi	1:49.76	
6	6	Anwar Omar Mohammed	Yemen	1:58.20	
—	6	Julius Achon	Uganda	DNS	
1	7	Nico Motchebon	Germany	1:46.14	Q
2	7	Joseph Tengelei	Kenya	1:46.18	Q
3	7	Bruno Konczylo	France	1:46.44	q
4	7	David Matthews	Ireland	1:46.52	
5	7	Antonio Abrantes	Portugal	1:48.10	
6	7	Torbjörn Johansson	Sweden	1:48.31	
7	7	Mahmoud Al-Kheirat	Syria	1:48.76	

== Semi-finals ==
- Held on Sunday 1995-08-06

RANK	HEAT 1	TIME
1.	Wilson Kipketer (DEN)	1:48.39
2.	José Parrilla (USA)	1:49.43
3.	Andrea Giocondi (ITA)	1:49.45
4.	Mark Everett (USA)	1:49.47
5.	Hezekiél Sepeng (RSA)	1:49.58
6.	Atle Douglas (NOR)	1:49.63
7.	Philip Kibitok (KEN)	1:49.87
8.	Curtis Robb (GBR)	1:50.12

RANK	HEAT 2	TIME
1.	Vebjørn Rodal (NOR)	1:47.69
2.	Nico Motchebon (GER)	1:47.96
3.	Arthémon Hatungimana (BDI)	1:48.02
4.	Brandon Rock (USA)	1:48.04
5.	Bruno Konczylo (FRA)	1:48.05
6.	Mahjoub Haïda (MAR)	1:48.21
7.	Joseph Tengelei (KEN)	1:48.71
8.	Davide Cadoni (ITA)	1:53.67

== Final ==
RANK	FINAL	TIME
	Wilson Kipketer (DEN)	1:45.08
	Arthémon Hatungimana (BDI)	1:45.64
	Vebjørn Rodal (NOR)	1:45.68
4.	Nico Motchebon (GER)	1:45.97
5.	Brandon Rock (USA)	1:46.42
6.	José Parrilla (USA)	1:46.44
7.	Andrea Giocondi (ITA)	1:47.78
8.	Mark Everett (USA)	1:53.12
