= 1992 World Junior Championships in Athletics – Men's 800 metres =

The men's 800 metres event at the 1992 World Junior Championships in Athletics was held in Seoul, South Korea, at Olympic Stadium on 16, 17 and 19 September.

== Medalists ==
Gold	Benson Koech; Kenya
Silver	Lee Jin-Il; South Korea
Bronze	Brendan Hanigan; Australia

== Results ==
=== Final ===
19 September

Rank	Name	Nationality	Time	Notes
1st place, gold medalist(s)	Benson Koech	Kenya	1:44.77	
2nd place, silver medalist(s)	Lee Jin-Il	South Korea	1:46.34	
3rd place, bronze medalist(s)	Brendan Hanigan	Australia	1:47.26	
4	Vénuste Niyongabo	Burundi	1:47.28	
5	Hezekiel Sepeng	South Africa	1:47.51	
6	Marius van Heerden	South Africa	1:48.71	
7	Igor Tolokonikov	Commonwealth of Independent States	1:49.62	
	Davide Cadoni	Italy	DQ	

=== Semifinals ===
17 September

==== Semifinal 1 ====
Rank	Name	Nationality	Time	Notes
1	Lee Jin-Il	South Korea	1:48.91	Q
2	Igor Tolokonikov	Commonwealth of Independent States	1:49.93	Q
3	Vincent Malakwen	Kenya	1:50.37	
4	Adam Duke	United Kingdom	1:50.75	
5	Farah Ibrahim Ali Ahmed	Qatar	1:52.25	
6	Ali Hakimi	Tunisia	1:52.50	
7	Philipp Zeuch	Germany	1:56.78	
8	Sasha Smiljanic	Canada	2:01.75	

==== Semifinal 2 ====
Rank	Name	Nationality	Time	Notes
1	Benson Koech	Kenya	1:47.57	Q
2	Vénuste Niyongabo	Burundi	1:47.96	Q
3	Brendan Hanigan	Australia	1:48.56	q
4	Marius van Heerden	South Africa	1:49.83	q
5	Hailu Zewde	Ethiopia	1:50.02	
6	Zsombor Filep	Romania	1:50.29	
7	Julio Fuentes	Cuba	1:50.40	
8	David Divad	France	1:50.64	

==== Semifinal 3 ====
Rank	Name	Nationality	Time	Notes
1	Davide Cadoni	Italy	1:51.04	Q
2	Hezekiel Sepeng	South Africa	1:51.12	Q
3	José Manuel Cerezo	Spain	1:51.23	
4	Michael Daniel	United States	1:52.16	
5	Duncan O'Neil	Jamaica	1:52.18	
6	Sören Schröder	Germany	1:52.69	
7	Kevin Richardson	Australia	1:55.36	
	Kim Soon-Hyung	South Korea	DNF	

=== Heats ===
16 September

==== Heat 1 ====
Rank	Name	Nationality	Time	Notes
1	Benson Koech	Kenya	1:48.46	Q
2	Hezekiel Sepeng	South Africa	1:50.86	Q
3	Adam Duke	United Kingdom	1:51.52	Q
4	Ali Hakimi	Tunisia	1:52.43	Q
5	Fidelis Kajang	Nigeria	1:54.10	
6	Lennox Ellis	Barbados	1:54.78	

==== Heat 2 ====
Rank	Name	Nationality	Time	Notes
1	Lee Jin-Il	South Korea	1:50.91	Q
2	Julio Fuentes	Cuba	1:51.66	Q
3	José Manuel Cerezo	Spain	1:51.77	Q
4	David Divad	France	1:52.13	Q
5	David Matthews	Ireland	1:52.56	
6	Mauro González	Chile	1:52.80	
7	Alexandre de Oliveira	Brazil	1:53.41	

==== Heat 3 ====
Rank	Name	Nationality	Time	Notes
1	Vénuste Niyongabo	Burundi	1:50.60	Q
2	Sasha Smiljanic	Canada	1:50.96	Q
3	Brendan Hanigan	Australia	1:51.50	Q
4	Marius van Heerden	South Africa	1:51.50	Q
5	Philipp Zeuch	Germany	1:51.79	q
6	Victor Matarrese	Argentina	1:52.94	
7	Paul Ignacio	Gibraltar	2:02.32	

==== Heat 4 ====
Rank	Name	Nationality	Time	Notes
1	Vincent Malakwen	Kenya	1:51.88	Q
2	Kim Soon-Hyung	South Korea	1:52.19	Q
3	Davide Cadoni	Italy	1:52.31	Q
4	Kevin Richardson	Australia	1:52.40	Q
5	Tomonari Ono	Japan	1:52.41	
6	Paul Walker	United Kingdom	1:52.85	
7	Mohamed Atteya Al-Muwaled	Saudi Arabia	1:54.47	

==== Heat 5 ====
Rank	Name	Nationality	Time	Notes
1	Michael Daniel	United States	1:51.09	Q
2	Zsombor Filep	Romania	1:51.15	Q
3	Igor Tolokonikov	Commonwealth of Independent States	1:51.16	Q
4	Hailu Zewde	Ethiopia	1:51.60	Q
5	Sören Schröder	Germany	1:51.93	q
6	Duncan O'Neil	Jamaica	1:51.99	q
7	Farah Ibrahim Ali Ahmed	Qatar	1:52.04	q

== Participation ==
According to an unofficial count, 34 athletes from 28 countries participated in the event.

- Argentina (1)
- Australia (2)
- Barbados (1)
- Brazil (1)
- Burundi (1)
- Canada (1)
- Chile (1)
- Commonwealth of Independent States (1)
- Cuba (1)
- Ethiopia (1)
- France (1)
- Germany (2)
- Gibraltar (1)
- Ireland (1)
- Italy (1)
- Jamaica (1)
- Japan (1)
- Kenya (2)
- Nigeria (1)
- Qatar (1)
- Romania (1)
- Saudi Arabia (1)
- South Africa (2)
- South Korea (2)
- Spain (1)
- Tunisia (1)
- United Kingdom (2)
- United States (1)
