= 1995 IAAF World Indoor Championships – Men's 800 metres =

The men's 800 metres event at the 1995 IAAF World Indoor Championships was held on 10–12 March.

== Medalists ==
Gold	Silver	Bronze
Clive Terrelonge; Jamaica	Benson Koech; Kenya	Pavel Soukup; Czech Republic

== Results ==
=== Heats ===
First 2 of each heat (Q) and next 2 fastest (q) qualified for the semifinals.

Rank	Heat	Name	Nationality	Time	Notes
1	5	Torbjörn Johansson	Sweden	1:49.57	Q
2	1	Pavel Soukup	Czech Republic	1:49.60	Q
3	5	Andrés Manuel Díaz	Spain	1:49.66	Q
4	1	Tor Øivind Ødegård	Norway	1:49.68	Q
5	5	Clive Terrelonge	Jamaica	1:49.73	q
6	4	David Matthews	Ireland	1:49.90	Q
7	5	Brad Sumner	United States	1:50.02	q
8	3	Mahjoub Haïda	Morocco	1:50.08	Q
9	4	Rich Kenah	United States	1:50.10	Q
10	4	Arthémon Hatungimana	Burundi	1:50.17	
11	3	Benson Koech	Kenya	1:50.48	Q
12	1	Michael Wildner	Austria	1:50.52	
13	1	António Abrantes	Portugal	1:50.94	
14	1	Ion Bogde	Romania	1:51.04	
15	2	Joseph Tengelei	Kenya	1:51.68	Q
16	2	José Arconada	Spain	1:51.80	Q
16	3	Tomonari Ono	Japan	1:51.80	
18	3	Tommy Asinga	Suriname	1:51.83	
19	2	Marco Chiavarini	Italy	1:51.92	
20	3	Rafko Marinič	Slovenia	1:52.57	
21	5	Kim Soon-hyung	South Korea	1:53.01	
22	2	Mahmoud Al-Kheirat	Syria	1:53.12	
23	4	Bekele Banbere	Ethiopia	1:54.56	
24	2	Arisk Perdomo	Guatemala	1:55.66	NR
25	2	Carlos Mairena	Nicaragua	1:56.54	NR
	3	Kennedy Osei	Ghana	DNF	
	4	Savieri Ngidhi	Zimbabwe	DNS	

=== Semifinals ===
First 3 of each semifinal qualified directly (Q) for the final.

Rank	Heat	Name	Nationality	Time	Notes
1	1	Benson Koech	Kenya	1:48.47	Q
2	1	Tor Øivind Ødegård	Norway	1:48.80	Q
3	1	Clive Terrelonge	Jamaica	1:48.82	Q
4	1	David Matthews	Ireland	1:49.26	
5	2	Pavel Soukup	Czech Republic	1:49.41	Q
6	2	Joseph Tengelei	Kenya	1:49.51	Q
7	2	Mahjoub Haïda	Morocco	1:49.72	Q
8	2	Torbjörn Johansson	Sweden	1:50.19	
9	1	Rich Kenah	United States	1:50.39	
10	2	José Arconada	Spain	1:50.98	
11	1	Andrés Manuel Díaz	Spain	1:51.19	
12	2	Brad Sumner	United States	1:51.60	

=== Final ===
Rank	Name	Nationality	Time	Notes
1st place, gold medalist(s)	Clive Terrelonge	Jamaica	1:47.30	
2nd place, silver medalist(s)	Benson Koech	Kenya	1:47.51	
3rd place, bronze medalist(s)	Pavel Soukup	Czech Republic	1:47.74	
4	Tor Øivind Ødegård	Norway	1:48.34	
5	Mahjoub Haïda	Morocco	1:48.63	
6	Joseph Tengelei	Kenya	1:49.22	
