= 1998 European Athletics Indoor Championships – Men's 800 metres =

The men's 800 metres event at the 1998 European Athletics Indoor Championships was held on 27 February–1 March.

== Medalists ==
Gold	Silver	Bronze
Nils Schumann; Germany	Marko Koers; Netherlands	Vebjørn Rodal; Norway

== Results ==
=== Heats ===
First 2 from each heat (Q) and the next 4 fastest (q) qualified for the semifinals.

Rank	Heat	Name	Nationality	Time	Notes
1	2	Gert-Jan Liefers	Netherlands	1:48.74	Q
2	2	James Nolan	Ireland	1:49.04	Q
3	4	Lukáš Vydra	Czech Republic	1:49.23	Q
4	4	Ivan Komar	Belarus	1:49.26	Q
5	4	Nils Schumann	Germany	1:49.33	q
6	2	Roman Oravec	Czech Republic	1:49.51	q
7	2	Pedro Antonio Esteso	Spain	1:49.63	q
8	3	Vebjørn Rodal	Norway	1:49.81	Q
9	3	David Matthews	Ireland	1:50.09	Q
10	2	Davide Cadoni	Italy	1:50.14	q
11	4	Tim Rogge	Belgium	1:50.24	
12	1	Marko Koers	Netherlands	1:50.40	Q
13	1	Einārs Tupurītis	Latvia	1:50.50	Q
14	4	Luis Javier González	Spain	1:50.59	
15	1	Nathan Kahan	Belgium	1:50.70	
16	1	Sergey Kozhevnikov	Russia	1:50.76	
17	3	Tom Omey	Belgium	1:50.89	
18	4	Michael Wildner	Austria	1:50.94	
19	2	Panayiotis Stroubakos	Greece	1:51.50	
20	1	Duarte Ponte	Portugal	1:52.87	
	3	Roberto Parra	Spain	DNF	
	3	Andrea Longo	Italy	DQ	

=== Semifinals ===
First 3 from each semifinal qualified directly (Q) for the final.

Rank	Heat	Name	Nationality	Time	Notes
1	1	Ivan Komar	Belarus	1:48.20	Q
2	1	Marko Koers	Netherlands	1:48.42	Q
3	1	David Matthews	Ireland	1:48.54	Q
4	1	Einārs Tupurītis	Latvia	1:48.89	
5	2	Vebjørn Rodal	Norway	1:49.81	Q
6	1	Davide Cadoni	Italy	1:49.83	
7	2	Nils Schumann	Germany	1:50.04	Q
8	1	Roman Oravec	Czech Republic	1:50.16	
9	2	James Nolan	Ireland	1:50.21	Q
10	2	Lukáš Vydra	Czech Republic	1:50.23	
11	2	Gert-Jan Liefers	Netherlands	1:50.82	
12	2	Pedro Antonio Esteso	Spain	1:50.96	

=== Final ===
Rank	Name	Nationality	Time	Notes
1st place, gold medalist(s)	Nils Schumann	Germany	1:47.02	
2nd place, silver medalist(s)	Marko Koers	Netherlands	1:47.20	
3rd place, bronze medalist(s)	Vebjørn Rodal	Norway	1:47.40	
4	James Nolan	Ireland	1:47.81	
5	David Matthews	Ireland	1:48.37	
6	Ivan Komar	Belarus	1:50.94	
