= 1994 European Athletics Championships – Men's 800 metres =

Men's 800 metres at the European Athletics Championships

The men's 800 metres event at the 1994 European Athletics Championships was held in Helsinki, Finland, at Helsinki Olympic Stadium on 11, 12, and 14 August 1994.

== Medalists ==
Gold	Andrea Benvenuti; Italy
Silver	Vebjørn Rodal; Norway
Bronze	Tomás De Teresa; Spain

== Results ==
=== Final ===
14 August

Rank	Name	Nationality	Time	Notes
1st place, gold medalist(s)	Andrea Benvenuti	Italy	1:46.12	
2nd place, silver medalist(s)	Vebjørn Rodal	Norway	1:46.53	
3rd place, bronze medalist(s)	Tomás De Teresa	Spain	1:46.57	
4	Nico Motchebon	Germany	1:46.65	
5	Giuseppe D'Urso	Italy	1:46.90	
6	Craig Winrow	Great Britain	1:47.09	
7	José Manuel Cerezo	Spain	1:47.58	
8	Atle Douglas	Norway	1:47.90	

=== Semi-finals ===
12 August

==== Semi-final 1 ====
Rank	Name	Nationality	Time	Notes
1	Andrea Benvenuti	Italy	1:47.01	Q
2	Atle Douglas	Norway	1:47.15	Q
3	José Manuel Cerezo	Spain	1:47.24	Q
4	Craig Winrow	Great Britain	1:47.24	Q
5	Marko Koers	Netherlands	1:47.52	
6	Mikael Söderman	Finland	1:48.00	
7	Frédéric Cornette	France	1:48.49	
8	Davide Cadoni	Italy	1:50.23	

==== Semi-final 2 ====
Rank	Name	Nationality	Time	Notes
1	Nico Motchebon	Germany	1:45.75	Q
2	Vebjørn Rodal	Norway	1:45.80	Q
3	Giuseppe D'Urso	Italy	1:45.88	Q
4	Tomás De Teresa	Spain	1:45.89	Q
5	Andrey Loginov	Russia	1:46.18	
6	Torbjörn Johansson	Sweden	1:46.25	
7	Bruno Konczylo	France	1:46.63	
8	Jarmo Kokkola	Finland	1:47.35	

=== Heats ===
11 August

==== Heat 1 ====
Rank	Name	Nationality	Time	Notes
1	Andrea Benvenuti	Italy	1:48.88	Q
2	José Manuel Cerezo	Spain	1:48.92	Q
3	Mikael Söderman	Finland	1:48.92	Q
4	Ousmane Diarra	France	1:49.09	
5	Joachim Dehmel	Germany	1:49.36	
6	Jussi Udelhoven	Norway	1:50.15	
7	Milan Drahoňovský	Czech Republic	1:50.27	
8	Thomas Ebner	Austria	1:50.71	

==== Heat 2 ====
Rank	Name	Nationality	Time	Notes
1	Atle Douglas	Norway	1:47.31	Q
2	Andrey Loginov	Russia	1:47.33	Q
3	Davide Cadoni	Italy	1:47.52	Q
4	Frédéric Cornette	France	1:47.60	q
5	António Abrantes	Portugal	1:47.61	
6	Esko Parpala	Finland	1:47.85	
7	Ivan Komar	Belarus	1:48.78	

==== Heat 3 ====
Rank	Name	Nationality	Time	Notes
1	Bruno Konczylo	France	1:47.91	Q
2	Tomás De Teresa	Spain	1:47.94	Q
3	Vebjørn Rodal	Norway	1:48.10	Q
4	Piotr Piekarski	Poland	1:48.50	
5	David Matthews	Ireland	1:48.91	
6	Tom McKean	Great Britain	1:49.41	
7	Oliver Münzer	Austria	1:49.59	

==== Heat 4 ====
Rank	Name	Nationality	Time	Notes
1	Giuseppe D'Urso	Italy	1:46.91	Q
2	Craig Winrow	Great Britain	1:46.93	Q
3	Nico Motchebon	Germany	1:46.97	Q
4	Marko Koers	Netherlands	1:47.18	q
5	Jarmo Kokkola	Finland	1:47.41	q
6	Torbjörn Johansson	Sweden	1:47.41	q
7	Slobodan Popović	Independent European Participants (Yugoslavia)	1:48.85	
8	Andrés Manuel Díaz	Spain	1:48.67	

== Participation ==
According to an unofficial count, 30 athletes from 17 countries participated in the event.

- Austria (2)
- Belarus (1)
- Czech Republic (1)
- Finland (3)
- France (3)
- Germany (2)
- Great Britain (2)
- Independent European Participants (Yugoslavia) (1)
- Ireland (1)
- Italy (3)
- Netherlands (1)
- Norway (3)
- Poland (1)
- Portugal (1)
- Russia (1)
- Spain (3)
- Sweden (1)
