= 1994 European Athletics Indoor Championships – Men's 800 metres =

The men's 800 metres event at the 1994 European Athletics Indoor Championships was held in Palais Omnisports de Paris-Bercy on 11, 12 and 13 March.

== Medalists ==
Gold	Silver	Bronze
Andrey Loginov; Russia	Luis Javier González; Spain	Ousmane Diarra; France

== Results ==
=== Heats ===
First 2 from each heat (Q) and the next 4 fastest (q) qualified for the semifinals.

Rank	Heat	Name	Nationality	Time	Notes
1	1	Andrey Loginov	Russia	1:47.47	Q
2	1	Nico Motchebon	Germany	1:47.66	Q
3	1	Bruno Konczylo	France	1:47.66	q, PB
4	1	Alfredo Lahuerta	Spain	1:48.01	q
5	1	Oliver Münzer	Austria	1:48.01	q
6	4	Martin Steele	Great Britain	1:48.69	Q
7	4	Frédéric Cornette	France	1:48.92	Q
8	4	Michael Wildner	Austria	1:49.20	q
9	4	José Arconada	Spain	1:49.39	
10	2	Luis Javier González	Spain	1:49.46	Q
11	2	Ousmane Diarra	France	1:49.59	Q
12	3	Torbjörn Johansson	Sweden	1:49.72	Q
13	3	Andrea Giocondi	Italy	1:49.85	Q
14	2	Craig Winrow	Great Britain	1:49.88	
15	2	Oliver Poeschl	Germany	1:49.94	
16	3	David Matthews	Ireland	1:50.24	
17	3	Anatoliy Makarevich	Belarus	1:50.56	
18	2	Leon Haan	Netherlands	1:50.74	
19	4	Tonny Baltus	Netherlands	1:50.60	
20	3	Marco Runge	Germany	1:52.89	

=== Semifinals ===
First 3 from each semifinal qualified directly (Q) for the final.

Rank	Heat	Name	Nationality	Time	Notes
1	1	Luis Javier González	Spain	1:48.58	Q
2	1	Andrey Loginov	Russia	1:48.90	Q
3	1	Torbjörn Johansson	Sweden	1:48.93	Q
4	2	Nico Motchebon	Germany	1:49.05	Q
5	1	Oliver Münzer	Austria	1:49.08	
6	1	Andrea Giocondi	Italy	1:49.08	
7	2	Bruno Konczylo	France	1:49.41	Q
8	2	Ousmane Diarra	France	1:49.45	Q
9	2	Alfredo Lahuerta	Spain	1:49.45	
10	2	Martin Steele	Great Britain	1:49.65	
11	2	Michael Wildner	Austria	1:50.49	
12	1	Frédéric Cornette	France	1:52.18	

=== Final ===
Rank	Name	Nationality	Time	Notes
1st place, gold medalist(s)	Andrey Loginov	Russia	1:46.38	NR
2nd place, silver medalist(s)	Luis Javier González	Spain	1:46.69	
3rd place, bronze medalist(s)	Ousmane Diarra	France	1:47.18	NR
4	Nico Motchebon	Germany	1:47.24	
5	Torbjörn Johansson	Sweden	1:47.42	
6	Bruno Konczylo	France	2:00.33	
