= IF Minerva =

Norwegian multi-sports club

- Full name: Idrettsforeningen Minerva
- Founded: 18 August 1918
- Arena: Lillestrøm stadion, Lillestrøm; Romerike friidrettsstadion, Lillestrøm; Skedsmohallen, Lillestrøm (indoors)

Idrettsforeningen Minerva was a Norwegian multi-sports club from Lillestrøm.

The club was founded on 18 August 1918 as TIF Minerva. It was a continuation of a school team that played association football at Lillestrøm Lower Secondary School, but instead took up gymnastics and athletics. Their first athletics meet was held in 1921. Over the years, proposals to merge the club with Lillestrøm TIF or Lillestrøm SK were voted down.

Minerva saw unprecedented success in the 1980s. Under the leadership of Bjørn Bergh, the club managed to win the Holmenkollstafetten road relay race for men in 1982. Well-known individual runners included John Halvorsen and Tor Øivind Ødegård. More and more elite athletes joined Minerva, spearheaded by thrower Trine Hattestad and jumpers Hanne Haugland, Håkon Särnblom and Trond Barthel. At the 1997 World Championships, Hattestad and Haugland became world champions on the same day, marking the zenith for Minerva.

In 1993, Minerva was formally split into three sections: IF Minerva for gymnastics, Minerva Friidrett for elite athletics, and Minerva IS for children's athletics. The club earned most of their income from the large road races Jentejoggen (about 10,000 participants) and Norgesløpet (5–6,000).

The elite section languished by the 2000s. In the end, Bjørn Bergh only operated the club on paper as owner of the Athletics Museum. This museum was opened as part of Lillestrøm's sport complex and included objects from Grete Waitz, Usain Bolt (the shoes in which he set the 100 metres world record) and countless others.

The section for children and young adults thrived, opening a new athletics stadium in 2006, Romerike friidrettsstadion. In 2013, it was decided to discontinue the club and then found Romerike Friidrett though a merger with the athletics section of Strømmen IF.
