= Roba =

Roba may refer to:

- Roba (TV series), a Finnish television series
- Jean Roba (1930–2006), a Belgian comics author best known for the popular comic Boule et Bill
- Roba Stanley (1908–1986), early American female country music recording artist
- a character from the American animated television series The Problem Solverz
- Espa Roba, a Yu-Gi-Oh! character

== Ethiopian name ==
Roba (Amharic: ሮባ) is a male given name of Ethiopian origin that may refer to:

- Roba Gari (born 1982), Ethiopian steeplechase runner
- Alemayehu Roba (born 1972), retired Ethiopian male middle-distance runner
- Fatuma Roba (born 1973), Ethiopian female marathon runner and 1996 Olympic champion
