= Athletics at the 1993 Summer Universiade – Men's 800 metres =

The men's 800 metres event at the 1993 Summer Universiade was held at the UB Stadium in Buffalo, United States 14–16 July 1993.

== Medalists ==
Gold	Silver	Bronze
Marko Koers; Netherlands	Oleg Stepanov; Russia	Nico Motchebon; Germany

== Results ==
=== Heats ===
Rank	Heat	Athlete	Nationality	Time	Notes
1	4	Fotis Deligiannis	Greece	1:47.91	Q
2	4	Simon Lewin	Australia	1:48.01	Q
3	5	Andrew Lill	Great Britain	1:48.42	Q
4	5	Oleg Stepanov	Russia	1:48.45	Q
5	5	Brad Sumner	United States	1:48.73	q
6	5	Orlando Castro	Spain	1:49.09	q
7	3	Jihad Al-Balawi	Jordan	1:49.43	Q
7	4	Eyvind Solbu	Norway	1:49.43	q
9	6	Tommy Asinga	Suriname	1:49.44	Q
10	5	Einārs Tupurītis	Latvia	1:49.54	q
11	3	Nico Motchebon	Germany	1:49.59	Q
12	6	Mohamed Mounaouar	Morocco	1:49.61	Q
13	4	Martin Johns	New Zealand	1:49.75	
14	6	André Inniss	Guyana	1:49.83	
15	3	Miklós Árpási	Hungary	1:49.96	
16	6	Kim Yong-hwan	South Korea	1:50.08	
17	1	Dávid Somfay	Hungary	1:50.31	Q
18	4	Desmond English	Ireland	1:50.34	
19	1	Marko Runge	Germany	1:50.56	Q
20	3	Paul Walker	Great Britain	1:50.63	
21	6	Javier Soto	Puerto Rico	1:50.69	
22	1	António Abrantes	Portugal	1:50.74	
23	3	Scott Peters	United States	1:51.44	
24	3	Mårten Barkwall	Sweden	1:51.45	
25	1	Pavel Soukup	Czech Republic	1:51.52	
26	2	Marko Koers	Netherlands	1:51.58	Q
27	2	Jamo Kokkola	Finland	1:51.59	Q
28	2	Sergey Mitov	Bulgaria	1:51.75	
29	2	Peter Philipp	Switzerland	1:52.54	
30	2	Charles Baryamujura	Uganda	1:53.98	
31	6	Andrés Manuel Díaz	Spain	1:54.74	
32	3	Themba Makhanya	Swaziland	1:54.92	
33	1	Jonny Gallo	Costa Rica	1:55.58	
34	4	Xandru Grech	Malta	1:56.94	
35	5	Thompson Harokave	Papua New Guinea	1:57.84	
36	2	Luis Díaz	Venezuela	1:58.01	
37	1	Robert Dlangamawdla	Lesotho	2:00.50	
38	6	Hussein Makke	Lebanon	2:02.33	
39	1	Ahmed Abdullah Robleh	Qatar	2:02.94	
40	5	W. Rohana	Sri Lanka	2:05.90	
	3	Mohamed Rahim	Morocco	DQ	
	4	Lee Jin-il	South Korea	DQ	
	6	Engelhardt Uiseb	Namibia	DQ	
	5	Emmanuel Ngega	Tanzania	DNF	

=== Semifinals ===
Rank	Heat	Athlete	Nationality	Time	Notes
1	1	Marko Koers	Netherlands	1:48.15	Q
2	1	Jihad Al-Balawi	Jordan	1:48.25	Q, NR
3	1	Marko Runge	Germany	1:48.39	Q
4	1	Simon Lewin	Australia	1:48.40	Q
5	1	Andrew Lill	Great Britain	1:48.43	
6	1	Orlando Castro	Spain	1:48.70	
7	1	Mohamed Mounaouar	Morocco	1:49.36	
8	2	Oleg Stepanov	Russia	1:49.65	Q
9	2	Nico Motchebon	Germany	1:49.72	Q
10	2	Fotis Deligiannis	Greece	1:49.79	Q
11	2	Tommy Asinga	Suriname	1:49.92	Q
12	2	Brad Sumner	United States	1:50.09	
13	2	Jarmo Kokkola	Finland	1:50.25	
14	2	Dávid Somfay	Hungary	1:50.55	
15	1	Eyvind Solbu	Norway	1:50.97	
16	2	Einārs Tupurītis	Latvia	1:52.16	

=== Final ===
Rank	Athlete	Nationality	Time	Notes
1st place, gold medalist(s)	Marko Koers	Netherlands	1:48.57	
2nd place, silver medalist(s)	Oleg Stepanov	Russia	1:49.50	
3rd place, bronze medalist(s)	Nico Motchebon	Germany	1:49.52	
4	Fotis Deligiannis	Greece	1:50.13	
5	Jihad Al-Balawi	Jordan	1:50.42	
6	Simon Lewin	Australia	1:50.98	
7	Tommy Asinga	Suriname	1:51.58	
8	Marko Runge	Germany	1:58.55	
