= 1997 European Athletics U23 Championships – Men's 800 metres =

The men's 800 metres event at the 1997 European Athletics U23 Championships was held in Turku, Finland, on 11, 12, and 13 July 1997.

== Medalists ==
Gold	Andrea Longo; Italy
Silver	André Bucher; Switzerland
Bronze	Grzegorz Krzosek; Poland

== Results ==
=== Final ===
13 July

Rank	Name	Nationality	Time	Notes
1st place, gold medalist(s)	Andrea Longo	Italy	1:46.49	
2nd place, silver medalist(s)	André Bucher	Switzerland	1:47.13	
3rd place, bronze medalist(s)	Grzegorz Krzosek	Poland	1:47.45	
4	Tim Rogge	Belgium	1:47.77	
5	James Nolan	Ireland	1:47.98	
6	Viktors Lācis	Latvia	1:48.49	
7	Artyom Mastrov	Russia	1:48.74	
8	Wojciech Kałdowski	Poland	1:49.48	

=== Semifinals ===
12 July
Qualified: first 4 in each to the Final

==== Semifinal 1 ====
Rank	Name	Nationality	Time	Notes
1	Grzegorz Krzosek	Poland	1:49.57	Q
2	André Bucher	Switzerland	1:49.62	Q
3	James Nolan	Ireland	1:49.85	Q
4	Artyom Mastrov	Russia	1:49.91	Q
5	Felix Leiter	Germany	1:50.13	
6	Sergey Yakovlev	Belarus	1:50.70	
7	Filip Jedlík	Czech Republic	1:51.07	
8	Mickaël Hotyat	France	1:52.77	

==== Semifinal 2 ====
Rank	Name	Nationality	Time	Notes
1	Andrea Longo	Italy	1:48.49	Q
2	Viktors Lācis	Latvia	1:48.80	Q
3	Wojciech Kałdowski	Poland	1:48.82	Q
4	Tim Rogge	Belgium	1:48.87	Q
5	Roman Tarasov	Russia	1:48.91	
6	Umet Uusorg	Estonia	1:49.69	
7	Martin Jareš	Czech Republic	1:49.97	
8	Nuno Lopes	Portugal	1:50.82	

=== Heats ===
11 July
Qualified: first 4 in each heat and 4 best to the Semifinal

==== Heat 1 ====
Rank	Name	Nationality	Time	Notes
1	Tim Rogge	Belgium	1:52.71	Q
2	Artyom Mastrov	Russia	1:52.73	Q
3	James Nolan	Ireland	1:52.77	Q
4	Viktors Lācis	Latvia	1:52.79	Q
5	István Nagy	Hungary	1:52.79	
6	Pedro Esteso	Spain	1:52.89	
7	Yoseph Gizatcho	Israel	1:54.47	
8	Dalibor Balgač	Croatia	1:54.54	

==== Heat 2 ====
Rank	Name	Nationality	Time	Notes
1	André Bucher	Switzerland	1:49.36	Q
2	Grzegorz Krzosek	Poland	1:49.36	Q
3	Nuno Lopes	Portugal	1:49.41	Q
4	Roman Tarasov	Russia	1:49.46	Q
5	Mickaël Hotyat	France	1:49.70	q
6	Umet Uusorg	Estonia	1:50.21	q
7	Martin Jareš	Czech Republic	1:50.63	q
8	Felix Leiter	Germany	1:50.76	q

==== Heat 3 ====
Rank	Name	Nationality	Time	Notes
1	Andrea Longo	Italy	1:50.19	Q
2	Wojciech Kałdowski	Poland	1:50.54	Q
3	Sergey Yakovlev	Belarus	1:50.74	Q
4	Filip Jedlík	Czech Republic	1:50.93	Q
5	Jean-Gilles Talin	France	1:51.12	
6	José Antonio Redolat	Spain	1:52.97	
7	Constantinos Hadjimarcou	Cyprus	1:53.87	

== Participation ==
According to an unofficial count, 23 athletes from 18 countries participated in the event.

- Belarus (1)
- Belgium (1)
- Croatia (1)
- Cyprus (1)
- Czech Republic (2)
- Estonia (1)
- France (2)
- Germany (1)
- Hungary (1)
- Ireland (1)
- Israel (1)
- Italy (1)
- Latvia (1)
- Poland (2)
- Portugal (1)
- Russia (2)
- Spain (2)
- Switzerland (1)
