= Andrea Benvenuti =

Italian middle-distance runner

Personal information
- Born: 13 December 1969 (age 56) Negrar, Italy
- Height: 1.83 m (6 ft 0 in)
- Weight: 72 kg (159 lb)

Sport
- Country: Italy
- Sport: Athletics
- Event: 800 metres
- Club: Fiamme Azzurre
- Coached by: Gianni Ghidini

Achievements and titles
- Personal bests: 800 m: 1:43.92 (1992); 1000 m: 2:15.76 (1992)
Medal record
Men's athletics
Representing Italy
European Championships
Gold medal – first place	1994 Helsinki	800 m

Andrea Benvenuti (born 13 December 1969 in Negrar, Verona) is an Italian former 800 metres runner. He won the gold medal at the 1994 European Athletics Championships.

== Biography ==
He was born in Negrar di Valpolicella, in the Province of Verona. He became the first Italian man to win a European 800 metres title when he won the gold medal at the 1994 European Championships in Helsinki, Finland ahead of Vebjörn Rodal.

Previously, he had finished in fifth place in the final of the 800 metres at the 1992 Summer Olympics in Barcelona, Spain and was the highest European finisher in the race. Five days after his fifth place at the Barcelona Olympics in 1992 he set his personal best of 1:43.92 for the 800 metres racing in Monte Carlo. He also recorded a win at the 1992 Gran Prix d'Atletica in Turin. He placed third in the 1992 IAAF World Cup in Cuba, and represented his country at the 1993 World Championships in Athletics.

He is the Italian record holder of the 1000 metres with the time of 2:15.76. His personal best in 800 metres is 1:43.92. He is a two-time national champion at the Italian Athletics Championships. After his retirement, he was entered into the FIDAL Hall of Fame.

After his running career, he took up an administrative role in San Marino, having a responsibility for the athletic trainers for the Federazione Sammarinese Giuoco Calcio (FSGC).

== Personal life ==
After his sporting career, Benvenuti worked as a physiotherapist in Italy before moving to work in San Marino. Benvenuti and his wife Elena Vagnini, also a former middle-distance runner, have twin sons Tommaso and Giacomo Benvenuti who are both professional footballers who play for the San Marino national football team. They also have a daughter, Martina.

== International competitions ==
Year	Competition	Venue	Position	Event	Notes
Representing Italy
1988	World Junior Championships	Sudbury, Canada	23rd (sf)	800 m	1:57.48
1992	Olympic Games	Barcelona, Spain	5th	800 metres	1:45.23
1994	European Championships	Helsinki, Finland	1st	800 m	1:46.12

== National titles ==
- Italian Athletics Championships
  - 800 m outdoor: 1992
  - 800 m indoor: 1991

== See also ==
- Italian all-time lists - 800 metres
