= Folkets idrettspris =

Norwegian sports award

Folkets idrettspris (lit. 'The People's Sports Prize') is an annual sports award presented by the Norwegian newspaper Dagbladet. At the end of each year, the newspaper nominates candidates among Norwegian athletes, teams, and coaches of Norwegian athletes or teams. The nominee who receives the most votes wins the award. Voting takes place via the newspaper's website, Dagbladet.no.

Folkets idrettspris has been awarded annually since 1990, when speed skater Johann Olav Koss became the first winner. Magnus Carlsen has won the award the most times, with five wins, and is the only person to win three consecutive times (in 2012, 2013, and 2014). Dagbladet has been the main organizer of the vote since its inception, though Norsk Tipping and radio station P4 have previously served as co-organizers.

Similar awards named "Folkets idrettspris" are also organized by local newspapers, where readers vote for local athletes.

== Winners ==
Year	Winner	Sport
1990	Johann Olav Koss	Speed skating
1991	Johann Olav Koss (2)	Speed skating
1992	Vegard Ulvang	Cross-country skiing
1993	Norway national football team ("Drillos")	Football
1994	Johann Olav Koss (3)	Speed skating
1995	Bjørn Dæhlie	Cross-country skiing
1996	Vebjørn Rodal	Athletics (middle-distance running)
1997	Rosenborg BK	Football
1998	Norway national football team ("Drillos") (2)	Football
1999	Norway women's national handball team ("Håndballjentene")	Handball
2000	Knut Holmann	Kayaking
2001	John Arne Riise	Football
2002	Petter Solberg	Rallying
2003	Petter Solberg (2)	Rallying
2004	Andreas Thorkildsen	Athletics (javelin throw)
2005	Thor Hushovd	Cycling
2006	Ole Einar Bjørndalen	Biathlon and cross-country skiing
2007	Aksel Lund Svindal	Alpine skiing
2008	Norway women's national handball team ("Håndballjentene") (2)	Handball
2009	Magnus Carlsen	Chess
2010	Thor Hushovd (2)	Cycling
2011	Cecilia Brækhus	Boxing
2012	Magnus Carlsen (2)	Chess
2013	Magnus Carlsen (3)	Chess
2014	Magnus Carlsen (4)	Chess
2015	Petter Northug	Cross-country skiing
2016	Magnus Carlsen (5)	Chess
2017	Karsten Warholm	Athletics
2018	Jakob Ingebrigtsen	Athletics
2019	Karsten Warholm (2)	Athletics
2020	Bodø/Glimt	Football
2021	Karsten Warholm (3)	Athletics
2022	Casper Ruud	Tennis
2023	Viktor Hovland	Golf
2024	Thórir Hergeirsson	Handball

== Gallery ==
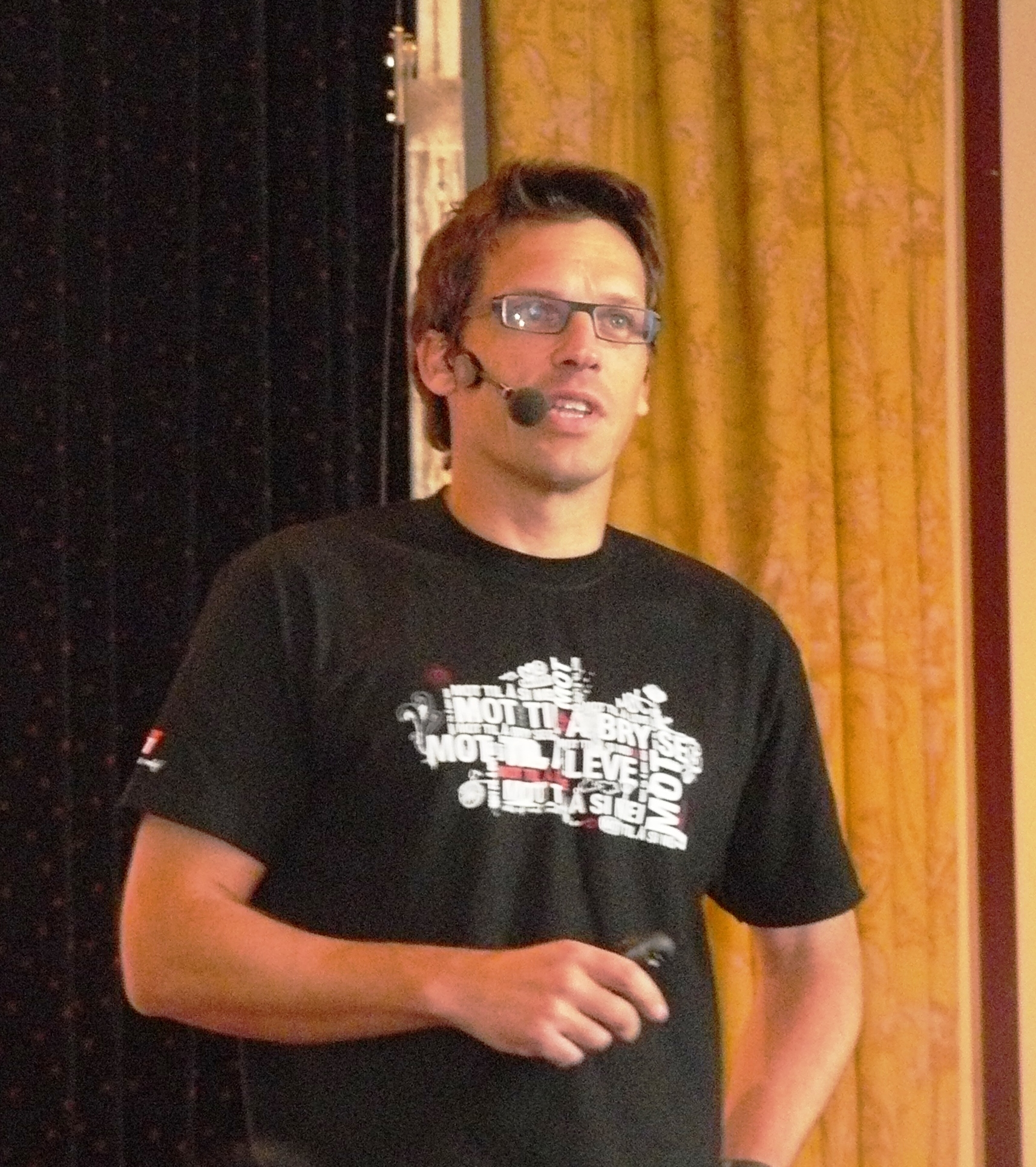
Johann Olav Koss, winner in 1990, 1991, and 1994

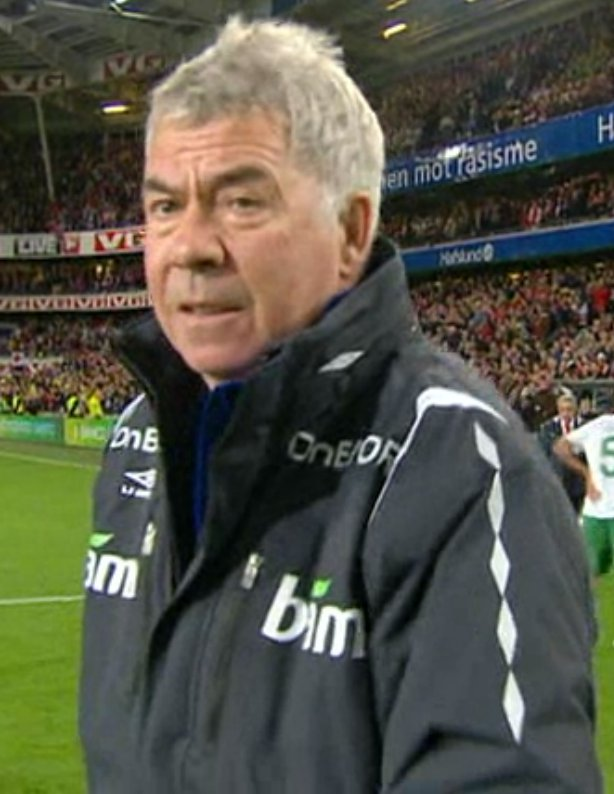
Norway national football team, represented by Egil "Drillo" Olsen, winner in 1993 and 1998

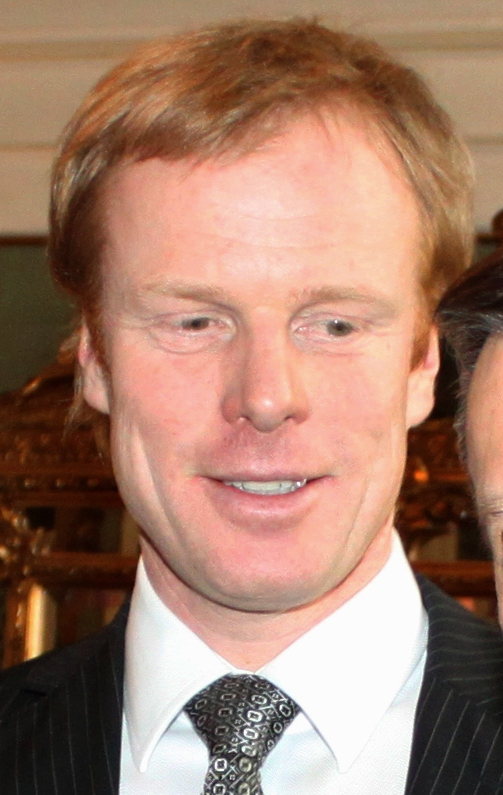
Bjørn Dæhlie, winner in 1995

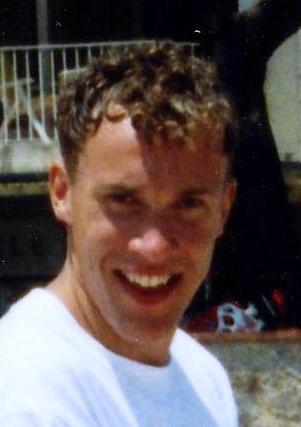
Vebjørn Rodal, winner in 1996

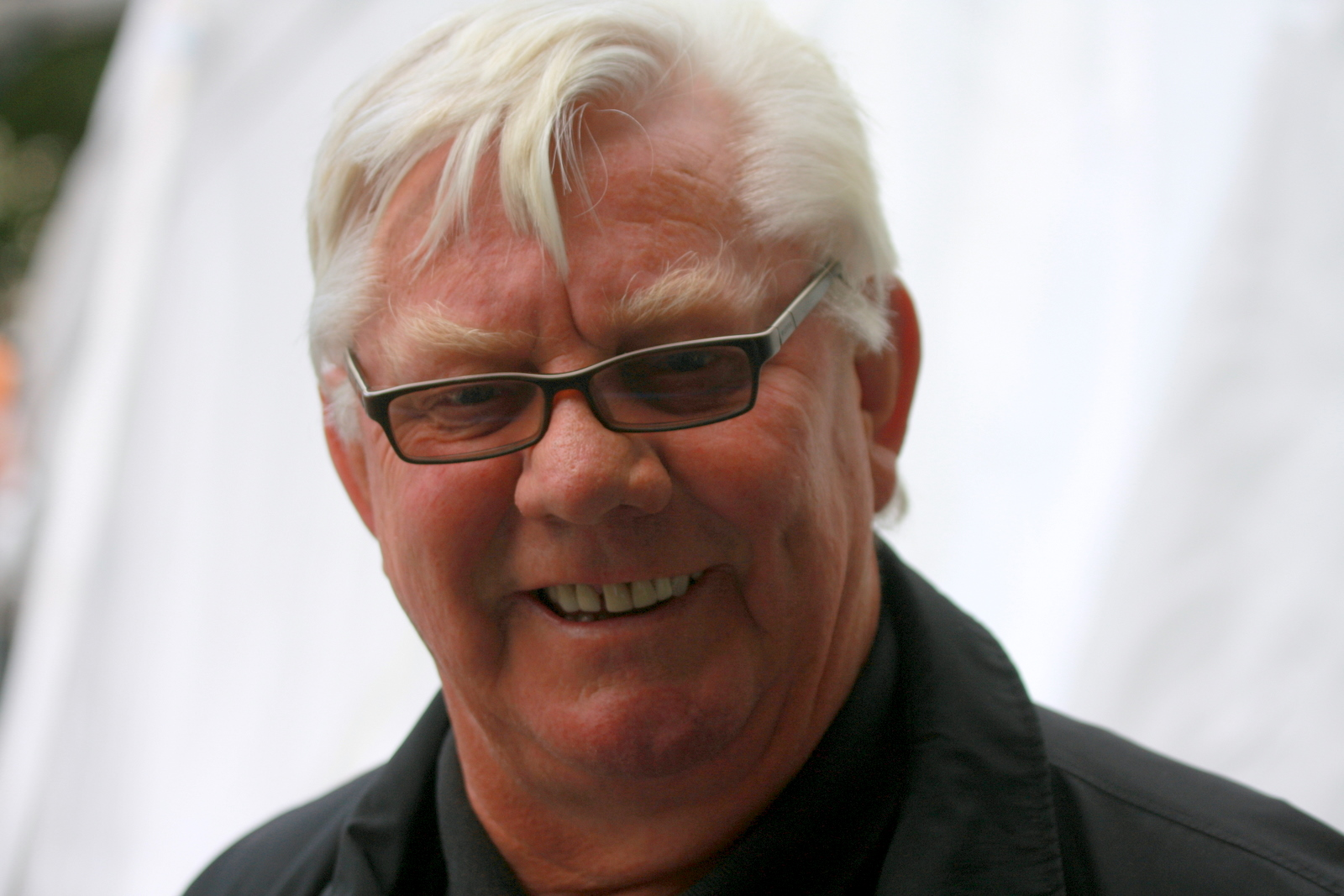
Rosenborg BK, represented by Nils Arne Eggen, winner in 1997

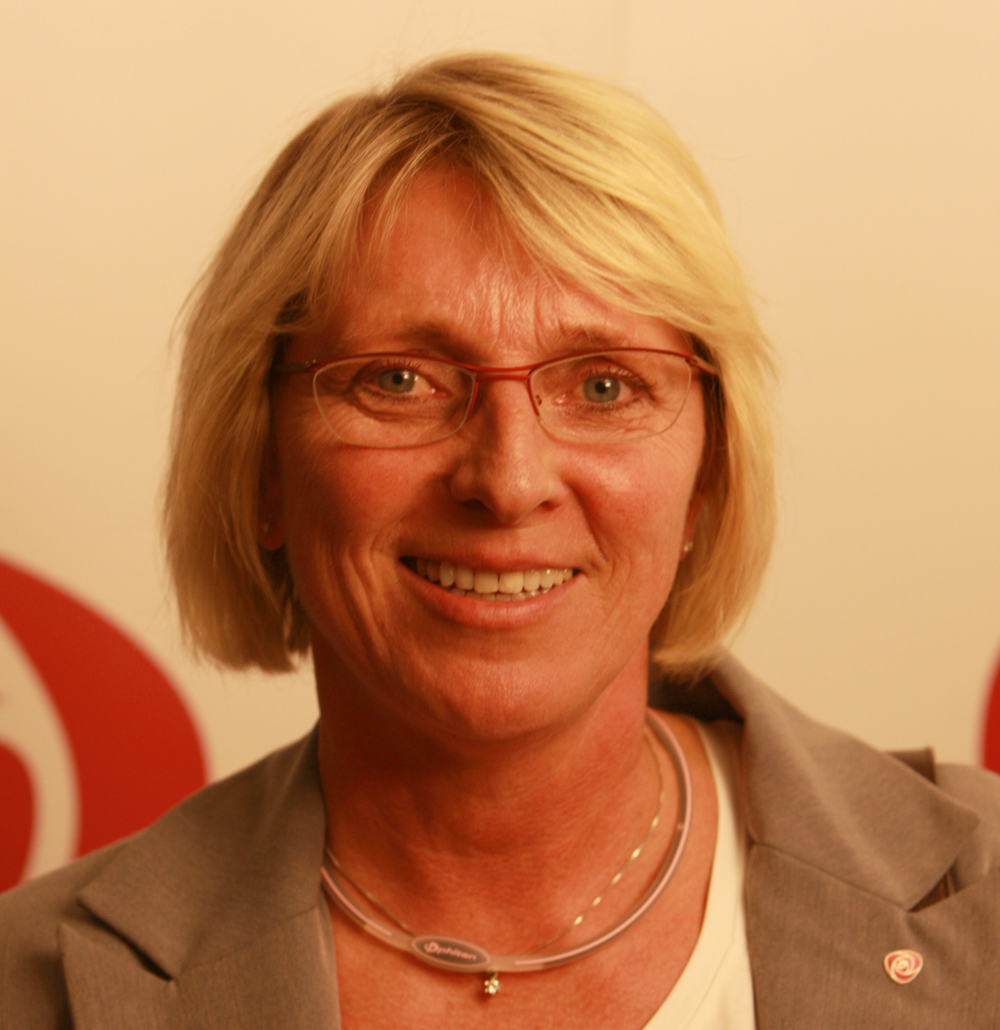
Norway women's national handball team, represented by Marit Breivik, winner in 1999 and 2008

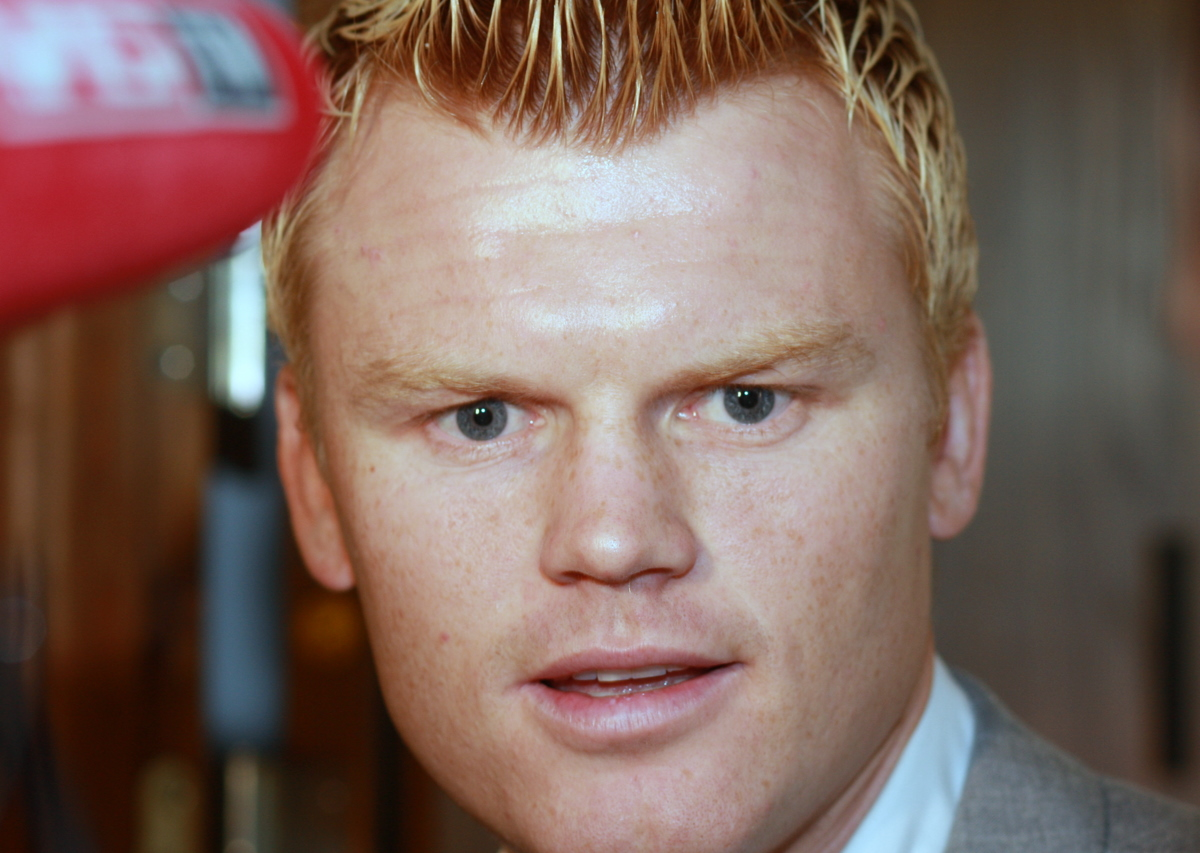
John Arne Riise, winner in 2001

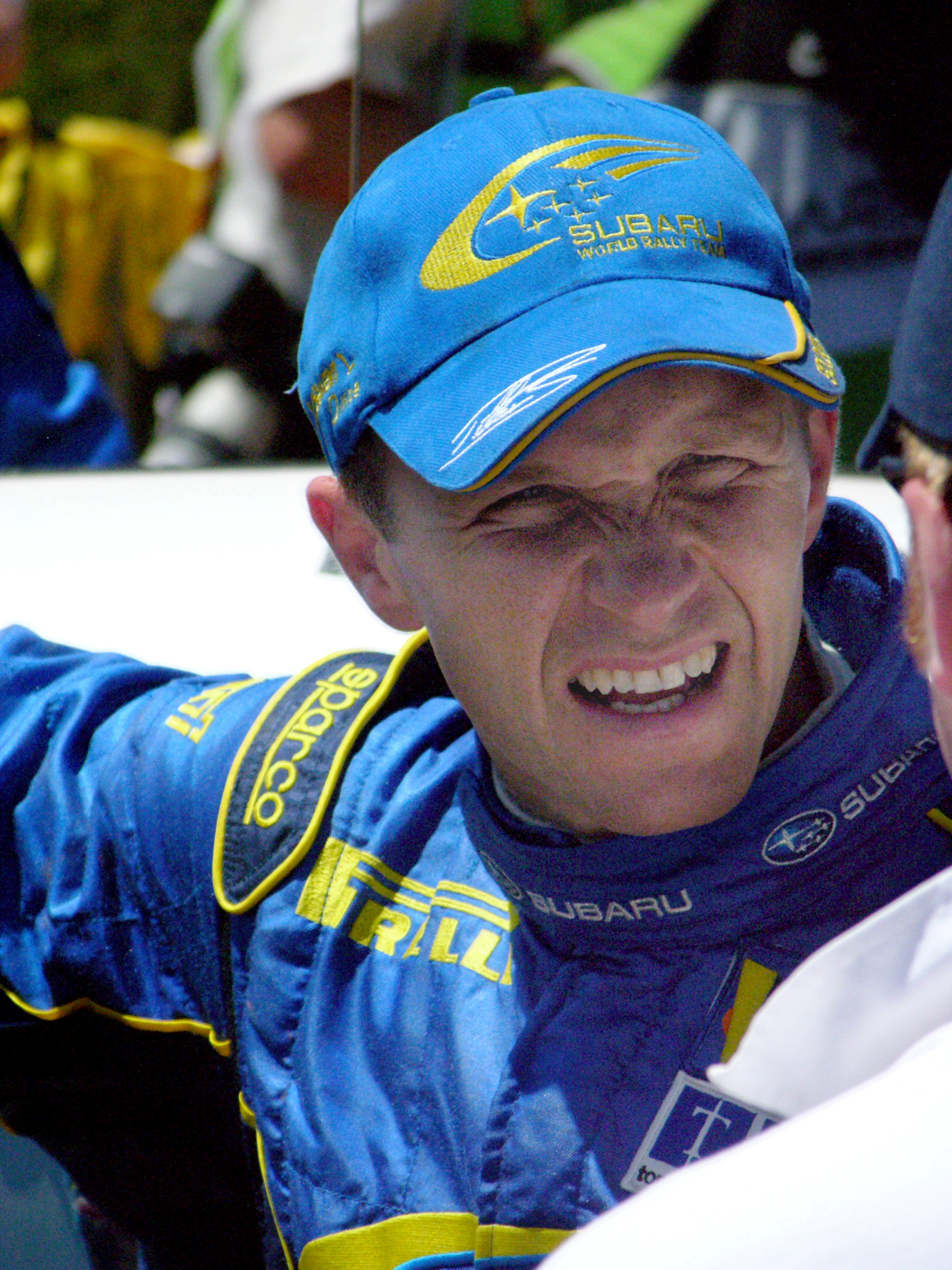
Petter Solberg, winner in 2002 and 2003

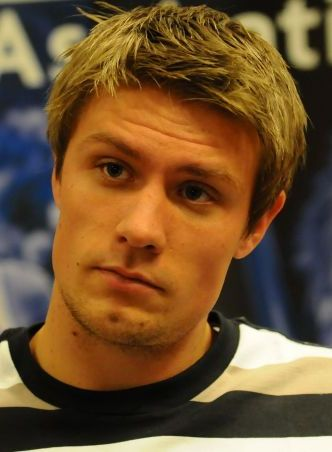
Andreas Thorkildsen, winner in 2004

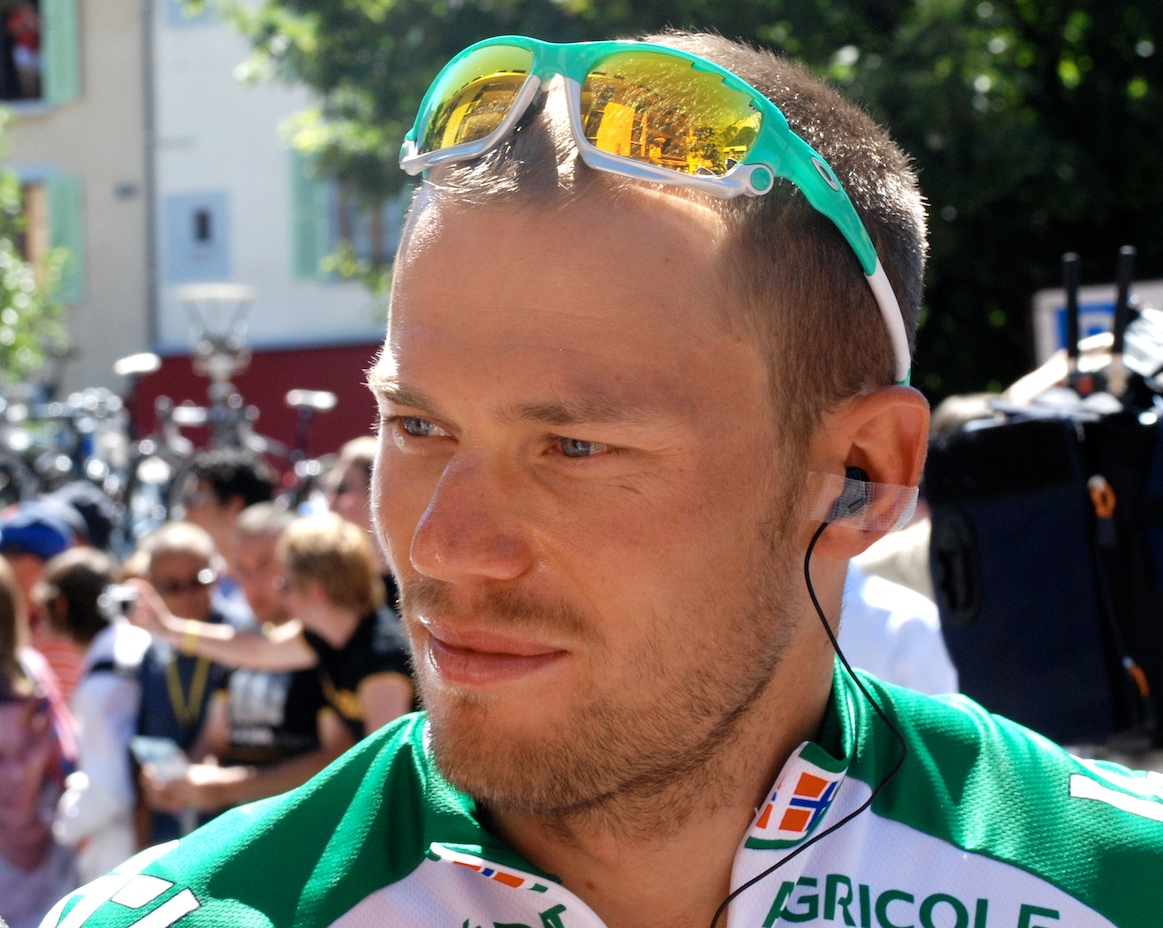
Thor Hushovd, winner in 2005 and 2010

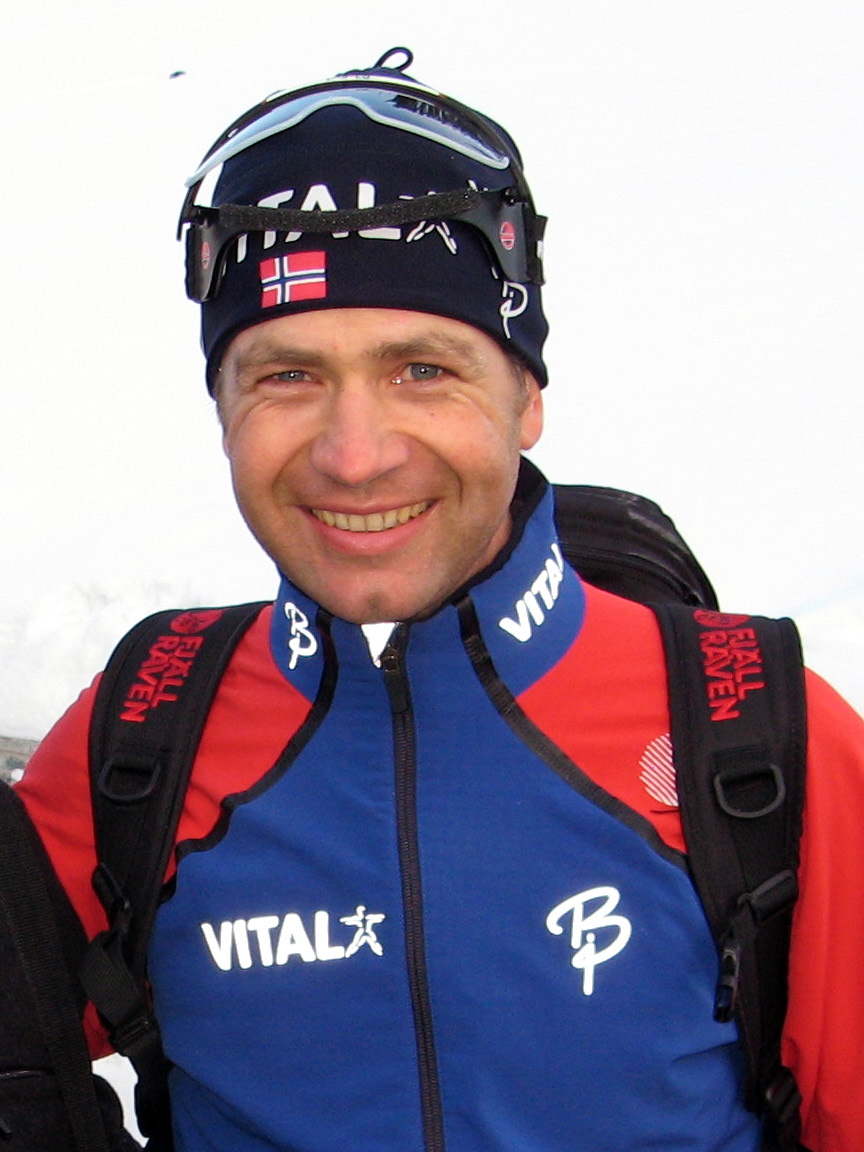
Ole Einar Bjørndalen, winner in 2006

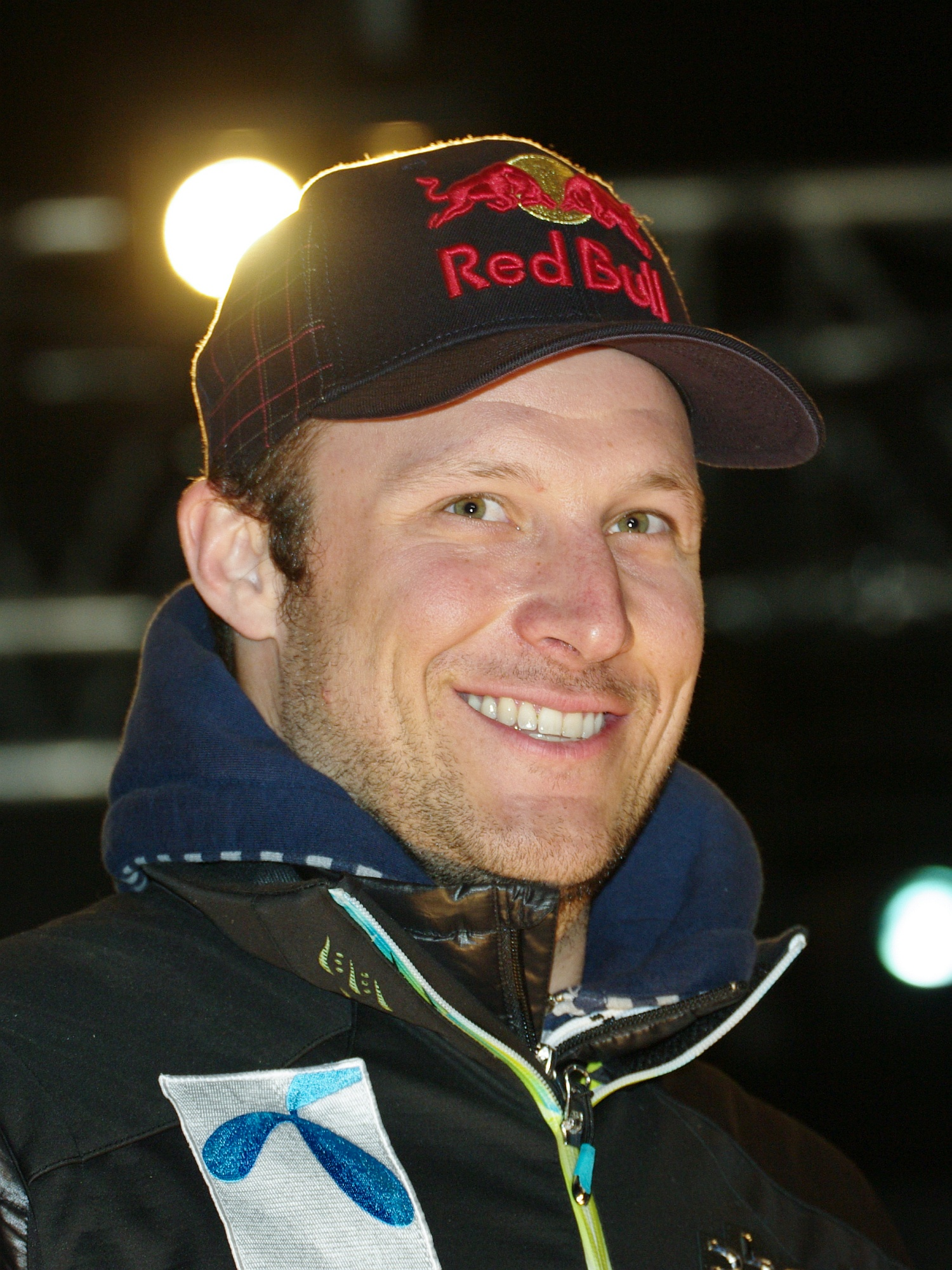
Aksel Lund Svindal, winner in 2007

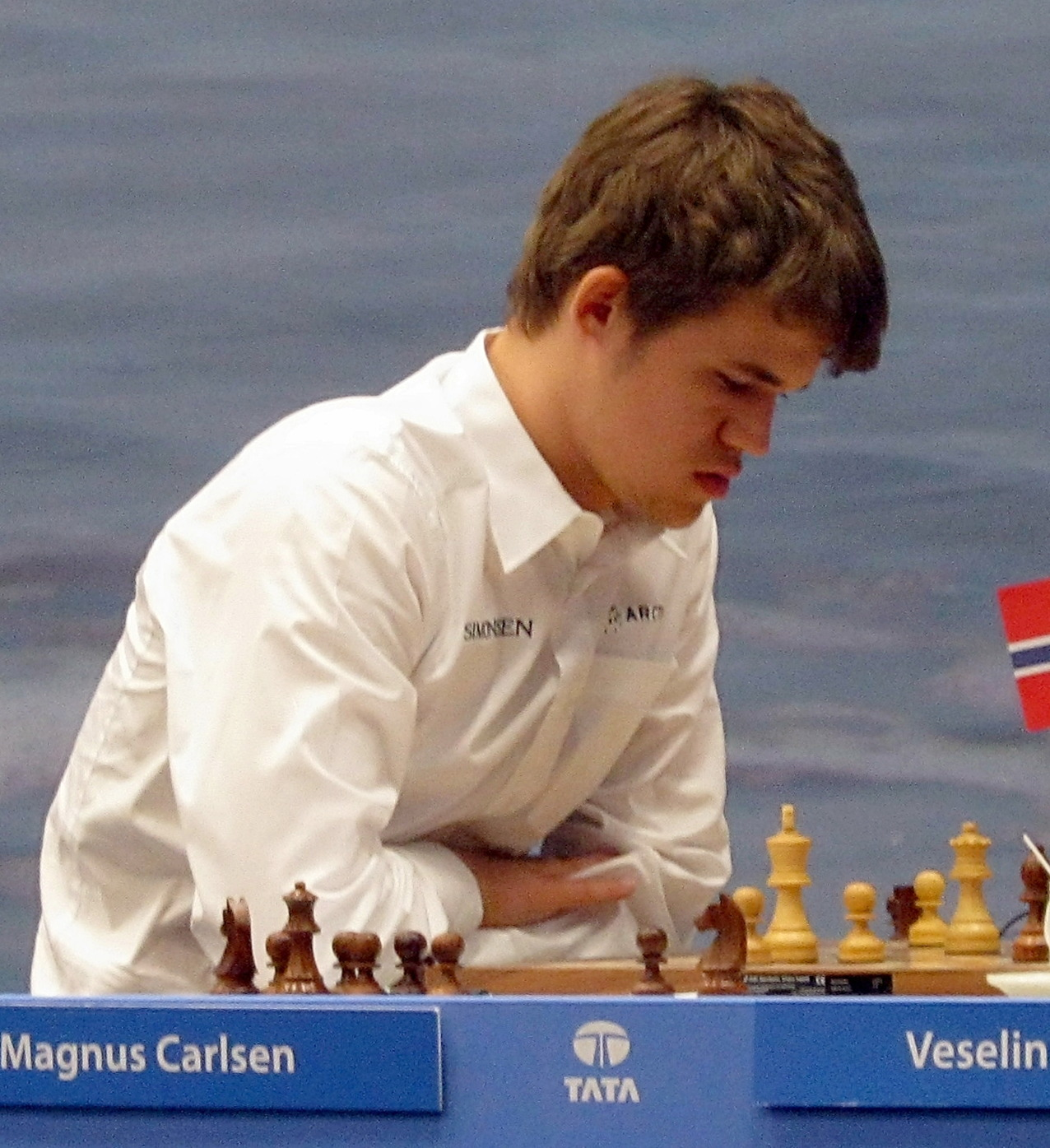
Magnus Carlsen, winner in 2009, 2012, 2013, 2014, and 2016

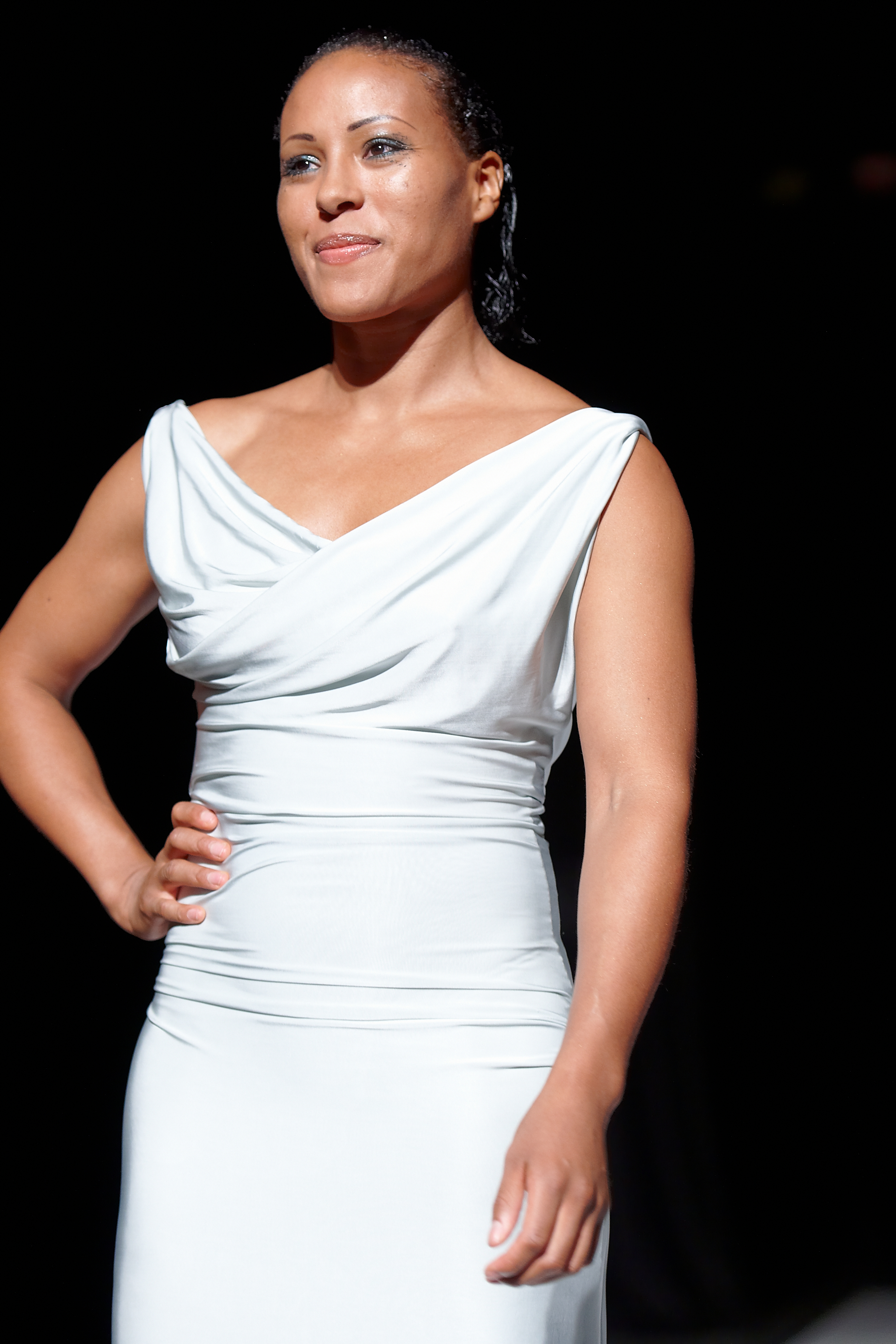
Cecilia Brækhus, winner in 2011

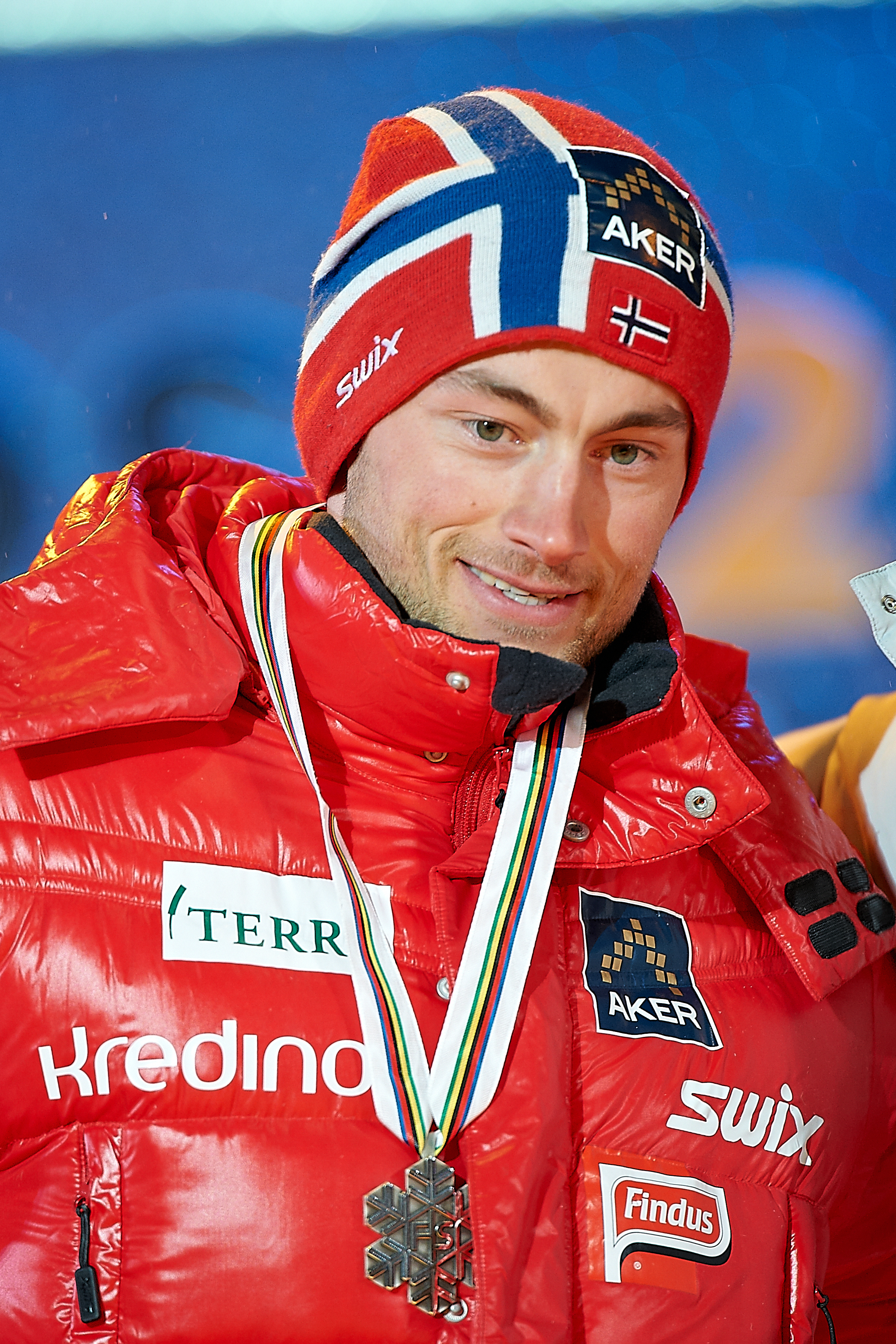
Petter Northug, winner in 2015
