= Giacomo Benvenuti =

Giacomo Benvenuti may refer to:

- Giacomo Benvenuti (composer) (1885–1943), Italian composer and musicologist
- Giacomo Benvenuti (footballer) (born 2006), Sammarinese footballer
