= 1996 European Athletics Indoor Championships – Men's 800 metres =

The men's 800 metres event at the 1996 European Athletics Indoor Championships was held in Stockholm Globe Arena on 8–10 March.

== Medalists ==
Gold	Silver	Bronze
Roberto Parra; Spain	Giuseppe D'Urso; Italy	Wojciech Kałdowski; Poland

== Results ==
=== Heats ===
First 2 from each heat (Q) and the next 4 fastest (q) qualified for the semifinals.

Rank	Heat	Name	Nationality	Time	Notes
1	2	Andrea Longo	Italy	1:48.60	Q
2	2	Andrés Manuel Díaz	Spain	1:48.99	Q
3	3	Roberto Parra	Spain	1:49.62	Q
4	3	Giuseppe D'Urso	Italy	1:49.62	Q
5	3	Wojciech Kałdowski	Poland	1:49.80	q
6	2	Michael Wildner	Austria	1:49.99	q
7	2	Jean-Christophe Vialettes	France	1:49.99	q
8	3	Felix-Imram Sillah	Germany	1:50.55	q
9	1	Andrea Giocondi	Italy	1:51.48	Q
10	1	Dian Petkov	Bulgaria	1:51.68	Q
11	1	James Nolan	Ireland	1:51.68	
12	3	Tim Rogge	Belgium	1:51.69	
13	1	Luis Javier González	Spain	1:51.83	
14	1	Torbjörn Johansson	Sweden	1:52.52	
15	3	Vanco Stojanov	Macedonia	1:56.06	
16	2	José Azevedo	Portugal	1:57.57	

=== Semifinals ===
First 2 from each semifinal (Q) and the next 2 fastest (q) qualified for the final.

Rank	Heat	Name	Nationality	Time	Notes
1	2	Andrés Manuel Díaz	Spain	1:48.69	Q
2	2	Giuseppe D'Urso	Italy	1:48.86	Q
3	2	Michael Wildner	Austria	1:49.26	q
4	1	Roberto Parra	Spain	1:49.82	Q
4	2	Andrea Longo	Italy	1:49.82	q
6	1	Wojciech Kałdowski	Poland	1:49.86	Q
7	1	Dian Petkov	Bulgaria	1:50.17	
8	1	Andrea Giocondi	Italy	1:50.46	
9	1	Felix-Imram Sillah	Germany	1:50.88	
10	2	Jean-Christophe Vialettes	France	1:51.86	

=== Final ===
Rank	Name	Nationality	Time	Notes
1st place, gold medalist(s)	Roberto Parra	Spain	1:47.74	
2nd place, silver medalist(s)	Giuseppe D'Urso	Italy	1:48.04	
3rd place, bronze medalist(s)	Wojciech Kałdowski	Poland	1:48.40	
4	Michael Wildner	Austria	1:48.64	
5	Andrea Longo	Italy	1:49.19	
	Andrés Manuel Díaz	Spain	DQ	
