= Athletics at the 1997 Summer Universiade – Men's 800 metres =

The men's 800 metres event at the 1997 Summer Universiade was held at the Stadio Cibali in Catania, Italy, on 29 and 30 August.

== Medalists ==
Gold	Silver	Bronze
Norberto Téllez; Cuba	Hezekiél Sepeng; South Africa	Bryan Woodward; United States

== Results ==
=== Heats ===
Held on 29 August

Rank	Heat	Athlete	Nationality	Time	Notes
1	1	Djabir Saïd-Guerni	Algeria	1:48.13	Q
2	6	Oleg Stepanov	Russia	1:48.35	Q
3	1	Balázs Tölgyesi	Hungary	1:48.47	Q
4	3	Shaun Benefield	United States	1:48.73	Q
5	3	Andy Hart	Great Britain	1:48.84	Q
6	1	Daryl Fillion	Canada	1:48.91	q
7	6	Mark Sesay	Great Britain	1:48.92	Q
8	3	Jean-Gilles Talin	France	1:49.00	q
9	1	Duarte Ponte	Portugal	1:49.13	q
10	6	Paul Byrne	Australia	1:49.29	q
11	6	Celso Ficagna	Brazil	1:49.69	q
12	8	Bryan Woodward	United States	1:50.15	Q
13	5	Gert-Jan Liefers	Netherlands	1:50.26	Q
14	8	Bjørn Arild Bøhleng	Norway	1:50.30	Q
15	8	Miklós Árpási	Hungary	1:50.33	q
16	5	Panagiotis Stroumbakos	Greece	1:50.35	Q
17	8	Barnaby Shone	South Africa	1:50.49	q
18	1	Eyvind Solbu	Norway	1:50.82	q
19	2	Norberto Téllez	Cuba	1:50.93	Q
20	2	Tim Rogge	Belgium	1:50.96	Q
21	2	Urmet Uusorg	Estonia	1:51.06	
22	5	Kim Soon-hyung	South Korea	1:51.07	
23	7	Sergey Kozhevnikov	Russia	1:51.21	Q
24	7	Nico Motchebon	Germany	1:51.21	Q
25	5	Aleš Tomič	Slovenia	1:51.36	
26	7	Grzegorz Krzosek	Poland	1:51.52	
27	7	Dennis van Tongeren	Netherlands	1:51.95	
28	2	Sylvere Ntibushinitse	Burundi	1:52.11	
29	8	Noureddine Djazouli	Algeria	1:52.50	
30	2	Christian Díaz	Argentina	1:52.57	
31	4	Hezekiél Sepeng	South Africa	1:52.66	Q
32	4	Roman Oravec	Czech Republic	1:53.22	Q
33	5	Vanko Stoyanov	Macedonia	1:53.51	
34	7	Hamid Sadjadi	Iran	1:53.60	
35	7	Mark Harris	New Zealand	1:53.79	
36	1	Xandru Grech	Malta	1:54.08	
37	6	Petrus Ndara	Namibia	1:54.09	
38	4	Philip Rotich	Kenya	1:54.12	
39	4	Sylvester Simelane	Swaziland	1:54.22	
40	8	Lameck King	Botswana	1:54.56	
41	3	Jean-Paul Niyonsaba	Burundi	1:55.50	
42	7	Luis Romero	Peru	1:55.72	
43	5	Choge Kipsang	Kenya	1:55.92	
44	4	Kabemba Mwape	Zambia	1:56.08	
45	3	Junior Anguyo	Uganda	1:56.20	
46	8	Carlos Sequeira	Nicaragua	1:56.36	
47	5	Christophe Irumwa	Rwanda	1:56.58	
48	4	Jeremy Deere	Canada	1:56.97	
49	6	Chris Musenze	Uganda	1:57.01	
50	4	Fadi Hatamleh	Jordan	1:57.43	
51	6	Omar Khalaf	Jordan	1:57.87	
52	2	Gerald Grech	Malta	1:59.29	
53	2	Ma Wai Hou	Macau	1:59.31	
54	8	Tang Win Kin	Hong Kong	2:03.08	
55	3	Md Safiqul Islam	Bangladesh	2:03.90	
56	3	Gordon Kapak	Papua New Guinea	2:09.76	
57	7	Tam Hoi Keng	Macau	2:10.02	
	1	Noor Aslam	Pakistan	DNF	
	3	Modise Bakupi	Botswana	DNF	

=== Semifinals ===
Held on 30 August

Rank	Heat	Athlete	Nationality	Time	Notes
1	2	Hezekiél Sepeng	South Africa	1:47.35	Q
2	1	Balázs Tölgyesi	Hungary	1:47.42	Q
3	2	Bryan Woodward	United States	1:47.45	Q
4	1	Shaun Benefield	United States	1:47.60	Q
5	1	Sergey Kozhevnikov	Russia	1:47.63	q
6	2	Djabir Saïd-Guerni	Algeria	1:47.71	q
7	2	Panagiotis Stroumbakos	Greece	1:47.73	
8	1	Andy Hart	Great Britain	1:47.74	
9	1	Nico Motchebon	Germany	1:47.83	
10	2	Jean-Gilles Talin	France	1:48.44	
11	1	Duarte Ponte	Portugal	1:48.81	
11	3	Norberto Téllez	Cuba	1:48.81	Q
13	3	Oleg Stepanov	Russia	1:48.87	Q
14	3	Miklós Árpási	Hungary	1:48.92	
15	3	Gert-Jan Liefers	Netherlands	1:49.03	
16	1	Paul Byrne	Australia	1:49.24	
17	3	Mark Sesay	Great Britain	1:49.70	
18	3	Tim Rogge	Belgium	1:50.19	
19	2	Roman Oravec	Czech Republic	1:50.38	
20	1	Eyvind Solbu	Norway	1:50.56	
21	2	Daryl Fillion	Canada	1:50.60	
22	2	Celso Ficagna	Brazil	1:50.88	
23	3	Bjørn Arild Bøhleng	Norway	1:50.93	
24	3	Barnaby Shone	South Africa	1:52.32	

=== Final ===
Held on 30 August

Rank	Athlete	Nationality	Time	Notes
1st place, gold medalist(s)	Norberto Téllez	Cuba	1:47.63	
2nd place, silver medalist(s)	Hezekiél Sepeng	South Africa	1:47.77	
3rd place, bronze medalist(s)	Bryan Woodward	United States	1:48.43	
4	Shaun Benefield	United States	1:48.65	
5	Balázs Tölgyesi	Hungary	1:49.13	
6	Djabir Saïd-Guerni	Algeria	1:49.41	
7	Sergey Kozhevnikov	Russia	1:49.51	
8	Oleg Stepanov	Russia	1:50.74	
