= 1990 World Junior Championships in Athletics – Men's 1500 metres =

The men's 1500 metres event at the 1990 World Junior Championships in Athletics was held in Plovdiv, Bulgaria, at Deveti Septemvri Stadium on 11 and 12 August.

== Medalists ==
Gold	Moses Kiptanui; Kenya
Silver	Alemayehu Roba; Ethiopia
Bronze	Desta Asgedom; Ethiopia

== Results ==
=== Final ===
12 August

Rank	Name	Nationality	Time	Notes
1st place, gold medalist(s)	Moses Kiptanui	Kenya	3:38.32	
2nd place, silver medalist(s)	Alemayehu Roba	Ethiopia	3:41.71	
3rd place, bronze medalist(s)	Desta Asgedom	Ethiopia	3:43.38	
4	Mirco Döring	East Germany	3:43.97	
5	Denes Balázs	Hungary	3:44.30	
6	Andrey Loginov	Soviet Union	3:44.79	
7	Nigel Adkin	Australia	3:45.07	
8	Jason Bunston	Canada	3:45.09	
9	Cleophas Bitok	Kenya	3:45.50	
10	Pantelis Kolokas	Greece	3:45.70	
11	Eddie Crowe	New Zealand	3:46.27	
12	Luís Miguel Martín	Spain	3:49.71	
13	Heiko Schulze	East Germany	3:50.57	
14	Claus Wittekind	West Germany	3:50.71	
15	Graham Hood	Canada	3:50.72	

=== Heats ===
11 August

==== Heat 1 ====
Rank	Name	Nationality	Time	Notes
1	Alemayehu Roba	Ethiopia	3:51.12	Q
2	Andrey Loginov	Soviet Union	3:51.41	Q
3	Cleophas Bitok	Kenya	3:51.83	Q
4	Jason Bunston	Canada	3:52.03	Q
5	Marc Dauer	West Germany	3:52.80	
6	Nigel Brunton	Ireland	3:52.98	
7	Steve Green	United Kingdom	3:53.84	
8	Timo Sarlin	Finland	3:54.01	
9	Kim Soon-Hyung	South Korea	3:54.15	
10	Andrzej Jakubiec	Poland	3:54.60	
11	Zhou Chaohui	China	3:56.56	
12	Ryad Gatte	Algeria	3:57.33	
13	Georgios Loucaides	Cyprus	4:01.31	
14	Nesamani Subramaniam	Singapore	4:10.24	

==== Heat 2 ====
Rank	Name	Nationality	Time	Notes
1	Moses Kiptanui	Kenya	3:41.06	Q
2	Desta Asgedom	Ethiopia	3:46.20	Q
3	Mirco Döring	East Germany	3:48.22	Q
4	Luís Miguel Martín	Spain	3:48.97	Q
5	Curtis Robb	United Kingdom	3:49.67	
6	Sergey Samoylov	Soviet Union	3:49.81	
7	Krasimir Blagoyev	Bulgaria	3:50.17	
8	João Cuñha	Portugal	3:50.49	
9	Mohamed Abdulkadir	Somalia	3:51.89	
10	Amir Mhando	Tanzania	3:52.31	
11	Jaroslaw Sitarz	Poland	3:59.16	
12	Kealin Hannigan	Australia	4:03.39	
13	Marko Koers	Netherlands	4:15.37	

==== Heat 3 ====
Rank	Name	Nationality	Time	Notes
1	Graham Hood	Canada	3:46.35	Q
2	Pantelis Kolokas	Greece	3:46.57	Q
3	Heiko Schulze	East Germany	3:46.93	Q
4	Denes Balázs	Hungary	3:46.98	Q
5	Eddie Crowe	New Zealand	3:46.99	q
6	Nigel Adkin	Australia	3:47.08	q
7	Claus Wittekind	West Germany	3:47.79	q
8	Niall Bruton	Ireland	3:47.87	
9	Svetlin Prodanov	Bulgaria	3:52.63	
10	Brian Murphy	United States	3:53.37	
11	Mario Figueirêdo	Portugal	3:54.58	
12	Mateo Cañellas	Spain	3:55.57	
13	Hiroyuki Nakamura	Japan	3:58.73	

== Participation ==
According to an unofficial count, 40 athletes from 27 countries participated in the event.

- Algeria (1)
- Australia (2)
- Bulgaria (2)
- Canada (2)
- China (1)
- Cyprus (1)
- East Germany (2)
- Ethiopia (2)
- Finland (1)
- Greece (1)
- Hungary (1)
- Ireland (2)
- Japan (1)
- Kenya (2)
- Netherlands (1)
- New Zealand (1)
- Poland (2)
- Portugal (2)
- Singapore (1)
- Somalia (1)
- South Korea (1)
- Soviet Union (2)
- Spain (2)
- Tanzania (1)
- United Kingdom (2)
- United States (1)
- West Germany (2)
