= Atle Douglas =

Norwegian middle-distance runner

Atle Thorold Lancelot Douglas (born 9 June 1968) is a retired middle-distance runner who specialized in the 800 metres. Born in England, he represented Norway internationally, most notably at two Olympic Games, two World Championships and two European Championships. He also ran 400 metres on a national level. An eleven-time national champion, seven in the 800 and four in the 400, Atle Douglas was also the Norwegian 800 metres record holder from 1992 to 1994.

== 800 metres career ==
He finished eighth at the 1994 European Championships. He also competed at the 1990 European Championships, the 1992 and 1996 Summer Olympics as well as the World Championships in 1993 and 1995 without reaching the finals. He finished fifth at the 1995 World Athletics Final. He became Norwegian champion in the years 1987–1990, 1993, 1995 and 1998.

When Atle Douglas won his first national title in 1987, the event saw its fifteenth different winner in a row. Douglas however established himself as the leading , winning every time until he missed the 1991 Norwegian Championships to complications from an injury. In 1992, Douglas was beaten by the emerging Vebjørn Rodal to take silver at the nationals, but Douglas bounced back to beat Rodal and Tor Øivind Ødegaard in 1993. 1994 saw Douglas and Rodal miss out, before Douglas again prevailed over Rodal in 1995. Rodal dominated in the subsequent years, except for 1998 when Douglas took his seventh national 800 metres title and his eleventh overall (individually). Douglas' last medal was bronze in 2000.

The Norwegian record in the men's 800 metres was one of the longest-standing in that country, having been set by Audun Boysen who achieved 1:45.9 in 1955. It was finally broken by Atle Douglas at the 1992 Bislett Games, as he ran in 1:45.15. The next year, Douglas improved the record twice; first to 1:44.88 at Marienlyst stadion and then 1:44.74 at the 1993 Norwegian Championships in Tønsberg. This achievement netted Douglas the King's Cup, a trophy for the best overall performance at the nationals. However, the Norwegian record was broken by Vebjørn Rodal eleven months later.

Still, Douglas improved his personal best time. His lifetime best was 1:43.69 minutes, achieved in September 1995 in Rieti. For decades, this placed him second on the Norwegian all-time 800 metres list, only behind 1996 Olympic champion Vebjørn Rodal. In 2026, Douglas was surpassed by Tobias Grønstad.

Atle Douglas represented BFG Fana, SK Vidar, Bergen FIK, IL Gular and IL Norna-Salhus during his active career. He made the move from BFG Fana to Oslo-based club Vidar ahead of the 1992 season. The move also entailed financial and logistic support of a lengthy stay in Pasadena to train with the Santa Monica Track Club, notably with Johnny Gray. Wanting to leave Vidar ahead of the 1995 season, Douglas, trained by Paul Bruvik at the time, joined a new entity called Bergen FIK. The transfer became a legal matter with parties demanding monetary compensation. He left Bergen FIK for traditional club IL Gular in 1997, commencing a cooperation with Kjell Arve Husby, the coach of Vebjørn Rodal. The endeavor failed, however, as Douglas announced the end of the partnership in September 1997, citing that the training was too tailored to Rodal.

== Other distances ==
In the 400 metres, Atle Douglas won silver at the 1990 Norwegian Championships and later took four national titles in a row from 1992 through 1995. His personal best time was 46.66 seconds, achieved at the 1994 Norwegian Championships in Jessheim. Again, Vebjørn Rodal was slightly better, having set a Norwegian record of 46.56 two months earlier.

Atle Douglas also recorded 1:17.79 in the 600 metres (indoor), enough to make the all-time top 10 in Norway, but exactly 2.5 seconds behind Rodal. Unlike many 800-metre runners, Atle Douglas never ran the 1500 metres or mile.

== Personal life ==
He was born in Oxford, England as a son of a Jamaican-born father and Norwegian mother from Landås, Bergen. The family, with five children, moved to Norway when Atle Douglas was sixteen. His younger brother Quincy Douglas emerged as a national champion in the late 1990s, specializing in the 400 metres. The first time Quincy became Norwegian champion, in 1997, he edged out Atle who took the silver.

Douglas received a Norwegian passport ahead of the 1990 European Championships. On Christmas Eve 1990, Atle Douglas was involved in a car crash in Oxford, resulting in hospitalization. Driving the car, he hit a wall, broke both cheekbones and had to eat through a straw.

In July 1992, Douglas was indicted for drug trafficking, as he had allegedly received 400 units of LSD in a postal package from England, helping another person to use the mailbox for that purpose. As the case went to trial in Bergen City Court in January 1993, Douglas pled not guilty to drug trafficking, but guilty to cannabis consumption. He was found guilty on both counts, but most of the sentence was suspended. The next year, he undertook compulsory military service at Haakonsvern.

By 2001, Atle Douglas had officially ended his international athletics career, winding down his training somewhat to have time for computer studies.
