= Tim Rogge =

Belgian middle-distance runner

Personal information
- Born: 3 February 1977 (age 49) Oudenaarde, Belgium

Sport
- Sport: Athletics
- Event: 800 metres
- Club: RC Gent; AV Lokeren

Tim Rogge (born 3 February 1977) is a Belgian retired middle-distance runner who specialised in the 800 metres. He represented his country at the 1997 World Championships without advancing from the first round.

== International competitions ==
| Year | Competition | Venue | Position | Event | Notes |
Representing Belgium
| 1995 | European Junior Championships | Nyíregyháza, Hungary | 5th (sf) | 800 m | 1:49.57 |
| 1996 | European Indoor Championships | Stockholm, Sweden | 12th (h) | 800 m | 1:51.69 |
| 1996 | World Junior Championships | Sydney, Australia | 12th (sf) | 800 m | 1:49.46 |
| 1997 | European U23 Championships | Turku, Finland | 4th | 800 m | 1:47.77 |
| 1997 | World Championships | Athens, Greece | 34th (h) | 800 m | 1:48.38 |
| 1997 | Universiade | Catania, Italy | 18th (sf) | 800 m | 1:50.19 |
| 1998 | European Indoor Championships | Valencia, Spain | 11th (h) | 800 m | 1:50.24 |
| 1999 | European U23 Championships | Gothenburg, Sweden | 20th (h) | 800 m | 1:50.64 |

== Personal bests ==
Outdoor

- 400 metres – 49.23 (Oordegem 2005)
- 800 metres – 1:46.07 (Hechtel 1997)
- 1000 metres – 2:22.56 (Heverlee 2001)
- 1500 metres – 3:51.30 (Oordegem 2006)

Indoor

- 800 metres – 1:48.03 (Ghent 1998)
- 1500 metres – 4:01.74 (Ghent 2008)
