= Michael Wildner =

Austrian middle-distance runner

Michael Wildner (born 24 April 1970) is a retired Austrian middle-distance runner who competed primarily in the 800 metres. He represented his country at two outdoor and two indoor World Championships. His best placing was the fourth place at the 1996 European Indoor Championships.

His personal bests in the event are 1:46.21 outdoors (Ingolstadt 1992) and 1:47.03 indoors (Karlsruhe 1994). The former is the standing national record.

== Competition record ==
Year	Competition	Venue	Position	Event	Notes
Representing Austria
1989	European Junior Championships	Varaždin, Yugoslavia	16th (sf)	800 m	1:54.99
1993	World Indoor Championships	Toronto, Canada	21st (h)	800 m	1:51.59
1994	European Indoor Championships	Paris, France	11th (sf)	800 m	1:50.49
1995	World Indoor Championships	Barcelona, Spain	12th (h)	800 m	1:50.52
1995	World Championships	Gothenburg, Sweden	43rd (h)	800 m	1:57.48
1996	European Indoor Championships	Stockholm, Sweden	4th	800 m	1:48.64
1997	World Championships	Athens, Greece	28th (h)	800 m	1:47.77
1998	European Indoor Championships	Valencia, Spain	18th (h)	800 m	1:50.94
