= Nico Motchebon =

German middle-distance runner

Personal information
- Born: 13 November 1969 (age 56) Berlin, Germany

Sport
- Sport: Track and field
Medal record
Representing Germany
World Indoor Championships
Bronze medal – third place	1993 Toronto	800 m
Bronze medal – third place	1999 Maebashi	800 m
Summer Universiade
Bronze medal – third place	1993 Buffalo	800 m

Nico Motchebon (born 13 November 1969 in Berlin) is a former German 800 metres runner.

His personal best of 1:43.91 was set on 31 July 1996 in the 800 m final of the 1996 Summer Olympics in Atlanta, where he finished fifth. Motchebon won bronze medals at the 1993 and 1999 IAAF World Indoor Championships. He also set a temporary European indoor record over 800 m in 1995. His 600 m indoor personal best stood as the indoor 600 m world record from 1999 until 2017.

Before turning to athletics in late 1992, he competed in the modern pentathlon. He even qualified for the 1992 Summer Olympics but ultimately he did not participate.

He is of Cameroonian descent through his father.

== International competitions ==
Year	Competition	Venue	Position	Event	Notes
Representing Germany
1993	World Indoor Championships	Toronto, Canada	3rd	800 m	1:48.15
1993	Universiade	Buffalo, United States	3rd	800 m	1:49.52
1993	World Championships	Stuttgart, Germany	20th (sf)	800 m	1:46.58
1994	European Indoor Championships	Paris, France	4th	800 m	1:47.24
1994	European Championships	Helsinki, Finland	4th	800 m	1:46.65
1994	World Cup	London, United Kingdom	5th	800 m	1:47.67
1995	World Championships	Gothenburg, Sweden	4th	800 m	1:45.97
1996	Olympic Games	Atlanta, United States	5th	800 m	1:43.91
1997	World Indoor Championships	Paris, France	4th	800 m	1:46.19
1997	Universiade	Catania, Italy	9th (sf)	800 m	1:47.83
1998	European Championships	Budapest, Hungary	10th (sf)	800 m	1:48.19
1999	World Indoor Championships	Maebashi, Japan	3rd	800 m	1:45.74
1999	World Championships	Seville, Spain	15th (sf)	800 m	1:47.17

== Personal bests ==
- 100 metres - 11.11 sec - 14 September 1993 in Berlin, Germany
- 400 metres - 46.71 sec - 31 May 1997 in Athens, Greece
- 600 metres - 1:15.31 min - 3 September 1997 in Dortmund, Germany
- 800 metres - 1:43.91 min - 31 July 1996 in Atlanta, United States
- 1000 metres - 2:20.47 min - 3 June 1994 in Jena, Germany
- 1500 metres - 3:52.45 min - 5 September 1995 in Rieti, Italy

Indoor

- 400 m - 46.83 sec - 18 January 1999 in Chemnitz, Germany
- 600 m - 1:15.12 min - 28 February 1999 in Sindelfingen, Germany
- 800 m - 1:44.88 min - 5 February 1995 in Stuttgart, Germany
