= Bruno Konczylo =

French middle-distance runner

Personal information
- Born: 26 August 1968 (age 57) Châteaudun, France
- Height: 1.82 m (6 ft 0 in)
- Weight: 72 kg (159 lb)

Sport
- Country: France
- Sport: Athletics
- Event: 800 metres
- Club: OC Châteaudun Bonneval

Bruno Konczylo (born 26 August 1968 in Châteaudun) is a retired French middle-distance runner who competed primarily in the 800 metres. He represented his country at the 1996 Summer Olympics, as well as the 1995 World Championships, reaching the semifinals on both occasions.

His personal bests in the event are 1:45.02 outdoors (Zürich 1995) and 1:47.66 indoors (Paris 1994).

== Competition record ==
Year	Competition	Venue	Position	Event	Notes
Representing France
1994	European Indoor Championships	Paris, France	6th	800 m	2:00.33
1994	European Championships	Helsinki, Finland	7th (sf)	800 m	1:46.63
1995	World Championships	Gothenburg, Sweden	5th (sf)	800 m	1:48.05
1996	Olympic Games	Atlanta, United States	18th (sf)	800 m	1:48.02
