= José Arconada =

Spanish middle-distance runner

Personal information
- Born: 18 January 1964 (age 62) Gijón, Spain
- Height: 1.92 m (6 ft 4 in)
- Weight: 76 kg (168 lb)

Sport
- Sport: Track and field
- Event: 800 metres
- Club: Federación de Atletismo del Principado de Asturias

José Arconada Ramos (born 18 January 1964, in Gijón) is a retired Spanish middle-distance runner who competed primarily in the 800 metres. He represented his country at the 1992 Summer Olympics and the 1995 World Championships. He won the silver medal at the 1992 European Indoor Championships.

His personal bests in the event are 1:45.02 outdoor (Seville 1990) and 1:47.16 indoors (Genoa 1992).

== Competition record ==
Year	Competition	Venue	Position	Event	Notes
Representing Spain
1988	European Indoor Championships	Budapest, Hungary	12th (h)	800 m	1:53.49
1988	Ibero-American Championships	Mexico City, Mexico	7th	800 m	1:56.44
1989	European Indoor Championships	The Hague, Netherlands	4th (sf)	800 m	1:50.25
1990	European Indoor Championships	Glasgow, United Kingdom	4th	800 m	1:47.40
1990	European Championships	Split, Yugoslavia	17th (h)	800 m	1:50.24
1992	European Indoor Championships	Genoa, Italy	2nd	800 m	1:47.16
1992	Olympic Games	Barcelona, Spain	32nd (h)	800 m	1:49.23
1993	Mediterranean Games	Narbonne, France	4th	800 m	1:49.63
1994	European Indoor Championships	Paris, France	9th (h)	800 m	1:49.39
1995	World Indoor Championships	Barcelona, Spain	10th (sf)	800 m	1:50.98
1995	World Championships	Gothenburg, Sweden	19th (h)	800 m	1:47.70
