= Torbjörn Johansson =

Swedish middle-distance runner

Torbjörn Johansson (born 23 January 1970) is a retired Swedish middle-distance runner who competed primarily in the 800 metres. He represented his country at the 1995 IAAF World Indoor Championships and 1995 World Championships.

His personal bests in the event are 1:46.25 outdoors (Helsinki 1994) and 1:47.37 indoors (Stockholm 1995).

== Competition record ==
Year	Competition	Venue	Position	Event	Notes
Representing Sweden
1989	European Junior Championships	Varaždin, Yugoslavia	11th (sf)	800 m	1:53.46
1994	European Indoor Championships	Paris, France	5th	800 m	1:47.42
1994	European Championships	Helsinki, Finland	6th (sf)	800 m	1:46.25
1995	World Indoor Championships	Barcelona, Spain	8th (sf)	800 m	1:50.19
1995	World Championships	Gothenburg, Sweden	26th (h)	800 m	1:48.31
1996	European Indoor Championships	Stockholm, Sweden	14th (h)	800 m	1:52.52
