= Craig Winrow =

English runner (born 1971)

Personal information
- Born: 22 December 1971 (age 54) Ormskirk, West Lancashire, England
- Height: 1.79 m (5 ft 10 in)
- Weight: 71 kg (157 lb)

Sport
- Sport: Athletics
- Event: 800 m
- Club: Wigan Harriers

Craig Nicholas Winrow (born 22 December 1971 in Ormskirk) is an English male retired middle-distance runner competing primarily in the 800 metres.

== Early life ==
Winrow was educated at Burscough Priory High School in Burscough, Lancashire. As a 14 year old student in 1986, he "shattered" the Lancashire Schools' County Athletics Championships in the 800 metres (2,600 ft) event, finishing with a time of 2 minutes and 1.3 seconds, beating the previous best by 3 seconds. At the age of 15, he was running 400 metres (1,300 ft) in 49 seconds and 800 metres (2,600 ft) in 1 minute 51.8 seconds, which was almost level with the UK age-best for his age group. By the age of 16, he was being sponsored by local computer firm Southport Hi-Tech, where he planned to join on a youth training scheme after leaving school. As a young athlete, he looked up to Steve Ovett and was aiming to compete in the 1992 Summer Olympics. In 1987, he was described by The Guardian as being "the most exciting 800-metre prospect in Britain since the schooldays of Cram and Coe." Success in athletics came relatively early during his school days, having originally been a sprinter and was described as having "the heritage of a sprint finish that has subsequently devastated his peers".

== Athletics career ==
In the summer of 1989, he was the winner of the 1989 European Athletics Junior Championships 800-metre event in Varaždin, Yugoslavia, having initially trailed but overtook everyone on the final lap to victory. He loved running and was known to tell others what they were missing, suggesting that if he wasn't running then he may be "working in a packing factory or something."

Winrow became the British 800 metres champion after winning the British AAA Championships title at the 1994 AAA Championships.

He represented England in the 800 metres event at the 1994 Commonwealth Games in Victoria, British Columbia, Canada. He represented Great Britain at the 1996 Summer Olympics reaching the semifinals.

His personal bests in the event are 1:45.23 outdoors (Rome 1996) and 1:47.78 indoors (Glasgow 1994).

== Coaching ==
Nowadays he works as a coach. He has trained, among others, Joe Wigfield, Andrew Osagie and Adelle Tracey.

== Competition record ==
Year	Competition	Venue	Position	Event	Notes
Representing Great Britain and England
1989	European Junior Championships	Varaždin, Yugoslavia	1st	800 m	1:50.01
1989	European Junior Championships	Varaždin, Yugoslavia	6th	4x400 m relay	3:12.61
1990	World Junior Championships	Plovdiv, Bulgaria	2nd	4x400 m relay	3:03.80
1994	European Indoor Championships	Paris, France	14th (h)	800 m	1:49.88
1994	European Championships	Helsinki, Finland	6th	800 m	1:47.09
1994	Commonwealth Games	Victoria, Canada	4th	800 m	1:46.91
1994	World Cup	London, United Kingdom	3rd	800 m	1:47.16
1996	Olympic Games	Atlanta, United States	21st (sf)	800 m	1:48.57
