= Ivan Komar =

Belarusian middle-distance runner

Ivan Komar (Belarusian: Іван Комар; born 18 March 1970) is a retired Belarusian middle-distance runner who competed primarily in the 800 metres. He represented his country at three consecutive World Championships starting in 1993.

== Competition record ==
Year	Competition	Venue	Position	Event	Notes
Representing Belarus
1993	World Championships	Stuttgart, Germany	12th (sf)	800 m	1:45.76
1994	European Championships	Helsinki, Finland	17th (h)	800 m	1:48.78
1995	World Championships	Gothenburg, Sweden	41st (h)	800 m	1:51.36
1997	World Championships	Athens, Greece	31st (qf)	800 m	1:50.17
1998	European Indoor Championships	Valencia, Spain	6th	800 m	1:50.94
1998	European Championships	Budapest, Hungary	9th (sf)	800 m	1:48.14

== Personal bests ==
Outdoor

- 600 metres – 1:17.69 (Bielsko-Biała 2002)
- 800 metres – 1:45.63 (Sopot 1999)
- 1000 metres – 2:19.22 (Stockholm 1999)

Indoor

- 600 metres – 1:16.76 (1998) NR
- 800 metres – 1:47.18 (Sindelfingen 1998)
- 1000 metres – 2:19.27 (Erfurt 1999) NR
- 1500 metres – 3:43.67 (Moscow 1998)
