= Tor Øivind Ødegård =

Norwegian middle distance runner

Tor Øivind Ødegård (born 28 February 1969) is a retired Norwegian middle distance runner who specialized in the 800 metres. He represented Fredrikstad IF and IF Minerva.

He finished fourth at the 1995 IAAF World Indoor Championships. He also competed at the World Championships in 1997 and 1999 without reaching the finals. He became Norwegian champion in 1991 and 1994.

His personal best time is 1:45.42 minutes, achieved in August 1997 in Athens. This places him third among Norwegian 800 m runners, only behind Vebjørn Rodal and Atle Douglas.
