= Ousmane Diarra (French athlete) =

Personal information
- Born: 10 February 1964 (age 62)
- Height: 1.85 m (6 ft 1 in)
- Weight: 73 kg (161 lb)

Sport
- Sport: Track and field
- Events: 400 metres, 800 metres
Medal record
Men's athletics
Representing Senegal
African Championships
Bronze medal – third place	1985 Cairo	4×400 m
Representing France
European Indoor Championships
Bronze medal – third place	1994 Paris	800m

Ousmane Diarra (born 10 February 1964) is a retired athlete who represented Senegal and later France. He was initially a 400 metres sprinter competing at the 1988 Summer Olympics but later switched to the 800 metres. On that distance he won the bronze medal at the 1994 European Indoor Championships and the silver at the 1994 Jeux de la Francophonie.

He became French indoor champion in 1997.

== Competition record ==
Year	Competition	Venue	Position	Event	Notes
Representing Senegal
1985	African Championships	Cairo, Egypt	3rd	4 × 400 m relay	3:07.94
1987	Universiade	Zagreb, Yugoslavia	21st (h)	400 m hurdles	52.29
1988	Olympic Games	Seoul, South Korea	28th (qf)	400 m	46.23
1988	Olympic Games	Seoul, South Korea	13th (sf)	4 × 400 m relay	3:07.19
1989	Universiade	Duisburg, West Germany	28th (h)	800 m	1:53.58
Representing France
1994	European Indoor Championships	Paris, France	3rd	800 m	1:47.18, PB
1994	Jeux de la Francophonie	Bondoufle, France	2nd	800 m	1:50.79
1994	European Championships	Helsinki, Finland	24th (h)	800 m	1:49.09

== Personal bests ==
Outdoor

- 400 metres – 46.23 (Seoul 1998)
- 800 metres – 1:45.45 (Caorle 1990)

- Indoor: 1:47.18 (Paris 1994)

- 1000 metres – 2:19.66 (Villeneuve-d'Ascq 1993)
