= José Manuel Cerezo =

Spanish middle-distance runner

Personal information
- Born: 23 June 1973 (age 52) Málaga, Spain
- Height: 1.85 m (6 ft 1 in)
- Weight: 69 kg (152 lb)

Sport
- Sport: Athletics
- Event: 800 metres
- Club: Club atletismo Mijas (Actual)

José Manuel Cerezo Moreno (born 23 June 1973 in Málaga) is a Spanish former middle-distance runner who specialised in the 800 metres. He represented his country at the 2000 Summer Olympics as well as two World Championships. In addition, he reached the final at the 1994 European Championships.

== International competitions ==
Year	Competition	Venue	Position	Event	Notes
Representing Spain
1992	World Junior Championships	Seoul, South Korea	15th (sf)	800 m	1:51.23
1994	European Championships	Helsinki, Finland	7th	800 m	1:47.58
1997	World Championships	Athens, Greece	29th (qf)	800 m	1:48.90
1999	World Championships	Seville, Spain	50th (h)	800 m	1:50.08
2000	Olympic Games	Sydney, Australia	35th (h)	800 m	1:48.11

== Personal bests ==
Outdoor

- 400 metres – 48.36.02 (Getafe 1993)
- 600 metres – 1:20.62 (Andújar 2006)
- 800 metres – 1:45.31 (Zürich 2000)
- 1000 metres – 2:19.68 (Madrid 1994)
- 1500 metres – 3:37.67 (San Sebastián 2003)
- 3000 metres – 8:08.24 (Berlin 2006)

Indoor

- 800 metres – 1:49.63 (Piraeus 1998)
- 1000 metres – 2:25.05 (Madrid 1998)
- 1500 metres – 3:48.05 (Valencia 2003)
- 3000 metres – 8:08.29 (Zaragoza 2003)
