= Frédéric Cornette =

French middle-distance runner

Personal information
- Born: 29 June 1967 (age 59) Laon, France
- Height: 1.76 m (5 ft 9 in)
- Weight: 69 kg (152 lb)

Sport
- Sport: Track and field
- Event: 800 metres
- Club: AC Paris-Joinville

Frédéric Cornette (born 29 June 1967 in Laon) is a retired French middle-distance runner who competed primarily in the 800 metres. He represented his country at the 1992 Summer Olympics, as well as two World Championships, in 1991 and 1995.

His personal bests in the event are 1:45.82 outdoors (Nice 1992) and 1:48.46 indoors (Liévin 1997).

== Competition record ==
Year	Competition	Venue	Position	Event	Notes
Representing France
1989	Jeux de la Francophonie	Casablanca, Morocco	(sf)	800 m	1:48.79
1991	Mediterranean Games	Athens, Greece	4th	800 m	1:47.93
1991	World Championships	Tokyo, Japan	14th (sf)	800 m	1:48.04
1992	Olympic Games	Barcelona, Spain	24th (h)	800 m	1:48.22
1994	European Indoor Championships	Paris, France	12th (sf)	800 m	1:52.18
1994	European Championships	Helsinki, Finland	15th (sf)	800 m	1:48.49
1995	World Championships	Gothenburg, Sweden	17th (h)	800 m	1:47.36
