= Marko Koers =

Dutch middle-distance runner

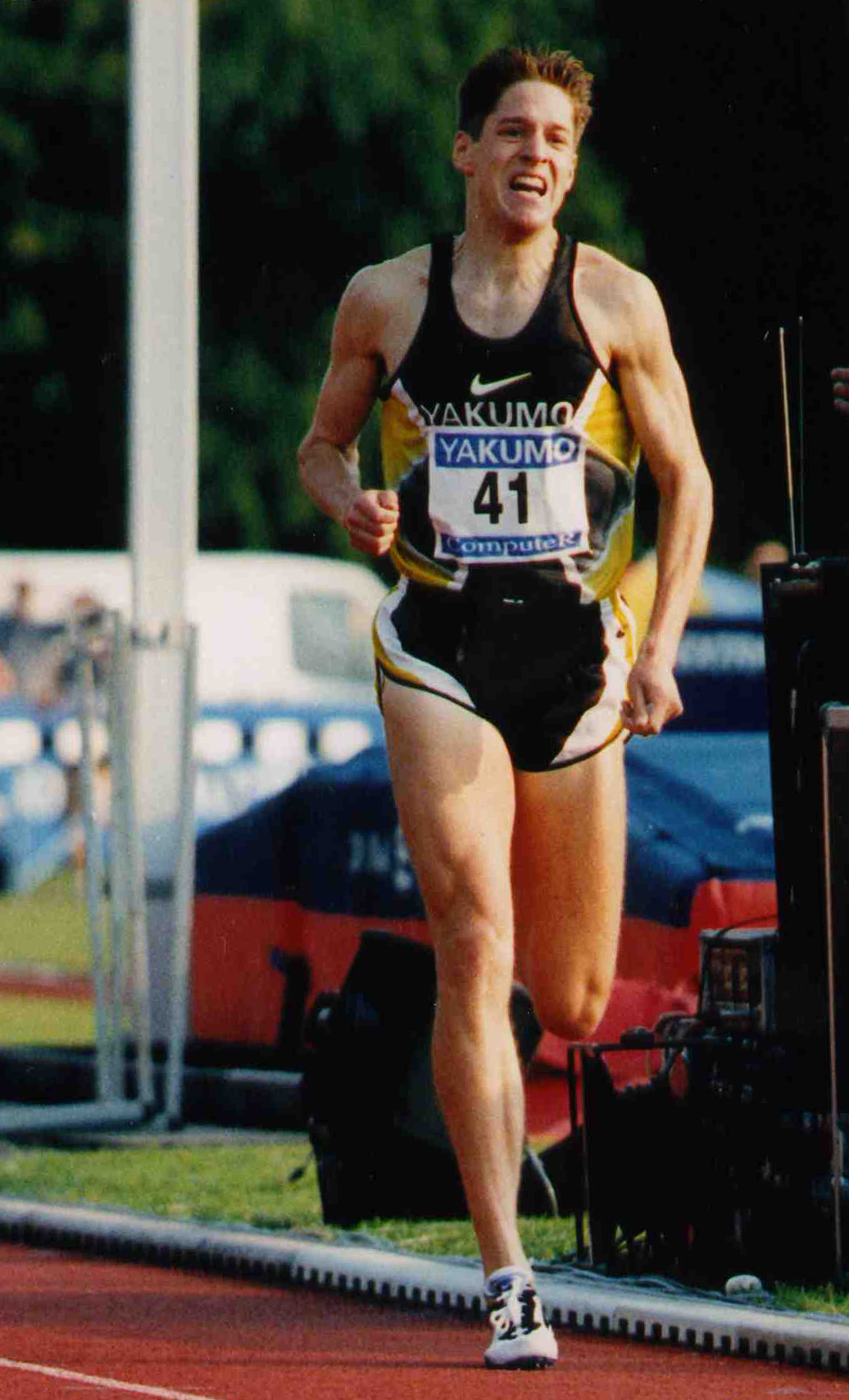
- Marko Koers at the Papendal Games in 1997

Personal information
- Born: November 3, 1972 (age 53) Molenhoek, Limburg, Netherlands

Sport
- Sport: Track and field
Medal record
Representing Netherlands
Summer Universiade
Gold medal – first place	1993 Buffalo	800 m
European Indoor Championships
Silver medal – second place	1998 Valencia	800 m

Marko Ewout Koers (born November 3, 1972) is a retired middle distance runner from the Netherlands, who represented his native country at three consecutive Summer Olympics, starting in 1992. He competed in the 800 and 1500 metres. Koers won the silver medal in the 800 metres at the 1998 European Indoor Athletics Championships, behind Germany's Nils Schumann. He won the NCAA Division I Outdoor Track and Field Championships – Men's 1,500 meter run while competing for the Illinois Fighting Illini.

== Competition record ==
Year	Competition	Venue	Position	Event	Notes
Representing the Netherlands
1990	World Junior Championships	Plovdiv, Bulgaria	40th (h)	1500 m	4:15.37
1991	European Junior Championships	Thessaloniki, Greece	12th (sf)	800 m	1:50.68
1992	Olympic Games	Barcelona, Spain	23rd (sf)	800 m	1:52.23
1993	Universiade	Buffalo, United States	1st	800 m	1:48.57
1993	World Championships	Stuttgart, Germany	14th (sf)	800 m	1:45.90
1994	European Championships	Helsinki, Finland	13th (sf)	800m	1:47.52
1995	World Championships	Gothenburg, Sweden	12th (h)	800 m	1:44.85
1996	Olympic Games	Atlanta, United States	7th	1500 m	3:38.18
1997	World Indoor Championships	Paris, France	5th	800 m	1:46.43
1997	World Championships	Athens, Greece	6th	800 m	1:44.85
1998	European Indoor Championships	Valencia, Spain	2nd	800 m	1:47.20
1999	World Championships	Seville, Spain	19th (sf)	1500 m	3:40.15
2000	European Indoor Championships	Ghent, Belgium	4th	1500 m	3:42.46
2000	Olympic Games	Sydney, Australia	9th (sf)	1500 m	3:39.42
2001	World Indoor Championships	Lisbon, Portugal	14th (h)	1500 m	3:43.17
2002	European Championships	Munich, Germany	8th	1500 m	3:46.68
2004	World Indoor Championships	Budapest, Hungary	11th (h)	1500 m	3:42.53

Awards
Preceded by Bert van Vlaanderen	Herman van Leeuwen Cup; 1996, 1997	Succeeded by Robin Korving
