= Tommy Asinga =

Surinamese middle-distance runner (born 1968)

Personal information
- Born: 20 November 1968 (age 57) Moengo, Suriname
- Height: 1.88 m (6 ft 2 in)
- Weight: 71 kg (157 lb)
Medal record
Men's Athletics
Representing Suriname
Pan American Games
Bronze medal – third place	1991 Havana	800 m

Tommy Asinga (born 20 November 1968) is a former track and field athlete from Suriname.

Asinga trained in the United States, attending Eastern Michigan University from 1991 to 1994, where he won All-American honors five times.

Asinga competed at three Olympic Games, representing Suriname: in 1988 at Seoul, in 1992 at Barcelona (where he was Suriname's flag bearer in the opening ceremonies) and in 1996 in Atlanta.

Asinga won the bronze medal in the 800 metres at the 1991 Pan American Games in Havana, Cuba. That same year, he also took the silver medal 800 metres run at the 1991 NCAA Outdoor Championships. Asinga placed sixth in the 1992 NCAA Indoor Championships. In 1993, Asinga was the anchor leg on the winning Eastern Michigan University team for the 4 × 800 meter relay at the NCAA Division I Indoor Track and Field Championships. Asinga also won the silver medal in the Mid-American Conference outdoor 400 metres in three consecutive years in 1992, 1993 and 1994.

After graduating from Eastern Michigan University, Asinga went to Tuskegee University's School of Veterinary Medicine, and is now a practicing veterinarian in Lusaka, Zambia. He is the husband of Zambian former sprinter Ngozi Mwanamwambwa and the father of Surinamese sprinter Issam Asinga.

== International competitions ==
Year	Competition	Venue	Position	Event	Notes
Representing Suriname
1988	Olympic Games	Seoul, South Korea	–	800 m	DQ
1991	Universiade	Sheffield, United Kingdom	8th	800 m	1:48.14
1991	Universiade	Sheffield, United Kingdom	23rd (h)	1500 m	3:57.42
1991	Pan American Games	Havana, Cuba	9th (h)	400 m	46.89
1991	Pan American Games	Havana, Cuba	3rd	800 m	1:47.24
1991	World Championships	Tokyo, Japan	17th (h)	800 m	1:47.33
1992	Olympic Games	Barcelona, Spain	13th (sf)	800 m	1:46.78
1993	Universiade	Buffalo, United States	7th	800 m	1:51.58
1993	Central American and Caribbean Games	Ponce, Puerto Rico	4th	800 m	1:50.60
1995	World Indoor Championships	Barcelona, Spain	18th (h)	800 m	1:51.83
1995	Pan American Games	Buenos Aires, Argentina	11th (h)	800 m	1:50.72
1995	South American Championships	Manaus, Brazil	7th	400 m	48.81
1995	South American Championships	Manaus, Brazil	4th	800 m	1:50.49
1995	World Championships	Gothenburg, Sweden	42nd (h)	800 m	1:51.60
1996	Olympic Games	Atlanta, United States	37th (h)	800 m	1:48.29

Olympic Games
Preceded by Anthony Nesty	Flagbearer for Suriname; Barcelona 1992	Succeeded by Enrico Linscheer
