= Tommaso Benvenuti (footballer) =

Sammarinese footballer

Personal information
- Date of birth: 3 February 2006 (age 20)
- Place of birth: San Marino
- Position: Left-back

Team information
- Current team: Lucchese
- Number: 3

Youth career
- –2020: San Marino Academy
- 2020–2026: Sassuolo

Senior career*
Years	Team	Apps	(Gls)
2023–2024	→ Victor San Marino (loan)	21	(0)
2026–	Lucchese	0	(0)

International career^{‡}
2022	San Marino U16	3	(0)
2021–2022	San Marino U17	6	(0)
2023–	San Marino U19	3	(0)
2023–	San Marino U21	5	(0)
2024–	San Marino	10	(0)
- * Club domestic league appearances and goals as of 5 November 2026 ‡ National team caps and goals as of 15 November 2026

Tommaso Benvenuti (born 3 February 2006) is a Sammarinese football player who plays as a left-back for the Serie D club Lucchese and the San Marino national team.

== Club career ==
A youth product of San Marino Academy, Benvenuti plays primarily as a left-back, but has also featured as a left winger. He moved to the youth academy of Sassuolo in 2020. He joined Victor San Marino on loan for the 2023–24 season in the Serie D, where he was the youngest player in the tournament alongside his twin brother, and helped the club to a surprising third place league finish as a newly promoted team. On 21 June 2024, he signed a professional two-year contract with Sassuolo.

Tommaso transferred to fourth-tier Lucchese in the summer window of 2026.

== International career ==
He played for the San Marino national under-21 football team in June 2024 as they recorded their first match win for over ten years.

Benvenuti made his debut for the senior made his debut for the San Marino national team on 5 September 2024 in a UEFA Nations League game against Liechtenstein at the San Marino Stadium. He substituted Alessandro Tosi in the 71st minute, as the game ended in 1–0 San Marino victory, which was their first ever competitive victory, and their second-ever victory overall (the first victory came 20 years earlier in a friendly against Liechtenstein).

== Personal life ==
As a youngster he cartilages in numerous sports including swimming, beach tennis, basketball and athletics. Benvenuti is the son of the Italian former 800 metres runner Andrea Benvenuti who moved to San Marino at the end of his sporting career which included a gold medal at the 1994 European Athletics Championships. Tomasso is the twin brother of the footballer Giacomo Benvenuti.
