= Bryan Woodward =

American middle-distance runner (born 1974)

Personal information
- Born: August 3, 1974 (age 52) Long Beach, California, United States

Sport
- Sport: Track and field
Medal record
Representing United States
Summer Universiade
Gold medal – first place	1995 Fukuoka	4x400m relay
Gold medal – first place	1997 Catania	4x400m relay
Bronze medal – third place	1997 Catania	800m

Bryan Woodward (born August 3, 1974) is an American former middle distance runner who competed in the 2000 Summer Olympics. He was born in Long Beach, California.

Competing for the Georgetown Hoyas track and field team, Woodward won the 1997 NCAA Division I Outdoor Track and Field Championships in the 800 metres.
