= 100 metres world record progression =

100 metres world record progression may refer to:

- Men's 100 metres world record progression
- Women's 100 metres world record progression
