= Marius van Heerden =

South African athlete (1974–2021)

Personal information
- Nationality: South African
- Born: 8 September 1974 Clanwilliam, South Africa
- Died: 22 January 2021 (aged 46) Cape Town, South Africa

Sport
- Sport: Middle-distance running
- Event: 800 metres

Marius van Heerden (8 September 1974 – 22 January 2021) was a South African middle-distance runner. He competed in the men's 800 metres at the 1996 Summer Olympics.

van Heerden died of COVID-19 during the pandemic in South Africa.
