= Andrey Loginov =

Russian former middle-distance runner (born 1972)

Andrey Loginov (born 3 March 1972 in Tiraspol, Moldovan SSR) is a Russian former middle-distance runner who specialized in the 800 and 1500 metres.

== International competitions ==
Year	Competition	Venue	Position	Event	Notes
Representing the Soviet Union
1990	World Junior Championships	Plovdiv, Bulgaria	6th	1500 m	3:44.79
1991	European Junior Championships	Thessaloniki, Greece	4th	1500 m	3:53.81
Representing Russia
1994	European Indoor Championships	Paris, France	1st	800 m	1:46.38
1994	European Championships	Helsinki, Finland	5th (sf)	800 m	1:46.18
1994	Goodwill Games	St. Petersburg, Russia	1st	800 m	1:46.65
