= Giacomo Benvenuti (footballer) =

Sammarinese footballer (born 2006)

Personal information
- Date of birth: 3 February 2006 (age 20)
- Height: 1.86 m (6 ft 1 in)
- Position: Right-back

Team information
- Current team: Santegidiese
- Number: 2

Youth career
- –2020: San Marino Academy
- 2020–2026: Sassuolo

Senior career*
Years	Team	Apps	(Gls)
2023–2024	→ Victor San Marino (loan)	19	(1)
2026	Fidelis Andria	0	(0)
2026–	Santegidiese	1	(0)

International career^{‡}
2022	San Marino U16	3	(1)
2021–2022	San Marino U17	6	(0)
2024–	San Marino U21	2	(0)
2024–	San Marino	21	(0)
- * Club domestic league appearances and goals as of 5 November 2026 ‡ National team caps and goals as of 15 November 2026

Giacomo Benvenuti (born 3 February 2006) is a Sammarinese footballer who plays as a right-back for the Serie D club Santegidiese and the San Marino national team.

== Career ==
A youth product of San Marino Academy, Benvenuti plays primarily as a right-back. He moved to the youth academy of Sassuolo in 2020. He joined Victor San Marino on loan for the 2023–24 season in the Serie D, where he was the youngest player in the tournament alongside his twin brother, and helped the club to a surprising third place league finish as a newly promoted team. On 21 June 2024, he signed a professional two-year contract with Sassuolo.

He moved to Serie D outfit Fidelis Andria in the summer of 2026, but would later transfer to fellow fourth-tier side Santegidiese in October of that year.

== International career ==
He played for the San Marino national under-21 football team in June 2024 as they recorded their first match win for over ten years.

Benvenuti made his debut for the senior San Marino national team on 5 September 2024, starting the match in a Nations League game against Liechtenstein at the San Marino Stadium. He played the whole 90 minutes of the game as it ended in 1–0 San Marino victory, which was their first ever competitive victory, and their second-ever victory overall (the first victory came 20 years earlier in a friendly against Liechtenstein) and assisted the game-winning goal scored by Nicko Sensoli. Neither player had yet even been born on the occasion of San Marino's one previous match victory 20 years previously.

== Personal life ==
Benvenuti is the son of the Italian former 800 metres runner Andrea Benvenuti who moved to San Marino at the end of his sporting career, and his wife Elena Vagnini, also a former runner. At 12 years-of-age, Giacomo ran the 1000 meters in 3.01 minutes. Giacomo is the twin brother footballer of Tommaso Benvenuti.
