= Brandon Rock =

American middle-distance runner

Brandon Rock (born July 8, 1972, in Chambersburg, Pennsylvania) is an American former middle-distance runner who specialized in the 800 meters.

He finished fifth at the 1995 World Championships in Athletics in Gothenburg and ran the 800 meters for the US at the 1996 Summer Olympics.

His personal best 800 m time was 1:44.64 minutes, achieved in June 1996 in Atlanta.

Rock ran collegiately for the University of Arkansas, the University of Nevada and Taft Junior College. He won the 800 meter event at the 1995 NCAA Outdoor Championships and at the 1995 USATF Nationals as well.

== Rankings ==
Rock was ranked among the best in the world and the US in his event from 1995 to 1997, according to Track and Field News.

Year	Event	World rank	US rank
1995	800 meters	9th	1st
1996	800 meters	-	2nd
1997	800 meters	-	3rd
