= Artyom Mastrov =

Russian middle-distance runner

Personal information
- Full name: Artyom Vasilyevich Mastrov
- Nationality: Russian
- Born: 12 November 1976 (age 50) Kazan, Soviet Union

Sport
- Sport: Middle-distance running
- Event: 800 metres

Artyom Vasilyevich Mastrov (born 12 November 1976) is a Russian middle-distance runner. He competed in the men's 800 metres at the 2000 Summer Olympics.
