= Benson Koech =

Kenyan middle-distance runner

Benson Koech (born November 10, 1974) is a Kenyan middle-distance runner best known for his achievements as a young athlete. He won the gold medal at the 1992 World Junior Championships over 800m in a time of 1:44.77 min. He also won a silver medal over 800m at the 1995 IAAF World Indoor Championships. Koech set his personal best at 1:43.17 min (ranked No.1 in the world 1994) in Rieti. He retired after the 2001 season.

His younger brother, Jackson Koech, is also a prominent runner.
