= Alemayehu Roba =

Ethiopian middle-distance runner

Alemayehu Roba (born 27 October 1972) is a retired Ethiopian middle distance runner who specialized in the 1500 metres.

He won a silver medal at the 1990 World Junior Championships and a bronze medal at the 1991 All-Africa Games. He competed at the 1991 World Championships, but did not progress from the qualification round.
