= Einārs Tupurītis =

Latvian middle-distance runner

Personal information
- Born: 9 December 1973 (age 52) Smiltene, Soviet Union

Sport
- Sport: Track and field

Einārs Tupurītis (born 9 December 1973) is a retired Latvian middle-distance runner who specialized in the 800 metres. He competed in college for Wichita State University.

He finished sixth at the 1997 IAAF World Indoor Championships in Paris. He also competed at the World Championships in 1995 and 1997 as well as the 1996 Summer Olympics without reaching the final.

His personal best time over 800 m is 1:43.90 minutes, achieved in July 1996 in Durham. This is the ex Latvian record. The current Latvian 800m record (1:43.67) holds Dmitrijs Miļkevičs. Tupuritis also co-holds the national record in 4 x 400 metres relay, with 3:04,30 minutes from the 1997 World Championships.
