= Davide Cadoni =

Italian middle-distance runner

Personal information
- Nationality: Italian
- Born: 4 May 1973 (age 53) Cagliari
- Height: 1.83 m (6 ft 0 in)
- Weight: 80 kg (180 lb)

Sport
- Country: Italy
- Sport: Athletics
- Event: Middle-distance running

Achievements and titles
- Personal bests: 800 m: 1:45.24 (1994); 1500 m 3'41"66 (1999)

Davide Cadoni (born 4 May 1973) is an Italian male retired middle-distance runner, which participated at the 1995 World Championships in Athletics.

== Achievements ==
Year	Competition	Venue	Position	Event	Performance	Notes
1995	World Championships	(Sweden) Gothenburg	Semi	800 metres	1:53.67	
