= Andrea Giocondi =

Italian middle-distance runner

Personal information
- Nationality: Italian
- Born: January 17, 1969 (age 57) Tivoli, Italy
- Height: 1.80 m (5 ft 11 in)
- Weight: 70 kg (154 lb)

Sport
- Country: Italy
- Sport: Athletics
- Event: Middle distance running
- Club: G.S. Fiamme Gialle

Achievements and titles
- Personal bests: 800 m: 1:44.78 (1996); 1500 m: 3:38.90 (1994)
Medal record
Universiade
Silver medal – second place	1995 Fukuoka	1500 m

Andrea Giocondi (born 17 January 1969 in Tivoli) is an Italian middle distance runner who specialized in the 800 metres.

== Biography ==
He finished seventh at the 1995 World Championships in Athletics in Gothenburg, and won the silver medal at the 1995 Summer Universiade in Fukuoka. His personal best 800 m time is 1:44.78 minutes.

== Olympic results ==
Year	Competition	Venue	Position	Event	Time
1996	Olympic Games	(United States) Atlanta	Heat	800 metres	1:47.26

== National titles ==
He has won 4 national championship titles.

- 800 metres (1996, 2001)
- 800 metres indoor (1999)
- 1500 metres indoor (1996)

== See also ==
- Italian all-time lists - 800 metres
- Annalisa Minetti
