= Vebjørn Rodal =

Norwegian former middle distance athlete (born 1972)

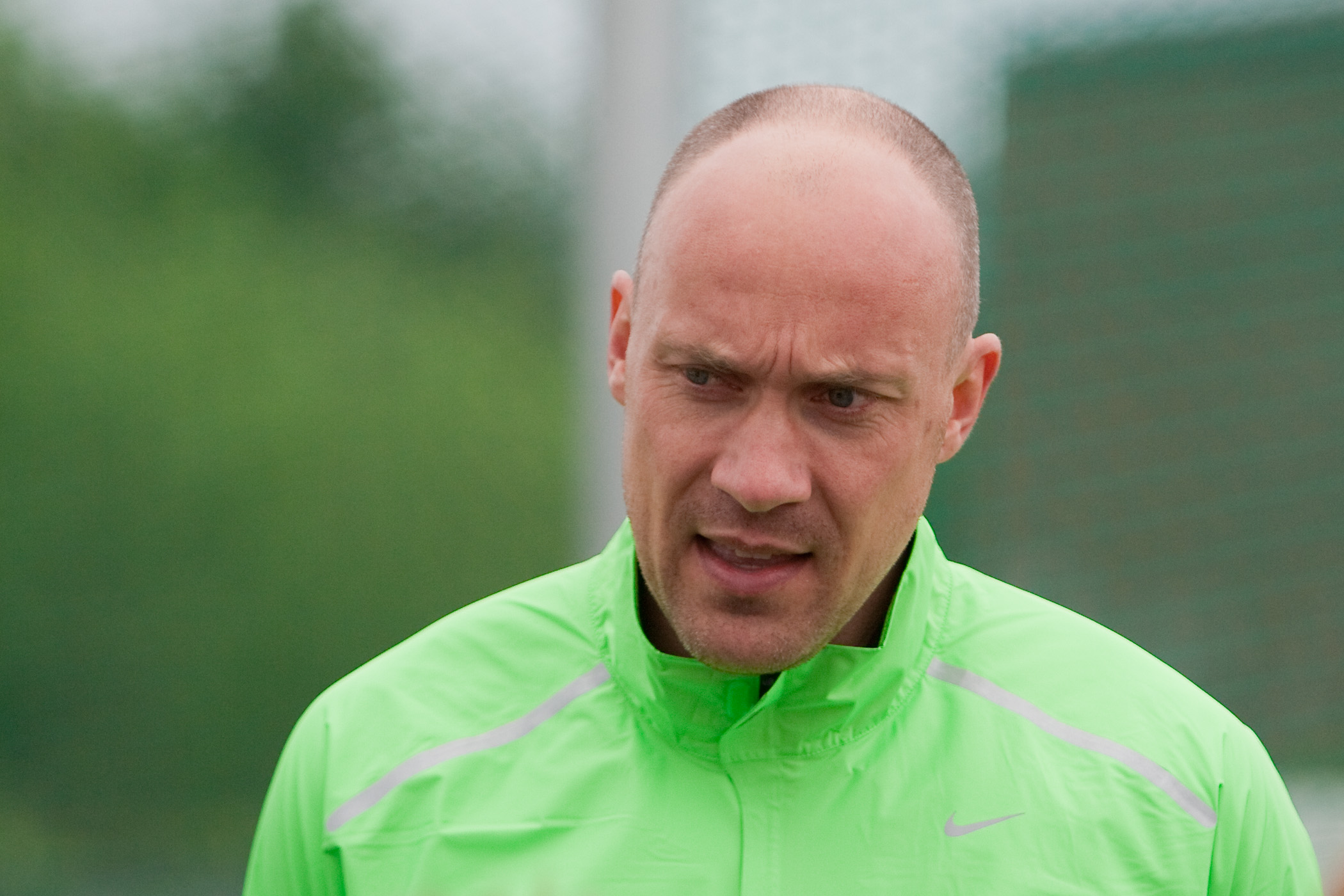
- Vebjørn Rodal in 2010

Personal information
- Nationality: Norwegian
- Born: 16 September 1972 (age 54) Berkåk in Sør-Trøndelag, Norway
- Height: 1.88 m (6 ft 2 in)

Sport
- Sport: Running
- Event: 800 meter
Medal record
Men's athletics
Representing Norway
Olympic Games
Gold medal – first place	1996 Atlanta	800 m
World Championships
Bronze medal – third place	1995 Gothenburg	800 m
European Championships
Silver medal – second place	1994 Helsinki	800 m
European Indoor Championships
Bronze medal – third place	1998 Valencia	800 m

Vebjørn Rodal (born 16 September 1972) is a Norwegian former middle distance athlete. He is an Olympic champion and won the gold medal in the 800 metres event at the 1996 Summer Olympics with the time 1:42.58. He is also a World Championships bronze medallist, European Championships silver medallist and European Indoor Championships bronze medallist in the 800 metres. Rodal is also the former Olympic record holder in the 800 m event and held the record until the 2012 Summer Olympics. Since 2010, Rodal has worked as a track and field commentator for NRK.

== Biography ==
Rodal, born and raised in Berkåk in Rennebu Municipality, made his senior international debut in 1992, at the Barcelona Olympics, reaching the semi-finals in his event, the 800 m. Part of a group of successful Norwegian athletes, he won his first international medal only two years later, placing second at the 1994 European Championships.

By finishing third in the final of the 1995 World Championships, he established himself as one of the top 800 m runners in the world, and was among the medal contenders for the 1996 Summer Olympics, held in Atlanta. Not present at the Olympics was world champion Wilson Kipketer, who had emigrated from Kenya to Denmark, but wasn't allowed to run for his new country by the Kenyans. This made the final wide open. Rodal made the final, which was run in a blistering pace. Rodal overtook most of the field in his second lap, and took the lead at the last bend, crossing the line first in a new Olympic record of 1:42.58, which stood until the 2012 Summer Olympics. With four runners under 1:43, the final was one of the fastest 800 m ever run.

After failing to qualify for the 800 m event final at the 2000 Summer Olympics in Sydney and finishing seventh in the semi-final, Rodal retired from competing internationally due to injuries and lack of motivation. He has later entered national competitions on occasion. Since 2010, Rodal has worked as a track and field commentator for NRK. From 2016 to 2019, he was a part of the coaching staff at Norwegian football club Rosenborg where he focused on the players' speed and acceleration.

== Competition record ==
Year	Competition	Venue	Position	Event	Notes
Representing Norway
1990	World Junior Championships	Plovdiv, Bulgaria	15th (sf)	800 m	1:49.94
1991	European Junior Championships	Thessaloniki, Greece	7th	800 m	1:50.62
1992	Olympic Games	Barcelona, Spain	21st (sf)	800 m	1:49.53
1993	World Championships	Stuttgart, Germany	18th (sf)	800 m	1:46.50
1994	European Championships	Helsinki, Finland	2nd	800 m	1:46.53
1995	World Championships	Gothenburg, Sweden	3rd	800 m	1:45.68
1996	Olympic Games	Atlanta, United States	1st	800 m	1:42.58
1997	World Championships	Athens, Greece	5th	800 m	1:44.53
1998	European Indoor Championships	Valencia, Spain	3rd	800 m	1:47.40
1999	World Championships	Seville, Spain	36th (h)	800 m	1:48.73
2000	Olympic Games	Sydney, Australia	22nd (sf)	800 m	1:48.73

Awards
Preceded by Bjørn Dæhlie	Norwegian Sportsperson of the Year; 1996	Succeeded by Hanne Haugland; Nils Arne Eggen
