= David Matthews (runner) =

Irish middle-distance runner

David Matthews (born 9 April 1974) is an Irish former middle-distance runner specialising in the 800 metres. He was born in Leixlip, County Kildare and attended University College, Dublin.

At his favoured distance, he won the consecutive national titles outdoors in 1994–5–6–7 and indoors in 1993–4–5, He won the bronze medal at the 1993 European Junior Championships, reached the semifinal of the 1996 Olympics and the heats of the 2000 Olympics. Matthews is the Irish record holder at 1000 m outdoors (senior and under-23).

In 2011, Matthews was appointed fitness coach of senior Cork county hurling team.

== Personal bests ==
Event	Record	Date	Meet	Place
800 m	1:44.82	5 September 1995	Rieti Meeting	Rieti, Italy
1000 m	2:17.58	9 September 1996		Sarajevo, Bosnia and Herzegovina
