= Athletics at the 2000 Summer Olympics – Men's 800 metres =

Men's 800 metres at the Games of the XXVII Olympiad
- Venue: Stadium Australia
- Date: 23 September 2000 (heats); 25 September 2000 (semi-finals); 27 September 2000 (final)
- Competitors: 61 from 42 nations
- Winning time: 1:45.08

Medalists
1st place, gold medalist(s)		Nils Schumann; Germany
2nd place, silver medalist(s)		Wilson Kipketer; Denmark
3rd place, bronze medalist(s)		Djabir Saïd-Guerni; Algeria

The men's 800 metres event at the 2000 Summer Olympics as part of the athletics programme was held at Stadium Australia on Saturday 23 September, Monday 25 September, and Wednesday 27 September 2000. Sixty-one athletes from 46 nations competed. The maximum number of athletes per nation had been set at 3 since the 1930 Olympic Congress. The event was won by 0.06 seconds by Nils Schumann of Germany, the first men's 800 metres championship for a German runner and the first medal in the event for the nation since 1952. Denmark (Wilson Kipketer's silver) and Algeria (Djabir Saïd-Guerni's bronze) each won their first medal in the men's 800 metres.

== Summary ==
Germany's Nils Schumann upset Denmark's world record holder and world champion Wilson Kipketer. The race was one of the closest in the Olympic 800 meter history as the first three were separated by a mere 0.08 second and the first five by 0.32 second. It was suggested Kipketer made a tactical error by not forcing the pace.

The final was slow, with André Bucher leading the first lap in 53.43. Down the back stretch Andrea Longo moved shoulder to shoulder with Bucher and at the 600 meter mark, just under 1:20 Longo dropped his shoulder forcing Bucher into the infield. Longo charged into the lead around the final turn with the world record holder in next to last place chasing the notable young kicker Yuriy Borzakovskiy. Kipketer had to go out to lane 4 to try to get around the wall of runners ahead of him with Djabir Saïd-Guerni in lane 5 trying to get around Kipketer. Longo faded with 30 meters to go, with Nils Schumann in perfect position to pick up the pace, holding off the late rush on the outside to take the gold. For his interference, Longo was disqualified.

== Background ==
This was the 24th appearance of the event, which is one of 12 athletic events to have been held at every Summer Olympics. Only two finalists from 1996 returned, but they were the top two: gold medalist Vebjørn Rodal of Norway and silver medalist Hezekiél Sepeng of South Africa. Wilson Kipketer, who had been prevented from competing in the 1996 Games due to his change of nationality from Kenya to Denmark, was the favorite after having won the past three world championships and broken the world record twice. Challengers included Sepeng, 1998 European champion Nils Schumann of Germany, Yuriy Borzakovskiy of Russia, and André Bucher of Switzerland (a semifinalist in Atlanta).

Azerbaijan, Bahrain, Belarus, Macedonia, Moldova, and Uganda appeared in the event for the first time. Great Britain made its 23rd appearance, most among all nations, having had no competitors in the event only in the 1904 Games in St. Louis.

== Qualification ==
Each National Olympic Committee was permitted to enter up to three athletes that had run 1:46.30 or faster during the qualification period. The maximum number of athletes per nation had been set at 3 since the 1930 Olympic Congress. If a NOC had no athletes that qualified under that standard, one athlete that had run 1:47.20 or faster could be entered.

== Competition format ==
The men's 800 metres again used a three-round format, the most common format since 1912 though there had been variations. The "fastest loser" system introduced in 1964 was used for the first two rounds. There were eight first-round heats, each with 7 or 8 athletes; the top two runners in each heat as well as the next eight fastest overall advanced to the semifinals. There were three semifinals with 8 athletes each (except that one had an extra runner due to an advancement by obstruction rule in the first round); the top two runners in each semifinal and the next two fastest overall advanced to the eight-man final.

== Records ==
Prior to the competition, the existing World and Olympic records were as follows.

World record	Wilson Kipketer (DEN)	1:41.11	Cologne, Germany	24 August 1997
Olympic record	Vebjørn Rodal (NOR)	1:42.58	Atlanta, United States	29 July 1996

No world or Olympic records were set during the competition. The following national records were established during the competition:

Nation	Athlete	Round	Time
Botswana	Glody Dube	Semifinal 1	1:44.70

== Schedule ==
All times are Australian Eastern Standard Time (UTC+10)

Date	Time	Round
Saturday, 23 September 2000	10:45	Round 1
Monday, 25 September 2000	22:55	Semifinals
Wednesday, 27 September 2000	20:20	Final

== Results ==
=== Round 1 ===
The first round was held on Saturday, 23 September 2000.

==== Heat 1 ====
Rank	Lane	Athlete	Nation	Time	Notes
1	2	Andrea Longo	Italy	1:46.32	Q
2	3	Vebjørn Rodal	Norway	1:46.76	Q
3	8	James Mcilroy	Great Britain	1:47.44	q
4	1	Roman Oravec	Czech Republic	1:47.66	
5	5	Vanco Stojanov	Macedonia	1:47.71	
6	7	Rich Kenah	United States	1:47.85	
7	8	Kim Soon-Hyung	South Korea	1:48.49	
—	6	Mohamed Al-Kafraini	Jordan	DSQ	R163.3

==== Heat 2 ====
Rank	Lane	Athlete	Nation	Time	Notes
1	6	Nils Schumann	Germany	1:47.76	Q
2	7	Djabir Saïd-Guerni	Algeria	1:47.95	Q
3	3	Arthémon Hatungimana	Burundi	1:48.14	
4	2	Zach Whitmarsh	Canada	1:48.42	
5	4	David Matthews	Ireland	1:48.77	
6	8	Andrew Hart	Great Britain	1:48.78	
7	5	Isireli Naikelekelevesi	Fiji	1:49.61	

==== Heat 3 ====
Rank	Lane	Athlete	Nation	Time	Notes
1	6	Hezekiél Sepeng	South Africa	1:47.46	Q
2	1	Adem Hecini	Algeria	1:47.62	Q
3	4	Joseph Mutua	Kenya	1:47.86	
4	7	Dmitry Bogdanov	Russia	1:48.14	
5	5	Roberto Parra	Spain	1:48.19	
6	8	Bobby True	Liberia	1:48.79	
7	3	Mohamed Habib Bel Hadj	Tunisia	1:49.14	
8	2	Jorge Duvane	Mozambique	1:52.97	

==== Heat 4 ====
Rank	Lane	Athlete	Nation	Time	Notes
1	3	Wilson Kipketer	Denmark	1:45.57	Q
2	2	Glody Dube	Botswana	1:46.17	Q, PB
3	7	Johan Botha	South Africa	1:46.91	q
4	1	Crispen Mutakanyi	Zimbabwe	1:47.66	
5	8	Jose Manuel Cerezo	Spain	1:48.11	
6	4	Artyom Mastrov	Russia	1:49.89	
7	5	Ian Roberts	Guyana	1:52.32	
8	6	Marvin Watts	Jamaica	1:59.97	

==== Heat 5 ====
Rank	Lane	Athlete	Nation	Time	Notes
1	4	Pavel Pelepyagin	Belarus	1:46.47	Q
2	3	Jean-Patrick Nduwimana	Burundi	1:46.78	Q
3	5	El Mahjoub Haida	Morocco	1:47.14	q
4	8	William Yiampoy	Kenya	1:47.35	q
5	6	João Pires	Portugal	1:47.61	
6	1	Abdou Ibrahim Youssef	Qatar	1:53.23	
7	7	Naseer Ismail	Maldives	1:56.67	
8	2	Faiq Bağırov	Azerbaijan	1:57.39	

==== Heat 6 ====
Rank	Lane	Athlete	Nation	Time	Notes
1	2	Yuriy Borzakovskiy	Russia	1:45.39	Q
2	7	Japheth Kimutai	Kenya	1:45.60	Q
3	3	Grant Cremer	Australia	1:45.86	q, SB
4	1	Balázs Korányi	Hungary	1:46.21	q, SB
5	6	Bryan Woodward	United States	1:47.64	
6	8	Mehdi Jelodarzadeh	Iran	1:47.91	
7	4	Mohamed Saleh Hadj Haidara	Bahrain	1:56.64	
8	5	Mohammed Yagoub	Sudan	DNS	

==== Heat 7 ====
Rank	Lane	Athlete	Nation	Time	Notes
1	2	Khalid Tighazouine	Morocco	1:46.33	Q
2	8	André Bucher	Switzerland	1:46.51	Q
3	4	Viktors Lacis	Latvia	1:46.94	q, SB
4	3	Osmar dos Santos	Brazil	1:47.05	q
5	7	Milton Browne	Barbados	1:47.63	SB
6	6	Nathan Kahan	Belgium	1:47.69	
7	5	Panayiótis Stroubákos	Greece	1:47.96	

==== Heat 8 ====
Rank	Lane	Athlete	Nation	Time	Notes
1	7	Werner Botha	South Africa	1:47.85	Q
2	6	Mouhssin Chehibi	Morocco	1:48.51	Q
3	1	Bram Som	Netherlands	1:48.58	
4	2	Kris McCarthy	Australia	1:48.92	
5	5	Mark Everett	United States	1:49.77	
6	4	Paskar Owor	Uganda	1:49.99	
7	8	Vitalie Cercheș	Moldova	1:52.15	
8	3	Puntsag-Ochiryn Pürevsüren	Mongolia	1:56.29	

==== Overall results for round 1 ====
Round 1 Overall Results
Place	Athlete	Nation	Heat	Lane	Place	Time	Qual.	Record
1	Yuriy Borzakovskiy	Russia	6	2	1	1:45.39	Q	
2	Wilson Kipketer	Denmark	4	3	1	1:45.57	Q	
3	Japheth Kimutai	Kenya	6	7	2	1:45.60	Q	
4	Grant Cremer	Australia	6	3	3	1:45.86	q	SB
5	Glody Dube	Botswana	4	2	2	1:46.17	Q	PB
6	Balázs Korányi	Hungary	6	1	4	1:46.21	q	SB
7	Andrea Longo	Italy	1	2	1	1:46.32	Q	
8	Khalid Tighazouine	Morocco	7	2	1	1:46.33	Q	
9	André Bucher	Switzerland	7	8	2	1:46.51	Q	
10	Pavel Pelepyagin	Belarus	5	4	1	1:46.67	Q	
11	Vebjoern Rodal	Norway	1	3	2	1:46.76	Q	
12	Jean Patrick Nduwimana	Burundi	5	3	2	1:46.78	Q	
13	Johan Botha	South Africa	4	7	3	1:46.91	q	
14	Viktors Lacis	Latvia	7	4	3	1:46.94	q	SB
15	Osmar dos Santos	Brazil	7	3	4	1:47.05	q	
16	El Mahjoub Haida	Morocco	5	5	3	1:47.14	q	
17	William Yiampoy	Kenya	5	8	4	1:47.35	q	
18	James McIlroy	Great Britain	1	8	3	1:47.44	q	
19	Hezekiél Sepeng	South Africa	3	6	1	1:47.46	Q	
20	Joao Pires	Portugal	5	6	5	1:47.61		
21	Adem Hecini	Algeria	3	1	2	1:47.62	Q	
22	Milton O Browne	Barbados	7	7	5	1:47.63		SB
23	Bryan Woodward	United States	6	6	5	1:47.64		
24	Crispen Mutakanyi	Zimbabwe	4	1	4	1:47.66		
24	Roman Oravec	Czech Republic	1	1	4	1:47.66		
26	Nathan Kahan	Belgium	7	6	6	1:47.69		
27	Vanco Stojanov	Macedonia	1	5	5	1:47.71		
28	Nils Schumann	Germany	2	6	1	1:47.76	Q	
29	Werner Botha	South Africa	8	7	1	1:47.83	Q	
30	Rich Kenah	United States	1	7	6	1:47.85		
31	Joseph Mutua	Kenya	3	4	3	1:47.86		
32	Mehdi Jelodarzadeh	Iran	6	8	6	1:47.91		
33	Djabir Saïd-Guerni	Algeria	2	7	2	1:47.95	Q	
34	Panayiótis Stroubákos	Greece	7	5	7	1:47.96		
35	Jose Manuel Cerezo	Spain	4	8	5	1:48.11		
36	Dmitriy Bogdanov	Russia	3	7	4	1:48.14		
36	Arthemon Hatungimana	Burundi	2	3	3	1:48.14		
38	Roberto Parra	Spain	3	5	5	1:48.19		
39	Zach Whitmarsh	Canada	2	2	4	1:48.42		
40	Kim Soon-Hyung	South Korea	1	4	7	1:48.49		SB
41	Mouhssin Chehibi	Morocco	8	6	2	1:48.51	Q	
42	Bram Som	Netherlands	8	1	3	1:48.58		
43	David Matthews	Ireland	2	4	5	1:48.77		
44	Andrew Hart	Great Britain	2	8	6	1:48.78		
45	Bobby True	Liberia	3	8	6	1:48.79		
46	Kris McCarthy	Australia	8	2	4	1:48.92		
47	Habib Mohamed Belhadj	Tunisia	3	3	7	1:49.14		
48	Isireli Naikelekelevesi	Fiji	2	5	7	1:49.61		
49	Mark Everett	United States	8	5	5	1:49.77		
50	Artem Mastrov	Russia	4	4	6	1:49.89		
51	Paskar Owor	Uganda	8	4	6	1:49.99		
52	Vitalie Cercheș	Moldova	8	8	7	1:52.15		
53	Ian Roberts	Guyana	4	5	7	1:52.32		
54	Jorge Duvane	Mozambique	3	2	8	1:52.97		
55	Abdu I Yousuf	Qatar	5	1	6	1:53.23		
56	Puntsag-Osor Purevsuren	Mongolia	8	3	8	1:56.29		
57	Mohamed S. Naji Haidara	Bahrain	6	4	7	1:56.64		
58	Naseer Ismail	Maldives	5	7	7	1:56.67		
59	Faig Baghirov	Azerbaijan	5	2	8	1:57.39		
60	Marvin Watts	Jamaica	4	6	8	1:59.97		
	Mohammad Alkafraini	Jordan	1	6		DSQ		
	Mahamed Yagoub	Sudan	6	5		DNS		

=== Semifinals ===
==== Semifinal 1 ====
Rank	Lane	Athlete	Nation	Time	Notes
1	1	Nils Schumann	Germany	1:44.22	Q, PB
2	5	André Bucher	Switzerland	1:44.38	Q
3	2	Glody Dube	Botswana	1:44.70	q, NR
4	6	Hezekiél Sepeng	South Africa	1:44.85	q
5	4	William Yiampoy	Kenya	1:45.88	
6	7	James McIlroy	Great Britain	1:46.39	
7	3	Vebjørn Rodal	Norway	1:48.73	
8	6	Mouhssin Chehibi	Morocco	1:49.88	

==== Semifinal 2 ====
Rank	Lane	Athlete	Nation	Time	Notes
1	5	Djabir Saïd-Guerni	Algeria	1:44.19	Q
2	3	Yuriy Borzakovskiy	Russia	1:44.33	Q, PB
3	1	Khalid Tighazouine	Morocco	1:45.38	PB
4	2	Johan Botha	South Africa	1:45.49	
5	6	Japheth Kimutai	Kenya	1:45.64	
6	4	Jean-Patrick Nduwimana	Burundi	1:46.98	
7	8	Pavel Pelepyagin	Belarus	1:50.37	
8	7	Grant Cremer	Australia	1:52.57	

==== Semifinal 3 ====
Rank	Lane	Athlete	Nation	Time	Notes
1	3	Wilson Kipketer	Denmark	1:44.22	Q
2	4	Andrea Longo	Italy	1:44.49	Q
3	6	Adem Hecini	Algeria	1:45.08	
4	7	Mahjoub Haïda	Morocco	1:46:35	
5	5	Werner Botha	South Africa	1:46.53	
6	2	Viktors Lacis	Latvia	1:47.24	
7	8	Balázs Korányi	Hungary	1:47.35	
8	9	Marvin Watts	Jamaica	1:47.68	
8	1	Osmar dos Santos	Brazil	1:47.68	

==== Overall results for semifinals ====
Rank	Athlete	Nation	Heat	Lane	Place	Time	Qual.	Record
1	Djabir Saïd-Guerni	Algeria	2	5	1	1:44.19	Q	
2	Wilson Kipketer	Denmark	3	3	1	1:44.22	Q	
2	Nils Schumann	Germany	1	1	1	1:44.22	Q	PB
4	Yuriy Borzakovskiy	Russia	2	3	2	1:44.33	Q	PB
5	André Bucher	Switzerland	1	5	2	1:44.38	Q	
6	Andrea Longo	Italy	3	4	2	1:44.49	Q	
7	Glody Dube	Botswana	1	2	3	1:44.70	q	NR
8	Hezekiél Sepeng	South Africa	1	6	4	1:44.85	q	
9	Adem Hecini	Algeria	3	6	3	1:45.08		
10	Khalid Tighazouine	Morocco	2	1	3	1:45.38		PB
11	Johan Botha	South Africa	2	2	4	1:45.49		
12	Japheth Kimutai	Kenya	2	6	5	1:45.64		
13	William Yiampoy	Kenya	1	4	5	1:45.88		
14	El Mahjoub Haida	Morocco	3	7	4	1:46.35		
15	James McIlroy	Great Britain	1	7	6	1:46.39		
16	Werner Botha	South Africa	3	3	5	1:46.53		
17	Jean Patrick Nduwimana	Burundi	2	4	6	1:46.98		
18	Viktors Lacis	Latvia	3	2	6	1:47.24		
19	Balázs Korányi	Hungary	3	8	7	1:47.35		
20	Marvin Watts	Jamaica	3	9	8	1:47.68		
20	Osmar dos Santos	Brazil	3	1	8	1:47.68		
22	Vebjoern Rodal	Norway	1	3	7	1:48.73		
23	Mouhssin Chehibi	Morocco	1	8	8	1:49.88		
24	Pavel Pelepyagin	Belarus	2	8	7	1:50.37		
25	Grant Cremer	Australia	2	7	8	1:52.57		

=== Final ===
Rank	Lane	Athlete	Nation	Time
1st place, gold medalist(s)	2	Nils Schumann	Germany	1:45.08
2nd place, silver medalist(s)	3	Wilson Kipketer	Denmark	1:45.14
3rd place, bronze medalist(s)	5	Djabir Saïd-Guerni	Algeria	1:45.16
4	7	Hezekiél Sepeng	South Africa	1:45.29
5	4	André Bucher	Switzerland	1:45.40
6	8	Yuriy Borzakovskiy	Russia	1:45.83
7	1	Glody Dube	Botswana	1:46.24
8	6	Andrea Longo	Italy	DSQ

Source: Official Report of the 2000 Sydney Summer Olympics
