= 1997 World Championships in Athletics – Men's 800 metres =

These are the results of the Men's 800 metres event at the 1997 World Championships in Athletics in Athens, Greece on 4–8 August.

== Medalists ==
Gold	Wilson Kipketer; Denmark (DEN)
Silver	Norberto Téllez; Cuba (CUB)
Bronze	Rich Kenah; United States (USA)

== Results ==
=== Heats ===
First 4 of each Heat (Q) and the next 4 fastest (q) qualified for the quarterfinals.

Rank	Heat	Name	Nationality	Time	Notes
1	1	Wilson Kipketer	Denmark	1:46.34	Q
2	1	Hezekiel Sepeng	South Africa	1:46.42	Q
3	2	Norberto Téllez	Cuba	1:46.44	Q
4	2	Panagiotis Stroubakos	Greece	1:46.49	Q
5	2	Andrea Longo	Italy	1:46.79	Q
6	1	Einārs Tupurītis	Latvia	1:46.96	Q
6	2	Mario Vernon-Watson	Jamaica	1:46.96	Q
8	2	Savieri Ngidhi	Zimbabwe	1:46.97	q
9	7	Mark Everett	United States	1:47.10	Q
10	4	Patrick Konchellah	Kenya	1:47.15	Q
10	7	Benson Koech	Kenya	1:47.15	Q
12	3	Marko Koers	Netherlands	1:47.17	Q
13	3	Rich Kenah	United States	1:47.25	Q
14	1	Tor Oivind Odegard	Norway	1:47.33	Q
14	4	David Matthews	Ireland	1:47.33	Q
14	7	Benyounes Lahlou	Morocco	1:47.33	Q
17	7	Babiker Mohammed Yagoub	Sudan	1:47.34	Q
18	3	André Bucher	Switzerland	1:47.44	Q
19	7	Kennedy Osei	Ghana	1:47.45	q
20	2	Ivan Komar	Belarus	1:47.53	q
20	3	José Luíz Barbosa	Brazil	1:47.53	Q
22	4	Marius Van Heerden	South Africa	1:47.56	Q
23	5	Vebjørn Rodal	Norway	1:47.58	Q
24	4	Nathan Kahan	Belgium	1:47.62	Q
25	7	José Manuel Cerezo	Spain	1:47.68	q
26	5	Arthemon Hatungimana	Burundi	1:47.73	Q
27	1	Jean-Marc Destine	Haiti	1:47.76	
28	3	Michael Wildner	Austria	1:47.77	
29	1	Joseph Rakotoarimanana	Madagascar	1:47.86	
30	5	Andrew Hart	Great Britain	1:47.98	Q
31	5	Hendrik Mokganyetsi	South Africa	1:48.10	Q
32	3	Sergey Kozhevnikov	Russia	1:48.11	
33	5	Pavel Soukup	Czech Republic	1:48.16	
34	7	Tim Rogge	Belgium	1:48.38	
35	4	Viktors Lācis	Latvia	1:48.65	
36	5	Mark Tonks	New Zealand	1:48.85	
37	1	Mark Sesay	Great Britain	1:49.00	
38	6	Patrick Ndururi	Kenya	1:49.51	Q
39	6	Lukáš Vydra	Czech Republic	1:50.08	Q
40	2	Ali Khazaal	Lebanon	1:50.66	
41	7	Alex Morgan	Jamaica	1:50.83	
42	2	Vančo Stojanov	Macedonia	1:52.65	
43	3	Mohamed Haidara	Bahrain	1:53.56	
44	5	Terap Adoum Yaya	Chad	1:54.01	
45	6	Adem Hecini	Algeria	1:55.25	Q
46	5	Manlio Molinari	San Marino	1:55.89	
47	1	Chérif Baba Aidara	Mauritania	1:56.85	
48	6	Brandon Rock	United States	1:58.05	Q
49	4	Liam Byrne	Gibraltar	2:00.18	
50	6	Cuthbert Modeste	Saint Lucia	2:01.24	
	3	Giuseppe D'Urso	Italy	DNF	
	4	Mahjoub Haida	Morocco	DNF	
	6	Paul Walker	Great Britain	DNF	
	4	Julius Achon	Uganda	DNS	
	6	Mahdi Moullai	Iran	DNS	
	6	Graham Hood	Canada	DNS	

=== Quarterfinals ===
First 3 of each Heat (Q) and the next 4 fastest (q) qualified for the semifinals.

Rank	Heat	Name	Nationality	Time	Notes
1	2	Norberto Téllez	Cuba	1:44.82	Q
2	2	Hezekiel Sepeng	South Africa	1:44.91	Q, SB
3	2	Mark Everett	United States	1:44.95	Q
4	2	Adem Hecini	Algeria	1:45.19	q, SB
5	2	André Bucher	Switzerland	1:45.33	q, PB
6	2	Tor Oivind Odegard	Norway	1:45.42	q, PB
7	4	Wilson Kipketer	Denmark	1:45.54	Q
8	2	Babiker Mohammed Yagoub	Sudan	1:45.73	q, PB
9	4	Panagiotis Stroubakos	Greece	1:45.94	Q
10	4	Kennedy Osei	Ghana	1:46.00	Q
11	3	Vebjørn Rodal	Norway	1:46.43	Q
12	3	Patrick Konchellah	Kenya	1:46.43	Q
13	4	Hendrik Mokganyetsi	South Africa	1:46.45	
14	3	Rich Kenah	United States	1:46.48	Q
15	1	Marko Koers	Netherlands	1:46.52	Q
16	1	Patrick Ndururi	Kenya	1:46.56	Q
17	4	Andrea Longo	Italy	1:46.60	
18	1	Benyounes Lahlou	Morocco	1:46.63	Q
19	3	Arthemon Hatungimana	Burundi	1:46.64	
20	2	David Matthews	Ireland	1:46.66	
21	1	Savieri Ngidhi	Zimbabwe	1:46.92	
22	3	Einārs Tupurītis	Latvia	1:46.97	
23	4	Brandon Rock	United States	1:47.13	
24	3	Marius Van Heerden	South Africa	1:47.20	
25	3	José Luíz Barbosa	Brazil	1:47.30	
26	1	Lukáš Vydra	Czech Republic	1:47.56	
27	3	Andrew Hart	Great Britain	1:48.03	
28	1	Nathan Kahan	Belgium	1:48.66	
29	4	José Manuel Cerezo	Spain	1:48.90	
30	1	Mario Vernon-Watson	Jamaica	1:49.52	
31	1	Ivan Komar	Belarus	1:50.17	
	4	Benson Koech	Kenya	DNS	

=== Semifinals ===
First 4 of each Semifinal qualified directly (Q) for the final.

Rank	Heat	Name	Nationality	Time	Notes
1	1	Patrick Konchellah	Kenya	1:45.07	Q
2	1	Norberto Téllez	Cuba	1:45.37	Q
3	1	Vebjørn Rodal	Norway	1:45.41	Q
4	1	Mark Everett	United States	1:45.94	Q
5	1	Adem Hecini	Algeria	1:46.02	
6	1	Mohammed Yagoub Babiker	Sudan	1:46.09	
7	2	Wilson Kipketer	Denmark	1:46.14	Q
8	2	Rich Kenah	United States	1:46.37	Q
9	1	Benyounes Lahlou	Morocco	1:46.42	
10	2	Patrick Ndururi	Kenya	1:46.50	Q
11	2	Marko Koers	Netherlands	1:46.62	Q
12	2	Kennedy Osei	Ghana	1:46.78	
13	1	Panagiotis Stroubakos	Greece	1:46.81	
14	2	André Bucher	Switzerland	1:46.88	
15	2	Hezekiel Sepeng	South Africa	1:47.00	
16	2	Tor Oivind Odegard	Norway	1:47.83	

=== Final ===
Rank	Name	Nationality	Time	Notes
1st place, gold medalist(s)	Wilson Kipketer	Denmark	1:43.38	
2nd place, silver medalist(s)	Norberto Téllez	Cuba	1:44.00	SB
3rd place, bronze medalist(s)	Rich Kenah	United States	1:44.25	PB
4	Patrick Konchellah	Kenya	1:44.26	
5	Vebjørn Rodal	Norway	1:44.53	
6	Marko Koers	Netherlands	1:44.85	
7	Patrick Ndururi	Kenya	1:45.24	
8	Mark Everett	United States	1:49.02	
