= 1999 World Championships in Athletics – Men's 800 metres =

These are the official results of the Men's 800 metres event at the 1999 IAAF World Championships in Seville, Spain. There were a total number of 59 participating athletes, with eight qualifying heats, three semi-finals and the final held on Sunday 29 August 1999 at 20:30h.

== Medalists ==
Gold	Wilson Kipketer; Denmark (DEN)
Silver	Hezekiél Sepeng; South Africa (RSA)
Bronze	Djabir Saïd-Guerni; Algeria (ALG)

== Heats ==
- Held on Thursday 26 August 1999

RANK	HEAT 1	TIME
1.	Wilson Kipketer (DEN)	1:47.29
2.	Savieri Ngidhi (ZIM)	1:47.58
3.	Vebjørn Rodal (NOR)	1:48.05
4.	Assane Diallo (SEN)	1:48.06
5.	Khadevis Robinson (USA)	1:48.31
6.	José Manuel Cerezo (ESP)	1:50.08
	Milton Browne (BAR)	DQ

RANK	HEAT 2	TIME
1.	André Bucher (SUI)	1:46.81
2.	Wojciech Kałdowski (POL)	1:46.88
3.	Arthémon Hatungimana (BDI)	1:47.08
4.	Mark Sesay (GBR)	1:47.48
5.	Mouhssin Chehibi (MAR)	1:47.65
6.	Frederick Onyancha (KEN)	1:47.76
7.	Naseer Ismail (MDV)	1:56.67
	Karma Dorji (BHU)	DQ

RANK	HEAT 3	TIME
1.	Andrea Longo (ITA)	1:45.01
2.	Grant Cremer (AUS)	1:45.21
3.	Adem Hecini (ALG)	1:46.13
4.	James Nolan (IRL)	1:46.38
5.	Kim Soon-Hyung (KOR)	1:46.78
6.	Guillaume Douceret (FRA)	1:47.69
7.	Mohamed Abd El Rahman (SUD)	1:53.67

RANK	HEAT 4	TIME
1.	Rich Kenah (USA)	1:47.95
2.	Kennedy Kimwetich (KEN)	1:48.45
3.	Khaled Azerkan (SWE)	1:48.46
4.	Crispen Mutakanyi (ZIM)	1:48.73
5.	Aleksander Trutko (BLR)	1:48.99
6.	Curtis Robb (GBR)	1:49.13
7.	Batmunkh Banzragch (MGL)	2:02.42
	Lucky Hadebe (RSA)	DQ

RANK	HEAT 5	TIME
1.	Djabir Saïd-Guerni (ALG)	1:45.65
2.	Hezekiél Sepeng (RSA)	1:46.01
3.	Nico Motchebon (GER)	1:46.18
4.	Rachid Khouia (MAR)	1:46.96
5.	Ian Roberts (GUY)	1:47.53
6.	Urmet Uusorg (EST)	1:48.85
7.	Mohammed Al Fayet (PLE)	1:52.53

RANK	HEAT 6	TIME
1.	Johan Botha (RSA)	1:46.59
2.	Jean-Patrick Nduwimana (BDI)	1:46.73
3.	Nils Schumann (GER)	1:46.79
4.	João Pires (POR)	1:47.08
5.	Jason Lobo (GBR)	1:47.53
6.	Balázs Korányi (HUN)	1:47.60
7.	Carlos Calvo (LUX)	1:48.48

RANK	HEAT 7	TIME
1.	Japheth Kimutai (KEN)	1:45.66
2.	Roman Oravec (CZE)	1:45.80
3.	Bryan Woodward (USA)	1:45.98
4.	Glody Dube (BOT)	1:46.67
5.	Zach Whitmarsh (CAN)	1:47.01
6.	Tor Øivind Ødegård (NOR)	1:47.07
7.	Víctor Martínez (AND)	1:48.73

RANK	HEAT 8	TIME
1.	Wilson Kirwa (FIN)	1:46.20
2.	Roberto Parra (ESP)	1:46.22
3.	Norberto Téllez (CUB)	1:46.24
4.	Mahjoub Haïda (MAR)	1:46.86
5.	Panagiotis Stroubakos (GRE)	1:48.56
6.	David Matthews (IRL)	1:49.52
7.	Ketson Kabiriel (MNP)	2:07.73
	Abdul Rahman Hasan Abdulla (QAT)	DNS

== Semi-final ==
- Held on Friday 27 August 1999

RANK	HEAT 1	TIME
1.	Hezekiél Sepeng (RSA)	1:45.20
2.	Andrea Longo (ITA)	1:45.63
3.	Rich Kenah (USA)	1:45.99
4.	Roberto Parra (ESP)	1:46.07
5.	Wojciech Kałdowski (POL)	1:46.49
6.	Adem Hecini (ALG)	1:46.61
7.	James Nolan (IRL)	1:47.07
8.	Kim Soon-Hyung (KOR)	1:47.15

RANK	HEAT 2	TIME
1.	Wilson Kipketer (DEN)	1:44.87
2.	Djabir Saïd-Guerni (ALG)	1:45.17
3.	Norberto Téllez (CUB)	1:45.22
4.	Kennedy Kimwetich (KEN)	1:45.67
5.	Roman Oravec (CZE)	1:45.78
6.	Savieri Ngidhi (ZIM)	1:46.56
7.	Wilson Kirwa (FIN)	1:46.65
8.	Nico Motchebon (GER)	1:47.17

RANK	HEAT 3	TIME
1.	Japheth Kimutai (KEN)	1:47.74
2.	Nils Schumann (GER)	1:47.90
3.	André Bucher (SUI)	1:48.07
4.	Grant Cremer (AUS)	1:48.22
5.	Glody Dube (BOT)	1:48.67
6.	Jean-Patrick Nduwimana (BDI)	1:48.91
7.	Johan Botha (RSA)	1:49.71
8.	Bryan Woodward (USA)	1:55.52

== Final ==
RANK	FINAL	TIME
	Wilson Kipketer (DEN)	1:43.30
	Hezekiél Sepeng (RSA)	1:43.32
	Djabir Saïd-Guerni (ALG)	1:44.18
4.	Norberto Téllez (CUB)	1:45.03
5.	Japheth Kimutai (KEN)	1:45.18
6.	Andrea Longo (ITA)	1:45.33
7.	Kennedy Kimwetich (KEN)	1:46.27
8.	Nils Schumann (GER)	1:46.79
