= 2001 World Championships in Athletics – Men's 800 metres =

These are the official results of the Men's 800 metres event at the 2001 IAAF World Championships in Edmonton, Canada. There were a total number of 37 participating athletes, with five qualifying heats, two semi-finals and the final held on Tuesday 7 August 2001 at 19:50h.

André Bucher came into this race having dominated these same competitors throughout the Golden League season. Bucher started hard but Wilfred Bungei pushed the break to take the lead past the bell in 50.41. As they hit the backstretch, Bucher set Bungei up and passed him with 300 metres to go. From there he just continued to pull away from Bungei, opening up over 5 metres by the finish line. The rest of the field strung out behind William Yiampoy the last pursuer. Paweł Czapiewski was in last place, 2 metres behind the back of the pack with 200 metres to go, still at the home straightaway, he had only passed Nils Schumann. Sprinting down the outside of lane 2, Czapiewski ran past the field passing Yiampoy with 12 metres to go, but too much distance to get to Bungei, Czapiewski took home bronze.

== Medalists ==
Gold	André Bucher; Switzerland (SUI)
Silver	Wilfred Bungei; Kenya (KEN)
Bronze	Paweł Czapiewski; Poland (POL)

== Records ==
Standing records prior to the 2001 World Athletics Championships
World Record	Wilson Kipketer (DEN)	1:41.11	August 24, 1997	Cologne, Germany
Event Record	Billy Konchellah (KEN)	1:43.06	September 1, 1987	Rome, Italy
Season Best	André Bucher (SUI)	1:42.90	July 20, 2001	Monte Carlo, Monaco

== Final ==
RANK	FINAL	TIME
	André Bucher (SUI)	1:43.70
	Wilfred Bungei (KEN)	1:44.55
	Paweł Czapiewski (POL)	1:44.63
4.	William Yiampoy (KEN)	1:44.96
5.	Nils Schumann (GER)	1:45.00
6.	Mbulaeni Mulaudzi (RSA)	1:45.01
7.	Khalid Tighazouine (MAR)	1:45.58
8.	Hezekiél Sepeng (RSA)	1:46.68

== Semi-final ==
- Held on Sunday 5 August 2001

RANK	HEAT 1	TIME
1.	Wilfred Bungei (KEN)	1:45.66
2.	Khalid Tighazouine (MAR)	1:45.69
3.	Nils Schumann (GER)	1:45.86
4.	Hezekiél Sepeng (RSA)	1:45.97
5.	Jean-Patrick Nduwimana (BDI)	1:46.42
6.	Glody Dube (BOT)	1:46.91
7.	David Krummenacker (USA)	1:47.46
8.	Nicholas Wachira (KEN)	1:48.93

RANK	HEAT 2	TIME
1.	André Bucher (SUI)	1:44.47
2.	William Yiampoy (KEN)	1:44.61
3.	Mbulaeni Mulaudzi (RSA)	1:44.81
4.	Paweł Czapiewski (POL)	1:44.89
5.	Arthémon Hatungimana (BDI)	1:45.21
6.	Adem Hecini (ALG)	1:46.02
7.	Bram Som (NED)	1:47.40
8.	Marvin Watts (JAM)	1:47.64

== Heats ==
Held on Tuesday 7 August 2001

RANK	HEAT 1	TIME
1.	Nils Schumann (GER)	1:45.69
2.	Hezekiél Sepeng (RSA)	1:45.93
3.	Arthémon Hatungimana (BDI)	1:45.97
4.	Grzegorz Krzosek (POL)	1:47.17
5.	Derrick Peterson (USA)	1:48.56
6.	Mohamed S. Naji Haidara (BHR)	1:49.09
7.	Vanco Stojanov (MKD)	1:49.54

RANK	HEAT 2	TIME
1.	Wilfred Bungei (KEN)	1:44.73
2.	Paweł Czapiewski (POL)	1:45.57
3.	Bram Som (NED)	1:45.60
4.	Daniel Caulfield (IRL)	1:47.23
5.	Wilson Kirwa (FIN)	1:47.65
6.	Boris Kaveshnikov (RUS)	1:47.65
7.	Saïdou Mahamadou (NIG)	1:57.47
—	Douzi Nguerdjeoubel (CHA)	DNS

RANK	HEAT 3	TIME
1.	André Bucher (SUI)	1:45.49
2.	Khalid Tighazouine (MAR)	1:45.63
3.	Mbulaeni Mulaudzi (RSA)	1:46.05
4.	João Pires (POR)	1:47.34
5.	Khadevis Robinson (USA)	1:49.42
6.	Isireli Naikelekelevesi (FIJ)	1:50.74
7.	John Lozada (PHI)	1:59.63

RANK	HEAT 4	TIME
1.	William Yiampoy (KEN)	1:48.02
2.	David Krummenacker (USA)	1:48.15
3.	Antonio Manuel Reina (ESP)	1:48.26
4.	Joeri Jansen (BEL)	1:48.42
5.	Nathan Brannen (CAN)	1:48.60
6.	Otukile Lekote (BOT)	1:49.40
7.	Liam Byrne (GIB)	1:55.98
8.	Naseer Ismail (MDV)	2:00.19

RANK	HEAT 5	TIME
1.	Jean-Patrick Nduwimana (BDI)	1:45.13
2.	Glody Dube (BOT)	1:45.39
3.	Adem Hecini (ALG)	1:45.56
4.	Nicholas Wachira (KEN)	1:45.97
5.	Marvin Watts (JAM)	1:46.43
6.	Tom Omey (BEL)	1:48.37
7.	Prince Mumba (ZAM)	1:49.49
