= Athletics at the 1998 Asian Games – Men's 800 metres =

Men's 800 metres at the 1998 Asian Games
- Venue: Thammasat Stadium
- Dates: 15–17 December 1998
- Competitors: 19 from 14 nations

Medalists
gold medal	Lee Jin-il	South Korea
silver medal	Kim Soon-hyung	South Korea
bronze medal	Abdulrahman Hassan Abdullah	Qatar

The men's 800 metres competition at the 1998 Asian Games in Bangkok, Thailand was held on 15–17 December at the Thammasat Stadium.

== Schedule ==
All times are Indochina Time (UTC+07:00)

Date	Time	Event
Tuesday, 15 December 1998	15:20	Heats
Thursday, 17 December 1998	16:00	Final

== Results ==
=== Heats ===
- Qualification: First 2 in each heat (Q) and the next 2 fastest (q) advance to the final.

==== Heat 1 ====
Rank	Athlete	Time	Notes
1	Lee Jin-il (KOR)	1:51.85	Q
2	Abdou Ibrahim Youssef (QAT)	1:52.07	Q
3	Boris Kaveshnikov (KGZ)	1:52.25	
4	Song Mingyou (CHN)	1:52.51	
5	Mohammad Reza Molaei (IRI)	1:52.61	
6	Mohammad Al-Matari (JOR)	1:55.20	
7	Naseer Ismail (MDV)	1:55.31	

==== Heat 2 ====
Rank	Athlete	Time	Notes
1	Abdulrahman Hassan Abdullah (QAT)	1:50.82	Q
2	Mahmoud Al-Kheirat (SYR)	1:51.32	Q
3	Abdullah Mohammed Al-Anbari (OMA)	1:51.97	
4	Phan Văn Hoá (VIE)	1:54.10	
5	Vasu Subramaniam (MAS)	1:54.65	
6	Mohammad Ayed (JOR)	1:55.22	

==== Heat 3 ====
Rank	Athlete	Time	Notes
1	Kim Soon-hyung (KOR)	1:50.13	Q
2	Mehdi Jelodarzadeh (IRI)	1:50.28	Q
3	Tomohiro Kitamura (JPN)	1:50.30	q
4	Cheng Bing (CHN)	1:50.55	q
5	Sutus Sikawkhiew (THA)	1:50.72	
6	Basheer Al-Khewani (YEM)	1:56.77	

=== Final ===
Rank	Athlete	Time	Notes
1st place, gold medalist(s)	Lee Jin-il (KOR)	1:46.56	
2nd place, silver medalist(s)	Kim Soon-hyung (KOR)	1:46.61	
3rd place, bronze medalist(s)	Abdulrahman Hassan Abdullah (QAT)	1:47.10	
4	Abdou Ibrahim Youssef (QAT)	1:47.45	
5	Mahmoud Al-Kheirat (SYR)	1:48.33	
6	Mehdi Jelodarzadeh (IRI)	1:48:58	
7	Cheng Bing (CHN)	1:48.89	
8	Tomohiro Kitamura (JPN)	1:53.50	
