= 1997 IAAF World Indoor Championships – Men's 800 metres =

The men's 800 metres event at the 1997 IAAF World Indoor Championships was held on 7–9 March 1997.

The winning margin was 3.09 seconds which as of July 2024 remains the only time the men's 800 metres was won by more than 1.5 seconds at these championships.

== Medalists ==
Gold	Silver	Bronze
Wilson Kipketer; Denmark	Mahjoub Haida; Morocco	Rich Kenah; United States

== Results ==
=== Heats ===
First 2 of each heat (Q) and next 8 fastest (q) qualified for the semifinals.

Rank	Heat	Name	Nationality	Time	Notes
1	5	Wilson Kipketer	Denmark	1:43.96	Q, WR
2	1	Marko Koers	Netherlands	1:48.04	Q
3	5	James Nolan	Ireland	1:48.21	Q
4	4	Rich Kenah	United States	1:48.42	Q
5	5	Andy Hart	Great Britain	1:48.45	q
6	1	Pavel Soukup	Czech Republic	1:48.54	Q
6	4	Robert Chirchir	Kenya	1:48.54	Q
8	1	Einārs Tupurītis	Latvia	1:48.56	q
9	4	Nico Motchebon	Germany	1:48.69	q
10	2	Mahjoub Haida	Morocco	1:48.77	Q
11	1	Oliver Münzer	Austria	1:48.85	q
12	5	Kennedy Osei	Ghana	1:49.00	q
13	2	Mark Eplinius	Germany	1:49.08	Q
14	2	Andrea Longo	Italy	1:49.30	q
15	5	Mario Vernon-Watson	Jamaica	1:49.56	q
16	4	Jean-Marc Destine	Haiti	1:49.64	q
17	1	David Matthews	Ireland	1:49.65	
18	2	Flávio Godoy	Brazil	1:49.93	
19	4	Roman Oravec	Czech Republic	1:51.33	
20	3	Savieri Ngidhi	Zimbabwe	1:52.73	Q
21	3	Benyounés Lahlou	Morocco	1:52.79	Q
22	3	Boris Kaveshnikov	Kyrgyzstan	1:52.96	
23	3	Joseph Rakotoarimanana	Madagascar	1:53.28	
24	1	Puntsag-Osor Purevsuren	Mongolia	1:55.76	
25	4	Reuben Silwimba	Zambia	1:56.20	
26	3	Mark Everett	United States	1:57.16	
	2	Mahmoud Al-Kheirat	Syria	DNS	
	2	Mahdi Moullai	Iran	DNS	

=== Semifinals ===
First 2 of each semifinal (Q) qualified directly for the final.

Rank	Heat	Name	Nationality	Time	Notes
1	1	Mahjoub Haida	Morocco	1:47.22	Q
2	1	Einārs Tupurītis	Latvia	1:47.47	Q
3	2	Marko Koers	Netherlands	1:47.75	Q
4	2	Nico Motchebon	Germany	1:48.20	Q
5	1	Mario Vernon-Watson	Jamaica	1:48.32	
6	1	Kennedy Osei	Ghana	1:48.40	
7	1	Oliver Münzer	Austria	1:48.47	
8	3	Wilson Kipketer	Denmark	1:48.49	Q
9	1	Savieri Ngidhi	Zimbabwe	1:48.70	
10	2	Pavel Soukup	Czech Republic	1:48.73	
11	2	James Nolan	Ireland	1:48.75	
12	2	Benyounés Lahlou	Morocco	1:49.18	
13	2	Andy Hart	Great Britain	1:49.20	
14	3	Rich Kenah	United States	1:49.21	Q
15	3	Robert Chirchir	Kenya	1:49.52	
16	3	Mark Eplinius	Germany	1:49.54	
17	3	Andrea Longo	Italy	1:50.45	
18	3	Jean-Marc Destine	Haiti	1:51.59	

=== Final ===
Rank	Name	Nationality	Time	Notes
1st place, gold medalist(s)	Wilson Kipketer	Denmark	1:42.67	WR
2nd place, silver medalist(s)	Mahjoub Haida	Morocco	1:45.76	NR
3rd place, bronze medalist(s)	Rich Kenah	United States	1:46.16	PB
4	Nico Motchebon	Germany	1:46.19	SB
5	Marko Koers	Netherlands	1:46.43	PB
6	Einārs Tupurītis	Latvia	1:46.47	
