= 1998 European Athletics Championships – Men's 800 metres =

Men's 800 metres at the European Athletics Championships

The men's 800 metres at the 1998 European Athletics Championships was held at the Népstadion on 21, 22 and 23 August.

== Medalists ==
Gold	Nils Schumann; Germany
Silver	André Bucher; Switzerland
Bronze	Lukáš Vydra; Czech Republic

== Results ==
KEY:	q	Fastest non-qualifiers	Q	Qualified	NR	National record	PB	Personal best	SB	Seasonal best

=== Round 1 ===
Qualification: First 2 in each heat (Q) and the next 6 fastest (q) advance to the Semifinals.

Rank	Heat	Name	Nationality	Time	Notes
1	4	Nils Schumann	Germany	1:46.12	Q
2	4	Wilson Kipketer	Denmark	1:46.19	Q
3	2	James McIlroy	Ireland	1:46.81	Q
4	2	Giuseppe D'Urso	Italy	1:46.82	Q
5	2	Roberto Parra	Spain	1:46.91	q, SB
6	3	Nathan Kahan	Belgium	1:47.02	Q
7	3	André Bucher	Switzerland	1:47.05	Q
8	3	Wilson Kirwa	Finland	1:47.10	q
9	3	Ivan Komar	Belarus	1:47.14	q
10	3	Wojciech Kałdowski	Poland	1:47.17	q
11	1	Balázs Korányi	Hungary	1:47.32	Q
11	1	Andrea Longo	Italy	1:47.32	Q
13	3	David Matthews	Ireland	1:47.39	q
14	1	Nico Motchebon	Germany	1:47.40	q
15	4	Gert-Jan Liefers	Netherlands	1:47.57	
16	2	Viktors Lacis	Latvia	1:47.58	
17	4	Panagiotis Stroubakos	Greece	1:47.70	
18	2	Sergey Kozhevnikov	Russia	1:47.71	
19	1	Andrew Hart	Great Britain	1:47.90	
20	4	Aleksander Trutko	Belarus	1:48.19	
21	5	Lukáš Vydra	Czech Republic	1:48.20	Q
22	2	Balázs Tölgyesi	Hungary	1:48.29	
23	5	James Nolan	Ireland	1:48.36	Q
24	1	Duarte Ponte	Portugal	1:48.65	
25	5	Giacomo Mazzoni	Italy	1:48.74	
26	2	Vanco Stojanov	Macedonia	1:49.00	NR
27	4	Paweł Czapiewski	Poland	1:49.24	
28	5	Miklos Arpasi	Hungary	1:49.41	
29	1	Urmet Uusorg	Estonia	1:49.42	
30	5	Tarik Bourrouag	Germany	1:49.56	
31	4	Rizak Dirshe	Sweden	1:49.76	
32	5	José Antonio Redolat	Spain	1:49.86	
33	1	Víctor Martínez	Andorra	1:50.54	
34	5	David Divad	France	1:50.87	

=== Semifinals ===
Qualification: First 3 in each heat (Q) and the next 2 fastest (q) advance to the Final.

Rank	Heat	Name	Nationality	Time	Notes
1	1	Nils Schumann	Germany	1:47.28	Q
2	1	Lukáš Vydra	Czech Republic	1:47.62	Q
3	1	James McIlroy	Ireland	1:47.66	Q
4	1	Andrea Longo	Italy	1:47.67	q
5	2	André Bucher	Switzerland	1:47.68	Q
6	2	Balázs Korányi	Hungary	1:47.70	Q
7	2	Wilson Kipketer	Denmark	1:47.79	Q
8	1	Wojciech Kałdowski	Poland	1:48.10	q
9	2	Ivan Komar	Belarus	1:48.14	
10	1	Wilson Kirwa	Finland	1:48.19	
10	2	Nico Motchebon	Germany	1:48.19	
12	1	Nathan Kahan	Belgium	1:48.39	
13	2	James Nolan	Ireland	1:48.50	
14	2	Giuseppe D'Urso	Italy	1:48.95	
15	2	Roberto Parra	Spain	1:49.26	
16	1	David Matthews	Ireland	1:49.65	

=== Final ===
Rank	Name	Nationality	Time	Notes
1st place, gold medalist(s)	Nils Schumann	Germany	1:44.89	PB
2nd place, silver medalist(s)	André Bucher	Switzerland	1:45.04	
3rd place, bronze medalist(s)	Lukáš Vydra	Czech Republic	1:45.23	
4	James McIlroy	Ireland	1:45.46	
5	Balázs Korányi	Hungary	1:45.78	NR
6	Wojciech Kałdowski	Poland	1:46.60	PB
7	Andrea Longo	Italy	1:46.66	
8	Wilson Kipketer	Denmark	1:50.13	
