= Athletics at the 2004 Summer Olympics – Men's 800 metres =

Men's 800 metres at the Games of the XXVIII Olympiad
- Olympic Athletics
- Venue: Athens Olympic Stadium
- Dates: 25–28 August
- Competitors: 72 from 58 nations
- Winning time: 1:44.45

Medalists
1st place, gold medalist(s)		Yuriy Borzakovskiy; Russia
2nd place, silver medalist(s)		Mbulaeni Mulaudzi; South Africa
3rd place, bronze medalist(s)		Wilson Kipketer; Denmark

Video on YouTube Official Video

The men's 800 metres at the 2004 Summer Olympics as part of the athletics program was held at the Athens Olympic Stadium from August 25 to 28. Seventy-two athletes from 58 nations competed. The event was won by 0.16 seconds by Yuriy Borzakovskiy of Russia, the first medal for the nation in the event. Wilson Kipketer of Denmark became the 10th man to win a second medal in the 800 metres.

== Summary ==
The first round had split a full roster of runners into nine heats with the first two gaining a direct qualification and then the next six fastest across all heats advancing to the semifinals. The top two runners in each of the three semifinal heats moved on directly to the final, and they were immediately joined by the next two fastest from any of the semifinals.

The final was tactical, like the previous several Olympics with most athletes running faster to qualify than they ran in the final. Yuriy Borzakovskiy and Mouhssin Chehibi lagged significantly off the pace. World champion Djabir Saïd-Guerni and 2004 world leader Wilfred Bungei battled for the lead, chased closely by Bungei's second cousin, world record holder Wilson Kipketer, Borzakovskiy and Chehibi joined the back of the pack. It seemed like Borzakovskiy was reluctant to catch the leaders, then realized the pace was not too fast, with 50 metres before the end of the first lap, he noticeably accelerated from dead last to join the fight. Mbulaeni Mulaudzi, who had lucked into the slowest qualifying time in the semi-final round, ran comfortably in a box inside of Kipketer through 500 meters. A lead group broke away on the backstretch. Guerni fell back as the cousins battled for the lead through the final turn, with Mulaudzi a step back and Borzakovskiy the final athlete in the breakaway. Coming off the turn, Kipketer pounced and took off for the finish in lane two. But the always fast closing Borzakovskiy came along the outside from 5 meters back to catch Kipketer 30 meters out. Not giving up the fight, Mulaudzi pulled even with Kipketer. Borzakovskiy held his hands up with a meter victory, while Mulaudzi out leaned Kipketer for silver.

== Background ==
This was the 25th appearance of the event, which is one of 12 athletics events to have been held at every Summer Olympics. All of the finalists from 2000 returned except for the champion: silver medalist Wilson Kipketer of Denmark, bronze medalist Djabir Saïd-Guerni of Algeria, fourth-place finisher (and 1996 silver medalist) Hezekiél Sepeng of South Africa, fifth-place finisher André Bucher of Switzerland, sixth-place finisher Yuriy Borzakovskiy of Russia, seventh-place finisher Glody Dube of Botswana, and Andrea Longo of Italy, who had been disqualified in the final due to obstruction. The three latest world champions were Saïd-Guerni (2003), Bucher (2001), and Kipketer (1999, 1997, and 1995); Kipketer still held the world record. Borzakovskiy (2003 world runner-up) and Wilfred Bungei of Kenya (who held the #1 ranking) were also serious contenders for gold.

Bolivia, Bosnia and Herzegovina, Kazakhstan, Lithuania, Palestine, Turkmenistan, Ukraine, Uzbekistan, and Vietnam appeared in the event for the first time. Great Britain made its 24th appearance, most among all nations, having had no competitors in the event only in the 1904 Games in St. Louis.

== Qualification ==
The qualification period for athletics was 1 January 2003 to 9 August 2004. For the men's 800 metres, each National Olympic Committee was permitted to enter up to three athletes that had run the race in 1:46.00 or faster during the qualification period. If an NOC had no athletes that qualified under that standard, one athlete that had run the race in 1:47.00 or faster could be entered. The maximum number of athletes per nation had been set at 3 since the 1930 Olympic Congress.

== Competition format ==
The men's 800 metres had a much larger field (79 entered and 72 started, compared with 61 starters in 2000) but again used a three-round format, the most common format since 1912 though there had been variations. The "fastest loser" system introduced in 1964 was used for the first two rounds. There were nine first-round heats, each with 8 athletes; the top two runners in each heat as well as the next six fastest overall advanced to the semifinals. There were three semifinals with 8 athletes each (except that one had an extra runner due to an advancement by obstruction rule in the first round); the top two runners in each semifinal and the next two fastest overall advanced to the eight-man final.

== Records ==
Prior to the competition, the existing World record, Olympic record, and world leading time were as follows:

World record	Wilson Kipketer (DEN)	1:41.11	Cologne, Germany	24 August 1997
Olympic record	Vebjørn Rodal (NOR)	1:42.58	Atlanta, United States	29 July 1996
World Leading	Wilfred Bungei (KEN)	1:43.06	Zurich, Switzerland	6 August 2004

No new world or Olympic records were set during the competition. The following national records were established during the competition:

Nation	Athlete	Round	Time
Vietnam	Lê Văn Dương	Heat 2	1:49.81
Tanzania	Samwel Mwera	Heat 4	1:45.30

== Schedule ==
All times are Eastern European Summer Time (UTC+3)

Date	Time	Round
Wednesday, 25 August 2004	20:40	Round 1
Thursday, 26 August 2004	21:25	Semifinals
Saturday, 28 August 2004	20:50	Final

== Results ==
=== Round 1 ===
Qualification rule: The first two finishers in each heat (Q) plus the next six fastest overall runners (q) advanced to the semifinals.

==== Heat 1 ====
Rank	Lane	Athlete	Nation	Time	Notes
1	1	Mbulaeni Mulaudzi	South Africa	1:45.72	Q
2	5	René Herms	Germany	1:45.83	Q
3	2	Lee Jae-hun	South Korea	1:46.24	PB
4	6	Arthémon Hatungimana	Burundi	1:46.35	
5	8	Michael Rotich	Kenya	1:46.42	
6	7	Nazar Begliyev	Turkmenistan	1:49.64	PB
7	3	Alibay Shukurov	Azerbaijan	1:51.11	
8	4	Fadrique Iglesias	Bolivia	1:51.87	

==== Heat 2 ====
Rank	Lane	Athlete	Nation	Time	Notes
1	4	Joseph Mutua	Kenya	1:45.65	Q
2	3	Ricky Soos	Great Britain	1:45.70	Q, PB
3	8	Djabir Saïd-Guerni	Algeria	1:45.94	q
4	5	Achraf Tadili	Canada	1:46.63	
5	7	David Fiegen	Luxembourg	1:46.97	
6	2	Mindaugas Norbutas	Lithuania	1:47.38	SB
7	1	Panayiotis Stroubakos	Greece	1:47.69	
8	6	Lê Văn Dương	Vietnam	1:49.81	NR

==== Heat 3 ====
Rank	Lane	Athlete	Nation	Time	Notes
1	4	Wilson Kipketer	Denmark	1:44.69	Q
2	8	Jonathan Johnson	United States	1:45.31	Q
3	6	Jean-Patrick Nduwimana	Burundi	1:45.38	q
4	2	Osmar dos Santos	Brazil	1:45.90	q
5	3	Jason Stewart	New Zealand	1:46.24	PB
6	5	João Pires	Portugal	1:46.71	SB
7	7	Jasmin Salihović	Bosnia and Herzegovina	1:49.59	
8	1	Jan Sekpona	Togo	1:54.25	

==== Heat 4 ====
Rank	Lane	Athlete	Nation	Time	Notes
1	6	Wilfred Bungei	Kenya	1:44.84	Q
2	2	Ismail Ahmed Ismail	Sudan	1:45.17	Q, PB
3	3	Samwel Mwera	Tanzania	1:45.30	q, NR
4	5	Nicolas Aïssat	France	1:45.31	q
5	4	Bram Som	Netherlands	1:45.72	q
6	7	Mihail Kolganov	Kazakhstan	1:47.36	
7	1	Mohammad Al-Azemi	Kuwait	1:47.67	
8	8	Erkinjon Isakov	Uzbekistan	1:48.28	

==== Heat 5 ====
Rank	Lane	Athlete	Nation	Time	Notes
1	5	Yuriy Borzakovskiy	Russia	1:46.20	Q
2	3	Berhanu Alemu	Ethiopia	1:46.26	Q
3	6	Miguel Quesada	Spain	1:46.32	
4	8	Joeri Jansen	Belgium	1:46.66	
5	2	Paskar Owor	Uganda	1:47.87	
6	1	Moise Joseph	Haiti	1:48.15	
7	4	Isireli Naikelekelevesi	Fiji	1:49.08	
8	7	Kondwani Chiwina	Malawi	1:49.87	PB

==== Heat 6 ====
Rank	Lane	Athlete	Nation	Time	Notes
1	2	Amine Laâlou	Morocco	1:45.88	Q
2	8	Ivan Heshko	Ukraine	1:45.92	Q, SB
3	5	Khadevis Robinson	United States	1:46.14	
4	6	Dmitriy Bogdanov	Russia	1:47.03	
5	3	Nabil Madi	Algeria	1:47.52	
6	4	Selahattin Çobanoğlu	Turkey	1:47.83	
7	1	Sajjad Moradi	Iran	1:49.49	
8	7	Andy Grant	Saint Vincent and the Grenadines	1:57.08	

==== Heat 7 ====
Rank	Lane	Athlete	Nation	Time	Notes
1	2	Dmitrijs Miļkevičs	Latvia	1:46.66	Q
2	6	Antonio Manuel Reina	Spain	1:46.66	Q
3	4	Florent Lacasse	France	1:46.91	
4	8	Majed Saeed Sultan	Qatar	1:47.92	
5	1	Abdoulaye Wagne	Senegal	1:47.95	
6	7	Mohammed Al-Salhi	Saudi Arabia	1:48.42	SB
7	3	Ramil Aritkulov	Russia	1:49.25	
8	5	Ali Mohamed Al-Balooshi	United Arab Emirates	1:51.76	

==== Heat 8 ====
Rank	Lane	Athlete	Nation	Time	Notes
1	6	Andrea Longo	Italy	1:46.75	Q
2	8	Hezekiél Sepeng	South Africa	1:46.82	Q
3	7	André Bucher	Switzerland	1:47.34	
4	3	Manuel Olmedo	Spain	1:47.71	
5	5	Michal Šneberger	Czech Republic	1:47.89	
6	1	Sherridan Kirk	Trinidad and Tobago	1:48.12	
7	4	Vančo Stojanov	Macedonia	1:49.02	SB
8	2	Abdal Salam Al-Dabaji	Palestine	1:53.86	

==== Heat 9 ====
Rank	Lane	Athlete	Nation	Time	Notes
1	3	Gary Reed	Canada	1:46.74	Q
2	8	Mouhssin Chehibi	Morocco	1:46.77	Q
3	2	Yusuf Saad Kamel	Bahrain	1:46.94	
4	5	Derrick Peterson	United States	1:47.60	
5	4	Glody Dube	Botswana	1:48.25	
6	1	Prince Mumba	Zambia	1:48.36	
7	6	Byron Piedra	Ecuador	1:48.42	
8	7	Cornelis Sibe	Suriname	2:00.06	

=== Semifinals ===
Qualification rule: The top two finishers in each heat (Q) plus the next two fastest overall runners (q) advanced to the final.

==== Semifinal 1 ====
Rank	Lane	Athlete	Nation	Time	Notes
1	3	Djabir Saïd-Guerni	Algeria	1:45.76	Q
2	8	Mbulaeni Mulaudzi	South Africa	1:46.09	Q
3	6	Antonio Manuel Reina	Spain	1:46.17	
4	7	Ivan Heshko	Ukraine	1:46.66	
5	2	Nicolas Aïssat	France	1:47.14	
6	1	Berhanu Alemu	Ethiopia	1:47.40	
7	5	Amine Laâlou	Morocco	1:47.53	
8	4	René Herms	Germany	1:47.68	

==== Semifinal 2 ====
Rank	Lane	Athlete	Nation	Time	Notes
1	6	Wilfred Bungei	Kenya	1:44.28	Q
2	3	Yuriy Borzakovskiy	Russia	1:44.29	Q
3	7	Mouhssin Chehibi	Morocco	1:44.62	q, PB
4	4	Hezekiél Sepeng	South Africa	1:44.75	q
5	1	Bram Som	Netherlands	1:45.52	
6	2	Dmitrijs Miļkevičs	Latvia	1:46.62	
7	5	Gary Reed	Canada	1:47.38	
—	8	Samwel Mwera	Tanzania	DSQ	

==== Semifinal 3 ====
Rank	Lane	Athlete	Nation	Time	Notes
1	4	Wilson Kipketer	Denmark	1:44.63	Q
2	1	Ismail Ahmed Ismail	Sudan	1:45.45	Q
3	5	Joseph Mutua	Kenya	1:45.54	
4	3	Andrea Longo	Italy	1:45.97	
5	2	Jean-Patrick Nduwimana	Burundi	1:46.15	
6	8	Ricky Soos	Great Britain	1:46.74	
7	7	Osmar dos Santos	Brazil	1:48.23	
8	6	Jonathan Johnson	United States	1:50.10	

=== Final ===
Rank	Lane	Athlete	Nation	Time	Notes
1st place, gold medalist(s)	4	Yuriy Borzakovskiy	Russia	1:44.45	
2nd place, silver medalist(s)	2	Mbulaeni Mulaudzi	South Africa	1:44.61	SB
3rd place, bronze medalist(s)	6	Wilson Kipketer	Denmark	1:44.65	
4	8	Mouhssin Chehibi	Morocco	1:45.16	
5	5	Wilfred Bungei	Kenya	1:45.31	
6	3	Hezekiél Sepeng	South Africa	1:45.53	
7	1	Djabir Saïd-Guerni	Algeria	1:45.61	
8	7	Ismail Ahmed Ismail	Sudan	1:52.49	
