= Athletics at the 1999 Pan American Games – Men's 800 metres =

Men's 800 metres at the Pan American Games

The men's 800 metres event at the 1999 Pan American Games was held on the weekend of July 24th through 25th.

== Medalists ==
Gold	Silver	Bronze
Johnny Gray; United States	Norberto Téllez; Cuba	Zach Whitmarsh; Canada

== Results ==
=== Heats ===
Qualification: First 2 of each heat (Q) and the next 2 fastest (q) qualified for the final.

Rank	Heat	Name	Nationality	Time	Notes
1	1	Johnny Gray	United States	1:47.07	Q
2	1	Norberto Téllez	Cuba	1:47.35	Q
3	1	Mario Vernon-Watson	Jamaica	1:47.64	Q
3	2	Trinity Townsend	United States	1:47.64	Q
5	2	Zach Whitmarsh	Canada	1:47.73	Q
6	2	Kenroy Levy	Jamaica	1:47.91	Q
7	2	Ian Roberts	Guyana	1:48.13	q
8	1	Darryl Fillion	Canada	1:48.52	q
9	2	Milton Browne	Barbados	1:48.71	
10	1	Danielo Estefan	Uruguay	1:50.94	
11	2	Terrance Armstrong	Bermuda	1:51.09	
12	2	Chris Brown	Bahamas	1:51.91	
	1	Jean-Marc Destine	Haiti	DNF	
	1	Hudson de Souza	Brazil	DNS	

=== Final ===
Rank	Name	Nationality	Time	Notes
1st place, gold medalist(s)	Johnny Gray	United States	1:45.38	GR
2nd place, silver medalist(s)	Norberto Téllez	Cuba	1:45.40	
3rd place, bronze medalist(s)	Zach Whitmarsh	Canada	1:45.94	
4	Kenroy Levy	Jamaica	1:46.86	
5	Darryl Fillion	Canada	1:47.63	
6	Mario Vernon-Watson	Jamaica	1:48.19	
7	Trinity Townsend	United States	1:51.88	
8	Ian Roberts	Guyana	2:13.22	
