= 1999 European Athletics U23 Championships – Men's 800 metres =

The men's 800 metres event at the 1999 European Athletics U23 Championships was held in Gothenburg, Sweden, at Ullevi on 30 July and 1 August 1999.

== Medalists ==
Gold	Nils Schumann; Germany
Silver	James Nolan; Ireland
Bronze	Paweł Czapiewski; Poland

== Results ==
=== Final ===
1 August

Rank	Name	Nationality	Time	Notes
1st place, gold medalist(s)	Nils Schumann	Germany	1:45.21	CR
2nd place, silver medalist(s)	James Nolan	Ireland	1:46.94	
3rd place, bronze medalist(s)	Paweł Czapiewski	Poland	1:46.98	
4	Roman Oravec	Czech Republic	1:47.02	
5	João Pires	Portugal	1:47.83	
6	Viktors Lācis	Latvia	1:48.33	
7	Pavel Pelepyagin	Belarus	1:51.15	
8	Rickard Pell	Sweden	1:55.69	

=== Heats ===
30 July
Qualified: first 2 in each heat and 2 best to the Final

==== Heat 1 ====
Rank	Name	Nationality	Time	Notes
1	Pavel Pelepyagin	Belarus	1:47.82	Q
2	Roman Oravec	Czech Republic	1:47.86	Q
3	Paweł Czapiewski	Poland	1:47.96	q
4	Neil Speaight	United Kingdom	1:48.42	
5	Tobias Dertmann	Germany	1:48.53	
6	Ramon Wächter	Switzerland	1:49.39	
7	Daniel Oniciuc	Romania	1:50.34	
8	Roman Hanzel	Slovakia	1:53.56	

==== Heat 2 ====
Rank	Name	Nationality	Time	Notes
1	James Nolan	Ireland	1:48.45	Q
2	Viktors Lācis	Latvia	1:48.82	Q
3	Aleksandr Trutko	Belarus	1:49.34	
4	Vanco Stojanov	North Macedonia	1:49.66	
5	Steve Gurnham	Switzerland	1:49.74	
6	Andriy Tverdostup	Ukraine	1:51.24	
7	Grant Cuddy	United Kingdom	1:52.12	
8	René Breitenstein	Germany	1:57.63	

==== Heat 3 ====
Rank	Name	Nationality	Time	Notes
1	Nils Schumann	Germany	1:47.09	Q
2	João Pires	Portugal	1:48.06	Q
3	Rickard Pell	Sweden	1:48.19	q
4	Israel Domínguez	Spain	1:48.98	
5	Alasdair Donaldson	United Kingdom	1:49.18	
6	Jan Verner	Czech Republic	1:49.60	
7	Dalibor Balgač	Croatia	1:49.72	
8	Tim Rogge	Belgium	1:50.64	

== Participation ==
According to an unofficial count, 24 athletes from 17 countries participated in the event.

- Belarus (2)
- Belgium (1)
- Croatia (1)
- Czech Republic (2)
- Germany (3)
- Ireland (1)
- Latvia (1)
- North Macedonia (1)
- Poland (1)
- Portugal (1)
- Romania (1)
- Slovakia (1)
- Spain (1)
- Sweden (1)
- Switzerland (2)
- Ukraine (1)
- United Kingdom (3)
