= 1994 World Junior Championships in Athletics – Men's 800 metres =

The men's 800 metres event at the 1994 World Junior Championships in Athletics was held in Lisbon, Portugal, at Estádio Universitário de Lisboa on 20, 21 and 22 July.

== Medalists ==
Gold	Paul Byrne; Australia
Silver	Japheth Kimutai; Kenya
Bronze	Alain Miranda; Cuba

== Results ==
=== Final ===
22 July

Rank	Name	Nationality	Time	Notes
1st place, gold medalist(s)	Paul Byrne	Australia	1:47.42	
2nd place, silver medalist(s)	Japheth Kimutai	Kenya	1:48.22	
3rd place, bronze medalist(s)	Alain Miranda	Cuba	1:48.24	
4	Julius Achon	Uganda	1:48.85	
5	Peter Biwott	Kenya	1:49.09	
6	Bekele Banbere	Ethiopia	1:49.63	
7	David Krummenacker	United States	1:49.80	
8	Abdul Rahman Abdullah	Qatar	1:55.67	

=== Semifinals ===
21 July

==== Semifinal 1 ====
Rank	Name	Nationality	Time	Notes
1	Julius Achon	Uganda	1:51.20	Q
2	Bekele Banbere	Ethiopia	1:51.27	Q
3	Peter Biwott	Kenya	1:51.38	Q
4	Paul Byrne	Australia	1:51.52	Q
5	Andrea Longo	Italy	1:52.00	
6	Pieter van Tonder	South Africa	1:52.81	
	Eddie King	United Kingdom	DNF	
	Mark Griffin	United Kingdom	DNS	

==== Semifinal 2 ====
Rank	Name	Nationality	Time	Notes
1	Japheth Kimutai	Kenya	1:48.07	Q
2	Alain Miranda	Cuba	1:48.21	Q
3	Abdul Rahman Abdullah	Qatar	1:49.97	Q
4	David Krummenacker	United States	1:50.71	Q
5	Jean-Gilles Talin	France	1:51.82	
6	Thomas Bobbert	Germany	1:52.41	
7	Mengesha Feyesa	Ethiopia	1:52.65	
	Roberto Parra	Spain	DNF	

=== Heats ===
20 July

==== Heat 1 ====
Rank	Name	Nationality	Time	Notes
1	Roberto Parra	Spain	1:50.24	Q
2	Peter Biwott	Kenya	1:50.25	Q
3	James Klein	United States	1:51.46	
4	António Horbach	Brazil	1:51.65	
5	Nuno Lopes	Portugal	1:52.32	
6	Purevsuren Puntsag-Osor	Mongolia	1:54.44	
	Emanuel Andrade	Cape Verde	DNF	

==== Heat 2 ====
Rank	Name	Nationality	Time	Notes
1	Alain Miranda	Cuba	1:52.35	Q
2	Andrea Longo	Italy	1:52.66	Q
3	Javier Moro	Spain	1:52.85	
4	Heath Fitzpatrick	Australia	1:53.12	
5	Vane Stojanov	North Macedonia	1:53.38	
6	Alexis Sharangabo	Burundi	1:56.06	
7	Ali Moubarak	United Arab Emirates	2:01.60	

==== Heat 3 ====
Rank	Name	Nationality	Time	Notes
1	Paul Byrne	Australia	1:51.38	Q
2	Eddie King	United Kingdom	1:51.48	Q
3	Nick Burrow	New Zealand	1:52.58	
4	Stephan Kreykamp	Netherlands	1:52.61	
5	Clyde Colenso	South Africa	1:53.63	
6	Andrej Šljivic	Yugoslavia	1:53.94	
7	Liam Byrne	Gibraltar	1:56.02	

==== Heat 4 ====
Rank	Name	Nationality	Time	Notes
1	Mark Griffin	United Kingdom	1:49.27	Q
2	Pieter van Tonder	South Africa	1:50.06	Q
3	Jean-Gilles Talin	France	1:50.24	q
4	Felix Leiter	Germany	1:50.95	
5	Ludo Verhaeghe	Belgium	1:51.83	
6	Gilbert Mvuyikuri	Burundi	1:52.01	
7	Frank Paaga	American Samoa	2:26.71	

==== Heat 5 ====
Rank	Name	Nationality	Time	Notes
1	Julius Achon	Uganda	1:49.54	Q
2	Abdul Rahman Abdullah	Qatar	1:49.58	Q
3	Mengesha Feyesa	Ethiopia	1:49.84	q
4	Thomas Bobbert	Germany	1:49.92	q
5	David Krummenacker	United States	1:50.23	q
6	Martin Jareš	Czech Republic	1:51.39	
7	Anthony Quan	Guam	1:56.59	

==== Heat 6 ====
Rank	Name	Nationality	Time	Notes
1	Japheth Kimutai	Kenya	1:49.38	Q
2	Bekele Banbere	Ethiopia	1:49.61	Q
3	Tomohiro Kitamura	Japan	1:51.92	
4	Salih Çakir	Turkey	1:52.09	
5	Márcio da Silva	Brazil	1:53.33	
6	Tenzin Yunda Yunda	Zambia	1:56.72	
7	Casimiro Nse	Equatorial Guinea	1:58.25	
8	Chukh Ould Kouwemil	Mauritania	2:03.78	

== Participation ==
According to an unofficial count, 43 athletes from 33 countries participated in the event.

- American Samoa (1)
- Australia (2)
- Belgium (1)
- Brazil (2)
- Burundi (2)
- Cape Verde (1)
- Cuba (1)
- Czech Republic (1)
- Equatorial Guinea (1)
- Ethiopia (2)
- France (1)
- Germany (2)
- Gibraltar (1)
- Guam (1)
- Italy (1)
- Japan (1)
- Kenya (2)
- North Macedonia (1)
- Mauritania (1)
- Mongolia (1)
- Netherlands (1)
- New Zealand (1)
- Portugal (1)
- Qatar (1)
- South Africa (2)
- Spain (2)
- Turkey (1)
- Uganda (1)
- United Arab Emirates (1)
- United Kingdom (2)
- United States (2)
- Yugoslavia (1)
- Zambia (1)
