= 1996 World Junior Championships in Athletics – Men's 800 metres =

The men's 800 metres event at the 1996 World Junior Championships in Athletics was held in Sydney, Australia, at International Athletic Centre on 21, 22 and 23 August.

== Medalists ==
Gold	Joseph Mutua; Kenya
Silver	Tom Lerwill; United Kingdom
Bronze	Grant Cremer; Australia

== Results ==
=== Final ===
23 August

Rank	Name	Nationality	Time	Notes
1st place, gold medalist(s)	Joseph Mutua	Kenya	1:48.21	
2nd place, silver medalist(s)	Tom Lerwill	United Kingdom	1:48.40	
3rd place, bronze medalist(s)	Grant Cremer	Australia	1:48.46	
4	Japheth Kimutai	Kenya	1:48.97	
5	Nils Schumann	Germany	1:49.44	
6	Viktors Lācis	Latvia	1:50.11	
7	Zach Whitmarsh	Canada	1:50.26	
8	James Nolan	Ireland	1:51.88	

=== Semifinals ===
22 August

==== Semifinal 1 ====
Rank	Name	Nationality	Time	Notes
1	Japheth Kimutai	Kenya	1:45.63	Q
2	Tom Lerwill	United Kingdom	1:47.27	Q
3	Zach Whitmarsh	Canada	1:47.33	Q
4	James Nolan	Ireland	1:47.55	Q
5	Clyde Colenso	South Africa	1:47.84	
6	Hirohisa Muramatsu	Japan	1:48.65	
7	Abdul Rahman Abdullah	Qatar	1:49.88	
8	Roman Hanzel	Slovakia	1:53.02	

==== Semifinal 2 ====
Rank	Name	Nationality	Time	Notes
1	Grant Cremer	Australia	1:48.72	Q
2	Viktors Lācis	Latvia	1:48.91	Q
3	Nils Schumann	Germany	1:48.98	Q
4	Joseph Mutua	Kenya	1:49.21	Q
5	Kazutomo Iwasaki	Japan	1:49.32	
6	Tim Rogge	Belgium	1:49.46	
7	Roman Oravec	Czech Republic	1:50.23	
8	Jean-Patrick Nduwimana	Burundi	1:50.50	

=== Heats ===
21 August

==== Heat 1 ====
Rank	Name	Nationality	Time	Notes
1	Roman Oravec	Czech Republic	1:52.88	Q
2	Hirohisa Muramatsu	Japan	1:53.38	Q
3	Reuben Silwimba	Zambia	1:53.99	
4	Youcef Abdi	Algeria	1:54.12	
5	Moses Kavuma	Uganda	1:54.69	
6	Momodou Lamin Drammeh	Gambia	1:55.09	
7	Kuripitone Betham	Western Samoa	2:01.75	

==== Heat 2 ====
Rank	Name	Nationality	Time	Notes
1	James Nolan	Ireland	1:49.02	Q
2	Tom Lerwill	United Kingdom	1:49.22	Q
3	Zach Whitmarsh	Canada	1:49.33	q
4	Tim Rogge	Belgium	1:49.47	q
5	Juan Delgado	Spain	1:50.26	
6	István Nagy	Hungary	1:50.64	
7	Lkhagvasuren Choisuren	Mongolia	2:11.85	
	Nhlanhla Dlamini	Swaziland	DQ	(163.3)

==== Heat 3 ====
Rank	Name	Nationality	Time	Notes
1	Jean-Patrick Nduwimana	Burundi	1:51.05	Q
2	Nils Schumann	Germany	1:51.27	Q
3	Robert True	United States	1:51.68	
4	Said Basweidan	Yemen	1:52.21	
5	Meelis Tammre	Estonia	1:52.83	
6	Vane Stojanov	North Macedonia	1:53.20	
7	Chris Votu	Solomon Islands	2:06.21	

==== Heat 4 ====
Rank	Name	Nationality	Time	Notes
1	Japheth Kimutai	Kenya	1:47.89	Q
2	Abdul Rahman Abdullah	Qatar	1:49.95	Q
3	Israel Domínguez	Spain	1:51.91	
4	Clyde McIntosh	New Zealand	1:52.17	
5	Paweł Czapiewski	Poland	1:53.02	
6	Davi de Jesús	Brazil	1:53.49	
7	Mohamed Yagoub	Sudan	1:55.34	

==== Heat 5 ====
Rank	Name	Nationality	Time	Notes
1	Clyde Colenso	South Africa	1:48.83	Q
2	Grant Cremer	Australia	1:48.84	Q
3	Viktors Lācis	Latvia	1:49.06	q
4	Kazutomo Iwasaki	Japan	1:49.33	q
5	Roman Tarasov	Russia	1:53.04	
6	Péter Berezvai	Hungary	1:53.36	
7	Lionel Barranco	Turks and Caicos Islands	2:06.73	
8	David Dexter	Vanuatu	2:11.15	

==== Heat 6 ====
Rank	Name	Nationality	Time	Notes
1	Joseph Mutua	Kenya	1:49.99	Q
2	Roman Hanzel	Slovakia	1:50.81	Q
3	Robin Martin	United States	1:51.33	
4	Djabir Saïd-Guerni	Algeria	1:52.06	
5	Werner Botha	South Africa	1:52.83	
6	Craig Wood	Australia	1:53.27	
7	Rickard Pell	Sweden	1:57.01	
8	Henele Taliai	Tonga	2:05.97	

== Participation ==
According to an unofficial count, 45 athletes from 37 countries participated in the event.

- Algeria (2)
- Australia (2)
- Belgium (1)
- Brazil (1)
- Burundi (1)
- Canada (1)
- Czech Republic (1)
- Estonia (1)
- Gambia (1)
- Germany (1)
- Hungary (2)
- Ireland (1)
- Japan (2)
- Kenya (2)
- Latvia (1)
- North Macedonia (1)
- Mongolia (1)
- New Zealand (1)
- Poland (1)
- Qatar (1)
- Russia (1)
- Slovakia (1)
- Solomon Islands (1)
- South Africa (2)
- Spain (2)
- Sudan (1)
- Swaziland (1)
- Sweden (1)
- Tonga (1)
- Turks and Caicos Islands (1)
- Uganda (1)
- United Kingdom (1)
- United States (2)
- Vanuatu (1)
- Western Samoa (1)
- Yemen (1)
- Zambia (1)
