= 1994 World Junior Championships in Athletics – Men's 1500 metres =

The men's 1500 metres event at the 1994 World Junior Championships in Athletics was held in Lisbon, Portugal, at Estádio Universitário de Lisboa on 23 and 24 July.

== Medalists ==
Gold	Julius Achon; Uganda
Silver	André Bucher; Switzerland
Bronze	Philip Mosima; Kenya

== Results ==
=== Final ===
24 July

Rank	Name	Nationality	Time	Notes
1st place, gold medalist(s)	Julius Achon	Uganda	3:39.78	
2nd place, silver medalist(s)	André Bucher	Switzerland	3:40.46	
3rd place, bronze medalist(s)	Philip Mosima	Kenya	3:41.09	
4	Reyes Estévez	Spain	3:42.98	
5	Mike Power	Australia	3:43.86	
6	Paul Cleary	Australia	3:44.64	
7	Alexandru Vasile	Romania	3:44.78	
8	Bruno Witchalls	United Kingdom	3:45.11	
9	Mauro Casagrande	Italy	3:45.29	
10	Elijah Maru	Kenya	3:45.53	
11	Ali Hakimi	Tunisia	3:45.66	
12	José Azevedo	Portugal	4:03.15	

=== Heats ===
23 July

==== Heat 1 ====
Rank	Name	Nationality	Time	Notes
1	Philip Mosima	Kenya	3:46.46	Q
2	Julius Achon	Uganda	3:47.35	Q
3	Paul Cleary	Australia	3:47.76	Q
4	Mauro Casagrande	Italy	3:47.87	Q
5	Bruno Witchalls	United Kingdom	3:48.20	q
6	Bashir Boushra	Qatar	3:49.68	
7	Luboš Pokorný	Czech Republic	3:51.68	
8	Márcio da Silva	Brazil	3:51.94	
9	Ivan Manjon	Spain	3:53.22	
10	Gilbert Mvuyikuri	Burundi	3:53.33	
11	Ciprian Bolintinescu	Romania	3:54.27	
12	Tenzin Yunda Yunda	Zambia	3:57.85	
	Bekele Banbere	Ethiopia	DNF	

==== Heat 2 ====
Rank	Name	Nationality	Time	Notes
1	Reyes Estévez	Spain	3:46.24	Q
2	André Bucher	Switzerland	3:46.27	Q
3	Mike Power	Australia	3:46.49	Q
4	Ali Hakimi	Tunisia	3:46.53	Q
5	Alexandru Vasile	Romania	3:46.67	q
6	José Azevedo	Portugal	3:48.21	q
7	Elijah Maru	Kenya	3:48.22	q
8	Sami Ylihärsilä	Finland	3:48.36	
9	Karl Paranya	United States	3:50.36	
10	Salih Çakir	Turkey	3:51.15	
11	Tesfaye Roba	Ethiopia	3:51.18	
12	Neil Caddy	United Kingdom	3:51.43	
13	Alexis Sharangabo	Burundi	3:51.60	

== Participation ==
According to an unofficial count, 26 athletes from 19 countries participated in the event.

- Australia (2)
- Brazil (1)
- Burundi (2)
- Czech Republic (1)
- Ethiopia (2)
- Finland (1)
- Italy (1)
- Kenya (2)
- Portugal (1)
- Qatar (1)
- Romania (2)
- Spain (2)
- Switzerland (1)
- Tunisia (1)
- Turkey (1)
- Uganda (1)
- United Kingdom (2)
- United States (1)
- Zambia (1)
