= Jean-Patrick Nduwimana =

Burundian middle-distance runner

Personal information
- Born: 9 May 1978 (age 48)

Sport
- Sport: Track and field

Jean-Patrick Nduwimana (born 9 May 1978) is a Burundian middle-distance runner who specializes in the 800 metres.

Competing for the Arizona Wildcats track and field team, he won two NCAA DI national championships in the 800 m.

In 2001 he won a silver medal at the Goodwill Games in Brisbane and a bronze at the IAAF Grand Prix Final. He competed at the Olympic Games in 2000 and 2004 without reaching the final.

His personal best is 1:42.81 minutes, achieved in August 2001 in Zürich. This is the current Burundian record. He also holds the Burundian 400 metres record with 46.32 seconds.

== Competition record ==
Year	Competition	Venue	Position	Event	Notes
Representing Burundi
1996	World Junior Championships	Sydney, Australia	15th (sf)	800 m	1:50.50
1999	World Indoor Championships	Maebashi, Japan	3rd (sf)	800 m	1:46.80
1999	Universiade	Palma de Mallorca, Spain	10th (sf)	800 m	1:48.40
1999	World Championships	Seville, Spain	22nd (sf)	800 m	1:48.91
2000	Olympic Games	Sydney, Australia	17th (sf)	800 m	1:46.98
2001	World Championships	Edmonton, Canada	11th (sf)	800 m	1:46.42
2001	Goodwill Games	Brisbane, Australia	2nd	800 m	1:46.79
2003	World Championships	Paris, France	38th (h)	800 m	1:48.40
2004	World Indoor Championships	Budapest, Hungary	17th (sf)	800 m	1:52.20
2004	Olympic Games	Athens, Greece	12th (sf)	800 m	1:46.15
