= Grant Cremer =

Australian middle-distance runner

Personal information
- Born: 9 June 1978 (age 48) Sydney, Australia

Sport
- Sport: Track and field
Medal record
Representing Australia
World Junior Championships
| Bronze medal – third place | 1996 Sydney | 800m |

Grant Cremer (born 9 June 1978 in Sydney) is a retired Australian middle-distance runner who specialised in the 800 metres. He competed at the 2000 Summer Olympics, which took place in his native Sydney, reaching the semifinals.

He has personal bests of 1:45.21 in the 800 metres (1999) and 2:16.61 in the 1000 metres (2000). The latter was the previous standing national record before Peter Bol set a new national record at the Tokyo Olympics.

== Competition record ==
| Year | Competition | Venue | Position | Event | Notes |
Representing Australia
| 1996 | World Junior Championships | Sydney, Australia | 3rd | 800 m | 1:48.46 |
| 1999 | Universiade | Palma de Mallorca, Spain | 5th | 800 m | 1:46.97 |
| 1999 | World Championships | Seville, Spain | 20th (sf) | 800 m | 1:48.22 |
| 2000 | Olympic Games | Sydney, Australia | 25th (sf) | 800 m | 1:52.57 |
| 2001 | Goodwill Games | Brisbane, Australia | 6th | 800 m | 1:47.64 |
