= Faiq Bağırov =

Azerbaijani middle-distance runner (born 1976)

Personal information
- Nationality: Azerbaijani
- Born: 3 February 1976 (age 50)

Sport
- Sport: Middle-distance running
- Event: 800 metres

Faiq Bağırov (born 3 February 1976) is an Azerbaijani middle-distance runner. He competed in the men's 800 metres at the 2000 Summer Olympics.
