= Marvin Watts =

Jamaican runner

Personal information
- Born: 21 May 1975 (age 51) Kingston, Jamaica

Sport
- Sport: Track and field
Medal record
Representing Jamaica
Central American and Caribbean Games
Bronze medal – third place	2002 San Salvador	800m

Marvin Watts (born 21 May 1975) is a retired Jamaican athlete who specialised in the 800 metres. He won several medals at the regional level. He competed at the 2000 Summer Olympics reaching semifinals.

His personal best in the event is 1:46.43 from 2001.

== Competition record ==
Year	Competition	Venue	Position	Event	Notes
Representing Jamaica
1994	Central American and Caribbean Junior Championships (U20)	Port of Spain, Trinidad and Tobago	3rd	800 m	1:53.6
1998	Central American and Caribbean Games	Maracaibo, Venezuela	8th	800 m	2:00.77
1998	Commonwealth Games	Kuala Lumpur, Malaysia	12th (sf)	800 m	1:48.40
2000	Olympic Games	Sydney, Australia	20th (sf)	800 m	1:47.68
2001	Central American and Caribbean Championships	Guatemala City, Guatemala	2nd	800 m	1:47.14
2001	World Championships	Edmonton, Canada	15th (sf)	800 m	1:47.64
2002	Central American and Caribbean Games	San Salvador, El Salvador	3rd	800 m	1:49.11
2002	Commonwealth Games	Manchester, United Kingdom	21st (h)	800 m	1:51.39
2003	Central American and Caribbean Championships	St. George's, Grenada	3rd	800 m	1:49.48
2003	Pan American Games	Santo Domingo, Dom. Rep.	7th	800 m	1:48.98
