= Joseph Mutua =

Kenyan middle-distance runner

Joseph Mwengi Mutua (born 10 December 1978 in Machakos, Eastern Province) is a former Kenyan runner who specialized in the 800 metres.

His personal best time is 1:43.33 minutes, achieved in August 2002 in Zürich. He holds the African indoor record in 800 m with 1:44.71 minutes, achieved in January 2004 in Stuttgart.

He twice competed at the Summer Olympics. In 2000, he failed to advance 800 metres heats, but was part of the Kenyan 4*400m relay team that reached semifinals. At the 2004 Summer Olympics, he reached 800 metres semifinals.

He won the Kenyan national championships in 2002, 2003 and 2004.

He was part of the 4 × 800 m relay team who currently holds the world record.

== Achievements ==
Year	Competition	Venue	Position	Event	Notes
Representing Kenya
1996	World Junior Championships	Sydney, Australia	1st	800m	1:48.21
1996	World Junior Championships	Sydney, Australia	8th	4 × 400 m relay	3:09.04
2001	Grand Prix Final	Melbourne, Australia	5th	800 m	1:47.09
2002	Commonwealth Games	Manchester, England	2nd	800 m	1:46.57
2003	Military World Games	Catania, Italy	1st	800 m	1:48.84
2003	World Athletics Final	Monte Carlo, Monaco	2nd	800 m	1:46.13
2004	World Indoor Championships	Budapest, Hungary	6th	800 m	1:47.86
2004	World Athletics Final	Monte Carlo, Monaco	2nd	800 m	1:46.13
