= Zach Whitmarsh =

Canadian athlete (born 1977)

Personal information
- Born: April 5, 1977 (age 49) Victoria, British Columbia, Canada

Sport
- Sport: Track and field
Medal record
Men's Athletics
Representing Canada
Pan American Games
Bronze medal – third place	1999 Winnipeg	800 metres

Zachary Whitmarsh (born April 5, 1977) is a track and field athlete from Canada, who competes in the middle distance events. He represented his native country at the 2000 Summer Olympics, finishing in 39th place in the men's 800 metres. He won the bronze medal in the men's 800 metres at the 1999 Pan American Games in Winnipeg.

== Competition record ==
Year	Competition	Venue	Position	Event	Notes
Representing Canada
1995	Pan American Junior Championships	Santiago, Chile	1st	800 m	1:50.39
1995	Pan American Junior Championships	Santiago, Chile	4th	4 × 400 m relay	3:13.85
1996	World Junior Championships	Sydney, Australia	7th	800 m	1:50.26
1996	World Junior Championships	Sydney, Australia	10th (h)	4 × 400 m relay	3:12.03
1997	Jeux de la Francophonie	Antananarivo, Madagascar	2nd	800 m	1:48.02
1999	Pan American Games	Winnipeg, Canada	3rd	800 m	1:45.94
1999	World Championships	Seville, Spain	23rd (h)	800 m	1:47.01
2000	Olympic Games	Sydney, Australia	39th (h)	800 m	1:48.42
2001	Jeux de la Francophonie	Ottawa, Canada	3rd	800 m	1:46.90
2002	Commonwealth Games	Manchester, United Kingdom	15th (sf)	800 m	1:49.61
