= Roman Oravec =

Czech middle-distance runner

Personal information
- Born: 5 April 1978 (age 48) Brno, Czechoslovakia

Sport
- Sport: Track and field
Medal record
Representing Czech Republic
Summer Universiade
Gold medal – first place	2003 Daegu	800m
European Junior Championships
Bronze medal – third place	1997 Ljubljana	800m

Roman Oravec (born 5 April 1978) is a Czech former middle distance runner who competed at the 2000 Summer Olympics.

Oravec was a six-time All-American for the SMU Mustangs track and field team, placing 3rd in the 800 m at the 1999 NCAA Division I Outdoor Track and Field Championships and 2000 NCAA Division I Indoor Track and Field Championships.

== Competition record ==
Year	Competition	Venue	Position	Event	Notes
Representing the Czech Republic
1996	World Junior Championships	Sydney, Australia	14th (sf)	800m	1:50.23
1997	World Indoor Championships	Paris, France	19th (h)	800 m	1:51.33
1997	European Junior Championships	Ljubljana, Slovenia	3rd	800 m	1:51.51
1997	Universiade	Catania, Italy	19th (sf)	800 m	1:50.38
1998	European Indoor Championships	Valencia, Spain	8th (sf)	800 m	1:50.16
1999	European U23 Championships	Gothenburg, Sweden	4th	800 m	1:47.02
1999	World Championships	Seville, Spain	7th (sf)	800 m	1:45.78
2000	European Indoor Championships	Ghent, Belgium	4th (sf)	800 m	1:50.33
2000	Olympic Games	Sydney, Australia	24th (h)	800 m	1:47.66
2002	European Indoor Championships	Vienna, Austria	5th (sf)	800 m	1:48.25
2003	World Indoor Championships	Birmingham, United Kingdom	10th (sf)	800 m	1:48.73
2003	Universiade	Daegu, South Korea	1st	800 m	1:48.01
