= Nicholas Wachira =

Kenyan middle-distance runner

Nicholas Wachira (born 19 November 1982) is a Kenyan former middle-distance runner who competed mostly in the 800 metres. He represented his country at the 2001 and 2003 World Championships reaching semifinals at both occasions. In addition, he won gold medals at the 1999 World Youth and 2000 World Junior Championships.

== Competition record ==
Year	Competition	Venue	Position	Event	Notes
Representing Kenya
1999	World Youth Championships	Bydgoszcz, Poland	6th (sf)	400 m	47.93
1999	World Youth Championships	Bydgoszcz, Poland	1st	800 m	1:50.70
2000	World Junior Championships	Santiago, Chile	1st	800m	1:47.16
2000	World Junior Championships	Santiago, Chile	10th (h)	4 × 400 m relay	3:11.17
2001	World Championships	Edmonton, Canada	16th (sf)	800 m	1:48.93
2002	African Championships	Radès, Tunisia	8th (h)	800 m	1:48.74
2003	World Championships	Paris, France	5th (h)	800 m	1:45.86

== Personal bests ==
Outdoor

- 400 metres – 47.93 (Bydgoszcz 1999)
- 800 metres – 1:44.34 (Nairobi 2003)
- 1000 metres – 2:18.13 (Nice 2001)
- 1500 metres – 3:38.44 (Zürich 2004)

Indoor

- 800 metres – 1:47.37 (Stuttgart 2003)
- 1000 metres – 2:23.64 (Boston 2004)
