= 1997 European Athletics Junior Championships =

- Level: Under 20
- Events: 43

The 1997 European Athletics Junior Championships were held in Ljubljana, Slovenia on July 24–27.

== Men's results ==
| Event | Gold | | Silver | | Bronze | |
|---|---|---|---|---|---|---|
| 100 m | Dwain Chambers; Great Britain | 10.06 | Christian Malcolm; Great Britain | 10.24 | Frédéric Krantz; France | 10.35 |
| 200 m | Christian Malcolm; Great Britain | 20.51 | Piotr Berestiuk; Poland | 20.91 | Mark Findlay; Great Britain | 20.99 |
| 400 m | David Canal; Spain | 46.04 | Periklis Iakovakis; Greece | 46.68 | David Naismith; Great Britain | 47.11 |
| 800 m | Nils Schumann; Germany | 1:51.00 | Robert Neryng; Poland | 1:51.45 | Roman Oravec; Czech Republic | 1:51.51 |
| 1500 m | Gert-Jan Liefers; Netherlands | 3:46.91 | Benjamin Hetzler; Germany | 3:48.15 | Gareth Turnbull; Ireland | 3:48.16 |
| 5000 m | Bouabdellah Tahri; France | 14:25.71 | Ferenc Békési; Hungary | 14:27.87 | Juan Carlos Higuero; Spain | 14:31.79 |
| 10,000 m | Ovidiu Tat; Romania | 29:56.35 | Mustafa Mohamed; Sweden | 30:04.33 | Jussi Utriainen; Finland | 30:23.02 |
| 3000 m steeplechase | Günther Weidlinger; Austria | 8:41.54 | Roman Usov; Russia | 8:48.47 | Antonio Martínez; Spain | 8:56.60 |
| 110 m hurdles | Tomasz Ścigaczewski; Poland | 13.55 | Stanislavs Olijars; Latvia | 13.74 | Jan Schindzielorz; Germany | 14.10 |
| 400 m hurdles | Boris Gorban; Russia | 50.95 | Aljoscha Nemitz; Germany | 51.08 | Boris Vazovan; Slovakia | 51.26 |
| 4 × 100 metres relay | Great Britain; Uvie Ugono; Mark Findlay; Christian Malcolm; Dwain Chambers | 39.62 | France; Vincent Caure; Frédéric Krantz; Didier Héry; Dimitri Demoniere | 39.89 | Germany; Thomas Hüttinger; Tim Studzinski; Thomas Zeimentz; Jirka Zapletal | 40.26 |
| 4 × 400 metres relay | Spain; Adrián Fernández; Luis María Flores; Alberto Martínez; David Canal | 3:08.18 | Greece; Evággelos Moustakidis; Yeóryios Ikonomídis; Ioánnis Lessis; Periklis Iakovakis | 3:08.29 | Great Britain; Lee Black; Michael Parper; Mark Rowlands; David Naismith | 3:08.97 |
| 10,000 m walk | Andrea Manfredini; Italy | 42:43.75 | André Höhne; Germany | 43:00.71 | Martin Pupiš; Slovakia | 43:11.53 |
| High jump | Hennazdy Maroz; Belarus | 2.20 m | Ben Challenger; Great Britain | 2.20 m | Aleksey Lesnichiy; Belarus | 2.17 m |
| Pole vault | Lars Börgeling; Germany | 5.40 m | Pavel Gerasimov; Russia | 5.30 m | Christian Linskey; Great Britain | 5.00 m |
| Long jump | Nathan Morgan; Great Britain | 7.90 m | Raúl Fernández; Spain | 7.90 m | Yann Domenech; France | 7.87 m |
| Triple jump | Viktor Gushchinskiy; Russia | 16.78 m | Ionut Punga; Romania | 16.43 m | Eduardo Pérez; Spain | 16.40 m |
| Shot put | Ralf Bartels; Germany | 18.30 m | Mikuláš Konopka; Slovakia | 17.63 m | Peter Sack; Germany | 17.23 m |
| Discus throw | Emeka Udechuku; Great Britain | 53.90 m | Patrick Stang; Germany | 53.02 m | Zoltán Kővágó; Hungary | 52.90 m |
| Hammer throw | Maciej Pałyszko; Poland | 74.12 m | Sergey Martemyanov; Belarus | 70.62 m | Olli-Pekka Karjalainen; Finland | 69.84 m |
| Javelin throw | Adrian Markowski; Poland | 78.42 m | Juha Aarnio; Finland | 77.60 m | Christian Fusenig; Germany | 75.86 m |
| Decathlon | Chiel Warners; Netherlands | 7664 pts | Steffen Munz; Germany | 7258 pts | Sebastian Knabe; Germany | 7218 pts |

== Women's results ==
| Event | Gold | | Silver | | Bronze | |
|---|---|---|---|---|---|---|
| 100 m | Johanna Manninen; Finland | 11.39 | Agné Visockaité; Lithuania | 11.42 | Erica Marchetti; Italy | 11.47 |
| 200 m | Sabrina Mulrain; Germany | 23.35 | Muriel Hurtis; France | 23.36 | Johanna Manninen; Finland | 23.43 |
| 400 m | Kristina Perica; Croatia | 53.07 | Alina Râpanu; Romania | 53.10 | Cindy Éga; France | 53.17 |
| 800 m | Anca Safta; Romania | 2:03.47 | Aleksandra Dereń; Poland | 2:03.70 | Miriam Mašeková; Slovakia | 2:06.17 |
| 1500 m | Natalya Yevdokimova; Ukraine | 4:23.34 | Małgorzata Bury; Poland | 4:24.37 | Ljiljana Ćulibrk; Croatia | 4:24.75 |
| 3000 m | Laura Suffa; Germany | 9:13.44 | Sonja Stolić; Yugoslavia | 9:15.45 | Sandra Levenez; France | 9:15.61 |
| 5000 m | Katalin Szentgyörgyi; Hungary | 16:38.73 | Tatyana Gerasimova; Russia | 16:39.31 | Ionela Bungardean; Romania | 16:39.97 |
| 100 m hurdles | Tatyana Mishakova; Russia | 13.49 | Éva Miklós; Romania | 13.81 | Hanna Korell; Finland | 13.92 |
| 400 m hurdles | Florence Delaune; France | 57.91 | Thelma Joziasse; Netherlands | 58.65 | Medina Tudor; Romania | 58.85 |
| 4 × 100 metres relay | Germany; Anne Reucher; Marion Wagner; Alice Reuss; Sabrina Mulrain | 44.24 | Great Britain; Rebecca Drummond; Sarah Wilhelmy; Melanie Purkiss; Tatum Nelson | 45.55 | Poland; Ewa Klarecka; Agnieszka Rysiukiewicz; Monika Giemzo; Anna Pacholak | 45.59 |
| 4 × 400 metres relay | France; Katiana Rene; Florence Delaune; Sylvanie Morandais; Cindy Ega | 3:33.73 | Hungary; Enikő Szabó; Renata Balazsic; Krisztina Doma; Barbara Petráhn | 3:34.90 | Germany; Kerstin Seitz; Jennifer Vollrath; Doreen Harstick; Claudia Marx | 3:34.94 |
| 5000 m walk | Claudia Iovan; Romania | 21:15.99 | Lyudmila Dedekina; Russia | 21:42.21 | Lyudmila Yefimkina; Russia | 22:04.11 |
| High jump | Linda Horvath; Austria | 1.92 m | Marina Kuptsova; Russia | 1.90 m | Svetlana Lapina; Russia | 1.90 m |
| Pole vault | Annika Becker; Germany | 4.00 m | Vala Flosadóttir; Iceland | 4.00 m | Monika Erlach; Austria | 3.95 m |
| Long jump | Aurélie Félix; France | 6.52 m | Sandra Stube; Germany | 6.50 m | Olivia Wöckinger; Austria | 6.47 m |
| Triple jump | Adelina Gavrilă; Romania | 13.58 m | Marija Martinović; Yugoslavia | 13.54 m | Diana Nikitina; Estonia | 13.45 m |
| Shot put | Yelena Ivanenko; Belarus | 17.05 m | Nadine Banse; Germany | 16.60 m | Assunta Legnante; Italy | 16.18 m |
| Discus throw | Lacramioara Ionescu; Romania | 52.54 m | Satu Järvenpää; Finland | 51.48 m | Philippa Roles; Great Britain | 50.62 m |
| Hammer throw | Kamila Skolimowska; Poland | 59.72 m | Sini Pöyry; Finland | 59.42 m | Susanne Keil; Germany | 59.22 m |
| Javelin throw | Nikolett Szabó; Hungary | 61.86 m | Sarah Walter; France | 57.34 m | Bina Ramesh; France | 55.78 m |
| Heptathlon | Saskia Meijer; Netherlands | 5882 pts | Yelena Chernyavskaya; Russia | 5827 pts | Sonja Kesselschläger; Germany | 5753 pts |

== Medal table ==
| Rank | Nation | Gold | Silver | Bronze | Total |
|---|---|---|---|---|---|
| 1 | Germany (GER) | 7 | 7 | 8 | 22 |
| 2 | Great Britain (GBR) | 5 | 3 | 5 | 13 |
| 3 | Romania (ROM) | 5 | 3 | 2 | 10 |
| 4 | Poland (POL) | 4 | 4 | 1 | 9 |
| 5 | France (FRA) | 4 | 3 | 5 | 12 |
| 6 | Russia (RUS) | 3 | 6 | 2 | 11 |
| 7 | Netherlands (NED) | 3 | 1 | 0 | 4 |
| 8 | Hungary (HUN) | 2 | 2 | 1 | 5 |
| 9 | Spain (ESP) | 2 | 1 | 3 | 6 |
| 10 | Belarus (BLR) | 2 | 1 | 1 | 4 |
| 11 | Austria (AUT) | 2 | 0 | 2 | 4 |
| 12 | Finland (FIN) | 1 | 3 | 4 | 8 |
| 13 | Italy (ITA) | 1 | 0 | 2 | 3 |
| 14 | Croatia (CRO) | 1 | 0 | 1 | 2 |
| 15 | Ukraine (UKR) | 1 | 0 | 0 | 1 |
| 16 | Greece (GRE) | 0 | 2 | 0 | 2 |
| 16 | Yugoslavia (FR Yugoslavia) | 0 | 2 | 0 | 2 |
| 18 | Slovakia (SVK) | 0 | 1 | 3 | 4 |
| 19 | Iceland (ISL) | 0 | 1 | 0 | 1 |
| 19 | Latvia (LAT) | 0 | 1 | 0 | 1 |
| 19 | Lithuania (LTU) | 0 | 1 | 0 | 1 |
| 19 | Sweden (SWE) | 0 | 1 | 0 | 1 |
| 23 | Czech Republic (CZE) | 0 | 0 | 1 | 1 |
| 23 | Estonia (EST) | 0 | 0 | 1 | 1 |
| 23 | Ireland (IRL) | 0 | 0 | 1 | 1 |
| Totals (25 entries) | | 43 | 43 | 43 | 129 |
