= Arthémon Hatungimana =

Burundian middle-distance runner

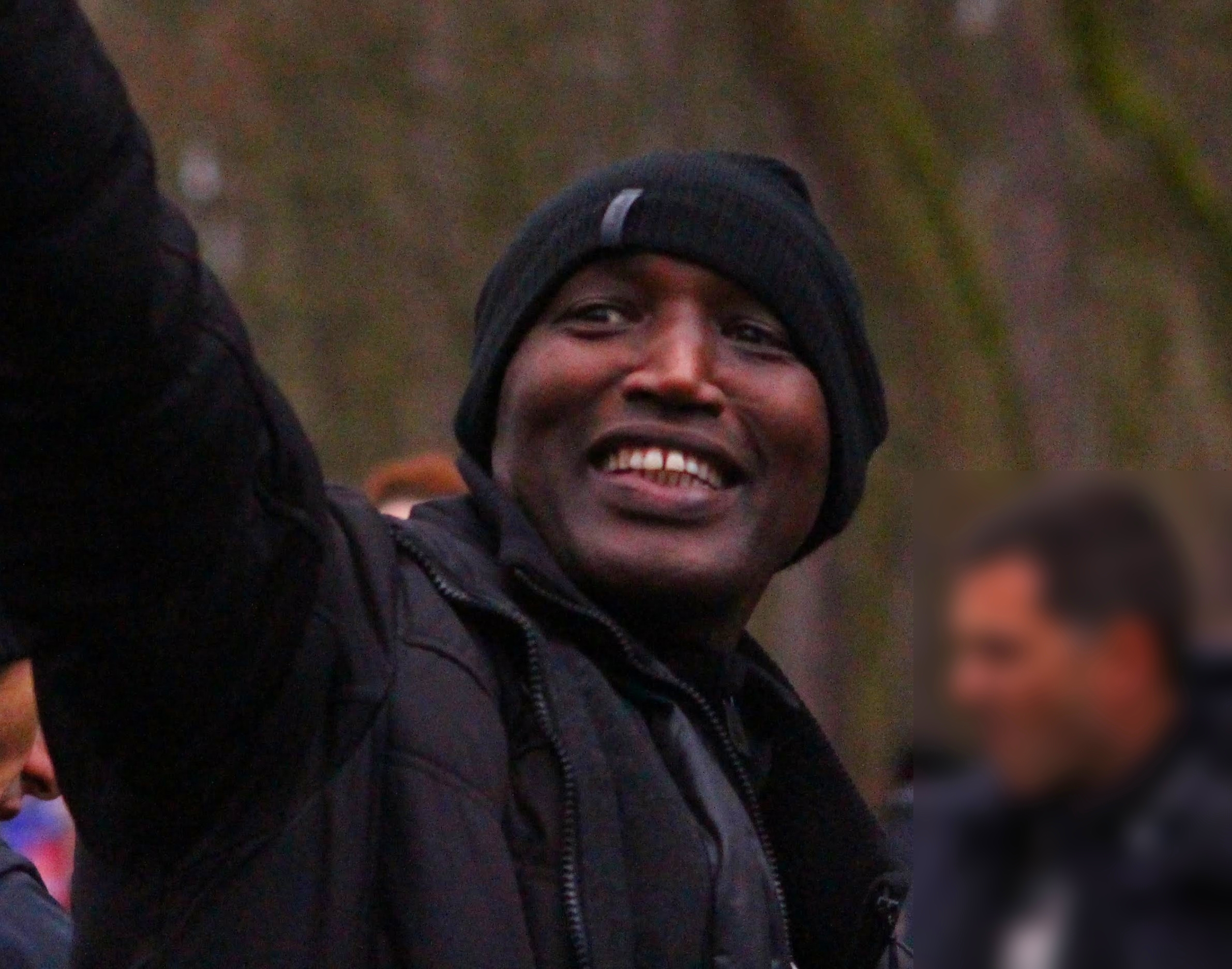
- Burundian Athlete, Arthémon Hatungimana

Personal information
- Born: January 21, 1974 (age 52) Muhweza, Karuzi, Burundi
- Height: 1.80 m (5 ft 11 in)
- Weight: 65 kg (143 lb)

Sport
- Sport: Running
- Event: 800 metres
Medal record
Men's athletics
Representing Burundi
World Championships
Silver medal – second place	1995 Gothenburg	800 m
All-Africa Games
Gold medal – first place	1995 Harare	800 m
African Championships
Bronze medal – third place	1993 Durban	800 m

Arthémon Hatungimana (born January 21, 1974) is a former middle-distance runner from Burundi. In 1995, he won a silver medal in 800 metres at the World Championships in Athletics.

== Competition record ==
Year	Competition	Venue	Position	Event	Notes
Representing Burundi
1992	World Junior Championships	Seoul, South Korea	9th (sf)	400 m	46.78
1993	African Championships	Durban, South Africa	3rd	800 m	1:46.42
1994	Jeux de la Francophonie	Bondoufle, France	4th (h)	800 m	1:50.56^{1}
1995	World Indoor Championships	Barcelona, Spain	10th (h)	800 m	1:50.17
1995	World Championships	Gothenburg, Sweden	2nd	800 m	1:45.64
1995	All-Africa Games	Harare, Zimbabwe	1st	800 m	1:47.42
1996	Olympic Games	Atlanta, United States	7th (sf)	800 m	1:44.92
1997	World Championships	Athens, Greece	19th (qf)	800 m	1:46.64
1997	Jeux de la Francophonie	Antananarivo, Madagascar	1st	800 m	1:46.83
1998	African Championships	Dakar, Senegal	6th	800 m	1:47.63
1999	World Indoor Championships	Maebashi, Japan	8th (sf)	800 m	1:48.17
1999	World Championships	Seville, Spain	25th (h)	800 m	1:47.08
2000	Olympic Games	Sydney, Australia	36th (h)	800 m	1:48.14
2001	World Championships	Edmonton, Canada	5th (sf)	800 m	1:45.21
2002	African Championships	Radès, Tunisia	7th	800 m	1:51.27
2003	World Championships	Paris, France	26th (h)	800 m	1:46.35
2003	All-Africa Games	Abuja, Nigeria	18th (h)	800 m	1:53.16
2004	Olympic Games	Athens, Greece	23rd (h)	800 m	1:46.35

^{1}Did not start in the final

== Personal bests ==
- 400 metres - 46.78 (1992)
- 800 metres - 1:43.38 (2001)
- 1000 metres - 2:15.48 (1995)
