= Vitalie Cercheș =

Moldovan middle-distance runner

Personal information
- Native name: Виталий Черкес
- Nationality: Moldovan
- Born: 9 May 1973 (age 53) Chișinău, Moldova

Sport
- Sport: Athletics
- Event: 800 metres
- Club: Dynamo
- Coached by: Yudin Viktor Vladislavovich

Achievements and titles
- Olympic finals: 2000 Sydney
- Personal best: 800 m: 1:47.18 (2000) NR

Vitalie Cercheș (Russian: Виталий Черкес; born 9 May 1973) is a former Moldovan middle-distance runner, born in Chișinău. He competed for his country in the 800 metres at the 2000 Summer Olympics in Sydney, Australia.

Cerches attended the Specialized Children and Youth Sports School of Olympic Reserve No. 2 (SDYUSHOR No. 2, Russian: СДЮШОР № 2) in Tiraspol, Transnistria, Moldova. He was coached by Yudin Viktor Vladislavovich and represented the Dynamo club in competition.

On 19 August 2000, Cerches set the Moldovan national record in the 800 m, running 1:47.18 minutes. As of 2025, his time is still the national record and was recognized by the Moldovan government's National Records Agency. At the 2000 Olympics, Cerches finished seventh in his heat and failed to advance.

Cerches qualified for several European Cup finals over his career, placing 6th in the Second League 800 m cup in 1993 and 1994. In 1995, he improved his placing to 4th in the 800 m while the following year he finished 7th in both the 400 m and 800 m. After finishing 5th in the 1997 European Cup Second League 400 m, he won his first continental medal by placing 3rd in the 800 m the following day. Cerches improved to a silver medal in the 2001 European Cup Second League 800 m competition, a feat which he repeated at the 2002 European Cup. He continued to race internationally until 2004.

After his athletic career, Cerches became a coach, winning an award from Moldova's Council for Physical Culture and Sports of the Ministry of Education in 2012. He administered the 2012 Prydnestrian Athletics Championship and was responsible for developing athletics in Moldova.
