= Vančo Stojanov =

Macedonian former middle-distance runner (born 1977)

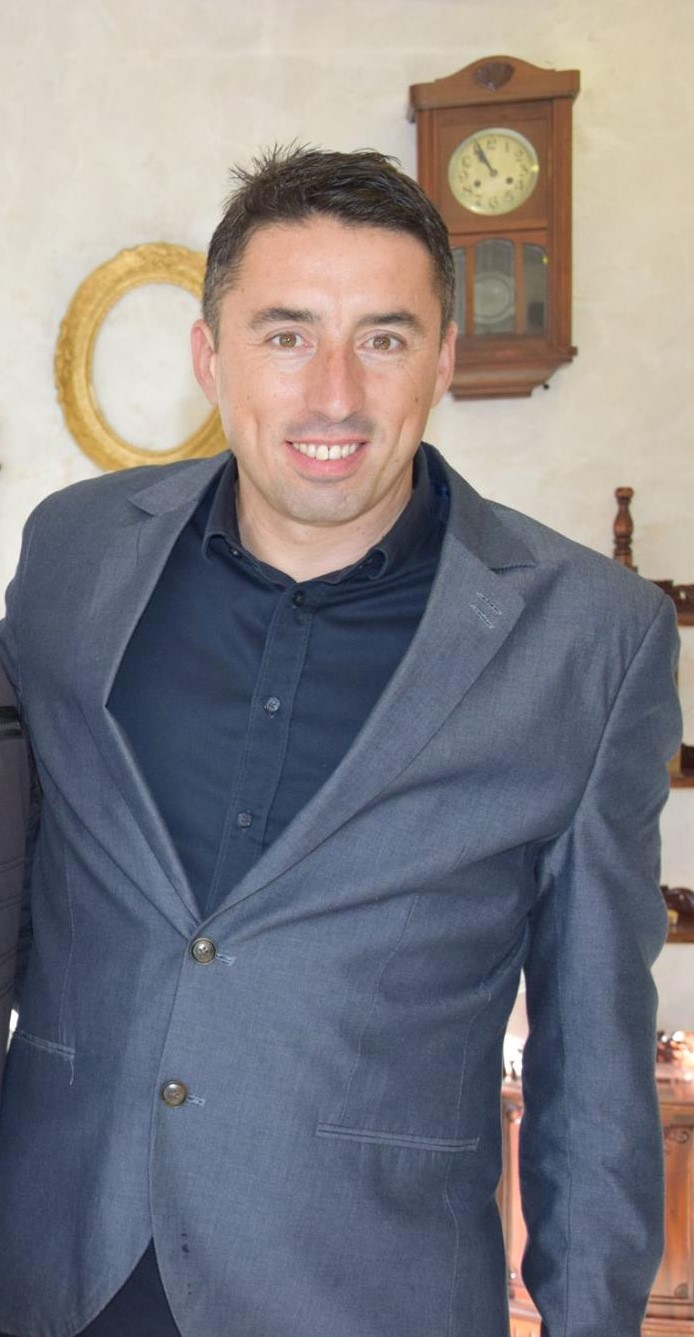
- Vančo Stojanov

Personal information
- Nickname: Vane
- Born: 11 September 1977 (age 48) Strumica, Yugoslavia
- Height: 1.81 m (5 ft 11 in)
- Weight: 75 kg (165 lb)

Sport
- Sport: Athletics
- Event: 800 metres

Vančo "Vane" Stojanov (Macedonian: Ванчо "Ване" Стојанов; born 11 September 1977 in Strumica) is a Macedonian former middle-distance runner who specialised in the 800 metres. He represented his country at the 2000 and 2004 Summer Olympics as well as two World Championships.

== International competitions ==
Year	Competition	Venue	Position	Event	Notes
Representing North Macedonia
1994	World Junior Championships	Lisbon, Portugal	31st (h)	800 m	1:53.38
1995	European Junior Championships	Nyíregyháza, Hungary	15th (h)	800 m	1:51.80
1996	European Indoor Championships	Stockholm, Sweden	15th (h)	800 m	1:56.06
1996	World Junior Championships	Sydney, Australia	28th (h)	800 m	1:53.20
1997	World Championships	Athens, Greece	42nd (h)	800 m	1:52.65
1998	European Championships	Budapest, Hungary	26th (h)	800 m	1:49.00
1999	European U23 Championships	Gothenburg, Sweden	16th (h)	800 m	1:49.66
2000	Olympic Games	Sydney, Australia	27th (h)	800 m	1:47.71
2001	World Championships	Edmonton, Canada	31st (h)	800 m	1:49.54
2002	European Championships	Munich, Germany	23rd (h)	800 m	1:48.31
2004	Olympic Games	Athens, Greece	58th (h)	800 m	1:49.02

== Personal bests ==
Outdoor

- 400 metres – 49.49 (Sofia 2003)
- 800 metres – 1:47.14 (Sofia 2002)
- 1000 metres – 2:32.08 (Skopje 1998)
- 1500 metres – 3:45.97 (Sofia 2001)

Indoor

- 400 metres – 48.90 (Sofia 2003)
- 800 metres – 1:49.36 (Sofia 2003)
- 1500 metres – 3:51.13 (Piraeus 1997)
