= Naseer Ismail =

Maldivian runner

Personal information
- Full name: Naseer Ismail
- Nationality: Maldives
- Born: 10 July 1975 (age 51) Male', Maldives
- Occupations: Former runner and presently a coach
- Height: 1.64 m (5 ft 5 in)
- Weight: 87 kg (192 lb)

Sport
- Sport: Athletics
- Events: 800 m, 1500 m
- Club: Naseer Sports Club

Naseer Ismail (born 10 July 1975) is a former athlete from the Maldives who competed in the middle- and long-distance running events. He represented his country at two consecutive Summer Olympics, starting in 1996, as well as three World Championships.

== Competition record ==
| Year | Competition | Venue | Position | Event | Notes |
Representing Maldives
| 1993 | World Championships | Stuttgart, Germany | 40th (h) | 800 m | 2:02.70 |
| 1993 | World Championships | Stuttgart, Germany | 44th (h) | 1500 m | 4:12.11 |
| 1994 | Commonwealth Games | Victoria, Canada | 27th (h) | 1500 m | 4:10.66 |
| 1994 | Commonwealth Games | Victoria, Canada | 21st (h) | 5000 m | 15:53.97 |
| 1995 | Universiade | Fukuoka, Japan | 47th (h) | 400 m | 51.15 |
| 1995 | Universiade | Fukuoka, Japan | 39th (h) | 800 m | 1:58.32 |
| 1995 | Universiade | Fukuoka, Japan | 37th (h) | 1500 m | 4:07.83 |
| 1996 | Olympic Games | Atlanta, United States | 54th (h) | 800 m | 1:58.70 |
| 1996 | Olympic Games | Atlanta, United States | 32nd (h) | 4 × 400 m relay | 3:24.88 |
| 1998 | Commonwealth Games | Kuala Lumpur, Malaysia | 40th (h) | 400 m | 50.54 |
| 1998 | Commonwealth Games | Kuala Lumpur, Malaysia | 15th (h) | 4 × 100 m relay | 43.67 |
| 1998 | Asian Games | Bangkok, Thailand | 18th (h) | 800 m | 1:55.31 |
| 1999 | World Indoor Championships | Maebashi, Japan | 26th (h) | 800 m | 1:58.17 |
| 1999 | World Championships | Seville, Spain | 53rd (h) | 800 m | 1:56.67 |
| 2000 | Asian Championships | Jakarta, Indonesia | 17th (h) | 800 m | 1:56.09 |
| 2000 | Olympic Games | Sydney, Australia | 58th (h) | 800 m | 1:56.67 |
| 2001 | World Championships | Edmonton, Canada | 36th (h) | 800 m | 2:00.19 |
| 2003 | World Half Marathon Championships | Vilamoura, Portugal | 85th | Half marathon | 1:21:55 |

local competition records.

| National Champion | 400m, 800m, 1500m |
| National relay festival Medley relay | 1st Place |
| National relay festival - 1st Place | 4x100m, 4x400m |
| National Champion | 200m, 400m, 800m |
| Tourism day fun day | 1st Place |
| National Champion | 200m, 400m, 800m |
| Male' Marathon 10k | 1st Place |
| Tourism day medley relay | 1st Place |
| Athlete of the school award | |
| National relay festival champion | |
| National Champion | 800m, 1500m, 5000m |
| Association champion | 400m, 800m, 1500m |
| Interschool tournament best athlete award | |
| Katushihiro cup half marathon champion | |
| Best Athlete of the school award | |
| National Champion | 800m, 1500m |
| Male' Marathon 10k | 1st Place |
| National Champion | 1500m, 5000m |
| Male' marathon | 1st Place |
| Male' marathon 10k | 1st Place |
| National Champion | 800m, 1500m |
| Best Athlete of the school award | |
| Male' marathon 10k | 1st Place |
| Katushihiro cup marathon 10K | 1st Place |
| Tourism day medley relay | 1st Place |
| 1 Mile run | 1st Place |
| Tourism day medley relay | 1st Place |
| Best Athlete of the school award | |
| Male' Marathon 10k | 1st Place |
| Interschool tournament best athlete award | |
| Tourism day medley relay | 1st Place |
| National Champion | 1500m, 5000m |

== Personal bests ==
Outdoor

- 800 metres – 1:53.08 (Kathmandu 1999) NR
- 1500 metres – 3:57.54 (1993)
- Half marathon – 1:21:55 (Vilamoura 2003) NR

Indoor

- 800 metres – 1:58.17 (Maebashi 1999) NR
