= Nathan Kahan =

Belgian middle-distance runner

Personal information
- Born: 12 February 1971 (age 55) Antwerp, Belgium
- Height: 1.87 m (6 ft 2 in)
- Weight: 68 kg (150 lb)

Sport
- Sport: Athletics
- Event: 800 metres
- Club: ABES, Edegem
- Coached by: Jozef Kahan

Nathan Kahan (born 12 February 1971 in Antwerp) is a Belgian retired middle-distance runner who specialised in the 800 metres. He represented his country at the 2000 Summer Olympics, as well as two World Championships. His best result came early in his career when he narrowly missed the final at the 1993 World Championships in Stuttgart.

His personal bests in the event are 1:44.96 outdoors (Nuremberg 1997) and 1:47.93 indoors (Karlsruhe 1998).

Kahan now works as a sport psychologist.

== International competitions ==
Year	Competition	Venue	Position	Event	Notes
Representing Belgium
1993	World Championships	Stuttgart, Germany	10th (sf)	800 m	1:45.75
1997	World Championships	Athens, Greece	28th (qf)	800 m	1:48.66
1998	European Indoor Championships	Valencia, Spain	15th (h)	800 m	1:50.70
1998	European Championships	Budapest, Hungary	12th (sf)	800 m	1:48.39
2000	Olympic Games	Sydney, Australia	26th (h)	800 m	1:47.69
