= Nils Schumann =

German middle-distance runner

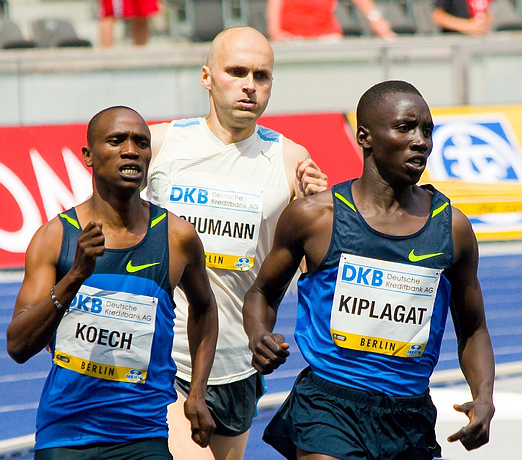
- Nils Schumann (center) with Justus Koech and Silas Kiplagat in 2008

Personal information
- Full name: Nils Schumann
- Born: 20 May 1978 (age 48) Bad Frankenhausen, East Germany
- Height: 1.92 m (6 ft 4 in)

Sport
- Country: Germany
- Sport: Athletics
- Event: 800 metres

Achievements and titles
- Personal bests: 800 metres: 1:44.16 (Brussels; August 2002)
Medal record
Men's athletics
Representing Germany
Olympic Games
Gold medal – first place	2000 Sydney	800 m
IAAF World Cup
Gold medal – first place	1998 Johannesburg	800 m
European Championships
Gold medal – first place	1998 Budapest	800 m
Bronze medal – third place	2002 Munich	800 m
European Indoor Championships
Gold medal – first place	1998 Valencia	800 m
Silver medal – second place	2000 Ghent	800 m

Nils Schumann (German pronunciation: [niːls ˈʃuːman]; born 20 May 1978) is a former German athlete, winner of the 800 m at the 2000 Summer Olympics, who retired in 2009. For most of the five years before his retirement he had featured sparingly at an international level due to injuries.

Schumann, born in Bad Frankenhausen, began his career as a footballer in 1984 before switching to athletics. He won a gold medal over 800 m at the 1998 European Athletics Indoor Championships in Valencia. At the European Championships in Budapest in the same year, he won the title in a close finish. A few weeks later he also won the 800 m race at the World Cup in Johannesburg.

He also made the final of the 1999 World Athletics Championships, but placed 8th and last. He had a quiet 2000 season, until the Olympics started in Sydney. Schumann cruised through the preliminaries, easily qualifying for the final. In the final, Schumann set in his final sprint at the last straight, taking the lead with just 50 m to go. Favourite Wilson Kipketer of Denmark gained in the closing meters, but was unable to prevent a surprise victory by the German runner. In the following year, Schumann finished in fifth place at the 2001 World Championships in Athletics in Edmonton.

Schumann, who also won a bronze medal at the 2002 European Championships, was unable to defend his Olympic title at the 2004 Summer Olympics in Athens, suffering from injury throughout the 2004 season.

== Competition record ==
Year	Competition	Venue	Position	Event	Notes
Representing Germany
1996	World Junior Championships	Sydney, Australia	5th	800 m	1:49.44
1997	European Junior Championships	Ljubljana, Slovenia	1st	800 m	1:51.00
1998	European Indoor Championships	Valencia, Spain	1st	800 m	1:47.02
1998	European Championships	Budapest, Hungary	1st	800 m	1:44.89
1998	World Cup	Johannesburg, South Africa	1st	800 m	1:48.66
1999	European U23 Championships	Gothenburg, Sweden	1st	800 m	1:45.21
1999	European U23 Championships	Gothenburg, Sweden	1st	4 × 400 m relay	3:02.96
1999	World Championships	Seville, Spain	8th	800 m	1:46.79
2000	European Indoor Championships	Ghent, Belgium	3rd	800 m	1:48.41
2000	Olympic Games	Sydney, Australia	1st	800 m	1:45.08
2001	World Championships	Edmonton, Canada	5th	800 m	1:45.00
2002	European Championships	Munich, Germany	3rd	800 m	1:47.60
2002	World Cup	Madrid, Spain	5th	800 m	1:45.34

== Beyond retirement ==
On 3 March 2008 Schumann married the 400 meter runner Korinna Fink. That was the year in which he set up his own business: he also advertises his services as a personal trainer, based in Erfurt.

Awards
Preceded by (Germany) Martin Schmitt	German Sportsman of the Year; 2000	Succeeded by (Germany) Erik Zabel
