= Paweł Czapiewski =

Polish middle-distance runner

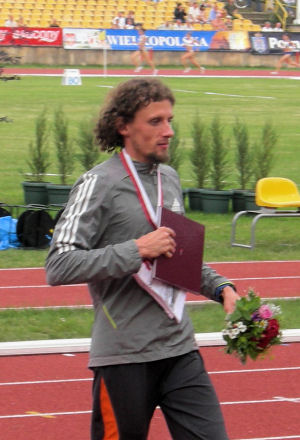
- Czapiewski in 2007

Medal record

Men's athletics

Representing Poland

World Championships
Bronze medal – third place	2001 Edmonton	800 m

European Indoor Championships
Gold medal – first place	2002 Vienna	800 m

Paweł Czapiewski (born 30 March 1978) is a former Polish middle-distance runner. He was born in Stargard.

He came third in the 2001 World Championships in Edmonton in a personal best time of 1:44.63 (1 minute, 44 seconds, and 63 hundredths of a second). Later that month, he established a new personal best of 1:43.22. He later won the 2002 European Indoor Athletics Championships.

He officially retired on 21 July 2012 at the Janusz Kusociński Memorial, having earlier failed to qualify for the 2012 Olympic Games.

== Personal bests ==
Outdoor

- 600 m – 1:16.83 (Kraków 2008)
- 800 m – 1:43.22 (Zürich 2001 NR)
- 1000 m – 2:17.22 (Kraków 2002)
- 1500 m – 3:40.14 (Biala Podlaska 2005)

Indoor

- 800 m – 1:44.78 (Wien 2002 NR)
- 1000 m – 2:19.00 (Erfurt 2001 NR)
- 1500 m – 3:38.96 (Stuttgart 2002)

== Competition record ==
Year	Competition	Venue	Position	Event	Notes
Representing Poland
1996	World Junior Championships	Sydney, Australia	22nd (h)	800 m	1:53.02
1998	European Championships	Budapest, Hungary	27th (h)	800 m	1:49.24
1999	European U23 Championships	Gothenburg, Sweden	3rd	800 m	1:46.98
2001	World Indoor Championships	Lisbon, Portugal	6th	800 m	1:50.51
2001	World Championships	Edmonton, Canada	3rd	800 m	1:44.63
2001	Goodwill Games	Brisbane, Australia	4th	800 m	1:47.21
2002	European Indoor Championships	Vienna, Austria	1st	800 m	1:44.78
2002	European Championships	Munich, Germany	4th	800 m	1:47.92
2005	World Championships	Helsinki, Finland	16th (sf)	800 m	1:46.33
2008	Olympic Games	Beijing, China	35th (h)	800 m	1:47.66
2009	European Indoor Championships	Turin, Italy	10th (h)	800 m	1:51.39

== See also ==
- Polish records in athletics
