= Mohamed Habib Bel Hadj =

Tunisian middle-distance runner

Personal information
- Nationality: Tunisian
- Born: 27 November 1972 (age 53)

Sport
- Sport: Middle-distance running
- Event: 800 metres

Mohamed Habib Bel Hadj (born 27 November 1972) is a Tunisian middle-distance runner. He competed in the men's 800 metres at the 2000 Summer Olympics.

At the 2000 Sydney Olympics, Bel Hadj placed 7th in his heat with a 1:49.14 clocking, failing to advance to the finals. On 14 September later that year, Bel Hadj ran 1:17.69 for 600 metres at a meet in Sydney. His time ranked 23rd in the world that year.

At the 2001 Mediterranean Games, Bel Hadj placed 12th overall in the qualifying round and did not make the top 8 to advance to the finals.

Bel Hadj continued his career as a masters athlete in trail running, recording a top finish at the 2014 Buis-les-Baronnies trail race.

Bel Hadj ran representing the Tunisian National Guard team in club competition.
