= Viktors Lācis =

Latvian middle-distance runner

Personal information
- Born: 28 November 1977 (age 48) Rēzekne district, Latvian SSR, Soviet Union
- Education: Wichita State University

Sport
- Sport: Athletics
- Event(s): 800 m, 400 m hurdles
- College team: Wichita State Shockers
- Coached by: Gints Bitītis

Viktors Lācis (born 28 November 1977) is a Latvian retired middle-distance runner who specialised in the 800 metres. He represented his country at the 2000 Summer Olympics, as well as two World Championships. He later also competed in the 400 metres hurdles.

== International competitions ==
Year	Competition	Venue	Position	Event	Notes
Representing Latvia
1995	European Junior Championships	Nyíregyháza, Hungary	34th (h)	800 m	1:54.82
1996	World Junior Championships	Sydney, Australia	6th	800 m	1:50.11
1997	European U23 Championships	Turku, Finland	6th	800 m	1:48.49
1997	World Championships	Athens, Greece	35th (h)	800 m	1:48.65
1998	European Championships	Budapest, Hungary	16th (h)	800 m	1:47.58
1999	European U23 Championships	Gothenburg, Sweden	6th	800 m	1:48.33
2000	Olympic Games	Sydney, Australia	18th (sf)	800 m	1:47.24
2001	World Championships	Edmonton, Canada	–	400 m hurdles	DNF
2002	European Championships	Munich, Germany	29th (h)	400 m	47.40
2002	European Championships	Munich, Germany	–	4 × 400 m relay	DQ

== Personal bests ==
Outdoor

- 200 metres – 21.75 (+1.5 m/s, Wichita 2002)
- 400 metres – 46.56 (Terre Haute 2001)
- 800 metres – 1:46.07 (Riga 1997)
- 1500 metres – 3:58.38 (Malmö 1998)
- 400 metres hurdles – 49.60 (Eugene 2002) NR

Indoor

- 400 metres – 47.94 (Lincoln 2002)
- 800 metres – 1:49.50 (Cedar Falls 1999)
