= André Bucher =

Swiss middle-distance runner

Personal information
- Born: 19 October 1976 (age 50) Neudorf, Lucerne, Switzerland

Sport
- Sport: Track and field
Medal record
Representing Switzerland
World Championships
Gold medal – first place	2001 Edmonton	800 m
World Indoor Championships
Bronze medal – third place	2001 Lisbon	800 m
European Championships
Silver medal – second place	1998 Budapest	800 m
Silver medal – second place	2002 Munich	800 m
European Indoor Championships
Silver medal – second place	2002 Vienna	800 m

André Bucher (born 19 October 1976) is a retired Swiss 800 metres runner who ran for Adidas. He is best known for winning the gold medal at the 2001 World Championships in Edmonton in his event. Bucher also won the indoor bronze that same year. He was born in Neudorf.

Bucher won two European Championship silver medals in 1998, 2002 and also silver at the 2002 Indoor. Other achievements include finishing third at the 2003 IAAF World Athletics Final.

At the 2000 Summer Olympics in Sydney a medal was possibly chiselled out of him when he was barged into by his competitor Andrea Longo. While Bucher finished the race in fifth place, Longo was later disqualified.

On 17 August 2001, Bucher posted a personal best of 1:42.55 minutes in the 800 meters. That time currently ranks him as the 17th fastest athlete in history. On that race, he beat the young Yuriy Borzakovskiy by a decent margin. The week after, Borzakovskiy would post the time that currently makes him 12th fastest in history.

Bucher retired in May 2007 due to a long-term heel injury.

== Achievements ==
Year	Competition	Venue	Position	Event	Notes
Representing Switzerland
1994	World Junior Championships	Lisbon, Portugal	2nd	1500 m	3:40.46
1995	European Junior Championships	Nyíregyháza, Hungary	2nd	800 m	1:46.73
1996	Olympic Games	Atlanta, United States	11th (sf)	800 m	1:46.41
1997	European U23 Championships	Turku, Finland	2nd	800 m	1:47.13
1997	World Championships	Athens, Greece	14th (sf)	800 m	1:46.88
1998	European Championships	Budapest, Hungary	2nd	800 m	1:45.04 (NR)
1999	World Indoor Championships	Maebashi, Japan	23rd (h)	800 m	1:52.43
1999	Universiade	Palma de Mallorca, Spain	2nd	800 m	1:46.49
1999	World Championships	Seville, Spain	19th (sf)	800 m	1:48.07
2000	Olympic Games	Sydney, Australia	5th	800 m	1:45.40
2000	Olympic Games	Sydney, Australia	16th (h)	4 × 400 m relay	3:06.01
2001	World Indoor Championships	Lisbon, Portugal	3rd	800 m	1:46.46
2001	World Championships	Edmonton, Canada	1st	800 m	1:43.70
2002	European Indoor Championships	Vienna, Austria	2nd	800 m	1:44.93 (iNR)
2002	European Championships	Munich, Germany	2nd	800 m	1:47.43
2003	World Championships	Paris, France	11th (sf)	800 m	1:46.67
2004	Olympic Games	Athens, Greece	38th (h)	800 m	1:47.34
2005	World Championships	Helsinki, Finland	23rd (h)	800 m	1:47.97

Awards
Preceded by (Switzerland) Marcel Schelbert	Swiss Sportsman of the Year; 2000–2001	Succeeded by (Switzerland) Simon Ammann
Preceded by (Czech Republic) Jan Železný	Men's European Athlete of the Year; 2001	Succeeded by (United Kingdom) Dwain Chambers
