= Roberto Parra =

Spanish middle-distance runner

Roberto Parra Mateo (born 6 April 1976 in Socuéllamos, Ciudad Real) is a Spanish middle distance runner. He specialized in the 800 and 1500 metres events.

He was municipal councillor in his native town from 2011 to 2014.

== Competition record ==
Year	Competition	Venue	Position	Event	Notes
Representing Spain
1994	World Junior Championships	Lisbon, Portugal	10th (h)	800m	1:50.24
1995	European Junior Championships	Nyíregyháza, Hungary	1st	800 m	1:45.90
1996	European Indoor Championships	Stockholm, Sweden	1st	800 m	1:47.74
1998	European Indoor Championships	Valencia, Spain	–	800 m	DNF
1998	Ibero-American Championships	Lisbon, Portugal	2nd	800 m	1:50.19
1998	European Championships	Budapest, Hungary	15th (sf)	800 m	1:49.26
1999	World Championships	Seville, Spain	9th (sf)	800 m	1:46.07
2000	European Indoor Championships	Ghent, Belgium	5th	800 m	1:49.80
2000	Olympic Games	Sydney, Australia	38th (h)	800 m	1:48.19
2001	World Indoor Championships	Lisbon, Portugal	12th (sf)	800 m	1:49.67
2003	World Indoor Championships	Birmingham, United Kingdom	9th	1500 m	3:47.44
2003	World Championships	Paris, France	10th	1500 m	3:35.02

=== Personal bests ===
- 800 metres - 1:44.97 min (1996)
- 1500 metres - 3:35.02 min (2003)
