= Puntsag-Ochiryn Pürevsüren =

Mongolian middle-distance runner (born 1975)

Personal information
- Nationality: Mongolian
- Born: 30 January 1975 (age 51)

Sport
- Sport: Middle-distance running
- Event: 800 metres

Puntsag-Ochiryn Pürevsüren (born 30 January 1975) is a Mongolian middle-distance runner. He competed in the men's 800 metres at the 2000 Summer Olympics, placing 56th.

Pürevsüren first qualified for the 1994 World U20 Championships in Athletics, where he finished 6th in his 800 m heat. It was the highest placing ever for a Mongolian men's athlete at the World U20 Championships in the nation's seven appearances.

He qualified for his first senior global championships at the 1997 IAAF World Indoor Championships, where he again finished 6th in his 800 m heat. His time of 1:55.76 was a Mongolian national record. He also competed in the 1998 Asian Games 400 m, but he was disqualified in his heat.

At the 2000 Summer Olympics, Pürevsüren finished 8th in his 800 m heat and failed to advance.

Pürevsüren was one of the first Olympic athletes to access the Internet, utilizing new Surf Shack facilities set up in Sydney during the 2000 Games.
