= Japheth Kimutai =

Kenyan middle-distance runner (born 1978)

Medal record

Men's athletics

Representing Kenya

African Championships
Gold medal – first place	1998 Dakar	800 m

Japheth Kimutai (born 20 December 1978 in Lelmokwo, Nandi District) is a Kenyan middle-distance runner who specialized in 800 metres.

In 1998 he won the gold medal at the Kuala Lumpur Commonwealth Games in a time of 1:43.82. In the same year he won the African Championships 800 metres in Dakar, Senegal. He finished fourth at the 1998 IAAF World Cup.

In 1999 he won gold at the All-Africa Games.

In 2000 in Sydney for the Olympic Games Japheth failed to reach the final despite running the quickest time by a Kenyan in the games.

He had started his career brightly when in 1994 he won the silver medal at the World Junior Championships and then in 1997 when still a Junior set the World junior record in the 800 metres in a time of 1:43.64 in Zürich on 13 August 1997. The world junior record was beaten by Abubaker Kaki of Sudan in 2008.

He is currently the Director Complete Sports Athletics Training Centre, Kaptagat.

== Achievements ==
Year	Competition	Venue	Position	Event	Notes
Representing Kenya
1994	World Junior Championships	Lisbon, Portugal	2nd	800m	1:48.22
1994	World Junior Championships	Lisbon, Portugal	—	4 × 400 m relay	DQ
1995	African Junior Championships	Bouaké, Ivory Coast	1st	800 m	1:47.67
1995	African Junior Championships	Bouaké, Ivory Coast	1st	1500 m	3:49.78
1996	World Junior Championships	Sydney, Australia	4th	800m	1:48.97
1996	World Junior Championships	Sydney, Australia	8th	4 × 400 m relay	3:09.04
1998	African Championships	Dakar, Senegal	1st	800 m	1:45.82
1998	Commonwealth Games	Kuala Lumpur, Malaysia	1st	800 m	1:43.82
1999	World Championships	Seville, Spain	5th	800 m	1:45.18
1999	All-Africa Games	Johannesburg, South Africa	1st	800 m	1:44.91
2000	Olympic Games	Sydney, Australia	12th (sf)	800 m	1:45.64
2002	Commonwealth Games	Manchester, United Kingdom	5th	800 m	1:47.46
2003	World Championships	Paris, France	19th (sf)	800 m	1:47.53

Records
Preceded by (United States) Jim Ryun	Men's World Junior Record Holder, 800 metres 13 August 1997 – 6 June 2008	Succeeded by (Sudan) Abubaker Kaki Khamis
