= Paul Byrne (runner) =

Australian middle-distance runner

Personal information
- Nationality: Australian
- Born: 29 January 1976 (age 50) Geelong, Australia

Sport
- Sport: Track and field
- Event: 800 metres

Achievements and titles
- Personal bests: 800 m: 1:45.91 (1995); 1000 m: 2:20.5 (1995)
Medal record
Men's Athletics
Representing (Australia)
World Junior Championships in Athletics
Gold medal – first place	1994 Lisbon	Men's 800 m

Paul Byrne (born 29 January 1976) is an Australian male former track and field athletes. He was born in Geelong, Victoria and grew up in Connewarre and Grovedale, Victoria. He was an outstanding junior athlete who won a gold medal at the 1994 World Junior Championships in Athletics, held in Lisbon. Injuries hampered much of his career. His best result in his senior career was a semi-final appearance at the 1996 Atlanta Olympics.

== Personal bests ==
- 800 metres – 1:45.91 – Lindau – 28 July 1995
- 1000 metres – 2:20.5 – Melbourne – 6 January 1995
