= Abdou Ibrahim Youssef =

Qatari middle-distance runner

Personal information
- Nationality: Qatari
- Born: 27 December 1981 (age 44)

Sport
- Sport: Middle-distance running
- Event: 800 metres

Abdou Ibrahim Youssef (Arabic: عبده إبراهيم يوسف, born 27 December 1981) is a Qatari middle-distance runner. He competed in the men's 800 metres at the 2000 Summer Olympics.
