= Abdulrahman Hassan Abdullah =

Qatari middle-distance runner

Personal information
- Nationality: Qatari
- Born: 14 September 1977 (age 49)

Sport
- Sport: Middle-distance running
- Event: 800 metres
Medal record
Men's athletics
Representing Qatar
Asian Games
Bronze medal – third place	1998 Bangkok	800 m
Asian Championships
Silver medal – second place	1998 Fukuoka	800 m

Abdulrahman Hassan Abdullah (Arabic: عبد الرحمن حسن عبد الله, born 14 September 1977) is a Qatari middle-distance runner. He competed in the men's 800 metres at the 1996 Summer Olympics.
