= Pavel Pelepyagin =

Belarusian middle-distance runner

Personal information
- Nationality: Belarusian
- Born: 29 June 1978 (age 48)

Sport
- Sport: Middle-distance running
- Event: 800 metres

Pavel Pelepyagin (born 29 June 1978) is a Belarusian middle-distance runner. He competed in the men's 800 metres at the 2000 Summer Olympics.
