= Milton Browne =

Barbadian middle-distance runner

Personal information
- Nationality: Barbadian
- Born: 1 June 1976 (age 50)

Sport
- Sport: Middle-distance running
- Event: 800 metres

Milton O. Browne (born 1 June 1976) is a Barbadian middle-distance runner. He competed in the men's 800 metres at the 2000 Summer Olympics.
