= Mahjoub Haïda =

Moroccan middle-distance runner

Medal record

Men's athletics

Representing Morocco

World Indoor Championships
Silver medal – second place	1997 Paris	800 m

African Championships
Bronze medal – third place	1992 Belle Vue Harel	800 m

Mahjoub Haïda (born 1 July 1970) is a Moroccan retired middle distance runner who specialized in the 800 metres.

== Biography ==
He finished fifth at the 1995 World Indoor Championships, third at the 1995 IAAF Grand Prix Final and won the silver medal at the 1997 World Indoor Championships. He also competed at the 1992 Olympic Games, the 1993 World Championships, the 1995 World Championships, the 1999 World Championships and the 2000 Olympic Games without reaching the final. On the regional level he won the bronze medal at the 1992 African Championships, the gold medal at the 1993 Mediterranean Games, and the gold medal at the 1994 Jeux de la Francophonie.

His personal best times were 1:43.50 minutes in the 800 metres, achieved in July 1998 in Rome; and 2:14.69 minutes in the 1000 metres, achieved in July 1995 in Nice. He was the world's best performer in the 1000 metres in both 1995 and 1998, and his 1000 metres time is also the current Moroccan record.

== Achievements ==
Year	Competition	Venue	Position	Event	Notes
Representing Morocco
1994	Jeux de la Francophonie	Paris, France	1st	800 m	1:50.48
