= Werner Botha =

South African sprinter

Personal information
- Nationality: South African
- Born: 31 January 1978 (age 48)

Sport
- Sport: Sprinting
- Event: 4 × 400 metres relay
Medal record
Men's athletics
Representing South Africa
African Championships
Bronze medal – third place	2004 Brazzaville	4×400 m

Werner Botha (born 31 January 1978) is a South African sprinter. He competed in the men's 4 × 400 metres relay at the 2000 Summer Olympics.
