= Adem Hecini =

Algerian athletics competitor

Medal record

Men's athletics

Representing Algeria

African Championships
Gold medal – first place	2000 Algiers	4×400 m
Silver medal – second place	1996 Yaoundé	800 m

Adem Hecini (Arabic: آدم حسيني; born 13 December 1975) is an Algerian athlete who specializes in the 400 and 800 metres.

In the 800 metres he won the silver medal at the 1996 African Championships, and the gold medal at the 2001 Mediterranean Games. He also competed at three World Championships (1997, 1999 and 2001) as well as the Olympic Games in 1996 and 2000 without reaching the final round. His personal best time is 1:44.59 minutes, achieved in August 1997 in Zürich.

In 2002 he finished fourth at the 2002 African Championships, and was selected to represent Africa in 4 × 400 metres relay at the 2002 IAAF World Cup. The African team, with Adem Hecini, Sofiane Labidi, Fernando Augustin and Eric Milazar, won the bronze medal. He also competed at the 2004 Olympic Games. His personal best time is 45.63 seconds, achieved in September 2003 in Amman.
