= Hezekiél Sepeng =

South African middle-distance runner

Personal information
- Full name: Hezekiél Sello Sepeng
- Nationality: South African
- Born: 30 June 1974 (age 52) Potchefstroom
- Education: Potchefstroom High School for Boys
- Height: 176 cm (5 ft 9 in)
- Weight: 63 kg (139 lb)

Sport
- Country: South Africa
- Sport: Athletics
- Event: 800m
Medal record
Men's athletics
Representing South Africa
Olympic Games
| Silver medal – second place | 1996 Atlanta | 800 m |
World Championships
| Silver medal – second place | 1999 Seville | 800 m |
African Championships
| Silver medal – second place | 2004 Brazzaville | 800 m |
Commonwealth Games
| Silver medal – second place | 1994 Victoria | 800 m |
| Silver medal – second place | 1998 Kuala Lumpur | 800 m |
Universiade
| Gold medal – first place | 1995 Fukuoka | 800m |
| Silver medal – second place | 1997 Catania | 800m |

Hezekiél Sello Sepeng (born 30 June 1974), is a South African former middle-distance runner who won silver in the Olympic 800 metres final in Atlanta 1996 (behind Vebjørn Rodal), the 1998 Commonwealth Games (behind Japheth Kimutai) and the World Championships' final in Seville 1999 (behind Wilson Kipketer). He was banned from competition from May 2005 to May 2007 after a positive doping test for nandrolone.

He was born in Potchefstroom and educated at Potchefstroom Boys High, where he was in the same class as South African commonwealth boxer Sean Santana.

== See also ==
- List of sportspeople sanctioned for doping offences

Olympic Games
| Preceded by Shirene Human | Flagbearer for South Africa; Sydney 2000 | Succeeded by Alexander Heath |
