= Andrea Longo (runner) =

Italian middle-distance runner

Personal information
- Nationality: Italian
- Born: 26 June 1975 (age 51) Piove di Sacco, Italy
- Height: 1.91 m (6 ft 3 in)
- Weight: 83 kg (183 lb)

Sport
- Country: Italy
- Sport: Athletics
- Event: Middle distance running
- Club: G.S. Fiamme Oro

Achievements and titles
- Personal best: 800 m: 1:43.74 (2000)
Medal record
Mediterranean Games
Silver medal – second place	1997 Bari	800 metres
European U23 Championships
Gold medal – first place	1997 Turku	800 metres

Andrea Longo (born 26 June 1975 in Piove di Sacco) is a former Italian middle-distance runner.

== Biography ==
He achieved his personal best just before the Sydney Olympics, running 1'43"74 in Rieti in September 2000, reaching the second place in the all-time ranking in Italy, behind former world record holder Marcello Fiasconaro. He was disqualified from the 800 metres final at the 2000 Summer Olympics after barging Switzerland's André Bucher. He served a two-year ban from 2001 for testing positive for nandrolone.

After his ban, his best performances have been a 5th place at the 2003 World Championships and a 7th place at the 2006 European Athletics Championships, both in the 800m. He was also a semi-finalist at the 2004 Olympics. He was the European record holder for the rarely run 600m (1'14"41). He is the husband of Fabé Dia.

== Achievements ==
Year	Competition	Venue	Position	Event	Notes
Representing Italy
1994	World Junior Championships	Lisbon, Portugal	10th (sf)	800m	1:52.00
1997	European U23 Championships	Turku, Finland	1st	800m	1:46.49
1997	European U23 Championships	Turku, Finland	7th	4 × 400 m relay	3:08.00
1999	World Championships	Seville, Spain	6th	800 metres	1:45.33
2003	World Championships	Paris, France	5th	800 metres	1:45.43

== National titles ==
Andrea Longo has won 7 times the individual national championship.

- 4 wins in the 800 metres (1998, 1999, 2000, 2005)
- 1 win in the 800 metres indoor (1997)
- 2 wins in the 1500 metres indoor (2004, 2005)

== See also ==
- Italian all-time lists - 800 metres
- List of sportspeople sanctioned for doping offences
