= List of male middle-distance runners =

As of May 2005, this is a list of notable male middle distance runners (800 m – 3000 m) since the first Olympic Games in 1896.

This list includes any athlete who has been a medalist in the Olympic Games or World championships (indoor and outdoor). Also included are medalists in the IAAF World Cup and WAF events. Finally, it includes any athlete ranked (by time) in the top three of a middle-distance event for any given year since 1980.

== A ==
- José Manuel Abascal, ESP
- Saïd Aouita, MAR
- Yevgeniy Arzhanov, URS (UKR)
- Jeff Atkinson, USA

== B ==
- Mehdi Baala, FRA
- Philip Baker, GBR
- José Luíz Barbosa, BRA
- Arturo Barrios, MEX
- Josy Barthel, LUX
- Rachid El Basir, MAR
- Dieter Baumann, FRG
- Filbert Bayi, TAN
- Luigi Beccali, ITA
- Kenenisa Bekele, ETH
- Charles Bennett, GBR
- Andrea Benvenuti, ITA
- Olaf Beyer, GDR
- Abdi Bile, SOM
- Jonah Birir, KEN
- Paul Bitok, KEN
- Arthur Blake, USA
- Mike Boit, KEN
- Yuriy Borzakovskiy, RUS
- Johan Botha, RSA
- Brahim Boutayeb, MAR
- Hammou Boutayeb, MAR
- Audun Boysen, NOR
- Hanns Braun, GER
- John Bray, USA
- Emil Breitkreutz, USA
- André Bucher, SUI
- Wilfred Bungei, KEN
- Andreas Busse, GDR
- Erik Byléhn, SWE

== C ==
- Fermín Cacho, ESP
- Mateo Cañellas, ESP
- Abraham Chebii, KEN
- Joseph Chesire, KEN
- William Chirchir, KEN
- Sebastian Coe, GBR
- Eamonn Coghlan, IRL
- Jerry Cornes, GBR
- Tom Courtney, USA
- Steve Cram, GBR
- John Cregan, USA
- Bill Crothers, CAN
- Joaquim Cruz, BRA
- Glenn Cunningham, USA
- Paweł Czapiewski, POL

== D ==
- Nándor Dáni, HUN
- Ira Davenport, USA
- John Davies, NZL
- Tomás de Teresa, ESP
- Ron Delany, IRL
- Pierre Délèze, SUI
- Henri Deloge, FRA
- Rob Denmark, GBR
- Gennaro Di Napoli, ITA
- Andrés Manuel Díaz, ESP
- Rod Dixon, NZL
- Osmar dos Santos, BRA
- Ralph Doubell, AUS
- Simon Doyle, AUS
- Rob Druppers, NED
- Eric Dubus, FRA
- Giuseppe D'Urso, ITA

== E ==
- Earl Eby, USA
- Phil Edwards, CAN
- Hicham El Guerrouj, MAR
- Herb Elliott, AUS
- Peter Elliott, GBR
- Schuyler Enck, USA
- Hermann Engelhard, GER
- Paul Ereng, KEN
- Henry Eriksson, SWE
- Reyes Estévez, ESP
- Mark Everett, USA

== F ==
- Joe Falcon, USA
- Tom Farrell, USA
- Edwin Flack, AUS
- Ray Flynn, IRL
- Hauke Fuhlbrügge, GDR

== G ==
- José David Galván, MEX
- Alberto García, ESP
- Haile Gebrselassie, ETH
- Markos Geneti, ETH
- Dimitrios Golemis, GRE
- Benjamín González, ESP
- José Luis González, ESP
- Johnny Gray, USA
- Agberto Guimarães, BRA

== H ==
- Abdelkader Hachlaf, MAR
- Mahjoub Haïda, MAR
- David Hall, USA
- Norman Hallows, GBR
- Wyndham Halswelle, GBR
- Tommy Hampson, GBR
- Marcel Hansenne, FRA
- Arthémon Hatungimana, BDI
- Lacey Hearn, USA
- Kristian Hellström, SWE
- Jens-Peter Herold, GDR
- Ivan Heshko, UKR
- Shazia Hidayat PAK
- Albert Hill, GBR
- Michael Hillardt, AUS
- Simon Hoogewerf, CAN
- Harald Hudak, FRG

== J ==
- Brahim Jabbour, MAR
- Arnold Jackson, GBR
- Michel Jazy, FRA
- Anacleto Jiménez, ESP
- Derek Johnson, GBR
- Earl Jones, USA
- Alberto Juantorena, CUB

== K ==
- Yusuf Saad Kamel, BRN
- William Kemei, KEN
- Kip Keino, KEN
- Rich Kenah, USA
- George Kerr, JAM
- Omer Khalifa, SUD
- David Kibet, KEN
- John Kibowen, KEN
- Japheth Kimutai, KEN
- Alex Kipchirchir, KEN
- Eliud Kipchoge, KEN
- Wilson Kipketer, DEN
- Paul Kipkoech, KEN
- Stephen Kipkorir, KEN
- Luke Kipkosgei, KEN
- Nixon Kiprotich, KEN
- Wilson Kiprugut, KEN
- Moses Kiptanui, KEN
- Timothy Kiptanui, KEN
- Wilfred Kirochi, KEN
- Nikolay Kirov, URS (BLR)
- Abel Kiviat, USA
- Benson Koech, KEN
- Daniel Komen, KEN
- Billy Konchellah, KEN
- Patrick Konchellah, KEN
- Paul Korir, KEN
- Sammy Koskei, KEN
- David Krummenacker, USA
- Han Kulker, NED
- James Kwalia, KEN

== L ==
- Jules Ladoumègue, FRA
- Bernard Lagat, KEN
- Faouzi Lahbi, MAR
- John Landy, AUS
- Mario Lanzi, ITA
- Harri Larva, FIN
- Cyrille Laventure, FRA
- Serhiy Lebid, UKR
- António Leitão, POR
- Albin Lermusiaux, FRA
- James Lightbody, USA
- Benjamin Limo, KEN
- Jack Lovelock, NZL
- Douglas Lowe, GBR
- Werner Lueg, GER (FRG)
- Emilio Lunghi, ITA

== M ==
- Driss Maazouzi, FRA
- James Maina, KEN
- Sydney Maree, USA
- Paul Martin, SUI
- John Mayock, GBR
- John McGough, GBR(IRL)
- Tom McKean, GBR
- Bob McMillen, USA
- Hailu Mekonnen, ETH
- Ted Meredith, USA
- Assefa Mezgebu, ETH
- Roger Moens, BEL
- Enrique Molina, ESP
- David Moorcroft, GBR
- Noureddine Morceli, ALG
- Nico Motchebon, GER
- Craig Mottram, AUS
- Mohammed Mourhit, BEL
- Mbulaeni Mulaudzi, RSA
- Joseph Mutua, KEN

== N ==
- Patrick Ndururi, KEN
- Jean-Patrick Nduwimana, BDI
- Erik Nedeau, USA
- Noah Ngeny, KEN
- Vénuste Niyongabo, BDI
- Charles Nkazamyampi, BDI
- Paavo Nurmi, FIN
- Tom Nyariki, KEN

== O ==
- Josef Odložil, CZE
- Frank O'Mara, IRL
- Yobes Ondieki, KEN
- Fred Onyancha, KEN
- Marcus O'Sullivan, IRL
- Steve Ovett, GBR

== P ==
- Doug Padilla, USA
- Don Paige, USA
- Francesco Panetta, ITA
- Paul Pilgrim, USA
- Eino Purje, FIN

== R ==
- Rashid Ramzi, BRN
- Gary Reed, CAN
- Antonio Manuel Reina, ESP
- Klaus Richtzenhain, GER (GDR)
- James Robinson, USA
- Vebjørn Rodal, NOR
- Henry Rono, KEN
- Peter Rono, KEN
- Laban Rotich, KEN
- István Rózsavölgyi, HUN
- Bevil Rudd, SAF
- Paul Ruto, KEN
- Jim Ryun, USA

== S ==
- Djabir Saïd-Guerni, ALG
- Wes Santee, USA
- Willy Schärer, SUI
- Nils Schumann, GER
- Steve Scott, USA
- Hezekiél Sepeng, RSA
- Ismaïl Sghyr, MAR/FRA
- David Sharpe, GBR
- Mel Sheppard, USA
- Larry Shields, USA
- Ali Saïdi Sief, ALG
- Mário Silva, POR
- Rui Silva, POR
- Khalid Skah, MAR
- Willem Slijkhuis, NED
- Peter Snell, NZL
- Bram Som, NED
- Boniface Songok, KEN
- Jim Spivey, USA
- H. B. Stallard, GBR
- Martin Steele, GBR
- Rüdiger Stenzel, GER
- Lennart Strand, SWE
- David Strang, GBR
- Jürgen Straub, GDR
- Mohammed Sulaiman, QAT

== T ==
- Norman Taber, USA
- William Tanui, KEN
- Norberto Téllez, CUB
- Clive Terrelonge, JAM
- Colomán Trabado, ESP
- Bodo Tümmler, FRG
- Alfred Tysoe, GBR

== U ==
- Heinz Ulzheimer, GER (FRG)

== V ==
- Howard Valentine, USA
- Ivo Van Damme, BEL
- Pekka Vasala, FIN
- Frank Verner, USA
- Tonino Viali, ITA
- Isaac Viciosa, ESP

== W ==
- Detlef Wagenknecht, GDR
- John Walker, NZL
- Alan Webb, USA
- Paul-Heinz Wellmann, FRG
- Mulugeta Wendimu, ETH
- Thomas Wessinghage, FRG
- Anthony Whiteman, GBR
- Mal Whitfield, USA
- Alex Wilson, CAN
- Harold Wilson, GBR
- Craig Winrow, GBR
- Arthur Wint, JAM
- Rick Wohlhuter, USA
- Million Wolde, ETH
- John Woodruff, USA
- Dave Wottle, USA
- Willi Wülbeck, FRG
- William Wuycke, VEN

== Y ==
- William Yiampoy, KEN

== Z ==
- Branko Zorko, CRO

== MIA ==
Athletes who medalled in a middle-distance event at both the European and Commonwealth Championships but did not meet the criteria to be listed above:

- Roger Bannister, GBR
- Brendan Foster, GBR
- Brian Hewson, GBR
- John Parlett, GBR
- Mike Rawson, GBR
- Sydney Wooderson, GBR

Other athletes who were ranked in the top three of 'Track and Field News' (TFN) end of year rankings for 800 m or 1500 m but have not already been listed above, are listed below. Rankings have been done every year since 1947.

André De Hertoghe BEL – Andy Carter GB – Arnie Sowell USA – Ben Jipcho KEN – Dan Waern SWE – Danie Malan SA – David Mack US – Derek Ibbotson GBR – Dieter Fromm EG – Don Gehrmann USA – Doug Harris NZ – Dyrol Burleson USA – Francesco Arese ITA – Franz-Josef Kemper WG – Gaston Reiff BEL – Gösta Bergkvist SWE – Gunnar Nielsen DEN – Henry Szordykowski POL – Jean-Pierre Dufresne FRA – Jerry Siebert USA – Jim Baily AUS – Jim Beatty USA – Jim Dupree FRA – John Fulton USA – Jozef Plachy CZE – Jürgen May EG – Ken Swenson USA – Lajos Szentgáli HUN – László Tábori HUN – Manfred Matuschewski EG – Marcello Fiasconaro ITA – Marty Liquori USA – Merv Lincoln AUS – Murray Halberg NZ – Niels Hoslt-Sörensen DEN – Olle Åberg SWE – Patrick El Mabrouk FRA – Luciano Susanj YUG – Urban Cleve WG – Sándor Iharos HUN – Siegried Valentin EG – Stanislav Jungwirth CZE – Stefan Lewandowski POL – Wade Bell USA – Wes Santee USA – Wilfred Kirochi KEN

Other Commonwealth Games medalists not already listed above:

Gerald Backhouse AUS – Frank Handley ENG – Alan Simpson ENG – Albie Thomas AUS – Ben Jipcho KEN – Benedict Cayenne TRI – Bill Dale CAN – Bill Parnell CAN – Brian Hewson ENG – Chris McGeorge ENG – Dave Campbell CAN – Dick Quax NZL – Willie Botha SAF – Ian Boyd ENG – Ian Studd NZL – Jack Hutchins CAN – James "Hamish" Stothard SCO – Jim Alford WAL – John Gladwin ENG – John Kipkurgat KEN – John Robson SCO – Kevin Sullivan CAN – Kris McCarthy AUS – Len Eyre ENG – Matthew Yates ENG – Maurice Marshall NZL – Merv Lincoln AUS – Michael East ENG – Noel Clough AUS – Peter Bourke AUS – Peter Lemashon KEN – Peter O'Donoghue NZL/AUS – Reg Thomas WAL – Reuben Chesang KEN – Rich Ferguson CAN – Robert Ouko KEN – Sammy Tirop KEN – Savieri Ngidhi ZIM – Seymour Newman JAM – Terry Sullivan FRN – Tony Blue AUS – Vernon "Pat" Boot NZL – William Smart CAN – William Whyte AUS – Youcef Abdi AUS

Other European Athletics Championships medalists not already listed above:

Bill Nankeville GBR – Erik Jørgensen DEN – Frank Murphy IRL – Hans-Peter Ferner FRG – Harald Norpoth FRG – Jacques Lévèque FRA – John Whetton GBR – Jorma Härkönen FIN – Joseph Mostert BEL – Klaus-Peter Justus GDR – Lucien De Muynck BEL – Lukas Vydra CZE – Markku Taskinen FIN – Miklós Szabó HUN – Paul Schmidt FRG – Piotr Piekarski POL – Roger Normand FRA – Rudolf Harbig GER – Rune Gustafsson SWE – Tom Birger Hansen DEN – Tomá Salinger TCH – Valeriy Bulyshev URS – Witold Baran POL – Marcin Lewandowski POL – Michael Rimmer GBR – Adam Kszczot POL
