= 1993 World Championships in Athletics – Men's 800 metres =

These are the official results of the Men's 800 metres event at the 1993 IAAF World Championships in Stuttgart, Germany. There were a total number of 44 participating athletes, with six qualifying heats, three semi-finals and the final held on Tuesday 1993-08-17.

With three Kenyans qualified for the final, word was out that they might send out time qualifier Paul Ruto as the sacrificial lamb to burn out the field. Freddie Williams was the leader from the gun, but just before the break Ruto rushed to the lead and it appeared the strategy was in effect. The rest of the field cooperated and fell in line behind him. Ruto checked back at 200 metres and again at 300 metres, but nobody was challenging. Ruth had a 5-metre lead at the bell in 51.22. William Tanui moved forward early and was the next back through the turn followed by Curtis Robb. Along the backstretch. Williams began a run at Ruto, around Robb followed by Giuseppe D'Urso, Tanui was falling through the field with Billy Konchellah in last place, it looked like the Kenyan team strategy was going to blow up. Coming off the final turn, Williams looked like he had set Ruto up and was going to sprint by, but instead Williams could make no forward progress, his body delaying D'Urso and Ruto again had a 2-meter lead. D'Urso chased Ruto down the straightaway but couldn't make any progress. Everybody else in the field sliding further away except Konchellah, still last off the turn but the field tightening, Konchellah moved out to lane 3 to avoid traffic and sprinted past the crowd, chasing D'Urso to the line but not quite getting there in time. Ruto the surprise winner holding the lead virtually the entire race.

== Medalists ==
Gold	Paul Ruto; Kenya (KEN)
Silver	Giuseppe D'Urso; Italy (ITA)
Bronze	Billy Konchellah; Kenya (KEN)

== Final ==
RANK	FINAL	TIME
	Paul Ruto (KEN)	1:44.71
	Giuseppe D'Urso (ITA)	1:44.86
	Billy Konchellah (KEN)	1:44.89
4.	Curtis Robb (GBR)	1:45.54
5.	Hezekiél Sepeng (RSA)	1:45.64
6.	Freddie Williams (CAN)	1:45.79
7.	William Tanui (KEN)	1:45.80
8.	Tom McKean (GBR)	1:46.17

== Semi-finals ==
- Held on Sunday 1993-08-15

RANK	HEAT 1	TIME
1.	Billy Konchellah (KEN)	1:45.04
2.	Freddie Williams (CAN)	1:45.13
3.	Hezekiél Sepeng (RSA)	1:45.46
4.	Mahjoub Haïda (MAR)	1:45.66
5.	Atle Douglas (NOR)	1:46.54
6.	Nico Motchebon (GER)	1:46.58
7.	Martin Steele (GBR)	1:46.70
8.	Mark Everett (USA)	1:57.39

RANK	HEAT 2	TIME
1.	Giuseppe D'Urso (ITA)	1:44.92
2.	Curtis Robb (GBR)	1:45.05
3.	Paul Ruto (KEN)	1:45.05
4.	Nathan Kahan (BEL)	1:45.75
5.	Ivan Komar (BLR)	1:45.76
6.	José Luíz Barbosa (BRA)	1:45.92
7.	Vebjørn Rodal (NOR)	1:46.50
8.	Johnny Gray (USA)	1:50.89

RANK	HEAT 3	TIME
1.	Tom McKean (GBR)	1:45.64
2.	William Tanui (KEN)	1:45.74
3.	Clive Terrelonge (JAM)	1:45.75
4.	José Parrilla (USA)	1:45.89
5.	Marko Koers (NED)	1:45.90
6.	Ari Suhonen (FIN)	1:46.35
7.	Kennedy Osei (GHA)	1:46.48
8.	Luis Javier González (ESP)	1:47.29

== Qualifying heats ==
- Held on Saturday 1993-08-14

RANK	HEAT 1	TIME
1.	Hezekiél Sepeng (RSA)	1:46.27
2.	Johnny Gray (USA)	1:46.28
3.	Luis Javier González (ESP)	1:46.36
4.	Marko Koers (NED)	1:46.37
5.	Gilmar da Silva Santos (BRA)	1:51.04
6.	Christopher Blackburn (MRI)	1:52.78
7.	Juan Jose Tapia (PAN)	1:52.99

RANK	HEAT 2	TIME
1.	José Luíz Barbosa (BRA)	1:46.12
2.	Ivan Komar (BLR)	1:46.40
3.	Billy Konchellah (KEN)	1:46.53
4.	Vebjørn Rodal (NOR)	1:46.57
5.	Jose Parrilla (USA)	1:46.94
6.	Lee Jin-il (KOR)	1:47.99
7.	Gop Bahadur Adhikari (NEP)	1:51.74
8.	Mukundi Mubenga (ZAI)	1:55.83

RANK	HEAT 3	TIME
1.	Atle Douglas (NOR)	1:49.43
2.	Ari Suhonen (FIN)	1:49.44
3.	William Tanui (KEN)	1:49.51
4.	Tomás de Teresa (ESP)	1:49.79
5.	Anatoliy Makarevich (BLR)	1:50.65
6.	Dale Jones (ATG)	1:51.02
7.	Naseer Ismail (MDV)	2:02.70

RANK	HEAT 4	TIME
1.	Kennedy Osei (GHA)	1:48.65
2.	Curtis Robb (GBR)	1:49.29
3.	Clive Terrelonge (JAM)	1:50.08
4.	Adoum Terap (CHA)	1:53.61
	Andrea Benvenuti (ITA)	DNF
	Charles Nkazamyampi (BDI)	DNS
	Tommy Asinga (SUR)	DNS

RANK	HEAT 5	TIME
1.	Giuseppe D'Urso (ITA)	1:48.79
2.	Tom McKean (GBR)	1:48.79
3.	Mark Everett (USA)	1:48.89
4.	Abdi Bile (SOM)	1:48.90
5.	Farah Ibrahim (QAT)	1:49.86
6.	Mbiganyi Thee (BOT)	1:49.91
7.	Carlos Mairena (NCA)	1:52.01

RANK	HEAT 6	TIME
1.	Mahjoub Haïda (MAR)	1:46.35
2.	Paul Ruto (KEN)	1:46.41
3.	Martin Steele (GBR)	1:46.47
4.	Freddie Williams (CAN)	1:46.63
5.	Nathan Kahan (BEL)	1:46.72
6.	Nico Motchebon (GER)	1:46.94
7.	Ali Khazaal (LIB)	1:57.15

== See also ==
- 1992 Men's Olympic 800 metres
