= 1993 IAAF World Indoor Championships – Men's 800 metres =

The men's 800 metres event at the 1993 IAAF World Indoor Championships was held on 12, 13 and 14 March.

== Medalists ==
Gold	Silver	Bronze
Tom McKean; Great Britain	Charles Nkazamyampi; Burundi	Nico Motchebon; Germany

== Results ==
=== Heats ===
First 2 of each heat (Q) and next 4 fastest (q) qualified for the semifinals.

Rank	Heat	Name	Nationality	Time	Notes
1	1	Tom McKean	Great Britain	1:49.09	Q
2	1	Luc Bernaert	Belgium	1:49.25	Q
3	1	José Luíz Barbosa	Brazil	1:49.34	q
4	4	Charles Nkazamyampi	Burundi	1:49.52	Q
5	4	Nico Motchebon	Germany	1:49.52	Q
6	4	Lee Jin-il	South Korea	1:49.60	q
7	3	Freddie Williams	Canada	1:49.71	Q
8	3	Jack Armour	United States	1:49.99	Q
9	1	Pablo Squella	Chile	1:50.11	q
10	3	Kennedy Osei	Ghana	1:50.14	q, NR
11	2	Mbiganyi Thee	Botswana	1:50.50	Q, NR
12	2	Giuseppe D'Urso	Italy	1:50.52	Q
13	3	Khalifa Kasmi	Morocco	1:50.57	
14	1	Ray Brown	United States	1:50.60	
15	2	Martin Steele	Great Britain	1:50.71	
15	3	Gilmar Santos	Brazil	1:50.71	
17	2	Hezekiél Sepeng	South Africa	1:50.79	
18	4	Leon Haan	Netherlands	1:50.87	
19	2	Paul Ruto	Kenya	1:50.94	
20	3	Luis Migueles	Argentina	1:51.03	
21	4	Michael Wildner	Austria	1:51.59	
22	4	Mukundi Mubenga	Zaire	1:55.35	NR

=== Semifinals ===
First 2 of each semifinal (Q) and the next 2 fastest (q) qualified for the final.

Rank	Heat	Name	Nationality	Time	Notes
1	2	Tom McKean	Great Britain	1:47.05	Q
2	2	Freddie Williams	Canada	1:47.93	Q
3	2	Nico Motchebon	Germany	1:47.98	q
4	1	Charles Nkazamyampi	Burundi	1:48.17	Q
5	2	Luc Bernaert	Belgium	1:48.24	q
6	1	José Luíz Barbosa	Brazil	1:48.56	Q
7	1	Mbiganyi Thee	Botswana	1:48.56	NR
8	1	Jack Armour	United States	1:49.03	
9	2	Kennedy Osei	Ghana	1:49.80	NR
10	1	Giuseppe D'Urso	Italy	1:50.07	
11	1	Pablo Squella	Chile	1:50.25	
12	2	Lee Jin-il	South Korea	1:50.46	

=== Final ===
Rank	Name	Nationality	Time	Notes
1st place, gold medalist(s)	Tom McKean	Great Britain	1:47.29	
2nd place, silver medalist(s)	Charles Nkazamyampi	Burundi	1:47.62	
3rd place, bronze medalist(s)	Nico Motchebon	Germany	1:48.15	
4	Luc Bernaert	Belgium	1:48.30	
5	Freddie Williams	Canada	1:51.26	
	José Luíz Barbosa	Brazil	DNF	
