= Athletics at the 1992 Summer Olympics – Men's 800 metres =

Men's 800 metres at the Games of the XXV Olympiad
- Venue: Estadi Olimpíc de Montjuïc
- Dates: August 1–5
- Competitors: 59 from 49 nations
- Winning time: 1:43.66

Medalists
1st place, gold medalist(s)		William Tanui; Kenya
2nd place, silver medalist(s)		Nixon Kiprotich; Kenya
3rd place, bronze medalist(s)		Johnny Gray; United States

Official Video Highlights @ 10:40

The men's 800 metres was an event at the 1992 Summer Olympics in Barcelona, Spain. There were a total number of 59 participating athletes from 48 nations, with eight qualifying heats. The maximum number of athletes per nation had been set at 3 since the 1930 Olympic Congress. The event was won by 0.04 seconds by William Tanui of Kenya, the second straight Games in which a Kenyan man won the 800 metres. Johnny Gray returned the United States to podium after a 16-year absence.

== Summary ==
Johnny Gray took the race out to the "Gray zone" running the first lap in 49.9 hoping to burn off the competition. His only follower was José Luíz Barbosa with Nixon Kiprotich and William Tanui trailing a clear breakaway from the rest of the field. Entering the final turn, Gray stumbled for a moment, losing momentum, but a straining Barbosa could not take advantage. Through the turn, the two Kenyans Tanui and Kiprotich worked their way around Barbosa, with Tanui challenging Gray for the lead. At first Gray was able to head off the challenge but Tanui kept coming and the depleted Gray could not hold on. Kiprotich, only a time qualifier from his semi, closed late on his teammate, passing Gray for silver.

== Background ==
This was the 22nd appearance of the event, which is one of 12 athletics events to have been held at every Summer Olympics. Four finalists from 1988, including the champion, returned: gold medalist Paul Ereng of Kenya, fifth-place finisher Johnny Gray of the United States (also a finalist in 1984), sixth-place finisher José Luíz Barbosa of Brazil, and eighth-place finisher Nixon Kiprotich of Kenya. The Kenyan team was strong, even without two-time world champion Billy Konchellah (out due to asthma); William Tanui joined the two veterans.

Belize, the Central African Republic, the Maldives, Mauritania, and Vanuatu all appeared in the event for the first time. Twelve of the former Soviet republics competed together as the Unified Team. There was one Independent Olympic Participant from Yugoslavia. Unified Yemen appeared for the first time, though North Yemen had competed previously. Great Britain made its 21st appearance, most among all nations, having had no competitors in the event only in the 1904 Games in St. Louis.

== Competition format ==
The men's 800 metres returned to a smaller field with only three rounds, the most common format since 1912, after two Games of a four-round format. The "fastest loser" system introduced in 1964 was used for the first two rounds. There were eight first-round heats, each with 7 or 8 athletes; the top two runners in each heat as well as the next eight fastest overall advanced to the semifinals. There were three semifinals with 8 athletes each; the top two runners in each semifinal and the next two fastest overall advanced to the eight-man final.

== Records ==
Prior to the competition, the existing World and Olympic records were as follows.

World record	Sebastian Coe (GBR)	1:41.73	Florence, Italy	10 June 1981
Olympic record	Joaquim Cruz (BRA)	1:43.00	Los Angeles, United States	6 August 1984

No world or Olympic records were set during the competition.

The following national records were established during the competition:

Nation	Athlete	Round	Time
Central African Republic	Zacharia Maidjida	Heat 5	1:50.41

== Schedule ==
All times are Central European Summer Time (UTC+2)

Date	Time	Round
Saturday, 1 August 1992	18:45	Round 1
Sunday, 2 August 1992	20:30	Semifinals
Wednesday, 5 August 1992	21:05	Final

== Results ==
=== Round 1 ===
==== Heat 1 ====
Rank	Athlete	Nation	Time	Notes
1	Piotr Piekarski	Poland	1:48.51	Q
2	Mark Everett	United States	1:48.65	Q
3	Lee Jin-Il	South Korea	1:48.68	
4	Mahjoub Haida	Morocco	1:48.72	
5	Jörg Haas	Germany	1:50.42	
6	Symphorien Samba	Republic of the Congo	1:51.75	
7	Mohamed Salem Al-Tunaiji	United Arab Emirates	1:53.91	
8	Ilunga Kafila	Zaire	1:57.73	

==== Heat 2 ====
Rank	Athlete	Nation	Time	Notes
1	Tom McKean	Great Britain	1:47.85	Q
2	Atle Douglas	Norway	1:48.08	Q
3	Freddie Williams	Canada	1:48.20	
4	Frédéric Cornette	France	1:48.22	
5	Eversley Linley	Saint Vincent and the Grenadines	1:52.49	
6	Chérif Baba Aidara	Mauritania	1:56.41	
7	Bassam Kawas	Lebanon	1:58.71	
8	Hussain Riyaz	Maldives	2:00.93	

==== Heat 3 ====
Rank	Athlete	Nation	Time	Notes
1	Johnny Gray	United States	1:46.62	Q
2	Tomas de Teresa	Spain	1:46.78	Q
3	Babacar Niang	Senegal	1:46.69	q
4	Tommy Asinga	Suriname	1:47.23	q
5	Vebjørn Rodal	Norway	1:48.00	q
6	Terap Adoum Yaya	Chad	1:54.43	
7	Baptiste Firiam	Vanuatu	1:57.96	

==== Heat 4 ====
Rank	Athlete	Nation	Time	Notes
1	William Tanui	Kenya	1:47.02	Q
2	Kennedy Osei	Ghana	1:47.17	Q
3	Sipho Dlamini	Swaziland	1:48.70	
4	José Arconada	Spain	1:49.23	
5	Mohamed Sy Savané	Guinea	1:51.80	
—	Idrissou Tamimou	Benin	DSQ	
—	Giuseppe D'Urso	Italy	DNS	

==== Heat 5 ====
Rank	Athlete	Nation	Time	Notes
1	Curtis Robb	Great Britain	1:46.16	Q
2	Clive Terrelonge	Jamaica	1:46.64	Q
3	Luis Javier González	Spain	1:46.65	q
4	Paul Ereng	Kenya	1:46.65	q
5	João Baptista Ntyamba	Angola	1:48.54	
6	Zacharia Maidjida	Central African Republic	1:50.41	NR
7	Emiliano Buale	Equatorial Guinea	1:58.95	
—	Baba Njie	The Gambia	DNS	

==== Heat 6 ====
Rank	Athlete	Nation	Time	Notes
1	Nixon Kiprotich	Kenya	1:47.45	Q
2	Andrea Benvenuti	Italy	1:47.58	Q
3	Mbiganyi Thee	Botswana	1:48.04	q
4	Robin van Helden	Netherlands	1:48.05	q
5	Dale Anthony Jones	Antigua and Barbuda	1:50.43	
6	Melford Homela	Zimbabwe	1:50.50	
7	Abdullah Mohamed Al-Anbari	Oman	1:50.72	
8	Khambieng Khamiar	Laos	2:02.45	

==== Heat 7 ====
Rank	Athlete	Nation	Time	Notes
1	José Luíz Barbosa	Brazil	1:46.16	Q
2	Reda Abdenouz	Algeria	1:46.82	Q
3	Mohamed Ismail Yousuf	Qatar	1:49.32	
4	Slobodan Popovic	Independent Olympic Participants	1:49.69	
5	António Abrantes	Portugal	1:50.89	
6	Desmond Hector	Guyana	1:51.43	
—	John Maurice Palacio	Belize	DSQ	

==== Heat 8 ====
Rank	Athlete	Nation	Time	Notes
1	Steve Heard	Great Britain	1:46.42	Q
2	Marko Koers	Netherlands	1:46.88	Q
3	Anatoly Makarevich	Unified Team	1:47.30	q
4	José Parrilla	United States	1:48.17	
5	Prince Amara	Sierra Leone	1:51.76	
6	Stevon Roberts	Barbados	1:52.30	
7	Anwar Mohamed	Yemen	1:52.71	
8	Francis Munthali	Malawi	1:56.69	

=== Semifinals ===
==== Semifinal 1 ====
Rank	Athlete	Nation	Time	Notes
1	Johnny Gray	United States	1:45.66	Q
2	Andrea Benvenuti	Italy	1:45.80	Q
3	Nixon Kiprotich	Kenya	1:46.02	q
4	Tomas de Teresa	Spain	1:46.08	
5	Mbiganyi Thee	Botswana	1:46.13	
6	Steve Heard	Great Britain	1:46.19	
7	Anatoly Makarevich	Unified Team	1:46.69	
8	Tommy Asinga	Suriname	1:46.78	

==== Semifinal 2 ====
Rank	Athlete	Nation	Time	Notes
1	Curtis Robb	Great Britain	1:45.25	Q
2	José Luíz Barbosa	Brazil	1:45.32	Q
3	Reda Abdenouz	Algeria	1:46.06	q
4	Kennedy Osei	Ghana	1:46.20	
5	Robin van Helden	Netherlands	1:46.98	
6	Luis Javier González	Spain	1:47.09	
7	Atle Douglas	Norway	1:48.63	
8	Paul Ereng	Kenya	1:49.90	

==== Semifinal 3 ====
Rank	Athlete	Nation	Time	Notes
1	William Tanui	Kenya	1:46.59	Q
2	Mark Everett	United States	1:46.94	Q
3	Babacar Niang	Senegal	1:46.95	
4	Tom McKean	Great Britain	1:48.77	
5	Vebjørn Rodal	Norway	1:49.53	
6	Clive Terrelonge	Jamaica	1:51.03	
7	Marko Koers	Netherlands	1:52.23	
—	Piotr Piekarski	Poland	DSQ	

=== Final ===
The final was held on August 5, 1992.

Tanui's winning margin of 0.04 seconds remains the smallest winning margin in the history of the event.

Rank	Athlete	Nation	Time
1st place, gold medalist(s)	William Tanui	Kenya	1:43.66
2nd place, silver medalist(s)	Nixon Kiprotich	Kenya	1:43.70
3rd place, bronze medalist(s)	Johnny Gray	United States	1:43.97
4	José Luíz Barbosa	Brazil	1:45.06
5	Andrea Benvenuti	Italy	1:45.23
6	Curtis Robb	Great Britain	1:45.57
7	Reda Abdenouz	Algeria	1:48.34
—	Mark Everett	United States	DNF

== See also ==
- 1990 Men's European Championships 800 metres (Split)
- 1991 Men's World Championships 800 metres (Tokyo)
- 1993 Men's World Championships 800 metres (Stuttgart)
- 1994 Men's European Championships 800 metres (Helsinki)
