= 1991 World Championships in Athletics – Men's 800 metres =

These are the official results of the Men's 800 metres event at the 1991 IAAF World Championships in Tokyo, Japan. There were a total number of 42 participating athletes, with three qualifying heats, two semi-finals and the final held on Tuesday August 27, 1991.

In the final, against character, Mark Everett, in a dark blue USA uniform took the lead at the break squeezing out José Luíz Barbosa. Along the home stretch, Johnny Gray in a white USA uniform worked his way around Barbosa and then Everett to take the lead just before the bell completing the first lap in 51.01. Through the turn, Barbosa passed Everett, followed by Paul Ereng and eventually most of the field as Everett went backward. As Piotr Piekarski was the sixth runner to go by Everett, he began to resist. At the beginning of the final turn, Barbosa caught Gray and went around, followed closely by Ereng, Gray began straining, his long strides half speed to the others who were running around him. Billy Konchellah was the next to pass Gray through the turn and sprinting wide on the outside, Everett had come back to challenge. Barbosa had a 2-meter lead and was running along the rail for the finish, followed by Ereng. Barbosa steadily pulled away from Ereng but Konchellah sprinting along the outside made up 5 metres and caught Barbosa 6 metres before the finish line to take the win. Behind him, Everett came sprinting, arm flopping, past Ereng to take the bronze.

== Medalists ==
Gold	Billy Konchellah; Kenya (KEN)
Silver	José Luíz Barbosa; Brazil (BRA)
Bronze	Mark Everett; United States (CAN)

== Schedule ==
- All times are Japan Standard Time (UTC+9)

Heats
25.08.1991 – 17:35h
Semifinals
26.08.1991 – 18:15h
Final
27.08.1991 – 19:50h

== Records ==
Existing records at the start of the event.

World Record	Sebastian Coe (GBR)	1:41.73	Florence, Italy	June 10, 1981
Championship Record	Billy Konchellah (KEN)	1:43.06	Rome, Italy	September 1, 1987

== Final ==
RANK	FINAL	TIME
	Billy Konchellah (KEN)	1:43.99
	José Luíz Barbosa (BRA)	1:44.24
	Mark Everett (USA)	1:44.67
4.	Paul Ereng (KEN)	1:44.75
5.	Piotr Piekarski (POL)	1:45.44
6.	Johnny Gray (USA)	1:45.67
7.	Andrey Sudnik (URS)	1:46.36
8.	Tomás de Teresa (ESP)	1:47.65

== Semi-finals ==
- Held on Monday 1991-08-26

RANK	HEAT 1	TIME
1.	Billy Konchellah (KEN)	1:46.86
2.	Mark Everett (USA)	1:46.96
3.	Johnny Gray (USA)	1:47.04
4.	Piotr Piekarski (POL)	1:47.14
5.	Freddie Williams (CAN)	1:47.17
6.	Robert Kibet (KEN)	1:47.36
7.	Frédéric Cornette (FRA)	1:48.04
8.	Steve Heard (GBR)	1:49.91

RANK	HEAT 2	TIME
1.	José Luíz Barbosa (BRA)	1:45.42
2.	Paul Ereng (KEN)	1:45.84
3.	Tomás de Teresa (ESP)	1:45.84
4.	Andrey Sudnik (URS)	1:45.91
5.	George Kersh (USA)	1:45.98
6.	Mbiganyi Thee (BOT)	1:46.30
7.	Joachim Dehmel (GER)	1:47.91
8.	Brian Whittle (GBR)	1:54.14

== Qualifying heats ==
- Held on Sunday 1991-08-25

RANK	HEAT 1	TIME
1.	Billy Konchellah (KEN)	1:47.35
2.	Mark Everett (USA)	1:47.37
3.	Tom McKean (GBR)	1:47.38
4.	Desta Asgedom (ETH)	1:48.28
5.	Fabian Franco (GIB)	1:54.29
6.	Charles Nkazamyampi (BDI)	4:13.28
	Ismail Mohamed Youssef (QAT)	DQ

RANK	HEAT 2	TIME
1.	Paul Ereng (KEN)	1:45.94
2.	Tomás de Teresa (ESP)	1:46.41
3.	Slobodan Popović (YUG)	1:46.89
4.	Valeriy Starodubtsev (URS)	1:47.55
5.	Ari Suhonen (FIN)	1:48.15
6.	Luis Martinez (GUA)	1:49.07 (NR)
	Ibrahim Okash (SOM)	DNS

RANK	HEAT 3	TIME
1.	Robert Kibet (KEN)	1:50.13
2.	Brian Whittle (GBR)	1:50.30
3.	Luis Javier González (ESP)	1:50.46
4.	Reda Abdenouz (ALG)	1:50.47
5.	Pablo Squella (CHI)	1:50.92
6.	Luis Migueles (ARG)	1:51.42
7.	Samson Vallabouy (MAS)	1:51.46

RANK	HEAT 4	TIME
1.	George Kersh (USA)	1:47.00
2.	Frédéric Cornette (FRA)	1:47.02
3.	Ahmed Belkessam (ALG)	1:47.06
4.	Esko Parpala (FIN)	1:47.28
5.	Babacar Niang (SEN)	1:47.75
6.	Dale Jones (ATG)	1:48.62
	Dieudonné Kwizera (BDI)	DNS

RANK	HEAT 5	TIME
1.	José Luíz Barbosa (BRA)	1:45.68
2.	Freddie Williams (CAN)	1:45.83
3.	Mbiganyi Thee (BOT)	1:45.94
4.	Joachim Dehmel (GER)	1:46.24
5.	Steve Heard (GBR)	1:46.29
6.	Tommy Asinga (SUR)	1:47.33
	João N'Tyamba (ANG)	DQ

RANK	HEAT 6	TIME
1.	Johnny Gray (USA)	1:46.59
2.	Piotr Piekarski (POL)	1:46.63
3.	Andrey Sudnik (URS)	1:46.77
4.	Giuseppe D'Urso (ITA)	1:46.82
5.	Markus Trinkler (SUI)	1:47.67
6.	Antonio Abrantes (POR)	1:47.91
7.	Douglas Kalembo (ZAM)	1:48.26

== See also ==
- 1988 Men's Olympic 800 metres (Seoul)
- 1990 Men's European Championships 800 metres (Split)
- 1992 Men's Olympic 800 metres (Barcelona)
- 1993 Men's World Championships 800 metres (Stuttgart)
