= Athletics at the 1994 Commonwealth Games – Men's 800 metres =

Men's 800 metres at the Commonwealth Games

The men's 800 metres event at the 1994 Commonwealth Games was held on 23, 24 and 26 August at the Centennial Stadium in Victoria, British Columbia.

== Medalists ==
Gold	Silver	Bronze
Patrick Konchellah; Kenya	Hezekiél Sepeng; South Africa	Savieri Ngidhi; Zimbabwe

== Results ==
=== Heats ===
Rank	Heat	Name	Nationality	Time	Notes
1	2	William Serem	Kenya	1:46.12	Q
2	2	Craig Winrow	England	1:47.06	Q
3	3	Brendan Hanigan	Australia	1:47.23	Q
4	2	Hezekiél Sepeng	South Africa	1:47.28	Q
5	3	Julius Achon	Uganda	1:47.32	Q
6	3	Tom McKean	Scotland	1:47.46	Q
7	2	William Best	Canada	1:47.48	q
8	3	Ndumiso Mdziniso	Swaziland	1:47.49	q
9	2	Davey Wilson	Northern Ireland	1:47.57	q
10	4	Kennedy Osei	Ghana	1:47.81	Q
11	1	Patrick Konchellah	Kenya	1:47.96	Q
12	4	Savieri Ngidhi	Zimbabwe	1:48.06	Q
13	3	Andrew Lill	England	1:48.34	q
14	4	Martin Steele	England	1:48.35	Q
15	1	Jurgens Kotze	South Africa	1:48.54	Q
16	1	Michael Nootebos	Canada	1:48.62	Q
17	4	Mario Watson	Jamaica	1:48.75	
18	2	Andrew Beecher	Jamaica	1:48.82	
19	1	Clive Terrelonge	Jamaica	1:48.87	
20	2	Michael Guegan	Jersey	1:48.90	
21	1	Ronald Thorne	Barbados	1:49.06	
22	3	Barnabas Samoei	Kenya	1:49.14	
23	4	Dean Kenneally	Australia	1:49.26	
24	1	Gareth Brown	Scotland	1:49.61	
25	3	Cedric Harris	Dominica	1:52.66	
26	4	Dario Clément	Mauritius	1:56.19	
27	1	Paea Funaki	Tonga	1:56.85	
	4	David Strang	Scotland	DNS	

=== Semifinals ===
Rank	Heat	Name	Nationality	Time	Notes
1	2	Patrick Konchellah	Kenya	1:46.88	Q
2	2	Craig Winrow	England	1:47.84	Q
3	2	Tom McKean	Scotland	1:47.99	Q
4	2	Martin Steele	England	1:48.17	Q
5	2	Ndumiso Mdziniso	Swaziland	1:48.19	
6	2	Jurgens Kotze	South Africa	1:48.39	
7	2	Kennedy Osei	Ghana	1:48.94	
8	1	Brendan Hanigan	Australia	1:49.00	Q
9	1	Savieri Ngidhi	Zimbabwe	1:49.08	Q
10	1	Hezekiél Sepeng	South Africa	1:49.14	Q
11	1	William Serem	Kenya	1:49.32	Q
12	1	Andrew Lill	England	1:49.62	
13	2	Michael Nootebos	Canada	1:49.93	
14	1	William Best	Canada	1:49.97	
15	1	Julius Achon	Uganda	1:49.98	
16	1	Davey Wilson	Northern Ireland	1:50.43	

=== Final ===
Rank	Name	Nationality	Time	Notes
1st place, gold medalist(s)	Patrick Konchellah	Kenya	1:45.18	
2nd place, silver medalist(s)	Hezekiél Sepeng	South Africa	1:45.76	
3rd place, bronze medalist(s)	Savieri Ngidhi	Zimbabwe	1:46.06	
4	Craig Winrow	England	1:46.91	
5	Brendan Hanigan	Australia	1:47.24	
6	William Serem	Kenya	1:47.30	
7	Martin Steele	England	1:48.04	
8	Tom McKean	Scotland	1:50.81	
