= 1991 IAAF World Indoor Championships – Men's 800 metres =

The men's 800 metres event at the 1991 IAAF World Indoor Championships was held on 8, 9 and 10 March.

== Medalists ==
Gold	Silver	Bronze
Paul Ereng; Kenya	Tomás de Teresa; Spain	Simon Hoogewerf; Canada

== Results ==
=== Heats ===
First 2 of each heat (Q) and next 2 fastest (q) qualified for the semifinals.

Rank	Heat	Name	Nationality	Time	Notes
1	1	William Tanui	Kenya	1:47.55	Q
2	4	Simon Hoogewerf	Canada	1:48.21	Q, NR
3	5	Joachim Dehmel	Germany	1:48.23	Q
4	5	Martin Steele	Great Britain	1:48.28	Q
5	5	Stanley Redwine	United States	1:48.61	q
6	1	Miroslav Chochkov	Bulgaria	1:48.74	Q
7	5	Peter Svaricek	Austria	1:48.80	q
8	5	Luis Migueles	Argentina	1:49.00	NR
9	4	Pablo Squella	Chile	1:49.07	Q
10	1	Ikem Billy	Great Britain	1:49.09	
11	1	Markus Trinkler	Switzerland	1:49.13	
12	4	Valeriy Starodubtsev	Soviet Union	1:49.35	
13	4	Ray Brown	United States	1:49.52	
14	2	Ahmed Belkessam	Algeria	1:50.41	Q
15	3	Paul Ereng	Kenya	1:50.48	Q
16	2	Andrey Sudnik	Soviet Union	1:50.51	Q
17	3	Tomás de Teresa	Spain	1:50.56	Q
18	2	Ton Baltus	Netherlands	1:50.78	
19	2	Charles Nkazamyampi	Burundi	1:50.80	
20	3	Jussi Udelhoven	Germany	1:50.83	
21	2	Róbert Banai	Hungary	1:51.10	
22	1	Luis Javier González	Spain	1:51.47	
23	3	Mbiganyi Thee	Botswana	1:51.89	NR
24	3	Nadar Khan	Pakistan	1:52.08	NR
25	4	Morris Okinda	Tanzania	1:55.42	NR
26	1	Jean-Bosco Mondzomba	Republic of the Congo	1:56.23	NR

=== Semifinals ===
First 3 of each semifinal (Q) qualified directly for the final.

Rank	Heat	Name	Nationality	Time	Notes
1	2	William Tanui	Kenya	1:47.74	Q
2	2	Joachim Dehmel	Germany	1:48.17	Q
3	2	Stanley Redwine	United States	1:48.34	Q
4	2	Miroslav Chochkov	Bulgaria	1:48.40	
5	2	Martin Steele	Great Britain	1:48.77	
6	1	Tomás de Teresa	Spain	1:49.80	Q
7	1	Paul Ereng	Kenya	1:49.96	Q
8	1	Simon Hoogewerf	Canada	1:50.04	Q
9	1	Andrey Sudnik	Soviet Union	1:50.08	
10	1	Ahmed Belkessam	Algeria	1:50.18	
11	2	Pablo Squella	Chile	1:50.60	
12	1	Peter Svaricek	Austria	1:53.12	

=== Final ===
Rank	Name	Nationality	Time	Notes
1st place, gold medalist(s)	Paul Ereng	Kenya	1:47.08	
2nd place, silver medalist(s)	Tomás de Teresa	Spain	1:47.82	
3rd place, bronze medalist(s)	Simon Hoogewerf	Canada	1:47.88	NR
4	Stanley Redwine	United States	1:47.98	
5	Joachim Dehmel	Germany	1:50.58	
	William Tanui	Kenya	DQ	

Note: William Tanui had originally won in 1:46.94, but was later disqualified for breaking from his lane too early.
