= Athletics at the 1990 Commonwealth Games – Men's 1500 metres =

Men's 1500 metres at the Commonwealth Games

The men's 1500 metres event at the 1990 Commonwealth Games was held on 2 and 3 February at the Mount Smart Stadium in Auckland.

== Medalists ==
Gold	Silver	Bronze
Peter Elliott; England	Wilfred Kirochi; Kenya	Peter O'Donoghue; New Zealand

== Results ==
=== Heats ===
Qualification: First 5 of each heat (Q) and the next 2 fastest (q) qualified for the final.

Rank	Heat	Name	Nationality	Time	Notes
1	1	Peter Elliott	England	3:42.88	Q
2	2	Joseph Cheshire	Kenya	3:43.05	Q
3	2	Simon Doyle	Australia	3:43.15	Q
4	1	Tony Morrell	England	3:43.28	Q
5	2	John Walker	New Zealand	3:43.29	Q
6	2	Dave Campbell	Canada	3:43.39	Q
7	1	Wilfred Kirochi	Kenya	3:43.46	Q
8	1	Peter O'Donoghue	New Zealand	3:43.54	Q
9	2	Ian Hamer	Wales	3:43.55	Q
10	2	William Tanui	Kenya	3:43.62	q
11	1	Pat Scammell	Australia	3:44.22	Q
12	2	Mbiganyi Thee	Botswana	3:44.39	q
13	1	Alan Bunce	New Zealand	3:45.52	
14	1	Mark Kirk	Northern Ireland	3:46.50	
15	2	Linton McKenzie	Jamaica	3:48.74	
16	1	Neil Horsfield	Wales	3:49.34	
17	1	Colin Mathieson	Canada	3:50.66	
18	1	Wilson Theleso	Botswana	3:50.83	
19	1	Melford Homela	Zimbabwe	3:50.89	
20	2	Gary Barber	Canada	3:53.76	
21	2	John Siguria	Papua New Guinea	4:05.49	
	1	Ancel Nalau	Vanuatu	DNS	
	2	Sebastian Coe	England	DNS	

=== Final ===
Rank	Name	Nationality	Time	Notes
1st place, gold medalist(s)	Peter Elliott	England	3:33.39	
2nd place, silver medalist(s)	Wilfred Kirochi	Kenya	3:34.41	
3rd place, bronze medalist(s)	Peter O'Donoghue	New Zealand	3:35.14	
4	Simon Doyle	Australia	3:35.70	
5	Tony Morrell	England	3:35.87	
6	William Tanui	Kenya	3:37.77	
7	Joseph Cheshire	Kenya	3:40.58	
8	Mbiganyi Thee	Botswana	3:44.34	
9	Ian Hamer	Wales	3:46.23	
10	Dave Campbell	Canada	3:50.07	
11	Pat Scammell	Australia	3:50.47	
12	John Walker	New Zealand	3:53.77	
