= Mbiganyi Thee =

Personal information
- Born: 26 May 1962 (age 64)
- Height: 1.94 m (6 ft 4 in)
- Weight: 72 kg (159 lb)

Sport
- Sport: Athletics
- Events: 800 m, 1500 m

Mbiganyi Thee (born 26 May 1962) is a retired athlete from Botswana who specialised in the middle-distance events. He represented his country at the 1988 and 1992 Summer Olympics, as well as two outdoor and four indoor World Championships.

== Competition record ==
Year	Competition	Venue	Position	Event	Notes
Representing Botswana
1986	Commonwealth Games	Edinburgh, United Kingdom	14th (h)	1500 m	3:36.13
1987	World Indoor Championships	Indianapolis, United States	11th (h)	1500 m	3:44.33
1988	Olympic Games	Seoul, South Korea	19th (sf)	1500 m	3:42.62
1989	World Indoor Championships	Budapest, Hungary	20th (h)	1500 m	3:48.85
1990	Commonwealth Games	Auckland, New Zealand	10th (sf)	800 m	1:48.33
1990	Commonwealth Games	Auckland, New Zealand	8th	1500 m	3:44.34
1991	World Indoor Championships	Seville, Spain	23rd (h)	800 m	1:51.89
1991	World Championships	Tokyo, Japan	6th (sf)	800 m	1:46.30
1991	World Championships	Tokyo, Japan	29th (h)	1500 m	3:45.04
1992	Olympic Games	Barcelona, Spain	8th (sf)	800 m	1:46.13
1993	World Indoor Championships	Toronto, Canada	7th (sf)	800 m	1:48.56
1993	World Championships	Stuttgart, Germany	28th (h)	800 m	1:49.91

== Personal bests ==
Outdoor

- 800 metres – 1:45.94 (Tokyo 1991)
- 1000 metres – 2:19.19 (Auckland 1990) NR
- 1500 metres – 3:40.60 (London 1991)

Indoor

- 800 metres – 1:48.95 (Toronto 1993)
- 1500 metres – 3:44.33 (Indianapolis 1987) NR
