= 1989 IAAF World Indoor Championships – Men's 800 metres =

The men's 800 metres event at the 1989 IAAF World Indoor Championships was held at the Budapest Sportcsarnok in Budapest on 3 and 4 March.

== Medalists ==
Gold	Silver	Bronze
Paul Ereng; Kenya	José Luíz Barbosa; Brazil	Tonino Viali; Italy

== Results ==
=== Heats ===
The winner of each heat (Q) and next 8 fastest (q) qualified for the semifinals.

Rank	Heat	Name	Nationality	Time	Notes
1	3	Paul Ereng	Kenya	1:47.99	Q
2	3	Rob Druppers	Netherlands	1:48.29	q
3	4	Tonino Viali	Italy	1:48.45	Q
4	4	Andrey Sudnik	Soviet Union	1:48.54	q
5	4	Ray Brown	United States	1:48.62	q
6	3	Pablo Squella	Chile	1:48.77	q
7	4	William Wuyke	Venezuela	1:48.97	q
8	3	Stanley Redwine	United States	1:49.04	q
9	2	Ikem Billy	Great Britain	1:49.49	Q
10	1	José Luíz Barbosa	Brazil	1:49.55	Q
11	1	Joachim Heydgen	West Germany	1:49.70	q
12	1	Steve Heard	Great Britain	1:49.71	q
13	2	Feranswa Woldemariam	Ethiopia	1:49.74	NR
14	2	Markus Trinkler	Switzerland	1:49.79	
15	3	Simon Hoogewerf	Canada	1:49.98	
16	1	Tomás de Teresa	Spain	1:50.19	
17	2	Claude Diomar	France	1:50.20	
18	4	Hamid Sajjadi	Iran	1:51.21	AR
19	2	Belkanem Lardou	Morocco	1:51.49	
20	3	Luis Migueles	Argentina	1:51.58	
21	2	Boby Gaseisiwe	Botswana	1:53.72	NR
	1	Getahun Ayana	Ethiopia	DNF	

=== Semifinals ===
First 3 of each semifinal (Q) qualified directly for the final.

Rank	Heat	Name	Nationality	Time	Notes
1	2	José Luíz Barbosa	Brazil	1:46.79	Q, CR
2	2	Paul Ereng	Kenya	1:47.11	Q, NR
3	2	Ray Brown	United States	1:47.24	Q
4	2	Andrey Sudnik	Soviet Union	1:49.01	
5	1	Tonino Viali	Italy	1:49.06	Q
6	1	Ikem Billy	Great Britain	1:49.28	Q
7	1	Stanley Redwine	United States	1:49.57	Q
8	1	Rob Druppers	Netherlands	1:49.70	
9	1	Joachim Heydgen	West Germany	1:49.71	
10	2	Steve Heard	Great Britain	1:50.75	
11	2	William Wuyke	Venezuela	1:53.52	
	1	Pablo Squella	Chile	DNF	

=== Final ===
Rank	Name	Nationality	Time	Notes
1st place, gold medalist(s)	Paul Ereng	Kenya	1:44.84	WR, CR
2nd place, silver medalist(s)	José Luíz Barbosa	Brazil	1:45.55	AR
3rd place, bronze medalist(s)	Tonino Viali	Italy	1:46.95	PB
4	Stanley Redwine	United States	1:47.54	PB
5	Ray Brown	United States	1:47.93	
6	Ikem Billy	Great Britain	1:48.97	
