= Curtis Robb =

British middle-distance runner

Personal information
- Nationality: British (English)
- Born: 7 June 1972 (age 54) Liverpool, England
- Height: 188 cm (6 ft 2 in)
- Weight: 75 kg (165 lb)

Sport
- Sport: Track
- Events: 800 meters, 1500 meters
- Club: Liverpool Harriers

Achievements and titles
- Personal bests: 800 metres: 1:44.92; 1500 metres: 3:38.56
Medal record
Representing Great Britain
Summer Universiade
Silver medal – second place	1991 Sheffield	800 m

Curtis Alexander Robb (born 7 June 1972) is a former middle distance runner, who competed at two consecutive Summer Olympics for Great Britain, in 1992 and 1996.

== Biography ==
Robb first began running with Liverpool Harriers & AC, a racing team based in Liverpool, at the age of 12. From the age of 17, he was coached by Ernie Gallagher, a former miler who had raced Roger Bannister in the 1950s.

Robb made his Olympic debut in the men's 800 meters at the 1992 Summer Olympics, where he finished sixth overall. At the 1993 World Championships in Athletics, Robb raced in the men's 800 metres, where he was involved in a controversy in his semi-final after cutting in front of Johnny Gray, with Gray losing his step. In the men's 800 at the 1996 Summer Olympics, Robb made it to the semifinal round, but did not make it to the final round.

Robb was a three-times British 800 metres champion after winning the British AAA Championships title at the 1992 AAA Championships,1995 AAA Championships and 1996 AAA Championships.

After his racing career, Robb became a surgeon.

In 2026, Robb stood trial at Chester Crown Court, accused of controlling and coercive behaviour towards his wife between 2015 and 2023; he was eventually acquitted of all charges.
