= Anwar Mohamed =

Anwar Mohamed may refer to:

- Anwar Mohamed (athlete)
- Anwar Mohamed (taekwondo)
