= Ray Brown (runner) =

American athletics competitor

Personal information
- Born: August 11, 1961 (age 64)

Sport
- Sport: Track and field
- Event: 800 metres

Ray Brown (born August 11, 1961) is a retired American middle-distance runner who competed primarily in the 800 meters. An indoor specialist, he represented his country at four consecutive World Indoor Championships starting in 1987 and made the final once, in 1989. In addition, he is a four-time national indoor champion.

Running for the Virginia Cavaliers track and field team, Brown finished 3rd in the 800 m at the 1982 NCAA Division I Outdoor Track and Field Championships.

== International competitions ==
Year	Competition	Venue	Position	Event	Notes
Representing the United States
1987	World Indoor Championships	Indianapolis, United States	7th (h)	800 m	1:50.13
1989	World Indoor Championships	Budapest, Hungary	5th	800 m	1:47.93
1991	World Indoor Championships	Seville, Spain	13th (h)	800 m	1:49.52
1993	World Indoor Championships	Toronto, Canada	14th (h)	800 m	1:50.60

== Personal bests ==
Outdoor

- 800 metres – 1:45.11 (Bern 1989)
- 1000 metres – 2:18.96 (Gateshead 1986)

Indoor

- 800 metres – 1:46.06 (Piraeus 1989)
- 1000 metres – 2:19.20 (East Rutherford 1988)
