= 1992 European Athletics Indoor Championships – Men's 800 metres =

The men's 800 metres event at the 1992 European Athletics Indoor Championships was held in Palasport di Genova on 28, 29 February and 1 March.

== Medalists ==
Gold	Silver	Bronze
Luis Javier González; Spain	José Arconada; Spain	Tonino Viali; Italy

== Results ==
=== Heats ===
First 2 from each heat (Q) and the next 4 fastest (q) qualified for the semifinals.

Rank	Heat	Name	Nationality	Time	Notes
1	1	Tonino Viali	Italy	1:48.21	Q
2	1	José Arconada	Spain	1:48.30	Q
3	1	Andrew Lill	Great Britain	1:48.38	q
4	3	Mark Eplinius	Germany	1:48.67	Q
5	3	Brian Whittle	Great Britain	1:48.79	Q
6	3	Václav Hrích	Czechoslovakia	1:48.80	q
7	2	Luis Javier González	Spain	1:49.00	Q
8	2	Martin Steele	Great Britain	1:49.23	Q
9	1	Peter Braun	Germany	1:49.43	q
10	2	Anatoliy Makarevich	Unified Team	1:49.50	q
11	2	Leon Haan	Netherlands	1:49.55	q
12	1	Rafko Marinič	Slovenia	1:49.98	
13	1	Declan Kennedy	Ireland	1:50.33	
14	3	Ari Suhonen	Finland	1:50.75	
15	3	Oscar Terol	Netherlands	1:50.84	
16	3	Slobodan Mijolović	Croatia	1:50.97	
17	4	Andrea Benvenuti	Italy	1:51.02	Q
18	4	Mike Kemsies	Germany	1:51.05	Q
19	4	Martin Enholm	Sweden	1:51.15	
20	2	António Abrantes	Portugal	1:51.36	
21	4	Miroslav Chochkov	Bulgaria	1:51.51	
22	4	Pavel Soukup	Czechoslovakia	1:51.53	
23	2	Davide Cadoni	Italy	1:56.43	

=== Semifinals ===
First 3 from each semifinal qualified directly (Q) for the final.

Rank	Heat	Name	Nationality	Time	Notes
1	1	Tonino Viali	Italy	1:46.47	Q
2	1	Brian Whittle	Great Britain	1:46.57	Q
3	1	Luis Javier González	Spain	1:46.62	Q
4	1	Mark Eplinius	Germany	1:46.63	
5	1	Peter Braun	Germany	1:47.19	PB
6	2	Anatoliy Makarevich	Unified Team	1:47.51	Q
7	2	Martin Steele	Great Britain	1:47.57	Q
8	2	José Arconada	Spain	1:47.60	Q
9	2	Václav Hrích	Czechoslovakia	1:47.71	
10	2	Andrea Benvenuti	Italy	1:48.52	
11	2	Leon Haan	Netherlands	1:48.71	
12	2	Mike Kemsies	Germany	1:48.93	
13	1	Andrew Lill	Great Britain	1:48.98	

=== Final ===
Rank	Name	Nationality	Time	Notes
1st place, gold medalist(s)	Luis Javier González	Spain	1:46.80	
2nd place, silver medalist(s)	José Arconada	Spain	1:47.16	PB
3rd place, bronze medalist(s)	Tonino Viali	Italy	1:47.22	
4	Martin Steele	Great Britain	1:47.23	
5	Anatoliy Makarevich	Unified Team	1:47.83	
6	Brian Whittle	Great Britain	1:56.13	
