= 1990 European Athletics Indoor Championships – Men's 800 metres =

The men's 800 metres event at the 1990 European Athletics Indoor Championships was held in Kelvin Hall on 3 and 4 March.

Tom McKean, who lived close to the event venue, won the 800m title in his home city of Glasgow, in front of a home crowd at Kelvin Hall. McKean arrived in Glasgow off the back of a disappointing result, having finished only seventh in the 800m final at the Commonwealth Games in Auckland a couple of months earlier.

== Medalists ==
Gold	Silver	Bronze
Tom McKean; Great Britain	Tomás de Teresa; Spain	Zbigniew Janus; Poland

== Results ==
=== Heats ===
First 3 from each heat (Q) and the next 3 fastest (q) qualified for the semifinals.

Rank	Heat	Name	Nationality	Time	Notes
1	1	Slobodan Popović	Yugoslavia	1:49.41	Q
2	1	Zbigniew Janus	Poland	1:49.75	Q
3	3	Martin Enholm	Sweden	1:49.94	Q
4	3	Giuseppe D'Urso	Italy	1:50.12	Q
5	3	Joachim Dehmel	West Germany	1:50.14	Q
6	3	Brian Whittle	Great Britain	1:50.14	q
7	3	Nicola Bonamici	Italy	1:50.54	q
8	3	Tomás de Teresa	Spain	1:51.89	q
9	2	Jussi Udelhoven	West Germany	1:52.09	Q
10	2	Tom McKean	Great Britain	1:52.41	Q
11	2	António Abrantes	Portugal	1:52.43	Q
12	2	Andrey Sudnik	Soviet Union	1:52.51	
13	2	Mark Eplinius	East Germany	1:52.79	
14	2	Luis Javier González	Spain	1:53.71	
15	1	José Arconada	Spain	1:53.78	Q
	1	David Sharpe	Great Britain	DNF	
	1	Esko Parpala	Finland	DNF	
	1	Simone Modugno	Italy	DQ	

=== Semifinals ===
First 2 from each semifinal (Q) and the next 2 fastest (q) qualified for the final.

Rank	Heat	Name	Nationality	Time	Notes
1	2	Zbigniew Janus	Poland	1:48.43	Q
2	2	Brian Whittle	Great Britain	1:48.43	Q
3	2	Tomás de Teresa	Spain	1:49.06	q
4	1	José Arconada	Spain	1:49.41	Q
5	2	Giuseppe D'Urso	Italy	1:49.45	q
6	1	Tom McKean	Great Britain	1:49.82	Q
7	1	Slobodan Popović	Yugoslavia	1:50.50	
8	2	António Abrantes	Portugal	1:52.29	
9	1	Joachim Dehmel	West Germany	1:52.86	
10	1	Nicola Bonamici	Italy	1:52.89	
11	2	Jussi Udelhoven	West Germany	1:55.43	
	1	Martin Enholm	Sweden	DQ	

=== Final ===
Rank	Name	Nationality	Time	Notes
1st place, gold medalist(s)	Tom McKean	Great Britain	1:46.22	
2nd place, silver medalist(s)	Tomás de Teresa	Spain	1:47.22	
3rd place, bronze medalist(s)	Zbigniew Janus	Poland	1:47.37	PB
4	José Arconada	Spain	1:47.40	
5	Giuseppe D'Urso	Italy	1:49.52	
	Brian Whittle	Great Britain	DNS	
