= Idrissou Tamimou =

Beninese middle-distance runner

Personal information
- Nationality: Beninese
- Born: 1961 (age 64–65)

Sport
- Sport: Middle-distance running
- Event: 800 metres

Idrissou Tamimou (born 1961) is a Beninese middle-distance runner. He competed in the men's 800 metres at the 1992 Summer Olympics.
