= Martin Steele =

British athlete

Personal information
- Nationality: British (English)
- Born: 30 September 1962 (age 63) Huddersfield, England

Sport
- Sport: Athletics
- Event: Middle-distance
- Club: Longwood Harriers

Martin Douglas Steele (born 30 September 1962) is a male English former middle-distance runner.

== Biography ==
Steele was a member of Longwood Harriers and was ranked No.1 in the world at the time of the 1993 World Championships in Athletics in Stuttgart. He had won the 800m race at the Bislett Games in Oslo in 1:43.84 min. In Stuttgart, however, Steele went out before the final.

Steele became a double British 800 metres champion after winning the British AAA Championships title at the 1993 AAA Championships and winning the UK Athletics Championships at Crystal Palace the same year.

He represented England in the 800 metres event, at the 1994 Commonwealth Games in Victoria, Canada.

== Competition record ==
Year	Competition	Venue	Position	Event	Notes
Representing Great Britain and England
1991	World Indoor Championships	Seville, Spain	5th (sf)	800 m	1:48.77
1992	European Indoor Championships	Genoa, Italy	4th	800 m	1:47.23
1993	World Indoor Championships	Toronto, Canada	15th (h)	800 m	1:50.71
1993	World Championships	Stuttgart, Germany	21st (sf)	800 m	1:46.70
1994	European Indoor Championships	Paris, France	10th (sf)	800 m	1:49.65
1994	Commonwealth Games	Victoria, British Columbia	7th	800 m	1:48.04
