= Andrey Sudnik =

Belarusian middle-distance runner

Andrey Sudnik (Belarusian: Андрэй Суднік; Russian: Андрей Судник; born 11 March 1967) is a retired Belarusian middle-distance runner who specialized in the 800 meters. He represented the Soviet Union at two indoor and two outdoor World Championships.

His personal bests in the event are 1:45.15 outdoors (Helsinki 1988) and 1:45.9 indoors (Moscow 1991).

Nowadays he works as a coach of the Belarusian national race walking team.

== Competition record ==
Year	Competition	Venue	Position	Event	Notes
Representing the Soviet Union
1985	European Junior Championships	Cottbus, East Germany	5th	800 m	1:52.41
1986	World Junior Championships	Athens, Greece	3rd	800 m	1:48.93
1987	World Championships	Rome, Italy	21st (qf)	800 m	1:46.48
1988	European Indoor Championships	Budapest, Hungary	7th (sf)	800 m	1:48.72
1989	World Indoor Championships	Budapest, Hungary	4th (sf)	800 m	1:49.01
1990	European Indoor Championships	Glasgow, United Kingdom	12th (h)	800 m	1:52.51
1990	Goodwill Games	Seattle, United States	5th	800 m	1:46.24
1990	European Championships	Helsinki, Finland	4th	800 m	1:45.81
1991	World Indoor Championships	Seville, Spain	9th (sf)	800 m	1:50.08
1991	World Championships	Tokyo, Japan	7th	800 m	1:46.36
