= Steve Heard =

English middle-distance runner

Personal information
- Nationality: British (English)
- Born: 29 April 1962 (age 64) Tunbridge Wells, Kent, England
- Height: 1.89 m (6 ft 2 in)
- Weight: 84 kg (185 lb)

Sport
- Sport: Athletics
- Event: middle-distance
- Club: Wolverhampton & Bilston AC
- Coached by: Trevor Rodwell

Steven Philip Heard (born 29 April 1962) is an English retired middle-distance runner

== Biography ==
Heard competed primarily in the 800 metres and represented Great Britain at the 1992 Olympics Games.

At the 1991 World Championships he reached the semifinals on both occasions. In addition, he won a gold medal at the 1989 European Indoor Championships.

Heard finished on the podium three times at the AAA Championships in 1988, 1991 and 1992.

== International competitions ==
Year	Competition	Venue	Position	Event	Notes
Representing Great Britain
1986	European Indoor Championships	Madrid, Spain	6th (sf)	400 m	47.81
1989	European Indoor Championships	The Hague, Netherlands	1st	800 m	1:48.84
1989	World Indoor Championships	Budapest, Hungary	10th (sf)	800 m	1:50.75
1991	World Championships	Tokyo, Japan	15th (sf)	800 m	1:49.91
1992	Olympic Games	Barcelona, Spain	9th (sf)	800 m	1:46.19

== Personal bests ==
Outdoor

- 400 metres – 45.74 (Antrim 1985)
- 600 metres – 1:14.95 (London 1991)
- 800 metres – 1:44.65 (Koblenz 1992)

Indoor

- 400 metres – 46.83 (Budapest 1987)
- 600 metres – 1:17.62 (Cosford 1987)
- 800 metres – 1:48.84 (Den Haag 1989)
