= Claude Diomar =

Guadeloupean-French runner

Claude Diomar (born 4 December 1961) is a retired Guadeloupean-French middle-distance runner who competed primarily in the 800 metres.

As a junior, he won the silver medal at the 1980 CARIFTA Games (U20). In 1989 he finished fourth at the European Indoor Championships and competed at the World Indoor Championships without reaching the final.

His personal best time was 1:46.65 minutes, achieved in August 1986 in Aix-les-Bains. With this time he won the French championships; he picked up his second title in 1988 and also became French indoor champion in 1989.
