= Joachim Dehmel =

German middle-distance runner

Personal information
- Born: 27 June 1969 (age 57) Stuttgart, West Germany
- Height: 1.90 m (6 ft 3 in)
- Weight: 72 kg (159 lb)

Sport
- Sport: Athletics
- Event: 800 m
- Club: SpVgg Feuerbach; LAC Quelle Fürth

Joachim Dehmel (born 27 June 1969) is a retired German middle-distance runner who specialized in the 800 meters. He represented his country at the 1996 Summer Olympics as well as one indoor and one outdoor World Championships.

Dehmel won his first national championship medal at the final West German championships in 1990, a silver medal in the 800 metres. He won the 1991 German championships, followed by a bronze in 1993 and silver in 1994 and 1995. He won the national indoor championships in 1990 and 1991 as well as an indoor bronze in 1995, 1996 and 1997. He represented the clubs SpVgg Feuerbach and LAC Quelle Fürth/München 1860.

== Competition record ==
Year	Competition	Venue	Position	Event	Notes
Representing West Germany
1988	World Junior Championships	Sudbury, Canada	7th	800 m	1:55.68
1990	European Indoor Championships	Glasgow, United Kingdom	9th (sf)	800 m	1:52.86
Representing Germany
1991	World Indoor Championships	Seville, Spain	5th	800 m	1:50.58
1991	World Championships	Tokyo, Japan	13th (sf)	800 m	1:47.91
1994	European Championships	Helsinki, Finland	25th (h)	800 m	1:49.36
1995	Universiade	Fukuoka, Japan	4th	800 m	1:48.29
1996	Olympic Games	Atlanta, United States	22nd (h)	800 m	1:47.12

== Personal bests ==
Outdoor

- 800 metres – 1:44.71 (Nurnberg 1996)

Indoor

- 800 metres – 1:46.35 (Stuttgart 1995)
- 1000 metres – 2:20.52 (Sindelfingen 1990)
- 1500 metres – 3:42.19 (Dortmund 1997)
