= Freddie Williams (runner) =

Canadian track and field athlete (born 1962)

Frederick Lawrence "Freddy" Williams (born February 24, 1962, in Cape Town, South Africa) is a Canadian track and field athlete, known for running middle distances. He represented Canada in the 1992 Olympics running the 800 metres and anchoring the Canadian 4 x 400 metres relay team. He also ran in the IAAF World Championships in Athletics, in both 1991 and as a 6th place finalist in 1993 beating the 1992 Olympic gold medalist William Tanui in the process.

He was a home town finalist in the 1993 IAAF World Indoor Championships in Toronto.

While running for Abilene Christian University, he was the 1986 NCAA Champion.
