= Billy Konchellah =

Kenyan distance runner

Personal information
- Full name: Billy Komintai Konchellah
- Born: 20 October 1961 (age 64) Kilgoris, Kenya
Medal record
Men's athletics
Representing Kenya
All-Africa Games
Gold medal – first place	1987 Nairobi	800 m
World Championships
Gold medal – first place	1987 Rome	800 m
Gold medal – first place	1991 Tokyo	800 m
Bronze medal – third place	1993 Stuttgart	800 m
African Championships
Gold medal – first place	1979 Dakar	4×400 m
Bronze medal – third place	1979 Dakar	400 m
Olympic Boycott Games
Gold medal – first place	1980 Philadelphia	400 m

Billy Komintai Konchellah (born 20 October 1961 in Kilgoris, Kenya) is a former 800 m runner who won two World Championship gold medals in Rome in 1987 and Tokyo in 1991.

== Career ==
His victory in the 1991 final was unexpected. He sprinted past Paul Ereng and Jose Luiz Barbosa on the final straight. In 1993 Konchellah made an unexpected comeback when he won the B-race at the meeting in Zurich. He travelled to the World Championships in Stuttgart and looked strong in the heats and semi-finals. However, in the final he lacked the finishing kick that had earned him the gold medal in Tokyo two years before. The race was won by Paul Ruto and Konchellah finished third. Konchellah never won an Olympic medal as he suffered from asthma for long periods of his career which prevented him from entering the 1988 and 1992 Olympic Games. In the 800 m final at the 1984 Summer Olympics he had finished fourth. Konchellah's World Championships record of 1:43.06 min (1987) lasted until 2019. He also won 800 metres race in the 1987 All-Africa Games held in Kenya.

In Sebastian Coe's world record of 1:41:73 in Florence, 1981, Konchellah set the early pace.

Konchellah continued his career until the late 90s.

His son Gregory Konchellah, who has changed his name to Yusuf Saad Kamel and is representing Bahrain since 2003, is also a prominent athlete. Billy's younger brother Patrick Konchellah is also a former successful 800 metres runner.

His father John Konchellah and uncle Gideon Konchellah were politicians. His brother John Konchellah has been involved with organising running competitions.

Billy Konchellah went to Jamhuri Primary and Upper Hill Secondary schools, both located in Nairobi. Later, he got an athletics scholarship in the United States and left there at age nineteen. He graduated with a degree in business administration from the University of New Mexico, Albuquerque.

After his running career, Konchellah moved to Oulu, Finland. He married a Finnish woman and had a child.

== Criminal charges and imprisonment ==
In 2004 he was acquitted of rape charges in the UK. He was deported from the UK and extradited to Finland to face charges that he drugged and raped two Finnish girls in 2002. One of the girls had been under 16, which is the age of consent in Finland. In 2005 he was convicted of two rapes, sexual exploitation of a child, and a drug crime and was sentenced to two and a half years in prison.

He was released from prison in 2006. Konchellah could face additional rape charges in Scotland, where two women have alleged that he raped them in 2003.
