= Athletics at the 1995 Summer Universiade – Men's 800 metres =

The men's 800 metres event at the 1995 Summer Universiade was held on 29–30 August at the Hakatanomori Athletic Stadium in Fukuoka, Japan.

== Medalists ==
Gold	Silver	Bronze
Hezekiél Sepeng; South Africa	Andrés Manuel Díaz; Spain	Pavel Soukup; Czech Republic

== Results ==
=== Heats ===
Qualification: First 2 of each heat (Q) and the next 2 fastest (q) qualified for the semifinals.

Rank	Heat	Athlete	Nationality	Time	Notes
1	2	Hezekiél Sepeng	South Africa	1:48.23	Q
2	2	Pavel Soukup	Czech Republic	1:48.37	Q
3	2	Farouk Amaouche	Algeria	1:48.41	q
4	2	Peter Philipp	Switzerland	1:49.26	q
6	4	Mario Watson	Jamaica	1:49.87	Q
7	4	Bryan Woodward	United States	1:49.97	Q
8	4	Boris Kaveshnikov	Kyrgyzstan	1:50.08	
9	7	Andrea Giocondi	Italy	1:50.79	Q
10	7	David Benefield	United States	1:50.81	Q
11	2	Takeshi Gobara	Japan	1:50.91	
12	7	Gilbert Tuhabonye	Burundi	1:50.99	
13	3	Kim Soon-hyung	South Korea	1:51.47	Q
14	4	Mark Harris	New Zealand	1:51.94	
15	2	Suliman Abdalla	Sudan	1:52.20	
16	7	Javier Soto	Puerto Rico	1:52.25	
17	7	Mehmet Çakir	Turkey	1:52.42	
18	3	Jurgens Kotze	South Africa	1:52.57	Q
19	6	Tomonari Ono	Japan	1:52.61	Q
20	1	António Abrantes	Portugal	1:52.71	Q
21	1	Byron Goodwin	Canada	1:52.82	Q
22	3	Malekshir Moradi Fard	Iran	1:52.87	
23	1	Charles Baryamujura	Uganda	1:52.92	
24	6	Andrés Manuel Díaz	Spain	1:53.01	Q
25	5	Balázs Korányi	Hungary	1:53.11	Q
26	5	Joachim Dehmel	Germany	1:53.20	Q
27	5	William Best	Canada	1:53.43	
28	5	Gilbert Mvuyekure	Uganda	1:53.54	
29	4	Engelhardt Uiseb	Namibia	1:53.64	
30	4	Manuel Balmaceda	Chile	1:54.07	
31	1	Cedric Harris	Dominica	1:54.18	
32	5	Ling Seow Kang	Singapore	1:54.97	
33	3	Alexander Grech	Malta	1:55.32	
34	6	Bendaoud Faissoil	Comoros	1:55.98	
35	2	Saravana Arjunan	Singapore	1:56.32	
36	1	U Aye Lwin	Myanmar	1:56.64	
37	3	Lei Vai Kun	Macau	1:57.83	
38	5	Wong Kin On	Hong Kong	1:57.98	
39	3	Naseer Ismail	Maldives	1:58.32	
40	5	Essoham Assima-Kpatcha	Togo	1:59.92	
41	3	Kalua McDonald	Malawi	2:00.64	
42	7	Halahapperumage Fonseka	Sri Lanka	2:03.58	
43	4	Erick Moga	Solomon Islands	2:03.92	
44	1	Emanuel Andrade	Cape Verde	2:06.31	
45	1	Gordon Kapak	Papua New Guinea	2:11.78	
	3	Arturo Espejel	Mexico	DNF	
	6	Christos Mayroidis	Greece	DNF	
	7	Sylvester Simelane	Swaziland	DQ	
	1	Einārs Tupurītis	Latvia	DNS	
	6	Arumugam Palaniappan	Malaysia	DNS	
	6	Balázs Tölgyesi	Hungary	DNS	

=== Semifinals ===
Qualification: First 4 of each semifinal qualified directly (Q) for the final.

Rank	Heat	Athlete	Nationality	Time	Notes
1	1	Joachim Dehmel	Germany	1:47.82	Q
2	1	Andrea Giocondi	Italy	1:48.13	Q
3	1	Farouk Amaouche	Algeria	1:48.13	Q
4	1	David Benefield	United States	1:48.16	Q
5	1	António Abrantes	Portugal	1:48.19	
6	1	Mario Watson	Jamaica	1:48.23	
7	2	Andrés Manuel Díaz	Spain	1:48.86	Q
8	2	Hezekiél Sepeng	South Africa	1:49.25	Q
9	1	Jurgens Kotze	South Africa	1:49.35	
10	2	Pavel Soukup	Czech Republic	1:49.41	Q
11	2	Kim Soon-hyung	South Korea	1:49.56	Q
12	2	Tomonari Ono	Japan	1:50.31	
13	2	Peter Philipp	Switzerland	1:50.94	
14	2	Bryan Woodward	United States	1:51.79	
15	1	Balázs Korányi	Hungary	1:52.45	
16	2	Byron Goodwin	Canada	1:53.09	

=== Final ===
Rank	Athlete	Nationality	Time	Notes
1st place, gold medalist(s)	Hezekiél Sepeng	South Africa	1:47.87	
2nd place, silver medalist(s)	Andrés Manuel Díaz	Spain	1:48.06	
3rd place, bronze medalist(s)	Pavel Soukup	Czech Republic	1:48.15	
4	Joachim Dehmel	Germany	1:48.29	
5	Andrea Giocondi	Italy	1:48.31	
6	Kim Soon-hyung	South Korea	1:48.90	
7	David Benefield	United States	1:49.16	
8	Farouk Amaouche	Algeria	1:49.41	
