= 1990 European Athletics Championships – Men's 800 metres =

Men's 800 metres at the European Athletics Championships

These are the official results of the Men's 800 metres event at the 1990 European Championships in Split, Yugoslavia, held at Stadion Poljud on 27, 28, and 29 August 1990.

== Medalists ==
Gold	Tom McKean; United Kingdom
Silver	David Sharpe; United Kingdom
Bronze	Piotr Piekarski; Poland

== Results ==
=== Final ===
29 August

Rank	Name	Nationality	Time	Notes
1st place, gold medalist(s)	Tom McKean	United Kingdom	1:44.76	
2nd place, silver medalist(s)	David Sharpe	United Kingdom	1:45.59	
3rd place, bronze medalist(s)	Piotr Piekarski	Poland	1:45.76	
4	Andrey Sudnik	Soviet Union	1:45.81	
5	Slobodan Popović	Yugoslavia	1:45.90	
6	Tonino Viali	Italy	1:46.04	
7	Giuseppe D'Urso	Italy	1:47.29	
8	Matthew Yates	United Kingdom	1:48.42	

=== Semi-finals ===
28 August

==== Semi-final 1 ====
Rank	Name	Nationality	Time	Notes
1	Tonino Viali	Italy	1:45.64	Q
2	Slobodan Popović	Yugoslavia	1:45.79	Q
3	David Sharpe	United Kingdom	1:45.82	Q
4	Andrey Sudnik	Soviet Union	1:45.89	q
5	Matthew Yates	United Kingdom	1:46.61	q
6	Atle Douglas	Norway	1:47.04	
7	Ryszard Ostrowski	Poland	1:48.22	
8	Luis Javier González	Spain	1:50.79	

==== Semi-final 2 ====
Rank	Name	Nationality	Time	Notes
1	Piotr Piekarski	Poland	1:47.45	Q
2	Tom McKean	United Kingdom	1:47.49	Q
3	Giuseppe D'Urso	Italy	1:47.77	Q
4	Slobodan Miolović	Yugoslavia	1:47.94	
5	Alberto Barsotti	Italy	1:48.13	
6	Robin van Helden	Netherlands	1:48.26	
7	Tomás De Teresa	Spain	1:48.73	
8	Frédéric Selle	France	1:49.98	

=== Heats ===
27 August

==== Heat 1 ====
Rank	Name	Nationality	Time	Notes
1	Andrey Sudnik	Soviet Union	1:49.71	Q
2	Tom McKean	United Kingdom	1:49.87	Q
3	Giuseppe D'Urso	Italy	1:49.91	Q
4	Frédéric Selle	France	1:49.94	Q
5	Ryszard Ostrowski	Poland	1:50.05	q
6	Ari Suhonen	Finland	1:50.25	
7	Markus Trinkler	Switzerland	1:50.32	

==== Heat 2 ====
Rank	Name	Nationality	Time	Notes
1	Tonino Viali	Italy	1:46.94	Q
2	Slobodan Miolović	Yugoslavia	1:47.14	Q
3	Matthew Yates	United Kingdom	1:47.43	Q
4	Atle Douglas	Norway	1:47.52	Q
5	Tomás De Teresa	Spain	1:47.83	q
6	Miroslav Chochkov	Bulgaria	1:50.68	

==== Heat 3 ====
Rank	Name	Nationality	Time	Notes
1	Piotr Piekarski	Poland	1:48.08	Q
2	David Sharpe	United Kingdom	1:48.30	Q
3	Robin van Helden	Netherlands	1:48.40	Q
4	Luis Javier González	Spain	1:48.42	Q
5	Slobodan Popović	Yugoslavia	1:48.43	q
6	Alberto Barsotti	Italy	1:49.22	q
7	Jose Arconada	Spain	1:50.24	

== Participation ==
According to an unofficial count, 20 athletes from 12 countries participated in the event.

- Bulgaria (1)
- Finland (1)
- France (1)
- Italy (3)
- Netherlands (1)
- Norway (1)
- Poland (2)
- Soviet Union (1)
- Spain (3)
- Switzerland (1)
- United Kingdom (3)
- Yugoslavia (2)

== See also ==
- 1988 Men's Olympic 800 metres (Seoul)
- 1991 Men's World Championships 800 metres (Tokyo)
- 1992 Men's Olympic 800 metres (Barcelona)
