= José Luíz Barbosa =

Brazilian middle-distance runner

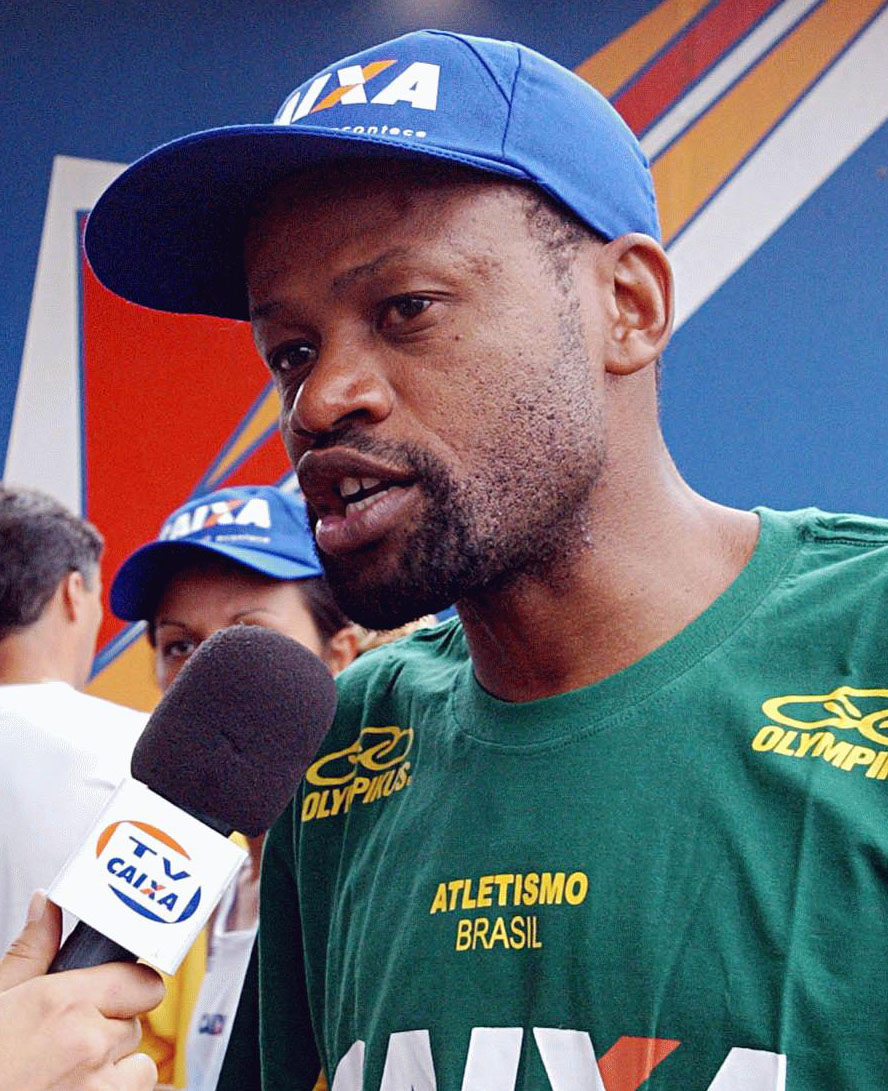

Personal information
- Born: May 27, 1961 (age 65) Três Lagoas, Brazil
- Height: 1.84 m (6 ft 0 in)
- Weight: 68 kg (150 lb)

Sport
- Country: Brazil
- Sport: Men's athletics
Medal record
World Championships
Silver medal – second place	1991 Tokyo	800 m
Bronze medal – third place	1987 Rome	800 m
World Indoor Championships
Gold medal – first place	1987 Indianapolis	800 m
Silver medal – second place	1989 Budapest	800 m
Pan American Games
Gold medal – first place	1995 Mar del Plata	800 m
Silver medal – second place	1983 Caracas	800 m
Silver medal – second place	1983 Caracas	4 × 400 m

José Luíz Barbosa, known as Zequinha Barbosa (born May 27, 1961) is a Brazilian former middle-distance runner who specialized in the 800 metres. José participated in 4 Olympic Games: 1984 Los Angeles; 1988 Soul Korea; 1992 Barcelona and 1996 Atlanta. He is the 1987 World Indoor Champion, and a two-time World Championship medallist, winning silver in 1991 and bronze in 1987. 1995 Pan American gold medalist 800 m 1987 Silver medalist, 1983 Silver medalist 800 m and Silver 4 × 400 m. Jose was ranked number one in the world in the 800 m in 1991.

== Career ==
Born in Três Lagoas, Mato Grosso do Sul, Barbosa won the British AAA Championships title in the 800 metres event at the 1985 AAA Championships.

Barbosa won the silver medal at the 1991 World Championships in Tokyo. A few weeks before, Barbosa had won the 800 m race at the prestigious Letzigrund meeting in Zürich. He travelled to Tokyo as the favourite but lost to Billy Konchellah from Kenya, who overtook him on the home straight.

Shortly after the championships, Barbosa ran the fastest time of the year in Rieti, where he clocked 1 minute 43.08 secs. This remained his personal best throughout the remainder of his career. A year later he placed fourth in the Olympic final.

Earlier in his career, Barbosa had won a bronze medal at the 1987 World Championships in Athletics in Rome, and finished sixth in the 800 m final at the 1988 Summer Olympics in Seoul.

Barbosa celebrated his greatest indoor success at the 1987 IAAF World Indoor Championships in Indianapolis, where he won gold over 800 m. At the 1993 IAAF World Indoor Championships in Toronto he entered the 800 m final as a favourite but dropped out after colliding with Nico Motchebon.

Barbosa was head Cross Country and Track and Field Coach at Granite Hills High School in El Cajon for 5 1/2 years.

Barbosa was also the Men's Cross Country and Track and Field coach for Mesa College in San Diego.

On December 1, 2021, he was named the Cross Country and track assistant coach at Bellevue University Nebraska.

== Competition record ==
Year	Competition	Venue	Position	Event	Notes
Representing Brazil
1981	South American Championships	La Paz, Bolivia	2nd	800 m	1:54.7
1981	South American Championships	La Paz, Bolivia	1st	4 × 400 m relay	3:09.5
1983	World Championships	Helsinki, Finland	19th (sf)	800 m	1:48.05
1983	World Championships	Helsinki, Finland	6th (sf)	4 × 400 m relay	3:04.46
1983	Pan American Games	Caracas, Venezuela	2nd	800 m	1:46.65
1983	Pan American Games	Caracas, Venezuela	2nd	4 × 400 m relay	3:02.79
1983	Ibero-American Championships	Barcelona, Spain	3rd	800 m	1:50.02
1983	Ibero-American Championships	Barcelona, Spain	3rd	4 × 100 m relay	41.00
1983	Ibero-American Championships	Barcelona, Spain	2nd	4 × 400 m relay	3:07.62
1983	South American Championships	Santa Fe, Argentina	1st	800 m	1:49.1
1983	South American Championships	Santa Fe, Argentina	1st	4 × 400 m relay	3.10.8
1984	Olympic Games	Los Angeles, United States	15th (sf)	800 m	1:48.70
1984	Olympic Games	Los Angeles, United States	7th (sf)	4 × 400 m relay	3:03:99
1987	World Indoor Championships	Indianapolis, United States	1st	800 m	1:47.49
1987	Pan American Games	Indianapolis, United States	2nd	800 m	1:47.37
1987	World Championships	Rome, Italy	3rd	800 m	1:43.76
1987	World Championships	Rome, Italy	19th (h)	4 × 400 m relay	3:05.64
1988	Olympic Games	Seoul, South Korea	6th	800 m	1:46.39
1988	Olympic Games	Seoul, South Korea	33rd (h)	1500 m	3:44.46
1989	World Indoor Championships	Budapest, Hungary	2nd	800 m	1:45.55
1990	Goodwill Games	Seattle, United States	3rd	800 m	1:45.81
1990	Ibero-American Championships	Manaus, Brazil	1st	800 m	1:46.18
1991	World Championships	Tokyo, Japan	2nd	800 m	1:44.24
1992	Olympic Games	Barcelona, Spain	4th	800 m	1:45.06
1992	World Cup	Havana, Cuba	4th	800 m	1:47.66
1993	World Indoor Championships	Toronto, Canada	6th (sf)	800 m	1:48.56
1993	World Championships	Stuttgart, Germany	15th (sf)	800 m	1:45.92
1994	Goodwill Games	Saint Petersburg, Russia	6th	800 m	1:47.49
1994	World Cup	London, United Kingdom	7th	800 m	1:48.26
1995	Pan American Games	Mar del Plata, Argentina	1st	800 m	1:46.02
1995	Pan American Games	Mar del Plata, Argentina	4th	4 × 400 m relay	3:07.54
1995	South American Championships	Manaus, Brazil	1st	800 m	1:46.16
1995	World Championships	Gothenburg, Sweden	15th (h)	800 m	1:47.10
1996	Ibero-American Championships	Medellín, Colombia	2nd (h)	800 m	1:49.93
1996	Olympic Games	Atlanta, United States	23rd (sf)	800 m	1:50.33
1997	World Championships	Athens, Greece	25th (qf)	800 m	1:47.30

== Personal bests ==
Outdoor

- 400 metres – 45.9h (Sǎo Paulo 1983)
- 800 metres – 1:43.08 (Rieti 1991)
- 1000 metres – 2:17.36 (Nice 1985)
- 1500 metres – 3:37.04 (Grosseto 1991)

Indoor

- 600 metres – 1:16.82 (Karlsruhe 1986)
- 800 metres – 1:45.43 (Piraeus 1989)
- 1000 metres – 2:20.77 (Madrid 1989)
