= Luis Javier González =

Spanish middle-distance runner

Luis Javier González Fanegas (born 17 June 1969 in Madrid) is a retired Spanish middle-distance runner. He specialized in the 800 metres.

== Achievements ==
Year	Competition	Venue	Position	Event	Notes
Representing Spain
1988	World Junior Championships	Sudbury, Canada	13th (sf)	800m	1:51.98
1990	European Indoor Championships	Glasgow, United Kingdom	14th (h)	800 m	1:53.71
1990	European Championships	Split, Yugoslavia	16th	800 m	1:50.79
1990	Ibero-American Championships	Manaus, Brazil	3rd	800 m	1:47.66
1991	World Indoor Championships	Seville, Spain	22nd (h)	800 m	1:51.47
1991	Mediterranean Games	Athens, Greece	2nd	800 m	1:47.62
1991	World Championships	Tokyo, Japan	32nd (h)	800 m	1:50.46
1992	European Indoor Championships	Genoa, Italy	1st	800 m	1:46.80
1992	Ibero-American Championships	Seville, Spain	1st (h)	800m	1:51.89
1992	Olympic Games	Barcelona, Spain	17th (sf)	800 m	1:47.09
1993	World Championships	Stuttgart, Germany	22nd (sf)	800 m	1:47.29
1994	European Indoor Championships	Paris, France	2nd	800 m	1:46.69
1996	European Indoor Championships	Stockholm, Sweden	13th (h)	800 m	1:51.83
1998	European Indoor Championships	Valencia, Spain	14th (h)	800 m	1:50.59
