= 1989 European Athletics Indoor Championships – Men's 800 metres =

The men's 800 metres event at the 1989 European Athletics Indoor Championships was held on 18 and 19 February.

== Medalists ==
Gold	Silver	Bronze
Steve Heard; Great Britain	Rob Druppers; Netherlands	Joachim Heydgen; West Germany

== Results ==
=== Heats ===
First 2 from each heat (Q) and the next 6 fastest (q) qualified for the semifinals.

Rank	Heat	Name	Nationality	Time	Notes
1	3	Markus Trinkler	Switzerland	1:50.87	Q
2	3	Tomás De Teresa	Spain	1:50.91	Q
3	3	Steve Heard	Great Britain	1:50.96	q
4	3	Denis Badie	France	1:50.97	q
5	1	Rob Druppers	Netherlands	1:51.05	Q
6	1	Claude Diomar	France	1:51.16	Q
7	1	José Arconada	Spain	1:51.17	q
8	1	Petr Mareš	Czechoslovakia	1:51.19	q
9	2	Alfredo Lahuerta	Spain	1:51.54	Q
10	2	Joachim Heydgen	West Germany	1:51.58	Q
11	1	Álvaro Silva	Portugal	1:51.63	q
12	2	David Sharpe	Great Britain	1:51.66	q
13	2	Tonny Baltus	Netherlands	1:51.98	
14	3	Tony Ernst	Belgium	1:52.12	
15	1	Atle Karlsen	Norway	1:52.13	

=== Semifinals ===
First 3 from each semifinal qualified directly (Q) for the final.

Rank	Heat	Name	Nationality	Time	Notes
1	2	Joachim Heydgen	West Germany	1:50.01	Q
2	2	Claude Diomar	France	1:50.08	Q
3	2	Steve Heard	Great Britain	1:50.09	Q
4	2	José Arconada	Spain	1:50.25	
5	1	Rob Druppers	Netherlands	1:50.73	Q
6	1	David Sharpe	Great Britain	1:51.06	Q
7	2	Álvaro Silva	Portugal	1:51.17	
8	1	Alfredo Lahuerta	Spain	1:51.22	Q
9	1	Denis Badie	France	1:51.32	
10	1	Markus Trinkler	Switzerland	1:51.70	
11	1	Petr Mareš	Czechoslovakia	1:51.72	
12	2	Tomás De Teresa	Spain	1:52.54	

=== Final ===
Rank	Name	Nationality	Time	Notes
1st place, gold medalist(s)	Steve Heard	Great Britain	1:48.84	PB
2nd place, silver medalist(s)	Rob Druppers	Netherlands	1:48.96	
3rd place, bronze medalist(s)	Joachim Heydgen	West Germany	1:49.75	
4	Claude Diomar	France	1:52.37	
	Alfredo Lahuerta	Spain	DNF	
	David Sharpe	Great Britain	DNF	
