= António Abrantes =

Portuguese middle-distance runner

Personal information
- Born: 15 May 1968 (age 58) Lisbon, Portugal
- Height: 1.76 m (5 ft 9 in)
- Weight: 68 kg (150 lb)

Sport
- Sport: Middle-distance running
- Event: 800 metres
- Club: Benfica Lisbon
Medal record
Representing Portugal
European Junior Championships
Silver medal – second place	1987 Birmingham	800m

António da Cunha Meneses Martins Abrantes (born 15 May 1968) is a retired Portuguese middle-distance runner who specialised in the 800 metres. He represented his country at three consecutive Summer Olympics, starting in 1988, as well as two outdoor and one indoor World Championships.

His personal bests in the event are 1:46.23 outdoors (Maia 1995) and 1:50.94 indoors (Barcelona 1995).

== Competition record ==
Year	Competition	Venue	Position	Event	Notes
Representing Portugal
1986	World Junior Championships	Athens, Greece	24th (sf)	400 m	48.33
1987	Universiade	Zagreb, Yugoslavia	15th (sf)	400 m	47.53
1987	European Junior Championships	Birmingham, United Kingdom	2nd	800 m	1:49.74
1988	Olympic Games	Seoul, South Korea	35th (h)	800 m	1:49.01
1988	Olympic Games	Seoul, South Korea	14th (sf)	4 × 400 m relay	3:07.75
1989	Universiade	Duisburg, West Germany	16th (sf)	800 m	1:50.96
1990	European Indoor Championships	Glasgow, United Kingdom	8th (sf)	800 m	1:52.29
1990	Ibero-American Championships	Manaus, Brazil	5th	800m	1:48.30
1991	World Championships	Tokyo, Japan	24th (h)	800 m	1:47.91
1992	European Indoor Championships	Genoa, Italy	20th (h)	800 m	1:51.36
1992	Olympic Games	Barcelona, Spain	40th (h)	800 m	1:50.89
1993	Universiade	Buffalo, United States	3rd (h)	800 m	1:50.74
1994	European Championships	Helsinki, Finland	11th (h)	800 m	1:47.61
1995	World Indoor Championships	Barcelona, Spain	13th (h)	800 m	1:50.94
1995	World Championships	Gothenburg, Sweden	23rd (h)	800 m	1:48.10
1995	Universiade	Fukuoka, Japan	5th (sf)	800 m	1:48.19
1995	Universiade	Fukuoka, Japan	7th	4 × 400 m relay	3:05.48
1996	Olympic Games	Atlanta, United States	33rd (h)	800 m	1:47.73
