= Piotr Piekarski (runner) =

Polish middle-distance runner

Medal record

Men's athletics

Representing Poland

European Championships
Bronze medal – third place	1990 Split	800 m

Piotr Piekarski (born 10 April 1964 in Brusy) is a retired Polish middle-distance runner who specialized in the 800 metres.

== International competitions ==
Year	Competition	Venue	Position	Event	Notes
Representing Poland
1983	European Junior Championships	Schwechat, Austria	2nd	800 m	1:47.70
1984	European Indoor Championships	Gothenburg, Sweden	6th	800 m	1:51.98
1990	European Championships	Split, Yugoslavia	3rd	800 m	1:45.76
1991	World Championships	Tokyo, Japan	5th	800 m	1:45.44
1992	Olympic Games	Barcelona, Spain	26th (h)	800 m	1:48.51^{1}
1994	European Championships	Helsinki, Finland	19th (h)	800 m	1:48.50

^{1}Disqualified in the semifinals
