= Anwar Mohamed (athlete) =

Yemeni middle-distance runner

Personal information
- Full name: Anwar Omar Mohamed Ali
- Born: 6 December 1976 (age 49)
- Height: 1.84 m (6 ft 0 in)
- Weight: 55 kg (121 lb)

Sport
- Country: Yemen
- Sport: Athletics

Anwar Omar Mohamed Ali (Arabic: انور عمر محمد علي, born 6 December 1976) is a Yemeni middle-distance runner who competed internationally for Yemen at the 1992 Summer Olympics.

== Career ==
At just 15 years old, Mohamed competed in the 800 metres at the 1992 Summer Olympics held in Barcelona, Spain, he ran in the final heat in round one, where he finished seventh ahead of Francis Munthali from Malawi, but still not fast enough to qualify for the next round. Three years later he competed at the 1995 World Championships in Athletics in Gothenburg, Sweden, he entered the 800 metres, he came last in his heat, so didn't qualify to the next round.
