= Gideon Konchellah =

Kenyan politician (died 2026)

Member of the National Assembly of Kenya
- In office 2003–2022

Minister for Immigration and Registration of Persons of Kenya
- In office 2006–2007
- President: Mwai Kibaki

Personal details
- Died: 13 June 2026
- Party: PNU; URP; Jubilee

Gideon Konchellah (died 13 June 2026) was a Kenyan politician. A member of the Party of National Unity, the United Republican Party and the Jubilee Party, he served in the National Assembly of Kenya from 2003 to 2022 and as minister for immigration and registration of persons of Kenya from 2006 to 2007.

Konchellah died from a cardiac arrest on 13 June 2026.
