= Tomás de Teresa =

Spanish middle-distance runner

Personal information
- Born: 5 September 1968 Santoña, Cantabria, Spain
- Height: 1.83 m (6 ft 0 in)
- Weight: 69–73 kg (152–161 lb)

Sport
- Sport: Athletics
- Event: 800 metres
Medal record
Men's athletics
Representing Spain
European Championships
Bronze medal – third place	1994 Helsinki	800 m

Tomás de Teresa Colina (born 5 September 1968 in Santoña, Cantabria) is a former Spanish middle-distance runner who participated in the 1991 World Championships final in Tokyo over 800 m. He won a silver medal at the World Indoor Championships the same year, as well as a bronze medal at the 1994 European Championships.

== International competitions ==
Year	Competition	Venue	Position	Event	Notes
Representing Spain
1987	European Junior Championships	Birmingham, United Kingdom	1st	800 m	1:49.37
1988	European Indoor Championships	Budapest, Hungary	16th (h)	800 m	2:00.65
1988	Olympic Games	Seoul, South Korea	26th (qf)	800 m	1:48.01
1989	European Indoor Championships	The Hague, Netherlands	12th (sf)	800 m	1:52.54
1989	World Indoor Championships	Budapest, Hungary	16th (sf)	800 m	1:50.19
1989	World Cup	Barcelona, Spain	8th	800 m	1:47.94
1990	European Indoor Championships	Glasgow, United Kingdom	2nd	800 m	1:47.22
1990	European Championships	Split, Yugoslavia	14th (sf)	800 m	1:48.73
1991	World Indoor Championships	Seville, Spain	2nd	800 m	1:47.82
1991	World Championships	Tokyo, Japan	8th	800 m	1:47.65
1992	Olympic Games	Barcelona, Spain	7th (sf)	800 m	1:46.08
1993	World Championships	Stuttgart, Germany	22nd (h)	800 m	1:49.79
1994	European Championships	Helsinki, Finland	3rd	800 m	1:46.57
1994	World Cup	London, United Kingdom	6th	800 m	1:48.04^{1}
1995	World Championships	Gothenburg, Sweden	34th (h)	800 m	1:49.07

^{1}Representing Europe

== Personal bests ==
Outdoor

- 800 metres – 1:44.99 (Seville 1990)
- 1000 metres – 2:19.99 (Madrid 1994)

Indoor

- 800 metres – 1:46.97 (Seville 1989)
- 1000 metres – 2:27.49 (Madrid 1997)
