= Lee Jin-il =

South Korean middle-distance runner

Medal record

Men's athletics

Representing South Korea

Asian Championships
Gold medal – first place	1991 Kuala Lumpur	800 m
Gold medal – first place	1993 Manila	800 m

East Asian Games
Gold medal – first place	1993 Shanghai	800 m

Lee Jin-Il (born January 12, 1973 in Daegu) is a retired South Korean athlete who competed in the 800 metres. His personal best time is 1.44.14 in 800 metres, achieved on June 17, 1994, in the South Korean Athletics Championships. This is the current South Korean record. It was also the Asian record until it was broken by Yusuf Saad Kamel in 2004.

Lee took part in the 1992 IAAF World Cup and came in fifth place. He won the gold medal in the 800 m at the 1993 East Asian Games and went on to win consecutive gold medals at the Asian Games. He represented South Korea on the global stage three times: first at the 1992 Barcelona Olympics where he finished third in his 800 m heat, then he competed at the 1993 IAAF World Indoor Championships where he was sixth in the semi-finals, and finally he took part in the 1993 World Championships in Athletics later that year. In 1995 he was suspended for two years after a doping violation.

== Achievements ==
- 1998 Asian Games - gold medal
- 1994 Asian Games - gold medal (Games record)
- 1993 Asian Championships - gold medal
- 1992 World Junior Championships - silver medal
- 1991 Asian Championships - gold medal
