= Ismail Mohamed Youssef =

Qatari middle-distance runner

Personal information
- Nationality: Qatari
- Born: 10 August 1967 (age 58)

Sport
- Sport: Middle-distance running
- Event: 800 metres
Medal record
Men's athletics
Representing Qatar
Asian Championships
Gold medal – first place	1987 Singapore	800 m
Bronze medal – third place	1991 Kuala Lumpur	800 m

Ismail Mohamed Youssef (Arabic: إسماعيل محمد يوسف, born 10 August 1967) is a Qatari middle-distance runner. He competed in the 800 metres at the 1988 Summer Olympics and the 1992 Summer Olympics.
