= Anatoly Makarevich =

Belarusian middle-distance runner

Personal information
- Full name: Anatoly Vasilyevich Makarevich
- Nationality: Belarusian
- Born: 19 May 1970 (age 56) Krupki, Soviet Union

Sport
- Sport: Middle-distance running
- Event: 800 metres

Anatoly Vasilyevich Makarevich (born 19 May 1970) is a Belarusian middle-distance runner. He competed in the men's 800 metres at the 1992 Summer Olympics, representing the Unified Team.
