= Peter O'Donoghue (athlete) =

New Zealand and Australian athlete

Personal information
- Full name: Peter Gerard O'Donoghue
- Born: 1 October 1961 (age 64)

Sport
- Country: New Zealand; Australia
- Sport: Track and field
- Events: 800 m; 1500 m; 5000 m

Achievements and titles
- National finals: New Zealand 1500 m champion (1984, 1987, 1990); Australian 5000 m champion (1993)
Medal record
Men's athletics
Representing New Zealand
Commonwealth Games
Bronze medal – third place	1990 Auckland	1500m

Peter Gerard O'Donoghue (born 1 October 1961) is a former New Zealand and Australian athlete specialising in middle distance running.

== Biography ==
O'Donoghue was selected for the 1982 Commonwealth Games, but withdrew due to injury. At the 1984 Summer Olympics he ran in the 1500m, coming 8th in his semifinal with a time of 3:38.71. Earlier in 1984 he beat Steve Ovett on the line in a 1500m race in Melbourne. He competed for New Zealand in the 1990 Commonwealth Games, winning a bronze in the 1500m with 3:35.14, and that year was awarded the New Zealand 1990 Commemoration Medal. His personal best time for 1500m was 3:34.9. After transferring his allegiance to Australia, he ran an Australian Resident Record over 5000m of 13:23.6, with the last 800m covered in 1:56.0, but withdrew from the 1994 Commonwealth Games due to injury.

He finished second behind Kenyan Joseph Keter in the 3,000 metres event at the British 1993 AAA Championships.
