= Patrick Konchellah =

Patrick Konchellah (April 20, 1968 – November 29, 2009 in Bomet) was a Kenyan middle-distance runner.

He finished fourth in the 800 metres final at the 1997 World Championships in Athletics in Athens, a race won by Wilson Kipketer. He also helped set the pace of the former world record in the 800M set by Kenyan-born Dane, Wilson Kipketer (1.41.11) on 24 August 1997 in Cologne, Germany. Konchellah also won gold medal at the 1994 Commonwealth Games. He won Kenyan trials for the 2000 Olympics, but was ailing and missed the Olympics.

Konchellah's personal best time was 1:42.98 minutes.

He died on November 28, 2009, at the Tenwek Mission Hospital in Bomet due to cancer .

His older brother Billy Konchellah is a world champion 800 metres runner. His son Felix Konchellah is also a runner, who was selected to represent Kenya at the 2008 World Junior Championships.
