= Kennedy Osei =

Ghanaian middle-distance runner

Kennedy Osei (born 21 October 1966) is a retired Ghanaian middle-distance runner who specialized in the 800 metres.

He won the bronze medal at the 1991 All-Africa Games. He also competed at the World Championships in 1993 and 1997 as well as the World Indoor Championships in 1993 and 1997, reaching the semifinals on each occasion.

== Personal bests ==
- 800 metres - 1:45.13 min (1994) - national record.
- 1500 metres - 3:47.10 min (1993) - national record is 3:46.62 min.

Olympic Games
Preceded by Moro Tijani	Flagbearer for Ghana; 2000 Sydney	Succeeded by Andrew Owusu
