= Johnny Gray =

American middle-distance runner

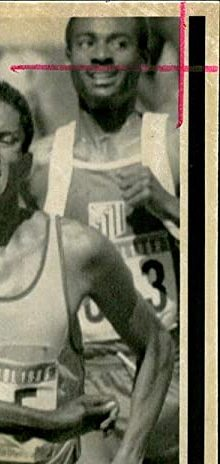
- Gray finishing 5th in the 800m at the 1988 Olympics

Personal information
- Full name: John Lee Gray Jr.
- Born: June 19, 1960 (age 66) Los Angeles, California, U.S.
- Height: 1.91 m (6 ft 3 in)
- Weight: 75 kg (165 lb)

Sport
- Sport: Track
- Event: 800 meters
- College team: Santa Monica College; Arizona State University

Achievements and titles
- Personal bests: 600 metres: 1:12.81 WB; 800 metres: 1:42.60; 1000 metres: 2:17.27
Medal record
Men's athletics
Representing the United States
Olympic Games
Bronze medal – third place	1992 Barcelona	800 metres
Pan American Games
Gold medal – first place	1987 Indianapolis	800 metres
Gold medal – first place	1999 Winnipeg	800 metres

John Lee Gray Jr. (born June 19, 1960) is a retired American world-class 800 meter runner from the mid-1980s to the late 1990s and the holder of the 600m world best. A four-time Olympian (1984-1996), in 1985 he set the US record of 1:42.60 at a meet in Koblenz. That time puts Gray as the nineteenth fastest performer of all time. He came seventh in the 1984 Summer Olympics, fifth in 1988, and won the bronze medal at the Barcelona Olympics of 1992. In 1993 Gray was one of the favourites to win a gold medal at the World Championships in Stuttgart as he had won the A-race at the prestigious meeting in Zurich. However, he failed to qualify for the final in Stuttgart. He also set the world 600 meter record in 1986 at 1:12.81. In 1992 and 1993 Gray came close to breaking the world indoor record over 800 m several times. He held the US indoor record at 1:45.00 (Sindelfingen 1992) till February 2019.

== Running career ==
Gray went to Crenshaw High School, Santa Monica College, Arizona State University and received his graduate degree from California State University, Los Angeles. He ran his "professional" career for the Santa Monica Track Club, coached by Merle McGee. When he qualified for the 1996 Olympics by winning the 1996 Olympic Trials on his 36th birthday, he became the oldest male American track athlete to qualify for the Olympics. Other older athletes who qualified were throwers, race walkers, marathoners and pole vaulter Jeff Hartwig. Joetta Clark holds the same honor for women.

Having led the Olympic 800 m race at the 1992 Summer Olympics with a blazing first lap at better than world record pace, Gray was passed twice during the final lap to claim the bronze medal. A reporter later asked him what he would have done differently if he could run the race a second time, and it is rumored that he responded, "I would have taken it out harder." Runners refer to such an attitude as "taking it to the Gray zone" in his honor. This tactic also resulted in some devastating failures as in the 1987 and 1993 World Championships when he jogged to the finish of quarterfinal races, depleted and defeated. He walked to the finish of the 1980 Olympic Trials.

He was inducted into the United States National Track and Field Hall of Fame December 2008. Also member of Santa Monica College Hall of Fame, Millrose Games in NYC Hall of Fame, Mt. SAC Relays Hall of Fame, and obtained the key to the city for Santa Monica, Inglewood, Walnut, Agoura Hills and New York.

=== Masters career ===
Gray attempted to extend his career into masters athletics. He had stated he intended to set new world records at all distances from 200 metres to the mile. At age 40, he ran the 800 in 1:48.81 at the 2001 USA Indoor Track and Field Championships, which is the World Masters Athletics record indoors. The time was superior to the outdoor world record, most recently held by Jim Sorensen, until that record was surpassed by Anthony Whiteman, May 20, 2012. Based on IAAF rule 260.18a, that should have been the world record, but it was never formally recognized.

== Coaching ==
After competing in six Olympic Trials (1980-2000) he turned to coaching. His foremost protege' was SMTC teammate Khadevis Robinson, who Gray coached to 5 National Championships. Robinson might best be remembered as the odd man out in the famous "Oregon sweep" at the 2008 Olympic Trials. That might be the second closest Olympic Trials race, to Gray's own 1984 trials, when Gray finished second, but was given the same (American record) time as Earl Jones, and James Robinson was the odd man out with the same time as 3rd place John Marshall.

Gray also coached at Harvard-Westlake School for six years. He then worked as an assistant coach at the University of California, Los Angeles with Jeanette Bolden. In 2013, when Boldon moved to head the University of Central Florida program, Gray followed suit. Gray is now coaching top American Duane Solomon.

== Competition record ==
Year	Competition	Venue	Position	Event	Notes
Representing the United States
1984	Olympic Games	Los Angeles, United States	7th	800 m	1:47.89
1986	Goodwill Games	Moscow, Soviet Union	1st	800 m	1:46.52
1987	Pan American Games	Indianapolis, United States	1st	800 m	1:46.79
1987	World Championships	Rome, Italy	30th (qf)	800 m	1:49.50
1988	Olympic Games	Seoul, South Korea	5th	800 m	1:44.80
1990	Goodwill Games	Seattle, United States	7th	800 m	1:48.08
1991	World Championships	Tokyo, Japan	6th	800 m	1:45.67
1992	Olympic Games	Barcelona, Spain	3rd	800 m	1:43.97
1993	World Championships	Stuttgart, Germany	23rd (sf)	800 m	1:50.89
1994	Goodwill Games	St. Petersburg, Russia	10th	800 m	1:51.21
1996	Olympic Games	Atlanta, United States	7th	800 m	1:44.21
1998	Goodwill Games	Uniondale, United States	5th	800 m	1:47.20
1999	Pan American Games	Winnipeg, Canada	1st	800 m	1:45.38
