= Mark Everett (runner) =

American middle-distance runner

Personal information
- Full name: David Mark Everett
- National team: United States
- Born: September 2, 1968 (age 58) Milton, Florida, U.S.
- Height: 6 ft 0 in (1.83 m)
- Weight: 154 lb (70 kg)

Sport
- Sport: Track and field
- Event: 800 meters
- College team: Florida

Achievements and titles
- Personal best: 800 metres: 1:43.20
Medal record
Men's track and field
Representing the United States
World Championships
Bronze medal – third place	1991 Tokyo	800 m
World Indoor Championships
Gold medal – first place	1997 Paris	4 × 400 m relay

David Mark Everett (born September 2, 1968) is an American retired middle-distance runner who won the bronze medal in the 800-meter event at the 1991 World Championships in Tokyo. The following year, Everett finished second in the US Olympic Trials in New Orleans behind Johnny Gray. A few weeks later Everett beat Gray at the Bislett Games in Oslo, setting a new personal best of 1:43.40. Everett and Gray went to Barcelona as favorites for the gold and silver medals. However, Everett did not finish the race and Gray won the Olympic bronze behind William Tanui and Nixon Kiprotich.

Throughout his career, Everett was known for his finishing speed, a kicker, usually coming from behind on the final straightaway. His right arm was flailing awkwardly, some said it made his body look like it was twisting. Dwight Stones reported it was from a broken arm as a child.

Everett is the former head coach of the track and field team at Birmingham–Southern College in Birmingham, Alabama.

Everett is now owner of PrimeTime Scouting. His business is a recruiting service that helps high school athletes get athletic and academic scholarships.

== Running career ==
=== Collegiate ===
Everett was born in Milton, Florida. He attended the University of Florida in Gainesville, Florida, where he ran for the Florida Gators track and field team in National Collegiate Athletic Association (NCAA) competition. He graduated from Florida with a bachelor's degree in exercise and sports science in 1992, and was inducted into the University of Florida Athletic Hall of Fame as a "Gator Great" in 2001.

=== Post-collegiate ===
One of his last achievements was a 4 × 400-meter relay gold medal at the 1997 IAAF World Indoor Championships. Everett also ran in the men's 800 meter race at the 2000 Summer Olympics, although he did not qualify to the final round, recording a time of 1:49.77.

== See also ==
- Florida Gators
- List of University of Florida alumni
- List of University of Florida Olympians
- List of University of Florida Athletic Hall of Fame members
