= Clive Terrelonge =

Jamaican track and field athlete and coach

Personal information
- Born: 30 June 1969 (age 57) Kingston, Jamaica
Medal record
Men's Athletics
Representing Jamaica
World Indoor Championships
Gold medal – first place	1995 Barcelona	800 metres

Clive Terrelonge (born 30 June 1969) is a Jamaican former track and field athlete and current coach for the University of Connecticut. Before coaching, He was an accomplished collegiate and professional athlete who specialized in the 800 m and 400 m.

Terrelonge was twice an Olympian for Jamaica, competing in the 1992 Summer Olympics in Barcelona and in 1996 Olympic Games in Atlanta. At the 1995 IAAF World Indoor Championships, Terrelonge became the first Jamaican to win a World Championship gold medal in the 800 metres.

While competing for Lincoln University (Pennsylvania), Terrelonge earned 19 Division III All-America honors in the 400 m, 800 m and the 4 × 400-meter relay. He is a former NCAA double 400 and triple 800-meter indoor/outdoor champion and held the 800-meter NCAA Division III outdoor record until Nick Symmonds of Willamette University broke it in spring 2006.

Terrelonge was inducted into the NCAA Division III Hall of Fame in 2005.

== See also ==
- List of male middle-distance runners
