= Tom McKean =

British former middle-distance runner (born 1963)

Personal information
- Nationality: British (Scottish)
- Born: 27 October 1963 (age 62) Bellshill, North Lanarkshire, Scotland
- Height: 183 cm (6 ft 0 in)
- Weight: 71 kg (157 lb)

Sport
- Sport: Athletics
- Event: Middle-distance
- Club: Bellshill YMCA / Motherwell AC
Medal record
Men's athletics
Representing Great Britain
World Indoor Championships
Gold medal – first place	1993 Toronto	800 m
World Cup
Gold medal – first place	1989 Barcelona	800 m
European Championships
Gold medal – first place	1990 Split	800 m
Silver medal – second place	1986 Stuttgart	800 m
European Indoor Championships
Gold medal – first place	1990 Glasgow	800 m
Commonwealth Games
Representing Scotland
Silver medal – second place	1986 Edinburgh	800 m
Silver medal – second place	1990 Auckland	4×400 m

Thomas McKean (born 27 October 1963) is a Scottish former middle-distance runner representing Great Britain and Scotland internationally. He was European champion over the 800 metres in 1990, and a world (1993) and European (1990) indoor champion over the 800 metres, one of the few athletes to be both indoor and outdoor European champion in the event simultaneously. He won the IAAF World Cup 800 metres in 1989.

Outdoors, McKean reached the lower steps of podiums at both European and Commonwealth Games level.

Racing during the brief era when two championships for British athletes were held annually, McKean won three British titles; he was twice the 800 metre champion at the AAA Championships, recognised as the premier British athletics championships of the time despite allowing guest runners, while he also won the 800 metres title once at the alternative UK Athletics Championships event for British athletes only.

== Athletics career ==
McKean, who was born in Bellshill, North Lanarkshire, was the winner of the European Championships 800 m gold medal at Split in 1990. McKean also won the 1990 European Indoor Championships final, the 1993 IAAF World Indoor Championships 800 m final, and the World Cup 800 m race in 1989. In addition, he came first in all European Cup races from 1985 to 1991. However, he failed to reach the Olympic final both in 1988, when he was disqualified for too much physical contact, and 1992.

McKean was one of the favourites for the 1987 World Championships in Athletics 800 m. However, he caught the foot of Stephen Ole Marai in the final and suffered an injury which resulted in him finishing last. In first round qualifying for the 1991 World Championships in Athletics 800 m he slowed up too early before the line. He ended up third and failed to qualify. The two athletes ahead of him were eventual Gold and bronze medalists Billy Konchellah and Mark Everett. McKean also won a silver medal in the 1986 European Championships in Athletics 800 m splitting British teammates Sebastian Coe and Steve Cram, an event memorably described by Ian Wooldridge as being "like three Spitfires coming out of the sun". He set his personal best in London in 1989 at 1:43.88 min.

McKean represented Scotland at the Commonwealth Games where he won silver medals in 1986 in the 800 metres event and in 1990 in the 4 × 400 m Relay event.

McKean was a three-times British 800 metres champion after winning the British AAA Championships title at the 1991 AAA Championships, the 1985 UK Athletics Championships and by virtue of being the highest placed British athlete at the 1990 AAA Championships.

== After athletics ==
Unlike some of his contemporaries, McKean did not continue a high-profile role in athletics after his retirement from competition. McKean was a Strathclyde Police officer until retiring in 2022.
