= Charles Nkazamyampi =

Burundian middle-distance runner

Medal record

Men's athletics

Representing Burundi

African Championships
Gold medal – first place	1992 Belle Vue Harel	800 m
Bronze medal – third place	1988 Annaba	4×400 m

Charles Nkazamyampi (born November 1, 1964) is a retired middle-distance runner from Burundi. The 1992 African champion, he was unable to compete at the 1992 Summer Olympics because Burundi did not participate. In 1993 he won a silver medal in 800 metres at the World Indoor Championships, finishing behind Tom McKean. Nkazamyampi later competed at the 1996 Summer Olympics without reaching the final.

His personal best time over 800 metres was 1:44.24 minutes, achieved in 1993.

== Post-Career Activities ==
Charles is the creator of 'Foundation Charles Nkazamyampi' (FCN), which uses sport to unite communities and promote peace throughout the nation of Burundi. They work in 8 provinces across Burundi and encourage youth to sign peace pledges to try and stem possible future violence.
