= Paul Ruto =

Kenyan distance runner

Medal record

Men's athletics

Representing Kenya

World Championships
Gold medal – first place	1993 Stuttgart	800 m

African Championships
Silver medal – second place	1993 Durban	800 m

Paul Ruto (born November 3, 1960) is a former Kenyan 800 metres runner who won a gold medal at the 1993 World Championships in Stuttgart. Ruto took the lead in the first lap and kept it until the end. He was used to front-running, as earlier in his career, he had been employed as a pacemaker at international meetings.
