= Giuseppe D'Urso =

Italian middle-distance runner

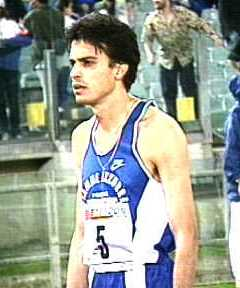

Personal information
- Nationality: Italian
- Born: 15 September 1969 (age 56) Catania, Italy
- Height: 1.90 m (6 ft 3 in)
- Weight: 83 kg (183 lb)

Sport
- Country: Italy
- Sport: Athletics
- Event: Middle distance running
- Club: CUS Roma; Fiamme Azzurre

Achievements and titles
- Personal bests: 800 m: 1:43.95 (1996); 1500 m: 3:35.78 (1998)
Medal record
Event	1st	2nd	3rd
World Championships	0	1	0
European Indoor Championships	0	1	0
Summer Universiade	1	0	0
Mediterranean Games	1	0	0
Total	2	2	0
World Championships
Silver medal – second place	1993 Stuttgart	800 m
Summer Universiade
Gold medal – first place	1991 Sheffield	800 m
European Indoor Championships
Silver medal – second place	1996 Stockholm	800 m
Mediterranean Games
Gold medal – first place	1997 Bari	800 m

Giuseppe D'Urso (born 15 September 1969) is a former Italian 800 metres runner, vice-world champion in 1993.

== Biography ==
Giuseppe D'Urso won four medals, at senior level, at the International athletics competitions. He participated at one edition of the Summer Olympics (1996), he has 31 caps in national team from 1989 to 2000. He won a silver medal at the 1993 World Championships in Stuttgart. In addition he won a silver medal at the 1996 European Indoor Championships. His personal best in 800 metres is 1'43"95.

== Achievements ==
Year	Competition	Venue	Position	Event	Notes
Representing Italy
1988	World Junior Championships	Sudbury, Canada	5th	800m	1:53.34
1990	European Championships	Split, Yugoslavia	7th	800 metres	1:47.29
1991	World Student Games	Sheffield, United Kingdom	1st	800 metres	1:46.82
1993	World Championships	Stuttgart, Germany	2nd	800 metres	1:44.86
1994	European Championships	Helsinki, Finland	5th	800m	1:46.90
1995	World Championships	Gothenburg, Sweden	Heat	800 metres	1:47.43
1996	European Indoor Championships	Stockholm, Sweden	2nd	800 metres	1:48.04
1996	Olympic Games	Atlanta, United States	SF	800 metres	1:46.97
1997	Mediterranean Games	Bari, Italy	1st	800 metres	1:47.10
1997	World Championships	Athens, Greece	DNF	1500 metres	NT
1998	European Championships	Budapest, Hungary	SF	800 metres	1:48.95
1998	European Championships	Budapest, Hungary	DNF	1500 metres	NT
1999	World Championships	Stockholm, Sweden	14th	1500 metres	3:50.71

== National titles ==
He has won 7 times the individual national championship.

- 2 wins in the 800 metres (1993, 1994)
- 3 wins in the 800 metres indoor (1993, 1996, 2000)
- 2 wins in the 1500 metres indoor (1997, 1998)

== See also ==
- Italian all-time lists - 800 metres
- Italian all-time lists - 1500 metres
- Italy at the 1990 European Athletics Championships
