= Paul Ereng =

Kenyan middle-distance runner

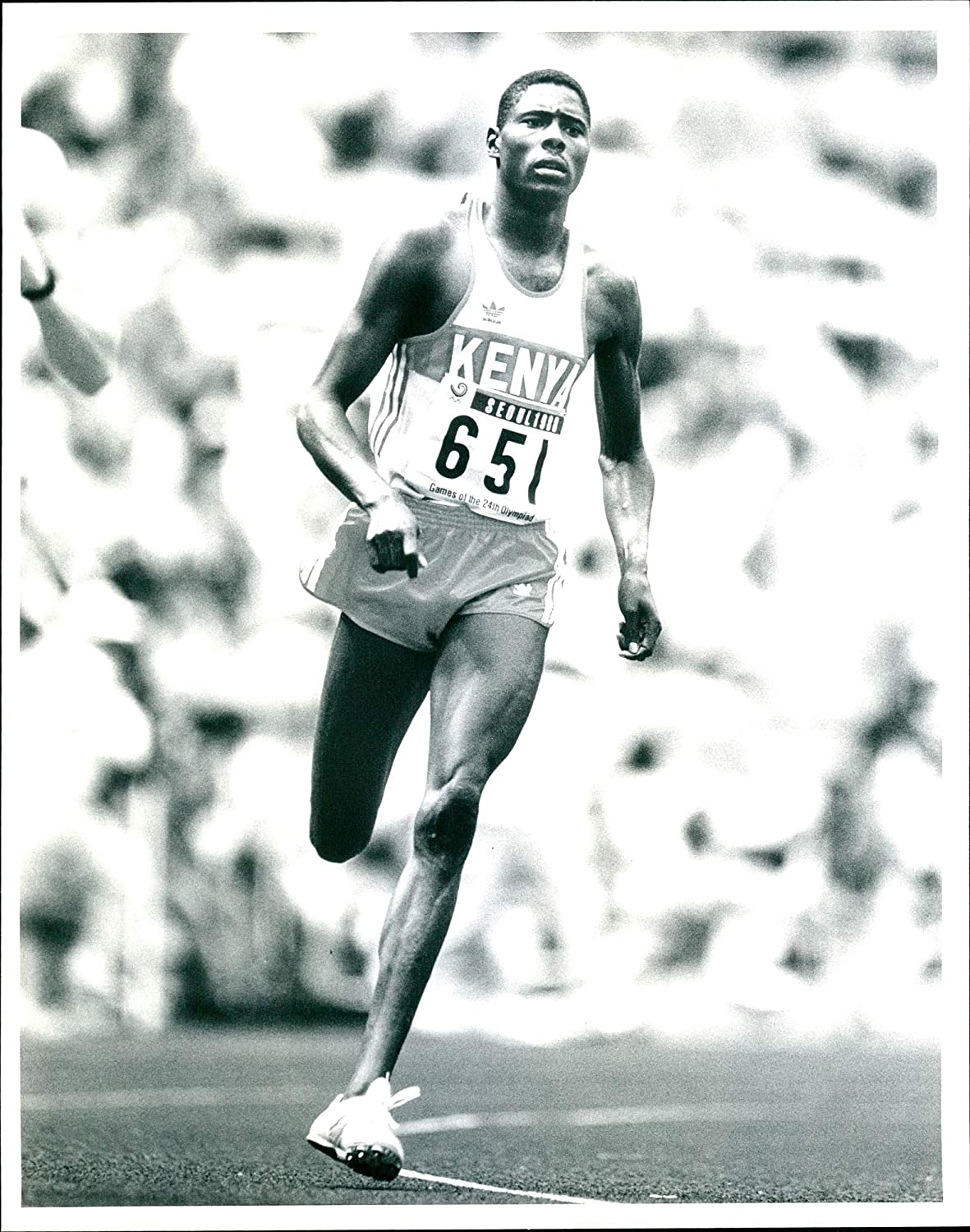

Personal information
- Nationality: Kenyan
- Born: 22 August 1966 (age 59) Kitale, Kenya
- Height: 6 ft 3 in (191 cm)
- Weight: 190 lb (86 kg)

Sport
- Sport: Track
- Events: 400 meters, 800 meters
- College team: UVA
- Retired: 1992
- Now coaching: Texas A&M

Achievements and titles
- Personal bests: 400 meters: 45.6; 800 meters: 1:43.16
Medal record
Men's Athletics
Representing Kenya
Olympic Games
Gold medal – first place	1988 Seoul	800 metres
World Indoor Championships
Gold medal – first place	1989 Budapest	800 metres
Gold medal – first place	1991 Sevilla	800 metres

Paul Ereng (born 22 August 1966) is a former Kenyan athlete, and the surprise winner of the 800 metres at the 1988 Summer Olympics.

Born in Kitale, Trans-Nzoia, Kenya, Paul Ereng attended Starehe Boys Centre and School in Nairobi, Kenya. He was a promising 400 m runner until the end of 1987. After enrolling at the University of Virginia, Ereng took up the 800 m in early 1988.

== Running career ==
Ereng was undefeated during the United States outdoor season in early 1988. While running for UVA, he won the NCAA 800 meter title in 1988 and 1989. But in the Kenyan Olympic trials, Ereng barely qualified for the Olympic team, finishing third. Despite his rapid development, Ereng wasn't seen as a potential gold medalist when he arrived at the Olympic Games in Seoul. However, people started to rate his chances more seriously after he won his semi-final in a personal best of 1:44.55.

In the Olympic final, Ereng was in eighth place out of eight runners (last) for most of the first half of the race, and in seventh place with only 300 meters to go. He was fourth as they entered the straight, but he then surged past the three runners in front of him, which included two former Olympic gold medalists, 1984 5000 meter champion Said Aouita and 1984 800 meter champion Joaquim Cruz, to win the gold medal. Ereng's surge to the line and victory was mistakenly called on live television in the United States as a victory for his Kenyan teammate Nixon Kiprotich by announcers Charlie Jones (sportscaster) and Frank Shorter, as Ereng had passed a fading Kiprotich, who had briefly led the race with 200 meters remaining, and the announcers had confused the two. Ereng has privately revealed to fans that Jones and Shorter both spoke to him later to offer apologies and that he had no hard feelings towards them for their error. Kiprotich himself also persevered and won a silver medal in the 800 meters in the 1992 Olympics held in Barcelona.

After the Olympics, Ereng returned home to Kenya to a hero's welcome, the highlight of which was receiving, in a time-honoured tradition, his gold medal was once more presented to him during evening assembly at his former school, Starehe, by the late Dr. Geoffrey William Griffin. At the World Indoor Championships in Budapest the following year, Ereng produced a devastating finish to win the gold medal in a new world indoor record of 1:44.84.

In 1991, Ereng retained his world indoor title at Seville, but was only fourth in the World Championships at Tokyo. Ereng never posed a serious threat in major international championships after that, and he was eliminated in the semi-finals at the 1992 Olympic Games. Paul Ereng ended his career in 1993 from an injury to the Achilles heel.

== Later career ==
Ereng graduated from Virginia in 1993 with a bachelor's degree in religious studies with a minor in sociology. His wife, Fatima, is a former sales executive of the Nation Media Group. He subsequently took up a job as head cross country coach in the University of Texas at El Paso, the first Kenyan to take such a coaching job.
