= William Tanui =

Kenyan athlete (born 1964)

Personal information
- Nationality: Kenyan
- Born: 22 February 1964 (age 62) Kemeloi, Nandi, Kenya
- Height: 183 cm (6 ft 0 in)
- Weight: 70 kg (154 lb)

Sport
- Sport: Athletics
- Event: middle-distance
Medal record
Men's athletics
Representing Kenya
Olympic Games
| Gold medal – first place | 1992 Barcelona | 800 m |
All-Africa Games
| Gold medal – first place | 1991 Cairo | 800 m |
African Championships
| Gold medal – first place | 1990 Cairo | 800 m |

William Kiptarus Tanui (born 22 February 1964) is a Kenyan former athlete, winner of 800 m at the 1992 Summer Olympics.

== Biography ==
Born in Terik Location of South Nandi District, William Tanui first came to notice relatively late in life, when he won the 1500 m at the Kenyan Commonwealth Games trials in 1989, but ran only sixth at the 1990 Commonwealth Games in Auckland, New Zealand. In the same year he won the 800 m at the African Championships in Cairo. In the World Indoor Championships at Seville in 1991, Tanui crossed the line first, but was disqualified for breaking from his lane too early. He won 800 metres in the 1991 All-Africa Games.

Tanui's greatest moment came at the 1992 Olympic Games in Barcelona. In the 800 m final he stormed down the outside, actually finishing in lane 3, to narrowly beat a fellow countryman Nixon Kiprotich for the gold medal. Tanui was unable to repeat this form in his only appearance at a World Championships, at Stuttgart in 1993, finishing seventh.

He finished 2nd at the IAAF World Cup 800 metres race in 1992 and 1994.

Tanui concentrated more on the 1500 m in the latter part of his career, and he finished fifth at that distance in the 1996 Olympic Games in Atlanta. At the World Indoor Championships, Tanui finished third in the 1500 m at Paris in 1997, and fourth at Maebashi in 1999.

Tanui the British AAA Championships title in the 800 metres event at the 1990 AAA Championships.
