= 1993 IAAF World Indoor Championships =

4th IAAF World Indoor Championships
- Dates: March 12–14
- Host city: Toronto, Ontario, Canada
- Venue: Skydome
- Events: 27 (+4 non-championship)
- Participation: 537 athletes from 93 nations

The 4th IAAF World Indoor Championships in Athletics were held at the Skydome in Toronto, Ontario, Canada from March 12 to March 14, 1993. It was the last Indoor Championships to feature the 5,000 and 3,000 metres race walk events. In addition, it was the first Indoor Championships to include heptathlon and pentathlon, albeit as non-championship events. There were a total number of 537 athletes participated from 93 countries.

== Results ==
=== Men ===
1989 | 1991 | 1993 | 1995 | 1997

Event	Gold		Silver		Bronze	
60 metres	Bruny Surin; Canada	6.50 (CR)	Frankie Fredericks; Namibia	6.51 (NR)	Talal Mansour; Qatar	6.57
200 metres	James Trapp; United States	20.63	Damien Marsh; Australia	20.71	Kevin Little; United States	20.72
400 metres	Butch Reynolds; United States	45.26 (CR)	Sunday Bada; Nigeria	45.75	Darren Clark; Australia	46.45
800 metres	Tom McKean; Great Britain	1:47.29	Charles Nkazamyampi; Burundi	1:47.62	Nico Motchebon; Germany	1:48.15
1500 metres	Marcus O'Sullivan; Ireland	3:45.00	David Strang; Great Britain	3:45.30	Branko Zorko; Croatia	3:45.39
3000 metres	Gennaro Di Napoli; Italy	7:50.26	Eric Dubus; France	7:50.57	Enrique Molina; Spain	7:51.10
60 metres hurdles	Mark McKoy; Canada	7.41 (CR)	Colin Jackson; Great Britain	7.43	Tony Dees; United States	7.43
High jump	Javier Sotomayor; Cuba	2.41	Patrik Sjöberg; Sweden	2.39	Steve Smith; Great Britain	2.37
Pole vault	Rodion Gataullin; Russia	5.90	Grigoriy Yegorov; Kazakhstan	5.80	Jean Galfione; France	5.80
Long jump	Iván Pedroso; Cuba	8.23	Joe Greene; United States	8.13	Jaime Jefferson; Cuba	7.98
Triple jump	Pierre Camara; France	17.59 (CR)	Māris Bružiks; Latvia	17.36	Brian Wellman; Bermuda	17.27
Shot put	Mike Stulce; United States	21.27	Jim Doehring; United States	21.08	Aleksandr Bagach; Ukraine	20.63
4 × 400 metres relay	United States (USA); Darnell Hall; Brian Irvin; Jason Rouser; Mark Everett	3:04.20	Trinidad and Tobago (TRI); Dazel Jules; Alvin Daniel; Neil de Silva; Ian Morris	3:07.02 (NR)	Japan (JPN); Masayoshi Kan; Seiji Inagaki; Yoshihiko Saito; Hiroyuki Hayashi	3:07.30
5000 metres walk	Mikhail Shchennikov; Russia	18:32.10	Robert Korzeniowski; Poland	18:35.91	Mikhail Orlov; Russia	18:43.48

- For doping offenses, the Bulgarians Daniel Ivanov and Nikolai Raev were disqualified from the bronze medals in long and triple jump respectively.

=== Women ===
1989 | 1991 | 1993 | 1995 | 1997

Event	Gold		Silver		Bronze	
60 metres	Gail Devers; United States	6.95 (CR)	Irina Privalova; Russia	6.97	Zhanna Tarnopolskaya; Ukraine	7.21
200 metres	Irina Privalova; Russia	22.15 (CR)	Melinda Gainsford; Australia	22.73	Natalya Voronova; Russia	22.90
400 metres	Sandie Richards; Jamaica	50.93 (NR)	Tatyana Alekseyeva; Russia	51.03	Jearl Miles; United States	51.37
800 metres	Maria Mutola; Mozambique	1:57.55 (CR)	Svetlana Masterkova; Russia	1:59.18	Joetta Clark; United States	1:59.86
1500 metres	Yekaterina Podkopayeva; Russia	4:09.29	Violeta Beclea; Romania	4:09.41	Sandra Gasser; Switzerland	4:10.99
3000 metres	Yvonne Murray; Great Britain	8:50.55	Margareta Keszeg; Romania	9:02.89	Lynn Jennings; United States	9:03.78
60 metres hurdles	Julie Baumann; Switzerland	7.86	LaVonna Martin; United States	7.99	Patricia Girard; France	8.01
High jump	Stefka Kostadinova; Bulgaria	2.02	Heike Henkel; Germany	2.02	Inga Babakova; Ukraine	2.00
Long jump	Marieta Ilcu; Romania	6.84	Susen Tiedtke; Germany	6.84	Inessa Kravets; Ukraine	6.77
Triple jump	Inessa Kravets; Ukraine	14.47 (CR)	Yolanda Chen; Russia	14.36	Inna Lasovskaya; Russia	14.35
Shot put	Svetlana Krivelyova; Russia	19.57	Stephanie Storp; Germany	19.37	Zhang Liuhong; China	19.32
4 × 400 metres relay	Jamaica; Deon Hemmings, Beverly Grant, Cathy Rattray-Williams, Sandie Richards	3:32.32	United States; Trevaia Williams, Terri Dendy, Dyan Webber, Natasha Kaiser-Brown	3:32.50	none	none
3000 metres walk	Yelena Nikolayeva; Russia	11:49.73 (CR)	Kerry Saxby-Junna; Australia	11:53.82	Ileana Salvador; Italy	11:55.35

- The Russian 4 × 400 m relay team won the event and was awarded the gold medal, but was later disqualified when Marina Shmonina was found to have been doping.

== Non-championship events ==
Some events were contested without counting towards the total medal status. The 1600 metres medley relay consisted of four legs over 800 m, 200 m, 200 m and 400 m.

Games	Gold		Silver		Bronze	
Men's heptathlon	Dan O'Brien; United States	6476	Mike Smith; Canada	6279	Eduard Hämäläinen; Belarus	6075
Women's pentathlon	Liliana Nastase; Romania	4686	Urszula Włodarczyk; Poland	4667	Birgit Clarius; Germany	4641
Women's pentathlon	Irina Belova (RUS) won the women's pentathlon and was awarded the gold medal, but was later disqualified when she was found to have been doping.					
Men's 1600 metres Medley Relay	United States; Mark Everett, James Trapp, Kevin Little, Butch Reynolds	3:15.10	Brazil; Gilmar dos Santos, André Domingos, Sidnei de Souza, Eronilde de Araújo	3:16.11	Canada; Freddie Williams, Ricardo Greenidge, Peter Ogilvie, Mark Jackson	3:16.93
Women's 1600 metres Medley Relay	United States; Joetta Clark, Wendy Vereen, Kim Batten, Jearl Miles	3:45.90	Canada; Donalda Duprey, Sonia Paquette, Mame Twumasi, Alanna Yakiwchuk	3:56.34	none	none
Women's 1600 metres Medley Relay	The Russian women's 1600 metres medley relay team, composed of Yelena Afanasyeva, Marina Shmonina, Yelena Rusina and Yelena Andreyeva, originally won the event, but were later disqualified when Shmonina was found to have been doping.					

== Medal table ==
Rank	Nation	Gold	Silver	Bronze	Total
1	Russia	6	4	3	13
2	United States (USA)	5	4	5	14
3	Great Britain (GBR)	2	2	1	5
4	Cuba (CUB)	2	0	1	3
5	Canada (CAN)	2	0	0	2
5	Jamaica (JAM)	2	0	0	2
7	Romania (ROM)	1	2	0	3
8	France (FRA)	1	1	2	4
9	Ukraine (UKR)	1	0	4	5
10	Italy (ITA)	1	0	1	2
10	Switzerland (SUI)	1	0	1	2
12	Bulgaria (BUL)	1	0	0	1
12	Ireland (IRL)	1	0	0	1
12	Mozambique (MOZ)	1	0	0	1
15	Australia (AUS)	0	3	1	4
15	Germany (GER)	0	3	1	4
17	Burundi (BDI)	0	1	0	1
17	Kazakhstan (KAZ)	0	1	0	1
17	Latvia (LAT)	0	1	0	1
17	Namibia (NAM)	0	1	0	1
17	Nigeria (NGR)	0	1	0	1
17	Poland (POL)	0	1	0	1
17	Sweden (SWE)	0	1	0	1
17	Trinidad and Tobago (TRI)	0	1	0	1
25	Bermuda (BER)	0	0	1	1
25	China (CHN)	0	0	1	1
25	Croatia (CRO)	0	0	1	1
25	Japan (JPN)	0	0	1	1
25	Qatar (QAT)	0	0	1	1
25	Spain (ESP)	0	0	1	1
Totals (30 entries)		27	27	26	80

== Participating nations ==
- Angola (1)
- Argentina (2)
- Armenia (1)
- Aruba (1)
- Australia (10)
- Austria (6)
- Azerbaijan (5)
- Bahamas (2)
- Belarus (6)
- Belgium (7)
- Bermuda (2)
- Bolivia (1)
- Botswana (1)
- Brazil (8)
- Bulgaria (7)
- Burundi (2)
- Canada (37)
- Cape Verde (1)
- Central African Republic (1)
- Chile (2)
- China (12)
- Chinese Taipei (2)
- Croatia (1)
- Cuba (13)
- Czech Republic (8)
- Denmark (3)
- Dominica (1)
- Estonia (2)
- Ethiopia (1)
- Finland (9)
- France (15)
- Germany (29)
- Ghana (2)
- Great Britain (26)
- Greece (7)
- Hong Kong (1)
- Hungary (6)
- Iceland (2)
- Ireland (6)
- Israel (2)
- Italy (19)
- Ivory Coast (2)
- Jamaica (15)
- Japan (8)
- Kazakhstan (3)
- Kenya (3)
- Kuwait (1)
- Kyrgyzstan (1)
- Latvia (5)
- Lithuania (6)
- Madagascar (2)
- Malaysia (2)
- Mali (1)
- Montserrat (1)
- Mexico (1)
- Moldova (2)
- Morocco (6)
- Mozambique (1)
- Namibia (1)
- Netherlands (9)
- New Zealand (1)
- Nigeria (2)
- Norway (6)
- Paraguay (1)
- Philippines (1)
- Poland (6)
- Portugal (7)
- Puerto Rico (2)
- Qatar (2)
- Romania (19)
- Russia (34)
- Saint Lucia (1)
- El Salvador (2)
- Senegal (1)
- Sierra Leone (1)
- Slovakia (4)
- Slovenia (3)
- South Africa (5)
- South Korea (2)
- Spain (18)
- Swaziland (2)
- Sweden (9)
- Switzerland (7)
- Togo (1)
- Trinidad and Tobago (4)
- Turkey (2)
- Uganda (2)
- Ukraine (13)
- United States (56)
- United States Virgin Islands (1)
- Uzbekistan (1)
- Zaire (1)
- Zambia (1)

== See also ==
- 1993 in athletics (track and field)
