= List of Czechoslovak Athletics Championships winners =

The Czechoslovak Athletics Championships (Czech: Mistrovství Československé v atletice) was an annual outdoor track and field competition organised by the Czechoslovakia Athletics Association, which served as the national championship for the sport in Czechoslovakia from 1919 to 1992. After the dissolution of Czechoslovakia in 1993, the competition was replaced by independent Slovak and Czech championships.

== Men ==
=== 100 metres ===
- 1960: František Miklušcák
- 1961: Vilém Mandlík
- 1962: Vilém Mandlík
- 1963: Josef Votrubec
- 1964: Vilém Mandlík
- 1965: Vilém Mandlík
- 1966: Herbert Bende
- 1967: Juraj Demeč
- 1968: Petr Utekal
- 1969: Luděk Bohman
- 1970: Juraj Demeč
- 1971: Luděk Bohman
- 1972: Juraj Demeč
- 1973: Juraj Demeč
- 1974: Jaroslav Matoušek
- 1975: Juraj Demeč
- 1976: Jaroslav Matoušek
- 1977: Martin Pelach
- 1978: Zdenek Mazur
- 1979: Ladislav Latocha
- 1980: Roman Lacko
- 1981: Josef Lomický
- 1982: Zdenek Mazur
- 1983: Luboš Chochlík
- 1984: František Ptácník
- 1985: Luboš Chochlík
- 1986: Luboš Chochlík
- 1987: Jiří Valík
- 1988: Jiří Valík
- 1989: Jiří Valík
- 1990: Jiří Valík
- 1991: Jiří Valík
- 1992: Jiří Valík

=== 200 metres ===
- 1960: Vilém Mandlík
- 1961: Vilém Mandlík
- 1962: Vilém Mandlík
- 1963: Josef Votrubec
- 1964: Vilém Mandlík
- 1965: Vilém Mandlík
- 1966: Ladislav Kríž
- 1967: Jirí Kynos
- 1968: Ladislav Kríž
- 1969: Jirí Kynos
- 1970: Jirí Kynos
- 1971: Luděk Bohman
- 1972: Jirí Kynos
- 1973: Jaroslav Matoušek
- 1974: Jaroslav Matoušek
- 1975: Luděk Bohman
- 1976: Jaroslav Matoušek
- 1977: Martin Pelach
- 1978: Martin Pelach
- 1979: Karel Kolář
- 1980: Karel Kolář
- 1981: František Brecka
- 1982: František Brecka
- 1983: Ján Tomko
- 1984: František Brecka
- 1985: Luboš Balošák
- 1986: Josef Lomický
- 1987: Josef Lomický
- 1988: Jiří Valík
- 1989: Jiří Valík
- 1990: Luboš Ruda
- 1991: Jiří Valík
- 1992: Jiří Valík

=== 400 metres ===
- 1960: Josef Trousil
- 1961: Josef Trousil
- 1962: Josef Trousil
- 1963: Zdenek Vána
- 1964: Josef Trousil
- 1965: Josef Trousil
- 1966: Josef Trousil
- 1967: Josef Hegyes
- 1968: Josef Hegyes
- 1969: Tomáš Jungwirth
- 1970: Jiří Ryba
- 1971: Miroslav Tulis
- 1972: Miroslav Tulis
- 1973: Ivan Daniš
- 1974: Miroslav Tulis
- 1975: Jindrich Kohout
- 1976: Ján Svrcek
- 1977: Miroslav Tulis
- 1978: Karel Kolář
- 1979: Karel Kolář
- 1980: Karel Kolář
- 1981: Dušan Malovec
- 1982: Stanislav Sajdok
- 1983: Ján Tomko
- 1984: Ján Tomko
- 1985: Jindrich Roun
- 1986: Petr Brecka
- 1987: Luboš Balošák
- 1988: Luboš Balošák
- 1989: Luboš Balošák
- 1990: Luboš Josták
- 1991: Jindrich Roun
- 1992: Jirí Janoušek

=== 800 metres ===
- 1960: Josef Odložil
- 1961: Milan Jílek
- 1962: Josef Odložil
- 1963: Josef Odložil
- 1964: Jan Kasal
- 1965: Tomáš Jungwirth
- 1966: Tomáš Jungwirth
- 1967: Jan Kasal
- 1968: Tomáš Jungwirth & Jozef Plachý
- 1969: Jozef Plachý
- 1970: Petr Bláha
- 1971: Jozef Plachý
- 1972: Jozef Plachý
- 1973: Jozef Plachý
- 1974: Jozef Plachý
- 1975: Jozef Plachý
- 1976: Jozef Plachý
- 1977: Jozef Plachý
- 1978: Milan Timko
- 1979: Josef Vedra
- 1980: Jirí Dlouhý
- 1981: Jan Kubišta
- 1982: Jan Kubišta
- 1983: Jan Kubišta
- 1984: Luboš Šubrt
- 1985: Luboš Šubrt
- 1986: Milan Drahonovský
- 1987: Marcel Theer
- 1988: Milan Drahonovský
- 1989: Marcel Theer
- 1990: Pavel Soukup
- 1991: Pavel Soukup
- 1992: Pavel Soukup

=== 1500 metres ===
- 1960: Alexander Zvolenský
- 1961: Tomáš Salinger
- 1962: Tomáš Salinger
- 1963: Tomáš Salinger
- 1964: Josef Odložil
- 1965: Josef Odložil
- 1966: Josef Odložil
- 1967: Josef Odložil
- 1968: Pavel Penkava
- 1969: Pavel Penkava
- 1970: Josef Horčic
- 1971: Pavel Penkava
- 1972: Ivan Kovác
- 1973: Pavel Penkava
- 1974: Ivan Kovác
- 1975: Ján Šišovský
- 1976: Ján Šišovský
- 1977: Árpád Bari
- 1978: Jozef Plachý
- 1979: Jozef Lencéš
- 1980: Jozef Plachý
- 1981: Árpád Bari
- 1982: Josef Vedra
- 1983: Josef Vedra
- 1984: Josef Vedra
- 1985: Pavel Michálek
- 1986: Jan Kraus
- 1987: Jan Kraus
- 1988: Radim Kuncický
- 1989: Pavel Šourek
- 1990: Milan Drahonovský
- 1991: Milan Drahonovský
- 1992: Radim Kuncický

=== 5000 metres ===
- 1960: Miroslav Jurek
- 1961: Miroslav Jurek
- 1962: Miroslav Jurek
- 1963: Josef Tomáš
- 1964: Josef Tomáš
- 1965: Karel Szotkowski
- 1966: Jirí Stehlík
- 1967: Pavel Faschingbauer
- 1968: Stanislav Petr
- 1969: Stanislav Petr
- 1970: Josef Jánský
- 1971: Stanislav Hoffman
- 1972: Pavel Penkava
- 1973: Stanislav Petr
- 1974: Pavel Penkava
- 1975: Pavel Penkava
- 1976: Jozef Noskovic
- 1977: Jozef Noskovic
- 1978: Alexander Schmidt
- 1979: Ivan Uvizl
- 1980: Lubomír Tesáček
- 1981: Stanislav Tábor
- 1982: Ivan Uvizl
- 1983: Lubomír Tesáček
- 1984: Martin Vrábeľ
- 1985: Martin Vrábeľ
- 1986: Lubomír Tesáček
- 1987: Zdenek Mezuliáník
- 1988: Jozef Výboštok
- 1989: Pavel Michálek
- 1990: Luboš Gaisl
- 1991: Róbert Štefko
- 1992: Jan Pešava

=== 10,000 metres ===
- 1960: Mirko Graf
- 1961: Vojtech Hec
- 1962: Pavel Kantorek
- 1963: Štefan Tejbus
- 1964: Štefan Tejbus
- 1965: Josef Tomáš
- 1966: Josef Tomáš
- 1967: Vladimír Balšánek
- 1968: Václav Mládek
- 1969: Václav Mládek
- 1970: Josef Jánský
- 1971: Josef Jánský
- 1972: Josef Jánský
- 1973: Josef Jánský
- 1974: Stanislav Hoffman
- 1975: Stanislav Hoffman
- 1976: Petr Suchan
- 1977: Alexander Schmidt
- 1978: Alexander Schmidt
- 1979: František Bartoš
- 1980: Jiří Sýkora
- 1981: Martin Vrábeľ
- 1982: Martin Vrábeľ
- 1983: Stanislav Tábor
- 1984: Martin Vrábeľ
- 1985: Martin Vrábeľ
- 1986: Martin Vrábeľ
- 1987: Martin Vrábeľ
- 1988: Martin Vrábeľ
- 1989: Martin Vrábeľ
- 1990: Petr Pipa
- 1991: Róbert Štefko
- 1992: Róbert Štefko

=== 25K run ===
- 1960: Miroslav Ciboch
- 1961: Pavel Kantorek
- 1990: Lubomír Tesáček

=== Marathon ===
The 1984 Czechoslovak Marathon Championships was held on a short course, but the winner remained valid.

- 1960: Jaroslav Šourek
- 1961: Pavel Kantorek
- 1962: Pavel Kantorek
- 1963: Václav Chudomel
- 1964: Pavel Kantorek
- 1965: Miroslav Ciboch
- 1966: Václav Chudomel
- 1967: Pavel Kantorek
- 1968: Václav Chudomel
- 1969: Václav Chudomel
- 1970: Josef Podmolík
- 1971: Josef Podmolík
- 1972: Josef Podmolík
- 1973: Václav Mládek
- 1974: Pavel Lichnovský
- 1975: Václav Mládek
- 1976: Ondrej Zelenanský
- 1977: Josef Jánský
- 1978: Josef Jánský
- 1979: Stanislav Tománek
- 1980: Pavol Madár
- 1981: Pavol Madár
- 1982: Miroslav Becka
- 1983: František Pechek
- 1984: Stanislav Tománek
- 1985: Miroslav Becka
- 1986: Miroslav Becka
- 1987: Karel David
- 1988: Vlastimil Bukovjan
- 1989: Karel David
- 1990: Alexandr Neuwirth
- 1991: Vlastimil Bukovjan
- 1992: Alexandr Neuwirth

=== 3000 metres steeplechase ===
- 1960: Vlastimil Brlica
- 1961: Bohumír Zhánal
- 1962: Bohumír Zhánal
- 1963: Bohumír Zhánal
- 1964: Bohumír Zhánal
- 1965: Petr Holas
- 1966: Petr Holas
- 1967: Jirí Pazourek
- 1968: Petr Holas
- 1969: Petr Holas
- 1970: František Bartoš
- 1971: Dušan Moravcík
- 1972: Josef Horčic
- 1973: Róbert Molnár
- 1974: Róbert Molnár
- 1975: František Bartoš
- 1976: Dušan Moravcík
- 1977: František Bartoš
- 1978: František Bartoš
- 1979: Milan Slovák
- 1980: Dušan Moravcík
- 1981: Milan Slovák
- 1982: Milan Behún
- 1983: Milan Behún
- 1984: Václav Pátek
- 1985: Luboš Gaisl
- 1986: Stanislav Štít
- 1987: Luboš Gaisl
- 1988: Luboš Gaisl
- 1989: Jirí Švec
- 1990: Luboš Gaisl
- 1991: Jirí Švec
- 1992: Jirí Švec

=== 110 metres hurdles ===
- 1960: Ivo Pechar
- 1961: Pavel Kurfürst
- 1962: Jirí Cernosek
- 1963: Jirí Cernosek
- 1964: Milan Cecman
- 1965: Milan Cecman
- 1966: Milan Cecman
- 1967: Milan Cecman
- 1968: Lubomír Nádenícek
- 1969: Ivan Cierny & František Slavotínek
- 1970: Lubomír Nádenícek
- 1971: Lubomír Nádenícek
- 1972: Lubomír Nádenícek
- 1973: Lubomír Nádenícek
- 1974: Petr Čech
- 1975: Július Ivan
- 1976: Jirí Cerovský
- 1977: Petr Čech
- 1978: Petr Čech
- 1979: Július Ivan
- 1980: Július Ivan
- 1981: Július Ivan
- 1982: Jan Tešitel
- 1983: Július Ivan
- 1984: Jiří Hudec
- 1985: Aleš Höffer
- 1986: Pavel Šáda
- 1987: Aleš Höffer
- 1988: Pavel Šáda
- 1989: Aleš Höffer
- 1990: Igor Kováč
- 1991: Igor Kováč
- 1992: Jiří Hudec

=== 200 metres hurdles ===
- 1960: Miroslav Jareš
- 1961: Miroslav Jareš
- 1962: Milan Cecman
- 1963: Milan Cecman
- 1964: Milan Cecman
- 1965: Milan Cecman
- 1966: Árpád Kovác
- 1967: Milan Cecman

=== 400 metres hurdles ===
- 1960: Miroslav David
- 1961: Miroslav Jareš
- 1962: František Mandlík
- 1963: Miroslav Hruš
- 1964: František Mandlík
- 1965: František Mandlík
- 1966: Miroslav Hruš
- 1967: Miroslav Hruš
- 1968: Miroslav Hruš
- 1969: Miroslav Hruš
- 1970: Miroslav Hruš
- 1971: Ivan Daniš
- 1972: Ladislav Kárský
- 1973: Miroslav Kodejš
- 1974: Miroslav Kodejš
- 1975: Ladislav Kárský
- 1976: Ladislav Burval
- 1977: Ladislav Kárský
- 1978: Miroslav Kodejš
- 1979: Miroslav Kodejš
- 1980: Ladislav Kárský
- 1981: Miroslav Kodejš
- 1982: Ladislav Kárský
- 1983: Vladislav Pecen
- 1984: Stanislav Návesnák
- 1985: Stanislav Návesnák
- 1986: Jozef Kucej
- 1987: Jozef Kucej
- 1988: Stanislav Návesnák
- 1989: Jozef Kucej
- 1990: Jozef Kucej
- 1991: Jozef Kucej
- 1992: Jozef Kucej

=== High jump ===
- 1960: Jirí Lánský
- 1961: Milan Valenta
- 1962: Zdeněk Matějka
- 1963: Jirí Lánský
- 1964: Jirí Lánský
- 1965: Josef Krybus
- 1966: Jan Veselý
- 1967: Rudolf Hübner
- 1968: Jaromír Alexa
- 1969: Rudolf Baudiš
- 1970: Rudolf Baudiš
- 1971: Roman Moravec
- 1972: Jaromír Alexa
- 1973: Roman Moravec
- 1974: Vladimír Malý
- 1975: Roman Moravec
- 1976: Roman Moravec
- 1977: Roman Moravec
- 1978: Josef Hrabal
- 1979: Jindrich Vondra
- 1980: Jindrich Vondra
- 1981: Jindrich Vondra
- 1982: Josef Hrabal
- 1983: Jindrich Vondra
- 1984: Lubomír Roško
- 1985: Ján Zvara
- 1986: Ján Zvara
- 1987: Róbert Ruffíni
- 1988: Róbert Ruffíni
- 1989: Róbert Ruffíni
- 1990: Zdenek Kubišta
- 1991: Róbert Ruffíni
- 1992: Tomáš Janků

=== Pole vault ===
- 1960: Zdenek Brejcha
- 1961: Rudolf Tomášek
- 1962: Rudolf Tomášek
- 1963: Rudolf Tomášek
- 1964: Rudolf Tomášek
- 1965: Rudolf Tomášek
- 1966: Rudolf Tomášek
- 1967: Rudolf Tomášek
- 1968: Pavel Jindra
- 1969: Jan Odvárka
- 1970: Jirí Petrícek
- 1971: Rudolf Tomášek
- 1972: Karel Jelínek
- 1973: Karel Jelínek
- 1974: Antonín Hadinger
- 1975: Karel Jelínek
- 1976: Antonín Hadinger
- 1977: Jirí Lesák
- 1978: Roman Zrun
- 1979: Petr Habel
- 1980: Petr Habel
- 1981: František Jansa
- 1982: František Jansa
- 1983: František Jansa
- 1984: František Jansa
- 1985: Zdeněk Lubenský
- 1986: Zdeněk Lubenský
- 1987: Zdeněk Lubenský
- 1988: Zdeněk Lubenský
- 1989: Zdeněk Lubenský
- 1990: František Jansa
- 1991: Zdeněk Lubenský
- 1992: František Jansa

=== Long jump ===
- 1960: Jan Netopilík
- 1961: Josef Bílek
- 1962: Štefan Molnár
- 1963: Ján Solcány
- 1964: Ján Koštial
- 1965: Jan Broda
- 1966: Miroslav Hutter
- 1967: Miroslav Hutter
- 1968: Jan Broda
- 1969: Jan Broda
- 1970: Václav Fišer
- 1971: Jaroslav Brož
- 1972: Jaroslav Brož
- 1973: Jaroslav Brož
- 1974: Pavol Tolnay
- 1975: Jan Leitner
- 1976: Jan Leitner
- 1977: Jan Leitner
- 1978: Jan Leitner
- 1979: Jan Leitner
- 1980: Jan Leitner
- 1981: Jan Leitner
- 1982: Jan Leitner
- 1983: Vlastimil Mařinec
- 1984: Jan Leitner
- 1985: Jan Leitner
- 1986: Zdenek Hanácek
- 1987: Ivo Krsek
- 1988: Milan Mikuláš
- 1989: Milan Gombala
- 1990: Milan Gombala
- 1991: Milan Gombala
- 1992: Milan Gombala

=== Triple jump ===
- 1960: František Krupala
- 1961: František Krupala
- 1962: Vlastimil Kálecký
- 1963: Vlastimil Kálecký
- 1964: Miloš Hornych
- 1965: Petr Nemšovský
- 1966: Petr Nemšovský
- 1967: Petr Nemšovský
- 1968: Jirí Vycichlo
- 1969: Petr Nemšovský
- 1970: Jan Broda
- 1971: Jirí Vycichlo
- 1972: Václav Fišer
- 1973: Jirí Vycichlo
- 1974: Jirí Vycichlo
- 1975: Pavel Sasín
- 1976: Jirí Vycichlo
- 1977: Jirí Vycichlo
- 1978: Jirí Vycichlo
- 1979: Karel Hradil
- 1980: Vlastimil Mařinec
- 1981: Vlastimil Mařinec
- 1982: Jaroslav Prišcák
- 1983: Vlastimil Mařinec
- 1984: Vlastimil Mařinec
- 1985: Jaroslav Prišcák
- 1986: Ján Čado
- 1987: Ivan Slanař
- 1988: Milan Mikuláš
- 1989: Jaroslav Mrštík
- 1990: Milan Mikuláš
- 1991: Milan Mikuláš
- 1992: Milan Mikuláš

=== Shot put ===
- 1960: Jirí Skobla
- 1961: Jirí Skobla
- 1962: Jirí Skobla
- 1963: Jaroslav Šmíd
- 1964: Jirí Skobla
- 1965: Jaroslav Šmíd
- 1966: Jirí Skobla
- 1967: Jaroslav Šmíd
- 1968: Miroslav Janoušek
- 1969: Miroslav Janoušek
- 1970: Jaroslav Šmíd
- 1971: Jaroslav Brabec
- 1972: Jaroslav Brabec
- 1973: Jaroslav Brabec
- 1974: Jaromír Vlk
- 1975: Jaroslav Brabec
- 1976: Jaroslav Brabec
- 1977: Jaromír Vlk
- 1978: Jaromír Vlk
- 1979: Jaroslav Brabec
- 1980: Jaromír Vlk
- 1981: Jaroslav Brabec
- 1982: Jaroslav Brabec
- 1983: Remigius Machura
- 1984: Remigius Machura
- 1985: Remigius Machura
- 1986: Jozef Kubeš
- 1987: Remigius Machura
- 1988: Remigius Machura
- 1989: Remigius Machura
- 1990: Remigius Machura
- 1991: Karel Šula
- 1992: Karel Šula

=== Discus throw ===
- 1960: Zdeněk Němec
- 1961: Zdeněk Němec
- 1962: Ladislav Petrovic
- 1963: Ludvík Daněk
- 1964: Ludvík Daněk
- 1965: Ludvík Daněk
- 1966: Ludvík Daněk
- 1967: Ludvík Daněk
- 1968: Ludvík Daněk
- 1969: Ludvík Daněk
- 1970: Ludvík Daněk
- 1971: Ludvík Daněk
- 1972: Ludvík Daněk
- 1973: Ludvík Daněk
- 1974: Ludvík Daněk
- 1975: Ludvík Daněk
- 1976: Ludvík Daněk
- 1977: Josef Šilhavý
- 1978: Imrich Bugár
- 1979: Imrich Bugár
- 1980: Imrich Bugár
- 1981: Imrich Bugár
- 1982: Imrich Bugár
- 1983: Imrich Bugár
- 1984: Imrich Bugár
- 1985: Imrich Bugár
- 1986: Imrich Bugár
- 1987: Géjza Valent
- 1988: Imrich Bugár
- 1989: Géjza Valent
- 1990: Imrich Bugár
- 1991: Imrich Bugár
- 1992: Imrich Bugár

=== Hammer throw ===
- 1960: Josef Málek
- 1961: Josef Málek
- 1962: Josef Málek
- 1963: Josef Matoušek
- 1964: Josef Matoušek
- 1965: Josef Matoušek
- 1966: Josef Matoušek
- 1967: Josef Hájek
- 1968: Josef Matoušek
- 1969: Herbert Schenker
- 1970: Josef Hájek
- 1971: Josef Hájek
- 1972: Josef Hájek
- 1973: Jaroslav Charvát
- 1974: Jaroslav Charvát
- 1975: Josef Hájek
- 1976: Josef Hájek
- 1977: Jirí Chamrád
- 1978: Radomil Skoumal
- 1979: Radomil Skoumal
- 1980: Jirí Chamrád
- 1981: Jirí Chamrád
- 1982: Jirí Chamrád
- 1983: Jirí Chamrád
- 1984: Zdenek Bednár
- 1985: František Vrbka
- 1986: Zdenek Bednár
- 1987: Pavel Sedláček
- 1988: František Vrbka
- 1989: František Vrbka
- 1990: Miroslav Spurný
- 1991: Pavel Sedláček
- 1992: Pavel Sedláček

=== Javelin throw ===
- 1960: Jan Perek
- 1961: Miloš Vojtek
- 1962: Miloš Vojtek
- 1963: Josef Dušátko
- 1964: Josef Dušátko
- 1965: Josef Dušátko
- 1966: Miloš Vojtek
- 1967: Josef Dušátko
- 1968: Miloš Vojtek
- 1969: Miloš Vojtek
- 1970: Josef Kolár
- 1971: Miloš Vojtek
- 1972: Jan Bartek
- 1973: Jaroslav Halva
- 1974: Tomáš Babiak
- 1975: Tomáš Babiak
- 1976: Tomáš Babiak
- 1977: Josef Hanák
- 1978: Jan Bartek
- 1979: Tomáš Babiak
- 1980: Zdeněk Adamec
- 1981: Tomáš Babiak
- 1982: Jozef Hanušovský
- 1983: Zdeněk Adamec
- 1984: Zdeněk Adamec
- 1985: Zdeněk Adamec
- 1986: Jan Železný
- 1987: Zdeněk Adamec
- 1988: Zdeněk Nenadál
- 1989: Zdeněk Nenadál
- 1990: Jan Železný
- 1991: Ján Garaj
- 1992: Miloš Steigauf

=== Decathlon ===
- 1960: Václav Becvárovský
- 1961: Josef Habr
- 1962: Pavel Kurfürst
- 1963: Milan Kotík
- 1964: Milan Kotík
- 1965: Milan Kotík
- 1966: Vladimír Novotný
- 1967: Milan Kotík
- 1968: Ivan Sedlácek
- 1969: Jan Neckár
- 1970: Vladimír Novotný
- 1971: Petr Krátký
- 1972: Ludek Pernica
- 1973: Jan Neckár
- 1974: Ludek Pernica
- 1975: Jan Neckár
- 1976: Petr Krátký
- 1977: Petr Krátký
- 1978: Petr Šárec
- 1979: Jirí Knejp
- 1980: Jirí Knejp
- 1981: Petr Šárec
- 1982: Martin Machura
- 1983: Martin Machura
- 1984: Martin Machura
- 1985: Martin Machura
- 1986: Roman Hrabaň
- 1987: Věroslav Valenta
- 1988: Petr Horn
- 1989: Lubomír Matoušek
- 1990: Věroslav Valenta
- 1991: Petr Horn
- 1992: Kamil Damašek

=== 20 kilometres walk ===
The 1972 race was held as a 20,000 metres track walk. The 1991 race was held on a short course, but the winner remained valid.

- 1960: Ladislav Moc
- 1961: Ladislav Moc
- 1962: Alexandr Bílek
- 1963: Alexandr Bílek
- 1964: Alexandr Bílek
- 1965: Vilém Švajda
- 1966: Alexandr Bílek
- 1967: Alexandr Bílek
- 1968: Alexandr Bílek
- 1969: Alexandr Bílek
- 1970: Alexandr Bílek
- 1971: Alexandr Bílek
- 1972: Alexandr Bílek
- 1973: Juraj Bencík
- 1974: Milan Vala
- 1975: Juraj Bencík
- 1976: Juraj Bencík
- 1977: Juraj Bencík
- 1978: Štefan Petrík
- 1979: Jozef Pribilinec
- 1980: Štefan Petrík
- 1981: Pavol Blažek
- 1982: Jozef Pribilinec
- 1983: Jozef Pribilinec
- 1984: Jozef Pribilinec
- 1985: Jozef Pribilinec
- 1986: Jozef Pribilinec
- 1987: Roman Mrázek
- 1988: Jozef Pribilinec
- 1989: Ján Záhoncík
- 1990: Pavol Blažek
- 1991: Pavol Blažek
- 1992: Igor Kollár

=== 50 kilometres walk ===
- 1960: Josef Doležal
- 1961: Ladislav Moc
- 1962: Ladislav Moc
- 1963: Ladislav Moc
- 1964: Ladislav Moc
- 1965: Oldrich Stránský
- 1966: Oldrich Stránský
- 1967: Vladimír Parízek
- 1968: Alexandr Bílek
- 1969: Alexandr Bílek
- 1970: Juraj Bencík
- 1971: Alexandr Bílek
- 1972: Juraj Bencík
- 1973: František Bíro
- 1974: Milan Bartoš
- 1975: Jaroslav Pták
- 1976: Ján Dzurnák
- 1977: Josef Macek
- 1978: Ladislav Vitéz
- 1979: Jaromír Vanous
- 1980: Luboš Mackanic
- 1981: Luboš Mackanic
- 1982: Vladimír Podroužek
- 1983: Pavol Szikora
- 1984: Jozef Hudák
- 1985: Pavol Szikora
- 1986: Pavol Szikora
- 1987: Jozef Hudák
- 1988: Pavol Szikora
- 1989: Hubert Sonnek
- 1990: Pavol Szikora
- 1991: Pavol Szikora
- 1992: Štefan Malík

== Women ==
=== 100 metres ===
- 1960: Alena Stolzová
- 1961: Vlasta Bubíková
- 1962: Vlasta Prikrylová
- 1963: Alena Stolzová
- 1964: Eva Glesková
- 1965: Vlasta Prikrylová
- 1966: Eva Glesková
- 1967: Eva Glesková
- 1968: Eva Glesková
- 1969: Eva Glesková
- 1970: Jitka Birnbaumová
- 1971: Jitka Birnbaumová
- 1972: Eva Glesková
- 1973: Vera Knapová
- 1974: Vera Knapová
- 1975: Eva Šuranová
- 1976: Jarmila Nygrýnová
- 1977: Ludmila Jimramovská
- 1978: Radislava Šoborová
- 1979: Jarmila Kratochvílová
- 1980: Jarmila Kratochvílová
- 1981: Daniela Drinková
- 1982: Taťána Kocembová
- 1983: Eva Murková
- 1984: Štepánka Sokolová
- 1985: Taťána Kocembová
- 1986: Eva Murková
- 1987: Monika Špicková
- 1988: Renata Cernochová
- 1989: Erika Suchovská
- 1990: Renata Kubalová
- 1991: Monika Špicková
- 1992: Monika Špicková

=== 200 metres ===
- 1960: Vlasta Bubíková
- 1961: Jirina Soldátová
- 1962: Eva Glesková
- 1963: Eva Glesková
- 1964: Eva Glesková
- 1965: Libuše Eichlerová
- 1966: Eva Glesková
- 1967: Vlasta Přikrylová
- 1968: Eva Glesková
- 1969: Eva Glesková
- 1970: Jana Šmerdová
- 1971: Vlasta Přikrylová
- 1972: Eva Glesková
- 1973: Vera Knapová
- 1974: Jozefína Cerchlanová
- 1975: Vera Knapová
- 1976: Jarmila Kratochvílová
- 1977: Radislava Šoborová
- 1978: Jarmila Kratochvílová
- 1979: Jarmila Kratochvílová
- 1980: Jarmila Kratochvílová
- 1981: Vera Tylová
- 1982: Taťána Kocembová
- 1983: Taťána Kocembová
- 1984: Taťána Kocembová
- 1985: Emília Danišková
- 1986: Taťána Kocembová
- 1987: Monika Špicková
- 1988: Jana Niková
- 1989: Erika Suchovská
- 1990: Erika Suchovská
- 1991: Monika Špicková
- 1992: Erika Suchovská

=== 400 metres ===
- 1960: Jirina Soldátová
- 1961: Jirina Soldátová
- 1962: Jirina Soldátová
- 1963: Libuše Králícková
- 1964: Anna Chmelková
- 1965: Libuše Eichlerová
- 1966: Anna Chmelková
- 1967: Libuše Macounová
- 1968: Anna Chmelková
- 1969: Anna Chmelková
- 1970: Libuše Macounová
- 1971: Libuše Macounová
- 1972: Vlasta Přikrylová
- 1973: Jozefína Cerchlanová
- 1974: Jozefína Cerchlanová
- 1975: Eva Kovalcíková
- 1976: Jarmila Kratochvílová
- 1977: Eva Ráková
- 1978: Olga Kmochová
- 1979: Olga Kmochová
- 1980: Zuzana Moravcíková
- 1981: Taťána Kocembová
- 1982: Jarmila Kratochvílová
- 1983: Jarmila Kratochvílová
- 1984: Jarmila Kratochvílová
- 1985: Alena Bulírová
- 1986: Jana Mrovcová
- 1987: Alena Paríková
- 1988: Alena Paríková
- 1989: Taťána Kocembová
- 1990: Jana Blažková
- 1991: Nadežda Tomšová
- 1992: Helena Fuchsová

=== 800 metres ===
- 1960: Bedriška Kulhavá
- 1961: Bedriška Kulhavá
- 1962: Dobroslava Žáková
- 1963: Dobroslava Žáková
- 1964: Dobroslava Žáková
- 1965: Dobroslava Žáková
- 1966: Jaroslava Jehličková
- 1967: Emília Ovádková
- 1968: Jaroslava Jehličková
- 1969: Jaroslava Jehličková
- 1970: Marie Otová
- 1971: Jaroslava Jehličková
- 1972: Helena Nerudová
- 1973: Libuše Suchánková
- 1974: Jindriška Hermanská
- 1975: Drahomíra Fuxová
- 1976: Drahomíra Zvonícková
- 1977: Jozefína Cerchlanová
- 1978: Jozefína Cerchlanová
- 1979: Eva Ráková
- 1980: Dagmar Kubálková
- 1981: Zuzana Moravcíková
- 1982: Dagmar Kubálková
- 1983: Dagmar Tesácková
- 1984: Zuzana Moravcíková
- 1985: Jarmila Kratochvílová
- 1986: Petra Pokorná
- 1987: Gabriela Sedláková
- 1988: Gabriela Sedláková
- 1989: Gabriela Sedláková
- 1990: Ivana Kubešová
- 1991: Gabriela Sedláková
- 1992: Helena Fuchsová

=== 1500 metres ===
- 1969: Jaroslava Jehličková
- 1970: Hana Fischerová
- 1971: Jaroslava Jehličková
- 1972: Jaroslava Jehličková
- 1973: Božena Sudická
- 1974: Božena Sudická
- 1975: Božena Sudická
- 1976: Helena Nerudová
- 1977: Božena Sudická
- 1978: Helena Ledvinová
- 1979: Božena Sudická
- 1980: Ludmila Cešková
- 1981: Ludmila Cešková
- 1982: Jana Cervenková
- 1983: Jana Kuceríková
- 1984: Ivana Kubešová
- 1985: Jana Kuceríková
- 1986: Ivana Kubešová
- 1987: Jana Cervenková
- 1988: Vera Nožicková
- 1989: Milena Strnadová
- 1990: Jana Kuceríková
- 1991: Alena Gresáková
- 1992: Vera Kuncická

=== 3000 metres ===
- 1972: Emília Privrelová
- 1973: Nadežda Varcabová
- 1974: Božena Sudická
- 1975: Božena Sudická
- 1976: Miroslava Margoldová
- 1977: Božena Sudická
- 1978: Helena Ledvinová
- 1979: Božena Sudická
- 1980: Božena Vykydalová
- 1981: Jana Cervenková
- 1982: Jarmila Urbanová
- 1983: Ivana Kubešová
- 1984: Ľudmila Melicherová
- 1985: Ľudmila Melicherová
- 1986: Jana Kuceríková
- 1987: Jana Kuceríková
- 1988: Alena Mocáriová
- 1989: Jana Kuceríková
- 1990: Jana Kuceríková
- 1991: Jana Kuceríková
- 1992: Vera Kuncická

=== 10,000 metres ===
- 1984: Ľudmila Melicherová
- 1985: Katarína Stulíková
- 1986: Ľudmila Melicherová
- 1987: Silvia Pajanová
- 1988: Mária Starovská
- 1989: Alena Peterková
- 1990: Alena Mocáriová
- 1991: Alena Peterková
- 1992: Alena Peterková

=== Marathon ===
The 1984 Czechoslovak Marathon Championships was held on a short course, but the winner remained valid.

- 1981: Jarmila Urbanová
- 1982: Vlasta Rulcová
- 1983: Helena Bidmonová
- 1984: Hana Horáková
- 1985: Valja Vankátová
- 1986: Hana Horáková
- 1987: Ivana Môciková
- 1988: Dana Kelnarová
- 1989: Alena Peterková
- 1990: Vlasta Rulcová
- 1991: Mária Starovská
- 1992: Not held

=== 80 metres hurdles ===
- 1960: Alena Stolzová
- 1961: Alena Stolzová
- 1962: Alena Stolzová
- 1963: Alena Stolzová
- 1964: Hana Trejbalová
- 1965: Alena Schusterová
- 1966: Alena Hiltscherová
- 1967: Vlasta Přikrylová
- 1968: Alena Hiltscherová

=== 100 metres hurdles ===
- 1968: Eva Kucmanová
- 1969: Eva Kucmanová
- 1970: Vera Slavicová
- 1971: Vera Slavicová
- 1972: Monika Schönauerová
- 1973: Monika Schönauerová
- 1974: Monika Schönauerová
- 1975: Monika Schönauerová
- 1976: Monika Schönauerová
- 1977: Monika Schönauerová
- 1978: Monika Schönauerová
- 1979: Monika Schönauerová
- 1980: Jitka Kucerová
- 1981: Jirina Procházková
- 1982: Jitka Picková
- 1983: Hana Mužícková
- 1984: Helena Otáhalová
- 1985: Jitka Tesárková
- 1986: Milena Tebichová
- 1987: Milena Tebichová
- 1988: Jana Petríková
- 1989: Blanka Hladká
- 1990: Blanka Hladká
- 1991: Iveta Prellerová
- 1992: Andrea Boklažuková

=== 200 metres hurdles ===
- 1970: Vera Slavicová
- 1971: Vlasta Přikrylová
- 1972: Zdenka Cerná

=== 400 metres hurdles ===
- 1975: Jozefína Hallová
- 1976: Alena Junová
- 1977: Jirina Plívová
- 1978: Hana Slámová
- 1979: Hana Slámová
- 1980: Dana Wildová
- 1981: Sylva Prokopová
- 1982: Anna Filícková
- 1983: Anna Filícková
- 1984: Anna Filícková
- 1985: Eva Eibnerová
- 1986: Blanka Háková
- 1987: Blanka Háková
- 1988: Zuzana Machotková
- 1989: Zuzana Machotková
- 1990: Zuzana Machotková
- 1991: Marcela Novotná
- 1992: Ivana Sekyrová

=== High jump ===
- 1960: Olga Davidová
- 1961: Milada Popková
- 1962: Jana Vítová
- 1963: Ludmila Jetmarová
- 1964: Ludmila Jetmarová
- 1965: Radmila Hušková
- 1966: Mária Faithová
- 1967: Mária Faithová
- 1968: Milena Rezková
- 1969: Milena Rezková
- 1970: Milada Karbanová
- 1971: Alena Prošková
- 1972: Milena Hübnerová
- 1973: Milada Karbanová
- 1974: Milena Hübnerová
- 1975: Mária Mracnová
- 1976: Mária Mracnová
- 1977: Milada Karbanová
- 1978: Milada Karbanová
- 1979: Vera Skotnická
- 1980: Vera Skotnická
- 1981: Yvona Tichopádová
- 1982: Ivana Jobbová
- 1983: Zdenka Boukalová
- 1984: Ivana Jobbová
- 1985: Ivana Jobbová
- 1986: Daniela Chválková
- 1987: Zdenka Svatošová
- 1988: Šárka Kašpárková
- 1989: Šárka Nováková
- 1990: Šárka Nováková
- 1991: Šárka Nováková
- 1992: Jana Brenkusová

=== Long jump ===
- 1960: Vlasta Prikrylová
- 1961: Olga Fomenková
- 1962: Vlasta Prikrylová
- 1963: Vlasta Prikrylová
- 1964: Vlasta Prikrylová
- 1965: Eva Kucmanová
- 1966: Eva Kucmanová
- 1967: Eva Kucmanová
- 1968: Eva Kucmanová
- 1969: Eva Kucmanová
- 1970: Jarmila Nygrýnová
- 1971: Miroslava Brezíková
- 1972: Eva Šuranová
- 1973: Viera Dodrvová
- 1974: Eva Šuranová
- 1975: Eva Šuranová
- 1976: Jarmila Nygrýnová
- 1977: Jarmila Nygrýnová
- 1978: Jarmila Nygrýnová
- 1979: Jarmila Nygrýnová
- 1980: Jarmila Nygrýnová
- 1981: Hana Tasová
- 1982: Ludmila Jimramovská
- 1983: Eva Murková
- 1984: Jarmila Strejcková
- 1985: Eva Murková
- 1986: Eva Murková
- 1987: Eva Murková
- 1988: Vanda Nováková
- 1989: Vanda Nováková
- 1990: Zuzana Valentová
- 1991: Jitka Kubová
- 1992: Šárka Kadlubcová

=== Triple jump ===
- 1990: Dagmar Urbánková
- 1991: Šárka Kadlubcová
- 1992: Šárka Kadlubcová

=== Shot put ===
- 1960: Vera Cerná
- 1961: Vera Matrasová
- 1962: Vera Matrasová
- 1963: Ludmila Jamborová
- 1964: Ludmila Jamborová
- 1965: Ludmila Jamborová
- 1966: Ludmila Duchonová
- 1967: Vladimíra Srbová
- 1968: Marie Stríbrská
- 1969: Vladimíra Srbová
- 1970: Helena Fibingerová
- 1971: Helena Fibingerová
- 1972: Helena Fibingerová
- 1973: Helena Fibingerová
- 1974: Helena Fibingerová
- 1975: Helena Fibingerová
- 1976: Helena Fibingerová
- 1977: Helena Fibingerová
- 1978: Helena Fibingerová
- 1979: Helena Fibingerová
- 1980: Zdenka Bartonová
- 1981: Helena Fibingerová
- 1982: Helena Fibingerová
- 1983: Helena Fibingerová
- 1984: Helena Fibingerová
- 1985: Helena Fibingerová
- 1986: Sona Vašícková
- 1987: Sona Vašícková
- 1988: Sona Vašícková
- 1989: Sona Vašícková
- 1990: Sona Vašícková
- 1991: Sona Vašícková
- 1992: Renata Bruková

=== Discus throw ===
- 1960: Jirina Nemcová
- 1961: Jirina Nemcová
- 1962: Jirina Nemcová
- 1963: Jirina Nemcová
- 1964: Jirina Nemcová
- 1965: Jirina Nemcová
- 1966: Jirina Nemcová
- 1967: Jirina Nemcová
- 1968: Marie Simánková
- 1969: Marie Simánková
- 1970: Marie Simánková
- 1971: Helena Vyhnalová
- 1972: Vladimíra Srbová
- 1973: Marie Novotná
- 1974: Marie Novotná
- 1975: Helena Vyhnalová
- 1976: Jitka Prouzová
- 1977: Helena Vyhnalová
- 1978: Jitka Prouzová
- 1979: Jitka Prouzová
- 1980: Jitka Prouzová
- 1981: Zdenka Bartonová
- 1982: Zdeňka Šilhavá
- 1983: Zdeňka Šilhavá
- 1984: Zdeňka Šilhavá
- 1985: Zdeňka Šilhavá
- 1986: Gabriela Hanuláková
- 1987: Zdeňka Šilhavá
- 1988: Martina Polišenská
- 1989: Martina Polišenská
- 1990: Vladimíra Racková
- 1991: Vladimíra Racková
- 1992: Vladimíra Racková

=== Javelin throw ===
- 1960: Dana Zátopková
- 1961: Klára Kostanecká
- 1962: Anna Linhartová
- 1963: Vlasta Pešková
- 1964: Vlasta Pešková
- 1965: Vlasta Pešková
- 1966: Vlasta Pešková
- 1967: Vlasta Pešková
- 1968: Marie Slováková
- 1969: Vera Antošová
- 1970: Jana Linková
- 1971: Jana Linková
- 1972: Eva Králová
- 1973: Jana Linková
- 1974: Alena Kloubcová
- 1975: Jana Linková
- 1976: Jarmila Segetová
- 1977: Elena Burgárová
- 1978: Mária Laktišová
- 1979: Mária Laktišová
- 1980: Elena Burgárová
- 1981: Elena Burgárová
- 1982: Elena Burgárová
- 1983: Elena Burgárová
- 1984: Elena Burgárová
- 1985: Elena Burgárová
- 1986: Elena Burgárová
- 1987: Elena Révayová
- 1988: Elena Révayová
- 1989: Elena Révayová
- 1990: Beáta Buchalová
- 1991: Elena Révayová
- 1992: Elena Révayová

=== Pentathlon ===
- 1960: Olga Fomenková
- 1961: Olga Fomenková
- 1962: Olga Fomenková
- 1963: Olga Fomenková
- 1964: Vlasta Prikrylová
- 1965: Jitka Potrebuješová
- 1966: Olga Fomenková
- 1967: Eva Kucmanová
- 1968: Jitka Potrebuješová
- 1969: Jitka Potrebuješová
- 1970: Jirina Borešová
- 1971: Miroslava Brezíková
- 1972: Miroslava Brezíková
- 1973: Miroslava Brezíková
- 1974: Vanda Nováková
- 1975: Marcela Koblasová
- 1976: Marcela Koblasová
- 1977: Marcela Koblasová
- 1978: Marcela Koblasová
- 1979: Marcela Koblasová
- 1980: Marcela Koblasová

=== Heptathlon ===
- 1981: Marcela Koblasová
- 1982: Helena Otáhalová
- 1983: Marcela Koblasová
- 1984: Marcela Koblasová
- 1985: Zuzana Lajbnerová
- 1986: Zuzana Lajbnerová
- 1987: Helena Otáhalová
- 1988: Vanda Nováková
- 1989: Marcela Podracká
- 1990: Zuzana Valentová
- 1991: Martina Blažková
- 1992: Marcela Podracká

=== 10 kilometres walk ===
The 1991 women's Czechoslovak Championships race in the 10 km walk was held over a short course, but the winner remained valid.

- 1984: Dana Vavřačová
- 1985: Dana Vavřačová
- 1986: Dana Vavřačová
- 1987: Dana Vavřačová
- 1988: Jana Zárubová
- 1989: Kamila Holpuchová
- 1990: Zuzana Zemková
- 1991: Iveta Brozmanová
- 1992: Zuzana Zemková
