= List of Czechoslovak records in athletics =

The following were the national records in the sport of athletics in Czechoslovakia maintained by the Czechoslovak Athletics Federation until the country's dissolution in 1993.

== Outdoor ==
Key to tables: + = en route to a longer distance
h = hand timing
# = not ratified by federation
Mx = mark was made in a mixed race
OT = oversized track (> 200m in circumference)

=== Men ===
Event	Record	Athlete	Date	Meet	Place	Ref.
100 m	10.25	František Ptáčník	17 June 1985		Fürth, West Germany	
200 m	20.61 (+0.5 m/s)	František Břečka	9 September 1984		Cagliari, Italy	
400 m						
800 m	1:45.4 h	Jozef Plachý	1969			
1000 m						
1500 m	3:34.87	Jan Kubista	20 August 1983		Prague, Czechoslovakia	
Mile	3:52.59	Jozef Plachý	3 July 1978	DN Galan	Stockholm, Sweden	
2000 m	5:01.2 h	Josef Odložil	8 September 1965		Stará Boleslav, Czechoslovakia	
3000 m						
5000 m	13:24.99	Jiří Sýkora	1 August 1980	Olympic Games	Moscow, Soviet Union	
10,000 m	28:04.4 h	Ivan Uvizl	6 August 1986		Prague, Czechoslovakia	
10 km (road)						
15 km (road)	44:42	Ivan Uvizl	15 November 1992		Nijmegen, Netherlands	
20,000 m (track)	59:38.6+	Ivan Uvizl	25 September 1980		Ostrava, Czechoslovakia	
20 km (road)						
One hour	20114.2 m	Ivan Uvizl	25 September 1980		Ostrava, Czechoslovakia	
Half marathon						
25,000 m (track)	1:16:36.4	Emil Zátopek	29 October 1955		Čelákovice, Czechoslovakia	
25 km (road)	1:15:28	Ivan Uvizl	5 May 1991		Berlin, Germany	
30,000 m (track)	1:34:54.2	Pavel Kantorek	31 October 1962		Stará Boleslav, Czechoslovakia	
Marathon						
110 m hurdles	13.48	Jiří Hudec	1 September 1987	World Championships	Rome, Italy	
400 m hurdles	48.94	Jozef Kucej	21 June 1989		Prague, Czechoslovakia	
3000 m steeplechase	8:23.8 h	Dušan Moravčík	17 September 1972		Prague, Czechoslovakia	
High jump	2.36 m	Ján Zvara	23 August 1987		Prague, Czechoslovakia	
Pole vault	5.73 m	Zdeněk Lubenský	13 September 1987		Prague, Czechoslovakia	
Long jump	8.25 m (+1.3 m/s)	Milan Mikuláš	16 July 1988		Prague, Czechoslovakia	
Triple jump	17.53 m (+0.9 m/s)	Milan Mikuláš	17 July 1988		Prague, Czechoslovakia	
Shot put	21.93 m	Remigius Machura	23 August 1987		Prague, Czechoslovakia	
Discus throw	71.26 m	Imrich Bugár	25 May 1985		San Jose, California, United States	
Hammer throw	80.38 m	František Vrbka	18 August 1985		Moscow, Soviet Union	
Javelin throw	90.18 m	Jan Železný	19 September 1992		Tokyo, Japan	
Decathlon	8627	Robert Změlík	31 May 1992		Götzis, Austria	
20,000 m walk (track)						
20 km walk (road)	1:18:13	Pavol Blažek	16 September 1990		Hildesheim, West Germany	
Two hours walk (track)	27310 m +	Ivo Piták	16 March 1986		Prague, Czechoslovakia	
30,000 m walk (track)	2:12:17.0	Ivo Piták	16 March 1986		Prague, Czechoslovakia	
50,000 m walk (track)	3:58:28.1	Ivo Piták	12 October 1985		Prague, Czechoslovakia	
50 km walk (road)	3:42:20	Pavol Szikora	4 April 1987		Dudince, Czechoslovakia	
4 × 100 m relay						
4 × 200 m relay	1:22.42	Sparta Prague; Jiří Mezihorák; Milan Bělošek; Karel Kopeček; Jindřich Roun	28 May 1988		Prague, Czechoslovakia	
4 × 400 m relay						
4 × 800 m relay	7:19.6 h	Czechoslovakia; Petr Bláha; Pavel Pěnkava; Pavel Hruška; Jan Kasal	22 June 1966		London, United Kingdom	
4 × 1500 m relay	15:26.4 h	ÚDA Prague; Duan Čikel; Ivan Ullsperger; Stanislav Jungwirth; Alexander Zvolenský	22 June 1966		London, United Kingdom	

=== Women ===
Event	Record	Athlete	Date	Meet	Place	Ref.
100 m	11.09 (+1.7 m/s)	Jarmila Kratochvílová	6 June 1981		Bratislava, Czechoslovakia	
200 m	21.97 (+1.9 m/s)	Jarmila Kratochvílová	6 June 1981		Bratislava, Czechoslovakia	
300 m	34.95+	Jarmila Kratochvílová	18 August 1982		Zürich, Switzerland	
400 m	47.99	Jarmila Kratochvílová	10 August 1983	World Championships	Helsinki, Finland	
800 m	1:53.28	Jarmila Kratochvílová	26 July 1983		Munich, West Germany	
1000 m						
1500 m	4:01.84	Ivana Walterová	11 August 1986		Budapest, Hungary	
Mile						
2000 m						
3000 m	8:54:61	Jana Kučeríková	11 August 1990		Miskolc, Hungary	
5000 m						
5 km (road)						
10,000 m						
10 km (road)						
15 km (road)						
One hour	16445 m Mx	Vlasta Rulcová	5 September 1981		Mladá Boleslav, Czechoslovakia	
20,000 m (track)						
20 km (road)						
Half marathon						
25 km (road)						
30 km (road)						
Marathon						
100 m hurdles						
400 m hurdles						
3000 m steeplechase						
High jump	1.95 m	Šárka Nováková	30 May 1992		Kerkrade, Netherlands	
Pole vault						
Long jump	7.01 m (−0.2 m/s)	Eva Murková	26 May 1984		Bratislava, Czechoslovakia	
Triple jump						
Shot put	22.32 m	Helena Fibingerová	20 August 1977		Nitra, Czechoslovakia	
Discus throw	74.56 m	Zdeňka Šilhavá	26 August 1984		Nitra, Czechoslovakia	
Hammer throw						
Javelin throw						
Heptathlon	6268	Zuzana Lajbnerová	19 June 1988		Götzis, Austria	
3000 m walk (track)						
5000 m walk (track)						
5 km walk (road)						
10,000 m walk (track)						
10 km walk (road)	46:10	Dana Vavřačová	1 September 1987	World Championships	Rome, Italy	
15 km walk (road)						
20 km walk (road)						
50 km walk (road)						
4 × 100 m relay	42.98	Czechoslovakia; Štěpánka Sokolová; Radislava Šoborová; Taťána Kocembová; Jarmila Kratochvílová	18 August 1982	Weltklasse Zürich	Zürich, Switzerland	
4 × 200 m relay	1:39.9 h	Zbrojovka Brno; Zuzana Glosová; Alena Vozáková; Eva Putnová; Jana Šmerdová	10 September 1968		Brno, Czechoslovakia	
4 × 400 m relay	3:20.32	Czechoslovakia; Taťána Kocembová; Milena Matějkovičová; Zuzana Moravčíková; Jarmila Kratochvílová	14 August 1983	World Championships	Helsinki, Finland	
4 × 800 m relay	9:15.2 h	Slávia VŠ Prague; Ivana Brožová; Věra Mertlíková; Jindřiška Červená; Miluše Hrstková	12 October 1974		Prague, Czechoslovakia	

== Indoor ==
=== Men ===
Event	Record	Athlete	Date	Meet	Place	Ref.
50 m	5.73	František Ptáčník	26 January 1985		Prague, Czechoslovakia	
50 m	5.73	Jiří Valík	10 February 1990		Prague, Czechoslovakia	
60 m	6.58	František Ptáčník	21 February 1987	European Championships	Liévin, France	
200 m						
400 m						
800 m						
1000 m						
1500 m						
Mile	4:01.3 h	Jan Kubista	10 February 1984		Los Angeles, United States	
3000 m	7:48.8 h	Lubomír Tesáček	28 January 1981		Prague, Czechoslovakia	
5000 m	13:39.0 h	Lubomír Tesáček	22 February 1983		Prague, Czechoslovakia	
50 m hurdles	6.41	Igor Kováč	15 February 1992		Prague, Czechoslovakia	
60 m hurdles						
High jump						
Pole vault						
Long jump	8.18 m	Milan Gombala	16 February 1992		Prague, Czechoslovakia	
Triple jump	17.23 m	Ján Čado	2 March 1985	European Championships	Athens, Greece	
Shot put						
Heptathlon						
5000 m walk	18:27.80	Jozef Pribilinec	7 March 1987	World Championships	Indianapolis, United States	
4 × 200 m relay						
4 × 400 m relay						

=== Women ===
Event	Record	Athlete	Date	Meet	Place	Ref.
50 m	6.23	Renata Kubalová	23 February 1991		Prague, Czechoslovakia	
50 m	6.0 h	Tat'ána Kocembová	21 January 1984		Ostrava, Czechoslovakia	
60 m	7.21	Eva Murková	9 February 1985		Jablonec, Czechoslovakia	
200 m	22.76	Jarmila Kratochvílová	28 January 1981		Vienna, Austria	
400 m	49.59	Jarmila Kratochvílová	7 March 1982	European Championships	Milan, Italy	
800 m						
1000 m						
1500 m						
Mile	4:35.83	Ivana Kubešová	2 February 1992		Bordeaux, France	
3000 m						
5000 m						
50 m hurdles	7.00	Blanka Henešová	23 February 1991		Prague, Czechoslovakia	
60 m hurdles						
3000 m steeplechase						
High jump						
Pole vault						
Long jump	6.99 m	Eva Murková	2 March 1985	European Championships	Piraeus, Greece	
Triple jump						
Shot put	22.50 m	Helena Fibingerová	19 February 1977		Jablonec, Czechoslovakia	
Pentathlon						
3000 m walk	12:28.76	Dana Vavřačová	4 March 1990		Glasgow, United Kingdom	
4 × 200 m relay						
4 × 400 m relay						
4 × 800 m relay						
