= Štefan Stanislay =

Slovak high jumper (1902–1986)

Personal information
- Nationality: Slovak
- Born: 12 August 1902 Ladomirová, Austria-Hungary
- Died: 10 July 1986 (aged 83) Prešov, Czechoslovakia
- Height: 180 cm (5 ft 11 in)
- Weight: 75 kg (165 lb)

Sport
- Country: Czechoslovakia
- Sport: Athletics
- Event(s): High jump, Decathlon
- Club: PTVE Prešov
- Coached by: František Pethe, Ján Hajdócy
Medal record
Representing (Czechoslovakia) Czechoslovakia
International Athletics Competition
Gold medal – first place	1929 Budapest	High jump
Representing (Slovakia) Slovak krajina
Czechoslovak Athletics Championships
Gold medal – first place	1926 Brno	High jump
Gold medal – first place	1928 Prague	High jump
Gold medal – first place	1929 Prague	High jump
Gold medal – first place	1930 Brno	High jump
Gold medal – first place	1930 Brno	Decathlon
Bronze medal – third place	1924 Prague	High jump
Bronze medal – third place	1927 Brno	High jump
- Updated on 9 September 2021

Štefan Stanislay (12 August 1902 – 10 July 1986) was a Slovak athlete who competed in the high jump and decathlon. His main rival in the 1920s was Mikuláš Kucsera.

== Biography ==
He was born in Ladomirová near Prešov, after graduating from secondary school at the time of the establishment of Czechoslovakia, he began to practice athletics.

He joined the PTVE Prešov club, and in addition to high jump under the leadership of coach František Pethe, he trained decathlon, in which he became the Czechoslovak champion in 1930. But he achieved his greatest success in the high jump, becoming the four-time champion of Czechoslovakia, and the winner of four international high jump tournaments.

In 1929 he was the first Czechoslovak athlete to cross the 190 cm in high jump. He achieved this performance at the international athletics race in Budapest, Hungary on August 10, 1929, but according to the then rules of the Czechoslovak Amateur Athletic Union, the record set at the race abroad could not be officially recognized as a national record.

Štefan Stanislay was a potential Olympian representing Czechoslovakia at the three Summer Olympics. In the qualification before the Paris 1924 he failed, before Amsterdam 1928 excluded him from training a serious injury to the bouncing leg, and before the Games in the Los Angeles 1932, he was no longer able to get into the top sporting form.

== International competitions ==
International athletics competition

- 1929 Budapest: (gold) (High jump, 190 cm PB)

== National titles ==
Czechoslovak Athletics Championships

- 1926 Brno: (gold) (High jump, 175 cm)
- 1928 Prague: (gold) (High jump, 180 cm)
- 1929 Prague: (gold) (High jump, 188 cm NR)
- 1930 Brno: (gold) (High jump, 180 cm)
- 1930 Brno: (gold) (Decathlon)
