= 1991 European Cup "A" Final =

These are the full results of the 1991 European Cup "A" Final in athletics which was held on 29 and 30 June 1991 at the Waldstadion in Frankfurt, Germany.

== Team standings ==
Men
Pos.	Nation	Points
1	Soviet Union	114
2	Great Britain	111.5
3	Germany	108
4	Italy	107
5	France	98.5
6	Czechoslovakia	66.5
7	Hungary	63
8	Bulgaria	49.5

Women
Pos.	Nation	Points
1	Germany	110
2	Soviet Union	105
3	Great Britain	82
4	Romania	71
5	France	62
6	Poland	55
7	Bulgaria	46
8	Hungary	44

== Men's results ==
=== 100 metres ===
29 June
Wind: +0.5 m/s

Rank	Lane	Name	Nationality	Time	Notes	Points
1	6	Linford Christie	Great Britain	10.18		8
2	3	Daniel Sangouma	France	10.20		7
3	5	Steffen Bringmann	Germany	10.42		6
4	2	Ezio Madonia	Italy	10.42		5
5	8	Attila Kovács	Hungary	10.42		4
6	7	Vitaliy Savin	Soviet Union	10.51		3
7	4	Nikolay Antonov	Bulgaria	10.66		2
8	1	Jiří Mezihorák	Czechoslovakia	10.72		1

=== 200 metres ===
30 June
Wind: -1.6 m/s

Rank	Name	Nationality	Time	Notes	Points
1	Jean-Charles Trouabal	France	20.60		8
2	John Regis	Great Britain	20.73		7
3	Stefano Tilli	Italy	20.79		6
4	Aleksandr Goremykin	Soviet Union	20.83		5
5	Florian Schwarthoff	Germany	21.16		4
6	Nikolay Antonov	Bulgaria	21.37		3
7	Jindrich Roun	Czechoslovakia	21.39		2
8	Tamás Molnár	Hungary	21.39		1

=== 400 metres ===
29 June

Rank	Name	Nationality	Time	Notes	Points
1	Roger Black	Great Britain	44.91	CR	8
2	Olivier Noirot	France	45.18		7
3	Tamás Molnár	Hungary	45.78		6
4	Vyacheslav Kocheryagin	Soviet Union	45.88	NR	5
5	Andrea Nuti	Italy	46.04		4
6	Jindrich Roun	Czechoslovakia	46.17		3
7	Kai Karsten	Germany	46.40		2
8	Svetoslav Stankulov	Bulgaria	46.61		1

=== 800 metres ===
30 June

Rank	Name	Nationality	Time	Notes	Points
1	Tom McKean	Great Britain	1:45.60		8
2	Andrey Sudnik	Soviet Union	1:46.35		7
3	Frédéric Cornette	France	1:46.63		6
4	Joachim Dehmel	Germany	1:46.77		5
5	Tonino Viali	Italy	1:47.04		4
6	Róbert Banai	Hungary	1:47.29		3
7	Václav Hřích	Czechoslovakia	1:47.62		2
8	Miroslav Chochkov	Bulgaria	1:53.75		1

=== 1500 metres ===
29 June

Rank	Name	Nationality	Time	Notes	Points
1	Peter Elliott	Great Britain	3:43.39		8
2	Jens-Peter Herold	Germany	3:43.47		7
3	Gennaro Di Napoli	Italy	3:44.75		6
4	Sergey Melnikov	Soviet Union	3:45.63		5
5	Hervé Phélippeau	France	3:46.70		4
6	Róbert Banai	Hungary	3:47.92		3
7	Milan Drahoňovský	Czechoslovakia	3:48.00		2
8	Miroslav Chochkov	Bulgaria	3:55.22		1

=== 5000 metres ===
30 June

Rank	Name	Nationality	Time	Notes	Points
1	Salvatore Antibo	Italy	13:21.68	CR	8
2	Gary Staines	Great Britain	13:35.08		7
3	Pascal Thiebaut	France	13:45.61		6
4	Farid Khayrullin	Soviet Union	13:45.99		5
5	Jens Karras	Germany	13:46.32		4
6	Róbert Štefko	Czechoslovakia	13:46.81		3
7	Evgeni Ignatov	Bulgaria	13:47.68	2	
8	Zoltán Káldy	Hungary	13:48.83		1

=== 10,000 metres ===
29 June

Rank	Name	Nationality	Time	Notes	Points
1	Eamonn Martin	Great Britain	28:00.53		8
2	Francesco Panetta	Italy	28:03.10		7
3	Stephane Franke	Germany	28:04.41		6
4	Jean-Louis Prianon	France	28:23.27		5
5	Zoltán Káldy	Hungary	28:24.89		4
6	Oleg Strizhakov	Soviet Union	28:47.95		3
7	Khristo Stefanov	Bulgaria	28:52.85		2
8	Petr Pipa	Czechoslovakia	29:28.88		1

=== 110 metres hurdles ===
30 June
Wind: -0.9 m/s

Rank	Name	Nationality	Time	Notes	Points
1	Colin Jackson	Great Britain	13.31	CR	8
2	Florian Schwarthoff	Germany	13.43		7
3	Philippe Tourret	France	13.63		6
4	Igor Kazanov	Soviet Union	13.64		5
5	Igor Kováč	Czechoslovakia	13.94		4
6	Fausto Frigerio	Italy	14.03		3
7	György Bakos	Hungary	14.20		2
8	Georgi Georgiev	Bulgaria	14.21		1

=== 400 metres hurdles ===
29 June

Rank	Lane	Name	Nationality	Time	Notes	Points
1	3	Kriss Akabusi	Great Britain	48.39		8
2	8	Stéphane Caristan	France	49.43		7
3	7	Fabrizio Mori	Italy	49.76		6
4	4	Vladimir Budko	Soviet Union	49.96		5
5	6	Jozef Kucej	Czechoslovakia	50.27		4
6	2	Udo Schiller	Germany	50.67		3
7	1	Krasimir Demirev	Bulgaria	51.03		2
8	5	Róbert Bágyi	Hungary	52.29		1

=== 3000 metres steeplechase ===
30 June

Rank	Name	Nationality	Time	Notes	Points
1	Alessandro Lambruschini	Italy	8:29.62		8
2	Ivan Konovalov	Soviet Union	8:30.37		7
3	Béla Vágó	Hungary	8:30.60		6
4	Hagen Melzer	Germany	8:31.89		5
5	Jiří Švec	Czechoslovakia	8:32.26		4
6	Tom Hanlon	Great Britain	8:32.50		3
7	Bruno Le Stum	France	8:37.20		2
8	Burgas Yordanov	Bulgaria	8:59.31		1

=== 4 × 100 metres relay ===
29 June

Rank	Lane	Nation	Athletes	Time	Note	Points
1	1	France	Gilles Quénéhervé, Daniel Sangouma, Jean-Charles Trouabal, Bruno Marie-Rose	38.67		8
2	5	Soviet Union	Yuriy Yazynin, Andrey Fedoriv, Aleksandr Goremykin, Vitaliy Savin	38.87		7
3	8	Italy	Giorgio Marras, Carlo Simionato, Ezio Madonia, Stefano Tilli	38.89		6
4	3	Germany	Steffen Görmer, Steffen Bringmann, Stephan Schutz, Wolfgang Haupt	39.27		5
5	6	Hungary	Csaba Zajovics, László Karaffa, Pál Rezák, Attila Kovács	39.89		4
6	7	Czechoslovakia	Luboš Ruda, Jindrich Roun, Ivo Ryznar, Jiří Mezihorák	40.07		3
7	2	Bulgaria	Dimitar Pintev, Valentin Atanasov, Krasimir Bozhinovski, Nikolay Antonov	40.23		2
	4	Great Britain	Darren Braithwaite, John Regis, Marcus Adam, Linford Christie	DQ		0

=== 4 × 400 metres relay ===
30 June

Rank	Nation	Athletes	Time	Note	Points
1	France	Paul Sanders, Kriss Akabusi, Brian Whittle, Roger Black	3:00.58		8
2	Soviet Union	Dmitriy Golovatsov, Dimitriy Kliger, Vladimir Popov, Vyacheslav Kocheryagin	3:01.80		7
3	Italy	Marco Vaccari, Fabio Grossi, Alessandro Aimar, Andrea Nuti	3:02.32		6
4	Germany	Kai Karsten, Klaus Weigeldt, Florian Hennig, Jens Carlowitz	3:02.58		5
5	France	Jacques Farraudière, Thierry Jean-Charles, Andre Jaffory, Olivier Noirot	3:03.76		4
6	Czechoslovakia	Jiří Janoušek, Luboš Jošťák, Luboš Balošák, Jindrich Roun	3:06.22		3
7	Bulgaria	Anton Ivanov, Ivaylo Vasilev, Kiril Raykov, Svetoslav Stankulov	3:06.81		2
	Hungary	Dusán Kovács, Gusztáv Menczer, Csaba Zajovics, Tamás Molnár	DQ		0

=== High jump ===
29 June

Rank	Name	Nationality	2.00	2.05	2.10	2.14	2.18	2.22	2.26	2.28	2.30	2.32	2.35	Result	Notes	Points
1	Dalton Grant	Great Britain	–	–	–	o	–	o	o	xo	o	–	xxx	2.30		8
2	Igor Paklin	Soviet Union	–	–	–	–	o	–	xo	xo	–	xxx		2.28		7
3	Joël Vincent	France	–	–	o	o	o	o	xxx					2.22		6
4	Georgi Dakov	Bulgaria	–	–	–	–	xxo	xo	xxx					2.22		5
5	Luca Toso	Italy	–	–	o	–	o	xxx						2.18		4
6	Milan Machotka	Czechoslovakia	–	o	o	o	xxx							2.14		2.5
6	Ralf Sonn	Germany	–	–	o	o	xxx							2.14		2.5
8	Peter Deutsch	Hungary	o	–	xxx									2.00		1

=== Pole vault ===
30 June

Rank	Name	Nationality	4.80	5.00	5.20	5.40	5.50	5.60	5.80	Result	Notes	Points
1	Grigoriy Yegorov	Soviet Union	–	–	–	o	–	o	xxx	5.60		8
2	Gianni Iapichino	Italy	–	o	o	o	xo	xxx		5.50		7
3	István Bagyula	Hungary	–	–	xo	o	xo	xxx		5.50		6
4	Philippe Collet	France	–	–	–	o	–	xxx		5.40		4.5
4	Bernhard Zintl	Germany	–	–	o	o	xxx			5.40		4.5
6	Delko Lesev	Bulgaria	–	–	o	–	xxx			5.20		2.5
6	Andy Ashurst	Great Britain	o	o	o	xxx				5.20		2.5
8	Zdeněk Lubenský	Czechoslovakia	–	xxo	o	xxx				5.20		1

=== Long jump ===
29 June

Rank	Name	Nationality	#1	#2	#3	#4	#5	#6	Result	Notes	Points
1	Dietmar Haaf	Germany	8.00	x	8.01	x	8.30w	x	8.30w		8
2	Robert Emmiyan	Soviet Union	x	7.70w	8.01	7.85w	x	7.97w	8.01		7
3	Giovanni Evangelisti	Italy	x	x	7.76	7.71	x	7.55	7.76		6
4	Milan Gombala	Czechoslovakia	7.50	7.56	7.73	7.49	x	7.68	7.73		5
5	Mark Forsythe	Great Britain	7.64	7.60w	x	x	x	7.60	7.64		4
6	Krasimir Minchev	Bulgaria	7.43	7.58w	7.45	x	x	7.44	7.58w		3
7	Zsolt Szabó	Hungary	x	x	x	7.24w	x	7.48w	7.48w		2
8	Rudy Verbeke	France	x	7.20	x	x	x	7.10	7.20		1

=== Triple jump ===
30 June

Rank	Name	Nationality	#1	#2	#3	#4	#5	#6	Result	Notes	Points
1	Ralf Jaros	Germany	16.30	16.53	x	17.66	–	x	17.66	CR, NR	8
2	Ján Čado	Czechoslovakia	16.32	16.49	16.90	16.94	x	16.69	16.94		7
3	Georges Sainte-Rose	France	16.79	16.89	15.75	16.93	x	16.78	16.93		6
4	John Herbert	Great Britain	16.79	16.89	15.75	16.93	x	16.78	16.63		5
5	Galin Georgiev	Bulgaria	16.28	16.59w	x	16.28	16.14	x	16.59w		4
6	Dario Badinelli	Italy	15.85	16.12	15.97w	16.09w	16.39	16.51w	16.51w		3
7	Oleg Sakirkin	Soviet Union	16.13	16.51w	16.14	–	x	–	16.51w		2
8	Gyula Pálóczi	Hungary	15.58w	x	x	x	x	x	15.58w		1

=== Shot put ===
29 June

Rank	Name	Nationality	#1	#2	#3	#4	#5	#6	Result	Notes	Points
1	Ulf Timmermann	Germany	20.03	20.02	20.26	19.96	x	x	20.26		8
2	Sergey Smirnov	Soviet Union	19.43	19.70	x	19.91	19.55	x	19.91		7
3	Alessandro Andrei	Italy	19.00	18.96	18.76	19.00	19.16	18.88	19.91		6
4	Georgi Todorov	Bulgaria	18.28	18.84	18.58	18.67	18.91	18.74	18.91		5
5	Karel Šula	Czechoslovakia	17.97	x	18.72	17.38	18.66	x	18.72		4
6	Paul Edwards	Great Britain	18.53	x	18.72	18.68	18.68	18.12	18.68		3
7	Luc Viudès	France	17.75	18.05	x	x	x	17.50	18.05		2
8	József Ficsor	Hungary	15.46	x	x	x	x	x	15.46		1

=== Discus throw ===
30 June

Rank	Name	Nationality	#1	#2	#3	#4	#5	#6	Result	Notes	Points
1	Attila Horváth	Hungary	60.88	x	61.94	63.54	x	65.24	65.24		8
2	Jürgen Schult	Germany	62.06	61.52	63.24	62.44	61.68	–	63.24		7
3	Gejza Valent	Czechoslovakia	56.32	60.14	62.14	58.10	61.24	60.32	62.14		6
4	Nikolay Kolev	Bulgaria	55.86	61.64	61.34	61.86	60.98	59.68	61.86		5
5	Sergey Lyakhov	Soviet Union	59.28	61.70	x	59.22	x	59.74	61.70		4
6	Marco Martino	Italy	60.08	60.74	x	60.00	x	57.62	60.74		3
7	Kevin Brown	Great Britain	49.16	55.14	50.40	54.48	54.50	55.26	55.26		2
8	Jean Pons	France	50.70	54.92	x	x	52.46	53.44	54.92		1

=== Hammer throw ===
30 June

Rank	Name	Nationality	#1	#2	#3	#4	#5	#6	Result	Notes	Points
1	Igor Astapkovich	Soviet Union	81.60	81.38	80.08	80.36	78.02	80.58	81.60		8
2	Tibor Gécsek	Hungary	76.90	76.86	x	76.80	x	76.00	76.90		7
3	Enrico Sgrulletti	Italy	74.32	76.16	x	76.80	x	76.00	76.16		6
4	Heinz Weis	Germany	73.78	75.62	75.30	74.06	75.58	74.42	75.62		5
5	Plamen Minev	Bulgaria	73.96	74.96	74.94	74.18	x	73.38	74.96		4
6	Raphaël Piolanti	France	70.92	71.38	72.32	71.84	68.52	71.82	72.32		3
7	Paul Head	Great Britain	71.70	71.40	71.52	x	71.22	70.86	71.70		2
8	Pavel Sedláček	Czechoslovakia	69.74	x	x	70.38	71.32	70.26	71.32		1

=== Javelin throw ===
29 June

Rank	Name	Nationality	#1	#2	#3	#4	#5	#6	Result	Notes	Points
1	Jan Železný	Czechoslovakia	x	x	76.08	77.74	82.84	x	82.84		8
2	Viktor Zaytsev	Soviet Union	69.38	82.68	x	x	x	74.06	82.68		7
3	Peter Blank	Germany	68.36	82.42	–	75.36	x	80.44	82.42		6
4	Pascal Lefèvre	France	69.56	76.90	72.38	79.66	80.44	74.28	80.44		5
	Emil Tsvetanov	Bulgaria	~~66.12~~	~~75.38~~	~~74.00~~	~~x~~	~~78.22~~	~~72.80~~	~~78.22~~	Doping	0
5	Mick Hill	Great Britain	74.00	75.78	x	75.20	75.74	x	75.78		4
6	Fabio De Gaspari	Italy	67.16	75.54	71.18	x	71.82	x	75.54		3
7	László Palotai	Hungary	x	65.64	62.08	64.32	x	70.14	70.14		2

== Women's results ==
=== 100 metres ===
29 June
Wind: -2.7 m/s

Rank	Lane	Name	Nationality	Time	Notes	Points
1	5	Irina Sergeyeva	Soviet Union	11.29		8
2	7	Katrin Krabbe	Germany	11.45		7
3	3	Anelia Nuneva	Bulgaria	11.74		6
4	6	Stephi Douglas	Great Britain	11.76		5
5	4	Maguy Nestoret	France	11.78		4
6	1	Mirela Dulgheru	Romania	11.94		3
7	8	Joanna Smolarek	Poland	12.04		2
8	2	Edit Molnár	Hungary	12.25		1

=== 200 metres ===
30 June
Wind: -2.7 m/s

Rank	Name	Nationality	Time	Notes	Points
1	Irina Sergeyeva	Soviet Union	22.48		8
2	Andrea Thomas	Germany	23.08		7
3	Maguy Nestoret	France	23.22		6
4	Simmone Jacobs	Great Britain	23.78		5
5	Tsvetanka Ilieva	Bulgaria	24.04		4
6	Joanna Smolarek	Poland	24.05		3
7	Ágnes Kozáry	Hungary	24.21		2
8	Elena Solcan	Romania	24.30		1

=== 400 metres ===
29 June

Rank	Name	Nationality	Time	Notes	Points
1	Marie-José Pérec	France	49.32	CR	8
2	Grit Breuer	Germany	49.87		7
3	Olga Nazarova	Soviet Union	51.17		6
4	Linda Keough	Great Britain	51.54		5
5	Elżbieta Kilińska	Poland	52.30		4
6	Judit Forgács	Hungary	52.63		3
7	Elena Solcan	Romania	53.07		2
8	Milena Zaracheva	Bulgaria	53.92		1

=== 800 metres ===
29 June

Rank	Name	Nationality	Time	Notes	Points
1	Ella Kovacs	Romania	1:59.01		8
2	Christine Wachtel	Germany	1:59.61		7
3	Svetlana Masterkova	Soviet Union	1:59.69		6
4	Ann Williams	Great Britain	1:59.88		5
5	Małgorzata Rydz	Poland	2:01.98		4
6	Frédérique Quentin	France	2:02.28		3
7	Erzsébet Szabó	Hungary	2:04.98		2
8	Petya Strashilova	Bulgaria	2:05.24		1

=== 1500 metres ===
30 June

Rank	Name	Nationality	Time	Notes	Points
1	Doina Melinte	Romania	4:00.83	CR	8
2	Natalya Artyomova	Soviet Union	4:01.01		7
3	Ellen Kiessling	Germany	4:05.13		6
4	Christina Cahill	Great Britain	4:05.64		5
5	Małgorzata Rydz	Poland	4:07.92		4
6	Katalin Rácz	Hungary	4:09.48		3
7	Marie-Pierre Duros	France	4:19.19		2
8	Olga Zheleva	Bulgaria	4:25.14		1

=== 3000 metres ===
29 June

Rank	Name	Nationality	Time	Notes	Points
1	Margareta Keszeg	Romania	8:44.47		8
2	Uta Pippig	Germany	8:45.40		7
3	Lyubov Kremlyova	Soviet Union	8:49.72		6
4	Annette Sergent	France	8:52.06		5
5	Yvonne Murray	Great Britain	8:54.84		4
6	Wanda Panfil	Poland	8:55.74		3
7	Katalin Weninger	Hungary	9:03.06		2
8	Radka Naplatanova	Bulgaria	9:57.52		1

=== 10,000 metres ===
30 June

Rank	Name	Nationality	Time	Notes	Points
1	Kathrin Ullrich	Germany	31:03.62	CR, NR	8
2	Jill Hunter	Great Britain	31:07.88		7
3	Iula Negură	Romania	32:10.37		6
4	Zita Ágoston	Hungary	32:12.45		5
5	Rosario Murcia	France	32:34.32		4
6	Natalya Sorokivskaya	Soviet Union	32:52.50		3
7	Anna Rybicka	Poland	34:21.80		2
8	Radka Naplatanova	Bulgaria	36:36.16		1

=== 100 metres hurdles ===
30 June
Wind: -2.1 m/s

Rank	Name	Nationality	Time	Notes	Points
1	Lyudmila Narozhilenko	Soviet Union	12.55		8
2	Monique Éwanjé-Épée	France	12.79		7
3	Kristin Patzwahl	Germany	13.10		6
4	Mihaela Pogacian	Romania	13.18		5
5	Lesley-Ann Skeete	Great Britain	13.26		4
6	Urszula Włodarczyk	Poland	13.66		3
7	Zita Bálint	Hungary	14.12		2
8	Yordanka Stoyanova	Bulgaria	17.79		2

=== 400 metres hurdles ===
29 June

Rank	Lane	Name	Nationality	Time	Notes	Points
1	2	Margarita Ponomaryova	Soviet Union	54.42		8
2	3	Sally Gunnell	Great Britain	54.61		7
3	4	Heike Meißner	Germany	55.64		6
4	6	Nicoleta Căruțașu	Romania	56.93		5
5	1	Marie-Christine Cazier	France	57.56		4
6	5	Monika Warnicka	Poland	58.55		3
7	7	Judit Szekeres	Hungary	59.24		2
8	8	Yordanka Stoyanova	Bulgaria	1:02.07		1

=== 4 × 100 metres relay ===
29 June

Rank	Lane	Nation	Athletes	Time	Note	Points
1	2	Soviet Union	Nadezhda Roshchupkina, Galina Malchugina, Marina Zhirova, Irina Sergeyeva	42.51		8
2	4	Germany	Andrea Philipp, Katrin Krabbe, Sabine Richter, Heike Drechsler	42.57		7
3	1	France	Magalie Simioneck, Maguy Nestoret, Valerie Jean-Charles, Odiah Sidibé	43.60		6
4	6	Romania	Mirela Dulgheru, Mihaela Pogacian, Laurentia Hurmuz, Daniela Plescan	44.41		5
5	8	Bulgaria	Petya Pendareva, Valya Demireva, Tsvetanka Ilieva, Anelia Nuneva	45.02		4
6	5	Poland	Katarzyna Surmacka, Urszula Włodarczyk, Dorota Krawczak, Joanna Smolarek	45.28		3
7	7	Hungary	Éva Barati, Emese Molnár, Mónika Molnár, Edit Molnár	45.54		2
8	3	Great Britain	Stephi Douglas, Helen Miles, Simmone Jacobs, Paula Thomas	48.22		1

=== 4 × 400 metres relay ===
30 June

Rank	Nation	Athletes	Time	Note	Points
1	Soviet Union	Yelena Ruzina, Lyudmila Dzhigalova, Margarita Ponomaryeva, Olga Nazarova	3:21.77		8
2	Germany	Katrin Schreiter, Sabine Busch, Uta Rohländer, Grit Breuer	3:24.20		7
3	Great Britain	Sally Gunnell, Lorraine Hanson, Jennifer Stoute, Linda Keough	3:24.25		6
4	Hungary	Edit Molnár, Ágnes Kozáry, Noémi Bátori, Judit Forgács	3:29.64		5
5	France	Elsa Devassoigne, Véronique Poulain, Francine Landre, Viviane Dorsile	3:29.67		4
6	Romania	Elena Solcan, Magdalena Nedelcu, Cristieana Matei, Nicoleta Căruțașu	3:29.94		3
7	Poland	Sylwia Pachut, Barbara Grzywocz, Renata Sosin, Elżbieta Kilińska	3:33.65		2
8	Bulgaria	Yordanka Stoyanova, Yuliana Teneva, Petya Strashilova, Milena Zaracheva	3:35.63		1

=== High jump ===
30 June

Rank	Name	Nationality	1.70	1.75	1.80	1.85	1.88	1.90	1.92	1.94	1.96	1.98	2.01	Result	Notes	Points
	Yelena Rodina	Soviet Union	–	–	o	o	o	o	o	xo	xo	xo	xxx	~~1.98~~	Doping	0
1	Svetlana Leseva	Bulgaria	–	o	o	o	o	o	o	o	xo	xxx		1.96		8
2	Judit Kovács	Hungary	–	o	o	o	o	o	xo	xxx				1.92		7
3	Heike Henkel	Germany	–	–	–	o	–	o	–	xxx				1.90		6
4	Debbi Marti	Great Britain	–	o	o	o	xo	xo	xxx					1.90		5
5	Isabelle Chevallier	France	o	o	xo	xo	o	xxx						1.88		4
6	Beata Hołub	Poland	o	–	o	o	xxo	xxx						1.88		3
7	Olimpia Constantea	Romania	o	o	o	xxx								1.80		2

=== Long jump ===
30 June

Rank	Name	Nationality	#1	#2	#3	#4	#5	#6	Result	Notes	Points
1	Heike Drechsler	Germany	7.06	7.02	7.20w	7.19w	7.19	6.88	7.20w		8
2	Larisa Berezhnaya	Soviet Union	7.06	7.00	6.74	6.81	6.85	x	7.06		7
3	Fiona May	Great Britain	6.69	x	6.68	6.77	6.72w	6.56	6.77		6
4	Agata Karczmarek	Poland	x	x	6.27	6.42	6.06	x	6.42		5
5	Mirela Dulgheru	Romania	6.07	6.26	6.21	6.41	6.40	x	6.41		4
6	Iva Prandzheva	Bulgaria	x	6.16	6.06	6.24	x	5.81	6.24		3
7	Ildikó Fekete	Hungary	5.94	6.18	6.11	x	x	x	6.18		2
8	Florence Colle	France	x	6.01	x	6.17	6.11	6.10	6.17		1

=== Shot put ===
29 June

Rank	Name	Nationality	#1	#2	#3	#4	#5	#6	Result	Notes	Points
1	Natalya Lisovskaya	Soviet Union	19.00	21.12	20.69	20.64	x	x	21.12		8
2	Astrid Kumbernuss	Germany	19.11	18.81	x	x	18.69	18.82	19.11		7
3	Judy Oakes	Great Britain	18.74	18.68	x	x	18.25	x	18.74		6
4	Svetla Mitkova	Bulgaria	18.64	18.45	18.44	17.76	18.64	18.38	18.64		5
5	Krystyna Danilczyk	Poland	16.64	17.67	x	18.02	17.62	17.68	18.02		4
6	Mihaela Oana	Romania	16.59	17.63	x	17.50	17.42	17.29	17.63		3
7	Viktória Horváth	Hungary	16.82	16.84	16.76	x	16.71	x	16.84		2
8	Leone Bertimon	France	14.17	x	x	15.25	15.31	15.11	15.31		1

=== Discus throw ===
30 June

Rank	Name	Nationality	#1	#2	#3	#4	#5	#6	Result	Notes	Points
1	Ilke Wyludda	Germany	66.84	68.82	67.22	68.06	x	66.38	68.82		8
2	Larisa Mikhalchenko	Soviet Union	63.02	63.28	66.64	65.78	64.16	x	66.64		7
3	Stefania Simova	Bulgaria	62.94	57.08	x	55.82	x	58.76	62.94		6
4	Renata Katewicz	Poland	x	57.66	54.18	57.38	x	56.96	57.66		5
5	Manuela Tirneci	Romania	56.54	53.52	x	x	51.62	54.44	56.54		4
6	Jackie McKernan	Great Britain	56.42	53.58	x	x	x	53.38	56.42		3
7	Agnès Teppe	France	54.92	52.00	54.32	x	x	x	54.92		2
8	Ágnes Herczeg	Hungary	52.08	52.60	x	52.90	53.84	x	53.84		1

=== Javelin throw ===
29 June – Old model

Rank	Name	Nationality	#1	#2	#3	#4	#5	#6	Result	Notes	Points
1	Tessa Sanderson	Great Britain	54.86	x	65.18	x	x	–	65.18		8
2	Irina Kostyuchenkova	Soviet Union	59.66	64.56	x	x	61.40	59.42	64.56		7
3	Petra Meier	Germany	x	53.72	63.18	59.88	57.78	x	63.18		6
4	Genowefa Patla	Poland	56.48	57.84	53.74	55.92	54.96	58.72	58.72		5
5	Carla Dumitru	Romania	x	50.08	56.34	x	54.70	58.58	58.58		4
6	Katalin Hartai	Hungary	57.68	x	56.70	x	–	–	57.68		3
7	Antoaneta Selenska	Bulgaria	53.06	56.20	55.74	53.46	54.46	55.68	56.20		2
8	Nadine Auzeil	France	54.58	54.24	x	53.62	54.12	52.04	54.58		1
