= Mikuláš Kucsera =

Slovak high jumper

Personal information
- Nationality: Slovak
- Born: 10 June 1902 Budapest, Austria-Hungary
- Died: 28 May 1987 (aged 84) Bratislava, Czechoslovakia
- Height: 185 cm (6 ft 1 in)
- Weight: 72 kg (159 lb)

Sport
- Country: Czechoslovakia
- Sport: Athletics
- Event: High jump
- Club: PTE Bratislava, 1.ČsŠK Bratislava
- Coached by: Ján Hajdócy
Medal record
Representing (Slovakia) Slovak krajina
Czechoslovak Athletics Championships
Gold medal – first place	1922 Prague	High jump
Gold medal – first place	1924 Prague	High jump
- Updated on 9 September 2023

Mikuláš Kucsera (10 June 1902 – 28 May 1987) was a Slovak athlete. He competed in the men's high jump at the 1924 Summer Olympics. His main rival in the 1920s was Štefan Stanislay. He was the first Slovak high jumper at the olympics.

== Biography ==
=== Sports career ===
At the 1924 Summer Olympics in Paris, the high jumper Mikuláš Kucsera from Bratislava was among the four Slovaks. A native of Budapest, member of the 1. ČSŠK Bratislava, national champion in 1922 and 1924. In the French capital, he did not capitalize on his previous good form, jumped only 175 cm and did not advance from the qualification. At the same time, this athlete, who transferred to the 1. ČSŠK from PTE Bratislava, previously "swinged" several times over the bar at a height of 185 cm.

== International competitions ==
Year	Competition	Venue	Position	Event	Notes
1924	Olympic Games	(France) Paris	Qual.	High jump	1.73 m

== National titles ==
Czechoslovak Athletics Championships

- 1922 Prague: (gold) (High jump, 175 cm)
- 1924 Prague: (gold) (High jump, 180 cm)

== Personal bests ==
- High jump – 186 cm (1923)
