= Athletics at the 1987 Summer Universiade – Women's heptathlon =

The women's heptathlon event at the 1987 Summer Universiade was held at the Stadion Maksimir in Zagreb on 13 and 14 July 1987.

== Results ==
Rank	Athlete	Nationality	100m H	HJ	SP	200m	LJ	JT	800m	Points	Notes
1st place, gold medalist(s)	Liliana Năstase	Romania	13.10	1.77	13.90	24.12	6.39	40.58	2:13.90	6364	
2nd place, silver medalist(s)	Yelena Davydova	Soviet Union	14.33	1.89	12.77	25.07	6.37	47.14	2:15.56	6272	
3rd place, bronze medalist(s)	Zuzana Lajbnerová	Czechoslovakia	14.02	1.89	14.44	25.14	6.10	41.02	2:15.11	6224	
4	Bettina Beinhauer	West Germany	13.85	1.65	13.50	25.11	5.69	47.52	2:13.76	5911	
5	Wendy Brown	United States	13.18	1.80	12.25	25.04	6.11	43.96	2:28.50	5830	
6	Małgorzata Nowak	Poland	14.17	1.77	14.35	25.51	5.58	38.66	2:27.13	5760	
7	Yelena Babikova	Soviet Union	14.49w	1.80	12.90	26.03	5.88	38.78	2:15.22	5751	
8	Marina Mihailova	Yugoslavia	14.43	1.71	11.70	25.58	5.97	41.08	2:19.09	5624	
9	Linda Spenst	Canada	14.06	1.71	10.51	25.54	5.97	38.56	2:16.60	5588	
10	Yang Quifen	China	14.59	1.74	11.50	25.34	5.65	35.06	2:25.59	5350	
11	Vladka Lopatič	Yugoslavia	14.64	1.74	10.81	25.26	5.33	35.68	2:20.06	5298	
12	Minako Isogai	Japan	15.03	1.74	9.65	25.29	5.91	35.46	2:25.17	5265	
13	Susana Cruz	Spain								4868	
14	Emilia Lenk	Mexico								4743	
15	Esther Suter	Switzerland	14.07						DNF	4671	
16	Daisy Zereceda	Peru								4243	
17	Deborah de Souza	Peru								4224	
18	Larissa Soto	Guatemala								4153	
	Jolanda Jones	United States								DNF	
	Claudia del Fabbro	Italy								DNF	
	Alison Armstrong	Canada								DNF	
