= Athletics at the 1991 Summer Universiade – Men's 800 metres =

The men's 800 metres event at the 1991 Summer Universiade was held at the Don Valley Stadium in Sheffield on 20, 21 and 22 July 1991.

== Medalists ==
Gold	Silver	Bronze
Giuseppe D'Urso; Italy	Curtis Robb; Great Britain; Dean Kenneally; Australia	

== Results ==
=== Heats ===
Rank	Heat	Athlete	Nationality	Time	Notes
1	4	Terril Davis	United States	1:48.78	Q
2	4	Pavel Soukup	Czechoslovakia	1:50.14	Q
3	6	Andrew Lill	Great Britain	1:50.14	Q
4	1	Tommy Asinga	Suriname	1:50.17	Q
5	1	Ethan Frey	United States	1:50.31	Q
6	6	Tonny Baltus	Netherlands	1:50.54	Q
7	1	Kim Bong-yu	South Korea	1:50.55	Q
8	4	Pedro Rocha	Portugal	1:50.80	Q
9	1	Shipo Dlamini	Swaziland	1:50.94	q
10	7	Curtis Robb	Great Britain	1:51.15	Q
11	7	Andrea Benvenuti	Italy	1:51.18	Q
12	7	Dean Kenneally	Australia	1:51.44	Q
13	1	Zsolt Gyimes	Hungary	1:51.54	q
14	7	Tor Öyvind Ödegard	Norway	1:51.81	q
15	6	Simon Still	Australia	1:51.86	Q
16	4	Orlando Castro	Spain	1:52.17	
17	7	Ibou Faye	Senegal	1:53.49	
18	1	Mounir Chellaoui	Morocco	1:53.66	
19	2	Ben Kurgat	Kenya	1:53.99	Q
20	2	Doug Consiglio	Canada	1:54.38	Q
21	2	Isaac Viciosa	Spain	1:54.79	Q
22	6	Wesley Rotich	Kenya	1:55.02	
23	2	Elijah Mushemeza	Uganda	1:55.55	
24	3	Reto Gächter	Switzerland	1:56.97	Q
25	3	Giuseppe D'Urso	Italy	1:57.00	Q
26	3	Moulai El-Azzouzi	Morocco	1:57.26	Q
27	4	Zachee Ngosso	Central African Republic	1:58.03	
28	7	Bassam Kawas	Lebanon	1:58.33	
29	6	Noel Vilivata	Solomon Islands	2:01.63	
30	5	Leon Haan	Netherlands	2:16.18	Q
31	5	Ahmed Abdullah Robleh	Qatar	2:16.61	Q
32	5	Barak Miantoloum	Chad	2:16.64	Q
	1	Nicodemus Eatlawe	Tanzania	DQ	
	3	Carlos Madrigal	Costa Rica	DQ	
	3	Colvis Samuels	Guyana	DQ	
	4	Mohammad Fani	Iran	DNF	

=== Semifinals ===
Rank	Heat	Athlete	Nationality	Time	Notes
1	3	Reto Gächter	Switzerland	1:47.73	Q
2	3	Dean Kenneally	Australia	1:47.78	Q
3	1	Terril Davis	United States	1:47.81	Q
4	3	Andrew Lill	Great Britain	1:47.83	q
5	3	Pavel Soukup	Czechoslovakia	1:47.84	q
6	1	Curtis Robb	Great Britain	1:47.96	Q
7	1	Doug Consiglio	Canada	1:48.17	
8	1	Andrea Benvenuti	Italy	1:48.19	
9	1	Simon Still	Australia	1:48.63	
10	2	Tommy Asinga	Suriname	1:49.45	Q
11	3	Ben Kurgat	Kenya	1:49.51	
12	2	Giuseppe D'Urso	Italy	1:49.60	Q
13	1	Pedro Rocha	Portugal	1:49.78	
14	2	Ethan Frey	United States	1:49.97	
15	1	Kim Bong-yu	South Korea	1:50.40	
16	1	Tor Öyvind Ödegard	Norway	1:50.74	
17	2	Isaac Viciosa	Spain	1:51.06	
18	2	Leon Haan	Netherlands	1:51.09	
19	3	Sipho Dlamini	Swaziland	1:51.56	
20	2	Ahmed Abdullah Robleh	Qatar	1:52.04	
21	2	Zsolt Gyimes	Hungary	1:52.07	
22	3	Barak Miantoloum	Chad	2:07.78	
	?	Moulai El-Azzouzi	Morocco	?	
	?	Tonny Baltus	Netherlands	?	

=== Final ===
Rank	Athlete	Nationality	Time	Notes
1st place, gold medalist(s)	Giuseppe D'Urso	Italy	1:46.82	
2nd place, silver medalist(s)	Curtis Robb	Great Britain	1:46.88	
2nd place, silver medalist(s)	Dean Kenneally	Australia	1:46.88	
4	Terril Davis	United States	1:47.34	
5	Pavel Soukup	Czechoslovakia	1:47.68	
6	Andrew Lill	Great Britain	1:47.73	
7	Reto Gächter	Switzerland	1:48.02	
8	Tommy Asinga	Suriname	1:48.14	
