= Czechoslovak Indoor Athletics Championships =

Annual indoor track and field competition

- Sport: Indoor track and field
- Founded: 1969
- Ceased: 1992
- Country: Czechoslovakia

The Czechoslovak Indoor Athletics Championships (Czech: Halové mistrovství Československa v atletice) was an annual indoor track and field competition organised by the Czechoslovak Athletics Federation, which served as the national championship for the sport in Czechoslovakia. Held over two days in February during the Czechoslovak winter, it was added to the national calendar in 1969 following the creation of a suitable indoor athletics venue in Jablonec nad Nisou. A Czech-only championship was held at the venue a year earlier.

The competition served as the winter, indoor counterpart to the main Czechoslovak Athletics Championships, held outdoors in the summer since 1919. The last edition was held in 1992 and after the dissolution of Czechoslovakia it was succeeded by the separate Czech Indoor and Slovak Indoor Athletics Championships.

== Events ==
The following athletics events feature as standard on the Czechoslovak Indoor Championships programme:

- Sprints: 60 m, 200 m, 400 m
- Distance track events: 800 m, 1500 m, 3000 m
- Hurdles: 60 m hurdles
- Jumps: long jump, triple jump, high jump, pole vault (men only)
- Throws: shot put
- Racewalking: 5000 m (men), 3000 m (women)
- Combined events: heptathlon (men), pentathlon (women)

The 60 metres sprint and 60 metres hurdles events were replaced by a 50 metres and a 50 metres hurdles in 1969, 1972, 1976, 1977, 1990, 1991, and 1992. A women's 80 metres hurdles was held at the first edition, but dropped thereafter. Other non-standard indoor events included a 100 metres in 1969, 1970, and 1989, and a 300 metres from 1971 to 1975.

The event programme gradually expanded over the years, with the 400 metres first appearing in 1976 and the 200 metres in 1982. The combined events first appeared in 1983 as unofficial championships before taking on national title status in 1987. The men's event was held as an octathlon for the first three years and no men's combined event appeared at the 1991 edition. The racewalking events were first contested in 1987.

Women were initially limited in events early in the competition's history. The first distance event for women, the 1500 metres was held in 1973 and the 3000 metres followed in 1982 (having had a one-off appearance in 1974). Women did not contest the 3000 m at the 1989 edition. The addition of a women's triple jump in 1991 brought the women to parity in the horizontal jumps. A Czechoslovak champion in women's pole vault was never elected, as the event was held only once as an exhibition in 1992.

== Editions ==
Ed.	Year	Location	Dates	Venue	Events	Athletes	Ref.
—	1968	Jablonec nad Nisou	9–10 March 1968				
1st	1969	Jablonec nad Nisou	22–23 February 1969				
2nd	1970	Jablonec nad Nisou	21–22 February 1970				
3rd	1971	Jablonec nad Nisou	13–14 February 1971				
4th	1972	Jablonec nad Nisou	12–13 February 1972				
5th	1973	Jablonec nad Nisou	10–11 February 1973				
6th	1974	Jablonec nad Nisou	23–24 February 1974				
7th	1975	Jablonec nad Nisou	15–16 February 1975				
8th	1976	Košice	7–8 February 1976				
9th	1977	Ostrava	26–27 February 1977				
10th	1978	Jablonec nad Nisou	25–26 February 1978				
11th	1979	Jablonec nad Nisou	10–11 February 1979				
12th	1980	Jablonec nad Nisou	16–17 February 1980				
13th	1981	Jablonec nad Nisou	7–8 February 1981				
14th	1982	Jablonec nad Nisou	20–21 February 1982				
15th	1983	Jablonec nad Nisou	19–20 February 1983				
16th	1984	Jablonec nad Nisou	18–19 February 1984				
17th	1985	Jablonec nad Nisou	9–10 February 1985				
18th	1986	Jablonec nad Nisou	8–9 February 1986				
19th	1987	Jablonec nad Nisou	7–8 February 1987				
20th	1988	Jablonec nad Nisou	20–21 February 1988				
21st	1989	Jablonec nad Nisou	4–5 February 1989				
22nd	1990	Prague	17–18 February 1990				
23rd	1991	Prague	23–24 February 1991				
24th	1992	Prague	15–16 February 1992				

== See also ==
- List of Czechoslovak Athletics Championships winners
