= Lyudmila Butuzova =

Soviet high jumper

Lyudmila Butuzova (born 28 February 1957) is a high jumper from the Soviet Union, who set the Kazakhstani and Uzbekistani national record on 1984-06-10, jumping 1.98 metres in Sochi.
