= 1990 World Junior Championships in Athletics – Men's 800 metres =

The men's 800 metres event at the 1990 World Junior Championships in Athletics was held in Plovdiv, Bulgaria, at Deveti Septemvri Stadium on 8, 9 and 10 August.

== Medalists ==
| Gold | Desta Asgedom; Ethiopia |
| Silver | Jonah Birir; Kenya |
| Bronze | Norberto Téllez; Cuba |

== Results ==
=== Final ===
10 August

| Rank | Name | Nationality | Time | Notes |
|---|---|---|---|---|
| 1st place, gold medalist(s) | Desta Asgedom | Ethiopia | 1:46.35 | |
| 2nd place, silver medalist(s) | Jonah Birir | Kenya | 1:46.61 | |
| 3rd place, bronze medalist(s) | Norberto Téllez | Cuba | 1:47.33 | |
| 4 | Wilson Kipketer | Kenya | 1:48.13 | |
| 5 | Andrew Lill | United Kingdom | 1:48.54 | |
| 6 | Václav Hrích | Czechoslovakia | 1:49.36 | |
| 7 | Dian Petkov | Bulgaria | 1:49.69 | |
| 8 | Mark Holcombe | Australia | 1:49.88 | |

=== Semifinals ===
9 August

==== Semifinal 1 ====
| Rank | Name | Nationality | Time | Notes |
|---|---|---|---|---|
| 1 | Jonah Birir | Kenya | 1:49.07 | Q |
| 2 | Dian Petkov | Bulgaria | 1:49.31 | Q |
| 3 | Aleksey Oleynikov | Soviet Union | 1:49.48 | |
| 4 | Alemayehu Roba | Ethiopia | 1:49.54 | |
| 5 | Pavel Soukup | Czechoslovakia | 1:49.60 | |
| 6 | Scott Peters | United States | 1:49.78 | |
| 7 | Michael Williams | Jamaica | 1:51.55 | |
| 8 | Eddy Kiemel | Netherlands | 1:58.89 | |

==== Semifinal 2 ====
| Rank | Name | Nationality | Time | Notes |
|---|---|---|---|---|
| 1 | Desta Asgedom | Ethiopia | 1:47.90 | Q |
| 2 | Wilson Kipketer | Kenya | 1:48.21 | Q |
| 3 | Václav Hrích | Czechoslovakia | 1:48.43 | q |
| 4 | Mark Sesay | United Kingdom | 1:49.56 | |
| 5 | Vincent Hoek | Netherlands | 1:50.66 | |
| 6 | Zhou Chaohui | China | 1:51.33 | |
| 7 | Michael Belbeck | Canada | 2:05.50 | |
| | Pantelis Kolokas | Greece | DNS | |

==== Semifinal 3 ====
| Rank | Name | Nationality | Time | Notes |
|---|---|---|---|---|
| 1 | Norberto Téllez | Cuba | 1:47.96 | Q |
| 2 | Andrew Lill | United Kingdom | 1:48.36 | Q |
| 3 | Mark Holcombe | Australia | 1:48.68 | q |
| 4 | David Decarpentry | France | 1:49.84 | |
| 5 | Vebjørn Rodal | Norway | 1:49.94 | |
| 6 | Bruno Mikale | Mauritius | 1:52.60 | |
| 7 | Ingo Janich | East Germany | 1:58.50 | |
| | Niall Bruton | Ireland | DNS | |

=== Heats ===
8 August

==== Heat 1 ====
| Rank | Name | Nationality | Time | Notes |
|---|---|---|---|---|
| 1 | Alemayehu Roba | Ethiopia | 1:48.51 | Q |
| 2 | Wilson Kipketer | Kenya | 1:48.66 | Q |
| 3 | Václav Hrích | Czechoslovakia | 1:48.88 | Q |
| 4 | Michael Williams | Jamaica | 1:49.43 | q |
| 5 | Michael Belbeck | Canada | 1:49.51 | q |
| 6 | Vincent Hoek | Netherlands | 1:50.02 | q |
| 7 | Jan Dalsgaard | Denmark | 1:50.81 | |
| 8 | Tomi Kankare | Finland | 1:54.45 | |

==== Heat 2 ====
| Rank | Name | Nationality | Time | Notes |
|---|---|---|---|---|
| 1 | Desta Asgedom | Ethiopia | 1:49.07 | Q |
| 2 | Dian Petkov | Bulgaria | 1:49.42 | Q |
| 3 | Norberto Téllez | Cuba | 1:49.52 | Q |
| 4 | Pantelis Kolokas | Greece | 1:49.52 | q |
| 5 | Jorge Alanis | Spain | 1:51.79 | |
| 6 | Zvonko Bjelkanović | Yugoslavia | 1:52.17 | |
| 7 | Henrique Meira | Portugal | 1:52.43 | |
| 8 | Amir Mhando | Tanzania | 1:58.47 | |

==== Heat 3 ====
| Rank | Name | Nationality | Time | Notes |
|---|---|---|---|---|
| 1 | Ingo Janich | East Germany | 1:49.15 | Q |
| 2 | Scott Peters | United States | 1:49.27 | Q |
| 3 | Zhou Chaohui | China | 1:49.55 | Q |
| 4 | Niall Bruton | Ireland | 1:49.64 | q |
| 5 | Bruno Mikale | Mauritius | 1:49.73 | q |
| 6 | Kevin Sullivan | Canada | 1:51.57 | |
| 7 | Belkacem Aït Kaci | Algeria | 1:53.85 | |
| | Riyadh Hugairy | North Yemen | DNF | |

==== Heat 4 ====
| Rank | Name | Nationality | Time | Notes |
|---|---|---|---|---|
| 1 | Jonah Birir | Kenya | 1:50.36 | Q |
| 2 | Vebjørn Rodal | Norway | 1:50.58 | Q |
| 3 | Eddy Kiemel | Netherlands | 1:50.58 | Q |
| 4 | Dariusz Trudnowski | Poland | 1:50.60 | |
| 5 | Draško Odrljin | Yugoslavia | 1:50.75 | |
| 6 | Yuriy Tatarchuk | Soviet Union | 1:50.98 | |
| 7 | Carsten Otte | West Germany | 1:52.15 | |
| 8 | Lewis Lacey | United States | 1:52.98 | |

==== Heat 5 ====
| Rank | Name | Nationality | Time | Notes |
|---|---|---|---|---|
| 1 | Aleksey Oleynikov | Soviet Union | 1:51.00 | Q |
| 2 | Mark Holcombe | Australia | 1:51.16 | Q |
| 3 | Andrew Lill | United Kingdom | 1:51.25 | Q |
| 4 | Edgardo Graglia | Argentina | 1:51.36 | |
| 5 | Marco Garzia | Italy | 1:51.90 | |
| 6 | Daniel Bălașa | Romania | 1:52.37 | |
| 7 | Niclas Norling | Sweden | 2:00.79 | |
| | Omar Best | Venezuela | DQ | |

==== Heat 6 ====
| Rank | Name | Nationality | Time | Notes |
|---|---|---|---|---|
| 1 | Pavel Soukup | Czechoslovakia | 1:50.70 | Q |
| 2 | Mark Sesay | United Kingdom | 1:51.02 | Q |
| 3 | David Decarpentry | France | 1:51.32 | Q |
| 4 | Constantin Repca | Romania | 1:51.59 | |
| 5 | Kealin Hannigan | Australia | 1:53.17 | |
| 6 | Felipe Murga | Spain | 2:00.16 | |
| 7 | Nesamani Subramaniam | Singapore | 2:00.27 | |
| | Steven Roberts | Barbados | DQ | IAAF rule 141.2 |

== Participation ==
According to an unofficial count, 48 athletes from 36 countries participated in the event.

- Algeria (1)
- Argentina (1)
- Australia (2)
- Barbados (1)
- Bulgaria (1)
- Canada (2)
- China (1)
- Cuba (1)
- Czechoslovakia (2)
- Denmark (1)
- East Germany (1)
- Ethiopia (2)
- Finland (1)
- France (1)
- Greece (1)
- Ireland (1)
- Italy (1)
- Jamaica (1)
- Kenya (2)
- Mauritius (1)
- Netherlands (2)
- North Yemen (1)
- Norway (1)
- Poland (1)
- Portugal (1)
- Romania (2)
- Singapore (1)
- Soviet Union (2)
- Spain (2)
- Sweden (1)
- Tanzania (1)
- United Kingdom (2)
- United States (2)
- Venezuela (1)
- West Germany (1)
- Yugoslavia (2)
