= Petr Pipa =

Slovak long-distance runner

Personal information
- Nationality: Slovak
- Born: 12 June 1964 (age 61) Czechoslovakia

Sport
- Sport: Long-distance running
- Club: Onix B. Bystrica

Petr Pipa (born 12 June 1964) is a retired Slovak long-distance runner. He won races including the Košice Peace Marathon, the Hamburg Marathon, the 10,000 metres at the Czechoslovak Athletics Championships, and the Běchovice – Prague Race. He took part in races including the 1990 and 1991 editions of the IAAF World Cross Country Championships, the 10,000 metres at the 1991 European Cup "A" Final, the 1993 World Championships in Athletics – Men's marathon, plus the 1997 IAAF World Half Marathon Championships.

In 1994 he became just the third Slovak to win the Košice Peace Marathon, a race which was first held in 1924.

Pipa won the 1996 Hamburg Marathon, but his finishing time was 22 seconds slower than the Olympic qualification time of 2:16:00, so he narrowly missed the chance to represent his country in the 1996 Summer Olympics.
