= Tlučná =

- Municipality
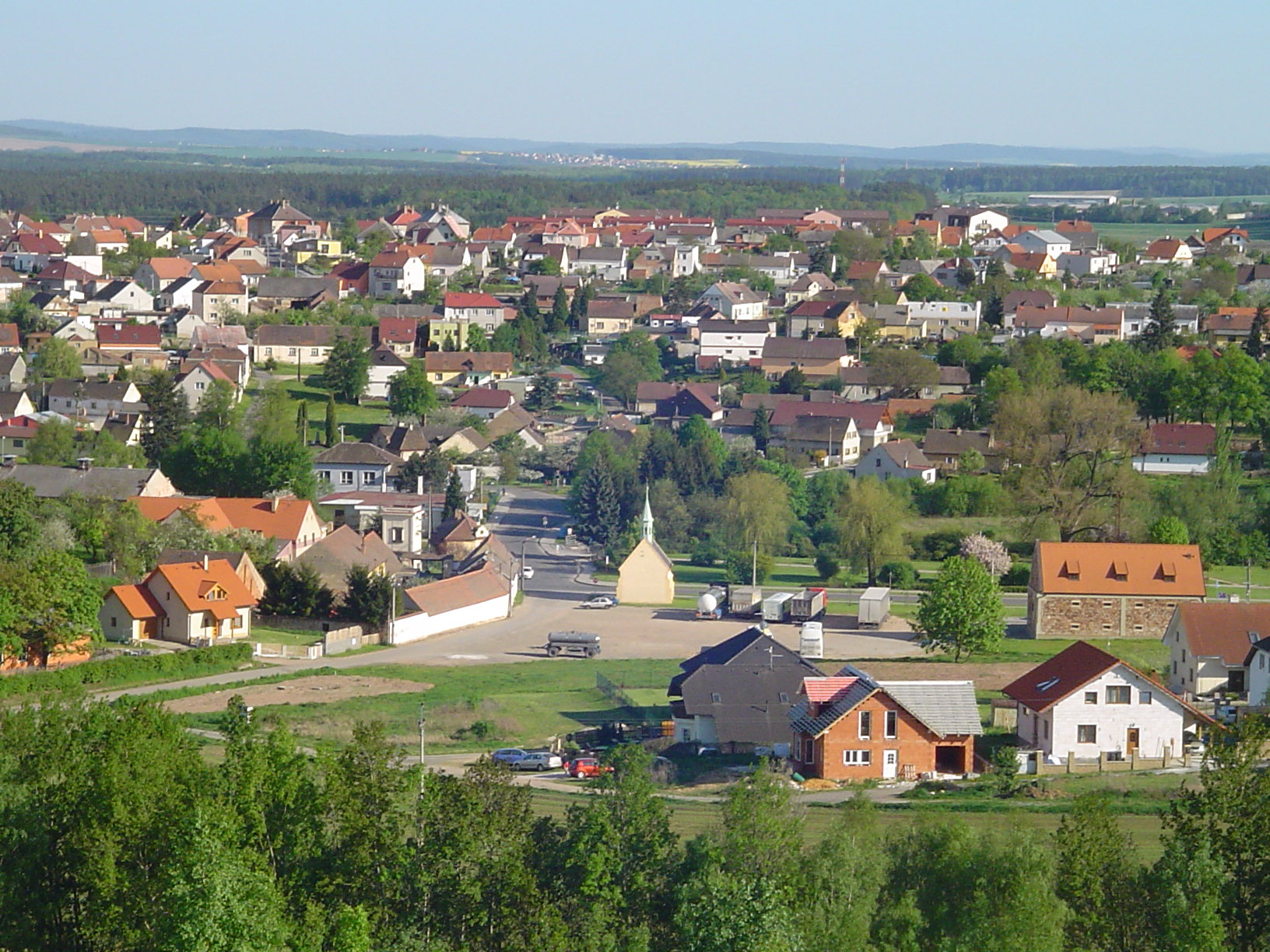
- General view

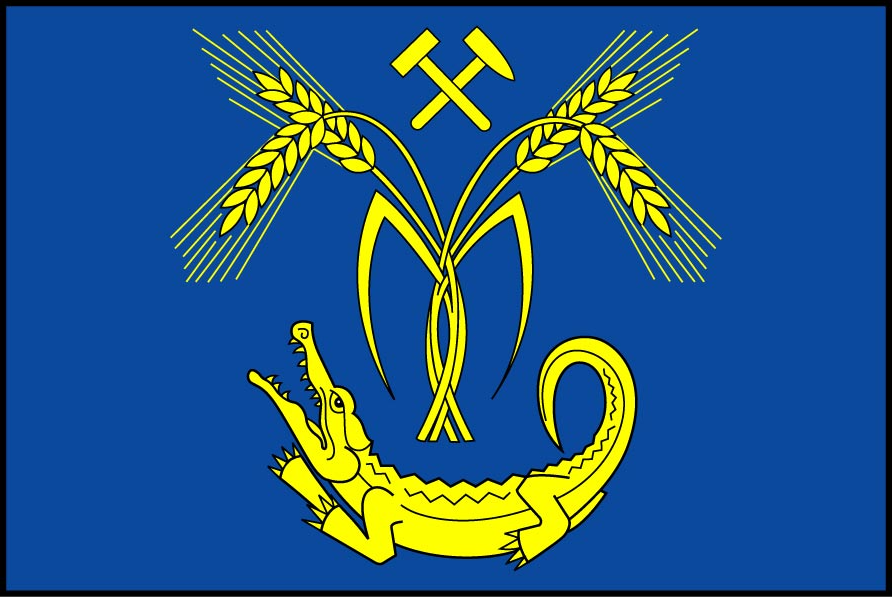
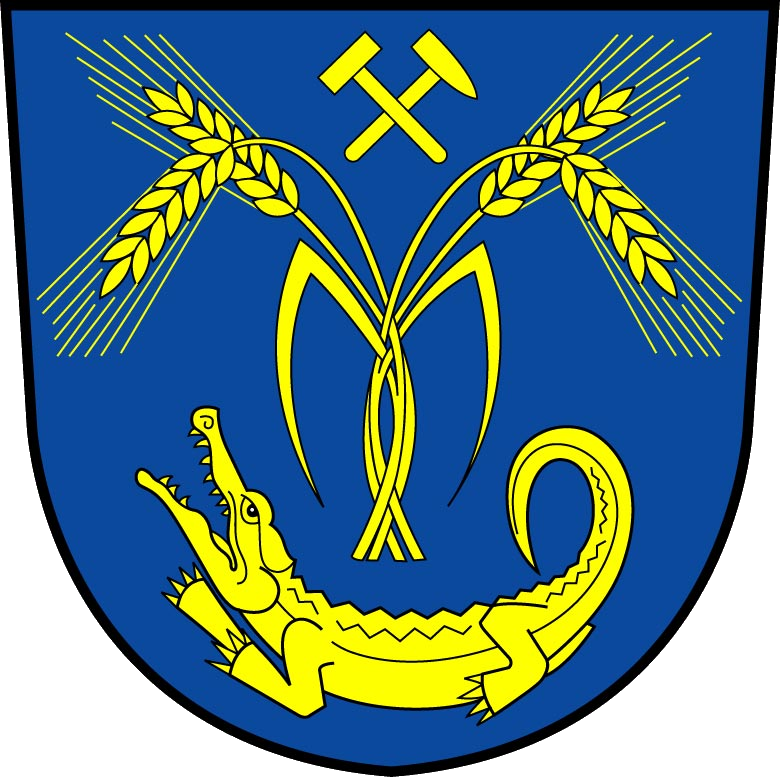
- Flag Coat of arms

- Location in the Czech Republic
- Coordinates: 49°43′27″N 13°14′7″E
- Country: Czech Republic
- Region: Plzeň
- District: Plzeň-North
- First mentioned: 1115

Area
  - Total: 7.17 km^{2} (2.77 sq mi)
- Elevation: 330 m (1,080 ft)

Population (2026-01-01)
  - Total: 3,427
  - Density: 478/km^{2} (1,240/sq mi)
- Time zone: UTC+1 (CET)
  - Summer (DST): UTC+2 (CEST)
- Postal code: 330 26
- Website: www.obec-tlucna.cz

Tlučná (Czech pronunciation: [ˈtlutʃnaː]) is a municipality and village in Plzeň-North District in the Plzeň Region of the Czech Republic. It has about 3,400 inhabitants.

== Etymology ==
The name was derived from the Old Czech word tluč, which then probably meant 'barley' or other pounded grain.

== Geography ==
Tlučná is located about 9 kilometres (6 mi) west of Plzeň. It lies in the Plasy Uplands. The highest point is at 405 m (1,329 ft) above sea level. The stream Vejprnický potok flows through the municipality.

== History ==
The first written mention of Tlučná is from 1115, when Duke Vladislaus I donated the village to the monastery in Kladruby.

== Demographics ==
Historical population

Year	Pop.	±%
1869	571	—
1880	746	+30.6%
1890	1,038	+39.1%
1900	1,355	+30.5%
1910	1,605	+18.5%

Year	Pop.	±%
1921	1,843	+14.8%
1930	2,182	+18.4%
1950	2,173	−0.4%
1961	2,680	+23.3%
1970	2,633	−1.8%

Year	Pop.	±%
1980	2,432	−7.6%
1991	2,241	−7.9%
2001	2,317	+3.4%
2011	3,036	+31.0%
2021	3,295	+8.5%

Source: Censuses

== Transport ==
Tlučná is located on the railway line Plzeň–Domažlice.

== Sights ==
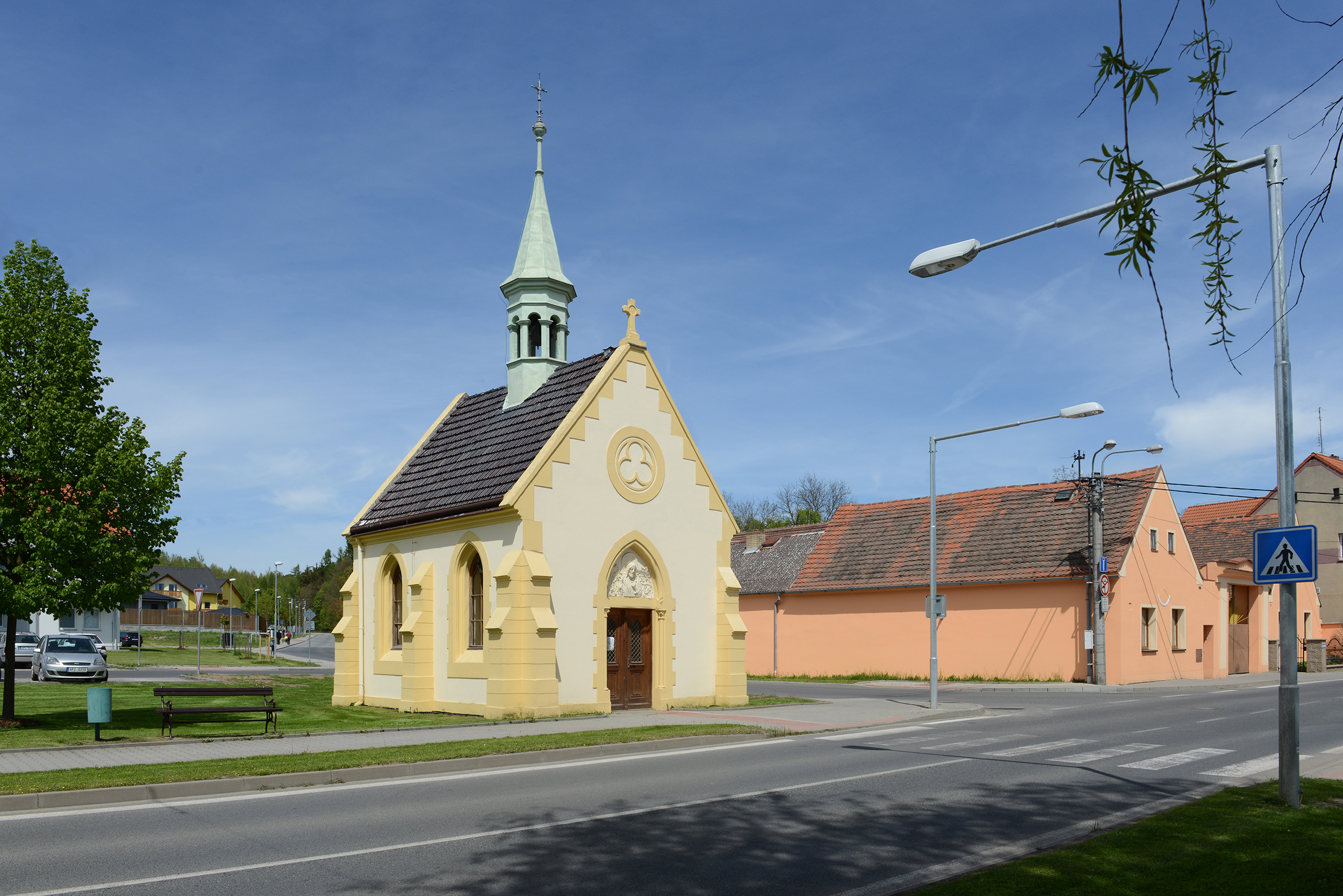
Chapel of Saint Peter

There are two protected cultural monuments in the municipality: a column shrine from the second half of the 17th century and a former manor house, of which only the Neoclassical granary and the Neo-Gothic chapel survived. This Chapel of Saint Peter dates from the second half of the 19th century.

== Notable people ==
- Pavel Soukup (born 1971), athlete; raised here

== Twin towns – sister cities ==
Tlučná is twinned with:

- Floß, Germany
