= Ladislav Moc =

Czech racewalker

Personal information
- Nationality: Czech
- Born: 17 September 1931 Sobočice, Kolín District, Czechoslovakia
- Died: 18 September 2022 (aged 91)

Sport
- Sport: Athletics
- Event: Racewalking

Ladislav Moc (17 September 1931 – 18 September 2022) was a Czech racewalker. He competed in the men's 20 kilometres walk at the 1960 Summer Olympics.
