= Pavel Soukup =

Czech middle-distance runner

Personal information
- Nationality: Czech
- Born: 2 January 1971 (age 55) Stod, Czechoslovakia
- Height: 1.88 m (6 ft 2 in)
- Weight: 70 kg (150 lb)

Sport
- Sport: Running
- Event: 800 metres
- Club: USK Praha
Medal record
Representing Czech Republic
World Indoor Championships
Bronze medal – third place	1995 Barcelona	800 m
Summer Universiade
Bronze medal – third place	1995 Fukuoka	800 m

Pavel Soukup (born 2 January 1971) is a retired Czech middle-distance runner who specialised in the 800 metres. He is best known for winning bronze medals at the 1995 World Indoor Championships and the 1995 Summer Universiade. In addition, he competed at the 1996 Summer Olympics, as well as two World Championships.

His personal bests in the event are 1:45.37 outdoors (Nürnberg 1997) and 1:46.38 indoors (Ludwigshafen 1995).

== Personal life ==
Soukup was born on 2 January 1971 in Stod, but was raised in Tlučná.

== Competition record ==
Year	Competition	Venue	Position	Event	Notes
Representing Czechoslovakia
1989	European Junior Championships	Varaždin, Yugoslavia	7th	800 m	1:51.55
1989	European Junior Championships	Varaždin, Yugoslavia	–	4 × 400 m relay	DNF
1990	World Junior Championships	Plovdiv, Bulgaria	12th (sf)	800 m	1:49.60
1990	World Junior Championships	Plovdiv, Bulgaria	15th (h)	4 × 400 m relay	3:11.85
1991	Universiade	Sheffield, United Kingdom	5th	800 m	1:47.68
1992	European Indoor Championships	Genoa, Italy	22nd (h)	800 m	1:51.53
Representing the Czech Republic
1993	Universiade	Buffalo, United States	25th (h)	800 m	1:51.52
1995	World Indoor Championships	Barcelona, Spain	3rd	800 m	1:47.74
1995	World Championships	Gothenburg, Sweden	27th (h)	800 m	1:48.32
1995	Universiade	Fukuoka, Japan	3rd	800 m	1:48.15
1996	Olympic Games	Atlanta, United States	32nd (h)	800 m	1:47.67
1997	World Indoor Championships	Paris, France	10th (sf)	800 m	1:48.73
1997	World Championships	Athens, Greece	33rd (h)	800 m	1:48.16
