= Václav Chudomel =

Czech long-distance runner

Vaclav Chudomal
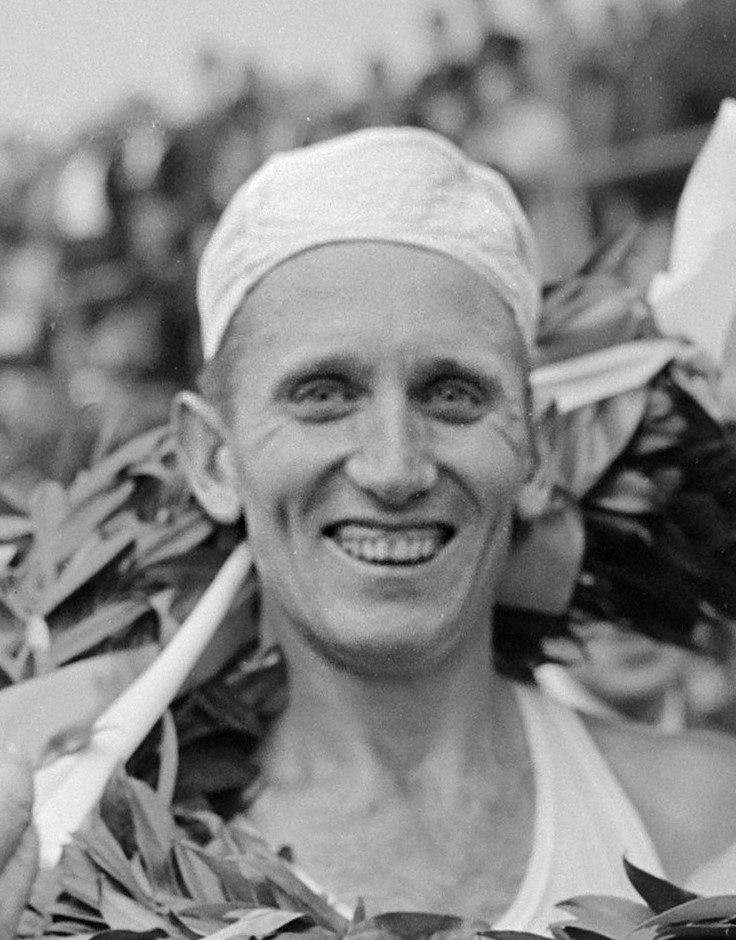
- Václav Chudomel in 1963

Personal information
- Born: 27 September 1932 Paběnice, Czech Republic
- Died: 15 December 2016 (aged 84)
- Height: 1.73 m (5 ft 8 in)
- Weight: 68 kg (150 lb)

Sport
- Sport: Long-distance running
- Club: Bohemians Praha, Praha
- Retired: Never, still running to this day

Václav Chudomel (27 September 1932 – 15 December 2016) was a Czech long-distance runner. He competed in the marathon at the 1964 Summer Olympics and finished in 18th place. He won the Košice Peace Marathon in 1969.
