= Martin Vrábeľ =

Czech long-distance runner (born 1955)

Personal information
- Nationality: Slovak
- Born: 21 September 1955 (age 70)

Sport
- Sport: Long-distance running
- Event: Marathon

Martin Vrábeľ (born 21 September 1955 in Prešov, Czechoslovakia) is a Slovak long-distance runner. He competed in the men's marathon at the 1988 Summer Olympics. His international successes include victories in the Hamburg Marathon in Germany in 1988, a second place finish in the Houston Marathon (with his PR time of 2:12.40) in 1991 and a win in the Madrid Marathon in Spain in 1993.

He was an eight-time Czechoslovak national champion in the 10,000 meter run in the 1980s with a P.R. of 28:05 on the track.
