= Jan Broda =

Czech long and triple jumper

Jan Broda (24 April 1940 in Český Těšín – 17 May 2022) was a Czech long and triple jumper.

Representing Czechoslovakia, he finished tenth at the 1970 European Indoor Championships and fourteenth at the 1971 European Indoor Championships.

He became Czechoslovak champion triple jump champion in 1970, and long jump champion in 1965, 1968 and 1969. He became Czechoslovak indoor champion in 1969, 1970, 1971 and 1973 and long jump champion in 1970.
