= Eva Murková =

Personal information
- Born: 29 May 1962 (age 64) Bojnice, Czechoslovakia

Sport
- Sport: Track and field
Medal record
Representing Czechoslovakia
European Indoor Championships
Gold medal – first place	1983 Budapest	Long jump
Silver medal – second place	1984 Gothenburg	Long jump
Silver medal – second place	1985 Athens	Long jump

Eva Murková (born 29 May 1962) is a Slovak retired long jumper who represented Czechoslovakia. Her greatest achievement was the gold medal at the European Athletics Indoor Championships in 1983. She also won silver medals in the event at the 1984 and 1985 editions. She represented Czechoslovakia at the World Championships in Athletics in 1983 and 1987. Her first was her best performance, coming seventh with a jump of 6.80 m (22 ft 3 1/2 in). Her career best in the long jump was 7.01 m (22 ft 11 3/4 in). At the Czechoslovak Athletics Championships she was a two-time 100 metres champion and a four-time long jump national champion.

== International competitions ==
Year	Competition	Venue	Position	Notes
Representing Czechoslovakia
1983	European Indoor Championships	Budapest, Hungary	1st	6.77 =CR
1984	European Indoor Championships	Gothenburg, Sweden	2nd	6.55
1985	European Indoor Championships	Athens, Greece	2nd	6.99
