= Dean Kenneally =

Australian physiotherapist (born 1967)

Personal information
- Born: 8 March 1967 (age 59) Victoria, Australia

Sport
- Sport: Track and field
Medal record
Representing Australia
Summer Universiade
Silver medal – second place	1991 Sheffield	800 m

Dean Bryan Kenneally (born 8 March 1967) is an Australian physiotherapist who was the primary team physio for Chelsea FC until 2007.

Previously he has worked for Tottenham Hotspur, as well as the Australian and British national athletics teams.

In 2007, he moved into sports management roles including time with the English Institute of Sport, National Sports Medicine Program - Qatar and the Australian Institute of Sport. He is currently the High Performance Director for EliteSport UAE.

During his active sports career he was an 800 metres runner. His greatest achievement was a silver medal at the 1991 Universiade. He also participated at the 1994 Commonwealth Games, finishing 5th in his heat while affected by an achilles tendon injury incurred 12 days before the heat on 23 August 1994. He also won the Australian 800m Championship in 1990, was placed 3rd in 1991, 2nd in 1992 later running his lifetime best of 1:46.54 in Dijon, France on 12 June 1992 before placing 7th in the World Cup in Havana, Cuba on 26 September 1992. Following an operation on his achilles tendon on 15 April 1995, and a stress fracture of the foot in 1997, he retired to concentrate on his successful Physiotherapy career.

He was educated at Wesley College, Melbourne.
