= Ágnes Herczeg =

Hungarian artist

Ágnes Herczeg is a Hungarian artist who works with found wood and embroidery with only plant-based materials. She was born in Kecskemét. Herczeg is a graduate of the Hungarian University of Fine Arts and studied textile conservation. Her embroidery has been produced with methods including needle lace, pillow lace, and macramé.

Herczeg's art often portray women as introspective and resting. Critic Sara Barnes describes Herczeg's pieces as having a "striking visual juxtaposition [between] the looseness of the lace and the solidity of the wood."
