= Kai Karsten =

German sprinter

Personal information
- Born: 22 June 1968 (age 58) Braunschweig, West Germany
- Height: 1.88 m (6 ft 2 in)
- Weight: 75 kg (165 lb)

Sport
- Country: Germany
- Sport: Athletics
- Event: 400 metres
- Club: LG Braunschweig

Achievements and titles
- Personal best: 400 m: 45.95 (1995)

Kai Karsten (born 22 June 1968) is a retired German sprinter who specialized in the 400 metres.

Karsten competed for the club Eintracht Braunschweig, which in athletics enters a joint team with other Braunschweig-based clubs under the name of LG Braunschweig. In 1994, he won the national championship in the 400 metres.

Karsten represented Germany in the 4 × 400 metres relay events at the 1994 European Athletics Championships in Helsinki, the 1995 World Championships in Athletics in Gothenburg, and the 1996 Summer Olympics in Atlanta.
