= Zdeněk Nenadál =

Czech javelin thrower

Personal information
- Nationality: Czech
- Born: 12 February 1964 (age 62) Prostějov, Czechoslovakia

Sport
- Sport: Athletics
- Event: Javelin throw

Zdeněk Nenadál (born 12 February 1964) is a Czech athlete. He competed in the men's javelin throw at the 1988 Summer Olympics.
