= Josef Horčic =

Czech middle-distance runner

Personal information
- Nationality: Czech
- Born: 25 May 1945 (age 81) České Budějovice, Czechoslovakia

Sport
- Sport: Middle-distance running
- Event: 1500 metres

Josef Horčic (born 25 May 1945) is a Czech middle-distance runner. He competed in the men's 1500 metres at the 1972 Summer Olympics.
