= Roman Moravec =

Slovak high jumper

Personal information
- Nationality: Slovak
- Born: 30 December 1950 Bratislava, Czechoslovakia
- Died: 2 November 2009 (aged 58) Bratislava, Slovakia

Sport
- Sport: Athletics
- Event: High jump
Medal record
Representing Czechoslovakia
Summer Universiade
| Bronze medal – third place | 1973 Moscow | High jump |

Roman Moravec (30 December 1950 – 2 November 2009) was a Slovak athlete. He competed in the men's high jump at the 1972 Summer Olympics.
