= Pavol Szikora =

Czechoslovak racewalker (1952–2021)

Pavol Szikora (26 March 1952 – 22 May 2021) was a Slovak race walker. He was born in Lučenec and represented the club Dukla Banská Bystrica.

He finished eleventh at the 1983 World Championships (50 km), won the silver medal at the 1984 Friendship Games (50 km), finished eighth at the 1986 European Championships (50 km), seventh at the 1987 World Championships (50 km), tenth at the 1988 Olympic Games (50 km) sixteenth at the 1991 World Championships (50 km), fifteenth at the 1991 IAAF World Race Walking Cup (50 km), and 27th at the 1992 Olympic Games (50 km). He became Czechoslovak champion in 1983, 1985, 1986, 1988, 1990, and 1991 (50 km).
