= Dana Vavřačová =

Dana Vavřačová (born 25 June 1954 in Jablonec nad Nisou) is a Czech retired race walker.

In the 3000 metres walk she finished fourth at the 1985 World Indoor Games, the 1987 World Indoor Championships and the 1987 European Indoor Championships. She then won the silver medal at the 1988 European Indoor Championships, finished ninth at the 1989 World Indoor Championships and fourth again at the 1990 European Indoor Championships. In the 10 kilometres distance she finished tenth at the 1987 World Championships and thirteenth at the 1986 European Championships. She became Czechoslovak champion in 1984, 1985, 1986 and 1987.

== International cometptions ==
| Year | Competition | Venue | Position | Event | Notes |
Representing Czechoslovakia
| 1985 | World Indoor Games | Paris, France | 4th | 5000 m | |
| 1985 | World Race Walking Cup | St John's, Isle of Man | 12th | 10 km | 47:41 |
| 1986 | European Championships | Stuttgart, West Germany | 13th | 10 km | 48:46 |
Representing Czech Republic
| 2000 | European Race Walking Cup | Eisenhüttenstadt, Germany | 53rd | 20 km | 1:48:59 |
