= Josef Odložil =

Czech middle-distance runner

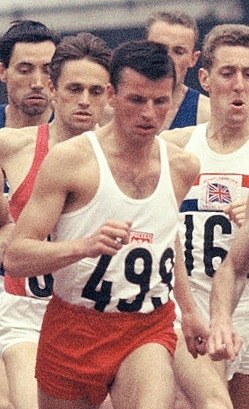
- Odložil, following in red vest, at the 1964 Olympic Games in Tokyo

Personal information
- Born: 11 November 1938 Otrokovice, Czecho-Slovak Republic
- Died: 10 September 1993 (aged 54) Olomouc, Czech Republic
- Height: 1.77 m (5 ft 10 in)
- Weight: 70 kg (154 lb)

Sport
- Sport: Athletics
- Event: 1500 m
- Club: Dukla Prague
- Retired: 1969

Achievements and titles
- Personal bests: 800 m: 1:51.0 (1962); 1000 m: 2:18.6 (1965); 1500 m: 3:37.6 (1966, NR); mile: 3:55.55 (1965); 2000 m: 5:01.2 (1965, WR); 3000 m: 8:10.2 (1964); 1500 m indoor: 3:49.6 (1967)
Medal record
Men's athletics
Representing Czechoslovakia
Olympic Games
Silver medal – second place	1964 Tokyo	1500 m
European Indoor Championships
Silver medal – second place	1967 Prague	1500m
Summer Universiade
Silver medal – second place	1961 Sofia	4x400m relay

Josef Odložil (Czech pronunciation: [ˈjozɛf ˈodloʒɪl]; 11 November 1938 – 10 September 1993) was a Czech middle-distance runner. During the 1960s he was a national champion on numerous occasions but had mixed success at international level. He won a silver medal in the 1500 metres at the 1964 Tokyo Olympics.

== Running career ==
An avid runner since early age, Odložil began training with a coach at a military school in Bratislava. At his first major competition, the 1962 European Athletics Championships in Belgrade, Odložil was eliminated in the 800 metres semi-final. Two years later he ran 1500 metres at the 1964 Summer Olympics in Tokyo. Peter Snell easily won the final, but Odložil managed to get silver ahead of John Davies. In 1965 Odložil set a new world record on 2000 m (5:01,2). The 1966 European Athletics Championships were disastrous for Odložil as he was eliminated already in the heats. He did better at the 1967 European Athletics Indoor Championships in Prague, taking silver in the 1500 m, but at the 1968 Olympics finished only eighth in the 1500 m. Odložil retired in 1969.

== Retirement ==
After retiring from competitions Odložil, a career military officer, was also forced to retire from the Czechoslovak Army, for political reasons. He turned into coaching, first at Sparta Prague and then at the Institutio Nacional del Deporte in Mexico (1979–1981). In 1989 he was reinstated in the Army, and served there until his death. In 1992–1993 he was commander of UN peacekeepers in Iraq (UNGCI) representing Czechoslovakia.

== Personal life and death ==
At the 1964 Olympics Odložil became a close friend of the winner, Peter Snell, and after the Olympics visited him in New Zealand. Shortly after the 1968 Olympics, Odložil married the famous gymnast Věra Čáslavská. The ceremony, which took place at the Mexico City Cathedral, drew a crowd of thousands. The couple had a son, Martin, and daughter, Radka. They divorced in 1987. On 7 August 1993 Odložil had a quarrel with his 19-year-old son. Martin hit him in the head, which resulted in a prolonged coma and death on 10 September 1993. Martin was sentenced to four years of imprisonment for his father's murder, but was granted a pardon by president Václav Havel in 1997, because the degree of fault on his father's death was not well proven.

== Legacy ==
Since 1994 an athletic meet Josef Odložil Memorial is held annually in his memory.
