= Czechoslovak Athletics Championships =

Czachhosvolak Athletics Championship

- Sport: Track and field
- Founded: 1919
- Ceased: 1992
- Country: Czechoslovakia

The Czechoslovak Athletics Championships (Czech: Mistrovství Československé v atletice) was an annual outdoor track and field competition organised by the Czechoslovakia Athletics Association, which served as the national championship for the sport in Czechoslovakia.

Typically organised in July or August, the event was first held in 1919 (the first summer after the country's formation) until 1992. The competition was not held in the years from 1938 to 1944 due to World War II and ran for 66 editions in total. It was superseded by the Czech Athletics Championships and Slovak Athletics Championships following the country's dissolution in 1993. Czechoslovakia had sometimes hosted separate Czech and Slovak sub-national championships before then.

The Czechoslovak Indoor Athletics Championships was later introduced in 1969 to complement the summer outdoor event with a spring one.

== Events ==
By its final year, the competition programme featured a total of 35 individual Czechoslovak Championship athletics events, 19 for men and 16 for women. For men, there were seven track running events, three obstacle events, four jumps, four throws, and the decathlon. Women did not have pole vault, hammer throw or 3000 metres steeplechase championship contests.

Track running

- 100 metres, 200 metres, 400 metres, 800 metres, 1500 metres, 3000 metres (women only), 5000 metres (men only), 10,000 metres

Obstacle events

- 100 metres hurdles (women only), 110 metres hurdles (men only), 400 metres hurdles, 3000 metres steeplechase (men only)

Jumping events

- Pole vault (men only), high jump, long jump, triple jump

Throwing events

- Shot put, discus throw, javelin throw, hammer throw (men only)

Combined events

- Decathlon (men only), heptathlon (women only)

Men competed in a 200 metres hurdles until 1967, by which point the event had fallen out of favour in international competitions. The women's programme was gradually expanded from the 1960s onwards, with the 1500 m appearing in 1969, the 3000 m in 1972, the 10,000 m in 1984, and the triple jump in 1990. The women's hurdles events gradually changed too: the 80 metres hurdles became the 100 m version in 1968, a 200 m version was held from 1970 to 1972, then the women's 400 m hurdles began in 1975. The women's combined event was the athletics pentathlon up to 1980.

Separate championship events were held for road running and walks, and cross country running.

== Editions ==
#	Year	Date	Venue
1st	1919	June	Prague
2nd	1920	July	Prague
3rd	1921	July	Prague
4th	1922	July	Prague
5th	1923	June	Prague
6th	1924	June	Prague
7th	1925	July	Prague
8th	1926	June	Brno
9th	1927	June	Brno
10th	1928	July	Prague
11th	1929	June	Prague
12th	1930	June	Brno
13th	1931	June	Prague
14th	1932	June	Brno
15th	1933	July	Pardubice
16th	1934	June	Prague
17th	1935	June	Prague
18th	1936	July	Prague
19th	1937	July	Prague
20th	1945	August	Prague
21st	1946	August	Prague
22nd	1947	August	Prague
23rd	1948	June	Prague
24th	1949	July	Prague
25th	1950	August	Bratislava
26th	1951	July	Brno
27th	1952	June	Prague
28th	1953	July	Prague
29th	1954	August	Ostrava
30th	1955	September	Brno
31st	1956	September	Bratislava
32nd	1957	August	Prague
33rd	1958	July	Ostrava
34th	1959	July	Prague
35th	1960	July	Brno
36th	1961	September	Prague
36th	1962	July	Ostrava
37th	1963	July	Hradec Králové
38th	1964	July	Prague
39th	1965	July	Zábřeh
40th	1966	August	Třinec
41st	1967	July	Sokolov
42nd	1968	July	Jablonec nad Nisou
43rd	1969	July	Považská Bystrica
44th	1970	September	Ostrava
45th	1971	September	Prague
46th	1972	July	Prague
47th	1973	September	Banská Bystrica
48th	1974	July	Prague
49th	1975	August	Bratislava
50th	1976	August	Třinec
51st	1977	August	Ostrava
52nd	1978	August	Prague
53rd	1979	July	Prague
54th	1980	July	Prague
55th	1981	August	Ostrava
56th	1982	July	Prague
57th	1983	July	Prague
58th	1984	July	Prague
59th	1985	August	Prague
60th	1986	July	Bratislava
61st	1987	August	Třinec
62nd	1988	July	Prague
63rd	1989	July	Banská Bystrica
64th	1990	July	Prague
65th	1991	July	Ostrava
66th	1992	July	Nitra

== See also ==
- Czechoslovak Indoor Athletics Championships
- List of Czechoslovak Athletics Championships winners
