= Zuzana Lajbnerová =

Czech heptathlete

Personal information
- Nationality: Czech
- Born: 20 May 1963 (age 63) Hradec Králové, Czechoslovakia

Sport
- Sport: Athletics
- Event: Heptathlon
Medal record
Representing Czechoslovakia
Summer Universiade
Bronze medal – third place	1987 Zagreb	Heptathlon

Zuzana Lajbnerová (born 20 May 1963) is a Czech athlete. She competed in the women's heptathlon at the 1988 Summer Olympics.
