= Athletics at the 2011 Pan American Games – Men's 800 metres =

Men's 800 metres at the 2011 Pan American Games
- Venue: Telmex Athletics Stadium
- Dates: October 27 - October 28
- Competitors: 16 from 12 nations

Medalists
Gold medal	Andy González	Cuba
Silver medal	Kleberson Davide	Brazil
Bronze medal	Raidel Acea	Cuba

The men's 800 metres sprint competition of the athletics events at the 2011 Pan American Games took place between the 27 and 28 of October at the Telmex Athletics Stadium. The defending Pan American Games champion was Yeimer López of Cuba.

== Records ==
Prior to this competition, the existing world and Pan American Games records were as follows:

World record	David Rudisha (KEN)	1:41.01	Rieti, Italy	August 29, 2010
Pan American Games record	Yeimer López (CUB)	1:44.58	Rio de Janeiro, Brazil	July 28, 2007

== Qualification ==
Each National Olympic Committee (NOC) was able to enter one athlete regardless if they had met the qualification standard. To enter two entrants both athletes had to have met the minimum standard (1:49.0) in the qualifying period (January 1, 2010 to September 14, 2011).

== Schedule ==
Date	Time	Round
October 27, 2011	16:45	Semifinals
October 28, 2011	16:10	Final

== Results ==
All times shown are in seconds.

KEY:	q	Fastest non-qualifiers	Q	Qualified	NR	National record	PB	Personal best	SB	Seasonal best	DQ	Disqualified

=== Semifinals ===
Held on October 27. The first three in each heat and the next two fastest advanced to the finals.

Rank	Heat	Name	Nationality	Time	Notes
1	1	Andy González	Cuba	1:48.21	Q
2	1	Mark Wieczorek	United States	1:48.31	Q
3	1	Lutimar Paes	Brazil	1:48.37	Q
4	1	Rafith Rodríguez	Colombia	1:48.41	q
5	1	Moise Joseph	Haiti	1:49.12	q
6	1	Nico Herrera	Venezuela	1:49.29	
7	2	Tyler Mulder	United States	1:49.65	Q
8	2	Kleberson Davide	Brazil	1:49.65	Q
9	2	Raidel Acea	Cuba	1:50.04	Q
10	2	Jamaal James	Trinidad and Tobago	1:50.14	
11	1	Jose Esparza	Mexico	1:50.65	
12	2	Jenner Pelico	Guatemala	1:51.12	
13	2	Juan Vega	Argentina	1:52.60	
14	2	Edgard Cortez	Nicaragua	1:59.02	
15	1	Jon Rankin	Cayman Islands	2:21.36	ADV
	2	Eduar Villanueva	Venezuela	DNS	

Jon Rankin was advanced to the final due to interference.

=== Final ===
Held on October 28.

Rank	Name	Nationality	Time	Notes
1st place, gold medalist(s)	Andy González	Cuba	1:45.58	SB
2nd place, silver medalist(s)	Kleberson Davide	Brazil	1:45.75	
3rd place, bronze medalist(s)	Raidel Acea	Cuba	1:46.23	
4	Tyler Mulder	United States	1:46.46	
5	Mark Wieczorek	United States	1:47.75	
6	Lutimar Paes	Brazil	1:47.76	
7	Jon Rankin	Cayman Islands	1:52.72	
8	Moise Joseph	Haiti	1:54.88	
9	Rafith Rodríguez	Colombia	1:58.27	
