= Andy González (runner) =

Cuban middle-distance runner (born 1987)

Personal information
- Full name: Andy González Núñez
- Born: 17 October 1987 (age 38) Plaza de la Revolución, Havana, Cuba
- Height: 1.82 m (6 ft 0 in)
- Weight: 70 kg (154 lb)

Sport
- Country: Cuba
- Sport: Athletics
Medal record
Men's athletics
Representing Cuba
Pan American Games
Gold medal – first place	2011 Guadalajara	800 m
Central American and Caribbean Games
Gold medal – first place	2006 Cartagena	800 m
Gold medal – first place	2014 Xalapa	800 m
Gold medal – first place	2014 Xalapa	1500 m
CAC Championships
Gold medal – first place	2008 Cali	800 m
Gold medal – first place	2011 Mayagüez	800 m
Gold medal – first place	2013 Morelia	800 m
Silver medal – second place	2009 Havana	800 m
- Updated on 12 August 2015

Andy González Núñez (born 17 October 1987) is a Cuban middle-distance runner who competes in the 800 metres. He was the gold medalist in the event at the 2011 Pan American Games. He represented his country at the 2008 and 2012 Summer Olympics.

== Biography ==
González emerged as an international level runner in 2006. That year he ran 1:47.5 minutes for the 800 m and a national junior record of 3:42.6 minutes for the 1500 metres. He was chosen to represent Cuba at the 2006 Central American and Caribbean Games and he surprised by winning the 800 m gold medal, defeating Sherridan Kirk and running a time of 1:46.26 minutes (the fastest ever by a Central American and Caribbean junior). He was one of the highest ranked runners to enter the 800 m at the 2006 World Junior Championships in Athletics, but he was off-form in the final and finished eighth in a time of 1:53.61 minutes.

The following year he competed at the 2007 Pan American Games and came fifth in the 800 m final – an event which was won by his more experienced compatriot Yeimer López. At the start of 2008 he ran a personal best of 1:45.3 minutes for the 800 m in Havana. He then set a championship record to win the event at the 2008 Ibero-American Championships in Athletics and achieved the same feat at the 2008 Central American and Caribbean Championships. González received his first call-up to the Cuban Olympic team and was narrowly eliminated in the first round of the 800 m – he was the fastest runner not to qualify.

In 2009, he came runner-up to Yeimer López at the national Barrientos Memorial meet in Havana. The city hosted the 2009 CAC Championships in July and an attempt to defend his 800 m title resulted in a duel between him and López, but González again finished behind his fellow Cuban. He improved his 1500 m running in 2010, taking the title at the Barrientos Memorial and finishing the year with a new personal best of 3:40.94 minutes. He also achieved a season's best of 1:45.40 minutes for the 800 m that year.

González returned to international competition in 2011 and had a highly successful year. He ran his season's best of 1:45.67 minutes at the Barrientos Memorial, although he was narrowly outrun to the title by the emerging Raidel Acea. The 2011 Central American and Caribbean Championships in Athletics saw him return to the top of the podium as he beat Haiti's Moise Joseph to win his second 800 m title at the competition. At the 2011 Pan American Games in October, he outran Brazil's Kleberson Davide in the final straight to claim his first major 800 m title. He competed in the 800 m at the 2013 World Athletics Championships. At the 2014 Central American and Caribbean Games, González did the 800 m and 1500 m double, winning both events.

== Personal best ==
- 400 m: 47.41 s – Havana, Cuba, 1 March 2014
- 800 m: 1:45.3 min (ht) – Havana, Cuba, 13 March 2008
- 1500 m: 3:42.4 min (ht) – Havana, Cuba, 15 March 2008
- 3000 m: 8:24.3 min (ht) – Santa Clara, Cuba, 3 April 2009

== Competition record ==
Year	Competition	Venue	Position	Event	Notes
Representing Cuba
2006	Central American and Caribbean Games	Cartagena, Colombia	1st	800 m	1:46.26 min
2006	Central American and Caribbean Games	Cartagena, Colombia	8th	1500 m	3:49.78 min
2006	World Junior Championships	Beijing, China	8th	800 m	1:53.61 min
2007	ALBA Games	Caracas, Venezuela	2nd	800 m	1:48.51 min
2007	Pan American Games	Rio de Janeiro, Brazil	5th	800 m	1:47.06 min
2007	Universiade	Bangkok, Thailand	23rd (h)	800 m	1:52.11 min
2008	Ibero-American Championships	Iquique, Chile	1st	800 m	1:47.59 min
2008	Central American and Caribbean Championships	Cali, Colombia	1st	800 m	1:46.11 min
2008	Olympic Games	Beijing, China	17th (h)	800 m	1:46.59 min
2009	ALBA Games	Havana, Cuba	4th	800 m	1:48.11 min
2009	ALBA Games	Havana, Cuba	5th	1500 m	3:56.05 min
2009	Central American and Caribbean Championships	Havana, Cuba	2nd	800 m	1:46.62 min
2011	Central American and Caribbean Championships	Mayagüez, Puerto Rico	1st	800 m	1:48.15 min
2011	Pan American Games	Guadalajara, Mexico	1st	800 m	1:45.58 min
2012	Ibero-American Championships	Barquisimeto, Venezuela	1st	800 m	1:46.91 min
2012	Olympic Games	London, United Kingdom	23rd (sf)	800 m	1:53.46 min
2013	Central American and Caribbean Championships	Morelia, Mexico	1st	800 m	1:49.54 min
2013	World Championships	Moscow, Russia	16th (h)	800 m	1:46.80 min
2014	Pan American Sports Festival	Mexico City, Mexico	1st	800m	1:49.61 A
2014	Central American and Caribbean Games	Xalapa, Mexico	1st	800m	1:45.73 A
2014	Central American and Caribbean Games	Xalapa, Mexico	1st	1500m	3:45.52 A
2015	Pan American Games	Toronto, Canada	13th (h)	800m	1:51.14 min
2015	Pan American Games	Toronto, Canada	11th	1500m	3:49.06
2018	Central American and Caribbean Games	Barranquilla, Colombia	8th	1500 m	4:01.90
