= 2007 World Championships in Athletics – Men's 800 metres =

The men's 800 metres at the 2007 World Championships in Athletics was held at the Nagai Stadium on 30, 31 August and 2 September.

== Medalists ==
Gold	Silver	Bronze
Alfred Kirwa Yego; Kenya	Gary Reed; Canada	Yuriy Borzakovskiy; Russia

== Records ==
Prior to the competition, the following records were as follows.

World record	Wilson Kipketer (DEN)	1:41.11	Cologne, Germany	24 August 1997
Championship record	Billy Konchellah (KEN)	1:43.06	Rome, Italy	1 September 1987
World leading	Mbulaeni Mulaudzi (RSA)	1:43.74	Monaco	25 July 2007

== Schedule ==
Date	Time	Round
August 30, 2007	19:40	Heats
August 31, 2007	20:05	Semifinals
September 2, 2007	19:55	Final

== Results ==
KEY:	q	Fastest non-qualifiers	Q	Qualified	WR	World record	AR	Area record	NR	National record	PB	Personal best	SB	Seasonal best

=== Heats ===
Qualification: First 3 in each heat(Q) and the next 6 fastest(q) advance to the semifinals.

Rank	Heat	Name	Nationality	Time	Notes
1	6	Yusuf Saad Kamel	Bahrain	1:45.25	Q
2	4	Alfred Kirwa Yego	Kenya	1:45.52	Q, SB
3	3	Mbulaeni Mulaudzi	South Africa	1:45.56	Q
4	5	Mohammed Al-Salhi	Saudi Arabia	1:45.58	Q
5	3	Rashid Ramzi	Bahrain	1:45.64	Q, SB
6	3	Dmitriy Bogdanov	Russia	1:45.66	Q
6	4	Michael Rimmer	United Kingdom	1:45.66	Q
8	6	Abraham Chepkirwok	Uganda	1:45.68	Q
9	4	Dmitrijs Miļkevičs	Latvia	1:45.72	Q
10	3	Fabiano Peçanha	Brazil	1:45.77	q
11	4	Khadevis Robinson	United States	1:45.78	q
12	5	Yuriy Borzakovskiy	Russia	1:45.79	Q
13	5	Wilfred Bungei	Kenya	1:45.79	Q
14	6	Mohammad Al-Azemi	Kuwait	1:45.85	Q
15	4	Manuel Olmedo	Spain	1:45.90	q
15	5	Yassine Bensghir	Morocco	1:45.90	q, SB
17	1	Amine Laâlou	Morocco	1:46.00	Q
17	2	Gary Reed	Canada	1:46.00	Q
19	2	Nabil Madi	Algeria	1:46.02	Q
20	2	Justus Koech	Kenya	1:46.08	Q
21	1	Nick Symmonds	United States	1:46.16	Q
21	6	Mouhssin Chehibi	Morocco	1:46.16	q
23	1	Kléberson Davide	Brazil	1:46.17	Q
24	5	Abdoulaye Wagne	Senegal	1:46.20	q
25	6	Samwel Mwera	Tanzania	1:46.24	SB
26	3	Yeimer López	Cuba	1:46.28	
27	4	Eduard Villanueva	Venezuela	1:46.33	PB
28	1	Belal Mansoor Ali	Bahrain	1:46.34	
29	2	Antonio Manuel Reina	Spain	1:46.35	
30	5	Abubaker Kaki Khamis	Sudan	1:46.38	
31	3	Mattias Claesson	Sweden	1:46.43	PB
32	4	David Campbell	Ireland	1:46.47	
33	6	Jozef Repcìk	Slovakia	1:46.53	
34	3	Eugenio Barrios	Spain	1:46.62	
35	1	Achraf Tadili	Canada	1:46.73	
36	1	Sajjad Moradi	Iran	1:46.75	
37	3	Bram Som	Netherlands	1:46.81	
38	5	Masato Yokota	Japan	1:47.16	PB
39	2	Arnoud Okken	Netherlands	1:47.23	
40	2	Jeffrey Riseley	Australia	1:47.44	
41	2	Aunese Curreen	Samoa	1:47.72	NR
42	4	Fadrique Iglesias	Bolivia	1:48.42	
43	6	Duane Solomon	United States	1:48.95	
44	5	Mahamoud Farah	Djibouti	1:49.06	
45	6	Souleymane Ould Chebal	Mauritania	1:56.45	SB
46	1	Mohammed Ahmed Al-Yafaee	Yemen	1:56.55	
	1	Ismail Ahmed Ismail	Sudan		DNF
	2	Ivan Heshko	Ukraine		DNS

=== Semifinals ===
Qualification: First 2 in each semifinal (Q) and the next 2 fastest (q) advance to the final.

Rank	Heat	Name	Nationality	Time	Notes
1	1	Alfred Kirwa Yego	Kenya	1:44.54	Q, SB
2	1	Mbulaeni Mulaudzi	South Africa	1:44.71	Q
3	1	Abraham Chepkirwok	Uganda	1:44.84	q
4	2	Gary Reed	Canada	1:44.92	Q
5	2	Amine Laâlou	Morocco	1:45.11	Q
6	3	Yuriy Borzakovskiy	Russia	1:45.12	Q
7	3	Wilfred Bungei	Kenya	1:45.20	Q
8	3	Mohammed Al-Salhi	Saudi Arabia	1:45.23	q
9	3	Yusuf Saad Kamel	Bahrain	1:45.31	
10	2	Dmitriy Bogdanov	Russia	1:45.36	SB
11	1	Khadevis Robinson	United States	1:45.45	
12	2	Nabil Madi	Algeria	1:45.59	
13	2	Manuel Olmedo	Spain	1:45.61	
14	1	Fabiano Peçanha	Brazil	1:45.95	
15	1	Dmitrijs Miļkevičs	Latvia	1:46.27	
16	2	Nick Symmonds	United States	1:46.41	
17	3	Kléberson Davide	Brazil	1:46.45	
18	1	Abdoulaye Wagne	Senegal	1:46.49	
19	2	Justus Koech	Kenya	1:46.86	
20	3	Michael Rimmer	United Kingdom	1:47.39	
21	2	Rashid Ramzi	Bahrain	1:47.76	
22	3	Yassine Bensghir	Morocco	1:48.04	
23	3	Mohammad Al-Azemi	Kuwait	1:50.28	
24	1	Mouhssin Chehibi	Morocco	1:51.31	

=== Final ===
Rank	Name	Nationality	Time	Notes
1st place, gold medalist(s)	Alfred Kirwa Yego	Kenya	1:47.09	
2nd place, silver medalist(s)	Gary Reed	Canada	1:47.10	
3rd place, bronze medalist(s)	Yuriy Borzakovskiy	Russia	1:47.39	
4	Abraham Chepkirwok	Uganda	1:47.41	
5	Wilfred Bungei	Kenya	1:47.42	
6	Amine Laâlou	Morocco	1:47.45	
7	Mbulaeni Mulaudzi	South Africa	1:47.52	
8	Mohammed Al-Salhi	Saudi Arabia	1:47.58	
