= Eduar Villanueva =

Venezuelan middle-distance runner (born 1984)

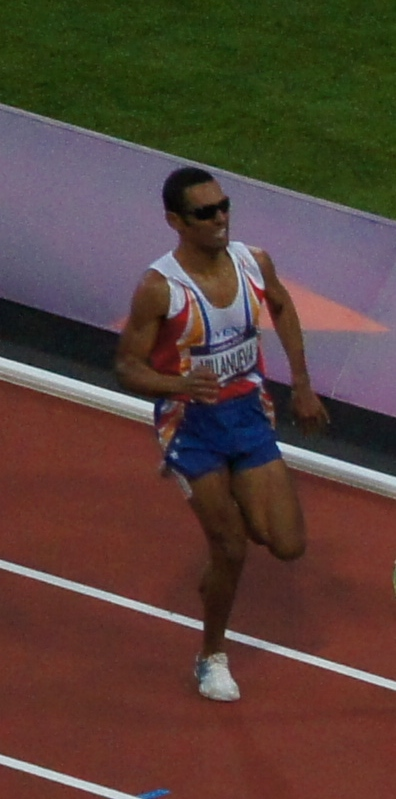
- Villanueva at the 2012 Summer Olympics

Personal information
- Full name: Eduar Antonio Villanueva
- Born: 29 December 1984 (age 41) Barquisimeto, Lara, Venezuela
- Height: 1.72 m (5 ft 8 in)
- Weight: 65 kg (143 lb)

Sport
- Country: Venezuela
- Sport: Track
- Events: 800 metres, 1500 metres

Achievements and titles
- Personal bests: 800 metres: 1:46.33; 1500 metres: 3:36.96
Medal record
Men's athletics
Representing Venezuela
Pan American Games
Bronze medal – third place	2011 Guadalajara	1500 m
Central American and Caribbean Games
Gold medal – first place	2010 Mayagüez	800 m
Silver medal – second place	2010 Mayagüez	1500 m
South American Championships
Bronze medal – third place	2007 São Paulo	1500 m
Bronze medal – third place	2009 Lima	1500 m
CAC Championships
Gold medal – first place	2009 Havana	1500 m
Silver medal – second place	2008 Cali	800 m
- Updated on 19 June 2013

Eduar Antonio Villanueva (born 29 December 1984) is a Venezuelan middle-distance runner. He represented his country at the 2008 Summer Olympics and 2012 Summer Olympics and has participated in the World Championships in Athletics on three consecutive occasions (2007, 2009, 2011). In 2011 he had the best ever performance by a Venezuelan runner at the World Championships, coming eighth in the 1500 metres. He set a Venezuelan record of 3:36.96 minutes in the semi-final.

In regional competition, Villanueva is a two-time bronze medallist at the South American Championships in Athletics and has won a gold medal at both the Central American and Caribbean Games and the Central American and Caribbean Championships. He was a participant at the 2007 Pan American Games.

== Running career ==
Born in Barquisimeto, Lara, he won his first international medal at the 2004 South American Under-23 Championships held in his hometown, where he took the 5000 metres bronze medal. He ran in the 1500 metres at the 2005 Bolivarian Games and set a personal best of 3:46.32 minutes, finishing in fourth place.

The 2006 season saw him establish himself as a senior athlete. He was third in the 800 metres at the 2006 Ibero-American Championships, won his first national title over 1500 m, and represented Venezuela at the 2006 Central American and Caribbean Games. At the Games he ran two personal bests: 1:48.21 min for fifth in the 800 m and 3:44.27 min for fourth in the 1500 m. He came fifth in the 800 m in his senior continental debut at the 2006 South American Championships in Athletics. He won two medals at the 2006 South American Under-23 event, winning the 1500 m and coming a close second to Brazil's Kléberson Davide in the shorter race.

At the 2007 South American Championships in Athletics he won his first medal on the continental stage, securing the bronze medal behind Byron Piedra and Leandro de Oliveira. Villanueva was chosen to run for his nation at the 2007 Pan American Games and came sixth in the 1500 m with a personal best of 3:41.74 min and ended the competition by running an 800 m best of 1:48.05 min in the heats of that event. He gained selection for the Venezuelan team at the 2007 World Championships in Athletics held the following month and he improved his 800 m best further by running a time of 1:46.33 min in the heats.

In 2008 Villanueva made his global indoor debut at the 2008 IAAF World Indoor Championships and also ran at the Olympics for the first time, competing in the heats of the 800 m at the 2008 Beijing Games. He was the 800 m silver medallist at the 2008 Central American and Caribbean Championships, finishing behind Cuba's Andy González. At the World Military Track and Field Championships in June 2009, he came fourth in the 1500 m. Villanueva won a consecutive 1500 m bronze at the 2009 South American Championships in Athletics, but was the gold medallist in the event at the 2009 CAC Championships. He was selected to run the 800 m at the 2009 World Championships in Athletics (although he had focused on the longer distance regionally) and was eliminated in the first round.

Villanueva was runner-up to Spain's David Bustos in the 1500 m at the 2010 Ibero-American Championships. He broke José López's 14-year-old Venezuelan record in the 1500 m with a run of 3:38.96 min in Barakaldo. The 2010 CAC Games saw him beat Moise Joseph to the 800 m gold medal and finish with a silver medal in the 1500 m behind Juan Luis Barrios.

He focused more on the 1500 m in 2011 and spent much of the season based in Spain with his coach Mariano Gonzalo. Villanueva improved his 1500 m national record to 3:38.29 minutes at a meeting in Barcelona in July 2011 and gained selection for the 2011 World Championships in Athletics in Daegu, South Korea. At the competition, he qualified for the 1500 m final by running a personal best of 3:36.96 min in the semi-finals. In the final he finished in eighth place, which was the best ever performance by a Venezuelan track runner at the world championships (improving upon William Wuycke's run in 1987).

== Personal bests ==
Outdoor

- 800 m: 1:46.33 min – Osaka, Japan, 30 August 2007
- 1500 m: 3:36.96 min – Daegu, South Korea, 1 September 2011
- 3000 m: 8:13.12 min – Valparaíso, Chile, 22 April 2007

Indoor

- 800 m: 1:49.75 min – Valencia, Spain, 9 February 2008

== Achievements ==
Year	Competition	Venue	Position	Event	Notes
Representing Venezuela
2004	South American Under-23 Championships	Barquisimeto, Venezuela	3rd	5000 m	15:52.40 min
2005	Bolivarian Games	Armenia, Colombia	4th	1500 m	3:46.32 min A
2006	Ibero-American Championships	Ponce, Puerto Rico	3rd	800 m	1:48.31 min
2006	Ibero-American Championships	Ponce, Puerto Rico	6th	1500 m	3:48.72 min
2006	Central American and Caribbean Games	Cartagena, Colombia	5th	800 m	1:48.21 min
2006	Central American and Caribbean Games	Cartagena, Colombia	4th	1500 m	3:44.27 min
2006	South American Championships	Tunja, Colombia	5th	800 m	1:52.91 min A
2006	South American Under-23 Championships / South American Games	Buenos Aires, Argentina	2nd	800 m	1:51.24 min
2006	South American Under-23 Championships / South American Games	Buenos Aires, Argentina	1st	1500 m	3:51.54 min
2007	ALBA Games	Caracas, Venezuela	3rd	1500 m	3:46.22 min
2007	South American Championships	São Paulo, Brazil	3rd	1500 m	3:43.40 min
2007	Pan American Games	Rio de Janeiro, Brazil	8th (h)	800 m	1:48.05 min
2007	Pan American Games	Rio de Janeiro, Brazil	6th	1500 m	3:41.74 min
2007	World Championships	Osaka, Japan	6th (h)	800 m	1:46.33 min
2008	World Indoor Championships	Valencia, Spain	15th (h)	800 m	1:51.83 min
2008	Ibero-American Championships	Iquique, Chile	6th	800 m	1:49.84 min
2008	Ibero-American Championships	Iquique, Chile	5th	1500 m	3:43.59 min
2008	Central American and Caribbean Championships	Cali, Colombia	2nd	800 m	1:46.92 min A
2008	Olympic Games	Beijing, China	6th (h)	800 m	1:47.64 min
2009	ALBA Games	Havana, Cuba	3rd	800 m	1:48.01 min
2009	ALBA Games	Havana, Cuba	3rd	1500 m	3:45.47 min
2009	World Military Championships	Sofia, Bulgaria	4th (h)	800 m	1:50.99 min
2009	World Military Championships	Sofia, Bulgaria	4th	1500 m	3:46.14 min
2009	South American Championships	Lima, Peru	3rd	1500 m	3:43.23
2009	Central American and Caribbean Championships	Havana, Cuba	1st	1500 m	3:42.23 min
2009	World Championships	Berlin, Germany	6th (h)	800 m	1:48.61
2010	Ibero-American Championships	San Fernando, Spain	2nd	1500 m	3:43.72 min
2010	Central American and Caribbean Games	Mayagüez, Puerto Rico	1st	800 m	1:47.73 min
2010	Central American and Caribbean Games	Mayagüez, Puerto Rico	2nd	1500 m	3:45.04 min
2011	World Championships	Daegu, South Korea	8th	1500 m	3:37.31 min
2011	Pan American Games	Guadalajara, Mexico	3rd	1500 m	3:54.06 min
2012	Ibero-American Championships	Barquisimeto, Venezuela	5th	1500 m	3:49.17 min
2012	Olympic Games	London, United Kingdom	11th (h)	1500 m	3:43.11 min
