= 2006 IAAF World Indoor Championships – Men's 800 metres =

The Men's 800 metres event at the 2006 IAAF World Indoor Championships was held on 10–12 March 2006.

The winning margin was 0.01 seconds which as of July 2024 remains the only time the men's 800 metres has been won by less than 0.02 seconds at these championships.

== Medalists ==
Gold	Silver	Bronze
Wilfred Bungei; Kenya	Mbulaeni Mulaudzi; South Africa	Yuriy Borzakovskiy; Russia

== Results ==
=== Heats ===
First 2 of each heat (Q) and the next 2 fastest (q) qualified for the semifinals.

Rank	Heat	Name	Nationality	Time	Notes
1	2	Dmitrijs Miļkevičs	Latvia	1:47.19	Q
2	2	Amine Laalou	Morocco	1:47.36	Q, SB
3	2	Arnoud Okken	Netherlands	1:47.58	q, SB
4	2	Abdulrahman Suleiman	Qatar	1:47.74	q, NR
5	4	Juan de Dios Jurado	Spain	1:47.88	Q, SB
6	4	Wilfred Bungei	Kenya	1:47.95	Q
7	1	Yuriy Borzakovskiy	Russia	1:48.08	Q
8	1	James Watkins	Great Britain	1:48.20	Q, PB
9	4	Osmar dos Santos	Brazil	1:48.30	
10	4	Moise Joseph	Haiti	1:48.33	
11	5	Khadevis Robinson	United States	1:48.73	Q
12	5	Eugenio Barrios	Spain	1:48.79	Q
13	5	Belal Mansoor Ali	Bahrain	1:48.84	
14	5	Antoine Martiak	France	1:48.97	
15	3	Mbulaeni Mulaudzi	South Africa	1:49.03	Q, SB
16	3	Ramil Aritkulov	Russia	1:49.09	Q
17	3	David Krummenacker	United States	1:49.15	
18	1	Majed Saeed Sultan	Qatar	1:49.21	
19	1	Joseph Mwengi Mutua	Kenya	1:49.49	
20	3	Dávid Takács	Hungary	1:49.61	
21	1	Mouhssin Chehibi	Morocco	1:49.84	
22	2	Fadrique Iglesias	Bolivia	1:50.65	NR
23	3	Berhanu Alemu	Ethiopia	1:51.07	
24	5	Sajad Moradi	Iran	1:51.67	SB
25	4	Glauco Martini	San Marino	1:59.25	

=== Semifinals ===
First 3 of each semifinal qualified directly (Q) for the final.

Rank	Heat	Name	Nationality	Time	Notes
1	1	Mbulaeni Mulaudzi	South Africa	1:46.82	Q, SB
2	2	Wilfred Bungei	Kenya	1:46.90	Q
3	1	Yuriy Borzakovskiy	Russia	1:47.09	Q
4	2	Dmitrijs Miļkevičs	Latvia	1:47.23	Q
5	2	James Watkins	Great Britain	1:47.23	Q, PB
6	1	Juan de Dios Jurado	Spain	1:47.38	Q, PB
7	2	Ramil Aritkulov	Russia	1:47.50	
8	1	Amine Laalou	Morocco	1:47.55	
9	2	Arnoud Okken	Netherlands	1:47.68	
10	1	Abdulrahman Suleiman	Qatar	1:47.87	
11	1	Khadevis Robinson	United States	1:48.30	
12	2	Eugenio Barrios	Spain	1:52.75	

=== Final ===
Rank	Name	Nationality	Time	Notes
1st place, gold medalist(s)	Wilfred Bungei	Kenya	1:47.15	
2nd place, silver medalist(s)	Mbulaeni Mulaudzi	South Africa	1:47.16	
3rd place, bronze medalist(s)	Yuriy Borzakovskiy	Russia	1:47.38	
4	Dmitrijs Miļkevičs	Latvia	1:48.01	
5	Juan de Dios Jurado	Spain	1:48.44	
6	James Watkins	Great Britain	1:48.56	
