= 2009 World Championships in Athletics – Men's 800 metres =

The men's 800 metres at the 2009 World Championships in Athletics was held at the Olympic Stadium on 20, 21 and 23 August.

In the first semifinals heat, Marcin Lewandowski fell over Bram Som who had tripped over Abubaker Kaki, who had fallen on his own account. After a protest, both Lewandowski and Som were allowed to compete in the final. With the extra athletes on the track the two time qualifiers, Alfred Kirwa Yego in lane 1 and Mbulaeni Mulaudzi in lane 8, had to share their lanes with Som in 1 and Lewandowski in 8. None of the people sharing lanes conceded space, Som leading Yego around the outside of the turn effectively boxing out Yego, Yusuf Saad Kamel and Yeimer López. With typically slow starters Nick Symmonds and Yuriy Borzakovskiy in the middle lanes, Som had a free run from the inside but Mulaudzi, Lewandowski and Amine Laâlou a strong wave from the outside to take the lead. Atypically, neither Symmonds nor Borzakovskiy were content to take the rear, both working their way through the crowd to join Mulaudzi at the front of the pack by the end of the first lap, exchanging arms and elbows in the process. Lewandowski was boxed in by the action on the outside and began to fall back through the pack while Symmonds took a strong position on Mulaudzi's shoulder, Laâlou right behind Mulaudzi with Som in their wake. Everyone held position on the backstretch save Borzakovskiy who noticeably fell back to behind Lewandowski on the back of the pack, which would be the normal place Borzakovskiy would launch his finishing kick, but not after losing so much ground. From the back group, through the final turn, Kamel went to the outside and started passing people, followed by Yego and then Borzakovskiy doing the same thing. Yego pulled out to lane 3 for running room, Borzakovskiy to lane 4, Kamel, Yego and Borzakovskiy, moving faster than the others ahead of them. Symmonds held second place until Kamel passed him, then the wind went out of his sails. Laâlou edged ahead but was getting passed by the rush. Mulaudzi was able to lean over the line in first, falling flat on his face just past the finish line. Yeo and Kamel crossed together with Yego getting the photo finish nod for silver. Borzakovskiy caught everyone else but ran out of track to get into the medals.

== Medalists ==
Gold	Silver	Bronze
Mbulaeni Mulaudzi; South Africa	Alfred Kirwa Yego; Kenya	Yusuf Saad Kamel; Bahrain

== Records ==
Prior to the competition, the following records were as follows.

World record	Wilson Kipketer (DEN)	1:41.11	Cologne, Germany	24 August 1997
Championship record	Billy Konchellah (KEN)	1:43.06	Rome, Italy	1 September 1987
World leading	Abubaker Kaki Khamis (SUD)	1:43.09	Doha, Qatar	8 May 2009
African record	Sammy Koskei (KEN)	1:42.28	Cologne, Germany	26 August 1984
Asian record	Yusuf Saad Kamel (BHR)	1:42.79	Monaco	29 July 2008
North American record	Johnny Gray (USA)	1:42.60	Koblenz, West Germany	28 August 1985
South American record	Joaquim Cruz (BRA)	1:41.77	Cologne, Germany	26 August 1984
European record	Wilson Kipketer (DEN)	1:41.11	Cologne, Germany	24 August 1997
Oceanian record	Peter Snell (NZL)	1:44.3	Christchurch, New Zealand	3 February 1962

== Qualification standards ==
A time	B time
1:45.40	1:46.60

== Schedule ==
Date	Time	Round
20 August 2009	11:45	Heats
21 August 2009	20:30	Semifinals
23 August 2009	17:25	Final

== Results ==
=== Heats ===
Qualification: First 3 in each heat (Q) and the next 3 fastest (q) advance to the semi-finals.

Rank	Heat	Name	Nationality	Time	Notes
1	3	Gary Reed	Canada	1:45.76	Q
2	3	Yuriy Borzakovskiy	Russia	1:45.86	Q
3	7	Jackson Mumbwa Kivuva	Kenya	1:46.17	Q
4	3	Jeff Lastennet	France	1:46.30	Q, PB
5	7	Bram Som	Netherlands	1:46.33	Q
6	7	Amine Laâlou	Morocco	1:46.38	Q
7	1	Mbulaeni Mulaudzi	South Africa	1:46.40	Q
8	1	Abubaker Kaki Khamis	Sudan	1:46.41	Q
9	4	Yusuf Saad Kamel	Bahrain	1:46.43	Q, SB
10	4	Asbel Kiprop	Kenya	1:46.52	Q
11	3	Samson Ngoepe	South Africa	1:46.54	q
12	1	Fabiano Peçanha	Brazil	1:46.68	Q
12	7	Moise Joseph	Haiti	1:46.68	q
14	7	Adam Kszczot	Poland	1:46.70	q
15	4	Khadevis Robinson	United States	1:46.79	Q
16	7	Dmitrijs Jurkevics	Latvia	1:46.90	SB
17	3	Ryan Brown	United States	1:46.92	
18	4	Lukas Rifesser	Italy	1:47.07	
19	2	Nick Symmonds	United States	1:47.12	Q
20	2	Belal Mansoor Ali	Bahrain	1:47.16	Q
21	2	Ismail Ahmed Ismail	Sudan	1:47.20	Q
22	4	Kléberson Davide	Brazil	1:47.51	
23	1	Sajjad Moradi	Iran	1:47.68	SB
24	6	David Rudisha	Kenya	1:47.83	Q
25	7	Pablo Solares	Mexico	1:47.96	SB
26	2	Mattias Claesson	Sweden	1:48.02	
27	6	Yeimer López	Cuba	1:48.04	Q
28	2	Thomas Chamney	Ireland	1:48.09	
29	2	Prince Mumba	Zambia	1:48.13	
30	3	Mike Schumacher	Luxembourg	1:48.18	PB
31	6	Michael Rimmer	Great Britain & N.I.	1:48.20	Q
32	6	Abdoulaye Wagne	Senegal	1:48.22	
33	4	Mahamoud Farah	Djibouti	1:48.23	
34	5	Alfred Kirwa Yego	Kenya	1:48.32	Q
35	5	Tamás Kazi	Hungary	1:48.40	Q
36	5	Marcin Lewandowski	Poland	1:48.41	Q
37	5	Mohammed Al-Salhi	Saudi Arabia	1:48.43	
37	6	Dmitrijs Miļkevičs	Latvia	1:48.43	
39	5	Luis Alberto Marco	Spain	1:48.47	
40	1	Abraham Chepkirwok	Uganda	1:48.57	
41	1	Eduard Villanueva	Venezuela	1:48.61	
42	5	Jozef Repcìk	Slovakia	1:48.73	
43	6	Mohammad Al-Azemi	Kuwait	1:51.73	
44	5	Evans Pinto	Bolivia	1:52.23	
45	2	Ilija Ranitović	Montenegro	1:53.17	
46	3	Robin Schembera	Germany	1:54.47	
47	5	Arnold Sorina	Vanuatu	2:00.13	SB
48	2	Iulio Lafai	Samoa	2:03.51	SB
	1	Manuel Olmedo	Spain	DNF	
	4	Ali Al-Deraan	Saudi Arabia	DNS	
	6	Nadjim Manseur	Algeria	DNS	

Key: NR = National record, Q = qualification by place in heat, q = qualification by overall place, SB = Seasonal best

=== Semifinals ===
Qualification: First 2 in each semifinal (Q) and the next 2 fastest (q) advance to the final.

Rank	Heat	Name	Nationality	Time	Notes
1	2	Yusuf Saad Kamel	Bahrain	1:45.01	Q, SB
2	2	Yuriy Borzakovskiy	Russia	1:45.16	Q
3	2	Alfred Kirwa Yego	Kenya	1:45.22	q, SB
4	2	Mbulaeni Mulaudzi	South Africa	1:45.26	q
5	3	Amine Laâlou	Morocco	1:45.27	Q
6	3	Yeimer López	Cuba	1:45.33	Q
7	3	David Rudisha	Kenya	1:45.40	
8	3	Gary Reed	Canada	1:45.60	
9	3	Moise Joseph	Haiti	1:45.87	SB
10	2	Khadevis Robinson	United States	1:45.91	
11	3	Fabiano Peçanha	Brazil	1:45.94	
12	1	Nick Symmonds	United States	1:45.96	Q
13	1	Jackson Mumbwa Kivuva	Kenya	1:46.32	Q
14	2	Adam Kszczot	Poland	1:46.33	
15	1	Belal Mansoor Ali	Bahrain	1:46.57	
16	3	Michael Rimmer	Great Britain & N.I.	1:46.77	
17	1	Tamás Kazi	Hungary	1:47.01	
18	3	Samson Ngoepe	South Africa	1:49.03	
19	2	Asbel Kiprop	Kenya	1:52.05	
20	1	Jeff Lastennet	France	1:57.43	
21	1	Marcin Lewandowski	Poland	2:01.62	X
	1	Abubaker Kaki Khamis	Sudan	DNF	
	1	Bram Som	Netherlands	DNF	X
	2	Ismail Ahmed Ismail	Sudan	DNF	

X: In the first semifinals heat, Marcin Lewandowski fell over Bram Som who had tripped over Abubaker Kaki, who had fallen on his own account. After a protest, both Lewandowski and Som were allowed to compete in the final.

=== Final ===
Rank	Name	Nationality	Time	Notes
1st place, gold medalist(s)	Mbulaeni Mulaudzi	South Africa	1:45.29	
2nd place, silver medalist(s)	Alfred Kirwa Yego	Kenya	1:45.35	
3rd place, bronze medalist(s)	Yusuf Saad Kamel	Bahrain	1:45.35	
4	Yuriy Borzakovskiy	Russia	1:45.57	
5	Amine Laâlou	Morocco	1:45.66	
6	Nick Symmonds	United States	1:45.71	
7	Bram Som	Netherlands	1:45.86	
8	Marcin Lewandowski	Poland	1:46.17	
9	Jackson Mumbwa Kivuva	Kenya	1:46.39	
10	Yeimer López	Cuba	1:47.80	
