= 2002 African Championships in Athletics – Men's 800 metres =

The men's 800 metres event at the 2002 African Championships in Athletics was held in Radès, Tunisia on August 9–10.

== Medalists ==
Gold	Silver	Bronze
Djabir Saïd-Guerni; Algeria	William Yiampoy; Kenya	Mbulaeni Mulaudzi; South Africa

== Results ==
=== Heats ===
Rank	Heat	Name	Nationality	Time	Notes
1	2	William Yiampoy	Kenya	1:47.22	Q
2	2	Arthémon Hatungimana	Burundi	1:47.84	Q
3	3	Khalid Tighazouine	Morocco	1:47.89	Q
4	2	Otukile Lekote	Botswana	1:48.16	q
5	3	Mbulaeni Mulaudzi	South Africa	1:48.49	Q
6	3	Berhanu Alemu	Ethiopia	1:48.55	q
7	2	Amine Laâlou	Morocco	1:48.68	
8	3	Nicholas Wachira	Kenya	1:48.74	
9	2	Nabil Madi	Algeria	1:48.87	
10	3	Ismail Ahmed Ismail	Sudan	1:49.18	
11	1	Djabir Saïd-Guerni	Algeria	1:50.18	Q
12	1	Mouhssin Chehibi	Morocco	1:50.21	Q
13	1	Wilfred Bungei	Kenya	1:51.21	
14	1	Gezahegn Alemu	Ethiopia	1:52.36	
15	3	Ghirmay Tikabo	Eritrea	1:52.58	
16	3	Joseph Kagisye	Burundi	1:53.06	
17	1	Francis Asamoah	Ghana	1:53.97	
18	2	Mathias Syndayihebura	Burundi	1:55.20	
19	1	Ibrahim Ofangobi	Benin	1:55.51	
20	1	Kursley Montimerdo	Mauritius	1:55.87	
21	2	Abdulahi Yahye	Somalia	1:58.20	
22	2	Manuel Marques	Angola	1:59.70	
23	3	Faisal Mohamed	Somalia	2:05.04	

=== Final ===
Rank	Name	Nationality	Time	Notes
1st place, gold medalist(s)	Djabir Saïd-Guerni	Algeria	1:45.52	
2nd place, silver medalist(s)	William Yiampoy	Kenya	1:45.79	
3rd place, bronze medalist(s)	Mbulaeni Mulaudzi	South Africa	1:46.20	
4	Mouhssin Chehibi	Morocco	1:47.15	
5	Khalid Tighazouine	Morocco	1:47.74	
6	Berhanu Alemu	Ethiopia	1:48.54	
7	Arthémon Hatungimana	Burundi	1:51.27	
	Otukile Lekote	Botswana	DNS	
