= 2005 World Championships in Athletics – Men's 800 metres =

The men's 800 metres at the 2005 World Championships in Athletics was held on August 11, 12 and 14 at the Helsinki Olympic Stadium.

Belal Mansoor Ali took the field through the first 400 in 52.48. Kicker Yuriy Borzakovskiy went to the back of the pack, but uncharacteristically moved to the front near the end of the first lap. But the entire field was jostling for position, with Wilfred Bungei elbowing his way to the lead and the entire field scrambling for position, and suddenly Borzakovskiy found himself in seventh place again after expending the effort to get a better position. Djabir Saïd-Guerni led the chase through the final turn, with William Yiampoy on his heels. Through the turn, Rashid Ramzi went around the outside, passing Saïd-Guerni as they hit the home stretch. Saïd-Guerni faded allowing Yiampoy to pass him on the inside. Further back Borzakovskiy was dealing with traffic of Mehdi Baala and Ali still in sixth place coming off the final turn. Ramzi easily sprinted past Bungei and on to victory. Bungei was struggling to hold on to second with Yiampoy sneaking through, again on the inside. Borzakovskiy's late rush caught everybody else, passing Yiampoy just before the line but was too late to catch Ramzi. Three years later Ramzi was disqualified from the Olympics on a doping violation, but to date has been allowed to keep his previous medals.

== Medalists ==
Gold	Rashid Ramzi; Bahrain (BHR)
Silver	Yuriy Borzakovskiy; Russia (RUS)
Bronze	William Yiampoy; Kenya (KEN)

== Results ==
All times shown are in seconds.

AR area record | CR championship record | GR games record | NR national record | OR Olympic record | PB personal best | SB season best | WL world leading (in a given season)
DNS = did not start | DQ = disqualification | NM = no mark (i.e. no valid result) | Q = qualification by place in heat | q = qualification by overall place

=== Heats ===
August 11, 2005

==== Heat 1 ====
1. (Bahrain) Rashid Ramzi 1:46.17 Q
2. (United Kingdom) James McIlroy 1:46.44 Q
3. (South Africa) Mbulaeni Mulaudzi 1:46.85 Q
4. (Germany) René Herms 1:47.07 q
5. (Ethiopia) Berhanu Alemu 1:47.37 q (SB)
6. (Brazil) Osmar Barbosa dos Santos 1:47.74
7. (South Korea) Lee Jae-hoon 1:47.90 (SB)
8. (Belgium) Tom Omey 1:49.62
- (Sudan) Ismail Ahmed Ismail DNS

==== Heat 2 ====
1. (France) Mehdi Baala 1:46.57 Q
2. (Kenya) Wilfred Bungei 1:46.71 Q
3. (United States) Khadevis Robinson 1:46.74 Q
4. (Russia) Dmitriy Bogdanov 1:46.88 q
5. (Poland) Paweł Czapiewski 1:46.93 q
6. (Kuwait) Mohammad Al-Azemi 1:47.05 q (SB)
7. (Haiti) Moise Joseph 1:48.29
8. (Cuba) Yeimer López 1:52.24
- (Guinea-Bissau) Geramias da Silva DSQ

==== Heat 3 ====
1. (Russia) Yuriy Borzakovskiy 1:50.14 Q
2. (Kenya) William Yiampoy 1:50.14 Q
3. (Algeria) Djabir Saïd-Guerni 1:50.16 Q
4. (New Zealand) Jason Stewart 1:50.35
5. (Latvia) Dmitrijs Milkevics 1:50.44
6. (Brazil) Fabiano Peçanha 1:50.89
7. (Uganda) Paskar Owor 1:51.72 (SB)
8. (Paraguay) Rodrigo Trinidad 1:55.43
- (Tanzania) Samwel Mwera DSQ

==== Heat 4 ====
1. (Bahrain) Yusuf Saad Kamel 1:47.65 Q
2. (United States) David Krummenacker 1:47.82 Q
3. (Morocco) Mouhssin Chehibi 1:48.17 Q
4. (Kenya) Alfred Kirwa Yego 1:48.72
5. (Netherlands) Arnoud Okken 1:48.95
6. (Bolivia) Fadrique Iglesias 1:49.57
7. (Botswana) Onalenna Baloyi 1:50.18
- (Spain) Manuel Olmedo DNF

==== Heat 5 ====
1. (Spain) Antonio Manuel Reina 1:47.14 Q
2. (Canada) Gary Reed 1:47.23 Q
3. (Morocco) Amine Laalou 1:47.62 Q
4. (Switzerland) André Bucher 1:47.97
5. (Italy) Maurizio Bobbato 1:48.36
6. (Finland) Juha Kukkamo 1:48.69
7. (Trinidad and Tobago) Sherridan Kirk 1:48.77
8. (Zambia) Prince Mumba 1:49.10

==== Heat 6 ====
1. (Bahrain) Belal Mansoor Ali 1:47.16 Q
2. (Iran) Sajad Moradi 1:47.18 Q
3. (Saudi Arabia) Mohammed Al-Salhi 1:47.27 Q
4. (Spain) Eugenio Barrios 1:47.53 q
5. (Canada) Achraf Tadili 1:48.42
6. (Sweden) Rizak Dirshe 1:48.43
7. (United States) Kevin Hicks 1:50.00
- (Qatar) Majed Saeed Sultan DSQ

=== Semifinals ===
August 12, 2005

==== Heat 1 ====
1. (Russia) Yuriy Borzakovskiy 1:44.26 Q
2. (Bahrain) Rashid Ramzi 1:44.30 Q (PB)
3. (Kenya) William Yiampoy 1:44.51 q (SB)
4. (Algeria) Djabir Saïd-Guerni 1:44.80 q (SB)
5. (Morocco) Amine Laalou 1:45.05
6. (Kuwait) Mohammad Al-Azemi 1:48.02
7. (Spain) Eugenio Barrios 1:48.76
8. (United States) Khadevis Robinson 1:49.13

==== Heat 2 ====
1. (Bahrain) Belal Mansoor Ali 1:45.45 Q
2. (France) Mehdi Baala 1:45.50 Q
3. (South Africa) Mbulaeni Mulaudzi 1:45.73
4. (Poland) Paweł Czapiewski 1:46.33
5. (Russia) Dmitriy Bogdanov 1:46.83
6. (Spain) Antonio Manuel Reina 1:46.89
7. (Ethiopia) Berhanu Alemu 1:47.66
8. (Saudi Arabia) Mohammed Al-Salhi 1:47.97

==== Heat 3 ====
1. (Canada) Gary Reed 1:44.33 Q (NR)
2. (Kenya) Wilfred Bungei 1:44.41 Q
3. (Bahrain) Yusuf Saad Kamel 1:44.90
4. (Germany) René Herms 1:45.21
5. (Morocco) Mouhssin Chehibi 1:45.82
6. (Iran) Sajad Moradi 1:45.88 (NR)
7. (United Kingdom) James McIlroy 1:45.91 (SB)
8. (United States) David Krummenacker 1:46.76

=== Final ===
August 14, 2005

1. (Bahrain) Rashid Ramzi 1:44.24 (PB)
2. (Russia) Yuriy Borzakovskiy 1:44.51
3. (Kenya) William Yiampoy 1:44.55
4. (Kenya) Wilfred Bungei 1:44.98
5. (Algeria) Djabir Saïd-Guerni 1:45.31
6. (France) Mehdi Baala 1:45.32
7. (Bahrain) Belal Mansoor Ali 1:45.55
8. (Canada) Gary Reed 1:46.20
