= 2008 IAAF World Indoor Championships – Men's 800 metres =

The Men's 800 metres event at the 2008 IAAF World Indoor Championships was held between 7–9 March.

== Medalists ==
Gold
Abubaker Kaki	Sudan
Silver
Mbulaeni Mulaudzi	South Africa
Bronze
Yusuf Saad Kamel	Bahrain

== Heats ==
Heat	Lane	Name	Country	Mark	Q
1	6	Dmitriy Bogdanov	Russia	1:48.38	Q
1	2	Fabiano Peçanha	Brazil	1:49.03 PB	Q
1	4	Abdoulaye Wagne	Senegal	1:49.07 PB	q
1	5	Jozef Repcik	Slovakia	1:49.15	q
1	3	Michael Blackwood	Jamaica	1:52.69	
2	3	Yusuf Saad Kamel	Bahrain	1:48.71	Q
2	5	Abraham Chepkirwok	Uganda	1:48.80	Q
2	6	Dmitrijs Milkevics	Latvia	1:49.10	q
2	4	Mattias Claesson	Sweden	1:49.12	q
2	2	Fadrique Iglesias	Bolivia	1:50.55	
3	6	Mbulaeni Mulaudzi	South Africa	1:50.86	Q
3	3	Manuel Olmedo	Spain	1:51.07	Q
3	4	Jakub Holuša	Czech Republic	1:51.09	
3	5	Damien Moss	United Kingdom	1:51.39	
3	2	Eduard Villanueva	Venezuela	1:51.83	
4	5	Nick Symmonds	United States	1:49.30	Q
4	4	Lukas Rifesser	Italy	1:49.51	Q
4	1	Moise Joseph	Haiti	1:49.70 SB	
4	3	Aldwyn Sappleton	Jamaica	1:51.24	
4	6	Richard Kiplagat	Kenya	DSQ	
4	2	Lamine Bangoura	Guinea	DNF	
5	4	Robert Lathouwers	Netherlands	1:49.32	Q
5	5	Khadevis Robinson	United States	1:49.33	Q
5	3	Amine Laalou	Morocco	1:49.41	
5	6	Yuriy Koldin	Russia	1:49.60	
5	2	Deon Bascom	Guyana	1:55.88	
5	1	Florian Hilti	Liechtenstein	1:59.91 SB	
6	1	Abubaker Kaki	Sudan	1:47.80	Q
6	6	Eugenio Barrios	Spain	1:48.70	Q
6	3	Richard Hill	United Kingdom	1:49.06	q
6	4	Ehsan Mohajer Shojaei	Iran	1:49.14	q
6	2	Dávid Takács	Hungary	1:49.79 SB	

== Semifinals ==
Heat	Lane	Name	Country	Mark	Q
1	5	Dmitriy Bogdanov	Russia	1:46.83	Q
1	2	Yusuf Saad Kamel	Bahrain	1:46.88 PB	Q
1	4	Khadevis Robinson	United States	1:47.57	
1	3	Richard Hill	United Kingdom	1:47.82	
1	6	Manuel Olmedo	Spain	1:48.90	
1	1	Fabiano Peçanha	Brazil	1:49.63	
2	1	Mbulaeni Mulaudzi	South Africa	1:47.39 SB	Q
2	5	Abubaker Kaki	Sudan	1:47.41	Q
2	2	Robert Lathouwers	Netherlands	1:48.27 PB	
2	4	Abraham Chepkirwok	Uganda	1:48.30	
2	6	Mattias Claesson	Sweden	1:48.50	
2	3	Jozef Repcik	Slovakia	1:48.61	
3	5	Nick Symmonds	United States	1:48.43	Q
3	4	Dmitrijs Milkevics	Latvia	1:48.80	Q
3	3	Eugenio Barrios	Spain	1:49.02	
3	6	Ehsan Mohajer Shojaei	Iran	1:49.32	
3	1	Abdoulaye Wagne	Senegal	1:49.49	
3	2	Lukas Rifesser	Italy	1:51.20	

== Final ==
Heat	Lane	Name	Country	Mark
Gold medal	3	Abubaker Kaki	Sudan	1:44.81 WL
Silver medal	1	Mbulaeni Mulaudzi	South Africa	1:44.91 NR
Bronze medal	2	Yusuf Saad Kamel	Bahrain	1:45.26 AR
4	5	Dmitrijs Milkevics	Latvia	1:45.72 NR
5	4	Dmitriy Bogdanov	Russia	1:45.76 PB
6	6	Nick Symmonds	United States	1:46.48 PB

Intermediate	Athlete	Country	Mark
200m	Abubaker Kaki	Sudan	24.92
400m	Abubaker Kaki	Sudan	51.26
600m	Abubaker Kaki	Sudan	1:18.28
