= Athletics at the 2003 Summer Universiade – Men's 800 metres =

The men's 800 metres event at the 2003 Summer Universiade was held in Daegu, South Korea with the final on 27–30 August.

== Medalists ==
Gold	Silver	Bronze
Roman Oravec; Czech Republic	Ramil Aritkulov; Russia	Fabiano Peçanha; Brazil

== Results ==
=== Heats ===
Rank	Heat	Athlete	Nationality	Time	Notes
1	1	Roman Oravec	Czech Republic	1:48.82	Q
2	1	Walid Meliani	Algeria	1:49.09	Q
3	1	Mikhail Kolganov	Kazakhstan	1:49.51	q
4	5	Ioan Zaizan	Romania	1:49.52	Q
5	5	Ramil Aritkulov	Russia	1:49.60	Q
6	2	Fabio Lettieri	Italy	1:49.64	Q
7	2	Artyom Mastrov	Russia	1:49.76	Q
8	5	Christian Neunhauserer	Italy	1:49.92	q
9	2	Gareth Hyett	New Zealand	1:49.99	q
10	1	Daniel Ruiz	Spain	1:50.11	q
11	2	José Maldonado	Puerto Rico	1:50.56	q
12	5	Cho Jae-deuk	South Korea	1:50.73	q
13	2	Avetik Arakelyan	Armenia	1:51.75	NR
14	4	Eugenio Barrios	Spain	1:51.92	Q
15	4	Joel Kidger	Great Britain	1:51.98	Q
16	4	Lee Jae-hun	South Korea	1:51.99	
17	3	Roman Hanzel	Slovakia	1:52.12	Q
18	3	Fabiano Peçanha	Brazil	1:52.14	Q
19	3	Heleodoro Navarro	Mexico	1:52.22	
20	1	Harry Larubi	Uganda	1:52.64	
21	4	Aggelos Thomopoulos	Greece	1:54.42	
22	3	Kondwani Chiwina	Malawi	1:54.57	
23	1	Saeed Ali Al-Adhreai	Yemen	1:54.75	
24	5	Aunese Mika	Samoa	1:56.24	NJR
25	3	Abraham Khumalo	Swaziland	1:57.26	
26	3	So Hoi Nam	Hong Kong	1:58.50	
27	4	Que Yin Tik	Hong Kong	2:00.12	
28	4	Johnson Rukundo	Rwanda	2:01.03	
29	1	Cheong Man Fong	Macau	2:01.13	
30	2	Iao Kuan Un	Macau	2:01.35	
31	2	Mohammed Al-Azri	Oman	2:01.54	
32	4	Telguy Djibeng	Chad	2:10.29	
33	5	Majed Al-Bousafi	Oman	2:12.68	

=== Semifinals ===
Rank	Heat	Athlete	Nationality	Time	Notes
1	1	Ioan Zaizan	Romania	1:48.27	Q
2	1	Roman Oravec	Czech Republic	1:48.37	Q
3	1	Eugenio Barrios	Spain	1:48.49	Q
4	1	Artyom Mastrov	Russia	1:48.49	q
5	1	Fabiano Peçanha	Brazil	1:48.73	q
6	1	Gareth Hyett	New Zealand	1:48.85	
7	1	José Maldonado	Puerto Rico	1:49.27	
8	1	Christian Neunhauserer	Italy	1:49.49	
9	2	Ramil Aritkulov	Russia	1:49.99	Q
10	2	Walid Meliani	Algeria	1:50.07	Q
11	2	Roman Hanzel	Slovakia	1:50.11	Q
12	2	Joel Kidger	Great Britain	1:50.15	
13	2	Daniel Ruiz	Spain	1:50.36	
14	2	Fabio Lettieri	Italy	1:50.84	
15	2	Cho Jae-Deuk	South Korea	1:51.28	
	2	Mikhail Kolganov	Kazakhstan	DNS	

=== Final ===
Rank	Athlete	Nationality	Time	Notes
1st place, gold medalist(s)	Roman Oravec	Czech Republic	1:48.01	
2nd place, silver medalist(s)	Ramil Aritkulov	Russia	1:48.19	
3rd place, bronze medalist(s)	Fabiano Peçanha	Brazil	1:48.20	
4	Ioan Zaizan	Romania	1:48.85	
5	Walid Meliani	Algeria	1:48.95	
6	Artyom Mastrov	Russia	1:49.13	
7	Eugenio Barrios	Spain	1:49.35	
8	Roman Hanzel	Slovakia	1:50.21	
