= Athletics at the 1999 Summer Universiade – Men's 800 metres =

The men's 800 metres event at the 1999 Summer Universiade was held on 8, 9 and 11 July at the Estadio Son Moix in Palma de Mallorca, Spain.

== Medalists ==
Gold	Silver	Bronze
Norberto Téllez; Cuba	André Bucher; Switzerland	Derrick Peterson; United States

== Results ==
=== Heats ===
Rank	Heat	Athlete	Nationality	Time	Notes
1	3	Grant Cremer	Australia	1:48.65	Q
2	1	Jean-Patrick Nduwimana	Burundi	1:48.91	Q
2	6	Trinity Gray	United States	1:48.91	Q
4	3	Djabir Saïd-Guerni	Algeria	1:49.08	Q
4	6	Gideon van Oudtshoorn	South Africa	1:49.08	Q
6	1	Daryl Fillion	Canada	1:49.09	Q
7	6	Eugenio Barrios	Spain	1:49.15	q
8	1	Kim Soon-hyung	South Korea	1:49.22	q
9	2	André Bucher	Switzerland	1:49.24	Q
10	3	Wojciech Kałdowski	Poland	1:49.30	q
11	2	David Divad	France	1:49.45	Q
12	2	Urmet Uusorg	Estonia	1:49.56	q
13	2	Abderrahim Jaafari	Morocco	1:49.67	
14	6	Duarte Ponte	Portugal	1:49.73	
15	5	Derrick Peterson	United States	1:50.19	Q
16	5	Jurgens Kotze	South Africa	1:50.23	Q
17	1	Gezachw Yossef	Israel	1:50.24	
18	5	Joseph Ischia	Australia	1:50.35	
19	3	Márcio de Olivera	Brazil	1:50.51	
20	6	Marcos Flademir Vieira	Brazil	1:51.15	
21	1	Abdelkader Mokrane	Algeria	1:51.59	
22	4	Norberto Téllez	Cuba	1:51.99	Q
23	4	James Karanu	Kenya	1:52.11	Q
24	2	Elliot Phelaphela	Botswana	1:52.27	
24	4	Felix Leiter	Germany	1:52.27	
26	4	Mouhssin Chehibi	Morocco	1:52.46	
27	3	Juan Carlos Esteso	Spain	1:52.63	
28	1	Carl Jackson	New Zealand	1:52.74	
29	2	Damien Shirley	New Zealand	1:53.12	
30	1	Peter Kerema	Kenya	1:53.87	
31	1	Peter Poles	Slovenia	1:54.14	
32	2	Carlos Mejía	Puerto Rico	1:54.87	
33	4	Niclas Nygren-Johansson	Sweden	1:56.15	
34	5	Xandru Grecht	Malta	1:56.33	
35	3	Abednigo Sibandze	Swaziland	1:56.92	
36	3	Luis Abaya	Costa Rica	1:58.71	PB
37	5	Henry Bakumpe	Uganda	1:59.29	
38	4	Jaime Montes	Puerto Rico	1:59.78	
39	6	Gerald Grecht	Malta	2:00.29	
40	5	Yaya Terap Adoum	Chad	2:01.66	
41	5	Paolo Cueva	Peru	2:02.29	
	4	Farid da Graça	São Tomé and Príncipe	DNS	
	6	Lam Ka Lam	Macau	DNS	

=== Semifinals ===
Rank	Heat	Athlete	Nationality	Time	Notes
1	1	Djabir Saïd-Guerni	Algeria	1:46.31	Q
2	1	André Bucher	Switzerland	1:46.32	Q
3	1	David Divad	France	1:46.75	Q, SB
4	1	James Karanu	Kenya	1:47.03	q, PB
5	1	Trinity Gray	United States	1:47.56	q
6	2	Norberto Téllez	Cuba	1:48.02	Q
7	2	Grant Cremer	Australia	1:48.10	Q
8	2	Derrick Peterson	United States	1:48.25	Q
9	2	Kim Soon-hyung	South Korea	1:48.28	
10	2	Jean-Patrick Nduwimana	Burundi	1:48.40	
11	1	Jurgens Kotze	South Africa	1:48.90	
12	2	Eugenio Barrios	Spain	1:49.22	
13	1	Urmet Uusorg	Estonia	1:49.31	
13	2	Daryl Fillion	Canada	1:49.31	
15	2	Gideon van Oudtshoorn	South Africa	1:49.61	
16	1	Wojciech Kałdowski	Poland	1:51.83	

=== Final ===
Rank	Athlete	Nationality	Time	Notes
1st place, gold medalist(s)	Norberto Téllez	Cuba	1:46.11	
2nd place, silver medalist(s)	André Bucher	Switzerland	1:46.49	
3rd place, bronze medalist(s)	Derrick Peterson	United States	1:46.75	
4	Djabir Saïd-Guerni	Algeria	1:46.75	
5	Grant Cremer	Australia	1:46.97	
6	James Karanu	Kenya	1:47.70	
7	David Divad	France	1:47.81	
8	Trinity Gray	United States	1:51.91	
