= Fadrique Iglesias =

Bolivian middle-distance runner

Personal information
- Full name: Fadrique Ignacio Iglesias Mendizábal
- Nationality: Bolivia
- Born: 12 October 1980 (age 45) Cochabamba, Bolivia
- Height: 1.72 m (5 ft 7 1/2 in)
- Weight: 62 kg (137 lb)

Sport
- Sport: Athletics
- Event: Middle distance running

Achievements and titles
- Personal bests: 800 m: 1:48.16 (2006); 1500 m: 3:45.57 (2007)
Medal record
Men's athletics
Representing Bolivia
Ibero-American Championships
Silver medal – second place	2006 Ponce	800 m

Fadrique Ignacio Iglesias Mendizábal (born October 12, 1980 in Cochabamba) is a Bolivian middle distance runner, who specialized in the 800 metres. He set both a national record and a personal best time of 1:48.16 by winning the silver medal for the 800 m at the 2006 Ibero-American Championships in Ponce, Puerto Rico.

== Career ==
Iglesias made his official debut for the 2004 Summer Olympics in Athens, where he competed in the men's 800 m. He finished eighth in the first heat of the event by two thirds of a second (0.66) behind Azerbaijan's Alibay Shukurov, with a time of 1:51.87.

At the 2008 Summer Olympics, Iglesias ran in the sixth heat of the men's 800 m against seven other athletes, including Czech Republic's Jakub Holuša and Morocco's Amine Laalou, both of whom were heavy favorites of this event. He finished the race in seventh place by nearly two seconds behind Canada's Achraf Tadili, with a time of 1:50.57. Iglesias, however, failed to advance into the semi-finals, as he placed fifty-third overall, and was ranked farther below two mandatory slots for the next round.

== Competition record ==
Year	Competition	Venue	Position	Event	Notes
Representing Bolivia
1999	South American Junior Championships	Concepción, Chile	10th	1500 m	1:57.74
2001	South American Championships	Manaus, Brazil	7th	800 m	1:52.19
2001	Bolivarian Games	Ambato, Ecuador	3rd	800 m	1:51.64
2003	South American Championships	Barquisimeto, Venezuela	11th (h)	800 m	1:52.01
2003	South American Championships	Barquisimeto, Venezuela	8th	1500 m	3:53.26
2003	World Indoor Championships	Birmingham, United Kingdom	20th (h)	800 m	1:52.93
2004	Ibero-American Championships	Huelva, Spain	6th (h)	800 m	1:50.20
2004	Ibero-American Championships	Huelva, Spain	9th	1500 m	3:49.24
2004	Olympic Games	Athens, Greece	68th (h)	800 m	1:51.87
2005	South American Championships	Cali, Colombia	4th	800 m	1:48.76
2005	World Championships	Helsinki, Finland	34th (h)	800 m	1:49.57
2005	Bolivarian Games	Armenia, Colombia	3rd	800 m	1:51.41
2006	World Indoor Championships	Moscow, Russia	22nd (h)	800 m	1:50.65
2006	Ibero-American Championships	Ponce, Puerto Rico	2nd	800 m	1:48.16
2006	Ibero-American Championships	Ponce, Puerto Rico	11th	1500 m	3:49.82
2007	South American Championships	São Paulo, Brazil	6th	1500 m	3:45.57
2007	Pan American Games	Rio de Janeiro, Brazil	9th (h)	800 m	1:48.27
2007	World Championships	Osaka, Japan	42nd (h)	800 m	1:48.42
2008	World Indoor Championships	Valencia, Spain	21st (h)	800 m	1:50.55
2008	Ibero-American Championships	Iquique, Chile	9th (h)	800 m	1:51.70
2008	Olympic Games	Beijing, China	53rd (h)	800 m	1:50.57
