= Athletics at the 2009 Summer Universiade – Men's 800 metres =

The men's 800 metres event at the 2009 Summer Universiade was held on 10–12 July.

== Medalists ==
Gold	Silver	Bronze
Sajjad Moradi; Iran	Goran Nava; Serbia	Fabiano Peçanha; Brazil

== Results ==
=== Heats ===
Qualification: First 3 of each heat (Q) and the next 6 fastest (q) qualified for the semifinals.

Rank	Heat	Name	Nationality	Time	Notes
1	1	Dávid Takács	Hungary	1:49.64	Q
2	1	Lachlan Renshaw	Australia	1:50.03	Q
3	6	Predrag Ranđelović	Serbia	1:50.03	Q, PB
4	5	Oleksandr Osmolovych	Ukraine	1:50.29	Q
5	6	Li Xiangyu	China	1:50.30	Q
6	6	Alexey Konovalov	Russia	1:50.35	Q
7	5	Cristian Vorovenci	Romania	1:50.51	Q
8	5	Goran Nava	Serbia	1:50.61	Q
9	1	Sajjad Moradi	Iran	1:50.65	Q
10	5	Jozef Pelikan	Slovakia	1:50.74	q
11	4	Fabiano Peçanha	Brazil	1:51.09	Q
12	4	Masato Yokota	Japan	1:51.15	Q
13	4	Salvador Crespo	Spain	1:51.16	Q
14	4	Vitalij Kozlov	Lithuania	1:51.19	q
15	6	Roman Fosti	Estonia	1:51.35	q
16	4	Reda Ait Douida	Morocco	1:51.36	q
17	4	Yudah Chesire	Uganda	1:51.58	q
18	1	Johan Bagge	Sweden	1:51.62	q
19	5	Eoin Everard	Ireland	1:51.74	
19	3	Walid Meliani	Algeria	1:51.74	Q
21	1	Kaarel Lilleoja	Estonia	1:52.04	
22	4	Efthymios Papadopoulos	Greece	1:52.11	
23	4	Jost Kozan	Slovenia	1:52.34	
24	2	Ahmed Mainy	Morocco	1:52.41	Q
25	5	Alelksander Krivchonkov	Russia	1:52.45	
26	3	David Horvat	Slovenia	1:52.47	Q
26	3	Ehsan Mohajer Shojaei	Iran	1:52.47	Q
28	6	Johan Klinteskog	Sweden	1:52.49	
29	3	Kristof Shaanika	Namibia	1:52.50	Q
30	3	Darko Rosić	Bosnia and Herzegovina	1:52.59	
31	2	Dušan Babić	Bosnia and Herzegovina	1:52.61	Q
31	2	Jozef Repcik	Slovakia	1:52.61	
33	2	Dániel Kállay	Hungary	1:52.77	
34	3	Katlego Maotwe	Botswana	1:54.61	
35	5	Matias Bredahl Reedtz	Denmark	1:55.11	
36	1	Kim Jaeyoul	South Korea	1:58.01	
37	3	Carlos Noé Alvarez	Guatemala	1:58.76	
38	6	Stefan Bečanović	Montenegro	1:58.91	
39	6	Jaber Al-Shabibi	Oman	2:05.31	
40	6	Tariq Al-Maashani	Oman	2:06.79	
41	2	Shifaz Mohamed	Maldives	2:11.22	
	3	Warren Hendricks	South Africa	DQ	
	1	Sulaiman Ahmed Al-Diwani	Saudi Arabia	DNF	
	2	Ibrahimm Al-Mazyad	Saudi Arabia	DNF	
	1	Hélio Fumo	Portugal	DNS	
	2	Hélio Gomes	Portugal	DNS	
	3	Halidi Djamchi Attoumane	Comoros	DNS	
	6	Abdelmunim Tibin	Sudan	DNS	

=== Semifinals ===
Qualification: First 2 of each semifinal (Q) and the next 2 fastest (q) qualified for the finals.

Rank	Heat	Name	Nationality	Time	Notes
1	2	Vitalij Kozlov	Lithuania	1:49.06	Q
2	1	Sajjad Moradi	Iran	1:49.07	Q
3	1	Walid Meliani	Algeria	1:49.11	Q
4	2	Fabiano Peçanha	Brazil	1:49.18	Q
5	1	Lachlan Renshaw	Australia	1:49.27	q
6	2	Goran Nava	Serbia	1:49.34	q
7	2	Salvador Crespo	Spain	1:49.49	
8	2	Li Xiangyu	China	1:49.58	
9	2	Dávid Takács	Hungary	1:49.70	
10	3	Oleksandr Osmolovych	Ukraine	1:49.85	Q
11	2	Reda Ait Douida	Morocco	1:49.94	
12	3	Masato Yokota	Japan	1:50.07	Q
13	1	Cristian Vorovenci	Romania	1:50.38	
14	3	Jozef Pelikan	Slovakia	1:50.42	
15	1	Ahmed Mainy	Morocco	1:50.50	
16	2	Kristof Shaanika	Namibia	1:50.62	
17	1	Dušan Babić	Bosnia and Herzegovina	1:50.65	
18	3	Yudah Chesire	Uganda	1:51.25	
19	2	Johan Bagge	Sweden	1:51.64	
20	3	Alexey Konovalov	Russia	1:51.82	
21	1	Predrag Ranđelović	Serbia	1:51.91	
22	3	Roman Fosti	Estonia	1:53.58	
23	3	David Horvat	Slovenia	1:54.70	
	3	Ehsan Mohajer Shojaei	Iran	DNF	

=== Final ===
Rank	Name	Nationality	Time	Notes
1st place, gold medalist(s)	Sajjad Moradi	Iran	1:48.02	
2nd place, silver medalist(s)	Goran Nava	Serbia	1:48.06	
3rd place, bronze medalist(s)	Fabiano Peçanha	Brazil	1:48.07	
4	Masato Yokota	Japan	1:48.08	
5	Lachlan Renshaw	Australia	1:48.27	
6	Walid Meliani	Algeria	1:48.64	
7	Oleksandr Osmolovych	Ukraine	1:48.85	
8	Vitalij Kozlov	Lithuania	1:49.43	
