= 2000 European Athletics Indoor Championships – Men's 800 metres =

The men's 800 metres event at the 2000 European Athletics Indoor Championships was held on February 25–27.

== Medalists ==
Gold	Silver	Bronze
Yuriy Borzakovskiy; Russia	Nils Schumann; Germany	Balázs Korányi; Hungary

== Results ==
=== Heats ===
First 2 of each heat (Q) and the next 4 fastest (q) qualified for the semifinals.

Rank	Heat	Name	Nationality	Time	Notes
1	3	Yuriy Borzakovskiy	Russia	1:48.57	Q
2	3	Wilson Kirwa	Finland	1:48.88	Q
3	3	Tom Omey	Belgium	1:49.77	q
4	4	Wojciech Kałdowski	Poland	1:50.03	Q
5	3	Marco Chiavarini	Italy	1:50.15	q
6	4	Roberto Parra	Spain	1:50.32	Q
7	3	Carlos Calvo	Luxembourg	1:50.59	q
8	4	Ben Quintelier	Belgium	1:50.76	q, PB
9	4	Jimmy Jean-Joseph	France	1:50.80	
10	1	Roman Oravec	Czech Republic	1:50.88	Q
11	4	Oliver Daum	Germany	1:50.90	
12	1	Balázs Korányi	Hungary	1:50.91	Q
13	1	Grzegorz Krzosek	Poland	1:51.07	
14	4	Vane Stoyanov	Macedonia	1:51.34	
15	1	Dmitriy Bogdanov	Russia	1:51.67	
16	1	Birger Ohlsson	Sweden	1:51.99	
17	1	Constantinos Hadjlmarcov	Cyprus	1:52.03	
18	2	Nils Schumann	Germany	1:53.78	Q
19	2	Eugenio Barrios	Spain	1:53.84	Q
20	2	Sergey Kozhevnikov	Russia	1:53.86	
21	2	David Divad	France	1:54.09	
22	2	Joeri Jansen	Belgium	1:54.18	

=== Semifinals ===
First 3 of each semifinals qualified directly (Q) for the final.

Rank	Heat	Name	Nationality	Time	Notes
1	1	Nils Schumann	Germany	1:50.11	Q
2	1	Wilson Kirwa	Finland	1:50.24	Q
3	1	Balázs Korányi	Hungary	1:50.29	Q
4	1	Roman Oravec	Czech Republic	1:50.33	
5	1	Tom Omey	Belgium	1:51.46	
5	2	Yuriy Borzakovskiy	Russia	1:51.46	Q
7	2	Roberto Parra	Spain	1:51.79	Q
8	2	Marco Chiavarini	Italy	1:52.03	Q
9	2	Carlos Calvo	Luxembourg	1:53.15	
10	1	Eugenio Barrios	Spain	1:53.21	
11	2	Ben Quintelier	Belgium	1:55.76	
	2	Wojciech Kałdowski	Poland	DNS	

=== Final ===
Rank	Name	Nationality	Time	Notes
1st place, gold medalist(s)	Yuriy Borzakovskiy	Russia	1:47.92	
2nd place, silver medalist(s)	Nils Schumann	Germany	1:48.41	
3rd place, bronze medalist(s)	Balázs Korányi	Hungary	1:48.42	
4	Wilson Kirwa	Finland	1:48.69	
5	Roberto Parra	Spain	1:49.80	
6	Marco Chiavarini	Italy	1:51.27	
