= William Yiampoy =

Kenyan middle-distance runner (born 1974)

Medal record

Men's athletics

Representing Kenya

African Championships
Gold medal – first place	2004 Brazzaville	800 m
Silver medal – second place	2002 Radès	800 m

William Oloonkishu Yiampoy (born 17 May 1974, in Emarti) is a Kenyan runner who specializes in the 800 metres. His personal best is 1:42.91 minutes, achieved in September 2002 in Rieti.

He graduated from Sosio High School in Kilgoris in 1989. He was recruited by Kenya Police in 1991. He did not start running until 1996. In 1999, he ran his first European races. He was selected to compete at the 2000 Olympics replacing Patrick Konchellah, the winner of Kenyan Olympic trials.

He was part of the 4 x 800 metres relay team who currently holds the world record.

He is married with two children. He is managed by Gianni Demadonna and coached by Gianni Ghidini. Yiampoy is a member of the Maasai tribe.

== Achievements ==
Year	Competition	Venue	Position	Event	Notes
Representing Kenya
2001	World Championships	Edmonton, Canada	4th	800 m	
2001	Goodwill Games	Brisbane, Australia	1st	800 m	
2002	African Championships	Radès, Tunisia	2nd	800 m	
2004	World Indoor Championships	Budapest, Hungary	5th	800 m	
2004	African Championships	Brazzaville, Congo	1st	800 m	
2005	World Championships	Helsinki, Finland	3rd	800 m	
2005	World Athletics Final	Monte Carlo, Monaco	4th	800 m	
