= Berhanu Alemu =

Ethiopian middle-distance runner

Berhanu Alemu Feysa (Amharic: ብርሃኑ አለሙ; born 16 July 1982) is an Ethiopian former middle-distance runner specializing in the 800 metres. He competed at the 2000 and 2004 Summer Olympics failing to advance to the final.

His 800 metres personal best of 1:45.28 from 2004 is a former Ethiopian record, broken in 2011 by Mohammed Aman.

== Competition record ==
Year	Competition	Venue	Position	Event	Notes
Representing Ethiopia
1999	World Youth Championships	Bydgoszcz, Poland	2nd	800 m	1:50.79
1999	All-Africa Games	Johannesburg, South Africa	9th (sf)	800 m	1:48.35
2000	Olympic Games	Sydney, Australia	18th (sf)	1500 m	3:41:09
2000	World Junior Championships	Santiago, Chile	25th (h)	1500 m	3:55.74
2002	African Championships	Radès, Tunisia	6th	800 m	1:48.54
2002	African Championships	Radès, Tunisia	8th	1500 m	3:44.23
2003	World Championships	Paris, France	8th (sf)	800 m	1:46.40
2004	World Indoor Championships	Budapest, Hungary	–	800 m	DQ
2004	Olympic Games	Athens, Greece	19th (sf)	800 m	1:47.40
2005	World Championships	Helsinki, Finland	20th (sf)	800 m	1:47.66
2006	World Indoor Championships	Moscow, Russia	23rd (h)	800 m	1:51.07
2006	African Championships	Bambous, Mauritius	8th	800 m	1:52.25

== Personal bests ==
- 800 metres – 1:45.28 (Bergen 2004)
- 1500 metres – 3:35.67 (Heusden-Zolder 2000)
- One mile – 3:58.95 (Oslo 2002)

Indoor

- 800 metres – 1:45.85 (Fayetteville 2004)
- 1000 metres – 2:19.39 (Erfurt 2001)
- 1500 metres – 3:38.75 (Birmingham 2001)
- One mile – 3:57.76 (New York 2007)
