= Wojciech Kałdowski =

Polish middle-distance runner

Personal information
- Nationality: Polish
- Born: 16 April 1976 (age 50) Miastko, Poland

Sport
- Sport: Track and field
- Event: 800 metres
Medal record
Representing Poland
Men's athletics
European Indoor Championships
Bronze medal – third place	1996 Stockholm	800 m

Wojciech Kałdowski (born 16 April 1976) is a retired Polish middle-distance runner who specialized in the 800 metres.

He won the bronze medals at the 1995 European Junior Championships and the 1996 European Indoor Championships and finished sixth at the 1998 European Championships.

His personal best time is 1:45.56 minutes, achieved in August 1999 in Sopot.

== Competition record ==
Year	Competition	Venue	Position	Event	Notes
Representing Poland
1995	European Junior Championships	Nyíregyháza, Hungary	3rd	800 m	1:47.67
1996	European Indoor Championships	Stockholm, Sweden	3rd	800 m	1:48.40
1997	European U23 Championships	Turku, Finland	8th	800 m	1:49.48
1998	European Championships	Budapest, Hungary	6th	800 m	1:46.60
1999	World Indoor Championships	Maebashi, Japan	7th (sf)	800 m	1:47.58
1999	Universiade	Palma de Mallorca, Spain	16th (sf)	800 m	1:51.83
1999	World Championships	Seville, Spain	10th (sf)	800 m	1:46.49
2000	European Indoor Championships	Ghent, Belgium	4th (h)	800 m	1:50.03
