= Balázs Korányi =

Hungarian middle-distance runner

Personal information
- Born: 30 May 1974 (age 52) Budapest, Hungary

Sport
- Sport: Track and field
Medal record
Representing Hungary
European Indoor Championships
Bronze medal – third place	2000 Ghent	800m

Balázs Korányi (born 30 May 1974) is a retired Hungarian middle-distance runner who specialised in the 800 metres. He finished fourth at the 1999 World Indoor Championships.

Korányi was an All-American for the Rutgers Scarlet Knights track and field team in the United States, finishing 3rd in the 800 m at the 1995 outdoor and 1997 NCAA Division I Indoor Track and Field Championships.

== Competition record ==
Year	Competition	Venue	Position	Event	Notes
Representing Hungary
1995	Universiade	Fukuoka, Japan	15th (sf)	800 m	1:52.45
1995	Universiade	Fukuoka, Japan	11th (h)	4 × 400 m relay	3:09.59
1996	Olympic Games	Atlanta, United States	21st (sf)	800 m	1:50.30
1998	European Championships	Budapest, Hungary	5th	800 m	1:45.78
1999	World Indoor Championships	Maebashi, Japan	4th	800 m	1:46.47
1999	World Championships	Seville, Spain	32nd (h)	800 m	1:47.60
1999	World Championships	Seville, Spain	–	4 × 400 m relay	DNF
2000	European Indoor Championships	Ghent, Belgium	3rd	800 m	1:48.42
2000	Olympic Games	Sydney, Australia	19th (sf)	800 m	1:47.35

== Personal bests ==
Outdoor

- 600 metres – 1:16.33 (Florø 1999) NR
- 800 metres – 1:45.39 (Roma 1999)

Indoor

- 600 metres – 1:16.59 (Stange 1999) NR
- 800 metres – 1:46.47 (Maebashi 1999) NR
