= Alibay Shukurov =

Azerbaijani middle-distance runner

Personal information
- Full name: Alibay Shukurov
- Nationality: Azerbaijan
- Born: 2 May 1977 (age 49) [Baku],, Soviet Union
- Height: 1.78 m (5 ft 10 in)
- Weight: 70 kg (154 lb)

Sport
- Sport: Athletics
- Event: Middle-distance running

Achievements and titles
- Personal bests: 800 m: 1:46.64 (2004); 1500 m: 3:45.81 (2004)

Alibay Shukurov (Azerbaijani: Əlibəy Şükürov; born 2 May 1977 in Baku, Azerbaijan, is a retired Azerbaijani middle-distance runner, who specialised in both the 800 metres and the 1500 metres. He was selected to compete for the Azerbaijan Olympic squad in the 800 metres at the 2004 Summer Olympics, after posting his own personal best in 1:46.64 from the national athletics meet in Baku.

Shukurov qualified for the Azerbaijani squad in the men's 800 metres at the 2004 Summer Olympics in Athens, by attaining a personal record and an Olympic B-standard entry time of 1:46.64 from the national athletics meet in Baku. He surpassed Bolivia's Fadrique Iglesias to cross the finish line in heat one of the prelims by seventy-six hundredths of a second (0.76), failing to advance further into the semifinals with a seventh-place time in 1:51.11.

Shukurov currently resides in Istanbul, Turkey, where he works as an international relations officer for Fenerbahçe Sports Club (Turkish: Fenerbahçe Spor Kulübü).
