= Yusuf Saad Kamel =

Bahraini middle-distance runner

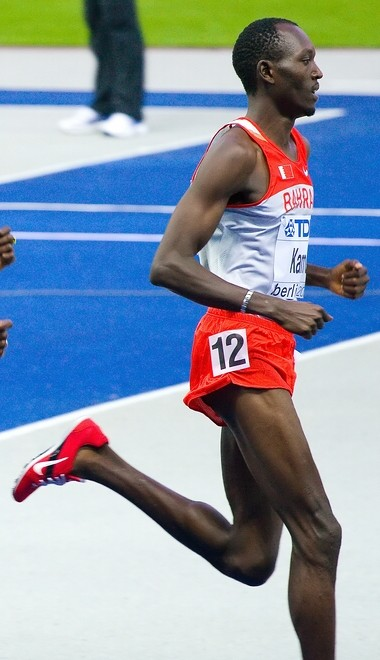
- Kamel at the 2009 World Championships in Berlin

Personal information
- Born: Gregory Konchellah; March 29, 1983 (age 43) Narok, Kenya

Sport
- Country: Bahrain
- Sport: Men's athletics
- Events: 800 metres, 1500 metres
- Retired: 2016

Achievements and titles
- Personal bests: 800 m: 1:42.79 min (2008); 1500 m: 3:31.56 min (2009)
Medal record
Men's athletics
Representing Bahrain
World Championships
Gold medal – first place	2009 Berlin	1500 m
Bronze medal – third place	2009 Berlin	800 m
World Indoor Championships
Bronze medal – third place	2008 Valencia	800 m
Asian Indoor Championships
Gold medal – first place	2008 Doha	800 m
Bronze medal – third place	2004 Tehran	800 m

Yusuf Saad Kamel (Arabic: يوسف سعد كامل), born Gregory Konchellah (born March 29, 1983) is a male former middle-distance runner who competed in the 800 metres and 1500 metres. Born in Narok, Kenya – the son of former two-time 800 metres World Champion Billy Konchellah – he represented Bahrain internationally. Kamel won the gold in the 1500 m and bronze in 800 m at the 2009 World Championships in Athletics held in Berlin.

In early 2009 he stopped competing for Bahrain claiming unpaid salary and bonuses. He was willing to compete for Kenya, but his Kenyan passport was held by Bahraini officials. Without a passport, he was unable to compete in any competition. Several other Kenyan runners who took Bahraini citizenship have also left Bahrain and are vying to compete for Kenya. However, he returned to the track in July 2009 at the Athletissima meeting, still representing Bahrain. Subsequently, Athletics Kenya stopped to handle his attempt to compete for Kenya.

At the 2011 World Championships in Athletics in Daegu he only participated at the 1500 m but just failed to qualify for the final.

He trained with PACE Sports Management under Ricky Simms.

== Statistics ==
=== Competition record ===
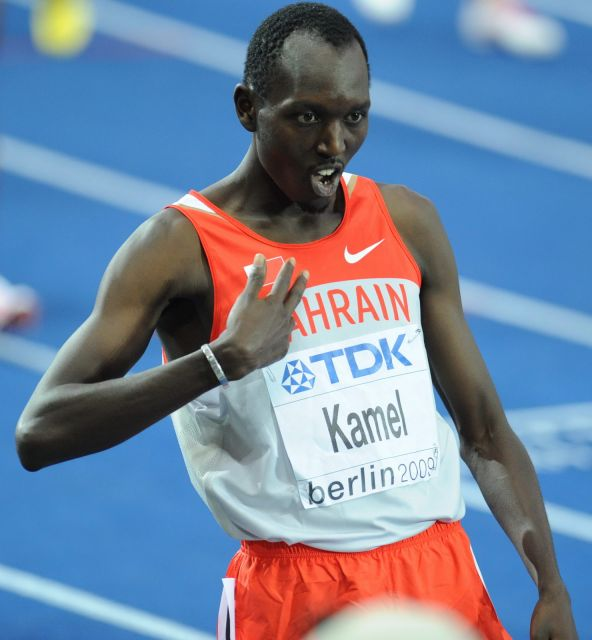
Kamel after taking the 1500 m gold at the 2009 World Championships

Year	Competition	Venue	Position	Event	Notes
2004	Asian Indoor Championships	Tehran, Iran	3rd	800 m	1:48.89
2004	World Indoor Championships	Budapest, Hungary	3rd (semis)	800 m	1:47.16
2004	Olympic Games	Athens, Greece	3rd (heats)	800 m	1:46.94
2004	World Athletics Final	Monte Carlo, Monaco	1st	800 m	1:45.91
2004	Pan Arab Games	Algiers, Algeria	1st	800 m	1:46.12
2005	Arab Championships	Tunis, Tunisia	1st	800 m	1:47.36
2005	World Championships	Helsinki, Finland	3rd	800 m	1:44.90
2005	World Athletics Final	Monte Carlo, Monaco	2nd	800 m	1:47.13
2006	World Athletics Final	Stuttgart, Germany	6th	800 m	1:47.62
2006	World Cup	Athens, Greece	1st	800 m	1:44.98
2006	Asian Games	Doha, Qatar	1st	800 m	1:45.74
2007	World Championships	Osaka, Japan	9th (semis)	800 m	1:45.31
2007	World Athletics Final	Stuttgart, Germany	1st	800 m	1:45.61 CR
2008	Asian Indoor Championships	Doha, Qatar	1st	800 m	1:48.03 CR
2008	World Indoor Championships	Valencia, Spain	3rd	800 m	1:45.26
2008	Olympic Games	Beijing, China	5th	800 m	1:44.95
2008	World Athletics Final	Stuttgart, Germany	3rd	800 m	1:49.40
2008	World Athletics Final	Stuttgart, Germany	5th	1500 m	3:38.50
2009	World Championships	Berlin, Germany	3rd	800 m	1:45.35
2009	World Championships	Berlin, Germany	1st	1500 m	3:35.93
2009	World Athletics Final	Thessaloniki, Greece	4th	1500 m	3:36.11
2010	West Asian Championships	Aleppo, Syria	3rd	1500 m	3:40.58
2010	Asian Games	Guangzhou, China	9th (heats)	1500 m	3:58.80
2011	Military World Games	Rio de Janeiro, Brazil	5th	800 m	1:46.89
2011	World Championships	Daegu, South Korea	6th (semis)	1500 m	3:47.18
2013	Asian Championships	Pune, India	6th	800 m	1:50.54
2013	Islamic Solidarity Games	Palembang, Indonesia	4th	1500 m	1:48.27
2014	Asian Games	Incheon, South Korea	—	800 m	DNF

=== Circuit wins ===
800 metres

- Memorial Van Damme: 2008.
- ISTAF Berlin: 2004.

== See also ==
- List of middle-distance runners
- List of eligibility transfers in athletics
- List of World Athletics Championships medalists (men)
- List of sportspeople who competed for more than one nation
- List of Asian Games medalists in athletics
- List of IAAF World Indoor Championships medalists (men)
- 800 metres at the World Championships in Athletics
- 1500 metres at the World Championships in Athletics
