= Abubaker Kaki Khamis =

Sudanese runner (born 1989)

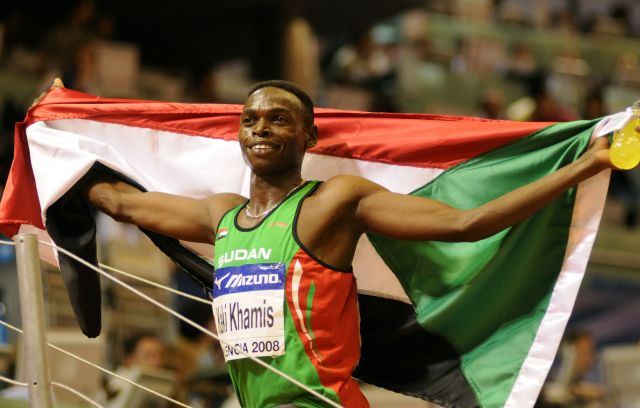
- Kaki Khamis at the 2008 IAAF World Indoor Championships

Personal information
- Nationality: Sudanese
- Born: 21 June 1989 (age 37) Muglad, West Kordofan, Sudan
- Height: 1.76 m (5 ft 9 1/2 in)
- Weight: 63 kg (139 lb)

Sport
- Sport: Track and field
- Events: 800 metres, 1000 metres
- Coached by: Jama Aden

Achievements and titles
- Personal bests: 800 metres: 1:42.23; 1500 metres: 3:31.76
Medal record
Men's athletics
Representing Sudan
World Championships
Silver medal – second place	2011 Daegu	800 m
World Indoor Championships
Gold medal – first place	2008 Valencia	800 m
Gold medal – first place	2010 Doha	800 m
African Championships
Silver medal – second place	2008 Addis Ababa	4×400 m
World Youth Championships
Bronze medal – third place	2005 Marrakesh	1500 m

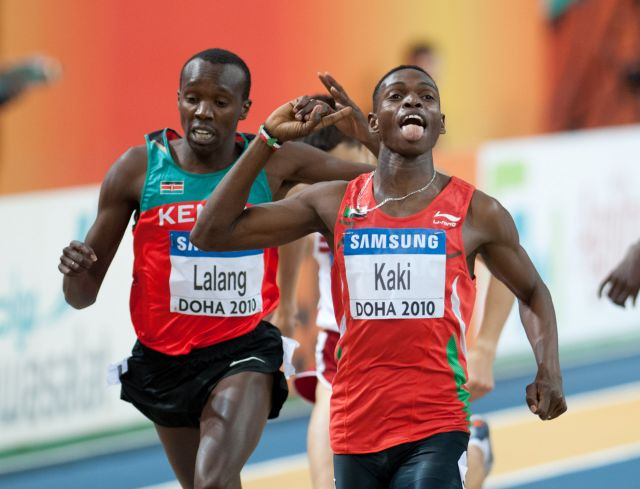
Kaki celebrating his win at the 2010 World Indoor Championships

Abubaker Kaki Khamis (Arabic: أبو بكر خميس كاكي; born 21 June 1989) is a Sudanese runner who specialises in the 800 metres. He is a two-time World Indoor Champion over the distance and also won gold at the 2007 All-Africa Games. He represented Sudan at the 2008 and 2012 Summer Olympics. He is a member of the Messiria ethnic minority.

== Running career ==
In February 2008 he ran a world-leading 2:15.7 in the 1000 m indoors in Sweden. On 9 March 2008, in Valencia, Kaki became the youngest ever World Indoor champion after winning the 800 m final at age 18 years and 262 days. On 6 June 2008, he won the Bislett Games Golden League meeting in Oslo by running 1:42.69, a new world junior record. The previous record (1:43.64) was set by Japheth Kimutai of Kenya in 1997. The following month he entered the 2008 World Junior Championships in Athletics as the 800 m favorite. He was closely followed by Keny's Geoffrey Kibet in the final but managed to pull clear on the final straight to win the gold medal.

Kaki finished 8th in the third semi-final for the 800 m and did not advance to the final at the 2008 Summer Olympics in Beijing. In the 2009 World Championships in Berlin, where he was a strong favorite, Kaki tripped and fell in the semi-final, and did not complete the race.

Kaki retained his title at the 2010 IAAF World Indoor Championships at the age of twenty, becoming only the second athlete after Paul Ereng to complete the feat in the men's 800 m. In the outdoor season, he made his first appearance in the 2010 IAAF Diamond League in an 800 m match-up against David Rudisha. Both runners defeated Sebastian Coe's 31-year-old meeting record, but Kaki was not fast enough to beat Rudisha. Kaki's time of 1:42.23 was a new Sudanese record and, at the time, the fastest 800 m time ever recorded for a non-winning athlete. He won at the Memorial Primo Nebiolo later that month in another quick time of 1:43.48. Since then he made the 800 m final at the London 2012 Olympic Games where he finished 7th in 1.43.32, a season's best performance.

== Reported death ==
Kaki was reported killed on 12 April 2025 in El Fasher, as a result of artillery shelling by the Rapid Support Forces, during the Siege of El Fasher in the Sudanese civil war. However, this report was refuted by African journalists, who claimed that Kaki was still alive.

== Achievements ==
Year	Competition	Venue	Position	Event	Notes
Representing Sudan
2005	World Youth Championships	Marrakesh, Morocco	3rd	1500 m	3:45.06
2005	African Junior Championships	Radès, Tunisia	7th	800 m	1:50.30
2006	World Junior Championships	Beijing, China	6th	800 m	1:48.46
2007	All-Africa Games	Algiers, Algeria	1st	800 m	1:45.22
2007	All-Africa Games	Algiers, Algeria	7th	4 × 400 m relay	3:09.37
2007	World Championships	Osaka, Japan	30th (h)	800 m	1:46.38
2007	Pan Arab Games	Cairo, Egypt	1st	800 m	1:43.90 (NR)
2007	Pan Arab Games	Cairo, Egypt	1st	1500 m	3:47.92
2007	Pan Arab Games	Cairo, Egypt	2nd	4 × 400 m relay	3:06.52 (NR)
2008	World Indoor Championships	Valencia, Spain	1st	800 m	1:44.81
2008	African Championships	Addis Ababa, Ethiopia	2nd	4 × 400 m relay	3:04.00
2008	World Junior Championships	Bydgoszcz, Poland	1st	800 m	1:45.60
2008	Summer Olympics	Beijing, China	24th (sf)	800 m	1:49.19
2009	World Championships	Berlin, Germany	22nd (sf)	800 m	DNF
2010	World Indoor Championships	Doha, Qatar	1st	800 m	1:46.23
2010	African Championships	Nairobi, Kenya	4th	4 × 400 m relay	3:08.52
2011	World Championships	Daegu, South Korea	2nd	800 m	1:44.41
2012	Summer Olympics	London, United Kingdom	7th	800 m	1:43.32

== Personal bests ==
Outdoor
Event	Time	Date	Location
800 metres	1:42.23 † ‡	4 June 2010	Oslo
1000 metres	2:13.62	3 July 2010	Eugene
1500 metres	3:31.76 †	22 July 2011	Monaco

Indoor
Event	Time	Date	Location
800 metres	1:44.81	9 Mar 2008	Valencia
1000 metres	2:15.77	21 Feb 2008	Stockholm

All Information taken from IAAF profile.

Key: † = National record

Olympic Games
Preceded by Todd Matthews Jouda	Flagbearer for Sudan; Beijing 2008	Succeeded by Ismail Ahmed Ismail
Records
Preceded by Japheth Kimutai	Men's World Junior Record Holder, 800 metres 6 June 2008 – 9 August 2012	Succeeded by Nijel Amos
