= David Freeman (athlete) =

Puerto Rican middle-distance runner

Personal information
- Nationality: Puerto Rico
- Born: 28 April 1982 (age 44) Miami, Florida
- Height: 1.65 m (5 ft 5 in)
- Weight: 59 kg (130 lb)

Sport
- Sport: Athletics
- Event: Middle distance running

Achievements and titles
- Personal bests: 800 m: 1:46.94 (2007); 1500 m: 3:38.90 (2007)

David Freeman (born 28 April 1982) is a Puerto Rican middle distance runner. He was born in Miami, Florida USA and attended Hialeah High School in Hialeah, Florida. David started running Track & Field as a sophomore in high school. David was third in state championship in 800 meters as sophomore, second during his junior year and he won the state championship in the 800 meters during his senior year of high school (2000).

While considered one of the top middle distance Track & Field runners in the state of Florida, David left Florida and earned an athletic scholarship to the University of Kentucky for Track & Field in 2000. While at the University of Kentucky, David was a 3-time NCAA All American in Track & Field. He also won a Southeastern Conference Championship in the mile race. Regarded as one of the top middle distance runners in the nation during is time at University of Kentucky (2000–04), David continued his Track & Field career after college.

He competed for his mother’s birth country of Puerto Rico. David set both a Puerto Rico national record and a personal best time of 3:38.90 by winning the silver medal for the 1500 metres at the 2007 Ponce Grand Prix in Ponce, Puerto Rico.

David is also a member of the exclusive sub 4:00 mile club which only consist of athletes that have run a mile under 4 minutes. There are only currently 1800 athletes in the world that has ever achieved that milestone.

Freeman represented his nation Puerto Rico at the 2008 Summer Olympics in Beijing, where he competed for the men's 1500 metres. He ran in the third heat, which included Morocco's Abdalaati Iguider, who was considered a top medal contender in this event. He finished the race behind Estonia's Tiidrek Nurme, with a seasonal best time of 3:39.70. Freeman, however, failed to advance into the finals, as he placed twenty-fifth overall.

== Competition record ==
| Year | Competition | Venue | Position | Event | Notes |
Representing Puerto Rico
| 2005 | Central American and Caribbean Championships | Nassau, Bahamas | 2nd | 1500 m | 3:48.01 |
| 2006 | World Indoor Championships | Moscow, Russia | 14th (h) | 1500 m | 3:45.36 |
| 2006 | Ibero-American Championships | Ponce, Puerto Rico | – | 1500 m | DNF |
| 2006 | Ibero-American Championships | Ponce, Puerto Rico | – | 3000 m | DNF |
| 2006 | Central American and Caribbean Games | Cartagena, Colombia | 2nd | 1500 m | 3:43.84 |
| 2007 | NACAC Championships | San Salvador, El Salvador | 5th (h) | 800 m | 1:50.73 |
| 2007 | NACAC Championships | San Salvador, El Salvador | 8th | 1500 m | 1:50.73 |
| 2007 | Pan American Games | Rio de Janeiro, Brazil | 8th | 800 m | 1:47.31 |
| 2007 | Pan American Games | Rio de Janeiro, Brazil | 12th | 1500 m | 3:55.84 |
| 2008 | World Indoor Championships | Valencia, Spain | 25th (h) | 1500 m | 3:51.35 |
| 2008 | Central American and Caribbean Championships | Cali, Colombia | 6th | 800 m | 1:49.32 |
| 2008 | Olympic Games | Beijing, China | 24th (h) | 1500 m | 3:39.70 |
| 2009 | Central American and Caribbean Championships | Havana, Cuba | – | 1500 m | DNF |

== Coaching ==
Freeman coached at
University of Florida (2005 - 2008)
University of Kentucky (2008 - 2009)
Tates Creek High School Lexington, KY (2008 - 2010)
Freedom High School Orlando, Florida (2010 - 2011)
Texas Christian University (2011 - 2013)
University of Southern California (2013–2017)

La Jolla Country Day School (2018-2021)
