= Dávid Takács =

Hungarian middle-distance runner

Personal information
- Born: 15 February 1986 (age 40)

Sport
- Sport: Athletics
- Event: 800 metres

Dávid Takács (born 15 February 1986) is a Hungarian middle-distance runner specialising in the 800 metres. He represented his country at two consecutive World Indoor Championships. In addition, he finished sixth in the final at the 2007 European Indoor Championships in Birmingham.

== International competitions ==
Year	Competition	Venue	Position	Event	Notes
Representing Hungary
2003	World Youth Championships	Sherbrooke, Canada	9th (sf)	800 m	1:53.63
2003	European Youth Olympic Festival	Paris, France	2nd	800 m	1:50.96
2004	World Junior Championships	Grosseto, Italy	14th (h)	800 m	1:50.98
2005	European Junior Championships	Kaunas, Lithuania	4th	800 m	1:51.00
2006	World Indoor Championships	Moscow, Russia	20th (h)	800 m	1:49.61
2007	European Indoor Championships	Birmingham, United Kingdom	6th	800 m	1:49.28
2007	European U23 Championships	Debrecen, Hungary	14th (h)	800 m	1:50.26
2007	European U23 Championships	Debrecen, Hungary	6th	4 × 400 m relay	3:07.08
2007	Universiade	Bangkok, Thailand	28th (h)	800 m	1:50.25
2008	World Indoor Championships	Valencia, Spain	20th (h)	800 m	1:49.79
2009	European Indoor Championships	Turin, Italy	17th (h)	800 m	1:54.45
2009	Universiade	Belgrade, Serbia	9th (sf)	800 m	1:49.70

== Personal bests ==
Outdoor

- 400 metres – 47.11 (Budapest 2009)
- 800 metres – 1:47.56 (Budapest 2009)
- 1500 metres – 3:46.31 (Veszprém 2007)

Indoor

- 400 metres – 47.41 (Budapest 2006)
- 800 metres – 1:48.12 (Vienna 2006)
- 1000 metres – 2:20.79 (Karlsruhe 2007)
- 1500 metres – 3:54.14 (Budapest 2004)
