= Eugenio Barrios =

Spanish middle-distance runner

Personal information
- Born: 3 November 1976 (age 49) Quintanar de la Orden, Spain

Sport
- Sport: Track and field
Medal record
Representing Spain
Mediterranean Games
Gold medal – first place	2005 Almeria	4x400m relay
Silver medal – second place	2005 Almeria	800m

Eugenio Barrios García-Miguel (born 3 November 1976) is a retired Spanish middle distance runner specialising in the 800 metres. He competed at two outdoor and two indoor World Championships.

== Competition record ==
Year	Competition	Venue	Position	Event	Notes
Representing Spain
1999	Universiade	Palma de Mallorca, Spain	12th (sf)	800 m	1:49.22
2000	European Indoor Championships	Ghent, Belgium	10th (sf)	800 m	1:53.21
2003	Universiade	Daegu, South Korea	7th	800 m	1:49.35
2005	European Indoor Championships	Madrid, Spain	8th (h)	800 m	1:48.80
2005	Mediterranean Games	Almería, Spain	2nd	800 m	1:47.36
2005	Mediterranean Games	Almería, Spain	1st	4x400 m relay	3:03.65
2005	World Championships	Helsinki, Finland	23rd (sf)	800 m	1:48.76
2006	World Indoor Championships	Moscow, Russia	12th (sf)	800 m	1:52.75
2007	World Championships	Osaka, Japan	34th (h)	800 m	1:46.62
2008	World Indoor Championships	Valencia, Spain	14th (sf)	800 m	1:49.02

== Personal bests ==
Outdoor

- 800 metres – 1:44.84 (Rieti 2006)
- 1000 metres – 2:17.88 (Andújar 2006)
- 1500 metres – 3:36.81 (Berlin 2006)

Indoor

- 800 metres – 1:47.21 (Stockholm 2007)
- 1500 metres – 3:40.62 (Seville 2010)
