= Djabir Saïd-Guerni =

Algerian middle-distance runner

Personal information
- Born: 29 March 1977 (age 49) Algiers, Algeria
Medal record
Men's athletics
Representing Algeria
Olympic Games
Bronze medal – third place	2000 Sydney	800 m
World Championships
Gold medal – first place	2003 Paris	800 m
Bronze medal – third place	1999 Seville	800 m
African Championships
Gold medal – first place	2000 Algiers	800 m
Gold medal – first place	2000 Algiers	4×400 m
Gold medal – first place	2002 Radès	800 m
Bronze medal – third place	1998 Dakar	800 m

Aïssa Djabir Saïd-Guerni (Arabic: عيسى جبير سعيد قرني, born 29 March 1977) is a retired Algerian athlete who predominantly competed in the 800 metres. Saïd-Guerni competed at the 2000 Summer Olympics and 2004 Summer Olympics in the 800 metres, and was also the flag bearer for Algeria at both these games.

He announced his retirement on 6 May 2007, following injury problems. His personal best time was 1:43.09 minutes, achieved in September 1999 in Brussels.

== Competition record ==
Year	Competition	Venue	Position	Event	Notes
Representing Algeria
1994	African Junior Championships	Algiers, Algeria	8th	1500 m	3:59.00
1994	African Junior Championships	Algiers, Algeria	2nd	4 × 100 m relay	41.58
1996	World Junior Championships	Sydney, Australia	20th (h)	800 m	1:52.06
1997	Pan Arab Games	Beirut, Lebanon	1st	800 m	1:46.84
1997	Pan Arab Games	Beirut, Lebanon	3rd	1500 m	?
1997	Pan Arab Games	Beirut, Lebanon	1st	4 × 400 m relay	3:05.59
1997	Mediterranean Games	Bari, Italy	3rd	800 m	1:47.76
1997	Universiade	Catania, Italy	6th	800 m	1:49.41
1998	African Championships	Dakar, Senegal	3rd	800 m	1:46.31
1999	Universiade	Palma de Mallorca, Spain	4th	800 m	1:46.75
1999	World Championships	Seville, Spain	3rd	800 m	1:44.18
1999	All-Africa Games	Johannesburg, South Africa	2nd	800 m	1:45.32
2000	African Championships	Algiers, Algeria	1st	800 m	1:45.88
2000	African Championships	Algiers, Algeria	1st	4 × 400 m relay	3:05.45
2000	Olympic Games	Sydney, Australia	3rd	800 m	1:45.16
2002	African Championships	Radès, Tunisia	1st	800 m	1:45.52
2003	World Championships	Paris, France	1st	800 m	1:44.81
2004	Olympic Games	Athens, Greece	7th	800 m	1:45.61
2005	World Championships	Helsinki, Finland	7th	800 m	1:45.31

Olympic Games
Preceded by Karim El-Mahouab	Flagbearer for Algeria; 2000 Sydney; 2004 Athens	Succeeded by Christelle Douibi
