= Athletics at the 2007 Pan American Games – Men's 1500 metres =

Men's 1500 metres at the Pan American Games

The men's 1500 metres event at the 2007 Pan American Games was held on July 25.

== Results ==
Rank	Name	Nationality	Time	Notes
1st place, gold medalist(s)	Hudson de Souza	Brazil	3:36.32	GR
2nd place, silver medalist(s)	Juan Luis Barrios	Mexico	3:37.71	PB
3rd place, bronze medalist(s)	Bayron Piedra	Ecuador	3:37.88	PB
4	Javier Carriqueo	Argentina	3:38.62	PB
5	Fabiano Peçanha	Brazil	3:39.58	SB
6	Eduar Villanueva	Venezuela	3:41.74	PB
7	Nico Herrera	Venezuela	3:42.18	PB
8	Luis Soto	Puerto Rico	3:42.49	PB
9	Leslie Encina	Chile	3:45.99	PB
10	Mauris Surel Castillo	Cuba	3:48.82	
11	Mario Bazan	Peru	3:51.38	
12	David Freeman	Puerto Rico	3:55.84	
13	Juan Odalis Almonte	Dominican Republic	3:55.95	
14	Andrew McClary	United States	4:03.58	
15	Masai Jeffers	Saint Kitts and Nevis	4:09.47	
