= Tyler Mulder =

American track and field athlete (born 1987)

Personal information
- Born: 15 February 1987 (age 38) Orange City, Iowa, United States

Sport
- Sport: Track and field

Tyler Mulder (born February 15, 1987) is an American track and field athlete. He was the 2008 NCAA Indoor Track and Field National Champion in the 800 meter run.

== High school career ==
Mulder competed for Unity Christian High School in Orange City, Iowa from 2001-2005. He set Iowa High School Athletic Association state meet records in the 800 meter run and as part of the 1600-meter medley relay.

== College career ==
=== Freshman year ===
Mulder matriculated to the University of Northern Iowa in the fall of 2005 where he was coached by Chris Bucknam and Doug Case. He garnered All Missouri Valley Conference honors in the 4x400 meter relay when his team placed second indoors. His indoor 800m season best was set at the ISU Classic, clocking 1:52.1. Outdoors, he lowered his personal best in the 800m run to 1:50.93 at the Mark Messersmith Invitational, narrowly missing qualifying for NCAA Regional competition.

=== Sophomore year ===
Mulder lowered his indoor personal best to 1:49.15 at the ISU Classic, placing fourth. Outdoors, he qualified for the NCAA championships in the 4x400 meter relay, earning All American honors by placing sixth. Mulder's personal best in outdoors was set at 1:49.19 at the Iowa Musco Twilight Meet.

=== Junior year ===
Mulder captured NCAA Championship in the 800 meter run indoors, clocking 1:49.2 at the Tyson Events Center in Fayetteville, Arkansas. Outdoors, advanced to the finals of the 800m run at the NCAA Championships in Des Moines, Iowa at Drake Stadium. Mulder placed fifth. Competed at the 2008 United States Olympic Track and Field Trials in Eugene, Oregon and failed to make finals.

=== Senior year ===
Mulder finished his senior year for the Panthers with a 3rd place Indoors, 3rd place Outdoors, and made the USATF 800m final. Lowered his personal best to 1:46.80 in the NCAA Championships in Fayetteville, Arkansas.

== Professional career ==
Mulder signed with Nike after his 2009 collegiate season. Later joining the Oregon Track Club in 2010. He is coached by Olympic bronze medalist Mark Rowland and trains in Eugene, OR.

He ran the 800 meter leg of the American Record setting indoor distance medley relay on February 12, 2010.

Mulder improved his 800-meter times over the last 5+ years:
2014 1:4X X
2013 1:44.34 Monaco 19 JUL
2012 1:44.75 Lignano Sabbiadoro 17 JUL
2011 1:44.83 Barcelona 22 JUL
2011 1:44.83 Los Angeles (OC), CA 21 MAY
2010 1:46.32 Tanger 18 JUL
2009 1:46.80 Fayetteville, AR 13 JUN

Other Notable times:

Mile: 3:57.37 penn relays 2013

1000m: 2:17.91 Pre classic 2010

1500m: 3:42.53 Oregon Relays 2012
