= Fabiano Peçanha =

Brazilian middle-distance runner

Personal information
- Nationality: Brazil
- Born: June 5, 1982 (age 44) Cruz Alta, Brazil
- Height: 1.86 m (6 ft 1 in)
- Weight: 74 kg (163 lb)

Sport
- Sport: Athletics
Medal record
Men's Athletics
Representing Brazil
Pan American Games
Bronze medal – third place	2003 S.Domingo	800m
Bronze medal – third place	2007 Rio	800m
Universiade
Gold medal – first place	2005 İzmir	800m
Silver medal – second place	2007 Bangkok	800m
Bronze medal – third place	2003 Daegu	800m
Bronze medal – third place	2003 Daegu	1500m
Bronze medal – third place	2007 Bangkok	1500m
Bronze medal – third place	2009 Belgrade	800m
South American Youth Championships
Silver medal – second place	1998 Manaus	800 m
Silver medal – second place	1998 Manaus	4x400 m relay
- Updated on 30 January 2015

Fabiano Peçanha (born June 5, 1982 in Cruz Alta, Rio Grande do Sul) is a Brazilian middle distance runner. He is a quadruple South American champion in 800 metres and 1500 metres. Peçanha studied at the Lutheran University of Brazil and represented his country at four consecutive Summer Universiades, winning six medals. He has also represented Brazil at two Olympics (2008 and 2012), reaching the semi-final on both occasions.

== Personal bests ==
- 800 metres - 1:44.60
- 1500 metres - 3:38.45 (2004)

== Competition record ==
Year	Competition	Venue	Position	Event	Notes
Representing Brazil
1998	South American Youth Championships	Manaus, Brazil	2nd	800 m	1:58.69 min
1998	South American Youth Championships	Manaus, Brazil	2nd	4 × 400 m relay	3:23.23 min
2000	South American Junior Championships	São Leopoldo, Brazil	3rd	800 m	1:52.42
2000	South American Junior Championships	São Leopoldo, Brazil	3rd	1500 m	3:54.89
2001	South American Cross Country Championships (U20)	Rio de Janeiro, Brazil	17th^{1}	8 km	27:27
2001	South American Road Mile Championships	Rio de Janeiro, Brazil	6th	One mile	4:13
2001	South American Junior Championships	Santa Fe, Argentina	2nd	800 m	1:48.90
2001	South American Junior Championships	Santa Fe, Argentina	1st	1500 m	3:52.21
2001	Pan American Junior Championships	Santa Fe, Argentina	1st	1500 m	3:50.38
2002	South American Road Mile Championships	Belém, Brazil	2nd	One mile	4:03
2003	South American Road Mile Championships	Belém, Brazil	2nd	One mile	4:12
2003	South American Championships	Barquisimeto, Venezuela	1st	800 m	1:46.32
2003	South American Championships	Barquisimeto, Venezuela	1st	1500 m	3:39.74
2003	Pan American Games	Santo Domingo, Dominican Republic	3rd	800 m	1:46.39
2003	Universiade	Daegu, South Korea	3rd	800 m	1:48.20
2003	Universiade	Daegu, South Korea	3rd	1500 m	3:43.91
2004	South American Cross Country Championships	Macaé, Brazil	12th	4 km	12:03
2004	South American Cross Country Championships	Macaé, Brazil	3rd	Team (4 km)	18 pts
2004	World Indoor Championships	Budapest, Hungary	16th (sf)	800 m	1:51.59
2004	South American Road Mile Championships	Belém, Brazil	1st	One mile	4:01
2004	South American U23 Championships	Barquisimeto, Venezuela	3rd	800 m	1:48.66
2005	South American Championships	Cali, Colombia	1st	800 m	1:47.02
2005	South American Championships	Cali, Colombia	1st	1500 m	3:41.51
2005	World Championships	Helsinki, Finland	43rd (h)	800 m	1:50.89
2005	Universiade	İzmir, Turkey	1st	800 m	1:46.01
2006	South American Championships	Tunja, Colombia	1st	800 m	1:49.55
2006	South American Championships	Tunja, Colombia	4th	1500 m	3:59.27
2007	South American Road Mile Championships	Belém, Brazil	1st	One mile	4:09
2007	South American Championships	São Paulo, Brazil	7th	1500m	3:50.55
2007	Pan American Games	Rio de Janeiro, Brazil	3rd	800 m	1:45.54
2007	Pan American Games	Rio de Janeiro, Brazil	5th	1500 m	3:39.58
2007	Universiade	Bangkok, Thailand	2nd	800 m	1:46.11
2007	Universiade	Bangkok, Thailand	3rd	1500 m	3:40.98
2007	World Championships	Osaka, Japan	14th (sf)	800 m	1:45.95
2008	World Indoor Championships	Valencia, Spain	17th (sf)	800 m	1:49.63
2008	Ibero-American Championships	Iquique, Chile	2nd	800 m	1:47.83
2008	Ibero-American Championships	Iquique, Chile	1st	1500 m	3:42.06
2008	Olympic Games	Beijing, China	18th (sf)	800 m	1:47.07
2009	South American Championships	Lima, Peru	1st	800 m	1:47.82
2009	Universiade	Belgrade, Serbia	3rd	800 m	1:48.07
2009	World Championships	Berlin, Germany	11th (sf)	800 m	1:45.94
2010	World Indoor Championships	Doha, Qatar	6th (sf)	800 m	1:49.70
2010	South American Road Mile Championships	Belém, Brazil	1st	One mile	4:05
2010	Ibero-American Championships	San Fernando, Cádiz	5th	800 m	1:47.06
2012	South American Road Mile Championships	Belém, Brazil	1st	One mile	3:59
2012	Ibero-American Championships	Barquisimeto, Venezuela	2nd	800 m	1:47.16
2012	Ibero-American Championships	Barquisimeto, Venezuela	6th	1500 m	3:50.33
2012	Olympic Games	London, United Kingdom	19th (sf)	800 m	1:46.29
2013	South American Road Mile Championships	Belém, Brazil	6th	One mile	4:16

^{1}: Running out of competition.
