= Yuriy Borzakovskiy =

Russian middle-distance runner

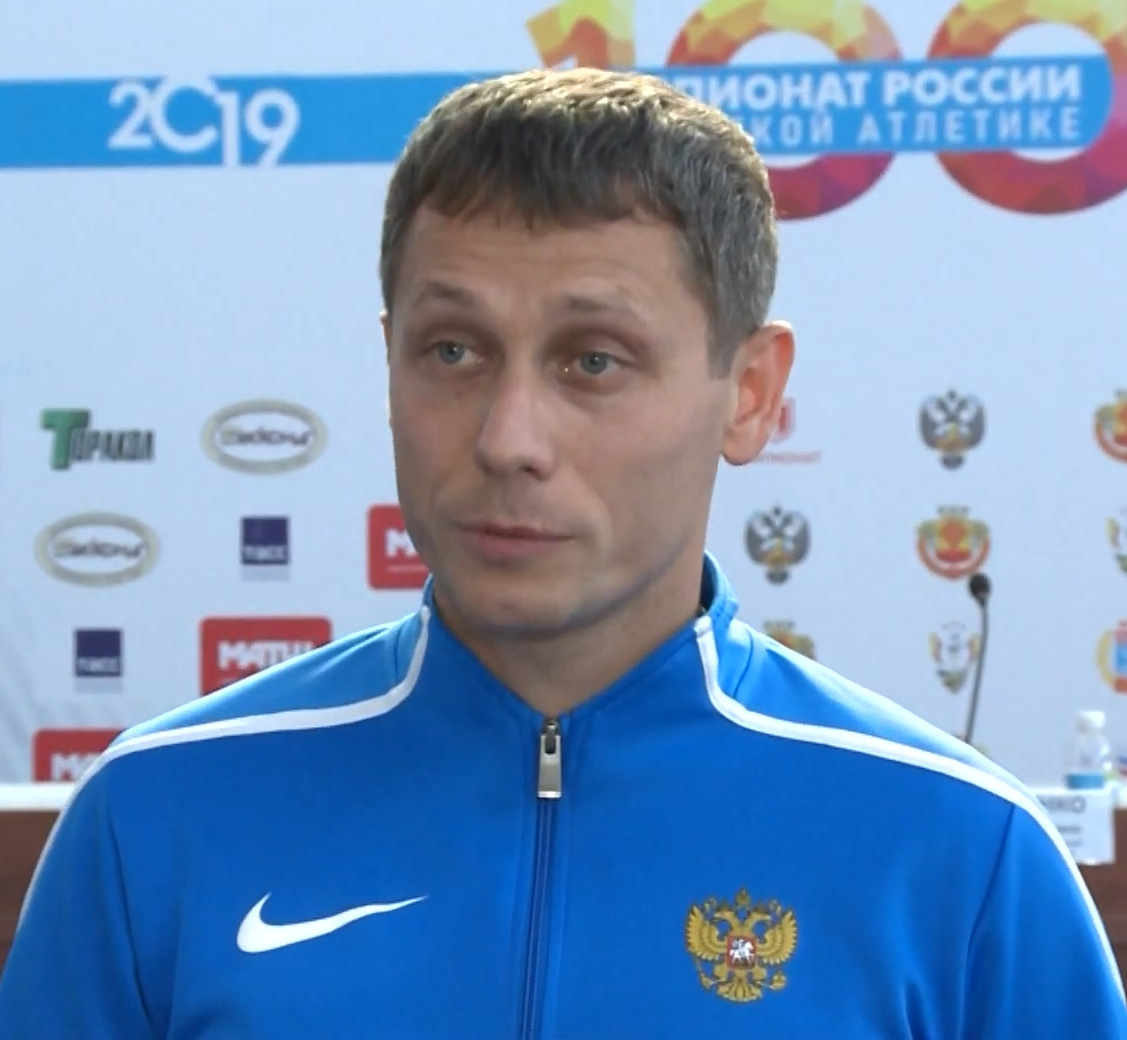
- Borzakovskiy in 2019

Personal information
- Nationality: Russian
- Born: 12 April 1981 (age 45) Kratovo, Russian SFSR, USSR

Sport
- Country: Russia
- Sport: Men's athletics
- Event: 800 metres

Achievements and titles
- Personal bests: 400 metres: 45.84; 800 metres: 1:42.47
Medal record
Men's athletics
Representing Russia
Olympic Games
Gold medal – first place	2004 Athens	800 m
World Championships
Silver medal – second place	2003 Paris	800 m
Silver medal – second place	2005 Helsinki	800 m
Bronze medal – third place	2007 Osaka	800 m
Bronze medal – third place	2011 Daegu	800 m
World Indoor Championships
Gold medal – first place	2001 Lisbon	800 m
Bronze medal – third place	2006 Moscow	800 m
European Championships
Gold medal – first place	2012 Helsinki	800 m
Silver medal – second place	2002 Munich	4×400 m
European Indoor Championships
Gold medal – first place	2000 Gent	800 m
Gold medal – first place	2009 Torino	800 m

Yuriy Mikhailovich Borzakovskiy (Russian: Юрий Михайлович Борзаковский, Jurij Michajlovič Borzakovskij, born 12 April 1981) is a retired Russian middle-distance runner specializing in the 800 metres.

== Early life ==
Borzakovskiy was born at Kratovo, in the Moscow Oblast. He was named for the Soviet cosmonaut Yuri Gagarin.

== Athletic career ==
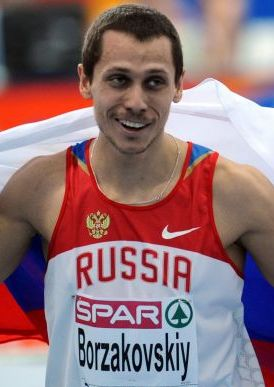
Borzakovskiy taking gold at the 2009 European Indoor Championships

Borzakovskiy's first major international success was a victory at the 2000 European Indoor Championships when he was only 18 years old. At the 2000 Summer Olympics he reached the 800 m final, in which he finished sixth. In 2001 he won the World Indoor title over 800 m but decided not to participate in the World Championships in Edmonton. On 24 August 2001, Borzakovskiy posted a time of 1:42.47 minutes. That currently makes him the 12th fastest man in history over that distance. In addition, Borzakovskiy was ranked No.1 in the world in that year. In 2002, Borzakovskiy ran the 400 m at the European Championships in Munich but was eliminated in the early stages. The following season he picked up a silver medal over 800 m at the World Championships in Paris.

Borzakovskiy's greatest achievement was his victory in the 800 m race at the Athens Olympics in 2004. By this point, he was well known for sitting back until about the last 200 metres and then using a great kick to catch up and win, reminiscent of the tactics of United States's Dave Wottle. At the Olympics he employed the same strategy, using this 'late charge' to come from behind in the last 150 meters to pass world record holder Wilson Kipketer, who was leading with only 20 metres to go, and take the victory. Borzakovskiy's decisive pass so deflated Kipketer that he allowed Mbulaeni Mulaudzi to nip him at the line. As of 2024, Borzakovskiy remains the last non-Kenyan Olympic champion in the 800 metres.

In the 2005 World Championships he took silver in the 800 m competition, overtaking everyone but Bahrain's Rashid Ramzi on the final straight. Ramzi was disqualified from the 2008 Olympics for doping violations but so far has been allowed to keep his prior medals. At the 2006 World Indoor Championships he won a bronze medal. Borzakovskiy won a bronze medal at the 2007 World Championships in Osaka. The final ran at a very slow pace and he was boxed in on the final lap which slowed down his sprint in the last 100 m.

In 2008 he made an impressive comeback by posting a time of 1:42.79 minutes, his first time under 1:43 since 2001. He made the Olympic team at the Beijing Olympics but unexpectedly failed to qualify for the 800 m final, finishing only third in his semifinal heat.

In 2009 he won gold at the European Indoor Championships in 1:48.55. On 23 August he placed fourth at the final of the 12th IAAF World Championships in Berlin in 1:45.57. Most of his 2010 season was lost due to an injury.

In 2011, he achieved yet another podium finish with a bronze medal in the 800 meters at the 2011 IAAF World Outdoor Championships. In this race, Borzakovskiy ran most of the last lap in second place and was himself overtaken just before the finish line.

In 2012, he won the European Championships 800 metre gold medal, in Helsinki. At the 2012 London Olympics, he failed to make the finals as he was eliminated in the semi-final round.

== See also ==
- 800 metres at the Olympics
- 800 metres at the World Championships in Athletics
- List of 2004 Summer Olympics medal winners
- List of European Athletics Championships medalists (men)
- List of male middle-distance runners
- List of Olympic medalists in athletics (men)
- List of Russian sportspeople
- List of World Athletics Championships medalists (men)
