= Kléberson Davide =

Brazilian middle-distance runner

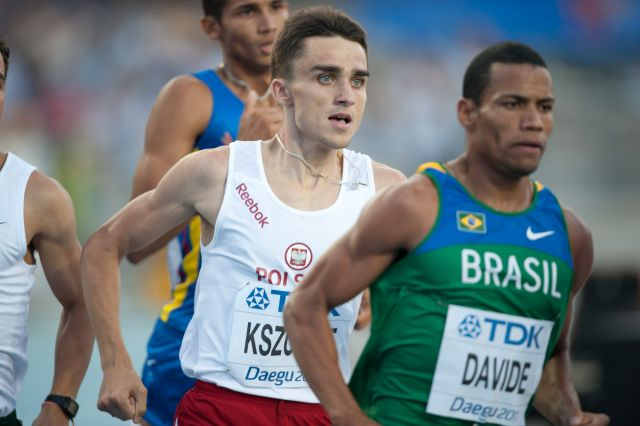
- Kléberson Davide (right) at the 2011 World Championships.

Personal information
- Full name: Kléberson Davide Krasucki
- Nationality: Brazil
- Born: 20 July 1985 (age 40) Conchal, São Paulo
- Height: 1.73 m (5 ft 8 in)
- Weight: 68 kg (150 lb)

Sport
- Sport: Athletics
Medal record
Men's Athletics
Representing Brazil
Pan American Games
Silver medal – second place	2007 Rio	800m
Silver medal – second place	2011 Guadalajara	800m
Lusophony Games
Gold medal – first place	Macau 2006	800 m
European Athletics U23 Championships
South American Games
Gold medal – first place	2014 Santiago	800 m
Gold medal – first place	2014 Santiago	4×400 m relay
South American Junior Championships
Silver medal – second place	2003 Guayaquil	800 m
South American Youth Championships
Gold medal – first place	2002 Asunción	800 m
- Updated on 13 October 2015

Kléberson Davide (born 20 July 1985) is a Brazilian track and field athlete who specialises in the 800 metres.

Born in Conchal, São Paulo, Davide won his first major youth title in the 800 m at the 2002 South American Youth Championships. He reached the semi-finals of the 2004 World Junior Championships in Athletics. He made his first impression on the senior circuit in 2007: he became the 800 m national champion, took the silver medal at the 2007 Pan American Games, and reached the semis at the 2007 World Championships in Athletics. Under the guidance of coach Clodoaldo Lopes do Carmo (an Olympic finalist and former South American record holder), Davide represented Brazil at the 2008 Summer Olympics.

Davide started the 2009 outdoor season strongly, setting a new personal best and world leading time of 1:44.67 in April. At the Grande Prêmio Brasil Caixa meet Davide again improved his personal best, beating his previous mark by 0.02 seconds. His coach stated that he expected Davide to reach 1:44.5 minutes at the 2009 World Championships in Berlin. He took silver at the 2009 South American Championships in Athletics with a time of 1:49.33, finishing behind compatriot Fabiano Peçanha.

On January 21, 2012, he married sprinter Franciela Krasucki in Valinhos, São Paulo.

== Major competitions record ==
Year	Competition	Venue	Position	Event	Notes
Representing Brazil
2002	South American Junior Championships / South American Games	Belém, Brazil	4th	800 m	1:51.81
2002	South American Youth Championships	Asunción, Paraguay	1st	800 m	1:57.53
2003	South American Junior Championships	Guayaquil, Ecuador	2nd	800 m	1:51.41
2004	World Junior Championships	Grosseto, Italy	16th (sf)	800 m	1:51.97
2006	Lusophony Games	Macau	1st	800 m	1:50.50
2006	Lusophony Games	Macau	1st	4 × 400 m relay	3:07.81
2006	South American U23 Championships	Buenos Aires, Argentina	1st	800 m	1:51.20
2006	South American U23 Championships	Buenos Aires, Argentina	1st	4 × 400 m relay	3:08.38
2007	South American Championships	São Paulo, Brazil	1st	800 m	1:49.61
2007	Pan American Games	Rio de Janeiro, Brazil	2nd	800 m	1:45.47
2007	World Championships	Osaka, Japan	17th (sf)	800 m	1:46.45
2008	Olympic Games	Beijing, China	45th (h)	800 m	1:48.53
2009	South American Championships	Lima, Peru	2nd	800 m	1:49.33
2009	World Championships	Berlin, Germany	22nd (h)	800 m	1:47.51
2010	World Indoor Championships	Doha, Qatar	9th (h)	800 m	1:49.69
2010	Ibero-American Championships	San Fernando, Spain	2nd	800 m	1:45.82
2010	Ibero-American Championships	San Fernando, Spain	2nd	4 × 400 m relay	3:05.43
2011	South American Championships	Buenos Aires, Argentina	1st	400 m	46.74
2011	South American Championships	Buenos Aires, Argentina	2nd	800 m	1:52.42
2011	South American Championships	Buenos Aires, Argentina	1st	4 × 400 m relay	3:08.95
2011	World Championships	Daegu, South Korea	7th (sf)	800 m	1:45.06
2011	Pan American Games	Guadalajara, Mexico	2nd	800 m	1:45.75
2013	World Championships	Moscow, Russia	35th (h)	800 m	1:48.28
2014	South American Games	Santiago, Chile	1st	800 m	1:45.30
2014	South American Games	Santiago, Chile	1st	4 × 400 m relay	3:03.94
2016	Ibero-American Championships	Rio de Janeiro, Brazil	2nd	800 m	1:45.79
2016	Olympic Games	Rio de Janeiro, Brazil	19th (sf)	800 m	1:46.19

== Personal bests ==
Event	Time	Venue	Date
400 metres	46.16 s	São Paulo, Brazil	17 September 2010
800 metres	1:44.21 min	São Paulo, Brazil	7 August 2011
800 metres (indoor)	1:49.69 min	Doha, Qatar	12 March 2010
1000 metres	2:20.75 min	Belém, Brazil	21 May 2006
1500 metres	3:46.38 min	São Paulo, Brazil	23 February 2013

- All information taken from IAAF profile.
