= Athletics at the 2007 Pan American Games – Men's 800 metres =

Men's 800 metres at the Pan American Games

The men's 800 metres event at the 2007 Pan American Games was held on July 27–28.

== Medalists ==
Gold	Silver	Bronze
Yeimer López; Cuba	Kléberson Davide; Brazil	Fabiano Peçanha; Brazil

== Results ==
=== Heats ===
Qualification: First 2 of each heat (Q) and the next 2 fastest (q) qualified for the final.

Rank	Heat	Name	Nationality	Time	Notes
1	1	Yeimer López	Cuba	1:46.69	Q, SB
2	3	Fabiano Peçanha	Brazil	1:46.73	Q
3	3	Aldwyn Sappleton	Jamaica	1:46.84	Q, PB
4	1	Achraf Tadili	Canada	1:47.07	Q
5	3	David Freeman	Puerto Rico	1:47.27	q
6	1	Gustavo Aguirre	Argentina	1:47.60	q
7	3	Duane Solomon	United States	1:47.73	
8	1	Eduar Villanueva	Venezuela	1:48.05	PB
9	3	Fadrique Iglesias	Bolivia	1:48.27	SB
10	3	Moise Joseph	Haiti	1:48.35	
11	1	Jamaal James	Trinidad and Tobago	1:48.52	
12	3	Bayron Piedra	Ecuador	1:48.56	
13	2	Kléberson Davide	Brazil	1:49.31	Q
14	2	Andy González	Cuba	1:49.94	Q
15	2	Martell Carlos Munguia	Mexico	1:50.03	
16	2	Andrae Drummonds	Jamaica	1:50.68	
17	2	Sherridan Kirk	Trinidad and Tobago	1:52.05	
18	1	Jenner Pelico	Guatemala	1:55.52	
19	2	Raffique Providence	Saint Vincent and the Grenadines	1:57.82	
	2	Kadeem Smith	Saint Kitts and Nevis	DNS	

=== Final ===
Rank	Name	Nationality	Time	Notes
1st place, gold medalist(s)	Yeimer López	Cuba	1:44.58	GR
2nd place, silver medalist(s)	Kléberson Davide	Brazil	1:45.47	PB
3rd place, bronze medalist(s)	Fabiano Peçanha	Brazil	1:45.54	SB
4	Achraf Tadili	Canada	1:46.07	
5	Andy González	Cuba	1:47.06	SB
6	Aldwyn Sappleton	Jamaica	1:47.14	
7	Gustavo Aguirre	Argentina	1:47.23	PB
8	David Freeman	Puerto Rico	1:47.31	
