= Moise Joseph =

Haitian middle-distance runner

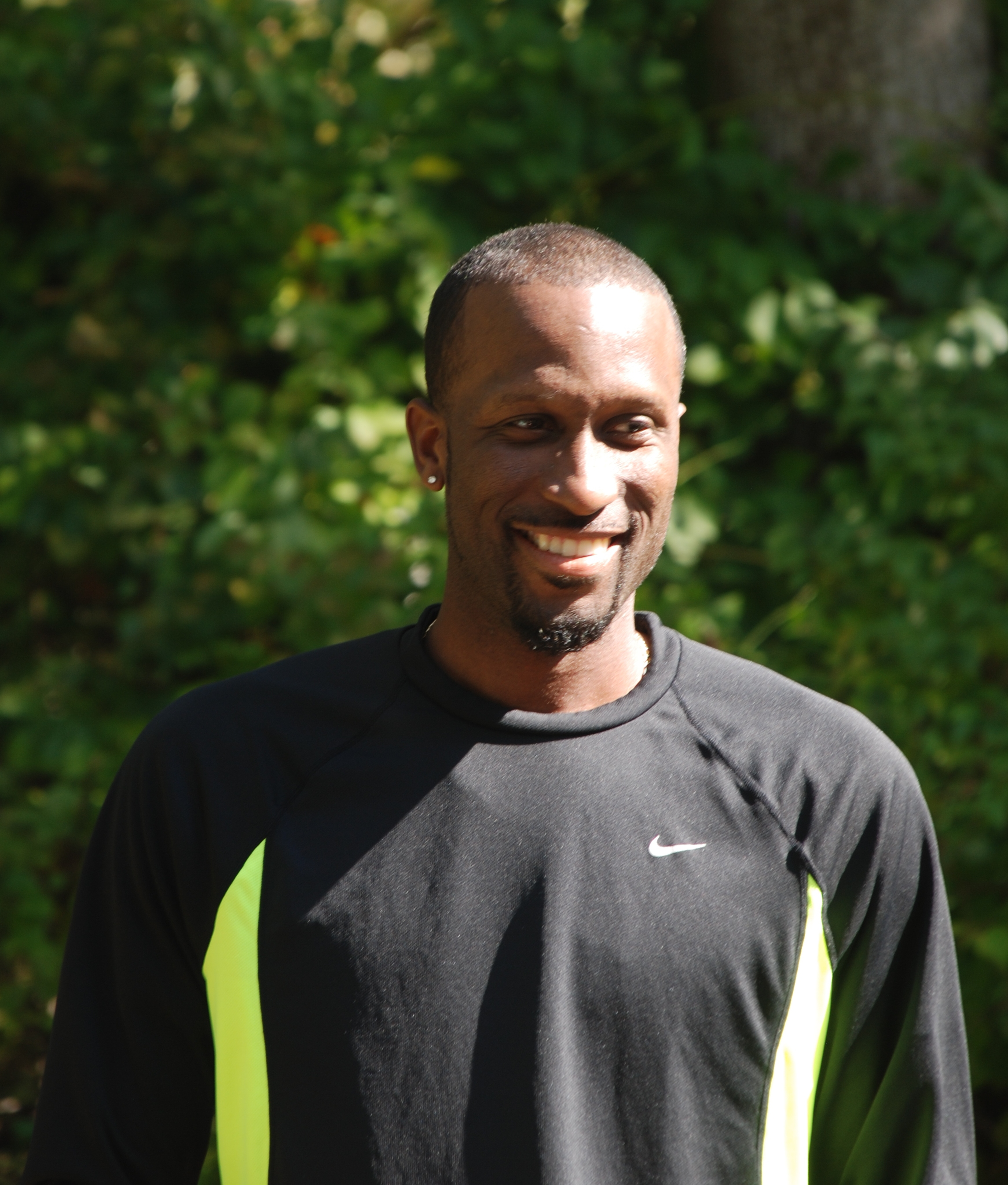
- Moise Joseph at a fundraising event in Fairfax, Virginia

Personal information
- Nationality: Haitian
- Born: 27 December 1981 (age 44) Miami, Florida, United States
- Height: 1.82 m (6 ft 0 in)
- Weight: 75 kg (165 lb)

Sport
- Sport: Athletics
- Event: 800 m

Achievements and titles
- Personal best: 800 meters: 1:45.74
Medal record
Representing Haiti
Men's athletics
CACAC Games
| Silver medal – second place | 2010 Mayagüez | 800 m |
CACAC Championships
| Silver medal – second place | 2011 Mayagüez | 800 m |
| Bronze medal – third place | 2005 Nassau | 800 m |
- Updated on 16 December 2014

Moise Joseph (born 27 December 1981) is a Haitian middle-distance runner specializing in the 800 meters. He competed at the Summer Olympics in 2004 and 2012.

== Running career ==
=== High school ===
Born in Miami, Joseph attended Miami Central High School until he graduated in 2000. There he was coached by John A. Rolle, and ended up recording personal bests of 1:50.30 in the 800 meters, 4:10.85 in the 1600 meters, and 9:21.43 in the 3200 meters.

=== Collegiate ===
Joseph was recruited to University of Florida, where he specialized in the 800 meters. He qualified for three consecutive NCAA finals in 2002, 2003, and 2004, the best result of which was a third-place finish in the men's 800 final in 2002. In his senior year at Florida, he qualified for the 2004 Summer Olympics and went on to compete for Haiti.

== Personal bests ==
Outdoors

- 800m 1:45.74 – Baton Rouge, United States, 2002
- 1000m 2:19.06 – New York City, United States, 2005
- 1500m 3:45.54 – Starkville, United States, 2002

Indoors

- 800m 1:47.56 – Karlsruhe, Germany 2006
- 1500m 3:45.93 – New York City, United States, 2011

== Achievements ==
| Year | Competition | Venue | Position | Event | Notes |
Representing the United States
| 2002 | NACAC U-25 Championships | San Antonio, United States | 5th | 800m | 1:49.62 |
Representing Haiti
| 2004 | Olympic Games | Athens, Greece | 52nd (h) | 800m | 1:48.15 |
| 2005 | Central American and Caribbean Championships | Nassau, Bahamas | 3rd | 800m | 1:49.60 |
| 2005 | World Championships | Helsinki, Finland | 25th (h) | 800m | 1:48.29 |
| 2006 | World Indoor Championships | Moscow, Russia | 10th (h) | 800m | 1:48.33 |
| 2006 | Central American and Caribbean Games | Cartagena, Colombia | 4th | 800m | 1:47.93 |
| 2007 | NACAC Championships | San Salvador, El Salvador | 3rd | 800m | 1:50.25 |
| 2007 | Pan American Games | Rio de Janeiro, Brazil | 10th (h) | 800m | 1:48.35 |
| 2008 | World Indoor Championships | Valencia, Spain | 18th (h) | 800m | 1:49.70 |
| 2008 | Central American and Caribbean Championships | Cali, Colombia | 4th | 800m | 1:48.62 A |
| 2009 | World Championships | Berlin, Germany | 9th (sf) | 800m | 1:45.87 |
| 2010 | World Indoor Championships | Doha, Qatar | 13th (h) | 800m | 1:50.43 |
| 2010 | Central American and Caribbean Games | Mayagüez, Puerto Rico | 2nd | 800m | 1:47.79 |
| 2011 | Central American and Caribbean Championships | Mayagüez, Puerto Rico | 2nd | 800m | 1:48.94 |
| 2011 | Central American and Caribbean Championships | Mayagüez, Puerto Rico | 8th | 4 × 400 m relay | 3:10.28 |
| 2011 | World Championships | Daegu, South Korea | 28th (h) | 800m | 1:48.17 |
| 2011 | Pan American Games | Guadalajara, Mexico | 8th | 800m | 1:54.88 A |
| 2012 | Olympic Games | London, United Kingdom | 36th (h) | 800m | 1:48.46 |
| 2014 | Central American and Caribbean Games | Xalapa, Mexico | 5th (h) | 800m | 1:52.69 A |
