= Yeimer López =

Cuban runner (born 1982)

Personal information
- Full name: Yeimer López García
- Born: August 28, 1982 (age 43) Buey Arriba, Granma
- Height: 1.85 m (6 ft 1 in)
- Weight: 78 kg (172 lb)

Sport
- Country: Cuba
- Sport: Athletics
Medal record
Men's Athletics
Representing Cuba
Pan American Games
Gold medal – first place	2007 Rio de Janeiro	800 metres
Silver medal – second place	2003 Santo Domingo	400 metres
Central American and Caribbean Games
Gold medal – first place	2006 Cartagena	400 metres
- Updated on 5 June 2013

Yeimer López García (born August 28, 1982, in Buey Arriba, Granma) is a middle-distance runner from Cuba, who represented his native country at two consecutive Summer Olympics, starting in 2004.

He is best known for winning the gold medal in the men's 800 metres at the 2007 Pan American Games in Brazil. López is the twin brother (fraternal) of female sprinter Ana López.

== Personal bests ==
- 400 m: 45.11 s – Saint-Denis, 24 August 2003
- 400 m (indoor): 47.98 s – Sabadell, 22 January 2011
- 800 m: 1:43.07 min – Jerez de la Frontera, 24 June 2008

== International competitions ==
Year	Competition	Venue	Position	Event	Notes
Representing Cuba
2003	Pan American Games	Santo Domingo, Dominican Republic	2nd	400 m	45.13 s
2003	Pan American Games	Santo Domingo, Dominican Republic	6th	4 × 400 m	3:06.27 min
2003	World Championships	Paris, France	9th (sf)	400 m	45.11 s
2004	Ibero-American Championships	Huelva, Spain	2nd	400 m	45.21 s
2004	Olympic Games	Athens, Greece	12th (sf)	400 m	45.52 s
2005	Central American and Caribbean Championships	Nassau, Bahamas	1st	800 m	1:47.64 min
2005	Central American and Caribbean Championships	Nassau, Bahamas	3rd	4 × 400 m	3:02.33 min
2005	World Championships	Helsinki, Finland	45th (h)	800 m	1:52.24 min
2006	Central American and Caribbean Games	Cartagena, Colombia	1st	400 m	45.28 s
2006	Central American and Caribbean Games	Cartagena, Colombia	6th (h)	4 × 400 m	3:08.71 min
2007	ALBA Games	Caracas, Venezuela	1st	800 m	1:47.25 min
2007	ALBA Games	Caracas, Venezuela	1st	4 × 400 m	3:06.84 min
2007	Pan American Games	Rio de Janeiro, Brazil	1st	800 m	1:44.58 min
2007	World Championships	Osaka, Japan	26th (h)	800 m	1:46.28 min
2008	Ibero-American Championships	Iquique, Chile	1st	4 × 400 m	3:03.22 min
2008	Central American and Caribbean Championships	Cali, Colombia	1st	4 × 400 m	3:02.10 min
2008	Olympic Games	Beijing, China	6th	800 m	1:45.88 min
2009	ALBA Games	Havana, Cuba	1st	800 m	1:45.00 min
2009	Central American and Caribbean Championships	Havana, Cuba	1st	800 m	1:45.56 min
2009	Central American and Caribbean Championships	Havana, Cuba	1st	4 × 400 m	3:03.26 min
2009	World Championships	Berlin, Germany	10th	800 m	1:47.80 min
2010	Ibero-American Championships	San Fernando, Spain	1st	800 m	1:45.36 min
2010	Ibero-American Championships	San Fernando, Spain	1st	4 × 400 m	3:04.86 min
