= Ramil Aritkulov =

Russian middle-distance runner

Ramil Kamilevich Aritkulov (Russian: Рамиль Камильевич Ариткулов, born 1 March 1978) is a Russian middle-distance runner who specializes in the 800 metres.

He participated at the 2002 European Championships, the 2004 Summer Olympics, the 2006 World Indoor Championships and the 2006 European Championships. He finished fifth in 1500 m at the 2006 IAAF World Cup and won a silver medal in 800 m at the 2003 Summer Universiade.

Artikulov is an ethnic Tatar. He was born in Kerki.

== Personal bests ==
- 800 metres - 1:45.28 min (2004)
- 1500 metres - 3:40.54 min (2006)
