= Mouhssin Chehibi =

Moroccan middle-distance runner

Personal information
- Born: 28 January 1978 (age 48) Tetuan, Morocco

Sport
- Sport: Track and field
Medal record
Representing Morocco
African Championships
Bronze medal – third place	2000 Algiers	800 m

Mouhssin Chehibi (Arabic: محسن الشهيبي; born 28 January 1978) is a former Moroccan middle-distance runner who specialized in the 800 metres.

His personal best time over the distance is 1:44.16 minutes, achieved in July 2006 in Athens.

== International competitions ==
Year	Competition	Venue	Position	Notes
2000	African Championships	Algiers, Algeria	3rd	800 m
2001	Universiade	Beijing, China	6th	800 m
2001	Francophonie Games	Ottawa, Canada	2nd	800 m
2002	African Championships	Radès, Tunisia	4th	800 m
2004	Olympic Games	Athens, Greece	4th	800 m
2006	World Indoor Championships	Moscow, Russia	21st	800 m
