= Amine Laâlou =

Moroccan middle-distance runner

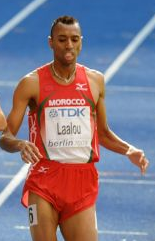
- Laâlou at the 2009 World Championships

Personal information
- Born: 13 May 1982 (age 44) Salé, Morocco

Sport
- Country: Morocco
- Sport: Track
- Events: 800 metres, 1500 metres

Achievements and titles
- Personal bests: 400 metres: 47.57; 800 metres: 1:43.25; 1500 metres: 3:29.53
Medal record
Men's athletics
Representing Morocco
African Championships
Silver medal – second place	2010 Nairobi	1500 m
Mediterranean Games
Gold medal – first place	2009 Pescara	800 m
Bronze medal – third place	2005 Almería	800 m
Representing Africa
IAAF Continental Cup
Gold medal – first place	2010 Split	1500 m

Amine Laâlou (born 13 May 1982) is a Moroccan track and field athlete, who specializes in middle-distance running. He represented his country at the Summer Olympics on two occasions: 2004 and 2008. He began his career as an 800 metres specialist and made his global debut at the 2003 World Championships in Athletics. He won medals at smaller international competitions, including the 2004 Pan Arab Games and 2005 Mediterranean Games. He reached his first global final at the 2007 World Championships, taking sixth, and was a semi-finalist at the 2008 Summer Olympics.

He began competing in the 1500 metres and was a double finalist at the 2009 World Championships. He also won gold medals at the 2009 Mediterranean Games and 2009 Jeux de la Francophonie that year. In 2010 he won silver at the 2010 African Championships and was the 1500 m champion at the 2010 IAAF Continental Cup. His personal best over the 800 m is 1:43.25, which is the Moroccan record for the event.

Laâlou has received two doping bans during his career.

== Career ==
Born in Salé, Laâlou started his international track career competing at the younger levels, running over 800 m at the inaugural World Youth Championships in 1999 and reaching the semi-finals at the 2000 World Junior Championships. He won the silver medal at the 2001 African Junior Championships and made the 800 m semi-finals of the senior event at the 2002 African Championships. He made his senior debut on the global stage at the 2003 World Championships in Athletics, although he did not progress beyond the heats stage.

He came close to winning a medal at the 2004 World Indoor Championships but he missed out after coming fourth in the 800 m behind Brazil's Osmar dos Santos. He improved his personal best to 1:43.68 at the Weltklasse Zürich meeting prior to the 2004 Summer Olympics. He did not build on this form on his Olympic debut, however, as he was eliminated in his semi-final and finished in seventh place. Laâlou qualified for the 2004 IAAF World Athletics Final but again finished in seventh place. He closed his season on a high note as he reached the podium twice at the 2004 Pan Arab Games a month later, winning the bronze medal over 800 m and anchoring home the Moroccan 4×400 metres relay team to the silver medal behind Saudi Arabia.

The buildup to his 2005 outdoor season began with a gold medal at the Islamic Solidarity Games and he followed this with a regional bronze behind the Spanish contingent at the 2005 Mediterranean Games. He competed at the 2005 World Championships and was fifth in his semi-final. There were no major competitions for the Moroccan in 2006 but his year was highlighted by a win at the Golden Gala where he improved his 800 m best to 1:43.25, which made him the second fastest athlete of the season after Mbulaeni Mulaudzi. He also finished sixth at the 2006 World Athletics Final. He reached his first global final the following season, finishing sixth in the 800 m at the 2007 World Championships in Osaka. He was just short of the medals at the 2007 World Athletics Final with a fourth-place finish.

He performed poorly at the 2008 World Indoor Championships and failed to make it out of the 800 m heats. Competing in the 2008 IAAF Golden League circuit, he continued his rich vein of form at the Golden Gala with a win in 1:44.27. Taking part in his second Olympics, he was a semi-finalist in the 800 m at the 2008 Beijing Games. He began to add the 1500 metres to his oeuvre in the 2009 season and he reached both the 800 m and 1500 m finals at the 2009 World Championships in Athletics. He was tenth in the 1500 m but managed fifth place at his preferred 800 m event. He also became the regional 800 m champion with a win at the 2009 Mediterranean Games and an 800/1500 m double at the 2009 Jeux de la Francophonie.

In 2010 he improved his 1500 m best to 3:29.53 and his best in the mile run to 3:50.22. That year he was fifth over 1500 m at the 2010 World Indoor Championships, took the silver medal outdoors at the 2010 African Championships, and was selected for the Africa team at the 2010 IAAF Continental Cup, where he won the 1500 m gold medal. He took part in the Fifth Avenue Mile for the first time that September and beat Bernard Lagat to win the road race in a time of 3:52.83.

== Doping ban ==
It was reported on 3 August 2012 that Laalou has been banned from the 2012 Olympics after testing positive for furosemide. A two-year ban from competition was subsequently confirmed by the International Association of Athletics Federations. In April 2016 he tested positive for EPO in an out-of-competition test and was handed an 8-year ban set to end on 10 May 2024.

== International competition record ==
Year	Competition	Venue	Position	Event	Notes
Representing Morocco
2000	World Junior Championships	Santiago, Chile	16th (sf)	800m	3:00.54
2004	World Indoor Championships	Budapest, Hungary	4th	800 m	1:46.57
2004	World Athletics Final	Monte Carlo, Monaco	7th	800 m	1:46.74
2005	Mediterranean Games	Almería, Spain	3rd	800 m	1:47.58
2006	World Athletics Final	Stuttgart, Germany	7th	800 m	1:47.91
2009	Jeux de la Francophonie	Beirut, Lebanon	1st	800 m	1:46.68
2009	Jeux de la Francophonie	Beirut, Lebanon	1st	1500 m	3:51.59
2009	Mediterranean Games	Pescara, Italy	1st	800 m	1:46.76
2010	African Championships	Nairobi, Kenya	2nd	1500 m	3:36.38
2010	Continental Cup	Split, Croatia	1st	1500 m	3:35.49

== Personal bests ==
- 400 metres - 47.57 s (2005)
- 800 metres - 1:43.25 min (2006)
- 1500 metres - 3:29.53 min (2010)

As of 20 November 2024, Laâlou holds seven track records for distances ranging from 600 metres up to 1500 metres set over the period 2005 to 2017.
