= List of flag bearers for Guinea-Bissau at the Olympics =

Guinea-Bissau at the Olympics
- IOC code: GBS
- NOC: Guinea-Bissau Olympic Committee
- Website: cogb.gw
- Medals: Gold 0 Silver 0 Bronze 0 Total 0

Summer appearances
- 1996; 2000; 2004; 2008; 2012; 2016; 2020; 2024

Flag bearers carry the national flag of their country at the opening ceremony of the Olympic Games.

#	Event year	Season	Flag bearer	Sport	Ref.
1	1996	Summer	Talata Embalo	Wrestling	
2	2000	Summer	Talata Embalo	Wrestling	
3	2004	Summer	Leopoldina Ross	Wrestling	
4	2008	Summer	Augusto Midana	Wrestling	
5	2012	Summer	Augusto Midana	Wrestling	
6	2016	Summer	Augusto Midana	Wrestling	
7	2020	Summer	Taciana Cesar	Judo	
8	2024	Summer	Diamantino Iuna Fafé	Wrestling	
9	2026	Winter	Winston Tang	Alpine skiing	

== See also ==
- Guinea-Bissau at the Olympics
