= Guinea-Bissau at the 2026 Winter Olympics =

- Flag of Guinea-Bissau
- IOC code: GBS
- NOC: Guinea-Bissau Olympic Committee
- Website: cogb.gw

in Milan and Cortina d'Ampezzo, Italy 6 February 2026 – 22 February 2026
- Competitors: 1 (1 man) in 1 sport
- Flag bearer (opening): Winston Tang
- Flag bearer (closing): Winston Tang
- Medals: Gold 0 Silver 0 Bronze 0 Total 0

Winter Olympics appearances (overview)
- 2026

Guinea-Bissau competed at the men's slalom event at the 2026 Winter Olympics in Bormio, Italy, on 16 February 2026. It was its first time participating in the Winter Olympic Games.

Guinea-Bissau's participation in the Winter Olympics was enabled through Tang Wei-tsu, a Taiwanese American businessman and former Olympic skier, seeking investment opportunities in the Bissau-Guinean cashew industry. Tang met with government and non-government authorities in the country, and his participation in the 1988 Winter Olympics and 1992 Winter Olympics was mentioned. This led to the creation of the Winter Sports Federation of Guinea-Bissau so that the country could qualify for the Winter Olympics. The federation was founded in February 2024 and was made an associate member of the International Ski and Snowboard Federation (FIS) in June 2024.

In 2025, the Bissau-Guinean government promoted a vote amongst its ministers to grant Bissau-Guinean nationality to Winston Tang through his father's connection to the nation so that he could represent the country at the 2026 Winter Olympics. Tang changed his sporting nationality to Bissau-Guinean in June 2025 upon approval by the FIS. He began to train across Europe and was awarded an Olympic Scholarship by the International Olympic Committee to assist with his preparations for the Winter Games. Through the basic quota, Guinea-Bissau was eligible to send one male alpine skier to the Games. Winston was then selected as the first Bissau-Guinean to compete at the Winter Olympics and trained in Bosnia and Herzegovina before ultimately going to Milan. During the 2026 Winter Olympics opening ceremony, Tang was the flag bearer for the nation. Tang was also the country's flag bearer during the closing ceremony.

== Competitors ==
The following is the list of number of competitors participating at the Games per sport/discipline.

Sport	Men	Women	Total
Alpine skiing	1	0	1
Total	1	0	1

== Alpine skiing ==
Guinea-Bissau qualified one male alpine skier through the basic quota.

Athlete	Event	Run 1		Run 2		Total	
Athlete	Event	Time	Rank	Time	Rank	Time	Rank
Winston Tang	Men's slalom	DNF					
