= Athletics at the 1998 Commonwealth Games – Men's 800 metres =

Men's 800 metres at the Commonwealth Games

The men's 800 metres event at the 1998 Commonwealth Games was held 17–19 September on National Stadium, Bukit Jalil.

== Medalists ==
Gold	Silver	Bronze
Japheth Kimutai; Kenya	Hezekiél Sepeng; South Africa	Johan Botha; South Africa

== Results ==
=== Heats ===
Qualification: First 2 of each heat (Q) and the next 6 fastest (q) qualified for the semifinals.

Rank	Heat	Name	Nationality	Time	Notes
1	2	Japheth Kimutai	Kenya	1:47.49	Q
2	2	Paskar Owor	Uganda	1:47.90	Q, PB
3	1	Johan Botha	South Africa	1:48.16	Q
4	2	Jason Lobo	England	1:48.23	q
5	4	Savieri Ngidhi	Zimbabwe	1:48.24	Q
6	4	Hezekiél Sepeng	South Africa	1:48.31	Q
7	1	Bradley Donkin	England	1:48.32	Q
8	1	Glody Dube	Botswana	1:48.44	q
9	5	Kennedy Kimwetich	Kenya	1:48.48	Q
10	1	Shaun Farrell	New Zealand	1:48.51	q
11	4	Joseph Ischia	Australia	1:48.61	q
12	3	Andrew Hart	England	1:48.70	Q
13	3	Crispen Mutakanyi	Zimbabwe	1:48.89	Q
14	4	Veranus Kamati	Namibia	1:48.99	q, PB
15	2	Mao Tjiroze	Namibia	1:49.02	q, SB
16	2	Kenroy Levy	Jamaica	1:49.09	SB
17	5	Marvin Watts	Jamaica	1:49.19	Q
18	4	Grant Graham	Scotland	1:49.25	
19	5	Richard Girvan	Northern Ireland	1:49.33	
20	3	Eddie King	Northern Ireland	1:49.38	
21	5	Subramaniam Vasu	Malaysia	1:49.76	
22	5	Chipako Chungu	Zambia	1:49.80	
23	3	Dale Jones	Antigua and Barbuda	1:50.54	SB
24	3	Isireli Naikelekelevesi	Fiji	1:50.66	PB
25	1	Stephen Agar	Canada	1:51.07	
26	4	Mpho Morobe	Lesotho	1:51.45	
27	1	Ian Godwin	Saint Kitts and Nevis	1:52.01	
28	3	Chris Brown	Bahamas	1:52.76	
29	5	Dave Pamah	Saint Vincent and the Grenadines	1:52.91	
30	3	Reuben Silwimba	Zambia	1:53.31	
31	1	Gregory Chipman	Bahamas	1:54.57	
32	1	Nickie Peters	Saint Vincent and the Grenadines	1:55.78	
32	3	Kayless Tavakalo	Vanuatu	1:55.78	
35	4	Gerard Solomon	Vanuatu	1:57.87	
36	2	Mphafi Karabo	Lesotho	1:59.20	
	2	Naseer Ismail	Maldives	DNS	
	5	Selwyn Bonne	Seychelles	DNS	

=== Semifinals ===
Qualification: First 4 of each heat qualified directly (Q) for the final.

Rank	Heat	Name	Nationality	Time	Notes
1	2	Japheth Kimutai	Kenya	1:46.88	Q
2	1	Hezekiél Sepeng	South Africa	1:47.05	Q
3	1	Kennedy Kimwetich	Kenya	1:47.12	Q
4	1	Savieri Ngidhi	Zimbabwe	1:47.20	Q
5	1	Andrew Hart	England	1:47.34	Q
5	2	Johan Botha	South Africa	1:47.34	Q
7	2	Crispen Mutakanyi	Zimbabwe	1:47.58	Q
8	2	Bradley Donkin	England	1:47.65	Q
9	2	Glody Dube	Botswana	1:47.78	PB
10	1	Paskar Owor	Uganda	1:47.90	
11	2	Jason Lobo	England	1:47.96	
12	1	Marvin Watts	Jamaica	1:48.40	
13	2	Joseph Ischia	Australia	1:48.43	
14	2	Mao Tjiroze	Namibia	1:48.58	SB
15	1	Shaun Farrell	New Zealand	1:49.21	
16	1	Veranus Kamati	Namibia	1:49.22	

=== Final ===
Rank	Name	Nationality	Time	Notes
1st place, gold medalist(s)	Japheth Kimutai	Kenya	1:43.82	
2nd place, silver medalist(s)	Hezekiél Sepeng	South Africa	1:44.44	SB
3rd place, bronze medalist(s)	Johan Botha	South Africa	1:44.57	PB
4	Savieri Ngidhi	Zimbabwe	1:45.18	
5	Andrew Hart	England	1:45.71	PB
6	Bradley Donkin	England	1:46.86	PB
7	Crispen Mutakanyi	Zimbabwe	1:46.97	
8	Kennedy Kimwetich	Kenya	1:48.13	
