= Athletics at the 1996 Summer Olympics – Men's 800 metres =

Men's 800 metres at the Games of the XXVI Olympiad
- Venue: Centennial Olympic Stadium
- Dates: 28 to 31 July
- Competitors: 56 from 40 nations
- Winning time: 1:42.58 OR

Medalists
1st place, gold medalist(s)		Vebjørn Rodal; Norway
2nd place, silver medalist(s)		Hezekiél Sepeng; South Africa
3rd place, bronze medalist(s)		Fred Onyancha; Kenya

The men's 800 metres event at the 1996 Summer Olympics in Atlanta was held between 28 and 31 July 1996. There were a total of 60 competitors from 42 countries. The maximum number of athletes per nation had been set at 3 since the 1930 Olympic Congress. The event was won by 0.16 seconds by Vebjørn Rodal of Norway, the nation's first title in the men's 800 metres and first medal in the event since 1956. Hezekiél Sepeng's silver was South Africa's first 800 metres medal since 1920.

== Background ==
This was the 23rd appearance of the event, which is one of 12 athletics events to have been held at every Summer Olympics. Four finalists from 1992 returned: bronze medalist Johnny Gray of the United States (also a finalist in 1984 and 1988), fourth-place finisher José Luíz Barbosa of Brazil (a 1988 finalist as well), fifth-place finisher Andrea Benvenuti of Italy, and sixth-place finisher Curtis Robb of Great Britain. Wilson Kipketer was the strongest 800 metres runner in 1996, having won the first of his three world championship titles in 1995; however, he was ruled ineligible for the Games during the process of changing his nationality from Kenya to Denmark. Without Kipketer, the field was open with no clear favorite.

Burundi, the Czech Republic, Dominica, Guinea-Bissau, Kyrgyzstan, and Latvia appeared in the event for the first time. Great Britain made its 22nd appearance, most among all nations, having had no competitors in the event only in the 1904 Games in St. Louis.

== Competition format ==
The men's 800 metres again used a three-round format, the most common format since 1912 though there had been variations. The "fastest loser" system introduced in 1964 was used for the first two rounds. There were eight first-round heats, each with 7 or 8 athletes; the top two runners in each heat as well as the next eight fastest overall advanced to the semifinals. There were three semifinals with 8 athletes each; the top two runners in each semifinal and the next two fastest overall advanced to the eight-man final.

== Records ==
Prior to the competition, the existing World and Olympic records were as follows.

World record	Sebastian Coe (GBR)	1:41.73	Florence, Italy	10 June 1981
Olympic record	Joaquim Cruz (BRA)	1:43.00	Los Angeles, United States	6 August 1984

In the final Vebjørn Rodal set a new Olympic record at 1:42.58.

== Schedule ==
All times are Eastern Daylight Time (UTC−4)

Date	Time	Round
Sunday, 28 July 1996	19:15	Round 1
Monday, 29 July 1996	18:50	Semifinals
Wednesday, 31 July 1996	20:35	Final

== Results ==
=== Round 1 ===
==== Heat 1 ====
Rank	Athlete	Nation	Time	Notes
1	Vebjørn Rodal	Norway	1:45.30	Q
2	Curtis Robb	Great Britain	1:45.85	Q
3	José Luíz Barbosa	Brazil	1:46.58	q
4	David Matthews	Ireland	1:46.76	q
5	Joachim Dehmel	Germany	1:47.12	
6	Joseph Rakotoarimanana	Madagascar	1:47.33	
7	Tommy Asinga	Suriname	1:48.29	

==== Heat 2 ====
Rank	Athlete	Nation	Time	Notes
1	Philip Kibitok	Kenya	1:45.34	Q
2	Nico Motchebon	Germany	1:45.82	Q
3	Bruno Konczylo	France	1:46.04	q
4	Adem Hecini	Algeria	1:47.23	
5	Abdul Rahman Al-Abdullah	Qatar	1:48.52	
6	Flavio Godoy	Brazil	1:48.91	
7	Chérif Baba Aidara	Mauritania	1:56.20	

==== Heat 3 ====
Rank	Athlete	Nation	Time	Notes
1	Norberto Téllez	Cuba	1:47.24	Q
2	Craig Winrow	Great Britain	1:47.41	Q
3	Pavel Soukup	Czech Republic	1:47.67	
4	Andrés Manuel Díaz	Spain	1:47.86	
5	Atle Douglas	Norway	1:48.60	
6	Cedric Harris	Dominica	1:51.46	
7	Fernando Arlete	Guinea-Bissau	2:00.07	

==== Heat 4 ====
Rank	Athlete	Nation	Time	Notes
1	David Kiptoo	Kenya	1:45.11	Q
2	Giuseppe D'Urso	Italy	1:45.27	Q
3	Johan Botha	South Africa	1:45.63	q
4	Jimmy Jean-Joseph	France	1:45.64	q
5	Ibrahim Aden	Somalia	1:47.31	
6	Charles Nkazamyampi	Burundi	1:47.95	
7	Tavakalo Kailes	Vanuatu	1:55.07	
8	Naseer Ismail	Maldives	1:58.70	

==== Heat 5 ====
Rank	Athlete	Nation	Time	Notes
1	Johnny Gray	United States	1:45.87	Q
2	Einārs Tupurītis	Latvia	1:45.88	Q
3	Savieri Ngidhi	Zimbabwe	1:46.46	q
4	Balázs Korányi	Hungary	1:46.63	q
5	Antonio Abrantes	Portugal	1:47.73	
6	Clive Terrelonge	Jamaica	1:48.29	
7	Themba Makhanya	Swaziland	1:59.02	

==== Heat 6 ====
Rank	Athlete	Nation	Time	Notes
1	Arthémon Hatungimana	Burundi	1:47.10	Q
2	Andrea Benvenuti	Italy	1:47.45	Q
3	Marius van Heerden	South Africa	1:47.46	
4	David Maxwell Strang	Great Britain	1:47.96	
5	Boris Kaveshnikov	Kyrgyzstan	1:48.88	
6	José Parrilla	United States	1:49.99	
7	Yaya Terap Adoum	Chad	1:52.68	

==== Heat 7 ====
Rank	Athlete	Nation	Time	Notes
1	Benyounes Lahlou	Morocco	1:45.85	Q
2	Fred Onyancha	Kenya	1:46.07	Q
3	Paul Byrne	Australia	1:47.05	q
4	Alex Morgan	Jamaica	1:47.40	
5	Mohamed Babiker Yagoub	Sudan	1:48.50	
6	Manlio Molinari	San Marino	1:56.08	
—	Roberto Parra	Spain	DNS	

==== Heat 8 ====
Rank	Athlete	Nation	Time	Notes
1	Hezekiél Sepeng	South Africa	1:45.45	Q
2	André Bucher	Switzerland	1:46.85	Q
3	Andrea Giocondi	Italy	1:47.26	
4	Brandon Rock	United States	1:48.47	
5	Jean Destine	Haiti	1:48.82	
6	Saeed Basweidan	Yemen	1:49.35	
7	Greg Rhymer	British Virgin Islands	1:50.03	

==== Overall results for round 1 ====
Rank		Heat	Athlete	Nation	Time	Notes
Overall	In heat	Heat	Athlete	Nation	Time	Notes
1	1	4	David Kiptoo	Kenya	1:45.11	Q
2	2	4	Giuseppe D'Urso	Italy	1:45.27	Q
3	1	1	Vebjørn Rodal	Norway	1:45.30	Q
4	1	2	Philip Kibitok	Kenya	1:45.34	Q
5	3	4	Johan Botha	South Africa	1:45.63	q
6	4	4	Jimmy Jean-Joseph	France	1:45.64	q
7	2	2	Nico Motchebon	Germany	1:45.82	Q
8	1	7	Benyounes Lahlou	Morocco	1:45.85	Q
8	2	1	Curtis Robb	Great Britain	1:45.85	Q
10	1	5	Johnny Gray	United States	1:45.87	Q
11	2	5	Einārs Tupurītis	Latvia	1:45.88	Q
12	3	2	Bruno Konczylo	France	1:46.04	q
13	2	7	Fred Onyancha	Kenya	1:46.07	Q
14	1	8	Hezekiél Sepeng	South Africa	1:45.45	Q
15	3	5	Savieri Ngidhi	Zimbabwe	1:46.46	q
16	3	1	José Luíz Barbosa	Brazil	1:46.58	q
17	4	5	Balázs Korányi	Hungary	1:46.63	q
18	4	1	David Matthews	Ireland	1:46.76	q
19	2	8	André Bucher	Switzerland	1:46.85	Q
20	3	7	Paul Byrne	Australia	1:47.05	q
21	1	6	Arthémon Hatungimana	Burundi	1:47.10	Q
22	5	1	Joachim Dehmel	Germany	1:47.12	
23	4	2	Adem Hecini	Algeria	1:47.23	
24	1	3	Norberto Téllez	Cuba	1:47.24	Q
25	3	8	Andrea Giocondi	Italy	1:47.26	
26	5	4	Ibrahim Aden	Somalia	1:47.31	
27	6	1	Joseph Rakotoarimanana	Madagascar	1:47.33	
28	4	7	Alex Morgan	Jamaica	1:47.40	
29	2	3	Craig Winrow	Great Britain	1:47.41	Q
30	2	6	Andrea Benvenuti	Italy	1:47.45	Q
31	3	6	Marius van Heerden	South Africa	1:47.46	
32	3	3	Pavel Soukup	Czech Republic	1:47.67	
33	5	5	Antonio Abrantes	Portugal	1:47.73	
34	4	3	Andrés Manuel Díaz	Spain	1:47.86	
35	6	4	Charles Nkazamyampi	Burundi	1:47.95	
36	4	6	David Maxwell Strang	Great Britain	1:47.96	
37	7	1	Tommy Asinga	Suriname	1:48.29	
37	6	5	Clive Terrelonge	Jamaica	1:48.29	
39	4	8	Brandon Rock	United States	1:48.47	
40	5	7	Mohamed Babiker Yagoub	Sudan	1:48.50	
41	5	2	Abdul Rahman Al-Abdullah	Qatar	1:48.52	
42	5	3	Atle Douglas	Norway	1:48.60	
43	5	8	Jean Destine	Haiti	1:48.82	
44	5	6	Boris Kaveshnikov	Kyrgyzstan	1:48.88	
45	6	2	Flavio Godoy	Brazil	1:48.91	
46	6	8	Saeed Basweidan	Yemen	1:49.35	
47	6	6	José Parrilla	United States	1:49.99	
48	7	8	Greg Rhymer	British Virgin Islands	1:50.03	
49	6	3	Cedric Harris	Dominica	1:51.46	
50	7	6	Yaya Terap Adoum	Chad	1:52.68	
51	7	4	Tavakalo Kailes	Vanuatu	1:55.07	
52	7	2	Chérif Baba Aidara	Mauritania	1:56.20	
53	8	4	Naseer Ismail	Maldives	1:58.70	
54	7	5	Themba Makhanya	Swaziland	1:59.02	
55	7	3	Fernando Arlete	Guinea-Bissau	2:00.07	
56	6	7	Manlio Molinari	San Marino	1:56.08	
—	—	7	Roberto Parra	Spain	DNS	

=== Semifinals ===
==== Semifinal 1 ====
Rank	Athlete	Nation	Time	Notes
1	Hezekiél Sepeng	South Africa	1:45.16	Q
2	Nico Motchebon	Germany	1:45.40	Q
3	Philip Kibitok	Kenya	1:45.58	
4	André Bucher	Switzerland	1:46.41	
5	Giuseppe D'Urso	Italy	1:46.97	
6	Paul Byrne	Australia	1:47.58	
7	Bruno Konczylo	France	1:48.02	
8	Craig Winrow	Great Britain	1:48.57	

==== Semifinal 2 ====
Rank	Athlete	Nation	Time	Notes
1	Benyounes Lahlou	Morocco	1:43.99	Q
2	Johnny Gray	United States	1:44.00	Q
3	Fred Onyancha	Kenya	1:44.02	q
4	Arthémon Hatungimana	Burundi	1:44.92	
5	Savieri Ngidhi	Zimbabwe	1:46.78	
6	Curtis Robb	Great Britain	1:47.48	
7	Johan Botha	South Africa	1:48.06	
8	José Luíz Barbosa	Brazil	1:50.33	

==== Semifinal 3 ====
Rank	Athlete	Nation	Time	Notes
1	Norberto Téllez	Cuba	1:43.79	Q
2	David Kiptoo	Kenya	1:43.90	Q
3	Vebjørn Rodal	Norway	1:43.96	q
4	Einārs Tupurītis	Latvia	1:46.41	
5	David Matthews	Ireland	1:47.83	
6	Jimmy Jean-Joseph	France	1:48.50	
7	Balázs Korányi	Hungary	1:50.30	
—	Andrea Benvenuti	Italy	DNF	

==== Overall results for semifinals ====
Rank		Heat	Athlete	Nation	Time	Notes
Overall	In heat	Heat	Athlete	Nation	Time	Notes
1	1	3	Norberto Téllez	Cuba	1:43.79	Q
2	2	3	David Kiptoo	Kenya	1:43.90	Q
3	3	3	Vebjørn Rodal	Norway	1:43.96	q
4	1	2	Benyounes Lahlou	Morocco	1:43.99	Q
5	2	2	Johnny Gray	United States	1:44.00	Q
6	3	2	Fred Onyancha	Kenya	1:44.02	q
7	4	2	Arthémon Hatungimana	Burundi	1:44.92	
8	1	1	Hezekiél Sepeng	South Africa	1:45.16	Q
9	2	1	Nico Motchebon	Germany	1:45.40	Q
10	3	1	Philip Kibitok	Kenya	1:45.58	
11	4	1	André Bucher	Switzerland	1:46.41	
11	4	3	Einārs Tupurītis	Latvia	1:46.41	
13	5	2	Savieri Ngidhi	Zimbabwe	1:46.78	
14	5	1	Giuseppe D'Urso	Italy	1:46.97	
15	6	2	Curtis Robb	Great Britain	1:47.48	
16	6	1	Paul Byrne	Australia	1:47.58	
17	5	3	David Matthews	Ireland	1:47.83	
18	7	1	Bruno Konczylo	France	1:48.02	
19	7	2	Johan Botha	South Africa	1:48.06	
20	6	3	Jimmy Jean-Joseph	France	1:48.50	
21	8	1	Craig Winrow	Great Britain	1:48.57	
22	7	3	Balázs Korányi	Hungary	1:50.30	
23	8	2	José Luíz Barbosa	Brazil	1:50.33	
—	—	3	Andrea Benvenuti	Italy	DNF	

=== Final ===
Rank	Lane	Athlete	Nation	Time	Notes
1st place, gold medalist(s)	1	Vebjørn Rodal	Norway	1:42.58	OR
2nd place, silver medalist(s)	6	Hezekiél Sepeng	South Africa	1:42.74	
3rd place, bronze medalist(s)	7	Fred Onyancha	Kenya	1:42.79	
4	4	Norberto Téllez	Cuba	1:42.85	
5	8	Nico Motchebon	Germany	1:43.91	
6	5	David Kiptoo	Kenya	1:44.19	
7	2	Johnny Gray	United States	1:44.21	
8	3	Benyounes Lahlou	Morocco	1:45.52	

== See also ==
- Women's 800 metres
