= Kenya at the 1996 Summer Olympics =

- IOC code: KEN
- NOC: National Olympic Committee of Kenya
- Website: teamkenya.or.ke

in Atlanta
- Competitors: 52 in 5 sports
- Flag bearer: Paul Tergat
- Medals Ranked 38th: Gold 1 Silver 4 Bronze 3 Total 8

Summer Olympics appearances (overview)
- 1956; 1960; 1964; 1968; 1972; 1976–1980; 1984; 1988; 1992; 1996; 2000; 2004; 2008; 2012; 2016; 2020; 2024

Kenya competed at the 1996 Summer Olympics in Atlanta, United States, from 19 July to 4 August 1996.

== Medalists ==
Medal	Name	Sport	Event	Date
Gold	Joseph Keter	Athletics	Men's 3000 m steeplechase	2 August
Silver	Pauline Konga	Athletics	Women's 5000 m	28 July
Silver	Paul Tergat	Athletics	Men's 10,000 m	29 July
Silver	Moses Kiptanui	Athletics	Men's 3000 m steeplechase	2 August
Silver	Paul Bitok	Athletics	Men's 5000 m	3 August
Bronze	Fred Onyancha	Athletics	Men's 800 m	31 July
Bronze	Stephen Kipkorir	Athletics	Men's 1500 m	3 August
Bronze	Erick Wainaina	Athletics	Men's marathon	4 August

== Competitors ==
The following is the list of number of competitors in the Games.

Sport	Men	Women	Total
Archery	1	1	2
Athletics	34	9	43
Boxing	5	–	5
Shooting	1	0	1
Weightlifting	1	–	1
Total	42	10	52

== Results and competitors by event ==
=== Archery ===
Men

Athlete	Event	Ranking round		Round of 64	Round of 32	Round of 16	Quarterfinals	Semifinals	Final	
Athlete	Event	Score	Seed	Opposition Score	Opposition Score	Opposition Score	Opposition Score	Opposition Score	Opposition Score	Rank
Dominic Rebelo	Individual	518	64	Michele Frangilli (ITA); L 142-166	Did not advance					

Women

Athlete	Event	Ranking round		Round of 64	Round of 32	Round of 16	Quarterfinals	Semifinals	Final	
Athlete	Event	Score	Seed	Opposition Score	Opposition Score	Opposition Score	Opposition Score	Opposition Score	Opposition Score	Rank
Jennifer Mbuta	Individual	500	64	Lina Herasymenko (UKR); L 126-156	Did not advance					

=== Athletics ===
==== Men ====
Track and road events

Athletes	Events	Heat Round 1		Heat Round 2		Semifinal		Final	
Athletes	Events	Time	Rank	Time	Rank	Time	Rank	Time	Rank
Donald Onchiri	100 metres	10.66	74	Did not advance					
Joseph Gikonyo	200 metres	20.88	53	Did not advance					
Charles Gitonga	400 metres	45.62	15 q	Did not start		Did not advance			
Samson Kitur	400 metres	45.39	6 Q	45.03	10 Q	45.17	9	Did not advance	
Kennedy Ochieng	400 metres	45.99	26 q	45.72	24	Did not advance			
Philip Kibitok	800 metres	1:45.34	4 Q	N/A		1:45.58	10	Did not advance	
David Kiptoo	800 metres	1:45.11	1 Q	N/A		1:43.90	2 Q	1:44.19	6
Fred Onyancha	800 metres	1:46.07	13 Q	N/A		1:44.02	6 q	1:42.79	Bronze medal
Stephen Kipkorir	1500 metres	3:36.70	4 Q	N/A		3:35.29	8 Q	3:36.72	Bronze medal
Laban Rotich	1500 metres	3:35.88	1 Q	N/A		3:33.73	5 Q	3:37.39	4
William Tanui	1500 metres	3:37.72	11 Q	N/A		3:33.57	4 Q	3:37.42	5
Paul Bitok	5000 metres	13:54.45	12 Q	N/A		13:27.61	2 Q	13:08.16	Silver medal
Shem Kororia	5000 metres	14:02.75	22 Q	N/A		13:27.50	1 Q	13:14.63	9
Tom Nyariki	5000 metres	13:51.47	3 Q	N/A		14:03.21	10 Q	13:12.29	5
Paul Koech	10000 metres	28:17.48	13 Q	N/A				27:35.19	6
Josphat Machuka	10000 metres	28:14.27	12 Q	N/A				27:35.08	5
Paul Tergat	10000 metres	27:50.66	2 Q	N/A				27:08.17	Silver medal
Lameck Aguta	Marathon	N/A						2:22:04	52
Ezequiel Bitok	Marathon	N/A						2:23:03	56
Erick Wainaina	Marathon	N/A						2:12:44	Bronze medal
Gideon Biwott	400 metres hurdles	49.74	29	N/A		Did not advance			
Erick Keter	400 metres hurdles	49.03	18	N/A		Did not advance			
Barnabas Kinyor	400 metres hurdles	49.82	31	N/A		Did not advance			
Matthew Birir	3000 metres steeplechase	8:27.09	2 Q	N/A		8:27.16	9 Q	8:17.18	4
Joseph Keter	3000 metres steeplechase	8:30.23	7 Q	N/A		8:18.90	1 Q	8:07.12	Gold medal
Moses Kiptanui	3000 metres steeplechase	8:30.87	10 Q	N/A		8:18.91	2 Q	8:08.33	Silver medal
Julius Chepkwony; Simon Kemboi; Samson Kitur; Kennedy Ochieng; Samson Yego	4 x 400 metres relay	3:02.52	5 Q	N/A		3:01.73	5 Q	Did not start	
Justus Kavulanya	20 kilometres walk	N/A						1:27:49	40
David Kimutai	20 kilometres walk	N/A						1:25:01	23
Julius Sawe	20 kilometres walk	N/A						Disqualified	

Field events

Athlete	Event	Qualification		Final	
Athlete	Event	Result	Rank	Result	Rank
Remmy Limo	Long jump	7.46	37	Did not advance	
Jacob Katonon	Triple jump	16.17	28	Did not advance	

==== Women ====
Track and road events

Athletes	Events	Heat Round 1		Heat Round 2		Semifinal		Final	
Athletes	Events	Time	Rank	Time	Rank	Time	Rank	Time	Rank
Naomi Mugo	1500 metres	4:13.35	18 Q	N/A		4:20.01	22	Did not advance	
Lydia Cheromei	5000 metres	15:49.85	27	N/A				Did not advance	
Rose Cheruiyot	5000 metres	15:26.87	15 q	N/A				15:17.33	8
Pauline Konga	5000 metres	15:07.01	1 Q	N/A				15:03.49	Silver medal
Sally Barsosio	10000 metres	31:36.00	2 Q	N/A				31:53.38	10
Tegla Loroupe	10000 metres	32:28.73	16 Q	N/A				31:23.22	6
Joyce Chepchumba	Marathon	N/A						Did not finish	
Selina Chirchir	Marathon	N/A						Did not finish	
Angeline Kanana	Marathon	N/A						2:34:19	15

=== Boxing ===
Athlete	Event	Round of 32	Round of 16	Quarterfinal	Semifinal	Final
Athlete	Event	Opposition Result	Opposition Result	Opposition Result	Opposition Result	Opposition Result
George Maina Kinianjui	Lightweight	Shin (KOR); L RSC	Did not advance			
Peter Bulinga	Light-welterweight	Allalou (ALG); L 17-3	Did not advance			
Evans Ashira	Welterweight	Atayev (UZB); L 15-10	Did not advance			
Peter Odhiambo	Light-heavyweight	Mbongo (CMR); L 15-6	Did not advance			
Ahmed Rajab Omari	Heavyweight	bye	Defiagbon (CAN); L 15-4	Did not advance		

=== Shooting ===
Men

Athlete	Events	Qualification		Final		Rank
Athlete	Events	Score	Rank	Score	Rank	Rank
Anuj Desai	50 metre rifle prone	586	49	Did not advance		49

=== Weightlifting ===
Athletes	Events	Snatch		Clean & Jerk		Total	Rank
Athletes	Events	Result	Rank	Result	Rank	Total	Rank
Collins Okothnyawallo	-99 kg	125	25	150	25	275	25
