= Guinea-Bissau at the 2004 Summer Olympics =

- IOC code: GBS
- NOC: Guinea-Bissau Olympic Committee
- Website: cogb.gw

in Athens
- Competitors: 3 in 2 sports
- Flag bearer: Leopoldina Ross
- Medals: Gold 0 Silver 0 Bronze 0 Total 0

Summer Olympics appearances (overview)
- 1996; 2000; 2004; 2008; 2012; 2016; 2020; 2024

Guinea-Bissau competed at the 2004 Summer Olympics in Athens, Greece, from 13 to 29 August 2004.

== Athletics ==
Bissauan athletes have so far achieved qualifying standards in the following athletics events (up to a maximum of 3 athletes in each event at the 'A' Standard, and 1 at the 'B' Standard).

Key

- Note–Ranks given for track events are within the athlete's heat only
- Q = Qualified for the next round
- q = Qualified for the next round as a fastest loser or, in field events, by position without achieving the qualifying target
- NR = National record
- N/A = Round not applicable for the event
- Bye = Athlete not required to compete in round

Men

Athlete	Event	Heat		Semifinal		Final	
Athlete	Event	Result	Rank	Result	Rank	Result	Rank
Danilson Ricciuli	400 m	49.27	8	did not advance			

Women

Athlete	Event	Heat		Semifinal		Final	
Athlete	Event	Result	Rank	Result	Rank	Result	Rank
Anhel Cape	800 m	DNF		did not advance			

== Wrestling ==
Key

- VT - Victory by Fall.
- PP - Decision by Points - the loser with technical points.
- PO - Decision by Points - the loser without technical points.

Women's freestyle

Athlete	Event	Elimination Pool			Classification	Semifinal	Final / BM	
Athlete	Event	Opposition Result	Opposition Result	Rank	Opposition Result	Opposition Result	Opposition Result	Rank
Leopoldina Ross	−48 kg	Berthenet (FRA); L 0–5 ^{VT}	Enkhjargal (MGL); L 0–4 ^{ST}	3	did not advance			13
