= 1999 IAAF World Indoor Championships – Men's 800 metres =

The men's 800 metres event at the 1999 IAAF World Indoor Championships was held on March 5–7.

== Medalists ==
Gold	Silver	Bronze
Johan Botha; South Africa	Wilson Kipketer; Denmark	Nico Motchebon; Germany

== Results ==
=== Heats ===
First 2 of each heat (Q) and next 8 fastest (q) qualified for the semifinals.

Rank	Heat	Name	Nationality	Time	Notes
1	1	Wilson Kipketer	Denmark	1:48.00	Q
2	5	Johan Botha	South Africa	1:48.07	Q
3	5	Balázs Korányi	Hungary	1:48.10	Q
4	5	Kennedy Kimwetich	Kenya	1:48.13	q
5	2	Jean-Patrick Nduwimana	Burundi	1:48.31	Q
6	5	Lukáš Vydra	Czech Republic	1:48.32	q, SB
7	2	Nico Motchebon	Germany	1:48.33	Q
8	1	Arthémon Hatungimana	Burundi	1:48.34	Q
9	1	James Nolan	Ireland	1:48.46	q
10	2	David Kiptoo	Kenya	1:48.61	q
11	1	Khadevis Robinson	United States	1:48.68	q, PB
12	5	Andrea Giocondi	Italy	1:49.03	q
13	2	Savieri Ngidhi	Zimbabwe	1:49.08	q
14	1	Glody Dube	Botswana	1:49.11	q
15	4	Andrea Longo	Italy	1:49.29	Q
16	4	Tarik Bourrouag	Germany	1:49.38	Q
17	4	Andrew Hart	Great Britain	1:49.64	
18	4	David Matthews	Ireland	1:49.81	
19	4	Jean-Marc Destine	Haiti	1:50.37	
20	2	Manabu Isshi	Japan	1:50.94	
21	3	Wojciech Kałdowski	Poland	1:52.26	Q
22	3	Norberto Téllez	Cuba	1:52.38	Q
23	3	André Bucher	Switzerland	1:52.43	
24	3	Shaun Farrell	New Zealand	1:52.48	
25	3	Ian Roberts	Guyana	1:53.09	
26	2	Naseer Ismail	Maldives	1:58.17	

=== Semifinals ===
First 2 of each semifinal qualified directly (Q) for the final.

Rank	Heat	Name	Nationality	Time	Notes
1	2	Johan Botha	South Africa	1:46.65	Q
2	2	Wilson Kipketer	Denmark	1:46.76	Q
3	2	Jean-Patrick Nduwimana	Burundi	1:46.80	PB
4	1	Nico Motchebon	Germany	1:47.05	Q
5	2	Andrea Giocondi	Italy	1:47.45	SB
6	1	James Nolan	Ireland	1:47.54	Q
7	1	Wojciech Kałdowski	Poland	1:47.58	
8	1	Arthémon Hatungimana	Burundi	1:48.17	
9	2	David Kiptoo	Kenya	1:48.35	
10	1	Andrea Longo	Italy	1:48.61	
11	3	Balázs Korányi	Hungary	1:48.74	Q
12	3	Savieri Ngidhi	Zimbabwe	1:48.85	Q
13	3	Tarik Bourrouag	Germany	1:48.88	
14	2	Lukáš Vydra	Czech Republic	1:49.18	
15	3	Khadevis Robinson	United States	1:49.38	
16	3	Glody Dube	Botswana	1:49.57	
17	3	Kennedy Kimwetich	Kenya	1:50.18	
	1	Norberto Téllez	Cuba	DNF	

=== Final ===
Rank	Name	Nationality	Time	Notes
1st place, gold medalist(s)	Johan Botha	South Africa	1:45.47	
2nd place, silver medalist(s)	Wilson Kipketer	Denmark	1:45.49	
3rd place, bronze medalist(s)	Nico Motchebon	Germany	1:45.74	
4	Balázs Korányi	Hungary	1:46.47	NR
5	James Nolan	Ireland	1:47.77	
6	Savieri Ngidhi	Zimbabwe	1:47.79	
