= 1000 metres =

Running race

Athletics 1000 metres

World records
- Men: Emmanuel Wanyonyi (KEN) 2:11.83 (2026)
- Women: Svetlana Masterkova (RUS) 2:28.98 (1996)

Short track world records
- Men: Ayanleh Souleiman (DJI) 2:14.20 (2016)
- Women: Maria Mutola (MOZ) 2:30.94 (1999)

World junior (U20) records
- Men: Niels Laros (NED) 2:14.37 (2024)
- Women: Audrey Werro (SUI) 2:34.89 (2023)

The 1000 metres, 1 kilometre run, or 1K run is an uncommon middle-distance running event in track and field competitions. It consists of two and a half laps around an outdoor 400 m track, or five laps around an indoor 200 m track.

The 1000 yards, an imperial alternative (914.4 m), was sometimes also contested.

== Records ==
=== World records ===
- Correct as of 10 July 2026.

Division	Time	Athlete	Nation	Date	Place
Men	2:11.83	Emmanuel Wanyonyi	Kenya	10 July 2026	Monaco
Women	2:28.98	Svetlana Masterkova	Russia	23 August 1996	Brussels

=== Short track world records ===
- Correct as of 7 May 2026.

Division	Time	Athlete	Nation	Date	Place
Men	2:14.20	Ayanleh Souleiman	Djibouti	17 February 2016	Stockholm
Women	2:30.94	Maria Mutola	Mozambique	15 February 1999	Stockholm

=== Area records ===
- Updated 4 August 2026.

Area	Men			Women		
Area	Time	Season	Athlete	Time	Season	Athlete
Africa (records)	2:11.83 WR	2026	Emmanuel Wanyonyi (KEN)	2:29.15	2020	Faith Kipyegon (KEN)
Asia (records)	2:14.72	2008	Yusuf Saad Kamel (BHR)	2:35.30	2018	Nelly Jepkosgei (BHR)
Europe (records)	2:12.18	1981	Sebastian Coe (GBR)	2:28.98 WR	1996	Svetlana Masterkova (RUS)
North, Central America and Caribbean (records)	2:13.13	2024	Marco Arop (CAN)	2:30.71	2025	Addison Wiley (USA)
Oceania (records)	2:15.13	2026	Peter Bol (AUS)	2:30.96	2025	Jessica Hull (AUS)
South America (records)	2:14.09	1984	Joaquim Cruz (BRA)	2:32.25	1991	Letitia Vriesde (SUR)

== All-time top 25 ==
Tables show data for two definitions of "Top 25" – the top 25 1000 m times and the top 25 athletes:
– denotes top performance for athletes in the top 25 1000 m times
– denotes lesser performances, still in the top 25 1000 m times, by repeat athletes
– denotes top performance (only) for other top 25 athletes who fall outside the top 25 1000 m times

=== Men (outdoor) ===
- Correct as of July 2026.

Ath.#	Perf.#	Time	Athlete	Nation	Date	Place	Ref.
1	1	2:11.83	Emmanuel Wanyonyi	Kenya	10 July 2026	Monaco	
2	2	2:11.96	Noah Ngeny	Kenya	5 September 1999	Rieti	
3	3	2:12.18	Sebastian Coe	Great Britain	11 July 1981	Oslo	
4	4	2:12.25	Mohamed Attaoui	Spain	2 September 2025	Trier	
	5	2:12.66	Ngeny #2		17 July 1999	Nice	
5	6	2:12.77	Jake Wightman	Great Britain	10 July 2026	Monaco	
6	7	2:12.88	Steve Cram	Great Britain	9 August 1985	Gateshead	
7	8	2:12.96	Festus Lagat	Kenya	2 September 2025	Trier	
8	9	2:13.08	Taoufik Makhloufi	Algeria	1 July 2015	Nancy	
9	10	2:13.13	Marco Arop	Canada	8 September 2024	Zagreb	
	11	2:13.40	Coe #2		1 July 1980	Oslo	
10	12	2:13.49	Ayanleh Souleiman	Djibouti	25 August 2016	Lausanne	
11	13	2:13.56	Kennedy Kimwetich	Kenya	17 July 1999	Nice	
12	14	2:13.62	Abubaker Kaki Khamis	Sudan	3 July 2010	Eugene	
13	15	2:13.73	Noureddine Morceli	Algeria	2 July 1993	Villeneuve-d'Ascq	
	16	2:13.88	Wightman #2		10 August 2022	Monaco	
14	17	2:13.89	Robert Biwott	Kenya	25 August 2016	Lausanne	
15	18	2:13.9 h	Rick Wohlhuter	United States	30 July 1974	Oslo	
	19	2:13.93	Kaki #2		22 July 2008	Stockholm	
16	20	2:13.94	Djamel Sedjati	Algeria	10 July 2026	Monaco	
17	21	2:13.95	Jonathan Kitilit	Kenya	25 August 2016	Lausanne	
18	22	2:13.96	Mehdi Baala	France	26 June 2003	Strasbourg	
	23	2:13.97	Sedjati #2		5 March 2024	Potchefstroom	
19	24	2:14.02	Azeddine Habz	France	10 July 2026	Monaco	
20	25	2:14.09	Joaquim Cruz	Brazil	20 August 1984	Nice	
21		2:14.11	Ben Pattison	Great Britain	10 July 2026	Monaco	
22		2:14.23	Asbel Kiprop	Kenya	25 August 2016	Lausanne	
23		2:14.28	Japheth Kimutai	Kenya	1 August 2000	Stockholm	
24		2:14.30	Marcin Lewandowski	Poland	25 August 2016	Lausanne	
25		2:14.37	Niels Laros	Netherlands	7 July 2024	Hengelo	

=== Men (indoor) ===
- Correct as of February 2026.

Ath.#	Perf.#	Time	Athlete	Nation	Date	Place	Ref.
1	1	2:14.20	Ayanleh Souleiman	Djibouti	17 February 2016	Stockholm	
2	2	2:14.48	Josh Hoey	United States	18 January 2025	Philadelphia	
3	3	2:14.52	Mohamed Attaoui	Spain	6 February 2026	Madrid	
4	4	2:14.74	Marco Arop	Canada	4 February 2024	Boston	
5	5	2:14.96	Wilson Kipketer	Denmark	20 February 2000	Birmingham	
	6	2:15.25	Kipketer #2		6 February 2000	Stuttgart	
6	7	2:15.26	Noureddine Morceli	Algeria	22 February 1992	Birmingham	
7	8	2:15.50	Kennedy Kimwetich	Kenya	6 February 2000	Stuttgart	
8	9	2:15.62	Vénuste Niyongabo	Burundi	27 February 1995	Stockholm	
9	10	2:15.77	Abubaker Kaki Khamis	Sudan	21 February 2008	Stockholm	
10	11	2:15.96	Ilham Tanui Özbilen	Turkey	20 February 2014	Istanbul	
11	12	2:16.09	Samuel Chapple	Netherlands	15 February 2025	Birmingham	
	13	2:16.15	Kaki #2		24 February 2008	Ghent	
12	14	2:16.16	Shane Streich	United States	12 February 2022	Louisville	
	15	2:16.23	Kaki #3		7 February 2009	Stuttgart	
13	16	2:16.25	Mariano García	Spain	25 January 2025	Antequera	
14	17	2:16.27	Bryce Hoppel	United States	13 February 2021	New York	
15	18	2:16.30	Cole Hocker	United States	7 February 2026	Blacksburg	
16	19	2:16.4 h	Rob Druppers	Netherlands	20 February 1988	The Hague	
	19	2:16.40	García #2		6 February 2026	Madrid	
	21	2:16.47	Kipketer #3		17 February 2000	Stockholm	
17	22	2:16.67	Benjamin Allen	United States	23 February 2024	New York	
18	23	2:16.71	Johan Botha	South Africa	3 February 1999	Erfurt	
19	24	2:16.74	Luciano Fiore	United States	14 February 2025	Boston	
19	24	2:16.74	Neil Gourley	Great Britain	15 February 2025	Birmingham	
21		2:16.76	Haron Keitany	Kenya	1 February 2009	Moscow	
21		2:16.76	David Torrence	United States	2 March 2014	Boston	
23		2:16.84	Tinoda Matsatsa	United States	18 January 2025	State College	
24		2:16.87	Nathan Brannen	Canada	2 March 2014	Boston	
25		2:16.95	Jack Anstey	Australia	10 February 2024	Boston	

=== Women (outdoor) ===
- Correct as of July 2025.

Ath.#	Perf.#	Time	Athlete	Nation	Date	Place	Ref.
1	1	2:28.98	Svetlana Masterkova	Russia	23 August 1996	Brussels	
2	2	2:29.15	Faith Kipyegon	Kenya	14 August 2020	Monaco	
	3	2:29.21	Kipyegon #2		26 April 2025	Xiamen	
3	4	2:29.34	Maria Mutola	Mozambique	25 August 1995	Brussels	
	5	2:29.66	Mutola #2		23 August 1996	Brussels	
4	6	2:29.77	Nelly Chepchirchir	Kenya	11 July 2025	Monaco	
	7	2:29.92	Kipyegon #3		4 September 2020	Brussels	
	8	2:30.12	Mutola #3		30 August 2002	Brussels	
5	9	2:30.6 h	Tatyana Providokhina	Soviet Union	20 August 1978	Podolsk	
6	10	2:30.67	Christine Wachtel	East Germany	17 August 1990	Berlin	
7	11	2:30.70	Caster Semenya	South Africa	2 September 2018	Berlin	
8	12	2:30.71	Addison Wiley	United States	11 July 2025	Monaco	
	13	2:30.72	Mutola #4		10 July 1995	Stockholm	
9	14	2:30.82	Laura Muir	Great Britain	14 August 2020	Monaco	
10	15	2:30.85	Martina Steuk	East Germany	9 July 1980	Berlin	
11	16	2:30.96	Jessica Hull	Australia	11 July 2025	Monaco	
	17	2:31.01	Semenya #2		13 July 2018	Rabat	
12	18	2:31.06	Ciara Mageean	Ireland	14 August 2020	Monaco	
13	19	2:31.11	Jemma Reekie	Great Britain	14 August 2020	Monaco	
	20	2:31.18	Masterkova #2		17 July 1999	Nice	
	21	2:31.24	Chepchirchir #2		25 August 2024	Chorzów	
14	22	2:31.30	Sinclaire Johnson	United States	11 July 2025	Monaco	
	23	2:31.44	Reekie #2		11 July 2025	Monaco	
	24	2:31.49	Wiley #2		31 August 2024	Białystok	
15	25	2:31.5 h A	Maricica Puică	Romania	1 June 1986	Poiana Brasov	
15	25	2:31.50	Natalya Artyomova	Soviet Union	10 September 1991	Berlin	
17		2:31.51	Sandra Gasser	Switzerland	13 September 1989	Jerez de la Frontera	
18		2:31.6 h	Beate Liebich	East Germany	9 July 1980	Berlin	
19		2:31.65	Olga Dvirna	Soviet Union	1 September 1982	Athens	
20		2:31.66	Jolanda Batagelj	Slovenia	28 August 2002	Rovereto	
21		2:31.67	Halimah Nakaayi	Uganda	11 July 2025	Monaco	
22		2:31.74	Anita Weiß	East Germany	13 July 1980	Potsdam	
23		2:31.77	Sigrun Wodars-Grau	East Germany	17 August 1990	Berlin	
24		2:31.80	Regina Jacobs	United States	3 July 1999	Brunswick	
25		2:31.85	Doina Melinte	Romania	17 August 1990	Berlin	

=== Women (indoor) ===
- Correct as of January 2026.

Ath.#	Perf.#	Time	Athlete	Nation	Date	Place	Ref.
1	1	2:30.94	Maria Mutola	Mozambique	15 February 1999	Stockholm	
	2	2:31.23	Mutola #2		25 February 1996	Stockholm	
2	3	2:31.93	Laura Muir	Great Britain	18 February 2017	Birmingham	
	4	2:32.08	Mutola #3		10 February 1996	Birmingham	
3	5	2:32.16	Yuliya Chizhenko-Fomenko	Russia	25 January 2006	Moscow	
4	6	2:32.21	Oksana Zbrozhek	Russia	28 January 2007	Moscow	
5	7	2:32.40	Yelene Soboleva	Russia	25 January 2006	Moscow	
6	8	2:32.91	Yelena Kanales	Russia	25 January 2006	Moscow	
7	9	2:32.96	Kelly Holmes	Great Britain	20 February 2004	Birmingham	
8	10	2:33.06	Genzebe Dibaba	Ethiopia	24 February 2017	Madrid	
	11	2:33.47	Muir #2		15 February 2020	Glasgow	
9	12	2:33.75	Lucia Stafford	Canada	28 January 2023	Boston	
10	13	2:33.93	Inna Yevseyeva	Ukraine	7 February 1992	Moscow	
11	14	2:34.09 OT	Nikki Hiltz	United States	26 January 2024	Seattle	
12	15	2:34.19	Jennifer Toomey	United States	20 February 2004	Birmingham	
13	16	2:34.30	Anna Alminova	Russia	1 February 2009	Moscow	
	17	2:34.53	Muir #3		25 February 2023	Birmingham	
14	18	2:34.56	Mariya Savinova	Russia	1 February 2009	Moscow	
	19	2:34.61	Mutola #4		23 February 2003	Liévin	
15	20	2:34.64	Danielle Jones	United States	10 February 2023	Boston	
16	21	2:34.67	Liliya Nurutdinova	Russia	1 February 1992	Moscow	
	21	2:34.67	Nurutdinova #2		7 February 1992	Moscow	
17	23	2:34.68	Olga Raspopova	Russia	1 February 2004	Moscow	
18	24	2:34.71	Ajee Wilson	United States	24 February 2019	New York	
18	24	2:34.71 OT	Jessica Hull	Australia	27 January 2024	Seattle	
20		2:34.73	Joanne Fenn	Great Britain	20 February 2004	Birmingham	
21		2:34.76	Tatyana Petlyuk	Ukraine	28 January 2007	Moscow	
22		2:34.8 h	Brigitte Kraus	West Germany	19 February 1978	Dortmund	
23		2:34.84	Lyubov Kremlyova	Russia	13 February 1993	Liévin	
24		2:35.03	Heather Maclean	United States	10 February 2023	Boston	
25		2:35.17	Gabija Galvydytė	Lithuania	16 January 2026	Manhattan	
