= Fernando Arlete =

Fernando Arlete may refer to:

- Fernando Arlete (sprinter) (born 1979), Guinea-Bissauan sprinter
- Fernando Arlete (distance runner) (born 1968), Guinea-Bissauan distance runner
