= Guinea-Bissau at the 1996 Summer Olympics =

- IOC code: GBS
- NOC: Guinea-Bissau Olympic Committee
- Website: cogb.gw

in Atlanta
- Competitors: 3 in 2 sports
- Flag bearer: Talata Embalo
- Medals: Gold 0 Silver 0 Bronze 0 Total 0

Summer Olympics appearances (overview)
- 1996; 2000; 2004; 2008; 2012; 2016; 2020; 2024

Guinea-Bissau competed in the Olympic Games for the first time at the 1996 Summer Olympics in Atlanta, United States.

== Competitors ==
The following is the list of number of competitors in the Games.

Sport	Men	Women	Total
Athletics	2	0	2
Wrestling	1	–	1
Total	3	0	3

== Results by event ==
=== Athletics ===
==== Men ====
Track and road events

Athletes	Events	Heat Round 1		Heat Round 2		Semifinal		Final	
Athletes	Events	Time	Rank	Time	Rank	Time	Rank	Time	Rank
Amarildo Almeida	100 metres	10.85	85	did not advance					
Fernando Arlete	800 metres	2:00.07	56	N/A		did not advance			

=== Wrestling ===
Freestyle

Athlete	Event	Round 1	Round 2	Quarterfinal	Semifinal	Final	Repechage Round 1	Repechage Round 2	Repechage Round 3	Repechage Round 4	Repechage Round 5	Bronze Medal Bout
Athlete	Event	Opposition Result	Opposition Result	Opposition Result	Opposition Result	Opposition Result	Opposition Result	Opposition Result	Opposition Result	Opposition Result	Opposition Result	Opposition Result
Talata Embalo	-57 kg	Cross (USA); L 10-0	did not advance				bye	Doğan (TUR); L 3-0	did not advance			
