= Winston Tang =

American-Taiwanese-Bissau-Guinean skier (born 2006)

Personal information
- National team: Guinea-Bissau
- Born: 7 July 2006 (age 20) Oregon, United States
- Home town: Park City, Utah
- Education: Winter Sports School
- Parent: Thomas Tang (father)

Sport
- Sport: Alpine skiing

Winston Tang (Chinese: 唐寧希; born 7 July 2006) is an American, Taiwanese, and Bissau-Guinean alpine skier. He represented Guinea-Bissau at the men's slalom event at the 2026 Winter Olympics, becoming the first person to represent the country at the Winter Olympics.

== Early life and education ==
Winston Tang was born on 7 July 2006 in Oregon, United States, to Thomas Tang and Penny Tang; his older sisters are Emma Tang and Calcy Tang. Both Thomas and Calcy have represented Chinese Taipei in alpine skiing, Thomas at the 1988 and 1992 Winter Olympics and Calcy at the FIS Alpine World Ski Championships 2021. Growing up in Park City, Utah, Winston learned how to ski at the age of two and began competing at the age of eight. He studied at the Winter Sports School in Park City, Utah.

== Career ==
Tang's father, a businessman, began to look for investment opportunities in 2022 in Guinea-Bissau's cashew industry. Through this, he met several government and non-government authorities, and participation in the Winter Olympics was mentioned during one of the dialogues. An interlocutor noticed this and recommended the creation of the Winter Sports Federation of Guinea-Bissau in order for the nation to qualify for the Winter Olympics. Around this time, Winston Tang started to compete for Chinese Taipei in international competition. The federation was founded in February 2024 and was made an associate member of the International Ski and Snowboard Federation (FIS) in June 2024.

Tang changed his sporting nationality to American and began to compete under the auspices of U.S. Ski & Snowboard. The Winter Sports Federation of Guinea-Bissau had no registered athletes. In 2025 however, the Bissau-Guinean government's ministers voted to grant Tang Bissau-Guinean nationality through his father's connection to the nation (Note: Individuals can be granted Bissau-Guinean nationality if they have an affiliation to the country.) to allow him to represent the nation at the 2026 Winter Olympics, and Tang changed his sporting nationality to Bissau-Guinean in June 2025 upon approval by the FIS. His first competition representing the nation was at an FIS Entry League men's slalom race held at Ski Dubai.

He was awarded an Olympic Scholarship by the International Olympic Committee to assist with his preparations for the Winter Games. Through the basic quota, Guinea-Bissau was eligible to send one male alpine skier to the Games, and Winston was selected. He trained in Bosnia and Herzegovina. During the 2026 Winter Olympics opening ceremony and closing ceremony, Tang was the flag bearer for the nation. He participated in the men's slalom event, but did not finish.
