= Track and field at the 2011 Military World Games – Men's 800 metres =

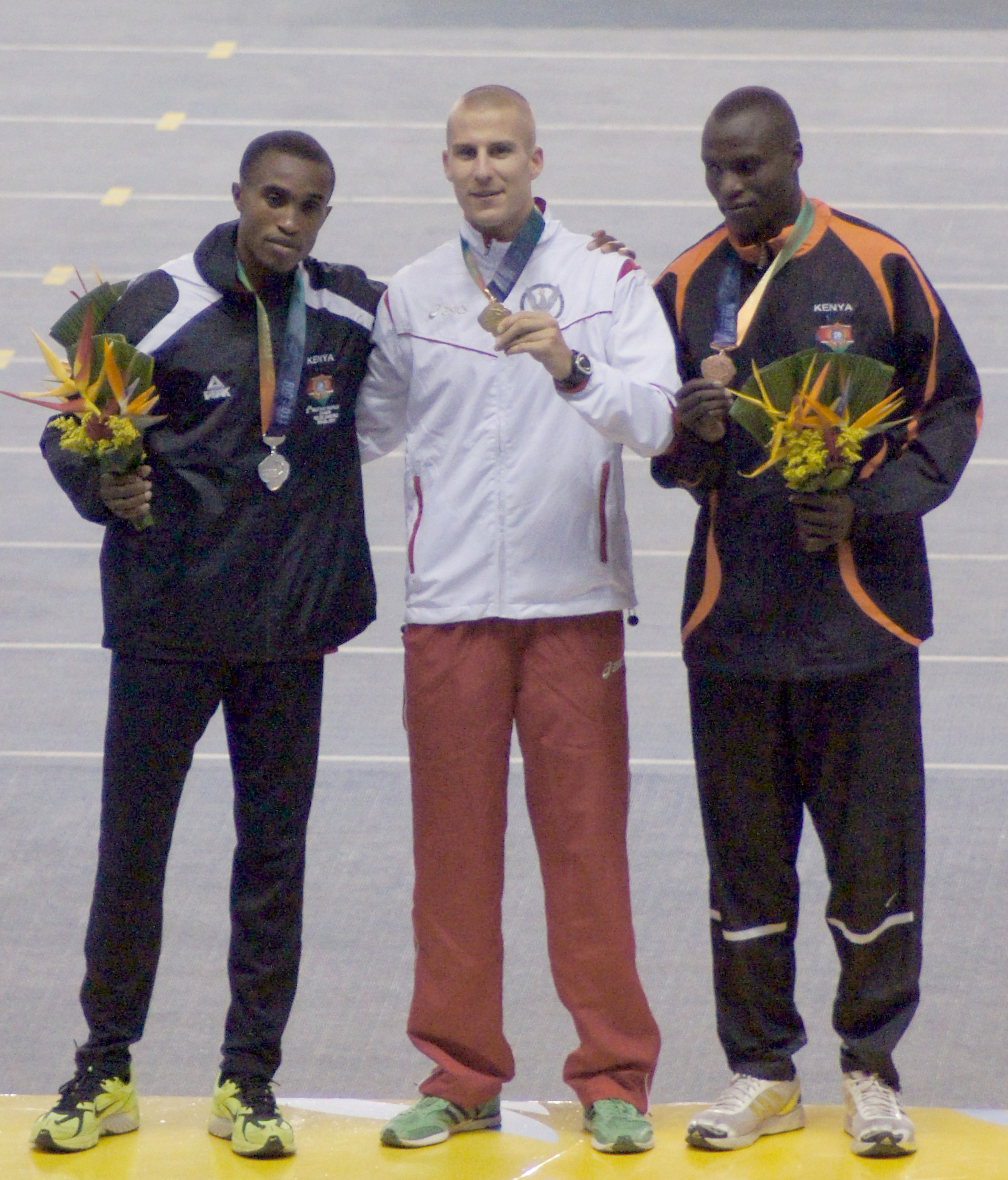
Left-right: Jackson Kivuva, Marcin Lewandowski, Geoffrey Matum

The men's 800 metres event at the 2011 Military World Games was held on 19 and 20 and 22 July at the Estádio Olímpico João Havelange.

== Records ==
Prior to this competition, the existing world and CISM record were as follows:

| World Record | David Rudisha (KEN) | 1:41.01 | Rieti, Italy | 29 August 2010 |
| CISM World Record | Philip Kibitok (KEN) | 1:45.63 | Rome, Italy | September 1995 |

== Schedule ==
| Date | Time | Round |
|---|---|---|
| 19 July 2011 | 16:40 | Round 1 |
| 20 July 2011 | 17:40 | Semifinals |
| 22 July 2011 | 19:00 | Final |

== Medalists ==
| Gold | Silver | Bronze |
|---|---|---|
| Marcin Lewandowski; Poland | Jackson Kivuva; Kenya | Geoffrey Matum; Kenya |

== Results ==
=== Final ===
| Rank | Lane | Name | Nationality | Time | Notes |
|---|---|---|---|---|---|
| 1st place, gold medalist(s) | 5 | Marcin Lewandowski | Poland | 1:45.77 | |
| 2nd place, silver medalist(s) | 3 | Jackson Kivuva | Kenya | 1:45.93 | |
| 3rd place, bronze medalist(s) | 2 | Geoffrey Matum | Kenya | 1:45.94 | |
| 4 | 6 | Lutimar Paes | Brazil | 1:46.69 | |
| 5 | 8 | Yusuf Saad Kamel | Bahrain | 1:46.89 | |
| 6 | 4 | Fabiano Peçanha | Brazil | 1:46.94 | |
| 7 | 7 | Samir Khader | Algeria | 1:48.09 | |
| 8 | 1 | Girmay Hadgu | Eritrea | 1:48.13 | |
