= Johan Botha =

Johan Botha may refer to:

- Johan Botha (athlete) (born 1974), South African middle distance runner
- Johan Botha (cricketer) (born 1982), South African born Australian cricketer
- Johan Botha (tenor) (1965–2016), South African opera singer
