= Tang Wei-tsu =

Taiwanese skier and businessman (born 1964)

Tang Wei-tsu OLY
Personal information
- National team: Chinese Taipei
- Born: 25 July 1964 (age 62) Taipei, Taiwan
- Education: University of Utah
- Children: Winston Tang; Calcy Tang; Emma Tang

Sport
- Sport: Alpine skiing

Tang Wei-tsu (Chinese: 唐慰祖, also known as Thomas Wei-tsu Tang; born 25 July 1964) is a Taiwanese and American alpine skier and businessman. He competed for Chinese Taipei at the 1988 Winter Olympics and the 1992 Winter Olympics. He is also the father of Olympian Winston Tang.

== Early life and education ==
Tang Wei-tsu was born in Taipei in 1964. As a child, he attended a private school called Tsai Hsin but struggled academically. His father, Tang Mei-Chun, was a professor of anthropology at National Taiwan University. An exchange professorship program moved the family from Taipei to Salt Lake City so that his father could work at the University of Utah in 1977, when Tang Wei-tsu was 13 years old. He attended Bryant Junior High School and East High School. In 1989, he received a bachelor's degree in physics at the University of Utah and then began working at Evans & Sutherland.

== Olympics ==
Tang represented Chinese Taipei at the 1988 Winter Olympics in alpine skiing. He participated in the men's super-G event and the men's slalom event; he was disqualified from both. He returned for alpine skiing at the 1992 Winter Olympics, where he did not finish the men's super-G event and did not start the men's giant slalom event.

== Business career ==
Tang was previously the director of marketing for Philips Broadcast in West Valley City, Utah. Following the divestment of Philips Broadcast, he oversaw areas such as sales, marketing, strategic planning, and product development while working at a small company based in Redmond, Washington. In 2008, he quit that company and founded Apantac LLC, a company specializing in signal processing equipment. The company released its first product, the Multiviewer, in 2009. It won the Pick Hit Award at the National Association of Broadcasters conference.

== Personal life ==
He is married to Penny Tang, with whom he has three children: Emma, Calcy, and Winston. Calcy Tang competed at the FIS Alpine World Ski Championships 2021. In 2022, Thomas Tang began looking for investment opportunities in the Bissau-Guinean cashew industry. Through this, he had meetings with several government and non-government authorities, with his participation at the Winter Olympics being mentioned during one of the dialogues. An interlocutor noticed this and recommended the creation of the Winter Sports Federation of Guinea-Bissau in order for the nation to qualify for the Winter Olympics. His son Winston was granted Bissau-Guinean nationality and represented Guinea-Bissau at the 2026 Winter Olympics.
