= Guinea-Bissau at the 2024 Summer Olympics =

- IOC code: GBS
- NOC: Guinea-Bissau Olympic Committee
- Website: cogb.gw

in Paris, France 26 July 2024 – 11 August 2024
- Competitors: 6 (6 men and 0 women) in 5 sports
- Flag bearer (opening): Diamantino Iuna Fafé
- Flag bearer (closing): Diamantino Iuna Fafé
- Medals: Gold 0 Silver 0 Bronze 0 Total 0

Summer Olympics appearances (overview)
- 1996; 2000; 2004; 2008; 2012; 2016; 2020; 2024

Guinea-Bissau competed at the 2024 Summer Olympics in Paris, France, from 26 July to 11 August 2024.

== Competitors ==
Sport	Men	Women	Total
Athletics	1	0	1
Judo	1	0	1
Swimming	1	0	1
Taekwondo	1	0	1
Wrestling	2	0	2
Total	6	0	6

== Athletics ==
Guinea-Bissau sent one athlete, Seco Camara, to compete in the Men's 100m race.

Key

- Note–Ranks given for track events are within the athlete's heat only
- Q = Qualified for the next round
- q = Qualified for the next round as a fastest loser or, in field events, by position without achieving the qualifying target
- NR = National record
- N/A = Round not applicable for the event
- Bye = Athlete not required to compete in round

Track events

Athlete	Event	Preliminary		Round 1		Semifinal		Final	
Athlete	Event	Result	Rank	Result	Rank	Result	Rank	Result	Rank
Seco Camara	Men's 100 m	10.76	5	Did not advance					

== Judo ==
Guinea-Bissau qualified one judoka, Bubacar Mané, for the men's super-heavyweight (+100 kg) class at the Games. He qualified via a continental quota based on Olympic point rankings.

Athlete	Event	Round of 64	Round of 32	Round of 16	Quarterfinals	Semifinals	Repechage	Final / BM	
Athlete	Event	Opposition Result	Opposition Result	Opposition Result	Opposition Result	Opposition Result	Opposition Result	Opposition Result	Rank
Bubacar Mané	Men's +100 kg	—	Ndiaye (SEN); L 00-10	Did not advance					

== Swimming ==
Guinea-Bissau sent one swimmer to these Olympics, marking the nation's debut in this sport.

Athlete	Event	Heat		Semifinal		Final	
Athlete	Event	Time	Rank	Time	Rank	Time	Rank
Pedro Rogery	Men's 50 m freestyle	28.34	66	Did not advance			

Qualifiers for the latter rounds (Q) of all events were determined based on time only; therefore, the positions shown reflect overall results compared to competitors in all heats.

== Taekwondo ==
Guinea-Bissau sent one taekwondo practitioner, Paivou Gomis, who received a quota based on Universality places, marking the nation's Olympic debut in taekwondo.

Athlete	Event	Round of 16	Quarterfinals	Semifinals	Repechage	Final / BM	
Athlete	Event	Opposition Result	Opposition Result	Opposition Result	Opposition Result	Opposition Result	Rank
Paivou Gomis	Men's +80 kg	Sansores (MEX); L 1–8, 1–7	Did not advance				

== Wrestling ==
Guinea-Bissau qualified two wrestlers at the 2024 African & Oceania Olympic Qualification Tournament in Alexandria, Egypt.

Key:

- VT (ranking points: 5–0 or 0–5) – Victory by fall.
- VB (ranking points: 5–0 or 0–5) – Victory by injury (VF for forfeit, VA for withdrawal or disqualification)
- PP (ranking points: 3–1 or 1–3) – Decision by points – the loser with technical points.
- PO (ranking points: 3–0 or 0–3) – Decision by points – the loser without technical points.
- ST (ranking points: 4–0 or 0–4) – Great superiority – the loser without technical points and a margin of victory of at least 8 (Greco-Roman) or 10 (freestyle) points.
- SP (ranking points: 4–1 or 1–4) – Technical superiority – the loser with technical points and a margin of victory of at least 8 (Greco-Roman) or 10 (freestyle) points.

Freestyle

Athlete	Event	Round of 16	Quarterfinal	Semifinal	Repechage	Final / BM	
Athlete	Event	Opposition Result	Opposition Result	Opposition Result	Opposition Result	Opposition Result	Rank
Diamantino Iuna Fafé	Men's −57 kg	Abakarov (ALB); L 6–7	Did not advance				
Bacar Ndum	Men's −74 kg	Emami (IRI); L 10–0	Did not advance				
