= Athletics at the 2000 Summer Olympics – Women's 800 metres =

Women's 800 metres at the Games of the XXVII Olympiad
- Venue: Stadium Australia
- Date: 22 September 2000 (heats); 23 September 2000 (semi-finals); 25 September 2000 (final)
- Competitors: 38 from 30 nations
- Winning time: 1:56.15

Medalists
1st place, gold medalist(s)		Maria Mutola; Mozambique
2nd place, silver medalist(s)		Stephanie Graf; Austria
3rd place, bronze medalist(s)		Kelly Holmes; Great Britain

Video on YouTube Official Video Highlights @ 16:25

The Women's 800 metres at the 2000 Summer Olympics as part of the athletics programme was held at Stadium Australia on Friday 22 September, Saturday 23 September, and Monday 25 September 2000.

The top two runners in each of the initial five heats automatically qualified for the semi-final. The next six fastest runners from across the heats also qualified for the semi-final.

The top three runners in each semi-final automatically qualified for the final. The next two fastest runners from across the heats also qualified for the final.

There were a total number of 39 participating athletes.

In the final, Helena Fuchsová took her lane 1 position out to the lead, with Brigita Langerholc sweeping across the track from lane 8 to shut the door on Hazel Clark and the rest of the pack. Fuchsova held the lead through a 55.04 first lap and on to 600 metres in 1:25.5. Behind her the pack scrambled for position with Kelly Holmes on Fuchsova's shoulder. Holmes, then Maria Mutola, then Stephanie Graf all passed on the final turn. On the final straightaway, Mutola ran strong on the outside, advancing past Holmes, with Graf sprinting past for silver. Four years later, it would be reversed, with Holmes running past Mutoloa on the final straight.

== Records ==
World Record	1:53.28	Jarmila Kratochvílová	Czechoslovakia	Munich, West Germany	26 July 1983
Olympic Record	1:53.43	Nadiya Olizarenko	Soviet Union	Moscow, Soviet Union	27 February 1980

== Medals ==
Gold:	Silver:	Bronze:
Maria Mutola, Mozambique	Stephanie Graf, Austria	Kelly Holmes, Great Britain

== Results ==
All times shown are in seconds.

- Q denotes qualification by place in heat.
- q denotes qualification by overall place.
- DNS denotes did not start.
- DNF denotes did not finish.
- DQ denotes disqualification.
- NR denotes national record.
- OR denotes Olympic record.
- WR denotes world record.
- PB denotes personal best.
- SB denotes season best.

== Qualifying heats ==
=== Round 1 ===
Heat 1 of 5 Date: Friday 22 September 2000
Place		Athlete	Nation	Lane	Time	Qual.	Record
Heat	Overall	Athlete	Nation	Lane	Time	Qual.	Record
1	7	Maria Mutola	Mozambique	5	1:59.88	Q	
2	10	Tamsyn Lewis	Australia	3	2:00.33	Q	
3	11	Hasna Benhassi	Morocco	8	2:00.50	q	
4	22	Natalya Dukhnova	Belarus	1	2:03.20		
5	25	Grace Birungi	Uganda	6	2:03.32		
6	26	Olena Buzhenko	Ukraine	7	2:03:48		
7	27	Florencia Hunt	Netherlands Antilles	4	2:03.78		NR
8	32	Direma Banasso	Togo	2	2:13.67		PB

Heat 2 of 5 Date: Friday 22 September 2000
Place		Athlete	Nation	Lane	Time	Qual.	Record
Heat	Overall	Athlete	Nation	Lane	Time	Qual.	Record
1	14	Jearl Miles Clark	United States	3	2:01.79	Q	
2	15	Brigita Langerholc	Slovenia	7	2:01.89	Q	
3	16	Olga Raspopova	Russia	1	2:01.95		
4	18	Letitia Vriesde	Suriname	2	2:02.09		
5	23	Mina Ait Hammou	Morocco	5	2:03.25		
6	28	Leontine Tsiba	Republic of the Congo	6	2:04:08		NR
7	30	Elena Iagăr	Romania	8	2:07.56		
8	37	Roda Ali Wais	Djibouti	4	2:31.71		

Heat 3 of 5 Date: Friday 22 September 2000
Place		Athlete	Nation	Lane	Time	Qual.	Record
Heat	Overall	Athlete	Nation	Lane	Time	Qual.	Record
1	5	Mayte Martínez	Spain	3	1:59.60	Q	PB
2	6	Irina Mistyukevich	Russia	6	1:59.73	Q	
3	8	Zulia Calatayud	Cuba	8	2:00.18	q	
4	9	Joetta Clark Diggs	United States	4	2:00.19	q	
5	12	Charmaine Howell	Jamaica	7	2:01.14	q	
6	33	Christine Mukamutesi	Rwanda	5	2:14:15		
7	36	Anhel Cape	Guinea-Bissau	1	2:17.05		
		Ludmila Formanová	Czech Republic	2	DNF		

Heat 4 of 5 Date: Friday 22 September 2000
Place		Athlete	Nation	Lane	Time	Qual.	Record
Heat	Overall	Athlete	Nation	Lane	Time	Qual.	Record
1	13	Kelly Holmes	Great Britain	6	2:01.76	Q	
2	17	Hazel Clark	United States	5	2:01.99	Q	
3	19	Natalya Tsyganova	Russia	8	2:02.26		
4	20	Sandra Stals	Belgium	4	2:02.33		
5	24	Susan Andrews	Australia	1	2:03.31		
6	29	Irina Latve	Latvia	2	2:06:05		
7	35	Delfina Cassinda	Angola	3	2:15.02		

Heat 5 of 5 Date: Friday 22 September 2000
Place		Athlete	Nation	Lane	Time	Qual.	Record
Heat	Overall	Athlete	Nation	Lane	Time	Qual.	Record
1	1	Stephanie Graf	Austria	1	1:58.39	Q	
2	2	Claudia Gesell	Germany	2	1:58.56	Q	
3	3	Helena Fuchsová	Czech Republic	4	1:58.97	q	SB
4	4	Toni Hodgkinson	New Zealand	7	1:59.37	q	
5	21	Diane Modahl	Great Britain	5	2:02.41		
6	31	Adama Njie	The Gambia	6	2:07:90		SB
7	34	Anna Nasilyan	Armenia	8	2:14.86		
		Tina Paulino	Mozambique	3	DNS		

Overall Results Round 1

Round 1 Overall Results
Place	Athlete	Nation	Heat	Lane	Place	Time	Qual.	Record
1	Stephanie Graf	Austria	5	1	1	1:58.39	Q	
2	Claudia Gesell	Germany	5	2	2	1:58.56	Q	
3	Helena Fuchsová	Czech Republic	5	4	3	1:58.97	q	SB
4	Toni Hodgkinson	New Zealand	5	7	4	1:59.37	q	
5	Mayte Martínez	Spain	3	3	1	1:59.60	Q	PB
6	Irina Mistyukevich	Russia	3	6	3	1:59.73	Q	
7	Maria Mutola	Mozambique	1	5	1	1:59.88	Q	
8	Zulia Calatayud	Cuba	2	8	3	2:00.18	q	
9	Joetta Clark Diggs	United States	3	4	4	2:00.19	q	
10	Tamsyn Lewis	Australia	1	3	2	2:00.23	Q	
11	Hasna Benhassi	Morocco	1	8	3	2:00.50	q	
12	Charmaine Howell	Jamaica	3	7	5	2:01.14	q	
13	Kelly Holmes	Great Britain	4	6	1	2:01.76	Q	
14	Jearl Miles Clark	United States	2	3	1	2:01.79	Q	
15	Brigita Langerholc	Slovenia	2	7	2	2:01.89	Q	
16	Olga Raspopova	Russia	2	1	3	2:01.95		
17	Hazel Clark	United States	4	5	2	2:01.99	Q	
18	Letitia Vriesde	Suriname	2	2	4	2:02.09		
19	Natalya Tsyganova	Russia	4	8	3	2:02.25		
20	Sandra Stals	Belgium	4	4	4	2:02.33		
21	Diane Modahl	Great Britain	5	5	5	2:02.41		
22	Natalya Dukhnova	Belarus	1	1	4	2:03.20		
23	Mina Ait Hammou	Morocco	2	5	5	2:03.25		
24	Susan Andrews	Australia	4	1	5	2:03.31		
25	Grace Birungi	Uganda	1	6	5	2:03.32		
26	Olena Buzhenko	Ukraine	1	7	6	2:03.48		
27	Florencia Hunt	Netherlands Antilles	1	4	7	2:03.78		NR
28	Leontine Tsiba	Republic of the Congo	2	6	6	2:04.08		
29	Irina Latve	Latvia	4	2	6	2:06.05		
30	Elena Iagăr	Romania	2	8	7	2:07.56		
31	Adama Njie	The Gambia	5	6	6	2:07.90		SB
32	Direma Banasso	Togo	1	2	8	2:13.67		PB
33	Christine Mukamutesi	Rwanda	3	5	6	2:14.15		
34	Anna Nasilyan	Armenia	5	8	7	2:14:86		
35	Delfina Cassinda	Angola	4	3	7	2:15.02		
36	Anhel Cape	Guinea-Bissau	3	1	7	2:17.05		
37	Roda Ali Wais	Djibouti	2	4	8	2:31.71		
	Ludmila Formanová	Czech Republic	3	2		DNF		
	Tina Paulino	Mozambique	5	3		DNS		

=== Semi-finals ===
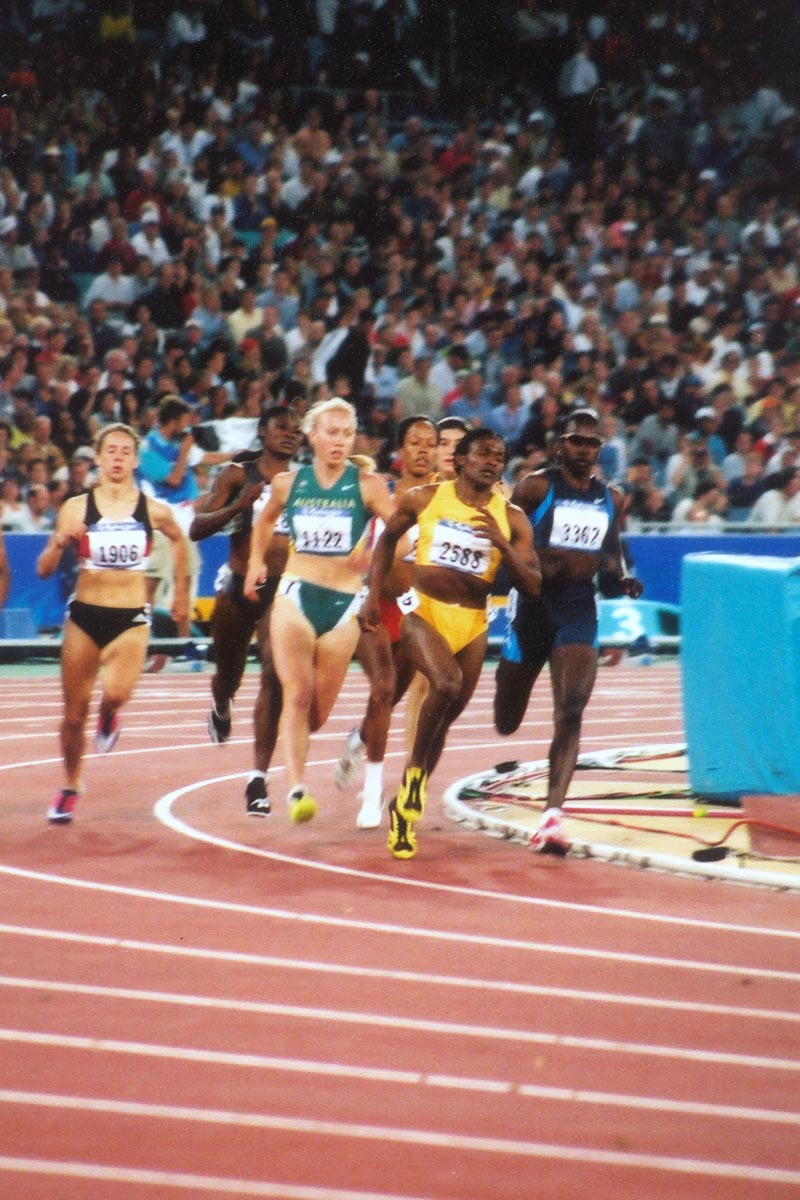
Semifinal 1

Heat 1 of 2 Date: Saturday 23 September 2000
Place		Athlete	Nation	Lane	Time	Qual.	Record
Heat	Overall	Athlete	Nation	Lane	Time	Qual.	Record
1	4	Maria Mutola	Mozambique	5	1:58.56	Q	
2	7	Hasna Benhassi	Morocco	4	1:59.19	Q	
3	8	Zulia Calatayud	Cuba	2	1:59.30	Q	PB
4	9	Tamsyn Lewis	Australia	7	1:59.33		
5	10	Jearl Miles Clark	United States	3	1:59.44		
6	11	Claudia Gesell	Germany	6	1:59:69		
7	13	Charmaine Howell	Jamaica	8	2:00.63		PB
8	15	Mayte Martínez	Spain	1	2:03.27		

Heat 2 of 2 Date: Saturday 23 September 2000
Place		Athlete	Nation	Lane	Time	Qual.	Record
Heat	Overall	Athlete	Nation	Lane	Time	Qual.	Record
1	1	Stephanie Graf	Austria	3	1:57.56	Q	
2	2	Kelly Holmes	Great Britain	1	1:58.45	Q	SB
3	3	Helena Fuchsová	Czech Republic	4	1:58.82	Q	SB
4	5	Brigita Langerholc	Slovenia	1	1:59.09	q	NR
5	6	Hazel Clark	United States	6	1:59.12	q	
6	12	Toni Hodgkinson	New Zealand	7	1:59:84		
7	14	Irina Mistyukevich	Russia	5	2:02.95		
8	16	Joetta Clark Diggs	United States	8	2:04.12		

Overall Results Semi-finals

Semi-final Overall Results
Place	Athlete	Nation	Heat	Lane	Place	Time	Qual.	Record
1	Stephanie Graf	Austria	2	3	1	1:57.56	Q	
2	Kelly Holmes	Great Britain	1	2	2	1:58.45	Q	SB
3	Helena Fuchsová	Czech Republic	2	4	3	1:58.82	Q	SB
4	Maria Mutola	Mozambique	1	5	1	1:58.86	Q	
5	Brigita Langerholc	Slovenia	2	1	4	1:59.96	q	NR
6	Hazel Clark	United States	2	6	5	1:59.12	q	
7	Hasna Benhassi	Morocco	1	4	2	1:59.19	Q	
8	Zulia Calatayud	Cuba	1	2	3	1:59.30	Q	PB
9	Tamsyn Lewis	Australia	1	7	4	1:59.33		
10	Jearl Miles Clark	United States	1	3	5	1:59.44		
11	Claudia Gesell	Germany	1	6	6	1:59.69		
12	Toni Hodgkinson	New Zealand	2	7	6	1:59.84		
13	Charmaine Howell	Jamaica	1	8	7	2:00.63		PB
14	Irina Mistyukevich	Russia	2	5	7	2:02.95		
15	Mayte Martínez	Spain	1	1	8	2:03.27		
16	Joetta Clark Diggs	United States	2	8	8	2:04.12		

== Final ==
Date: Monday 25 September 2000
Place	Athlete	Nation	Lane	Time	Record
1st place, gold medalist(s)	Maria Mutola	Mozambique	6	1:56.15	SB
2nd place, silver medalist(s)	Stephanie Graf	Austria	5	1:56.64	NR
3rd place, bronze medalist(s)	Kelly Holmes	Great Britain	3	1:56.80	SB
4	Brigita Langerholc	Slovenia	8	1:58.51	NR
5	Helena Fuchsová	Czech Republic	1	1:58.56	PB
6	Zulia Calatayud	Cuba	7	1:58.66	PB
7	Hazel Clark	United States	2	1:58.75	
8	Hasna Benhassi	Morocco	4	1:59.17	
