= Guinea-Bissau at the 2020 Summer Olympics =

- IOC code: GBS
- NOC: Guinea-Bissau Olympic Committee
- Website: cogb.gw

in Tokyo, Japan July 23, 2021 – August 8, 2021
- Competitors: 4 in 3 sports
- Flag bearer (opening): Taciana Cesar
- Flag bearer (closing): Augusto Midana
- Medals: Gold 0 Silver 0 Bronze 0 Total 0

Summer Olympics appearances (overview)
- 1996; 2000; 2004; 2008; 2012; 2016; 2020; 2024

Guinea-Bissau competed at the 2020 Summer Olympics in Tokyo. Originally scheduled to take place from 24 July to 9 August 2020, the Games were postponed to 23 July to 8 August 2021, because of the COVID-19 pandemic. It was the nation's seventh consecutive appearance at the Summer Olympics.

== Competitors ==
The following is the list of number of competitors in the Games.

Sport	Men	Women	Total
Athletics	1	0	1
Judo	0	1	1
Wrestling	2	0	2
Total	3	1	4

== Athletics ==
Guinea-Bissau received universality slots from World Athletics to send two athletes (one male and one female).

Key

- Note–Ranks given for track events are within the athlete's heat only
- Q = Qualified for the next round
- q = Qualified for the next round as a fastest loser or, in field events, by position without achieving the qualifying target
- NR = National record
- N/A = Round not applicable for the event
- Bye = Athlete not required to compete in round

Track & road events

Athlete	Event	Heat		Quarterfinal		Semifinal		Final	
Athlete	Event	Result	Rank	Result	Rank	Result	Rank	Result	Rank
Seco Camara	Men's 100 m	11.33 PB	7	Did not advance					

== Judo ==
Guinea-Bissau qualified one judoka for the women's half-lightweight category (52 kg). Rio 2016 Olympian Taciana Cesar received an African continental quota as the nation's top-ranked judoka outside of direct qualifying position on the IJF World Ranking List of June 28, 2021.

Athlete	Event	Round of 32	Round of 16	Quarterfinals	Semifinals	Repechage	Final / BM	
Athlete	Event	Opposition Result	Opposition Result	Opposition Result	Opposition Result	Opposition Result	Opposition Result	Rank
Taciana Cesar	Women's –52 kg	Park D-s (KOR); L 00–11	Did not advance					

== Wrestling ==
Guinea-Bissau qualified two male freestyle wrestlers, both of whom progressed to the top two of their respective events at the 2021 African & Oceania Qualification Tournament in Hammamet, Tunisia.

Key:

- VT (ranking points: 5–0 or 0–5) – Victory by fall.
- VB (ranking points: 5–0 or 0–5) – Victory by injury (VF for forfeit, VA for withdrawal or disqualification)
- PP (ranking points: 3–1 or 1–3) – Decision by points – the loser with technical points.
- PO (ranking points: 3–0 or 0–3) – Decision by points – the loser without technical points.
- ST (ranking points: 4–0 or 0–4) – Great superiority – the loser without technical points and a margin of victory of at least 8 (Greco-Roman) or 10 (freestyle) points.
- SP (ranking points: 4–1 or 1–4) – Technical superiority – the loser with technical points and a margin of victory of at least 8 (Greco-Roman) or 10 (freestyle) points.

Freestyle
Men

Athlete	Event	Round of 16	Quarterfinal	Semifinal	Repechage	Final / BM	
Athlete	Event	Opposition Result	Opposition Result	Opposition Result	Opposition Result	Opposition Result	Rank
Diamantino Iuna Fafé	−57 kg	Sanayev (KAZ); L 0–3 ^{PO}	Did not advance				15
Augusto Midana	−74 kg	Sidakov (ROC); L 1–4 ^{SP}	Did not advance		Abdurakhmonov (UZB); L 0–4 ^{ST}	Did not advance	11
