= Guinea-Bissau at the 2008 Summer Olympics =

- IOC code: GBS
- NOC: Guinea-Bissau Olympic Committee

in Beijing
- Competitors: 3 in 2 sports
- Flag bearer: Augusto Midana
- Medals: Gold 0 Silver 0 Bronze 0 Total 0

Summer Olympics appearances (overview)
- 1996; 2000; 2004; 2008; 2012; 2016; 2020; 2024

Guinea-Bissau was represented at the 2008 Summer Olympics in Beijing, China by the Guinea-Bissau Olympic Committee.

In total, three athletes including two men and one woman represented Guinea-Bissau in two different sports including athletics and wrestling.

== Background ==
Guinea-Bissau made their Olympic debut at the 1996 Summer Olympics in Atlanta, Georgia, United States. The 2008 Summer Olympics in Beijing, China marked their fourth appearance at the Summer Olympics.

== Competitors ==
In total, three athletes represented Guinea-Bissau at the 2008 Summer Olympics in Beijing, China across different sports.

Sport	Men	Women	Total
Athletics	1	1	2
Wrestling	1	0	1
Total	2	1	3

== Athletics ==
In total, two Bissau-Guinean athletes participated in the athletics events – Holder da Silva in the men's 100 m and Domingas Togna in the women's 1,500 m.

The athletics events took place at the Beijing National Stadium in Chaoyang, Beijing from 15 to 24 August 2008.

The heats for the men's 100 m took place on 15 August 2008. Da Silva finished fifth in his heat in a time of 10.58 seconds and he did not advance to the quarter-finals.

Athlete	Event	Heat		Quarterfinal		Semifinal		Final	
Athlete	Event	Result	Rank	Result	Rank	Result	Rank	Result	Rank
Holder da Silva	100 m	10.58	5	did not advance					

The heats for the women's 1,500 m took place on 21 August 2008. Togna finished 11th in her heat in a time of five minutes 5.76 seconds and she did not advance to the final.

Athlete	Event	Heat		Final	
Athlete	Event	Result	Rank	Result	Rank
Domingas Togna	1,500 m	5:05.76 NR	11	did not advance	

== Wrestling ==
In total, one Bissau-Guinean athlete participated in the wrestling events – Augusto Midana in the men's freestyle −74 kg category.

The wrestling events took place at the China Agricultural University Gymnasium in Haidian, Beijing from 12 to 21 August 2008.

The men's freestyle −74 kg category took place on 20 August 2008. Midana received a bye in the first round. In the second round, he lost to Gela Saghirashvili of Georgia.

Athlete	Event	Qualification	Round of 16	Quarterfinals	Semifinals	Repechage 1	Repechage 2	Final / BM	
Athlete	Event	Opposition Result	Opposition Result	Opposition Result	Opposition Result	Opposition Result	Opposition Result	Opposition Result	Rank
Augusto Midana	−74 kg	Bye	Saghirashvili (GEO); L 1–3 ^{PP}	did not advance					17
