= Crispen Mutakanyi =

Zimbabwean middle-distance runner

Medal record

Men's athletics

Representing Zimbabwe

African Championships
Silver medal – second place	1998 Dakar	4×400 m

Crispen Mutakanyi (born 15 March 1970) is a retired male middle-distance runner from Zimbabwe. He represented his country at the 2000 Summer Olympics in Sydney, Australia and the 1999 World Championships in Seville, Spain.

Mutakanyi has personal bests in the 800 metres of 1:45.1 minutes outdoors (Harare 1998) and 1:52.94 minutes indoors (Lisbon 2001).

== Competition record ==
Year	Competition	Venue	Position	Event	Notes
Representing Zimbabwe
1998	Commonwealth Games	Kuala Lumpur, Malaysia	7th	800 m	1:46.97
1999	World Championships	Seville, Spain	44th (h)	800 m	1:48.73
1999	All-Africa Games	Johannesburg, South Africa	10th (sf)	800 m	1:48.45
2000	Olympic Games	Sydney, Australia	15th (h)	800 m	3:05.60
2000	Olympic Games	Sydney, Australia	3rd (h)	4 × 400 m relay	3:05.62
2001	World Indoor Championships	Lisbon, Portugal	22nd (h)	800 m	1:52.94
2003	All-Africa Games	Abuja, Nigeria	7th	800 m	1:49.76
2003	All-Africa Games	Abuja, Nigeria	3rd	4 × 400 m relay	3:05.62
2003	Afro-Asian Games	Hyderabad, India	3rd	4 × 400 m relay	3:05.35
