= Themba Makhanya =

Swazi middle-distance runner

Personal information
- Nationality: Swazi
- Born: 25 August 1970
- Died: 4 November 2015 (aged 45)

Sport
- Sport: Middle-distance running
- Event: 800 metres

Themba Makhanya (25 August 1970 – 4 November 2015) was a Swazi middle-distance runner. He competed in the men's 800 metres at the 1996 Summer Olympics. He was the president of the Swaziland Athletics Federation.
