= Guinea-Bissau at the 2016 Summer Olympics =

- IOC code: GBS
- NOC: Guinea-Bissau Olympic Committee
- Website: cogb.gw

in Rio de Janeiro
- Competitors: 5 in 3 sports
- Flag bearer: Augusto Midana
- Medals: Gold 0 Silver 0 Bronze 0 Total 0

Summer Olympics appearances (overview)
- 1996; 2000; 2004; 2008; 2012; 2016; 2020; 2024

Guinea-Bissau competed at the 2016 Summer Olympics in Rio de Janeiro, from August 5 to 21, 2016. It was the nation's sixth consecutive appearance at the Summer Olympics.

Five Bissauan athletes, three men and two women, were selected to the team, competing only in athletics, judo, and freestyle wrestling. Half of Guinea-Bissau's roster made their Olympic debut, with track sprinter Holder da Silva and freestyle wrestler Augusto Midana returning for their third consecutive appearance in Rio de Janeiro. Midana also reprised his role of leading the Guinea-Bissau team for the third straight time as the nation's flag bearer in the opening ceremony. Guinea-Bissau, however, has yet to win its first Olympic medal.

== Athletics ==
Guinea-Bissau has received universality slots from IAAF to send two athletes (one male and one female) to the Olympics.

Key

- Note–Ranks given for track events are within the athlete's heat only
- Q = Qualified for the next round
- q = Qualified for the next round as a fastest loser or, in field events, by position without achieving the qualifying target
- NR = National record
- N/A = Round not applicable for the event
- Bye = Athlete not required to compete in round

Track & road events

Athlete	Event	Heat		Quarterfinal		Semifinal		Final	
Athlete	Event	Time	Rank	Time	Rank	Time	Rank	Time	Rank
Holder da Silva	Men's 100 m	10.97	4	did not advance					

Field events

Athlete	Event	Qualification		Final	
Athlete	Event	Distance	Position	Distance	Position
Jéssica Inchude	Women's shot put	15.15	36	did not advance	

== Judo ==
Guinea-Bissau has qualified one judoka for the women's extra-lightweight category (48 kg) at the Games, signifying the nation's Olympic debut in judo. Taciana Lima was directly ranked among the top 14 eligible judokas for women in the IJF World Ranking List of May 30, 2016.

Athlete	Event	Round of 32	Round of 16	Quarterfinals	Semifinals	Repechage	Final / BM	
Athlete	Event	Opposition Result	Opposition Result	Opposition Result	Opposition Result	Opposition Result	Opposition Result	Rank
Taciana Lima	Women's −48 kg	Bye	Galbadrakh (KAZ); L 010–010 S	did not advance				

== Wrestling ==
Guinea-Bissau has qualified one wrestler for the men's freestyle 74 kg into the Olympic competition, as a result of his semifinal triumph at the 2016 African & Oceania Qualification Tournament.

On May 11, 2016, United World Wrestling awarded an additional Olympic license to Guinea-Bissau in men's freestyle 97 kg, as a response to the doping violations for the Egyptian wrestler at the African Qualification Tournament, extending the roster size to two.

Key:

- VT – Victory by Fall.
- VB – Victory by injury.
- PP – Decision by Points – the loser with technical points.
- PO – Decision by Points – the loser without technical points.
- ST – Technical superiority – the loser without technical points and a margin of victory of at least 8 (Greco-Roman) or 10 (freestyle) points.

Men's freestyle

Athlete	Event	Qualification	Round of 16	Quarterfinal	Semifinal	Repechage 1	Repechage 2	Final / BM	
Athlete	Event	Opposition Result	Opposition Result	Opposition Result	Opposition Result	Opposition Result	Opposition Result	Opposition Result	Rank
Augusto Midana	−74 kg	Bye	Burroughs (USA); L 1–3 ^{PP}	did not advance					14
Bedopassa Buassat	−97 kg	Ibragimov (UZB); L 0–5 ^{VB}	did not advance						15
