= Guinea-Bissau at the 2012 Summer Olympics =

- IOC code: GBS
- NOC: Guinea-Bissau Olympic Committee
- Website: cogb.gw

in London
- Competitors: 4 in 2 sports
- Flag bearer: Augusto Midana
- Medals: Gold 0 Silver 0 Bronze 0 Total 0

Summer Olympics appearances (overview)
- 1996; 2000; 2004; 2008; 2012; 2016; 2020; 2024

Guinea-Bissau competed at the 2012 Summer Olympics in London, from 27 July to 12 August 2012. This was the nation's fifth consecutive appearance at the Olympics.

Four athletes from Guinea-Bissau were selected to the team, competing only in athletics and freestyle wrestling. Half of its team had competed in Beijing, including sprinter Holder da Silva and freestyle wrestler Augusto Midana; both of them advanced past the first round of their events. Midana reprised his role to be the nation's flag bearer at the opening ceremony. Guinea-Bissau won no medals at the games.

== Athletics ==
Men

Athlete	Event	Heat		Quarterfinal		Semifinal		Final	
Athlete	Event	Result	Rank	Result	Rank	Result	Rank	Result	Rank
Holder da Silva	100 m	10.69	3 q	10.71	7	did not advance			

Women

Athlete	Event	Heat		Semifinal		Final	
Athlete	Event	Result	Rank	Result	Rank	Result	Rank
Graciela Martins	400 m	58.30	6	did not advance			

== Wrestling ==
Guinea-Bissau has qualified two quota places.

Key:

- VT – Victory by Fall.
- PP – Decision by Points – the loser with technical points.
- PO – Decision by Points – the loser without technical points.

Men's freestyle

Athlete	Event	Qualification	Round of 16	Quarterfinal	Semifinal	Repechage 1	Repechage 2	Final / BM	
Athlete	Event	Opposition Result	Opposition Result	Opposition Result	Opposition Result	Opposition Result	Opposition Result	Opposition Result	Rank
Augusto Midana	−74 kg	Roberty (VEN); W 3–1 ^{PP}	Khutsishvili (GEO); L 1–3 ^{PP}	did not advance					7

Women's freestyle

Athlete	Event	Qualification	Round of 16	Quarterfinal	Semifinal	Repechage 1	Repechage 2	Final / BM	
Athlete	Event	Opposition Result	Opposition Result	Opposition Result	Opposition Result	Opposition Result	Opposition Result	Opposition Result	Rank
Jacira Mendonca	−63 kg	Sastin (HUN); L 0–3 ^{PO}	did not advance						17

== See also ==
- Guinea-Bissau at the 2012 Summer Paralympics
