= Irina Mistyukevich =

Russian middle-distance runner

Personal information
- Nationality: Russian
- Born: 17 June 1977 (age 49) Kurgan

Sport
- Sport: Middle-distance running
- Event: 800 metres

Irina Mistyukevich (born 17 June 1977) is a Russian middle-distance runner. She competed in the women's 800 metres at the 2000 Summer Olympics.
