= Anna Nasilyan =

Armenian middle-distance runner

Anna Nasilyan (Armenian: Աննա Նասիլյան, born 6 September 1980 in Vanadzor, Armenian SSR) is an Armenian middle distance runner. She competed at the 2000 Summer Olympics in the women's 800 metres. Nasilyan's best 800 meter timing is 2:10.83, achieved in 1999.
