= Irina Latve =

Latvian middle-distance runner

Personal information
- Nationality: Latvian
- Born: 26 August 1981 (age 44) Riga, Latvian SSR, Soviet Union
- Education: Riga Technical University

Sport
- Sport: Middle-distance running
- Event: 800 metres
- Club: SK Arkādija
- Coached by: Leonīds Strekalovskis

Irina Latve-Sļesarenoka (born Irina Latve; 26 August 1981 in Riga) is a Latvian middle-distance runner. She competed in the women's 800 metres at the 2000 Summer Olympics. Latve also won gold at the 800 m event at the 1999 European Athletics Junior Championships in Riga.

She also held three national records: in the 800 m (1999 and 2000) and 1500 m (1999) distances.
