= Cedric Harris =

Personal information
- Born: 28 February 1967 (age 59) Saint George, Dominica

Sport
- Sport: Track and field

Cedric Joshua Harris (born 28 February 1967) is a Dominica retired middle-distance runner who competed at the 1996 Summer Olympic Games in the men's 800 metres and finished 6th in his heat, failing to advance. Later, he served as a president of the Dominica Amateur Athletic Association.
