= David Kiptoo =

Kenyan middle-distance runner

David Singoei Kiptoo (born 25 June 1967 in Kapsabet) is a retired Kenyan athlete who competed mostly in the 800 metres. He represented his country at the 1996 Summer Olympics finishing sixth in the final.

Kiptoo competed for the LSU Tigers track and field team in the NCAA.

His personal bests in the event are 1:43.00 outdoors (1996) and 1:46.05 indoors (1999).

== Competition record ==
Year	Competition	Venue	Position	Event	Notes
Representing Kenya
1996	Olympic Games	Atlanta, United States	6th	800 m	1:44.19
1998	Goodwill Games	Uniondale, United States	3rd	800 m	1:46.05
1999	World Indoor Championships	Maebashi, Japan	9th (sf)	800 m	1:48.35
2001	Goodwill Games	Brisbane, Australia	9th	800 m	1:52.50
