= Winter Sports School =

Coordinates: 40°42′40″N 111°33′44″W

- Park City, Utah; United States

Information
- Website: www.wintersportsschool.org

Winter Sports School (WSS) is a college preparatory public charter school dedicated to winter sports located in Park City, Utah.

Winter Sports School was founded in 1994. Its academic calendar runs from April to November, and it has students from ninth through twelfth grade. Students from the school have won Olympic, World Championship, World Cup, National, Collegiate and Junior titles in multiple winter sports.

== Notable alumni ==
- Zoe Atkin, Olympic skiing bronze medallist
- Isabel Atkin, Olympic skiing bronze medallist
- Sam Macuga, ski jumper
- Tallulah Proulx, Olympic skier
- Winston Tang, Olympic skier
