= Christine Mukamutesi =

Rwandan middle-distance runner

Personal information
- Nationality: Rwandan
- Born: 24 December 1983 (age 42)

Sport
- Sport: Middle-distance running
- Event: 800 metres

Christine Mukamutesi (born 24 December 1983) is a Rwandan middle-distance runner. She competed in the women's 800 metres at the 2000 Summer Olympics.
