= Kennedy Kimwetich =

Kenyan middle-distance runner

Kennedy Kimwetich (born 1 January 1973) is a retired Kenyan middle distance runner who specialised in the 800 metres. He reached the final of the 1999 World Championships finishing seventh.

He is the Kenyan record holder in the indoor 1000 metres. This is also the current Commonwealth records.

== Competition record ==
Year	Competition	Venue	Position	Event	Notes
Representing Kenya
1998	Commonwealth Games	Kuala Lumpur, Malaysia	8th	800 m	1:48.13
1998	Commonwealth Games	Kuala Lumpur, Malaysia	9th (h)	4 × 400 m relay	3:05.56
1999	World Indoor Championships	Maebashi, Japan	17th (sf)	800 m	1:50.18
1999	World Championships	Seville, Spain	7th	800 m	1:46.27
1999	All-Africa Games	Johannesburg, South Africa	5th	800 m	1:46.24

== Personal bests ==
Outdoor

- 800 metres – 1:43.03 (Stuttgart 1998)
- 1000 metres – 2:13.56 (Nice 1999)

Indoor

- 800 metres – 1:46.26 (Karlsruhe 2000)
- 1000 metres – 2:15.50 (Stuttgart 2000) NR
