= Direma Banasso =

Togolese middle-distance runner (born 1985)

Personal information
- Nationality: Togolese
- Born: 29 November 1985 (age 40)

Sport
- Sport: Middle-distance running
- Event: 800 metres

Direma Banasso (born 29 November 1985) is a Togolese middle-distance runner. She competed in the women's 800 metres at the 2000 Summer Olympics. She was the first woman to represent Togo at the Olympics.
