= Delfina Cassinda =

Angolan middle-distance runner (born 1980)

Personal information
- Nationality: Angolan
- Born: 6 January 1980 (age 46)

Sport
- Sport: Middle-distance running
- Event: 800 metres

Delfina Cassinda (born 6 January 1980) is an Angolan middle-distance runner. She competed in the women's 800 metres at the 2000 Summer Olympics.
