= Saeed Basweidan =

Yemeni middle-distance runner (born 1977)

Personal information
- Born: 26 June 1977 (age 49)
- Height: 1.60 m (5 ft 3 in)
- Weight: 61 kg (134 lb)

Sport
- Country: Yemen
- Sport: Athletics

Saeed Basweidan (born 26 June 1977) is a Yemeni middle-distance runner who competed internationally for Yemen at the 1996 Summer Olympics.

== Career ==
Basweidan was just 19 years old when he competed in the 800 metres at the 1996 Summer Olympics held in Atlanta, United States, he ran in the final heat in round one and finished sixth out of seven runners beating Greg Rhymer from the British Virgin Islands, but still not quick enough to qualify for the next round.

The following year he transferred to Virginia Commonwealth University, where he still holds the school record for 800 metres indoor (1:49.33), which is also a Yemeni national record.
