= Olga Raspopova =

Russian middle-distance runner

Personal information
- Nationality: Russian
- Born: 27 December 1978 (age 46)

Sport
- Sport: Women's athletics
- Event: 800 metres

Olga Raspopova (born 27 December 1978) is a Russian middle-distance runner. She competed in the women's 800 metres at the 2000 Summer Olympics.
