= Fernando Arlete (distance runner) =

Bissau-Guinean athlete

Personal information
- Nationality: Bissau-Guinean
- Born: Fernando Arlete; 11 October 1968 (age 57)

Sport
- Sport: Middle-distance running
- Event: 800 metres

Fernando Arlete (born 11 October 1968) is a Bissau-Guinean middle-distance runner. Arlete would start the sport while he was young and pursued it further while studying at the Belarusian State Academy of Arts. He would be the highest ranked African athlete in the nation. Internationally, he would represent Guinea-Bissau at the 1995 All-Africa Games, 1996 African Championships in Athletics, and the 1996 Summer Olympics for the nation's debut.

Later on, he would hold sport administration roles such as becoming the vice president of the Guinea-Bissau Olympic Association, president of the Guinea-Bissau Athletes' Commission, and president of the Association of Olympians in Guinea-Bissau.

== Biography ==
Fernando Arlete was born on 11 October 1968. Arlete started athletics when he was young and continued while he studied architecture at the Belarusian State Academy of Arts. From 1988 to 1994, he would be the highest ranked African runner in the nation while studying.

In 1995, he would set a personal best in the 800 metres with a time of 1:59.92. He would compete for Guinea-Bissau at the 1995 All-Africa Games in Harare, Zimbabwe, and the 1996 African Championships in Athletics in Yaoundé, Cameroon. After the Championships, Guinea-Bissau would compete at the 1996 Summer Olympics in Atlanta, United States, making their first appearance. Arlete would compete for the nation, doing so in the men's 800 metres. He would compete in the heats of the event on 28 July against six other athletes. There, he would finish with a time of 2:00.07, placing last; he would not advance further.

Later on, he would hold multiple sport administration roles such as becoming the vice president of the Guinea-Bissau Olympic Association in 2003 and was designated as the president of the Guinea-Bissau Athletes' Commission the following year. In the same year, he would be president of the Association of Olympians in Guinea-Bissau and the president of the Guinea-Bissau Athletes' Commission.
