= Fernando Arlete (sprinter) =

Guinea-Bissauan athlete

Fernando Arlete II (born 5 November 1979) is a Guinea-Bissauan athlete. He competed for Guinea-Bissau at the 2000 Summer Olympics in the men's 100 metres event but did not finish.
