= Jimmy Jean-Joseph =

French middle-distance runner

Jimmy Jean-Joseph (born 15 October 1972 in Saint-Esprit, Martinique) is a former French athlete who specialised in the 800 meters. Jean-Joseph competed at the 1996 Summer Olympics.
