= Johan Botha (runner) =

South African middle distance runner

Medal record

Men's athletics

Representing South Africa

World Indoor Championships
Gold medal – first place	1999 Maebashi	800 m
Silver medal – second place	2001 Lisbon	800 m

Commonwealth Games
Bronze medal – third place	1998 Kuala Lumpur	800 m

Johan Botha (born 10 January 1974) is a South African middle-distance runner who won the gold medal over 800 metres at the World Indoor Championships in Athletics in Maebashi in 1999. In the course of the race he defeated world record holder Wilson Kipketer and Nico Motchebon in a winning time of 1:45.47. In the same season he ran his indoor personal best of 1:45.45 in Stuttgart. At the 2001 World Indoor Championships in Lisbon Botha came close to defending his title but was defeated by future Olympic champion Yuriy Borzakovskiy and won silver.

Outdoors he won a bronze medal at the 1998 Commonwealth Games. He reached the semifinals of the World Championships in 1999 and again at the Olympic Games in 2000. His outdoor personal best was 1:43.91, set in June 1999 in Oslo. Botha also has a personal best of 3:36:30 on the 1500 m, which he ran in the Netherlands during 2000.

== Competition record ==
Year	Competition	Venue	Position	Event	Notes
Representing South Africa
1996	Olympic Games	Atlanta, United States	18th (sf)	800 m	1:48.06
1998	Commonwealth Games	Kuala Lumpur, Malaysia	3rd	800 m	1:44.57
1998	Commonwealth Games	Kuala Lumpur, Malaysia	4th	4 × 400 m relay	3:02.21
1999	World Indoor Championships	Maebashi, Japan	1st	800 m	1:45.47
1999	World Championships	Seville, Spain	23rd (sf)	800 m	1:49.71
1999	All-Africa Games	Johannesburg, South Africa	6th	800 m	1:47.31
2000	Olympic Games	Sydney, Australia	11th (sf)	800 m	1:45.49
2001	World Indoor Championships	Lisbon, Portugal	2nd	800 m	1:46.42
