= Jason Lobo =

British athlete

Personal information
- Nationality: British (English)
- Born: 18 September 1969 (age 56) Blackburn, England

Sport
- Sport: Athletics
- Event: Middle-distance
- Club: Blackburn AC

Jason Patrick Lobo (born 1969), is a former athlete who competed for England.

== Biography ==
Lobo became the British 800 metres champion in 1998 after winning the AAA Championships title at the 1998 AAA Championships.

Lobo represented England in the 800 metres event, at the 1998 Commonwealth Games in Kuala Lumpur, Malaysia.
