= Leopoldina Ross =

Guinea-Bissauan freestyle wrestler

Personal information
- Full name: Leopoldina Ross Davyes
- Nationality: Guinea-Bissauan
- Born: 20 June 1976 (age 50) Bissau, Guinea-Bissau
- Height: 1.58 m (5 ft 2 in)
- Weight: 48 kg (106 lb)

Sport
- Country: Guinea-Bissau
- Style: Freestyle
- Club: Wrestling Club of Sportschool
- Coach: Alberto Pereira
Medal record
Representing Guinea-Bissau
Women's Freestyle wrestling
African Championships
Gold medal – first place	2000 Tunis	46 kg

Leopoldina Ross Davyes (born 20 June 1976 in Bissau) is an amateur Guinea-Bissauan freestyle wrestler, who competed in the women's flyweight category. Ross captured a gold medal in the same division at the 2000 African Wrestling Championships, and later represented Guinea-Bissau at the 2004 Summer Olympics, where she became the nation's flag bearer in the opening ceremony. During her sporting career, she has been training for the Wrestling Club of Sportschool in Bissau under her personal coach Alberto Pereira.

Ross qualified for her Guinea-Bissau squad in the women's 48 kg class at the 2004 Summer Olympics in Athens by receiving a continental berth from the African Championships in Cairo, Egypt. She received two straight losses and no classification points in a preliminary pool match against France's Angélique Berthenet and Mongolia's Tsogtbazaryn Enkhjargal, finishing thirteenth overall out of fourteen wrestlers.

Olympic Games
Preceded by Talata Embalo	Flagbearer for Guinea-Bissau; Athens 2004	Succeeded by Augusto Midana
