= Domingas Togna =

Bissau-Guinean runner

Domingas Embana Togna (born June 14, 1981) is a runner from Guinea-Bissau.

She competed in the marathon race at the 2007 World Championships, without finishing, and then in the 1500 metres at the 2008 Olympic Games, finishing eleventh in the heats and 33rd overall.
