= Guinea-Bissau at the Olympics =

- IOC code: GBS
- NOC: Guinea-Bissau Olympic Committee
- Website: cogb.gw
- Medals: Gold 0 Silver 0 Bronze 0 Total 0

Summer appearances
- 1996; 2000; 2004; 2008; 2012; 2016; 2020; 2024; 2028

Guinea-Bissau has sent athletes to compete in every Summer Olympic Games since 1996, although the nation has never won an Olympic medal. The nation competed at the Winter Olympic Games for the first time in 2026. Its highest finish in the Olympics Games is 7th, by freestyle wrestler Augusto Midana at the Men's Middleweight event at the 2012 Summer Olympics.

The National Olympic Committee was created in 1992 and recognized by the International Olympic Committee in 1995.

== Medal tables ==
=== Medals by Summer Games ===
Games	Athletes	Gold	Silver	Bronze	Total	Rank
1996 Atlanta	3	0	0	0	0	–
2000 Sydney	3	0	0	0	0	–
2004 Athens	3	0	0	0	0	–
2008 Beijing	3	0	0	0	0	–
2012 London	4	0	0	0	0	–
2016 Rio de Janeiro	5	0	0	0	0	–
2020 Tokyo	4	0	0	0	0	–
2024 Paris	6	0	0	0	0	–
2028 Los Angeles	future event					
2032 Brisbane	future event					
Total		0	0	0	0	–

=== Medals by Winter Games ===
Games	Athletes	Gold	Silver	Bronze	Total	Rank
2026 Milano Cortina	1	0	0	0	0	–
2030 French Alps	future event					
2034 Utah	future event					
Total		0	0	0	0	–

== See also ==
- List of flag bearers for Guinea-Bissau at the Olympics
- List of participating nations at the Summer Olympic Games
- List of participating nations at the Winter Olympic Games
