= Philip Kibitok =

Kenyan middle-distance runner

Personal information
- Nationality: Kenyan
- Born: 23 March 1971 (age 55)

Sport
- Sport: Middle-distance running
- Event: 800 metres

Philip Kibitok (born 23 March 1971) is a Kenyan middle-distance runner. He competed in the men's 800 metres at the 1996 Summer Olympics.
