= Frederick Onyancha =

Kenyan middle-distance runner

Medal record

Men's athletics

Representing Kenya

Olympic Games
Bronze medal – third place	1996 Atlanta	800 m

African Championships
Gold medal – first place	1996 Yaoundé	800 m

Frederick ("Fred") Onyancha (born 25 December 1969 in Nyamira) is a Kenyan 800 metres runner who won the bronze medal at the 1996 Summer Olympics in Atlanta in a personal best time of 1:42.79 minutes.
