= Talata Embalo =

Bissau-Guinean sport wrestler

Personal information
- Born: 28 November 1963 (age 62)

Sport
- Country: Guinea-Bissau
- Sport: Wrestling

Talata Embalo (born 28 November 1963) is a Guinea-Bissauan amateur wrestler. He wrestled at the 1996 and 2000 Summer Olympics and did not medal.

Olympic Games
Preceded by First	Flagbearer for Guinea-Bissau; Atlanta 1996; Sydney 2000	Succeeded by Leopoldina Ross
