= Seco Camara =

Athlete from Guinea-Bissau

Personal information
- Nationality: Guinea-Bissau
- Born: 20 April 1995 (age 31)

Sport
- Sport: Track and Field
- Event: 100 m

Seco Camara (born 20 April 1995) is an Olympic sprinter from Guinea-Bissau.

== Career ==
Camara ran a personal best time of 11.33 seconds when he competed at the Athletics at the 2020 Summer Olympics – Men's 100 metres in Tokyo.

He competed in the 100 metres at the 2024 Paris Olympics.
