= Andrew Hart (runner) =

British athlete

Andy Hart
Personal information
- Nationality: British (English)
- Born: 13 September 1969 (age 57) Warwick, England
- Height: 180 cm (5 ft 11 in)
- Weight: 68 kg (150 lb)

Sport
- Sport: Athletics
- Event: Middle-distance
- Club: Coventry Godiva Harriers

Andrew Hart (born 13 September 1969) is an English male former middle-distance runner who specialised in the 800 metres and competed at the 2000 Summer Olympics.

== Biography ==
Hart ran at the 1997 World Championships in Athletics and his personal best time was 1:45.71 minutes, achieved when he placed fifth representing England at the 1998 Commonwealth Games, his most prestigious championship achievement.

At the 2000 Olympic Games in Sydney, he represented Great Britain in the 800 metres event.

At national level, he was the winner of the 800 m at the 1997 British Athletics Championships.

He is currently a physical education teacher at The Crypt School, Gloucester. The career has gone uphill.
