= Athletics at the 1996 Summer Olympics =

Athletics at the Games of the XXVI Olympiad
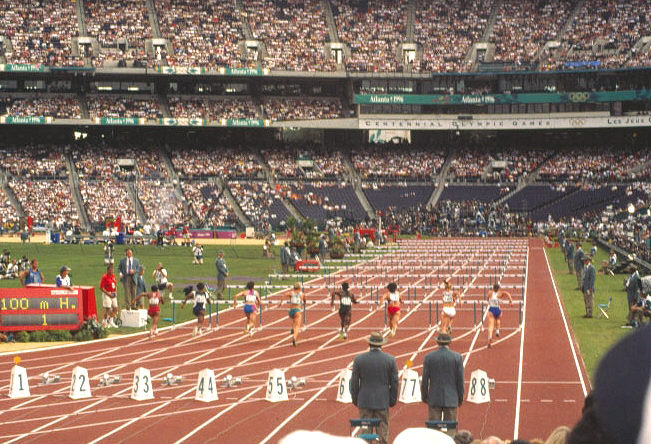
- Venue: Centennial Olympic Stadium
- Dates: July 26 August 3, 1996
- No. of events: 44
- Competitors: 2053 from 191 nations

At the 1996 Summer Olympics in Atlanta, 44 events in athletics were contested. There were a total number of 2053 participating athletes from 191 countries.

A total of two world records and 14 Olympic records were set during the competition.

== Medal winners ==
=== Men ===
Event	Gold		Silver		Bronze	
100 metres	Donovan Bailey; Canada	9.84 (WR)	Frankie Fredericks; Namibia	9.89	Ato Boldon; Trinidad and Tobago	9.90
200 metres	Michael Johnson; United States	19.32 (WR)	Frankie Fredericks; Namibia	19.68 (AR)	Ato Boldon; Trinidad and Tobago	19.80
400 metres	Michael Johnson; United States	43.49 (OR)	Roger Black; Great Britain	44.41	Davis Kamoga; Uganda	44.53
800 metres	Vebjørn Rodal; Norway	1:42.58 (OR)	Hezekiél Sepeng; South Africa	1:42.74	Fred Onyancha; Kenya	1:42.79
1500 metres	Noureddine Morceli; Algeria	3:35.78	Fermín Cacho; Spain	3:36.40	Stephen Kipkorir; Kenya	3:36.72
5000 metres	Vénuste Niyongabo; Burundi	13:07.96	Paul Bitok; Kenya	13:08.16	Khalid Boulami; Morocco	13:08.37
10,000 metres	Haile Gebrselassie; Ethiopia	27:07.34 (OR)	Paul Tergat; Kenya	27:08.17	Salah Hissou; Morocco	27:24.67
110 metres hurdles	Allen Johnson; United States	12.95 (OR)	Mark Crear; United States	13.09	Florian Schwarthoff; Germany	13.17
400 metres hurdles	Derrick Adkins; United States	47.54	Samuel Matete; Zambia	47.78	Calvin Davis; United States	47.96
3000 metres steeplechase	Joseph Keter; Kenya	8:07.12	Moses Kiptanui; Kenya	8:08.33	Alessandro Lambruschini; Italy	8:11.28
4 × 100 metres relay	Canada; Robert Esmie; Glenroy Gilbert; Bruny Surin; Donovan Bailey; Carlton Chambers*	37.69	United States; Jon Drummond; Tim Harden; Michael Marsh; Dennis Mitchell; Tim Montgomery*	38.05	Brazil; Arnaldo da Silva; Robson da Silva; Édson Ribeiro; André da Silva	38.41
4 × 400 metres relay	United States; LaMont Smith; Alvin Harrison; Derek Mills; Anthuan Maybank; Jason Rouser*	2:55.99	Great Britain; Iwan Thomas; Jamie Baulch; Mark Richardson; Roger Black; Mark Hylton*; Du'aine Ladejo*	2:56.60	Jamaica; Michael McDonald; Greg Haughton; Roxbert Martin; Davian Clarke; Dennis Blake*; Garth Robinson*	2:59.42
Marathon	Josia Thugwane; South Africa	2:12:36	Lee Bong-Ju; South Korea	2:12:39	Erick Wainaina; Kenya	2:12:44
20 kilometres walk	Jefferson Pérez; Ecuador	1:20:07	Ilya Markov; Russia	1:20:16	Bernardo Segura; Mexico	1:20:23
50 kilometres walk	Robert Korzeniowski; Poland	3:43:30	Mikhail Shchennikov; Russia	3:43:36	Valentí Massana; Spain	3:44:19
High jump	Charles Austin; United States	2.39 m (OR)	Artur Partyka; Poland	2.37 m	Steve Smith; Great Britain	2.35 m
Pole vault	Jean Galfione; France	5.92 m	Igor Trandenkov; Russia	5.92 m	Andrei Tivontchik; Germany	5.92 m
Long jump	Carl Lewis; United States	8.50 m	James Beckford; Jamaica	8.29 m	Joe Greene; United States	8.24 m
Triple jump	Kenny Harrison; United States	18.09 m (OR)	Jonathan Edwards; Great Britain	17.88 m	Yoelbi Quesada; Cuba	17.44 m
Shot put	Randy Barnes; United States	21.62 m	John Godina; United States	20.79 m	Oleksandr Bagach; Ukraine	20.75 m
Discus throw	Lars Riedel; Germany	69.40 m	Vladimir Dubrovshchik; Belarus	66.60 m	Vasiliy Kaptyukh; Belarus	65.80 m
Hammer throw	Balázs Kiss; Hungary	81.24 m	Lance Deal; United States	81.12 m	Oleksandr Krykun; Ukraine	80.02 m
Javelin throw	Jan Železný; Czech Republic	88.16 m	Steve Backley; Great Britain	87.44 m	Seppo Räty; Finland	86.98 m
Decathlon	Dan O'Brien; United States	8824 pts	Frank Busemann; Germany	8706 pts	Tomáš Dvořák; Czech Republic	8664 pts

* Athletes who participated in the heats only and received medals.

=== Women ===
Games	Gold		Silver		Bronze	
100 metres	Gail Devers; United States	10.94	Merlene Ottey; Jamaica	10.94	Gwen Torrence; United States	10.96
200 metres	Marie-José Pérec; France	22.12	Merlene Ottey; Jamaica	22.24	Mary Onyali; Nigeria	22.38
400 metres	Marie-José Pérec; France	48.25 (OR)	Cathy Freeman; Australia	48.63	Falilat Ogunkoya; Nigeria	49.10
800 metres	Svetlana Masterkova; Russia	1:57.73	Ana Fidelia Quirot; Cuba	1:58.11	Maria de Lurdes Mutola; Mozambique	1:58.71
1500 metres	Svetlana Masterkova; Russia	4:00.83	Gabriela Szabo; Romania	4:01.54	Theresia Kiesl; Austria	4:03.02 (NR)
5000 metres	Wang Junxia; China	14:59.88 (OR)	Pauline Konga; Kenya	15:03.49	Roberta Brunet; Italy	15:07.52
10,000 metres	Fernanda Ribeiro; Portugal	31:01.63 (OR)	Wang Junxia; China	31:02.59	Gete Wami; Ethiopia	31:06.65
100 metres hurdles	Ludmila Engquist; Sweden	12.58	Brigita Bukovec; Slovenia	12.59	Patricia Girard; France	12.65
400 metres hurdles	Deon Hemmings; Jamaica	52.82 (OR)	Kim Batten; United States	53.08	Tonja Buford-Bailey; United States	53.22
4 × 100 metres relay	United States; Chryste Gaines; Gail Devers; Inger Miller; Gwen Torrence; Carlette Guidry*	41.95	Bahamas; Eldece Clarke; Chandra Sturrup; Savatheda Fynes; Pauline Davis-Thompson; Debbie Ferguson*	42.14	Jamaica; Michelle Freeman; Juliet Cuthbert; Nikole Mitchell; Merlene Ottey; Gillian Russell*; Andria Lloyd*	42.24
4 × 400 metres relay	United States; Rochelle Stevens; Maicel Malone-Wallace; Kim Graham; Jearl Miles; Linetta Wilson*	3:20.91	Nigeria; Olabisi Afolabi; Fatima Yusuf; Charity Opara; Falilat Ogunkoya	3:21.04	Germany; Uta Rohländer; Linda Kisabaka; Anja Rücker; Grit Breuer	3:21.14
Marathon	Fatuma Roba; Ethiopia	2:26:05	Valentina Yegorova; Russia	2:28:05	Yuko Arimori; Japan	2:28:39
10 kilometres walk	Yelena Nikolayeva; Russia	41:49 (OR)	Elisabetta Perrone; Italy	42:12	Wang Yan; China	42:19
High jump	Stefka Kostadinova; Bulgaria	2.05 m	Niki Bakoyianni; Greece	2.03 m	Inha Babakova; Ukraine	2.01 m
Long jump	Chioma Ajunwa; Nigeria	7.12 m	Fiona May; Italy	7.02 m	Jackie Joyner-Kersee; United States	7.00 m
Triple jump	Inessa Kravets; Ukraine	15.33 m (OR)	Inna Lasovskaya; Russia	14.98 m	Šárka Kašpárková; Czech Republic	14.98 m
Shot put	Astrid Kumbernuss; Germany	20.56 m	Sui Xinmei; China	19.88 m	Irina Khudoroshkina; Russia	19.35 m
Discus throw	Ilke Wyludda; Germany	69.66 m	Natalya Sadova; Russia	66.48 m	Ellina Zvereva; Belarus	65.64 m
Javelin throw	Heli Rantanen; Finland	67.94 m	Louise McPaul; Australia	65.54 m	Trine Hattestad; Norway	64.98 m
Heptathlon	Ghada Shouaa; Syria	6780 pts	Natallia Sazanovich; Belarus	6563 pts	Denise Lewis; Great Britain	6489 pts

* Athletes who participated in the heats only and received medals.

== Olympic and world records broken ==
=== Men ===
Note: Any world record is also an Olympic record

Event	Date	Round	Name	Nationality	Time	Record
100 m	27 July	Final	Donovan Bailey	Canada	9.84	WR
200 m	29 July	Final	Michael Johnson	United States	19.32	WR
400 m	27 July	Final	Michael Johnson	United States	43.49	OR
800 m	30 July	Final	Vebjørn Rodal	Norway	1:42.58	OR
10,000 m	26 July	Final	Haile Gebrselassie	Ethiopia	27:07.34	OR
110 m hurdles	28 July	Final	Allen Johnson	United States	12.95	OR
High jump	30 July	Final	Charles Austin	United States	2.39	OR
Pole vault	1 August	Final	Jean Galfione	United States	5.92	OR
Triple jump	2 August	Final	Kenny Harrison	United States	18.09	OR

=== Women ===
Event	Date	Round	Name	Nationality	Time	Record
400 m	28 July	Final	Marie-José Pérec	France	48.26	OR
5000 m	29 July	Final	Wang Junxia	China	14:59.88	OR
400 m hurdles	2 August	Final	Deon Hemmings	Jamaica	52.82	OR
10 km race walk	27 July	Final	Yelena Nikolayeva	Russia	41:49	OR
Triple jump	30 July	Final	Inessa Kravets	Ukraine	15.33	OR

== Medal table ==
Rank	Nation	Gold	Silver	Bronze	Total
1	United States	13	5	5	23
2	Russia	3	6	1	10
3	Germany	3	1	3	7
4	France	3	0	1	4
5	Ethiopia	2	0	1	3
6	Canada	2	0	0	2
7	Kenya	1	4	3	8
8	Jamaica	1	3	2	6
9	China	1	2	1	4
10	Nigeria	1	1	2	4
11	Poland	1	1	0	2
11	South Africa	1	1	0	2
13	Ukraine	1	0	3	4
14	Czech Republic	1	0	2	3
15	Finland	1	0	1	2
15	Norway	1	0	1	2
17	Algeria	1	0	0	1
17	Bulgaria	1	0	0	1
17	Burundi	1	0	0	1
17	Ecuador	1	0	0	1
17	Hungary	1	0	0	1
17	Portugal	1	0	0	1
17	Sweden	1	0	0	1
17	Syria	1	0	0	1
25	Great Britain	0	4	2	6
26	Belarus	0	2	2	4
26	Italy	0	2	2	4
28	Australia	0	2	0	2
28	Namibia	0	2	0	2
30	Cuba	0	1	1	2
30	Spain	0	1	1	2
32	Bahamas	0	1	0	1
32	Greece	0	1	0	1
32	Romania	0	1	0	1
32	Slovenia	0	1	0	1
32	South Korea	0	1	0	1
32	Zambia	0	1	0	1
38	Morocco	0	0	2	2
38	Trinidad and Tobago	0	0	2	2
40	Austria	0	0	1	1
40	Brazil	0	0	1	1
40	Japan	0	0	1	1
40	Mexico	0	0	1	1
40	Mozambique	0	0	1	1
40	Uganda	0	0	1	1
Totals (45 entries)		44	44	44	132

== Participating nations ==
A total of 190 nations participated in the different Athletics events at the 1996 Summer Olympics.

- Afghanistan (2 athletes)
- Albania (2)
- Algeria (8)
- American Samoa (2)
- Andorra (1)
- Angola (2)
- Antigua and Barbuda (8)
- Argentina (8)
- Armenia (2)
- Aruba (1)
- Australia (60)
- Austria (11)
- Azerbaijan (4)
- Bahamas (20)
- Bahrain (1)
- Bangladesh (2)
- Barbados (4)
- Belarus (34)
- Belgium (12)
- Belize (4)
- Benin (5)
- Bermuda (3)
- Bolivia (3)
- Bosnia and Herzegovina (2)
- Botswana (6)
- Brazil (40)
- British Virgin Islands (6)
- Bulgaria (17)
- Burkina Faso (4)
- Burundi (7)
- Cambodia (2)
- Cameroon (8)
- Canada (39)
- Cape Verde (3)
- Cayman Islands (1)
- Central African Republic (5)
- Chad (4)
- Chile (4)
- China (31)
- Chinese Taipei (7)
- Colombia (13)
- Comoros (4)
- Republic of the Congo (2)
- Cook Islands (1)
- Costa Rica (2)
- Ivory Coast (5)
- Croatia (3)
- Cuba (46)
- Cyprus (8)
- Czech Republic (23)
- Denmark (7)
- Zaire (2)
- Djibouti (3)
- Dominica (5)
- Dominican Republic (3)
- Ecuador (4)
- El Salvador (2)
- Equatorial Guinea (5)
- Estonia (12)
- Ethiopia (16)
- Fiji (7)
- Finland (26)
- France (49)
- Gabon (4)
- The Gambia (9)
- Georgia (2)
- Germany (85)
- Ghana (15)
- Great Britain (77)
- Greece (25)
- Grenada (5)
- Guam (2)
- Guatemala (6)
- Guinea (4)
- Guinea-Bissau (2)
- Guyana (6)
- Haiti (3)
- Honduras (1)
- Hong Kong (1)
- Hungary (22)
- Iceland (3)
- India (6)
- Indonesia (1)
- Iran (1)
- Iraq (1)
- Ireland (24)
- Israel (4)
- Italy (50)
- Jamaica (38)
- Japan (32)
- Jordan (2)
- Kazakhstan (18)
- Kenya (43)
- Kuwait (1)
- Kyrgyzstan (6)
- Laos (5)
- Latvia (16)
- Lesotho (9)
- Liberia (5)
- Libya (4)
- Liechtenstein (1)
- Lithuania (14)
- Luxembourg (1)
- Madagascar (6)
- Malaysia (3)
- Malawi (2)
- Maldives (5)
- Mali (3)
- Malta (2)
- Mauritania (4)
- Mauritius (12)
- Mexico (15)
- Moldova (7)
- Mongolia (2)
- Morocco (17)
- Mozambique (1)
- Myanmar (2)
- Namibia (3)
- Nepal (2)
- Netherlands (10)
- Netherlands Antilles (1)
- New Zealand (18)
- Nicaragua (2)
- Niger (3)
- Nigeria (32)
- North Korea (4)
- Norway (13)
- Oman (1)
- Pakistan (2)
- Palestine (1)
- Panama (1)
- Papua New Guinea (6)
- Paraguay (2)
- Peru (5)
- Philippines (2)
- Poland (23)
- Portugal (30)
- Puerto Rico (5)
- Qatar (9)
- Romania (25)
- Russia (85)
- Rwanda (4)
- Saint Kitts and Nevis (10)
- Saint Lucia (5)
- Saint Vincent and the Grenadines (8)
- Western Samoa (2)
- San Marino (1)
- São Tomé and Príncipe (2)
- Saudi Arabia (9)
- Senegal (7)
- FR Yugoslavia (8)
- Seychelles (2)
- Sierra Leone (12)
- Singapore (2)
- Slovakia (14)
- Slovenia (10)
- Solomon Islands (3)
- Somalia (4)
- South Africa (22)
- South Korea (17)
- Spain (56)
- Sri Lanka (6)
- Sudan (3)
- Suriname (2)
- Swaziland (4)
- Sweden (17)
- Switzerland (23)
- Syria (1)
- Tanzania (5)
- Tajikistan (1)
- Thailand (8)
- Togo (5)
- Tonga (2)
- Trinidad and Tobago (6)
- Tunisia (6)
- Turkey (3)
- Turkmenistan (1)
- Uganda (4)
- Ukraine (43)
- United Arab Emirates (1)
- United States (121)
- Uruguay (2)
- Uzbekistan (12)
- Vanuatu (4)
- Venezuela (4)
- Vietnam (2)
- Virgin Islands (7)
- Yemen (3)
- Zambia (4)
- Zimbabwe (6)
