= Bissau-Guinean nationality law =

Bissau-Guinean Nationality Regulation

National Assembly of Guinea-Bissau
- Long title: Regulamento da nacionalidade, Decreto Lei n.º 6/2011 de 23 de Fevereiro
- Enacted by: Government of Guinea-Bissau
- Status: Current legislation

The nationality law of Guinea-Bissau is regulated by the country's constitution, as amended; the Bissau-Guinean Nationality Regulation, and its revisions; and various international agreements to which the country is a signatory. These laws determine who is, or is eligible to be, a national of Guinea-Bissau. The legal means to acquire nationality, formal legal membership in a nation, differ from the domestic relationship of rights and obligations between a national and the nation, known as citizenship. Nationality describes the relationship of an individual to the state under international law, whereas citizenship is the domestic relationship of an individual within the nation. Bissau-Guinean nationality is typically obtained under the principle of jus soli, i.e. by birth in Guinea-Bissau, or jus sanguinis, i.e. by birth in Guinea-Bissau or abroad to parents with Bissau-Guinean nationality. It can be granted to persons with an affiliation to the country, or to a permanent resident who has lived in the country for a given period of time through naturalization.

== Acquisition of nationality ==
Nationality can be obtained in Guinea-Bissau at birth or later in life through naturalization.

=== By birth ===
Typically, in Guinea-Bissau, a combination of jus sanguinis and jus soli are used to determine nationality at birth. Those who are eligible include:

- Persons born in Guinea-Bissau who have a parent who is a national;
- Persons born abroad to a Bissau-Guinean must register the birth with authorities and follow an administrative process to obtain nationality;
- Foundlings or orphans, with no discernible evidence as to the nationality or identity of its parents; or
- Persons born in Guinea-Bissau who would otherwise be stateless.

=== By naturalization ===
Naturalization can be granted to persons who have resided in the territory for a sufficient period of time to confirm they understand the customs and traditions of Guinea-Bissau. Bissau-Guinean nationality may be acquired through application for persons who have reached the age of majority and have legal capacity to the Ministry responsible for immigration. They must provide documentation to confirm lack of a serious criminal record, lack of political service to a government or foreign military, and no actions which would impinge state security. Applicants must verify residency of a minimum of six years, which can be waived in the event of substantial contributions towards the development of the country. Besides foreigners meeting the criteria, other persons who may apply for naturalization include:

- The spouse of a Bissau-Guinean national after three years of marriage and a one-year residency;
- Children may be included in the parental application for naturalization in Guinea-Bissau;
- Adoptees of Bissau-Guinean nationals automatically acquire nationality upon completion of a legal adoption; or
- Persons who have provided substantial contributions to the development of the country or to its independence are not required to meet a residency requirement.

== Loss of nationality ==
Bissau-Guinean nationals can renounce their nationality pending approval by the state. Bissau-Guineans of origin may not be denaturalized. Naturalized persons may lose their nationality in Guinea-Bissau for disloyalty to the state; committing crimes against the state or state security; or for fraud, misrepresentation, or concealment in a naturalization petition. Persons who previously had nationality and wish to repatriate if they voluntarily lost their status must establish residency and request reinstatement.

== Dual nationality ==
Dual nationality has been allowed in some circumstances in Guinea-Bissau since 1975. Though typically it was not allowed at independence for persons to acquire a second nationality, persons born with dual nationality and persons who naturalized were not required to renounce other nationality. Under the 1992 law conditional dual nationality was allowed, for example for persons who had emigrated for economic reasons, but in 2010, dual nationality was approved without restriction. To qualify to serve as the president of Guinea-Bissau, a candidate may not have dual nationality, must be Bissau-Guinean by origin, and must have parents who were also Bissau-Guinean by origin.

== History ==
=== African empires and European contact (1250–1879) ===
Around 1250, the Kaabu Kingdom was established by Tiramakhan Traore, a general in service to the Mali Empire. It dominated the chiefdoms in the northeastern part of what is now Guinea-Bissau and extended into Senegal. The kingdom supplied gold, salt and slaves to the Mali and later the Portuguese. The Balanta and Bijagó people resisted domination by the Kaabu Kingdom. The Casa da Guiné was founded in 1443 in Lisbon as a private venture, licensed by Prince Henry the Navigator to explore the potential of Christianization and commerce in West Africa. Their goal was to establish permanent relationships with the African kingdoms in an effort to work together in trading ventures. The fort they founded that year on Arguin Island allowed the access the coast from the Bay of Arguin to the Gulf of Guinea. In 1446, Nuño Tristão, a Portuguese explorer, sailed through the Bissagos Islands and waterways of the region. He was followed in 1456 by Diogo Gomes who also explored rivers in the area. Portuguese traders first settled in the coastal regions, paying tribute to the local chieftains in exchange for being able to settle in their lands. Their presence marked the beginning of a shift away from Arab trans-Saharan trade toward European merchants.

Kaabu took advantage of conflict between the Mali and Songhai Empires beginning in the period from 1461 and gained independence in 1537. After first settling on the coasts by the sixteenth century, the Portuguese built trading posts along the rivers, and eventually moved inland. With the rise of the Imamate of Futa Jallon, founded in 1727, Fula people, who had been heavily taxed by Kaabu began a series of wars, fueled by religion and commerce. The Fula obtained weapons from the Portuguese, who used the conflicts to gain influence, divide the Africans, and build alliances with various chieftains. Abolition of the slave trade in the mid-nineteenth century, increased competition to control commerce. In 1867, troops from Futa Jallon defeated the Kaabu Kingdom and forced their leader to surrender, but they were unable to consolidate their rule in the area. A series of slave rebellions, caused because the leaders of the Imamate had not compensated their participation in subduing the Kaabu Kingdom, began in the 1870s. The Portuguese granted asylum to the rebels and used them to assist the Portuguese in gaining control over the indigenous populations.

=== Portuguese colony (1879–1975) ===
In 1879, Portuguese Guinea was formally established as a Portuguese colony. Under the Ordinances of Manuel I (Portuguese: Ordenações Manuelinas), compiled by Portugal in 1521, courts were given leeway to interpret common law and local custom in the territories without established High Courts. Nationals were defined as those born in Portuguese territory and leaving the territory without permission of the sovereign was grounds for denaturalization. In 1603, the Ordinances of Philip I (Portuguese: Ordenações Filipinas) established that Portuguese nationals were children born on the Iberian Peninsula or adjacent islands, Brazil, or to an official in service to the crown in the Portuguese possessions of Africa or Asia, whose father was a native of Portugal, or whose mother was a native of Portugal and whose father was a foreigner who had established domicile in Portugal for a minimum of ten years. Those who were not in service to the crown in the colonies (except Brazil) were not considered to be Portuguese. A child could not derive nationality directly from its mother unless it was illegitimate.

The first Constitution of Portugal, drafted in 1822, defined subjects of the Portuguese crown as the children of a male, native to any of the territories of the kingdom. The nationality scheme laid out in 1603 remained mostly unchanged except for some clarifications, such as legitimate children of a Portuguese father or illegitimate children of a Portuguese mother born abroad could be nationals if they resided in Portugal and children born to a Portuguese mother and foreign father could only derive Portuguese nationality upon reaching their majority and requesting it. Two new provisions included that foundlings discovered on Portuguese soil were considered nationals, as were freedmen. Naturalization was only available to foreign men who married Portuguese women, and only if they had investments in the country or provided service to the crown. Denaturalization resulted from service to, or receiving benefits from, a foreign government, or obtaining other nationality. A new constitution was adopted in 1826 (which was in force from 1826 to 1828, 1834 to 1836, and 1842 to 1910) which granted nationality to anyone born on Portuguese soil. Birth by descent was accepted as establishing nationality, as long as the father lived in Portugal or was abroad in service to the monarch. Provisions stipulated that only illegitimate children could derive nationality from their mother and established that a nationality law was to define provisions for naturalization.

The new nationality code was promulgated as the Decree of 22 October 1836, which established that grounds for naturalization included having reached majority, demonstrating adequate means of self-support, and having a minimum of two years residency, which could be waived if one had Portuguese ancestry. The Civil Code of 1867 reiterated similar nationality requirements to those that had previously been in effect, with the exception that a foreign woman, upon marriage to a Portuguese husband, automatically acquired Portuguese nationality. It also provided that Portuguese women who married foreigners lost their nationality, unless they would become stateless, and could not reacquire Portuguese status unless the marriage terminated and she lived in Portugal. It retained the provisions of the 1836 Decree for naturalization but increased residency to three years and added stipulations that applicants must have completed their military duties to their country of origin and that they have no criminal record. The Indigenous Code (Portuguese: código indígenato) of 1899, which applied to all other Portuguese colonies, was inapplicable in Cape Verde and São Tomé and Príncipe. The code categorized the population of Portuguese Guinea into natives and foreigners, as well as those who lived traditionally and those who lived under the rule of law. Natives of Portuguese Guinea who followed custom, were nationals without the civil and political rights of Portuguese citizenship, while those who had assimilated to Portuguese culture could become nationals with citizenship benefits. Assimilation policies were ineffective in Portuguese Guinea and Portuguese administrators employed Cape Verdean elites in an effort to improve Guinean literacy.

The nationality requirements remained stable and did not significantly change again until 1959, when a new Nationality Law (Lei n.º 2098), granted Portuguese nationality to anyone born in Portuguese Guinea, unless the parents were foreign diplomats. Married women continued to derive their nationality from their husband, with the exception that a woman could retain her nationality of origin if she specifically declared she did not want to be Portuguese and could prove that her country of origin allowed retention of her nationality after marriage. In 1961, in response to a press for independence throughout Africa, the Portuguese government abolished the Indigenous Code. An armed liberation struggle began in 1963, led by the Partido Africano para a Independência da Guiné e Cabo Verde (African Party for the Independence of Guinea and Cape Verde), who were supplied arms by Soviet allies. By 1968, the rebels controlled nearly two-thirds of the country and independence was declared on 24 September 1973. Within months, over seventy other nations had recognized the country, Portugal recognized their independence on 26 August 1974, and Guinea-Bissau was admitted to the United Nations on 17 September 1974.

After the collapse of the Estado Novo dictatorship in Portugal in 1974 and following a lengthy struggle for independence of the colonies, Portugal agreed to begin the process of decolonization. By the Decree of 25 April 1974, the Portuguese Parliament created the African countries of Angola, Cape Verde, Guinea-Bissau, Mozambique, and São Tomé e Principe. In an attempt to settle the nationality question of those in the new countries, Portugal promulgated Decree-Law 308/75 on 24 June 1975. Under its terms, the legislation assumed that Bissau-Guineans and others born in the colonies would become nationals of the new countries if they did not declare a preference to retain their Portuguese nationality. It proclaimed that those who would not lose Portuguese nationality at independence included only persons born in Portugal but living abroad and persons born abroad in the territory but who had established long-term ties with Portuguese culture by living in Portugal. No option was offered to other Portuguese nationals to retain their status and the automatic loss of nationality left many former colonial nationals stateless.

=== Post-independence (1975–present) ===
Initial plans of the Partido Africano para a Independência da Guiné e Cabo Verde were to create a singular state for Guinea-Bissau and Cape Verde and a temporary government was established. On 5 July 1975, Cape Verde's independence was proclaimed and the Law for the Political Organization of the State was adopted, as a preliminary constitution. The first nationality law adopted in Guinea-Bissau (N°. 1, 4 May 1976) provided for equality of parents to pass on their nationality to their children and for spouses to derive Bissau-Guinean nationality upon marriage. It also had provisions to allow Cape Verdeans, as did the Cape Verdean nationality law allow Bissau-Guineans, mutual access to nationality. Though typically it was forbidden for dual nationality to voluntarily be acquired, the 1976 act allowed persons born with multiple status or naturalized persons to keep their other nationality. After the 1980 Guinea-Bissau coup d'état, the union of the two states was abandoned. A new constitution was adopted in 1984 and on 15 February an amendment to the nationality law (N°. 1/84) revoking the right of Cape Verdeans to Bissau-Guinean nationality was passed. (Note: The Official Bulletin states articles five and eleven of the 1976 law are revoked. ("Revoga a Base V. e a Base XI da Lei no. 1/76 de 4 de Maio") Article 5 of the 1976 law, provided nationality to Cape Verdeans ("De l'acquisition de la nationalité par un citoyen cap-verdien") and article 11 specified that Cape Verdeans were to be considered Guineans of origin ("La nationalité guinéenne acquise aux termes du chapitre 5 a pour conséquence les mêmes effets que la nationalité d'origine")) Under the 1992 revision of the nationality law (N°. 2, 6 April 1992), conditional dual nationality was allowed, for example for persons who had emigrated for economic reasons. In 2010 (N°. 6, 21 June 2010), dual nationality was approved without restriction. In 2011, the Guinea-Bissau Nationality Regulation was redrafted to rectify the issue that the 1992 law had never been officially published.
