= Anhel Cape =

Guinea-Bissauan athlete (born 1978)

Anhel Alberta Cape (born 14 May 1978) is an athlete who competed for Guinea-Bissau at the 2000 Summer Olympics and the 2004 Summer Olympics in the 800m races. In 2000, she finished seventh in her heat and failed to advance. In 2004, she did not finish her heat. She made her Olympic debut in 2000 inaugurating female Guinea-Bissau participation.
