= Savieri Ngidhi =

Zimbabwean middle-distance runner

Savieri Ngidhi Msipa (born March 2, 1968) is a retired Zimbabwean middle-distance runner.

Ngidhi is from Bulawayo, Zimbabwe, where he competed for the athletics club sponsored by Wankie Colliery Company. He earned a two-year scholarship to Blinn College to compete in the NJCAA in 1991. After winning NJCAA national titles in the 800 m, he transferred to Abilene Christian University, where he competed in the NCAA.

== Achievements ==
- 1999 African Southern Region Championships - gold medal (1500 m)
- 1999 IAAF World Indoor Championships - sixth place (800 m)
- 1995 All-Africa Games - bronze medal (800 m)
- 1995 Penn Relays 4 × 800 m Champion-Peter Engelbrecht (RSA)-1:49.70, Ozzie Mdziniso (SWZ)-1:49.70, Thomas Korir (KEN)-1:49.50, Savieri Nghidi (ZIM)-1:45.90
- 1995 Penn Relays Sprint Medley Relay Champion - Joseph Styles, Kevin Dilworth, Robert Guy, Savieri Ngidhi
- 1995 NCAA Division II Champion Outdoor 800 m and 1500 m
- 1995 NCAA Division II Indoor Champion 800 m and 1500 m
- 1994 NCAA Division II Champion Outdoor 800 m and 1500 m
- 1994 NCAA Division II Indoor Champion 800 m and 1500 m
- 1994 Commonwealth Games - bronze medal (800 m)
- 1990 African Zone VI Championships - gold medal (800 m)
- 1990 African Zone VI Championships - gold medal (1500 m)
