= Guinea-Bissau Olympic Committee =

National Olympic Committee

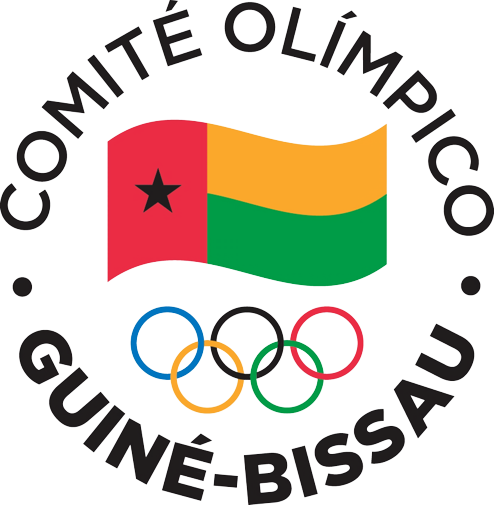
- Country: Guinea-Bissau
- [[|]]
- Code: GBS
- Recognized: 1995
- Continental Association: ANOCA
- Headquarters: Bissau, Guinea-Bissau
- President: Sérgio Mané
- Secretary General: Eugénio de Oliveira Lopes
- Website: cogb.gw

The Guinea-Bissau Olympic Committee (Portuguese: Comité Olímpico da Guiné-Bissau) (IOC code: GBS) is the National Olympic Committee representing Guinea-Bissau.

== See also ==
- Guinea-Bissau at the Olympics
