= Athletics at the 2007 All-Africa Games – Men's 800 metres =

The men's 800 metres at the 2007 All-Africa Games were held on July 18–20.

== Medalists ==
Gold	Silver	Bronze
Abubakar Kaki; Sudan	Mbulaeni Mulaudzi; South Africa	Justus Koech; Kenya

== Results ==
=== Heats ===
Qualification: First 3 of each heat (Q) and the next 4 fastest (q) qualified for the semifinals.

Rank	Heat	Name	Nationality	Time	Notes
1	3	Abubaker Kaki	Sudan	1:47.08	Q
2	3	Mbulaeni Mulaudzi	South Africa	1:47.39	Q
3	4	Nabil Madi	Algeria	1:47.57	Q
4	3	Abraham Chepkirwok	Uganda	1:47.62	Q
5	4	Ismael Kombich	Kenya	1:48.19	Q
6	3	Henok Legesse	Ethiopia	1:48.43	q, PB
7	4	Mahamoud Farah	Djibouti	1:48.92	Q
8	2	Abdoulaye Wagne	Senegal	1:49.04	Q
9	2	Justus Koech	Kenya	1:49.09	Q
10	2	Nadjim Manseur	Algeria	1:49.44	Q
11	1	Richard Kiplagat	Kenya	1:49.65	Q
12	4	Samson Ngoepe	South Africa	1:49.66	q
13	2	Jimmy Adar	Uganda	1:49.92	q
14	1	Glody Dube	Botswana	1:50.30	Q
15	2	Eshetu Zewde	Ethiopia	1:50.37	q, SB
16	2	Prince Mumba	Zambia	1:50.37	
17	4	Abdu Adi Abdella	Eritrea	1:50.43	
18	1	William Filip	Sudan	1:50.57	Q
19	4	Ebrima Ceesay	Gambia	1:50.65	PB
20	4	Mogomotsi Gadsego	Botswana	1:50.94	SB
21	3	Onalenna Oabona	Botswana	1:50.98	
22	1	Helio Furno	Mozambique	1:51.11	
22	2	Aboubakar Gatroni	Libya	1:51.11	SB
24	4	Severin Sahinkuye	Burundi	1:51.44	PB
25	2	Mamana Salissau	Niger	1:52.19	NJR
26	1	Bakary Jabbie	Gambia	1:52.59	PB
27	2	Chauncy Master	Malawi	1:53.30	
28	1	Blaise de Campos	Benin	1:54.62	PB
29	3	Godeffrey Rutayisire	Rwanda	1:55.82	
30	3	Brahim Ouaddai	Chad	1:57.62	
31	3	Geramias da Silva	Guinea-Bissau	1:58.85	
32	1	German Edu-Monsuy	Equatorial Guinea	2:00.31	
33	3	Souleimone Chabal	Mauritania	2:03.82	
	1	Tarek Boukensa	Algeria	DNS	

=== Semifinals ===
Qualification: First 3 of each semifinal (Q) and the next 2 fastest (q) qualified for the final.

Rank	Heat	Name	Nationality	Time	Notes
1	2	Abubaker Kaki	Sudan	1:46.17	Q
2	2	Nabil Madi	Algeria	1:46.73	Q
3	2	Abdoulaye Wagne	Senegal	1:46.84	Q
4	2	Ismael Kombich	Kenya	1:47.17	q
5	2	Mahamoud Farah	Djibouti	1:47.53	q, NR
6	1	Justus Koech	Kenya	1:48.34	Q
7	2	Henok Legesse	Ethiopia	1:48.44	
8	1	Mbulaeni Mulaudzi	South Africa	1:48.45	Q
9	1	Abraham Chepkirwok	Uganda	1:48.58	Q
10	1	Richard Kiplagat	Kenya	1:49.12	
11	1	Glody Dube	Botswana	1:49.71	
12	2	Samson Ngoepe	South Africa	1:49.80	
13	1	Nadjim Manseur	Algeria	1:50.53	
14	1	William Phillip	Sudan	1:51.30	
15	1	Eshetu Zewde	Ethiopia	1:51.83	
16	2	Jimmy Adar	Uganda	1:57.95	

=== Final ===
Rank	Name	Nationality	Time	Notes
1st place, gold medalist(s)	Abubaker Kaki	Sudan	1:45.22	NJR
2nd place, silver medalist(s)	Mbulaeni Mulaudzi	South Africa	1:45.54	SB
3rd place, bronze medalist(s)	Justus Koech	Kenya	1:45.80	
4	Abdoulaye Wagne	Senegal	1:46.12	SB
5	Abraham Chepkirwok	Uganda	1:46.64	
6	Nabil Madi	Algeria	1:48.12	
7	Mahamoud Farah	Djibouti	1:49.24	
8	Ismael Kombich	Kenya	DNF	
