= 2006 World Junior Championships in Athletics – Men's 800 metres =

The men's 800 metres event at the 2006 World Junior Championships in Athletics was held in Beijing, China, at Chaoyang Sports Centre on 15, 16 and 18 August.

== Medalists ==
Gold	David Rudisha; Kenya
Silver	Jackson Kivuva; Kenya
Bronze	Abraham Chepkirwok; Uganda

== Results ==
=== Final ===
18 August

Rank	Name	Nationality	Time	Notes
1st place, gold medalist(s)	David Rudisha	Kenya	1:47.40	
2nd place, silver medalist(s)	Jackson Kivuva	Kenya	1:47.64	
3rd place, bronze medalist(s)	Abraham Chepkirwok	Uganda	1:47.79	
4	Marcin Lewandowski	Poland	1:48.25	
5	Rabii Doukkana	Morocco	1:48.39	
6	Abubaker Kaki	Sudan	1:48.46	
7	Belal Mansour Ali	Bahrain	1:49.09	
8	Andy González	Cuba	1:53.61	

=== Semifinals ===
16 August

==== Semifinal 1 ====
Rank	Name	Nationality	Time	Notes
1	Jackson Kivuva	Kenya	1:48.56	Q
2	Andy González	Cuba	1:48.85	Q
3	Robin Schembera	Germany	1:49.41	
4	James Brewer	United Kingdom	1:49.53	
5	Jimmy Adar	Uganda	1:49.69	
6	Jeff Lastennet	France	1:50.30	
7	Jamaal James	Trinidad and Tobago	1:50.42	
8	Tor Pöllänen	Sweden	1:51.78	

==== Semifinal 2 ====
Rank	Name	Nationality	Time	Notes
1	Abraham Chepkirwok	Uganda	1:47.72	Q
2	Marcin Lewandowski	Poland	1:47.90	Q
3	Lachlan Renshaw	Australia	1:48.26	
4	Masato Yokota	Japan	1:48.98	
5	Wilyam Rabih	Sudan	1:49.31	
6	Dirk Gouws	South Africa	1:49.97	
7	Mekonnen Gebremedhine	Ethiopia	1:50.47	
8	Aleš Veselý	Czech Republic	1:51.16	

==== Semifinal 3 ====
Rank	Name	Nationality	Time	Notes
1	David Rudisha	Kenya	1:47.24	Q
2	Belal Mansour Ali	Bahrain	1:47.54	Q
3	Abubaker Kaki	Sudan	1:47.63	q
4	Rabii Doukana	Morocco	1:47.99	q
5	Nadjim Manseur	Algeria	1:48.06	
6	Dmitrijs Jurkevičs	Latvia	1:49.56	
7	Florian Carvalho	France	1:49.98	
8	Mark Mitchell	United Kingdom	1:53.51	

=== Heats ===
15 August

==== Heat 1 ====
Rank	Name	Nationality	Time	Notes
1	David Rudisha	Kenya	1:49.12	Q
2	Mark Mitchell	United Kingdom	1:50.08	Q
3	Robin Schembera	Germany	1:50.42	Q
4	Shaka Ntsimako	Botswana	1:51.07	
5	Jordan Chipangama	Zambia	1:51.27	
6	Ali Al-Deraan	Saudi Arabia	1:51.69	
7	Lahbib Izzabaha	Morocco	1:52.56	
8	Geoffrey Harris	Canada	1:52.58	

==== Heat 2 ====
Rank	Name	Nationality	Time	Notes
1	Belal Mansour Ali	Bahrain	1:49.24	Q
2	Jackson Kivuva	Kenya	1:50.08	Q
3	Tor Pöllänen	Sweden	1:50.67	Q
4	Sebastian Keiner	Germany	1:50.71	
5	Darren Mazzei	Canada	1:51.88	
6	Jan Masenamela	South Africa	1:54.09	
7	Firdavs Azizov	Tajikistan	1:56.74	

==== Heat 3 ====
Rank	Name	Nationality	Time	Notes
1	Jimmy Adar	Uganda	1:49.22	Q
2	Andy González	Cuba	1:49.63	Q
3	James Brewer	United Kingdom	1:49.90	Q
4	Aleš Veselý	Czech Republic	1:50.46	q
5	Vid Trsan	Slovenia	1:50.81	
6	Nick Toohey	Australia	1:51.30	
7	Glauco Martino	San Marino	1:58.85	

==== Heat 4 ====
Rank	Name	Nationality	Time	Notes
1	Nadjim Manseur	Algeria	1:50.24	Q
2	Marcin Lewandowski	Poland	1:50.24	Q
3	Rabii Doukana	Morocco	1:50.40	Q
4	Masato Yokota	Japan	1:50.56	q
5	Karjuan Williams	United States	1:51.58	
6	David McCarthy	Ireland	1:52.41	
7	Boldbaatar Shijirbagana	Mongolia	2:00.28	
8	Radheshyam Kawang	Nepal	2:04.24	

==== Heat 5 ====
Rank	Name	Nationality	Time	Notes
1	Abraham Chepkirwok	Uganda	1:45.97	Q
2	Lachlan Renshaw	Australia	1:47.00	Q
3	Wilyam Rabih	Sudan	1:47.94	Q
4	Jeff Lastennet	France	1:48.13	q
5	Dirk Gouws	South Africa	1:48.48	q
6	Javier Gálvez	Spain	1:51.59	
7	Brandon Jones	United States	1:55.46	

==== Heat 6 ====
Rank	Name	Nationality	Time	Notes
1	Abubaker Kaki	Sudan	1:48.07	Q
2	Dmitrijs Jurkevičs	Latvia	1:48.89	Q
3	Florian Carvalho	France	1:49.25	Q
4	Mekonnen Gebremedhine	Ethiopia	1:49.73	q
5	Jamaal James	Trinidad and Tobago	1:50.02	q
6	Sajeesh Joseph	India	1:51.48	
7	Álvaro Campo	Spain	1:55.28	

== Participation ==
According to an unofficial count, 44 athletes from 32 countries participated in the event.

- Algeria (1)
- Australia (2)
- Bahrain (1)
- Botswana (1)
- Canada (2)
- Cuba (1)
- Czech Republic (1)
- Ethiopia (1)
- France (2)
- Germany (2)
- India (1)
- Ireland (1)
- Japan (1)
- Kenya (2)
- Latvia (1)
- Mongolia (1)
- Morocco (2)
- Nepal (1)
- Poland (1)
- San Marino (1)
- Saudi Arabia (1)
- Slovenia (1)
- South Africa (2)
- Spain (2)
- Sudan (2)
- Sweden (1)
- Tajikistan (1)
- Trinidad and Tobago (1)
- Uganda (2)
- United Kingdom (2)
- United States (2)
- Zambia (1)
