= Abraham Kiplagat =

Kenyan middle-distance runner

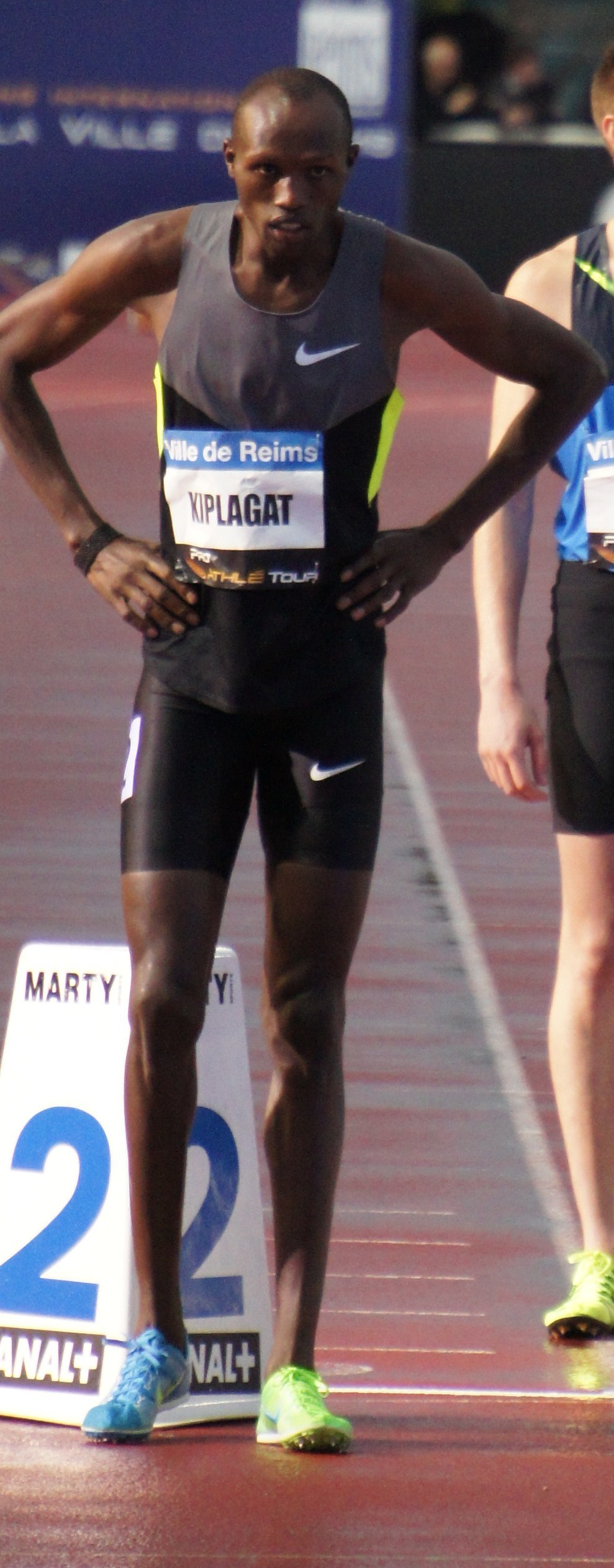

Personal information
- Born: 9 August 1984 (age 41)

Sport
- Country: Kenya
- Sport: Athletics
- Event: Middle-distance running
Medal record
Commonwealth Games
Bronze medal – third place	2010 Delhi	800 m

Abraham Kiplagat (born 9 August 1984) is a Kenyan former middle-distance athlete.

Kiplagat, an 800 metres specialist, was second in the national trials for the 2010 Commonwealth Games and earned a late call up into the team when David Rudisha withdrew from the squad due to fatigue. At the games, held in Delhi, Kiplagat claimed a bronze medal in the 800 metres, which was won by his cousin Boaz Lalang. With Richard Kiplagat taking silver it was the first time in Commonwealth Games history that a nation had swept all 800 metre medals.
