= 2008 African Championships in Athletics – Men's 800 metres =

The men's 800 metres event at the 2008 African Championships in Athletics was held at the Addis Ababa Stadium on April 30–May 2.

== Medalists ==
Gold	Silver	Bronze
David Rudisha; Kenya	Ismail Ahmed Ismail; Sudan	Asbel Kiprop; Kenya

== Results ==
=== Heats ===
Qualification: First 3 of each heat (Q) and the next 4 fastest (q) qualified for the semifinals.

Rank	Heat	Name	Nationality	Time	Notes
1	3	Jackson Kivuva	Kenya	1:50.28	Q
2	4	Asbel Kiprop	Kenya	1:50.32	Q
3	3	Onalenna Baloyi	Botswana	1:50.48	Q
4	3	Samson Ngoepe	South Africa	1:50.48	Q
5	3	Saïd Doulal	Morocco	1:50.52	q
6	4	Shiferaw Wola	Ethiopia	1:50.64	Q
7	4	Abdalla Abdelgadir	Sudan	1:51.56	Q
8	4	Mahamoud Farah	Djibouti	1:51.71	q
9	1	Ismail Ahmed Ismail	Sudan	1:52.72	Q
10	1	Eshetu Zewde	Ethiopia	1:52.80	Q
11	2	David Rudisha	Kenya	1:52.93	Q
12	2	Henok Legesse	Ethiopia	1:53.22	Q
13	1	Severin Sahinkuye	Burundi	1:53.81	Q
14	2	Jimmy Adar	Uganda	1:53.89	Q
15	1	Bakary Jabbi	Gambia	1:56.12	q
16	2	Joseph Nzirorera	Rwanda	1:58.04	q
17	4	Abdalla Mohamed Hussein	Somalia	2:00.22	
18	3	Mohamed Ahmed Omar	Somalia	2:04.19	
19	3	Brahim Ouaddai	Chad	2:05.96	
20	2	Alseny Conde	Guinea	2:07.59	
	1	Abdoulaye Wagne	Senegal	DNS	
	4	Mboyo Iyeli	Democratic Republic of the Congo	DNS	

=== Semifinals ===
Qualification: First 3 of each semifinal (Q) and the next 2 fastest (q) qualified for the final.

Rank	Heat	Name	Nationality	Time	Notes
1	1	Asbel Kiprop	Kenya	1:48.35	Q
2	2	David Rudisha	Kenya	1:48.82	Q
3	1	Shiferaw Wola	Ethiopia	1:48.99	Q
4	1	Ismail Ahmed Ismail	Sudan	1:49.01	Q
5	2	Jackson Kivuva	Kenya	1:49.03	Q
6	2	Henok Legesse	Ethiopia	1:49.03	Q
7	2	Abdalla Abdelgadir	Sudan	1:49.15	q
8	2	Samson Ngoepe	South Africa	1:49.69	q
9	2	Eshetu Zewde	Ethiopia	1:49.92	
10	1	Onalenna Baloyi	Botswana	1:49.94	
11	1	Jimmy Adar	Uganda	1:51.13	
12	1	Mahamoud Farah	Djibouti	1:51.39	
13	1	Joseph Nzirorera	Rwanda	1:52.31	
14	1	Severin Sahinkuye	Burundi	1:52.64	
15	2	Saïd Doulal	Morocco	1:57.42	
	2	Bakary Jabbi	Gambia	DNS	

=== Final ===
Rank	Name	Nationality	Time	Notes
1st place, gold medalist(s)	David Rudisha	Kenya	1:44.20	CR
2nd place, silver medalist(s)	Ismail Ahmed Ismail	Sudan	1:45.41	
3rd place, bronze medalist(s)	Asbel Kiprop	Kenya	1:46.02	
4	Jackson Kivuva	Kenya	1:46.33	
5	Shiferaw Wola	Ethiopia	1:48.37	
6	Henok Legesse	Ethiopia	1:49.10	
7	Samson Ngoepe	South Africa	1:49.22	
8	Abdalla Abdelgadir	Sudan	1:52.98	
