= 2010 African Championships in Athletics – Men's 800 metres =

The men's 800 metres at the 2010 African Championships in Athletics were held on July 28–30.

== Medalists ==
Gold	Silver	Bronze
David Rudisha; Kenya	Alfred Kirwa Yego; Kenya	Jackson Kivuva; Kenya

== Results ==
=== Heats ===
Qualification: First 3 of each heat (Q) and the next 4 fastest (q) qualified for the semifinals.

Rank	Heat	Name	Nationality	Time	Notes
1	1	Alfred Kirwa Yego	Kenya	1:48.66	Q
2	1	Mouhcine Elamine	Morocco	1:48.81	Q
3	4	Shiferaw Wola	Ethiopia	1:49.50	Q
4	3	Jackson Kivuva	Kenya	1:49.93	Q
5	4	Jimmy Adar	Uganda	1:50.00	Q
6	1	Windy Jonas	South Africa	1:50.22	Q
7	2	David Rudisha	Kenya	1:50.51	Q
8	3	Fikadu Dejene	Ethiopia	1:50.82	Q
9	4	Nadjim Manseur	Algeria	1:51.35	Q
10	2	Dawit Wolde	Ethiopia	1:51.44	Q
11	1	Frank Martin	Tanzania	1:51.68	q
12	3	Mbulaeni Mulaudzi	South Africa	1:51.81	Q
13	2	Mor Seck	Senegal	1:51.88	Q
14	4	Severin Sahinkuye	Burundi	1:51.92	q
15	3	Daniel Nghipandulwa	Namibia	1:52.12	q
16	2	Barae Hhera	Tanzania	1:52.38	q
17	1	Alex Fra Ngouari-Mouissi	Republic of the Congo	1:55.68	SB
18	2	Ishaku Mohammed	Nigeria	1:56.02	
19	2	Potien Ntawuyirushintege	Rwanda	1:56.56	
20	1	Lourenco Bartolo Antonio	Angola	1:57.32	
21	2	Vicente Ntutumu Obama	Equatorial Guinea	2:03.58	
	3	Abdalla Mohamed Hussein	Somalia	DNF	
	1	Patrick Saboun	Central African Republic	DNS	
	3	Joseph Malipilo	Zambia	DNS	
	3	Jeremias Silva	Guinea-Bissau	DNS	
	4	Oscar Bouba	Cameroon	DNS	
	4	Abubaker Kaki	Sudan	DNS	

=== Semifinals ===
Qualification: First 3 of each semifinal (Q) and the next 2 fastest (q) qualified for the final.

Rank	Heat	Name	Nationality	Time	Notes
1	2	David Rudisha	Kenya	1:46.58	Q
2	2	Alfred Kirwa Yego	Kenya	1:47.28	Q
3	2	Mouhcine Elamine	Morocco	1:47.68	Q
4	2	Windy Jonas	South Africa	1:48.56	q
5	2	Severin Sahinkuye	Burundi	1:48.79	q, PB
6	1	Jackson Kivuva	Kenya	1:49.49	Q
7	1	Shiferaw Wola	Ethiopia	1:49.53	Q
8	1	Mor Seck	Senegal	1:49.80	Q
9	2	Dawit Wolde	Ethiopia	1:50.26	
10	1	Jimmy Adar	Uganda	1:50.30	
11	1	Daniel Nghipandulwa	Namibia	1:50.35	
12	1	Fikadu Dejene Dabushe	Ethiopia	1:50.94	
13	1	Frank Martin	Tanzania	1:51.43	
14	2	Barae Hhera	Tanzania	1:52.11	
	2	Nadjim Manseur	Algeria	DNF	
	1	Mbulaeni Mulaudzi	South Africa	DNS	

=== Final ===
Rank	Name	Nationality	Time	Notes
1st place, gold medalist(s)	David Rudisha	Kenya	1:42.84	CR
2nd place, silver medalist(s)	Alfred Kirwa Yego	Kenya	1:44.85	SB
3rd place, bronze medalist(s)	Jackson Kivuva	Kenya	1:45.47	SB
4	Shiferaw Wola	Ethiopia	1:46.39	
5	Mouhcine Elamine	Morocco	1:47.18	
6	Mor Seck	Senegal	1:47.61	
7	Severin Sahinkuye	Burundi	1:48.36	PB
8	Windy Jonas	South Africa	1:49.08	
