= Athletics at the 2003 All-Africa Games – Men's 800 metres =

The men's 800 metres at the 2003 All-Africa Games were held on October 12–13.

== Medalists ==
| Gold | Silver | Bronze |
|---|---|---|
| Samwel Mwera; Tanzania | Mbulaeni Mulaudzi; South Africa | Justus Koech; Kenya |

== Results ==
=== Heats ===
Qualification: First 2 of each heat (Q) and the next 2 fastest (q) qualified for the semifinal.

| Rank | Heat | Name | Nationality | Time | Notes |
|---|---|---|---|---|---|
| 1 | 3 | Michael Rotich | Kenya | 1:48.92 | Q |
| 2 | 3 | Hezekiél Sepeng | South Africa | 1:48.94 | Q |
| 3 | 2 | Samwel Mwera | Tanzania | 1:48.98 | Q |
| 4 | 3 | Ismail Ahmed Ismail | Sudan | 1:49.15 | q |
| 5 | 2 | Justus Koech | Kenya | 1:49.58 | Q |
| 6 | 3 | Crispen Mutakanyi | Zimbabwe | 1:49.65 | q |
| 7 | 3 | Ghirmay Tikabo | Eritrea | 1:50.13 | |
| 8 | 3 | Paskar Owor | Uganda | 1:50.25 | |
| 9 | 2 | Graham Davidson | South Africa | 1:50.52 | |
| 10 | 3 | Joseph Kagisye | Burundi | 1:50.70 | |
| 11 | 1 | Abdoulaye Wagne | Senegal | 1:51.03 | Q |
| 12 | 1 | Mbulaeni Mulaudzi | South Africa | 1:51.09 | Q |
| 13 | 1 | Prince Mumba | Zambia | 1:51.57 | |
| 14 | 1 | Henry Rotich | Kenya | 1:51.99 | |
| 15 | 1 | Turk Gamal Beru | Sudan | 1:52.15 | |
| 16 | 2 | Ashenafi Hailu | Ethiopia | 1:52.25 | |
| 17 | 1 | Sidiki Coulibaly | Mali | 1:52.70 | |
| 18 | 2 | Arthémon Hatungimana | Burundi | 1:53.16 | |
| 19 | 2 | Cheik Salou | Burkina Faso | 1:53.76 | |
| 20 | 2 | Mao Tjiroze | Namibia | 1:54.31 | |
| 21 | 1 | Solomon Abtegiorgis | Ethiopia | 1:54.43 | |
| 22 | 1 | Lezin Christian Elongo Ngoyikonda | Republic of the Congo | 1:58.07 | |
| | 2 | Sory Fofana | Guinea | DNS | |
| | 2 | Peter Roko Ashak | Sudan | DNS | |
| | 3 | Dipa Traoré | Mali | DNS | |
| | 3 | Mohamed Hind | Sudan | DNS | |

=== Final ===
| Rank | Name | Nationality | Time | Notes |
|---|---|---|---|---|
| 1st place, gold medalist(s) | Samwel Mwera | Tanzania | 1:46.13 | |
| 2nd place, silver medalist(s) | Mbulaeni Mulaudzi | South Africa | 1:46.44 | |
| 3rd place, bronze medalist(s) | Justus Koech | Kenya | 1:46.50 | |
| 4 | Michael Rotich | Kenya | 1:46.68 | |
| 5 | Ismail Ahmed Ismail | Sudan | 1:47.29 | |
| 6 | Crispen Mutakanyi | Zimbabwe | 1:48.08 | |
| 7 | Hezekiél Sepeng | South Africa | 1:49.76 | |
| 8 | Abdoulaye Wagne | Senegal | 1:49.79 | |
