= Athletics at the 2008 Summer Olympics – Men's 800 metres =

Men's 800 metres at the Games of the XXIX Olympiad
- Venue: Beijing National Stadium
- Dates: 20 August 2008 (heats); 21 August 2008 (semi-finals); 23 August 2008 (final)
- Competitors: 58 from 42 nations
- Winning time: 1:44.65

Medalists
1st place, gold medalist(s)		Wilfred Bungei; Kenya
2nd place, silver medalist(s)		Ismail Ahmed Ismail; Sudan
3rd place, bronze medalist(s)		Alfred Kirwa Yego; Kenya

Video on YouTube Official Video

The men's 800 metres at the 2008 Summer Olympics took place from 20–23 August at the Beijing National Stadium. Fifty-eight athletes from 40 nations competed. The qualifying standards were 1:46.00 (A standard) and 1:47.00 (B standard). The final on 23 August resulted in a triumph for Kenyan runner Wilfred Bungei in an official time of 1:44.65, winning by 0.05 seconds. It was the first victory in the event for Kenya since 1992 and the third overall. Ismail Ahmed Ismail's silver medal was Sudan's first Olympic medal in any competition.

== Summary ==
Along the way to the final, defending champion Yuriy Borzakovskiy was eliminated as his fast closing tactics didn't get him into a qualifying place or time. In the final, most of the field got off fairly evenly, with Ismail Ahmed Ismail showing the least interest in joining the pack of seven. By 200 metres, Wilfred Bungei, wearing sunglasses in the Beijing night, had found his way to the lead with his Kenyan teammate Alfred Kirwa Yego protecting him on his shoulder. Ismail joined the back of the pack and without leaving the rail, almost casually worked his way to being a step behind Bungei at the end of the first lap. Bungei and the field accelerated on the back stretch with Ismail staying on the rail running into a box inside of Yego. As Yego faltered through the final turn, Yeimer López ran around him into the perfect strategic position, still leaving Ismail boxed into no-mans land. Coming off the turn, Ismail simply ran faster and ran out of the trap, López was out of gas. Bungei took off into a sprint with his right arm flapping, opening up two metres on Ismail, who drifted out to lane 2 for clear running. Ten metres before the finish, Bungei let up and coasted over the finish line, Ismail tried to pass, dipping at the line but Bungei's lead was just enough to hold onto gold. In the final rush for bronze, Kenyan mercenary running for Bahrain Yusuf Saad Kamel looked to have the edge, but Yego moved out to lane 3 to avoid López and run down Kamel. With a final rush, Gary Reed caught Kamel at the line, still a step behind Yego.

== Background ==
This was the 26th appearance of the event, which is one of 12 athletics events to have been held at every Summer Olympics. Five of the finalists from 2004 returned, including the champion: gold medalist Yuriy Borzakovskiy of Russia, silver medalist Mbulaeni Mulaudzi of South Africa, fourth-place finisher Mouhssin Chehibi of Morocco, fifth-place finisher Wilfred Bungei of Kenya, and eight-place finisher Ismail Ahmed Ismail of Sudan. Alfred Kirwa Yego of Kenya was the 2007 world champion and was expected to compete with his countryman Bungei and the Sudanese team (including Ismail and 2008 world list leader Abubaker Kaki Khamis) for the medals.

Guam, Samoa, and Slovakia appeared in the event for the first time. Great Britain made its 25th appearance, most among all nations, having had no competitors in the event only in the 1904 Games in St. Louis.

== Qualification ==
Each National Olympic Committee (NOC) was able to enter up to three entrants providing they had met the A qualifying standard (1:46.00) in the qualifying period (1 January 2007 to 23 July 2008). The maximum number of athletes per nation had been set at 3 since the 1930 Olympic Congress. NOCs were also permitted to enter one athlete providing he had met the B standard (1:47.00) in the same qualifying period.

== Competition format ==
The men's 800 metres returned to a smaller field (58 athletes in 2008, compared to 72 in 2004 and 61 in 2000). It again used a three-round format, the most common format since 1912 though there had been variations. The "fastest loser" system introduced in 1964 was used for the first two rounds. There were eight first-round heats, each with 7 or 8 athletes; the top two runners in each heat as well as the next eight fastest overall advanced to the semifinals. There were three semifinals with 8 athletes each; the top two runners in each semifinal and the next two fastest overall advanced to the eight-man final.

== Records ==
Prior to this competition, the existing world record, Olympic record, and world leading time were as follows:

World record	Wilson Kipketer (DEN)	1:41.11	Cologne, Germany	24 August 1997
Olympic record	Vebjørn Rodal (NOR)	1:42.58	Atlanta, United States	31 July 1996
World Leading	Abubaker Kaki (SUD)	1:42.69	Oslo, Norway	6 June 2008

No new world or Olympic records were set for this event. The following national records were established during the competition:

Nation	Athlete	Round	Time
Samoa	Aunese Curreen	Heat 5	1:47.45

== Schedule ==
All times are China Standard Time (UTC+8)

Date	Time	Round
Wednesday, 20 August 2008	19:00	Round 1
Thursday, 21 August 2008	19:50	Semifinals
Saturday, 23 August 2008	19:30	Final

== Results ==
=== Round 1 ===
The first round was held on 20 August. The first two runners of each heat (Q) plus the next eight overall fastest runners (q) qualified for the second round.

==== Heat 1 ====
Rank	Athlete	Nation	Time	Notes
1	Wilfred Bungei	Kenya	1:44.90	Q, SB
2	Yuriy Borzakovskiy	Russia	1:45.15	Q
3	Nadjim Manseur	Algeria	1:45.62	q
4	Fabiano Peçanha	Brazil	1:46.54	q
5	Thomas Chamney	Ireland	1:47.66	
6	Lachlan Renshaw	Australia	1:49.19	
7	Ehsan Mohajer Shojaei	Iran	1:49.25	

==== Heat 2 ====
Rank	Athlete	Nation	Time	Notes
1	Abubaker Kaki	Sudan	1:46.98	Q
2	Mohammed Al-Salhi	Saudi Arabia	1:47.02	Q
3	Dmitriy Bogdanov	Russia	1:47.49	
4	Onalenna Baloyi	Botswana	1:47.89	
5	Jozef Repcìk	Slovakia	1:48.64	
6	Leonardo Price	Argentina	1:49.39	
—	Antar Zerguelaine	Algeria	DNS	

==== Heat 3 ====
Rank	Athlete	Nation	Time	Notes
1	Michael Rimmer	Great Britain	1:47.61	Q
2	Mbulaeni Mulaudzi	South Africa	1:47.64	Q
3	Paweł Czapiewski	Poland	1:47.66	
4	Miguel Quesada	Spain	1:48.06	
5	Li Xiangyu	China	1:48.44	
6	Vitalij Kozlov	Lithuania	1:48.96	
7	Samwel Mwera	Tanzania	1:50.67	
—	Nick Willis	New Zealand	DNS	

==== Heat 4 ====
Rank	Athlete	Nation	Time	Notes
1	Nick Symmonds	United States	1:46.01	Q
2	Alfred Kirwa Yego	Kenya	1:46.04	Q
3	Antonio Manuel Reina	Spain	1:46.30	q
4	Andy González	Cuba	1:46.59	
5	Mouhssin Chehibi	Morocco	1:46.75	
6	Eduard Villanueva	Venezuela	1:47.64	
7	Nguyen Dinh Cuong	Vietnam	1:52.06	
8	Derek Mandell	Guam	1:57.48	PB

==== Heat 5 ====
Rank	Athlete	Nation	Time	Notes
1	Manuel Olmedo	Spain	1:45.78	Q
2	Ismail Ahmed Ismail	Sudan	1:45.87	Q
3	Gary Reed	Canada	1:46.02	q
4	Dmitrijs Miļkevičs	Latvia	1:47.12	
5	Samson Ngoepe	South Africa	1:47.42	
6	Aunese Curreen	Samoa	1:47.45	NR
7	Souleymane Ould Chebal	Mauritania	1:57.43	
—	Byron Piedra	Ecuador	DNS	

==== Heat 6 ====
Rank	Athlete	Nation	Time	Notes
1	Amine Laalou	Morocco	1:47.86	Q
2	Abraham Chepkirwok	Uganda	1:47.93	Q
3	Jakub Holuša	Czech Republic	1:48.19	
4	Christian Smith	United States	1:48.20	
5	Kléberson Davide	Brazil	1:48.53	
6	Achraf Tadili	Canada	1:48.87	
7	Fadrique Iglesias	Bolivia	1:50.57	
8	Mohammed Al-Yafaee	Yemen	1:54.82	

==== Heat 7 ====
Rank	Athlete	Nation	Time	Notes
1	Mohammad Al-Azemi	Kuwait	1:46.94	Q
2	Yusuf Saad Kamel	Bahrain	1:46.94	Q
3	Robert Lathouwers	Netherlands	1:46.94	
4	Andrew Wheating	United States	1:47.05	
5	Abdoulaye Wagne	Senegal	1:47.50	
6	Aldwyn Sappleton	Jamaica	1:48.19	
7	Sergey Pakura	Kyrgyzstan	1:50.54	

==== Heat 8 ====
Rank	Athlete	Nation	Time	Notes
1	Yeimer López	Cuba	1:45.66	Q
2	Boaz Kiplagat Lalang	Kenya	1:45.72	Q
3	Nabil Madi	Algeria	1:45.75	q
4	Marcin Lewandowski	Poland	1:45.89	q, SB
5	Belal Mansoor Ali	Bahrain	1:45.95	q, SB
6	Sajjad Moradi	Iran	1:46.10	q
7	Yassine Bensghir	Morocco	1:46.88	
8	Mikko Lahtio	Finland	1:47.20	

==== Overall results for round 1 ====
Rank	Heat	Athlete	Nation	Time	Notes
1	1	Wilfred Bungei	Kenya	1:44.90	Q, SB
2	1	Yuriy Borzakovskiy	Russia	1:45.15	Q
3	1	Nadjim Manseur	Algeria	1:45.62	q
4	8	Yeimer López	Cuba	1:45.66	Q
5	8	Boaz Kiplagat Lalang	Kenya	1:45.72	Q
6	8	Nabil Madi	Algeria	1:45.75	q
7	5	Manuel Olmedo	Spain	1:45.78	Q
8	5	Ismail Ahmed Ismail	Sudan	1:45.87	Q
9	8	Marcin Lewandowski	Poland	1:45.89	q, SB
10	8	Belal Mansoor Ali	Bahrain	1:45.95	q, SB
11	4	Nick Symmonds	United States	1:46.01	Q
12	5	Gary Reed	Canada	1:46.02	q
13	4	Alfred Kirwa Yego	Kenya	1:46.04	Q
14	8	Sajjad Moradi	Iran	1:46.10	q
15	4	Antonio Manuel Reina	Spain	1:46.30	q
16	1	Fabiano Peçanha	Brazil	1:46.54	q
17	4	Andy González	Cuba	1:46.59	
18	4	Mouhssin Chehibi	Morocco	1:46.75	
19	8	Yassine Bensghir	Morocco	1:46.88	
20	7	Mohammad Al-Azemi	Kuwait	1:46.94	Q
21	7	Yusuf Saad Kamel	Bahrain	1:46.94	Q
22	7	Robert Lathouwers	Netherlands	1:46.94	
23	2	Abubaker Kaki	Sudan	1:46.98	Q
24	2	Mohammed Al-Salhi	Saudi Arabia	1:47.02	Q
25	7	Andrew Wheating	United States	1:47.05	
26	5	Dmitrijs Miļkevičs	Latvia	1:47.12	
27	8	Mikko Lahtio	Finland	1:47.20	
28	5	Samson Ngoepe	South Africa	1:47.42	
29	5	Aunese Curreen	Samoa	1:47.45	NR
30	2	Dmitriy Bogdanov	Russia	1:47.49	
31	7	Abdoulaye Wagne	Senegal	1:47.50	
32	3	Michael Rimmer	Great Britain	1:47.61	Q
33	3	Mbulaeni Mulaudzi	South Africa	1:47.64	Q
33	4	Eduard Villanueva	Venezuela	1:47.64	
35	1	Thomas Chamney	Ireland	1:47.66	
35	3	Paweł Czapiewski	Poland	1:47.66	
37	6	Amine Laalou	Morocco	1:47.86	Q
38	2	Onalenna Baloyi	Botswana	1:47.89	
39	6	Abraham Chepkirwok	Uganda	1:47.93	Q
40	3	Miguel Quesada	Spain	1:48.06	
41	6	Jakub Holuša	Czech Republic	1:48.19	
41	7	Aldwyn Sappleton	Jamaica	1:48.19	
43	6	Christian Smith	United States	1:48.20	
44	3	Li Xiangyu	China	1:48.44	
45	6	Kléberson Davide	Brazil	1:48.53	
46	2	Jozef Repcìk	Slovakia	1:48.64	
47	6	Achraf Tadili	Canada	1:48.87	
48	3	Vitalij Kozlov	Lithuania	1:48.96	
49	1	Lachlan Renshaw	Australia	1:49.19	
50	1	Ehsan Mohajer Shojaei	Iran	1:49.25	
51	2	Leonardo Price	Argentina	1:49.39	
52	7	Sergey Pakura	Kyrgyzstan	1:50.54	
53	6	Fadrique Iglesias	Bolivia	1:50.57	
54	3	Samwel Mwera	Tanzania	1:50.67	
55	4	Nguyen Dinh Cuong	Vietnam	1:52.06	
56	6	Mohammed Al-Yafaee	Yemen	1:54.82	
57	5	Souleymane Ould Chebal	Mauritania	1:57.43	
58	4	Derek Mandell	Guam	1:57.48	PB
—	5	Byron Piedra	Ecuador	DNS	
—	3	Nick Willis	New Zealand	DNS	
—	2	Antar Zerguelaine	Algeria	DNS	

=== Semifinals ===
Qual. rule: first 2 of each heat (Q) plus the 2 fastest times (q) qualified.

==== Semifinal 1 ====
21 August 2008 - 19:50

Rank	Lane	Athlete	Nation	Time	Notes
1	8	Wilfred Bungei	Kenya	1:46.23	Q
2	5	Yeimer López	Cuba	1:46.40	Q
3	7	Yuriy Borzakovskiy	Russia	1:46.53	
4	4	Amine Laalou	Morocco	1:46.74	
5	6	Nick Symmonds	United States	1:46.96	
6	9	Mohammed Al-Salhi	Saudi Arabia	1:47.14	
7	2	Marcin Lewandowski	Poland	1:47.24	
8	3	Mohammad Al-Azemi	Kuwait	1:47.65	

==== Semifinal 2 ====
21 August 2008 - 19:58

Rank	Lane	Athlete	Country	Time	Notes
1	5	Alfred Kirwa Yego	Kenya	1:44.73	Q
2	6	Ismail Ahmed Ismail	Sudan	1:44.91	Q
3	7	Yusuf Saad Kamel	Bahrain	1:44.95	q
4	9	Nadjim Manseur	Algeria	1:45.54	q
5	8	Sajjad Moradi	Iran	1:46.08	
6	4	Mbulaeni Mulaudzi	South Africa	1:46.24	
7	2	Antonio Manuel Reina	Spain	1:46.40	
8	3	Fabiano Peçanha	Brazil	1:47.07	

==== Semifinal 3 ====
21 August 2008 - 20:06

Rank	Lane	Athlete	Country	Time	Notes
1	2	Nabil Madi	Algeria	1:45.63	Q
2	4	Gary Reed	Canada	1:45.85	Q
3	5	Boaz Kiplagat Lalang	Kenya	1:45.87	
4	9	Manuel Olmedo	Spain	1:45.91	
5	3	Belal Mansoor Ali	Bahrain	1:46.37	
6	8	Michael Rimmer	Great Britain	1:48.07	
7	7	Abraham Chepkirwok	Uganda	1:49.16	
8	6	Abubaker Kaki	Sudan	1:49.19	

=== Final ===
23 August 2008 - 19:30

Rank	Lane	Athlete	Nation	Time	Notes
1st place, gold medalist(s)	3	Wilfred Bungei	Kenya	1:44.65	SB
2nd place, silver medalist(s)	8	Ismail Ahmed Ismail	Sudan	1:44.70	
3rd place, bronze medalist(s)	5	Alfred Kirwa Yego	Kenya	1:44.82	
4	6	Gary Reed	Canada	1:44.94	
5	4	Yusuf Saad Kamel	Bahrain	1:44.95	
6	7	Yeimer López	Cuba	1:45.88	
7	2	Nabil Madi	Algeria	1:45.96	
8	9	Nadjim Manseur	Algeria	1:47.19	

Splits

Intermediate	Athlete	Nation	Mark
400m	Wilfred Bungei	Kenya	53.35
600m	Wilfred Bungei	Kenya	1:19.17
