= Ngoepe =

Ngoepe is a surname of South African origin. Notable people with the name include:

- Bernard Ngoepe (born 1947), South African judge
- Gift Ngoepe (born 1990), South African baseball infielder
- Lesiba Ngoepe (born 1993), South African cricketer
- Samson Ngoepe (born 1985), South African runner who specializes in the 800 metres
