= Mikko Lahtio =

Finnish middle-distance runner

Personal information
- Full name: Mikko Antti Juhani Lahtio
- Nationality: Finland
- Born: 21 September 1984 (age 42) Loppi, Finland
- Height: 1.93 m (6 ft 4 in)
- Weight: 72 kg (159 lb)

Sport
- Sport: Athletics
- Event: Middle distance running
- Club: Helsingin Kisa-Veikot (FIN)
- Coached by: Olavi Lahtio

Achievements and titles
- Personal best: 800 m: 1:46.59 (2008)

Mikko Antti Juhani Lahtio (born 21 September 1984 in Loppi) is a Finnish middle-distance runner, who specialized in the 800 metres. Lahtio represented Finland at the 2008 Summer Olympics in Beijing, where he competed for the men's 800 metres. He ran in the eighth heat against seven other competitors, including Cuba's Yeimer López and Algeria's Nabil Madi, who both reached into the final round. He finished the race in last place by thirty-two hundredths of a second behind Morocco's Yassine Bensghir, with a time of 1:47.20. Lahtio, however, failed to advance into the semi-finals, as he placed twenty-seventh overall and was ranked farther below two mandatory slots for the next round.

Lahtio is a graduate of construction engineering at HAMK University of Applied Sciences in Hämeenlinna. He is also a full-time member of Helsingin Kisa-Veikot, a local track and field club in Helsinki, and has been coached all through his career by his father Olavi.
