= Athletics at the 2010 Commonwealth Games – Men's 800 metres =

Men's 800 metres at the Commonwealth Games

The Men's 800 metres at the 2010 Commonwealth Games as part of the athletics programme was held at the Jawaharlal Nehru Stadium on Friday 8 October and Sunday 10 October 2010.

The top three runners in each of the initial four heats automatically alongside the four fasters runners qualified for the semifinals. The top three plus the two fastest runners advanced to the final.

== Records ==
World Record	1:41.01	David Rudisha	KEN	Rieti, Italy	29 August 2010
Games Record	1:43.22	Steve Cram	ENG	Edinburgh, Scotland	1986

== Round 1 ==
First 3 in each heat (Q) and 4 best performers (q) advance to the Semifinals.

=== Heat 1 ===
Rank	Lane	Name	Result	Notes
1	4	Abraham Kiplagat (KEN)	1:49.92	Q
2	5	Francis Pathi (IND)	1:50.12	Q
3	8	Andrew Osagie (ENG)	1:50.44	Q
4	6	James McIlroy (NIR)	1:50.91	q
5	3	Andre Drummonds (JAM)	1:55.48	
6	7	Hameed Mohamed (MDV)	2:01.07	PB
7	2	Tony Ialu (VAN)	2:04.46	

=== Heat 2 ===
Rank	Lane	Name	Result	Notes
1	3	Jimmy Adar (UGA)	1:49.47	Q
2	8	Chris Gowell (WAL)	1:49.92	Q
3	6	Darren St. Clair (ENG)	1:50.18	Q
4	4	Jon Rankin (CAY)	1:51.35	q
5	5	Thomas Vandy (SLE)	1:51.69	PB
–	7	Yuvaraaj Panerselvam (MAS)		DNS

=== Heat 3 ===
Rank	Lane	Name	Result	Notes
1	7	Boaz Lalang (KEN)	1:50.46	Q
2	8	Lachlan Renshaw (AUS)	1:50.74	Q
3	2	Gareth Warburton (WAL)	1:51.64	Q
4	3	Ricardo Cunningham (JAM)	1:52.65	
5	6	Vadivellan Mahendran (MAS)	1:54.39	
6	5	Kossam Chale (MAW)	1:57.36	
7	4	Shifaz Moahmed (MDV)	1:59.18	PB

=== Heat 4 ===
Rank	Lane	Name	Result	Notes
1	2	Richard Kiplagat (KEN)	1:49.42	Q
2	4	Joe Thomas (WAL)	1:50.17	Q
3	7	Niall Brooks (ENG)	1:50.54	Q
4	6	Arnold Sorina (VAN)	1:51.13	q, NR
5	3	Manjit (IND)	1:51.22	q
6	5	Alusine Deen-Sesay (SLE)	1:56.43	

== Semifinals ==
First 3 in each heat (Q) and 2 best performers (q) advance to the Final.

=== Semifinal 1 ===
Rank	Lane	Name	Result	Notes
1	3	Boaz Lalang (KEN)	1:46.41	Q
2	7	Richard Kiplagat (KEN)	1:46.73	Q
3	6	Gareth Warburton (WAL)	1:46.83	Q
4	4	Darren St. Clair (ENG)	1:46.92	q
5	5	Lachlan Renshaw (AUS)	1:47.26	q
6	2	James McIlroy (NIR)	1:47.76	SB
7	8	Manjit (IND)	1:50.88	
8	9	Jon Rankin (CAY)	1:51.10	NR

=== Semifinal 2 ===
Rank	Lane	Name	Result	Notes
1	9	Abraham Kiplagat (KEN)	1:47.09	Q
2	2	Jimmy Adar (UGA)	1:47.15	Q
3	8	Joe Thomas (WAL)	1:47.22	Q
4	7	Andrew Osagie (ENG)	1:47.52	
5	4	Niall Brooks (ENG)	1:48.33	
6	6	Chris Gowell (WAL)	1:49.78	
7	5	Arnold Sorina (VAN)	1:51.84	
–	3	Francis Pathi (IND)		DNF

== Final ==
Rank	Lane	Name	Result	Notes
1st place, gold medalist(s)	5	Boaz Lalang (KEN)	1:46.60	
2nd place, silver medalist(s)	4	Richard Kiplagat (KEN)	1:46.95	
3rd place, bronze medalist(s)	7	Abraham Kiplagat (KEN)	1:47.37	
4	3	Gareth Warburton (WAL)	1:48.59	
5	8	Jimmy Adar (UGA)	1:49.57	
6	6	Darren St. Clair (ENG)	1:52.15	
7	9	Joe Thomas (WAL)	1:52.39	
–	2	Lachlan Renshaw (AUS)	–	DNS
