= Jackson Kivuva =

Kenyan middle-distance runner

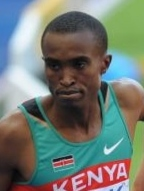
- Kivuva at the 2009 World Championships.

Medal record

Men's athletics

Representing Kenya

African Championships
Bronze medal – third place	2010 Nairobi	800 m

Jackson Mumbwa Kivuva (born August 11, 1989) is a Kenyan middle-distance runner who specialises in 800 metres. His surname is sometimes misspelled as "Kivuna".

== Background ==
Kivuva started running in 2002 while at Syanamu Primary school. Later he went to Kinyui High School in Kangundo. He is a silver medalist from the 2006 World Junior Championships behind compatriot David Rudisha. The same year he won 800 metres gold at the Africa Zone 5 Junior Championships. He finished fourth at the Kenyan trial for the 2008 Olympics, missing the ticket to Beijing.

He is competing at the 2009 World Championships in Berlin.

Joseph Mutua, who is also an 800m runner, comes from the same village as Kivuva. Jackson is the cousin to Samuel Mutua Kimani

== Achievements ==
Year	Competition	Venue	Position	Event	Notes
Representing Kenya
2005	World Youth Championships	Marrakesh, Morocco	2nd	800m	1:48.57
2006	World Junior Championships	Beijing, China	2nd	800m	1:47.64
2006	World Junior Championships	Beijing, China	4th	4 × 400 m relay	3:05.54
2008	African Championships	Addis Ababa, Ethiopia	4th	800m	1:46.33
2008	African Championships	Addis Ababa, Ethiopia	6th	4 × 400 m relay	3:06.95
2009	World Championships	Berlin, Germany	9th	800m	1:46.39
2010	African Championships	Nairobi, Kenya	3rd	800 m	1:45.47
2011	World Championships	Daegu, South Korea	12th (sf)	800m	1:45.97
2015	African Games	Brazzaville, Republic of the Congo	5th	800 m	1:50.98
