= Athletics at the 2005 Summer Universiade – Men's 800 metres =

The men's 800 metres event at the 2005 Summer Universiade was held on 17–20 August in İzmir, Turkey.

== Medalists ==
Gold	Silver	Bronze
Fabiano Peçanha; Brazil	Selahattin Çobanoglu; Turkey	Maksim Adamovich; Russia

== Results ==
=== Heats ===
Rank	Heat	Athlete	Nationality	Time	Notes
1	6	Fabiano Peçanha	Brazil	1:48.54	Q
2	6	José Manuel Cortés	Spain	1:48.57	Q
3	6	Juan van Deventer	South Africa	1:49.76	q
4	7	Christian Neunhäuserer	Italy	1:49.94	Q
5	6	David Gill	Canada	1:50.14	q
6	5	Charles Jantjies	South Africa	1:50.50	Q
7	7	Diego Chargal Gomes	Brazil	1:50.69	Q
8	3	Li Xiangyu	China	1:50.80	Q
9	5	Reda Aït Douida	Morocco	1:51.00	Q
10	3	Martell Munguia	Mexico	1:51.07	Q
11	2	Selahattin Çobanoglu	Turkey	1:51.23	Q
12	3	Abolfazl Dehnavi	Iran	1:51.26	
13	7	Yoshihiro Shimodaira	Japan	1:51.28	
14	6	Heleodoro Navarro	Mexico	1:51.54	
15	5	Siarhei Nestserau	Belarus	1:51.76	
16	2	Thomas Matthys	Belgium	1:52.06	Q
17	6	Richard Jones	New Zealand	1:52.12	
18	1	Li Guangming	China	1:52.25	Q
19	4	Ehsan Mohajer Shojaei	Iran	1:52.29	Q
20	4	Maksim Adamovich	Russia	1:52.36	Q
21	4	Maurizio Bobbato	Italy	1:52.45	
22	1	Prosper Agage	Ghana	1:53.00	Q
22	4	Walid Meliani	Algeria	1:53.00	
24	4	Kondwani Chiwina	Malawi	1:53.03	SB
25	3	Avetik Arakelian	Armenia	1:53.63	
26	3	Marco Vinicio Pérez	Costa Rica	1:54.04	
27	2	Juan Odalis Almonte	Dominican Republic	1:54.32	
28	7	Salvador Crespo	Spain	1:54.67	
29	1	Dmitriy Tarasenko	Kazakhstan	1:54.77	
30	5	Mlungisi Dlamini	Swaziland	1:55.16	
31	7	Ali Al-Balooshi	United Arab Emirates	1:55.39	
32	6	Geofrey Wamaniala	Uganda	1:56.64	
33	2	Lau Tak Lung	Hong Kong	1:58.63	
34	7	Mohamed El-Shoshan	Libya	1:59.02	
35	3	Camilo Quevedo	Guatemala	2:00.71	
36	5	Sohel Rana	Bangladesh	2:06.44	
37	2	Telguy Djibeng	Chad	2:06.78	
38	1	Keith Sepety	Federated States of Micronesia	2:09.16	
	4	Jeppe Thomsen	Denmark	DNF	
	7	Alibey Shukurov	Azerbaijan	DNF	

=== Semifinals ===
Rank	Heat	Athlete	Nationality	Time	Notes
1	2	Selahattin Çobanoglu	Turkey	1:47.53	Q
2	2	Fabiano Peçanha	Brazil	1:47.84	Q
3	2	Maksim Adamovich	Russia	1:47.96	Q
4	2	Li Xiangyu	China	1:47.97	q, SB
5	2	José Manuel Cortés	Spain	1:47.97	q
6	1	Ehsan Mohajer Shojaei	Iran	1:48.62	Q
7	1	Charles Jantjies	South Africa	1:48.92	Q
8	1	Diego Chargal Gomes	Brazil	1:49.03	Q
9	2	Juan van Deventer	South Africa	1:49.03	q
10	2	Thomas Matthys	Belgium	1:49.07	
11	1	Christian Neunhäuserer	Italy	1:49.08	
12	1	David Gill	Canada	1:49.84	
13	1	Prosper Agage	Ghana	1:51.36	PB
14	1	Li Guangming	China	1:53.75	
15	1	Martell Munguia	Mexico	1:57.25	
	2	Reda Aït Douida	Morocco	DNF	

=== Final ===
Rank	Athlete	Nationality	Time	Notes
1st place, gold medalist(s)	Fabiano Peçanha	Brazil	1:46.01	
2nd place, silver medalist(s)	Selahattin Çobanoglu	Turkey	1:47.49	SB
3rd place, bronze medalist(s)	Maksim Adamovich	Russia	1:47.50	
4	Charles Jantjies	South Africa	1:47.57	
5	José Manuel Cortés	Spain	1:47.59	SB
6	Ehsan Mohajer Shojaei	Iran	1:47.96	
7	Juan van Deventer	South Africa	1:48.50	
8	Diego Chargal Gomes	Brazil	1:49.59	
9	Li Xiangyu	China	1:56.05	
