= Joe Thomas (runner) =

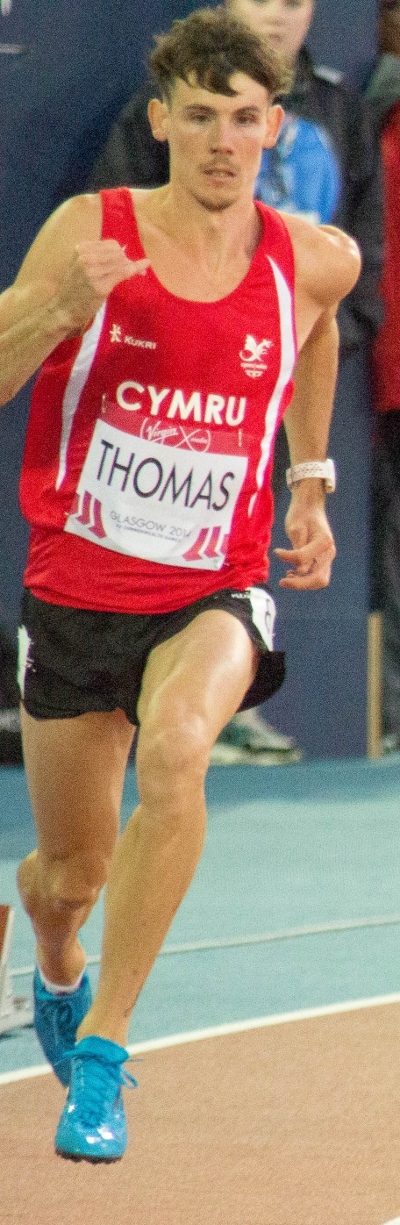
- Joe Thomas competing at the 2014 Commonwealth Games

Personal information
- Nationality: British
- Born: 29 January 1988 (age 38) Pontypridd, Wales
- Height: 1.85 m (6 ft 1 in)
- Weight: 67 kg (148 lb) (2014)

Sport
- Sport: Running
- Event: 800 metres
- Club: Cardiff AAC

Joe Thomas (born 29 January 1988 in Pontypridd) is a Welsh athlete specializing in the middle-distance events. He competed at the 2012 World Indoor Championships reaching the semifinals. In June 2014 he was diagnosed with Crohn's disease.

== Competition record ==
Year	Competition	Venue	Position	Event	Notes
Representing Great Britain and Wales
2010	Commonwealth Games	Delhi, India	7th	800 m	1:52.39
2010	Commonwealth Games	Delhi, India	6th	4 × 400 m relay	3:06.91
2011	European Indoor Championships	Paris, France	12th (sf)	800 m	1:51.44
2011	Universiade	Shenzhen, China	16th (sf)	800 m	1:49.04
2011	Universiade	Shenzhen, China	5th	4 × 400 m relay	3:08.68
2012	World Indoor Championships	Istanbul, Turkey	11th (sf)	800 m	1:49.12
2013	European Indoor Championships	Gothenburg, Sweden	4th (sf)	800 m	1:49.14
2014	Commonwealth Games	Glasgow, United Kingdom	13th (sf)	800 m	1:50.08

== Personal bests ==
Outdoor

- 800 m – 1:46.20 (Oordegem 2008)
- 1000 m – 2:19.91 (Gateshead 2008)

Indoor

- 800 m – 1:46.33 (Stockholm 2012)

== See also ==
- List of people diagnosed with Crohn's disease
