= Daniel Nghipandulwa =

Namibian middle-distance runner

Personal information
- Nationality: Namibian
- Born: 8 June 1985 (age 41)

Sport
- Sport: Track and Field
- Events: 800 metres & 1500 metres

Achievements and titles
- Personal bests: 800 m: 1:46.62 (2011); 1500 m: 3:50.13 (2012)

Daniel Nghipandulwa (born 8 June 1985) is a Namibian middle-distance athlete. Nghipandulwa competed in the 2011 World Championships. He didn't manage to get past the heats with a time of 1:48.79. Nghipandulwa is also the Namibian record holder for the 800 metres with a time of 1:46.62.

defending 800m and 1500m since 2005 to 2021 in Namibian national championship.

== Achievements ==
Year	Competition	Venue	Position	Notes
Representing Namibia
2010	African Championships	Nairobi, Kenya	11th (sf)	800 m
2010	African Championships	Nairobi, Kenya	21st (h)	1500 m
2011	World Championships	Daegu, South Korea	33rd (h)	800 m
2011	All-Africa Games	Maputo, Mozambique	13th (h)	800 m
