= Athletics at the 2011 Summer Universiade – Men's 800 metres =

The men's 800 metres event at the 2011 Summer Universiade was held on 19–21 August.

== Medalists ==
Gold	Silver	Bronze
Lachlan Renshaw; Australia	Teng Haining; China	Fred Samoei; Kenya

== Results ==
=== Heats ===
Qualification: First 3 in each heat (Q) and the next 3 fastest (q) qualified for the semifinals.

Rank	Heat	Name	Nationality	Time	Notes
1	2	Fred Samoei	Kenya	1:46.23	Q
2	2	Ahmed Mainy	Morocco	1:47.65	Q, PB
3	2	Anis Ananenka	Belarus	1:48.95	Q
4	4	Vitalij Kozlov	Lithuania	1:49.74	Q
5	4	Lachlan Renshaw	Australia	1:49.77	Q
6	4	Ryan Martin	United States	1:49.90	Q
7	4	Tommy Granlund	Sweden	1:49.99	q
8	2	Abdelmadjed Touil	Algeria	1:50.13	q
9	6	Joe Thomas	Great Britain	1:50.18	Q
10	5	Vyacheslav Sokolov	Russia	1:50.20	Q
11	5	Lutimar Paes	Brazil	1:50.26	Q
12	6	James Kaan	Australia	1:50.37	Q
13	5	Tlou Seloba	South Africa	1:50.41	Q
14	6	Otlaadisa Segosebe	Botswana	1:50.41	Q, PB
15	6	Roman Fosti	Estonia	1:50.94	q
16	1	Sören Ludolph	Germany	1:50.98	Q
17	1	André Olivier	South Africa	1:51.02	Q
18	1	Cihat Ulus	Turkey	1:51.09	Q
19	3	Teng Haining	China	1:51.21	Q
20	3	Rafith Rodríguez	Colombia	1:51.24	Q
21	1	Vid Tršan	Slovenia	1:51.32	
22	7	Mahfoud Brahimi	Algeria	1:51.36	Q
23	7	Oleksandr Osmolovych	Ukraine	1:51.59	Q
24	6	Jowayne Hibbert	Jamaica	1:51.81	
25	3	Sajjad Moradi	Iran	1:51.88	Q
26	4	Mohd Jironi Riduan	Malaysia	1:51.90	SB
27	5	Ivan Obezchik	Kazakhstan	1:52.04	
28	3	Edgar Cortez	Nicaragua	1:52.05	
29	5	Moslem Niadoost	Iran	1:52.08	
30	7	Casimir Loxsom	United States	1:52.09	Q
31	3	Jaden Ostapowich	Canada	1:52.18	
32	7	Dušan Babić	Bosnia and Herzegovina	1:52.39	
33	6	Alex Ngouari-Mouissi	Republic of the Congo	1:52.66	PB
34	2	Ragnar Lipp	Estonia	1:52.72	SB
35	7	Farkhod Kuralov	Tajikistan	1:52.82	
36	2	Mervin Guarte	Philippines	1:53.32	
37	2	Matias Reedtz	Denmark	1:53.47	
38	2	Julio Pérez	Peru	1:53.71	
39	1	Nimet Gashi	Albania	1:55.38	PB
40	7	Lee Mooyong	South Korea	1:55.60	
41	3	Merab Kinnidze	Georgia	1:55.66	
42	4	Marius Schneider	Norway	1:56.46	
43	5	Benjamin Njia	Uganda	1:56.76	
44	1	Varasiko Tomeru	Fiji	1:57.31	
45	7	Seymour Walter	United States Virgin Islands	1:58.16	
46	4	Christopher Svensson	Sweden	1:58.36	
47	4	Said Al-Mandhari	Oman	1:59.26	
48	6	Khalid Mohhamed Hazazi	Saudi Arabia	2:00.02	
49	5	Qais Al-Rawahi	Oman	2:00.20	
50	3	Charlton Sunter	Netherlands Antilles	2:03.26	
51	1	Moussargue Tchoumgoyo	Chad	2:06.93	
	5	Md Abdul Momin Mamun	Bangladesh	DNS	

=== Semifinals ===
Qualification: First 2 in each heat (Q) and the next 2 fastest (q) qualified for the final.

Rank	Heat	Name	Nationality	Time	Notes
1	2	Fred Samoei	Kenya	1:46.91	Q
2	2	Casimir Loxsom	United States	1:47.10	Q
3	2	Vyacheslav Sokolov	Russia	1:47.15	q
4	2	Teng Haining	China	1:47.27	q, PB
5	2	André Olivier	South Africa	1:47.48	
6	2	Ahmed Mainy	Morocco	1:47.54	PB
7	1	Sören Ludolph	Germany	1:47.98	Q
8	1	Lachlan Renshaw	Australia	1:48.03	Q
8	3	Lutimar Paes	Brazil	1:48.03	Q
10	3	Ryan Martin	United States	1:48.07	Q
11	3	Sajjad Moradi	Iran	1:48.10	
12	3	Mahfoud Brahimi	Algeria	1:48.11	
13	1	Rafith Rodríguez	Colombia	1:48.17	
14	2	Vitalij Kozlov	Lithuania	1:48.29	
15	1	Abdelmadjed Touil	Algeria	1:48.92	
16	1	Joe Thomas	Great Britain	1:49.04	
17	1	Tommy Granlund	Sweden	1:49.09	
18	2	James Kaan	Australia	1:49.41	
19	3	Oleksandr Osmolovych	Ukraine	1:49.46	
20	1	Anis Ananenka	Belarus	1:49.53	
21	1	Otlaadisa Segosebe	Botswana	1:49.81	PB
22	3	Cihat Ulus	Turkey	1:50.30	
23	3	Roman Fosti	Estonia	1:50.77	
24	3	Tlou Seloba	South Africa	1:53.81	

=== Final ===
Rank	Name	Nationality	Time	Notes
1st place, gold medalist(s)	Lachlan Renshaw	Australia	1:46.36	
2nd place, silver medalist(s)	Teng Haining	China	1:46.62	PB
3rd place, bronze medalist(s)	Fred Samoei	Kenya	1:46.72	
4	Casimir Loxsom	United States	1:46.73	
5	Lutimar Paes	Brazil	1:47.23	
6	Vyacheslav Sokolov	Russia	1:47.80	
7	Sören Ludolph	Germany	1:48.33	
8	Ryan Martin	United States	1:51.89	
