= Samwel Mwera =

Tanzanian middle-distance runner

Samwel Mwera Chegere (born 3 June 1985) is a Tanzanian middle distance runner who specializes in the 800 and 1500 metres. He was born in Musoma.

== Competition record ==
Year	Competition	Venue	Position	Event	Notes
Representing Tanzania
2001	World Youth Championships	Debrecen, Hungary	5th	1500 m	3:44.85
2002	World Junior Championships	Kingston, Jamaica	3rd	1500 m	3:41.75
2003	All-Africa Games	Abuja, Nigeria	1st	800 m	1:46.13
2003	All-Africa Games	Abuja, Nigeria	6th	1500 m	3:45.76
2003	Afro-Asian Games	Hyderabad, India	3rd	800 m	1:47.98
2004	World Indoor Championships	Budapest, Hungary	–	800 m	DQ
2004	Olympic Games	Athens, Greece	4th (h)	800 m	1:45.30
2005	World Championships	Helsinki, Finland	–	800 m	DQ
2006	Commonwealth Games	Melbourne, Australia	–	800 m	DQ
2007	World Championships	Osaka, Japan	25th (h)	800 m	1:46.24
2008	Olympic Games	Beijing, China	54th (h)	800 m	1:50.67

=== Personal bests ===
- 800 metres - 1:45.28 min (2005)
- 1500 metres - 3:35.42 min (2004)
- 5000 metres - 13:29.14 min (2005)
