= 2004 World Junior Championships in Athletics – Men's 800 metres =

The men's 800 metres event at the 2004 World Junior Championships in Athletics was held in Grosseto, Italy, at Stadio Olimpico Carlo Zecchini on 13, 14 and 16 July.

== Medalists ==
Gold	Majid Saeed Sultan; Qatar
Silver	Alfred Kirwa Yego; Kenya
Bronze	Selahattin Çobanoğlu; Turkey

== Results ==
=== Final ===
16 July

Rank	Name	Nationality	Time	Notes
1st place, gold medalist(s)	Majid Saeed Sultan	Qatar	1:47.33	
2nd place, silver medalist(s)	Alfred Kirwa Yego	Kenya	1:47.39	
3rd place, bronze medalist(s)	Selahattin Çobanoğlu	Turkey	1:47.71	
4	Kévin Hautcœur	France	1:48.37	
5	Elijah Boit	Kenya	1:48.76	
6	Bocar Kane	France	1:49.08	
7	Bonolo Maboa	South Africa	1:49.85	
8	Michael Rimmer	United Kingdom	1:50.59	

=== Semifinals ===
14 July

==== Semifinal 1 ====
Rank	Name	Nationality	Time	Notes
1	Selahattin Çobanoğlu	Turkey	1:49.70	Q
2	Bocar Kane	France	1:49.86	Q
3	Elijah Boit	Kenya	1:49.98	Q
4	Michael Rimmer	United Kingdom	1:50.05	q
5	Thomas Matthys	Belgium	1:50.41	
6	Reuben Twijukye	Uganda	1:50.51	
7	Alexandr Osmolovich	Ukraine	1:51.18	
8	Kleberson Davide	Brazil	1:51.97	

==== Semifinal 2 ====
Rank	Name	Nationality	Time	Notes
1	Alfred Kirwa Yego	Kenya	1:49.02	Q
2	Majid Saeed Sultan	Qatar	1:49.53	Q
3	Bonolo Maboa	South Africa	1:49.53	Q
4	Kévin Hautcœur	France	1:49.58	q
5	Diego Gomes	Brazil	1:50.63	
6	Jozef Repčík	Slovakia	1:50.79	
7	Timothy Harris	United States	1:50.97	
8	René Bauschinger	Germany	1:51.30	

=== Heats ===
13 July

==== Heat 1 ====
Rank	Name	Nationality	Time	Notes
1	Alfred Kirwa Yego	Kenya	1:48.96	Q
2	Bonolo Maboa	South Africa	1:49.31	Q
3	Majid Saeed Sultan	Qatar	1:49.34	q
4	Kleberson Davide	Brazil	1:50.44	q
5	Dávid Takács	Hungary	1:50.98	
6	Sifiso Magagula	Swaziland	2:01.92	

==== Heat 2 ====
Rank	Name	Nationality	Time	Notes
1	Reuben Twijukye	Uganda	1:49.50	Q
2	Kévin Hautcœur	France	1:49.88	Q
3	Diego Gomes	Brazil	1:49.93	q
4	Timothy Harris	United States	1:50.75	q
5	Chris Gowell	United Kingdom	1:51.31	

==== Heat 3 ====
Rank	Name	Nationality	Time	Notes
1	Elijah Boit	Kenya	1:51.77	Q
2	René Bauschinger	Germany	1:51.96	Q
3	Luis Alberto Marco	Spain	1:52.85	
4	Sydney Mafologela	South Africa	1:52.94	
5	Kamil Gawrys	Poland	1:53.74	
6	Ross Ridgewell	Australia	1:54.88	
7	Telva Brinkfield	French Polynesia	2:03.53	

==== Heat 4 ====
Rank	Name	Nationality	Time	Notes
1	Thomas Matthys	Belgium	1:50.98	Q
2	Jozef Repčík	Slovakia	1:51.30	Q
3	Stephens Akena	Uganda	1:51.51	
4	Werner Botha	Australia	1:51.64	
5	Rachid Omar Alaya	Tunisia	1:52.42	
6	Marcus Mayes	United States	1:53.18	
7	Xavier D'Aumale	Monaco	2:08.65	

==== Heat 5 ====
Rank	Name	Nationality	Time	Notes
1	Selahattin Çobanoğlu	Turkey	1:49.19	Q
2	Alexandr Osmolovich	Ukraine	1:49.58	Q
3	Michael Rimmer	United Kingdom	1:49.64	q
4	Bocar Kane	France	1:50.72	q
5	Florin Gania	Romania	1:50.89	
6	Fabio Bortolotti	Italy	1:56.63	

== Participation ==
According to an unofficial count, 31 athletes from 23 countries participated in the event.

- Australia (2)
- Belgium (1)
- Brazil (2)
- France (2)
- French Polynesia (1)
- Germany (1)
- Hungary (1)
- Italy (1)
- Kenya (2)
- Monaco (1)
- Poland (1)
- Qatar (1)
- Romania (1)
- Slovakia (1)
- South Africa (2)
- Spain (1)
- Swaziland (1)
- Tunisia (1)
- Turkey (1)
- Uganda (2)
- Ukraine (1)
- United Kingdom (2)
- United States (2)
