= Muduluni =

- Location within Limpopo Location within South Africa
- Coordinates: 23.07°S 29.65°E
- Country: South Africa
- Province: Limpopo
- District: Vhembe
- Municipality: Makhado

Area
  - Total: 3.08 km^{2} (1.19 sq mi)

Population (2011)
  - Total: 2,867
  - Density: 931/km^{2} (2,410/sq mi)

Racial makeup (2011)
  - Black African: 100%

First languages (2011)
  - Venda: 76.6%
  - Sotho: 10%
  - Northern Sotho: 8%
  - Other: 5.4%
- Time zone: UTC+2 (SAST)
- Postal code (street): n/a
- PO box: n/a

Muduluni is a rural village located in the Makhado Local Municipality, Limpopo Province of South Africa. It lies some 15 km west of the main town of Louis Trichardt at the foot of the Soutpansberg Mountains.

== Notable people ==
- Mbulaeni Mulaudzi (1980 – 2014), South African Olympic middle distance runner.

== Stadium ==
In 2018, a R15.9-million grant was awarded by the National Lotteries Commission (NLC) to build a stadium. The grant was paid to Mavu Sports Development, a small NGO with no experience in developing large infrastructure projects. The NLC announced that the stadium would be named after Mbulaeni Mulaudzi and would be completed in six months.

By February 2023, only an athletics track, grass, and fencing had been laid, with acting secretary of the Zoutpansberg Development Forum (ZDF), Andries Dobi, saying that a lack of skills and corruption were the main causes of the delays in building the stadium. The Special Investigating Unit is investigating a case of corruption.
