= Lachlan Renshaw =

Australian middle-distance runner

Personal information
- Nationality: Australian
- Born: 2 April 1987 (age 39) Sydney, Australia
- Height: 1.79 m (5 ft 10 1/2 in)
- Weight: 70 kg (154 lb)

Sport
- Country: Australia
- Sport: Athletics
- Event: Middle-distance running

Achievements and titles
- Personal best: 800 metres: 1:45.66 (2011)
Medal record
Men's athletics
Representing Australia
Universiade
Gold medal – first place	2011 Shenzhen	800 m

Lachlan Renshaw (born 2 April 1987 in Sydney, Australia) is a middle-distance track and field athlete and is the 2010 Australian Champion over 800 metres. He was also the 2008 800 m national champion. He represented Australia at the 2008 Beijing Olympics, finishing sixth in his heat in a time of 1:49.19. In 2010 he competed in the 800 m at the Delhi Commonwealth Games, progressing through the rounds to the final, but was unable to start in the final due to injury.

Lachlan has also competed at the international level at the 2006 World Junior Championships (3rd in his semi-final), as well as the 2007 and 2009 World University Games, finishing fifth in the 800 m in the latter event. His personal best time for the 800 m is 1:45.73, for 1500 metres is 3:47.69, for the 400 metres is 47.33, and he also holds the Australian record for the 600 metres at 1:15.14.

Lachlan attended Sydney Grammar School and was a winner of the Open 800 m Championship event at the AAGPS Athletics Competition for four years running, setting the 800 m record of 1:50.63 in his final year of school. He was further a member of the 4 × 400 metres relay team which holds the AAGPS record.

As of 2025, Lachlan Renshaw, founder of Centrestone Jewellery Insurance

== Statistics ==
=== Personal bests ===
Event	Time	Competition	Venue	Date
400 metres	47.33	Sydney Allcomers	Sydney, Australia	
600 metres	1:15.14	Sydney Allcomers	Sydney, Australia	
800 metres	1:45.66	Melbourne Track Classic	Melbourne, Australia	
1500 metres	3:42.13	Solihull British Milers Club	Solihull, England	

=== Major competition record ===
Year	Competition	Venue	Position	Event	Notes
Representing Australia
2006	World Junior Championships	Beijing, China	3rd (sf)	800m	1:48.26
2006	World Junior Championships	Beijing, China	—	4 × 400 m relay	DQ
2007	Universiade	Bangkok, Thailand	5th (h)	800 metres	1:48.92
2008	Olympic Games	Beijing, China	6th (h)	800 metres	1:49.19
2009	Universiade	Belgrade, Serbia	5th	800 metres	1:48.27
2010	Commonwealth Games	New Delhi, India	4th SF, DNS Final (injury)	800 metres	
2011	Universiade	Shenzhen, China	1st	800 metres	1:46.36

=== National titles ===
- 800 metres: 2008, 2010 (2)
