= Selahattin Çobanoğlu =

Turkish athletics competitor

Personal information
- Nationality: Turkish
- Born: 20 August 1985 (age 40) Mersin, Turkey
- Height: 1.74 m (5 ft 9 in)
- Weight: 58 kg (128 lb)

Sport
- Country: Turkey
- Sport: Athletics
- Event(s): 400m, 800m

Achievements and titles
- Personal best: 400m: 48.05 (Konya) 2004 800m: 1:46.92 (Heusden-Zolder) 2004 1000m: 2:24.37 (Istanbul) 2003 800m indoor: 1:50.13 (Peania) 2006
Medal record
Men's Athletics
Representing Turkey
Universiade
Silver medal – second place	2005 Izmir	800m
World Junior Championships
Bronze medal – third place	2004 Grosseto	800m

Selahattin Çobanoğlu (born 20 August 1985 in Mersin) is a Turkish sprinter and middle distance runner. He usually competed at the 800 metres events.

Çobanoglu represented his country at the 2004 Summer Olympics in Athens, Greece. He was eliminated in the first round at the 800 metres competition. He won a silver medal at the 2005 Summer Universiade held in their country.

Çobanoğlu holds the Turkish record at the 600 metres with 1:17.23.

His brother Utku Çobanoglu is a sprint and middle-distance runner like himself.
