= Jimmy Adar =

Ugandan middle-distance runner

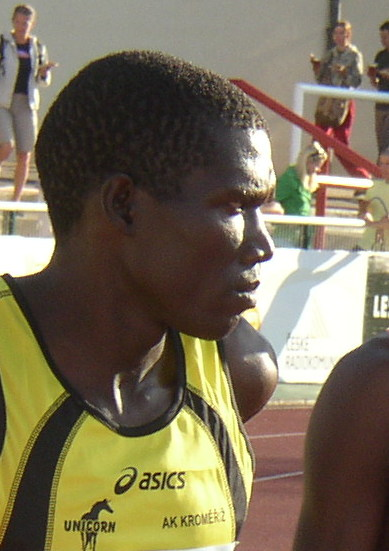
Jimmy Adar at the 2010 Josef Odložil Memorial in Prague

Jimmy Adar (born 1 November 1987 in Lira) is a Ugandan middle-distance runner. He has represented his country at the Commonwealth Games twice, running in the heats at the 2006 Commonwealth Games before going on to finish fifth in the final of the 800 metres at the 2010 Commonwealth Games. He has also competed at the African Games in 2007 and 2015, the African Championships in Athletics in 2008 and 2010, and was a bronze medallist at the 2005 African Junior Athletics Championships.

He holds personal bests of 1:46.36 minutes for the 800 metres and 3:40.47 minutes for the 1500 metres. He is a seven-time national champion, winning the 800 m in 2004, an 800/1500 m double in 2005 and 2006, another 800 m title in 2008, and a 1500 m title in 2014.

== International competitions ==
Year	Competition	Venue	Position	Event	Notes
2005	African Junior Championships	Tunis, Tunisia	3rd	800 m	1:48.79
2006	World Junior Championships	Beijing, China	5th (sf)	800 m	1:49.69
2006	World Junior Championships	Beijing, China	11th	1500 m	3:48.16
2006	Commonwealth Games	Melbourne, Australia	10th (h)	800 m	1:49.33
2006	Commonwealth Games	Melbourne, Australia	14th (h)	1500 m	3:43.20
2007	All-Africa Games	Algiers, Algeria	16th (sf)	800 m	1:57.95
2008	African Championships	Addis Ababa, Ethiopia	11th (sf)	800 m	1:51.13
2010	Commonwealth Games	New Delhi, India	5th	800 m	1:49.57
2010	Commonwealth Games	New Delhi, India	7th (h)	1500 m	3:45.98
2010	African Championships	Nairobi, Kenya	10th (sf)	800 m	1:50.30
2010	African Championships	Nairobi, Kenya	10th	1500 m	3:41.00
2015	African Games	Brazzaville, Republic of the Congo	16th (h)	800 m	1:52.34
2015	African Games	Brazzaville, Republic of the Congo	8th	4 × 400 m relay	3:11.53

== National titles ==
- Ugandan Athletics Championships
  - 800 m: 2004, 2005, 2006, 2008
  - 1500 m: 2005, 2006, 2014
