= Michael Rimmer =

English middle-distance runner

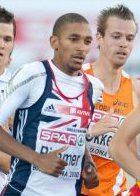
- Rimmer during the 800 metres final at the 2010 European Championships

Personal information
- Born: 3 February 1986 (age 40) Southport, England
- Height: 182 cm (6 ft 0 in)
- Weight: 66 kg (146 lb)

Sport
- Sport: Athletics
- Event: 800 metres
- Club: Liverpool Pembroke & Sefton H&AC

Achievements and titles
- Personal best: 800 metres: 1:43.89
Medal record
European Championships
Silver medal – second place	2010 Barcelona	800 m

Michael Rimmer (born 3 February 1986) is an English former middle-distance runner who competed at three Olympic Games in 2008, 2012 and 2016.

== Biography ==
Rimmer was born in Southport. Originally a member of Southport Waterloo AC, he changed clubs to rivals Liverpool Pembroke Sefton, who he still now races with. He attended Christ The King catholic high school and broke numerous records in school mile races held at Victoria park, Southport. Michael was also a former sports scholar at Liverpool John Moores University.

He finished 8th in the 800m final at the 2006 European Athletics Championships in Gothenburg. Finished 2nd in his first European Cup in Munich (2007). He is the first male 800 m runner in British history to win national titles at under 15, 17, 20 and as a senior athlete.

His personal best is 1:43.89 (lowering his previous mark by over half a second) which he set in Rieti, Italy, in 2010. This places him 6th on the "UK all time list" and is the fastest by any British athlete in over 17 years.

As he won the Senior title in 2008, he was selected to represent Team GB at the Beijing Olympics. Rimmer's build-up to the Games was disrupted by food poisoning, which he picked up at the holding camp in Macau. The Southport runner comfortably came through his first-ever Olympic race in 1:47.61, despite having lost almost 7 pounds (3.2 kg) because of his illness.

In August 2009, Rimmer competed in the World Championships, held in Berlin. Rimmer looked promising throughout the heats of the 800 m, and after squeezing through his previous round he was well down the field in the semi-final in a time of 1:46.77. In July 2010, he became the first male 800 m runner in history to win five consecutive national senior titles in Birmingham. He won his first major championship medal in the European Championships in Barcelona, a silver medal behind Marcin Lewandowski with a 1:47.17.

Rimmer was a seven-times British 800 metres champion after winning the British AAA Championships title in 2006 and the British Athletics Championships from 2007 to 2010 and from 2013 to 2014.

Throughout his career Rimmer adhered to a superstition of always wearing a t-shirt below his racing vest.

== Competition record ==
Year	Competition	Venue	Position	Event	Notes
Representing Great Britain and England
2004	World Junior Championships	Grosseto, Italy	8th	800m	1:50.59
2004	World Junior Championships	Grosseto, Italy	5th	4 × 400 m relay	3:07.02
2004	Commonwealth Youth Games	Bendigo, Australia	3rd	800 m	1:51.20
2005	European Junior Championships	Kaunas, Lithuania	8th	800 m	1:53.16
2006	European Championships	Gothenburg, Sweden	8th	800 m	1:47.66
2007	World Championships	Osaka, Japan	20th (sf)	800 m	1:47.39
2008	Olympic Games	Beijing, China	22nd (sf)	800 m	1:48.07
2009	World Championships	Berlin, Germany	16th (sf)	800 m	1:46.77
2010	European Championships	Barcelona, Spain	2nd	800 m	1:47.17
2011	World Championships	Daegu, South Korea	23rd (h)	800 m	1:47.11
2012	Olympic Games	London, United Kingdom	41st (h)	800 m	1:49.05
2013	European Indoor Championships	Gothenburg, Sweden	7th	800 m	1:51.04
2013	World Championships	Moscow, Russia	19th (sf)	800 m	1:47.06
2014	Commonwealth Games	Glasgow, United Kingdom	7th	800 m	1:46.71
2014	European Championships	Zürich, Switzerland	18th (h)	800 m	1:48.51
2015	World Championships	Beijing, China	34th (h)	800 m	1:48.70
2016	Olympic Games	Rio de Janeiro, Brazil	23rd (sf)	800 m	1:46.80
