= Gary Reed (athlete) =

Canadian retired middle distance runner (born 1981)

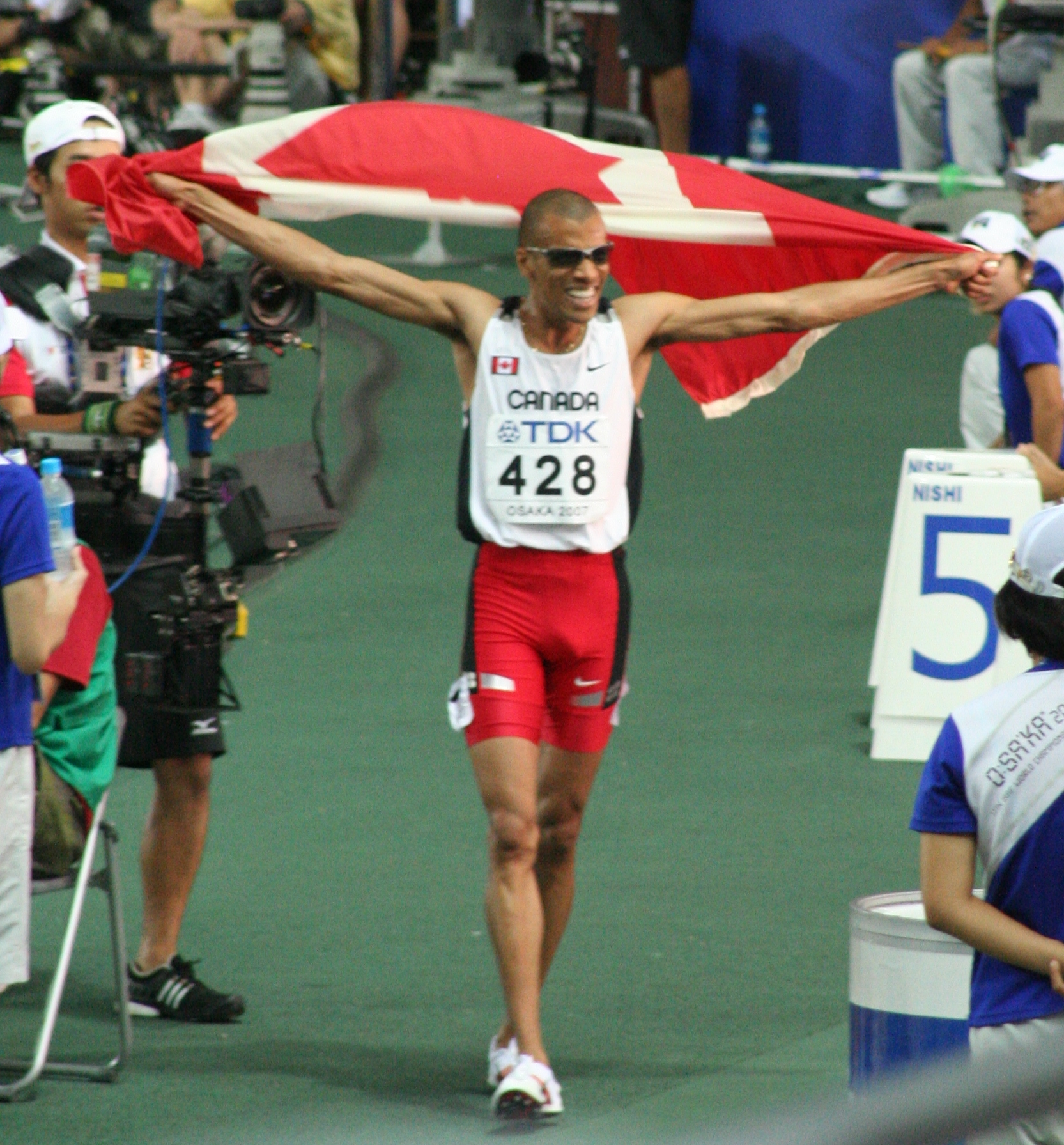
- Reed at the 2007 World Championships in Athletics.

Medal record

Representing Canada

Men's athletics

World Championships
Silver medal – second place	2007 Osaka	800 m

Gary Reed (born 25 October 1981) is a Canadian retired middle distance runner. On September 2, 2007, he won the silver medal in the 2007 World Championships in Athletics in Osaka, Japan, with a time of 1.47.10. Reed was born in Corpus Christi, Texas, and currently resides in Kamloops, British Columbia.

Reed announced his retirement from competitive athletics December 13, 2010, at only 29 years old. He retires as the former 800-metre Canadian record holder, a six-time Canadian Champion (2009, 2008, 2007, 2005, 2004, 2003), and a Team Canada member at two Olympics (2004, 2008) and Six World Championships (2001, 2003,(2004 Indoor)2005, 2007, 2009). His best performances include a silver medal at the 2007 World Championships and a 4th-place finish at the 2008 Olympic Games in Beijing, China.

== See also ==
- Canadian records in track and field
