= Samson Ngoepe =

South African middle-distance runner

Mabu Joseph Samson Ngoepe
Personal information
- Nationality: South African
- Born: 28 January 1985 (age 41) Polokwane, Limpopo Province, South Africa
- Height: 1.80 m (5 ft 11 in)
- Weight: 60 kg (130 lb; 9.4 st)

Sport
- Sport: Running

Samson Ngoepe (born 28 January 1985) is a South African runner who specializes in the 800 metres. He is currently coached by Charl Naude.

He competed in the 800 metres event at the 2008 Olympic Games, disappointingly not reaching the final.

He qualified to run the 800 metres at the 2009 World Championships in Athletics held in Berlin, Germany, from 15 to 23 August 2009 by running a personal best time of 1:45.17 min in Ostrava, Czech Republic, on June 17 of 2009. At these championships he reached the semi-finals of the competition.

== Personal bests ==
- 800 metres – 1:45.17 min (2009) in Ostrava
- 1500 metres – 3:40.40 min (2008) in Nijmegen

His personal best time of 1:45.17 minutes, was achieved in June 2009 in Ostrava.

== Competition record ==
Year	Competition	Venue	Position	Event	Notes
Representing South Africa
2005	World Youth Championships	Marrakesh, Morocco	2nd	800 m	1:48.57
2007	All-Africa Games	Algiers, Algeria	12th (sf)	800 m	1:49.80
2008	African Championships	Addis Ababa, Ethiopia	7th	800 m	1:49.22
2008	Olympic Games	Beijing, China	28th (h)	800 m	1:47.42
2009	World Championships	Berlin, Germany	18th (sf)	800 m	1:49.03
