= Li Xiangyu =

Chinese middle-distance runner

Li Xiangyu (Chinese: 李翔宇; born 21 October 1985) is a Chinese middle-distance runner who specializes in the 800 metres.

He finished ninth at the 2005 Summer Universiade. He also won the 2005 National Games and the 2006 National Championships. He represented his country at the 2008 Summer Olympics. Li retained his National Games title with a win in the 800 m at the 11th National Games in 2009.

His personal best time is 1:46.45 minutes, achieved in July 2006 in Lignano Sabbiadoro.

== Biography ==
Li was born 21 October 1985 in Shuangyashan, Heilongjiang, and is from Shanxi. He began attending the Tsinghua University School of Economics and Management in 2002. He competed in the 2004 Chinese Athletics Championships in Hefei where his time of 1:50.01 in the 800 metres earned him the gold medal. At the 2005 Chinese Athletics Championships, Li received first place in the 800 metres with a time of 1:48.21. After winning the competition, he kneeled on the ground to kiss the track.

During the 2006 Chinese Athletics Championships at the Yutong International Sports Center, Li received a gold meal in the 800 metres. He had a time of 1:46.67, which set a national record. During the Good Luck Beijing China Athletics Open held in May 2008, Li received a gold medal in the 800 metres, clocking 1:48.39. Li competed in the 800 metres event at the 2008 Summer Olympics and did not advance past the first round, having placed fifth in his heat. During the 2009 Chinese Athletics Championships, Li received first place with a time of 1:49.20. Li's coach in 2009 was Cao Zhenshui.
