= Rabii Doukkana =

French long-distance runner (born 1987)

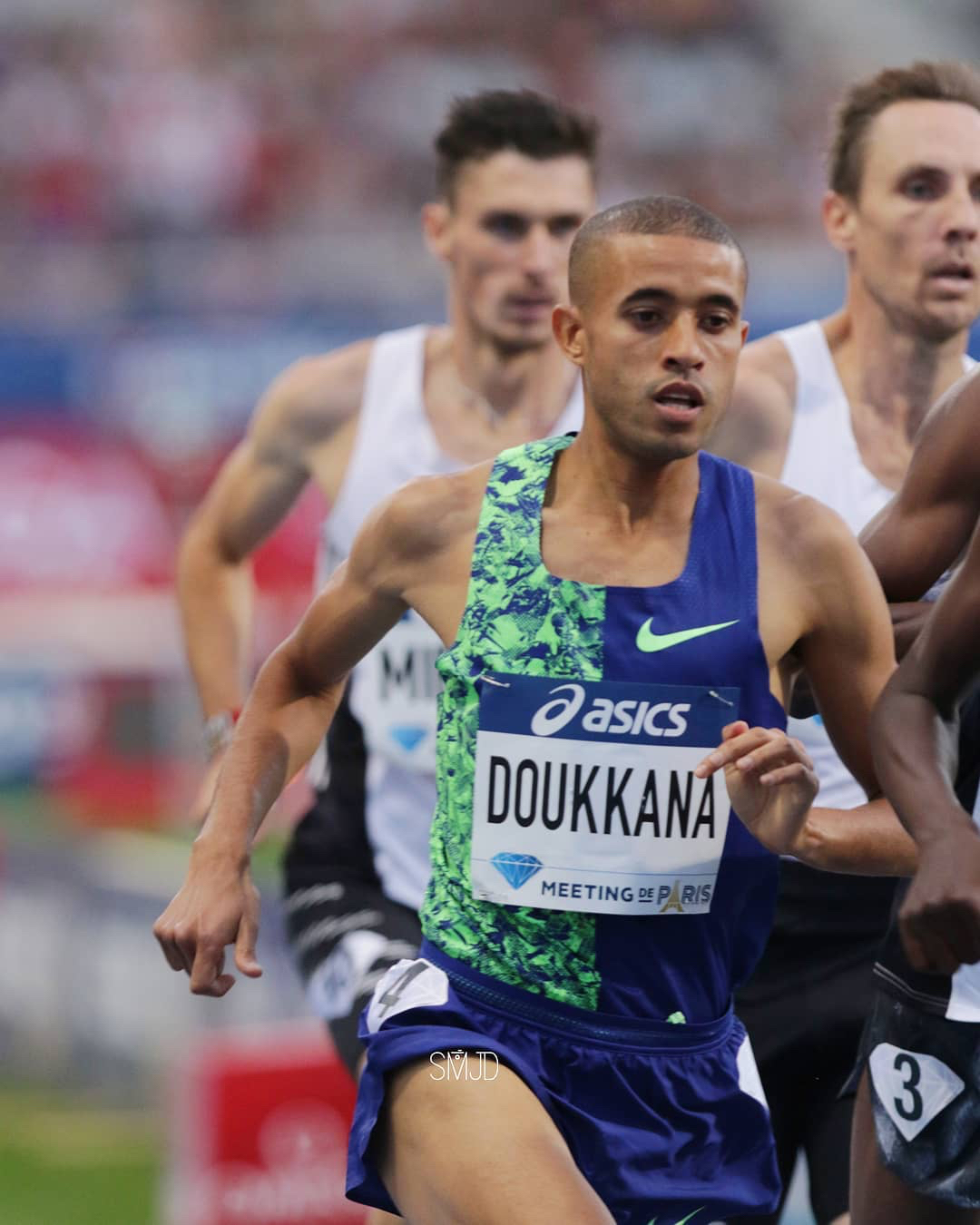
- Doukkana in 2019

Personal information
- Nationality: French
- Born: 6 December 1987 (age 38) Rabat, Morocco
- Height: 171 cm (5 ft 7 in)
- Weight: 54 kg (119 lb)

Sport
- Country: France
- Sport: Athletics (track and field)
- Events: 1500m, 3000m, 5000m
- Club: US Créteil Athlétisme

Achievements and titles
- Personal bests: Outdoor; 800 m: 1:47.13 (Soria 2006); 1500 m: 3:33.11 (Paris 2019); 3000 m: 7:53.09 (Montgeron 2018); 5000 m: 13:15.59 (Carquefou 2018); Indoor; 1500 m: 3:40.84 (Metz 2020); 3000 m: 7:51.30 (Liévin 2020)

Rabii Doukkana (born 6 December 1987) is a Moroccan-French middle and long-distance runner. He gained French nationality in 2019.
