= Abdoulaye Wagne =

Senegalese middle-distance runner (born 1981)

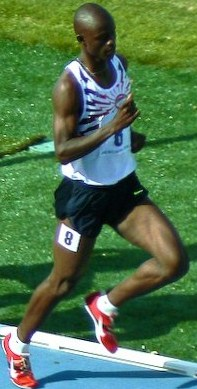
Wagne in Pescara

Abdoulaye Wagne (born October 2, 1981, in Dakar, Senegal) is a Senegalese Olympic athlete. He competes primarily in the 800 meters with a personal best of 1:45.08.

== Competition record ==
Year	Competition	Venue	Position	Event	Notes
Representing Senegal
2003	World Championships	Paris, France	25th (h)	800 m	1:47.64
2003	All-Africa Games	Abuja, Nigeria	8th	800 m	1:49.79
2004	African Championships	Brazzaville, Republic of the Congo	8th (h)	800 m	1:49.48
2004	African Championships	Brazzaville, Republic of the Congo	7th	4 × 400 m relay	3:10.61
2004	Olympic Games	Athens, Greece	50th (h)	800 m	1:47.95
2006	African Championships	Bambous, Mauritius	5th	800 m	1:47.44
2007	All-Africa Games	Algiers, Algeria	4th	800 m	1:46.12
2007	All-Africa Games	Algiers, Algeria	6th	4 × 400 m relay	3:08.35
2007	World Championships	Osaka, Japan	18th (sf)	800 m	1:46.49
2008	World Indoor Championships	Valencia, Spain	16th (sf)	800 m	1:49.49
2008	Olympic Games	Beijing, China	31st (h)	800 m	1:47.50
2009	World Championships	Berlin, Germany	32nd (h)	800 m	1:48.22
2009	Jeux de la Francophonie	Beirut, Lebanon	2nd	800 m	1:47.48
