= Justus Koech =

Kenyan middle-distance runner

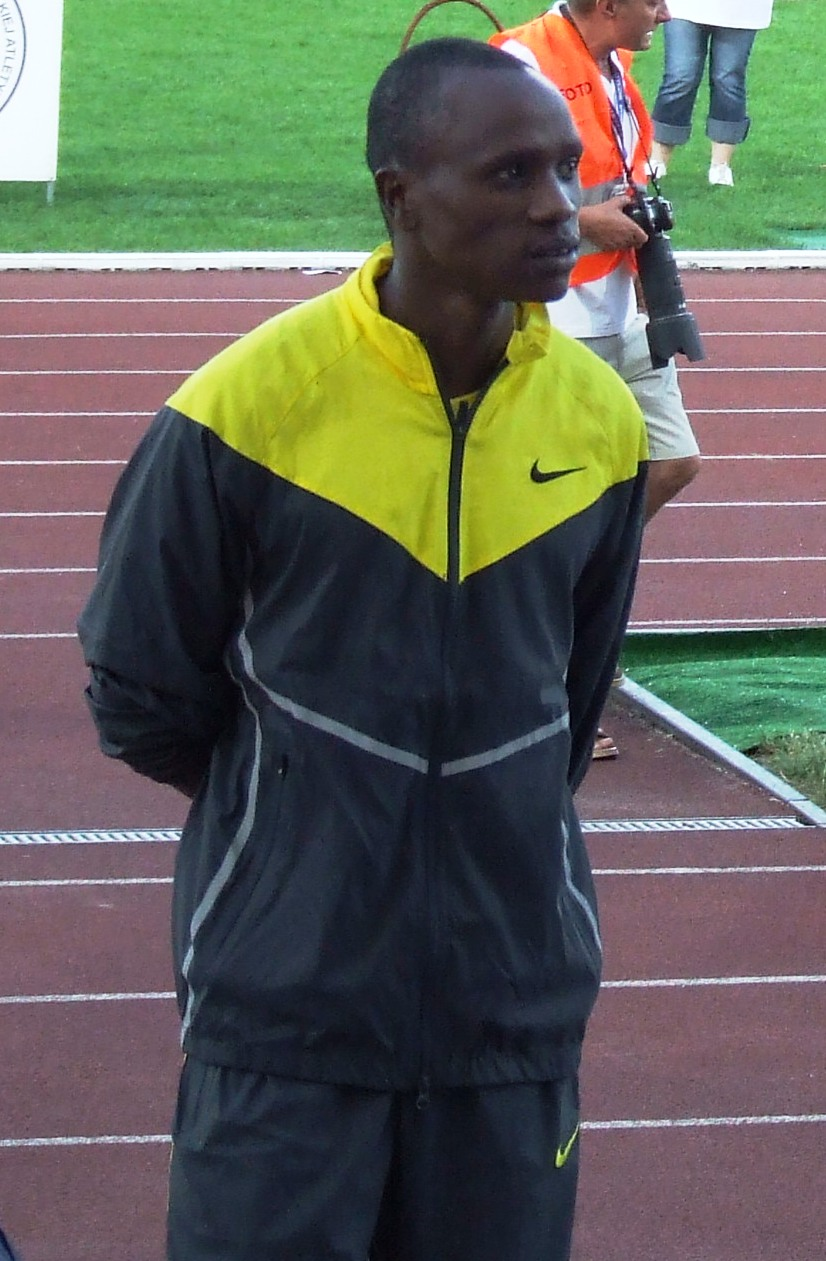
Justus Koech, Bydgoszcz 2007

Justus Koech (born 19 March 1980 in Uasin Gishu) is a Kenyan middle-distance runner who specializes in the 800 metres.

He finished sixth at the 2003 World Championships in Paris and won a bronze medal at the 2003 All-Africa Games in Abuja.

His personal best time is 1:44.16 minutes, achieved in July 2003 in Nairobi.
