= Nadjim Manseur =

Algerian middle-distance runner

Personal information
- Nationality: Algeria
- Born: 8 June 1988 (age 38) Béjaïa, Algeria
- Height: 1.80 m (5 ft 11 in)
- Weight: 73 kg (161 lb)

Sport
- Sport: Athletics
- Event: Middle distance running

Achievements and titles
- Personal best: 800 m: 1:44.75 (2008)

Nadjim Manseur (Arabic: نجيم منصر; born June 8, 1988, in Béjaïa) is an Algerian middle-distance runner, who specialized in the 800 metres. In 2008, he set his personal best time of 1:44.75, by finishing fourth at the sixth meet of the AF Golden League in Rome, Italy.

Manseur represented Algeria at the 2008 Summer Olympics in Beijing, where he competed for the men's 800 metres, along with his compatriot Nabil Madi. He finished eighth in the final round of this event by more than a second behind Madi, outside his personal best of 1:47.19.
