= Mbulaeni Mulaudzi =

South African middle-distance runner

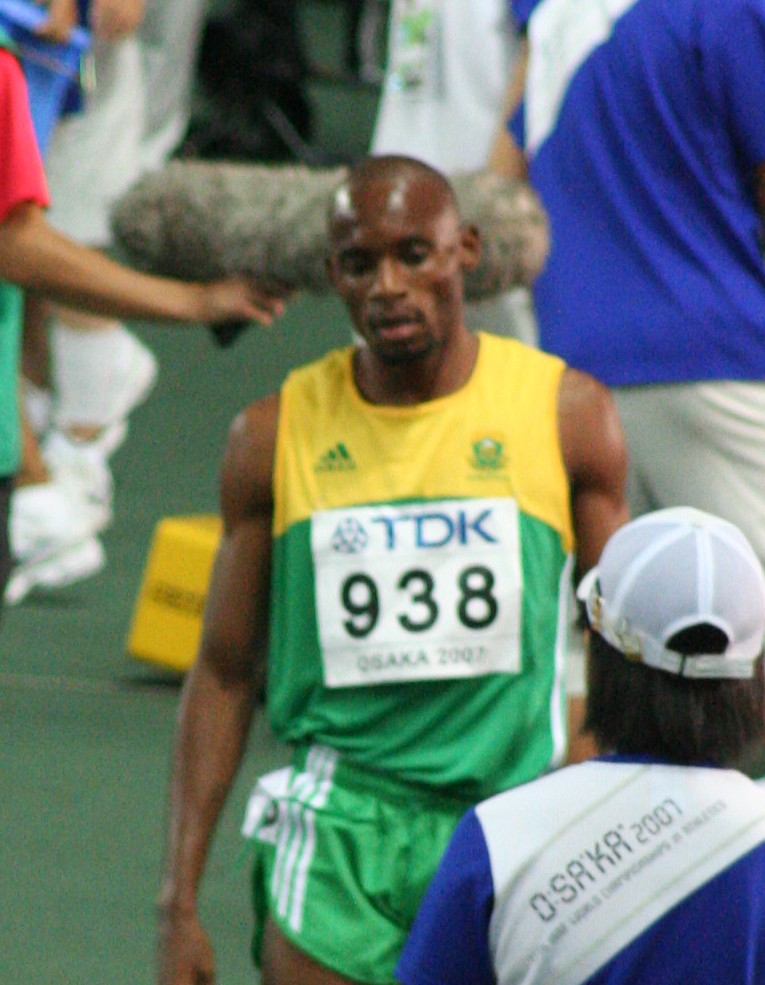
- Mulaudzi at the 2007 World Championships

Personal information
- Nationality: South African
- Born: 8 September 1980 Muduluni, South Africa
- Died: 24 October 2014 (aged 34) eMalahleni, South Africa

Sport
- Sport: Track
- Event: 800 metres

Achievements and titles
- Personal bests: 800 metres: 1:42.86; 1500 metres: 3:38.5
Medal record
Men's athletics
Representing South Africa
Olympic Games
Silver medal – second place	2004 Athens	800 m
World Championships
Gold medal – first place	2009 Berlin	800 m
Bronze medal – third place	2003 Paris	800 m
World Indoor Championships
Gold medal – first place	2004 Budapest	800 m
Silver medal – second place	2006 Moskva	800 m
Silver medal – second place	2008 Valencia	800 m
All-Africa Games
Silver medal – second place	2003 Abuja	800 m
Silver medal – second place	2007 Algiers	800 m
African Championships
Silver medal – second place	2000 Algiers	800 m
Bronze medal – third place	2002 Radès	800 m
Commonwealth Games
Gold medal – first place	2002 Manchester	800 m
Representing Africa
IAAF World Cup
Bronze medal – third place	2006 Athens	800 m

Mbulaeni Tongai Mulaudzi OIB (8 September 1980 – 24 October 2014) was a South African middle-distance runner, and the 2009 world champion in the men's 800 metres.

His first global medal was a silver at the 2000 African Championships in Athletics. He later won a bronze at the 2003 World Championships in Athletics, which came a year after his victory at the 2002 Commonwealth Games. Mulaudzi was a gold medallist at the 2004 IAAF World Indoor Championships and won two further silver medals at the competition in 2006 and 2008. He was a runner-up at continental level on three occasions, taking the 800 m silver at the African Championships in Athletics in 2000 and at the All-Africa Games in 2003 and 2007. He carried the flag for his native country at the opening ceremony of the 2004 Summer Olympics, where he became an Olympic silver medallist.

His personal best for the 800 m was 1:42.86 minutes. He ranked first on time in the 2006 and 2007 seasons, becoming the first Black South African to achieve such a feat.

== Career ==
Born in Muduluni, Transvaal Province, he had his first success as a teenager at the 1999 African Junior Athletics Championships, where he won the 800 m title.

His first senior international medal was a silver at the 2000 African Championships in Athletics. He competed at the 2001 World Championships in Athletics and finished sixth in his first global final. At his first Commonwealth Games, Mulaudzi was first past the finish line to become the 2002 Commonwealth champion in the 800 m. He won a bronze medal at the 2003 World Championships the following year, in addition to a silver medal from the 2003 All-Africa Games.

He came to prominence in 2004, when he won at the World Indoor Championships and reached the podium at the 2004 Athens Olympics to win an Olympic silver medal. That year he was inducted into the University of Pretoria Sport Hall of fame.

In the 2006 season he ranked number one in the world for the season – South Africa's first black athlete to do so. He was made South African Sportsman of the Year in recognition of this. At the 2006 World Indoor Championships he won a silver medal, and he repeated the feat two years later at the 2008 edition. He represented South Africa at the 2008 Beijing Olympics but was knocked out of the 800 m at the semi-final stage.

He made the 800 m final at four consecutive World Athletics Championships, and won his first gold medal in the event in 2009. He set a lifetime best of 1:42.86 minutes later that year at the Rieti Meeting. He returned to competition in 2010 with a win at the Meeting Grand Prix IAAF de Dakar.

== Death ==
Mulaudzi died in a car crash on 24 October 2014 at the age of 34. He was en route to an Athletics South Africa athletics meeting when his car overturned. His death was confirmed by his manager, Peet van Zyl, who said: "Mr Mulaudzi was surely one of the most decorated track athletes that South Africa has ever seen and unfortunately never had the recognition from the federation for all his achievements, so it is indeed a sad day." The President of South Africa, Jacob Zuma, noted his death, saying that he was one of the nation's most talented athletes. Presidential spokesperson Mac Maharaj mirrored this, saying that the nation had lost a hero and that Mulaudzi had flown the South African flag through his athletics. The International Association of Athletics Federations, the governing body for the sport, said it was "deeply saddened" to hear of Mulaudzi's death. The International Olympic Committee expressed sadness and sympathy towards the sports family of South Africa and Mulaudzi's friends and family. South African athletes Caster Semenya and Khotso Mokoena used Twitter to express their emotions following Mulaudzi's death. Semenya said: "Just lost a brother, a friend very good friend! May your soul rest in peace Mbulayeni Mulaudzi! I love you man will always love you Champ!" and Mokoena said: "I've lost a brother, a friend, and a national hero! Sad news to my soul..."

== Personal bests ==
- 800 metres – 1:42.86 min (2009)
- 800 metres (indoor) – 1:44.91 min (2008)
- 1000 metres – 2:15.86 min (2007)
- 1500 metres – 3:38.55 min (2008)

== Honours ==
Mulaudzi was awarded the Order of Ikhamanga in bronze (posthumously) in 2015.

== Competition record ==
Year	Competition	Venue	Position	Notes
1999	African Junior Championships	Tunis, Tunisia	1st	800 metres
2000	African Championships	Algiers, Algeria	2nd	1:46.28
2001	World Championships	Edmonton, Canada	6th	1:45.01
2002	Commonwealth Games	Manchester, United Kingdom	1st	1:46.32
2002	African Championships	Radès, Tunisia	3rd	1:46.20
2003	World Championships	Paris, France	3rd	1:44.90
2003	IAAF World Athletics Final	Monte Carlo, Monaco	5th	
2003	All-Africa Games	Abuja, Nigeria	2nd	1:46.44
2004	World Indoor Championships	Budapest, Hungary	1st	1:45.71
2004	Summer Olympics	Athens, Greece	2nd	1:44.61
2004	IAAF World Athletics Final	Monte Carlo, Monaco	5th	
2005	World Championships	Helsinki, Finland	12th (semis)	1:45.73
2005	IAAF World Athletics Final	Monte Carlo, Monaco	5th	
2006	World Indoor Championships	Moscow, Russia	2nd	1:47.16
2006	African Championships	Bambous, Mauritius	6th	1:47.94
2006	IAAF World Athletics Final	Stuttgart, Germany	1st	
2006	IAAF World Cup	Athens, Greece	3rd	1:45.14
2007	All-Africa Games	Algiers, Algeria	2nd	1:45.54
2007	World Championships	Osaka, Japan	7th	1:47.52
2007	IAAF World Athletics Final	Stuttgart, Germany	2nd	
2008	World Indoor Championships	Valencia, Spain	2nd	1:44.91
2008	Summer Olympics	Beijing, China	11th (semis)	1:46.24
2008	IAAF World Athletics Final	Stuttgart, Germany	6th	
2009	World Championships	Berlin, Germany	1st	1:45.29
2009	IAAF World Athletics Final	Thessaloniki, Greece	3rd	

Olympic Games
Preceded by Alexander Heath	Flagbearer for South Africa; Athens 2004	Succeeded by Alexander Heath
