= Richard Kiplagat =

Personal information
- Born: 3 May 1984 (age 42)

Sport
- Country: Kenya
- Sport: Athletics
- Event: Middle-distance running
Medal record
Commonwealth Games
Silver medal – second place	2010 Delhi	800 m

Richard Kiplagat (born 3 May 1984) is a Kenyan former athlete who specialised in middle-distance running.

Kiplagat, who comes from Eldoret, competed mainly as a 800 metres runner. In 2008 he competed at the IAAF World Indoor Championships in Valencia, where he was disqualified for running outside of his lane. He qualified for the 2008 IAAF World Athletics Final in Stuttgart and came seventh in the 800 metres race. In 2010 he won a silver medal in the 800 metres at the Commonwealth Games in Delhi, with Kenya sweeping the podium for the first time in the event.
