= Mahamoud Farah =

Djiboutian middle-distance runner

Mahamoud Farah (born 4 September 1988) is a Djiboutian middle-distance runner who specializes in the 800 and 1500 metres.

He competed at the 2007 World Championships and the 2008 Olympic Games without progressing to the second round.

His personal best times are:

- 800 metres - 1:47.53 min (2007)
- 1500 metres - 3:39.29 min (2008)
