= David Rudisha =

Kenyan middle-distance runner (born 1988)

David Rudisha MBS
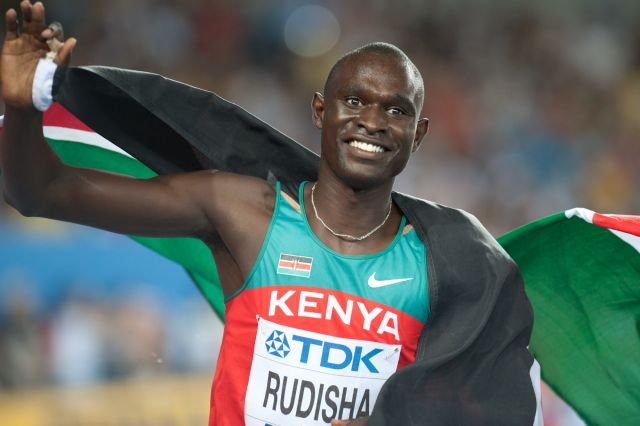
- Rudisha at the 2011 World Championships in Athletics in Daegu, South Korea

Personal information
- Born: David Lekuta Rudisha; 17 December 1988 (age 37) Kilgoris, Narok County, Kenya
- Height: 1.90 m (6 ft 3 in)
- Weight: 76 kg (168 lb)

Sport
- Country: Kenya
- Sport: Track and field
- Event: 800 metres

Achievements and titles
- Personal bests: 400 m: 45.50 (Sydney 2010); 500 m: 57.69 WB (Note: Although, this was a road race and the course was slightly downhill for the first 100m.) (Newcastle 2016); 600 m: 1:13.10 Area Best (Birmingham 2016); 800 m: 1:40.91 WR, OR (London 2012); 1000 m: 2:19.43 (Ostrava 2017)
Medal record
Men's athletics
Representing Kenya
Olympic Games
Gold medal – first place	2012 London	800 m
Gold medal – first place	2016 Rio de Janeiro	800 m
World Championships
Gold medal – first place	2011 Daegu	800 m
Gold medal – first place	2015 Beijing	800 m
Diamond League
First place	2010	800 m
First place	2011	800 m
World Junior Championships
Gold medal – first place	2006 Beijing	800 m
Commonwealth Games
Silver medal – second place	2014 Glasgow	800 m
African Championships
Gold medal – first place	2008 Addis Ababa	800 m
Gold medal – first place	2010 Nairobi	800 m
Representing Africa
Continental Cup
Gold medal – first place	2010 Split	800 m

David Lekuta Rudisha, MBS (born 17 December 1988) is a retired Kenyan middle-distance runner who is the world and Olympic record holder in the 800 metres. Rudisha won gold medals in the 800 m at the 2012 London and 2016 Rio Olympic Games; at the former, he set the current world record with a time of 1:40.91. He is also a two-time World champion (2011 and 2015) and two-time Diamond League champion (2010 and 2011) in the 800 m. Rudisha is the first and only person to ever run 800 m under 1:41, and holds the three fastest times ever in the event, each being a world record at the time.

Rudisha established his running career at the St. Francis Kimuron High School in Elgeyo-Marakwet County. He won 800 m titles at the 2006 World Junior Championships as well as the 2008 and 2010 African Championships, and earned the 2014 Commonwealth Games silver medal. He also holds the world's best time in the 500 metres and the African best for the 600 metres. He is a two-time Diamond League 800 m winner. Rudisha won the IAAF World Athlete of the Year award in 2010 and three consecutive Track & Field News Athlete of the Year awards.

In May 2022, Rudisha announced he would be running for election in his native Kenya as an independent candidate in the Kilgoris Constituency. In March 2024, Rudisha served as the World Athletics ambassador for the 2024 World Athletics Indoor Championships in Glasgow, Scotland.

== Early life and background ==
Born on 17 December 1988 in Kilgoris, Narok County, Rudisha went to Kimuron Secondary School in Iten, Keiyo District. In April 2005, whilst under Brother Colm's tutelage, Japheth Kimutai, who was trained by Colm, recommended Rudisha to James Templeton, and Rudisha joined the group of runners managed by Templeton, which has at various time included Kimutai, Bernard Lagat and Augustine Choge. Initially he was the 400 metres runner, but his coach, Irishman Colm O'Connell, prompted him to try the 800 metres. In 2006, he became the world junior champion over that distance.

== Career ==
=== Early career ===
Rudisha competed at the 2009 World Athletics Championships, reaching the 800 metres semi-finals. In September 2009, he won the IAAF Grand Prix meeting in Rieti, Italy, posting a new African record of 1:42.01, beating the 25-year-old record of 1:42.28 set by compatriot Sammy Koskei. That effort put him in fourth place on the all-time list.

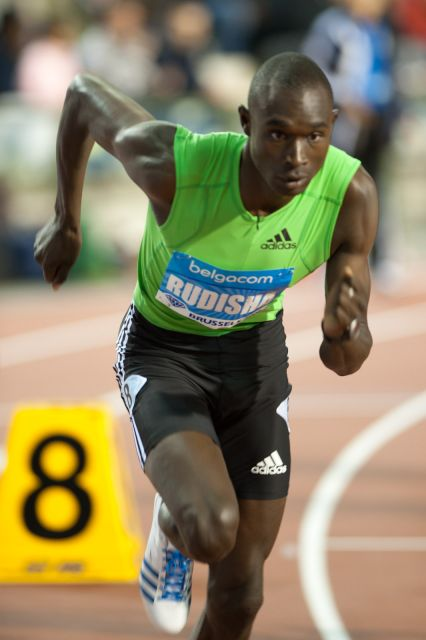
Rudisha at the 2010 Memorial van Damme in Brussels.

In the 2010 Diamond League, he took on Abubaker Kaki at the Bislett Games in June. He defeated Sebastian Coe's 31-year-old meet record with a run of 1:42.04, giving him another place in the top-ten fastest ever 800 m and leaving Kaki the consolation of the fastest ever non-winning time. On 10 July, Rudisha ran the 800 m in 1:41.51 at the KBC Night of Athletics in Heusden, Belgium; this new personal record placed him No. 2 all-time in the world for the 800 m.

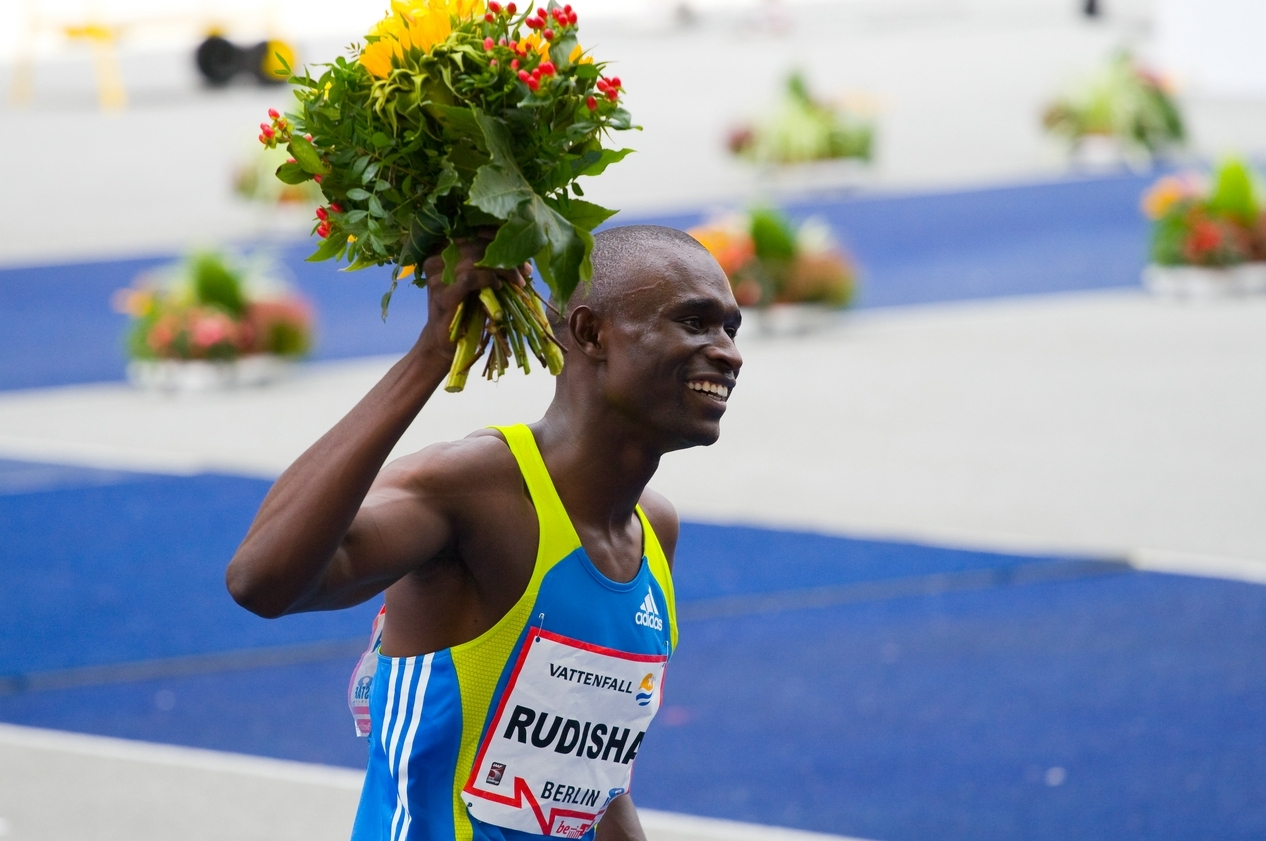
Rudisha at the 2010 ISTAF Berlin where he set his first world record.

On 22 August, Rudisha broke Wilson Kipketer's 800 m world record two days before the anniversary of that record with a time of 1:41.09 while racing in the ISTAF Berlin meeting in Germany. Just a week later, he broke the record again at the IAAF World Challenge meeting in Rieti, lowering it to 1:41.01. Rudisha recorded four victories on the Diamond League circuit that year to take his first 800 m Diamond Trophy. In November, at the age of 21, he became the youngest ever athlete to win the IAAF World Athlete of the Year award. He was also crowned Kenyan Sportsman of the Year.

Rudisha claimed his first senior global title at the 2011 World Championships in Athletics held in Daegu, South Korea, winning the 800 m event with a time of 1:43.91. He also triumphed in three Diamond League races that season to secure his second consecutive overall 800 m Diamond Race title.

=== 2012: Olympic gold and new world record ===
With a time of 1:41.74, Rudisha set the United States all comers 800 m record at the 2012 adidas Grand Prix at Icahn Stadium in New York City. He guaranteed his selection for the Kenyan Olympic team for the first time with a win at the Kenyan trials, running a time of 1:42.12 minutes—the fastest ever recorded at altitude. In his final race before the Olympics, he held off Asbel Kiprop for the win at the Paris Diamond League, in a new world lead of 1:41.54.

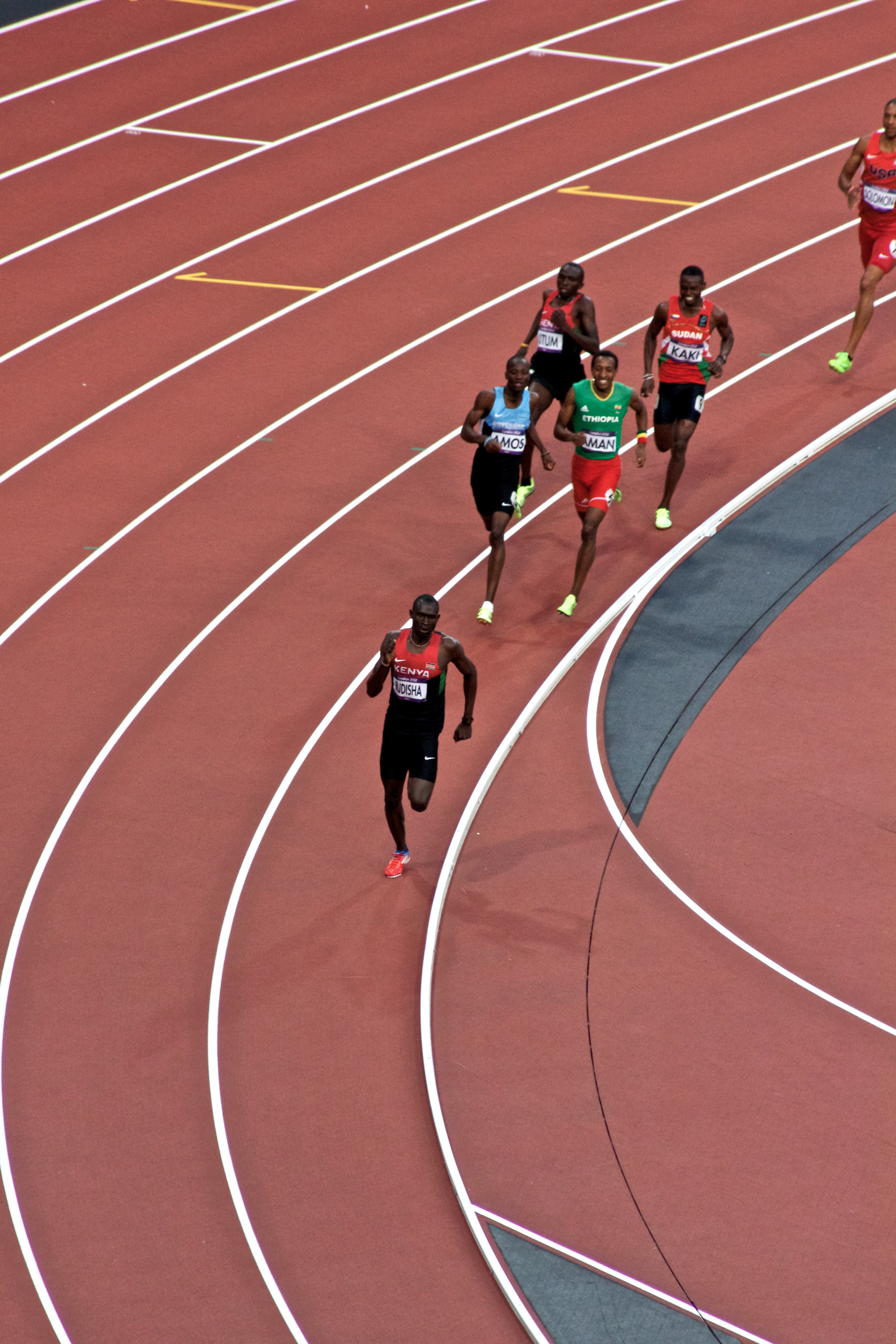
Rudisha en route to his world record at 2012 London Olympics.

On 9 August 2012 at the 2012 Summer Olympics in London, Rudisha led from start to finish to win gold in what was acclaimed "The Greatest 800 Meter Race Ever". In so doing, he became the first and, so far, only runner to break the 1:41 barrier for 800 m. From the start of the final race, Rudisha led and pulled away from the rest of the field after 200 metres, completing the first lap in 49.28 seconds. By 600 metres his lead had grown to several metres. He continued to pull away until the final straight, where second place Nijel Amos was able to slightly gain some ground as Rudisha strained. But the gap was much too great to close, and Rudisha crossed the line in a world-record time of 1:40.91.

Rudisha's competitors all ran exceptional times. Sports Illustrated's David Epstein reported that the race "is best told, perhaps, in 16 letters: WR, NR, PB, PB, PB, NR, SB, PB." (That is to say that the participants broke world record, national record, personal bests, national record, season best, personal best) The silver medallist, Amos, had to be carried from the track on a stretcher after setting the world junior record, making him only the fifth man in history to run under 1:42, something Rudisha has now done seven times. "With Rudisha breaking 1:41, two men under 1:42, five under 1:43 and all eight under 1:44," noted the IAAF, "it was the greatest depth 800 m race in history." Every competitor ran the fastest time in history for their placing. It was the first time in international 800 m history where every competitor ran either a personal or season's best. The time set by the eighth-placed Andrew Osagie, a personal best of 1:43.77, would have won gold at the three preceding Olympic games in Beijing, Athens and Sydney.

As well as being the first man to go below 1:41, he broke his own world record that was set in 2010. "The splits triggered amazement: 23.4 secs for the first 200 m, 25.88 secs for the second, a critical 25.02 for the third and 26.61 to bring it all home." Rudisha's record was considered especially notable for the absence of pacemakers, which are not permitted at the Olympics or other major championships. The previous person to win an Olympic 800 m final with a world record was Alberto Juantorena, back in 1976. Rudisha also became the first reigning 800 m world champion to win Olympic gold at that distance. Sebastian Coe, of the London Olympics organising committee who himself held the 800 m world record for 17 years, said: "It was the performance of the Games, not just of track and field but of the Games". He added: "Bolt was good, Rudisha was magnificent. That is quite a big call but it was the most extraordinary piece of running I have probably ever seen."

Before the race, Rudisha had joked about his father's 1968 400 m relay silver medal: "It would be good for me to win gold, so we can have gold and silver in our family [...] so I can tell him, 'I am better than you.'" Afterwards, he admitted that it would go down as the greatest 800 m race personally for him as well because he won it in front of Sebastian Coe who held the record for more than 17 years. This race was also touted as a run for his community and tribe. Rudisha was later given the Association of National Olympic Committees Award for Best Male Athlete of London 2012, as well as receiving the honour of Moran of the Order of the Burning Spear (MBS) from the government of Kenya.

=== 2013-2015: Injuries and second world title ===
Rudisha could not compete for much of the 2013 season, including at the 2013 World Championships, because of an injury.

In 2014, Rudisha won silver at the 2014 Commonwealth Games, finishing behind Nijel Amos, in a time of 1:45.48. He followed it up at the Birmingham Diamond League on 5 June by attempting to beat Johnny Gray's 600 m world best of 1:12.81. Whilst he missed the record, Rudisha set a new personal best of 1:13.71. He finished third in his last race of the season at the Weltklasse in Zurich, being beaten again by Nijel Amos and settling for third in 1:43.96.

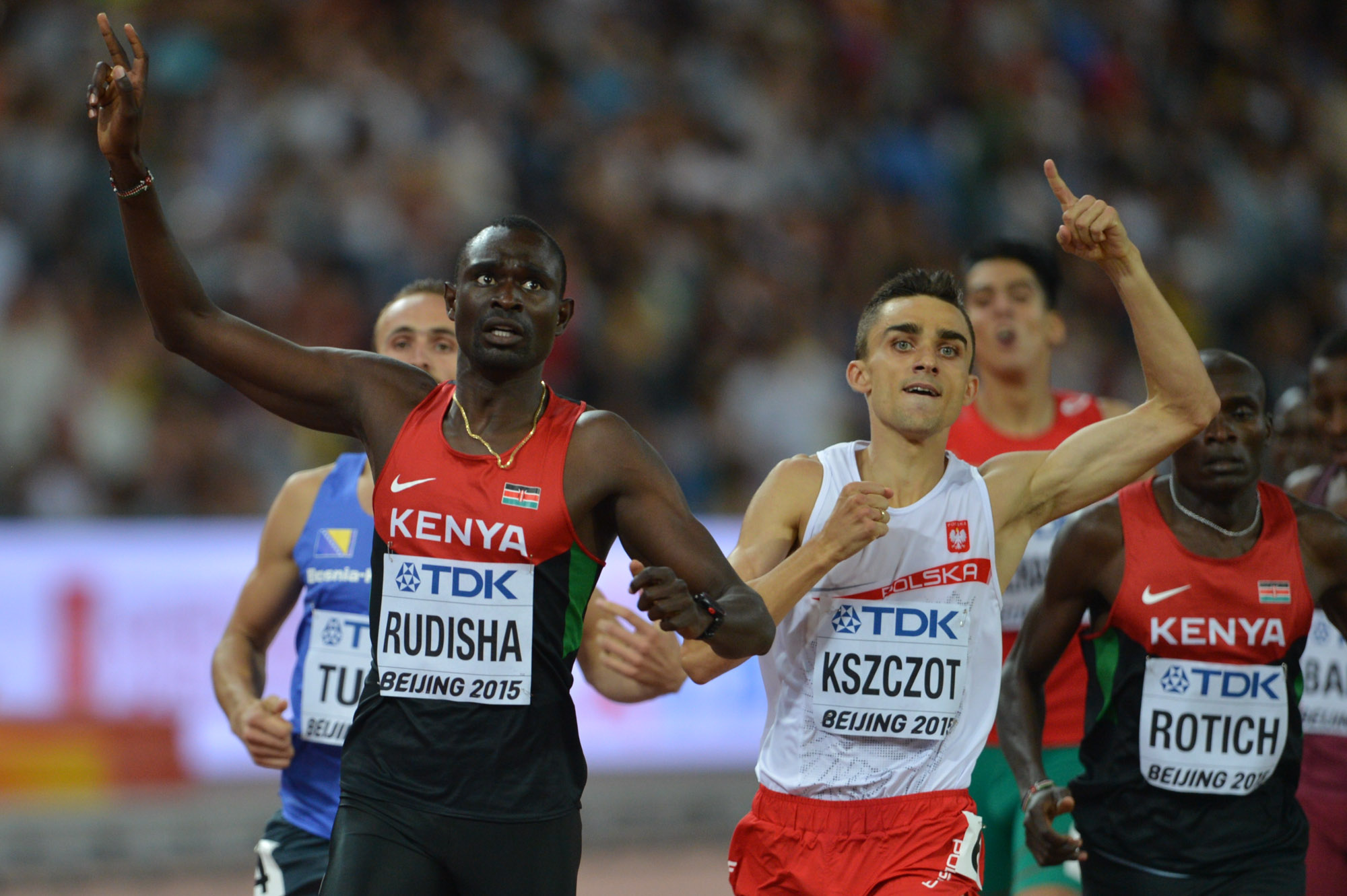
Rudisha after winning gold at the 2015 World Championships.

Despite pulling up injured whilst competing over 600 m at the Golden Spike in Ostrava on 26 May 2015, Rudisha recovered to win at the New York City Grand Prix on 13 June, Rudisha won the 800 m with a time of 1:43.58. Rudisha claimed his second world 800 m title at the World Championships held in Beijing, China. In a relatively tactical race, after a first lap of only 54.17 he pulled away from the field to win in a time of 1:45.84.

On 5 June 2016, Rudisha once again attempted to break the 600 m world best at the Birmingham Diamond League. He missed the world best but set a new African best of 1:13.10 and the second-fastest time ever. Rudisha secured his qualification for the 2016 Summer Olympics after finishing third at the Kenyan Olympic Trials in a time of 1:44.23. At the Olympics, successfully defended his Olympic title, taking gold with a time of 1:42.15. He was the first person since Peter Snell in 1964 to win back-to-back Olympic 800 m titles. The final went out very quickly with fellow Kenyan Alfred Kipketer leading through 200 m in 23.2 sec. Rudisha was tucked in close behind through a 49.3 first 400 m. With just under 300 m to go Rudisha made a strong surge to the front. A large gap was formed that proved too much for fast closing Taoufik Makhloufi of Algeria in the final homestretch. His finishing time was the fastest he had run since the 2012 Olympic final in London, as well as the fastest time in the world for 2016.

=== Later career: accidents and retirement ===
In 2017, Rudisha finished fourth at the Shanghai Diamond League meet on 13 May in a time of 1:45.36. Kipyegon Bett won in 1:44.70. He attempted the 1000 metres for the first time at the Golden Spike Ostrava, finishing fourth with a personal best time of 2:19.43. In his final race of his career, he won over 800 m at the Gyulai István Memorial in Székesfehérvár on 4 July with a time of 1:44.90.

In 2019, Rudisha's car collided head-on with a bus near Keroka. The collision was frontal, but he was not seriously injured.

Rudisha's plan to defend his title at Tokyo 2020 was frustrated by injuries, preventing him from becoming the first man to win three consecutive Olympic titles. In December 2022, he was one of five people who survived a plane crash-landing in Kenya.

== Coaching ==
At the 2012 Olympics, Rudisha worked with Caroline Currid, an Irish mental performance coach, on how to maximise performance on competition day.

From 2007 until at least 2012, Rudisha trained in the summer months in the university town of Tübingen in southern Germany, a center for many up-and-coming runners from Kenya such as Bernard Lagat.

== Personal life ==
Rudisha is a member of the Maasai ethnic group in Kenya. His father, Daniel Rudisha, was a former runner who won the silver medal at the 1968 Olympics as part of the Kenyan 4 × 400 m relay team, while his mother Naomi is a former 400 m hurdler. He is married to Lizzy Naanyu and has two daughters (as of 2015). Tom Fordyce of the BBC said of him, "He is the greatest 800m runner of all time and he may also be the nicest man in his sport."

He is a supporter of the football club Arsenal F.C.

== Achievements ==
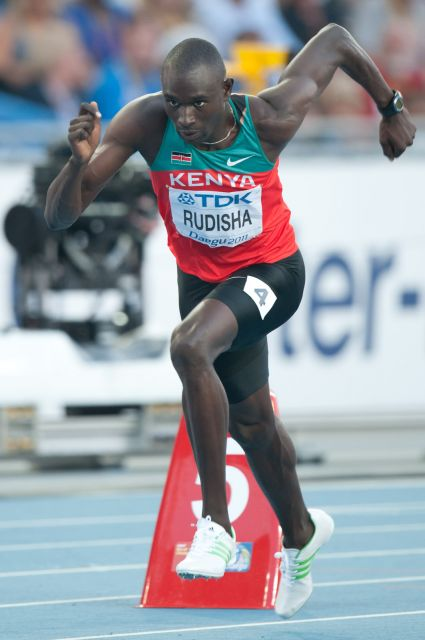
Rudisha at the 2011 World Championships in Daegu

=== International competitions ===
Representing Kenya
Year	Competition	Venue	Position	Event	Notes
2006	World Junior Championships	Beijing, China	1st	800 m	1:47.40
2006	World Junior Championships	Beijing, China	4th	4 × 400 m relay	3:05.54
2007	African Junior Championships	Ouagadougou, Burkina Faso	1st	800 m	1:46.41
2008	African Championships	Addis Ababa, Ethiopia	1st	800 m	1:44.20
2009	World Athletics Final	Thessaloniki, Greece	1st	800 m	1:44.85
2010	African Championships	Nairobi, Kenya	1st	800 m	1:42.84
2011	World Championships	Daegu, South Korea	1st	800 m	1:43.91
2012	Olympic Games	London, United Kingdom	1st	800 m	1:40.91 WR
2014	Commonwealth Games	Glasgow, Scotland	2nd	800 m	1:45.48
2015	World Championships	Beijing, China	1st	800 m	1:45.84
2016	Olympic Games	Rio de Janeiro, Brazil	1st	800 m	1:42.15

=== Circuit wins and titles ===
- Diamond League 800 m overall winner: 2010, 2011

800 metres wins, other events specified in parentheses

- 2010 (4): Doha Qatar Athletic Super Grand Prix (WL MR), Oslo Bislett Games (WL MR), Lausanne Athletissima, Brussels Memorial Van Damme
- 2011 (4): Lausanne, Monaco Herculis (WL), London Grand Prix (promotional events), Brussels
- 2012 (3): Doha, New York Adidas Grand Prix (WL MR), Paris Meeting Areva
- 2013 (2): Doha Qatar Athletic (WL), New York
- 2014 (3): New York, Glasgow Grand Prix (=WL), Birmingham British Athletics Grand Prix (600m)
- 2015 (1): New York (SB)
- 2016 (1): Birmingham (600m, WL MR AB)

Records
Preceded by Wilson Kipketer	Men's 800 metres world record holder 29 August 2010–present	Succeeded by Incumbent
Awards
Preceded by Usain Bolt	IAAF World Athlete of the Year; 2010	Succeeded by Usain Bolt
Preceded by Usain Bolt	Men's Track & Field Athlete of the Year; 2010–2012	Succeeded by Bohdan Bondarenko
Sporting positions
Preceded by Abubaker Kaki; Amel Tuka	Men's 800 metres best year performance 2009–2012; 2016	Succeeded by Mohammed Aman; Emmanuel Korir
