= Nabil Madi =

Algerian middle-distance runner

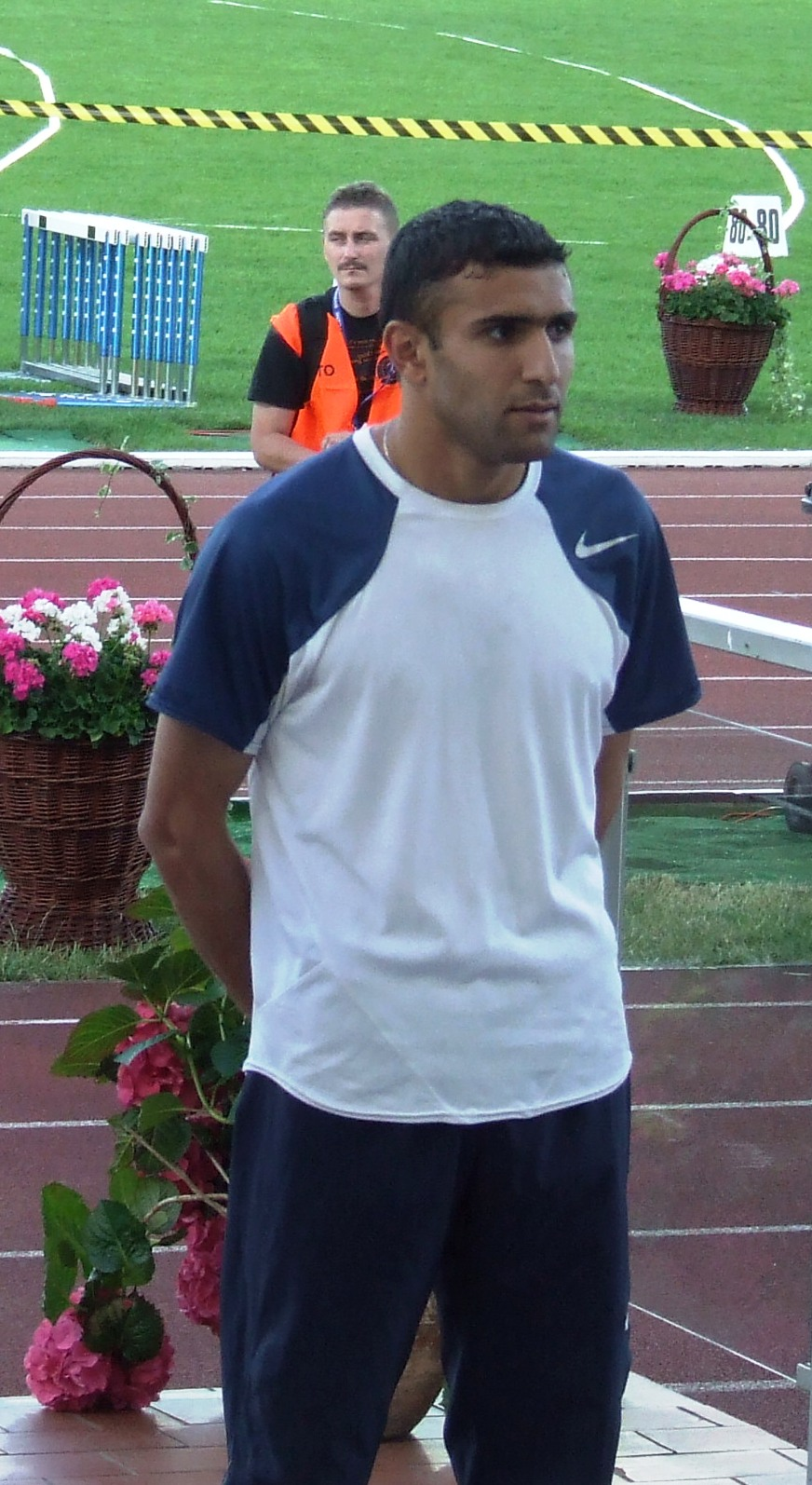

Personal information
- Born: June 9, 1981 (age 45)

Sport
- Country: Algeria
- Sport: 800 metres run

Nabil Madi (born 9 June 1981) is an Algerian middle-distance runner who specializes in the 800 metres.

He finished fourth at the 2006 African Championships. He also competed at the 2004 Olympic Games and the 2007 World Championships without reaching the final.

His personal best time is 1:44.54 minutes, achieved in July 2007 in Heusden-Zolder. In the 1500 metres he has 3:34.74 minutes, achieved in June 2008 in Rabat.

Nabil Madi is now athletics coach in Algeria working with middle-distance runner Slimane Moula.
