= Athletics at the 2006 Commonwealth Games – Men's 400 metres =

Men's 400 metres at the Commonwealth Games

The 400 metres at the 2006 Commonwealth Games as part of the athletics programme were held at the Melbourne Cricket Ground from Monday 20 March to Wednesday 22 March 2006.

The top two runners in each of the eight heats automatically qualified for the semifinals. The next eight fastest runners from across the heats also qualified. Those 24 runners competed in 3 semifinals, with the top two runners from each and next two fastest qualifying for the final.

== Records ==
| World Record | 43.18 s | Michael Johnson | USA | Seville, Spain | 26 August 1999 |
| Games Record | 44.52 s | Iwan Thomas | WAL | Kuala Lumpur, Malaysia | 18 September 1998 |

== Medals ==
| Gold: | Silver: | Bronze: |
| John Steffensen, Australia | Alleyne Francique, Grenada | Jermaine Gonzales, Jamaica |

== Qualification ==
Going into the event, the top ten Commonwealth athletes as ranked by the International Association of Athletics Federations were:

| 13 March Rank | | Athlete | Nation | Games Result | 27 March Rank | |
| Comm. | World | Athlete | Nation | Games Result | Comm. | World |
|---|---|---|---|---|---|---|
| 1 | 2 | Chris Brown | Bahamas | 4th | 1 | 2 |
| =2 | =3 | Timothy Benjamin | Wales | Did not compete | =2 | =3 |
| =2 | =3 | Brandon Simpson | Jamaica | Did not compete | =2 | =3 |
| 4 | 5 | Tyler Christopher | Canada | Did not compete | 4 | 5 |
| 5 | =7 | Alleyne Francique | Grenada | Silver | 5 | 6 |
| 6 | =9 | Michael Blackwood | Jamaica | Did not compete | 6 | =9 |
| 7 | 12 | Davian Clarke | Jamaica | Semifinalist | 7 | 12 |
| 8 | 16 | Sanjay Ayre | Jamaica | Did not compete | 9 | 17 |
| 9 | 17 | John Steffensen | Australia | Gold | 8 | 13 |
| 10 | 18 | Robert Tobin | England | Semifinalist | 11 | 19 |

== Results ==
All times shown are in seconds.

- Q denotes qualification by place in heat.
- q denotes qualification by overall place.
- DNS denotes did not start.
- DNF denotes did not finish.
- DQ denotes disqualification.
- NR denotes national record.
- GR denotes Games record.
- WR denotes world record.
- PB denotes personal best.
- SB denotes season best.

=== Heats ===
Heat 1 of 8 Date: Monday 20 March 2006 Time: ??:?? AM Wind: ?.? m/s
| Place | | Athlete | Nation | Lane | Reaction | Time | Qual. | Record |
| Heat | Overall | Athlete | Nation | Lane | Reaction | Time | Qual. | Record |
|---|---|---|---|---|---|---|---|---|
| 1 | 7 | James Godday | Nigeria | 3 | 0.224 s | 45.93 s | Q | |
| 2 | =9 | Chris Lloyd | Dominica | 4 | 0.166 s | 46.14 s | Q | SB |
| 3 | 19 | Gakologelwang Masheto | Botswana | 6 | 0.174 s | 46.43 s | q | PB |
| 4 | 24 | Jan van der Merwe | South Africa | 5 | 0.292 s | 46.81 s | q | |
| 5 | =36 | Chris Walasi | Solomon Islands | 2 | 0.193 s | 48.20 s | | |
| - | - | Moses Kamut | Vanuatu | 1 | | DNS | | |

Heat 2 of 8 Date: Monday 20 March 2006 Time: ??:?? AM Wind: ?.? m/s
| Place | | Athlete | Nation | Lane | Reaction | Time | Qual. | Record |
| Heat | Overall | Athlete | Nation | Lane | Reaction | Time | Qual. | Record |
|---|---|---|---|---|---|---|---|---|
| 1 | 14 | Robert Tobin | England | 4 | 0.230 s | 46.20 s | Q | |
| 2 | 21 | Davian Clarke | Jamaica | 7 | 0.246 s | 46.53 s | Q | |
| 3 | 22 | Damion Barry | Trinidad and Tobago | 3 | 0.244 s | 46.66 s | q | |
| 4 | 30 | Julius Kirwa | Kenya | 5 | 0.213 s | 47.55 s | | |
| 5 | 31 | Enote Inanga | Saint Kitts and Nevis | 6 | 0.216 s | 47.59 s | | |
| 6 | =36 | Samuel Egadu | Uganda | 2 | 0.217 s | 48.20 s | | |

Heat 3 of 8 Date: Monday 20 March 2006 Time: ??:?? AM Wind: ?.? m/s
| Place | | Athlete | Nation | Lane | Reaction | Time | Qual. | Record |
| Heat | Overall | Athlete | Nation | Lane | Reaction | Time | Qual. | Record |
|---|---|---|---|---|---|---|---|---|
| 1 | 18 | Ato Modibo | Trinidad and Tobago | 3 | ?? | 46.42 s | Q | |
| 2 | 23 | Eric Milazar | Mauritius | 5 | ?? | 46.68 s | Q | |
| 3 | 26 | Rohan Pradeep Kumara | Sri Lanka | 7 | ?? | 47.03 s | | |
| 4 | 28 | Gareth Warburton | Wales | 6 | ?? | 47.31 s | | |
| 5 | 34 | Waisea Finau | Fiji | 2 | ?? | 48.10 s | | PB |

Heat 4 of 8 Date: Monday 20 March 2006 Time: ??:?? AM Wind: ?.? m/s
| Place | | Athlete | Nation | Lane | Reaction | Time | Qual. | Record |
| Heat | Overall | Athlete | Nation | Lane | Reaction | Time | Qual. | Record |
|---|---|---|---|---|---|---|---|---|
| 1 | 11 | Chris Brown | (The Bahamas) Bahamas | 4 | 0.187 s | 46.16 s | Q | |
| 2 | 13 | Clinton Hill | Australia | 6 | 0.206 s | 46.18 s | Q | |
| 3 | 25 | Prasanna Amarasekara | Sri Lanka | 3 | 0.227 s | 46.83 s | | |
| 4 | 35 | Fernando Augustin | Mauritius | 5 | 0.212 s | 48.11 s | | |
| 5 | 43 | Tawhidul Islam Md | Bangladesh | 7 | 0.239 s | 51.70 s | | |
| 6 | 44 | Shaquan Been | Turks and Caicos Islands | 2 | 0.250 s | 51.79 s | | |

Heat 5 of 8 Date: Monday 20 March 2006 Time: ??:?? AM Wind: ?.? m/s
| Place | | Athlete | Nation | Lane | Reaction | Time | Qual. | Record |
| Heat | Overall | Athlete | Nation | Lane | Reaction | Time | Qual. | Record |
|---|---|---|---|---|---|---|---|---|
| 1 | 6 | John Steffensen | Australia | 2 | 0.200 s | 45.87 s | Q | |
| 2 | 15 | Saul Welgopwa | Nigeria | 7 | 0.360 s | 46.26 s | Q | |
| 3 | 20 | Ofentse Mogawane | South Africa | 6 | 0.178 s | 46.44 s | q | |
| 4 | 32 | Obakeng Ngwigwa | Botswana | 5 | 0.229 s | 47.67 s | | |
| 5 | 41 | Nkosie Barnes | Antigua and Barbuda | 4 | 0.327 s | 49.69 s | | |
| - | - | Daryl Vassallo | Gibraltar | 3 | | DNS | | |

Heat 6 of 8 Date: Monday 20 March 2006 Time: ??:?? AM Wind: ?.? m/s
| Place | | Athlete | Nation | Lane | Reaction | Time | Qual. | Record |
| Heat | Overall | Athlete | Nation | Lane | Reaction | Time | Qual. | Record |
|---|---|---|---|---|---|---|---|---|
| 1 | 1 | California Molefe | Botswana | 6 | 0.228 s | 45.36 s | Q | |
| 2 | 2 | Alleyne Francique | Grenada | 3 | 0.183 s | 45.60 s | Q | SB |
| 3 | 4 | Avard Moncur | (The Bahamas) Bahamas | 4 | 0.194 s | 45.82 s | q | SB |
| 4 | 12 | Sean Wroe | Australia | 7 | 0.264 s | 46.17 s | q | |
| 5 | 39 | Foy Waqairadovu | Fiji | 2 | 0.224 s | 48.98 s | | PB |
| 6 | 46 | Ismail Saneem | Maldives | 5 | 0.226 s | 53.42 s | | SB |
| - | - | Bola Lawal | Nigeria | 8 | 0.242 s | DSQ | | 163.3 |

Heat 7 of 8 Date: Monday 20 March 2006 Time: ??:?? AM Wind: ?.? m/s
| Place | | Athlete | Nation | Lane | Reaction | Time | Qual. | Record |
| Heat | Overall | Athlete | Nation | Lane | Reaction | Time | Qual. | Record |
|---|---|---|---|---|---|---|---|---|
| 1 | 8 | Lansford Spence | Jamaica | 2 | 0.278 s | 46.13 s | Q | |
| 2 | =9 | Paul Gorries | South Africa | 5 | 0.279 s | 46.14 s | Q | |
| 3 | 16 | Wambua Musembi | Kenya | 3 | 0.364 s | 46.31 s | q | |
| 4 | 17 | Niko Verekauta | Fiji | 4 | 0.236 s | 46.40 s | q | PB |
| 5 | 29 | Roger Polydore | Dominica | 6 | 0.323 s | 47.40 s | | PB |
| 6 | 45 | Arnold Sorina | Vanuatu | 1 | 0.190 s | 52.41 s | | |
| - | - | Albert Kobba | Sierra Leone | 7 | 0.183 s | DSQ | | 163.3 |

Heat 8 of 8 Date: Monday 20 March 2006 Time: ??:?? AM Wind: ?.? m/s
| Place | | Athlete | Nation | Lane | Reaction | Time | Qual. | Record |
| Heat | Overall | Athlete | Nation | Lane | Reaction | Time | Qual. | Record |
|---|---|---|---|---|---|---|---|---|
| 1 | 3 | Martyn Rooney | England | 7 | 0.255 s | 45.69 s | Q | PB |
| 2 | 5 | Jermaine Gonzales | Jamaica | 6 | 0.223 s | 45.86 s | Q | SB |
| 3 | 27 | Ezra Sambu | Kenya | 3 | 0.269 s | 47.10 s | | |
| 4 | 33 | Hassan Fullah | Sierra Leone | 4 | 0.186 s | 47.91 s | | |
| 5 | 38 | Jean Degrace | Mauritius | 5 | 0.223 s | 48.41 s | | |
| 6 | 40 | Lukungu Waiswa | Uganda | 1 | 0.319 s | 49.10 s | | PB |
| 7 | 42 | Charmant Ollivierre | Saint Vincent and the Grenadines | 2 | 0.235 s | 50.31 s | | |
| - | - | Dennis Darling | (The Bahamas) Bahamas | 8 | 0.154 s | DNF | | |

Heats overall results
| Place | Athlete | Nation | Heat | Lane | Place | Wind | Time | Qual. | Record |
|---|---|---|---|---|---|---|---|---|---|
| 1 | California Molefe | Botswana | 6 | 6 | 1 | ?.? | 45.36 s | Q | |
| 2 | Alleyne Francique | Grenada | 6 | 3 | 2 | ?.? | 45.60 s | Q | SB |
| 3 | Martyn Rooney | England | 8 | 7 | 1 | ?.? | 45.69 s | Q | PB |
| 4 | Avard Moncur | (The Bahamas) Bahamas | 6 | 4 | 3 | ?.? | 45.82 s | q | SB |
| 5 | Jermaine Gonzales | Jamaica | 8 | 6 | 2 | ?.? | 45.86 s | Q | SB |
| 6 | John Steffensen | Australia | 5 | 2 | 1 | ?.? | 45.87 s | Q | |
| 7 | James Godday | Nigeria | 1 | 3 | 1 | ?.? | 45.93 s | Q | |
| 8 | Lansford Spence | Jamaica | 7 | 2 | 1 | ?.? | 46.13 s | Q | |
| 9 | Paul Gorries | South Africa | 7 | 5 | 2 | ?.? | 46.14 s | Q | |
| 9 | Chris Lloyd | Dominica | 1 | 4 | 2 | ?.? | 46.14 s | Q | SB |
| 11 | Chris Brown | (The Bahamas) Bahamas | 4 | 4 | 1 | ?.? | 46.16 s | Q | |
| 12 | Sean Wroe | Australia | 6 | 7 | 4 | ?.? | 46.17 s | q | |
| 13 | Clinton Hill | Australia | 4 | 6 | 2 | ?.? | 46.18 s | Q | |
| 14 | Robert Tobin | England | 2 | 4 | 1 | ?.? | 46.20 s | Q | |
| 15 | Saul Welgopwa | Nigeria | 5 | 7 | 2 | ?.? | 46.26 s | Q | |
| 16 | Wambua Musembi | Kenya | 7 | 3 | 3 | ?.? | 46.31 s | q | |
| 17 | Niko Verekauta | Fiji | 7 | 4 | 4 | ?.? | 46.40 s | q | PB |
| 18 | Ato Modibo | Trinidad and Tobago | 3 | 3 | 1 | ?.? | 46.42 s | Q | |
| 19 | Gakologelwang Masheto | Botswana | 1 | 6 | 3 | ?.? | 46.43 s | q | PB |
| 20 | Ofentse Mogawane | South Africa | 5 | 6 | 3 | ?.? | 46.44 s | q | |
| 21 | Davian Clarke | Jamaica | 2 | 7 | 2 | ?.? | 46.53 s | Q | |
| 22 | Damion Barry | Trinidad and Tobago | 2 | 3 | 3 | ?.? | 46.66 s | q | |
| 23 | Eric Milazar | Mauritius | 3 | 5 | 2 | ?.? | 46.68 s | Q | |
| 24 | Jan van der Merwe | South Africa | 1 | 5 | 4 | ?.? | 46.81 s | q | |
| 25 | Prasanna Amarasekara | Sri Lanka | 4 | 3 | 3 | ?.? | 46.83 s | | |
| 26 | Rohan Pradeep Kumara | Sri Lanka | 3 | 7 | 3 | ?.? | 47.03 s | | |
| 27 | Ezra Sambu | Kenya | 8 | 3 | 3 | ?.? | 47.10 s | | |
| 28 | Gareth Warburton | Wales | 3 | 6 | 4 | ?.? | 47.31 s | | |
| 29 | Roger Polydore | Dominica | 7 | 6 | 5 | ?.? | 47.40 s | | PB |
| 30 | Julius Kirwa | Kenya | 2 | 5 | 4 | ?.? | 47.55 s | | |
| 31 | Enote Inanga | Saint Kitts and Nevis | 2 | 6 | 5 | ?.? | 47.59 s | | |
| 32 | Obakeng Ngwigwa | Botswana | 5 | 5 | 4 | ?.? | 47.67 s | | |
| 33 | Hassan Fullah | Sierra Leone | 8 | 4 | 4 | ?.? | 47.91 s | | |
| 34 | Waisea Finau | Fiji | 3 | 2 | 5 | ?.? | 48.10 s | | PB |
| 35 | Fernando Augustin | Mauritius | 4 | 5 | 4 | ?.? | 48.11 s | | |
| 36 | Samuel Egadu | Uganda | 2 | 2 | 6 | ?.? | 48.20 s | | |
| 36 | Chris Walasi | Solomon Islands | 2 | 2 | 6 | ?.? | 48.20 s | | |
| 38 | Jean Degrace | Mauritius | 8 | 5 | 5 | ?.? | 48.41 s | | |
| 39 | Foy Waqairadovu | Fiji | 6 | 2 | 5 | ?.? | 48.98 s | | PB |
| 40 | Lukungu Waiswa | Uganda | 8 | 1 | 6 | ?.? | 49.10 s | | PB |
| 41 | Nkosie Barnes | Antigua and Barbuda | 5 | 4 | 5 | ?.? | 49.69 s | | |
| 42 | Charmant Ollivierre | Saint Vincent and the Grenadines | 8 | 2 | 7 | ?.? | 50.31 s | | |
| 43 | Tawhidul Islam Md | Bangladesh | 4 | 7 | 5 | ?.? | 51.70 s | | |
| 44 | Shaquan Been | Turks and Caicos Islands | 4 | 2 | 6 | ?.? | 51.79 s | | |
| 45 | Arnold Sorina | Vanuatu | 7 | 1 | 6 | ?.? | 52.41 s | | |
| 46 | Ismail Saneem | Maldives | 6 | 5 | 6 | ?.? | 53.42 s | | SB |
| - | Dennis Darling | (The Bahamas) Bahamas | 8 | 8 | - | ?.? | DNF | | |
| - | Bola Lawal | Nigeria | 6 | 8 | - | ?.? | DSQ | | 163.3 |
| - | Albert Kobba | Sierra Leone | 7 | 7 | - | ?.? | DSQ | | 163.3 |
| - | Moses Kamut | Vanuatu | 1 | 1 | - | ?.? | DNS | | |
| - | Daryl Vassallo | Gibraltar | 5 | 3 | - | ?.? | DNS | | |

=== Semi-finals ===
Semifinal 1 of 3 Date: Tuesday 21 March 2006 Time: ??:?? PM Wind: ?.? m/s
| Place | | Athlete | Nation | Lane | Reaction | Time | Qual. | Record |
| Heat | Overall | Athlete | Nation | Lane | Reaction | Time | Qual. | Record |
|---|---|---|---|---|---|---|---|---|
| 1 | 3 | Lansford Spence | Jamaica | 5 | 0.323 s | 45.32 s | Q | |
| 2 | 4 | Martyn Rooney | England | 3 | 0.221 s | 45.35 s | Q | PB |
| 3 | 8 | Paul Gorries | South Africa | 6 | 0.177 s | 45.41 s | q | SB |
| 4 | 9 | Ato Modibo | Trinidad and Tobago | 4 | 0.256 s | 45.44 s | | |
| 5 | 10 | Avard Moncur | (The Bahamas) Bahamas | 2 | 0.166 s | 45.72 s | | SB |
| 6 | 16 | Saul Welgopwa | Nigeria | 1 | 0.168 s | 46.12 s | | |
| 7 | 18 | Niko Verekauta | Fiji | 7 | 0.189 s | 46.28 s | | PB |
| 8 | 21 | Sean Wroe | Australia | 8 | 0.207 s | 46.47 s | | |

Semifinal 2 of 3 Date: Thursday 23 March 2006 Time: ??:?? PM Wind: ?.? m/s
| Place | | Athlete | Nation | Lane | Reaction | Time | Qual. | Record |
| Heat | Overall | Athlete | Nation | Lane | Reaction | Time | Qual. | Record |
|---|---|---|---|---|---|---|---|---|
| 1 | 1 | John Steffensen | Australia | 5 | 0.283 s | 45.05 s | Q | PB |
| 2 | =5 | Alleyne Francique | Grenada | 3 | 0.215 s | 45.36 s | Q | SB |
| 3 | 7 | Jermaine Gonzales | Jamaica | 6 | 0.350 s | 45.38 s | q | PB |
| 4 | 13 | James Godday | Nigeria | 4 | 0.308 s | 45.80 s | | |
| 5 | 19 | Wambua Musembi | Kenya | 7 | 0.370 s | 46.34 s | | |
| 6 | 20 | Ofentse Mogawane | South Africa | 8 | 0.350 s | 46.46 s | | |
| 7 | 22 | Eric Milazar | Mauritius | 1 | 0.254 s | 46.48 s | | |
| 8 | 24 | Gakologelwang Masheto | Botswana | 2 | 0.150 s | 46.97 s | | |

Semifinal 3 of 3 Date: Thursday 23 March 2006 Time: ??:?? PM Wind: ?.? m/s
| Place | | Athlete | Nation | Lane | Reaction | Time | Qual. | Record |
| Heat | Overall | Athlete | Nation | Lane | Reaction | Time | Qual. | Record |
|---|---|---|---|---|---|---|---|---|
| 1 | 2 | Chris Brown | (The Bahamas) Bahamas | 6 | 0.182 s | 45.24 s | Q | SB |
| 2 | =5 | California Molefe | Botswana | 3 | 0.289 s | 45.36 s | Q | FS 1 |
| 3 | 11 | Robert Tobin | England | 4 | 0.236 s | 45.74 s | | |
| 4 | 12 | Davian Clarke | Jamaica | 7 | 0.213 s | 45.74 s | | |
| 5 | 14 | Clinton Hill | Australia | 1 | 0.206 s | 45.86 s | | |
| 6 | 15 | Jan van der Merwe | South Africa | 2 | 0.250 s | 45.93 s | | |
| 7 | 17 | Chris Lloyd | Dominica | 5 | 0.162 s | 46.24 s | | |
| 8 | 23 | Damion Barry | Trinidad and Tobago | 8 | 0.418 s | 46.96 s | | |

Semifinals overall results
| Place | Athlete | Nation | Heat | Lane | Place | Wind | Time | Qual. | Record |
|---|---|---|---|---|---|---|---|---|---|
| 1 | John Steffensen | Australia | 2 | 5 | 1 | ?.? | 45.05 s | Q | PB |
| 2 | Chris Brown | the Bahamas | 3 | 6 | 1 | ?.? | 45.24 s | Q | SB |
| 3 | Lansford Spence | Jamaica | 1 | 5 | 1 | ?.? | 45.32 s | Q | |
| 4 | Martyn Rooney | England | 1 | 3 | 2 | ?.? | 45.35 s | Q | PB |
| 5 | Alleyne Francique | Grenada | 2 | 3 | 2 | ?.? | 45.36 s | Q | SB |
| 5 | California Molefe | Botswana | 3 | 3 | 2 | ?.? | 45.36 s | Q | FS 1 |
| 7 | Jermaine Gonzales | Jamaica | 2 | 6 | 3 | ?.? | 45.38 s | q | PB |
| 8 | Paul Gorries | South Africa | 1 | 6 | 3 | ?.? | 45.41 s | q | SB |
| 9 | Ato Modibo | Trinidad and Tobago | 1 | 4 | 4 | ?.? | 45.44 s | | |
| 10 | Avard Moncur | (The Bahamas) Bahamas | 1 | 2 | 5 | ?.? | 45.72 s | | SB |
| 11 | Robert Tobin | England | 3 | 4 | 3 | ?.? | 45.74 s | | |
| 12 | Davian Clarke | Jamaica | 3 | 7 | 4 | ?.? | 45.74 s | | |
| 13 | James Godday | Nigeria | 2 | 4 | 4 | ?.? | 45.80 s | | |
| 14 | Clinton Hill | Australia | 3 | 1 | 5 | ?.? | 45.86 s | | |
| 15 | Jan van der Merwe | South Africa | 3 | 2 | 6 | ?.? | 45.93 s | | |
| 16 | Saul Welgopwa | Nigeria | 1 | 1 | 6 | ?.? | 46.12 s | | |
| 17 | Chris Lloyd | Dominica | 3 | 5 | 7 | ?.? | 46.24 s | | |
| 18 | Niko Verekauta | Fiji | 1 | 7 | 7 | ?.? | 46.28 s | | PB |
| 19 | Wambua Musembi | Kenya | 2 | 7 | 5 | ?.? | 46.34 s | | |
| 20 | Ofentse Mogawane | South Africa | 2 | 8 | 6 | ?.? | 46.46 s | | |
| 21 | Sean Wroe | Australia | 1 | 8 | 8 | ?.? | 46.47 s | | |
| 22 | Eric Milazar | Mauritius | 2 | 1 | 7 | ?.? | 46.48 s | | |
| 23 | Damion Barry | Trinidad and Tobago | 3 | 8 | 8 | ?.? | 46.96 s | | |
| 24 | Gakologelwang Masheto | Botswana | 2 | 2 | 8 | ?.? | 46.97 s | | |

=== Final ===
Final Date: Wednesday 22 March 2006 Time: ??:?? PM Wind: ?.? m/s
| Place | Athlete | Nation | Lane | Reaction | Time | Record |
|---|---|---|---|---|---|---|
| 1 | John Steffensen | Australia | 4 | 0.201 s | 44.73 s | PB |
| 2 | Alleyne Francique | Grenada | 7 | 0.206 s | 45.09 s | SB |
| 3 | Jermaine Gonzales | Jamaica | 8 | 0.216 s | 45.16 s | PB |
| 4 | Chris Brown | (The Bahamas) Bahamas | 3 | 0.264 s | 45.19 s | SB |
| 5 | Martyn Rooney | England | 5 | 0.182 s | 45.51 s | |
| 6 | California Molefe | Botswana | 2 | 0.283 s | 45.78 s | |
| 7 | Paul Gorries | South Africa | 1 | 0.161 s | 45.79 s | |
| 7 | Lansford Spence | Jamaica | 6 | 0.322 s | 45.79 s | |
