= Athletics at the 2006 Commonwealth Games – Men's 800 metres =

Men's 800 metres at the Commonwealth Games

The 800 metres at the 2006 Commonwealth Games as part of the athletics programme were held at the Melbourne Cricket Ground on Wednesday 22 March 2006 and Thursday 23 March 2006.

The top two runners in each of the three heats automatically qualified for the final. The next two fastest runners from across the heats also qualified. Those 8 runners competed in the final.

== Records ==
| World Record | 1:41.11 | Wilson Kipketer | DEN | Cologne, Germany | 24 August 1997 |
| Games Record | 1:43.22 | Steve Cram | ENG | Edinburgh, Scotland | July, 1986 |

== Medals ==
| Gold: | Silver: | Bronze: |
| Alex Kipchirchir, Kenya | Achraf Tadili, Canada | John Litei, Kenya |

== Qualification ==
Going into the event, the top ten Commonwealth athletes as ranked by the International Association of Athletics Federations were:

| 13 March Rank | | Athlete | Nation | Games Result | 27 March Rank | |
| Comm. | World | Athlete | Nation | Games Result | Comm. | World |
|---|---|---|---|---|---|---|
| 1 | 2 | Mbulaeni Mulaudzi | South Africa | Did Not Compete | 1 | 2 |
| 2 | 3 | Wilfred Bungei | Kenya | Did Not Compete | 2 | 3 |
| 3 | 4 | William Yiampoy | Kenya | Did Not Compete | 3 | 4 |
| 4 | 6 | Gary Reed | Canada | 4th in heat, did not advance to final | 4 | 6 |
| 5 | 8 | Alfred Yego | Kenya | Did Not Compete | 5 | 8 |
| 6 | =17 | Joseph Mutua | Kenya | Did Not Compete | 6 | =17 |
| 7 | 27 | James Mcilroy | Northern Ireland | 4th in heat, did not advance to final | 9 | 29 |
| 8 | 30 | Samwel Mwera | Tanzania | DSQ | 11 | 33 |
| 9 | 31 | John Litei | Kenya | Bronze | 8 | 27 |
| 10 | 32 | Achraf Tadili | Canada | Silver | 10 | 31 |

Alex Kipchirchir's gold in this event took him from outside the top 100 to 24th in the world, and to seventh in the Commonwealth.

== Results ==
All times shown are in minutes.

- Q denotes qualification by place in heat.
- q denotes qualification by overall place.
- DNS denotes did not start.
- DNF denotes did not finish.
- DQ denotes disqualification.
- NR denotes national record.
- GR denotes Games record.
- WR denotes world record.
- PB denotes personal best.
- SB denotes season best.

=== Heats ===
Heat 1 of 3 Date: Wednesday 22 March 2006 Time: 20:42
| Place | | Athlete | Nation | Order | Time | Qual. | Record |
| Heat | Overall | Athlete | Nation | Order | Time | Qual. | Record |
|---|---|---|---|---|---|---|---|
| 1 | 1 | John Litei | Kenya | 4 | 1:46.55 | Q | |
| 2 | 3 | Achraf Tadili | Canada | 1 | 1:47.67 | Q | |
| 3 | =4 | Jason Stewart | New Zealand | 5 | 1:47.74 | q | |
| 4 | 8 | Ghamanda Ram | India | 3 | 1:48.03 | | |
| 5 | 14 | Nigel Leonce | Saint Lucia | 2 | 1:51.33 | | |
| - | - | Samwel Mwera | Tanzania | 6 | DSQ | | 163.3 |

Split
| Mark | Athlete | Nation | Time |
|---|---|---|---|
| 400 m | John Litei | Kenya | 53.04 s |

Heat 2 of 3 Date: Wednesday 22 March 2006 Time: 20:50
| Place | | Athlete | Nation | Order | Time | Qual. | Record |
| Heat | Overall | Athlete | Nation | Order | Time | Qual. | Record |
|---|---|---|---|---|---|---|---|
| 1 | 2 | Alex Kipchirchir | Kenya | 2 | 1:46.96 | Q | |
| 2 | =4 | Nick Bromley | Australia | 3 | 1:47.74 | Q | |
| 3 | 6 | Onalenna Oabona | Botswana | 4 | 1:47.78 | q | |
| 4 | 7 | Gary Reed | Canada | 5 | 1:47.96 | | |
| 5 | =10 | Jimmy Adar | Uganda | 6 | 1:49.33 | | |
| 6 | 15 | Setefano Mika | Samoa | 1 | 1:52.13 | | |
| - | - | Bakary Jabbi | The Gambia | 7 | DNS | | |

Split
| Mark | Athlete | Nation | Time |
|---|---|---|---|
| 400 m | Alex Kipchirchir | Kenya | 53.79 s |

Heat 3 of 3 Date: Wednesday 22 March 2006 Time: 21:00
| Place | | Athlete | Nation | Order | Time | Qual. | Record |
| Heat | Overall | Athlete | Nation | Order | Time | Qual. | Record |
|---|---|---|---|---|---|---|---|
| 1 | 9 | Sherridan Kirk | Trinidad and Tobago | 3 | 1:49.11 | Q | |
| 2 | =10 | Cosmas Rono | Kenya | 6 | 1:49.33 | Q | |
| 3 | 12 | David Gill | Canada | 2 | 1:49.80 | | |
| 4 | 13 | James Mcilroy | Northern Ireland | 1 | 1:49.85 | | |
| 5 | 16 | Lamin Keita | The Gambia | 4 | 1:54.35 | | |
| 6 | 17 | Michael Donawa | Bermuda | 5 | 1:54.65 | | |

Split
| Mark | Athlete | Nation | Time |
|---|---|---|---|
| 400 m | Sherridan Kirk | Trinidad and Tobago | 55.06 s |

Heats Overall Results
| Place | Athlete | Nation | Heat | Order | Place | Time | Qual. | Record |
|---|---|---|---|---|---|---|---|---|
| 1 | John Litei | Kenya | 1 | 4 | 1 | 1:46.55 | Q | |
| 2 | Alex Kipchirchir | Kenya | 2 | 2 | 1 | 1:46.96 | Q | |
| 3 | Achraf Tadili | Canada | 1 | 1 | 2 | 1:47.67 | Q | |
| 4 | Nick Bromley | Australia | 2 | 3 | 2 | 1:47.74 | Q | |
| 4 | Jason Stewart | New Zealand | 1 | 5 | 3 | 1:47.74 | q | |
| 6 | Onalenna Oabona | Botswana | 2 | 4 | 3 | 1:47.78 | q | |
| 7 | Gary Reed | Canada | 2 | 5 | 4 | 1:47.96 | | |
| 8 | Ghamanda Ram | India | 1 | 3 | 4 | 1:48.03 | | |
| 9 | Sherridan Kirk | Trinidad and Tobago | 3 | 3 | 1 | 1:49.11 | Q | |
| 10 | Jimmy Adar | Uganda | 2 | 6 | 5 | 1:49.33 | | |
| 10 | Cosmas Rono | Kenya | 3 | 6 | 2 | 1:49.33 | Q | |
| 12 | David Gill | Canada | 3 | 2 | 3 | 1:49.80 | | |
| 13 | James Mcilroy | Northern Ireland | 3 | 1 | 4 | 1:49.85 | | |
| 14 | Nigel Leonce | Saint Lucia | 1 | 2 | 5 | 1:51.33 | | |
| 15 | Setefano Mika | Samoa | 2 | 1 | 6 | 1:52.13 | | |
| 16 | Lamin Keita | The Gambia | 3 | 4 | 5 | 1:54.35 | | |
| 17 | Michael Donawa | Bermuda | 3 | 5 | 6 | 1:54.65 | | |
| - | Samwel Mwera | Tanzania | 1 | 6 | - | DSQ | | 163.3 |
| - | Bakary Jabbi | The Gambia | 2 | 7 | - | DNS | | |

=== Final ===
Final Date: Thursday 23 March 2006 Time: 20:50
| Place | Athlete | Nation | Order | Time | Record |
|---|---|---|---|---|---|
| 1 | Alex Kipchirchir | Kenya | 5 | 1:45.88 | |
| 2 | Achraf Tadili | Canada | 4 | 1:46.93 | |
| 3 | John Litei | Kenya | 3 | 1:46.98 | |
| 4 | Sherridan Kirk | Trinidad and Tobago | 6 | 1:47.45 | |
| 5 | Jason Stewart | New Zealand | 7 | 1:47.72 | |
| 6 | Nick Bromley | Australia | 1 | 1:50.45 | |
| 7 | Cosmas Rono | Kenya | 8 | 1:52.03 | |
| 8 | Onalenna Oabona | Botswana | 2 | 1:57.20 | |

Split
| Mark | Athlete | Nation | Time |
|---|---|---|---|
| 400 m | John Litei | Kenya | 53.67 s |
