= Dominica at the Commonwealth Games =

- CG code: DMA
- CGA: Dominica Olympic Committee
- Website: www.doc.dm
- Medals: Gold 1 Silver 2 Bronze 1 Total 4

Commonwealth Games appearances (overview)
- 1958; 1962; 1966; 1970; 1974–1990; 1994; 1998; 2002; 2006; 2010; 2014; 2018; 2022; 2026; 2030

Dominica have attended nine Commonwealth Games to date. The first came in 1958, with further appearances coming in 1962 and 1970, then they did not take part for twenty-four years. They have appeared at every Games since 1994. Dominica won its first ever Commonwealth Games medal at the 2018 Commonwealth Games.

During the 2018 Commonwealth Games, Thea LaFond of Dominica created history by becoming the first Dominican athlete to win a medal for Dominica at the Commonwealth Games after securing a bronze medal in the women's triple jump event.
