= 2002 World Junior Championships in Athletics – Men's 800 metres =

The men's 800 metres event at the 2002 World Junior Championships in Athletics was held in Kingston, Jamaica, at National Stadium on 16, 17 and 19 July.

== Medalists ==
Gold	Alex Kipchirchir; Kenya
Silver	Salem Amer Al-Badri; Qatar
Bronze	David Fiegen; Luxembourg

== Results ==
=== Final ===
19 July

Rank	Name	Nationality	Time	Notes
1st place, gold medalist(s)	Alex Kipchirchir	Kenya	1:46.59	
2nd place, silver medalist(s)	Salem Amer Al-Badri	Qatar	1:46.63	
3rd place, bronze medalist(s)	David Fiegen	Luxembourg	1:46.66	
4	Adam Abdou	Qatar	1:46.86	
5	Ismail Ahmed Ismail	Sudan	1:47.20	
6	José Manuel Cortés	Spain	1:47.44	
7	Mohamed Battani	Morocco	1:48.18	
8	Manuel Olmedo	Spain	1:56.73	

=== Semifinals ===
17 July

==== Semifinal 1 ====
Rank	Name	Nationality	Time	Notes
1	Alex Kipchirchir	Kenya	1:49.55	Q
2	Adam Abdou	Qatar	1:49.61	Q
3	Manuel Olmedo	Spain	1:49.72	Q
4	Yuriy Koldin	Russia	1:49.99	
5	Ricky Soos	United Kingdom	1:50.17	
6	Richard Smith	United States	1:50.29	
7	Prince Mumba	Zambia	1:50.96	
8	Andrew Ellerton	Canada	1:52.08	
9	Roman Fosti	Estonia	1:53.36	

==== Semifinal 2 ====
Rank	Name	Nationality	Time	Notes
1	Ismail Ahmed Ismail	Sudan	1:46.36	Q
2	David Fiegen	Luxembourg	1:46.40	Q
3	Salem Amer Al-Badri	Qatar	1:46.82	Q
4	José Manuel Cortés	Spain	1:46.92	q
5	Mohamed Battani	Morocco	1:48.46	q
6	Cosmas Rono Kipkorir	Kenya	1:49.83	
7	Antoine Martiak	France	1:52.37	
8	Frank Francois	United States	1:53.67	

=== Heats ===
16 July

==== Heat 1 ====
Rank	Name	Nationality	Time	Notes
1	Adam Abdou	Qatar	1:48.93	Q
2	Antoine Martiak	France	1:49.03	Q
3	Manuel Olmedo	Spain	1:49.21	q
4	Tom Osborne	New Zealand	1:52.16	
5	Mahmoud Abuattaya	Palestine	1:56.61	
6	Park Ji-Yun	South Korea	1:58.21	
7	Daryl Vassallo	Gibraltar	2:01.16	

==== Heat 2 ====
Rank	Name	Nationality	Time	Notes
1	Alex Kipchirchir	Kenya	1:48.26	Q
2	Ricky Soos	United Kingdom	1:48.82	Q
3	Andrew Ellerton	Canada	1:49.45	q
4	Roman Fosti	Estonia	1:50.23	q
5	Arno Hoevink	Netherlands	1:52.15	
6	Werner Botha	Australia	1:52.84	

==== Heat 3 ====
Rank	Name	Nationality	Time	Notes
1	David Fiegen	Luxembourg	1:49.86	Q
2	Frank Francois	United States	1:50.10	Q
3	Yuriy Koldin	Russia	1:50.15	q
4	Ibrahim Siddiq	Sudan	1:50.79	
5	Sylvester Chishiba	Zambia	1:51.00	
6	James Aaron	Australia	1:51.06	
7	Domen Znidaric	Slovenia	1:56.74	

==== Heat 4 ====
Rank	Name	Nationality	Time	Notes
1	Salem Amer Al-Badri	Qatar	1:49.63	Q
2	Ismail Ahmed Ismail	Sudan	1:50.13	Q
3	Onalenna Oabona	Botswana	1:50.48	
4	Walid Meliani	Algeria	1:50.62	
5	Jermaine Myers	Jamaica	1:50.93	
6	Bonolo Maboa	South Africa	1:51.25	
7	Prince Mumba	Zambia	1:51.86	q

==== Heat 5 ====
Rank	Name	Nationality	Time	Notes
1	José Manuel Cortés	Spain	1:49.28	Q
2	Mohamed Battani	Morocco	1:49.45	Q
3	Cosmas Rono Kipkorir	Kenya	1:49.62	q
4	Richard Smith	United States	1:50.17	q
5	Erik Sproll	Canada	1:50.57	
6	Thiago Chyaromont	Brazil	1:53.65	
7	Tai Payne	Guyana	2:09.88	

== Participation ==
According to an unofficial count, 34 athletes from 26 countries participated in the event.

- Algeria (1)
- Australia (2)
- Botswana (1)
- Brazil (1)
- Canada (2)
- Estonia (1)
- France (1)
- Gibraltar (1)
- Guyana (1)
- Jamaica (1)
- Kenya (2)
- Luxembourg (1)
- Morocco (1)
- Netherlands (1)
- New Zealand (1)
- Palestine (1)
- Qatar (2)
- Russia (1)
- Slovenia (1)
- South Africa (1)
- South Korea (1)
- Spain (2)
- Sudan (2)
- United Kingdom (1)
- United States (2)
- Zambia (2)
