= 2006 African Championships in Athletics – Men's 800 metres =

The men's 800 metres event at the 2006 African Championships in Athletics was held at the Stade Germain Comarmond on August 10–11.

== Medalists ==
Gold	Silver	Bronze
Alex Kipchirchir; Kenya	Ismail Ahmed Ismail; Sudan	Alfred Kirwa Yego; Kenya

== Results ==
=== Heats ===
Rank	Heat	Name	Nationality	Time	Notes
1	1	Alex Kipchirchir	Kenya	1:47.67	Q
2	1	Nabil Madi	Algeria	1:48.64	Q
3	1	Ismail Ahmed Ismail	Sudan	1:49.26	Q
3	2	Alfred Kirwa Yego	Kenya	1:49.26	Q
5	2	Mbulaeni Mulaudzi	South Africa	1:49.27	Q
6	2	Abdoulaye Wagne	Senegal	1:49.34	Q
7	2	Ismael Kombich	Kenya	1:49.35	q
8	2	Berhanu Alemu	Ethiopia	1:49.67	q
9	1	Reda Aït Douida	Morocco	1:49.73	
10	2	Onalenna Oabona	Botswana	1:50.00	
11	2	Saïd Doulal	Morocco	1:50.32	
12	1	Manoa Andrianjafy	Madagascar	1:51.10	
13	1	Goodson Chungu	Zambia	1:51.65	
14	1	Dominique Para	Mauritius	1:56.07	
15	1	Abdulla Mohamed Hussein	Somalia	1:56.70	

=== Final ===
Rank	Name	Nationality	Time	Notes
1st place, gold medalist(s)	Alex Kipchirchir	Kenya	1:46.62	
2nd place, silver medalist(s)	Ismail Ahmed Ismail	Sudan	1:46.65	
3rd place, bronze medalist(s)	Alfred Kirwa Yego	Kenya	1:46.85	
4	Nabil Madi	Algeria	1:47.18	
5	Abdoulaye Wagne	Senegal	1:47.44	
6	Mbulaeni Mulaudzi	South Africa	1:47.94	
7	Ismael Kombich	Kenya	1:49.05	
8	Berhanu Alemu	Ethiopia	1:52.25	
