= Dominica at the 2026 Commonwealth Games =

- Flag of Dominica
- CG code: DMA
- CGA: Dominica Commonwealth Games Association
- Website: www.doc.dm

in Glasgow, Scotland 23 July 2026 – 2 August 2026
- Competitors: 3 in 2 sports
- Flag bearer: Thea LaFond
- Baton bearer: Jasmine Schofield
- Medals Ranked =23rd: Gold 1 Silver 0 Bronze 0 Total 1

Commonwealth Games appearances (overview)
- 1958; 1962; 1966; 1970; 1974–1990; 1994; 1998; 2002; 2006; 2010; 2014; 2018; 2022; 2026; 2030

Dominica competed at the 2026 Commonwealth Games in Glasgow, Scotland. This marked Dominica's 12th participation at the games, after making its debut at the 1958 Commonwealth Games.

The King's Baton relay stopped in Dominica in April 2025.

The Dominica team consisted of three athletes competing in two sports: athletics and swimming. The delegation also consisted of three officials. Thea LaFond served as the country's opening ceremony flagbearer. Meanwhile, swimmer Jasmine Schofield was the baton bearer during the opening ceremony.

Dominica won its first ever Commonwealth Games gold medal when Thea LaFond won the gold medal in the women's triple jump event. With this, LaFond has won a medal of each colour at the Commonwealth Games, and three of the country's four Commonwealth medals.

== Competitors ==
The following is the list of number of competitors participating at the Games per sport/discipline.

Sport	Men	Women	Total
Athletics	1	1	2
Swimming	0	1	1
Total	1	2	3

== Medallist ==
The following competitor won a medal at the games. In the by discipline sections below, medallists' names are bolded.

Medal	Name	Sport	Event	Date	Ref.
Gold	Thea LaFond	Athletics	Women's triple jump	30 July	

== Athletics ==
Dominica entered two athletes (one per gender). Thea LaFond would win the gold medal in the triple jump. Meanwhile Dennick Luke finished fourth in the men's 400 metres hurdles.

Track event

Athlete	Event	Semifinal		Final	
Athlete	Event	Result	Rank	Result	Rank
Dennick Luke	Men's 400 m hurdles	49.07	5 **Q**	49.27	4

Field event

Athlete	Event	Final	
Athlete	Event	Distance	Rank
**Thea LaFond**	Women's triple jump	14.60	1st place, gold medalist(s)

== Swimming ==
Dominica entered one swimmer.

Women

Athlete	Event	Heat		Semifinal		Final	
Athlete	Event	Time	Rank	Time	Rank	Time	Rank
Jasmine Schofield	50 m freestyle	28.85	55	Did not advance			
Jasmine Schofield	100 m freestyle	1:02.71	50	Did not advance			
Jasmine Schofield	200 m freestyle	2:19.61 **NR**	35	Did not advance			
Jasmine Schofield	50 m butterfly	31.23	45	Did not advance			
