= Dominica at the 2018 Commonwealth Games =

- Flag of Dominica
- CGF code: DMA
- CGA: Dominica Olympic Committee
- Website: www.doc.dm

in Gold Coast, Australia 4 April 2018 – 15 April 2018
- Competitors: 13 in 3 sports
- Medals Ranked 33rd: Gold 0 Silver 1 Bronze 1 Total 2

Commonwealth Games appearances (overview)
- 1958; 1962; 1966; 1970; 1974–1990; 1994; 1998; 2002; 2006; 2010; 2014; 2018; 2022; 2026; 2030

Dominica competed at the 2018 Commonwealth Games in the Gold Coast, Australia from April 4 to April 15, 2018. It was Dominica's 10th appearance at the Commonwealth Games. Dominica won their first two Commonwealth Games medals at these games

The Dominican team consisted of 13 athletes (ten men and three women) that competed in three sports.

== Medalists ==
Medal	Name	Sport	Event	Date
Silver	Yordanys Durañona	Athletics	Men's Triple Jump	April 14
Bronze	Thea LaFond	Athletics	Women's Triple Jump	April 10

== Competitors ==
The following is the list of number of competitors participating at the Games per sport/discipline.

Sport	Men	Women	Total
Athletics (track and field)	8	2	10
Boxing	1	1	2
Cycling	1	0	1
Total	10	3	13

== Athletics (track and field) ==
Dominica entered ten athletes (eight men and two women).

Men
Track & road events

Athlete	Event	Heat		Semifinal		Final	
Athlete	Event	Result	Rank	Result	Rank	Result	Rank
Mitchel Davis	200 m	21.75	4	Did not advance			
Derick St Jean	400 m	47.27	6	Did not advance			
Judah Corriette	800 m	1:57.79	9	—		Did not advance	

Field events

Athlete	Event	Qualification		Final	
Athlete	Event	Distance	Rank	Distance	Rank
David Registe	Long jump	7.59	15	Did not advance	
Bavon Sylvain	Long jump	NM		Did not advance	
Yordanys Durañona	Triple jump	16.75	1 Q	16.86	2nd place, silver medalist(s)
Dillon Simon	Shot put	19.44	5 Q	18.44	10
Andre Bazil	Javelin throw	65.81	19	Did not advance	

Women
Field events

Athlete	Event	Qualification		Final	
Athlete	Event	Distance	Position	Distance	Position
Mariah Toussaint	Long jump	5.67	18	Did not advance	
Thea LaFond	Triple jump	—		13.92	3rd place, bronze medalist(s)

== Boxing ==
Dominica participated with a team of 2 athletes (1 man and 1 woman).

Athlete	Event	Round of 32	Round of 16	Quarterfinals	Semifinals	Final	Rank
Athlete	Event	Opposition Result	Opposition Result	Opposition Result	Opposition Result	Opposition Result	Rank
Roy Cooke	Men's −75 kg	Benny Muziyo (ZAM); L KO	did not advance				
Valerian Spicer	Women's −57 kg	—	Vikki Glover (SCO); L 1-4	did not advance			

== Cycling ==
Dominica participated with 1 athlete (1 man).

=== Road ===
Men

Athlete	Event	Time	Rank
Bram Sanderson	Road race	DNF	
Bram Sanderson	Time trial	1:02:47.28	49

== See also ==
- Dominica at the 2018 Summer Youth Olympics
