= 2003 African Junior Athletics Championships =

6th African Junior Championships
- Dates: 31 July – 3 August
- Host city: Garoua, Cameroon
- Level: Under-20
- Events: 44

The 2003 African Junior Athletics Championships was the sixth edition of the biennial, continental athletics tournament for African athletes aged 19 years or younger. It was held in Garoua, Cameroon, from 31 July to 3 August. A total of 44 events were contested, 22 by men and 22 by women.

== Medal summary ==
=== Men ===
Event	Gold		Silver		Bronze	
100 metres (Wind: +3.7 m/s)	Emmanuel Ngom (CMR)	10.50 w	Peter Emelieze (NGR)	10.56 w	Jaysuma Saidy Ndure (GAM)	10.59 w
200 metres (Wind: +3.6 m/s)	Jaysuma Saidy Ndure (GAM)	21.23 w	Amr Ibrahim Mostafa Seoud (EGY)	21.40 w	Sammy Rono (KEN)	21.69 w
400 metres	Sammy Rono (KEN)	46.79	Wilson Lukungu Waiswa (UGA)	47.45	Gakologelwang Masheto (BOT)	47.83
800 metres	Cosmas Rono Kipkorir (KEN)	1:48.45	Onalenna Oabona (BOT)	1:49.39	Walid Meliani (ALG)	1:49.57
1500 metres	Tesfu Bekele (ETH)	3:42.6	Mohamed Moustaoui (MAR)	3:42.9	Vickson Polonet (KEN)	3:43.3
5000 metres	Boniface Toroitich Kiprop (UGA)	13:48.49	Daniel Kipchirchir Komen (KEN)	13:49.20	Mulugeta Wendimu (ETH)	13:56.23
10,000 metres	Boniface Toroitich Kiprop (UGA)	29:08.16	Mulugeta Wendimu (ETH)	29:17.43	Bernard Kipyego (KEN)	29:29.09
110 metres hurdles	Seleke Samake (SEN)	14.50	Nosa Erese (NGR)	14.52	Badr El-Amine (MAR)	14.95
400 metres hurdles	Badr El-Amine (MAR)	51.57	El Hadj Sethe Mbow (SEN)	51.76	Abderahmane Hamadi (ALG)	52.15
3000 metres steeplechase	Abraham Kebeto (ETH)	8:39.90	Brimin Kipruto (KEN)	8:46.74	Nathan Kibet Naibei (KEN)	8:54.45
4 × 100 m relay	Cameroon (CMR)	41.24	Algeria (ALG)	42.58	Senegal (SEN); Abdoulaye Ba; Abdou Dieme; Cheikh Ahmed Tidiane Ndiaye; Cheikh Amadou Drame	42.74
4 × 400 m relay	Kenya (KEN); Edwin Letting; Cosmas Rono Kipkorir; Vickson Polonet; Sammy Rono	3:11.71	Botswana (BOT); Bonno Modisenyane; Nchenami Siwane; Onalenna Oabona; Gakologelwang Masheto	3:14.23	Senegal (SEN); Mamadou Gueye; Abdou Dieme; Seleke Samake; Ndiss Kaba Badji	3:15.44
10,000 metres walk	Mohamed Ameur (ALG)	48:35.02	Zakarya Soulimane (ALG)	50:58.09	Mahmoud Mohamed (EGY)	51:57.83
High jump	Hamza Labadi (ALG)	2.06 m	Nazar El Nazir (SUD)	2.00 m	Kabelo Kgosiemang (BOT) Hans von Lieres (NAM)	1.95
Pole vault	Mohamed Karbib (MAR)	4.60 m	Mouncef Bouniya (MAR)	4.20 m	Only two athletes cleared a height	
Long jump	Robert Martey (GHA)	7.29 m	Ahmed Saad (EGY)	7.22 m	Maxwell Evenor (MRI)	7.11 m (w)
Triple jump	Ahmed El-Zoghbi (EGY)	15.44 m	Simon Ekpa (NGR)	15.01 m	Georges Hidjam (CMR)	13.29 m (w)
Shot put	Yasser Ibrahim Farag (EGY)	18.13 m	Elvino Pierre-Louis (MRI)	14.75 m	Pierre Ngarsou (CMR)	13.70 m
Discus throw	Omar El-Ghazaly (EGY)	61.87 m	Yasser Ibrahim Farag (EGY)	51.87 m	Elvino Pierre-Louis (MRI)	49.15 m
Hammer throw	Mohsen Anany (EGY)	68.41 m	Pierre Ngarsou (CMR)	29.42 m	Yasser Ibrahim Farag (EGY)	28.53 m
Javelin throw	Wahib Abdelwahab (EGY)	61.30 m	Mohamed Ali Yassir (SUD)	59.00 m	Elvino Pierre-Louis (MRI)	48.47 m
Decathlon	Ahmed Saad (EGY)	6290 pts	Mourad Souissi (ALG)	5743 pts	William Nken (CMR)	5525 pts

=== Women ===
Event	Gold		Silver		Bronze	
100 metres	Delphine Atangana (CMR)	11.42	Egone Kesiena (NGR)	11.93	Fatoumata Coly (SEN)	12.01
200 metres	Delphine Atangana (CMR)	23.40	Egone Kesiena (NGR)	24.57	Seyi Omojuwa (NGR)	24.57
400 metres	Nina Chigozie (NGR)	54.06	Queen Ogbemudia (NGR)	56.06	Ndèye Fatou Soumah (SEN)	57.14
800 metres	Aminata Sylla (SEN)	2:15.78	Marlyse Nsourou (GAB)	2:16.74	Julienne Ngo-Manyim (CMR)	2:23.81
1500 metres	Peninah Jepchumba (KEN)	4:15.35	Mariem Alaoui Selsouli (MAR)	4:18.37	Siham Hilali (MAR)	4:19.47
3000 metres	Mariem Alaoui Selsouli (MAR)	9:08.53	Peninah Jepchumba (KEN)	9:10.27	Anesie Kwizera (BDI)	9:13.47
5000 metres	Anesie Kwizera (BDI)	16:16.57	Fridah Domongole (KEN)	16:18.28	Hailé Lomitu (ETH)	16:31.86
100 metres hurdles	Gnima Faye (SEN)	13.59	Josephine Onyia (NGR)	13.76	Samira Harrouchi (ALG)	14.27
400 metres hurdles	Ajoke Odumusu (NGR)	61.19	Gnima Faye (SEN)	62.32	Lamia El-Habz (MAR)	62.55
2000 metres steeplechase	Loice Kiptoo (KEN)	6:45.71	Teresia Wangui Wachata (KEN)	7:02.22	Muna Durka (SUD)	7:14.72
4 × 100 m relay	Nigeria (NGR)	46.52	Cameroon (CMR)	46.72	Senegal (SEN); Maimouna Coundoul; Gnima Faye; Ndèye Soukeyne Sarr; Fatoumata Coly	46.84
4 × 400 m relay	Nigeria (NGR); Seyi Omojuwa; Aveeru; Ajoke Odumusu; Nina Chigozie	3:43.47	Cameroon (CMR); Elodie Kamegne; Johanna Monthe; Mariette Songwa; Delphine Atangana	3:44.82	Senegal (SEN); Fatou Diabaye; Aminata Sylla; Ndèye Maty Sall; Raissa Djihounouck	3:48.84
10,000 metres walk	Ghania Amzal (ALG)	53:09.0	Nashwa Ibrahim (EGY)	59:29.4	Rebecca Ngameni (CMR)	1:01:35
High jump	Mama Gassama (GAM)	1.60 m	Saoussan Ouahbi (MAR)	1.45 m	Only two athletes cleared a height	
Pole vault	Nisrine Dinar (MAR)	3.20 m	Only one competitor			
Long jump	Latifa Ezziraoui (MAR)	5.76 m	Irene Traore (BUR)	5.76 m	Saoussan Ouahbi (MAR)	5.74 m
Triple jump	Latifa Ezziraoui (MAR)	13.01 m	Marie Bahanag (CMR)	12.94 m	Nkiruka Domike (NGR)	12.92 m
Shot put	Carine Meka (CMR)	14.25 m	Amal Salem (EGY)	13.95 m	Sandrine Ngounou (CMR)	11.77 m
Discus throw	Amina Moudden (MAR)	47.49 m	Irène Lingani (BUR)	44.52 m	Jeanne D'arc Momus (MRI)	42.89 m
Hammer throw	Yasmin Ashraf (EGY)	48.62 m	Eman Al-Ashry (EGY)	45.26 m	Salima Ledhem (MAR)	44.60 m
Javelin throw	Safaa Mohamed (EGY)	44.25 m	Solange Chodjouenou (CMR)	38.32 m	Irène Lingani (BUR)	30.71 m
Heptathlon	Céline Laporte (SEY)	5235 pts	Saoussan Ouahbi (MAR)	3611 pts	Only two competitors	
