= 2006 African Championships in Athletics – Men's 1500 metres =

The men's 1500 metres event at the 2006 African Championships in Athletics was held at the Stade Germain Comarmond on August 13.

== Results ==
Rank	Name	Nationality	Time	Notes
1st place, gold medalist(s)	Alex Kipchirchir	Kenya	3:46.54	
2nd place, silver medalist(s)	Adil Kaouch	Morocco	3:46.72	
3rd place, bronze medalist(s)	Tarek Boukensa	Algeria	3:46.81	
4	Kamal Boulahfane	Algeria	3:47.05	
5	Mohamed Moustaoui	Morocco	3:47.06	
6	Johan Cronje	South Africa	3:48.08	
7	Shedrack Kibet Korir	Kenya	3:48.16	
8	Elkanah Angwenyi	Kenya	3:48.69	
9	Juan van Deventer	South Africa	3:50.60	
10	Johan Pretorius	South Africa	3:50.93	
11	Adugna Kumsa	Ethiopia	3:50.93	
12	Goodson Chungu	Zambia	3:53.99	
13	Barae Hhera	Tanzania	3:56.37	
14	Onalenna Oabona	Botswana	3:57.18	
15	Menon Ramsamy	Mauritius	3:57.61	
16	Mosutli Moeketsi	Lesotho	3:59.53	
	Enoch Adamu Dogonyaroh	Nigeria	DNF	
	Mohamed Ahmed Omar	Somalia	DNS	
