= Dominica at the 2014 Commonwealth Games =

- CGF code: DMA
- CGA: Dominica Olympic Committee
- Website: www.doc.dm

in Glasgow, Scotland
- Competitors: 11 in 3 sports
- Flag bearer: Brendan Williams
- Medals: Gold 0 Silver 0 Bronze 0 Total 0

Commonwealth Games appearances (overview)
- 1958; 1962; 1966; 1970; 1974–1990; 1994; 1998; 2002; 2006; 2010; 2014; 2018; 2022; 2026; 2030

Dominica competed in the 2014 Commonwealth Games in Glasgow, Scotland from 23 July to 3 August 2014.

== Athletics ==
Men
Track & road events

Athlete	Event	Heat		Semifinal		Final	
Athlete	Event	Result	Rank	Result	Rank	Result	Rank
Mitchel Davis	400 m	46.94	23 q	47.49	22	did not advance	
Erison Hurtault	400 m	47.02	24	did not advance			

Field Events

Athlete	Event	Qualification		Final	
Athlete	Event	Distance	Rank	Distance	Rank
David Registe	Long jump	7.70	10 q	7.52	10
Yordanis Durañona	Triple jump	16.05	10 q	15.81	8
Brendan Williams	High jump	2.06	21	did not advance	
Dillon Simon	Shot put	18.40	11 q	18.66	7

Women
Field events

Athlete	Event	Qualification		Final	
Athlete	Event	Distance	Position	Distance	Position
Thea LaFond	Triple jump	13.15	9 q	12.64	11
Thea LaFond	High jump	1.81	11 q	No Mark	

Key

- Note–Ranks given for track events are within the athlete's heat only
- Q = Qualified for the next round
- q = Qualified for the next round as a fastest loser or, in field events, by position without achieving the qualifying target
- NR = National record
- N/A = Round not applicable for the event

== Boxing ==
Women

Athlete	Event	Round of 16	Quarterfinals	Semifinals	Final	Rank
Athlete	Event	Opposition Result	Opposition Result	Opposition Result	Opposition Result	Rank
Valerian Spicer	Lightweight	Pritchard (NZL); W 3 – 0	Audley-Murphy (NIR); L 1 – 2	did not advance		

== Table Tennis ==
Singles

Athlete	Event	Group Stage			Round of 64	Round of 32	Round of 16	Quarterfinals	Semifinals	Final	Rank
Athlete	Event	Opposition Result	Opposition Result	Rank	Opposition Result	Opposition Result	Opposition Result	Opposition Result	Opposition Result	Opposition Result	Rank
Marlon Dyer	Men's singles	Lake (SKN); L 0 – 4	Sirisena (SRI); L 0 – 4	3	did not advance						
Dane Taylor	Men's singles	Ringui (KEN); L 0 – 4	Watson (JAM); L 0 – 4	3	did not advance						
Larrysa Dover	Women's singles	Benstrong (SEY); L 0 – 4	Phillips (WAL); L 0 – 4	3	did not advance						

Doubles

Athlete	Event	Round of 128	Round of 64	Round of 32	Round of 16	Quarterfinals	Semifinals	Final	Rank
Athlete	Event	Opposition Result	Opposition Result	Opposition Result	Opposition Result	Opposition Result	Opposition Result	Opposition Result	Rank
Marlon Dyer; Dane Taylor	Men's doubles	—	Trinidad and Tobago; L 0 – 3	did not advance					
Larrysa Dover; Dane Taylor	Mixed doubles	Saint Vincent and the Grenadines; L 0 – 3	did not advance						
