= Dominica at the 2022 Commonwealth Games =

- Flag of Dominica
- CG code: DMA
- CGA: Dominica Commonwealth Games Association
- Website: www.doc.dm

in Birmingham, England 28 July 2022 – 8 August 2022
- Competitors: 10 (8 men and 2 women) in 3 sports
- Flag bearers: Dennick Luke; Thea LaFond
- Medals Ranked =35th: Gold 0 Silver 1 Bronze 0 Total 1

Commonwealth Games appearances (overview)
- 1958; 1962; 1966; 1970; 1974–1990; 1994; 1998; 2002; 2006; 2010; 2014; 2018; 2022; 2026; 2030

Dominica competed at the 2022 Commonwealth Games held in Birmingham, England. This was Dominica's 11th appearance at the Commonwealth Games.

On 6 July 2022, a team of 11 athletes (eight men and three women) competing in three sports was named by the Dominica Commonwealth Games Association. Dennick Luke and Thea LaFond were the country's flagbearers during the opening ceremony.

== Medalists ==
Medal	Name	Sport	Event	Date
Silver	Thea LaFond	Athletics	Women's triple jump	5 August

== Competitors ==
The following is the list of number of competitors participating at the Games per sport/discipline.

Sport	Men	Women	Total
Athletics	5	2	7
Cycling	2	0	2
Swimming	1	0	1
Total	8	2	10

== Athletics ==
Dominica's athletics team consisted of five men and two women.

Men
Track and road events

Athlete	Event	Heat		Semifinal		Final	
Athlete	Event	Result	Rank	Result	Rank	Result	Rank
Derick St. Jean	400 m	48.51	6	Did not advance			
Judah Corriette	800 m	1:57.04	7	Did not advance			
Dennick Luke	800 m	DQ		Did not advance			

Field events

Athlete	Event	Qualification		Final	
Athlete	Event	Distance	Rank	Distance	Rank
Tristan James	Long jump	7.65	9 q	7.85	7
Dillon Simon	Shot put	—N/a		17.42	9

Women
Field events

Athlete	Event	Qualification		Final	
Athlete	Event	Distance	Rank	Distance	Rank
Mariah Toussaint	Long jump	NM		Did not advance	
Thea LaFond	Triple jump	—N/a		14.39	2nd place, silver medalist(s)

== Cycling ==
Dominica entered two male cyclists in the road cycling discipline.

=== Road ===
Men

Athlete	Event	Time	Rank
Kohath Baron	Road race	DNF	
Kevon Boyd	Road race	DNF	

== Swimming ==
Dominica entered one male swimmer. This will mark the country's sport debut in the sport at the Commonwealth Games.

Men

Athlete	Event	Heat		Semifinal		Final	
Athlete	Event	Time	Rank	Time	Rank	Time	Rank
Warren Lawrence	50 m freestyle	24.63	42	did not advance			
Warren Lawrence	100 m freestyle	53.59	45	did not advance			
Warren Lawrence	50 m backstroke	27.32	27	did not advance			
Warren Lawrence	100 m backstroke	1:00.13	27	did not advance			
Warren Lawrence	50 m butterfly	26.19	40	did not advance			
