= Cosmas Rono Kipkorir =

Kenyan middle-distance runner

Personal information
- Nationality: Kenyan
- Born: 12 December 1984 (age 41)

Sport
- Sport: Track and field
- Event: 800 metres

Achievements and titles
- Personal best(s): 800 m: 1:45.24 (2005); 1500 m: 3:39.54 (2005)
Medal record
Men's athletics
Representing Kenya
World Youth Championships
Silver medal – second place	2001 Debrecen	Men's 800 m

Cosmas Rono Kipkorir (born 12 December 1984) is a male Kenyan middle-distance runner who specializes in the 800 metres. At age category level, he was the silver medallist in the event at the World Youth Championships in Athletics in 2001 and the gold medallist at the 2003 African Junior Athletics Championships.

He represented his country at senior level at the 2006 Commonwealth Games. His personal best for the 800 m is 1:45.24 minutes.

== International competitions ==
Year	Competition	Venue	Position	Event	Notes
Representing Kenya
2001	World Youth Championships	Debrecen, Hungary	2nd	800 m	1:50.35
2002	World Junior Championships	Kingston, Jamaica	9th (sf)	800 m	1:49.83
2003	African Junior Championships	Garoua, Cameroon	1st	800 m	1:48.45
2006	Commonwealth Games	Melbourne, Australia	7th	800 m	1:52.03

== Personal bests ==
Event	Time	Date	Location	Ref
800 m	1:45.24	23 July 2005	Heusden-Zolder, Belgium	
1500 m	3:39.54	7 May 2005	Nairobi, Kenya	
