= Sherridan Kirk =

Tobagonian athlete

Personal information
- Born: February 11, 1981 (age 45) Tobago, Trinidad and Tobago

Sport
- Sport: Track and field
Medal record
Representing Trinidad and Tobago
CAC Junior Championships (U20)
Bronze medal – third place	2000 San Juan	4x400 m relay
Bronze medal – third place	1998 George Town	800 m
CARIFTA Games Junior (U20)
Silver medal – second place	1999 Fort-de-France	400m
Silver medal – second place	1998 Port of Spain	800m
Bronze medal – third place	1999 Fort-de-France	800m

Sherridan Kirk (born February 11, 1981, on Tobago) is an athlete from Trinidad and Tobago who specializes in the 800 metres and 4 x 400 metres relay. He attended the Kansas City Kansas Community College and Auburn University in the United States.

== Achievements ==
Year	Competition	Venue	Position	Event	Notes
Representing Trinidad and Tobago
1998	CARIFTA Games (U20)	Port of Spain, Trinidad and Tobago	2nd	800 m	1:51.81
1998	Central American and Caribbean Junior Championships (U20)	Georgetown, Cayman Islands	3rd	800 m	1:50.78
1999	CARIFTA Games (U20)	Fort-de-France, Martinique	2nd	400 m	47.22
1999	CARIFTA Games (U20)	Fort-de-France, Martinique	3rd	800 m	1:53.33
1999	CARIFTA Games (U20)	Fort-de-France, Martinique	1st	4x400 m	3:12.01
2000	Central American and Caribbean Junior Championships (U20)	San Juan, Puerto Rico	3rd	4x400 m	3:12.84
2000	World Junior Championships	Santiago, Chile	8th (sf)	400m	47.08
2000	World Junior Championships	Santiago, Chile	9th (h)	4×400m relay	3:10.99
2002	Commonwealth Games	Manchester, United Kingdom	11th (sf)	800 m	1:47.98
2002	Commonwealth Games	Manchester, United Kingdom	9th (h)	4x400 m	3:08.66
2003	Central American and Caribbean Championships	St. George's, Grenada	1st	800 m	1:49.10
2003	Central American and Caribbean Championships	St. George's, Grenada	3rd	4x400 m	3:04.48
2003	Pan American Games	Santo Domingo, Dominican Republic	5th	800 m	1:47.50
2003	Pan American Games	Santo Domingo, Dominican Republic	4th	4x400 m	3:05.28
2004	South American U23 Championships	Barquisimeto, Venezuela	1st	4x400m relay	3:05.55
2004	Olympic Games	Athens, Greece	51st (h)	800 m	1:48.12
2005	Central American and Caribbean Championships	Nassau, Bahamas	2nd	800 m	1:48.31
2005	Central American and Caribbean Championships	Nassau, Bahamas	2nd	4x400 m	3:01.43
2005	World Championships	Helsinki, Finland	31st (h)	800 m	1:48.77
2006	Commonwealth Games	Melbourne, Australia	4th	800 m	1:47.45
2006	Central American and Caribbean Games	Cartagena, Colombia	2nd	800 m	1:46.55
2007	NACAC Championships	San Salvador, El Salvador	9th (h)	800 m	1:53.99
2007	Pan American Games	Rio de Janeiro, Brazil	17th (h)	800 m	1:52.05

== Video Interview ==
- Flotrack.com Video Interview of Sheridan Kirk during the 100th Millrose Games
