= Ben Pattison =

British middle-distance runner

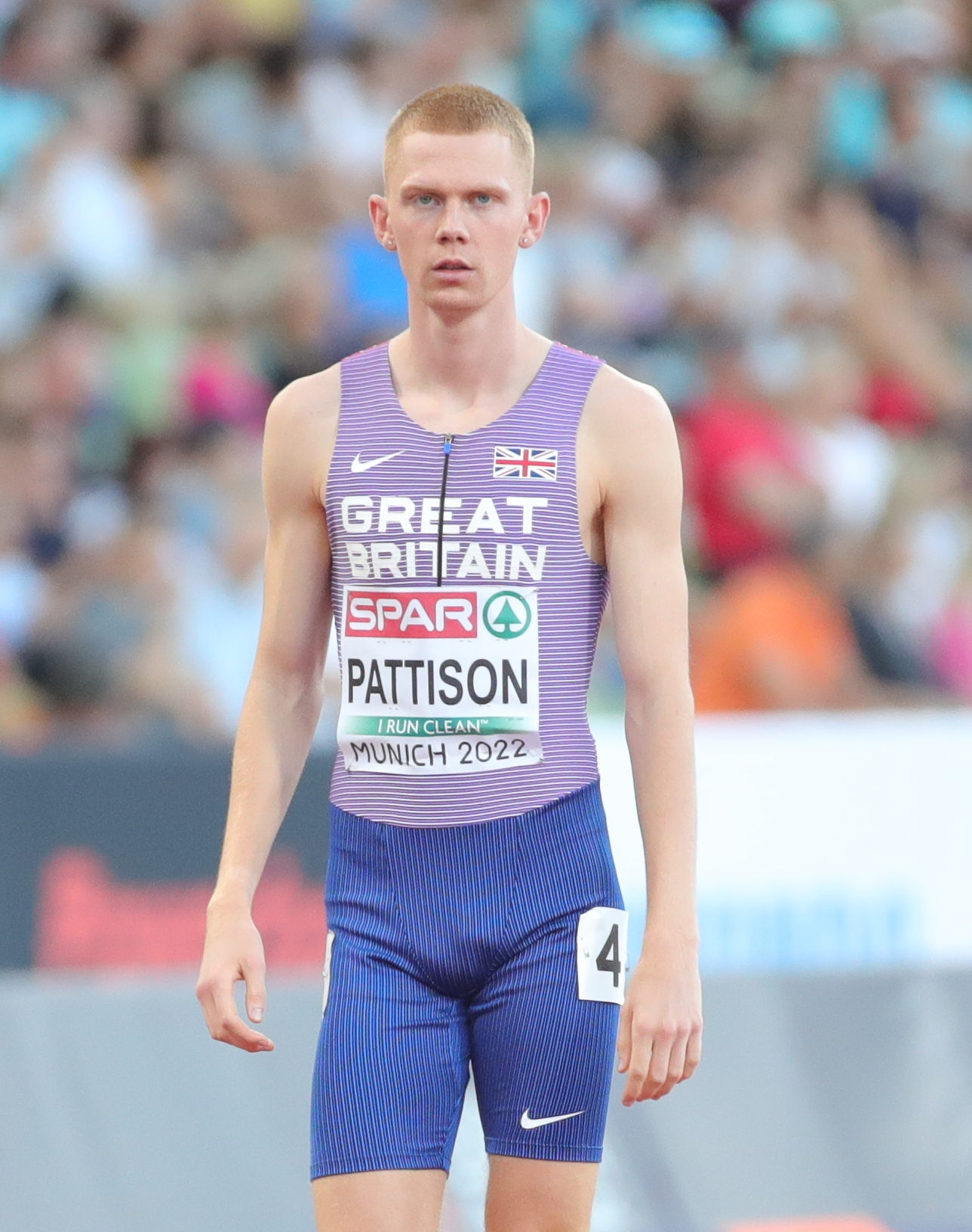
- Pattison 2022 in Munich

Personal information
- Nationality: British (English)
- Born: 15 December 2001 (age 24) Frimley, England

Sport
- Sport: Athletics
- Event: 800m
- Club: Basingstoke & Mid Hants
Medal record
Men's athletics
Representing Great Britain
World Championships
Bronze medal – third place	2023 Budapest	800 m
Representing England
Commonwealth Games
Bronze medal – third place	2022 Birmingham	800 m

Ben Pattison (born 15 December 2001) is a British middle-distance runner, who specializes in the 800 metres. Representing Great Britain in the 2023 World Athletics Championships, he won the bronze medal in the 800 metres, mirroring the medal he won for England at the 2022 Commonwealth Games.

== Biography ==
Pattison was educated at Loughborough University. He won a silver medal at the 2019 Under-20 European Championships. He finished fourth at the 2021 European U23 Championships and in 2022 recorded a personal best of 1.44.6 becoming the second fastest British runner that year.

In 2022, he was selected for the men's 800 metres event at the 2022 Commonwealth Games in Birmingham, where he won a bronze medal.

In 2023, Pattison won bronze in the 800 metres at the World Championships in Budapest.

After winning the 800m gold medal at the 2024 British Athletics Championships, Pattison was subsequently named in the Great Britain team for the 2024 Summer Olympics. Pattison got through to the semi-final in the 800m at the Olympics.

Pattison moved up to second place on the British all-time 800 metres list when he clocked a new personal best of 1:42.27 to finish fifth at the Herculis Meeting in Monaco on 12 July 2024.

== Personal life ==
Pattison was diagnosed with Wolff-Parkinson-White Syndrome at the age of 18. He had surgery performed during the COVID-19 pandemic which allowed him to continue running.

== Personal bests ==
Outdoor

- 400 metres – 46.76 (Loughborough 2022)
- 800 metres – 1:42.27 (Monaco 2024)
- 1500 metres – 3:39.14 (Loughborough 2022)

Indoor

- 800 metres – 1:49.04 (Manchester 2021)
