= Shantae Foreman =

Jamaican triple jumper (born 2002)

Personal information
- Nationality: Jamaican
- Born: 22 October 2002 (age 24)
- Home town: Kingston, Jamaica

Sport
- Sport: Athletics
- Events: Triple jump, Long jump
- University team: Clemson Tigers

Achievements and titles
- Personal bests: Triple jump: 14.24m (Eugene, 2026); Long jump: 6.69m (Eugene, 2026); High jump: 1.84m (Kingston, 2021)
Medal record
Women's athletics
Representing Jamaica
Commonwealth Games
Bronze medal – third place	2026 Glasgow	Triple jump
Pan American Championships U20
Silver medal – second place	2019 San Jose	Long jump
CARIFTA Games U20
Gold medal – first place	2018 Nassau	High jump

Shantae Foreman (born 22 October 2002) is a Jamaican triple jumper. She won the 2026 NCAA Championships and the bronze medal at the 2026 Commonwealth Games.

== Early life ==
Foreman is from Cow Bay in Saint Thomas Parish, Jamaica. As a junior athlete she won the ISSA/GraceKenedy Boys and Girls' Athletics Championships in the high jump in three consecutive years, setting age-group championship records. She was educated at Excelsior High School and St Jago High School in Jamaica, before attending Clemson University in the United States.

== Career ==
Foreman placed fourth overall in the long jump at the 2021 World Athletics U20 Championships in Nairobi, Kenya.

== 2024 ==
Whilst a sophomore at Clemson University, Foreman set a personal best with a leap of 13.39 meters in the women's triple jump at the Clemson Invitational in February 2024. She placed ninth at the 2024 NCAA Outdoor Championships in Eugene, Oregon with a jump of 13.30 metres, and fifth at the 2024 Jamaican Athletics Championships in Kingston, Jamaica, with a jump of 13.25 metres.

== 2025 ==
Foreman began 2025 with a jump of 13.84 meters in the triple jump at the Clemson Invitational in January 2025. In May 2025, she improved her personal best to 14.01 metres. The following month she placed fourth at the 2025 NCAA Outdoor Championships with a jump of 13.72 metres, and fourth at the Jamaican Athletics Championships in Kingston, with a jump of 13.54 metres.

== 2026 ==
Foreman jumped a personal best of 14.17 meters in the triple jump on 22 January 2026 at the Orange and Purple Invitational in Clemson. The jump moved her to number seven on the Jamaican all-time list. She placed second with a jump of 13.80 m at the 2026 NCAA Division I Indoor Track and Field Championships. She was selected to represent Jamaica in the triple jump at the 2026 World Athletics Indoor Championships in Toruń, Poland, and finished 17th in the with a best of 12.35 m. Foreman retained her title with 13.37 meters in May 2026 at the Atlantic Coast Conference Championships. She also jumped 6.59 metres in the long jump to place second behind Alyssa Jones, and later qualified for the 2026 NCAA Outdoor Championships in both the long jump and triple jump. At the championships, she moved to seventh on the NCAA all-time list for the triple jump winning with a new personal best of 14.24 metres. On 30 July, Foreman won the bronze medal at the 2026 Commonwealth Games in Glasgow, Scotland, jumping 13.96 metres.
