= Dominica at the 1962 British Empire and Commonwealth Games =

- CGF code: DMA
- CGA: Dominica Olympic Committee
- Website: www.doc.dm

in Perth, Western Australia
- Competitors: 1 in 1 sport
- Flag bearers: Opening: Closing:
- Medals: Gold 0 Silver 0 Bronze 0 Total 0

British Empire and Commonwealth Games appearances
- 1958; 1962; 1966; 1970; 1974–1990; 1994; 1998; 2002; 2006; 2010; 2014; 2018; 2022; 2026; 2030

Dominica competed at the 1962 British Empire and Commonwealth Games in Perth, Western Australia, from 22 November to 1 December 1962.

== Weightlifting ==
Men

Athlete	Event	Press		Snatch		Clean & Jerk		Total	Rank
Athlete	Event	Result	Rank	Result	Rank	Result	Rank	Total	Rank
N. da Silva	Middleweight	250 lb (110 kg)	3	240 lb (110 kg)	=5	320 lb (150 kg)	=3	810 lb (370 kg)	4
