= Achraf Tadili =

Canadian runner (born 1980)

Personal information
- Born: July 8, 1980 (age 45) Casablanca, Morocco
- Home town: Montreal, Canada

Sport
- Sport: Track and field
Medal record
Representing Canada
Pan American Games
Gold medal – first place	2003 Santo Domingo	800m
Commonwealth Games
Silver medal – second place	2006 Melbourne	800m

Achraf Tadili (born July 8, 1980, in Casablanca, Morocco) is a Canadian athlete competing over 800 metres. He competed at the 2004 and 2008 Summer Olympics. In 2025, Achraf was hired as coach of middle distance and cross country of Brébeuf Collège and the Mcgill University XC/TF teams.

== Achievements ==
Year	Competition	Venue	Position	Event	Notes
Representing Canada
1999	Pan American Junior Championships	Tampa, United States	3rd	800 m	1:49.78
2002	NACAC U25 Championships	San Antonio, United States	1st	800 m	1:48.19
2003	Pan American Games	Santo Domingo, Dominican Republic	1st	800 m	1:45.05
2003	World Championships	Paris, France	27th (h)	800 m	1:47.88
2004	Olympic Games	Athens, Greece	25th (h)	800 m	1:46.63
2005	World Championships	Helsinki, Finland	27th (h)	800 m	1:48.42
2006	Commonwealth Games	Melbourne, Australia	2nd	800 m	1:46.93
2007	Pan American Games	Rio de Janeiro, Brazil	4th	800 m	1:46.07
2007	World Championships	Osaka, Japan	35th (h)	800 m	1:46.73
2008	Olympic Games	Beijing, China	47th (h)	800 m	1:48.87
