= Dominica at the 2006 Commonwealth Games =

- CGF code: DMA
- CGA: Dominica Olympic Committee
- Website: www.doc.dm

in Melbourne, Australia
- Flag bearers: Opening: Closing:
- Medals: Gold 0 Silver 0 Bronze 0 Total 0

Commonwealth Games appearances (overview)
- 1958; 1962; 1966; 1970; 1974–1990; 1994; 1998; 2002; 2006; 2010; 2014; 2018; 2022; 2026; 2030

The Commonwealth of Dominica is represented at the 2006 Commonwealth Games in Melbourne. It did not win any medals at the games.

== Medals ==
	(gold)	(silver)	(bronze)	Total
Dominica	0	0	0	0
