= Athletics at the 2003 Pan American Games – Men's 800 metres =

Men's 800 metres at the Pan American Games

The final of the Men's 800 metres event at the 2003 Pan American Games took place on Wednesday August 6, 2003, with the heats staged a day earlier. The Moroccan-born Canadian Achraf Tadili ran a very quick finish to win in a record time of 1:45.05, faster than the previous Pan Am Record (1:45.38) set by USA’s Johnny Gray four years earlier in Winnipeg. Brazil’s Osmar dos Santos (1:45.64) could not respond to his rival’s late surge and finished second, ahead of his compatriot Fabiano Peçanha (1:46.39).

== Medalists ==
Gold	Achraf Tadili; Canada
Silver	Osmar dos Santos; Brazil
Bronze	Fabiano Peçanha; Brazil

== Records ==
World Record	Wilson Kipketer (DEN)	1:41.11	August 24, 1997	Cologne, Germany
Pan Am Record	Johnny Gray (USA)	1:45.38	July 25, 1999	Winnipeg, Canada

== Results ==
Rank	Athlete	Heats		Final
Rank	Athlete	Time	Rank	Time
1	Achraf Tadili (CAN)	1:49.70	6	1:45.05
2	Osmar dos Santos (BRA)	1:49.63	5	1:45.64
3	Fabiano Peçanha (BRA)	1:49.34	3	1:46.39
4	Jess Strutzel (USA)	1:49.58	4	1:46.45
5	Sherridan Kirk (TRI)	1:49.78	7	1:47.50
6	Ricardo Etheridge (PUR)	1:48.90	2	1:48.53
7	Marvin Watts (JAM)	1:50.18	8	1:48.98
8	Floyd Thompson (USA)	1:48.86	1	1:50.04
9	Jermaine Myers (JAM)	1:50.57	9	
10	Cristian Matute (ECU)	1:50.88	10	
11	Jean Destine (HAI)	1:51.20	11	

== See also ==
- 2003 World Championships in Athletics – Men's 800 metres
- Athletics at the 2004 Summer Olympics – Men's 800 metres
