= Athletics at the 2026 Commonwealth Games – Women's triple jump =

Women's triple jump at the 2026 Commonwealth Games
- Venue: Scotstoun Stadium, Glasgow
- Dates: 29 July (qualification); 30 July (final)
- Winning distance: 14.60 m

Medalists
gold medal	Thea LaFond	Dominica
silver medal	Ackelia Smith	Jamaica
bronze medal	Shantae Foreman	Jamaica

The women's triple jump at the 2026 Commonwealth Games, as part of the athletics programme, took place at Scotstoun Stadium from 29 to 30 July 2026.

== Records ==
Prior to this competition, the existing world, Commonwealth and Commonwealth Games records were as follows:

Women's Triple jump
World record	15.74 m	Yulimar Rojas (VEN)	20 Mar 2022	Štark Arena, Belgrade
Commonwealth record	15.39 m	Françoise Mbango Etone (CMR)	17 Aug 2008	Beijing, China
Games record	14.94 m	Shanieka Ricketts (JAM)	5 Aug 2022	Birmingham, England

== Schedule ==
The schedule is as follows:

Date	Time	Round
30 July 2026	19:25	Final

All times are British Summer Time (UTC+1)

== Results ==
=== Final ===
The final of the women's triple jump was scheduled for the evening of 30 July 2026.

Place	Athlete	Nation	#1	#2	#3	#4	#5	#6	Result	Notes
1st place, gold medalist(s)	Thea LaFond	Dominica	14.52 (+0.9 m/s)	14.23 (+2.5 m/s)	14.59 (+1.5 m/s)	14.60 (+0.7 m/s)	14.37 (+1.9 m/s)	x	14.60 m (+0.7 m/s)	
2nd place, silver medalist(s)	Ackelia Smith	Jamaica	13.93 (+2.2 m/s)	14.00 (+1.5 m/s)	13.88 (+2.1 m/s)	13.78 (+1.1 m/s)	x	14.04 (+1.0 m/s)	14.04 m (+1.0 m/s)	
3rd place, bronze medalist(s)	Shantae Foreman	Jamaica	13.96 (+1.3 m/s)	13.95 (+0.5 m/s)	x	13.38 (+1.5 m/s)	13.26 (+2.3 m/s)	x	13.96 m (+1.3 m/s)	
4	Desleigh Owusu	Australia	13.64 (+1.9 m/s)	13.81 (+1.1 m/s)	13.34 (+1.0 m/s)	12.80 (+1.3 m/s)	x	x	13.81 m (+1.1 m/s)	SB
5	Georgina Forde-Wells	England	13.70 (+1.7 m/s)	–	12.97 (+1.2 m/s)	x	–	x	13.70 m (+1.7 m/s)	
6	Madushani Herath	Sri Lanka	x	13.22 (+1.4 m/s)	13.19 (+2.1 m/s)	13.16 (+1.1 m/s)	13.15 (+1.5 m/s)	12.82 (+1.4 m/s)	13.22 m (+1.4 m/s)	
