= Athletics at the 2022 Commonwealth Games – Men's 800 metres =

Men's 800 metres at the 2022 Commonwealth Games
- Venue: Alexander Stadium
- Dates: 3 August (first round); 7 August (final)
- Competitors: 22 from 16 nations
- Winning time: 1:47.52

Medalists
gold medal	Wyclife Kinyamal	Kenya
silver medal	Peter Bol	Australia
bronze medal	Ben Pattison	England

The men's 800 metres at the 2022 Commonwealth Games, as part of the athletics programme, took place in the Alexander Stadium in Birmingham, England on 3 and 7 August 2022.

== Records ==
Prior to this competition, the existing world and Games records were as follows:

World record	David Rudisha (KEN)	1:40.91	London, United Kingdom	9 August 2012
Commonwealth record	David Rudisha (KEN)	1:40.91	London, United Kingdom	9 August 2012
Games record	Steve Cram (ENG)	1:43.22	Edinburgh, Scotland	31 July 1986

== Schedule ==
The schedule was as follows:

Date	Time	Round
Wednesday 3 August 2022	11:20	First round
Sunday 7 August 2022	19:35	Final

All times are British Summer Time (UTC+1)

== Results ==
=== First round ===
The first round consisted of three heats. The two fastest competitors per heat (plus next two fastest) advanced to the final.

Rank	Heat	Name	Result	Notes
1	2	Peter Bol (AUS)	1:47.01	Q
2	2	Boitumelo Masilo (BOT)	1:47.30	Q
3	2	Navasky Anderson (JAM)	1:47.79	q
4	3	Ben Pattison (ENG)	1:48.00	Q
5	3	Wyclife Kinyamal (KEN)	1:48.15	Q
6	3	Alex Amankwah (GHA)	1:48.26	q
7	3	Handal Roban (SVG)	1:48.57	
8	2	Cornelius Tuwei (KEN)	1:48.66	
9	1	Jamie Webb (ENG)	1:48.86	Q
10	3	Tshepiso Masalela (BOT)	1:49.12	
11	1	Guy Learmonth (SCO)	1:49.15	Q
12	1	Elias Ngeny (KEN)	1:49.53	
13	1	Tshepo Tshite (RSA)	1:49.82	
14	1	Charlie Hunter (AUS)	1:49.94	
15	3	Quamel Prince (GUY)	1:50.82	
16	2	Tom Dradriga (UGA)	1:51.40	
17	2	Nathan Hood (GRN)	1:51.81	
18	1	Alex Beddoes (COK)	1:52.72	SB
19	3	Nicholas Landeau (TTO)	1:53.69	
20	1	Kalique St. Jean (ANT)	1:56.48	
21	2	Judah Corriette (DMA)	1:57.04	
	1	Dennick Luke (DMA)	DQ	TR 17.3.1

=== Final ===
The medals were determined in the final.

Rank	Name	Result	Notes
1st place, gold medalist(s)	Wyclife Kinyamal (KEN)	1:47.52	
2nd place, silver medalist(s)	Peter Bol (AUS)	1:47.66	
3rd place, bronze medalist(s)	Ben Pattison (ENG)	1:48.25	
4	Jamie Webb (ENG)	1:48.60	
5	Navasky Anderson (JAM)	1:48.75	
6	Guy Learmonth (SCO)	1:48.82	
7	Alex Amankwah (GHA)	1:48.95	
8	Boitumelo Masilo (BOT)	1:49.35	
