= Ackelia Smith =

Jamaican athlete (born 2002)

Personal information
- Nationality: Jamaican
- Born: 5 February 2002 (age 24) Clarendon, Jamaica

Sport
- Sport: Track and field
- Events: Long jump, triple jump
- College team: Texas Longhorns

Achievements and titles
- Personal bests: Long jump: 7.08 m (Norman, 2023); Triple jump: 14.54 m (Austin, 2023)
Medal record
Women's athletics
Representing JAM
Commonwealth Games
Silver medal – second place	2026 Glasgow	Triple jump
Diamond League
Third place	2024 Brussels	Triple Jump
Carifta Games (U18)
Gold medal – first place	2018 Nassau	Long jump
Gold medal – first place	2018 Nassau	Triple jump

Ackelia Smith (born 5 February 2002) is a Jamaican track and field athlete who competes internationally in both the long jump and the triple jump.

== Career ==
Smith is listed as volunteer track and field coach for the Texas Longhorns.

== 2022 ==
In June 2022, Smith won the Jamaican national championship in long jump with a jump of 6.56 metres and finished runner-up in the triple jump with a distance of 13.93 metres. Prior to that, in the same month representing the University of Texas she had reached the finals of the NCAA championships in both events finishing eighth in the long jump (6.34 m) and fourth in the triple jump (13.79 m). Selected for the 2022 World Athletics Championships in the triple jump, Smith scored a big personal best of 14.36 metres to qualify for the final on her senior major championship debut. In the final Smith jumped 13.90 metres to finish in 12th place. Smith was selected for the long jump at the 2022 Commonwealth Games held in Birmingham, England and qualified for the final with a jump of 6.35 metres.

== 2023 ==
Smith was selected for the 2023 World Athletics Championships in Budapest in both the triple jump and the long jump. She did not qualify for the final in the triple jump. In the women's long jump, she finished eleventh in the final.

== 2024 ==
She won both the long jump and the triple jump at the NCAA Championships in Eugene, Oregon in June 2024. That month, she won the Jamaican national championships long jump title in Kingston, Jamaica. In July 2024, she was officially selected in the long jump and the triple jump for the Jamaican team to compete at the 2024 Paris Olympics. She finished seventh overall in the triple jump event and eighth overall in the long jump event at the 2024 Olympic Games.

== 2025 ==
She won the long jump and finished runner-up in the triple jump at the 2025 Jamaican Athletics Championships in Kingston. She placed sixth in the long jump at the 2025 Prefontaine Classic on 5 July.

In September 2025, she competed at the 2025 World Championships in Tokyo, Japan, qualifying for the final and placing eighth overall. She also competed at the women's long jump at the championships without qualifying for the final.

== 2026 ==
On 30 July 2026, Smith won the silver medal at the 2026 Commonwealth Games in Glasgow, Scotland, jumping 14.04 metres.
