= Samuel Egadu =

Ugandan sprinter (born 1988)

BACKGROUND

Samuel Egadu (born June 3, 1988, in Tororo) is a Ugandan athlete. He competed for Uganda at the 2006 Commonwealth Games.

He was named NEC Track Athlete of the week in 2009 and 2010 after posting a 200m run in 21.63s in 2010 and 21.76s in 2009.

Tragically, Samuel Egadu's promising athletic career and active life were severely altered by a devastating traffic accident. Road traffic accidents have historically posed a major hazard to athletes and the general public in East Africa, and Egadu's life-changing crash cut short his competitive running years. The accident resulted in severe physical trauma that made professional sprinting impossible, forcing him into an abrupt and involuntary retirement from competitive sports. Despite the physical toll and the immense psychological challenge of transitioning away from elite athletics, Egadu's legacy as a trailblazing Ugandan sprinter remains respected within the country's sporting community.
