= Nigeria at the 2006 Commonwealth Games =

- CGF code: NGR
- CGA: Nigeria Olympic Committee
- Website: www.nigeriaolympiccommittee.org

in Melbourne, Australia
- Flag bearers: Opening: Closing:
- Medals Ranked 12th: Gold 4 Silver 6 Bronze 7 Total 17

Commonwealth Games appearances (overview)
- 1950; 1954; 1958; 1962; 1966; 1970; 1974; 1978; 1982; 1986; 1990; 1994; 1998; 2002; 2006; 2010; 2014; 2018; 2022; 2026; 2030

Nigeria participated at the 2006 Commonwealth Games in Melbourne. It won 4 gold, 6 silver and 7 bronze medals.

== Medals ==
	(gold)	(silver)	(bronze)	Total
Nigeria	4	6	7	17

Medal	Name	Sport	Event	Date
Gold	Adekunle Adesoji	Athletics	Men's 100 m EAD T12	???
Gold	Njideka Iyiazi	Athletics	Women's Seated Shot Put EAD	???
Gold	Ruel Ishaku	Weightlifting	Open EAD Powerlifting	???
Gold	Monday Merotohun; Segun Toriola	Table Tennis	Men's Doubles	25 March
Silver	Olusoji Fasuba	Athletics	Men's 100 m	20 March
Silver	Virginia Ohagwu	Athletics	Women's Seated Shot Put EAD	???
Silver	Otonye Iworima	Athletics	Women's Triple Jump	21 March
Silver	Vivian Chukwuemeka	Athletics	Women's Shot Put	22 March

=== Silver ===
Boxing

(silver) Adura Olalehin, Men's Light Heavyweight (– 81 kg)

Table Tennis

(silver) Faith Obiora, Women's Singles EAD

=== Bronze ===
Athletics

(bronze) Etinosa Eriyo, Men's 100 m EAD T12
(bronze) Vitalis Lanshima, Men's 200 m EAD T46
(bronze) Christiana Ekpukhon, Folashade Abugan, Joy Eze, and Kudirat Akhigbe, Women's 4x400 m Relay

Boxing

(bronze) Nestor Bolum, Men's Bantamweight (– 54 kg)
(bronze) Olufemi Ajayi, Men's Welterweight (– 69 kg)

Table Tennis

(bronze) Kazeem Nasiru, Monday Merotohun, Segun Toriola, Seun Ajetun, and Tajudeen Jegede, Men's Team Competition
(bronze) Segun Toriola, Men's Singles

== Nigeria's Team at the 2006 Commonwealth Games ==
=== Athletics ===
==== Men's Competition ====
- Adekunle Adesoji
- Jelili Akanni
- Deji Aliu
- Uzodinma Alozie
- Charles Arosanyin
- Uchenna Emedolu
- Etinosa Eriyo
- Peter Emelieze
- Soji Fasuba
- James Godday
- Anthony Imbimoh
- Vitalis Lanshima
- Bola Gee Lawal
- Godwin Mbakara
- Audu Musa
- Salim Nurudeen
- Lee Okoroafu
- Osazuwa Osamudiame
- Enefiok Udo-Obong
- Saul Weigopwa

==== Women's Competition ====
- Folashade Abugan
- Olufunke Adeoye
- Esther Aghatise
- Kudirat Akhigbe
- Vivian Chukwuemeka
- Joy Digha
- Jane Dike
- Nkiruka Domike
- Grace Ebor
- Christiana Ekpukhon
- Oluwabunmi Eluwole
- Joy Eze
- Otonye Iworima
- Njideka Iyiazi
- Mercy Nku
- Patricia Nnaji
- Funmilola Ogundana
- Chinonyelum Ohadugha
- Virginia Ohagwu
- Endurance Ojokolo
- Tina Okparaugo
- Chinedu Onikeku
- Omolola Sangodeyi

=== Boxing ===
Men's Light Flyweight (– 48 kg)

- Lukumon Akinolugbade

Men's Flyweight (– 51 kg)

- Saheed Oladele Olawale

Men's Bantamweight (– 54 kg)

- Nestor Bolum

Men's Lightweight (– 60 kg)

- Rasheed Lawal

Men's Light Welterweight (– 64 kg)

- Chukwudi Nwaiwu

Men's Welterweight (– 69 kg)

- Olufemi Ajayi

Men's Middleweight (– 75 kg)

- Davidson King Emenogu

Men's Light Heavyweight (– 81 kg)

- Adura Olalehin

Men's Heavyweight (– 91 kg)

- Emmanuel Izonritei

Men's Super Heavyweight (+ 91 kg)

- Olanrewaju Durodola

=== Field Hockey ===
==== Women's team ====
- Ladi Rogers
- Helen Obialor
- Christy Bulus
- Queen Anuwa
- Ajuma Ejegwa
- Lucy Micheal Aleji
- Lorinda Sati Yohanna
- Justina Onyedum
- Christy Agbo
- Oluchi Obiefule
- Itohan Evbenafese
- Ijenwa Okah
- Lilian Obasi
- Susan Bulus
- Serah Izang
- Patricia Uzuebu

Head coach: Christian Kubeinje

=== Basketball ===
==== Men's team ====
- 4-Chidozie Nwoye
- 5-Ogoh Odaudu
- 6-Dennis Ebikoro
- 7-Abubakar Usman
- 8-Stanley Gumut
- 9-Abdulrahman Mohammed (captain)
- 10-Baba Jubril
- 11-Priwitt Gagara
- 12-Edem Ekpenyong
- 13-Nnadubem Muoneke
- 14-Ejike Ugboaja
- 15-Olumide Oyedeji

Head coach: Sani Ahmed

==== Women's team ====
- 4-Amaka Adibeli
- 5-Tamunomiete Whyte
- 6-Mobolaji Akiode
- 7-Mercy Okorie (captain)
- 8-Funmi Ojelabi
- 10-Tayeloly Adeniyi
- 11-Adenike Dawodu
- 12-Parricia Chukwuma
- 13-Rashidat Sadiq
- 14-Chioma Udeaja
- 15-Ezinne James

Head coach Scott Nnaji

== See also ==
- Nigeria at the 2004 Summer Olympics
- Nigeria at the 2008 Summer Olympics
