= John Litei =

Kenyan middle-distance runner

John Litei Nkamasiai (born 2 June 1983) is a Kenyan middle distance runner. He was the bronze medalist in the Men's 800 metres at the 2006 Commonwealth Games.

He is one of the coaches of Global Sports Communications, a management company that manages Eliud Kipchoge. Being a sprinter himself, he has excelled in coaching track athletes. Among athletes he trained are the world junior record holder in 1500m Ronald Kwemoi and Samwel Chebolei Masai.
