= Virginia Ohagwu =

Nigerian Paralympic athlete

Personal information
- Full name: Virginia Ohagwu
- Born: Nigeria
Medal record
Women's para-athletics
Representing Nigeria
Commonwealth Games
Silver medal – second place	2002 Manchester	Women's Shot - Seated
Silver medal – second place	2006 Melbourne	Women's Seated Shot Put

Virginia Ohagwu is a Paralympian athlete from Nigeria. She represents Nigeria in the shot put - seated category. She won two silver medals at the Commonwealth games held in 2002 and 2006.

== Achievements ==
Ohagwu competed in the 2002 Commonwealth Games in Manchester, England where she won a silver medal after representing Nigeria in the Women's Shot put - Seated event with a result of 8.76m.

She also won a silver medal after having participated also in the Women's Seated Shot Put event at the 2006 Commonwealth Games held in Melbourne.
