= Grenada at the 2006 Commonwealth Games =

Sporting event delegation

Flag of Grenada

The Official Logo of the Grenada Commonwealth Games Association

Grenada participated in the 2006 Commonwealth Games in Melbourne. Until 2014, Alleyne Francique's silver medal in the 400 metres was the sole Grenadian Commonwealth Games medal.

== Medals ==
	(gold)	(silver)	(bronze)	Total
Grenada	0	1	0	1

=== Silver ===
- Alleyne Francique — Athletics, Men's 400 metres

== See also ==
- Grenada at the 2007 Pan American Games
- Grenada at the 2008 Summer Olympics
