= Alfred Kirwa Yego =

Kenyan middle distance runner (born 1986)

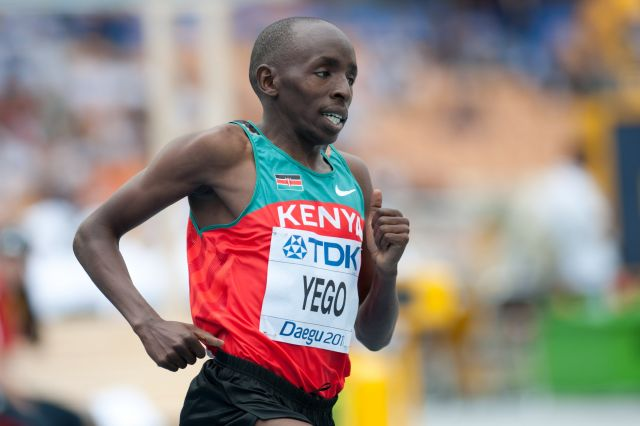

Personal information
- Nationality: Kenyan
- Born: 28 November 1986 (age 39) Eldoret, Kenya
- Height: 1.75 m (5 ft 9 in)
- Weight: 56 kg (123 lb)

Sport
- Sport: Athletics
- Event: 800 m
Medal record
Men's athletics
Representing Kenya
Olympic Games
Bronze medal – third place	2008 Beijing	800 m
World Championships
Gold medal – first place	2007 Osaka	800 m
Silver medal – second place	2009 Berlin	800 m
African Championships
Silver medal – second place	2010 Nairobi	800 m
Bronze medal – third place	2006 Bambous	800 m

Alfred Kirwa Yego (born 28 November 1986) is a Kenyan middle-distance runner who specializes in the 800 metres. He is best known for winning the gold medal in the 800 m at the 2007 World Championships.

Yego competed at the 2005 World Championships, but did not advance past 800 metres heats.

His coach is Claudio Berardelli, who has also coached olympic medalists Janeth Jepkosgei and Nancy Lagat Yego won the silver at the 2009 World Championships in the 800 m. A few weeks afterwards, he improved his 800 m personal best to 1:42.67 min in Rieti, finishing second behind David Rudisha who ran a new African record.

== Achievements ==
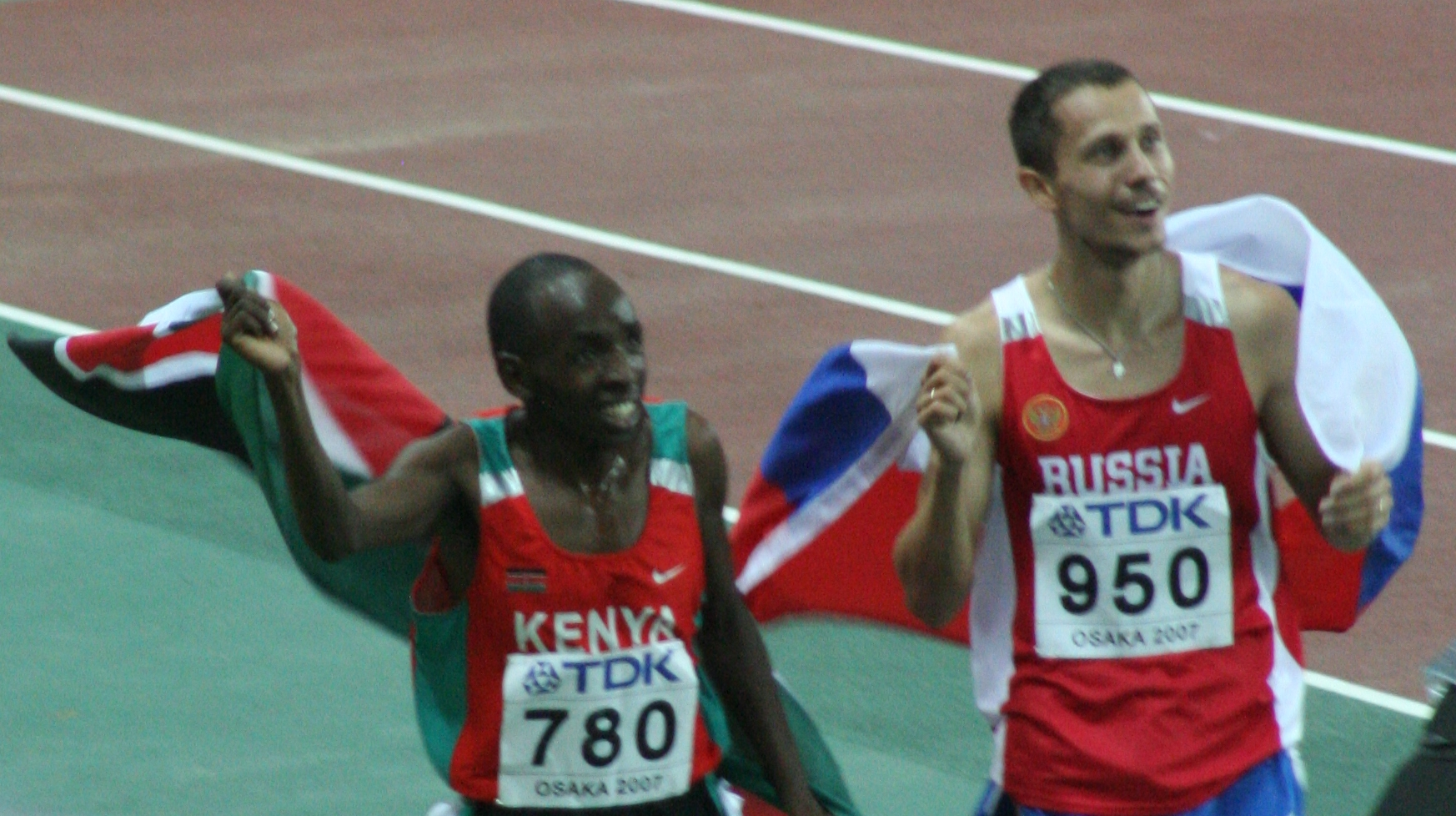
Alfred Yego (on the left) in Osaka 2007.

Year	Competition	Venue	Position	Notes
Representing Kenya
2004	World Junior Championships	Grosseto, Italy	2nd	1:47.39
2005	World Championships	Helsinki, Finland	30th (h)	1:48.72
2005	World Athletics Final	Monte Carlo, Monaco	6th	1:47.39
2006	African Championships	Bambous, Mauritius	3rd	1:46.85
2006	World Athletics Final	Stuttgart, Germany	8th	1:48.01
2007	World Championships	Osaka, Japan	1st	1:47.09
2008	Olympic Games	Beijing, China	3rd	1:44.82
2008	World Athletics Final	Stuttgart, Germany	1st	1:49.05
2009	World Championships	Berlin, Germany	2nd	1:45.35
2009	World Athletics Final	Thessaloniki, Greece	7th	1:46.66
2010	African Championships	Nairobi, Kenya	2nd	1:44.85
2011	World Championships	Daegu, South Korea	7th	1:45.83

=== Personal bests ===
- 800 metres – 1:42.67 min (2009)
- 1500 metres – 3:33.68 min (2009)
