= Athletics at the 2018 Commonwealth Games – Women's triple jump =

Women's triple jump at the 2018 Commonwealth Games
- Venue: Carrara Stadium
- Dates: 10 April
- Competitors: 12 from 10 nations
- Winning distance: 14.64 m

Medalists
gold medal	Kimberly Williams	Jamaica
silver medal	Shanieka Ricketts	Jamaica
bronze medal	Thea LaFond	Dominica

The women's triple jump at the 2018 Commonwealth Games, as part of the athletics programme, took place in Carrara Stadium on 10 April 2018. Bronze medalist Thea LaFond was the first Dominican athlete to win a medal at the Commonwealth Games.

== Records ==
Prior to this competition, the existing world and Games records were as follows:

World record	Inessa Kravets (UKR)	15.50 m	Gothenburg, Sweden	10 August 1995
Games record	Ashia Hansen (ENG)	14.86 m	Manchester, England	31 July 2002

== Schedule ==
The schedule was as follows:

Date	Time	Round
Tuesday 10 April 2018	19:35	Final

All times are Australian Eastern Standard Time (UTC+10)

== Results ==
With twelve entrants, the event was held as a straight final.

=== Final ===
Rank	Name	#1	#2	#3	#4	#5	#6	Result	Notes
1st place, gold medalist(s)	Kimberly Williams (JAM)	x +0.6 m/s	14.34 +0.6 m/s	x +0.8 m/s	14.37 +1.2 m/s	x +0.5 m/s	14.64 +0.7 m/s	14.64	PB
2nd place, silver medalist(s)	Shanieka Ricketts (JAM)	14.52 +1.0 m/s	x +0.7 m/s	14.33 +1.2 m/s	14.16 +0.6 m/s	14.39 +0.8 m/s	x +1.0 m/s	14.52	SB
3rd place, bronze medalist(s)	Thea LaFond (DMA)	13.82 +0.2 m/s	13.52; 0.0 m/s	13.92 +0.3 m/s	13.62 +0.6 m/s	x +0.6 m/s	13.62 +0.6 m/s	13.92	
4	Lerato Sechele (LES)	13.10 +1.4 m/s	13.57 +0.6 m/s	11.57 +0.9 m/s	13.21 +0.1 m/s	13.22 +0.5 m/s	13.29 +1.3 m/s	13.57	NR
5	Blessing Ibrahim (NGR)	13.20 +0.2 m/s	13.48 +0.4 m/s	x +1.1 m/s	12.99 +0.8 m/s	13.27 +0.9 m/s	13.00 +0.9 m/s	13.48	
6	Ayanna Alexander (TTO)	13.39 +0.9 m/s	13.47 +0.8 m/s	x +0.6 m/s	13.34 +0.9 m/s	13.21 +1.5 m/s	13.27 +1.1 m/s	13.47	
7	Joëlle Mbumi Nkouindjin (CMR)	13.22 +1.4 m/s	13.45 +0.7 m/s	13.10 +0.9 m/s	12.93 +0.5 m/s	x +1.1 m/s	13.04 +0.8 m/s	13.45	
8	Natricia Hooper (GUY)	13.07 +1.3 m/s	13.19 +0.3 m/s	13.36 +1.3 m/s	13.24 +1.2 m/s	13.34 +0.9 m/s	11.64 +0.7 m/s	13.36	PB
9	Tamara Myers (BAH)	x +1.3 m/s	13.06 +0.2 m/s	13.15 +1.1 m/s	—			13.15	
10	Nadia Eke (GHA)	13.05 +0.3 m/s	x +1.0 m/s	12.86 +1.1 m/s	—			13.05	
11	Natrena Hooper (GUY)	12.32 +0.6 m/s	12.62 +0.8 m/s	12.04 +1.3 m/s	—			12.62	SB
–	Rellie Kaputin (PNG)	x +0.6 m/s	x +0.4 m/s	x +0.9 m/s	—			NM	
