= Jason Stewart (runner) =

New Zealand runner

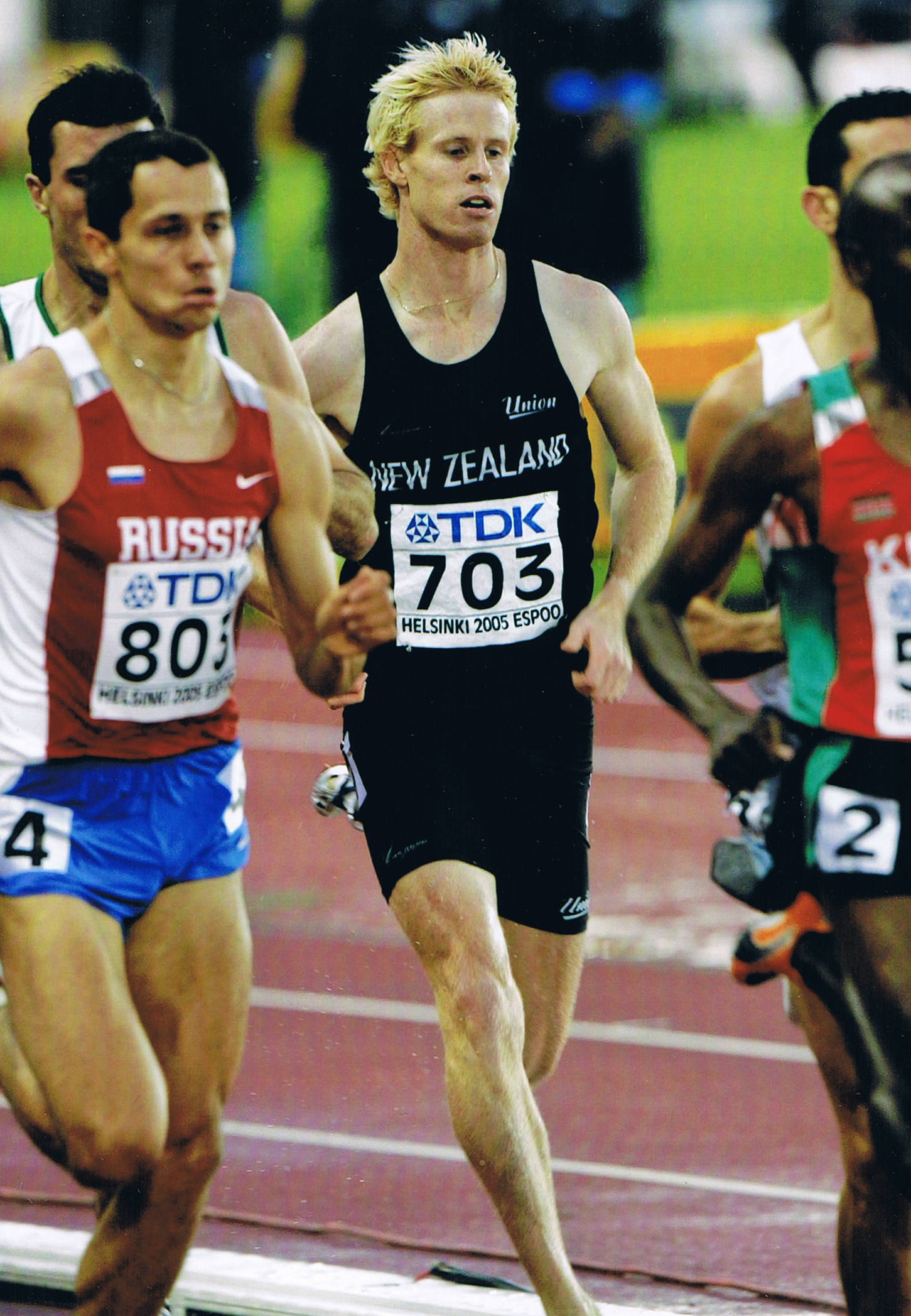
- Stewart (centre) at the 2005 World Championships

Personal information
- Full name: Jason Ron Stewart
- Born: 21 November 1981 (age 44) Napier, New Zealand
- Height: 1.87 m (6 ft 2 in)
- Weight: 75 kg (165 lb)

Sport
- Country: New Zealand
- Sport: Middle-distance running
- Club: Napier
- Retired: 2008

Achievements and titles
- Highest world ranking: 31 (2005)
- Personal bests: 800m: 1:46.19 (Huesden-Zolder, 2005); 1500m: 3:42.39 (Rehlingen, 2004)

Jason Ron Stewart (born 21 November 1981) is a former New Zealand middle-distance runner.

== Junior years ==
Stewart is the former national record holder in the 800m for the u/18 (1.51.49) and u/20 (1.48.73) age group categories.

In 2000 he finished 7th over 800m at the IAAF World Junior Athletics Championship in Santiago, Chile.

== Senior achievements ==
In addition to 2 National titles over 800m (2002,2006), Stewart represented New Zealand in the 2004 Olympic Games in Athens, the 2005 World Championships in Helsinki, the 2006 Commonwealth Games in Melbourne (5th place) and represented the Oceania region at the 2006 IAAF World Cup of Athletics in Athens (8th place) .

He achieved a career-best IAAF world ranking of 31 for the 800 metres in 2005

== Post-retirement ==
Following his career, Stewart worked for Adidas as part of a team tasked with designing new running shoes.
