= Athletics at the 2006 Commonwealth Games =

Athletics at the 18th Commonwealth Games
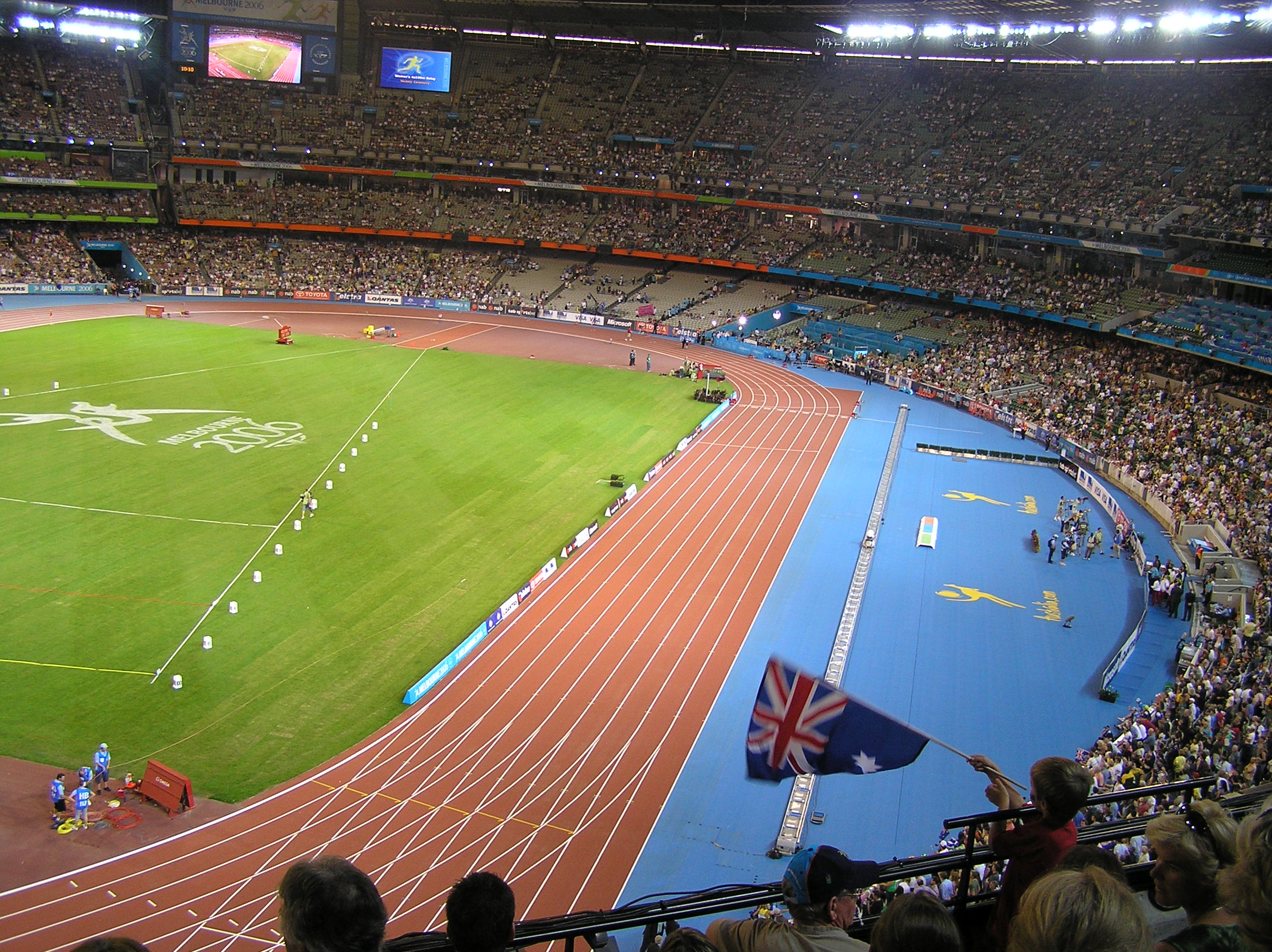
- The host stadium in Melbourne
- Dates: 19–25 March 2006
- Host city: Melbourne, Australia
- Venue: Melbourne Cricket Ground
- Level: Senior
- Events: 47 (+6 disability)
- Participation: 748 (+disabled) athletes from 63 nations
- Records set: 11 Games records

At the 2006 Commonwealth Games, the athletics events were held in Melbourne, Australia from 19 March to 25 March 2006. A total of 47 events were contested, of which 24 by male and 23 by female athletes. Furthermore, three men's and three women's disability events were held within the programme. All athletics events took place within the Melbourne Cricket Ground, while the marathon and racewalking events took place on the streets of Melbourne and finished at the main stadium.

The hosts Australia easily won the medals table with 16 golds and 41 medals in total. Jamaica came second with 10 golds and 22 medals, while Kenya and England were the next best performers. A total of eleven Games records were broken over the course of the seven-day competition. Six of the records were broken by Australian athletes.

== Medal summary ==
=== Men ===
Event	Gold		Silver		Bronze	
100 metres	Asafa Powell; Jamaica	10.03 s	Olusoji Fasuba; Nigeria	10.11 s	Marc Burns; Trinidad and Tobago	10.17 s
200 metres	Omar Brown; Jamaica	20.47 s	Stéphan Buckland; Mauritius	20.47 s	Chris Williams; Jamaica	20.52 s
400 metres	John Steffensen; Australia	44.73 s	Alleyne Francique; Grenada	45.09 s	Jermaine Gonzales; Jamaica	45.16 s
800 metres	Alex Kipchirchir Rono; Kenya	1:45.88 min	Achraf Tadili; Canada	1:46.93 min	John Litei Nkamasiai; Kenya	1:46.98 min
1500 metres	Nicholas Willis; New Zealand	3:38.49 min	Nathan Brannen; Canada	3:39.20 min	Mark Fountain; Australia	3:39.33 min
5000 metres	Augustine Choge; Kenya	12:56.41 min GR	Craig Mottram; Australia	12:58.19 min	Benjamin Limo; Kenya	13:05.30 min
10,000 metres	Boniface Kiprop Toroitich; Uganda	27:50.99 min	Geoffrey Kipngeno; Kenya	27:51.16 min	Fabiano Joseph Naasi; Tanzania	27:51.99 min
110 metre hurdles	Maurice Wignall; Jamaica	13.26 s	Chris Baillie; Scotland	13.61 s	Andy Turner; England	13.62 s
400 metre hurdles	L.J. van Zyl; South Africa	48.05 s GR	Alwyn Myburgh; South Africa	48.23 s	Kemel Thompson; Jamaica	48.65 s
3000 metre steeplechase	Ezekiel Kemboi; Kenya	8:18.17 min	Wesley Kiprotich Koech; Kenya	8:19.38 min	Reuben Kosgei Seroney; Kenya	8:19.82 min
4 × 100 metre relay	Jamaica (JAM); Michael Frater; Ainsley Waugh; Chris Williams; Asafa Powell	38.36 s	South Africa (RSA) Lee-Roy Newton; Leigh Julius; Snyman Prinsloo; Sherwin Vries	38.98 s	Canada (CAN); Charles Allen; Anson Henry; Nathan Taylor; Emanuel Parris	39.21 s
4 × 400 metre relay	Australia (AUS); John Steffensen; Chris Troode; Mark Ormrod; Clinton Hill	3:00.93 min	South Africa (RSA); Jan van der Merwe; Ofentse Mogawane; Paul Gorries; L. J. van Zyl	3:01.84 min	Jamaica (JAM); Lancford Davies; Davian Clarke; Lansford Spence; Jermaine Gonzales	3:01.94 min
Marathon	Samson Ramadhani Nyonyi; Tanzania	2:11:29 h	Fred Mogaka Tumbo; Kenya	2:12:03 h	Dan Robinson; England	2:14:50 h
20 km walk	Nathan Deakes; Australia	1:19:55 GR	Luke Adams; Australia	1:21:38	Jared Tallent; Australia	1:23:32
50 km walk	Nathan Deakes; Australia	3:42.53 GR	Tony Sargisson; New Zealand	3:58.05	Chris Erickson; Australia	3:58.22
High jump	Mark Boswell; Canada	2.26 m	Martyn Bernard; England	2.26 m	Kyriakos Ioannou; Cyprus	2.23 m
Pole vault	Steven Hooker; Australia	5.80 m GR	Dmitri Markov; Australia	5.60 m	Steven Lewis; England	5.50 m
Long jump	Ignisious Gaisah; Ghana	8.20 m	Gable Garenamotse; Botswana	8.17 m	Fabrice Lapierre; Australia	8.10 m
Triple jump	Phillips Idowu; England	17.45 m	Khotso Mokoena; South Africa	16.95 m	Alwyn Jones; Australia	16.75 m
Shot put	Janus Robberts; South Africa	19.76 m	Dorian Scott; Jamaica	19.75 m	Scott Martin; Australia	19.48 m
Discus throw	Scott Martin; Australia	63.48 m	Jason Tunks; Canada	63.07 m	Dariusz Slowik; Canada	61.49 m
Hammer throw	Stuart Rendell; Australia	77.53 m GR	James Steacy; Canada	74.75 m	Christiaan Harmse; South Africa	73.81 m
Javelin throw	Nicholas Nieland; England	80.10 m	William Hamlyn Harris; Australia	79.89 m	Oliver Dziubak; Australia	79.89 m
Decathlon	Dean Macey; England	8143	Maurice Smith; Jamaica	8074	Jason Dudley; Australia	8001

==== Men's disability events ====
Event	Gold		Silver		Bronze	
100 metres T12	Adekunle Adesoji; Nigeria	11.07 s	Hilton Langenhoven; South Africa	11.22 s	Eriyo Etinosa; Nigeria	11.43 s
200 metres T46	Heath Francis; Australia	22.96 s	David Roos; South Africa	23.12 s	Vitalis Lanshima; Nigeria	23.16 s
Discus throw (seated)	Tanto Campbell; Jamaica	34.48 m	Jacques Martin; Canada	32.28 m	Ranjith Kumar Jayaseelan; India	29.88 m

=== Women ===
Event	Gold		Silver		Bronze	
100 metres	Sheri-Ann Brooks; Jamaica	11.19 s	Geraldine Pillay; South Africa	11.31 s	Delphine Atangana; Cameroon	11.39 s
200 metres	Sherone Simpson; Jamaica	22.59 s	Veronica Campbell; Jamaica	22.72 s	Geraldine Pillay; South Africa	22.92 s
400 metres	Christine Ohuruogu; England	50.28 s	Tonique Williams-Darling; Bahamas	50.76 s	Novlene Williams; Jamaica	51.12 s
800 metres	Janeth Jepkosgei; Kenya	1:57.88 min	Kenia Sinclair; Jamaica	1:58.16 min	Maria de Lurdes Mutola; Mozambique	1:58.77 min
1500 metres	Lisa Dobriskey; England	4:06.21 min	Sarah Jamieson; Australia	4:06.64 min	Hayley Tullett; Wales	4:06.76 min
5000 metres	Isabella Ochichi; Kenya	14:57.84 min	Joanne Pavey; England	14:59.08 min	Lucy Wangui Kabuu; Kenya	15:00.20 min
10,000 metres	Lucy Kabuu; Kenya	31:29.66 min	Evelyne Wambui Nganga; Kenya	31:30.86 min	Mara Yamauchi; England	31:49.40 min
100 metre hurdles	Brigitte Foster-Hylton; Jamaica	12.75 s	Angela Whyte; Canada	12.94 s	Delloreen Ennis-London; Jamaica	13.00 s
400 metre hurdles	Jana Pittman; Australia	53.82 s GR	Natasha Danvers Smith; England	55.17 s	Lee McConnell; Scotland	55.25 s
3000 m steeplechase	Dorcus Inzikuru; Uganda	9:19.51 min GR	Melissa Rollison; Australia	9:24.29 min	Donna MacFarlane; Australia	9:25.05 min
4 × 100 metre relay	Jamaica (JAM); Daniele Browning; Sheri-Ann Brooks; Peta-Gaye Dowdie; Sherone Simpson	43.10 s	England (ENG); Anyika Onuora; Kimberly Wall; Laura Turner; Emma Ania	43.43 s	Australia (AUS); Sally McLellan; Melanie Kleeberg; Lauren Hewitt; Crystal Attenborough	44.25 s
4 × 400 metre relay	Australia (AUS); Jana Pittman; Caitlin Willis; Tamsyn Lewis; Rosemary Hayward	3:28.66 min	India (IND); Rajwinder Kaur; Chitra Soman; Manjeet Kaur; Pinki Pramanik	3:29.57 min	Nigeria (NGR); Kudirat Akhigbe; Joy Eze; Folashade Abugan; Christiana Epukhon	3:31.83 min
Marathon	Kerryn McCann; Australia	2:30:54	Helen Cherono Koskei; Kenya	2:30:56	Liz Yelling; England	2:32:19
20 km walk	Jane Saville; Australia	1:32:46 GR	Natalie Saville; Australia	1:33:33	Cheryl Webb; Australia	1:36:03
High jump	Anika Smith; South Africa	1.91 m	Julie Crane; Wales	1.88 m	Karen Beautle; Jamaica	1.83 m
High jump	Anika Smith; South Africa	1.91 m	Julie Crane; Wales	1.88 m	Angela McKee; New Zealand	1.83 m
Pole vault	Kym Howe; Australia	4.62 m GR	Tatiana Grigorieva; Australia	4.35 m	Stephanie McCann; Canada	4.25 m
Long jump	Bronwyn Thompson; Australia	6.97 m GR	Kerrie Taurima; Australia	6.57 m	Celine Laporte; Seychelles	6.57 m
Triple jump	Trecia Smith; Jamaica	14.39 m	Otonye Iworima; Nigeria	13.53 m	Nadia Williams; England	13.42 m
Shot put	Valerie Vili; New Zealand	19.66 m GR	Vivian Chukwuemeka; Nigeria	18.75 m	Cleopatra Borel-Brown; Trinidad and Tobago	17.54 m
Discus throw	Elizna Naude; South Africa	61.55 m	Seema Antil; India	60.56 m	Dani Samuels; Australia	59.44 m
Hammer throw	Brooke Krueger; Australia	67.90 m GR	Jennifer Joyce; Canada	67.29 m	Lorraine Shaw; England	66.00 m
Javelin throw	Sunette Viljoen; South Africa	60.72 m	Laverne Eve; Bahamas	60.54 m	Olivia McKoy; Jamaica	58.27 m
Heptathlon	Kelly Sotherton; England	6396	Kylie Wheeler; Australia	6298	Jessica Ennis; England	6269

==== Women's disability events ====
Event	Gold		Silver		Bronze	
100 metres T37	Elizabeth McIntosh; Australia	14.38 s	Katrina Webb; Australia	14.51 s	Beverley Jones; Wales	14.81 s
800 metres T54 (wheelchair)	Chantal Petitclerc; Canada	1:48.98	Eliza Stankovic; Australia	1:49.62	Diane Roy; Canada	1:53.76
Shot put (seated)	Njideka Iyiazi; Nigeria	6.78 m	Virginia Ohagwu; Nigeria	6.08 m	Asti Poole; Australia	5.33 m

== Medal table ==
* Host nation (Australia)

Rank	Nation	Gold	Silver	Bronze	Total
1	Australia (AUS)*	16	12	13	41
2	Jamaica (JAM)	10	4	8	22
3	Kenya (KEN)	6	5	4	15
4	England (ENG)	6	4	8	18
5	South Africa (SAF)	5	7	2	14
6	Canada (CAN)	2	7	4	13
7	Nigeria (NGR)	2	4	3	9
8	New Zealand (NZL)	2	1	1	4
9	Uganda (UGA)	2	0	0	2
10	Tanzania (TAN)	1	0	1	2
11	Ghana (GHA)	1	0	0	1
12	India (IND)	0	2	1	3
13	Bahamas (BAH)	0	2	0	2
14	Wales (WAL)	0	1	2	3
15	Scotland (SCO)	0	1	1	2
16	Botswana (BOT)	0	1	0	1
16	Grenada (GRN)	0	1	0	1
16	Mauritius (MRI)	0	1	0	1
19	Trinidad and Tobago (TTO)	0	0	2	2
20	Cameroon (CMR)	0	0	1	1
20	Cyprus (CYP)	0	0	1	1
20	Mozambique (MOZ)	0	0	1	1
20	Seychelles (SEY)	0	0	1	1
Totals (23 entries)		53	53	54	160

== Participating nations ==
- Anguilla (2)
- Antigua and Barbuda (8)
- Australia (103)
- Bahamas (16)
- Bangladesh (2)
- Belize (3)
- Bermuda (5)
- Botswana (10)
- British Virgin Islands (2)
- Cameroon (8)
- Canada (38)
- Cayman Islands (6)
- Cook Islands (1)
- Cyprus (9)
- Dominica (3)
- England (83)
- Fiji (10)
- Gambia (7)
- Ghana (12)
- Grenada (4)
- Guernsey (2)
- Guyana (3)
- Isle of Man (2)
- India (18)
- Jamaica (40)
- Jersey (2)
- Kenya (38)
- Kiribati (2)
- Lesotho (6)
- Malawi (4)
- Malaysia (6)
- Maldives (4)
- Mauritius (13)
- Montserrat (3)
- Mozambique (3)
- Namibia (2)
- New Zealand (25)
- Nigeria (30)
- Niue (1)
- Northern Ireland (7)
- Pakistan (6)
- Papua New Guinea (11)
- Saint Helena (1)
- Saint Kitts and Nevis (2)
- Saint Lucia (6)
- Saint Vincent and the Grenadines (4)
- Samoa (4)
- Scotland (18)
- Seychelles (3)
- Sierra Leone (14)
- Singapore (2)
- Solomon Islands (4)
- Sri Lanka (7)
- South Africa (50)
- Swaziland (2)
- Tanzania (13)
- Tonga (3)
- Trinidad and Tobago (16)
- Turks and Caicos Islands (5)
- Uganda (8)
- Wales (19)
- Vanuatu (4)
- Zambia (3)
