= Jan van der Merwe (athlete) =

South African sprinter

Jan van der Merwe (born 16 March 1983) is a South African sprinter.
