= Alex Kipchirchir =

Kenyan middle-distance runner

Medal record

Men's athletics

Representing Kenya

African Championships
Gold medal – first place	2006 Bambous	800 m
Gold medal – first place	2006 Bambous	1500 m

Alex Kipchirchir Rono (born 26 November 1984 in Sergoit) is a Kenyan middle distance runner.

== Career ==
He graduated from Litein High School. He played football and basketball when still at school and did not take up athletics until December 2001, when he met Moses Tanui who persuaded him to become runner. Only seven months later he became World Junior Champion, in his first race outside Kenya. Before becoming a full-time athlete, he served as a waiter at his uncle's food cafe in Chepkanga, Uasing Gishu District.

In 2002, Kipchirchir won the 800 metres at the World Junior Championships in Kingston, Jamaica. In 2003 set a new one mile Junior World Record of 3:50.25 in Rieti, Italy. The record was broken by William Biwott Tanui in 2009. Kipchirchir finished fourth in Kenyan trials for 2003 World Championships 2004 Olympics, missing both events narrowly. On the other hand, both year he finished second at the IAAF World Athletics Final. He represented Kenya at the 2005 World Championships in Helsinki, Finland where he finished seventh in the 1500 metres final.

His breakthrough year was 2006, in which he won several titles. On 23 March, he won the men's 800 metres event at the 2006 Commonwealth Games with a time of 1 minute, 45.88 seconds. On 26 April, he was part of the world record squad in the distance medley relay, running a 3:52.8 final (1600m) leg. In August, he completed an 800 and 1500 metres double at the 2006 African Championships in Athletics in Bambous, Mauritius.

Kipchirchir was awarded the 2006 Kenyan Sportsman of the Year award.

After 2006 he has been unable to match his earlier performances. In May 2010 he returned to competition after a nearly two-year break caused by a hamstring injury.

He is managed by Federico Rosa and coached by David Leting and John Cook.
