= Onalenna Baloyi =

Botswana middle distance runner

Personal information
- Full name: Onalenna Oabona Baloyi
- Nationality: Botswana
- Born: 6 May 1984 (age 42) Mahalapye, Botswana
- Height: 1.80 m (5 ft 11 in)
- Weight: 62 kg (137 lb)

Sport
- Sport: Athletics
- Event: Middle distance running

Achievements and titles
- Personal best: 800 m: 1:46.06 (2005)

Onalenna Oabona Baloyi (born May 6, 1984 in Mahalapye) is a Botswana middle distance runner, who specialized in the 800 metres.

== Career ==
Baloyi's first major international event was at the 2005 World Championships in Athletics held in Helsinki, Finland, he ran in the 800 metres and he finished 7th in his heat from eight starters so he didn't advance to the next round. A year later he competed at the 2006 Commonwealth Games held in Melbourne, Australia, he again entered the 800 metres and this time he finished third in his heat which was fast enough to qualify for the final, in the final he ran 10 seconds slower than his heat and finished eighth. Baloyi represented Botswana at the 2008 Summer Olympics in Beijing, where he competed for the men's 800 metres. He ran in the second heat against six other athletes, including Sudan's Abubaker Kaki, who emerged himself as a heavy favorite and a possible top medal contender in this event. He finished the race in fourth place by four tenths of a second (0.40) behind Russia's Dmitriy Bogdanov, with a time of 1:47.89. Baloyi, however, failed to advance into the semi-finals, as he placed thirty-eighth overall, and was ranked below two mandatory slots for the next round.

== Doping ==
In 2010 Baloyi was given a two-year suspension by the IAAF for use of performance-enhancing substances, while training in Germany he went to a pharmacist for his usual energy drink but they had sold out and was given a replacement which contained banned substances. After five years in the wilderness Baloyi was invited by the Botswana National Olympic Committee to sit on the panel of the anti-doping workshops and is still hoping to make a return to athletics.
