= Dominica at the 2002 Commonwealth Games =

Sporting event delegation

Flag of Dominica

Dominica competed for the sixth time at the 2002 Commonwealth Games in Manchester. Six male athletes were sent to the games, but no females, competing in athletics, squash and table tennis They did not win any medals.

	Gold	Silver	Bronze	Total
Dominica	0	0	0	0
