= Henry Wynne (runner) =

American middle-distance runner (born 1995)

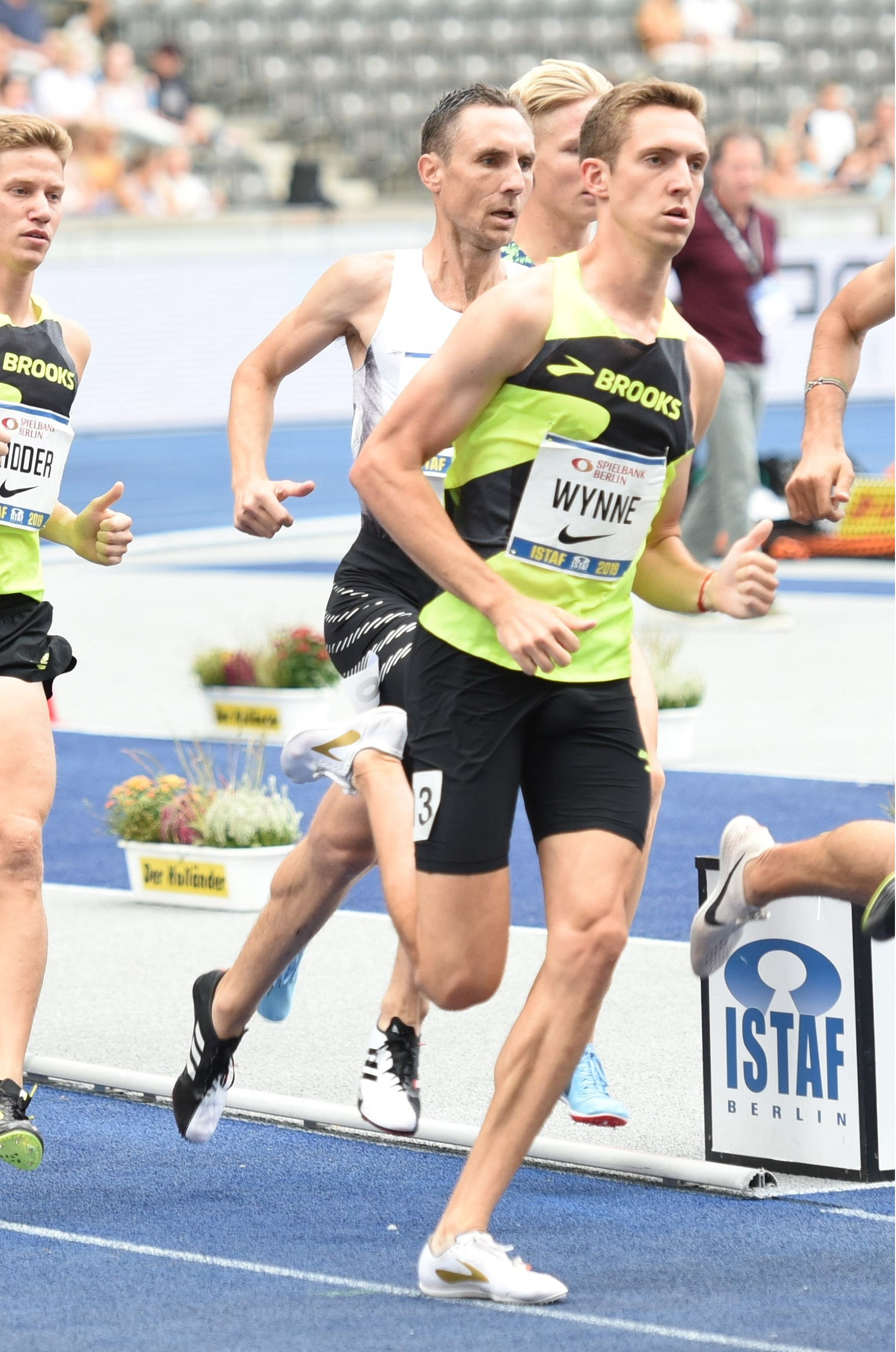
- Wynne at the 2019 ISTAF Berlin

Personal information
- Born: April 18, 1995 (age 31) Westport, Connecticut, U.S.
- Education: University of Virginia
- Employer: Brooks

Sport
- Sport: Track and field
- Events: 1500 m, Mile
- University team: Virginia Cavaliers
- Club: Brooks Beasts
- Coached by: Danny Mackey

Achievements and titles
- Personal bests: 1500 m: 3:32.94 (Eugene 2024); Mile: 3:51.26 (Boston 2019)
Medal record
Men's track and field
Representing United States
NACAC U23 Championships
Gold medal – first place	2016 San Salvador	1500 m

Henry Wynne (born 18 April 1995) is an American middle-distance runner who specializes in the 1500 m and mile. Competing for the University of Virginia, he was the 2016 NCAA indoor mile champion.

After graduating from Virginia in 2017, he joined the Brooks Beasts Track Club and has since set personal bests of 3:32.94 in the 1500 m and 3:51.26 in the mile. He is a two time US Indoor Championship runner-up and in April 2024, was part of a Brooks Beasts quartet that set the world record in the DMR.

== Athletics career ==
=== High School ===
In 2013, during his senior year at Staples High School in Westport, Connecticut, Wynne won national titles in the mile indoors and out at New Balance Nationals Indoor and New Balance Nationals Outdoor. He graduated from high school with personal bests of 1:49.93 in the 800 m, 4:05.04 in the mile, and 9:04.34 in the 3200 m and with a total of 22 Connecticut state titles and 5 New England titles.

=== University of Virginia ===
In fall of 2013, Wynne enrolled at the University of Virginia, joining the Virginia Cavaliers cross country and track and field teams. After redshirting his freshman cross country season, Wynne made his Virginia debut during the 2014 indoor season where he would run a personal best of 4:04.37 in the mile and go on to place eighth at the ACC Indoor Championships in the same event. Outdoors, he ran 3:46.48 over 1500 m and finishing his freshman season placing eighth at the USA Junior Championships in Eugene, Oregon.

In 2015, Wynne placed fifth at the ACC Indoor Championships in the mile and finished sixth as part of Virginia's DMR at the NCAA Indoor Championships. In June, he qualified for the NCAA Outdoor Championships in the 1500 m, but failed to advance to the final.

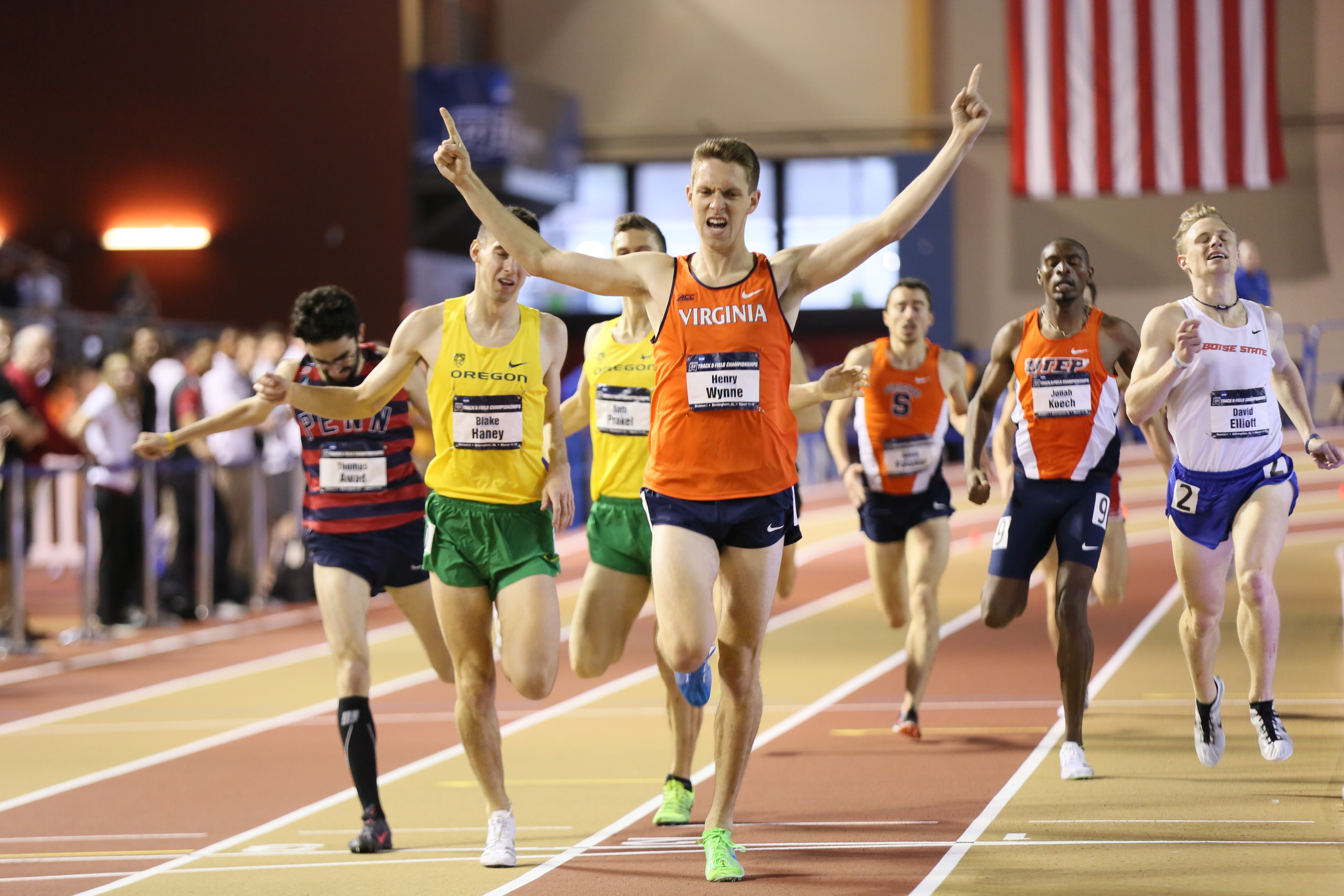
Wynne winning the mile at the 2016 NCAA Indoor Track and Field Championships.

During the 2016 indoor season, he broke four minutes in the mile for the first time, running 3:58.74 at the John Thomas Terrier Invitational in Boston. In February, ACC titles in the mile and DMR, and on March 12, competing at the NCAA Indoor Championships in Birmingham, Alabama, he took first place in the mile in 4:06.63.

After setting a 3:38.05 personal best in April and taking the ACC 1500 m title in May, Wynne placed third at the 2016 NCAA Outdoor Championships, finishing behind Clayton Murphy and Izaic Yorks. Later that summer, he represented the United States at the NACAC U23 Championships, winning gold in the 1500 m.

After missing the 2016 fall cross country season due to a knee injury, Wynne placed second in mile at the 2017 ACC Indoor Championships in February and placed fifth at the ACC Outdoor Championships in the 1500 m. However, his high hopes of a strong showing at his final NCAA Outdoor Championships were squashed after a bout of pneumonia just before the East Regional Qualifier, causing him to place just eleventh in his heat, dashing his hopes of qualifying for a final NCAAs.

Wynne competed at the 2017 USA Championships in Sacramento, California, placing 33rd overall.

=== Brooks Beasts ===
Following his 2017 season and the conclusion of his collegiate career, Wynne signed professionally with Brooks, joining the Brooks Beasts Track Club under coach Danny Mackey. Just two days before he signed the contract, he underwent knee surgery, something him and Mackey had hidden from Brooks during contract negotiations, causing the Brooks sports marketing department to be "very unhappy" when they learned of it.

Coming off his operation, he struggled through the 2018 season, but managed personal bests of 3:55.23 in the mile and 13:30.43 over 5000 m.

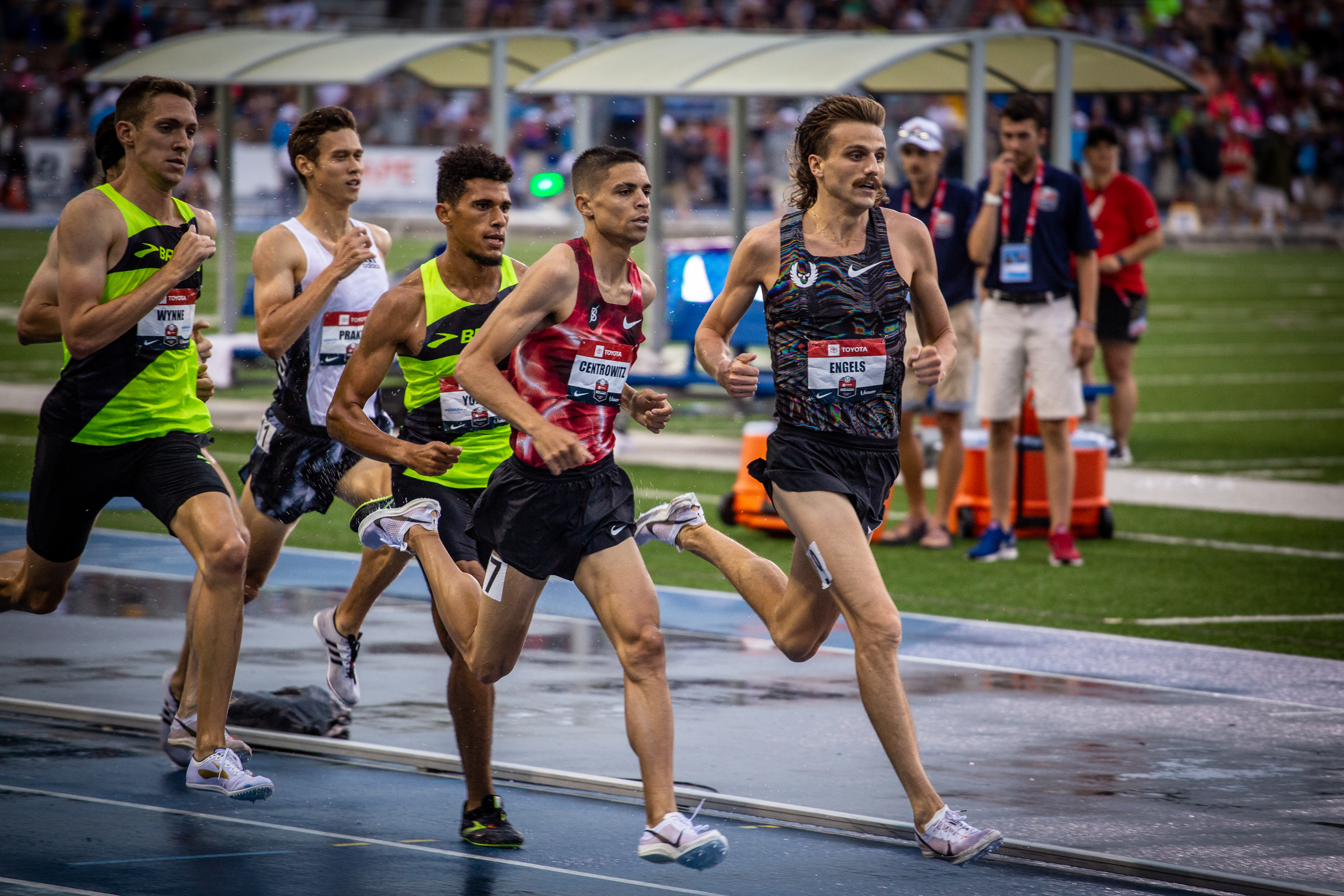
Wynne (furthest left) competing at the 2019 USA Outdoor Track and Field Championships

In early 2019, Wynne finished second at the USA Indoor Championships and ran a mile personal best of 3:51.26, placing him sixth on the all-time US list at the time. Later that year, he ran a 3:35.14 1500 m PB in Seattle and finished eighth in the at the USA Outdoor Championships.

In May 2021, he ran a 1500 m personal best of 3:34.08 to take fourth at the Portland Track Festival. The following month, at the 2020 US Olympic Trials (held in 2021), Wynne placed fifth in 3:37.70.

In 2022, Wynne placed third over 1500 m at the USA Indoor Championships and qualified for the 1500 m final at the USA Outdoor Championships, placing twelfth in 3:48.03.

At the Boston University Last Chance Indoor Qualifier in February 2023, Wynne ran his fasted mile since 2019, clocking a time of 3:52.51 to take the win. At the 2023 USA Outdoor Championships in July, Wynne placed fifth in 3:35.99 and, in August, ran a 1500 seasons best of 3:34.67 to take the win at the Ed Murphy Classic in Memphis.

On April 19, 2024, at the Oregon Relays, Wynne, alongside Brooks Beasts teammates Brandon Kidder, Brandon Miller, and Isaiah Harris, set a world record in the distance medley relay. After a 2:49.60 1200 m leg by Kidder, a 46.60 400 leg by Miller, and a 1:45.75 800 m split from Harris, Wynne anchoring the quartet running the 1600 m leg, needed a split in the low 3:50s to secure the record. Running completely solo, he ran a split of 3:52.63, breaking the previous record of 9:15:50 set by Kyle Merber, Brycen Spratling, Brandon Johnson, and Ben Blankenship at the 2015 IAAF World Relays, by 0.92 seconds with a time of 9:14.58.

== Championship results ==
=== International competitions ===
Representing the United States
Year	Competition	Venue	Position	Event	Time
2016	NACAC U23 Championships	San Salvador, El Salvador	1st	1500 m	3:51.81

=== USA Championships ===
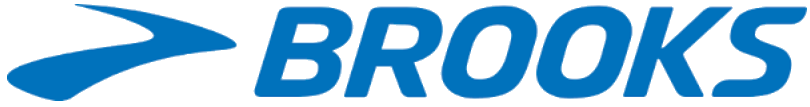
Representing the Brooks Beasts
Year	Competition	Venue	Position	Event	Time
2017	USA Championships	Sacramento, California	33rd	1500 m	3:48.35
2018	USA Indoor Championships	Albuquerque, New Mexico	5th	1500 m	3:43.71
2019	USA Indoor Championships	New York City	2nd	Mile	4:00.20
2019	USA Championships	Des Moines, Iowa	8th	1500 m	3:46.16
2021	US Olympic Trials	Eugene, Oregon	5th	1500 m	3:37.70
2022	USA Indoor Championships	Spokane, Washington	3rd	1500 m	3:39.60
2022	USA Championships	Eugene, Oregon	12th	1500 m	3:48.03
2023	USA Indoor Championships	Albuquerque, New Mexico	2nd	1500 m	3:42.90
2023	USA Championships	Eugene, Oregon	5th	1500 m	3:35.99
2024	USA Indoor Championships	Albuquerque, New Mexico	3rd	1500 m	3:38.81
2024	US Olympic Trials	Eugene, Oregon	6th	1500 m	3:32.94

=== NCAA Championships ===
Representing the Virginia Cavaliers
Year	Venue	Position	Event	Time
NCAA Cross Country Championships
2015	Louisville, Kentucky	59th	10 km	30:40.3
NCAA Indoor Track and Field Championships
2015	Fayetteville, Arkansas	6th	DMR	9:33.24
2016	Birmingham, Alabama	1st	Mile	4:06.63
NCAA Outdoor Track and Field Championships
2015	Eugene, Oregon	22nd (h)	1500 m	3:50.91
2016	Eugene, Oregon	3rd	1500 m	3:38.35
