= 4 × mile relay =

Athletics event

The 4 × mile relay is an athletics track event in which teams comprise four runners who each complete one mile (1,609.344 metres) or slightly more than 4 laps on a standard 400 metre track.

The event is not often run as most legacy 440 yard tracks have been converted to 400 metres, thus making 4 × 1500 or 4 × 1600 metres easier to manage. However, the Penn Relays still includes an annual "Championship of America" 4 × mile event for men.

The World Athletics governing body does not recognise a World Record in this event. The World Best for men in the event is a time of 15:49.08 by an Irish team of Eamonn Coghlan, Marcus O'Sullivan, Frank O'Mara and Ray Flynn in 1985, representing an average of 3:57.3 per mile for each runner.

== All-time top 23 ==
=== Men ===
- Updated April 2024.

Rank	Time	Team	Athletes	Date	Place	Ref.
1	15:49.08	Ireland	Eamonn Coghlan (Republic of Ireland) , Marcus O'Sullivan (Republic of Ireland) , Frank O'Mara (Republic of Ireland) , Ray Flynn (Republic of Ireland)	17 August 1985	Dublin	
2	15:51.91	Villanova University	Sean Donoghue (Republic of Ireland) (3:59.32); Charlie O' Donovan (Republic of Ireland) (4:00.09); Marco Langon (United States) (3:58.18); Liam Murphy (United States) (3:54.32)	27 April 2024	Philadelphia	
3	15:52.05	Duck Track Club	Matt Wisner (United States) , James West (United Kingdom) , Cole Hocker (United States) , Cooper Teare (United States)	23 April 2022	Eugene	
4	15:52.30	University of Virginia	Wes Porter (United States) (3:59.17); Will Anthony (New Zealand) (4:00.95); Yasin Sado (United States) (3:56.97); Gary Martin (United States) (3:55.22)	27 April 2024	Philadelphia	
5	15:52.56	Georgetown University	Lucas Guerra (United States) (3:59.61); Parker Stokes (United States) (3:59.89); Camden Gilmore (United States) (3:58.82); Abel Teffra (United States) (3:54.26)	27 April 2024	Philadelphia	
6	15:59.57	New Zealand	Tony Rogers (New Zealand) , John Bowden (New Zealand) , Michael Gilchrist (New Zealand) , John Walker (New Zealand)	2 March 1983	Auckland	
7	16:02.4	New Zealand	Kevin Ross (New Zealand) , Tony Polhill (New Zealand) , Dick Tayler (New Zealand) , Dick Quax (New Zealand)	3 February 1972	Auckland	
8	16:03.24	University of Oregon	Matt Centrowitz (United States) , Andrew Wheating (United States) , Shadrack Biwott (Kenya) , Galen Rupp (United States)	9 May 2009	Eugene	
9	16:03.68i	Brooks Beasts	David Ribich (United States) , Henry Wynne (United States) , Brannon Kidder (United States) , Izaic Yorks (United States)	26 January 2019	New York City	
10	16:04.54	University of Michigan	Andrew Ellerton (Canada) , Mike Woods (Canada) , Nick Willis (New Zealand) , Nathan Brannen (Canada)	30 April 2005	Philadelphia	
11	16:04.69	On Athletics Club	Ben Flanagan (Canada) , Tom Elmer (Switzerland) , Joe Klecker (United States) , Oliver Hoare (Australia)	29 April 2022	Philadelphia	
12	16:05.0	Oregon Track Club	Roscoe Divine (United States) , Wade Bell (United States) , Arne Kvalheim (Norway) , David Wilborn (United States)	30 May 1968	Eugene	
13	16:07.39	Iona University	Nick Soldevere (3:59.78); Aiden Coles (4:05.36); Bradley Giblin (3:58.35); Damien Dilcher (4:03.91)	27 April 2024	Philadelphia	
14	16:07.83	Ex-Duck All-Stars	Matthew Centrowitz (United States) (4:04.34), Charlie Hunter (Australia) (4:00.58), Sam Prakel (United States) (3:59.46), Johnny Gregorek (United States) (4:03.45)	21 April 2023	Eugene	
15	16:07.96	University of Arkansas	Sharif Karie (Somalia) , Michael Power (Australia) , Matthew Kerr (Canada) , Seneca Lassiter (United States)	24 April 1999	Philadelphia	
16	16:08.54	Athletics West	Dan Aldridge (United States) , Doug Padilla (United States) , Tom Smith (United States) , Chuck Aragon (United States)	4 May 1984	Eugene	
17	16:08.65	University of Notre Dame	Carter Solomon (3:59.06); CJ Singleton (4:02.17); Jake Renfree (4:05.01); Daelen Ackley (4:02.42)	27 April 2024	Philadelphia	
18	16:08.81	University of Arkansas	Murray Link (Canada) , Sharif Karie (Somalia) , Ryan Travis (United States) , James Karanu (Kenya)	29 April 2000	Philadelphia	
19	16:08.9	University of Oregon	Archie San Romani (United States) , Vic Reeve (Canada) , Keith Forman (United States) , Dyrol Burleson (United States)	12 May 1962	Fresno	
20	16:09.6	Federal Republic of Germany	Walter Adams (West Germany) , Bodo Tümmler (West Germany) , Harald Norpoth (West Germany) , Jürgen May (West Germany)	24 June 1969	West Berlin	
21	16:09.67	University of Oregon	Sam Prakel (United States) , Edward Cheserek (Kenya) , Eric Jenkins (United States) , Mac Fleet (United States)	26 April 2014	Philadelphia	
22	16:09.84	University of Arkansas	Michael Taylor (United States) , Daniel Lincoln (United States) , Chris Mulvaney (United Kingdom) , Alistair Cragg (South Africa)	27 April 2002	Philadelphia	
23	16:10.6	Villanova University	Tom Gregan (Republic of Ireland) , Brian McElroy (United States) , Eamonn Coghlan (Republic of Ireland) , John Hartnett (Republic of Ireland)	27 April 2002	Philadelphia	

=== Women ===
- Updated May 2023.

Rank	Time	Team	Athletes	Date	Place	Ref.
1	18:39.58	University of Oregon	Brenda Bushnell (United States) , Leann Warren (United States) , Kathy Hayes (United States) , Claudette Groenendaal (United States)	5 May 1985	Eugene	
2	19:00.46	Athletics West	Cathie Twomey (United States) , Mary Rapp (United States) , Lee Arbogast (United States) , Jill Jones (United States)	5 May 1985	Eugene	
3	19:17.3	British Milers Club	Jackie Hansford (United Kingdom) , Wendy Williams (United Kingdom) , Paula Gowing (United Kingdom) , Stella Harrod (United Kingdom)	10 July 1993	Oxford	
4	19:25.91	Stanford University	Lindsay Hyatt (United States) , Katie Hotchkiss (United States) , Alicia Craig (United States) , Sara Bei (United States)	24 April 2003	Des Moines	
5	19:37.78i	Flower Mound High School	Nicole Humphries (United States) , Samantha Humphries (United States) , Alexandra Fox (United States) , Natalie Cook (United States)	12 March 2022	New York City	
6	19:40.67	Saratoga Springs High School	Emily Bush (United States) , Ella Kurto (United States) , Alycia Hart (United States) , Mackenzie Hart (United States)	2 July 2021	Oregon	
7	19:45.37	Niwot High School	Lucca Fulkerson (United States) , Mia Prok (United States) , Stella Vieth (United States) , Madison Shults (United States)	2 July 2021	Oregon	
8	19:48.13	Niwot High School	Bella Nelson (United States) , Eva Klingbeil (United States) , Mia Prok (United States) , Madison Shults (United States)	19 June 2022	Oregon	
9	19:48.84	Clemson University	Cindy Duarte (United States) , Kerry Robinson (United States) , Judith Shepherd (United Kingdom) , Stephanie Weikert (United States)	13 March 1982	Tallahassee	
10	19:49.10i	Saratoga Springs High School	Ella Kurto (United States) , Alycia Hart (United States) , McKenzie Hart (United States) , Emily Bush (United States)	11 March 2022	New York City	
11	19:50.34i	Flower Mound High School	Alexandra Fox (United States) , Nicole Humphries (United States) , Abbey Coberly (United States) , Samantha Humphries (United States)	11 March 2023	Boston	
12	19:52.57	University of Kentucky		25 March 1989	Stanford	
13	19:52.82	Colorado State University	Marget Larson (United States) , Mary Ridder (United States) , Anya Sawyer (United States) , Katie Yemm (United States)	24 April 2003	Des Moines	
14	19:53.42	University of Kansas	Angela Pichardo (United States) , Jenna Bimbi (United States) , Megan Manthe (United States) , Laura Lavoie (United States)	24 April 2003	Des Moines	
15	19:54.6	USC	Shannon Clark (United States) , Julie Seleine (United States) , Elise Lyon (United Kingdom) , Lesley Noll (United States)	28 March 1987	Stanford	
16	19:55.21i	Carolina Cavaliers		11 March 2023	Boston	
17	19:56.80	Suffern High School	Christy Goldman (United States) , Shelby Greany (United States) , Caroline Heidt (United States) , Kara McKenna (United States)	4 June 2006	New Rochelle	
18	19:56.92	Texas Tech	Brionne Yosten (United States) , Bridget Tidwell (United States) , Stefanie Calhoun (United States) , Tracie Akerhielm (United States)	24 April 2003	Des Moines	
