= Distance medley relay =

Athletic event in which four athletes compete as part of a relay

Athletics Distance Medley Relay
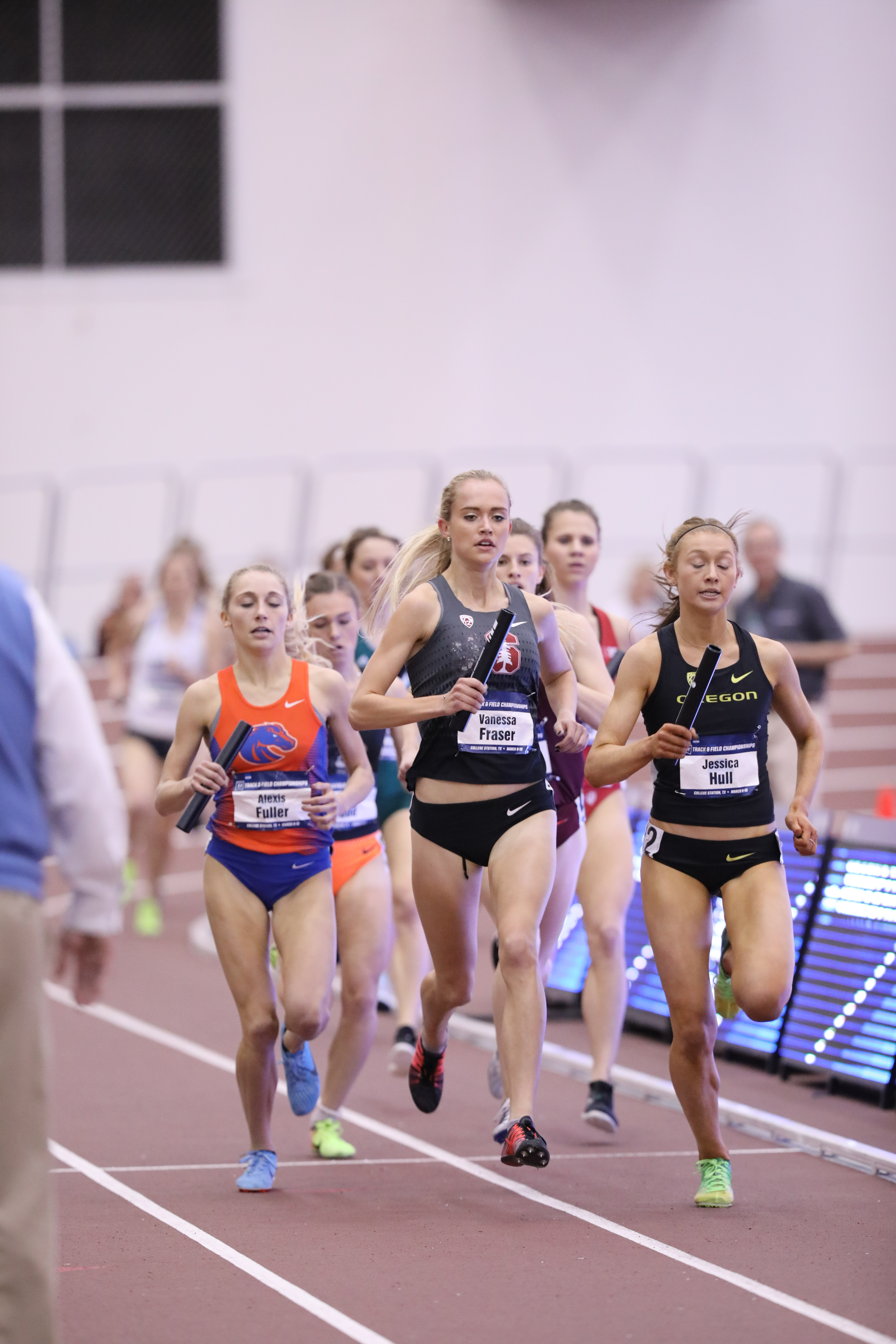
- Athletes competing in the DMR at the 2018 NCAA Indoor Track and Field Championships

World records
- Men: (United States) Brooks Beasts (Brannon Kidder, Brandon Miller, Isaiah Harris, Henry Wynne 9:14.58 (2024)
- Women: (United States) New Balance (Emma Coburn, Kendall Ellis, Roisin Willis, Elle Purrier St. Pierre 10:33.85 (2022)

The distance medley relay (DMR) is an athletic event in which four athletes compete as part of a relay. With its inclusion in the IAAF World Relays program, the IAAF announced on May 1, 2015 that the event would be an official world record event.

Unlike most track relays, each member of the team runs a different distance. A distance medley relay is made up of a 1200-meter leg (three laps on a standard 400 meter track), a 400-meter leg (one lap), an 800-meter leg (two laps), and a 1600-meter leg (four laps) in that order. The total distance run is 4000 meters, or nearly 2.5 miles. Aside from the 400 meter segment, which is a sprint, all legs are a middle distance run. Prior to going metric, the distance medley relay consisted of a 440-yard leg, an 880-yard leg, a 1320-yard leg and a one-mile leg. The total distance for the old distance medley relay was 4400 yards and the total distance for the current metric distance medley relay is 4374.45 yards - slightly over 25 yards shorter than the old race. There is also a rare Short Distance Medley Relay variation that runs a 400, 400, 800, 1600 configuration, including at the Drake Relays.

== World record ==
=== Men ===
The United States is expected to hold the world record in the men's DMR, assuming formal ratification of a performance of 9:14.58, set on April 19, 2024 during the Oregon Relays at Hayward Field, Eugene, Oregon. The team consisted of Brannon Kidder 2:49.60 (1200 m), Brandon Miller 46.60 (400 m), Isaiah Harris 1:45.75 (800 m) and Henry Wynne 3:52.64 (1600 m).

After the IAAF announcement of world record status, the first mark to become the ratified world record was set by a Kenyan team in 9:15.56. Elkanah Angwenyi in 2:50.8 (1,200 meters), Thomas Musembi in 45.8 (400), Alfred Yego in 1:46.2 (800) and Alex Kipchirchir in 3:52.8 (1,600) recorded it on April 29, 2006, at the Penn Relays in Philadelphia, Pennsylvania.

The Oklahoma State Track and Field team of Fouad Messaoudi in 2:49.49 (1,200 meters), DJ McArthur in 46.82 (400), Hafez Mahadi in 1:47.27 (800), and Ryan Schoppe in 3:52.84 (1,600) currently hold the indoor world best in a time of 9:16.40. The mark was set on February 17, 2023 at the Arkansas Qualifier in Fayetteville, Arkansas.

=== Women ===
At the 2015 IAAF World Relays, the women's world record was set by the American team of Treniere Moser 3:18.38 (1200 m), Sanya Richards-Ross (50.12) (400 m), Ajee' Wilson 2:00.08 (800 m), and Shannon Rowbury 4:27.92 (1600 m) running 10:36.50. They beat the outdoor record of 10:48.38 set by a team from Villanova University of Kathy Franey (1200 m), Michelle Bennett (400 m), Celeste Halliday (800 m), and Vicki Huber (1600 m) at the Penn Relays in April 1988 in Philadelphia, Pennsylvania, 27 years earlier.

The United States women's team of Sarah Brown, Mahagony Jones, Megan Krumpoch, and Brenda Martinez set the first indoor world record for the event with a time of 10:42.57 at New Balance Indoor Grand Prix in 2015. At the time of the IAAF announcement, this time, superior to the best time outdoors, became the ratified world record even though it was set on an indoor banked track.

On April 15, 2022 an American team consisting of Heather MacLean, Kendall Ellis, Roisin Willis and Elle Purrier St. Pierre set the current best indoor time of 10:33.85 at The TRACK in Boston. Nevertheless the distance medley relay is only a world record discipline outdoors it is a subject to usual ratification procedure to become an outright world record because their time bettered the outdoor mark of 10:36.50.

== All-time top 25 ==
=== Men ===
- Updated April 2025.

Rank	Time	Team	Athletes	Date	Place	Ref.
1	9:14.10 i OT	University of Washington	Ronan McMahon-Staggs, Ambodai Ligons, Kyle Reinheimer, Nathan Green	14 February 2025	Seattle	
2	9:14.58	(United States) Brooks Beasts	Brannon Kidder (2:49.60), Brandon Miller (46.60), Isaiah Harris (1:45.75), Henry Wynne (3:52.64)	19 April 2024	Eugene	
3	9:15.12 i	Virginia Cavaliers		14 March 2025	Virginia Beach	
4	9:15.50	United States	Kyle Merber, Brycen Spratling, Brandon Johnson, Ben Blankenship	3 May 2015	Nassau	
5	9:15.56	Kenya	Elkanah Angwenyi (2:50.8), Thomas Musembi (45.8), Alfred Yego (1:46.2), Alex Kipchirchir (3:52.8)	29 April 2006	Philadelphia	
6	9:15.63	United States	Chris Lukezic (2:51.7), James Carter (45.6), Khadevis Robinson (1:44.5), Bernard Lagat (3:53.8)	29 April 2006	Philadelphia	
7	9:16.34	Ethiopia	Abiyote Abinet (2:53.5), Bereket Desta (46.0), Mohammed Aman (1:44.0), Aman Wote (3:52.8)	27 April 2013	Philadelphia	
8	9:16.40 i	Oklahoma State University	(Morocco) Fouad Messaoudi (2:49.49), (United States) DeJuana McArthur (46.82), (Qatar) Hafez Mahadi (1:47.27), (United States) Ryan Schoppe (3:52.84)	17 February 2023	Fayetteville	
9	9:16.65 i	University of Washington	(United States) Joe Waskom (2:49.41), (United States) Daniel Gaik (46.37), (United States) Cass Elliott (1:47.42), (Canada) Kieran Lumb (3:53.46)	17 February 2023	Fayetteville	
10	9:17.01	Kenya	Anthony Chemut (2:51.6), Kennedy Chepsiror (47.1), Timothy Kitum (1:45.4), Caleb Ndiku (3:52.9)	27 April 2013	Philadelphia	
11	9:17.17 i	Wake Forest	(Germany) Paul Specht, (United States) Foster Shelbert, (South Africa) Rynard Swaepoel, (United States) Rocky Hansen	21 February 2025	Boston	
11	9:17.17 i	North Carolina Tar Heels		14 March 2025	Virginia Beach	
13	9:17.19 i	(United States) North Carolina Tar Heels	Aiden Neal, Nickolis Anderson, Andrew Regnier, Ethan Strand	21 February 2025	Boston	
14	9:17.20	Kenya	Abednego Chesebe Miti, Alphas Leken Kishoyian, Ferguson Cheruiyot Rotich, Timothy Cheruiyot	3 May 2015	Nassau	
15	9:17.30 i	(United States) Princeton Tigers	Connor McCormick, Xavier Donaldson, Samuel Rodman, Harrison Witt	21 February 2025	Boston	
16	9:17.34 i OT	Northern Arizona University	(United States) Colin Sahlman, (United States) Trenton Givens, (New Zealand) Theo Quax, (United States) Nico Young (3:52.03)	2 February 2024	South Bend	
17	9:17.48	Morocco	Mohammed Moustaoui (2:48.54), Marouan Maadadi (46.36), Mohammed Laalou (1:49.50), Amine Laalou (3:53.08)	30 April 2011	Philadelphia	
18	9:17.56	Australia	Ryan Gregson (2:48.66), Sean Wroe (45.95), Lachlan Renshaw (1:46.29), Jeff Riseley (3:56.66)	30 April 2011	Philadelphia	
19	9:17.57 i	Oregon Ducks		14 March 2025	Virginia Beach	
20	9:17.74 i	Texas A&M Aggies		14 March 2025	Virginia Beach	
21	9:17.92 i OT	(United States) University of North Carolina	Ethan Strand, Andrew Regnier, Kyle Reinheimer, Parker Wolfe (3:52.70)	2 February 2024	South Bend	
22	9:18.09	United States	Bernard Lagat (2:48.29), Michael Tinsley (46.13), Duane Solomon (1:46.31), Russell Brown (3:57.36)	30 April 2011	Philadelphia	
23	9:18.21	(United States) USA Red	Andrew Wheating (2:52.2), Quentin Summers (44.8), Duane Solomon (1:45.0), David Torrence (3:56.2)	27 April 2013	Philadelphia	
24	9:18.31 i	BYU Cougars		14 March 2025	Virginia Beach	
25	9:18.81 i	(United States) University of Washington	Joe Waskom (2:51.34), Daniel Gaik (46.37), Nathan Green (1:46.57), Luke Houser (3:54.54)	16 February 2024	Fayetteville	

=== Women ===
- Updated April 2026.

Rank	Time	Team	Athletes	Date	Place	Ref.
1	10:33.85i	New Balance	Heather MacLean (3:14.92), Kendall Ellis (52.04), Roisin Willis (2:03.30), Elle Purrier St. Pierre (4:23.55)	15 April 2022	Boston	
2	10:36.50	United States	Treniere Moser, Sanya Richards-Ross, Ajeé Wilson, Shannon Rowbury	2 May 2015	Nassau	
3	10:36.82	University of North Carolina	Sydney Masciarelli (3:16.35), Delea Martins (53.91), Makayla Paige (2:00.43), (Sweden) Vera Sjöberg (4:26.15)	24 April 2026	Philadelphia	
4	10:36.90	Stanford University	Juliette Whittaker8 (3:12.81), Alyssa Jones (52.54), Amelia Everett (2:04.91), Mena Scatchard (4:26.65)	24 April 2026	Philadelphia	
5	10:37.55	Harvard University	Sophia Gorriaran (3:20.36), Chloe Fair (53.20), Victoria Bossong (2:02.54), (New Zealand) Maia Ramsden (4:21.47)	26 April 2024	Philadelphia	
6	10:37.58 i OT	Brigham Young University	Carmen Alder, Meghan Hunter, Tessa Buswell, Riley Chamberlain	14 February 2025	Seattle	
7	10:38.93 i OT	Stanford University	Juliette Whittaker, Cate Peters, Roisin Willis, Amy Bunnage	14 February 2025	Seattle	
8	10:39.04	Providence College	Shannon Flockhart (3:15.11), Jillian Fenerty (55.05), Alex O'Neill (2:05.21), (New Zealand) Kimberley May (4:23.68)	26 April 2024	Philadelphia	
9	10:39.44 i OT	Northern Arizona University	Agnès McTighe, Kyairra Reigh, Alexandra Carlson, Maggi Congdon	14 February 2025	Seattle	
10	10:39.91i	Nike Union Athletic Club	Ella Donaghu, Raevyn Rogers, Sinclaire Johnson, Shannon Osika	11 February 2022	Spokane	
11	10:40.31i	United States	Emma Coburn, Sydney McLaughlin, Brenda Martinez, Jenny Simpson	28 January 2017	Boston	
12	10:40.44 i OT	University of Washington	Chloe Foerster, Anna Terrell, Claire Yerby, Amina Maatoug	14 February 2025	Seattle	
13	10:41.85i	Brigham Young University	Riley Chamberlain, Sami Oblad, Tessa Buswell, Jane Hedengren	10 December 2025	Provo	
14	10:42.05i	Oregon Ducks	(Sweden) Julia Nielsen, (United States) Moriah Oliveira, (United States) Mia Barnett, (Turkey) Şilan Ayyildiz	21 February 2025	Boston	
15	10:42.56 i OT	University of Utah	Brianna Rinn, Emily Martin, Kyla Martin, Erin Vringer	14 February 2025	Seattle	
16	10:42.57i	New Balance	Sarah Brown, Mahogany Jones, Megan Krumpoch, Brenda Martinez	7 February 2015	Boston	
17	10:42.79i	New York All-Stars	Stephanie Charnigo, Katie Hoaldridge, Latavia Thomas, Nicole Tully	7 February 2015	Boston	
18	10:43.35	Kenya	Selah Jepleting Busienei, Joy Nakhumicha Sakari, Sylivia Chematui Chesebe, Virginia Nyambura Nganga	2 May 2015	Nassau	
19	10:43.39i	University of Washington	Chloe Foerster (3:15.29), Anna Terrell (54.74), Marlena Preigh (2:03.34), (Australia) Carley Thomas (4:30.02)	16 February 2024	Boston	
20	10:44.07i	Providence College	Shannon Flockhart, Jillian Fenerty, Alex O'Neill, Kimberley May	16 February 2024	Boston	
21	10:44.67i	Brigham Young University	Sadie Sargent, Sami Oblad, Meghan Hunter, Riley Chamberlain	16 February 2024	Boston	
22	10:44.71i	(United States) North Carolina Tar Heels	Makayla Paige, Delea Martins, Ella Auderset, Taryn Parks	21 February 2025	Boston	
23	10:45.32	Poland	Katarzyna Broniatowska, Monika Szczęsna, Angelika Cichocka, Sofia Ennaoui	2 May 2015	Nassau	
24	10:45.34i	BYU Cougars		14 March 2025	Virginia Beach	
25	10:45.99i	Oregon Ducks		14 March 2025	Virginia Beach	

== See also ==
- Sprint medley relay
- Swedish relay
