= Brooks Beasts Track Club =

American distance running club

Brooks Beasts Track Club is a professional running team based in Seattle and sponsored by Brooks Sports. The group includes runners specializing in distances from the 800 meters to the 5000 meters. The group trains primarily in Seattle under coach Danny Mackey.

Brooks Beasts was formed in 2013 when Brooks took up the task of launching a professional track team with the goal of helping athletes win medals at National, World, and Olympic championships.

Beasts athletes include National, Worlds and Olympic qualifiers and multiple NCAA All-Americans, NCAA champions, and record-holders in both NCAA Division I and NCAA Division II. It has featured numerous U.S. Top 5 and World Top 25 runners.

== Members ==
The Brooks Beasts have had many members over the years. Some have left the team for various reasons.

=== Men ===
- Brandon Miller (USA) (2023-present)
- Brannon Kidder (USA) (2016-present)
- Dillon Maggard (USA) (2023-present)
- Gary Martin (USA) (2026-present)
- Henry Wynne (USA) (2017-present)
- Isaiah Harris (USA) (2022-present)
- Josh Kerr (SCO) (2018-present)
- Kyle Langford (ENG) (2022-present)
- Waleed Suliman (USA) (2021-present)
- Parker Stokes (USA) (2024-present)
- Josh Rivera (PRI) (2025-present)

=== Women ===
- Allie Buchalski (USA) (2018-present)
- Kayley Delay (USA) (2023-present)
- Marta Pen Freitas (POR) (2019-present)
- Valery Tobias (MEX) (2023-present)
- Rebecca Mehra (USA) (2024-present)
- Teagan Schein-Becker (USA) (2023-present)

Former Members

- Spencer Brown (USA) (2020-2021)
- Michael Eaton (USA) (-2020)
- Casimir Loxsom (USA) (2014-)
- Katie Mackey (USA) (2013-)
- Riley Masters (USA)
- Jessica McClain (USA) (2015-)
- Baylee Mires (USA)(2016-2018)
- Karisa Nelson (USA) (2019-2022)
- Allie Ostrander (USA) (2019-2021)
- Matt Scherer (USA) (2013-2014)
- Nick Symmonds (USA) (2014-2017)
- Ryan Vail (USA)
- Julia Cigarroa Heymach (USA) (2022)
- Laurie Barton (USA) (2021)
- Devin Dixon (USA) (2021)
- Isaiah Harris (USA) (2022)
- Garrett Heath (USA) (2014)
- Izaic Yorks (USA) (2017)
- Drew Windle (USA) (2015)
- David Ribich (USA) (2018)
