= Gary Martin =

Gary Martin may refer to:

- Gary Martin (actor) (born 1958), English voice actor and actor
- Gary Martin (Zimbabwean cricketer) (born 1966), former Zimbabwean ODI cricket bowler
- Gary Martin (English cricketer) (born 1968), former English cricketer
- Gary Martin (ethnobotanist) (born 1958), American anthropologist and ethnobotanist
- Gary Martin (footballer) (born 1990), English association footballer
- Gary Martin (programmer)
- Gary Martin (reporter) (1958–2022), American politics reporter
- Gary Martin (runner) (born 2003), American track and field athlete
- Gary E. Martin (born 1940), American chemist
- Gary Martin (lacrosse)
- Gary Montez Martin, perpetrator of the Aurora, Illinois shooting
