= Gary Martin (reporter) =

American journalist (1958–2022)

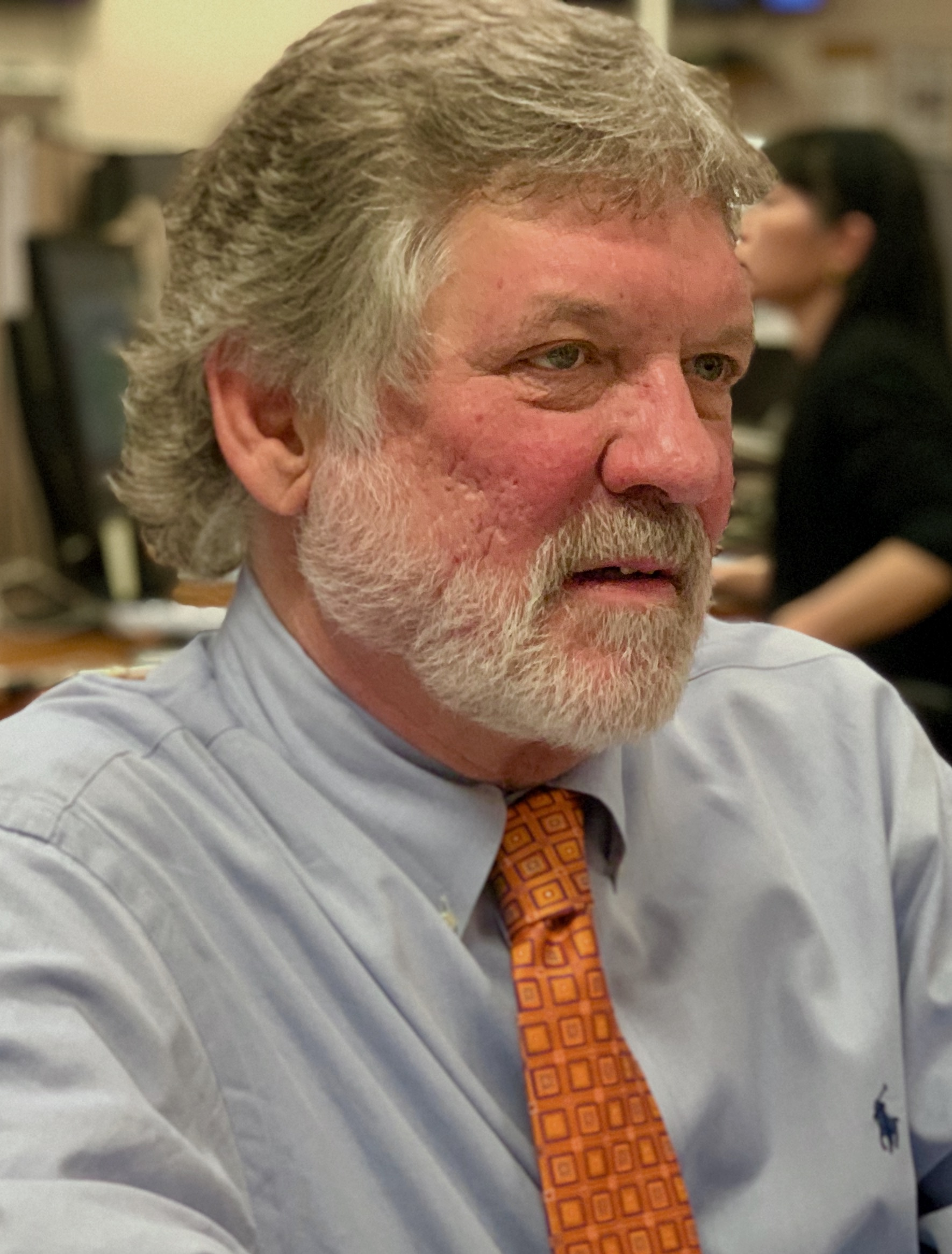
- Born: 1958; Boulder, Colorado, U.S.
- Died: November 10, 2022 (aged 64); Las Vegas Valley, Nevada, U.S.
- Education: Colorado State University
- Occupation: Journalist
- Employer(s): Las Vegas Review-Journal; San Antonio Express-News

Gary Martin (1958 – November 10, 2022) was an American politics reporter. He was a Washington bureau chief who covered the United States Congress for the Las Vegas Review-Journal.

Martin was a native of Boulder, Colorado. He attended Colorado State University. He had a decades-long career reporting on government and working as a Washington correspondent, starting at the San Antonio Express-News.

Martin won a Sigma Delta Chi Award from the Society of Professional Journalists for leading the reporting team at the Express-News that broke the story about Supreme Court Justice Antonin Scalia's death.

Martin was found dead in a hotel room in Las Vegas after reporting on the 2022 United States elections two months after the murder of his colleague Jeff German. The local police stated he died of natural causes. He was remembered by U.S. Representative Mark E. Amodei who stated, "LVRJ reporter Gary Martin was a thoughtful journalist. Nevada will miss the professionalism he brought to covering politics in our state. Rest In Peace Gary." He was remembered by another U.S. Representative, Charlie Gonzalez who recalled Martin as “one of the greatest reporters that we ever had out of San Antonio and just a wonderful human being.”
