= Izaic Yorks =

American runner and author

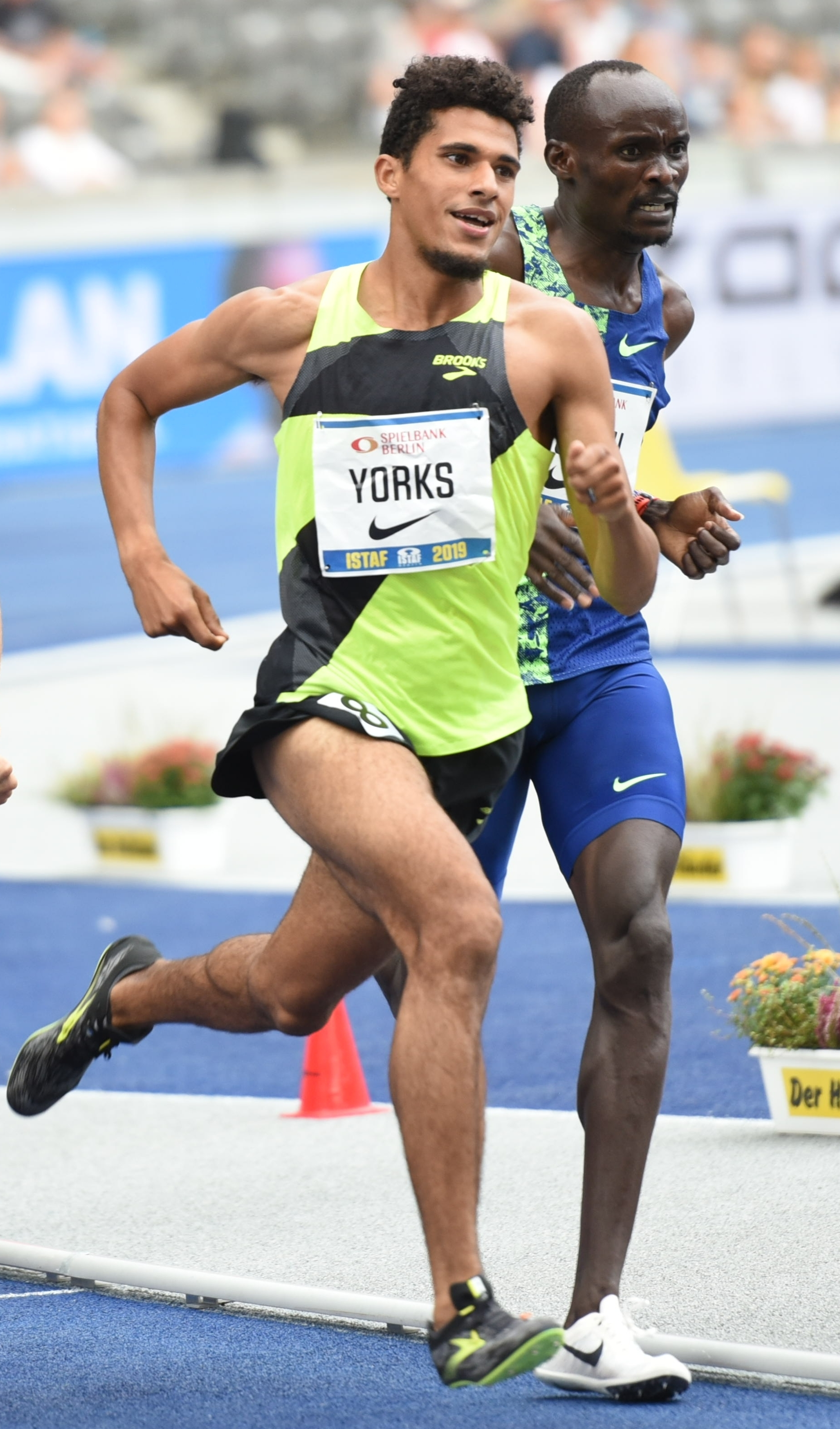

Personal information
- Nationality: United States
- Born: April 17, 1994 (age 32) Detroit, Michigan, U.S.
- Height: 5 ft 10 in (1.78 m)

Sport
- Sport: Track, long-distance running
- Events: 5000 meters, mile, 5000 meters, 10,000 meters
- College team: University of Washington
- Club: Brooks Beasts Track Club (Seattle))
- Turned pro: 2016

Achievements and titles
- Personal bests: 1500 metres: 3:36.52; 1 mile: 3:53.89
Medal record
Men's athletics
Representing United States
NACAC Championships
Gold medal – first place	2018 Toronto	1500 m
IAAF World U20 Championships
	2012 Barcelona	1500 m

Izaic Yorks (born April 17, 1994) is an American middle-distance and long-distance runner. Yorks won 1500 m at 2018 NACAC Championships. As a member of the Washington Huskies, Izaic Yorks is an eight-time NCAA Division I All-American cross country and track and field runner.

== Professional ==
Izaic Yorks signed with Brooks Sports in June 2016. Izaic is also a science fiction/fantasy author, releasing "Ascendant: Saga of Valor" in 2023.

The Men's race featured four Furman Elite athletes battling it out with Brooks Beasts' Izaic Yorks. Caleb Hoover would be the eventual victor in 7:52.07, dragging the next four men under the 8 minute barrier with him.

Yorks placed 3rd at the 2017 Sir Walter Miler Men's Elite Mile in 3:58.57.

Izaic Yorks is working as a Special Olympics Ambassador "because working with people in the community who have disabilities of any kind has been ingrained in my life. My sister is in a wheel chair and has had some developmental challenges to overcome. When I was asked it was easy to say yes."

Year	Competition	Venue	Position	Event	Notes
Representing the United States
2018	2018 NACAC Championships	Toronto, Canada	1st	1500 m	3:51.85
2012	2012 World Junior Championships in Athletics	Barcelona, Catalonia, Spain	19th	1500 m	3:49.21
USATF Championships
Representing Brooks
2018	2018 USA Outdoor Track and Field Championships	Des Moines, Iowa	2nd	1500 m	3:43.63
2018	2018 USA Indoor Track and Field Championships	Albuquerque, New Mexico	8th	3000 m	8:04.68
2017	2017 USA Outdoor Track and Field Championships	Sacramento, California	28th	1500 m	3:45.34
2016	USA Olympic Trials & Outdoor Track and Field Championships	Eugene, Oregon	10th	1500 m	3:40.34
Representing Lakes High School
2012	2012 USA Junior Outdoor Track and Field Championships	Bloomington, Indiana	2nd	1500 m	3:46.67

== NCAA ==
Izaic Yorks won back to back 1500 m Pac-12 Champion titles in 2015 and 2016. Yorks is an eight-time NCAA Division I All-America as a Washington Huskies. He is the 2015 and 2016 track and field MPSF mile champion.

representing Washington Huskies
Year	Pac-12 Cross Country	NCAA Cross Country	MPSF indoor	NCAA indoor	Pac-12 Outdoor	NCAA Outdoor
2015–16	3rd 23:15.0	30th 30:19.2	Mile 1st 3:53.89	DMR 2nd 9:28.00	1500 metres 1st 3:39.14	1500 metres 2nd 3:38.06
2015–16			3000 metres 1st 9:08.09	3000 metres 4th 8:02.24	800 metres 4th 1:48.00	
2014–15	25th 24:18.6	159th 32:01.7	Mile 1st 3:57.81	Mile 14th 4:01.84	1500 metres 1st 3:46.42	1500 metres 13th 3:56.76
2014–15					800 m 7th 1:51.20	
2013–14	38th 26:17.0		Mile 9th 4:06.16	Mile 15th 4:13.17		1500 metres 21st 3:49.51
2013–14			DMR 1st 9:31.82		800 metres 6th 1:51.56	
representing Portland Pilots
Year	WCC Cross Country	NCAA Cross Country	MPSF indoor	NCAA indoor	WCC Outdoor Track	NCAA Outdoor
2012-13	39th 25:27				1500 m 9th 3:49.10	

== Prep ==
Yorks competed for Lakes High School where he won the 1,600 meter 2012 Washington Interscholastic Activities Association 3A state title in 4:04.77, and won the 800-meter state title in a school record time of 1:50.56 (ranked 16th USA High School).

Yorks set Lakes High School records in

- 800 meters: 1:50.56
- 1500 meters: 4:00.10
- 1600 meters: 4:04.00 (Washington state record)
- Mile: 4:04.38
- 3200 meters: 9:05.43

Yorks finishing eighth in 4:04.38 at the 2012 Jim Ryun Dream Mile in New York.

Yorks placed fourth at the 2011 Nike Cross Nationals Championships in Portland.

Yorks placed third at the 2011 Washington Interscholastic Activities Association 3A cross country state meet(15:05 – 5 km).
