= Kyle Merber =

American middle-distance runner

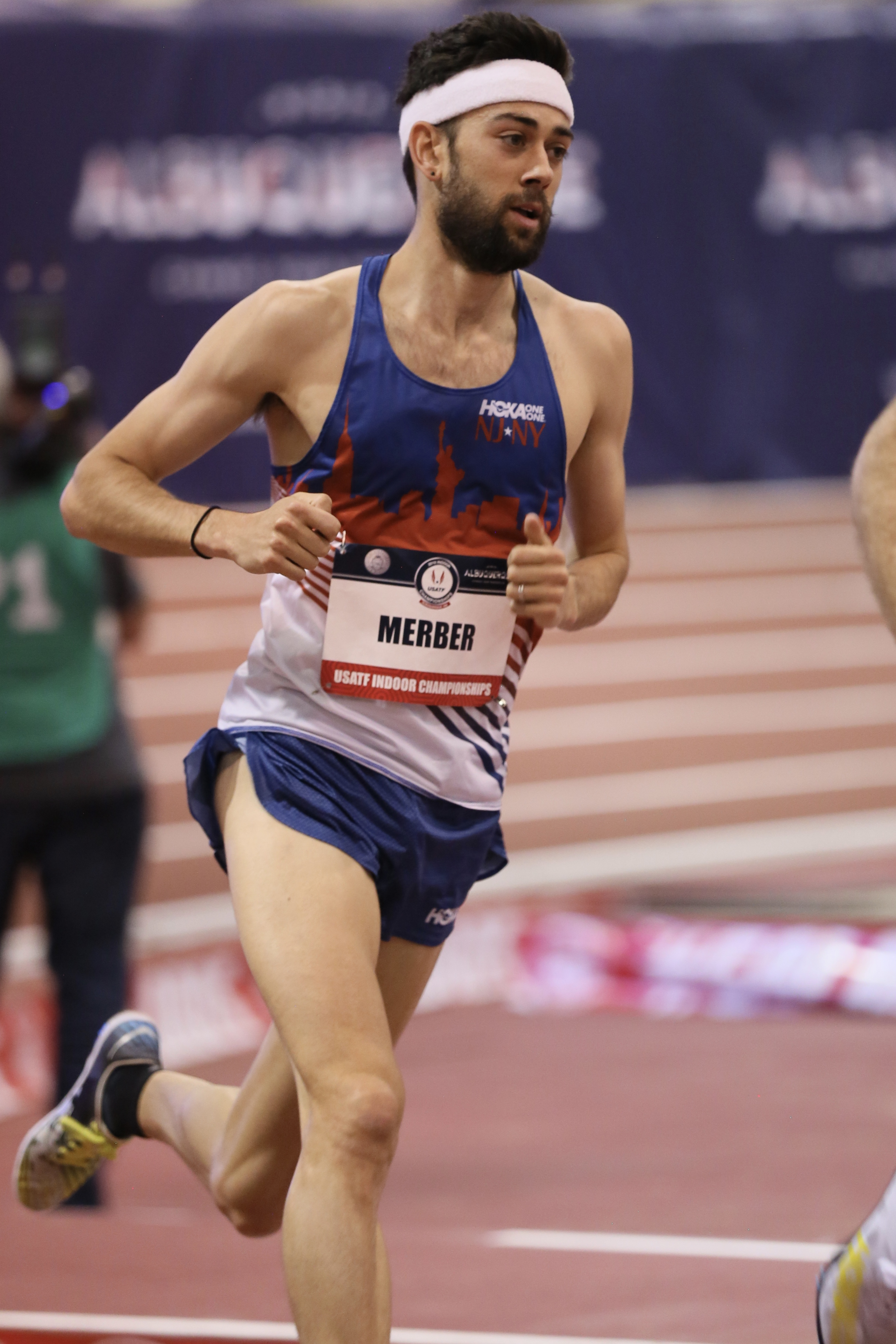

Personal information
- Nationality: American
- Born: 19 November 1990 (age 35) Bronxville, New York, U.S.
- Height: 5 ft 11 in (1.80 m)
- Weight: 138 lb (63 kg)
- Website: http://kylemerber.com/

Sport
- Events: Mile, 1500 metres
- College team: Columbia; Texas
- Club: New Jersey*New York Track Club

Achievements and titles
- Personal bests: 800 meters: 1:47.23; 1500 meters: 3:34.54

Kyle Merber (born November 19, 1990) is an American former mid-distance runner who specialized in the mile and the 1500 metres. He competed in the 2016 U.S. Olympic Trials and was sponsored by Hoka One One. Merber also represented the New Jersey New York Track Club. He retired from the sport in 2021.

== Running career ==
=== High school ===
In 6th grade, Merber began sprint training with Charlie Bell, a local high school coach from New Jersey. He would practice sprinting with a bungee cord tied to him for strength development. Merber attended Half Hollow Hills West High School in New York, where he competed in cross country and track. During high school he was successful in a wide range of events, posting personal bests of 1:53 in the 800 meters and 9:06 in the 3200 meters.

=== Collegiate ===
Merber first attended Columbia University, where he specialized in the mile and 1500. At Columbia, Merber set the Ivy League indoor mile record when he finished in 3:58.52 at the 2010 Columbia Last Chance meet at the Armory. That summer, however, Merber stepped on a piece of glass during a training run near his home on Long Island, which put him out of competition for a year. Merber had a resurgent senior year, and in May 2012, at the Swarthmore Last Chance Meet, he outkicked Nate Brannen to set an American collegiate 1500 meter record in 3:35.59. He graduated from Columbia in 2012.

The following school year, Merber enrolled in a masters program at the University of Texas at Austin, where he used his remaining year of NCAA eligibility resulting from his missed junior season at Columbia.

=== Professional ===
After graduating from UT in 2013, Merber joined the New Jersey*New York Track Club under coach Frank Gagliano. He is also sponsored by HOKA ONE ONE. He was a member of the United States' distance medley relay team which set the world record of 9:15.50 at the 2015 IAAF World Relays in Nassau.

Merber competed in the 2016 United States Olympic trials (track and field), placing ninth in the 1,500 meters final with a time of 3:40.27.

Merber has been a resident of Clinton, New Jersey.

Merber announced his retirement on instagram on January 4, 2021.

As of 2025, Merber is the director of Athletes and Racing for Michael Johnson's Grand Slam Track League.

== Personal bests ==
Surface	Event	Time	Date	Location
Outdoor
Outdoor	1500 m	3:34.54	May 30, 2015	Greenville, SC
Outdoor	Mile	3:54.57	August 5, 2016	Raleigh, NC
Indoor
Indoor	Mile	3:52.22	February 26, 2016	Boston, MA
Indoor	3000 m	7:49.39	January 28, 2017	New York (Armory), NY
Road	Mile	3:53.5	September 13, 2014	New York, NY
