= Parker Stokes =

American athlete (born 2000)

Personal information
- Nationality: American
- Born: September 5, 2000 (age 26)

Sport
- Sport: Athletics
- Event: Steeplechase

Achievements and titles
- Personal best: 3000m Steeplechase: 8:18.88 (2022)

Parker Stokes (born 5 September 2000) is an American steeplechaser. He won the 3000 metres steeplechase at the 2024 NCAA Championships.

== Biography ==
From Endicott, Stokes attended Maine-Endwell Senior High School in New York State. He won an age-group national title in the steeplechase in 2018. As a collegiate sophomore he broke the four minute barrier for the mile for the first time in 2021, running 3:59.89 at the Virginia Grand Prix.

Competing for Georgetown University, Stokes ran a personal best time for the 3000 metres steeplechase of 8:18.88 at the 2022 NCAA Outdoor Championships, running to a third-place finish, and moving into the top-ten on the NCAA all-time list. Stokes became the NCAA 3000 metres steeplechase champion at the 2024 NCAA Championships. Having later ran at the 2024 Olympic Trials, he signed a professional contract with Brooks Beasts Track Club. That summer, he was named the Big East Conference Male Scholar-Athlete of the Year. Stokes was a finalist in the 3000 metres steeplechase at the 2025 USA Outdoor Track and Field Championships, placing eleventh overall.

Running for Brooks Beasts, Stokes won the 3000 metres steeplechase at the 2026 LA Track Fest. On 23 July 2026, competing in the 3000 metres steeplechase at the 2026 USA Outdoor Track and Field Championships in New York, he was the fastest qualifier for the final with a time of 8:23.04.

== Personal life ==
In 2024, he graduated from Georgetown University with a Master of Science in management and business administration from McDonough School of Business.
