= Gary Martin (ethnobotanist) =

Gary John Martin (born 1958) is an American anthropologist, ethnobotanist and conservationist, known for his 1995 book Ethnobotany: a methods manual, which has been translated into Bahasa Melayu, Mandarin and Spanish.

Gary Martin received from Michigan State University his B.S. in botany in 1980 and from U. C. Berkeley two degrees in anthropology, M.A. in 1982 and Ph.D. in 1996 with thesis Comparative Ethnobotany of the Chinantec and Mixe of the Sierra Norte, Oaxaca, Mexico. He is the Director of the Global Diversity Foundation. He has done applied research and training in ethnobotany and conservation in more than forty-five countries, including the Dominican Republic, India, Mexico, China and Thailand.

From 1998 – 2011, Gary was a research fellow and lecturer at the School of Anthropology and Conservation of the University of Kent in Canterbury, UK. Between 2010-2012, he was a Carson Fellow at the Rachel Carson Center for Society and Environment in Munich, Germany. Since 2011, he has been the Director of the Global Environments Summer Academy and is the creator of the incipient Global Environments Network. He is a native speaker of English, also speaks Spanish and French, and is learning Moroccan Arabic.

== Selected publications ==
- with Sergio Madrid: "Ethnobotany, distribution, and conservation status of Ticondendron incognitum in northern Oaxaca, Mexico". J. Ethnobiol. 12: 227–231. 1992.
- "Searching for plants in peasant marketplaces". Sustainable harvest and marketing of rain forest products. Washington, DC: Island Press. 1992. pp. 212–223.
- with Alison Semple: "Joint ventures in applied ethnobotany". Nature and Resources (UNESCO). 1994.
- "Conservation and ethnobotanical exploration". Ethnobotany and the Search for New Drugs: 229–239. 1994.
- with Abderrahim Ouarghidi, Bronwen Powell, Gabrielle Esser, and Abdelaziz Abbad: Ouarghidi, Abderrahim; Martin, Gary J.; Powell, Bronwen; Esser, Gabrielle; Abbad, Abdelaziz (2013). "Botanical identification of medicinal roots collected and traded in Morocco and comparison to the existing literature". Journal of Ethnobiology and Ethnomedicine. 9 (95): 59. doi:10.1186/1746-4269-9-59. PMC 3846589. PMID 23945196.
