= Brooks Sports =

Sportswear company

Brooks Sports, Inc.
- Type: Subsidiary
- Industry: Sports equipment
- Founded: 1914; 112 years ago in Philadelphia, Pennsylvania
- Founder: John Brooks Goldenberg
- Headquarters: Seattle, Washington, U.S.
- Area served: Worldwide
- Key people: Dan Sheridan (CEO)
- Products: Sneakers, clothing
- Revenue: ▲US$1.2 billion (2022)
- Number of employees: c. 1,100
- Parent: Berkshire Hathaway
- Website: brooksrunning.com

Brooks Sports, Inc., also known as Brooks Running, is an American sports equipment company that designs and markets high-performance men's and women's sneakers, clothing, and accessories. Headquartered in Seattle, Washington, Brooks products are available in 60 countries worldwide. The company is a subsidiary of Berkshire Hathaway.

Founded in 1914, Brooks originally manufactured shoes for a broad range of sports. Popular in the mid-1970s, the company faltered in the latter part of the decade, and filed for bankruptcy protection in 1981. In 2001, the product line was cut by more than 50% to focus the brand solely on running, and its concentration on performance technology was increased. Brooks Running became the top selling brand in the specialty running shoe market in 2011, and remained so through 2017 with a 25% market share.

== History ==
=== Early history: Founding, Bruxshu Gymnasium Shoes, Carmen Manufacturing ===
Brooks Sports, Inc. was founded in 1914 by John Brooks Goldenberg, following his purchase of the Quaker Shoe Company, a manufacturer of bathing shoes and ballet slippers. Based in Philadelphia, it operated as a partnership between Goldenberg and his brothers, Michael and Frank. By 1920, Quaker Shoes had been renamed Brooks Shoe Manufacturing Co., Inc., and its shoes were sold under the brand name Bruxshu. In addition to bathing shoes and ballet slippers, it sold a gymnasium shoe, Ironclad Gyms. The company's innovations included the 1938 introduction of orthopedic shoes for children, Pedicraft, (Note: They were also renowned for their football shoes, track shoes, baseball shoes and ice skates.) and rubber brakes for roller skates (then known as "quick stops"), patented in 1944.

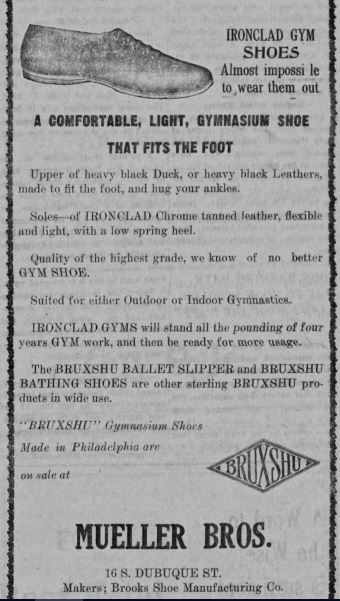
1920 ad for Bruxshu Gymnasium Shoes

In 1938, the Goldenbergs purchased the Carmen Shoe Manufacturing Company in Hanover, Pennsylvania. Until 1957, a better grade leather was purchased, cut, stitched and fit in Philadelphia, while the same procedure in Hanover used lower grade materials. Both shoes were sold in Philadelphia under the Brooks name, and ranged from inexpensive to high-priced.

In 1956, after a series of operational changes, John notified his brother that he would not renew their partnership agreement, and Michael discussed expanding Carmen with his nephew, Frank's son Barton. In 1957, following the dissolution of the partnership, the existence of Brooks Shoe Manufacturing Company was terminated, and Michael and Barton each acquired 50% of Carmen. In 1958, Michael purchased Barton's interest in the company, and as the sole owner, he renamed Carmen the Brooks Manufacturing Company.

In 1967, Brooks opened its first international factory in Aguadilla, Puerto Rico.

=== 1970s: Introduction of EVA ===
In 1975, under then-CEO Jerome A. Turner, Brooks worked with elite runners, including Marty Liquori, a former Olympian, to design a running shoe. The collaboration produced the Villanova, Brooks's first high-performance running shoe. It was the first running shoe to use EVA, an air-infused foam that was later adopted by other athletic brands. In 1977, Brooks introduced the Vantage, a running shoe constructed with a wedge to address overpronation. Towards the end of the decade, Brooks was among the top three selling brands in the U.S.

=== 1980s: Bankruptcy, the Chariot, Brooks for Women ===
In 1980, as a result of production issues with Brooks' manufacturing facility in Puerto Rico, defective shoes began to arrive at sporting goods stores. Nearly 30% of the shoes were returned, and Brooks scrapped 50,000 pairs. The company filed for Chapter 11 bankruptcy, and was purchased at auction by footwear manufacturer Wolverine World Wide in 1981.

In 1982, Brooks introduced the Chariot, a medial post shoe that featured an angled wedge of harder-density foam in the midsole. It was thicker on the inside of the shoe and tapered toward the outside. In 1987, Brooks launched an anatomically adjusted line of shoes designed for women.

During the 1980s, Brooks produced a line of basketball shoes such as the Unique and the Highlight, which were worn by NBA hall-of-famer Dominique Wilkins.

=== 1990s: The Beast, Adrenaline, ownership changes, apparel, Run Happy ===
In 1992, Brooks launched the Beast, a motion control shoe that integrated diagonal rollbar technology. In 1994, the Adrenaline GTS—an abbreviation for go-to support—was released. The Adrenaline GTS was built on a semi-curve, an accommodation for runners with a high arch and wide forefoot. The Beast became a best seller, and the Adrenaline GTS went on to become one of the best-selling running shoes of all time.

Wolverine World Wide moved Brooks away from the niche running market to a generalist athletic brand. The "class to mass" strategy was unsuccessful, and Brooks was sold to Norwegian private equity company The Røkke Group for US$21 million in 1993. Following the acquisition, Røkke moved Brooks to Bothell, Washington. In 1998, Røkke sold a majority interest in Brooks to J. H. Whitney & Co., a Connecticut private equity firm.

Brooks introduced a full-line of technical running and fitness apparel for women and men in the spring of 1997. It also expanded into the walking category with the introduction of performance walking shoes.

Brooks's Run Happy tag line first appeared in print advertising in 1999. Rather than depicting running as a grueling pursuit, as competitive brands did, Run Happy was based on the idea that runners love running, and suggested that Brooks products allowed "runners to have the running experience they were looking for".

=== 2000s: Jim Weber, Berkshire Hathaway, BioMoGo ===
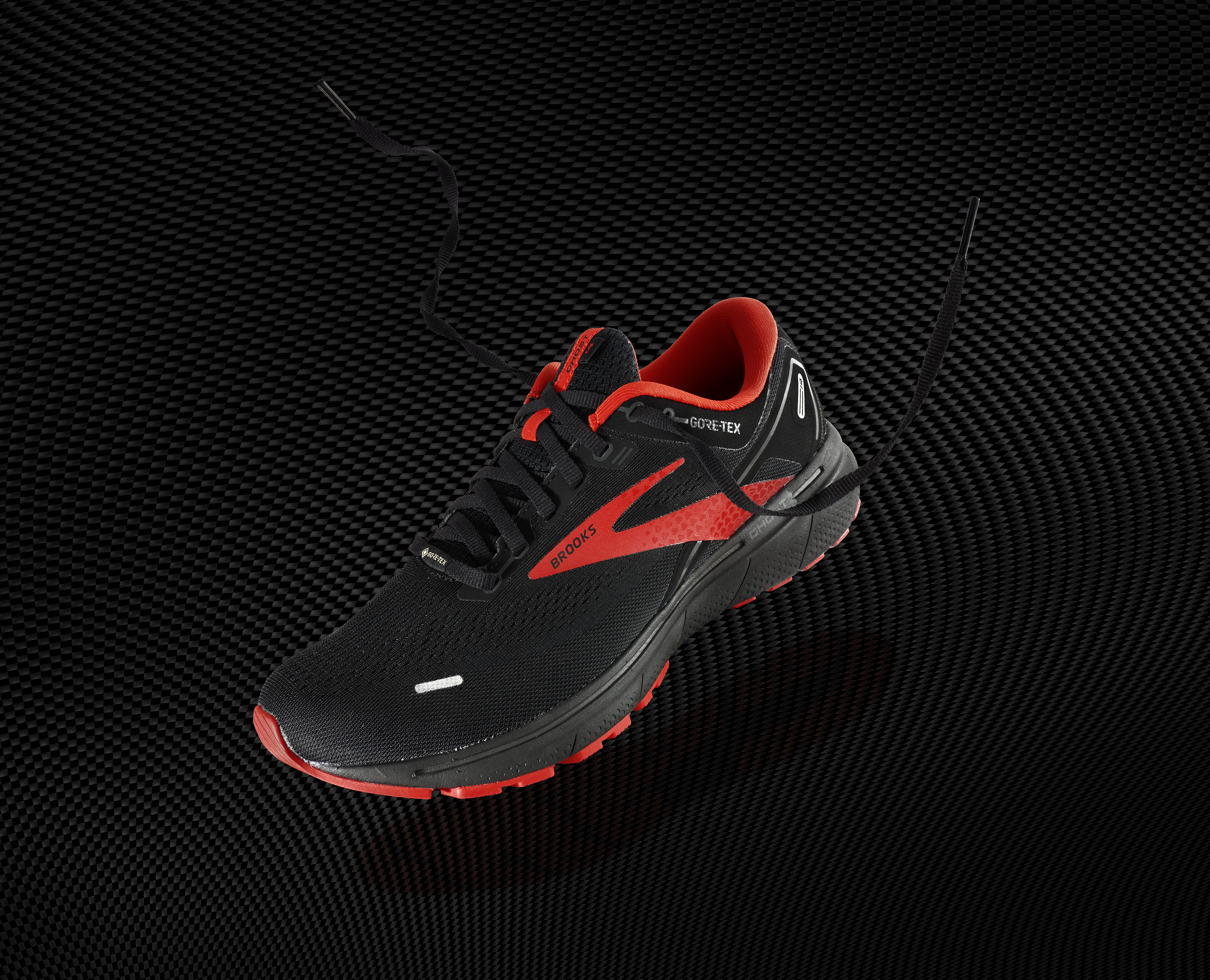
Brooks Ghost 14 GTX, men's Waterproof Neutral Running Shoe (2022)

In 2001, Jim Weber, a former Brooks board member, was named president and CEO of the company. At the time, the company's market share was low, and bankruptcy had again become a concern. Weber cut lower-priced footwear from the Brooks product line, added an on-site lab and staff engineers, and focused the company on technical-performance running shoes. As the brand was rebuilt, its annual revenue fell to $20 million. Three years later, it was $69 million.

Brooks was acquired by Russell Athletic in 2004. Two years later, Russell Athletic was purchased by Fruit of the Loom, and Brooks became a subsidiary of Fruit of the Loom's parent company, Berkshire Hathaway. Brooks became an independent subsidiary of Berkshire Hathaway in 2011.

In the mid-2000s, Brooks introduced High Performance Green Rubber, a material it developed for outsoles that used sand rather than petroleum. It subsequently developed BioMoGo, a biodegradable mid-sole for running shoes. Brooks made the technology open source and estimated that it would cut more than 30 million pounds of landfill waste over a 20-year period.

Brooks introduced the Ghost running shoe in 2008. The Ghost has since become one of the best-selling shoe lines in the running world.

=== 2010s: DNA, $500 million milestone, Brooks Heritage ===
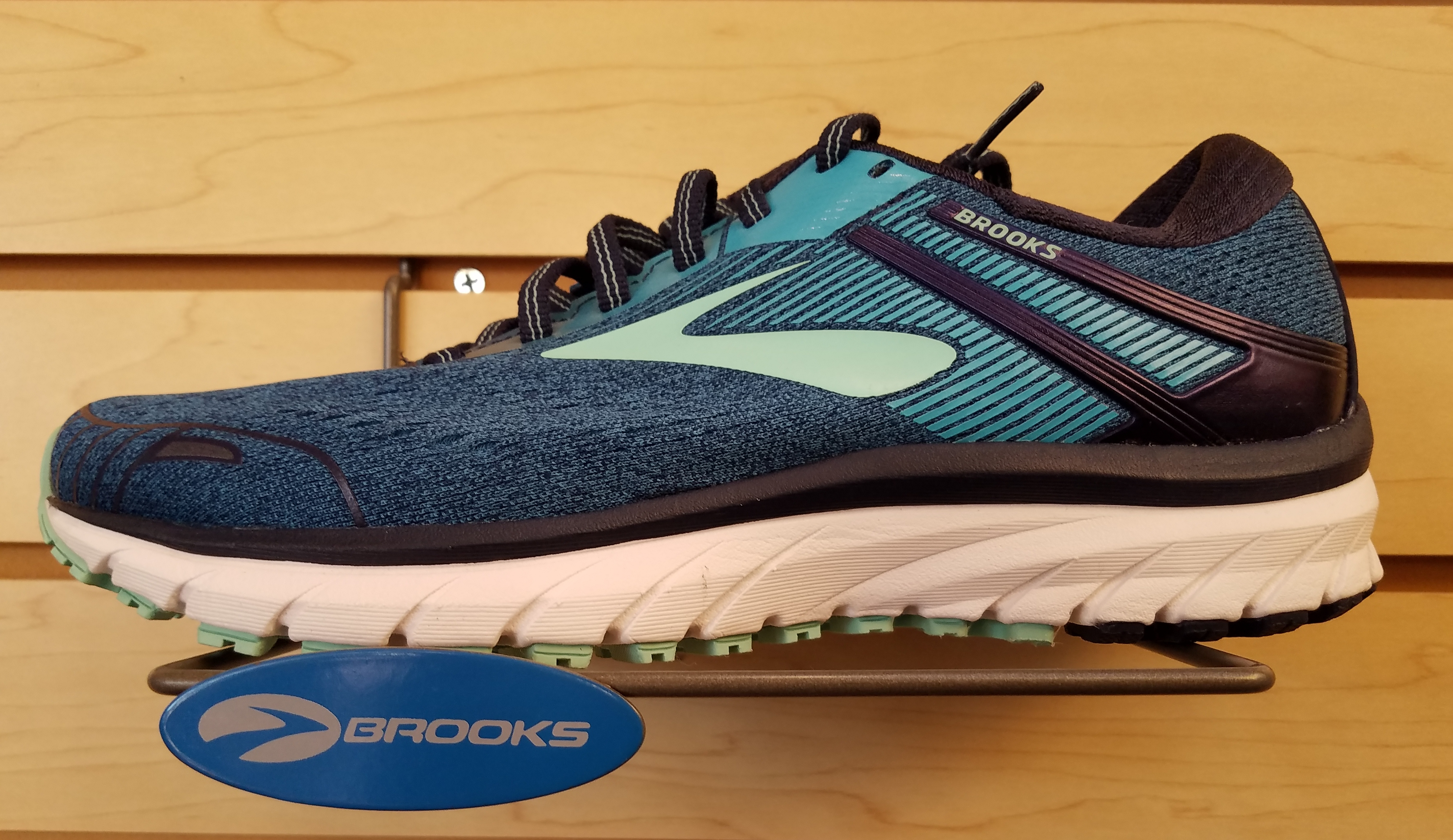
Brooks Adrenaline GTS 18 (2017)

Introduced in 2013, Brooks DNA (and later Super DNA) adapted to the user's gender, weight and pace. It was engineered from non-Newtonian liquid.

In 2011, Brooks became the leading running shoe in the specialty market with revenue of US$500 million.

The Brooks Heritage Collection was launched in 2016, returning the Vanguard, the Chariot, and the Beast to the market. Only the technology was updated; the details of the original shoes, including the colorways, were replicated.

=== 2020s: Let's Run There ===
Brooks store at GH Mall, San Juan, Metro Manila, Philippines.

In 2024, Brooks launched a marketing campaign with the slogan: "Let's Run There", with the spotlight on actor Jeremy Renner's road to recovery from a near-fatal snowplow accident a year prior.

In 2025, Brooks launched its lifestyle division with the Adrenaline GTS 10, a remake of the 2009 running shoe with a modern DNA midsole.

== Accolades ==
Brooks was named Brand of the Year by Footwear News in 2012.

The Brooks Adrenaline GTS 19 was listed on Sports Illustrated's Best Running Shoes for men and women in 2019.

In 2025, Brooks shoes won numerous awards at the Runner's World Shoe Awards: Caldera 8 for Best Trail Shoes, and Glycerin Max, Glycerin GTS 22, and Ghost 17 for Best Training Shoes. In addition, the Ghost 18, Glycerin 23, and Adrenalin GTS 25 made the list of the 15 Best Running Shoes of 2026. At the 2026 Runner's World Shoe Awards, Brooks collected two awards: the Glycerin Flex for Best Training Shoes and the Cascadia Elite for Best Trail Shoes. Sports Illustrated listed the Hyperion Elite 5 on their 10 Best Running Shoes of Spring 2026.

== Sponsorships ==
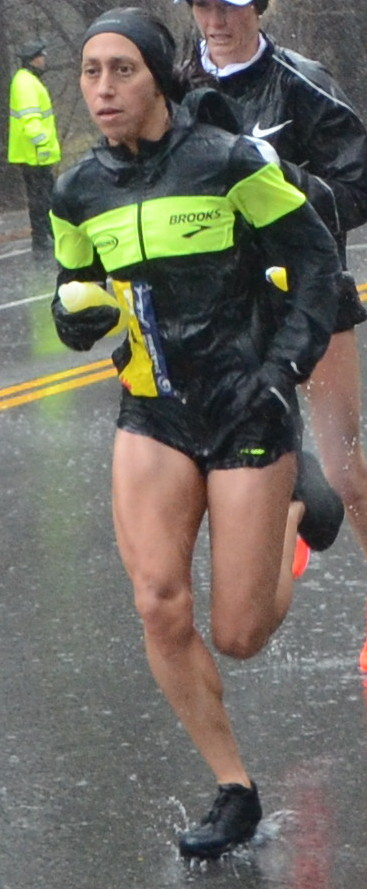
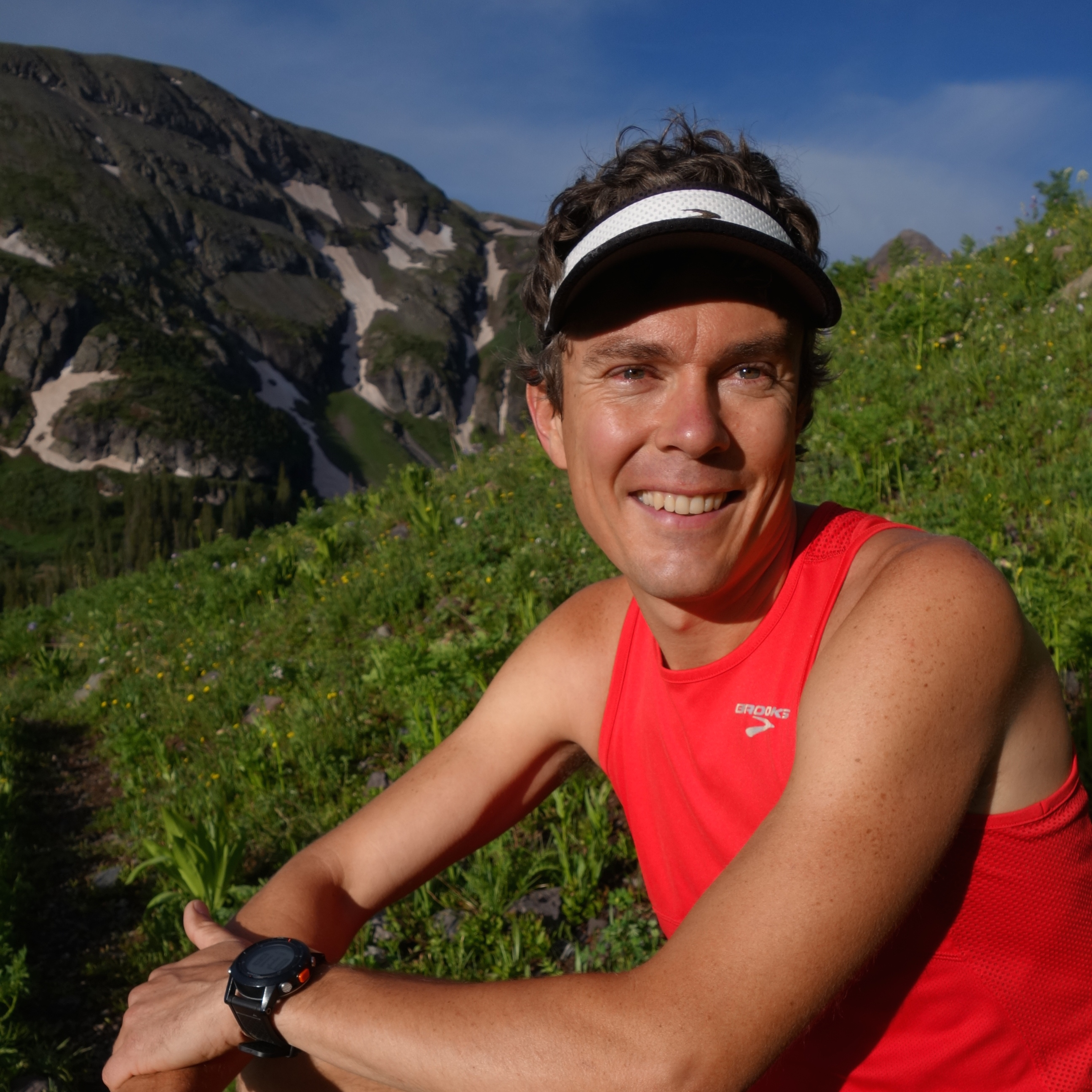
Brooks has signed long-distance runners Desiree Linden (left) and Scott Jurek.

Brooks sponsors the Brooks Beasts Track Club and Hansons-Brooks Distance Project. Notable past or present sponsors include two-time Olympic Medalist Josh Kerr, Olympic runner Dathan Ritzenhein, two-time Olympian Kara Goucher, Olympic runner Jess McClain, 2018 Boston Marathon winner Desiree Linden, and three-time Ironman World Champion Chrissie Wellington. Brooks has also sponsored celebrities such as Patrick Schwarzenegger and Cynthia Erivo.

In June 2025, Brooks became the main shirt sponsor for EFL League Two side Cambridge United.

Brooks is a major sponsor of runDisney, having released a line of Disney-themed running shoes for the half-marathon event.
