= Brandon Miller (runner) =

American middle-distance runner

- Miller (center) competes at the 2020 US Olympic Trials

Personal information
- Born: January 30, 2002 (age 24)
- Home town: St. Louis, Missouri, United States
- Height: 5 ft 7 in (170 cm)
- Weight: 140 lb (63.5 kg)

Sport
- Country: United States
- Sport: Track and field
- Events: 800m, 1500m
- College team: Texas A&M Aggies
- Club: Brooks Beasts Track Club
- Turned pro: 2022
- Coached by: Danny Mackey

Achievements and titles
- Personal bests: Outdoor; 400 m: 46.30 (College Station 2022); 800 m: 1:42.19 (London 2026); 1500 m: 3:35.27 (Los Angeles 2025); Indoor; 400 m: 47.32 (College Station 2021); 600 m: 1:14.03 (Albuquerque 2024); 800 m: 1:44.26 (Staten Island 2025)
Medal record
Athletics
Representing United States
NACAC Championships
Silver medal – second place	2025 Freeport	800 m

Brandon Miller (born January 30, 2002) is an American middle-distance runner who specializes in the 800 meters.

== Early career ==
As an 11-year-old sixth grader in O'Fallon, Missouri, Miller set national records for his age in the 800 and 1500 meters. In 2015, Miller broke the 13-year-old age group world record with a time of 1:56.41 and it held until 2026. In 2017, he set another world record for the 14-year-old age group with 1:51.23. That same year, he held the national freshman class record with a time of 1:49.87 before it was later broken by Cooper Lutkenhaus. As a senior at John Burroughs School in St. Louis, Missouri, Miller was named Gatorade Player of the Year for boys track and field.

Miller committed to run at Texas A&M University.

=== 2021 ===
In 2021, he placed second in the 800 meters at the 2021 NCAA Outdoor Track and Field Championships. He later competed in the same event at the 2020 United States Olympic trials and made the semifinals.

=== 2022 ===
In 2022, he won the 800 meters and 4 x 400 meter relays at the 2022 NCAA Indoor Track and Field Championships for his sophomore season with the Aggies. In the outdoor season, Miller finished third in the 800 meters at the 2022 NCAA Outdoor Track and Field Championships. He qualified for the 800 meters at the 2022 World Athletics Championships after finishing third at the 2022 USA Outdoor Track and Field Championships.

== Professional career ==
On November 2, 2022, Miller announced that he would turn professional in track and field.

On September 20, 2023, he decided to sign with Brooks Beasts Track Club.

=== 2024 ===
At the U.S. Olympic Trials in 2024, Miller qualified for the U.S. team by notching a personal best of 1:43.73 in his 800m semifinal, then running 1:43.97 for 3rd place in the final. At the 2024 Olympic Games, held in Paris, France, Miller did not qualify for a semifinal race in his round-1 heat, but finished first in his repechage heat to advance. On August 9, he finished fifth in his semifinal heat with a time of 1:45.79.

=== 2025 ===
On February 23, 2025, Miller ran a personal best of 1:44.26 in the 800 meters short track at the 2025 USA Indoor Track and Field Championships, placing second in the event behind Josh Hoey.

At the 2025 USA Outdoor Track and Field Championships, Miller ran a personal best of 1:43.14 in the 800 meters but only finished 5th in the event. On August 16, 2025, at the 2025 NACAC Championships, he ran to second place and a silver medal in the 800 meters with a time of 1:43.15, finishing behind Handal Roban.

=== 2026 ===
In 2026, Miller began running on the Diamond League circuit. At the 2026 Shanghai Diamond League, he ran to third place in the 800 meters with a time of 1:44.00. On May 23, 2026, he competed at the LA Track Festival and won the 800 meter race at 1:44.26. On June 14, he ran at the Los Angeles Grand Prix and won the race with a time of 1:43.94. On July 3, Miller won the 800 meters at the Prefontaine Classic with a time of 1:43.68, winning against Lutkenhaus. At the 2026 London Diamond League, Miller ran a personal best of 1:42.19 in the 800 meters to win the race.

== Personal life ==
Miller mentioned that his coach, Danny Mackey, helped him by pushing his training at altitude and that Josh Kerr influenced his racing style and maturity.
