= Isaiah Harris (runner) =

American middle-distance runner

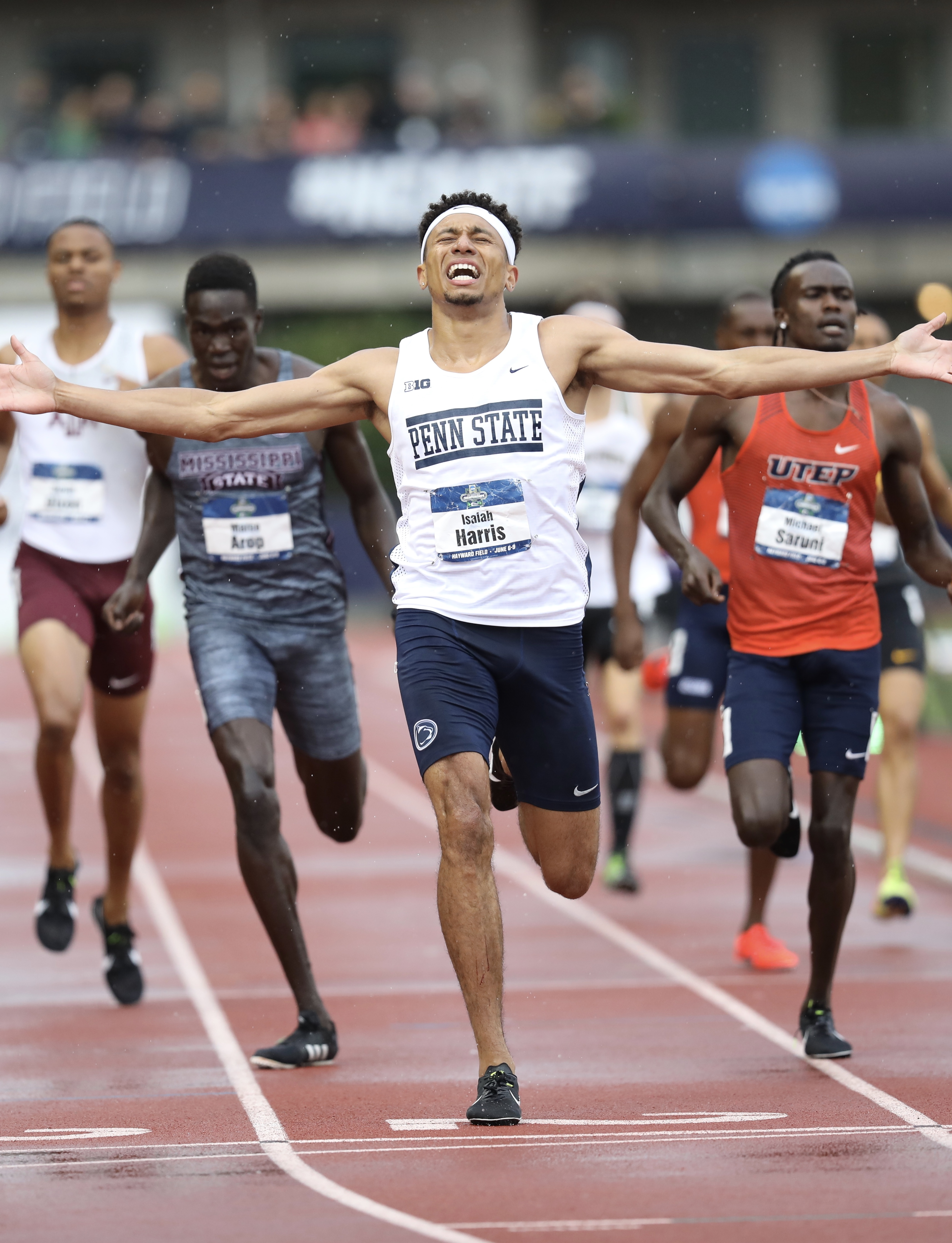
- Harris winning the 800 meters at the 2018 NCAA Division I Outdoor Track and Field Championships

Personal information
- Born: October 18, 1996 (age 30) Lewiston, Maine, U.S.

Sport
- Sport: Middle-distance running
- Event: 800 metres

Achievements and titles
- Personal best: 800 m – 1:44.53 (2017)

Isaiah Harris (born October 18, 1996) is an American middle-distance runner. He competed in the men's 800 metres at the 2017 World Championships in Athletics.

== Early running career ==
Isaiah Harris was born in Lewiston, Maine.

As an 8th grader, he won the 800 meter run and triple jump at the Andy Valley Middle School Championship.

In high school, Harris competed for the Lewiston Blue Devils cross country and outdoor track and field teams. In his sophomore year, which was first cross country season, he finished 6th at the Maine Class A State XC Championships with a time of 16:50.75. In his first high school outdoor track season, he came 2nd in a time of 2:03.78 in his debut 800 meter race. He went on to win every open 800 meter race he ran at the local/state level during his high school career. He finished his sophomore season anchoring the Blue Devils' 4x400 and 4x800 relays to 2nd place finishes at the Maine Class A State Championships in splits of 49 and 1:53, respectively. He also won the 800 meter run in a Class A record time of 1:54.17, breaking the previous record of 1:54.54 from 1998, held by Ben Fletcher. A week later, Isaiah improved upon his personal best and state record by finishing 2nd at the New England Track and Field Championships in a time of 1:53.35.

After finishing 2nd at the Maine State XC Championships in his junior year, he continued his dominance in outdoor track, winning every individual race he ran that season. At the Maine Class A State Championship he ran a sub 1:53 anchor leg on his team's 4x800 relay, but the relay was disqualified due to an earlier violation. He then won his second straight 800 meter title, improving upon his own state record in a time of 1:52.96 and winning the race by over 9 seconds. He followed this by winning the 200 meter dash in a time of 22.76 less than 45 minutes later, and finished the meet by anchoring the 4x400 relay to a school record and second place finish in a time of 3:27.07, contributing a split of 47 seconds. He later won the 800 meter run at the New England Championships in a time of 1:51.47.

As a senior, Harris attempted a triple that had never been won by a male in Class A Championship meet history - the 200 meter dash, 800 meter run, and 1600 meter run. He won all three with times of 22.25, 1:55.42 and 4:18.92 respectively. He also anchored the 4x400 meter relay to a win in a time of 3:28.24. Harris was responsible for 32.5 of Lewiston's 71 points, and the Lewiston boys' team won their first team state championship since 2006. Harris attempted the 800/200 double again at the New England Championships, winning the 800 and finishing 4th in the 200 in a new state record time of 21.82. He finished his high school career by running 1:49.63 and finishing 3rd at the New Balance Outdoor Nationals, earning All-American status.

== International competitions ==
Year	Competition	Venue	Position	Event	Notes
Representing the United States
2016	NACAC U23 Championships	San Salvador, El Salvador	1st	800 m	1:47.52
2017	World Championships	London, United Kingdom	17th (sf)	800 m	1:46.66
2022	World Indoor Championships	Belgrade, Serbia	7th (h)	800 m	1:47.00
2022	World Indoor Championships	Belgrade, Serbia	8th (h)	4 × 400 m relay	3:09.11
2023	World Championships	Budapest, Hungary	43rd (h)	800 m	1:48.00
2024	World Indoor Championships	Glasgow, United Kingdom	9th (sf)	800 m	1:48.18
