= Brannon Kidder =

American middle-distance runner

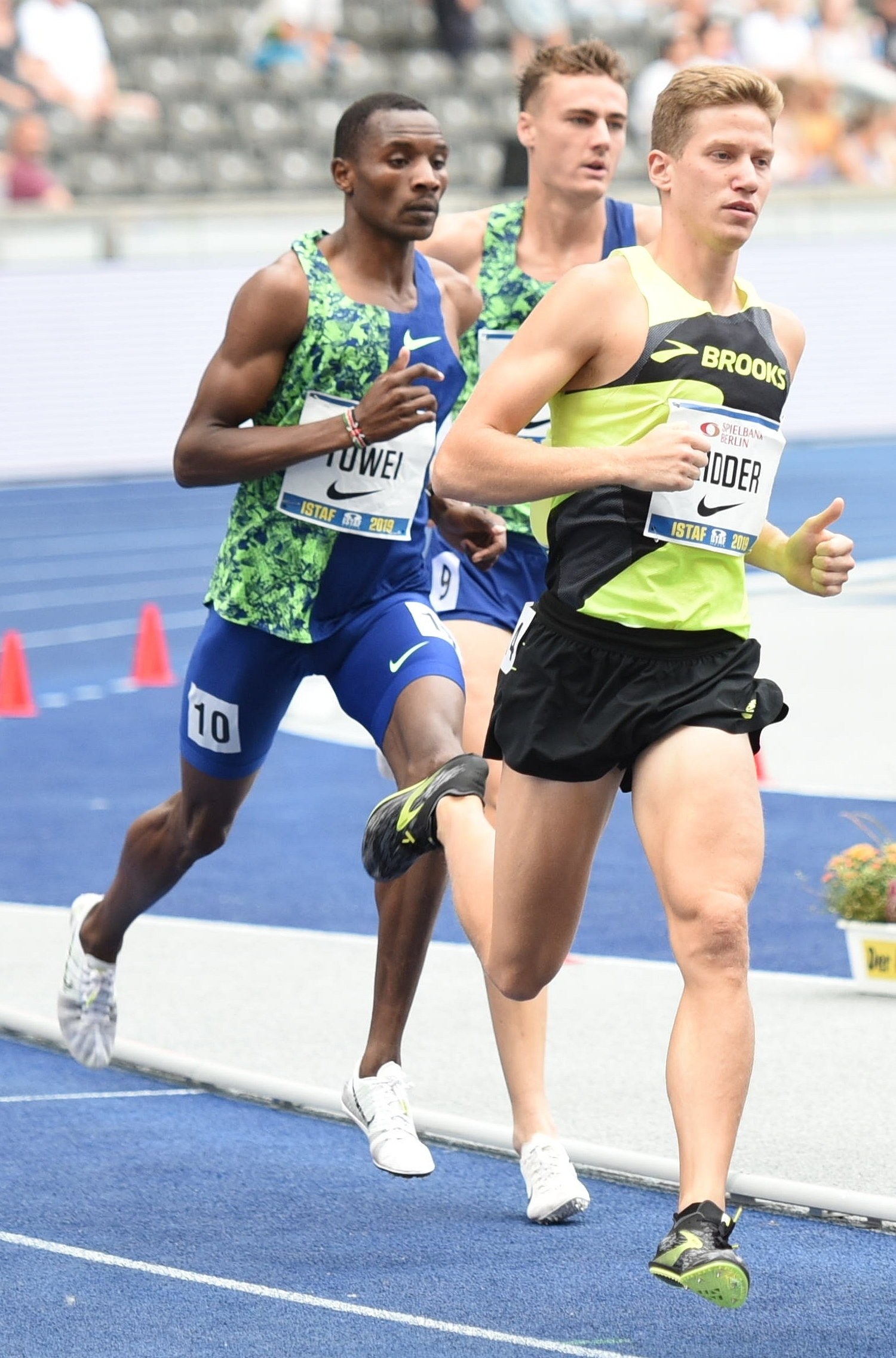
- Kidder in 2019

Personal information
- Born: November 18, 1993 (age 32) Lancaster, Ohio, U.S.
- Home town: Lancaster, Ohio, U.S.

Sport
- Country: United States
- Sport: Track and field
- Event: Middle-distance running

Brannon Kidder (born November 18, 1993) is an American middle-distance runner.

In 2017, he won the gold medal in the men's 4 × 800 metres relay at the 2017 IAAF World Relays held in Nassau, Bahamas.

In 2019, he represented the United States in The Match Europe v USA where he won the bronze medal in the mixed 1600 metres medley relay event and he finished in 5th place in the men's 800 metres event. In the same year, he also competed in the men's 800 metres event at the 2019 World Athletics Championships held in Doha, Qatar. He qualified to compete in the semi-finals and he did not advance to compete in the final.

Kidder was an All-American runner for the Penn State Nittany Lions track and field team, finishing runner-up in the 800 m at the 2015 NCAA Division I Outdoor Track and Field Championships.
