= United States at the World Athletics Relays =

- WA code: USA
- National federation: USA Track & Field
- Website: www.usatf.org
- Medals Ranked 1st: Gold 27 Silver 9 Bronze 2 Total 38

World Athletics Relays appearances (overview)
- 2014; 2015; 2017; 2019; 2024; 2025

United States has competed at the World Athletics Relays since first edition held in 2014, and until edition held in 2025, Americans athletes have won a total of 38 medals, 27 of them gold. They have won the Golden Baton at all but one edition.

== Medals ==
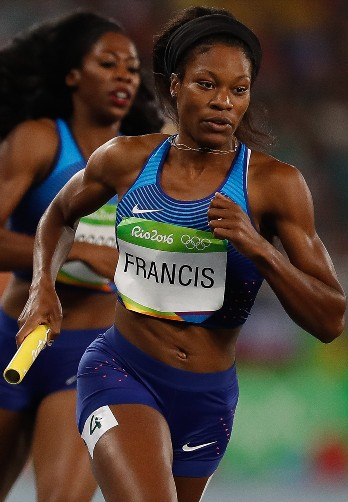
Phyllis Francis two gold medals with 4 × 400 m relay team (2015, 2017).

Americans have won 10 titles in the men's field, 12 in the women's field and 5 in the mixed field.

Multiple wins athletes with three titles are Tony McQuay (4 × 400 m 2014/2015/2017), LaShawn Merritt USA Men's 4 × 400 m 2014/2015/2017), David Verburg USA Men's 4 × 400 m 2014/2015/2017) among men and Natasha Hastings USA Women's 4 × 400 m 2014/2015/2017), Chanelle Price (4 × 800 m 2014/2015/2017), Sanya Richards-Ross (4 × 400 m 2014/2015, Distance Medley Relay 2015) among women.

Edition	1st place, gold medalist(s)	2nd place, silver medalist(s)	3rd place, bronze medalist(s)
(The Bahamas) 2014 Nassau	5	2	1
(The Bahamas) 2015 Nassau	7	1	0
(The Bahamas) 2017 Nassau	5	2	1
(Japan) 2019 Yokohama	5	2	0
(The Bahamas) 2024 Nassau	4	0	0
(China) 2025 Guangzhou	1	2	0
	27	9	2

== Details ==
=== Nassau 2014 ===
Medal	Event
1st place, gold medalist(s)	Men's 4 × 400 m
1st place, gold medalist(s)	Women's 4 × 100 m
1st place, gold medalist(s)	Women's 4 × 200 m
1st place, gold medalist(s)	Women's 4 × 400 m
1st place, gold medalist(s)	Women's 4 × 800 m
2nd place, silver medalist(s)	Men's 4 × 1500 m
2nd place, silver medalist(s)	Women's 4 × 1500 m
3rd place, bronze medalist(s)	Men's 4 × 800 m

=== Nassau 2015 ===
Medal	Event
1st place, gold medalist(s)	Men's 4 × 100 m
1st place, gold medalist(s)	Men's 4 × 400 m
1st place, gold medalist(s)	Men's 4 × 800 m
1st place, gold medalist(s)	Men's distance medley
1st place, gold medalist(s)	Women's 4 × 400 m
1st place, gold medalist(s)	Women's 4 × 800 m
1st place, gold medalist(s)	Women's distance medley relay
2nd place, silver medalist(s)	Women's 4 × 100 m

=== Nassau 2017 ===
Medal	Event
1st place, gold medalist(s)	Men's 4 × 100 m
1st place, gold medalist(s)	Men's 4 × 400 m
1st place, gold medalist(s)	Men's 4 × 800 m
1st place, gold medalist(s)	Women's 4 × 400 m
1st place, gold medalist(s)	Women's 4 × 800 m
2nd place, silver medalist(s)	Men's 4 × 200 m
2nd place, silver medalist(s)	Mixed 4 × 400 m
3rd place, bronze medalist(s)	Women's 4 × 200 m

=== Yokohama 2019 ===
Medal	Event
1st place, gold medalist(s)	Men's 4 × 200 m
1st place, gold medalist(s)	Women's 4 × 100 m
1st place, gold medalist(s)	Mixed 4 × 400 m
1st place, gold medalist(s)	Mixed 2×2×400 m
1st place, gold medalist(s)	Mixed shuttle hurdles
2nd place, silver medalist(s)	Men's 4 × 100 m
2nd place, silver medalist(s)	Women's 4 × 400 m

=== Nassau 2024 ===
Medal	Event
1st place, gold medalist(s)	Men's 4 × 100 m
1st place, gold medalist(s)	Women's 4 × 100 m
1st place, gold medalist(s)	Women's 4 × 400 m
1st place, gold medalist(s)	Mixed 4 × 400 m

=== Guangzhou 2025 ===
Medal	Event
1st place, gold medalist(s)	Mixed 4 × 400 m
2nd place, silver medalist(s)	Men's 4 × 100 m
2nd place, silver medalist(s)	Women's 4 × 400 m

== See also ==
- United States national track and field team
