= 2017 IAAF World Relays – Men's 4 × 800 metres relay =

Men's 4 × 800 metres relay at the 2017 IAAF World Relays
- Venue: Thomas Robinson Stadium
- Dates: 23 April (final)
- Competitors: 28 from 7 nations

Medalists
gold medal	Brannon Kidder; Erik Sowinski; Casimir Loxsom; Clayton Murphy	United States
silver medal	Alfred Kipketer; Kipyegon Bett; Timothy Kitum; Ferguson Cheruiyot Rotich	Kenya
bronze medal	Artur Kuciapski; Mateusz Borkowski; Adam Kszczot; Marcin Lewandowski	Poland

The men's 4 × 800 metres relay at the 2017 IAAF World Relays was held at the Thomas Robinson Stadium on 23 April.

== Records ==
Prior to the competition, the records were as follows:

World record	Kenya (Joseph Mutua, William Yiampoy, Ismael Kombich, Wilfred Bungei)	7:02.43	Brussels, Belgium	25 August 2006
Championship record	United States (Duane Solomon, Erik Sowinski, Casimir Loxsom, Robby Andrews)	7:04.84	(The Bahamas) Nassau, Bahamas	2 May 2015
World Leading	University of Florida	7:18.11	Gainesville, United States	1 April 2017
African Record	Kenya (Joseph Mutua, William Yiampoy, Ismael Kombich, Wilfred Bungei)	7:02.43	Brussels, Belgium	25 August 2006
Asian Record	Qatar (Majed Saeed Sultan, Salem Amer Al-Badri, Abdulrahman Suleiman, Abubaker Ali Kamal)	7:06.66	Brussels, Belgium	25 August 2006
North, Central American and Caribbean record	United States (Jebreh Harris, Khadevis Robinson, Samuel Burley, David Krummenacker)	7:02.82	Brussels, Belgium	25 August 2006
South American Record	No official record			
European Record	Great Britain (Peter Elliott, Garry Cook, Steve Cram, Sebastian Coe)	7:03.89	(United Kingdom) London, Great Britain	30 August 1982
Oceanian record	Australia (Josh Ralph, Ryan Gregson, Jordan Williamsz, Jared West)	7:11.48	(The Bahamas) Nassau, Bahamas	24 May 2014

== Schedule ==
Date	Time	Round
23 April 2017	20:47	Final

All times are local times (UTC-4)

== Results ==
=== Final ===
Rank	Nation	Athletes	Time	Notes	Points
1st place, gold medalist(s)	United States	Brannon Kidder, Erik Sowinski, Casimir Loxsom, Clayton Murphy	7:13.16	WL	8
2nd place, silver medalist(s)	Kenya	Alfred Kipketer, Kipyegon Bett, Timothy Kitum, Ferguson Cheruiyot Rotich	7:13.70	SB	7
3rd place, bronze medalist(s)	Poland	Artur Kuciapski, Mateusz Borkowski, Adam Kszczot, Marcin Lewandowski	7:18.74	SB	6
4	Australia	Josh Ralph, Jordan Williamsz, James Gurr, Luke Mathews	7:20.10	SB	5
5	Mexico	José Eduardo Rodríguez, Alexis Sotelo, Gamaliel Moctezuma, Jesús Tonatiu López	7:20.92	NR	4
6	Qatar	Jamal Hairane, Musaab Adam Ali, Hamza Driouch, Hashim Salah Mohamed	7:28.25	SB	3
7	ART	Gai Nyang, Paulo Amotun, Wiyual Puok, Dominic Lokinyomo Lobalu	8:12.57		2
