= 2015 IAAF World Relays – Men's 4 × 800 metres relay =

Men's 4 × 800 metres relay at the 2014 IAAF World Relays
- Venue: Thomas Robinson Stadium
- Dates: 2 May (final)
- Competitors: 20 from 5 nations
- Winning time: 7:04.84

Medalists
gold medal	Duane Solomon; Erik Sowinski; Casimir Loxsom; Robby Andrews; United States
silver medal	Karol Konieczny; Kamil Gurdak; Marcin Lewandowski; Adam Kszczot; Poland
bronze medal	Jared West; Josh Ralph; Ryan Gregson; Jordan Williamsz; Australia

The men's 4 × 800 metres relay at the 2015 IAAF World Relays was held at the Thomas Robinson Stadium on 2 May.

== Records ==
Prior to the competition, the records were as follows:

World record	Kenya (Joseph Mutua, William Yiampoy, Ismael Kombich, Wilfred Bungei)	7:02.43	Brussels, Belgium	25 August 2006
Championship record	Kenya (Ferguson Cheruiyot Rotich, Sammy Kibet Kirongo, Job Koech Kinyor, Alfred Kipketer)	7:08.40	(The Bahamas) Nassau, Bahamas	24 May 2014
World Leading	Kenya	7:09.1	Nairobi, Kenya	10 April 2015
African Record	Kenya (Joseph Mutua, William Yiampoy, Ismael Kombich, Wilfred Bungei)	7:02.43	Brussels, Belgium	25 August 2006
Asian Record	Qatar (Majed Saeed Sultan, Salem Amer Al-Badri, Abdulrahman Suleiman, Abubaker Ali Kamal)	7:06.66	Brussels, Belgium	25 August 2006
North, Central American and Caribbean record	United States (Jebreh Harris, Khadevis Robinson, Samuel Burley, David Krummenacker)	7:02.82	Brussels, Belgium	25 August 2006
South American Record	No official record			
European Record	Great Britain (Peter Elliott, Garry Cook, Steve Cram, Sebastian Coe)	7:03.89	(United Kingdom) London, Great Britain	30 August 1982
Oceanian record	Australia (Josh Ralph, Ryan Gregson, Jordan Williamsz, Jared West)	7:11.48	(The Bahamas) Nassau, Bahamas	24 May 2014

== Schedule ==
Date	Time	Round
2 May 2015	20:09	Final

All times are local times (UTC-4)

== Summary ==
Kenya's Alfred Kipketer started off fast, chased by USA's Duane Solomon, with Kipketer holding the advantage at the handoff, the 1:47 pace three seconds slower than Kipketer's PR at the time and five seconds slower than Solomon's. Kenya's second runner Nicholas Kipkoech pushed the pace followed by American Erik Sowinski as the two teams separated from the field. With 200 metres to go, Sowinski passed Kipkoech who ran out of gas, Sowinski sprinting the final straightaway to put a 20 metre gap on Kipkoech pulling away. Poland's Kamil Gurdak was also gaining rapidly on Kipkoech. Sowinski's split was a more competitive 1:44.7. Lined up for the handoff, Timothy Kitum became alarmed at his teammate losing ground and bounced backward down the straightaway to grab the baton as Casimir Loxsom sprinted away. Loxsom ran another high 1:44 split to hand off to Robby Andrews with a 35 metre lead, while Poland put their best two runners last, Marcin Lewandowski closing down on Kitum to within 3 metres. Kenya's Jeremiah Mutai took off in chase of Andrews, ignoring Poland's European Champion Adam Kszczot. Over the next 650 metres, Mutai closed down the lead to a manageable 10 metres, but Andrews is a kicker, almost serving as a cruel decoy, Andrews sprinted away from a dejected Mutai to retain the huge lead he had started with. With Kszczot sprinting from behind, Mutai barely crossed the line in second place with Australia a distant fourth.

After the race, Kenya was disqualified for Kitum wandering out of the passing zone. The USA's time of 7:04.84 was also the Championship record.

== Results ==
KEY:	CR	Championship record	SB	Seasonal best

=== Final ===
The final was started at 20:13.

Rank	Lane	Nation	Athletes	Time	Notes
1st place, gold medalist(s)	4	United States	Duane Solomon, Erik Sowinski, Casimir Loxsom, Robby Andrews	7:04.84	CR, WL
2nd place, silver medalist(s)	5	Poland	Karol Konieczny, Kamil Gurdak, Marcin Lewandowski, Adam Kszczot	7:09.98	SB
3rd place, bronze medalist(s)	7	Australia	Jared West, Josh Ralph, Ryan Gregson, Jordan Williamsz	7:16.30	SB
4	3	Mexico	Bryan Martínez, César Daniel Belman, Gamaliel Moctezuma, Omar Rosales	7:22.61	SB
	6	Kenya	Alfred Kipketer, Nicholas Kiplangat Kipkoech, Timothy Kitum, Jeremiah Kipkorir Mutai	DQ	170.19
