= Jamaica at the World Athletics Relays =

- WA code: JAM
- National federation: JAAA
- Website: www.trackandfieldjm.com
- Medals Ranked 1st: Gold 5 Silver 8 Bronze 6 Total 19

World Athletics Relays appearances (overview)
- 2014; 2015; 2017; 2019

Jamaica has competed at the World Athletics Relays since first edition held in 2014, Jamaicans athletes have won a total of 19 medals, 5 of them gold.

== Medals ==
Edition	1st place, gold medalist(s)	2nd place, silver medalist(s)	3rd place, bronze medalist(s)
(The Bahamas) 2014 Nassau	2	2	1
(The Bahamas) 2015 Nassau	2	3	0
(The Bahamas) 2017 Nassau	1	1	4
(Japan) 2019 Yokohama	0	2	1
	5	8	6

== See also ==
- Jamaica Athletics Administrative Association
