= 2014 IAAF World Relays – Men's 4 × 800 metres relay =

Men's 4 × 800 metres relay at the 2014 IAAF World Relays
- Venue: Thomas Robinson Stadium
- Dates: 24 May (final)

The men's 4 × 800 metres relay at the 2014 IAAF World Relays was held at the Thomas Robinson Stadium on 24 May.

At the start of this race Peter Agaba was caught napping, giving up 20 metres to the field. Ferguson Cheruiyot made it clear it was going to be a record attempt, the Kenyan running off the front and making a clear separation from the pack. Kevin López kicked past Michael Rutt to put Spain in second place at the handoff with a strong finish by Shaquille Dill putting Bermuda into the mix. After Cheruiyot's 1:45.8 first leg, Kenya had a 30 metre lead. Job Koech Kinyor took off with similar intent widening the gap to 40 metres, Aaron Evans running in second place for Bermuda. Towards the end of the second leg, the pack bunched behind Evans, with Robby Andrews kicking past everyone to put the USA in second at the handoff. Sammy Kibet Kirongo continued the effort, for the third consecutive leg, the Kenyans running their first lap in times tickling 50 seconds flat and suffering the second lap. Clearly in second place, Brandon Johnson started to close down the gap. Kibet's second lap was indeed painful, his leg ending in an exhausted standing position. Marcin Lewandowski ran around the pack into a clear third place with 300 metres to go in his leg, the Polish team closing down on the second place Americans, still 25 metres behind the Kenyans. World Junior Champion Alfred Kipketer ran his first lap even harder than his teammates, under 50 seconds as if he had the super human ability of his namesake Wilson, the lead again opening up to 40 metres over Duane Solomon, who had future World silver medalist Adam Kszczot on his heels. The reality of running 800 metres came down on Kipketer, his pace slowed noticeably, his huge lead disappearing. As Solomon gained, Kszczot was on his shoulder and running by. Kipketer was flailing trying to will his body the final few metres to the finish. Kipketer made it, with enough every left to hold up his hand in victory. Kszczot was leaning for the finish but was not close enough for it to be effective, but clearly ahead of Solomon. It was a surprisingly close finish with three teams within 2/3 of a second after Kenya had run a time trial, with a huge lead for most of the race.

== Records ==
Prior to the competition, the records were as follows:

World record	Kenya (Joseph Mutua, William Yiampoy, Ismael Kombich, Wilfred Bungei)	7:02.43	Brussels, Belgium	25 August 2006
Championship record	New event			
World Leading	(United States) Villanova University	7:16.58	Philadelphia, United States	26 April 2014
African record	Kenya (Joseph Mutua, William Yiampoy, Ismael Kombich, Wilfred Bungei)	7:02.43	Brussels, Belgium	25 August 2006
Asian record	Qatar (Majed Saeed Sultan, Salem Amer Al-Badri, Abdulrahman Suleiman, Abubaker Ali Kamal)	7:06.66	Brussels, Belgium	25 August 2006
North, Central American and Caribbean record	United States (Jebreh Harris, Khadevis Robinson, Samuel Burley, David Krummenacker)	7:02.82	Brussels, Belgium	25 August 2006
South American record	No official record			
European record	Great Britain (Peter Elliott, Garry Cook, Steve Cram, Sebastian Coe)	7:03.89	(United Kingdom) London, Great Britain	30 August 1982
Oceanian record	New Zealand (Stephen Lunn, Dick Tayler, Stuart Melville, Bruce Hunter)	7:27.2	Dunedin, New Zealand	17 March 1971

== Schedule ==
Date	Time	Round
24 May 2014	18:10	Final

All times are local times (UTC-4)

== Results ==
KEY:	q	Fastest non-qualifiers	Q	Qualified	NR	National record	PB	Personal best	SB	Seasonal best

Rank	Lane	Nation	Athletes	Time	Notes	Points
1st place, gold medalist(s)	2	Kenya	Ferguson Cheruiyot Rotich, Job Koech Kinyor, Sammy Kibet Kirongo, Alfred Kipketer	7:08.40	CR	8
2nd place, silver medalist(s)	1	Poland	Karol Konieczny, Szymon Krawczyk, Marcin Lewandowski, Adam Kszczot	7:08.69	NR	7
3rd place, bronze medalist(s)	8	United States	Michael Rutt, Robby Andrews, Brandon Johnson, Duane Solomon	7:09.06	SB	6
4	3	Australia	Josh Ralph, Ryan Gregson, Jordan Williamsz, Jared West	7:11.48	AR	5
5	5	Spain	Kevin López, Luis Alberto Marco, Alejandro Rodríguez, Francisco Roldán	7:19.90	SB	4
6	8	Mexico	Bryan Martínez, César Daniel Belman, Christopher Sandoval, José María Martínez	7:21.12	NR	3
7	7	Bermuda	Shaquille Dill, Aaron Evans, Lamont Marshall, Trey Simons	7:21.87	NR	2
8	6	Slovakia	Jozef Repčík, Jozef Pelikán, Dušan Páleník, Tomáš Timoranský	7:32.87	NR	1
9	4	Uganda	Peter Agaba, Julius Mutekanga, Peter Okwera, Geoffrey Lukwiya Akena	7:53.34	NR	
