= Erik Sowinski =

American middle-distance runner

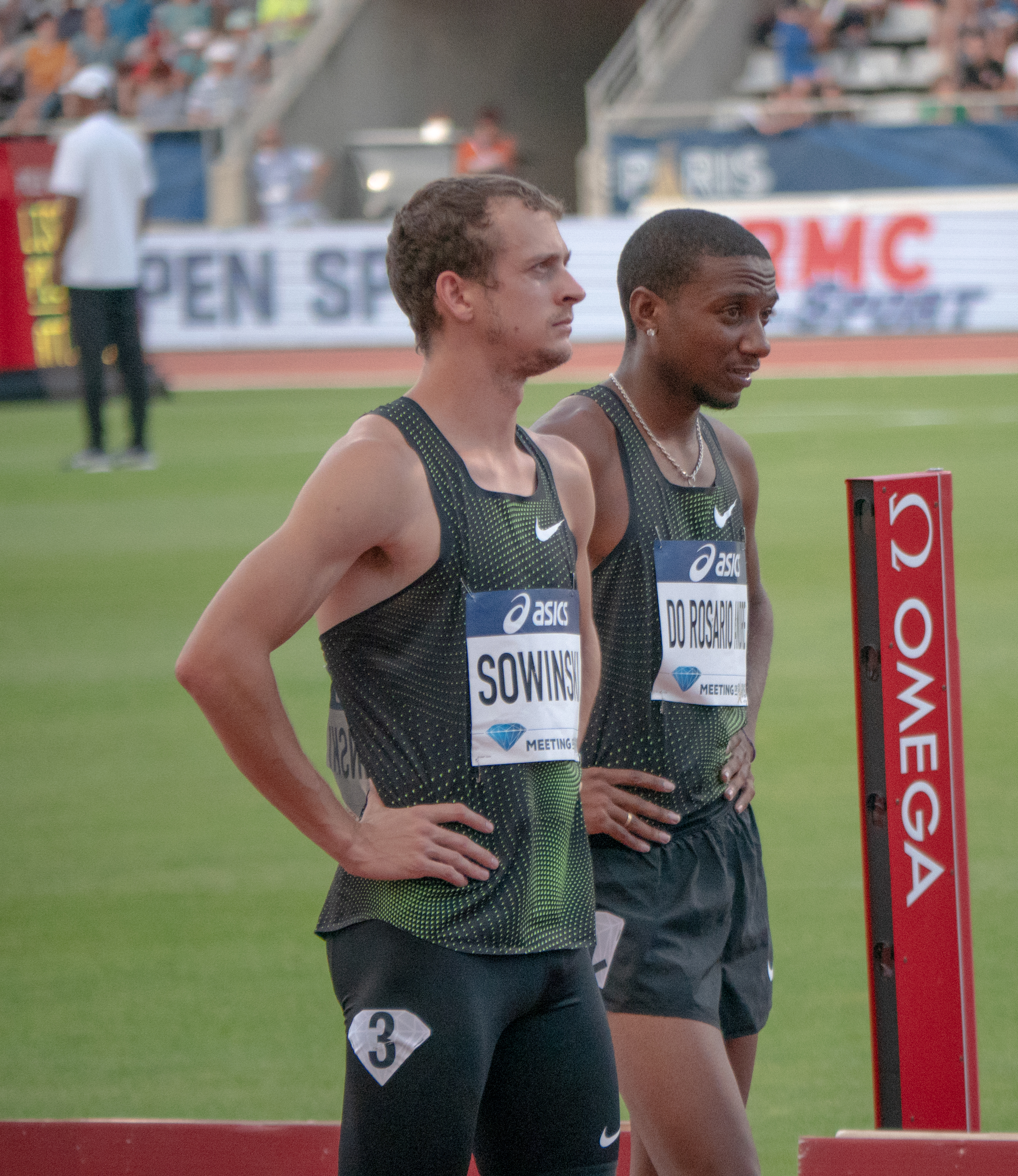
- Sowinski in 2018

Personal information
- Born: December 21, 1989 (age 36) Waukesha, Wisconsin, U.S.

Sport
- Sport: Track and field
- Event: 800 meters
- College team: Iowa Hawkeyes

Achievements and titles
- Personal bests: 400 meters: 46.81; 800 meters: 1:44.58
Medal record
World Indoor Championships
Bronze medal – third place	2016 Portland	800 m
World Relay Championships
Gold medal – first place	2017 Nassau	4×800 m relay
Gold medal – first place	2015 Nassau	4×800 m relay

Erik Sowinski (born December 21, 1989) is an American middle-distance runner, who specializes in the 800 metres. He won a bronze medal in the event at the 2016 World Indoor Championships, and he is a three-time national champion. He also formerly held the American indoor record in the 600 meters. Sowinski has garnered recognition for pacing other athletes to fast times, often in high-profile competitions.

== Early life and career ==
Sowinski was born on December 21, 1989, in Waukesha, Wisconsin, to Bryan and Jane Sowinski. He has two younger siblings, Andy and Emily. Running for Waukesha West High School, Erik won the 800m at the 2008 WIAA Wisconsin State Meet.

In college, Sowinski competed for the University of Iowa from 2009 until 2012. He set his school's 800-meter record at 1:45.90 when he placed second at the 2012 NCAA Division I Outdoor Track and Field Championships. Sowinski accumulated five All-American titles while at University of Iowa.

=== Post-collegiate ===
Following college, Sowinski joined the Iowa City running store sponsored Running Wild, where he was coached by World Championship medalist Joey Woody. During the indoor season of 2013, he entered the Millrose Games 600 metres, where he was expected to be an also-ran behind the more notable Olympians Duane Solomon and Nick Symmonds, who were expecting to chase the American record. Strategically following Duane and the unrelated Jarrin Solomon into the final turn, Sowinski then launched one powerful sprint to the finish, not only winning the prestigious race, but taking the American record in 1:15.61. Three weeks later, he won the 800 metres at the USA Indoor Track and Field Championships, winning in 1:47.09 ahead of a late charge by Robby Andrews. He signed with Nike in May, while continuing to work for the running store.

In 2014 he repeated as national indoor champion, which qualified him to represent the United States internationally at the 2014 IAAF World Indoor Championships in Sopot, Poland, where he placed 13th. At the 2016 Shanghai Diamond League, Erik Sowinski placed 8th in tactical race. At the 2016 World Indoor Championships, he won a bronze medal.

In 2017, he won the gold medal in the men's 4 × 800 metres relay at the 2017 IAAF World Relays held in Nassau, Bahamas. In 2019, Sowinski was also a part of the pacing effort, along with Christian Harrison and Harun Abda, which led to Yomif Kejelcha breaking the Indoor Mile World Record.

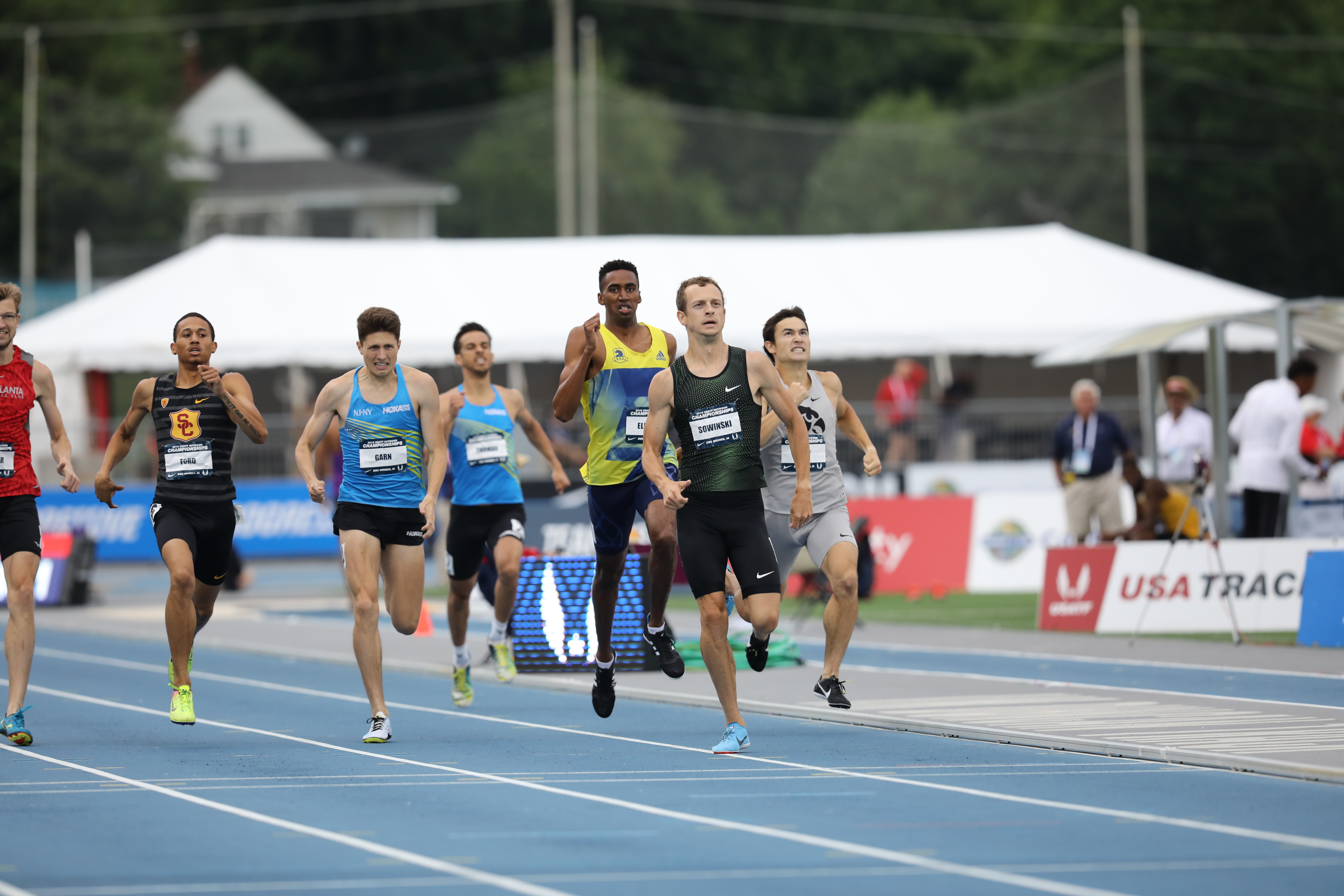
Sowinski (center) competes in the 800 metres at the 2018 USA Outdoor Track and Field Championships.

In 2020, Sowinski switched sponsors from Nike to Brooks where he competed as a member of the Brooks Beasts while maintaining his residence in Iowa City, IA. He placed fourth at the USATF Indoor Championships before the outdoor season was cancelled due to COVID-19. In 2022, Sowinski continued his sponsorship with Bell Lap Elite. On February 17, 2022, Erik paced Olympic Champion Jakob Ingebrigtsen to a new Indoor World Record of 3:30.60. The pacing of other athletes has earned Sowinski praise, with several events requesting his pacing services.

== Achievements ==
Year	Competition	Venue	Position	Event	Notes
Representing United States
2014	World Indoor Championships	Sopot, Poland	13th	800 m	1:48.04
2015	IAAF World Relays	Nassau, Bahamas	1st	4 × 800 m relay	7:04.84
2015	World Championships	Beijing, China	13th (sf)	800 m	1:47.16
2016	World Indoor Championships	Portland, Oregon, United States	3rd	800 m	1:47.22
2017	IAAF World Relays	Nassau, Bahamas	1st	4 × 800 m relay	7:13.16
