= Ben Blankenship =

American middle-distance runner

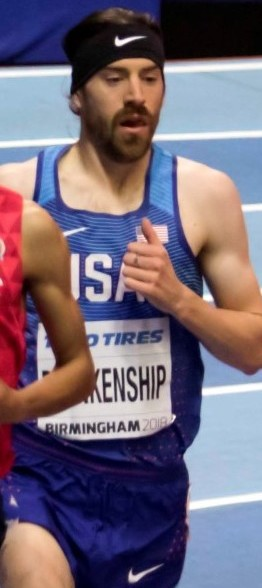
- Blankenship in 2018

Personal information
- Born: December 15, 1988 (age 37) Stillwater, Minnesota, U.S.

Sport
- Sport: Track
- Events: 1500 metres, mile
- College team: Mississippi State; Minnesota

Achievements and titles
- Personal bests: 1500m: 3:34.26; 3000m: 7:38.08
Medal record
Men's athletics
Representing the United States
World Relay Championships
Gold medal – first place	2015 Nassau	Distance Medley Relay

Ben Blankenship (born December 15, 1988) is an American middle distance runner. He is a world record holder as a member of the 2015 USA Distance medley relay team, of which he ran the 1600-meter anchor leg.

== Running career ==
=== Elementary school ===
Blankenship attended St. Croix Catholic school in Stillwater, Minnesota. Classmates from his elementary recall Blankenship to be the fastest runner at St. Croix Catholic when running the mile run at the Old Athletic Field located near the elementary school.

=== High school ===
At Stillwater Area High School, Blankenship was the Minnesota State AA Champion at 1600 meters in both 2006 and 2007. Also in 2005, he led his team to second place in Cross Country. His high school had previously molded other prolific distance runners such as Luke Watson and Sean Graham.

=== Collegiate ===
He began his collegiate career at Mississippi State University. After a year there he transferred to his home state University of Minnesota. By 2010, he became the first Golden Gopher to break the 4 minute mile, when he ran 3:57.83 at the indoor Washington Qualifier meet. In December 2011, his sacrum fractured from his training, and Blankenship made a decision to quit running during his junior year at Minnesota.

=== Post-collegiate ===
After graduating from Minnesota, he moved to Colorado and worked for a friend's excavation company. However, he traveled to London to watch a friend participate in the 2012 Summer Olympics, and became interested in returning to running after he felt his injuries were gone. He subsequently moved to Washington, D.C., where he lived for a year. After working out consistently for the first time since college, he won the 2013 Crystal City Twilighter, a 5K road race, in 15:10. His agent, Stephen Haas, worked to convince Oregon Track Club to invite Blankenship to train professionally in Eugene, and eventually Blankenship accepted the offer.

Both his best 1500 meters and mile personal track records have been set indoors, his 3:53.13 mile set while finishing second in a world class field at the New Balance Indoor Grand Prix in 2015 ranks as the #8 time by an American. His road mile personal best of 3:52.7, set while winning the "Minnesota Mile" is the fastest mile in Minnesota state history.

At the 2015 IAAF World Relays Blankenship put the weight of his team on his shoulders at the end of the distance medley relay. While he received the baton in first place, similar to a move in track cycling strategy, he immediately conceded the lead to Kenyan Timothy Cheruiyot, who in turn broke contact and attempted to run away with the race. Blankenship's even paced lack of aggression also let the Australian team anchor by Collis Birmingham back into contention. When Cheruiyot paid the price for his front running, Blankenship passed the tiring Cheruiyot. But Cheruiyot was not broken and stayed with in contact all the way to the final straightaway where Blankenship's speed put the race away. With the oddly strategic ending, the 0.06 of a second improvement on the existing world record by a Kenyan team in 2006 was more of an accident than a plan.

A month and a half later, at the 2015 USA Outdoor Track and Field Championships, Blankenship finished a disappointing fourth place, .02 behind Leo Manzano, only 0.03 behind second place Robby Andrews who finished with a late rush, to miss making the team for the 2015 World Championships.

He won the 2016 Medtronic TC 1 mile, setting a course record of 3:55.8 and taking home the USATF Road Mile title.

On July 10, 2016, Blankenship finished third in the 1500 meters finals at the 2016 United States Olympic Trials, qualifying him to compete in the 1500 meter race at the 2016 Olympic Games in Rio de Janeiro, Brazil. Blankenship then finished 8th in the Olympic Final.

In September 2017, Blankenship set a record for the fastest 1 mile time in Alaska, achieving a time of 3:57.85. This makes Blankenship one of only two to run a mile in under 4 minutes in Alaska ever, along with Kyle Merber.

Blankenship currently lives in Eugene, Oregon and trains with the Oregon Track Club.

Blankenship won a US national Cross Country title over 10 km in 29:21 at 2018 USATF National Club Cross Country Championships.
