= Jeremiah Kipkorir Mutai =

Kenyan athlete

Personal information
- Born: 27 December 1992 (age 33)

Sport
- Sport: Track and field
- Event: 800 metres

Jeremiah Kipkorir Mutai (born 27 December 1992) is a Kenyan middle-distance runner specialising in the 800 metres. Earlier in his career he competed in the 400 metres hurdles. He represented his country at one outdoor and two indoor World Championships.

== Competition record ==
Year	Competition	Venue	Position	Event	Notes
Representing Kenya
2009	World Youth Championships	Brixen, Italy	2nd	400 m hurdles (84 cm)	51.45
2010	World Junior Championships	Moncton, Canada	24th (sf)	400 m hurdles	55.02
2010	World Junior Championships	Moncton, Canada	13th (h)	4 × 400 m relay	3:12.18
2011	African Junior Championships	Gaborone, Botswana	2nd	400 m hurdles	51.93
2011	African Junior Championships	Gaborone, Botswana	2nd	4 × 400 m relay	3:10.17
2013	World Championships	Moscow, Russia	40th (h)	800 m	1:50.17
2014	World Indoor Championships	Sopot, Poland	10th (h)	800 m	1:47.41
2015	IAAF World Relays	Nassau, Bahamas	–	4 × 800 m relay	DQ
2016	World Indoor Championships	Portland, United States	6th (h)	800 m	1:48.70

== Personal bests ==
Outdoor

- 400 metres – 46.72 (Nairobi 2011)
- 800 metres – 1:44.59 (Nairobi 2013)
- 1000 metres – 2:18.17 (Tomblaine 2014)
- 400 metres hurdles – 51.12 (Nairobi 2010)

Indoor

- 600 metres – 1:16.52 (Glasgow 2014)
- 800 metres – 1:45.93 (Birmingham 2015)
