= Jordan Williamsz =

Australian middle-distance runner (born 1992)

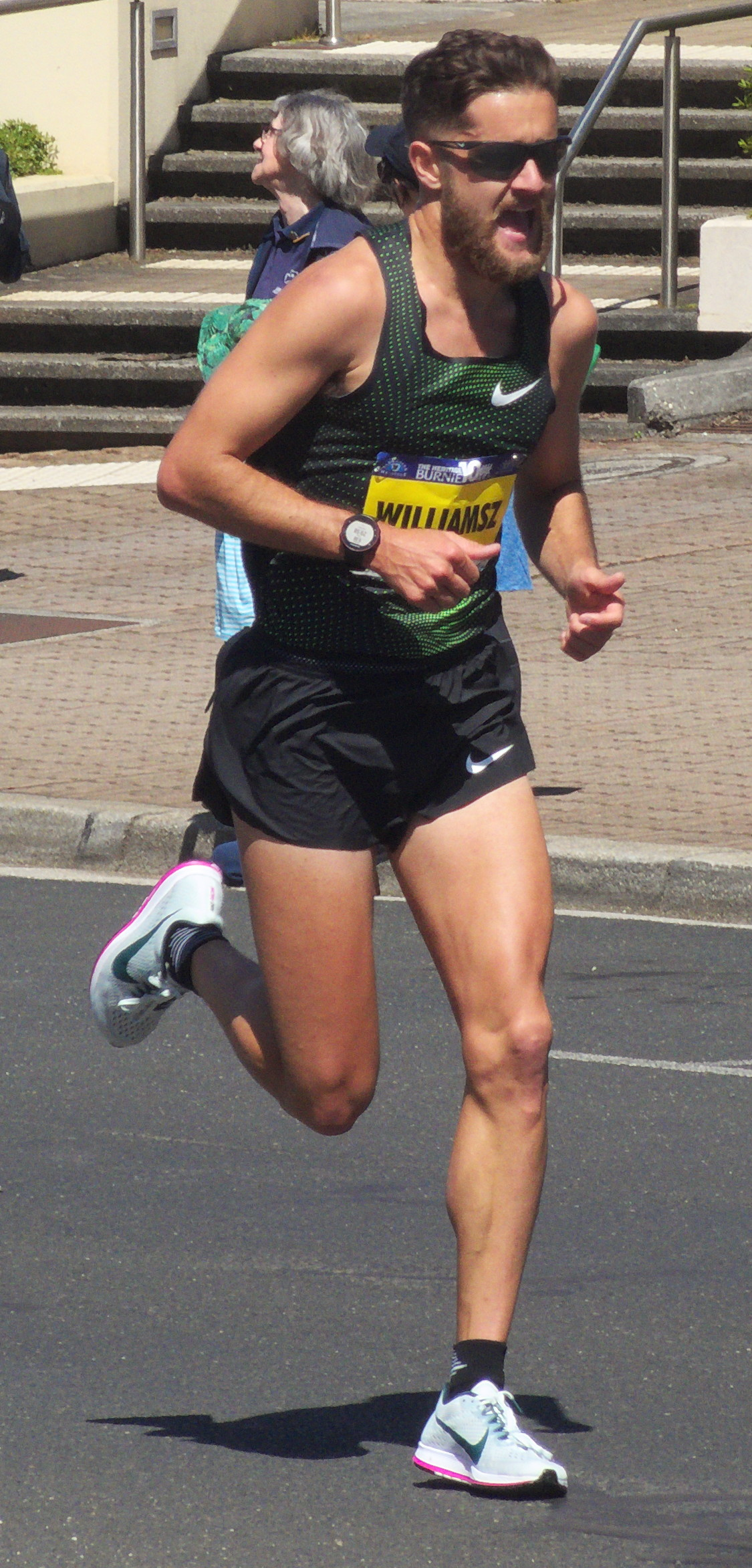
- Williamsz finishing 4th in the 2018 Burnie Ten

Personal information
- Born: 21 August 1992 (age 33) Wantirna, Victoria, Victoria, Australia
- Education: Villanova University
- Height: 1.75 m (5 ft 9 in)
- Weight: 61 kg (134 lb)

Sport
- Sport: Athletics
- Event: 1500 metres
- Coached by: Nic Bideau

Jordan Williamsz (born 21 August 1992) is an Australian middle-distance runner who competes primarily in the 1500 metres. He represented his country at the 2017 World Championships narrowly missing the final. He runs at Melbourne track club with other good runners.

== International competitions ==
| Year | Competition | Venue | Position | Event | Notes |
Representing Australia
| 2009 | World Youth Championships | Brixen, Italy | 11th (sf) | 800 m | 1:52.19 |
| 2009 | World Youth Championships | Brixen, Italy | 7th | Sprint medley relay | 1:55.45 |
| 2014 | World Relays | Nassau, Bahamas | 4th | 4 × 800 m relay | 7:11.48 |
| 2014 | World Relays | Nassau, Bahamas | 4th | 4 × 1500 m relay | 14:46.04 |
| 2015 | World Relays | Nassau, Bahamas | 3rd | 4 × 800 m relay | 7:16.30 |
| 2015 | World Relays | Nassau, Bahamas | 3rd | Distance medley relay | 9:21.62 |
| 2017 | World Relays | Nassau, Bahamas | 8th (sf) | 4 × 800 m relay | 7:20.10 |
| 2017 | World Championships | London, United Kingdom | 8th (sf) | 1500 m | 3:38.93 |
| 2018 | Commonwealth Games | Gold Coast, Australia | 6th | 1500 m | 3:38.34 |

== Personal bests ==
Outdoor

- 800 metres – 1:46.77 (Dublin 2014)
- 1000 metres – 2:19.18 (Linz 2014)
- 1500 metres – 3:36.74 (Swarthmore 2012)
- One mile – 3:56.89 (Birmingham 2017)
- 3000 metres – 8:13.75 (Melbourne 2011)
- 5000 metres – 14:18.05 (Geneva, OH 2016)
- 5 kilometres – 14:12 (Noosa 2017)
- 10 kilometres – 30:18 (Melbourne 2018)

Indoor

- 1500 metres – 3:43.85 (New York 2016)
- One mile – 4:00.18 (State College 2014)
- 3000 metres – 7:59.00 (University Park 2016)
