= Marcin Lewandowski =

Polish middle-distance runner

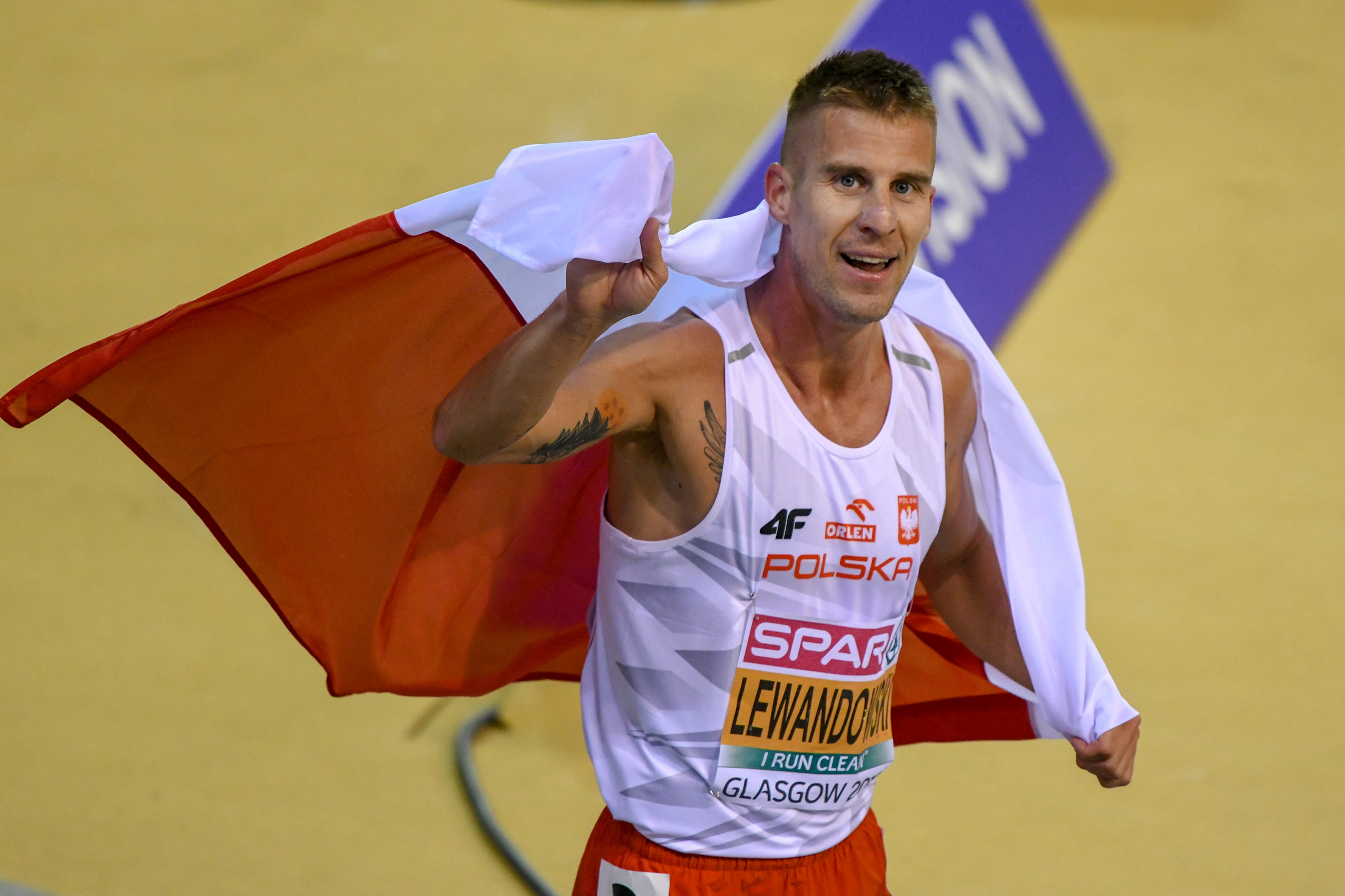
- Lewandowski at the 2019 European Indoor Championships in Glasgow

Personal information
- Born: 13 June 1987 (age 39) Szczecin, Poland
- Height: 1.79 m (5 ft 10 in)
- Weight: 64 kg (141 lb)

Sport
- Country: Poland
- Sport: Athletics
- Event: Middle-distance running
- Club: AZS UMCS Lublin
- Coached by: Tomasz Lewandowski
- Retired: May 2022
Medal record
Men's athletics
Representing Poland
World Championships
Bronze medal – third place	2019 Doha	1500 m
World Indoor Championships
Silver medal – second place	2018 Birmingham	1500 m
World Relays
Silver medal – second place	2014 Nassau	4 × 800 m
Silver medal – second place	2015 Nassau	4 × 800 m
European Championships
Gold medal – first place	2010 Barcelona	800 m
Silver medal – second place	2016 Amsterdam	800 m
Silver medal – second place	2018 Berlin	1500 m
European Indoor Championships
Gold medal – first place	2015 Prague	800 m
Gold medal – first place	2017 Belgrade	1500 m
Gold medal – first place	2019 Glasgow	1500 m
Silver medal – second place	2011 Paris	800 m
Silver medal – second place	2021 Toruń	1500 m
European Team Championships
Gold medal – first place	2019 Bydgoszcz	1500 m
Silver medal – second place	2015 Cheboksary	1500 m
Bronze medal – third place	2010 Bergen	800 m
Bronze medal – third place	2013 Gateshead	1500 m
Bronze medal – third place	2014 Braunschweig	1500 m
European Athletics U23 Championships
Gold medal – first place	2007 Debrecen	800 m
Silver medal – second place	2009 Kaunas	800 m
Representing Europe
Continental Cup
Silver medal – second place	2018 Ostrava	1500 m

Marcin Przemysław Lewandowski (Polish pronunciation: [ˈmart͡ɕin lɛvanˈdɔfski]; born 13 June 1987) is a Polish retired middle-distance runner. He won the bronze medal in the 1500 metres at the 2019 World Athletics Championships and silver in the same event at the 2018 World Indoor Championships. At the European Athletics Championships, Lewandowski claimed gold in the 800 metres in 2010 and silvers in 2016 and 2018 for the 800 m and 1500 m respectively. He took also five medals at the European Indoor Championships, including three golds between 2015 and 2019, and two silvers in 2011 and 2021.

Lewandowski won gold and silver medals in the 800 m at the 2007 and 2009 European Under-23 Championships. He is the Polish record holder for the 1000 m (out and indoor), 1500 m (out and indoor), mile (out and indoor) and 2000 m. He won 14 national titles.

== Personal life ==
Marcin Lewandowski was born in Szczecin in north-western Poland on 13 June 1987. He is a professional soldier in the Polish Army.

He is a graduate of physical education at the University of Szczecin with a masters dissertation titled "Marcin Lewandowski's 800m distance yearly preparation programme" (Polish: Roczny cykl przygotowań Marcina Lewandowskiego na dystansie 800 metrów).

== Running career ==
=== Clubs ===
Lewandowski started his career in 2002 as an unaffiliated athlete. In the beginning he was coached by his brother, and represented Błękitni Osowa Sień. Since 2005 he represented Ósemka Police, and since July 2010 Zawisza Bydgoszcz. He left Zawisza and joined Benfica in Portugal in 2019, and in 2021 he joined AZS UMCS Lublin.

Lewandowski is coached by his brother, Tomasz.

=== Early career ===
Lewandowski finished fourth at the 2006 World Junior Championships, won the 2007 European U23 Championships, and won the silver medal at the 2009 European U23 Championships behind countryfellow Adam Kszczot.

=== Senior career ===
Lewandowski competed at the 2008 Olympic Games without reaching the final, but then finished sixth at the 2009 European Indoor Championships and eighth at the 2009 World Championships. His first medal of 2010 was a bronze, as he was third behind Yuriy Borzakovskiy and Michael Rimmer at the 2010 European Team Championships. Lewandowski won the 800 m at the 2010 European Athletics Championships and took the silver medal behind David Rudisha at the 2010 IAAF Continental Cup.

Lewandowski improved his indoor best to 1:46.17 minutes at the Sparkassen Cup in February 2011, coming third.

In 2017, he won the bronze medal in the men's 4 × 800 metres relay at the 2017 IAAF World Relays held in Nassau, Bahamas.

== Statistics ==
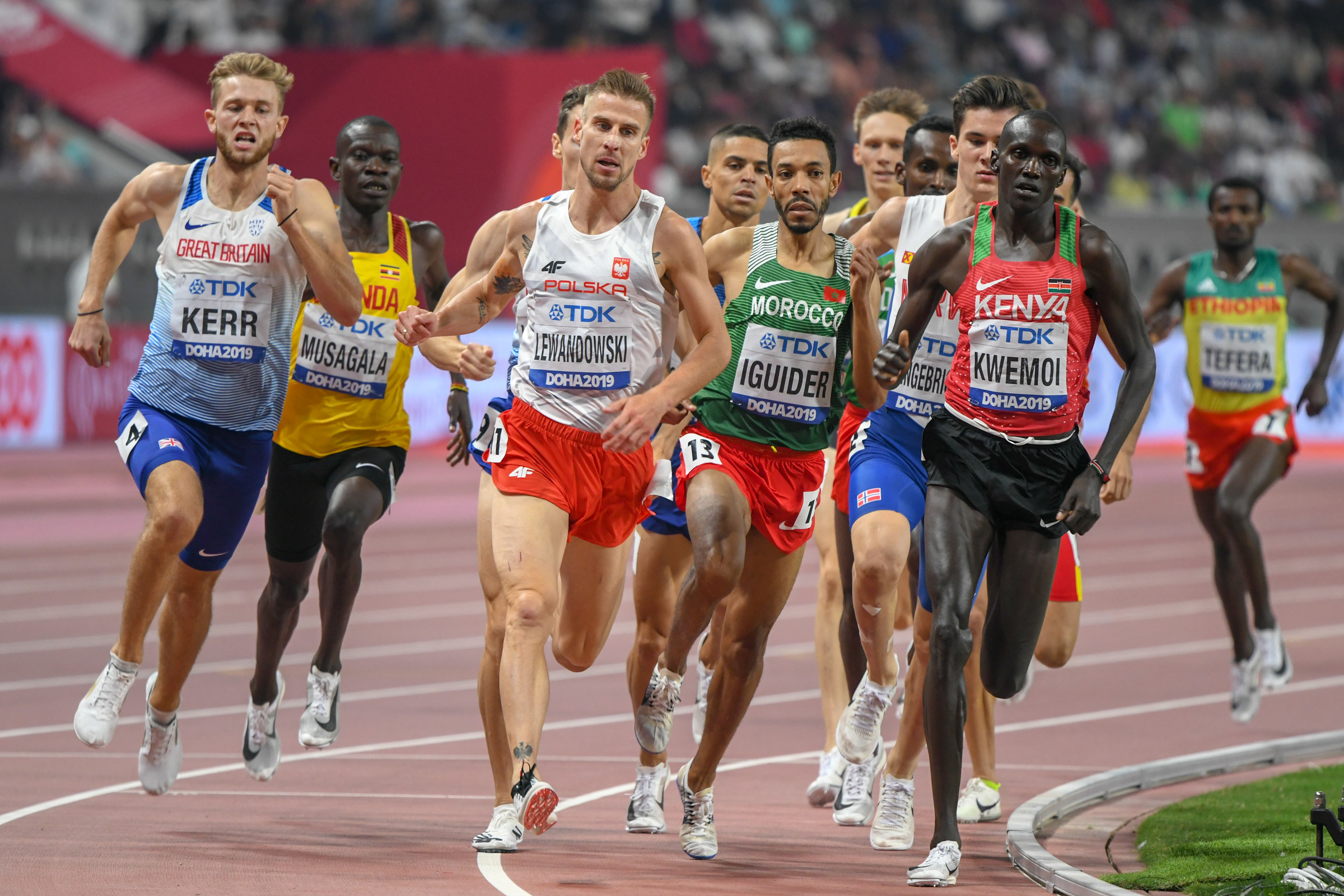
Lewandowski (centre in white & red) won the bronze medal in the 1500 m at the 2019 World Athletics Championships in Doha. Pictured at his semi-final.

=== Personal bests ===
- 800 metres – 1:43.72 (Monaco 2015)
  - 800 metres indoor – 1:45.41 (Birmingham 2012)
- 1000 metres – 2:14.30 (Lausanne 2016) NR
  - 1000 metres indoor – 2:17.67 (Metz 2014) NR
- 1500 metres – 3:30.42 (Monaco 2021) NR
  - 1500 metres indoor – 3:35.71 (Toruń 2021) NR
- Mile – 3:49.11 (Oslo 2021) NR
  - Mile indoor – 3:56.41 (Athlone 2019) NR
  - 3000 metres indoor – 7:51.69 (Toruń 2021)

Road

- Road mile – 3:57.34 (Boston, MA 2019)
- 10 kilometres – 31:26 (Poznań 2021)

=== International competitions ===
Representing Poland
Year	Competition	Venue	Position	Event	Time
2005	European Junior Championships	Kaunas, Lithuania	7th	1500 m	3:49.08
2006	World Cross Country Championships	Fukuoka, Japan	90th	Short race (4 km)	12:03
2006	World Junior Championships	Beijing, China	4th	800 m	1:48.25
2007	European U23 Championships	Debrecen, Hungary	1st	800 m	1:49.94
2007	Universiade	Bangkok, Thailand	8th	800 m	1:47.94
2008	Olympic Games	Beijing, China	20th (sf)	800 m	1:47.24
2009	European Indoor Championships	Turin, Italy	6th	800 m	1:49.86
2009	European U23 Championships	Kaunas, Lithuania	2nd	800 m	1:46.52
2009	World Championships	Berlin, Germany	8th	800 m	1:46.17
2010	European Championships	Barcelona, Spain	1st	800 m	1:47.07
2011	European Indoor Championships	Paris, France	2nd	800 m	1:48.23
2011	World Championships	Daegu, South Korea	4th	800 m	1:44.80
2012	World Indoor Championships	Istanbul, Turkey	– (sf)	800 m	DNF
2012	Olympic Games	London, United Kingdom	9th (sf)	800 m	1:45.08
2013	European Indoor Championships	Gothenburg, Sweden	4th	1500 m	3:39.19
2013	World Championships	Moscow, Russia	4th	800 m	1:44.08
2014	World Indoor Championships	Sopot, Poland	– (f)	800 m	DQ
2014	World Relays	Nassau, Bahamas	2nd	4 × 800 m relay	7:08.69
2014	World Relays	Nassau, Bahamas	6th	4 × 1500 m relay	15:05.70
2014	European Championships	Zürich, Switzerland	5th	800 m	1:45.78
2015	European Indoor Championships	Prague, Czech Republic	1st	800 m	1:46.67
2015	World Relays	Nassau, Bahamas	2nd	4 × 800 m relay	7:09.98
2015	World Relays	Nassau, Bahamas	4th	Distance medley relay	9:24.07 AR
2015	World Championships	Beijing, China	7th (sf)	800 m	1:45.34
2016	European Championships	Amsterdam, Netherlands	2nd	800 m	1:45.54
2016	Olympic Games	Rio de Janeiro, Brazil	6th	800 m	1:44.20
2017	European Indoor Championships	Belgrade, Serbia	1st	1500 m	3:44.82
2017	World Relays	Nassau, Bahamas	3rd	4 × 800 m relay	7:18.74
2017	World Championships	London, United Kingdom	7th (sf)	800 m	1:45.93
2017	World Championships	London, United Kingdom	7th	1500 m	3:36.02
2018	World Indoor Championships	Birmingham, United Kingdom	2nd	1500 m	3:58.39
2018	World Cup	London, United Kingdom	1st	1500 m	3:52.88
2018	European Championships	Berlin, Germany	2nd	1500 m	3:38.14
2019	European Indoor Championships	Glasgow, Scotland	1st	1500 m	3:42.85
2019	World Championships	Doha, Qatar	3rd	1500 m	3:31.46
2021	European Indoor Championships	Toruń, Poland	2nd	1500 m	3:38.06
2021	Olympic Games	Tokyo, Japan	– (sf)	1500 m	DNF

=== National titles ===
- Polish Athletics Championships
  - 800 metres: 2011, 2016, 2018
  - 1500 metres: 2008, 2010, 2014, 2016, 2019, 2021
- Polish Indoor Athletics Championships
  - 800 metres: 2015
  - 1500 metres: 2017, 2018, 2021
  - 3000 metres: 2019
