= Will Leer =

American middle-distance runner

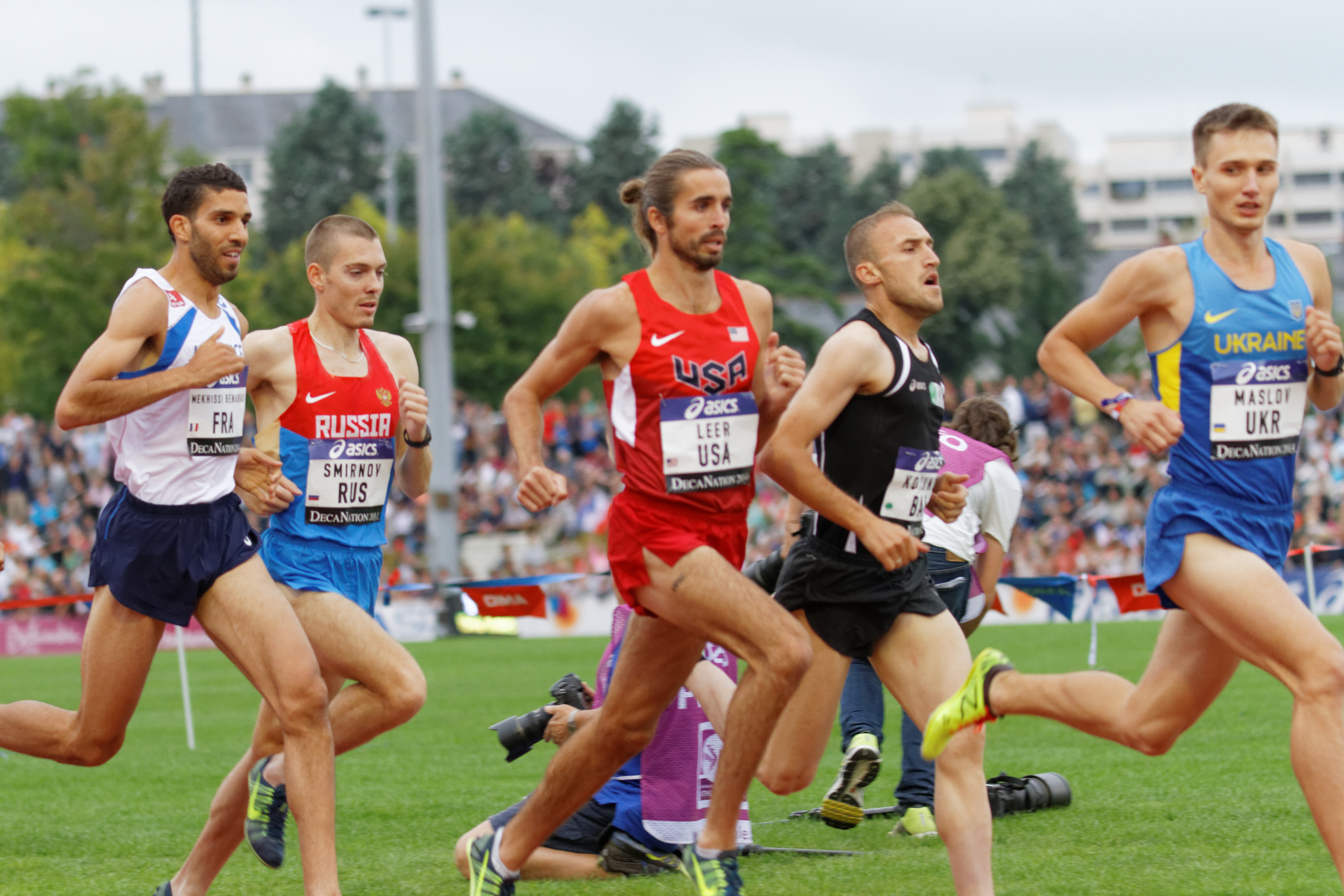
- Leer (in USA singlet) at the 2014 DécaNation

Personal information
- Nationality: American
- Born: April 15, 1985 (age 41) Minnetonka, Minnesota, U.S.

Sport
- Sport: Track
- Events: 1500 meters, Mile, 2-mile, 5000 meters
- College team: Pomona

Achievements and titles
- Personal bests: 800 meters: 1:47.69; 1500 meters: 3:34.26; Mile: 3:51.82; 3000 meters: 7:39.38; 2-mile: 8:19.11; 5000 meters: 13:21.55
Medal record
Men's athletics
Representing the United States
World Relay Championships
Silver medal – second place	2014 Nassau	4×1500 m relay
- Updated on 11-27-14

Will Leer (born 15 April 1985) is an American middle-distance runner. He graduated from Pomona College in Claremont, California in May 2007. Leer has represented the United States in international competition.

== Running career ==
=== High school ===
Will Leer ran track, cross country and played soccer at Minnetonka High School in Minnetonka, Minnesota. He was coached by Jeff Renlund and Chris Cohen. He began running track his sophomore year as a means to stay in shape for soccer in the fall. He quickly found success as a runner. However he did not make the switch to cross country until his senior year when coach Renlund convinced him to run in a few races for the Minnetonka cross country team.

In the 2002 section 6AA championships, Leer finished 11th, missing state qualification by one place. That spring Leer ran a 4:16.41 1600, setting the Minnetonka High School record previously held by his coach. Leer's 1600 time was the 4th fastest time of the year in Minnesota. He also ran a 1:54.64 800, the 5th fastest time in Minnesota. At the state meet he opted to run on the 4x800 team instead of the 1600. He also competed in the open 800, finishing fourth in 1:55.25. His team's 4x800 relay team ran 7:58.87 and finished eighth in a deep field which included nine sub-8:00 times.

=== Collegiate ===
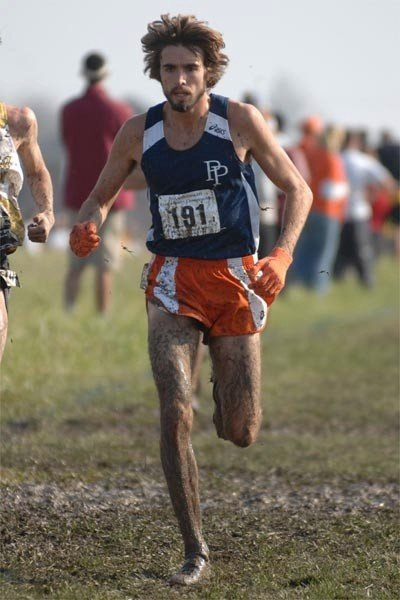
Leer at the 2006 NCAA D-III cross country championships

Leer had a very successful college career running for Pomona College in Claremont, California. In his junior year he finished 90th at cross country nationals with a time of 27:10. After a disappointing performance at cross country nationals, Leer won the NCAA Division-III indoor national title in the mile with a time of 4:09.42. At outdoor nationals, he placed second in the 1500 behind Nick Symmonds with a time of 3:49.70. He also competed in the 800, finishing eighth with a time of 1:52.82. In Leer's senior year he finished 7th at cross country nationals with a time of 27:03 on a very slow and muddy course. During the indoor season, Leer repeated as national champion in the mile with a time of 4:08.19. Later in the meet he came back in the 5000, finishing third with a time of 14:34.24. During his 2007 outdoor season, Leer ran a 1:50.79 in the 800, 3:41.98 in the 1500, and a 14:23 in the 5000. All of his times put him in the top three of DIII performances. Leer's 1500 performance was perhaps the best run of his collegiate career; his 1500 time of 3:41.98 converts to a 3:59 full mile. At the 2007 NCAA Division III National Championships, Leer won the 1500 and the 5000 on the same day. He is the only male Division III runner ever to win both titles in the same meet.

=== Post-collegiate ===
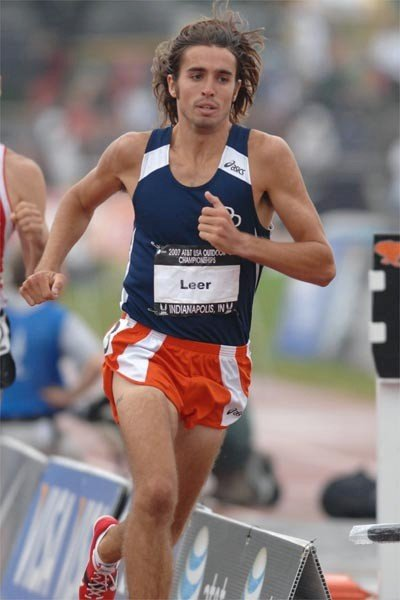
Leer and the 2007 USATF track and field championships

Leer finished 10th in the 1500 meter event at the 2007 USA Outdoor Track & Field Championship meet. He advanced to the June 24 final by running 3:40.06 in a preliminary heat. He qualified for the event by running 3:41.13 at the Prefontaine Classic in June 2007. He also ran a 1:49.37 800m at the USA Outdoor Track & Field West Region Championship meet.

==== 2008 ====
In January 2008, Leer ran a 3:59.83 mile at the UW Indoor Preview for The Oregon Track Club Elite. Leer is the 297th American to break 4-minutes in the mile.

In the winter of 2008, Leer finished fourth in the 1500 meter event at the USA Indoor Track & Field Championships. At historic Hayward Field, the home track of the OTC-Elite, Leer advanced to the final for the 1500 meter event at the U.S. Olympic Trials by finishing third in his semifinal heat. In the finals of the Trials Leer ran 3.41.54, placing him 4th. A few weeks later he set a 1500m personal record by running 3.37.63 in winning a "B" race at Heusden, Belgium.

==== 2009 ====
In 2009, Leer set a personal best in the Mile at the Prefontaine Classic and finished fifth at the 1500m U.S.A. Outdoor Championships in June, then set a 1500m personal best of 3:37.37 at the Ghent Flanders Cup in July.

==== 2010 ====
Leer began his 2010 season with a personal-best 3:55.66 mile at the Boston Indoor Games. A week later, he ran the 1600m anchor leg for the Oregon Track Club team that set In May he lowered his 1500m personal best to 3:37.26, finishing third at the USATF High Performance Meet at Occidental College, California.

==== 2012 ====
In 2012, Leer got his second win in the Morton Games Mile finishing with a 3:56.39 in a race where the first four finishers were all within .1 seconds of each other.

==== 2013 ====
In March 2013 in Albuquerque, NM, Leer won two Indoor National Championships, winning both the 3000m and the mile, the latter with a last minute kick in a race where three runners all broke 4 minutes for the mile, indoors and at elevation.

==== 2014 ====
In June, Leer placed 4th in 1500 meters at USATF Outdoor Championships.

On July 19, Leer ran 3:34.26 in 1500 meters at Heusden-Zolder in Belgium.

==== 2015 ====
In June, Leer was a semifinalist in 1500 meters at USATF Outdoor Championships.

== Personal records ==
- 800 m – 1:47.69
- 1500 m – 3:34.26, 3:41.93i
- Mile – 3:51.82, 3:52.47i
- 3000 m - 7:39.38
- 5000 m – 13:21.55
- 8 km XC – 24:14.1
