= World Athletics Relays =

International biennial track and field sporting event

Wordmark of the World Athletics Relays

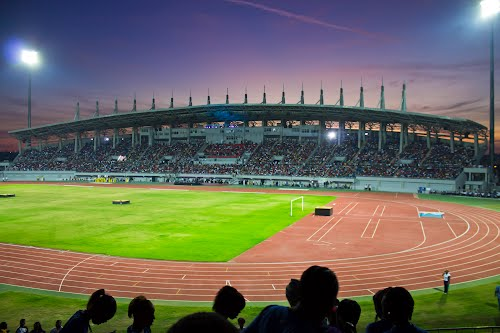
The Tommy Robinson National Stadium in Nassau, Bahamas hosted the first three editions of the competition.

The World Athletics Relays, known as the IAAF World Relays until 2019, is an international biennial track and field sporting event held by World Athletics where teams from around the world compete in relay races, some of which are not part of the standard Olympic programme. The first three editions were set to take place in Nassau, Bahamas at the Thomas Robinson Stadium in 2014, 2015 and 2017. Originally intended as an annual event, it was later decided to happen every odd year, in the same year as the World Athletics Championships for which it serves as a qualification stage.

The competition format for the first edition included the 4 × 100 metres relay, the 4 × 200 metres relay, the 4 × 400 metres relay, the 4 × 800 metres relay and the 4 × 1500 metres relay. The first edition had a $1.4 million prize fund.

From the second edition, the 4 × 1500 metres relay was replaced by the distance medley relay. However, this was short-lived and was itself replaced by a mixed-gender 4 × 400 metres relay for the third edition. In 2019, the 2 × 2 × 400 m relay and the shuttle hurdles relay were added to the mixed-gender category. Starting from the 2024 edition, all the non-Olympic events were removed from the programme and only the mens and women's 4 × 100 and 4 × 400 metres remained, alongside the mixed 4 × 400 metres relay. In the 2025 edition, a mixed 4 × 100 metres was added to the programme, bringing the total to 6 events.

== Championships ==
Ed.	Year	Host city	Host country	Date	Venue	No. of Events	No. of Countries	No. of Athletes	Top of the medal table
1	2014	Nassau	Bahamas	24–25 May	Thomas Robinson Stadium	10	41	470	United States
2	2015	Nassau	Bahamas	2–3 May	Thomas Robinson Stadium	10	42	584	United States
3	2017	Nassau	Bahamas	22–23 April	Thomas Robinson Stadium	9	35	419	United States
4	2019	Yokohama	Japan	11–12 May	Yokohama International Stadium	9	43	529	United States
5	2021	Chorzów	Poland	1–2 May	Silesian Stadium	9	37	689	Italy
6	2024	Nassau	Bahamas	4–5 May	Thomas Robinson Stadium	5	52	893	United States
7	2025	Guangzhou	China	10–11 May	Tianhe Stadium	6	43	734	South Africa
8	2026	Gaborone	Botswana	2–3 May	Botswana National Stadium	6	40	723	Jamaica
9	2028	Nassau	Bahamas	22–23 April	Thomas Robinson Stadium				

== Events ==
Event		Year							
Discipline	Gender	2014	2015	2017	2019	2021	2024	2025	2026
4 × 100 metres relay	Men	✓	✓	✓	✓	✓	✓	✓	✓
4 × 100 metres relay	Mixed	✗	✗	✗	✗	✗	✗	✓	✓
4 × 100 metres relay	Women	✓	✓	✓	✓	✓	✓	✓	✓
Shuttle hurdles relay	Mixed	✗	✗	✗	✓	✓	✗	✗	✗
4 × 200 metres relay	Men	✓	✓	✓	✓	✓	✗	✗	✗
4 × 200 metres relay	Women	✓	✓	✓	✓	✓	✗	✗	✗
4 × 400 metres relay	Men	✓	✓	✓	✓	✓	✓	✓	✓
4 × 400 metres relay	Mixed	✗	✗	✓	✓	✓	✓	✓	✓
4 × 400 metres relay	Women	✓	✓	✓	✓	✓	✓	✓	✓
2 × 2 × 400 metres relay	Mixed	✗	✗	✗	✓	✓	✗	✗	✗
4 × 800 metres relay	Men	✓	✓	✓	✗	✗	✗	✗	✗
4 × 800 metres relay	Women	✓	✓	✓	✗	✗	✗	✗	✗
Distance medley relay	Men	✗	✓	✗	✗	✗	✗	✗	✗
Distance medley relay	Women	✗	✓	✗	✗	✗	✗	✗	✗
4 × 1500 metres relay	Men	✓	✗	✗	✗	✗	✗	✗	✗
4 × 1500 metres relay	Women	✓	✗	✗	✗	✗	✗	✗	✗

== Championships records ==
=== Men ===
Event	Record	Athlete	Nationality	Date	Meet	Place	Ref.
4 × 100 m relay	37.38	Mike Rodgers; Justin Gatlin; Tyson Gay; Ryan Bailey	United States	2 May 2015	2015 IAAF World Relays	Nassau, Bahamas	
4 × 200 m relay	1:18.63	Nickel Ashmeade; Warren Weir; Jermaine Brown; Yohan Blake	Jamaica	24 May 2014	2014 IAAF World Relays	Nassau, Bahamas	
4 × 400 m relay	2:54.47 A	Lee Eppie; Letsile Tebogo; Bayapo Ndori; Collen Kebinatshipi	Botswana	3 May 2026	2026 Relays	Gaborone, Botswana	
4 × 800 m relay	7:04.84	Duane Solomon; Erik Sowinski; Casimir Loxsom; Robby Andrews	United States	3 May 2015	2015 IAAF World Relays	Nassau, Bahamas	
Distance medley relay	9:15.50	Kyle Merber 2:53.56 (1200 m); Brycen Spratling 45.95 (400 m); Brandon Johnson 1:44.75 (800 m); Ben Blankenship 3:51.24 (1600 m)	United States	3 May 2015	2015 IAAF World Relays	Nassau, Bahamas	
4 × 1500 m relay	14:22.22	Collins Cheboi; Silas Kiplagat; James Kiplagat Magut; Asbel Kiprop	Kenya	25 May 2014	2014 IAAF World Relays	Nassau, Bahamas	

=== Women ===
Event	Record	Athlete	Nationality	Date	Meet	Place	Ref.
4 × 100 m relay	41.85	Tamari Davis; Gabrielle Thomas; Celera Barnes; Melissa Jefferson	United States	5 May 2024	2024 Relays	Nassau, Bahamas	
4 × 200 m relay	1:29.04	Jura Levy; Shericka Jackson; Sashalee Forbes; Elaine Thompson	Jamaica	22 April 2017	2017 IAAF World Relays	Nassau, Bahamas	
4 × 400 m relay	3:19.39	Phyllis Francis; Natasha Hastings; Sanya Richards-Ross; Francena McCorory	United States	3 May 2015	2015 IAAF World Relays	Nassau, Bahamas	
4 × 800 m relay	8:00.62	Chanelle Price; Maggie Vessey; Molly Beckwith-Ludlow; Alysia Johnson Montaño	United States	3 May 2015	2015 IAAF World Relays	Nassau, Bahamas	
Distance medley relay	10:36.50	Treniere Moser 3:18.38 (1200 m); Sanya Richards-Ross 50.12 (400 m); Ajee' Wilson 2:00.08 (800 m); Shannon Rowbury 4:27.92 (1600 m)	United States	2 May 2015	2015 IAAF World Relays	Nassau, Bahamas	
4 × 1500 m relay	16:33.58	Mercy Cherono; Faith Kipyegon; Irene Jelagat; Hellen Onsando Obiri	Kenya	24 May 2014	2014 IAAF World Relays	Nassau, Bahamas	

=== Mixed ===
Event	Record	Athlete	Nationality	Date	Meet	Place	Ref.
4 × 100 m relay	39.62 A	Ackeem Blake; Tina Clayton; Kadrian Goldson; Tia Clayton	Jamaica	3 May 2026	2026 Relays	Gaborone, Botswana	
4 × 400 m relay	3:07.47 A	Bryce Deadmon; Paris Peoples; Jenoah McKiver; Bailey Lear	United States	3 May 2026	2026 Relays	Gaborone, Botswana	
2 × 2 × 400 m relay	3:36.92	Ce'Aira Brown; Donavan Brazier	United States	11 May 2019	2019 Relays	Yokohama, Japan	
Shuttle hurdle relay	54.96	Christina Clemons; Freddie Crittenden; Sharika Nelvis; Devon Allen	United States	11 May 2019	2019 Relays	Yokohama, Japan	

== Medal table ==
As of the 2026 edition

Rank	Nation	Gold	Silver	Bronze	Total
1	United States	29	9	3	41
2	Jamaica	7	10	7	24
3	Poland	3	8	1	12
4	Kenya	3	6	3	12
5	Germany	3	1	5	9
6	Italy	3	0	1	4
7	Canada	2	4	3	9
8	South Africa	2	4	1	7
9	Botswana	2	1	2	5
10	France	1	2	2	5
11	Spain	1	2	1	4
12	Bahamas	1	2	0	3
13	Great Britain	1	1	8	10
14	Trinidad and Tobago	1	1	2	4
15	Netherlands	1	1	1	3
16	Brazil	1	1	0	2
17	Nigeria	1	0	1	2
18	Cuba	1	0	0	1
18	Norway	1	0	0	1
20	Japan	0	3	2	5
21	Australia	0	2	7	9
22	Belgium	0	1	3	4
23	China	0	1	2	3
24	Ireland	0	1	1	2
25	Barbados	0	1	0	1
25	Belarus	0	1	0	1
25	Saint Kitts and Nevis	0	1	0	1
28	Denmark	0	0	1	1
28	Dominican Republic	0	0	1	1
28	Ecuador	0	0	1	1
28	Ethiopia	0	0	1	1
28	Portugal	0	0	1	1
28	Russia	0	0	1	1
28	Slovenia	0	0	1	1
Totals (34 entries)		64	64	63	191

== Multiple wins ==
Multiple wins athletes are:

Three wins

Athlete	Country	Events
Nickel Ashmeade	Jamaica	Men's 4 × 100 m 2014, 4 × 200 m 2014/2015
Tony McQuay	United States	Men's 4 × 400 m 2014/2015/2017
LaShawn Merritt	United States	Men's 4 × 400 m 2014/2015/2017
David Verburg	United States	Men's 4 × 400 m 2014/2015/2017
Natasha Hastings	United States	Women's 4 × 400 m 2014/2015/2017
Chanelle Price	United States	Women's 4 × 800 m 2014/2015/2017
Sanya Richards-Ross	United States	Women's 4 × 400 m 2014/2015, Distance Medley Relay 2015

Two wins

Athlete	Country	Events
Yohan Blake	Jamaica	Men's 4 × 100 m 2014, 4 × 200 m 2014
Justin Gatlin	United States	Men's 4 × 100 m 2015/2017
Casimir Loxsom	United States	Men's 4 × 800 m 2015/2017
Erik Sowinski	United States	Men's 4 × 800 m 2015/2017
Warren Weir	Jamaica	Men's 4 × 200 m 2014/2015
Phyllis Francis	United States	Women's 4 × 400 m 2015/2017
Ajeé Wilson	United States	Women's 4 × 800 m 2014, Distance Medley Relay 2015
Quanera Hayes	United States	Women's 4 × 400 m 2017/2024
Gabrielle Thomas	United States	Women's 4 × 100 m 2024, Women's 4 × 400 m 2024
Lynna Irby	United States	Mixed 4 × 400 m 2024/2025
