= Collis Birmingham =

Australian runner (born 1984)

Personal information
- Nicknames: Colonel, Ham
- Nationality: Australian
- Born: 27 December 1984 (age 41) Carlton, Australia
- Occupation: Carpenter
- Height: 189 cm (6 ft 2 in) (2012)
- Weight: 71 kg (157 lb) (2012)

Sport
- Country: Australia
- Sport: Middle and long distance running
- Events: 5,000 and 10,000 metres

Achievements and titles
- Olympic finals: 2008 and 2012
- Updated on 5 February 2014

Collis Birmingham (born 27 December 1984) is an Australian middle- and long-distance runner. He is a two-time participant at the Summer Olympics (2008 and 2012) and four-time participant at the World Championships in Athletics (2009, 2011, 2013 and 2015). He has competed at five editions of the IAAF World Cross Country Championships. He was an Australian and Oceanian 10,000 metres record holder from 2009 to 2011.

== Career ==
Born in Carlton, Victoria, Birmingham made his international debut at the 2003 IAAF World Cross Country Championships, placing 84th in the junior race. His first senior international race came four years later at the 2007 Championships. That year he won his first national title in his debut over the 10,000 metres distance by winning the Zatopek 10K ahead of Martin Dent. At the 2008 IAAF World Cross Country Championships he took 73rd place and he participated in the 2008 Olympic Games in the 5000 metres event but failed to qualify for the final. He came third at the Great Yorkshire Run 10K and made a half marathon debut at the Great North Run, running a time of 65:46 minutes.

The 2009 season saw Birmingham break the Oceanian record for the 10,000 m with a run of 27:29.73 minutes in Berkeley, California. He won the Australian 5000 m title in March, then placed 29th at the 2009 IAAF World Cross Country Championships – his best ever placing at the competition. He came fourth in the Emsley Carr Mile and was selected for both 5000 m and 10,000 m races at the 2009 World Championships in Athletics. He failed to finish the longer race and came 16th in the 5000 m final. Near the end of the year he won his second 10K race at the Zatopek Classic and also placed second at the Great Australian Run, winning the Australian 15K road title.

In 2010, Birmingham ran a 1500 metres best of 3:35.50 minutes, a 3000 metres best of 7:38.77 minutes and a 5000 metres best of 13:10.97 minutes. He was 83rd at the 2010 IAAF World Cross Country Championships and was chosen to represent Oceania in the 5000 m at the 2010 IAAF Continental Cup, where he came sixth. He ran in both 5000 m and 10,000 m events at the 2010 Commonwealth Games in Delhi, finishing sixth and ninth, respectively. He represented Australia at the 2011 World Championships in Athletics, but did not progress beyond the 5000 m heats.

He entered the 2012 New York City Half Marathon and ran the distance in 63:10 minutes. He set three track bests that year, recording 1:49.36 minutes for the 800 metres, 7:35.45 minutes for the 3000 m and 13:09.57 minutes for the 5000 m. His 5000 m best came in a runner-up performance at the London Grand Prix, although he was eliminated in the heats for that event at the 2012 London Olympics a month later. He set his fourth personal best of the year at the Great North Run, reaching seventh place with a time of 61:25 minutes. Birmingham improved this further to 60:56 minutes at the Kagawa Marugame Half Marathon, which he won by a margin of twenty seconds.

In August 2013, Birmingham attended the London Marathon Young Athletes Training Camp at St Mary's University College, Twickenham as a special guest and was interviewed by 80–90 potential future running stars. Other special guests who attended the camp were Andrew Osagie, Ross Murray and Mick Woods.

== Competition record ==
Year	Competition	Venue	Position	Event	Notes
Representing Australia
2008	Olympic Games	Beijing, China	15th (h)	5000m	13:44.90
2009	World Championships	Berlin, Germany	16th	5000m	13:55.58
2009	World Championships	Berlin, Germany	–	10,000m	DNF
2010	Commonwealth Games	Delhi, India	6th	5000m	13:39.59
2010	Commonwealth Games	Delhi, India	9th	10,000m	29:35.65
2011	World Championships	Daegu, South Korea	19th (h)	5000m	13:47.88
2012	Olympic Games	London, United Kingdom	34th (h)	5000m	13:50.39
2013	World Championships	Moscow, Russia	24th	10,000m	28:44.82
2014	World Indoor Championships	Sopot, Poland	10th	3000m	7:57.55
2014	IAAF World Relays	Nassau, Bahamas	4th	4 × 1500 m	14:46.04
2014	Commonwealth Games	Glasgow, Scotland	12th	5000m	13:35.44
2015	IAAF World Relays	Nassau, Bahamas	3rd	Distance medley relay	9:21.62
2015	World Championships	Beijing, China	15th (h)	5000m	13:34.58
2016	World Indoor Championships	Portland, United States	13th (h)	3000 m	7:54.51

== Personal bests ==
- 800m: 1:49.36 (Ballarat 2012)
- 1500m: 3:35.50 (Brussels 2010)
- Mile run: 3:54.30 (London 2009)
- 3000m: 7:35.45 (Stockholm 2012)
- 5000m: 13:09.57 (London 2012)
- 10,000m: 27:29.73 (Berkeley, New South Wales 2009)

== Training ==
Birmingham is currently running 100 miles to 120 miles every week. He currently lives in Australia but comes to England for 6 weeks in the summer to train; often at St Mary's University College, Twickenham in London. Also, he trains at Bushy Park – the second largest of the Royal Parks of London, at 445 hectares (1,100 acres) in area.

Birmingham has trained the 2020 Tokyo Olympic runner, Stewart McSweyne.
