= Patrick Casey (runner) =

American middle-distance runner

Patrick Casey (born May 23, 1990) is an American middle-distance runner. He ran his first four-minute mile on February 4, 2011. He attended Montana State University before transferring to the University of Oklahoma.

== Professional ==
Year	Competition	Venue	Position	Event	Notes
Representing United States
2014	2014 IAAF World Relays	Bahamas	2nd	4 x 1500m	14:40.80
2018	2018 NACAC Championships	Toronto, Canada	2nd	1500 m	3:51.87
USATF Championships
2018	2018 USA Outdoor Track and Field Championships	Des Moines, Iowa	4th	1500 m	3:43.84
2018	2018 USA Road Mile Championships	Des Moines, Iowa	8th	Mile	4:05.1
2017	2017 USA Outdoor Track and Field Championships	Sacramento, California	19th	1500 m	3:43.18
2017	2017 USA Road Mile Championships	Des Moines, Iowa	3rd	Mile	4:00.9
2015	2015 USA Outdoor Track and Field Championships	Eugene, Oregon	12th	1500 m	3:44.38
2015	2015 USA Indoor Track and Field Championships	Boston, Massachusetts	3rd	Mile	4:02.85
2014	2014 USA Outdoor Track and Field Championships	Sacramento, California	2nd	1500 m	3:38.94
2014	2014 USA Road Mile Championships	Des Moines, Iowa	2nd	Mile	4:05.81
2014	2014 USA Indoor Track and Field Championships	Albuquerque, New Mexico	8th	1500 m	3:46.86
2013	2013 USA Outdoor Track and Field Championships	Des Moines, Iowa	13th	1500 m	3:41.70
2011	2011 USA Outdoor Track and Field Championships	Eugene, Oregon	31st	1500 m	3:47.77

== College career ==
One of the NCAA's top milers and 1500m runners, Casey ran a 4:04:44 mile his freshman year, which equates to 3:59.19 after NCAA's altitude-adjustment formula because [Bozeman, Montana] has a 4,800-foot elevation. He ran the first four-minute mile in Montana without altitude-adjustment on February 4, 2011 at 3:59.76. He transferred from Montana State University to the University of Oklahoma in 2012.

Casey finished second in the 1500 m race at the 2014 USA Track & Field Championships.

In 2015, Casey holds the record for the fastest mile run at Montana State University, with a time of 3:54.59.

== High school career ==
Casey attended Laurel High School (Montana), coached by head coaches James Haskins and Lisa Condon. In his senior year, he won the individual title in XC, the 800m, 1600m, and 3200m in the state championships. He currently holds the record in the Montana Mile, one of the flagship events of the Montana State Games, running 4:07.09 in 2010.

== Personal Bests ==
Track	Event	Time (min)	Venue	Date
Outdoor
Outdoor	800 metres	1:48.98	Eugene, Oregon	May 9, 2014
Outdoor	1500 metres	3:35.32	Oordegem, Belgium	July 5, 2014
Outdoor	Mile run	3:52.62	Dublin, Ireland	July 11, 2014
Outdoor	3000 metres steeplechase	9:02.17	Norwalk, USA	April 16, 2011
Outdoor	Mile road	4:05.81	Des Moines, Iowa	April 22, 2014
Outdoor	Distance Medley	9:45.45	Philadelphia	April 27, 2012
Outdoor	4 × 1500 m	14:40.80	Nassau, Bahamas	May 5, 2014
Outdoor	4xMile	16:22.04	Philadelphia	April 28, 2012

Track	Event	Time (min)	Venue	Date
Indoor
Indoor	800 metres	1:47.67	Bozeman, Montana	February 11, 2011
Indoor	1500 metres	3:46.86	Albuquerque, New Mexico, USA	February 23, 2014
Indoor	Mile run	3:56.28	Fayetteville, Arkansas, USA	January 26, 2013
Indoor	3000 metres	8:19.63	Pocatello, USA	February 6, 2010
Indoor	4 × 400 metres relay	3:18.73	Bozeman, Montana	February 4, 2011
