= 2014 IAAF World Relays – Men's 4 × 1500 metres relay =

Men's 4 × 1500 metres relay at the 2014 IAAF World Relays
- Venue: Thomas Robinson Stadium
- Dates: 25 May (final)

The men's 4 × 1500 metres relay at the 2014 IAAF World Relays was held at the Thomas Robinson Stadium on 25 May.

== Records ==
Prior to the competition, the records were as follows:

World record	Kenya (William Biwott Tanui, Gideon Mwangi Gathimba, Geoffrey Kipkoech Rono, Augustine Kiprono Choge)	14:36.23	Brussels, Belgium	4 September 2009
Championship record	New event			
World Leading	No record			
African Record	Kenya (William Biwott Tanui, Gideon Mwangi Gathimba, Geoffrey Kipkoech Rono, Augustine Kiprono Choge)	14:36.23	Brussels, Belgium	4 September 2009
Asian Record	No official record			
North, Central American and Caribbean record	United States	14:46.3	Bourges, France	23 June 1979
South American Record	No official record			
European Record	West Germany (Thomas Wessinghage, Harald Hudak, Michael Lederer, Karl Fleschen)	14:38.8	Cologne, West Germany	17 August 1977
Oceanian record	New Zealand	14:40.4	Oslo, Norway	22 August 1973

== Schedule ==
Date	Time	Round
25 May 2014	18:39	Final

All times are local times (UTC-4)

== Results ==
KEY:	q	Fastest non-qualifiers	Q	Qualified	NR	National record	PB	Personal best	SB	Seasonal best

Rank	Nation	Athletes	Time	Notes	Points
1st place, gold medalist(s)	Kenya	Collins Cheboi, Silas Kiplagat, James Kiplagat Magut, Asbel Kiprop	14:22.22	WR	8
2nd place, silver medalist(s)	United States	Patrick Casey, David Torrence, Will Leer, Leonel Manzano	14:40.80	AR	7
3rd place, bronze medalist(s)	Ethiopia	Mekonnen Gebremedhin, Soresa Fida, Zebene Alemayehu, Aman Wote	14:41.22	NR	6
4	Australia	Ryan Gregson, Sam McEntee, Collis Birmingham, Jordan Williamsz	14:46.04	NR	5
5	Spain	Adel Mechaal, Álvaro Rodríguez, Carlos Alonso, Alberto Imedio	15:00.69	SB	4
6	Poland	Szymon Krawczyk, Mateusz Demczyszak, Marcin Lewandowski, Adam Kszczot	15:05.70	SB	3
7	Qatar	Mohamad Al-Garni, Hashim Salah Mohamed, Maaz Abdelrahman Shagag, Abubaker Ali Kamal	15:10.77	NR	2
