= 2015 IAAF World Relays – Men's distance medley relay =

Men's distance medley relay at the 2015 IAAF World Relays
- Venue: Thomas Robinson Stadium
- Dates: 3 May (final)
- Competitors: 24 from 6 nations
- Winning time: 9:15.50 (WR)

Medalists
gold medal	Kyle Merber; Brycen Spratling; Brandon Johnson; Ben Blankenship; United States
silver medal	Abednego Chesebe Miti; Alphas Kishoyian; Ferguson Cheruiyot Rotich; Timothy Cheruiyot; Kenya
bronze medal	Ryan Gregson; Alexander Beck; Jordan Williamsz; Collis Birmingham; Australia

The men's Distance medley relay at the 2015 IAAF World Relays was held at the Thomas Robinson Stadium on 3 May. This was the first time the event was held at a World Championship level meet. The previous world best, set by a Kenyan team in 2006 at the Penn Relays was elevated to World Record status due to the inclusion of the event in the World Relays. The event takes in a 1200 m leg followed by a 400 m leg, then an 800 m leg before finishing with a 1600 m leg.

In the first leg, Australian Ryan Gregson took it out in 2:53.15 to take a 5-meter lead over American Kyle Merber with Kenya another 7 meters back. Alexander Beck held the lead but Kenya's Alphas Leken Kishoyian gained a half a second on the leading two teams to pull his team back into contention. The 800 metre leg was thrilling as Brandon Johnson quickly passed Jordan Williamsz only to be overtaken by Ferguson Cheruiyot Rotich. Johnson used his best strategic tactics to edge back into the lead by the handoff. But Ben Blankenship had no interest in the lead, literally slowing down and inviting Timothy Cheruiyot to take over. Cheruiyot more than obliged, accelerating to a much faster pace breaking away from Blankenship possibly trying to steal the race while Collis Birmingham brought Australia back into the mix. After a little more than 2 laps, Cheruiyot began to pay the price for his early pace. As he tied up, Blankenship cruised by, but the race wasn't over. Cheruiyot stayed on Blankenship's heels and on the final backstretch, Blankenship showed signs of vulnerability. But coming off the turn, Blankenship had more speed and was able to pull away to the finish line. Setting a new world record, a .06 of a second improvement over the 9-year-old world record was just an after thought.

== Records ==
Prior to the competition, the records were as follows:

World record	KEN (Elkanah Angwenyi, Thomas Musembi, Alfred Yego, Alex Kipchirchir)	9:15.56	Philadelphia, United States	29 April 2006
World Leading	Kenya	9:25.81	Nairobi, Kenya	10 April 2015

== Schedule ==
Date	Time	Round
3 May 2015	20:43	Final

All times are local times (UTC-4)

== Results ==
KEY:	WR	World record	AR	Area record

=== Final ===
The final was started at 20:51.

Rank	Lane	Nation	Athletes	Time	Notes
1st place, gold medalist(s)	6	United States	Kyle Merber, Brycen Spratling, Brandon Johnson, Ben Blankenship	9:15.50	WR
2nd place, silver medalist(s)	3	Kenya	Abednego Chesebe Miti, Alphas Leken Kishoyian, Ferguson Cheruiyot Rotich, Timothy Cheruiyot	9:17.20	
3rd place, bronze medalist(s)	1	Australia	Ryan Gregson, Alexander Beck, Jordan Williamsz, Collis Birmingham	9:21.62	
4	5	Poland	Mateusz Demczyszak, Łukasz Krawczuk, Adam Kszczot, Marcin Lewandowski	9:24.07	
5	4	Germany	Sebastian Keiner, Jonas Plass, Robin Schembera, Florian Orth	9:24.37	
6	2	Papua New Guinea	Andipas Georasi, Paul Pokana, Kevin Kapmatana, George Yamak	10:50.63	
