= 4 × 1500 metres relay =

Athletics track event

The 4 × 1500 metres relay is an athletics track event in which teams comprise four runners who each complete 1500 metres or 3.75 laps on a standard 400 metre track.

While not a World Championship or Olympic event, World Athletics does ratify world records in the event. The men's world record is 14:22.22 by a Kenyan team of Collins Cheboi, Silas Kiplagat, James Magut and Asbel Kiprop, set on May 25, 2014 at the World Relays meet in Nassau, Bahamas. The women's world record is 16:27.02 by an American team of Colleen Quigley, Elise Cranny, Karissa Schweizer and Shelby Houlihan set on July 31, 2020 at the Bowerman Track Club Intrasquad IV meet in Portland, Oregon.

In the United States and other countries, the 4 × mile relay is sometimes run as an alternative.

== All-time top 5 ==
=== Men ===
- Correct as of March 2024.

Rank	Time	Team	Athletes	Split	Date	Place	R
1	14:22.22	Kenya	Collins Cheboi	3:38.5	25 May 2014	World Athletics Relays; Nassau, Bahamas	
1	14:22.22	Kenya	Silas Kiplagat	3:32.4	25 May 2014	World Athletics Relays; Nassau, Bahamas	
1	14:22.22	Kenya	James Magut	3:39.0	25 May 2014	World Athletics Relays; Nassau, Bahamas	
1	14:22.22	Kenya	Asbel Kiprop	3:32.3	25 May 2014	World Athletics Relays; Nassau, Bahamas	
2	14:34.97	Bowerman Track Club 'B'; United States	Evan Jager	3:39.3 e (Note: Estimated from 3:53.921 1600 metres split)	31 Jul 2020	Portland Intrasquad Meet IV; Portland, U.S.	
2	14:34.97	Bowerman Track Club 'B'; United States	Grant Fisher	3:37.6 e (Note: Estimated from 3:52.152 1600-3200 m split)	31 Jul 2020	Portland Intrasquad Meet IV; Portland, U.S.	
2	14:34.97	Bowerman Track Club 'B'; United States	Sean McGorty	3:37.4 e (Note: Estimated from 3:51.926 3200-4800 m split)	31 Jul 2020	Portland Intrasquad Meet IV; Portland, U.S.	
2	14:34.97	Bowerman Track Club 'B'; United States	Lopez Lomong	3:41.2 e (Note: Estimated from 2:56.967 4800-6000 m split)	31 Jul 2020	Portland Intrasquad Meet IV; Portland, U.S.	
3	14:36.23	Kenya	William Biwott Tanui	3:38.5	4 Sep 2009	Memorial Van Damme; Brussels, Belgium	
3	14:36.23	Kenya	Gideon Gathimba	3:39.5	4 Sep 2009	Memorial Van Damme; Brussels, Belgium	
3	14:36.23	Kenya	Geoffrey Rono	3:41.4	4 Sep 2009	Memorial Van Damme; Brussels, Belgium	
3	14:36.23	Kenya	Augustine Choge	3:36.9	4 Sep 2009	Memorial Van Damme; Brussels, Belgium	
4	14:38.8	West Germany	Thomas Wessinghage	3:38.8	17 Aug 1977	Cologne, Germany	
4	14:38.8	West Germany	Harald Hudak	3:40.2	17 Aug 1977	Cologne, Germany	
4	14:38.8	West Germany	Michael Lederer	3:42.6	17 Aug 1977	Cologne, Germany	
4	14:38.8	West Germany	Karl Fleschen	3:37.3	17 Aug 1977	Cologne, Germany	
5	14:40.4	New Zealand	Tony Polhill	3:42.9	22 Aug 1973	Oslo, Norway	(Note: Initially disqualified for the use of pacemakers, but since re-instated.)
5	14:40.4	New Zealand	John Walker	3:40.4	22 Aug 1973	Oslo, Norway	(Note: Initially disqualified for the use of pacemakers, but since re-instated.)
5	14:40.4	New Zealand	Rod Dixon	3:41.2	22 Aug 1973	Oslo, Norway	(Note: Initially disqualified for the use of pacemakers, but since re-instated.)
5	14:40.4	New Zealand	Dick Quax	3:35.9	22 Aug 1973	Oslo, Norway	(Note: Initially disqualified for the use of pacemakers, but since re-instated.)

=== Women ===
- Correct as of March 2024.

Rank	Time	Team	Athletes	Split	Date	Place	R
1	16:27.02	Bowerman Track Club 'A'; United States	Colleen Quigley	4:08	31 Jul 2020	Portland Intrasquad Meet IV; Portland, U.S.	
1	16:27.02	Bowerman Track Club 'A'; United States	Elise Cranny	4:08	31 Jul 2020	Portland Intrasquad Meet IV; Portland, U.S.	
1	16:27.02	Bowerman Track Club 'A'; United States	Karissa Schweizer	4:05	31 Jul 2020	Portland Intrasquad Meet IV; Portland, U.S.	
1	16:27.02	Bowerman Track Club 'A'; United States	Shelby Houlihan	4:04	31 Jul 2020	Portland Intrasquad Meet IV; Portland, U.S.	
2	16:33.58	Kenya	Mercy Cherono	4:07.5	25 May 2014	World Athletics Relays; Nassau, Bahamas	
2	16:33.58	Kenya	Faith Kipyegon	4:08.5	25 May 2014	World Athletics Relays; Nassau, Bahamas	
2	16:33.58	Kenya	Irene Jelagat	4:10.5	25 May 2014	World Athletics Relays; Nassau, Bahamas	
2	16:33.58	Kenya	Hellen Obiri	4:07.1	25 May 2014	World Athletics Relays; Nassau, Bahamas	
3	16:53.87	Arkansas Razorbacks; United States	Isabel Van Camp	4:16.8	30 April 2022	Penn Relays; Philadelphia, U.S.	
3	16:53.87	Arkansas Razorbacks; United States	Logan Morris	4:13.9	30 April 2022	Penn Relays; Philadelphia, U.S.	
3	16:53.87	Arkansas Razorbacks; United States	Lauren Gregory	4:12.5	30 April 2022	Penn Relays; Philadelphia, U.S.	
3	16:53.87	Arkansas Razorbacks; United States	Kristlin Gear	4:10.7	30 April 2022	Penn Relays; Philadelphia, U.S.	
4	16:55.19	NC State Wolfpack; United States	Anna Vess	4:17.2	30 April 2022	Penn Relays; Philadelphia, U.S.	
4	16:55.19	NC State Wolfpack; United States	Sam Bush	4:10.9	30 April 2022	Penn Relays; Philadelphia, U.S.	
4	16:55.19	NC State Wolfpack; United States	Savannah Shaw	4:17.1	30 April 2022	Penn Relays; Philadelphia, U.S.	
4	16:55.19	NC State Wolfpack; United States	Katelyn Tuohy	4:09.8	30 April 2022	Penn Relays; Philadelphia, U.S.	
5	16:55.33	United States	Heather Kampf	4:09.2	25 May 2014	World Athletics Relays; Nassau, Bahamas	
5	16:55.33	United States	Katie Mackey	4:19.4	25 May 2014	World Athletics Relays; Nassau, Bahamas	
5	16:55.33	United States	Kate Grace	4:16.6	25 May 2014	World Athletics Relays; Nassau, Bahamas	
5	16:55.33	United States	Brenda Martinez	4:10.2	25 May 2014	World Athletics Relays; Nassau, Bahamas	
