= Brandon Johnson (runner) =

American middle-distance track athlete

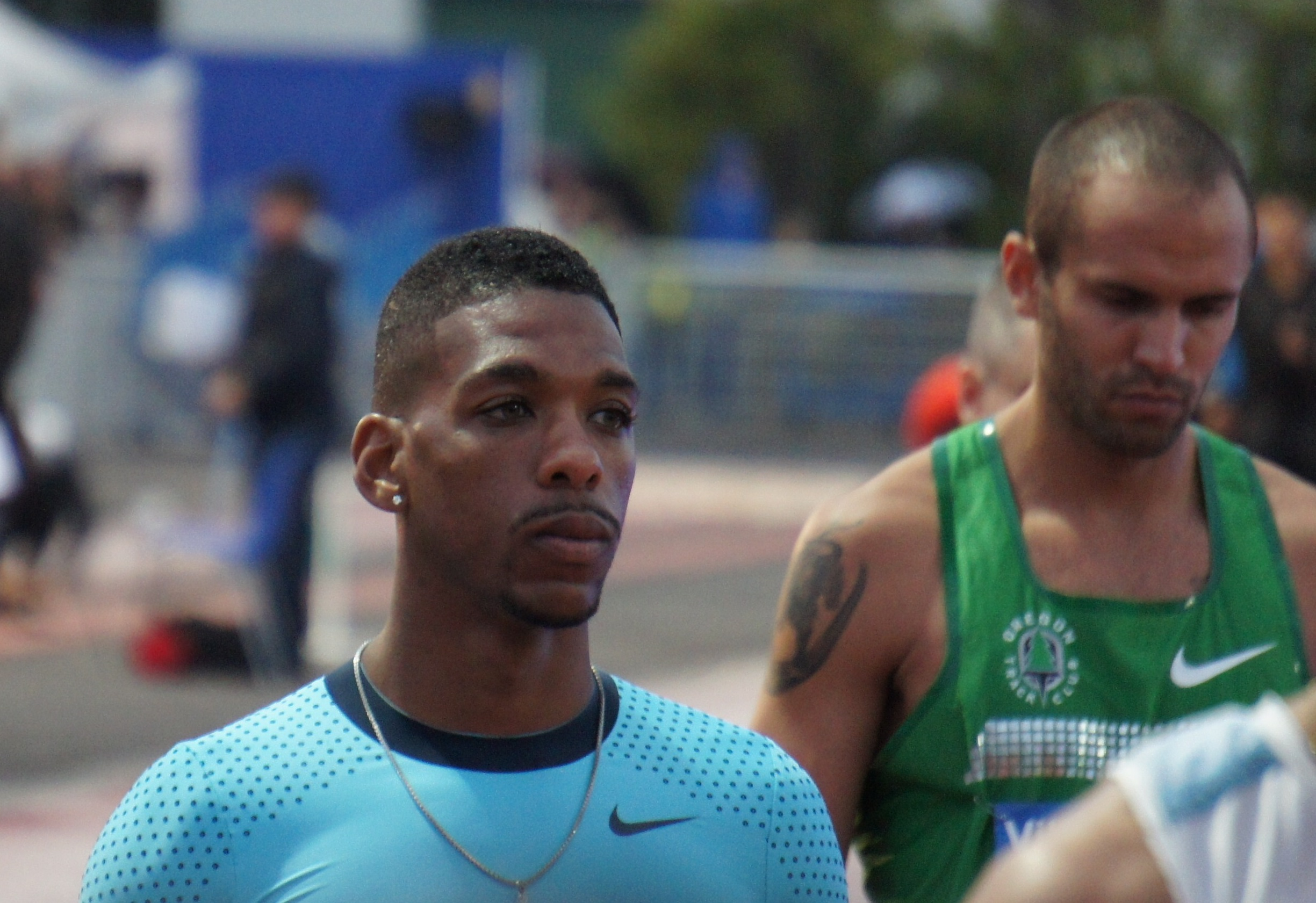
- Johnson in 2013

Personal information
- Nationality: American
- Born: March 2, 1985 (age 41)
- Home town: Orange, Texas, U.S.

Sport
- Sport: Athletics
- Event(s): 400 metres, 400 metres hurdles, 800 metres
- College team: UCLA Bruins

Brandon Johnson (born March 2, 1985) is an American former professional middle-distance runner, who specialized in the 800 metres and previously the 400 meter hurdles until 2012.

== Junior career ==
At the 2004 World Junior Championships in Athletics Johnson won gold as part of the 4 × 400 meter relay team and silver in the 400 meter hurdles.

== College career ==
Johnson was runner-up at the 2007 NCAA Men's Division I Outdoor Track and Field Championships for the UCLA Bruins in the 400 meter hurdles.

== International career ==
At the 2013 USA Outdoor Track and Field Championships Johnson finished 3rd in the 800 m securing a spot at the 2013 World Championships in Athletics where he was a semi-finalist.

He was a member of the United States' distance medley relay team which set the world record of 9:15.50 at the 2015 IAAF World Relays in Nassau.

== Achievements ==
Year	Competition	Venue	Position	Event	Notes
Representing the United States
2004	World Junior Championships	Grosseto, Italy	2nd	400 m hurdles	48.62
2004	World Junior Championships	Grosseto, Italy	1st	4 × 400 m relay	3:01.09
2014	IAAF World Relays	Nassau, Bahamas	3rd	4 × 800 m relay	7:09.06
2015	IAAF World Relays	Nassau, Bahamas	1st	Distance medley relay	9:15.50 (WR)

== Personal bests ==
Outdoor

- 400 metres – 46.34 (Westwood, CA 2005)
- 800 metres – 1:43.84 (Madrid 2013)
- 1000 metres – 2:22.18 (Houston 2016)
- 1500 metres – 3:45.12 (Walnut, CA 2014)
- 400 metres hurdles – 48.59 (Sacramento 2005)

Indoor

- 400 metres – 47.61 (Fayetteville 2006)
- 800 metres – 1:48.27 (Winston Salem 2015)
