= 2015 IAAF World Relays =

Athletics competition in Nassau, Bahamas

IAAF World Relays Bahamas 2015
- Host city: Nassau, Bahamas
- Events: 10
- Dates: 2–3 May 2015
- Main venue: Thomas Robinson Stadium

The 2015 IAAF World Relays was the second edition of the biennial, global track and field relay competition between nations. As in the previous year, it was held in May in Nassau, Bahamas. Apart from contesting for the Golden Baton for the best team overall, the competition also served as a qualifying stage for the 2016 Summer Olympics in the 4 × 100 and 4 × 400 metres relay. One major change compared to the inaugural edition was the replacement of the 4 × 1500 metres relay with the distance medley relay.

== Schedule ==
Day 1 – Saturday 2 May
19:00	Men's 4 × 400 m	Heats
19:29	Women's 4 × 200 m	Heats
19:46	Men's 4 × 100 m	Heats
20:09	Men's 4 × 800 m	Final
20:32	Women's 4 × 400 m	Heats
21:02	Women's distance medley	Final
21:29	Men's 4 × 100 m	Final B
21:36	Women's 4 × 200 m	Final
21:52	Men's 4 × 100 m	Final

Day 2 – Sunday 3 May
19:00	Men's 4 × 200 m	Heats
19:16	Women's 4 × 100 m	Heats
19:39	Women's 4 × 800 m	Final
20:02	Women's 4 × 400 m	Final B
20:12	Women's 4 × 400 m	Final
20:31	Men's distance medley	Final
20:57	Men's 4 × 400 m	Final B
21:06	Men's 4 × 200 m	Final
21:23	Women's 4 × 100 m	Final B
21:30	Women's 4 × 100 m	Final
21:46	Men's 4 × 400 m	Final

== Results ==
=== Men ===
Event	Gold		Silver		Bronze	
4 × 100 metres relay	United States; Mike Rodgers; Justin Gatlin; Tyson Gay; Ryan Bailey	37.38; CR, WL	Jamaica; Nesta Carter; Kemar Bailey-Cole; Nickel Ashmeade; Usain Bolt	37.68	Japan; Kazuma Oseto; Kenji Fujimitsu; Yoshihide Kiryū; Kotaro Taniguchi	38.20
4 × 200 metres relay	Jamaica; Nickel Ashmeade; Rasheed Dwyer; Jason Livermore; Warren Weir	1:20.97	France; Teddy Tinmar; Christophe Lemaitre; Pierre-Alexis Pessonneaux; Ben Bassaw	1:21.49	Germany; Robin Erewa; Sven Knipphals; Aleixo-Platini Menga; Alexander Kosenkow	1:22.65
4 × 400 metres relay	United States; David Verburg; Tony McQuay; Jeremy Wariner; LaShawn Merritt	2:58.43; WL	Bahamas; Ramon Miller; Michael Mathieu; Steven Gardiner; Chris Brown	2:58.91; SB	Belgium; Dylan Borlée; Julien Watrin; Jonathan Borlée; Kevin Borlée	2:59.33; NR
4 × 800 metres relay	United States; Duane Solomon; Erik Sowinski; Casimir Loxsom; Robby Andrews	7:04.84; CR, WL	Poland; Karol Konieczny; Kamil Gurdak; Marcin Lewandowski; Adam Kszczot	7:09.98	Australia; Jared West; Josh Ralph; Ryan Gregson; Jordan Williamsz	7:16.30
Distance medley relay	United States; Kyle Merber; Brycen Spratling; Brandon Johnson; Ben Blankenship	9:15.50; WR	Kenya; Abednego Chesebe Miti; Alphas Kishoyian; Ferguson Cheruiyot Rotich; Timothy Cheruiyot	9:17.20	Australia; Ryan Gregson; Alexander Beck; Jordan Williamsz; Collis Birmingham	9:21.62

=== Women ===
Event	Gold		Silver		Bronze	
4 × 100 metres relay	Jamaica; Simone Facey; Kerron Stewart; Schillonie Calvert; Veronica Campbell-Brown	42.14; WL	United States; Tianna Bartoletta; Allyson Felix; Kimberlyn Duncan; Carmelita Jeter	42.32; SB	Great Britain; Asha Philip; Ashleigh Nelson; Bianca Williams; Margaret Adeoye	42.84; SB
4 × 200 metres relay	Nigeria; Blessing Okagbare; Regina George; Dominique Duncan; Christy Udoh	1:30.52; AR, WL	Jamaica; Samantha Henry-Robinson; Veronica Campbell-Brown; Shericka Williams; Sherone Simpson	1:31.73	Germany; Rebekka Haase; Anne Christina Haack; Nadine Gonska; Josefina Elsler	1:33.61
4 × 400 metres relay	United States; Phyllis Francis; Natasha Hastings; Sanya Richards-Ross; Francena McCorory	3:19.39; CR, WL	Jamaica; Anastasia Le-Roy; Novlene Williams-Mills; Christine Day; Stephenie Ann McPherson	3:22.49; SB	Great Britain; Eilidh Child; Anyika Onuora; Kelly Massey; Seren Bundy-Davies	3:26.38; SB
4 × 800 metres relay	United States; Chanelle Price; Maggie Vessey; Molly Beckwith-Ludlow; Alysia Montaño	8:00.62; CR, AR, WL	Poland; Syntia Ellward; Katarzyna Broniatowska; Angelika Cichocka; Sofia Ennaoui	8:11.36; NR	Australia; Abbey de la Motte; Kelly Hetherington; Selma Kajan; Brittany McGowan	8:13.97; SB
Distance medley relay	United States; Treniere Moser; Sanya Richards-Ross; Ajee' Wilson; Shannon Rowbury	10:36.50; WR	Kenya; Selah Jepleting Busienei; Joy Nakhumicha Sakari; Sylivia Chematui Chesebe; Virginia Nyambura Nganga	10:43.35	Poland; Katarzyna Broniatowska; Monika Szczęsna; Angelika Cichocka; Sofia Ennaoui	10:45.32

== Medal table ==
* Host nation (Bahamas)

Rank	Nation	Gold	Silver	Bronze	Total
1	United States (USA)	7	1	0	8
2	Jamaica (JAM)	2	3	0	5
3	Nigeria (NGR)	1	0	0	1
4	Poland (POL)	0	2	1	3
5	Kenya (KEN)	0	2	0	2
6	Bahamas (BAH)*	0	1	0	1
6	France (FRA)	0	1	0	1
8	Australia (AUS)	0	0	3	3
9	Germany (GER)	0	0	2	2
9	Great Britain (GBR)	0	0	2	2
11	Belgium (BEL)	0	0	1	1
11	Japan (JPN)	0	0	1	1
Totals (12 entries)		10	10	10	30

== Team standings ==
Teams scored for every place in the top 8 with 8 points awarded for the first place, 7 for second, etc. The overall points winner was given the Golden Baton.

The host country is highlighted in lavender blue

Rank	Nation	Points
1	United States	63.0
2	Jamaica	46.0
3	Poland	34.0
4	Australia	25.0
5	Germany	21.0
6	France	19.0
7	Kenya	15.0
8	Great Britain	15.0
9	Brazil	13.0
10	Canada	11.0
10	Bahamas	11.0

== Qualification for 2016 Summer Olympics ==
The top eight-finishers in 4 × 100 and 4 × 400 events gained qualification into the 2016 Olympic Games in Rio de Janeiro. If a team was disqualified, the top team in the B-final would qualify.

#	Men's 4 × 100	Men's 4 × 400	Women's 4 × 100	Women's 4 × 400
1	United States	United States	Jamaica	United States
2	Jamaica	Bahamas	United States	Jamaica
3	Japan	Belgium	Great Britain	Great Britain
4	Brazil	Jamaica	Canada	France
5	France	Brazil	Trinidad and Tobago	Poland
6	Saint Kitts and Nevis	Great Britain	Brazil	Canada
7	Trinidad and Tobago	Trinidad and Tobago	Nigeria	Australia
8	Germany	Botswana	Switzerland	Brazil

The following teams secured a full set of relay places across four events at the 2016 Games:

- Brazil
- United States
- Jamaica

== Participating nations ==
669 athletes from 43 nations are set to take part in the competition.

- Antigua and Barbuda
- Australia
- Bahamas (host)
- Bahrain
- Barbados
- Belgium
- Botswana
- Brazil
- Canada
- Cayman Islands
- China
- Colombia
- Cuba
- Dominican Republic
- Ecuador
- France
- Germany
- Great Britain
- Hong Kong
- Ireland
- Italy
- Jamaica
- Japan
- Kazakhstan
- Kenya
- Mexico
- Namibia
- Netherlands
- Nigeria
- Papua New Guinea
- Poland
- Portugal
- Puerto Rico
- Saint Kitts and Nevis
- Saudi Arabia
- Spain
- Sweden
- Switzerland
- Trinidad and Tobago
- Turkey
- United States
- Venezuela
- United States Virgin Islands

== Records ==
Nation	Athletes	Event	Performance	Type	Date
Barbados	Levi Cadogan; Ramon Gittens; Nicholas Deshong; Mario Burke	Men's 4 × 100 m relay	38.85	NR	2 May
Dominican Republic	Gustavo Cuesta; Yoandry Andujar; Stanly del Carmen; Yancarlos Martínez	Men's 4 × 100 m relay	38.94	NR	2 May
Antigua and Barbuda	Chavaughn Walsh; Daniel Bailey; Tahir Walsh; Miguel Francis	Men's 4 × 100 m relay	39.01	NR	2 May
United States	Duane Solomon; Casimir Loxsom; Robby Andrews; Erik Sowinski	Men's 4 × 800 m relay	7:04.84	CR	2 May
Namibia	Tjipekapora Herunga; Globine Mayova; Mberihonga Kandovasu; Lilianne Klaasman	Women's 4 × 400 m relay	3:41.47	NR	2 May
United States	Sanya Richards-Ross; Treniere Moser; Shannon Rowbury; Ajee' Wilson	Women's distance medley relay	10:36.50	WR	2 May
Barbados	Ramon Gittens; Nicholas Deshong; Levi Cadogan; Mario Burke	Men's 4 × 100 m relay	38.70	NR	2 May
China	Lin Huijun; Yuan Qiqi; Kong Lingwei; Liang Xiaojing	Women's 4 × 200 m relay	1:34.89	AR NR	2 May
Ireland	Amy Foster; Stephanie Creaner; Sarah Lavin; Phil Healy	Women's 4 × 200 m relay	1:36.90	NR	2 May
United States	Justin Gatlin; Ryan Bailey; Tyson Gay; Mike Rodgers	Men's 4 × 100 m relay	37.38	CR	2 May
Canada	Crystal Emmanuel; Kimberly Hyacinthe; Shai-Anne Davis; Khamica Bingham	Women's 4 × 100 m relay	42.94	NR	3 May
Canada	Crystal Emmanuel; Kimberly Hyacinthe; Shai-Anne Davis; Khamica Bingham	Women's 4 × 100 m relay	42.85	NR	3 May
