= Robby Andrews =

American middle-distance runner

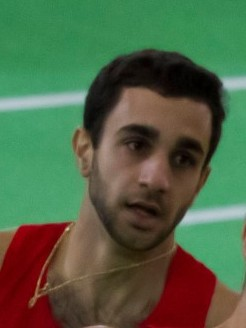
- Robby Andrews in 2016

Personal information
- Nationality: American
- Born: March 29, 1991 (age 35) Manalapan Township, New Jersey, U.S.

Sport
- Sport: Track
- Events: 800 meters, 1500 meters
- College team: Virginia

Achievements and titles
- Personal bests: 800m: 1:44.71; 1500m: 3:34.78; Indoor mile: 3:53.16
Medal record
Men's athletics
Representing the United States
World Relay Championships
| Gold medal – first place | 2015 Nassau | 4×800 m relay |
| Bronze medal – third place | 2014 Nassau | 4×800 m relay |
World Junior Championships
| Bronze medal – third place | 2010 Moncton | 800 m |
- Updated on June 7, 2015

Robert Adrian Andrews (born March 29, 1991) is an American middle distance runner who specializes in the 800 and 1500 meters. While competing with University of Virginia he won the men's 800 meters at the 2011 NCAA Division I Outdoor Track and Field Championships. He is also an Olympian, having qualified for the 2016 Summer Olympics in the 1500 meters, placing second at the 2016 United States Olympic Trials. In 2017, he became a national champion, winning the 1500 meters at the US Outdoor National Championships.

== Running career ==
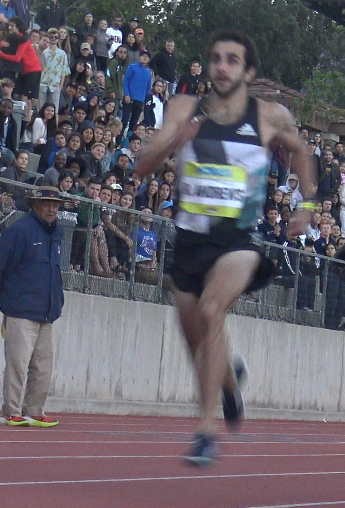
Robby Andrews at the 2016 Hoka One One Middle Distance Classic, at Occidental College, May 10, 2016

=== High school ===
Raised in Manalapan Township, New Jersey, Andrews attended Manalapan High School, graduating in 2009. As a senior in 2009, he set the U.S. high school indoor records for both the 800 m, at 1:49.21, and the 1000 m, at 2:22.28. At the 2010 World Junior Championships in Athletics in Moncton, Canada, Andrews won a bronze medal over 800 m, becoming (along with silver medalist Casimir Loxsom) the first American male to medal in a middle distance event at the world junior championships.

=== Collegiate ===
Andrews competed in the 2010 NCAA Outdoor Track and Field Championships his freshman year, placing second in the 800 m event to Andrew Wheating of Oregon. His more recent achievements include winning the 2011 NCAA Outdoor Track and Field Championship 800-meter race in the second fastest time ever run for an NCAA 800 Championship race, recording a personal best time of 1:44.71 to come from the back of the field and narrowly beat Charles Jock of UC Irvine (1:44.75). Other notable achievements included winning the 800 meters at the 2010 NCAA Indoor Championships, beating out Andrew Wheating on the line.

=== Professional ===
Andrews left University of Virginia in 2012, his junior year, and signed a professional contract with Adidas through 2017. In 2013, he joined the New York New Jersey Track Club and coach Frank Gagliano while keeping Adidas sponsorship. However, after a period of time he decided to leave the New York New Jersey Track Club, favoring a return to his UVA coach Jason Vigilante. He qualified at the 2016 Olympic Trials by kicking into the second qualifying position. Later that year he participated in the 2016 Olympic Games where he was disqualified in the semi-final round for stepping inside of the curb while executing his kick. In the 1500 meters final at the 2017 USA Outdoor Track and Field Championships, he outkicked Olympic gold medalist Matthew Centrowitz Jr. to take first place with a time of 3:43.29, capturing his first-ever national championship.

== Personal best ==
| Distance | Time | Venue |
|---|---|---|
| 800 m | 1:44.71 m | Des Moines, United States (June 10, 2011) |
| 1500 m | 3:34.78 m | Los Angeles, United States (May 18, 2012) |
| Mile | 3:53.16 m | New York City, United States (February 20, 2016) |
