= Josh Ralph (athlete) =

Australian middle-distance runner

Personal information
- Nationality: Australian
- Born: Joshua Ralph; 27 October 1991 (age 35) Sydney, New South Wales
- Education: The University of Sydney
- Years active: 2011-2021

Sport
- Country: Australia
- Sport: Middle-distance running
- Events: 400 and 800 metres
- Coached by: Phil Moore

Achievements and titles
- World finals: 2014 Commonwealth Games; 2018 Commonwealth Games
- Updated on 22 July 2014

Joshua "Josh" Ralph (born 27 October 1991) is an Australian middle-distance runner. He competed in multiple World Athletics Championships, World Relay Championships and Commonwealth Games and is a current Oceanian Record holder in the 4 × 800 m.

== Biography ==
Ralph was born in Sydney and started Little Athletics at North Rocks, New South Wales, when he was nine. He was educated at Newington College where he captained both Athletics and Cross Country teams. In 2013 Ralph won the Balmoral Burn, a charity event created by ex-Wallaby Phil Kearns where participants run 420m up a steep street with a gradient of 14%. In 2014 he studied Exercise and Sport Science at the University of Sydney.

Ralph competed in the 2014 Commonwealth Games in the 800m, but missed the finals, breaking his foot during the heats.

In 2016 he narrowly missed out on selection for the Olympics, despite meeting the qualifying time.

Ralph also competed in the 2018 Commonwealth Games where he ran the 800m and the 4 × 400 m relay. He narrowly missed the final in the 800m, and the 4 × 400 m relay team was disqualified after teammate Steve Solomon lined up in the wrong lane.

Ralph retired from professional athletics in 2021.

== Achievements ==
Year	Competition	Venue	Position	Event	Notes
Representing Australia
2014	Commonwealth Games	Glasgow, Australia	5th (h)	800 m	1:52.48
2018	Commonwealth Games	Gold Coast, Australia	3rd (h)	800 m	1:47.76
2018	Commonwealth Games	Gold Coast, Australia	–	4 × 400 m relay	DQ
