= Alfred Kipketer =

Kenyan middle-distance runner (born 1996)

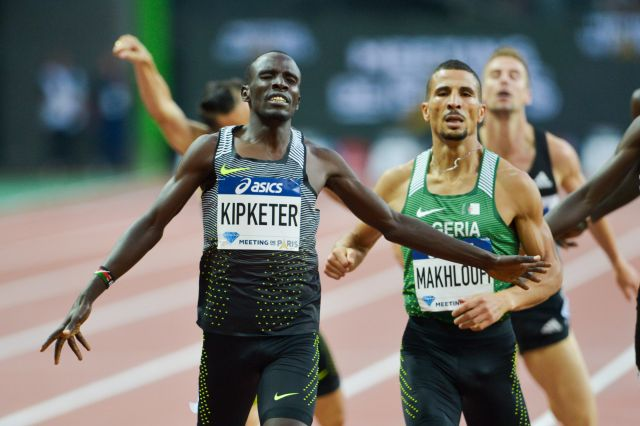
Alfred Kipketer Taoufik Makhloufi Meeting de Paris 2016

== Career ==
He won his first international medal at the 2013 World Youth Championships in Athletics, taking the 800 m gold medal. He completed the first lap in a time of 48.63 seconds – faster than the first lap of David Rudisha's 800 metres world record. He was chosen to run the 4×800 metres relay at the first ever IAAF World Relays in 2014 and running the anchor leg on the Kenyan team with Ferguson Cheruiyot Rotich, Sammy Kibet Kirongo, and Job Koech Kinyor, he won his first senior gold medal. On July 27 at the 2014 World Junior Championships he became World Junior 800 m Champion, effectively leading the race from start to finish.

In 2015, Kipketer was selected onto Kenya's IAAF World Championships team in the 800m. Kipketer made the final, but finished last in 8th place.

In 2016, Kipketer excelled at the 800m winning the Kenyan trials and multiple IAAF Diamond League meeting. Going into the Rio Olympics 800m, Kipketer was one of the favorites aside from his countryman and defending Olympic champion David Rudisha. Kipketer made it into the 2016 Summer Olympics final. Kipketer lead the race through 400m but having gone out at world record pace, only finished in 7th place. Two weeks after the Olympics, Kipketer set his new personal best in 800m in 1:42.87 to win the Paris Diamond League race.

In January 2020, he was provisionally suspended after failing to be available for drug tests on two occasions. In January 2021, he was banned until November 2021 after failing a total of four drug tests over a 12-month period.
