= Ismael Kombich =

Kenyan middle-distance runner

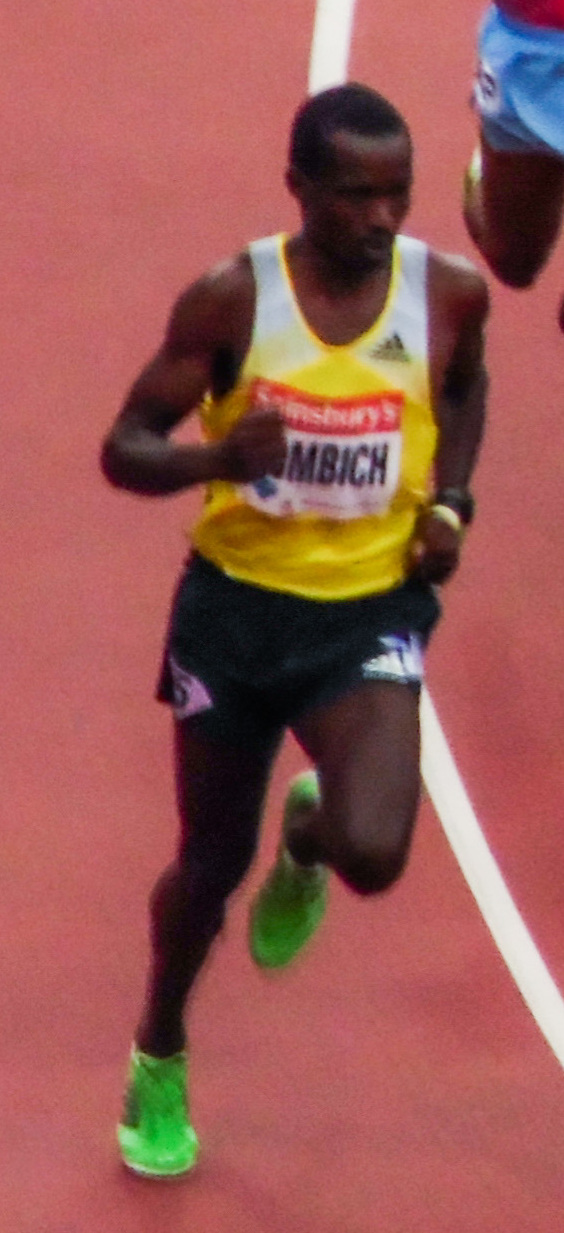
Kombich in 2013

Ismael Kipngetich Kombich (born 16 January 1985) is a Kenyan Track and field athlete who specialised in 800 metres events and was a member of the Kenyan team that currently holds the world record in 4 × 800 metres relay since 2006 with Joseph Mutua, William Yiampoy, and Wilfred Bungei.

Ismael Kombich ran his personal best in the 800 meters in 2008 and won the Kenyan championships in this discipline same year.
