= Duane Solomon =

American middle-distance runner

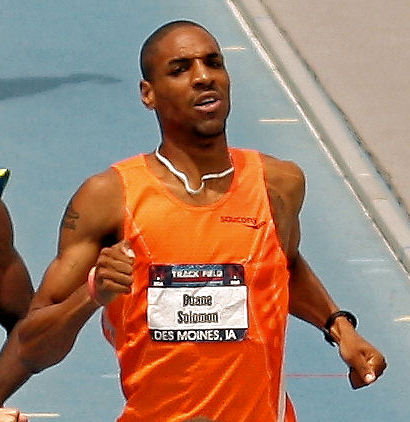
- Solomon at the 2010 USA Outdoor Track and Field Championships

Personal information
- Full name: Duane Renard Solomon
- Born: December 28, 1984 (age 41) Lompoc, California, U.S.
- Height: 6 ft 3 in (191 cm)
- Weight: 170 lb (77 kg)

Sport
- Sport: Track and field
- Event: Middle distances
- College team: USC Trojans

Achievements and titles
- Personal bests: 400 m: 45.98 (Los Angeles 2012); 800 m: 1:42.82 (London 2012); 600 m: 1:13.28 (Vancouver 2013)

Duane Renard Solomon (born December 28, 1984) is a retired American Olympic track athlete, primarily known for racing the 800 meters. He ran for his home country in the IAAF World Championships in 2007 and 2013 as well as in the 2012 Olympic Games. He also took the gold medal at the North American, Central American and Caribbean Under 23 Championships in 2006.

== Prep ==
In high school Solomon was the 2003 CIF California State Champion in the 800 m with a time of 1:49.79, while running for Cabrillo High School (Lompoc, California) under the training of high school coach Peter Anderson. He was named the "2002-03 Gatorade Boys Athlete of the Year."

== USC ==
Solomon ran for the University of Southern California, coached by legend László Tábori. He set his previous Personal Record of 1:45.69 while finishing 3rd at the 2007 USA Outdoor Track and Field Championships. He narrowly missed improving that time running 1:45.71, while finishing 3rd at the 2008 NCAA Championships. A few weeks later he ran a 1:45.78, while finishing 6th at the United States Olympic Trials (track and field). Following USC, Solomon came under the coaching tutelage of American record holder Johnny Gray.

== 2010 ==
In 2010, he made his third international team by finishing second in the USA Indoor Track and Field Championships.

== 2012 ==
On June 25, 2012, Solomon qualified for the 2012 Summer Olympics by finishing third at the 2012 United States Olympic Trials. Going into the race, Solomon had not achieved the A Standard necessary to go to the Olympics. Solomon followed Charles Jock in a first lap under 50 seconds. As Jock faded, Solomon charged into the lead, opening up almost 10 meters on the field. Notable kicker Nicholas Symmonds and veteran Khadevis Robinson (normally a front runner) chased down Solomon, but he held on for third place, .01 behind Robinson. In addition, his time of 1:44.65 surpassed the Olympic A standard, earning him a spot on the US Olympic team for the London games.

In the lead up to the Olympics, Solomon improved his personal best by over a second to 1:43.44 at the Herculis meet in Monaco. While he finished third in the race, he became the fifth fastest in the world to that point in 2012, beating favorites like Symmonds and Abubaker Kaki.

In the 2012 Olympics, he finished fourth behind David Rudisha's world record. In doing so, he again improved his personal best to 1:42.82, which ranked him #28 on the all-time world list, and #2 on the all-time American list at the time.

== 2013 ==
In January 2013, Duane Solomon set the American 600 m indoor record with his 1:15.70 win at the Glasgow International Match.

Solomon won the 2013 USA Outdoor Track and Field Championships in 1:43.27 to qualify for the Moscow World Championships.

Duane qualified to the final of the 14th IAAF World Championships, where he finished 6th in 1:44.42 at Moscow, Russia.

== 2014 ==
Solomon won the 2014 USA Outdoor Track and Field Championships in 1:44.30.

Solomon was the anchor leg of the 4x800m IAAF World relays for the U.S.A. In 2014 which they placed 3rd The time was about 7:08.8

== 2015 ==
Prior to the 2015 National Championships, Solomon announced he would take the race out at world record pace to 600m. Coach Gray refers to that as the "Twilight Zone" but others have personalized it to call it the "Gray Zone." Just as when Gray ran, it can have spectacular or devastating results. This time it failed, a depleted Solomon gave up after being passed by the first three. He walked home in 3:08.74 after almost passing out.

== Achievements ==
Year	Competition	Venue	Position	Event	Notes
Representing United States
2014	IAAF World Relays	Nassau, Bahamas	3rd	4 × 800 m relay	7:09.06
2015	IAAF World Relays	Nassau, Bahamas	1st	4 × 800 m relay	7:04.84
