= Ryan Gregson =

Australian middle-distance runner

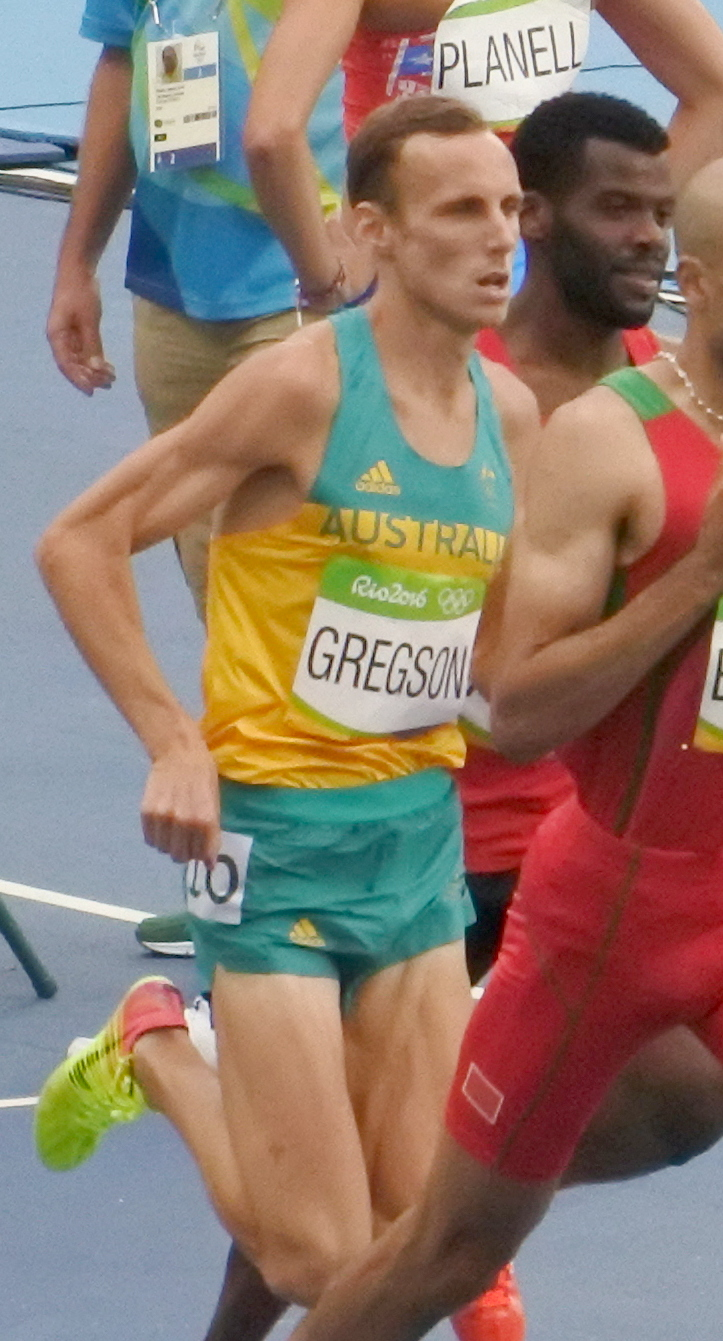
- Gregson at the 2016 Olympics

Personal information
- Nationality: Australian
- Born: 26 April 1990 (age 36) Wollongong, Australia
- Height: 184 cm (6 ft 0 in)
- Weight: 73 kg (161 lb)

Sport
- Sport: Track
- Events: 1500 meters, mile
- Club: Kembla Joggers; NSWIS; Melbourne Track Club
- Coached by: Nic Bideau

Achievements and titles
- Personal bests: 800 meters: 1:46.04; 1500 meters: 3:31.06; Mile: 3:52.24
- Updated on 4–24–15

Ryan Gregory Gregson (born 26 April 1990) is an Australian middle-distance runner. He formerly held the Australian record for the men's 1500 metres now held by Stewart McSweyn.

== Personal life ==
Gregson studied carpentry at TAFE NSW in Wollongong and has a degree in business and marketing from the Swinburne University of Technology. As a teenager he competed nationally in cricket and field hockey. His is married to Olympic runner Genevieve Gregson (née LaCaze) and his cousin Casey Sablowski is an Olympic field hockey player.

== Running career ==
=== Youth ===
Gregson finished 5th in the boys' 1500 metres at the 2007 World Youth Championships in Ostrava. Later that year, he set new Australian youth records over 1500 metres, 3000 metres and 5000 metres, his 3000m clocking of 8:01.26 also eclipsing Craig Mottram's Australian junior record. At the 2008 World Junior Championships in Bydgoszcz he again finished 5th over 1500 metres and also participated in the 5000 metres. In 2009, his last year as a junior, he set new Australian junior records over both 3000 and 1500 metres, with times of 7:57.45 and 3:37.24 respectively.

=== 2009–present ===
Gregson finished 4th in the 1500 metres at the 2009 Summer Universiade in Belgrade, Serbia, missing out on medaling by only 0.22 seconds. Gregson also qualified for the 2009 World Championships in Berlin, Germany, where he again competed in the 1500 metres and was eliminated in the heats.

He captured his first national senior title at the 2010 Australian Championships in Athletics, out-sprinting World Championships semi-finalist Jeff Riseley to win the 1500 metres. Gregson's first appearance in IAAF's brand-new Diamond League was at Eugene's Prefontaine Classic on 3 July, where he won the second-tier International Mile.

Gregson next appeared in a Diamond League race on 24 July, in the Herculis meet at Fontvieille, Monaco. He improved his personal best over 1500 metres by more than four seconds to 3:31.06 and finished 5th, beating among others former World Champion and Olympic medalist Bernard Lagat and breaking Simon Doyle's 19-year-old Australian and Oceanian record. He missed the 2010 Commonwealth Games in October due to a stress fracture to his foot. He did not progress past the first round at the 2014 Commonwealth Games, and finished in 9th at the 2018 Commonwealth Games.

Gregson was eliminated in the semi-finals of the Olympic 1500 m event in 2012, while at the 2016 Olympics he placed ninth in the final. Gregson was the first Australian man in a 1500 meters final in 40 years.
