= 2014 IAAF World Relays =

Athletics competition in Nassau, Bahamas

IAAF World Relays Bahamas 2014
- Host city: Nassau, Bahamas
- Nations: 43
- Athletes: 576
- Events: 10
- Dates: 24–25 May 2014
- Main venue: Thomas Robinson Stadium

The 2014 IAAF World Relays were held in May 2014 in Nassau, Bahamas. The event was the first edition of the IAAF World Relays. There were five events for each gender. In men's and women's 4 × 100 metres and 4 × 400 metres, the event served as a qualification event for the 2015 World Championships in Athletics.

== Schedule ==
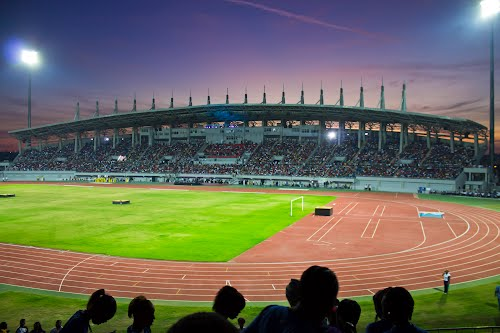
Host stadium in Nassau.

Day 1 – Saturday 24 May
17:30	Men's 4 × 200 m	Round 1
17:47	Women's 4 × 100 m	Round 1
18:10	Men's 4 × 800 m	Final
18:26	Women's 4 × 400 m	Round 1
18:55	Men's 4 × 400 m	Round 1
19:28	Women's 4 × 1500 m	Final
19:52	Men's 4 × 200 m	Final
20:02	Women's 4 × 100 m	Final

Day 2 – Sunday 25 May
17:30	Women's 4 × 200 m	Round 1
17:50	Men's 4 × 100 m	Round 1
18:12	Women's 4 × 400 m	Final
18:39	Men's 4 × 1500 m	Final
19:00	Women's 4 × 800 m	Final
19:21	Men's 4 × 400 m	Final
19:46	Women's 4 × 200 m	Final
20:00	Men's 4 × 100 m	Final

== Results ==
=== Men ===
Event	Gold		Silver		Bronze	
4 × 100 metres relay	Jamaica; Nesta Carter; Nickel Ashmeade; Julian Forte; Yohan Blake	37.77	Trinidad and Tobago; Keston Bledman; Marc Burns; Rondel Sorrillo; Richard Thompson	38.04	Great Britain; Richard Kilty; Harry Aikines-Aryeetey; James Ellington; Dwain Chambers	38.19
4 × 200 metres relay	Jamaica; Nickel Ashmeade; Warren Weir; Jermaine Brown; Yohan Blake	1:18.63; WR	Saint Kitts and Nevis; Antoine Adams; Lestrod Roland; Brijesh Lawrence; Allistar Clarke	1:20.51; NR	France; Christophe Lemaitre; Yannick Fonsat; Ben Bassaw; Ken Romain	1:20.66; AR
4 × 400 metres relay	United States; David Verburg; Tony McQuay; Christian Taylor; LaShawn Merritt	2:57.25	Bahamas; LaToy Williams; Demetrius Pinder; Chris Brown; Michael Mathieu	2:57.59	Trinidad and Tobago; Lalonde Gordon; Renny Quow; Machel Cedenio; Jarrin Solomon	2:58.43; NR
4 × 800 metres relay	Kenya; Ferguson Cheruiyot Rotich; Sammy Kibet Kirongo; Job Koech Kinyor; Alfred Kipketer	7:08.40	Poland; Karol Konieczny; Szymon Krawczyk; Marcin Lewandowski; Adam Kszczot	7:08.69; NR	United States; Michael Rutt; Robby Andrews; Brandon Johnson; Duane Solomon	7:09.06
4 × 1500 metres relay	Kenya; Collins Cheboi; Silas Kiplagat; James Kiplagat Magut; Asbel Kiprop	14:22.22; WR	United States; Patrick Casey; David Torrence; Will Leer; Leonel Manzano	14:40.80; AR	Ethiopia; Mekonnen Gebremedhin; Soresa Fida; Zebene Alemayehu; Aman Wote	14:41.22; NR

=== Women ===
Event	Gold		Silver		Bronze	
4 × 100 metres relay	United States; Tianna Bartoletta; Alexandria Anderson; Jeneba Tarmoh; LaKeisha Lawson	41.88	Jamaica; Carrie Russell; Kerron Stewart; Schillonie Calvert; Samantha Henry-Robinson	42.28	Trinidad and Tobago; Kamaria Durant; Michelle-Lee Ahye; Reyare Thomas; Kai Selvon	42.66
4 × 200 metres relay	United States; Shalonda Solomon; Tawanna Meadows; Bianca Knight; Kimberlyn Duncan	1:29.45	Great Britain; Desirèe Henry; Anyika Onuora; Bianca Williams; Asha Philip	1:29.61; NR	Jamaica; Simone Facey; Sheri-Ann Brooks; Anneisha McLaughlin; Shelly-Ann Fraser-Pryce	1:30.04; NR
4 × 400 metres relay	United States; DeeDee Trotter; Sanya Richards-Ross; Natasha Hastings; Joanna Atkins	3:21.73	Jamaica; Kaliese Spencer; Novlene Williams-Mills; Anastasia Le-Roy; Shericka Jackson	3:23.26	Nigeria; Folasade Abugan; Regina George; Omolara Omotoso; Patience Okon George	3:23.41
4 × 800 metres relay	United States; Chanelle Price; Geena Lara; Ajeé Wilson; Brenda Martinez	8:01.58	Kenya; Janeth Jepkosgei Busienei; Agatha Jeruto Kimaswai; Sylivia Chematui Chesebe; Eunice Jepkoech Sum	8:04.28; AR	Australia (Note: A Russian team of Irina Maracheva, Elena Kobeleva, Tatyana Myazina, and Svetlana Rogozina originally won the bronze medal but were disqualified for doping.); Brittany McGowan; Zoe Buckman; Selma Kajan; Melissa Duncan	8:13.26; AR
4 × 1500 metres relay	Kenya; Mercy Cherono; Faith Kipyegon; Irene Jelagat; Hellen Onsando Obiri	16:33.58; WR	United States; Heather Kampf; Katie Mackey; Kate Grace; Brenda Martinez	16:55.33; AR	Australia; Zoe Buckman; Bridey Delanay; Brittany McGowan; Melissa Duncan	17:08.65; AR

== Medal table ==
* Host nation (Bahamas)

Rank	Nation	Gold	Silver	Bronze	Total
1	United States (USA)	5	2	1	8
2	Kenya (KEN)	3	1	0	4
3	Jamaica (JAM)	2	2	1	5
4	Trinidad and Tobago (TTO)	0	1	2	3
5	Great Britain (GBR)	0	1	1	2
6	Bahamas (BAH)*	0	1	0	1
6	Poland (POL)	0	1	0	1
6	Saint Kitts and Nevis (SKN)	0	1	0	1
9	Australia (AUS)	0	0	1	1
9	Ethiopia (ETH)	0	0	1	1
9	France (FRA)	0	0	1	1
9	Nigeria (NGR)	0	0	1	1
9	Russia (RUS)	0	0	1	1
Totals (13 entries)		10	10	10	30

== Team standings ==
Teams scored for every place in the top 8 with 8 points awarded for the first place, 7 for second, etc. The United States team won the overall classification and was awarded the Golden Baton. No individual medals were awarded although presentations of the first three teams in each event did take place.

The host country is highlighted in lavender blue

Rank	Nation	Points
1	United States	60.0
2	Jamaica	41.0
3	Kenya	35.0
4	Great Britain	24.0
5	Australia	21.0
6	Trinidad and Tobago	19.0
7	France	18.0
8	Bahamas	15.0
9	Poland	14.0
10	Nigeria	13.0
11	Brazil	10.0
12	Spain	8.0
13	Saint Kitts and Nevis	7.0
14	Romania	7.0
15	Russia	6.0
15	Ethiopia	6.0
17	Barbados	5.0
17	Germany	5.0
19	Japan	4.0
19	Cuba	4.0
19	Switzerland	4.0
19	Mexico	4.0
23	Italy	3.0
23	Canada	3.0
23	Venezuela	3.0
26	Bermuda	2.0
26	Qatar	2.0
26	China	2.0
29	Slovakia	1.0

== Qualification for 2015 World Championships ==
The top eight-finishers in 4 × 100 and 4 × 400 events would qualify for the 2015 World Championships in Beijing. If a team was disqualified, the top team in the B-final would qualify.

The following countries qualified teams for all four relays in 2015. :

- Jamaica
- Great Britain
- Brazil

All qualifiers :

#	Men's 4 × 100	Men's 4 × 400	Women's 4 × 100	Women's 4 × 400
1	Jamaica	United States	United States	United States
2	Trinidad and Tobago	Bahamas	Jamaica	Jamaica
3	Great Britain	Trinidad and Tobago	Trinidad and Tobago	Nigeria
4	Brazil	Great Britain	Nigeria	France
5	Japan	Cuba	Great Britain	Poland
6	Canada	Venezuela	Germany	Italy
7	Germany	Brazil	Brazil	Great Britain
8	Ukraine	Jamaica	France	Brazil

== Participating nations ==
43 nations took part in the competition.

- Australia (30)
- Bahamas (28)
- Bahrain (5)
- Barbados (6)
- Belgium (5)
- Bermuda (4)
- Brazil (20)
- British Virgin Islands (5)
- Canada (20)
- Cayman Islands (5)
- China (10)
- Cuba (8)
- Dominican Republic (10)
- Ethiopia (10)
- France (28)
- Germany (17)
- Great Britain (24)
- Italy (5)
- Jamaica (38)
- Japan (17)
- Kenya (28)
- Mexico (9)
- Netherlands (6)
- Nigeria (21)
- Papua New Guinea (5)
- Poland (25)
- Puerto Rico (9)
- Qatar (5)
- Romania (6)
- Russia (14)
- Saint Kitts and Nevis (5)
- Saudi Arabia (6)
- Slovakia (5)
- South Korea (5)
- Spain (15)
- Switzerland (7)
- Trinidad and Tobago (23)
- Turks and Caicos Islands (5)
- Uganda (5)
- Ukraine (5)
- United States (56)
- United States Virgin Islands (5)
- Venezuela (11)
