= List of world records in athletics =

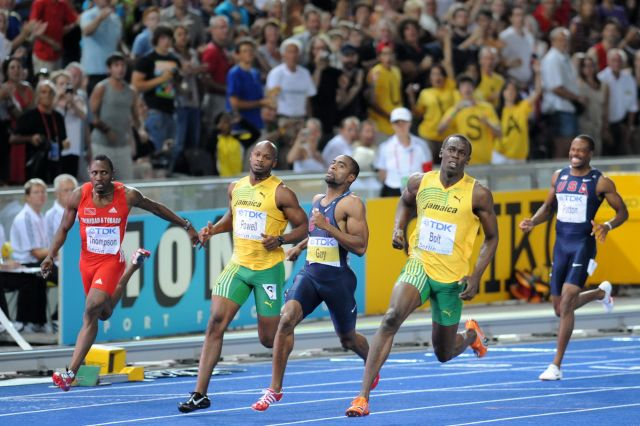
Usain Bolt beating Tyson Gay and setting a 100 m world record at the 2009 World Championships in Athletics in Berlin

World records in athletics are ratified by World Athletics. Athletics records comprise the best performances in the sports of track and field, road running and racewalking.

Records are kept for all events contested at the Olympic Games and some others. Unofficial records for some other events are kept by track and field statisticians. The only non-metric track distance for which official records are kept is the mile run.

== Criteria ==
The criteria which must be satisfied for ratification of a world record are defined by World Athletics in Part III of the Competition Rules. These criteria also apply to national or other restricted records and also to performances submitted as qualifying marks for eligibility to compete in major events such as the Olympic Games.

The criteria include:

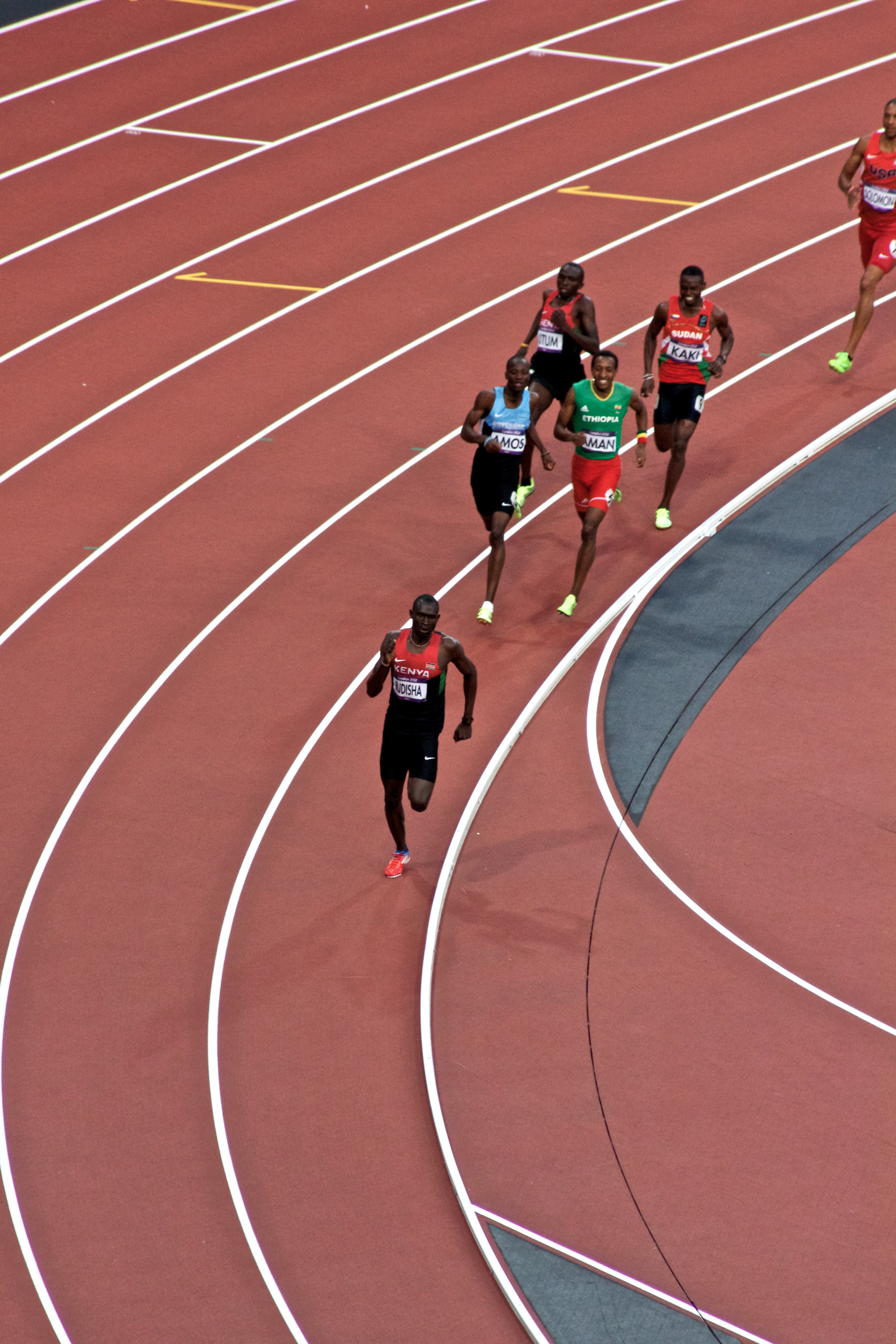
David Rudisha en route to his 800 m world record at the 2012 Summer Olympics

- The dimensions of the track and equipment used must conform to standards. In road events, the course must be accurately measured, by a certified measurer.
- Except in road events (road running and race walking), the performance must be set in a single-sex race, with the sole exception of the mixed-sex 4 × 400 m relay, introduced by World Athletics in 2017.
- All team members in a relay race must be of the same nationality.
- Pacemakers are allowed, provided they have not been lapped; lapped athletes must give way.
- Drug testing immediately after the performance is now required for ratification of a record. Existing records which predate this requirement are still extant. Athletes who pass the immediate test but are later found to have been using banned substances have their performances invalidated.
- In running events up to 200 m in distance and in horizontal jump events, wind assistance is permitted only up to 2.0 m/s. In decathlon or heptathlon, average wind assistance of less than 2.0 m/s is required across all applicable disciplines; and maximum of 4.0 m/s in any one event. As an exception, according to rule 36.2, specific event organizers may choose to ignore wind velocity readings exclusively for their specific event records (e.g. a performance in a 100 m race at a meeting with a wind reading of +2.4 m/s may be considered that specific meeting record, but will not be considered as a world record).
- In running events up to 800 m in distance, photo finish fully automatic timing is required.
- There is no restriction on altitude; since the thinner atmosphere of higher altitude provides less air resistance, locations such as Mexico City and Sestriere have previously been the sites of records in the sprint and jump events. See effects of high altitude on humans. Records set at high altitude venues are often marked with an "A" though that does not disqualify it as a record. Under those circumstances, a "sea level" best is also tracked by statisticians. Long-distance races run at altitude, with less oxygen available to the athlete, have been shown to be to the athlete's disadvantage.
- In road events, the course is not required to be a circuit, but the overall decrease in elevation between the start and finish shall not exceed 1:1000, i.e. 1 m/km.
- In road events, the start and finish points of a course, measured along a theoretical straight line between them, shall not be further apart than 50% of the race distance.

== Bonus payments ==
Breaking a world record is an important event for athletics fans, and athletes' personal sponsors and promoters of major meetings such as the Diamond League and its predecessor, the IAAF Golden League, have offered bonuses to athletes breaking a record.

Some middle-distance runners have specialized in acting as pacemakers in longer races, receiving a fee without even finishing the race, and possibly a bonus if a record results. This is a useful occupation for athletes who are capable of running accurately to a specified pace, but not capable of the fastest times to become champions in their own right.

In the pole vault record bonuses create an incentive for an athlete capable of beating a record by a large margin to instead break it by the minimum amount (one centimetre), multiple times, at multiple meetings, in order to accumulate multiple bonuses. This was done by Sergey Bubka and Yelena Isinbayeva in the men's and women's pole vault respectively, and some commentators have complained that neither athlete ever posted as high a mark as they were capable of. Since 2020, Armand Duplantis has been emulating the practice. In most other disciplines, this issue does not arise, since it is practically impossible to deliberately break a record by a small margin.

== World records ==
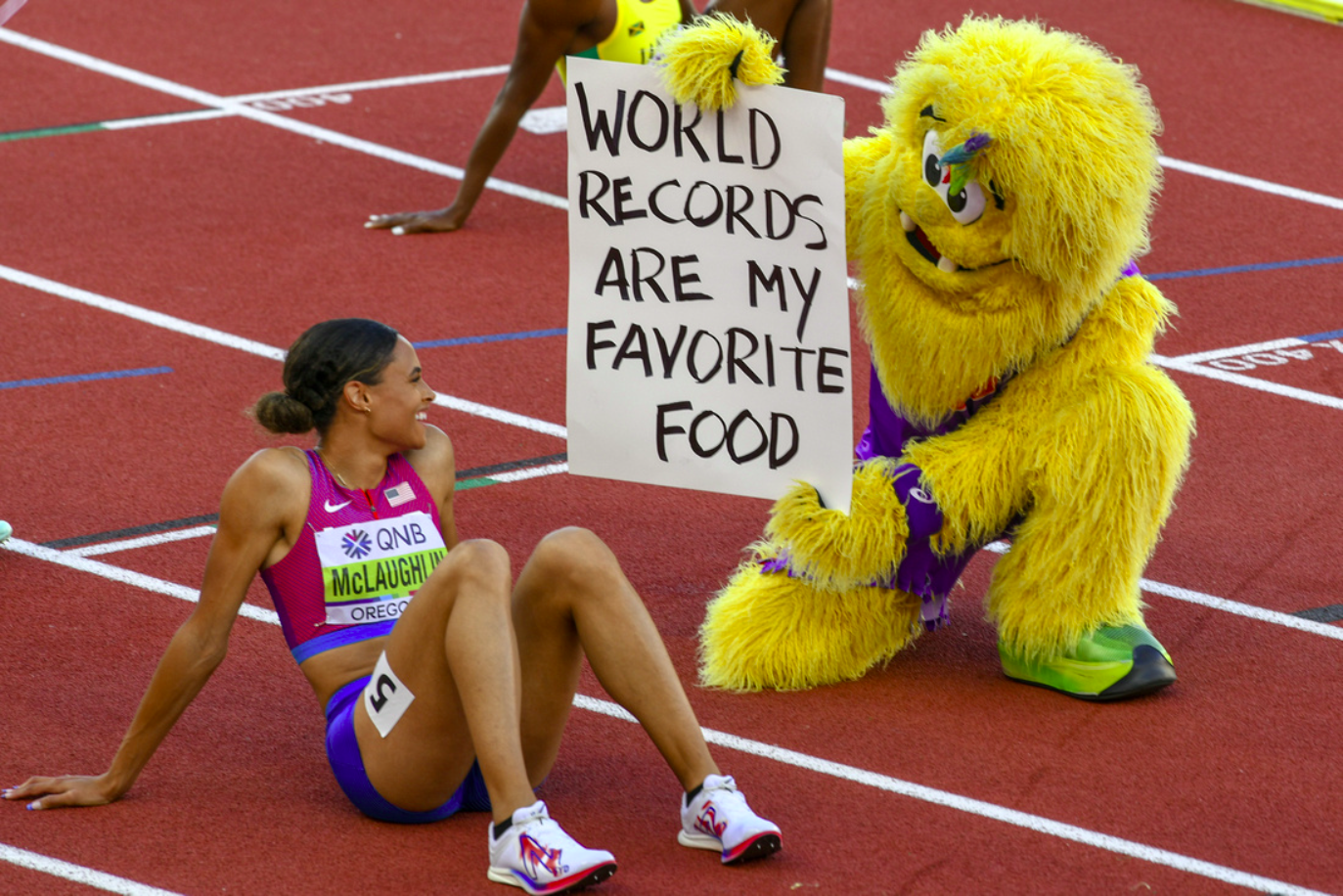
Sydney McLaughlin-Levrone being greeted with a "World records are my favorite food" sign at the 2022 World Athletics Championships

World Athletics (then IAAF) commenced the recognition of world records in 1912, and indoor world records after 1987. In 2000, IAAF rule 260.18a (formerly 260.6a) was amended, so that "world records" (as opposed to "indoor world records") can be set in a facility "with or without roof". This rule was not applied retroactively, and has, thus far, only affected the men's and women's pole vault, women's 2000 m and women's triple jump. The women's vault record has been advanced 9 times indoors by three different women, each ratified as a world record. The last record to be set indoors was in 2004. Sergey Bubka's 1993 pole vault world indoor record of 6.15 m was not considered to be a world record, because it was set before the new rule came into effect. Bubka's world record of 6.14 m, set outdoors in 1994, was surpassed by two different men since 2000, initially by Renaud Lavillenie in 2014 with a 6.16 m indoors mark, and most recently by Armand Duplantis in 2026 with a 6.31 m indoors mark.

In 2023, World Athletics decided to introduce the new term 'short track' to replace the previous term 'indoor' to describe events and performances that are set on a 200 m track. For track and combined events, the term "indoor world records" were changed to "short track world records". In some field events, including long jump, triple jump, high jump, pole vault, and shot put, indoor world records were eliminated. These changes came into effect on 1 November 2023.

=== Key to tables ===
Awaiting ratification not ratified or later rescinded by World Athletics

h = hand timing
+ = en route to a longer distance
A = affected by altitude
OT = oversized track
X = annulled due to doping violations
# = not officially ratified by World Athletics
a = aided road course according to IAAF rule 260.28
i = set indoors
sh = short track, including "indoors" but also allowing for outdoor 200 metres tracks
italicised event names indicate those typically used in major championships

=== Men ===
Event	Perf.	W	N	Average speed	Pts	Athlete(s)	Nat.	Date	Meeting	Location	Ctry.	R	V	P
Event	Perf.	W	N	mph (kph)	Pts	Athlete(s)	Nat.	Date	Meeting	Location	Ctry.	R	V	P
50 m	5.55		i X (Note: This time was rescinded after Johnson admitted using steroids between 1981 and 1988.)	20.15 (32.43)	1276	Ben Johnson	CAN	31 Jan 1987		Ottawa	CAN			
50 m	5.56		i A	20.12 (32.37)	1269	Donovan Bailey	CAN	9 Feb 1996	Bill Cosby Invitational	Reno	USA			
50 m	5.56		i # (Note: Insufficient or no doping control.)	20.12 (32.37)	1269	Maurice Greene	USA	13 Feb 1999		Los Angeles	USA			
60 m	6.34		i A	21.17 (34.07)	1304	Christian Coleman	USA	18 Feb 2018	USA Championships	Albuquerque	USA			P
100 m	9.58	+0.9		23.35 (37.58)	1356	Usain Bolt	JAM	16 Aug 2009	World Championships	Berlin	GER			P
200 m	19.19	−0.3		23.31 (37.52)	1352	Usain Bolt	JAM	20 Aug 2009	World Championships	Berlin	GER			P
200 m sh	19.92		i	22.46 (36.15)	1303	Frankie Fredericks	NAM	18 Feb 1996	Meeting Pas de Calais	Liévin	FRA			
400 m	43.03			20.79 (33.47)	1321	Wayde van Niekerk	RSA	14 Aug 2016	Olympic Games	Rio de Janeiro	BRA			P
400 m sh	44.52		i	20.10 (32.35)	1277	Khaleb McRae	USA	13 Feb 2026	Tyson Invitational	Fayetteville	USA			
400 m sh	44.52		i #	20.10 (32.35)	1277	Michael Norman	USA	10 Mar 2018	NCAA Division I Championships	College Station	USA			
400 m sh	44.49		i # (Note: Starting blocks did not comply with World Athletics regulations.)	20.11 (32.37)	1279	Christopher Morales Williams	CAN	24 Feb 2024	SEC Championships	Fayetteville	USA			
800 m	1:40.91			17.73 (28.54)	1301	David Rudisha	KEN	9 Aug 2012	Olympic Games	London	GBR			P
800 m sh	1:42.50		i	17.46 (28.10)	1311	Josh Hoey	USA	24 Jan 2026	New Balance Grand Prix	Boston	USA			P
1000 m	2:11.83			16.968 (27.308)	1253	Emmanuel Wanyonyi	KEN	10 Jul 2026	Herculis	Monaco	MON			P
1000 m sh	2:14.20		i	16.669 (26.826)	1274	Ayanleh Souleiman	DJI	17 Feb 2016	Globen Galan	Stockholm	SWE			
1500 m	3:26.00			16.288 (26.214)	1302	Hicham El Guerrouj	MAR	14 Jul 1998	Golden Gala	Rome	ITA			P
1500 m sh	3:29.63+		i	16.006 (25.760)	1306	Jakob Ingebrigtsen	NOR	13 Feb 2025	Meeting Hauts-de-France Pas-de-Calais	Liévin	FRA			
Mile	3:42.66			16.168 (26.020)	1298	Josh Kerr	GBR	18 Jul 2026	London Athletics Meet	London	GBR			P
Mile sh	3:45.14		i	15.990 (25.734)	1330	Jakob Ingebrigtsen	NOR	13 Feb 2025	Meeting Hauts-de-France Pas-de-Calais	Liévin	FRA			
Mile (road)	3:51.3		h	15.56 (25.05)	1184	Elliot Giles	GBR	1 Sep 2024	New Balance KO Meile	Düsseldorf	GER			
2000 m	4:43.13			15.80 (25.43)	1307	Jakob Ingebrigtsen	NOR	8 Sep 2023	Memorial van Damme	Brussels	BEL			P
3000 m	7:17.55			15.337 (24.683)	1320	Jakob Ingebrigtsen	NOR	25 Aug 2024	Kamila Skolimowska Memorial	Chorzów	POL			P
3000 m sh	7:22.91		i	15.152 (24.384)	1312	Grant Fisher	USA	8 Feb 2025	Millrose Games	New York City	USA			
5000 m	12:35.36			14.807 (23.830)	1302	Joshua Cheptegei	UGA	14 Aug 2020	Herculis	Monaco	MON			P
5000 m sh	12:44.09		i	14.638 (23.557)	1325	Grant Fisher	USA	14 Feb 2025	BU David Hemery Valentine Invitational	Boston	USA			
5 km (road)	12:49			14.54 (23.41)	1250	Berihu Aregawi	ETH	31 Dec 2021	Cursa dels Nassos	Barcelona	ESP			P
10,000 m	26:11.00			14.239 (22.915)	1306	Joshua Cheptegei	UGA	7 Oct 2020		Valencia	ESP			P
10 km (road)	26:31			14.06 (22.63)	1273	Yomif Kejelcha	ETH	16 Feb 2025	10K Facsa Castellón	Castellón de la Plana	ESP			P
10 km (road)	26:24		X	14.12 (22.73)	1285	Rhonex Kipruto	KEN	12 Jan 2020	10K Valencia Ibercaja	Valencia	ESP			P
Half marathon	56:51			13.83 (22.26)	1316	Yomif Kejelcha	ETH	23 Aug 2026	Media Maratón Ciudad de Buenos Aires	Buenos Aires	ARG			P
Half marathon	56:42		# (Note: Race conditions not in compliance with World Athletics rules)	13.87 (22.33)	1323	Jacob Kiplimo	UGA	16 Feb 2025	Barcelona Half Marathon	Barcelona	ESP			P
One hour (track)	21,330 m			13.254 (21.330)	N/A	Mo Farah	GBR	4 Sep 2020	Diamond League	Brussels	BEL			P
Marathon (Note: Up until 2004, the fastest time in the marathon was officially known as "world's best time" rather than "world record time", owing to the non-uniform nature of marathon courses. This older terminology is still sometimes encountered.)	1:59:30			13.165 (21.185)	1328	Sabastian Sawe	KEN	26 April 2026	London Marathon	London	UK			P
50 km (road)	2:38:43			11.74 (18.90)	N/A	CJ Albertson	USA	8 Oct 2022	Ruth Anderson Memorial Endurance Run	San Francisco	USA			
100 km (road)	6:05:35			10.198 (16.412)	N/A	Aleksandr Sorokin	LTU	14 May 2023	World's Fastest Run	Vilnius	LTU			P
100 km (road)	5:59:20		# (Note: Non-ratifiable as the athlete ran behind a car, wore unratified prototype shoes, and was paced by rotating pacemakers)	10.375 (16.697)	N/A	Sibusiso Kubheka	RSA	26 Aug 2025	Chasing 100	Nardò Ring	ITA			P
50 m hurdles	6.25		i	17.90 (28.8)	1272	Mark McKoy	CAN	5 Mar 1986		Kobe	JPN			
60 m hurdles	7.27		i A	18.46 (29.71)	1284	Grant Holloway	USA	16 Feb 2024	USA Championships	Albuquerque	USA			P
110 m hurdles	12.75	+1.0		19.30 (31.06)	1304	Ja'Kobe Tharp	USA	10 Jun 2026	NCAA DI Men's Outdoor Championships	Eugene	USA			P
400 m hurdles	45.80			19.54 (31.44)	1348	Alison dos Santos	BRA	27 Aug 2026	Weltklasse Zürich	Zurich	SUI			P
3000 m steeplechase	7:52.11			14.215 (22.876)	1295	Lamecha Girma	ETH	9 Jun 2023	Meeting de Paris	Paris	FRA			P
High jump	2.45 m				1314	Javier Sotomayor	CUB	27 Jul 1993	Gran Premio Diputación	Salamanca	ESP			P
Pole vault	6.31 m		i		1353	Armand Duplantis	SWE	12 Mar 2026	Mondo Classic	Uppsala	SWE			P
Long jump	8.95 m	+0.3			1346	Mike Powell	USA	30 Aug 1991	World Championships	Tokyo	JPN			P
Triple jump	18.29 m	+1.3			1303	Jonathan Edwards	GBR	7 Aug 1995	World Championships	Gothenburg	SWE			P
Shot put	23.56 m				1334	Ryan Crouser	USA	27 May 2023	USATF LA Grand Prix	Los Angeles	USA			P
Discus throw	75.56 m				1342	Mykolas Alekna	LTU	13 Apr 2025	Oklahoma Throws Series	Ramona	USA			P
Hammer throw	86.74 m				1307	Yuriy Sedykh	URS	30 Aug 1986	European Championships	Stuttgart	FRG			P
Javelin throw	98.48 m		(Note: See javelin specifications below.)		1365	Jan Železný	CZE	25 May 1996		Jena	GER			P
Heptathlon sh	6670 pts		i (Note: 60 m: 6.69, LJ: 8.15 m, SP: 14.87 m, HJ: 2.02 m, 60 mH: 7.52, PV: 5.30 m, 1000 m: 2:41.04)			Simon Ehammer	SUI	21 Mar 2026	World Championships	Toruń	POL			P
Decathlon	9126 pts		(Note: 100 m: 10.55 (+0.3 m/s), LJ: 7.80 m (+1.2 m/s), SP: 16.00 m, HJ: 2.05 m, 400 m: 48.42, 110 mH: 13.75 (−1.1 m/s), DT: 50.54 m, PV: 5.45 m, JT: 71.90 m, 1500 m: 4:36.11)		1302	Kevin Mayer	FRA	16 Sep 2018	Décastar	Talence	FRA			P
5000 m walk sh	18:07.08		i	10.289 (16.558)	1220	Mikhail Shchennikov	RUS	14 Feb 1995	Russian Winter Meeting	Moscow	RUS			
5000 m walk sh	17:55.65		i # (Note: Requisite level of judges not met.)	10.398 (16.734)	1232	Francesco Fortunato	ITA	22 Feb 2025	Italian Championships	Ancona	ITA			
5000 m walk sh	17:54.48		i	10.409 (16.752)	1233	Francesco Fortunato	ITA	28 Feb 2026	Italian Championships	Ancona	ITA			
20,000 m walk (track)	1:17:25.6		(Note: Actually 1:17:25.5 but ratified as 1:17:25.6. Hand timed.)	9.630 (15.499)	1247	Bernardo Segura	MEX	7 May 1994		Bergen	NOR			
20 km walk (road)	1:16:10			9.789 (15.755)	1275	Toshikazu Yamanishi	JPN	16 Feb 2025	Japanese 20km Race Walking Championships	Kobe	JPN			P
Half marathon walk (road)	1:20:34			9.763 (15.712)	1286	Toshikazu Yamanishi	JPN	15 Feb 2026	Japanese Half Marathon Race Walking Championships	Kobe	JPN			
2 hours walk (track)	29,572 m		+	9.188 (14.786)	N/A	Maurizio Damilano	ITA	3 Oct 1992		Cuneo	ITA			
30,000 m walk (track)	2:01:44.1			9.188 (14.786)	N/A	Maurizio Damilano	ITA	3 Oct 1992		Cuneo	ITA			
35 km walk (road)	2:20:43			9.273 (14.924)	1265	Massimo Stano	ITA	18 May 2025	European Race Walking Team Championships	Poděbrady	CZE			P
Marathon walk (road)	2:55:14			8.977 (14.448)	1262	Masatora Kawano	JPN	25 October 2026	All Japan Race Walking	Takahata	JPN			
50,000 m walk (track)	3:35:27.2		h	8.652 (13.924)	N/A	Yohann Diniz	FRA	12 Mar 2011		Reims	FRA			
50 km walk (road)	3:32:33			8.770 (14.114)	1269	Yohann Diniz	FRA	15 Aug 2014	European Championships	Zürich	SUI			P
4 × 100 m relay	36.84			24.29 (39.09)	1318	Nesta Carter; Michael Frater; Yohan Blake; Usain Bolt	JAM	11 Aug 2012	Olympic Games	London	GBR			P
4 × 200 m relay	1:18.63			22.76 (36.63)	1272	Nickel Ashmeade; Warren Weir; Jermaine Brown; Yohan Blake	JAM	24 May 2014	World Relays	Nassau	BAH			P
4 × 200 m relay sh	1:22.11		i	21.80 (35.08)	1195	Linford Christie; Darren Braithwaite; Ade Mafe; John Regis	GBR	3 Mar 1991		Glasgow	GBR			
4 × 400 m relay	2:54.29			20.535 (33.048)	1288	Andrew Valmon; Quincy Watts; Butch Reynolds; Michael Johnson	USA	22 Aug 1993	World Championships	Stuttgart	GER	(Note: A time of 2:54.20 set by the United States at Uniondale on 22 July 1998 was rescinded by the IAAF on 12 August 2008 after relay team member Antonio Pettigrew admitted to using human growth hormone and EPO between 1997 and 2003.)		P
4 × 400 m relay sh	3:01.51		i (Note: University of Houston team: Leg 1 Amere Lattin (46.33) Leg 2 Obi Igbowke (44.93) Leg 3 Jermaine Holt (45.80) Leg 4 Kahmari Montgomery (44.45))	19.719 (31.734)	1228	Amere Lattin; Obi Igbokwe; Jermaine Holt; Kahmari Montgomery	USA	9 Feb 2019	Clemson's Tiger Paw Invitational	Clemson	USA			
4 × 400 m relay sh	3:00.77		i (Note: University of Southern California team: Leg 1 Zach Shinnick (46.24) Leg 2 Rai Benjamin (44.35) Leg 3 Ricky Morgan Jr. (45.67) Leg 4 Michael Norman (44.52)) # (Note: Time not eligible as a record as Benjamin was representing Antigua & Barbuda internationally at the time (silver medal at the 2015 CARIFTA Games), while Norman had represented the United States internationally (2 gold medals at the 2016 IAAF World U20 Championships))	19.799 (31.864)	1239	Zach Shinnick; Rai Benjamin; Ricky Morgan Jr. Michael Norman	USA; ATG; USA; USA	10 Mar 2018	NCAA Division I Championships	College Station	USA			
4 × 400 m relay sh	3:01.39		i (Note: Texas A&M University team: Leg 1 Ilolo Izu (46.57) Leg 2 Robert Grant (44.83) Leg 3 Devin Dixon (45.48) Leg 4 Mylik Kerley (44.51)) #	19.732 (31.755)	1230	Ilolo Izu; Robert Grant; Devin Dixon; Mylik Kerley	USA	10 Mar 2018	NCAA Division I Championships	College Station	USA			
4 × 400 m relay sh	3:01.43		i (Note: University of Florida team - individual leg times not available (as compared to other college team records on this table)) # (Note: Time not eligible as a record as the team members are not of the same nationality)	19.727 (31.748)	1229	Kunle Fasasi; Grant Holloway; Chantz Sawyers; Benjamin Lobo Vedel	NGR; USA; JAM; DEN	10 Mar 2018	NCAA Division I Championships	College Station	USA			
4 × 800 m relay	7:02.43			16.945 (27.271)	1244	Joseph Mutua; William Yiampoy; Ismael Kombich; Wilfred Bungei	KEN	25 Aug 2006	Memorial Van Damme	Brussels	BEL			
4 × 800 m relay sh	7:10.29		i (Note: USA team: Leg 1 Clay Pender (1:49.69) Leg 2 Luke Houser (1:47.47) Leg 3 Luciano Fiore (1:47.35) Leg 4 Sean Dolan (1:45.79))	16.636 (26.773)	1276	Clay Pender; Luke Houser; Luciano Fiore; Sean Dolan	USA	6 Feb 2026	Penn Classic	Philadelphia	USA			
Distance medley relay	9:15.50		(Note: Leg 1 (1200 m) Kyle Merber 2:53.56 Leg 2 (400 m) Brycen Spratling 45.95 Leg 3 (800 m) Brandon Johnson 1:44.75 Leg 4 (1600 m) Ben Blankenship 3:51.24)	16.108 (25.923)	N/A	Kyle Merber; Brycen Spratling; Brandon Johnson; Ben Blankenship	USA	3 May 2015	World Relays	Nassau	BAH			
Distance medley relay	9:14.58		(Note: Leg 1 (1200 m) Brannon Kidder 2:49.60 Leg 2 (400 m) Brandon Miller 46.60 Leg 3 (800 m) Isaiah Harris 1:45.75 Leg 4 (1600 m) Henry Wynne 3:52.64)	16.134 (25.966)	N/A	Brannon Kidder; Brandon Miller; Isaiah Harris; Henry Wynne	USA	19 April 2024	Oregon Relays	Eugene	USA			
4 × 1500 m relay	14:22.22			15.566 (25.052)	1311	Collins Cheboi; Silas Kiplagat; James Kiplagat Magut; Asbel Kiprop	KEN	25 May 2014	World Relays	Nassau	BAH			
Road relay 42.195 km	1:57:06		(Note: Leg 1 (5 km) Josephat Ndambiri 13:24 Leg 2 (10 km) Martin Mathathi 27:12 Leg 3 (5 km) Daniel Muchunu Mwangi 13:59 Leg 4 (10 km) Mekubo Mogusu 27:56 Leg 5 (5 km) Onesmus Nyerre 14:36 Leg 6 (7.195 km) John Kariuki 19:59)	13.434 (21.620)	N/A	Josephat Ndambiri; Martin Mathathi; Daniel Muchunu Mwangi; Mekubo Mogusu; Onesmus Nyerre; John Kariuki	KEN	23 Nov 2005	Chiba Ekiden	Chiba	JPN			

=== Women ===
Event	Perf.	W	N	Average speed	Pts	Athlete(s)	Nat.	Date	Meeting	Location	Ctry.	R	V	P
Event	Perf.	W	N	mph (kph)	Pts	Athlete(s)	Nat.	Date	Meeting	Location	Ctry.	R	V	P
50 m	5.96		i +	18.76 (30.20)	1245	Irina Privalova	RUS	9 Feb 1995		Madrid	ESP			
60 m	6.92		i	19.40 (31.21)	1248	Irina Privalova	RUS	11 Feb 1993		Madrid	ESP			P
60 m	6.92		i	19.40 (31.21)	1248	Irina Privalova	RUS	9 Feb 1995		Madrid	ESP			P
100 m	10.49	0.0	(Note: It is widely believed that the anemometer was faulty for the race in which Florence Griffith Joyner set the official world record for the women's 100 m of 10.49 s. A 1995 report commissioned by the IAAF estimated the true wind speed was between +5.0 m/s and +7.0 m/s, rather than the 0.0 recorded. If this time were excluded, the world record would be 10.54 s, recorded by Elaine Thompson-Herah at the 2021 Diamond League event in Eugene, Oregon.)	21.32 (34.32)	1314	Florence Griffith Joyner	USA	16 Jul 1988	US Olympic Trials	Indianapolis	USA			P
200 m	21.34	+1.3		20.97 (33.74)	1308	Florence Griffith Joyner	USA	29 Sep 1988	Olympic Games	Seoul	KOR			P
200 m sh	21.87		i	20.46 (32.92)	1288	Merlene Ottey	JAM	13 Feb 1993	Meeting Pas de Calais	Liévin	FRA			
400 m	47.60			18.80 (30.25)	1304	Marita Koch	GDR	6 Oct 1985	World Cup	Canberra	AUS			P
400 m sh	49.17		i	18.20 (29.29)	1272	Femke Bol	NED	2 Mar 2024	World Championships	Glasgow	GBR			
800 m	1:53.28			15.80 (25.42)	1286	Jarmila Kratochvílová	TCH	26 Jul 1983		Munich	FRG			P
800 m sh	1:55.82		i	15.45 (24.87)	1255	Jolanda Čeplak	SLO	3 Mar 2002	European Championships	Vienna	AUT			
800 m sh	1:54.87		i	15.58 (25.07)	1272	Keely Hodgkinson	GBR	19 Feb 2026	Meeting Hauts-de-France Pas-de-Calais	Liévin	FRA			
1000 m	2:28.98			15.015 (24.164)	1251	Svetlana Masterkova	RUS	23 Aug 1996	Memorial Van Damme	Brussels	BEL			P
1000 m sh	2:30.94		i	14.82 (23.851)	1246	Maria Mutola	MOZ	25 Feb 1999	GE Galan	Stockholm	SWE			
1500 m	3:48.68			14.673 (23.614)	1298	Faith Kipyegon	KEN	5 Jul 2025	Prefontaine Classic	Eugene	USA			P
1500 m sh	3:53.09		i	14.395 (23.167)	1285	Gudaf Tsegay	ETH	9 Feb 2021	Meeting Hauts-de-France Pas-de-Calais	Liévin	FRA			
Mile	4:06.91		(Note: Non-ratifiable due to the use of multiple male pace-makers)	14.610 (23.512)	1296	Faith Kipyegon	KEN	26 Jun 2025	Breaking4	Paris, France	FRA			P
Mile	4:07.64			14.537 (23.395)	1286	Faith Kipyegon	KEN	21 Jul 2023	Herculis	Monaco	MON			P
Mile sh	4:13.31		i	14.212 (22.872)	1273	Genzebe Dibaba	ETH	17 Feb 2016	Globen Galan	Stockholm	SWE			
Mile (road)	4:20.98		Wo	13.714 (22.071)	1185	Diribe Welteji	ETH	1 Oct 2023	World Road Running Championships	Riga	LVA			P
2000 m	5:19.70			13.994 (22.521)	1252	Jessica Hull	AUS	12 Jul 2024	Herculis	Monaco	MON			P
3000 m	8:06.11			13.805 (22.217)	1293	Wang Junxia	CHN	13 Sep 1993	Chinese National Games	Beijing	CHN			P
3000 m sh	8:16.60		i	13.514 (21.748)	1281	Genzebe Dibaba	ETH	6 Feb 2014	XL Galan	Stockholm	SWE			
5000 m	13:58.06			13.346 (21.478)	1286	Beatrice Chebet	KEN	5 Jul 2025	Prefontaine Classic	Eugene	USA			P
5000 m sh	14:18.86		i	13.023 (20.958)	1270	Genzebe Dibaba	ETH	19 Feb 2015	XL Galan	Stockholm	SWE			
5 km (road)	13:54		Mx	13.41 (21.58)	1295	Beatrice Chebet	KEN	31 Dec 2024	Cursa dels Nassos	Barcelona	ESP			P
5 km (road)	14:13		Wo	13.11 (21.10)		Beatrice Chebet	KEN	31 Dec 2024	Cursa dels Nassos	Barcelona	ESP			P
10,000 m	28:54.14			12.899 (20.760)	1309	Beatrice Chebet	KEN	25 May 2024	Prefontaine Classic	Eugene	USA			P
10 km (road)	28:46		Mx	12.96 (20.86)	1317	Agnes Jebet Ngetich	KEN	14 Jan 2024	10K Valencia Ibercaja	Valencia	ESP			P
10 km (road)	29:27		Wo	12.659 (20.373)	1278	Agnes Jebet Ngetich	KEN	26 Apr 2025	Adizero: Road to Records	Herzogenaurach	GER			P
10 km (road)	29:26 (Note: The Urban Trail de Lille is not considered a record-eligible race because it includes non-standard elements like running through buildings and navigating obstacles, which are not typical of standard road races.)		Wo	12.67 (20.39)	1279	Agnes Jebet Ngetich	KEN	18 Nov 2023	Urban Trail de Lille	Lille	FRA			P
10 km (road)	29:24 (Note: Ngetich's women's-only record was not certified after it was found the course was found to be 25 metres too short by World Athletics.)		Wo	12.68 (20.41)	N/A	Agnes Jebet Ngetich	KEN	10 Sep 2023	Brașov Running Festival	Brașov	ROU			P
One hour (track)	18,930 m			11.763 (18.930)	N/A	Sifan Hassan	NED	4 Sep 2020	Diamond League	Brussels	BEL			P
Half marathon	1:02:52		Mx	12.512 (20.135)	1281	Letesenbet Gidey	ETH	24 Oct 2021	Valencia Half Marathon	Valencia	ESP			P
Half marathon	1:05:16		Wo	12.051 (19.395)	1229	Peres Jepchirchir	KEN	17 Oct 2020	World Half Marathon Championships	Gdynia	POL			P
Half marathon	1:05:15		Wo	12.055 (19.400)	1229	Agnes Ngetich	KEN	20 Sep 2026	World Road Running Championships	Copenhagen	DEN			P
Marathon	2:09:56		Mx	12.107 (19.485)	1339	Ruth Chepng'etich	KEN	13 Oct 2024	Chicago Marathon	Chicago	USA			P
Marathon	2:15:41		Wo	11.594 (18.658)	1254	Tigst Assefa	ETH	26 Apr 2026	London Marathon	London	UK			
50 km (road)	2:59:54		Mx	10.36 (16.68)	N/A	Desiree Linden	USA	13 Apr 2021	Brooks Running 50 km & Marathon	Dorena Lake	USA			
50 km (road)	3:00:30		Wo	10.33 (16.62)	N/A	Emane Seifu Hayile	ETH	26 Feb 2023	Nedbank Runified Breaking Barriers Ultramarathon	Gqeberha	RSA			
100 km (road)	6:33:11		Mx	9.4822 (15.260)	N/A	Tomoe Abe	JPN	25 Jun 2000	Lake Saroma Ultramarathon	Yūbetsu	JPN			
50 m hurdles	6.58		i	17.00 (27.36)	1231	Cornelia Oschkenat	GDR	20 Feb 1988		East Berlin	GDR			
60 m hurdles	7.65		i	17.55 (28.24)	1242	Devynne Charlton	BAH	3 Mar 2024	World Championships	Glasgow	UK			P
60 m hurdles	7.65		i	17.55 (28.24)	1242	Devynne Charlton	BAH	22 Mar 2026	World Championships	Toruń	POL			P
60 m hurdles	7.63		i X	17.59 (28.31)	N/A	Lyudmila Narozhilenko	RUS	4 Mar 1993		Seville	ESP			P
100 m hurdles	12.09	0.0		18.50 (29.78)	1276	Masai Russell	USA	27 Aug 2026	Weltklasse Zürich	Zurich	SUI			P
400 m hurdles	50.37			17.76 (28.59)	1322	Sydney McLaughlin-Levrone	USA	8 Aug 2024	Olympic Games	Saint-Denis	FRA			P
3000 m steeplechase	8:44.32			12.799 (20.598)	1285	Beatrice Chepkoech	KEN	20 Jul 2018	Herculis	Monaco	MON			P
High jump	2.10 m				1319	Yaroslava Mahuchikh	UKR	7 Jul 2024	Meeting de Paris	Paris	FRA			P
Pole vault	5.06 m				1290	Yelena Isinbayeva	RUS	28 Aug 2009	Weltklasse Zürich	Zürich	SUI			P
Long jump	7.52 m	+1.4			1333	Galina Chistyakova	URS	11 Jun 1988	Brothers Znamensky Memorial	Leningrad	URS			P
Triple jump	15.74 m	N/A	i		1297	Yulimar Rojas	VEN	20 Mar 2022	World Championships	Belgrade	SRB			P
Shot put	22.63 m				1372	Natalya Lisovskaya	URS	7 Jun 1987	Brothers Znamensky Memorial	Moscow	URS			P
Discus throw	76.80 m				1382	Gabriele Reinsch	GDR	9 Jul 1988	East Germany–Italy tournament	Neubrandenburg	GDR			P
Hammer throw	82.98 m				1303	Anita Włodarczyk	POL	28 Aug 2016	Kamila Skolimowska Memorial	Warsaw	POL			P
Javelin throw	72.28 m				1306	Barbora Špotáková	CZE	13 Sep 2008	World Athletics Final	Stuttgart	GER			P
Pentathlon sh	5055 pts		i (Note: 60 mH: 8.23, HJ: 1.92 m, SP: 15.54 m, LJ: 6.59 m, 800 m: 2:13.60)		1254	Nafissatou Thiam	BEL	3 Mar 2023	European Championships	Istanbul	TUR			
Heptathlon	7291 pts		(Note: 100 mH: 12.69 (+0.8 m/s), HJ: 1.86 m, SP: 15.80 m, 200 m: 22.56 (+1.6 m/s), LJ: 7.27 m (+0.7 m/s), JT: 45.66 m, 800 m: 2:08.51)		1331	Jackie Joyner-Kersee	USA	24 Sep 1988	Olympic Games	Seoul	KOR			P
Decathlon	8358 pts		(Note: 100 m: 12.49, LJ: 6.12 m, SP: 16.42 m, HJ: 1.78 m, 400 m: 57.19, 100 mH: 14.22, DT: 46.19 m, PV: 3.10 m, JT: 48.78 m, 1500 m: 5:15.86)		N/A	Austra Skujytė	LTU	15 Apr 2005	Audrey Walton Combined Events	Columbia	USA			P
3000 m walk sh	11:40.33		i	9.582 (15.421)	1207	Claudia Iovan	ROU	30 Jan 1999		Bucharest	ROU			
3000 m walk sh	11:35.34		i # (Note: No international judges.)	9.651 (15.532)	1217	Gillian O'Sullivan	IRL	15 Feb 2003		Belfast	GBR			
10,000 m walk (track)	41:56.23			8.890 (14.307)	1196	Nadezhda Ryashkina	URS	24 Jul 1990	Goodwill Games	Seattle	USA			
10,000 m walk (track)	41:37.9			8.955 (14.412)	1207	Gao Hongmiao	CHN	7 Apr 1994		Beijing	CHN			
20,000 m walk (track)	1:26:52.3		i	8.583 (13.814)	1193	Olimpiada Ivanova	RUS	6 Sep 2001	Goodwill Games	Brisbane	AUS			
20 km walk (road)	1:23:49			8.896 (14.317)	1248	Yang Jiayu	CHN	20 Mar 2021	Chinese Race Walking Championships	Huangshan	CHN			P
20 km walk (road)	1:23:39		(Note: Not ratified by World Athletics due to lack of international judges.)	8.914 (14.346)	1251	Elena Lashmanova	RUS	9 Jun 2018	Russian Race Walking Championships	Cheboksary	RUS			P
Half marathon walk (road)	1:30:06			8.730 (14.049)	1230	María Pérez	ESP	15 August 2026	European Championships	Birmingham	GBR			
35 km walk (road)	2:37:15			8.298 (13.355)	1262	María Pérez	ESP	21 May 2023	European Race Walking Team Championships	Poděbrady	CZE			
Marathon walk (road)	3:15:11			8.060 (12.971)	1262	Sofia Fiorini	ITA	15 August 2026	European Championships	Birmingham	GBR			
Marathon walk (road)	3:14:52			8.073 (12.992)	1265	Rebecca Henderson	AUS	25 October 2026	All Japan Race Walking	Takahata	JPN			
50,000 m walk (track)	4:29:45.56		(Note: A minimum standard of 4:20:00 has been recommended for the first record. The record will be vacant until such a performance is achieved.)	6.910 (11.121)	N/A	Katie Burnett	USA	13 Jul 2019	National Invitational Racewalks	San Diego	USA			
50 km walk (road)	3:59:15			7.791 (12.539)	1244	Liu Hong	CHN	9 Mar 2019	Chinese Race Walk Grand Prix	Huangshan	CHN			P
50 km walk (road)	3:57:08			7.861 (12.651)	1256	Klavdiya Afanasyeva	RUS	15 Jun 2019	Russian Race Walking Championships	Cheboksary	RUS			P
4 × 100 m relay	40.82			21.92 (35.28)	1273	Tianna Madison; Allyson Felix; Bianca Knight; Carmelita Jeter	USA	10 Aug 2012	Olympic Games	London	GBR			P
4 × 200 m relay	1:27.46			20.46 (32.93)	1233	LaTasha Jenkins; LaTasha Colander-Richardson; Nanceen Perry; Marion Jones	USA	29 Apr 2000	Penn Relays	Philadelphia	USA			
4 × 200 m relay	1:27.05		(Note: Time not eligible as a record as the team members are not of the same nationality)	20.56 (33.08)	1241	Dina Asher-Smith; Rhasidat Adeleke; Lanae-Tava Thomas; Julien Alfred	GBR; IRL; JAM; LCA	30 Mar 2024	Texas Relays	Austin	USA			
4 × 200 m relay sh	1:32.41		i	19.37 (31.17)	1181	Yekaterina Kondratyeva; Irina Khabarova; Yuliya Pechonkina; Yuliya Gushchina	RUS	29 Jan 2005	Aviva International Match	Glasgow	GBR			
4 × 400 m relay	3:15.17			18.338 (29.513)	1267	Tatyana Ledovskaya; Olga Nazarova; Mariya Pinigina; Olga Bryzgina	URS	1 Oct 1988	Olympic Games	Seoul	KOR			P
4 × 400 m relay sh	3:23.37		i	17.599 (28.323)	1220	Olesya Krasnomovets; Olga Zaytseva; Olga Kotlyarova; Yuliya Gushchina	RUS	28 Jan 2006	Aviva International Match	Glasgow	GBR			
4 × 400 m relay sh	3:21.75		i A (Note: Time not eligible as a record as the team members are not of the same nationality) (Note: University of Arkansas team)	17.740 (28.550)	1234	Amber Anning; Joanne Reid; Rosey Effiong; Britton Wilson	GBR; JAM; USA; USA	11 Mar 2023	NCAA Division I Championships	Albuquerque	USA			
4 × 800 m relay	7:50.17			15.225 (24.502)	1260	Irina Podyalovskaya; Nadezhda Olizarenko; Lyubov Gurina; Lyudmila Borisova	URS	5 Aug 1984		Moscow	URS			
4 × 800 m relay sh	8:05.89		i	14.732 (23.709)	1295	Chrishuna Williams; Raevyn Rogers; Charlene Lipsey; Ajeé Wilson	USA	3 Feb 2018	Millrose Games	New York City	USA			
Distance medley relay	10:36.50		(Note: Leg 1 (1200 m) Treniere Moser 3:18.38 Leg 2 (400 m) Sanya Richards-Ross 50.12 Leg 3 (800 m) Ajeé Wilson 2:00.08 Leg 4 (1600 m) Shannon Rowbury 4:27.92)	14.058 (22.624)	N/A	Treniere Moser; Sanya Richards-Ross; Ajeé Wilson; Shannon Rowbury	USA	2 May 2015	World Relays	Nassau	BAH			
4 × 1500 m relay	16:27.02			13.598 (21.884)	1260	Colleen Quigley; Elise Cranny; Karissa Schweizer; Shelby Houlihan	USA	31 Jul 2020	Bowerman TC Intrasquad Meet IV	Portland	USA			
Road relay 42.195 km	2:11:41		Mx (Note: Leg 1 (5 km) Jiang Bo 15:42 Leg 2 (10 km) Dong Yanmei 31:36 Leg 3 (5 km) Zhao Fengting 15:16 Leg 4 (10 km) Ma Zaijie 31:01 Leg 5 (5 km) Lan Lixin 15:50 Leg 6 (7.195 km) Li Na 22:16)	11.946 (19.226)	N/A	Jiang Bo; Dong Yanmei; Zhao Fengting; Ma Zaijie; Lan Lixin; Li Na	CHN	28 Feb 1998		Beijing	CHN			
Road relay 42.195 km	2:16:04		Wo	11.561 (18.606)	N/A	Genet Gebregiogios; Birhane Adere; Ayelech Worku; Gete Wami; Getenesh Urge; Luchia Yischak	ETH	13 Apr 1996		Copenhagen	DEN			

=== Mixed ===
Event	Perf.	N	Avg speed (mph, kph)	Pts	Athlete(s)	Nat.	Date	Meeting	Location	Ctry.	R	V	P
4 × 100 m relay	39.62		22.58 (36.35)		Ackeem Blake; Tina Clayton; Kadrian Goldson; Tia Clayton	JAM	3 May 2026	World Relays	Gaborone	BOT			P
4 × 400 m relay	3:07.41		19.10 (30.74)		Vernon Norwood (44.47); Shamier Little (49.32); Bryce Deadmon (44.17); Kaylyn Brown (49.45)	USA	2 Aug 2024	Olympic Games	Saint-Denis	FRA			P
4 × 400 m relay sh	3:12.44	(Note: The time of 3:12.44 or faster is the target set by World Athletics for the first world record of this event.)	Vacant										

== World best performances ==
Records in events without World Athletics-ratified world records are typically referred to as world best performances or world bests.

While races over imperial measured distances were very common in the first half of the 20th century, only the mile remains common today due to its historical prominence in track and field: all other imperial measured distance races became increasingly rare, and the IAAF deleted these events from the world record books in 1976.

In November 2019, World Athletics (WA; formerly IAAF) also deleted several long-distance events (track distances of 20,000 metres, 25,000 metres and 30,000 metres and road distances of 15 km, 20 km, 25 km and 30 km) from the world record books.

Some road racing distances and indoor variations of outdoor events fall outside of WA's lists, and records set in uncommon events usually do not adhere to the strict criteria found in WA-ratifiable events: one example is the 150 metres record, which was set by Usain Bolt on a specially-made straight track, while previous performances (such as the Bailey–Johnson 150-metre race) were completed on a traditional circuit which included a partial bend in the track.

The 40-yard dash, a standard acceleration evaluation for American football players, does not fall within the usual criteria of athletics racing events. In most 40-yard dashes, reaction times are not recorded as timing starts only once the player is in motion, and the standards for timing a "football 40" are so lax and inconsistent that a real world record cannot be claimed.

Performances are also hand-timed and calculated to 1/100 of a second, although studies have shown human beings simply cannot react consistently or accurately enough for this to be a valid method, and even those using light beams are timed by the motion of the athlete, removing the normal factor of reaction time; further, football 40-yard dashes are usually run on a turf surface as opposed to an all weather track. All of these factors make track and "football 40" performances essentially impossible to compare.

The world best time for a "football 40" is 4.17 by Deion Sanders, while the extrapolated best for an Olympic-level athlete (including reacting to a starting gun) is 4.24 by Maurice Greene at the 2001 World Championships in Athletics. Under conventional football timing on a turf field in 2017, Christian Coleman reportedly ran a 4.12.

=== Outdoor events ===
==== Men ====
Event	Perf.	W	N	Athlete(s)	Nat.	Avg speed (mph, kph)	Pts	Date	Meeting	Location	Ctry.	R	V	P
50 m	5.45	+0.9	+ (Note: Calculated.)	Su Bingtian	CHN	20.52 (33.03)	N/A	1 Aug 2021	Olympic Games	Tokyo	JPN			
60 m	6.29	+0.9	+ (Note: Calculated.)	Su Bingtian	CHN	21.34 (34.34)	N/A	1 Aug 2021	Olympic Games	Tokyo	JPN			
100 y	9.0		h	Ivory Crockett	USA	22.7 (36.6)	N/A	11 May 1974		Knoxville	USA			
100 y	9.0		h	Houston McTear	USA	22.7 (36.6)	N/A	9 May 1975		Winter Park	USA			
100 y	9.07	−0.5	+	Asafa Powell	JAM	22.55 (36.29)	N/A	27 May 2010	Golden Spike Ostrava	Ostrava	CZE			
150 m	14.44	−0.3	+	Usain Bolt	JAM	23.24 (37.40)	N/A	20 Aug 2009	World Championships	Berlin	GER			
150 m straight	14.35	+1.1		Usain Bolt	JAM	23.38 (37.63)	N/A	17 May 2009	Manchester City Games	Manchester	GBR			
200 m straight	19.41	−0.4		Tyson Gay	USA	23.05 (37.09)	N/A	16 May 2010	Manchester City Games	Manchester	GBR			
220 y (straight)	19.5	+1.9	h	Tommie Smith	USA	23.08 (37.14)	N/A	7 May 1966	Video on YouTube	San Jose, California	USA			
220 y (straight)	19.54	−0.4		Tyson Gay	USA	23.03 (37.06)	N/A	16 May 2010	Manchester City Games	Manchester	GBR			
300 m	30.69		A	Letsile Tebogo	BOT	21.866 (35.191)	1286	17 Feb 2024	Simbine Curro Classic Shoot-Out	Pretoria	RSA			
440 y	44.5			John Smith	USA	20.23 (32.55)	N/A	26 Jun 1971	USA Championships	Eugene	USA			
500 m	57.69		(Note: Road race.)	David Rudisha	KEN	19.388 (31.201)	N/A	10 Sep 2016	Great North CityGames	Newcastle	GBR			
600 m	1:12.81			Johnny Gray	USA	18.434 (29.666)	1239	24 May 1986		Santa Monica	USA			
1600 m	3:41.84c		(Note: Converted from respective Mile or Two Mile time. This is an equivalent time for 1600 m or 3200 m, not necessarily the precise time the athlete split for the lesser distance en route to the mile or two mile.)	Hicham El Guerrouj	MAR	16.134 (25.966)	N/A	7 Jul 1999	Golden Gala	Rome	ITA			
3200 m	7:51.35c		(Note: Converted from respective Mile or Two Mile time.)	Jakob Ingebrigtsen	NOR	15.187 (24.440)	N/A	9 Jun 2023	Meeting de Paris	Paris	FRA			
Two miles	7:54.10			Jakob Ingebrigtsen	NOR	15.187 (24.441)	1304	9 Jun 2023	Meeting de Paris	Paris	FRA			P
8 km (road)	21:11		+	Rhonex Kipruto	KEN	14.080 (22.659)	N/A	12 Jan 2020	10K Valencia Ibercaja	Valencia	ESP			
15 km (road)	40:07		+	Jacob Kiplimo	UGA	13.940 (22.435)	1309	16 Feb 2025	Barcelona Half Marathon	Barcelona	ESP			
10 miles (road)	44:04			Benard Kibet	KEN	13.616 (21.912)	1257	4 Dec 2022	Kōsa 10-Miler	Kōsa	JAP			
20,000 m (track)	56:20.02		+	Bashir Abdi	BEL	13.236 (21.302)	N/A	4 Sep 2020	Diamond League	Brussels	BEL			
20 km (road)	53:42		+	Jacob Kiplimo	UGA	13.885 (22.346)	1314	16 Feb 2025	Barcelona Half Marathon	Barcelona	ESP			
25,000 m (track)	1:12:25.4		+ h	Moses Mosop	KEN	12.870 (20.712)	N/A	3 Jun 2011	Prefontaine Classic	Eugene	USA			
25 km (road)	1:11:08		+	Eliud Kipchoge	KEN	13.103 (21.087)	1219	25 Sep 2022	Berlin Marathon	Berlin	GER			
25 km (road)	1:10:59		+# (Note: Non-ratifiable as the athlete was the sole competitor, ran behind a car, received drinks from a bike, and was paced by rotating pacemakers)	Eliud Kipchoge	KEN	13.130 (21.131)	N/A	12 Oct 2019	INEOS 1:59 Challenge	Vienna	AUT			
30,000 m (track)	1:26:47.4		h	Moses Mosop	KEN	12.887 (20.740)	N/A	3 Jun 2011	Prefontaine Classic	Eugene	USA			
30 km (road)	1:25:40		+	Eliud Kipchoge	KEN	13.056 (21.012)	1249	25 Sep 2022	Berlin Marathon	Berlin	GER			
30 km (road)	1:25:31		+	Jacob Kiplimo	UGA	13.079 (21.048)	1253	12 Oct 2025	Chicago Marathon	Chicago	USA			
30 km (road)	1:25:11		+# (Note: Non-ratifiable as the athlete was the sole competitor, ran behind a car, received drinks from a bike, and was paced by rotating pacemakers)	Eliud Kipchoge	KEN	13.136 (21.156)	N/A	12 Oct 2019	INEOS 1:59 Challenge	Vienna	AUT			
35 km (road)	1:39:57		+	Sabastian Sawe	KEN	13.055 (21.010)	N/A	26 April 2026	London Marathon	London	UK			
35 km (road)	1:39:57		+	Yomif Kejelcha	ETH	13.055 (21.010)	N/A	26 April 2026	London Marathon	London	UK			
35 km (road)	1:39:23		+# (Note: Non-ratifiable as the athlete was the sole competitor, ran behind a car, received drinks from a bike, and was paced by rotating pacemakers)	Eliud Kipchoge	KEN	13.130 (21.130)	N/A	12 Oct 2019	INEOS 1:59 Challenge	Vienna	AUT			
40 km (road)	1:53:39		+	Yomif Kejelcha	ETH	13.122 (21.117)	N/A	26 April 2026	London Marathon	London	UK			
40 km (road)	1:53:39		+	Sabastian Sawe	KEN	13.122 (21.117)	N/A	26 April 2026	London Marathon	London	UK			
40 km (road)	1:53:36		+# (Note: Non-ratifiable as the athlete was the sole competitor, ran behind a car, received drinks from a bike, and was paced by rotating pacemakers)	Eliud Kipchoge	KEN	13.127 (21.127)	N/A	12 Oct 2019	INEOS 1:59 Challenge	Vienna	AUT			
100,000 m (track)	6:05:41			Aleksandr Sorokin	LTU	10.195 (16.408)	N/A	23 Apr 2022	Centurion Running Track 100 Mile	Bedfordshire	UK			
100 miles (track)	11:14:56		+	Aleksandr Sorokin	LTU	8.890 (13.307)	N/A	24 Apr 2021	Centurion Running Track 100 Mile	Ashford	UK			
100 miles (road)	10:51:39		+	Aleksandr Sorokin	LTU	9.207 (14.818)	N/A	6 Jan 2022	Spartanion Race	Tel Aviv	ISR			
12-hour run (track)	170,309 m			Aleksandr Sorokin	LTU	8.819 (14.192)	N/A	24 Apr 2021	Centurion Running Track 100 Mile	Ashford	UK			
12-hour run (road)	177,410 m			Aleksandr Sorokin	LTU	9.186 (14.784)	N/A	6 Jan 2022	Spartanion Race	Tel Aviv	ISR			
24-hour run (track)	303,506 m			Yiannis Kouros	AUS	7.858 (12.646)	N/A	5 Oct 1997	Sri Chinmoy 24-hours	Adelaide	AUS			
24-hour run (road)	319,614 m			Aleksandr Sorokin	LTU	8.275 (13.317)	N/A	18 Sep 2022	IAU 24 Hour European Championships	Verona	ITA			
48-hour run (road)	485,099 m			Matthieu Bonne	BEL	6.279 (10.106)	N/A	30 May–1 Jun 2025	GOMU 48-Hour World Championship	Pabianice	POL			
2000 m steeplechase	5:10.68			Mahiedine Mekhissi-Benabbad	FRA	14.400 (23.175)	1248	30 Jun 2010	Alma Athlé Tour	Reims	FRA			
2500 m steeplechase	7:34.4		h	George Orton	CAN	12.307 (19.806)	N/A	15 Jul 1900	Olympic Games	Paris	FRA			
2590 m steeplechase	7:39.6		h	James Lightbody	USA	12.606 (20.287)	N/A	29 Aug 1904	Olympic Games	St. Louis	USA			
3460 m steeplechase	10:33.4		h (Note: The race was intended to be a 3000 metres steeplechase, but due to an error in lap counting, the competitors ran an extra lap in the final.)	Volmari Iso-Hollo	FIN	12.219 (19.665)	N/A	1 Aug 1932	Olympic Games	Los Angeles	USA			
4000 m steeplechase	12:58.4		h	John Rimmer	GBR	11.495 (18.500)	N/A	16 Jul 1900	Olympic Games	Paris	FRA			
200 m hurdles	22.55			Laurent Ottoz	ITA	19.840 (31.929)	N/A	31 May 1995		Milan	ITA			
200 m hurdles straight	21.85	+1.5		Alison dos Santos	BRA		N/A	17 May 2025	Adidas Games	Atlanta	USA			
220 y hurdles straight	21.9	+1.4	h	Don Styron	USA	20.548 (33.069)	N/A	2 Apr 1960		Baton Rouge	USA			
300 m hurdles	32.67			Karsten Warholm	NOR	20.541 (33.058)	1319	12 Jun 2025	Bislett Games	Oslo	NOR			
440 y hurdles	48.7			Jim Bolding	USA	18.48 (29.74)	N/A	25 Jul 1974		Turin	ITA			
Standing long jump	12 ft 3 in			Byron Jones	USA		N/A	23 Feb 2015	NFL Scouting Combine	Indianapolis	USA			
Standing triple jump	10.95 m			Tydree Lewis	USA		N/A	31 Oct 2011						
Weight throw	25.41 m			Lance Deal	USA		N/A	20 Feb 1993		Azusa	USA			
Icosathlon	14571 pts			Joseph Detmer	USA		N/A	25 Sep 2010	World Championships	Lynchburg, Virginia	USA			
1500 m walk (track)	5:12.0		+	Antanas Grigaliūnas	LTU	10.755 (17.308)	N/A	12 May 1990		Vilnius	LTU			
Mile walk (track)	5:31.08			Tom Bosworth	GBR	10.874 (17.499)	N/A	9 Jul 2017	London Grand Prix	London	GBR			
3000 m walk (track)	10:47.11			Giovanni De Benedictis	ITA	10.370 (16.690)	1209	19 May 1990		San Giovanni Valdarno	ITA			
5000 m walk (track)	18:02.38			Gabriel Bordier	FRA	10.333 (16.630)	1221	10 Jun 2025		Montreuil	FRA			
5 km walk (road)	18:21			Robert Korzeniowski	POL	10.159 (16.349)	1194	15 Sep 1990		Bad Salzdetfurth	GER			
10,000 m walk (track)	37:23.99			Gabriel Bordier	FRA			2 Aug 2025	French Championships	Talence	FRA			
10 km walk (road)	37:11			Roman Rasskazov	RUS	10.027 (16.136)	1252	28 May 2000		Saransk	RUS			P
30 km walk (road)	2:05:06			Nathan Deakes	AUS	8.941 (14.389)	1227	27 Aug 2006	Australian Race Walking Championships	Hobart	AUS			
50-mile walk (road)	7:44:47.2		(Note: 7:23:50 by other sources)	Shaul Ladany	ISR	6.455 (10.388)	N/A	1972		New Jersey	USA			
4 × 110 y relay	38.6		A (Note: Team University of Southern California)	Earl McCullouch; Fred Kuller; O. J. Simpson; Lennox Miller (JAM)		23.316 (37.524)	N/A	17 Jun 1967	NCAA Division I Championships	Provo, Utah	USA			
Swedish relay	1:46.59		(Note: Team Puma Reggae Leg 1 (100 m) Christopher Williams Leg 2 (200 m) Usain Bolt Leg 3 (300 m) Davian Clarke Leg 4: (400 m) Jermaine Gonzales)	Christopher Williams; Usain Bolt; Davian Clarke; Jermaine Gonzales	JAM	20.986 (33.774)	N/A	25 Jul 2006	DN Galan	Stockholm	SWE			
Sprint medley relay (2-2-4-8)	3:10.76			Carl Lewis; Ferran Tyler; Benny Hollis; Johnny Gray	USA	18.762 (30.195)	N/A	6 Apr 1985		Tempe	USA			
4 × mile relay	15:49.08			Eamonn Coghlan; Ray Flynn; Frank O'Mara; Marcus O'Sullivan	IRL	15.173 (24.418)	N/A	17 Aug 1985		Dublin	IRL			
4 × 110 m shuttle hurdle relay	52.94		(Note: Team USA Blue)	Jason Richardson (hurdler); Aleec Harris; Aries Merritt; David Oliver	USA	18.592 (29.921)	N/A	25 Apr 2015	Drake Relays	Des Moines	USA			

==== Women ====
Event	Perf.	W	N	Athlete(s)	Nat.	Avg speed (mph, kph)	Pts	Date	Meeting	Location	Ctry.	R	V	P
50 m	5.93	−0.1	+	Marion Jones	USA	18.86 (30.35)	N/A	22 Aug 1999	World Championships	Seville	ESP			
60 m	6.83	+0.4	+	Shelly-Ann Fraser-Pryce	JAM	19.65 (31.63)	N/A	10 Aug 2022	Monaco Diamond League	Monaco	MON			
100 y	9.91	+1.1	+	Veronica Campbell-Brown	JAM	20.64 (33.22)	N/A	31 May 2011	Golden Spike Ostrava	Ostrava	CZE			
150 m	16.09	+0.2	+	Shericka Jackson	JAM	20.85 (33.56)	N/A	8 Sep 2023	Memorial van Damme	Brussels	BEL			
150 m	16.41	+1.1		Brianna Rollins-McNeal	USA	20.45 (32.91)	N/A	20 Jul 2020	AP Ranch High-Performance Invitational	Fort Worth	USA			
150 m straight	15.85	+2.0		Favour Ofili	NGR	21.17 (34.07)	N/A	17 May 2025	Adidas Games	Atlanta	USA			
200 m straight	21.76	+0.5		Shaunae Miller-Uibo	BAH	20.56 (33.09)	N/A	4 Jun 2017	Boost Boston Games	Somerville	USA			
300 m	34.14		+	Marita Koch	GDR	19.657 (31.634)	N/A	6 Oct 1985	World Cup	Canberra	AUS			
300 m	34.41			Shaunae Miller-Uibo	BAH	19.503 (31.386)	1269	20 June 2019	Golden Spike Ostrava	Ostrava	CZE			
500 m	1:05.9			Tatana Kocembova	TCH	16.972 (27.314)	N/A	2 Aug 1984		Ostrava	CZE			
600 m	1:21.63			Mary Moraa	KEN	16.523 (26.591)	1248	1 Sep 2024	ISTAF Berlin	Berlin	GER			
1600 m	4:06.20c			Faith Kipyegon	KEN	14.537 (23.396)	N/A	21 Jul 2023	Herculis	Monaco	MON			
3200 m	8:55.45c			Meseret Defar	ETH	13.369 (21.515)	N/A	14 Sep 2007	Memorial Van Damme	Brussels	BEL			
Two miles	8:58.58			Meseret Defar	ETH	13.369 (21.515)	1238	14 Sep 2007	Memorial Van Damme	Brussels	BEL			
4 miles (road)	19:14			Viola Kibiwot	KEN	12.478 (20.082)	N/A	13 Oct 2013	4 Mile of Groningen	Groningen	NED			
8 km (road)	24:30		+	Mary Keitany	KEN	12.174 (19.592)	N/A	18 Feb 2011	RAK Half Marathon	Ras al-Khaimah	UAE			
12 km (road)	38:05			Brillian Kipkoech	KEN	11.748 (18.906)	N/A	19 May 2019	FNB Cape Town 12 ONERUN	Cape Town	RSA			
15 km (road)	44:15		Mx +	Agnes Jebet Ngetich	KEN	12.638 (20.339)	1277	27 Oct 2024	Valencia Half Marathon	Valencia	ESP			
15 km (road)	44:20		Mx	Letesenbet Gidey	ETH	12.614 (20.300)	1274	17 Nov 2019	Zevenheuvelenloop	Nijmegen	NED			
15 km (road)	46:24		Wo +	Joyciline Jepkosgei	KEN	12.053 (19.397)	1207	17 Oct 2020	World Athletics Half Marathon Championships	Gdynia	POL			
10 miles (road)	50:05		+	Mary Keitany	KEN	11.98 (19.28)	1203	18 Feb 2011	RAK Half Marathon	Ras al-Khaimah	UAE			
10 miles (road)	49:53		Wo	Taylor Roe	USA	12.028 (19.357)	1209	6 Apr 2025	USA 10 Mile Road Running Championships	Washington	USA			
10 miles (road)	49:21		+ a	Brigid Kosgei	KEN	12.158 (19.567)	1225	8 Sep 2019	Great North Run	Newcastle upon Tyne–South Shields	GBR			
10 miles (road)	49:21		+	Tsigie Gebreselama	ETH	12.158 (19.567)	1225	11 Jan 2026	Houston Half Marathon	Houston	USA			
10 miles (road)	49:21		+	Fentaye Belayneh	ETH	12.158 (19.567)	1225	11 Jan 2026	Houston Half Marathon	Houston	USA			
20,000 m (track)	1:05:26.6			Tegla Loroupe	KEN	11.394 (18.337)	N/A	3 Sep 2000		Borgholzhausen	GER			
20 km (road)	59:35		Mx +	Letesenbet Gidey	ETH	12.514 (20.140)	1279	24 Oct 2021	Valencia Half Marathon	Valencia	ESP			
20 km (road)	1:02:04		Wo +	Peres Jepchirchir	KEN	12.014 (19.334)	1222	17 Oct 2020	World Athletics Half Marathon Championships	Gdynia	POL			
20 km (road)	1:01:56		Wo +	Agnes Ngetich	KEN	12.039 (19.375)	1225	20 Sep 2026	World Road Running Championships	Copenhagen	DEN			
25,000 m (track)	1:27:05.84			Tegla Loroupe	KEN	10.701 (17.222)	N/A	21 Sep 2002		Mengerskirchen	GER			
25 km (road)	1:16:17		Mx +	Ruth Chepngetich	KEN	12.218 (19.663)	1270	13 Oct 2024	Chicago Marathon	Chicago	USA			
25 km (road)	1:18:48		Wo +	Hellen Obiri	KEN	11.828 (19.036)	1225	26 Apr 2026	London Marathon	London	GBR			
25 km (road)	1:18:48		Wo +	Joyciline Jepkosgei	KEN	11.828 (19.036)	1225	26 Apr 2026	London Marathon	London	GBR			
25 km (road)	1:18:48		Wo +	Tigst Assefa	ETH	11.828 (19.036)	1225	26 Apr 2026	London Marathon	London	GBR			
30,000 m (track)	1:45:50.00			Tegla Loroupe	KEN	10.568 (17.008)	N/A	6 Jun 2003		Warstein	GER			
30 km (road)	1:31:49		Mx +	Ruth Chepngetich	KEN	12.181 (19.604)	1286	13 Oct 2024	Chicago Marathon	Chicago	USA			
30 km (road)	1:35:21		Wo +	Tigst Assefa	ETH	11.730 (18.878)	1235	26 Apr 2026	London Marathon	London	GBR			
30 km (road)	1:35:21		Wo +	Joyciline Jepkosgei	KEN	11.730 (18.878)	1235	26 Apr 2026	London Marathon	London	GBR			
30 km (road)	1:35:21		Wo +	Hellen Obiri	KEN	11.730 (18.878)	1235	26 Apr 2026	London Marathon	London	GBR			
35 km (road)	1:47:32		Mx +	Ruth Chepngetich	KEN	12.134 (19.528)	N/A	13 Oct 2024	Chicago Marathon	Chicago	USA			
35 km (road)	1:47:32		Mx +	Tigst Assefa	ETH	12.134 (19.528)	N/A	27 Sep 2026	Berlin Marathon	Berlin	GER			
35 km (road)	1:51:38		Wo +	Hellen Obiri	KEN	11.689 (18.812)	N/A	26 Apr 2026	London Marathon	London	GBR			
35 km (road)	1:51:38		Wo +	Tigst Assefa	ETH	11.689 (18.812)	N/A	26 Apr 2026	London Marathon	London	GBR			
35 km (road)	1:51:38		Wo +	Joyciline Jepkosgei	KEN	11.689 (18.812)	N/A	26 Apr 2026	London Marathon	London	GBR			
40 km (road)	2:03:11		Mx +	Ruth Chepngetich	KEN	12.106 (19.483)	N/A	13 Oct 2024	Chicago Marathon	Chicago	USA			
40 km (road)	2:03:00		Mx +	Tigst Assefa	ETH	12.124 (19.512)	N/A	27 Sep 2026	Berlin Marathon	Berlin	GER			
40 km (road)	2:08:27		Wo +	Tigst Assefa	ETH	11.610 (18.684)	N/A	26 Apr 2026	London Marathon	London	GBR			
40 km (road)	2:08:27		Wo +	Hellen Obiri	KEN	11.610 (18.684)	N/A	26 Apr 2026	London Marathon	London	GBR			
40 km (road)	2:08:27		Wo +	Joyciline Jepkosgei	KEN	11.610 (18.684)	N/A	26 Apr 2026	London Marathon	London	GBR			
50 miles (road)	5:31:56			Courtney Olsen	USA	9.038 (14.545)	N/A	9 Nov 2024	Tunnel Hill 50 Mile	Vienna	USA			
100 miles (road)	12:42:40			Camille Herron	USA	7.867 (12.661)	N/A	11 Nov 2017	Tunnel Hill 100 Mile	Vienna	USA			
12-hour run (track)	149,130 m		+	Camille Herron	USA	7.722 (12.428)	N/A	9 Dec 2017	Desert Solstice Track Invitational	Phoenix	USA			
12-hour run (road)	153,600 m			Satu Lipiäinen	FIN	7.954 (12.800)	N/A	20 May 2023		Kokkola	FIN			
24-hour run (road)	270,116 m			Camille Herron	USA	6.993 (11.255)	N/A	26–27 Oct 2019	IAU 24 Hour World Championship	Albi	FRA			
48-hour run (road)	435,366 m			Camille Herron	USA	5.636 (9.070)	N/A	25–27 Mar 2023	Sri Chinmoy 48 Hour Festival	Bruce	AUS			
200 m hurdles (bend)	24.8	+0.4	h	Yadisleidy Pedroso	ITA	18.040 (29.032)	N/A	6 Apr 2013		Caserta	ITA			
200 m hurdles (bend)	25.6	−0.7	h	Patricia Girard	FRA	17.476 (28.125)	N/A	23 Aug 2001		Nantes	FRA			
200 m hurdles (bend)	25.79	−0.6		Lauren Wells	AUS	17.347 (27.918)	N/A	21 Jan 2017	AACT Combined Events Championships	Canberra	AUS			
200 m hurdles (straight)	24.86	+0.1		Shiann Salmon	JAM	17.996 (28.962)	N/A	23 May 2021	Adidas Boost Boston Games	Boston	USA			
300 m hurdles	36.86			Femke Bol	NED	18.206 (29.300)	N/A	31 May 2022	Ostrava Golden Spike	Ostrava	CZE			
Mile steeplechase	4:40.13			Winfred Yavi	BHR	12.851 (20.682)	N/A	22 Aug 2025	Memorial Van Damme	Brussels	BEL			
2000 m steeplechase	5:47.42			Beatrice Chepkoech	KEN	12.877 (20.724)	1242	10 Sep 2023	Hanžeković Memorial	Zagreb	CRO			
Tetradecathlon	10798 pts			Milla Kelo	FIN		N/A	8 Sep 2002		Turku	FIN			
3000 m walk (track)	11:48.24			Ileana Salvador	ITA	9.475 (15.249)	1186	29 Aug 1993		Padua	ITA			
5000 m walk (track)	20:01.80			Eleonora Giorgi	ITA	9.307 (14.978)	1219	18 May 2014	Italian Clubs League Meet	Misterbianco	ITA			
5 km walk (road)	19:46			Kjersti Plätzer	NOR	9.431 (15.177)	1239	27 Aug 2006	Internationaler Geher-Cup	Hildesheim	GER			
10 km walk (road)	41:04			Yelena Nikolayeva	RUS	9.078 (14.610)	1228	20 Apr 1996	Russian Championships	Sochi	RUS			P
30 km walk (road)	2:19:53			Rebecca Henderson	AUS	7.996 (12.868)	N/A	18 May 2025		Melbourne	AUS			
Sprint medley relay (1–1–2–4)	1:35.20		(Note: Leg 1 (100 m) Destinee Brown Leg 2 (100 m) Aaliyah Brown Leg 3 (200 m) Kimberlyn Duncan Leg 4 (400 m) Raevyn Rogers 50.48)	Destinee Brown; Aaliyah Brown; Kimberlyn Duncan; Raevyn Rogers	USA	18.798 (30.252)	N/A	28 Apr 2018	Penn Relays	Philadelphia	USA			
Swedish relay (1–2–3–4)	2:01.10		(Note: Leg 1 (100 m) Marina Zhirova Leg 2 (200 m) Yelena Mizera Leg 3 (300 m) Yelena Ruzina Leg 4 (400 m) Tatyana Alekseyeva)	Marina Zhirova; Yelena Mizera; Yelena Ruzina; Tatyana Alekseyeva	RUS	18.457 (29.703)	N/A	5 June 1993		Portsmouth	GBR			
Sprint medley relay (2-2-4-8)	3:34.56		(Note: Leg 1 (200 m) Sherri-Ann Brooks Leg 2 (200 m) Rosemarie Whyte Leg 3 (400 m) Moya Thompson 51.7 Leg 4 (800 m)Kenia Sinclair 1:57.43)	Sherri-Ann Brooks; Rosemarie Whyte; Moya Thompson; Kenia Sinclair	JAM	16.681 (26.846)	N/A	1 Apr 2009	Penn Relays	Philadelphia	USA			
4 × mile relay	18:39.58			Brenda Bushnell; Leann Warren; Kathy Hayes; Claudette Groenendaal	USA	12.862 (20.699)	N/A	5 May 1985		Eugene	USA			
4 × 100 m hurdles relay	50.50			Brianna Rollins; Dawn Harper-Nelson; Queen Harrison; Kristi Castlin	USA	17.718 (28.515)	N/A	24 Apr 2015	Drake Relays	Des Moines	USA			

==== Mixed ====
Event	Perf.	N	Athlete(s)	Nat.	Avg speed (mph, kph)	Pts	Date	Meeting	Location	Ctry.	R	V	P
Marathon race walk relay	2:50:31	(Note: World Athletics does not officially recognize records in the marathon mixed race walk relay. Listed is the fastest time recorded at the 2024 Summer Olympics.)	Álvaro Martín; María Pérez	ESP	9.226 (14.847)	N/A	7 Aug 2024	Olympic Games	Paris	FRA			
Shuttle hurdle relay	54.27		AK Sloboda, Varaždin; Roko Farkaš; Klara Koščak; Janko Kišak; Jana Koščak	CRO			4 May 2024	Croatian Relay Championships	Zagreb	CRO			

=== Indoor events ===
==== Men ====
Event	Perf.	N	Athlete(s)	Nat.	Avg speed (mph, kph)	Pts	Date	Meeting	Location	Ctry.	R	V	P
30 m	3.81		Churandy Martina	NED	17.614 (28.347)	N/A	14 Nov 2008	Domino Day	Amsterdam	NED			
40 y	4.12	(Note: This performance was in a test comparable to ones commonly used in American football. Coleman's hands are clearly off the ground at a time of 0.04 and so if conducted under "athletics" rules it would have been a false start)	Christian Coleman	USA	19.9 (32.0)	N/A	2 May 2017	Trial	Knoxville	USA			
50 y	5.22		Stanley Floyd	USA	19.59 (31.53)	N/A	22 Jan 1982	Sunkist Meet	Los Angeles	USA			
50 y	5.15	X	Ben Johnson	CAN	19.86 (31.96)	N/A	29 Jan 1988	Toronto Challenge	Toronto	CAN			
50 y	5.0	h	Kirk Clayton	USA	20.5 (32.9)	N/A	10 Jan 1970	Calgary International	Calgary	CAN			
50 y	5.0	h	Herb Washington	USA	20.5 (32.9)	N/A	2 Feb 1972	Maple Leaf Garden Indoor Games	Toronto	CAN			
50 y	5.0	h	Mel Pender	USA	20.5 (32.9)	N/A	4 Mar 1972	Orlando Collegiate Indoor Championships	Orlando	USA			
50 y	5.0	h	Mel Pender	USA	20.5 (32.9)	N/A	18 Mar 1972	Highlanders Indoor Track Meet	Hamilton	CAN			
50 y	5.0	h	Herb Washington	USA	20.5 (32.9)	N/A	4 Feb 1973	Toronto Star-Maple Leaf Indoor Games	Toronto	CAN			
50 y	5.0	h	Manfred Ommer	FRG	20.5 (32.9)	N/A	14 Mar 1975		Leverkusen	FRG			
60 y	5.8	h	Herb Washington	USA	21.2 (34.1)	N/	12 Feb 1972	Michigan State Relays	East Lansing	USA			
60 y	5.8	hA	Mel Pender	USA	21.2 (34.1)	N/A	25 May 1973	Western Airlines Pro Track Classic	Salt Lake City	USA			
55 m	5.99	A	Obadele Thompson	BAR	20.54 (33.06)	1268	22 Feb 1997	WAC Indoor Championships	Colorado Springs	USA			
70 y	6.8	h	Mel Pender	USA	21.1 (33.9)	N/A	27 Feb 1965	Mason-Dixon Games	Louisville	USA			
70 y	6.8	h	Craig Wallace	USA	21.1 (33.9)	N/A	27 Feb 1965	Mason-Dixon Games	Louisville	USA			
70 y	6.8	h	Larry Highbaugh	USA	21.1 (33.9)	N/A	14 Feb 1970	Mason-Dixon Games	Louisville	USA			
70 y	6.8	h	Jim Green	USA	21.1 (33.9)	N/A	14 Feb 1970	Mason-Dixon Games	Louisville	USA			
70 y	6.8	h	Mel Pender	USA	21.1 (33.9)	N/A	13 Feb 1971	Mason-Dixon Games	Louisville	USA			
70 y	6.8	h	Jean-Louis Ravelomanantsoa	MAD	21.1 (33.9)	N/A	1 Jun 1973	ITA meeting	Louisville	USA			
70 y	6.8	h	Warren Edmondson	USA	21.1 (33.9)	N/A	1 Jun 1973	ITA meeting	Louisville	USA			
70 y	6.8	h	Harrington Jackson	USA	21.1 (33.9)	N/A	1 Jun 1973	ITA meeting	Louisville	USA			
100 m	9.98		Usain Bolt	JAM	22.41 (36.07)	N/A	23 Aug 2014	Kamila Skolimowska Memorial	Warsaw	POL			
150 m	14.99		Donovan Bailey	CAN	22.38 (36.02)	N/A	1 Jun 1997	Bailey–Johnson 150-metre race	Toronto	CAN			
300 y	29.27		Terron Wright	USA	20.965 (33.739)	N/A	7 Feb 1981	Indiana Invitational	Bloomington	USA			
300 m	31.56		Steven Gardiner	BAH	21.264 (34.221)	1260	28 Jan 2022	South Carolina Invitational	Columbia	USA			
500 y	53.9	hA	Larry James	USA	18.98 (30.54)	N/A	25 May 1973	ITA meet	Salt Lake City	USA			
500 m	59.83	(Note: Roddie Haley ran 59.82 at Oklahoma City on 15 Mar 1986 but the track was subsequently found to have been measured incorrectly)	Abdalelah Haroun	QAT	18.694 (30.085)	1204	17 Feb 2016	Globen Galan	Stockholm	SWE			
600 y	1:05.75		Jenoah McKiver	USA	18.666 (30.040)	N/A	18 Jan 2025	Corky Classic	Lubbock	USA			P
600 m	1:12.84		Josh Hoey	USA	18.426 (29.654)	1319	6 Dec 2025	Sharon Colyear-Danville Season Opener	Boston	USA			
1000 y	2:04.39		Johnny Gray	USA	16.444 (26.464)	N/A	23 Feb 1986	Michelob Invitational	San Diego	USA			
1600 m	3:43.83c		Jakob Ingebrigtsen	NOR	15.990 (25.734)	N/A	13 Feb 2025	Meeting Hauts-de-France Pas-de-Calais	Liévin	FRA			
2000 m	4:48.79		Hobbs Kessler	USA	15.492 (24.932)	1293	24 Jan 2026	New Balance Indoor Grand Prix	Boston	USA			
3200 m	7:57.88c		Josh Kerr	GBR	14.979 (24.106)	N/A	11 Feb 2024	Millrose Games	New York City	USA			
Two miles	8:00.67		Josh Kerr	GBR	14.979 (24.107)	1310	11 Feb 2024	Millrose Games	New York City	USA			
10,000 m	27:50.29		Mark Bett	KEN	13.393 (21.553)	1087	10 Feb 2002	Indoor Flanders Meeting	Ghent	BEL			
Marathon	2:19:01		Malcolm Richards	USA	11.316 (18.212)	N/A	17 Mar 2018	The Armory Indoor Marathon	New York City	USA			
2000 m steeplechase	5:13.77		Paul Kipsiele Koech	KEN	14.258 (22.947)	N/A	13 Feb 2011	Indoor Flanders Meeting	Ghent	BEL			
3000 m steeplechase	8:17.46		Aleksandr Zagoruyko	URS	13.490 (21.710)	N/A	21 Feb 1982		Moscow	URS			
50 y hurdles	5.88		Greg Foster	USA	17.393 (27.992)	N/A	17 Jan 1986	Sunkist Invitational	Los Angeles	USA			
60 y hurdles	6.82		Renaldo Nehemiah	USA	17.995 (28.961)	N/A	30 Jan 1982		Dallas	USA			
55 m hurdles	6.89	(Note: Originally reported as 6.88 and subsequently corrected to 6.89)	Renaldo Nehemiah	USA	17.857 (28.737)	1254	20 Jan 1979		New York City	USA			
110 m hurdles	13.34		Allen Johnson	USA	18.446 (29.685)	N/A	14 Feb 1995		Moscow	RUS			
300 m hurdles	34.26	OT	Karsten Warholm	NOR	19.588 (31.524)	N/A	10 Feb 2018	Avoimet Pirkanmaan	Tampere	FIN			
400 m hurdles	48.78		Félix Sánchez	DOM	18.343 (29.520)	N/A	18 Feb 2012	Meeting National Val-de-Reuil	Val-de-Reuil	FRA			
High jump (indoor)	2.43 m		Javier Sotomayor	CUB		1296	4 Mar 1989	World Championships	Budapest	HUN			P
Pole vault (indoor)	6.31 m		Armand Duplantis	SWE		1353	12 Mar 2026	Mondo Classic	Uppsala	SWE			P
Long jump (indoor)	8.79 m		Carl Lewis	USA		1311	27 Jan 1984	Millrose Games	New York City	USA			
Triple jump (indoor)	18.07 m		Hugues Fabrice Zango	BUR		1279	16 Jan 2021		Aubière	FRA			
Shot put (indoor)	22.82 m		Ryan Crouser	USA		1290	24 Jan 2021	American Track League	Fayetteville	USA			
Discus throw (indoor)	69.51 m		Gerd Kanter	EST		N/A	22 Mar 2009	World Record Indoor Challenge	Växjö	SWE			
Weight throw (indoor)	26.35 m	A	Daniel Haugh	USA		N/A	16 Feb 2024	USA Championships	Albuquerque	USA			
Javelin throw (indoor)	85.78 m		Matti Närhi	FIN		N/A	3 Mar 1996		Kajaani	FIN			
1500 m walk	5:03.18	+	Ever Jair Palma Olivares	MEX	11.067 (17.811)		8 Feb 2025	USA 1 Mile Race Walking Championships	New York City	USA			
Mile walk	5:24.50		Ever Jair Palma Olivares	MEX	11.094 (17.854)		8 Feb 2025	USA 1 Mile Race Walking Championships	New York City	USA			
3000 m walk	10:30.28		Tom Bosworth	GBR	10.647 (17.135)	1257	25 Feb 2018	Glasgow Grand Prix	Glasgow	GBR			
Two miles walk	11:54.50		Valdas Kazlauskas	URS	10.077 (16.217)	N/A	24 Feb 1990		Kaunas	URS			
5000 m walk	18:03.83		Sergey Shirobokov	RUS	10.320 (16.608)	1224	10 Mar 2022		Yaroslavl	RUS			
10,000 m walk	38:31.4	(Note: Some sources list 38:23.73 by Wang Zhen as indoor world best, but that race took place on Villa Gentile which is a regular outdoor track.)	Werner Heyer	GDR	9.678 (15.575)	N/A	12 Jan 1980		East Berlin	GDR			
15,000 m walk	1:00:03.9		Valdas Kazlauskas	URS	9.310 (14.984)	N/A	24 Jan 1987		Kaunas	URS			
20,000 m walk	1:20:40.0	OT	Ronald Weigel	GDR	9.244 (14.876)	N/A	27 Jan 1980		Senftenberg	GDR			
Sprint medley relay (2-2-4-8)	3:15.10	(Note: Leg 1 Mark Everett 1:48.4 Leg 2 James Trapp 20.20 Leg 3 Kevin Little 20.7 Leg 4 Butch Reynolds 45.8)	Mark Everett; James Trapp; Kevin Little; Butch Reynolds	USA	18.345 (29.523)	N/A	14 Mar 1993	World Indoor Championships	Toronto	CAN			
Distance medley relay	9:19.42	(Note: Leg 1 Cole Hocker 2:49.89 Leg 2 Luis Peralta 47.29 Leg 3 Charlie Hunter 1:47.65 Leg 4 Cooper Teare 3:54.61)	Cole Hocker; Luis Peralta; Charlie Hunter; Cooper Teare	USA; DOM; AUS; USA	15.995 (25.741)	N/A	29 Jan 2021	Razorback Invitational	Fayetteville	USA			
4 × mile relay	16:03.68	(Note: Team Brooks)	David Ribich (4:08.2); Henry Wynne (4:01.4); Brannon Kidder (3:56.8); Izaic Yorks (3:57.2)	USA	14.943 (24.048)	N/A	26 Jan 2019	Dr. Sander Columbia Challenge	New York City	USA			
4 × 60 y shuttle hurdle relay	27.6	A (Note: US Air Force)	T.G. Parker; Joe Kahiapo; Ahart Powers; Dick McIntosh	USA	17.787 (28.625)	N/A	21 Feb 1975		Colorado Springs	USA			

==== Women ====
Event	Perf.	N	Athlete(s)	Nat.	Avg speed (mph, kph)	Pts	Date	Meeting	Location	Ctry.	R	V	P
50 y	5.74	(Note: Angela Issajenko equalled the time of 5.74 on 29 Jan 1988 in Toronto but the mark was rescinded following her subsequent admission of long-term drug use.)	Evelyn Ashford	USA	17.82 (28.68)	N/A	18 Feb 1983	San Diego Indoor Games	San Diego	USA			
60 y	6.54		Evelyn Ashford	USA	18.766 (30.200)	N/A	26 Feb 1982	USA Indoor Track and Field Championships	New York City	USA			
60 y	6.54		Jeanette Bolden	USA	18.766 (30.200)	N/A	21 Feb 1986	Times-GTE Indoor Games	Los Angeles	USA			
55 m	6.56		Gwen Torrence	USA	18.755 (30.183)	1202	14 Mar 1987	NCAA	Oklahoma City	USA			
100 y	10.15		Heike Drechsler	GDR	20.152 (32.432)	N/A	8 Feb 1987		Senftenberg	GDR			
100 m	11.15		Marita Koch	GDR	20.062 (32.287)	N/A	12 Jan 1980		East Berlin	GDR			
300 y	32.63		Merlene Ottey	JAM	18.806 (30.265)	N/A	13 Mar 1982	AIAW National Indoor Championships	Cedar Falls	USA			
300 m	35.45		Irina Privalova	RUS	18.930 (30.465)	1250	17 Jan 1993		Moscow	RUS			
300 m	35.45		Shaunae Miller-Uibo	BAH	18.930 (30.465)	1250	3 Feb 2018	Millrose Games	New York City	USA			
500 y	1:00.61	A	Jearl Miles-Clark	USA	16.874 (27.156)	N/A	19 Feb 2000	Simplot Games	Pocatello	USA			
500 m	1:05.63		Femke Bol	NED	17.042 (27.427)	1234	4 Feb 2023	New Balance Indoor Grand Prix	Boston	USA			
600 y	1:16.76	A	Michaela Rose	USA	15.988 (25.731)	N/A	20 Jan 2024	Corky Classic	Lubbock	USA			
600 m	1:23.41		Keely Hodgkinson	GBR	16.091 (25.896)	1215	28 Jan 2023	Manchester World Indoor Tour	Manchester	GBR			
1000 y	2:23.5		Joetta Clark	USA	14.254 (22.940)	N/A	9 Mar 1986	Florida Fast Time Invitational	Gainesville	USA			
1600 m	4:11.84c		Genzebe Dibaba	ETH	14.212 (22.872)	N/A	17 Feb 2016	Globen Galan	Stockholm	SWE			
2000 m	5:23.75		Genzebe Dibaba	ETH	13.819 (22.239)	1257	7 Feb 2017	Míting Internacional de Catalunya	Sabadell	ESP			
3200 m	8:57.35c		Genzebe Dibaba	ETH	13.322 (21.439)	N/A	15 Feb 2014	Aviva Indoor Grand Prix	Birmingham	GBR			
Two miles	9:00.48		Genzebe Dibaba	ETH	13.322 (21.439)	1257	15 Feb 2014	Aviva Indoor Grand Prix	Birmingham	GBR			
10,000 m	32:44.97		Olga Michurina	RUS	11.384 (18.321)	N/A	23 Dec 1995		Saint Petersburg	RUS			
Marathon	2:40:55		Lindsey Scherf	USA	9.776 (15.733)	N/A	17 Mar 2018	The Armory Indoor Marathon	New York City	USA			
55 m hurdles	7.30	A (Note: Mark was set during a pentathlon competition.)	Tiffany Lott-Hogan	USA	16.854 (27.123)	1190	22 Feb 1997 (Note: by World Athletics source; February 20, 1997 by Track and Field News & BYU Cougars sources)	WAC Indoor Championship	Colorado Springs	USA			
100 m hurdles	12.64		Ludmila Engquist	SWE	17.697 (28.481)	N/A	10 Feb 1997		Tampere	FIN			
300 m hurdles	40.09	OT	Stine Tomb	NOR	16.739 (26.939)	N/A	5 Feb 2011	Finland-Sweden-Norway Indoor Match	Tampere	FIN			
400 m hurdles	56.41		Sheena Tosta	USA	15.862 (25.527)	N/A	12 Feb 2011	Meeting National	Val-de-Reuil	FRA			
2000 m steeplechase	5:47.79		Maruša Mišmaš	SLO	12.864 (20.702)	N/A	19 Feb 2020	Meeting Hauts de France Pas de Calais	Liévin	FRA			
3000 m steeplechase	9:07.00		Tatyana Petrova	RUS	12.268 (19.744)	N/A	17 Feb 2006		Moscow	RUS			
3000 m steeplechase	9:54.2	(Note: This is the fastest indoor steeplechase with a water-jump.)	Marcela Lustigova	CZE	11.294 (18.176)	N/A	11 Feb 2010	Botnia Games	Korsholm	FIN			
High jump (indoor)	2.08 m		Kajsa Bergqvist	SWE		1299	4 Feb 2006	Hochsprung mit Musik	Arnstadt	GER			
Pole vault (indoor)	5.03 m	# (Note: Insufficient or no doping control.)	Jenn Suhr	USA		1280	30 Jan 2016	Golden Eagle Multi and Invitational	Brockport	USA			P
Pole vault (indoor)	5.02 m	A	Jenn Suhr	USA		1277	2 Mar 2013	USA Championships	Albuquerque	USA			P
Long jump (indoor)	7.37 m		Heike Drechsler	GDR		1300	13 Feb 1988		Vienna	AUT			
Triple jump (indoor)	15.74 m		Yulimar Rojas	VEN		1297	20 Mar 2022	World Championships	Belgrade	SRB			
Shot put (indoor)	22.50 m		Helena Fibingerová	TCH		1364	19 Feb 1977		Jablonec	TCH			
Discus throw (indoor)	65.23 m	Mx	Shanice Craft	GER		N/A	10 Feb 2023	ISTAF Indoor	Berlin	GER			
Weight throw (indoor)	26.02 m	A	Deanna Price	USA		N/A	17 Feb 2023	USA Championships	Albuquerque	USA			
Javelin throw (indoor)	57.75 m	(Note: Current design.)	Anna Wessman	SWE		N/A	10 Mar 2012	World Indoor Throwing	Växjö	SWE			
Javelin throw (indoor)	61.29 m	(Note: Old design.)	Taina Uppa	FIN		N/A	28 Feb 1999		Korsholm	FIN			
Mile walk	6:16.72		Sada Eidikytė	URS	9.556 (15.379)	N/A	24 Feb 1990		Kaunas	URS			
3000 m walk	11:35.34		Gillian O'Sullivan	IRL	9.651 (15.532)	1217	15 Feb 2003		Belfast	GBR			
Two miles walk	13:11.88		Ileana Salvador	ITA	9.092 (14.633)	N/A	14 Feb 1990		Genoa	ITA			
5000 m walk	19:53.61		Lyudmyla Olyanovska	UKR	9.370 (15.080)	1229	27 Feb 2026	Ukrainian Championships	Kyiv	UKR			
10,000 m walk	43:54.63		Yelena Ginko	BLR	8.491 (13.664)	1126	22 Feb 2008	Belarusian Championships	Mogilev	BLR			
4 × 100 m relay	44.39		Anne-Kathrin Elbe; Anne Möllinger; Cathleen Tschirch; Marion Wagner	GER	20.157 (32.440)	N/A	31 Jan 2010	BW-Bank Meeting	Karlsruhe	GER			
Sprint medley relay (2-2-4-8)	3:45.90	(Note: Leg 1 (800 m) Joetta Clark Diggs 2:08.7 Leg 2 (200 m) Wendy Vereen 22.6 Leg 3 (200 m) Kim Batten 23.3 Leg 4 (400 m) Jearl Miles Clark 51.3)	Joetta Clark Diggs; Wendy Vereen; Kim Batten; Jearl Miles Clark	USA	15.844 (25.498)	N/A	14 Mar 1993	World Indoor Championships	Toronto	CAN			
Distance medley relay	10:33.85	(Note: Leg 1 (1200 m) Heather McLean 3:14.92 Leg 2 (400 m) Kendall Ellis 52.04 Leg 3 (800 m) Roisin Willis 2:03.29 Leg 4 (1600 m) Elle Purrier St. Pierre 4:23.60)	Heather McLean; Kendall Ellis; Roisin Willis; Elle Purrier St. Pierre	USA	14.117 (22.718)	N/A	15 Apr 2022		Boston	USA			

=== Combined event disciplines ===
World Athletics recognises world bests achieved in individual disciplines during a combined event. The below list includes disciplines in the decathlon (men) and heptathlon (women). Athletes must score at least 7000 points in a decathlon in order to have their performance recognised.

==== Men ====
Event	Perf.	N	Athlete(s)	Nat.	Avg speed (mph, kph)	Dec. pts	Date	Meeting	Location	Ctry.	R	V
100 metres	10.12		Damian Warner	CAN	22.104 (35.573)	1066	25 May 2019	Hypo-Meeting	Götzis	AUT		
Long jump	8.45 m		Simon Ehammer	SUI		1178	28 May 2022	Hypo-Meeting	Götzis	AUT		
Shot put	19.17 m		Edy Hubacher	SUI		1048	5 Oct 1969		Bern	SUI		
High jump	2.28 m		Derek Drouin	CAN		1071	7 Apr 2017	Sam Adams Combined Events Invitational	Santa Barbara	USA		
High jump	2.28 m	(Note: Mark was set during a heptathlon competition.)	Aleksandr Shustov	RUS		1071	27 Feb 2012		Belgorod	RUS		
400 metres	45.00		Ashton Eaton	USA	19.884 (32.000)	1060	28 Aug 2015	World Championships	Beijing	CHN		
110 m hurdles	13.36		Damian Warner	CAN	18.418 (29.641)	1059	30 May 2021	Hypo-Meeting	Götzis	AUT		
Discus throw	57.70 m		Leo Neugebauer	GER		1032	6 Jun 2024	NCAA Outdoor Championships	Eugene	USA		
Pole vault	5.76 m		Tim Lobinger	GER		1152	16 Sep 1999		Leverkusen	GER		
Javelin throw	79.80 m		Peter Blank	GER		1040	19 Jul 1992		Emmelshausen	GER		
1500 metres	3:58.7	h	Robert Baker	USA	14.057 (22.623)	963	3 Apr 1980		Austin	USA		

==== Women ====
Event	Perf.	N	Athlete(s)	Nat.	Avg speed (mph, kph)	Hep. pts	Date	Meeting	Location	Ctry.	R	V
100 m hurdles	12.54		Jessica Ennis	GBR	17.838 (28.708)	1195	3 Aug 2012	Olympic Games	London	GBR		
High jump	2.02 m		Nafissatou Thiam	BEL		1264	22 Jun 2019	Décastar	Talence	FRA		
Shot put	20.79 m		Eva Wilms	FRG		1252	28 Aug 1977		Hanover	FRG		
200 metres	22.30		Jackie Joyner-Kersee	USA	20.062 (32.287)	1150	15 Jul 1988		Indianapolis	USA		
Long jump	7.27 m		Jackie Joyner-Kersee	USA		1264	23 Sep 1988	Olympic Games	Seoul	KOR		
Javelin throw	60.90 m		Barbora Špotáková	CZE		1072	16 Sep 2012	Décastar	Talence	FRA		
800 metres	2:01.23		Anna Hall	USA	14.762 (23.757)	1097	1 Jun 2025	Hypo-Meeting	Götzis	AUT		

== Running records by race distance ==
View source data.
View source data.

== Javelin specifications ==
The men's javelin specification was changed with effect from 1986, and the women's from 2000. The purpose was to reduce the number of illegal flat landings, but a side-effect was to reduce the distance travelled. The prior world records in individual men's and women's javelin were invalidated, but the prior records in decathlon and heptathlon were not.

The old specification records for men's and women's javelin were as follows:

Event	Record	Athlete	Nat.	Pts	Date	Meeting	Location	Ctry.	Ref.
Men's	104.80 m	Uwe Hohn	GDR	N/A	20 Jul 1984		East Berlin	GDR	
Women's	80.00 m	Petra Felke	GDR	N/A	9 Sep 1988		Potsdam	GDR	

=== Combined events ===
The current decathlon world record was set with the current javelin specification.

The best performance in heptathlon using the new specification javelin is:

Performance	Athlete	Nat.	Pts	Date	Meeting	Location	Ctry.	Ref.
7032	Carolina Klüft	SWE	1279	26 Aug 2007	World Championships	Osaka	JPN	
100m H (wind) / High jump / Shot put / 200m (wind) / Long jump (wind) / Javelin / 800m; 13.15 (+0.1 m/s) / 1.95 m / 14.81 m / 23.38 (+0.3 m/s) / 6.85 m (+1.0 m/s) / 47.98 m (Note: This is 2.32 m farther than the distance thrown by Jackie Joyner-Kersee during her world record-setting heptathlon performance of 23–24 September 1988, despite Klüft using the new specification javelin.) / 2:12.56
7032	Anna Hall	USA	1279	1 Jun 2025	Hypo-Meeting	Götzis	AUT	
100m H (wind) / High jump / Shot put / 200m (wind) / Long jump (wind) / Javelin / 800m; 13.19 (−1.0 m/s) / 1.95 m / 14.86 m / 23.37 (+0.5 m/s) / 6.44 m (−0.1 m/s) / 46.16 m / 2:01.23

The best javelin throw in a heptathlon was also set using the old specification:

Performance	Athlete	Nat.	Hep. pts	Date	Meeting	Location	Ctry.	Ref.
64.64 m	Tessa Sanderson	GBR	1145	12 Jul 1981		Brussels	BEL	

== See also ==
- World record
- Index of sport of athletics record progressions
- List of Olympic records in athletics
- List of world under-20 records in athletics
- List of world records in masters athletics
- List of IPC world records in athletics
