= 1964 USA Indoor Track and Field Championships =

National athletics championship event

- Dates: February 22 (men); April 11–12 (women)
- Host city: New York City, New York, United States (men); Akron, Ohio, United States (women)
- Venue: Madison Square Garden (men); Stile Athletics Field House (women)
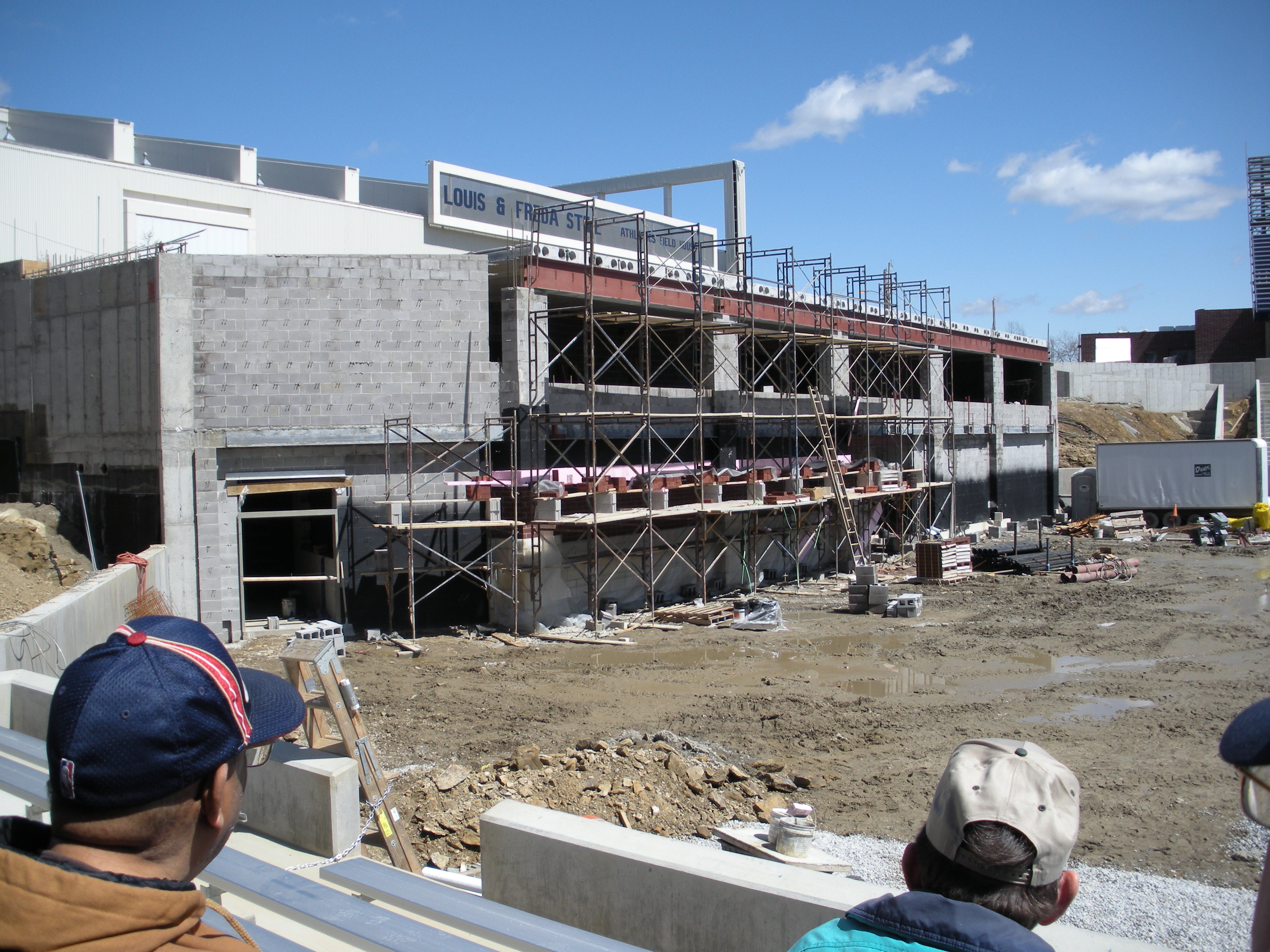
- Level: Senior
- Type: Indoor
- Events: 22 (12 men's + 10 women's)

The 1964 USA Indoor Track and Field Championships were organized by the Amateur Athletic Union (AAU) and served as the national championships in indoor track and field for the United States.

The men's edition was held at Madison Square Garden in New York City, New York, and it took place February 22. The women's meet was held separately at the Stile Athletics Field House in Akron, Ohio, taking place April 11–12.

It was the last time that the men's and women's championships were held separately, with all future editions being held at the same venue and date. At the championships, Bob Hayes broke the six-second barrier in the 60 yards. Ron Clarke also broke the indoor 3 miles world record in 13:18.4.

Separate from the women's 50-yard hurdles championship in April, there was a women's 50-yard hurdles exhibition race held during the men's championships that was won by Tammy Davis in 6.7 seconds.

== Medal summary ==
=== Men ===
Event	Gold		Silver		Bronze
60 yards	Bob Hayes	5.9			
600 yards	Charles Buchta	1:12.1			
1000 yards	Ernie Cunliffe	2:14.8			
Mile run	Ergas Leps (CAN)	4:09.6	Victor Zwolak	4:10.5	
3 miles	Ron Clarke (AUS)	13:18.4	Pete McArdle	13:32.6	
60 yards hurdles	Hayes Jones	7.0			
High jump	John Thomas	2.16 m			
Pole vault	John Uelses	4.72 m			
Long jump	Charles Mays	7.96 m			
Shot put	Gary Gubner	19.26 m			
Weight throw	Al Hall	20.01 m			
1 mile walk	Ron Laird	6:22.7			

=== Women ===
Event	Gold		Silver		Bronze
50 yards	Debbie Thompson	5.8			
100 yards	Willye White	11.8			
220 yards	Valerie Carter	26.0			
440 yards	Valerie Carter	60.0			
880 yards	Sandra Knott	2:19.7			
50 yards hurdles	Jenny Wingerson (CAN)	6.7	Mary Rose	7.3	
High jump	Eleanor Montgomery	1.65 m			
Standing long jump	Beverly Beckwith	2.70 m			
Shot put	Sharon Sheppard	13.64 m			
Basketball throw	Shirley McCondichie	101 ft 0 in (30.78 m)			
