= Annie Smith (athlete) =

American long jumper

Personal information
- Born: April 23, 1939 (age 87) Atlanta, United States

Sport
- Sport: Athletics
- Event: Long jump

Anna Lois Smith (born April 23, 1939) is an American athlete. She competed in the women's long jump at the 1960 Summer Olympics.

Competing for the Tennessee State Lady Tigers track and field team, Smith won the exhibition 440 yards at the 1958 USA Indoor Track and Field Championships.
