= 5K run world record progression =

The following table shows the progression of world bests and world records in the 5K run, as recognised by the IAAF. The 5K run is a new event, having been introduced as a world record event in 2017.

== Men ==
=== World Bests (prior to IAAF recognition) ===
| Time | Athlete | Date | Place | Ref. |
|---|---|---|---|---|
| 14:19 | Luigi Conti (ITA) | 23 September 1960 | Bologna, Italy | |
| 13:56 | Carlos Lopes (POR) | 18 February 1973 | Seia, Portugal | |
| 13:31 | Mike McLeod (GBR) | 4 April 1984 | Newcastle, United Kingdom | |
| 13:31 | Steve Scott (USA) | 27 March 1988 | Carlsbad, United States | |
| 13:26 | Yobes Ondieki (KEN) | 2 April 1989 | Carlsbad, United States | |
| 13:12 | William Mutwol (KEN) | 29 March 1992 | Carlsbad, United States | |
| 13:00 | Sammy Kipketer (KEN) | 26 March 2000 | Carlsbad, United States | |

=== World Records ===
Key:
- pending ratification by World Athletics Incomplete information Not ratified or later rescinded by World Athletics

| Time | Athlete | Date | Place | Ref. |
|---|---|---|---|---|
| 13:30 + | Bernard Kibet Lagat (KEN) | 8 September 2018 | Prague, Czech Republic | |
| 13:29 | Julien Wanders (SUI) | 17 February 2019 | Monaco | |
| 13:29 | Edward Cheserek (KEN) | 7 April 2019 | Carlsbad, United States | |
| 13:22 | Robert Keter (KEN) | 9 November 2019 | Lille, France | |
| 13:18 | Rhonex Kipruto (KEN) | 12 January 2020 | Valencia, Spain | |
| 12:51 | Joshua Cheptegei (UGA) | 16 February 2020 | Monaco | |
| 12:49 | Berihu Aregawi (ETH) | 31 December 2021 | Barcelona | |

== Women ==
=== World Bests (prior to IAAF recognition) ===
| Time | Athlete | Date | Place | Ref. |
|---|---|---|---|---|
| 16:16 | Julie Shea (USA) | 20 September 1981 | Jersey City, United States | |
| 16:08 | Mary Shea (USA) | 14 February 1982 | Raleigh, United States | |
| 15:29 | Lorraine Moller (NZL) | 31 October 1982 | Woodland Hills, United States | |
| 15:29 | Grete Waitz (NOR) | 20 October 1984 | West Lafayette, United States | |
| 15:26 | Liz McColgan (GBR) | 20 December 1987 | Derry, United Kingdom | |
| 15:20 | Lynn Williams (CAN) | 2 April 1989 | Carlsbad, United States | |
| 15:11 | Liz McColgan (GBR) | 14 April 1991 | Carlsbad, United States | |
| 15:10 | Elana Meyer (RSA) | 16 October 1994 | Providence, United States | |
| 15:05 | Rose Cheruiyot (KEN) | 2 April 1995 | Carlsbad, United States | |
| 14:58 | Lydia Cheromei (KEN) | 8 June 1997 | Bern, Switzerland | |
| 14:57 | Paula Radcliffe (GBR) | 2 September 2001 | London, England | |
| 14:54 | Deena Drossin (USA) | 7 April 2002 | Carlsbad, United States | |
| 14:54 | Birhane Adere (ETH) | 13 April 2003 | Carlsbad, United States | |
| 14:51 | Paula Radcliffe (GBR) | 14 September 2003 | London, England | |
| 14:47 | Lornah Kiplagat (NED) | 28 March 2004 | Brunssum, Netherlands | |
| 14:46 | Meseret Defar (ETH) | 9 April 2006 | Carlsbad, United States | |
| 14:32+ | Joyciline Jepkosgei (KEN) | 9 September 2017 | Prague, Czech Republic | |

=== World Records ===
| Time | Athlete | Date | Place | Ref. |
|---|---|---|---|---|
| 14:48 + | Caroline Kipkurui (KEN) | 8 September 2018 | Prague | |
| 14:44 Wo | Sifan Hassan (NED) | 17 February 2019 | Monaco | |
| 14:43 Mx | Beatrice Chepkoech (KEN) | 14 February 2021 | Monaco | |
| 14:41 Mx (Note: Not ratified by World Athletics due to lack of international judges.) (Note: Not ratified by World Athletics due to lack of doping control.) | Beth Potter (GBR) | 3 April 2021 | Barroford | |
| 14:39 Mx (Note: uncertified course) | Karoline Bjerkeli Grøvdal (NOR) | 1 May 2021 | Sør-Odal | |
| 14:29 Wo | Senbere Teferi (ETH) | 12 September 2021 | Herzogenaurach | |
| 14:19 Mx | Ejgayehu Taye (ETH) | 31 December 2021 | Barcelona | |
| 14:25+ Wo (Note: Ngetich's women's-only record was not certified after World Athletics determined the course was 25 meters too short.) | Agnes Ngetich (KEN) | 10 September 2023 | Brașov | |
| 14:13 Wo | Beatrice Chebet (KEN) | 31 December 2023 | Barcelona | |
| 14:13 + Mx | Agnes Ngetich (KEN) | 14 January 2024 | Valencia | |
| 13:54 Mx | Beatrice Chebet (KEN) | 31 December 2024 | Barcelona | |
