= 1954 USA Indoor Track and Field Championships =

National athletics championship event

- Dates: February 20 (men); March 27 (women)
- Host city: New York City, New York, United States
- Venue: Madison Square Garden (men); 102nd Engineers Armory (women)
- Level: Senior
- Type: Indoor
- Events: 20 (12 men's + 8 women's)

The 1954 USA Indoor Track and Field Championships were organized by the Amateur Athletic Union (AAU) and served as the national championships in indoor track and field for the United States.

The men's edition was held at Madison Square Garden in New York City, New York, and it took place February 20. The women's meet was held at the 2nd Engineers Armory on March 27.

Three world records were set at the men's championships. Federal Bureau of Investigation employee Horace Ashenfelter won the men's 3 miles. Though his 3-mile time was not a record, his 4000 m split of 11:27.4 broke Paavo Nurmi's 1925 record at that distance. About 12,000 spectators attended the men's edition.

The Chicago C.Y.O. won the women's team title.

== Medal summary ==
=== Men ===
Event	Gold		Silver	Bronze
60 yards	John Haines	6.2		
600 yards	Reggie Pearman	1:11.4		
1000 yards	Mal Whitfield	2:11.0		
Mile run	Josy Barthel (LUX)	4:11.7	Fred Wilt	
3 miles	Horace Ashenfelter	13:56.7		
60 yards hurdles	Jack Davis	7.3		
High jump	Herman Wyatt	2.04 m		
Pole vault	Jerry Welbourn	4.50 m		
Long jump	Neville Price (SAF)	7.45 m	George Brown	
Shot put	Parry O'Brien	18.08 m		
Weight throw	Bob Backus	19.33 m		
1 mile walk	Henry Laskau	6:31.7		

=== Women ===
Event	Gold		Silver	Bronze
50 yards	Mabel "Dolly" Landry	6.1	Margaret Davis	Barbara Lee
100 yards	Barbara Jones	11.5	Mae Faggs	Dolores Dwyer
220 yards	Mae Faggs	26.5	Alfrancis Lyman	Betty MacDonnell
50 yards hurdles	Barbara Mueller	7.4	Lenore Leiser	Jean Wolskie
High jump	Barbara Mueller	1.49 m	Veronica Lewis	none awarded
High jump	Barbara Mueller	1.49 m	Marion Boos	none awarded
Standing long jump	Cynthia Lane	2.40 m	Virginia Nagle	Mary Burns
Shot put	Paula Deubel	12.18 m	Ramona Massey	Amelia Bert
Basketball throw	Catherine Walsh	104 ft 3 1/2 in (31.78 m)	Ann Marie Flynn	Joan Stoufer
