= 1958 USA Indoor Track and Field Championships =

National athletics championship event

- Dates: February 22 (men); March 22 (women)
- Host city: New York City, New York, United States (men); Akron, Ohio, United States (women)
- Venue: Madison Square Garden (men); Stile Athletics Field House (women)
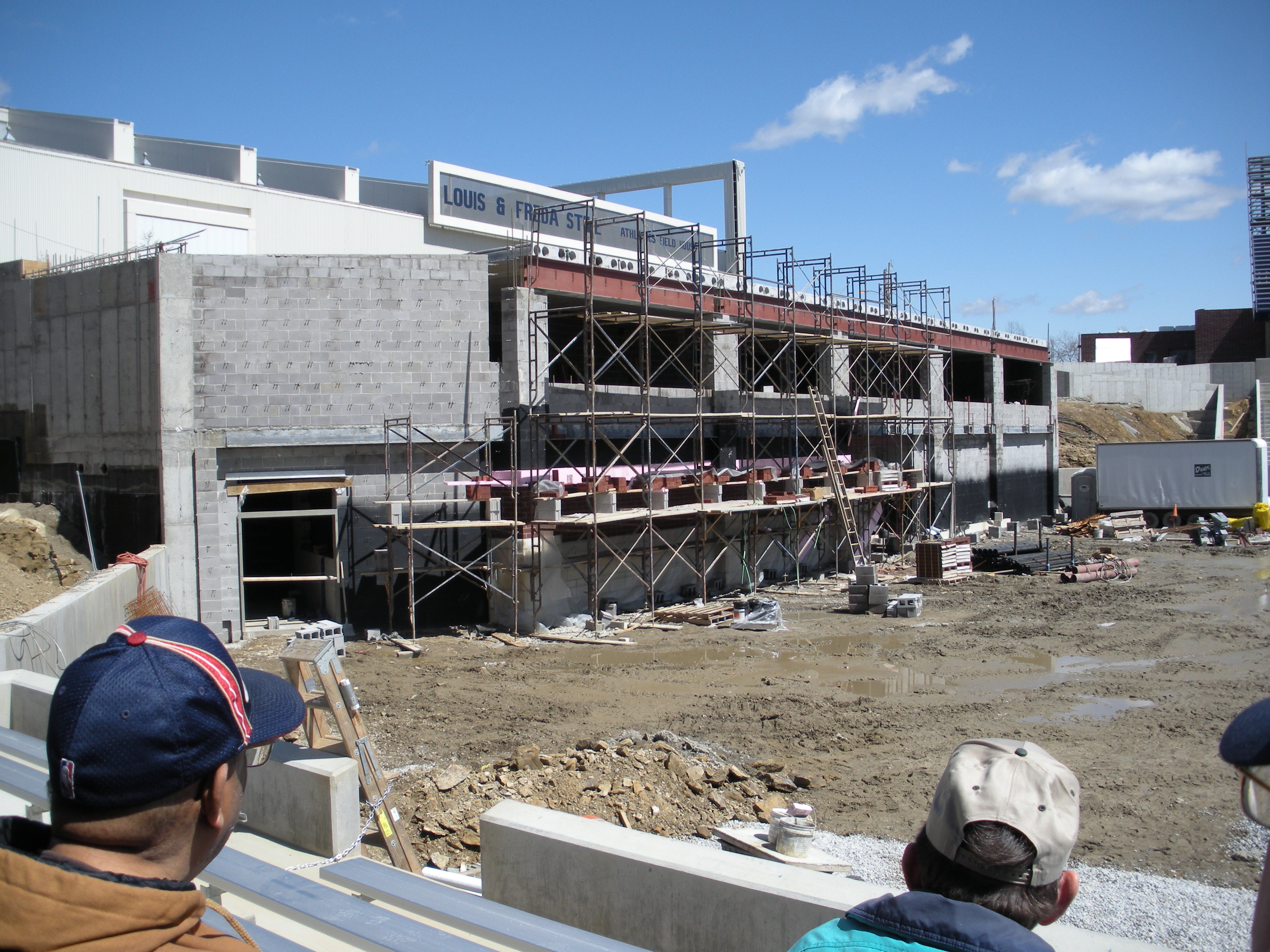
- Level: Senior
- Type: Indoor
- Events: 18 (12 men's + 6 women's)

The 1958 USA Indoor Track and Field Championships were organized by the Amateur Athletic Union (AAU) and served as the national championships in indoor track and field for the United States.

The men's edition was held at Madison Square Garden in New York City, New York, and it took place February 22. The women's meet was held separately at the Stile Athletics Field House in Akron, Ohio, taking place March 22.

At the championships, Ed Collymore of Villanova upset to win the men's 60 yards while semi-final winner Dave Sime scratched in the finals.

The Tennessee State squad won the women's team title.

== Medal summary ==
=== Men ===
Event	Gold		Silver	Bronze
60 yards	Ed Collymore	6.2		
600 yards	Charles Jenkins Sr.	1:11.3		
1000 yards	Zbigniew Orywał (POL)	2:14.1	Joe Soprano	
Mile run	Ron Delany (IRL)	4:03.7	Istvan Rozsavolgyi (HUN)	James Grelle
3 miles	Veliša Mugoša (YUG)	13:54.2	John Macy	Gordon McKenzie
60 yards hurdles	Hayes Jones	7.1		
High jump	Herman Wyatt	2.02 m		
Pole vault	Don Bragg	4.57 m		
Pole vault	Bob Gutowski	4.57 m		
Long jump	Greg Bell	7.75 m		
Shot put	Parry O'Brien	18.32 m		
Weight throw	Bob Backus	19.92 m		
1 mile walk	John Humcke	6:55.5		

=== Women ===
Event	Gold		Silver	Bronze
50 yards	Isabelle Daniels	5.8		
100 yards	Barbara Jones	11.9		
220 yards	Isabelle Daniels	26.2		
440 yards (Note: Exhibition event)	Ann Smith	1:07		
880 yards (Note: Exhibition event)	Grace Butcher	2:48.6		
50 yards hurdles	Shirley Crowder	7.0		
High jump	Barbara Brown	1.58 m		
High jump	Ann Marie Flynn	1.58 m		
Standing long jump	Shirley Hereford	2.75 m		
Shot put	Earlene Brown	15.08 m		
Basketball throw	Earlene Brown	135 ft 2 in (41.19 m)		
