= 2000 metres world record progression =

The following tables show the world record progression in the men's and women's 2000 metres as ratified by World Athletics.

== Men ==
World Athletics lists twenty-three progressive world records in the 2000 metres for men. The current world record is held by Jakob Ingebrigtsen of Norway, with his time of 4:43.13 set in September 2023.

Time	Athlete	Nationality	Location	Date	Ref
5:30.4 h	John Zander	Sweden	Stockholm	16 June 1918	
5:26.4 h	Paavo Nurmi	Finland	Tampere	4 September 1922	
5:26.0 h	Edwin Wide	Sweden	Stockholm	11 June 1925	
5:24.6 h	Paavo Nurmi	Finland	Kuopio	18 June 1927	
5:23.4 h	Eino Borg	Finland	Viipuri	9 August 1927	
5:21.8 h	Jules Ladoumègue	France	Paris	2 July 1931	
5:20.4 h	Miklós Szabó	Hungary	Budapest	4 October 1936	
5:18.4 h	Henry Jonsson	Sweden	Stockholm	2 July 1937	
5:16.8 h	Archie San Romani	United States	Helsinki	26 August 1937	
5:16.4 h	Gunder Hägg	Sweden	Malmö	21 July 1942	
5:11.8 h	Gunder Hägg	Sweden	Östersund	23 August 1942	
5:07.0 h	Gaston Reiff	Belgium	Brussels	29 February 1948	
5:02.2 h	István Rózsavölgyi	Hungary	Budapest	2 October 1955	
5:01.6 h	Michel Jazy	France	Paris	14 June 1962	
5:01.1 h	Josef Odložil	Czech Republic	Stará Boleslav	8 September 1965	
4:57.8 h	Harald Norpoth	West Germany	Hagen	10 September 1966	
4:56.2 h	Michel Jazy	France	St-Maur	12 October 1966	
4:51.52	John Walker	New Zealand	Oslo	30 June 1976	
4:51.39	Steve Cram	Great Britain	Budapest	4 August 1985	
4:50.81	Saïd Aouita	Morocco	Paris	16 July 1987	
4:47.88	Noureddine Morceli	Algeria	Paris	3 July 1995	
4:44.79	Hicham El Guerrouj	Morocco	Berlin	7 September 1999	
4:43.13	Jakob Ingebrigtsen	Norway	Brussels	8 September 2023	

== Women ==
World Athletics lists six progressive world records in the 2000 metres for women. The current world record is held by Jessica Hull of Australia, with her time of 5:19.70 set in July 2024.

Time	Athlete	Nationality	Location	Date	Ref
5:28.72	Tatyana Kazankina	Soviet Union	Moskva	4 August 1984	
5:28.69	Maricica Puică	Romania	London	11 July 1986	
5:25.36	Sonia O'Sullivan	Ireland	Edinburgh	8 July 1994	
5:23.75	Genzebe Dibaba	Ethiopia	Sabadell	7 February 2017	
5:21.56	Francine Niyonsaba	Burundi	Zagreb	14 September 2021	
5:19.70	Jessica Hull	Australia	Monaco	12 July 2024	
