= 50 metres hurdles =

Distance in hurdling

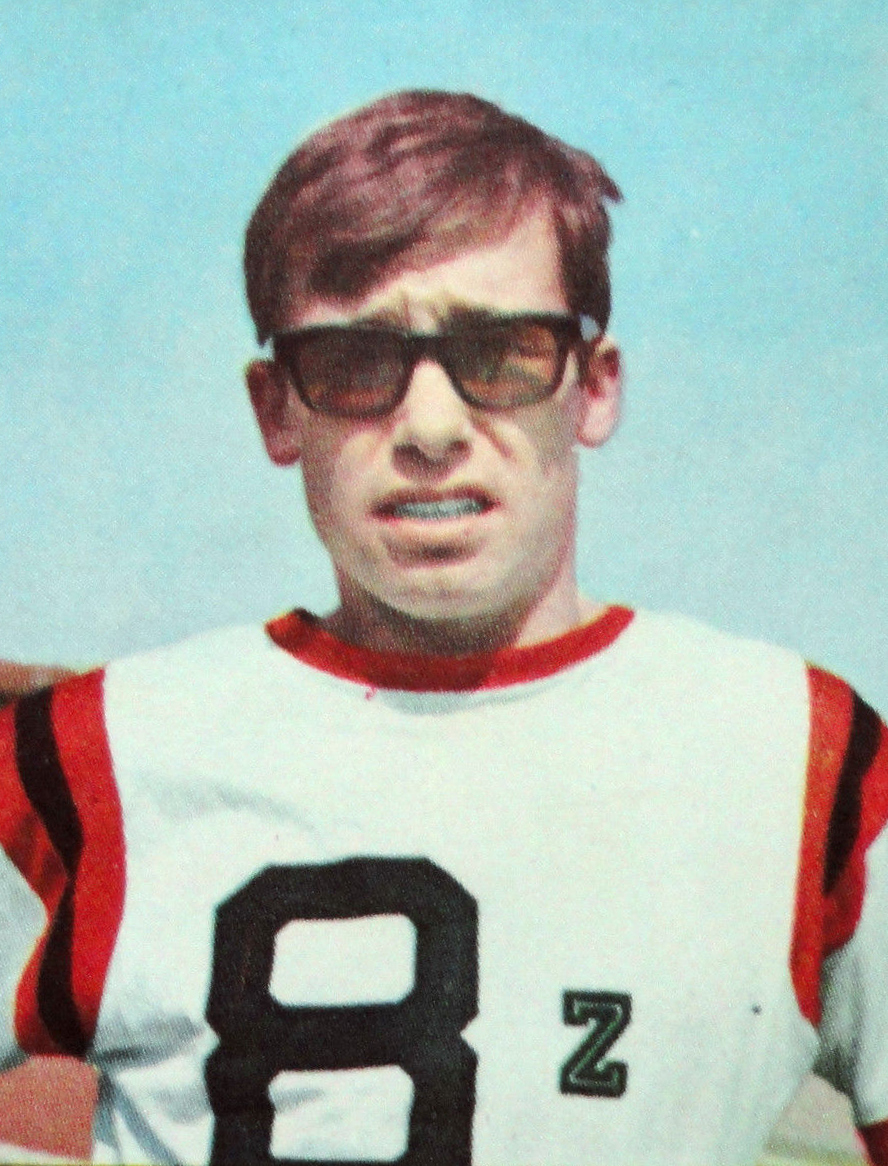
Eddy Ottoz won the gold medal in the 50 m hurdles at the age of 23 at the 1967 European Indoor Games.

50 metres hurdles is a distance in hurdling, usually only run in indoor competitions. Because very few contests are held over the distance, most of the fastest times recorded for the event were set during specially measured and timed races over longer distances, typically the 55 metres hurdles or 60 metres hurdles.

The 50 yards (45.72 m) hurdles is the imperial distance analogue to the 50 meters hurdles. It was contested at the women's USA Indoor Track and Field Championships from 1928 to 1932, 1945 to 1946, 1949 to 1954, 1957 to 1958, and 1964. It was not contested as a men's event. The championship record is 6.7 seconds by Jenny Wingerson.

== All-time top 25 ==
Note: Indoor results only.

- + = Timed recorded by athlete en route to a longer distance
- A = affected by altitude

=== Men ===
- Correct as of February 2025.

| Rank | Time | Athlete | Nation | Date | Place | Ref. |
|---|---|---|---|---|---|---|
| 1 | 6.25 | Mark McKoy | Canada | 5 March 1986 | Kobe | |
| 2 | 6.30+ | Grant Holloway | United States | 13 February 2025 | Liévin | |
| 3 | 6.35 | Greg Foster | United States | 27 January 1985 | Rosemont | |
| 3 | 6.35 | Greg Foster | United States | 31 January 1987 | Ottawa | |
| 4 | 6.36 | Renaldo Nehemiah | United States | 3 February 1979 | Edmonton | |
| 4 | 6.36+ | Duane Ross | United States | 21 February 1999 | Liévin | |
| 4 | 6.36+ | Anier García | Cuba | 13 February 2000 | Liévin | |
| 4 | 6.36+ | Ladji Doucouré | France | 26 February 2005 | Liévin | |
| 8 | 6.37+ | Tony Dees | United States | 13 February 2000 | Liévin | |
| 9 | 6.39+ | Dayron Robles | Cuba | 21 February 2008 | Stockholm | |
| 10 | 6.40 | Colin Jackson | United Kingdom | 5 February 1999 | Budapest | |
| 10 | 6.40+ | Allen Johnson | United States | 26 February 2005 | Liévin | |
| 10 | 6.40+ | Shamar Sands | Bahamas | 10 February 2009 | Liévin | |
| 10 | 6.40+ | Wilhem Belocian | France | 13 February 2025 | Liévin | |
| 14 | 6.41 | Igor Kovác | Czech Republic | 15 February 1992 | Prague | |
| 14 | 6.41 A | Mark Crear | United States | 10 February 1995 | Reno | |
| 16 | 6.42+ | Yoel Hernández | Cuba | 13 February 2000 | Liévin | |
| 17 | 6.43 | Reggie Torian | United States | 13 February 1999 | Los Angeles | |
| 17 | 6.43+ | Jakub Szymański | Poland | 13 February 2025 | Liévin | |
| 19 | 6.44+ | Xiang Liu | China | 28 February 2004 | Liévin | |
| 19 | 6.44+ | Evgeniy Borisov | Russia | 10 February 2009 | Liévin | |
| 19 | 6.44+ | Louis Rollins | United States | 13 February 2025 | Liévin | |
| 22 | 6.45 | Thomas Munkelt | East Germany | 10 February 1979 | Ottawa | |
| 22 | 6.45 | Tonie Campbell | United States | 14 March 1987 | Kobe | |
| 22 | 6.45 | Terrence Trammell | United States | 28 January 2012 | New York City | |
| 25 | 6.46 | Frank Siebeck | East Germany | 3 February 1974 | Berlin | |
| 25 | 6.46 | Sam Turner | United States | 9 March 1985 | Kobe | |
| 25 | 6.46 | Robert Kronberg | Sweden | 4 March 2001 | Sindelfingen | |
| 25 | 6.46+ | Courtney Hawkins | United States | 21 February 1999 | Liévin | |
| 25 | 6.46+ | Stanislavs Olijars | Latvia | 23 February 2003 | Liévin | |

==== Notes ====
Below is a list of other times equal or superior to 6.39:

- Greg Foster also ran 6.37 (1986).
- Renaldo Nehemiah also ran 6.38 (1979).
- Mark McKoy also ran 6.38 (1986), 6.39 (1995).
- Tony Dees also ran 6.38 (1999).
- Anier García also ran 6.39 (2000).

=== Women ===
- Correct as of February 2025.

| Rank | Time | Athlete | Nation | Date | Place | Ref. |
|---|---|---|---|---|---|---|
| 1 | 6.58 | Cornelia Oschkenat | East Germany | 20 February 1988 | Berlin | |
| 2 | 6.65 | Gloria Siebert | East Germany | 20 February 1988 | Berlin | |
| 2 | 6.65 | Ludmila Engquist | Sweden | 7 January 1993 | Grenoble | |
| 4 | 6.67 A | Jackie Joyner-Kersee | United States | 10 February 1995 | Reno | |
| 4 | 6.67+ | Michelle Freeman | Jamaica | 13 February 2000 | Liévin | |
| 4 | 6.67+ | Susanna Kallur | Sweden | 21 February 2008 | Stockholm | |
| 7 | 6.68+ | Ackera Nugent | Jamaica | 13 February 2025 | Liévin | |
| 8 | 6.70 | Olga Shishigina | Kazakhstan | 5 February 1999 | Budapest | |
| 8 | 6.70 | Brigita Bukovec | Slovenia | 5 February 1999 | Budapest | |
| 10 | 6.71+ | Grace Stark | United States | 13 February 2025 | Liévin | |
| 11 | 6.73 | Julie Baumann | Switzerland | 7 January 1993 | Grenoble | |
| 11 | 6.73 | Yuliya Graudyn | Russia | 27 January 1995 | Moscow | |
| 11 | 6.73+ | Laëticia Bapté | France | 13 February 2025 | Liévin | |
| 14 | 6.74 | Anneliese Ehrhardt | East Germany | 4 February 1973 | Berlin | |
| 14 | 6.74 | Zofia Bielczyk | Poland | 21 February 1981 | Grenoble | |
| 16 | 6.75 | Kristin Patzwahl | East Germany | 5 February 1989 | Berlin | |
| 16 | 6.75+ | Josephine Onyia | Spain | 21 February 2008 | Stockholm | |
| 18 | 6.76 | Danuta Perka | Poland | 11 February 1979 | Berlin | |
| 18 | 6.76+ | Patricia Girard | France | 13 February 2000 | Liévin | |
| 18 | 6.76+ | Glory Alozie | Nigeria | 25 February 2001 | Liévin | |
| 21 | 6.77 | Grażyna Rabsztyn | Poland | 11 February 1979 | Berlin | |
| 21 | 6.77 | Yordanka Donkova | Bulgaria | 7 February 1993 | Grenoble | |
| 21 | 6.77+ | Ditaji Kambundji | Switzerland | 13 February 2025 | Liévin | |
| 21 | 6.77+ | Nadine Visser | Netherlands | 13 February 2025 | Liévin | |
| 25 | 6.78+ | Keturah Anderson | Canada | 21 February 1999 | Liévin | |
| 25 | 6.78 | Lolo Jones | United States | 28 January 2012 | New York City | |

==== Notes ====
Below is a list of other times equal or superior to 6.73:

- Cornelia Oschkenat also ran 6.60 (1988), 6.68 (1988), 6.69 (1989), 6.71 (1986, 1987), 6.73 (1986, 1987).
- Gloria Siebert also ran 6.67 (1988), 6.69 (1988), 6.72 (1990).
- Michelle Freeman also ran 6.69+ (2000), 6.72+ (2001).
- Jackie Joyner-Kersee also ran 6.73 A (1996).
