= 2017 IAAF World Relays – Women's 4 × 800 metres relay =

Athletic tracks event in Bahamas

Women's 4 × 800 metres relay at the 2017 IAAF World Relays
- Venue: Thomas Robinson Stadium
- Dates: 22 April (final)
- Competitors: 20 from 5 nations

Medalists
gold medal	Chanelle Price; Chrishuna Williams; Laura Roesler; Charlene Lipsey	United States
silver medal	Darya Barysevich; Ilona Usovich; Viktoria Kushnir; Marina Arzamasova	Belarus
bronze medal	Lora Storey; Abbey de la Motte; Zoe Buckman; Heidi See	Australia

The women's 4 × 800 metres relay at the 2017 IAAF World Relays was held at the Thomas Robinson Stadium on 22 April.

Just before the gun, Kenya's Eglay Nafuna Nalanya flinched, almost disqualifying their team, but she righted herself before the gun. The first runner to the break line was American Chanelle Price who found her way to the front followed closely by Nalanya and Australian Lora Storey. All five teams sorted themselves out into a string, with Poland's Anna Sabat the first to fall behind. After shadowing Price through most of the first leg, Nalanya slowed during the last 150 metres leaving Storey and Belarus' Darya Barysevich as the only chasers. Shortly after the first handoff, Chrishuna Williams broke away for the American team. That lead was temporary as Australian Abbey De La Motte and Belarus' Ilona Usovich not only pulled in the gap but went past Williams. De La Motte continued the momentum and put a gap on both of her pursuers handing off to Zoe Buckman with almost a 10-metre lead. Williams finally put on a strong kick finish to separate from Usovich, slightly pulling in De La Motte's big lead.

During the first 200 metres of the third leg, American Laura Roesler pulled back the lead. With 300 to go in their leg, Roesler passed Buckman with Belarus' Viktoria Kushnir making up the gap behind. During the next 200 metres Roesler opened up a 20-metre lead while Kushnir eased past Buckman. Roesler continued to expand the lead handing off to Charlene Lipsey with over a 30-metre advantage. Kushnir separated from Buckman to hand off to world Champion Marina Arzamasova with a comfortable gap. Through the first lap, Arzamasova brought the gap down to just over 5 metres, with Australian Heidi See in tow 10 metres back. From there, Lipsey began to open the gap again, separating ultimately to a 25-metre victory. See closed the gap down to 4 metres but Arzamasova was stronger on the last 100 metres for a Belarus silver.

== Records ==
Prior to the competition, the records were as follows:

World record	Soviet Union (Nadiya Olizarenko, Lyubov Gurina, Lyudmila Borisova, Irina Podyalovskaya)	7:50.17	Moscow, Soviet Union	5 August 1984
Championship record	United States (Chanelle Price, Geena Lara, Ajee' Wilson, Brenda Martinez)	8:01.58	(The Bahamas) Nassau, Bahamas	25 May 2014
World Leading	(United States) Villanova University (Kelsey Margey, Stephanie Schappert, Siofra Buttner, Angel Piccirillo)	8:26.36	Philadelphia, United States	25 April 2015
African Record	Kenya (Janeth Jepkosgei, Agatha Jeruto Kimaswai, Sylvia Chematui Chesebe, Eunice Jepkoech Sum)	8:04.28	(The Bahamas) Nassau, Bahamas	25 May 2014
Asian Record	China (Liaoning Team); Liu Dong, Chen Yumei, Qu Yunxia, Liu Li	8:16.2	Shanghai, China	3 October 1991
North, Central American and Caribbean record	United States (Chanelle Price, Geena Lara, Ajee' Wilson, Brenda Martinez)	8:01.58	(The Bahamas) Nassau, Bahamas	25 May 2014
South American Record	Brazil (C.R. Flamengo) (Cristiane Barbosa, Cintia Fragoso, Lorena de Oliveira, Ana Paula Pereira)	9:29.10	Rio de Janeiro, Brazil	21 December 2000
European Record	Soviet Union (Nadiya Olizarenko, Lyubov Gurina, Lyudmila Borisova, Irina Podyalovskaya)	7:50.17	Moscow, Soviet Union	5 August 1984
Oceanian record	Australia (Brittany McGowan, Zoe Buckman, Selma Kajan, Melissa Duncan)	8:13.26	(The Bahamas) Nassau, Bahamas	25 May 2014

== Schedule ==
Date	Time	Round
22 April 2017	21:48	Final

All times are local times (UTC-4)

== Results ==
=== Final ===
The final was started at 21:51.

Rank	Lane	Nation	Athletes	Time	Notes	Points
1st place, gold medalist(s)	6	United States	Chanelle Price, Chrishuna Williams, Laura Roesler, Charlene Lipsey	8:16.36	WL	8
2nd place, silver medalist(s)	3	Belarus	Darya Barysevich, Ilona Usovich, Viktoria Kushnir, Marina Arzamasova	8:20.07	SB	7
3rd place, bronze medalist(s)	5	Australia	Lora Storey, Abbey De La Motte, Zoe Buckman, Heidi See	8:21.08	SB	6
4	4	Poland	Anna Sabat, Paulina Mikiewicz-Łapińska, Martyna Galant, Angelika Cichocka	8:24.71	SB	5
5	7	Kenya	Eglay Nafuna Nalyanya, Sylivia Chematui Chesebe, Josphine Chelangat Kiplangat, Emily Cherotich Tuei	8:31.05	SB	4
