= 2015 IAAF World Relays – Women's 4 × 800 metres relay =

Women's 4 × 800 metres relay at the 2015 IAAF World Relays
- Venue: Thomas Robinson Stadium
- Dates: 3 May (final)
- Competitors: 32 from 8 nations

Medalists
gold medal	Chanelle Price; Maggie Vessey; Molly Beckwith-Ludlow; Alysia Johnson Montaño	United States
silver medal	Syntia Ellward; Katarzyna Broniatowska; Angelika Cichocka; Sofia Ennaoui	Poland
bronze medal	Abbey de la Motte; Kelly Hetherington; Selma Kajan; Brittany McGowan	Australia

The women's 4 × 800 metres relay at the 2015 IAAF World Relays was held at the Thomas Robinson Stadium on 3 May.

From the gun, the first runner to the break line was Mexico's Gabriela Medina, but as the athletes sorted themselves, American Chanelle Price found her way to the front followed closely by Cuba's Rose Mary Almanza. On the final straight, Almanza sprinted by giving Cuba several metres at the handoff. Cuba's Arletis Thaureaux's personal best was almost 9 seconds slower than America's Maggie Vessey, so it was fairly easy for Vessey to move into position to mark Thaureaux in the first 200 metres out front. Kenya's Sheila Jepkosgei Chesang sprinted the first 200 metres to make up the gap, following Vessey around Thaureaux and the rest of the field tightened up behind. At the beginning of her second lap, Vessey asserted the lead and opened up a sizable gap. Chesang paid for her exuberance and began to fall back through the field while Simoya Campbell put Jamaica at the head of the chase pack. As Vessey continued to stretch the lead, Campbell was displaced by Poland's Katarzyna Broniatowska, chased by Canada's Rachel François. By the end of her leg, Vessey had a 30-meter gap on the field, Broniatowska handed off in second and flopped to the track, Jamaica's Natoya Goule dodging the body after getting the baton. Chesang's last 200 metres were agony, handing off 14 seconds behind the same Vessey she had challenged earlier, Kenya well out of the running.

Taking the baton from Kelly Hetherington about even with Canada, Australia's Selma Kajan rolled into second place around the turn. Molly Beckwith-Ludlow maintained the American lead while the end of the first lap saw the Australian running shoulder to shoulder with Goule and Poland's Angelika Cichocka with Canada's Elizabeth Whelan just a step behind, challenged by Cuba's Gilda Casanova. Goule eased ahead, with Cichocka the only one to go with her, while Kajan dropped back to battle Casanova and Whelan as a third pack. Ludlow handed off to Alysia Johnson Montaño some 40 metres ahead, while Cichocka sprinted past Goule on the final straight. Known as a front runner, Montaño ran a hard first lap and opened up a huge lead, the entire home straight. Poland's Sofia Ennaoui moved into a clear second place with a line up of Canada's Rachel Aubry, Australia's Brittany McGowan, Cuba's Sahily Diago and Jamaica's Samantha James lined up in that order to chase for the medals. It was McGowan who pushed the final back stretch into the wind and broke away from the group.

At the end Montaño's lead had shrunk back to only about 70 metres, she celebrated waving the baton to the crowd as she finished. More than ten seconds later, Ennaoui finished another couple of seconds ahead of McGowan. Out of the first five teams, only Australia did not set their National Record with this race. The previous American and North American record was from this race the year earlier, so the winning American team set the Championship record and their continental record in the same step. Still this time is more than ten seconds slower than world record, set by a Soviet team in 1984 during the Soviet bloc boycott of the Olympics. It is the number 13 performance of all time, all but two of those performances ahead of it being set before the dissolution of the Soviet Union and those remaining two set by Russia and Romania in the European Relay Festival in Portsmouth, England, an earlier relay festival that was a predecessor to the World Relays concept in June 1993.

== Records ==
Prior to the competition, the records were as follows:

World record	Soviet Union (Nadiya Olizarenko, Lyubov Gurina, Lyudmila Borisova, Irina Podyalovskaya)	7:50.17	Moscow, Soviet Union	5 August 1984
Championship record	United States (Chanelle Price, Geena Lara, Ajee' Wilson, Brenda Martinez)	8:01.58	(The Bahamas) Nassau, Bahamas	25 May 2014
World Leading	(United States) Villanova University (Kelsey Margey, Stephanie Schappert, Siofra Buttner, Angel Piccirillo)	8:26.36	Philadelphia, United States	25 April 2015
African Record	Kenya (Janeth Jepkosgei, Agatha Jeruto Kimaswai, Sylvia Chematui Chesebe, Eunice Jepkoech Sum)	8:04.28	(The Bahamas) Nassau, Bahamas	25 May 2014
Asian Record	China (Liaoning Team); Liu Dong, Chen Yumei, Qu Yunxia, Liu Li	8:16.2	Shanghai, China	3 October 1991
North, Central American and Caribbean record	United States (Chanelle Price, Geena Lara, Ajee' Wilson, Brenda Martinez)	8:01.58	(The Bahamas) Nassau, Bahamas	25 May 2014
South American Record	Brazil (C.R. Flamengo) (Cristiane Barbosa, Cintia Fragoso, Lorena de Oliveira, Ana Paula Pereira)	9:29.10	Rio de Janeiro, Brazil	21 December 2000
European Record	Soviet Union (Nadiya Olizarenko, Lyubov Gurina, Lyudmila Borisova, Irina Podyalovskaya)	7:50.17	Moscow, Soviet Union	5 August 1984
Oceanian record	Australia (Brittany McGowan, Zoe Buckman, Selma Kajan, Melissa Duncan)	8:13.26	(The Bahamas) Nassau, Bahamas	25 May 2014

== Schedule ==
Date	Time	Round
3 May 2015	19:53	Final

All times are local times (UTC-4)

== Results ==
=== Final ===
The final was started at 19:56.

Rank	Lane	Nation	Athletes	Time	Notes
1st place, gold medalist(s)	6	United States	Chanelle Price, Maggie Vessey, Molly Beckwith-Ludlow, Alysia Johnson Montaño	8:00:62	CR, AR, WL
2nd place, silver medalist(s)	2	Poland	Syntia Ellward, Katarzyna Broniatowska, Angelika Cichocka, Sofia Ennaoui	8:11:36	NR
3rd place, bronze medalist(s)	8	Australia	Abbey de la Motte, Kelly Hetherington, Selma Kajan, Brittany McGowan	8:13:97	SB
4	3	Cuba	Rose Mary Almanza, Arletis Thaureaux, Gilda Casanova, Sahily Diago	8:15:84	NR
5	1	Jamaica	Kimarra McDonald, Simoya Campbell, Natoya Goule, Samantha James	8:16:04	NR
6	5	Canada	Karine Belleau-Béliveau, Rachel François, Elizabeth Whelan, Rachel Aubry	8:16.27	SB
7	4	Mexico	Gabriela Medina, Alejandra Pozas, Paola Vázquez, Arantza Hernández	8:30.56	SB
8	7	Kenya	Annet Mwanzi Lukhuyi, Sheila Jepkosgei Chesang, Sylvia Cherop, Eglay Nafuna Nalyanya	8:33.15	SB
