= 2011 World Youth Championships in Athletics – Girls' 800 metres =

Girls' 800 metres at the 2011 World Youth Championships in Athletics
- Venue: Stadium Lille Métropole
- Dates: 7 July (heats); 8 July (semifinal); 10 July (final)
- Competitors: 34
- Winning time: 2:02.64 PB

Medalists
gold medal	Ajeé Wilson	United States
silver medal	Wang Chunyu	China
bronze medal	Jessica Judd	Great Britain

The girls' 800 metres at the 2011 World Youth Championships in Athletics was held at the Stadium Lille Métropole on 7, 8 and 10 July.

== Medalists ==
Gold	Silver	Bronze
Ajeé Wilson; United States	Wang Chunyu; China	Jessica Judd; Great Britain

== Records ==
Prior to the competition, the following records were as follows.

World Youth Best	Wang Yuan (CHN)	1:57.18	Beijing, China	8 September 1993
Championship Record	Cherono Koech (KEN)	2:01.67	Bressanone, Italy	12 July 2009
World Youth Leading	Amy Weissenbach (USA)	2:02.04	Clovis, United States	4 June 2011

== Heats ==
Qualification rule: first 4 of each heat (Q) plus the 4 fastest times (q) qualified.

=== Heat 1 ===
Rank	Lane	Name	Nationality	Time	Notes
1	4	Agatha Jeruto	Kenya	2:07.80	Q, PB
2	2	Manal El-Bahraoui	Morocco	2:08.63	Q
3	3	Sahily Diago	Cuba	2:10.68	Q
4	5	Thato Makhafola	South Africa	2:10.83	Q
5	7	Dagmar Fæster Olsen	Denmark	2:10.98	
6	8	Ailin Funes	Argentina	2:11.50	
7	6	Valērija Linkeviča	Latvia	2:12.65	
8	1	Abike Funmilola Egbeniyi	Nigeria	2:15.30	

=== Heat 2 ===
Rank	Lane	Name	Nationality	Time	Notes
1	3	Alem Gereziher	Ethiopia	2:06.72	Q, PB
2	8	Jessica Judd	Great Britain	2:07.35	Q
3	7	Akiho Fukuzato	Japan	2:07.64	Q, PB
4	1	Julia Zrinyi	Canada	2:08.24	Q, PB
5	6	Camille Laplace	France	2:08.95	q, PB
6	4	Iuliana Chelaru	Romania	2:13.30	
7	2	Marta Frechilla	Spain	2:13.63	
8	5	Domingas Tchiaca	Angola	2:32.78	PB

=== Heat 3 ===
Rank	Lane	Name	Nationality	Time	Notes
1	7	Wang Chunyu	China	2:06.19	Q, PB
2	3	Miho Nakata	Japan	2:07.72	Q
3	5	Amy Weissenbach	United States	2:08.09	Q
4	1	Sofiya Shemsu	Ethiopia	2:10.29	Q
5	4	Betty Strandberg	Sweden	2:10.54	q
6	2	Maria Florea	Romania	2:12.98	
7	6	Sonia Gaskin	Barbados	2:14.66	

=== Heat 4 ===
Rank	Lane	Name	Nationality	Time	Notes
1	8	Ajeé Wilson	United States	2:14.07	Q
2	6	Katie Snowden	Great Britain	2:14.10	Q
3	2	Marleena Eubanks	Jamaica	2:14.32	Q
4	1	Nataliya Pryshchepa	Ukraine	2:14.35	Q
5	3	Sofia Ennaoui	Poland	2:14.73	
6	7	Winta Berhane	Eritrea	2:15.16	PB
7	5	Jenna Westaway	Canada	2:15.34	
8	4	Katrine Reinholdt Rasmussen	Denmark	2:17.37	

=== Heat 5 ===
Rank	Lane	Name	Nationality	Time	Notes
1	1	Christine Gess	Germany	2:09.18	Q
2	3	Olena Sidorska	Ukraine	2:09.27	Q, SB
3	4	Camilla De Bleecker	Belgium	2:09.58	Q
4	6	Simoya Campbell	Jamaica	2:09.62	Q
5	7	Linda Cheruiyot	Kenya	2:09.86	q, PB
6	8	Jenny Blundell	Australia	2:10.72	q
7	5	Halimah Nakaayi	Uganda	2:13.59	
8	2	Emilija Milanović	Serbia	2:16.34	

== Semifinals ==
Qualification rule: first 2 of each heat (Q) plus the 2 fastest times (q) qualified.

=== Heat 1 ===
Rank	Lane	Name	Nationality	Time	Notes
1	5	Wang Chunyu	China	2:05.13	Q, PB
2	4	Christine Gess	Germany	2:05.62	Q
3	3	Alem Gereziher	Ethiopia	2:06.34	q, PB
4	7	Julia Zrinyi	Canada	2:06.78	PB
5	6	Sahily Diago	Cuba	2:08.25	
6	8	Nataliya Pryshchepa	Ukraine	2:08.30	
7	2	Camille Laplace	France	2:09.75	
8	1	Linda Cheruiyot	Kenya	2:11.20	

=== Heat 2 ===
Rank	Lane	Name	Nationality	Time	Notes
1	5	Katie Snowden	Great Britain	2:05.67	Q
2	3	Amy Weissenbach	United States	2:05.84	Q
3	4	Akiho Fukuzato	Japan	2:07.02	PB
4	8	Agatha Jeruto	Kenya	2:07.52	PB
5	7	Jenny Blundell	Australia	2:09.15	
6	2	Thato Makhafola	South Africa	2:12.02	
7	6	Simoya Campbell	Jamaica	2:15.22	
8	1	Sofiya Shemsu	Ethiopia	2:15.58	

=== Heat 3 ===
Rank	Lane	Name	Nationality	Time	Notes
1	4	Ajeé Wilson	United States	2:03.17	Q, PB
2	3	Jessica Judd	Great Britain	2:03.80	Q
3	6	Manal El-Bahraoui	Morocco	2:06.56	q
4	5	Miho Nakata	Japan	2:07.17	
5	2	Olena Sidorska	Ukraine	2:07.20	SB
6	1	Betty Strandberg	Sweden	2:10.90	
7	8	Marleena Eubanks	Jamaica	2:12.47	
8	7	Camilla De Bleecker	Belgium	2:16.40	

== Final ==
Rank	Lane	Name	Nationality	Time	Notes
1st place, gold medalist(s)	3	Ajeé Wilson	United States	2:02.64	PB
2nd place, silver medalist(s)	7	Wang Chunyu	China	2:03.23	PB
3rd place, bronze medalist(s)	5	Jessica Judd	Great Britain	2:03.43	
4	6	Amy Weissenbach	United States	2:03.59	
5	2	Alem Gereziher	Ethiopia	2:04.59	PB
6	1	Manal El-Bahraoui	Morocco	2:04.80	PB
7	8	Katie Snowden	Great Britain	2:05.64	
8	4	Christine Gess	Germany	2:05.66	
