= 2017 IAAF World Relays =

Athletics competition in Nassau, Bahamas

IAAF World Relays Bahamas 2017
- Host city: Nassau, Bahamas
- Events: 9
- Dates: 22–23 April 2017
- Main venue: Thomas Robinson Stadium

The 2017 IAAF World Relays was the third edition of the biennial, global track and field relay competition between nations. It was held April 22–23, 2017, in Nassau, Bahamas.

The distance medley relay, an innovation at the 2015 World Relays, was dropped from this year's schedule. A mixed-gendered 4 × 400 m relay race was introduced.

== Schedule ==
Day 1 – Saturday 22 April
19:35	Women's 4 × 200 m	Heats
19:59	Men's 4 × 100 m	Heats
20:31	Women's 4 × 400 m	Heats
21:12	Men's 4 × 400 m	Heats
21:48	Women's 4 × 800 m	Final
22:12	Men's 4 × 100 m	Final B
22:21	Women's 4 × 200 m	Final
22:36	Men's 4 × 100 m	Final

Day 2 – Sunday 23 April
19:35	Men's 4 × 200 m	Heats
20:00	Women's 4 × 100 m	Heats
20:22	Men's 4 × 400 m	Final B
20:35	Women's 4 × 400 m	Final B
20:47	Men's 4 × 800 m	Final
21:11	Women's 4 × 400 m	Final
21:29	Men's 4 × 200 m	Final
21:46	Women's 4 × 100 m	Final B
21:55	Men's 4 × 400 m	Final
22:13	Women's 4 × 100 m	Final
22:30	Mixed 4 × 400 m	Final

== Results ==
=== Men ===
Event	Gold		Silver		Bronze	
4 × 100 metres relay	United States; LeShon Collins; Mike Rodgers; Ronnie Baker; Justin Gatlin	38.43	Barbados; Mario Burke; Ramon Gittens; Nicholas Deshong; Burkheart Ellis	39.18	China; Tang Xingqiang; Xie Zhenye; Su Bingtian; Liang Jinsheng	39.22
4 × 200 metres relay	Canada; Gavin Smellie; Brendon Rodney; Andre De Grasse; Aaron Brown	1:19.42	United States; Noah Lyles; Jarrion Lawson; Isiah Young; Ameer Webb	1:19.88	Jamaica; Nickel Ashmeade; Oshane Bailey; Rasheed Dwyer; Yohan Blake	1:21.09
4 × 400 metres relay	United States; David Verburg; Tony McQuay; Kyle Clemons; LaShawn Merritt	3:02.13	Botswana; Isaac Makwala; Baboloki Thebe; Onkabetse Nkobolo; Karabo Sibanda	3:02.28	Jamaica; Peter Matthews; Demish Gaye; Martin Manley; Steven Gayle	3:02.86
4 × 800 metres relay	United States; Brannon Kidder; Erik Sowinski; Casimir Loxsom; Clayton Murphy	7:13.16	Kenya; Alfred Kipketer; Kipyegon Bett; Timothy Kitum; Ferguson Cheruiyot Rotich	7:13.70	Poland; Artur Kuciapski; Mateusz Borkowski; Adam Kszczot; Marcin Lewandowski	7:18.74

=== Women ===
Event	Gold		Silver		Bronze	
4 × 100 metres relay	Germany; Alexandra Burghardt; Lisa Mayer; Tatjana Pinto; Rebekka Haase	42.84	Jamaica; Simone Facey; Natasha Morrison; Gayon Evans; Sashalee Forbes	42.95	China; Liang Xiaojing; Wei Yongli; Tao Yujia; Yuan Qiqi	43.11
4 × 200 metres relay	Jamaica; Jura Levy; Shericka Jackson; Sashalee Forbes; Elaine Thompson	1:29.04; CR, NR	Germany; Lara Matheis; Tatjana Pinto; Rebekka Haase; Gina Lückenkemper	1:30.68	United States; Dezerea Bryant; Tiffany Townsend; Felicia Brown; Shalonda Solomon	1:30.87
4 × 400 metres relay	United States; Phyllis Francis; Ashley Spencer; Quanera Hayes; Natasha Hastings	3:24.36	Poland; Małgorzata Hołub; Iga Baumgart; Adrianna Janowicz; Justyna Święty	3:28.28	Jamaica; Janieve Russell; Anneisha McLaughlin-Whilby; Verone Chambers; Stephenie Ann McPherson	3:28.49
4 × 800 metres relay	United States; Chanelle Price; Chrishuna Williams; Laura Roesler; Charlene Lipsey	8:16.36	Belarus; Darya Barysevich; Ilona Vusovich; Viktoria Kushnir; Maryna Arzamasova	8:20.07	Australia; Lora Storey; Abbey de la Motte; Zoe Buckman; Heidi See	8:21.08

=== Mixed ===
Event	Gold		Silver		Bronze	
4 × 400 m relay	Bahamas; Steven Gardiner; Shaunae Miller; Anthonique Strachan; Michael Mathieu	3:14.42	United States; Michael Berry; Jaide Stepter; Paul Dedewo; Claudia Francis	3:17.29	Jamaica; Javere Bell; Ristananna Tracey; Natoya Goule; Jamari Rose	3:20.26

== Medal table ==
* Host nation (Bahamas)

Rank	Nation	Gold	Silver	Bronze	Total
1	United States (USA)	5	2	1	8
2	Jamaica (JAM)	1	1	4	6
3	Germany (GER)	1	1	0	2
4	Bahamas (BAH)*	1	0	0	1
4	Canada (CAN)	1	0	0	1
6	Poland (POL)	0	1	1	2
7	Barbados (BAR)	0	1	0	1
7	Belarus (BLR)	0	1	0	1
7	Botswana (BOT)	0	1	0	1
7	Kenya (KEN)	0	1	0	1
11	China (CHN)	0	0	2	2
12	Australia (AUS)	0	0	1	1
Totals (12 entries)		9	9	9	27

== Team standings ==
Teams scored for every place in the top 8 with 8 points awarded for the first place, 7 for second, etc. The overall points winner was given the Golden Baton.

The host country is highlighted in lavender blue

Rank	Nation	Points
1	United States	60
2	Jamaica	39
3	Australia	24
4	Poland	23
5	Trinidad and Tobago	17
6	Kenya	16
7	China	16
8	Germany	15
9	Bahamas	15
10	France	13

== Participating nations ==
509 athletes from 35 nations are set to take part in the competition.

- Antigua and Barbuda
- ART
- Australia
- Bahamas (host)
- Barbados
- Belarus
- Belgium
- Botswana
- Brazil
- British Virgin Islands
- Canada
- China
- Colombia
- Cuba
- Czech Republic
- Dominican Republic
- Ecuador
- France
- Germany
- Great Britain
- India
- Italy
- Jamaica
- Japan
- Kenya
- Mexico
- Netherlands
- Nigeria
- Poland
- Qatar
- Saint Kitts and Nevis
- Trinidad and Tobago
- Turks and Caicos Islands
- United States
- Venezuela
