= Laura Roesler =

American middle-distance runner

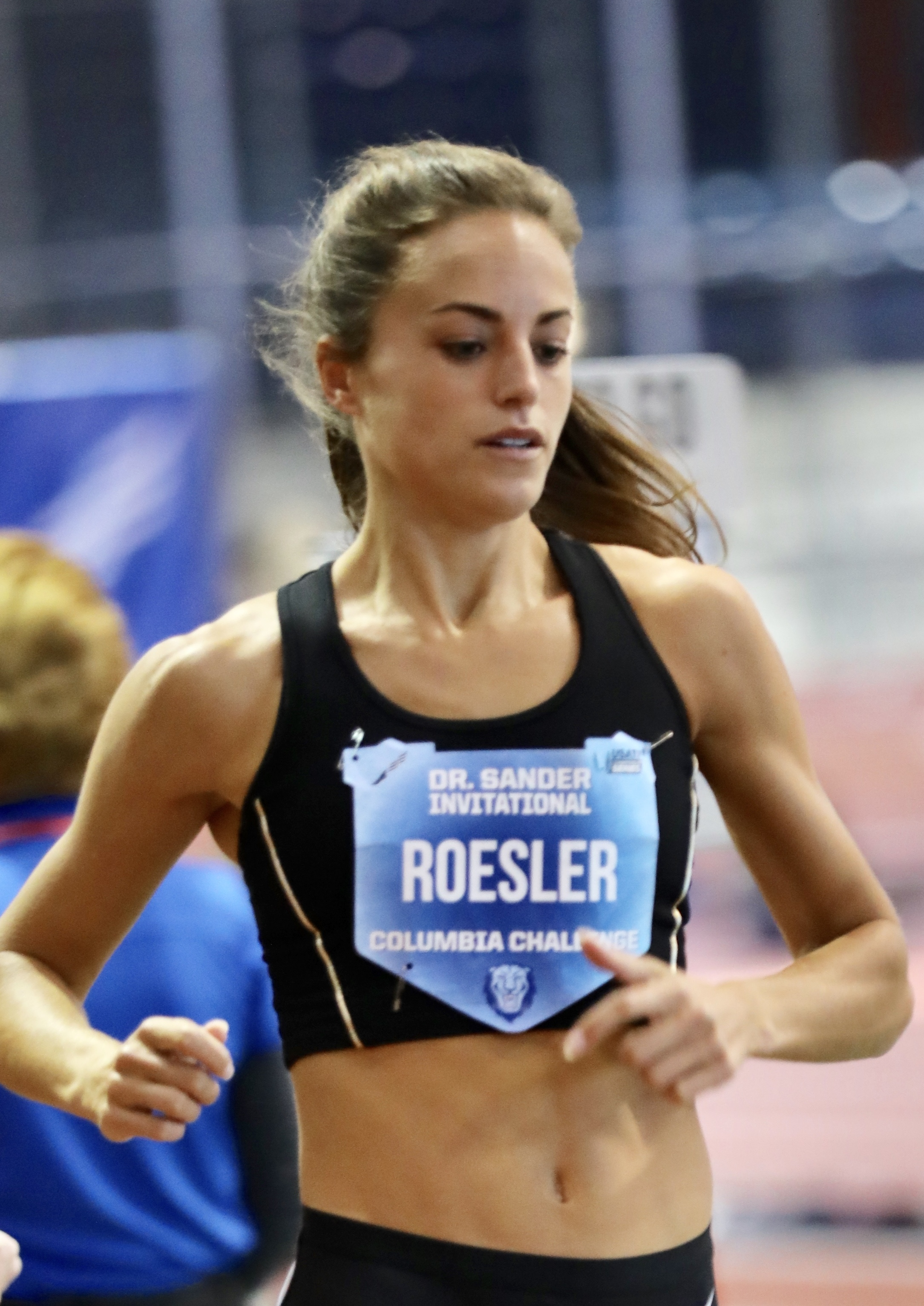
- Roesler in 2019

Personal information
- Born: December 19, 1991 (age 34) Fargo, North Dakota, U.S.
- Height: 5 ft 6 in (1.68 m)

Sport
- Sport: Track
- Event: 800 meters
- College team: Oregon

Achievements and titles
- Personal best(s): 400 meters: 53.25; 800 meters: 1:59.04; 1500 meters: 4:12.93; Mile: 4:40.70
Medal record
Women's athletics
Representing the United States
World Athletics Indoor Championships
	2016 Portland	800m
IAAF World Relays
Gold medal – first place	2017 Bahamas	4 × 800 m
World Junior Championships
Gold medal – first place	2010 Moncton	4 × 400 m
	2010 Moncton	800m
2009 Pan American Junior
	2009 Port-of-Spain	800m

Laura Roesler (born December 19, 1991) is an American middle distance runner who specializes in the 800 metres. She is currently coached by Rose Monday and based in Florida.

== High school career ==
Roesler was a 22-time North Dakota state champion for Fargo South High School. She ran 2:06.82 as a semi-finalist to place 12th in the 800 metres at the 2008 United States Olympic Trials. Roesler placed 2nd in 2:07.41 behind Chanelle Price at the 2009 U20 USA Track and Field Championships. Roesler placed 2nd in 2:05.80 behind Ajeé Wilson at the 2010 U20 USA Track and Field Championships. She earned a 9th-place finish in the semi-finals at the 2010 World Junior Championships in Athletics in 2:04.34.

Event	Personal Best HS
100 m	11.90
200 m	24.01
400 m	53.25
800 m	2:03.08

== College career ==
For college, Roesler chose to compete for the Oregon Ducks where she was a Five-Time NCAA Champion, 17-Time All-American, Three-Time Pac-12 Champion. She ran 2:03.85 to win the 800 meters at the 2014 NCAA Division I Indoor Track and Field Championships. She ran 2:01.22 to win the 800 meters at the 2014 NCAA Division I Outdoor Track and Field Championships. For her accomplishments in 2014, she won The Bowerman award.

School Year	MPSF Indoor track and field Championships	NCAA Division I Women's Indoor Track and Field Championships	Pac-12 Conference Outdoor Track and Field Championships	NCAA Division I Women's Outdoor Track and Field Championships
2014 Senior		800 Meters, 1st, 2:03.85	800 Meters, 1st, 2:05.77	800 Meters, 1st, 2:01.22
2014 Senior		4 x 400 Meters, 1st, 3:27.40		4 x 400 Meters, 3rd, 3:29.03
2013 Junior		800 Meters, 2nd, 2:02.32	800 Meters, 1st, 2:06.51	800 Meters, 2nd, 2:00.98
2013 Junior	4 x 400 Meters, 1st, 3:34.67	4 x 400 Meters, 1st, 3:30.22	4 x 400 Meters, 10th, 3:42.59	4 x 400 Meters, 4th, 3:28.24
2013 Junior	DMR, 3rd, 11:30.54			
2012 Sophomore	800 Meters, 3rd, 2:05.13	800 Meters, 16th, 2:10.62	800 Meters, 1st, 2:05.13	800 Meters, 4th, 2:02.96
2012 Sophomore	4 x 400 Meters, 1st, 3:33.70	4 x 400 Meters, 10th, 3:36.52	4 x 400 Meters, 2nd, 3:32.59	4 x 400 Meters, 1st, 3:24.54
2012 Sophomore		DMR, 3rd, 11:05.85		
2011 Freshman	800 Meters, 3rd, 2:04.93	800 Meters, 11th, 2:07.16	800 Meters, 3rd, 2:04.24	800 Meters, 10th, 2:05.29
2011 Freshman	4 x 400 Meters, 1st, 3:35.44	4 x 400 Meters, 8th, 3:34.98		4 x 400 Meters, 3rd, 3:28.18
2011 Freshman		DMR, 3rd, 10:52.90		

== International career ==
Roesler ran 1:59.04 and was runner up in the 800 metres at the 2014 USA Outdoor Track and Field Championships. She was again runner up in the 800 metres at the 2016 USA Indoor Track and Field Championships and ran 2:00.80 to place 4th in the 2016 IAAF World Indoor Championships. Roesler ran 2:03.55 and was 21st place in the 800 metres at the 2016 United States Olympic Trials. Roesler ran 2:01.10 to place 7th at 2017 USA Outdoor Track and Field Championships. Roesler ran 2:00.84 to place 9th at 2018 USA Outdoor Track and Field Championships.

Team USA Meets	Event	Venue	Place	Time
Representing United States
2017 IAAF World Relays	4 × 800 m	Nassau, Bahamas	1st	8:16.36
2016 IAAF World Indoor Championships	800m	Portland, Oregon	4th	2:00.80
2010 World Junior Championships	4 × 400 m	Moncton, Canada	1st	3:31.20
2010 World Junior Championships	800 m	Moncton, Canada	9th	2:04.34
2009 Pan American Junior Athletics Championships	800 m	Port-of-Spain, Trinidad and Tobago	6th	2:07.50

US National Championship	Event	Venue	Place	Time
2019 USA Indoor Track and Field Championships	1000 m	Staten Island, New York	4th	2:36.60
Representing Nike, Inc.
2018 USA Outdoor Track and Field Championships	800 m	Des Moines, Iowa	9th	2:00.84
2017 USA Outdoor Track and Field Championships	800 m	Sacramento, California	7th	2:01.10
2016 United States Olympic Trials (track and field)	800 m	Eugene, Oregon	21st	2:03.55
2016 USA Indoor Track and Field Championships	800 m	Portland, Oregon	4th	2:00.80
Representing University of Oregon
2014 USA Outdoor Track and Field Championships	800 m	Sacramento, California	2nd	1:59.04
2013 USA Outdoor Track and Field Championships	800 m	Des Moines, Iowa	5th	2:00.23
2012 United States Olympic Trials (track and field)	800 m	Eugene, Oregon	10th	2:03.35
2011 USA Outdoor Track and Field Championships	800 m	Des Moines, Iowa	15th	2:05.56
Representing Fargo South High School
2010 USA Junior Outdoor Track and Field Championships	800 m	Des Moines, Iowa	2nd	2:05.80
2009 USA Junior Outdoor Track and Field Championships	800 m	Eugene, Oregon	2nd	2:07.41
2008 United States Olympic Trials (track and field)	800 m	Eugene, Oregon	12th	2:06.82
2007 USA Junior Outdoor Track and Field Championships	800 m	Indianapolis, Indiana	10th	2:09.76

Awards
Preceded by Brianna Rollins	The Bowerman (women's winner); 2014	Succeeded by Jenna Prandini
