= 4 × 800 metres relay =

Track and field relay event

Athletics 4 × 800 metres relay

World records
- Men: Kenya (Joseph Mutua, William Yiampoy, Ismael Kombich, Wilfred Bungei) 7:02.43 (2006)
- Women: Soviet Union (Nadezhda Olizarenko, Lyubov Gurina, Lyudmila Borisova, Irina Podyalovskaya) 7:50.17 (1984)

The 4 × 800 metres relay is an athletics track event in which teams consist of four runners who each complete 800 metres or 2 laps on a standard 400 metre track.

The IAAF ratifies world records in the event and it became a world championship event in 2014 as part of the IAAF World Relays.

The men's world record is 7:02.43 by a Kenyan team of Joseph Mutua, William Yiampoy, Ismael Kombich and Wilfred Bungei, set August 25, 2006, at the Memorial Van Damme meet in Brussels, Belgium. The women's world record is 7:50.17, set by a team representing the Soviet Union, Nadiya Olizarenko, Lyubov Gurina, Lyudmila Borisova and Irina Podyalovskaya on August 15, 1984, in Moscow.

The imperial distance analogue to the event is the 4 × 880 yards relay, also known as the two-mile relay, contested at a total of 3,520 yards (3,218.688 m) which is slightly longer than the 3200 m metric distance. It was contested at the AIAW Indoor Track and Field Championships and other American and British meets until the switch to metric in the 1980s.

== All-time top 15 ==
=== Men ===
- Updated September 2021.

| Rank | Time | Team | Nation | Date | Place | Ref. |
|---|---|---|---|---|---|---|
| 1 | 7:02.43 | Joseph Mutua, William Yiampoy, Ismael Kombich, Wilfred Bungei | Kenya | 25 August 2006 | Brussels | |
| 2 | 7:02.82 | Santa Monica Track Club; Jebreh Harris, Khadevis Robinson, Sam Burley, David Krummenacker | United States | 25 August 2006 | Brussels | |
| 3 | 7:03.89 | Peter Elliott, Garry Cook, Steve Cram, Sebastian Coe | Great Britain | 30 August 1982 | London | |
| 4 | 7:04.70 | Gideon van Oudtshoorn, Hezekiél Sepeng, Jurgens Kotzé, Johan Botha | South Africa | 6 June 1999 | Stuttgart | |
| 5 | 7:04.84 | Duane Solomon, Eric Sowinski, Casimir Loxsom, Robby Andrews | United States | 2 May 2015 | Nassau | |
| 6 | 7:04.89 | St. Patrick's School; David Kiptoo Singoei, Joseph Tengelei, William Chirchir, Japheth Kimutai | Kenya | 6 June 1999 | Stuttgart | |
| 7 | 7:06:12 | Benelux; Bram Som; David Fiegen; Arnoud Okken; Thomas Matthys | Netherlands; Luxembourg; Netherlands; Belgium | 25 August 2006 | Brussels | |
| 8 | 7:06.5 | Santa Monica Track Club; James Robinson, David Mack, Earl Jones, Johnny Gray | United States | 26 April 1986 | Walnut | |
| 9 | 7:06.66 | Majid Saeed Sultan, Salem Amer Al-Badri, Abdulrahman Suleiman, Ali Abubaker Kamal | Qatar | 25 August 2006 | Brussels | |
| 10 | 7:07.1 | Kericho ?, ?, ?, Abraham Kiplagat | Kenya | 7 March 2014 | Nairobi | |
| 11 | 7:07.40 | Leonid Masunov, Aleksandr Kostyetskiy, Vasiliy Matveyev, Viktor Kalinkin | Soviet Union | 5 August 1984 | Moscow | |
| 12 | 7:08.0 | Chicago Track Club; Tom Bach, Ken Sparks, Lowell Paul, Rick Wohlhuter | United States | 12 May 1973 | Durham | |
| 13 | 7:08.1 | Vladimir Podolyako, Nikolay Kirov, Vladimir Malozyemlin, Anatoliy Reshetnyak | Soviet Union | 12 August 1978 | Podolsk | |
| 14 | 7:08.3 A | Kenya Defence Forces | Kenya | 7 March 2014 | Nairobi | |
| 15 | 7:08.30 A | Abraham Kiplagat, Robert Biwott, Edward Kemboi, Cornelius Kiplangat | Kenya | 26 April 2014 | Nairobi | |

=== Women ===
- Updated September 2021.

| Rank | Time | Team | Nation | Date | Place | Ref. |
|---|---|---|---|---|---|---|
| 1 | 7:50.17 | Nadezhda Olizarenko, Lyubov Gurina, Lyudmila Borisova, Irina Podyalovskaya | Soviet Union | 5 August 1984 | Moscow | |
| 2 | 7:51.62 | Nina Ruchayeva, Ravilya Agletdinova, Nadezhda Loboyko, Valentina Parkhuta | Soviet Union | 5 August 1984 | Moscow | |
| 3 | 7:52.24 | Yekaterina Podkopayeva, Nadezhda Loboyko, Nadezhda Olizarenko, Ravilya Agletdinova | Soviet Union | 4 August 1985 | Leningrad | |
| 4 | 7:52.3 | Tatyana Providokhina, Valentina Gerasimova, Svetlana Styrkina, Tatyana Kazankina | Soviet Union | 16 August 1976 | Podolsk | |
| 5 | 7:54.10 | Elfi Zinn, Gunhild Hoffmeister, Anita Weiß, Ulrike Bruns | German Democratic Republic | 6 August 1976 | Karl-Marx-Stadt | |
| 6 | 7:56.6 | Russia; Zoya Rigel, Lyubov Gurina, Yekaterina Podkopayeva, Tatyana Mishkel | Soviet Union | 8 September 1980 | Donetsk | |
| 7 | 7:56:6 | Ukraine; Lyubov Smolka, Maryna Sheberova, Svetlana Popova, Tamara Koba | Soviet Union | 8 September 1980 | Donetsk | |
| 8 | 7:56.9 | Leningrad; Zoya Rigel, Lyubov Gurina, Olga Dvirna, Lyudmila Veselkova | Soviet Union | 8 September 1980 | Donetsk | |
| 9 | 7:57.08 | Olga Kuzenkova, Natalya Betekhtina, Olga Burkanova, Svetlana Masterkova | Russia | 5 June 1993 | Portsmouth | |
| 10 | 7:57.21 | Liliana Salageanu, Mitica Constantin, Violeta Szekely, Laura Itcou | Romania | 5 June 1993 | Portsmouth | |
| 11 | 7:58.5 | Lithuania; Ana Ambrazienė, Danguolė Bislytė, Laima Juknavičienė, Laimutė Baikauskaitė | Soviet Union | 8 September 1980 | Donetsk | |
| 12 | 7:59.6 | Russia; Olga Mineyeva, Maria Enkina, Nadezhda Olizarenko, Yekaterina Podkopayeva | Soviet Union | 24 July 1979 | Moscow | |
| 13 | 8:00.62 | Chanelle Price, Maggie Vessey, Molly Beckwith-Ludlow, Alysia Johnson Montaño | United States | 3 May 2015 | Nassau | |
| 14 | 8:00.84 | Russia; Nina Ruchayeva, Nadezhda Loboyko, Olga Nelyubova, Lyubov Gurina | Soviet Union | 19 July 1987 | Bryansk | |
| 15 | 8:01.58 | Chanelle Price, Geena Lara, Ajee' Wilson, Brenda Martinez | United States | 25 May 2014 | Nassau | |
