= 2012 World Junior Championships in Athletics – Women's 800 metres =

The women's 800 metres at the 2012 World Junior Championships in Athletics will be held at the Estadi Olímpic Lluís Companys on 10, 11, and 12 July.

== Medalists ==
Gold	Ajeé Wilson; United States
Silver	Jessica Judd; Great Britain
Bronze	Manal El Bahraoui; Morocco

== Records ==
Prior to the competition, the existing world junior and championship records were as follows.

World Junior Record	Pamela Jelimo (KEN)	1:54.01	Zürich, Switzerland	29 August 2008
Championship Record	Elena Mirela Lavric (ROM)	2:00.06	Bydgoszcz, Poland	11 July 2008
World Junior Leading	Anastasiya Tkachuk (UKR)	2:00.78	Yalta, Ukraine	28 May 2012

== Results ==
=== Heats ===
Qualification: The first 3 of each heat (Q) and the 6 fastest times (q) qualified

Rank	Heat	Lane	Name	Nationality	Time	Note
1	1	4	Jessica Judd	Great Britain	2:02.71	Q
2	1	7	Winnie Nanyondo	Uganda	2:03.00	Q, PB
3	1	5	Agatha Jeruto Kimaswai	Kenya	2:03.22	Q, PB
4	1	9	Sonja Mosler	Germany	2:03.36	q, PB
5	5	5	Anastasiya Tkachuk	Ukraine	2:04.19	Q
6	5	6	Aníta Hinriksdóttir	Iceland	2:04.74	Q, New Jersey
7	1	6	Khadija El Moussaoui	Morocco	2:05.63	q, PB
8	3	4	Emily Dudgeon	Great Britain	2:05.73	Q
9	5	3	Síofra Cléirigh Büttner	Ireland	2:05.87	Q
10	3	3	Dureti Edao	Ethiopia	2:05.91	Q
11	6	5	Manal El Bahraoui	Morocco	2:06.07	Q
12	3	8	Simoya Campbell	Jamaica	2:06.18	Q
13	5	7	Maruša Mišmaš	Slovenia	2:06.25	q
14	2	7	Halimah Nakaayi	Uganda	2:06.38	Q
15	2	4	Julia Zrinyi	Canada	2:06.64	Q
16	3	2	Marta Pen	Portugal	2:06.75	q, PB
17	3	7	Rénelle Lamote	France	2:06.89	q
18	4	5	Ajeé Wilson	United States	2:07.04	Q
18	4	9	Devan Wiebe	Canada	2:07.04	Q
20	1	3	Camille Laplace	France	2:07.07	q
21	2	8	Monique Stander	South Africa	2:07.08	Q
22	4	4	Christine Gees	Germany	2:07.11	Q
23	3	6	Teshon Adderley	Bahamas	2:07.18	
24	4	6	Akiho Fukuzato	Japan	2:07.25	
25	2	9	Syntia Ellward	Poland	2:07.32	
26	4	7	Olena Sidorska	Ukraine	2:07.52	
27	2	6	Mizuki Yamamoto	Japan	2:07.59	
28	6	4	Flávia de Lima	Brazil	2:07.78	Q
29	6	2	Danielle Aragon	United States	2:07.84	Q
30	2	3	Aleksandra Astakhova	Belarus	2:08.03	
31	6	7	Asli Arik	Turkey	2:08.68	
32	1	8	Johanna Matintalo	Finland	2:09.05	
33	4	3	Sanda Kociš	Croatia	2:09.51	
34	5	8	Iuliana Madalina Leonte	Romania	2:09.61	
35	6	3	Desreen Montague	Jamaica	2:10.22	
36	3	5	Marta Frechilla	Spain	2:11.97	
37	5	9	Irene Baldessari	Italy	2:12.15	
38	6	6	Zeyetuna Mohammed	Ethiopia	2:12.47	
39	5	4	Thato Makhafola	South Africa	2:16.82	
40	2	5	Tatyana Yurchenko	Kazakhstan	2:20.02	
41	6	8	Marija Stambolic	Serbia	2:29.85	
42	3	9	Domingas Tchiaca	Angola	2:35.97	
	4	8	Shimenege Agber	Nigeria	DNS	
	6	9	Aicha Bilal Fall	Mauritania	DNS	

=== Semi-final ===
Qualification: The first 2 of each heat (Q) and the 2 fastest times (q) qualified

Rank	Heat	Lane	Name	Nationality	Time	Note
1	3	4	Jessica Judd	Great Britain	2:02.30	Q
2	2	5	Emily Dudgeon	Great Britain	2:02.32	Q, PB
3	3	7	Winnie Nanyondo	Uganda	2:02.38	Q, PB
4	2	7	Ajeé Wilson	United States	2:02.43	Q, PB
5	1	5	Anastasiya Tkachuk	Ukraine	2:02.50	Q
6	2	6	Sonja Mosler	Germany	2:02.82	q, PB
7	1	6	Aníta Hinriksdóttir	Iceland	2:03.15	Q, NR
8	1	7	Manal El Bahraoui	Morocco	2:03.18	q
9	3	5	Agatha Jeruto Kimaswai	Kenya	2:03.98	
10	3	6	Khadija El Moussaoui	Morocco	2:04.17	PB
11	3	2	Danielle Aragon	United States	2:04.19	PB
12	3	4	Christine Gees	Germany	2:04.58	PB
13	2	4	Monique Stander	South Africa	2:05.29	
14	2	3	Devan Wiebe	Canada	2:05.40	PB
15	1	2	Marta Pen	Portugal	2:05.45	PB
16	2	8	Rénelle Lamote	France	2:05.83	
17	1	9	Síofra Cléirigh Büttner	Ireland	2:06.70	
18	2	2	Flávia de Lima	Brazil	2:07.03	
19	1	3	Maruša Mišmaš	Slovenia	2:07.23	
20	1	8	Dureti Edao	Ethiopia	2:07.91	
21	3	3	Camille Laplace	France	2:08.04	
22	3	4	Julia Zrinyi	Canada	2:09.63	
-	2	9	Halimah Nakaayi	Uganda	DQ	
-	1	4	Simoya Campbell	Jamaica	DNS	

=== Final ===
Rank	Lane	Name	Nationality	Time	Note
1st place, gold medalist(s)	9	Ajeé Wilson	United States	2:00.91	PB
2nd place, silver medalist(s)	6	Jessica Judd	Great Britain	2:00.96	PB
3rd place, bronze medalist(s)	3	Manal El Bahraoui	Morocco	2:03.09	
4	2	Aníta Hinriksdóttir	Iceland	2:03.23	
5	8	Sonja Mosler	Germany	2:04.07	
6	7	Emily Dudgeon	Great Britain	2:04.68	
7	4	Anastasiia Tkachuk	Ukraine	2:04.92	
8	5	Winnie Nanyondo	Uganda	2:07.23	

== Participation ==
According to an unofficial count, 42 athletes from 30 countries participated in the event.

- Angola (1)
- Bahamas (1)
- Belarus (1)
- Brazil (1)
- Canada (2)
- Croatia (1)
- Ethiopia (2)
- Finland (1)
- France (2)
- Germany (2)
- Iceland (1)
- Ireland (1)
- Italy (1)
- Jamaica (2)
- Japan (2)
- Kazakhstan (1)
- Kenya (1)
- Morocco (2)
- Poland (1)
- Portugal (1)
- Romania (1)
- Serbia (1)
- Slovenia (1)
- South Africa (2)
- Spain (1)
- Turkey (1)
- Uganda (2)
- Ukraine (2)
- United Kingdom (2)
- United States (2)
