= Flávia de Lima =

Brazilian middle-distance runner

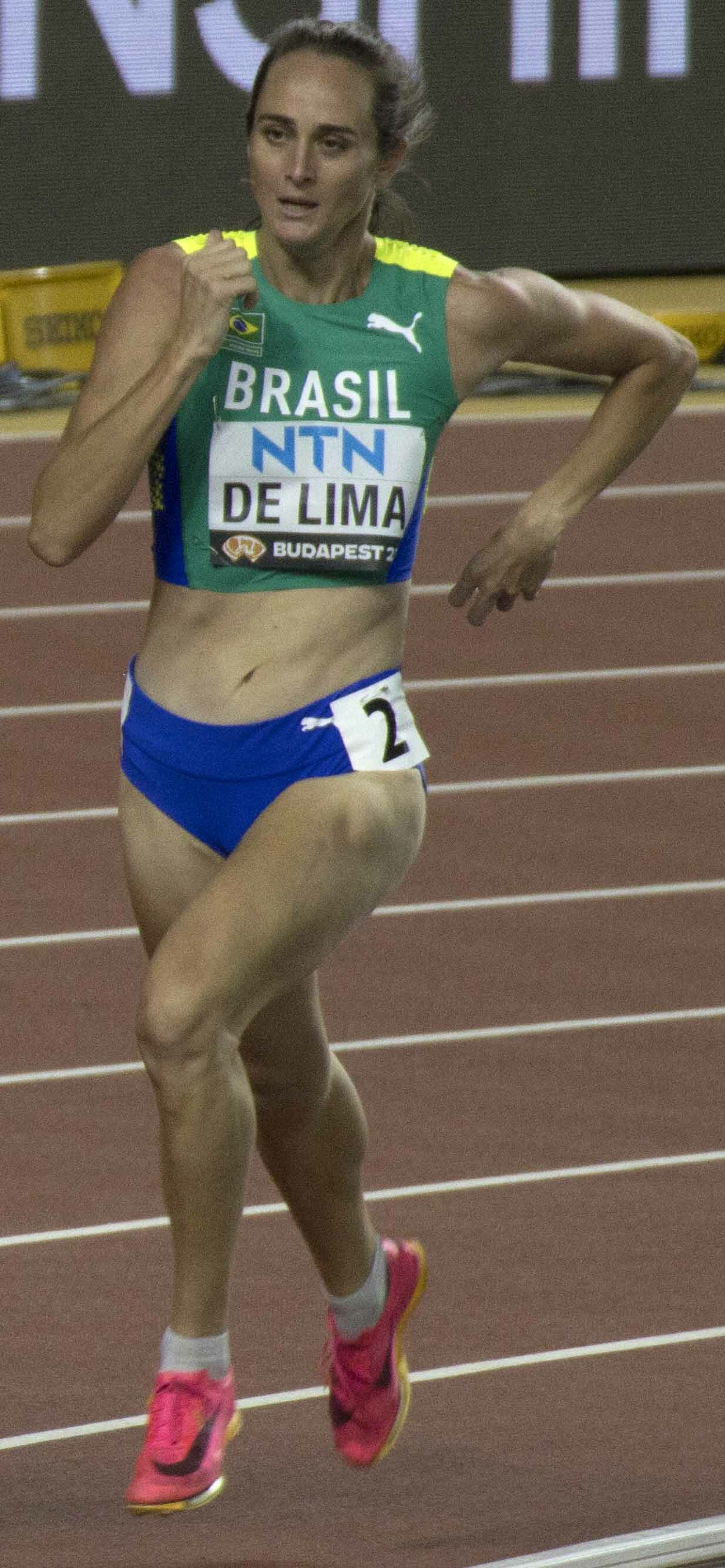
- Flávia de Lima at the 2023 World Athletics Championships

Personal information
- Born: 1 July 1993 (age 33) Campo do Tenente, Brazil
- Height: 1.76 m (5 ft 9 in)
- Weight: 65 kg (143 lb)

Sport
- Sport: Track and field
- Event: 800 metres
Medal record
Representing Brazil
Pan American Games
Bronze medal – third place	2015 Toronto	800m

Flávia Maria de Lima (born 1 July 1993) is a Brazilian middle-distance runner competing primarily in the 800 metres. She represented her country at the 2015 World Championships in Beijing without advancing from the first round. In addition, she won a bronze medal at the 2015 Pan American Games.

== Competition record ==
Year	Competition	Venue	Position	Event	Notes
Representing Brazil
2012	World Junior Championships	Barcelona, Spain	18th (sf)	800 m	2:07.03
2013	South American Championships	Cartagena, Colombia	2nd	800 m	2:02.94
2014	South American U23 Championships	Montevideo, Uruguay	1st	1500 m	4:21.05
2014	South American U23 Championships	Montevideo, Uruguay	1st	4 × 400 m relay	3:42.07
2015	South American Championships	Lima, Peru	2nd	800 m	2:02.05
2015	South American Championships	Lima, Peru	2nd	1500 m	4:13.58
2015	Pan American Games	Toronto, Canada	3rd	800 m	2:00.40
2015	Pan American Games	Toronto, Canada	5th	1500 m	4:16.53
2015	Pan American Games	Toronto, Canada	10th (h)	4 × 400 m relay	3:34.97
2015	World Championships	Beijing, China	32nd (h)	800 m	2:01.76
2016	Olympic Games	Rio de Janeiro, Brazil	53rd (h)	800 m	2:03.78
2021	South American Championships	Guayaquil, Ecuador	2nd	800 m	2:05.00
2021	South American Championships	Guayaquil, Ecuador	3rd	4 × 400 m relay	3:36.40
2022	Ibero-American Championships	La Nucia, Spain	9th (h)	800 m	2:07.11
2023	South American Championships	São Paulo, Brazil	1st	800 m	2:01.82
2023	World Championships	Budapest, Hungary	17th (sf)	800 m	2:00.77
2024	South American Indoor Championships	Cochabamba, Bolivia	3rd	800 m	2:11.34
2024	South American Indoor Championships	Cochabamba, Bolivia	4th	1500 m	5:07.57
2024	World Indoor Championships	Glasgow, United Kingdom	25th (h)	800 m	2:05.71
2024	Olympic Games	Paris, France	15th (rep)	800 m	2:01.64
2025	South American Championships	Mar del Plata, Argentina	9th	800 m	2:13.81

== Personal bests ==
Outdoor

- 800 metres – 2:00.40 (Toronto 2015)
- 1500 metres – 4:13.29 (São Bernardo do Campo 2015)

Indoor

- 800 metres – 2:05.71 (Glasgow 2024)
- 1500 metres – 5:07.57 (Cochabamba 2024)
