= Molly Ludlow =

American middle-distance runner (born 1987)

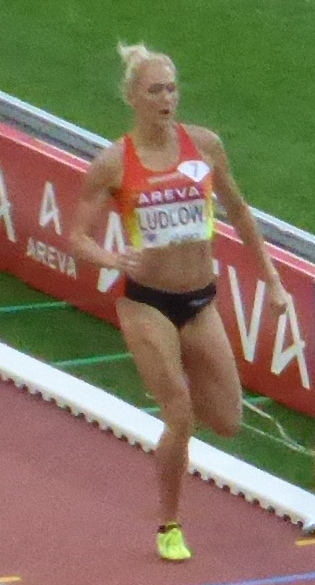
- Molly Ludlow in 2015

Personal information
- Born: August 4, 1987 (age 38) Worthington, Ohio

Sport
- Country: United States
- Event: 800 meters
- College team: Indiana Hoosiers
- Coached by: Ron Helmer

Achievements and titles
- Personal best: 800 m: 1:57.68 (2016)
Medal record
IAAF World Relays
Gold medal – first place	2015 Nassau	4 × 800 m relay
- Updated on August 14, 2015

Molly Beckwith-Ludlow (born Molly Elizabeth Beckwith on August 4, 1987) is a retired American middle-distance runner. She finished third at the 2014 USA Outdoor Track and Field Championships and is a two-time Olympic alternate in the 800 m. She also holds the American record in the 4 × 800 metres relay.

== Biography ==
Molly Beckwith was born on August 4, 1987, in Worthington, Ohio. She attended Thomas Worthington High School, setting school records in the 200 meters and 400 meters as a freshman; in her sophomore and junior years she concentrated on soccer, dropping track and field. She returned to the track in her senior year, but soccer remained her main sport, and after graduating from high school she went to Indiana University on a soccer scholarship.

She played soccer through her freshman year at Indiana, but knee problems, which she had already suffered from in high school, forced her to drop soccer and give up her scholarship; track was not a problem for her knees, so she joined the Indiana Hoosiers' track and field team in her sophomore year, now running the 400 meters and 800 meters, and earned a new scholarship through that sport. The 800 meters soon became her main event, and she developed steadily. At the 2010 NCAA championships she placed second to Phoebe Wright in a personal best 2:02.14.

Later that summer, she broke two minutes for the first time, running 1:59.83 in Lignano; sponsored by the shoe company Saucony, she turned professional. She continued to train under her coach at Indiana, Ron Helmer.

In 2011, her first full year as a professional, she improved her personal best to 1:59.12 (again in Lignano) and placed seventh at the United States championships. In 2012, she placed second behind Fantu Magiso at the Adidas Grand Prix, running 1:59.18. The same year, she won the Diamond League London Grand Prix. She narrowly missed qualifying for the 2012 Summer Olympics; at the Olympic Trials she was in the top three until the end, but tied up and fell to fourth place with meters to go. She skipped the 2013 season to recover from her knee problems; she married Reed Ludlow, a former Division II collegiate basketball player, that fall. She returned to the track in 2014, placing third at the 2014 USA Outdoor Track and Field Championships. She finished in the top six in four Diamond League meetings, breaking two minutes in both Lausanne and Monaco. Track & Field News ranked her #10 in the world that year, her first top 10 world ranking.

In 2015 Ludlow won gold with the American team in the 4 × 800 m relay at the World Relays; the team's winning time, 8:00.62, was a new American record. She placed fourth at the United States championships in 2:00.09, missing qualifying for the World Championships in Beijing by 0.04 seconds. The following week she improved her personal best to 1:58.68 at the Paris Diamond League meeting, where she also placed fourth. After Ajee' Wilson withdrew from the World Championships due to an injury, Ludlow was named as her replacement. She finished in the semifinals of the 800 m at the 2015 World Championships in Athletics.

In July 2016, Ludlow competed in the Olympic trials, running 1:59.59 and again placing 4th by 0.04 seconds. One week later, she set a personal best of 1:57.68 in Monaco, becoming the seventh fastest US woman at that distance.

In April 2017, Ludlow retired due to pregnancy. In May, she accepted a warning from USADA for a December 2016 positive test for her prescribed hydroxyclomiphene, a fertility treatment and banned performance enhancing drug.
