= Castle View School =

Location
- Foksville Road; Canvey Island, Essex, SS8 7FH; England; 51°31′53″N 0°35′13″E

Information
- Type: Academy
- Motto: Pursue Excellence And Be The Best.
- Local authority: Essex
- Department for Education URN: 141498 Tables
- Ofsted: Reports
- Headteacher: Steve Durkin
- Gender: Coeducational
- Age: 11 to 16
- Enrolment: 904 pupils
- Houses: Green, Blue, Red, Yellow
- Website: castleview.essex.sch.uk

Castle View School is a comprehensive school for ages 11–16, on Canvey Island in Essex, England, on the old Furtherwick School site in the Canvey town centre. As of 2006, it has some 900 pupils and 200 staff.

Castle View is named after the original site, in Meppel Avenue, Canvey Island, where there was a clear view of the remains of Hadleigh Castle.

Castle View School's headteacher is Steve Durkin (appointed in 2016).

Castle View School was moved to a new building located at Foksville Road in the centre of Canvey town in January 2012. A small portion of the old Castle View School site, part of the Sheridan pitch, the playground and the "chestnut green" has been used to build a new vocational education centre. The entirety of the old building still stands, and has been used for police training.

The school was reported in 2013 to have banned triangular shaped flapjacks for health and safety reasons. In a response to requests for comments on the reports, the Health and Safety Executive said of the decision "We often come across half-baked decisions taken in the name of health and safety, but this one takes the biscuit."

The school converted to academy status on 1 October 2014.

== Notable former pupils ==
- Jessica Warner-Judd, runner
