= Chanelle Price =

American middle-distance runner

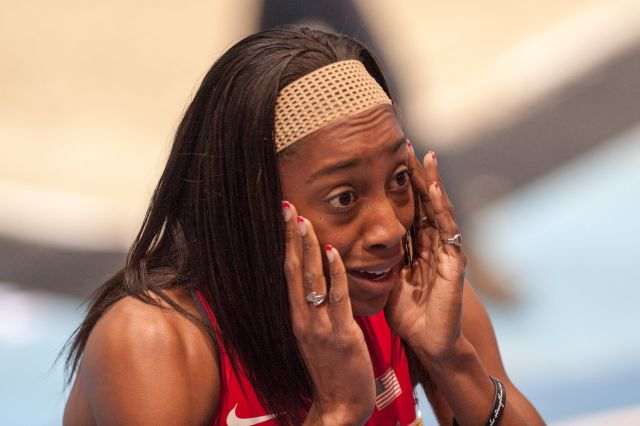
- Price at the 2014 IAAF World Indoor Championships

Personal information
- Nationality: American
- Born: August 22, 1990 (age 35) Livingston, New Jersey, U.S.

Sport
- Sport: Track
- Event(s): 800 meters, 1500 meters
- College team: Tennessee

Achievements and titles
- Personal best(s): 800 meters: 1:59.10; 1500 meters: 4:16.52; Mile: 4:31.68
Medal record
Women's athletics
Representing United States
World Indoor Championships
Gold medal – first place	2014 Sopot	800 m
NACAC Championships
Gold medal – first place	2015 San Jose	800 m
World Relay Championships
Gold medal – first place	2014 Nassau	4 × 800 m relay
Gold medal – first place	2015 Nassau	4 × 800 m relay
Gold medal – first place	2017 Nassau	4 × 800 m relay

Chanelle Price (born August 22, 1990) is an American middle-distance runner who specializes in the 800-meter run. She has a personal record of 1:58.73 for the distance. She was the gold medalist at the IAAF World Indoor Championships in 2014.

Price represented the United States at the 2007 World Youth Championships in Athletics and was a medalist at the 2009 Pan American Junior Athletics Championships and the 2012 NACAC Under-23 Championships in Athletics.

In 2008, she ran the second fastest 800 m time ever for an American high school girl and was chosen as the High School Athlete of the Year. She attended the University of Tennessee and broke the world records for the distance medley relay and the 4 × 800 metres relay with the college team. She also set an American record for the 4 × 1500 metres relay. She won two NCAA titles in the distance medley relay and placed in the top three of the 800 m at the NCAA Outdoor Championships.

== Running career ==
=== High school ===
Born in Livingston, New Jersey to Harry and Yolanda Price, she grew up in Easton, Pennsylvania and attended Easton Area High School there. In 2007, she won the Nike High School Nationals title in the 800 m and then, age sixteen, she ran at the USA Outdoor Track and Field Championships and placed seventh. At the 2007 World Youth Championships in Athletics she was the early leader, but was illegally blocked by Winny Chebet in the final lap and finished sixth. A significant personal best of 2:01.61 minutes at the Prefontaine Classic, which was the second fastest ever by an American high school athlete, led to her inclusion at the 2008 United States Olympic Trials, where she ran in qualifying. As a result of these performances, she was chosen as the female High School Athlete of the Year.

=== Collegiate ===
Price was given the Wayne Basler women's athletic scholarship award to attend the University of Tennessee and study journalism and electronic media. She began competing for the Tennessee Lady Volunteers cross country running and track and field teams. She came sixth in the Southeastern Conference (SEC) indoor championship in the 800 m, then managed third place in the event at the SEC Outdoor championship, running a season's best of 2:03.30 minutes. She achieved a world indoor record for the distance medley relay at the 2009 NCAA Women's Indoor Track and Field Championship, winning the title with a time of 10:50.98 minutes with Phoebe Wright, Brittany Jones and Sarah Bowman. More relay world records came at the Penn Relays in April. Price, Wright and Bowman again teamed up to set an American record of 8:17.91 minutes in the 4 × 800 metres relay with Kimarra McDonald and ran with Rolanda Bell to claim the 4 × 1500 metres relay world best with 17:08.34 minutes. The former team also won the distance medley relay title at the meet. At the NCAA Women's Outdoor Track and Field Championship she came eleventh in the 800 m. She claimed the American junior (under-20) title and went on to win a silver medal behind Cuba's Rose Mary Almanza at the 2009 Pan American Junior Athletics Championships.

At the start of her sophomore year, she ran in a few cross country races, including 18th place at the SEC Championships. On the track, she was runner-up in the 800 m at the SEC Indoor Championships, setting a best of 2:03.12 minutes, then went on to take fourth place and another distance medley relay win at the NCAA Indoor Championships. She picked up a leg injury in the outdoor season and made only limited appearances, although these include relay legs at the Penn Relays where Tennessee defended all three of their relay titles. In the 2011 indoor season, she won the SEC 800 m title and also the distance medley relay, then placed sixth the NCAA indoors. She won the SEC outdoor title that year and managed third at the NCAA outdoors – her first individual podium finish at the meet. Price entered the 800 m at the 2011 USA Outdoor Track and Field Championships, but fell in the first round.

In her final year at University of Tennessee, she failed to defend her SEC 800 m titles, ending up second both indoors and out. She placed ninth individually at the NCAA indoor meet, where she again won the distance medley relay with her school. A run of 2:01.49 minutes brought her third place for a consecutive time at the NCAA Outdoor Championships. After the end of the collegiate season she ran (unsuccessfully) at the 2012 United States Olympic Trials and won the gold medal at the 2012 NACAC Under-23 Championships in Athletics. She ended the season with a personal record of 2:00.15 minutes in Belgium. While at university, Price managed two titles and two individual podium finishes in NCAA competition. She also performed well academically: she was awarded the NCAA Postgraduate Scholarship in 2012 and appeared four times on the Southeastern Conference Academic Honor Roll.

=== Professional ===
In her first professional year she ran mostly in the United States. An indoor best of 2:02.93 minutes saw her finish in second place to Ajeé Wilson at the 2013 USA Indoor Track and Field Championships. Outdoors, she won at the Florida Relays, was runner-up at the Ponce Grand Prix and was ninth at the Prefontaine Classic. A season's best of 2:00.88 minutes came at the 2013 USA Outdoor Track and Field Championships, but this left her eliminated in the semi-final stages. She ran in Europe in July 2013, but did not improve her best. After 2013, Price started a contract with Nike.

The following year, she was again second to Ajeé Wilson at the 2014 USA Indoor Track and Field Championships, this time running a personal record of 2:00.48 minutes to place just five hundredths of a second behind her younger rival. Their times ranked them first and second in the world that year and gained both a place on the team for the 2014 IAAF World Indoor Championships. In her heat, Price was beaten by Selina Büchel (who ran a lifetime best), but qualified for the final as the fastest loser. She led out from the start of the final and was never overhauled, holding back Maryna Arzamasava to win the world indoor title in the 800 m in a personal best time of 2:00.09 minutes.

In semi-final 800 m, Price did not start due to a foot injury at 2014 USA Outdoor Track and Field Championships. In Fall 2014, she reconnected with her coach from University of Tennessee JJ Clark.

In the final 800 m, Price finished 5th in 2:00.16 at 2015 USA Outdoor Track and Field Championships. A few weeks later, at the Herculis in Monaco, Price paced Genzebe Dibaba to her 1500 metres world record of 3:50.07.

Chanelle Price earned a graduate certificate with non-profit management from University of Connecticut Department of Public Policy in 2015–2016. In semi-final 800 m, Price finished 11th at 2:01.94 at 2016 United States Olympic Trials (track and field). In Fall 2016, she moved to Phoenix, Arizona to train at ALTIS and is now coached by Ricky Soos.

In November 2019, she moved to Eugene, Oregon to train with Oregon Track Club and is now coached by Mark Rowland.

== Personal records ==
Outdoor

- 400-meter dash – 54.26 (2013)
- 800-meter run – 1:59.10 (2015)
- 1500-meter run – 4:20.29 (2013)

Indoor

- 400-meter dash – 54.64 (2014)
- 800-meter run – 2:00.09 (2014)
- Mile run – 4:43.64 (2014)

== Competition record ==
Year	Competition	Venue	Position	Event	Notes
2007	World Youth Championships	Ostrava, Czech Republic	6th	800 m	2:06.55
2009	Pan American Junior Championships	Port of Spain, Trinidad and Tobago	2nd	800 m	2:05.13
2012	NACAC U23 Championships	Irapuato, Mexico	1st	800 m	2:04.48
2014	World Indoor Championships	Sopot, Poland	1st	800 m	2:00.09
2014	IAAF World Relays	Nassau, Bahamas	1st	4 × 800 m relay	8:01.58
2015	IAAF World Relays	Nassau, Bahamas	1st	4 × 800 m relay	8:00.62 (AR)
2015	NACAC Championships	San José, Costa Rica	1st	800 m	2:00.48
2017	IAAF World Relays	Nassau, Bahamas	1st	4 × 800 m relay	8:16.36
