= Athletics at the 1991 Summer Universiade – Women's 3000 metres =

Women's 3000 meter event held at the 1991 Summer Universiade in Sheffield, England

The women's 3000 metres event at the 1991 Summer Universiade was held at the Don Valley Stadium in Sheffield on 20 July 1991.

== Results ==
Rank	Athlete	Nationality	Time	Notes
1st place, gold medalist(s)	Iulia Besliu	Romania	8:55.42	
2nd place, silver medalist(s)	Sonia O'Sullivan	Ireland	8:56.35	
3rd place, bronze medalist(s)	Zita Ágoston	Hungary	9:01.09	
4	Lyudmila Borisova	Soviet Union	9:02.05	
5	Roberta Brunet	Italy	9:02.34	
6	Alison Wiley	Canada	9:06.34	
7	Julia Vaquero	Spain	9:08.45	
8	Suzana Ćirić	FR Yugoslavia	9:09.40	
9	Andrea Sollárová	Czechoslovakia	9:10.79	
10	Krishna Stanton	Australia	9:11.92	
11	Hayley Haining	Great Britain	9:12.28	
12	Begoña Herráez	Spain	9:13.84	
13	Nicole Birk	United States	9:14.03	
14	Buffy Rabbitt	United States	9:14.40	
15	Bridget Smyth	Great Britain	9:17.86	
16	Mónica Gama	Portugal	9:19.32	
17	Beatrice Ayikoro	Uganda	9:24.49	
18	Christien Toonstra	Netherlands	9:28.97	
19	Carmen de Oliveira	Brazil	9:34.44	
20	Róisín Smyth	Ireland	9:48.75	
21	Amina Amaddah	Morocco	10:07.38	
22	Mirna El-Hajj	Lebanon	11:30.66	
	Simona Staicu	Romania	DNF	
