= Maggie Vessey =

American middle-distance runner

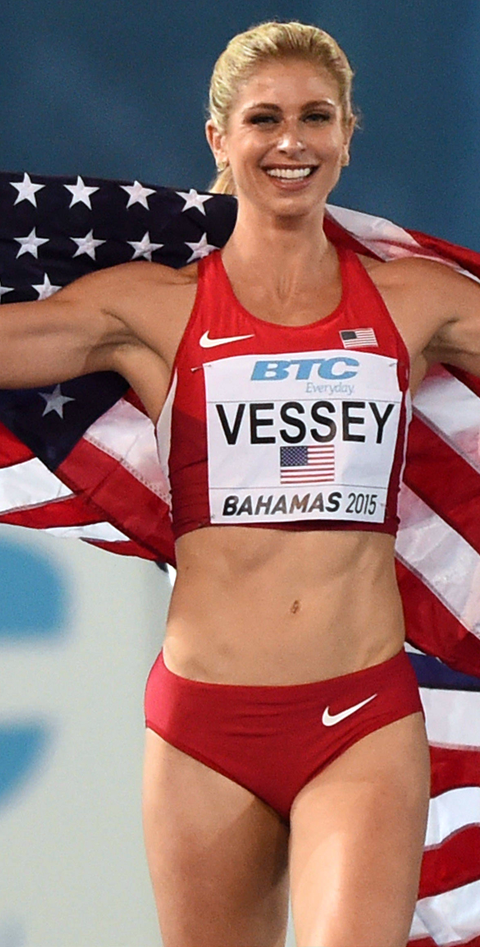

Personal information
- Born: 23 December 1981 (age 44)
- Height: 5 ft 7 in (1.70 m)
- Weight: 127 lb (58 kg)

Sport
- Country: United States
- Event: 800 m
- College team: Cal Poly-San Luis Obispo Mustangs
- Coached by: Greg Brock, Rose Monday

Achievements and titles
- World finals: 2009, 800 m, 7th in Semi-finals 2011, 800 m, 4th in finals
- Personal best: 800 m: 1:57.84
Medal record
Women's athletics
Representing the United States
World Relay Championships
Gold medal – first place	2015 Nassau	4×800 m relay
World Athletics Final
Silver medal – second place	2009 Thessaloniki	800 m

Maggie Vessey (born December 23, 1981) is an American athlete who competes in middle distance track events. Vessey represented the United States at the 2009 World Championships in Athletics and 2011 World Championships in Athletics in the 800 m.

== Early life and education ==
Vessey grew up in Soquel, California and attended Monte Vista High School and Soquel High School. Later, she attended California Polytechnic State University.

== Professional athletics career ==
While competing for Cal Poly-San Luis Obispo, Vessey was the Big West Conference 800 m champion twice. She finished second in the 800 m at the 2005 NCAA championships.

At the 2008 U.S. Olympic Trials, Vessey finished 5th in the 800 m, with a time of 2:02.01. In June 2009, Vessey was a surprise winner at the Prefontaine Classic, in 2:00.18. The race director said Vessey "was a last-minute, last-minute add. One step above a field-filler". The competition included Olympic gold medalist Pamela Jelimo.

Vessey continued her impressive results in 2009. At the Herculis meet in Monaco, she won the race with a time of 1:57.84. At the time, this was the fastest 800 m performance for the year, and tied for the seventh fastest by an American runner. This result earned Vessey a place on the US 2009 World Championship team—she finished 4th at the 2009 U.S. Championships, and needed to break 2:00 to earn an "A" standard.

At the 2009 World Championships, Vessey finished seventh in the 800 m semifinal with a time of 2:03.55. At the 2009 IAAF World Athletics Final in Greece, Vessey took 2nd and the Silver in a time of 2:00.31.

In 2011, masters runner Rose Monday became Vessey's coach. She qualified for the finals of the 800 m at the 2011 World Championships in Athletics, where she finished fourth, moving up from sixth place later because of the disqualification of Russian Mariya Savinova and Yekaterina Kostetskaya. A week later, Vessey won the 800 m in 1:58.64 at the Hanžeković Memorial as part of the IAAF World Challenge Meetings.

At the 2012 US Olympic trials, Vessey finished eighth in 2:03.44.

On December 21, 2012 Vessey accepted a public warning and loss of results for testing positive for canrenone. She admitted to taking a prescribed skincare product, but was not aware that it contained a diuretic.

Maggie rejoined Coach Greg Brock in 2014 and subsequently ran the three fastest 400m times of her career including a 52.82 clocking at the 2014 Occidental Invite. Benoit Duboscq serves as her strength coach. In May 2015 Vessey ran the second leg of the 4x800m US National Team which won the gold medal at the IAAF World Championships in the Bahamas and set a pending USA national record. It was the world's fastest time in this event for more than 20 years. Her split was 2:00.92. She also has individual 800m victories in 2015 at the Palo Alto Stanford Invitational, the Hoka One One Occidental Invite, and the Prefontaine Classic National 800m. Maggie tripped on someone's leg in the 800 meters final with 250 meters to go and finished 8th at 2015 USA Outdoor Track and Field Championships. She finished 7th in 800 m prelims 2016 United States Olympic Trials (track and field).

On October 4, 2019 Maggie was inducted into the Cal Poly Athletics Hall of Fame.

== Personal life ==
In 2013, Vessey started a fashion line for track competition. Vessey currently resides in Park City, Utah. Vessey married Dean Kretschmar in Utah on 7/7/2017. She serves as assistant track coach at Park City High School and as a Global Real Estate Advisor at Engel & Volkers in Park City, Utah.
