= Campo do Tenente =

Coordinates: 25°59′S 49°41′W

- Municipality
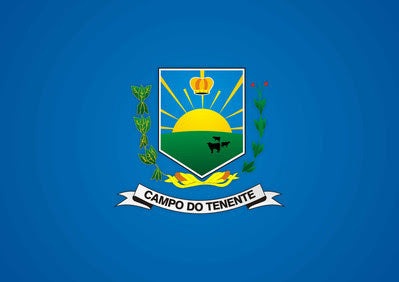
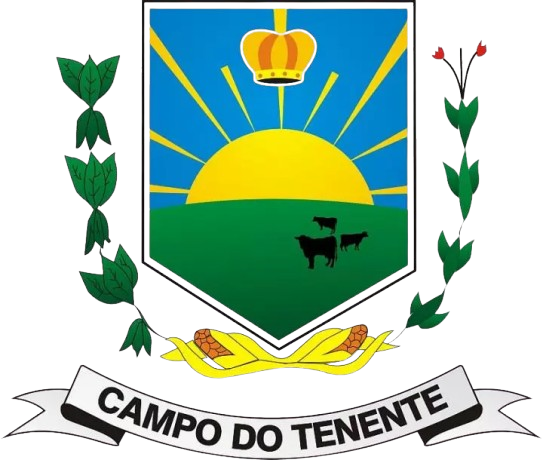
- Flag Seal

- Country: Brazil
- Region: Southern
- State: Paraná
- Mesoregion: Metropolitana de Curitiba
- Emancipated: 25 January 1961
- Installed: 29 October 1961

Government
  - Mayor: Weverton Willian Vizentin (União Brasil)
  - Deputy Mayor: Solange Maria de Lima Favaro (MDB)

Population (2020)
  - Total: 8,045
- Time zone: UTC−3 (BRT)
- CEP: 83870-00
- Area code: +55 41

Campo do Tenente is a municipality in the state of Paraná in the Southern Region of Brazil.

== See also ==
- List of municipalities in Paraná
