= Charlene Lipsey =

American athlete (born 1991)

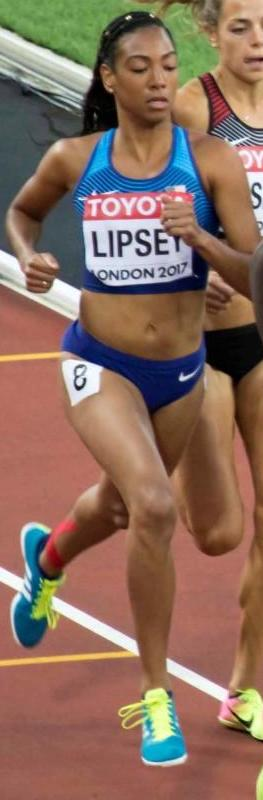
- Lipsey in 2017

Personal information
- Born: July 16, 1991 (age 35) Hempstead, New York, U.S.
- Height: 5 ft 6 in (1.68 m)

Sport
- Sport: Track
- Event: 800 meters
- College team: LSU
- Club: Juventus Running Club; Adidas 2013-21; Under Armour 2021-Present
- Turned pro: 2013
- Coached by: Derek Thompson

Achievements and titles
- Personal bests: 400 meters: 54.6; 800 meters: 1:57.38; 1500 meters: 4:10.44; Mile: 4:27.28
Medal record
Women's athletics
Representing the United States
IAAF World Relays
Gold medal – first place	2017 Bahamas	4x800

Charlene Lipsey (born July 16, 1991) is an American middle-distance runner who specializes in the 800 metres. She competed in the women's 800 metres at the 2017 World Championships in Athletics.

== Professional ==
Charlene Lipsey signed with Adidas in 2013 and trained at LSU until Fall 2016.

Lipsey moved to train with Philadelphia based Juventus Running Club and coach Derek Thompson.

Track star Charlene Lipsey received key to Hempstead Village in September 2017 from Mayor Don Ryan.

Charlene Lipsey was part of Team USA setting world indoor record in the February 3 at 2018 Millrose Games in 8:05.89 – Chrishuna Williams (2:05.10), Raevyn Rogers (2:00.45), Charlene Lipsey (2:01.98), Ajee' Wilson (1:58.37).

Charlene Lipsey won 2018 Sir Walter Miler in 4:27.28 in the same race Sara Vaughn, Cory McGee, Nicole Sifuentes, Kate Van Buskirk ran under 4:30.

Year	Competition	Venue	Position	Event	Notes
Representing the United States
2017	World Championships	London, England	7th	800 m	1:58.73
2017	World Relays	Nassau, Bahamas	1st	4 x 800 meters	8:16.36

=== USA National Track and field Championships ===
Year	Competition	Venue	Position	Event	Notes
2023	USA Outdoor Track and Field Championships	Eugene, Oregon	5th	800 meters	2:01.22
2022	USA Outdoor Track and Field Championships	Eugene, Oregon	12th	800 meters	2:02.09
2022	USA Indoor Track and Field Championships	Spokane, Washington	10th	800 meters	2:04.56
2018	USA Outdoor Track and Field Championships	Des Moines, Iowa	5th	800 meters	1:59.95
2018	USA Indoor Track and Field Championships	Albuquerque, New Mexico	6th	800 meters	2:05.45
2017	USA Outdoor Track and Field Championships	Sacramento, California	2nd	800 meters	1:58.01
2017	USA Indoor Track and Field Championships	Albuquerque, New Mexico	1st	1000 meters	2:37.97CR
2016	USA Track and Field Olympic Trials	Eugene, Oregon	15th	800 meters	2:05.15
2015	USA Outdoor Track and Field Championships	Eugene, Oregon	16th	800 meters	2:04.91
2015	USA Indoor Track and Field Championships	Boston, MA	4th	1000 meters	2:40.86
2014	USA Outdoor Track and Field Championships	Sacramento, California	6th	800 meters	2:01.02
2013	USA Outdoor Track and Field Championships	Des Moines, Iowa	20th	800 meters	2:03.91
2012	USA Track and Field Olympic Trials	Eugene, Oregon	17th	800 meters	2:03.74

== NCAA ==
For college, Lipsey chose to compete for the LSU Tigers track and field where she was an 8-Time All-American, Three-Time SEC Champion.

School Year	Southeastern Conference Indoor track and field	NCAA Division I Indoor track and field	SEC Outdoor Track and Field	NCAA Division I Outdoor Track and Field
2013 Senior	800 Meters, 1st, 2:02.48	800 Meters, 3rd, 2:02.47	800 Meters, 3rd, 2:05.62	800 Meters, 4th, 2:01.70
2013 Senior	DMR, 3rd, 11:23.01		1500 Meters, 11th, 4:24.82	
2012 Junior	800 Meters, 1st, 2:05.55	800 Meters, 7th, 2:06.44	800 Meters, 1st, 2:02.60	800 Meters, 2nd, 2:01.40
2012 Junior	DMR, 5th, 11:24.00		1500 Meters, 5th, 4:18.16	
2011 Sophomore	800 Meters, 3rd, 2:06.11	800 Meters, 13th, 2:08.10	800 Meters, 3rd, 2:05.88	800 Meters, 4th, 2:03.73
2011 Sophomore	DMR, 4th, 11:41.67			
2010 Freshman	800 Meters, 9th, 2:11.52		800 Meters, 7th, 2:08.61	800 Meters, 15th, 2:08.08
2010 Freshman	DMR, 7th, 12:01.19	4 x 400 meters, 2nd, 3:33.79	1500 meters, 8th, 4:28.15	

Lipsey graduated from Louisiana State University in 2013.

== High school ==
Lipsey won 2009 New York State Public High School Athletic Association 1A state 800 meters outdoor title in 2:08.67 & Lipsey won 2008 New York State Public High School Athletic Association 1A state 800 meters outdoor title in 2:07.46. Lipsey is a graduate of Hempstead High School (New York) where she was a record-setting 800 meters, 1500 meters and mile.

Year	State Indoor	State Outdoor
2009	1st, 600 meters 1:33.10	1st, 800 meters, 2:08.67
2008		1st, 800 meters, 2:07.46
