= Jessica Warner-Judd =

British middle-distance runner

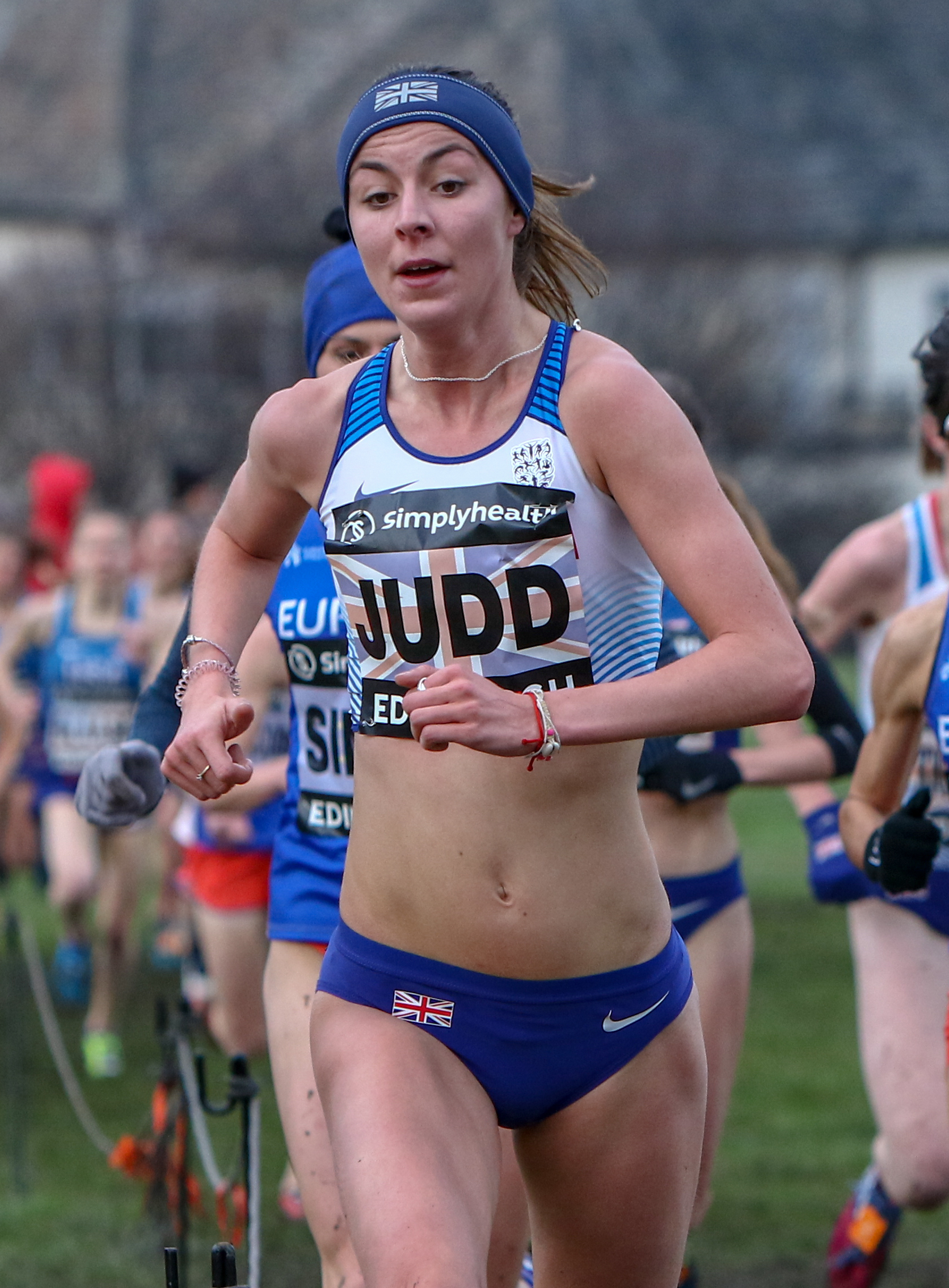
- Warner-Judd in 2018

Personal information
- Born: 7 January 1995 (age 31) Rochford, England
- Home town: Canvey Island, England
- Education: Loughborough University
- Height: 1.80 m (5 ft 11 in)
- Weight: 59 kg (130 lb)

Sport
- Country: Great Britain; England
- Sport: Athletics
- Event(s): Middle-, Long-distance running
- Club: Blackburn Harriers AC
Medal record
Women's athletics
Representing Great Britain
European Team Championships
| Gold medal – first place | 2013 Gateshead | 800 m |
World U20 Championships
| Silver medal – second place | 2012 Barcelona | 800 m |
World U18 Championships
| Bronze medal – third place | 2011 Villeneuve-d'Ascq | 800 m |
European Cross Country Championships
| Gold medal – first place | 2012 Budapest | U20 Team |
| Gold medal – first place | 2014 Samakov | U20 Team |
| Gold medal – first place | 2016 Chia | U23 Team |
| Gold medal – first place | 2017 Šamorín | U23 Team |
| Silver medal – second place | 2014 Samakov | U20 race |
| Bronze medal – third place | 2017 Šamorín | U23 race |
Universiade
| Gold medal – first place | 2019 Naples | 5000 m |
| Bronze medal – third place | 2017 Taipei | 5000 m |

Jessica Warner-Judd (born 7 January 1995) is an English middle- and long-distance runner. She won two individual medals in the Under-20 and U23 races at the European Cross Country Championships and a gold medal for the 5000 metres at the 2019 Universiade.

Warner-Judd took the bronze medal for the 800 metres at the 2011 World Youth Championships, and a silver in the event at the 2012 2012 World Junior Championships. She holds British U15 1500 metres record. She is a four-time national champion. Warner-Judd represented Great Britain at the 2020 Summer Olympics in Tokyo.

== Career ==
Born in Rochford, Judd, who has studied at Grays Convent High School and Castle View School, broke the British under-15 1500 metres record in July 2009, running 4:21.03. In 2011, she added two national under-17 records, with 9:08.5 for the 3000 metres in April and 4:14.21 for the 1500 m in May. Later that year at the World Youth Championships, she won a bronze medal in the 800 metres, with a time of 2:03.43. Also in 2011, she won her third consecutive 1500 m English Schools title.

Judd won a gold medal as a member of the British junior women's team at the 2012 European Cross Country Championships. She began the outdoor season by running 2:01.09 for 800 m in a BMC event. At the British Olympic trials in June, she finished third, ahead of UK number one Marilyn Okoro. Then in July at the 2012 World Junior Championships, she won a silver medal in the 800 m final in 2:00.96, which is a UK age 17 record. She went on to reach the 1500 m final, finishing fifth and smashing her previous personal best, with a time of 4:09.93 which set another UK age 17 best.

On 22 June 2013, Judd won the 800 m at the European Team Championships. She followed this up with victory at the Birmingham Grand Prix on 30 June 2013, running under two minutes for the first time in her career with 1:59.86. At the 2013 UK World Championship trials, she finished second to Marilyn Okoro, earning selection for the 2013 World Championships in Moscow, where she was eliminated in the heats, running 2:01.48.

In May 2014, Judd led the Prefontaine Classic 800 m as a season opener. In June that year, Judd improved her 800 m best to 1:59.77 in Oslo. In August, at the Commonwealth Games in Glasgow, she reached the 800 m final, finishing fourth in 2:01.91. Two weeks later at the European Championships in Zürich, she again reached the final, finishing seventh in 2:01.65.

In March 2017, Judd won the British Inter Counties Ladies' Cross Country Championships held at Loughborough, earning selection for the British team competing in the World Cross Country Championships later that month in Kampala. On 5 April that year, Judd ran 8:52.16 for 3000 m in Watford, to become only the fourth British woman to have broken two minutes for 800 m and nine minutes for 3000 m, after Christina Boxer, Kirsty Wade and Hannah England. A month later, again in Watford, she improved her 1500 m best to 4:05.20. Later that year, she finished second in the 1500 m at the British Athletics Championships, ensuring her qualification for the 2017 World Athletics Championships where she reached the semi-final of the 1500 m, having run a personal best in the heats.

In 2020, she became British champion when winning the 5000 metres event at the British Athletics Championships with a time of 15:37.52.

She retained her title in 2021, a year in which she also qualified for her first Olympic Games over both the 5000 m and 10,000 m. At the delayed 2020 Tokyo Olympics, Warner-Judd did not qualify from the heats in the former (15:09.47) and finished 17th at the latter (31:56.80).

In 2024, she collapsed while competing in the European Championships 10,000m, following a previous seizure three months earlier in another race, leading to a subsequent diagnosis of epilepsy.

== Statistics ==
Information taken from World Athletics profile unless otherwise noted.

=== Personal bests ===
- 800 metres – 1:59.77 (Oslo 2014)
- 1500 metres – 4:03.73 (London 2017)
- 3000 metres – 8:52.73 (Birmingham 2021)
- 5000 metres – 14:57.19 (Birmingham 2022)
- 10,000 metres – 30:35.93 (Eugene, OR 2022)

Road

- 5 kilometres – 15:36 (Barrowford 2020)
- 10 kilometres – 31:40 (Leeds 2021)
- Half marathon – 1:07:19 (Houston, TX 2023)
- Marathon – 2:24:45 (New York City, NY 2025)

=== National titles ===
- British Athletics Championships
  - 5000 metres: 2020, 2021
- British 10,000m Championships
  - 10,000 metres: 2022, 2023
