= Kelly Hetherington =

Australian middle-distance runner

Kelly Hetherington (born 10 March 1989) is an Australian middle-distance runner who competed in the 800 metres at the 2013 IAAF World Championships in Moscow.

She has a long string of games under her belt - winning the 2013 Australian 800m championships and taking silver in the 2011 Australian Championships.

She has made the Australian team for the 2013 World Athletics Championship (800m), 2014 Commonwealth Games (800m), 2015 World Relay Championships (4 × 800 m - Bronze medal) and the 2011 World Uni championships (800m).
