= Chrishuna Williams =

American middle-distance runner

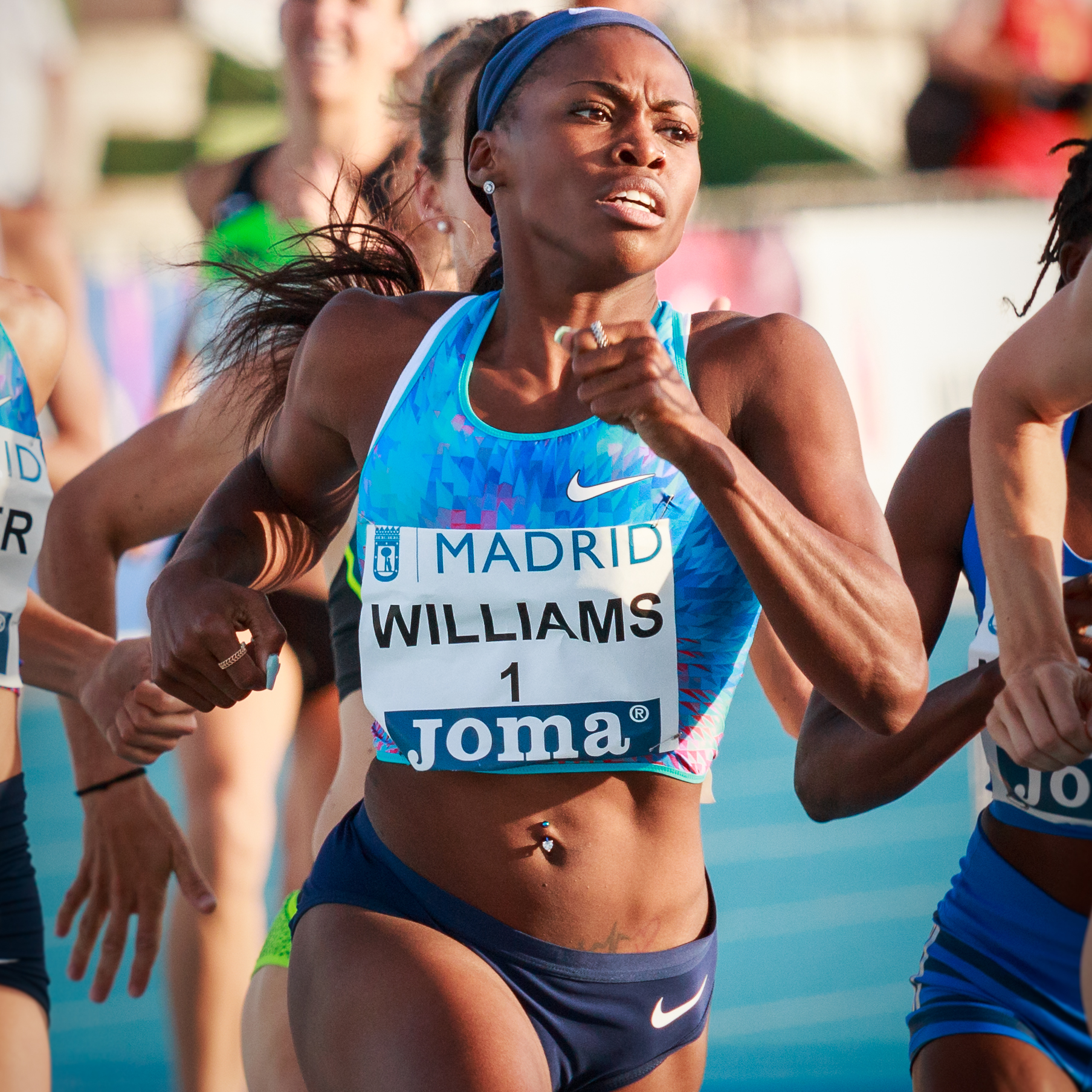

Personal information
- Born: March 31, 1993 (age 33)
- Height: 5 ft 4 in (1.63 m)

Sport
- Country: United States
- Event: 800 metres 400 metres
- College team: Arkansas Razorbacks
- Club: Nike
- Turned pro: 2015
- Coached by: Chris Johnson

Achievements and titles
- Personal best: 200 m: 24.21 400 m: 52.02 800 m: 1:59.59
Medal record
Women's athletics
Representing the United States
IAAF World Relays
Gold medal – first place	2017 Bahamas	4x800
2016 United States Olympic Trials (track and field)
Bronze medal – third place	2016 Eugene	800m

Chrishuna Williams (born March 31, 1993) is an American middle-distance runner.

== Professional ==
Williams formerly ran the 400 meters, but qualified for the 2016 Olympics in the 800 meters. Williams ran 2:01.19 in Athletics at the 2016 Summer Olympics – Women's 800 metres to represent United States and place 35th.

Chrishuna Williams ran 2:00.58 in 800 m final to place 5th at 2017 USA Outdoor Track and Field Championships. Williams ran 1:59.59 in 800 m final to place 3rd at 2016 United States Olympic Trials (track and field). Chrishuna Williams placed 17th in 800 meters at 2015 USA Outdoor Track and Field Championships in 2:03.54.

Williams was part of Team USA setting world indoor record in the 4 × 800 m relay February 3 at 2018 Millrose Games in 8:05.89 – Chrishuna Williams (2:05.10), Raevyn Rogers (2:00.45), Charlene Lipsey (2:01.98), Ajee' Wilson (1:58.37).

== NCAA ==
Williams was a ten-time NCAA Division I All-American for the University of Arkansas and won a national championship as part of the distance medley relay. Chrishuna Williams earned thirteen conference honors as a track and field finalist in the Southeastern Conference.

== Prep ==
A 2011 graduate of north Texas DeSoto High School, Chrishuna Williams won Texas Class 5A University Interscholastic League 4 × 400 m title in 3:41.41 this order: Maegan Cowan, Kierra Hamilton, Chrishuna Williams, Tia Gamble. Williams placed 4th at 2010 and 3rd at 2011 Texas 5A University Interscholastic League 400 m state championship finals.
