= Simoya Campbell =

Jamaican middle-distance runner

Personal information
- Born: 1 March 1994 (age 32)
- Education: University of Technology
- Height: 1.67 m (5 ft 6 in)
- Weight: 54 kg (119 lb)

Sport
- Sport: Track and field
- Event: 800 metres

Simoya Kadine Campbell (born 1 March 1994) is a Jamaican middle-distance runner competing primarily in the 800 metres. She won the silver medal at the 2015 Summer Universiade.

Her personal best in the event is 1:59.26 set in Gwangju in 2015.

== Competition record ==
Year	Competition	Venue	Position	Event	Notes
Representing Jamaica
2011	CARIFTA Games (U20)	Montego Bay, Jamaica	1st	800 m	2:08.77
2011	CARIFTA Games (U20)	Montego Bay, Jamaica	1st	4x400 m	3:31.47
2011	World Youth Championships	Lille, France	22nd (sf)	800 m	2:15.22
2012	CARIFTA Games (U20)	Hamilton, Bermuda	1st	800 m	2:08.48
2012	CARIFTA Games (U20)	Hamilton, Bermuda	1st	1500 m	4:49.56
2012	CARIFTA Games (U20)	Hamilton, Bermuda	1st	4x400 m	3:34.27
2012	World Junior Championships	Barcelona, Spain	12th (h)	800 m	2:06.18
2013	CARIFTA Games (U20)	Nassau, Bahamas	1st	800 m	2:06.22
2013	CARIFTA Games (U20)	Nassau, Bahamas	1st	4x400 m	3:34.36
2013	Central American and Caribbean Championships	Morelia, Mexico	2nd	800 m	2:03.08
2014	IAAF World Relays	Nassau, Bahamas	5th	4x800 m	8:17.22
2014	Commonwealth Games	Glasgow, United Kingdom	28th (h)	800 m	2:15.00
2015	IAAF World Relays	Nassau, Bahamas	5th	4x800 m	8:16:04
2015	Universiade	Gwangju, South Korea	2nd	800 m	1:59.26
2015	World Championships	Beijing, China	28th (h)	800 m	2:01.43
2016	Olympic Games	Rio de Janeiro, Brazil	42nd (h)	800 m	2:02.07
2018	Central American and Caribbean Games	Barranquilla, Colombia	4th	800 m	2:03.16
2018	NACAC Championships	Toronto, Canada	6th	800 m	2:00.98

== Personal bests ==
Outdoor

- 400 metres – 53.22 (Kingston 2015)
- 800 metres – 1:59.26 (Gwangju 2015)
- 1500 metres – 4:34.69 (Kingston 2012)
- 3000 metres – 10:42.08 (Kingston 2015)
