= Lora Storey =

Australian middle-distance runner

Personal information
- Nationality: Australian
- Born: 19 October 1989 (age 36)

Sport
- Sport: Middle-distance running
- Event: 800 metres

Lora Storey (born 19 October 1989) is an Australian middle-distance runner. She competed in the women's 800 metres at the 2017 World Championships in Athletics.
