= Manal El-Bahraoui =

Moroccan-Bahraini middle-distance runner

Manal El Bahraoui
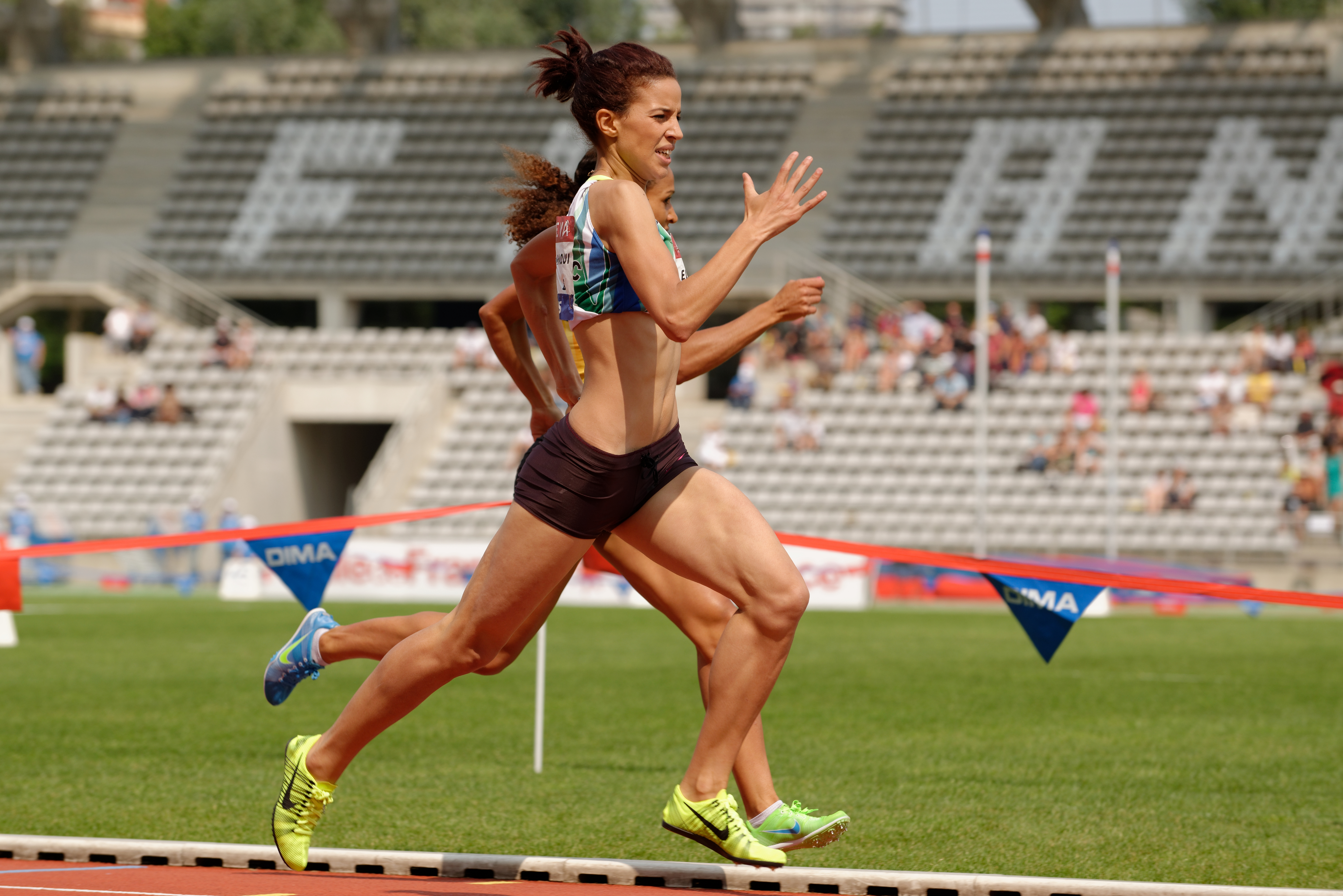
- in 2013
- Born: 6 January 1994 (age 32)
- Known for: 800m runner
- Spouse: Hicham Figuini

Manal El Bahraoui (Arabic: منال البحراوي, romanized: Manāl al-Baḥrāwī; born 6 January 1994) is a Moroccan-Bahraini middle-distance runner. She won an international bronze medal as a junior in 2012 for Morocco and in 2018 she won a bronze medal for Bahrain.

== Life ==
El Bahraoui was born in 1994.

In July 2012 she qualified for the 800m final at the 14th World Junior Championships in Barcelona. She was one of twelve athletes in the Moroccan team. She was third inher heat and third again in the final winning a bronze medal.

In 2013 she was one of the athletes named following a rumour that seven Moroccan athletes were considering changing their allegiance to Bahrain. The others named were Tarik Ziad and Ayoub Touili. Moroccan officials, Ahmed Tanani and M'hamed Nouri, were quoted saying that El Bahraoui had given assurances that she was loyal to Morocco and that agreements had been made between Morocco and Bahrain to prevent athletes from changing nationalities. However El Bahraoui had been selected for the 880m race at the Francophone games in Nice but she had failed to appear. He said that the Royal Moroccan Athletics Federation was angry.

The 2018 Asian Games was held at Gelora Bung Karno Stadium, in Jakarta, in August and El Bahraoui was on the Bahraini team and she won a bronze medal in the 800m. She was beaten by the Chinese runner Wang Chunyu and Margarita Mukasheva of Kazakhstan.

She became the National Champion.
