= Irina Podyalovskaya =

Soviet middle-distance runner (1959–2024)

Personal information
- Born: 9 October 1959 Vyshenka, Mogilev Oblast, Byelorussian SSR, USSR
- Died: 13 August 2024 (aged 64)

Achievements and titles
- Personal best: 4 × 800 metres relay: 7:50.17 (1984, WR)
Medal record
Women's Athletics
Representing the Soviet Union
Summer Universiade
Gold medal – first place	1983 Edmonton	800 metres

Irina Podyalovskaya (9 October 1959 – 13 August 2024) was a middle-distance runner who represented the USSR in the 1970s and the early 1980s. She set her personal best in the women's 800 metres (1:55.69) on 22 June 1984 at a meet in Kiev.

Podyalovskaya holds the current world record in the rarely contested 4 × 800 metres relay (7:50.17 minutes with Nadezhda Olizarenko, Lyubov Gurina and Lyudmila Borisova).

Podyalovskaya died on 13 August 2024, at the age of 64.

== Sources ==
- Irina Podyalovskaya at World Athletics
- Profile
