= Lyudmila Borisova =

Russian middle-distance runner (born 1966)

Personal information
- Born: 3 August 1966 (age 59) Leningrad, Soviet Union

Sport
- Sport: Track and field
Medal record
Representing Soviet Union
Summer Universiade
Gold medal – first place	1983 Edmonton	4x400m relay

Lyudmila Borisova (Russian: Людмила Борисова; born 3 August 1966) is a retired Soviet and Russian runner who specialized in the 3000 metres.

She holds the current world record in the rarely contested 4 x 800 metres relay (7:50.17 minutes with Nadezhda Olizarenko, Lyubov Gurina and Irina Podyalovskaya).

== International competitions ==
Year	Competition	Venue	Position	Event	Notes
Representing the Soviet Union
1989	World Indoor Championships	Budapest, Hungary	6th	3000 m	9:04.75
1991	World Championships	Tokyo, Japan	13th	3000 m	8:51.49
1991	Universiade	Sheffield, United Kingdom	4th	3000 m	
Representing Russia
1993	World Championships	Stuttgart, Germany	8th	3000 m	8:40.78
1994	Goodwill Games	St. Petersburg, Russia	4th	3000 m	8:48.77
1994	European Championships	Helsinki, Finland	5th	3000 m	8:41.71
1995	World Championships	Gothenburg, Sweden	5th	1500 m	4:04.78
1996	Olympic Games	Atlanta, United States	7th	1500 m	4:05.90
