= Ajeé Wilson =

American middle-distance runner (born 1994)

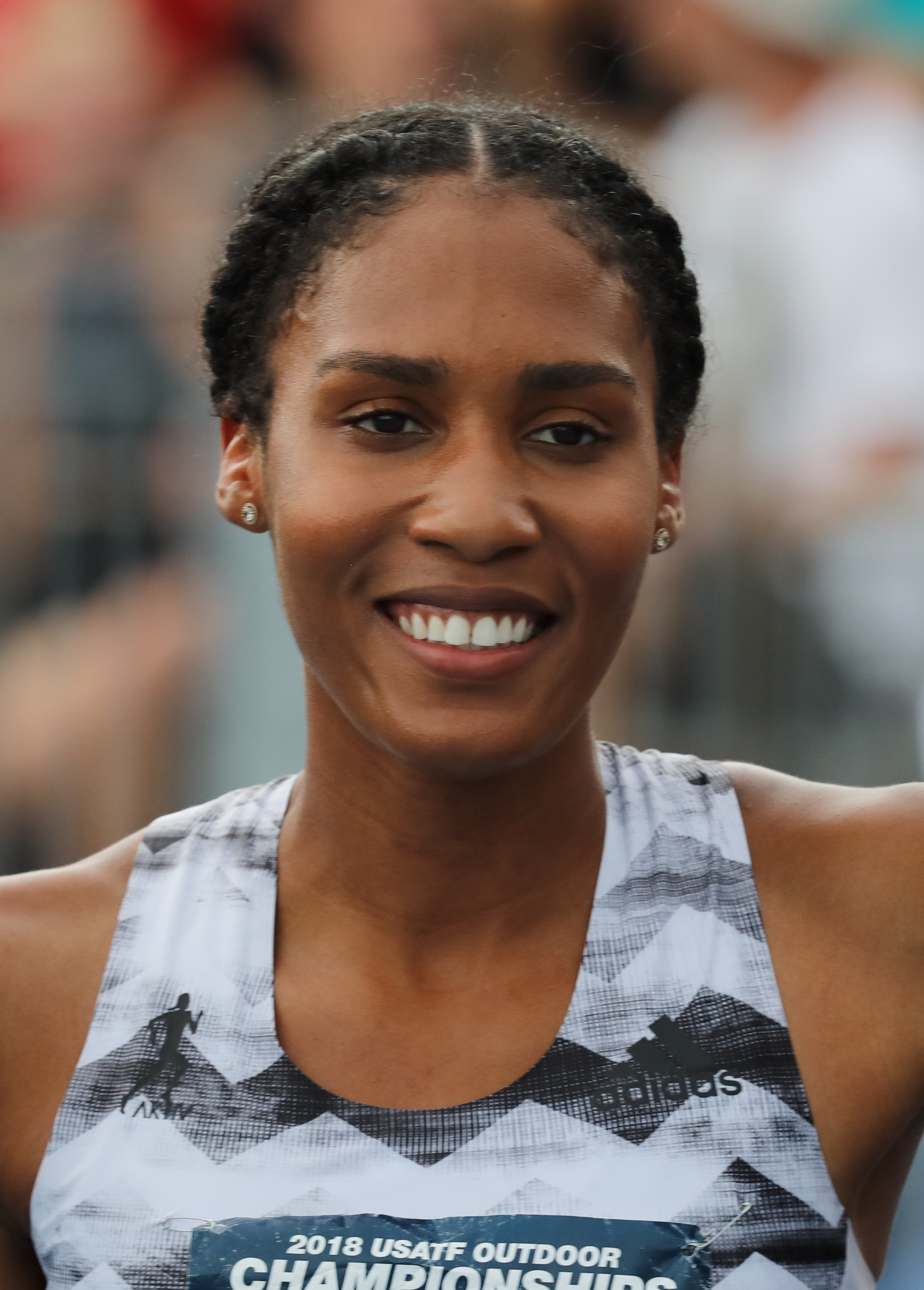
- Wilson at the 2018 USA Outdoor Championships

Personal information
- Nationality: American
- Born: May 8, 1994 (age 32) Neptune, New Jersey U.S.
- Home town: Neptune, New Jersey, U.S.
- Education: Temple University
- Height: 5 ft 8 in (173 cm)
- Weight: 135 lb (61 kg)

Sport
- Sport: Track and field
- Event: 800 metres
- Club: Juventus Track Club

Achievements and titles
- World finals: 2013; 800 m, 5th; 2017; 800 m, Bronze; 2019; 800 m, Bronze; 2022; 800 m, 8th
- Personal bests: 400 m: 53.63 (Chester 2014); 600 m: 1:22.39 ABP (Berlin 2017); 800 m: 1:55.61 (Monaco 2017); 1500 m: 4:05.18 (Swarthmore 2018); Indoors; 800 m: 1:58.29i AR (New York City 2020)
Medal record
Women's track and field
Representing the United States
World Championships
Bronze medal – third place	2017 London	800 m
Bronze medal – third place	2019 Doha	800 m
World Indoor Championships
Gold medal – first place	2022 Belgrade	800 m
Silver medal – second place	2016 Portland	800 m
Silver medal – second place	2018 Birmingham	800 m
World Relays
Gold medal – first place	2014 Nassau	4 × 800 m relay
Gold medal – first place	2015 Nassau	Distance medley
Diamond League
First place	2019	800 m
Continental Cup
Silver medal – second place	2014 Marrakesh	800 m
Silver medal – second place	2018 Ostrava	800 m
World Junior Championships
Gold medal – first place	2012 Barcelona	800 m
World Youth Championships
Gold medal – first place	2011 Lille	800 m
NACAC Championships in Athletics
Gold medal – first place	2018 Toronto	800 m
Gold medal – first place	2022 Freeport	800 m

Ajeé Wilson (/ˈɑːdʒeɪ/ AH-jay; born May 8, 1994) is an American middle-distance runner who specializes in the 800 meters. She is the 2022 World indoor champion at the 800 meter distance, after earning silver medals in 2016 and 2018. Wilson won bronze medals at both the 2017 and 2019 World Athletics Championships. She is the second-fastest American of all time in the event with a time of 1m 55.61s, and she holds North American indoor record.

Wilson won titles in the 800 m at both the 2011 World Youth Championships and 2012 World Junior Championships. Her winning time of 2:00.91 at the latter is the fourth-fastest time run by a high schooler behind Mary Cain, Kim Gallagher, and Natalie Dumas.

== Personal life ==
Wilson attended Academy of Allied Health & Science in Neptune Township, New Jersey, until 2012. She originally committed to attend Florida State University, before deciding to turn professional. She graduated from Temple University in 2016, but trains with her coach Derek Thompson and the Juventus Track Club of Philadelphia.

== Career ==
=== 2013 ===
In 2012, she committed to run for the Florida State Seminoles under Karen Harvey, but days before the fall semester, she decided to focus on a pro career and return to her coach Derek Thompson at Temple University. The decision paid off at the IAAF Moscow 2013 World Championships where she ran the quickest junior 800 m of 1:58.21 – a North American and USA junior record – to place fifth.

=== 2014 ===
Wilson won her Second U.S. Senior Indoor 800-meter title at the 2014 USA Indoor Track and Field Championships in Albuquerque, New Mexico, in 2:00.43. Wilson won her first U.S. Senior Outdoor 800-meter title at the 2014 USA Outdoor Track and Field Championships in Sacramento, California, in 1:58.70. On July 18, Wilson ran a world leading mark of 1:57.67 to win the Diamond League Herculis Monaco.

=== 2015 ===
Wilson won the Armory Invitational in 2:01.7 on January 31 in New York City.

At the USA Outdoor Track and Field Championships in Eugene, Oregon Wilson placed 3rd in the 800 m in 2:00.05 despite losing a shoe in the last 200 meters. She qualified to represent the U.S. for the 800 m in the 2015 World Championships in Athletics in Beijing, China but did not compete due to injury.

=== 2017 ===
Wilson won the New York Road Runners Armory Invitational in New York City 600 m in 1:24.28, the fourth-fastest time in history and the second-fastest by an American behind only Alysia Montaño‘s U.S. national record of 1:23.59 set on this same Armory oval in 2013.

At the USA Outdoor Track and Field Championships in Sacramento, Wilson placed 1st in the 800 meters in 1:57.78, to represent the U.S. for the 800 m in the 2017 World Championships in Athletics in London.

On July 21, 2017, Wilson ran 1:55.61 at the Diamond League event in Monaco to break the U.S. record by nearly 1 second. This time ranks Wilson at number 20 on the IAAF all-time list.

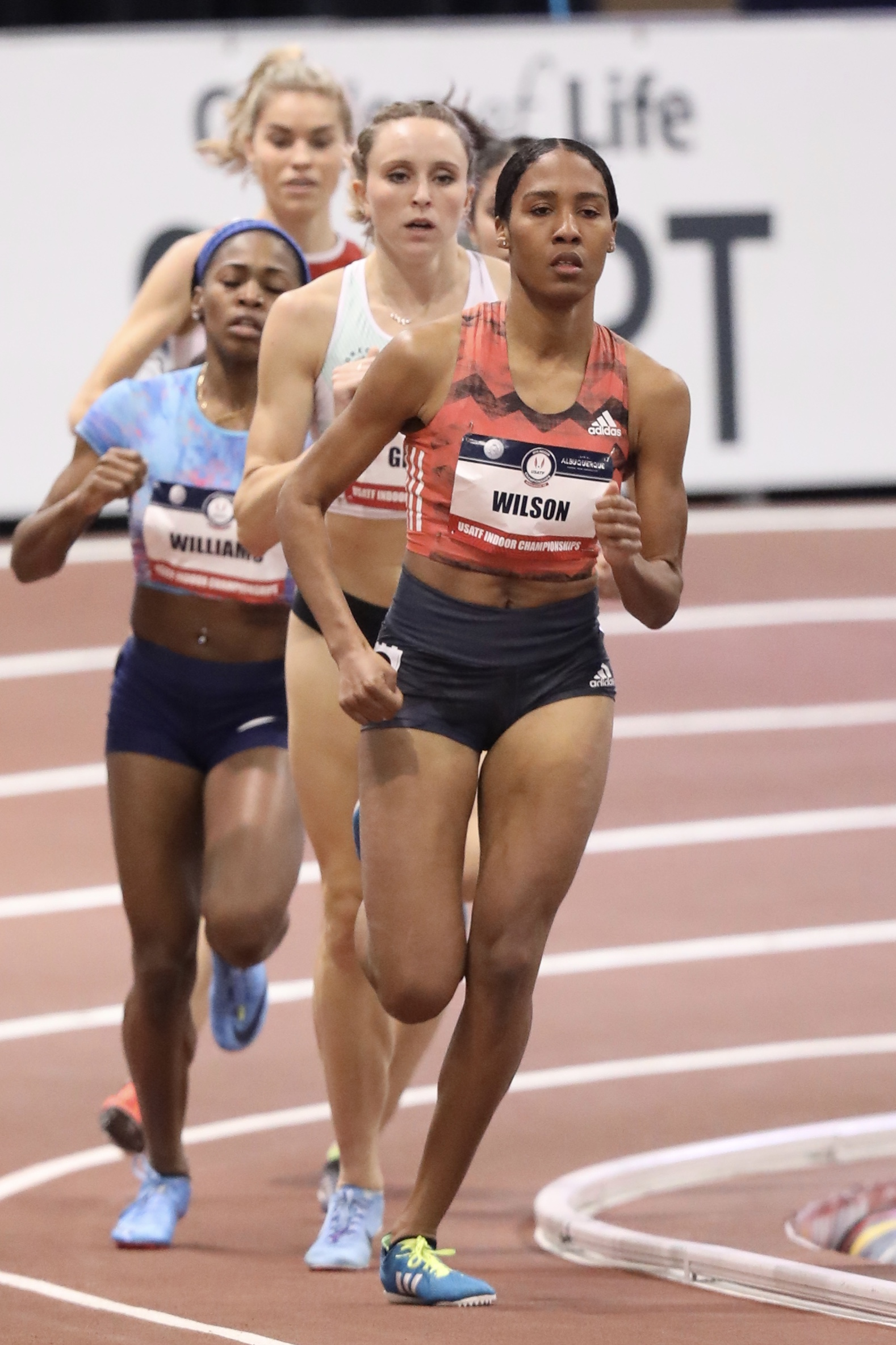
Wilson at the 2018 USA Indoor Track and Field Championships

=== 2018 ===
Wilson won silver medal in World Indoor Championships at 800 m.

Wilson was part of the Team USA squad setting a world indoor record in the 4 × 800 m relay on February 3 at the 2018 Millrose Games in 8:05.89 – a squad that featured Chrishuna Williams (2:05.10), Raevyn Rogers (2:00.45), Charlene Lipsey (2:01.98), Ajeé Wilson (1:58.37).

Wilson won 800 m gold at 2018 USA Indoor Track and Field Championships in Albuquerque, New Mexico, in 2:01.60, and USA Outdoor Track and Field Championships in 1:58.18.

Wilson won 800 m gold at 2018 NACAC Championships in Toronto, Canada, in a championship record and stadium record 1:57.52.

=== 2019 ===
Wilson won in 1:58.60 at 2019 Millrose Games to set the U.S. Indoor Track and Field 800 m record & NACAC 800 m record.

On July 28, at the USA Outdoor Track and Field Championships in Des Moines, Wilson placed 1st in the 800 meters in 1:57.72, to represent the U.S. for the 800 m in the 2019 World Championships in Athletics in Doha, Qatar.

== Achievements ==
=== Major competition record ===
Representing the United States
Year	Competition	Venue	Position	Event	Result
2010	World Junior Championships	Moncton, Canada	5th	800 m	2:04.18
2011	World Youth Championships	Lille, France	1st	800 m	2:02.64
2012	World Junior Championships	Barcelona, Spain	1st	800 m	2:00.91
2013	World Championships	Moscow, Russia	5th	800 m	1:58.21
2014	World Indoor Championship	Sopot, Poland	10th (h)	800 m i	2:02.90
2014	World Relay Championships	Nassau, Bahamas	1st	4 × 800 m relay	8:01.58
2015	World Relay Championships	Nassau, Bahamas	1st	Distance medley relay	10:36.50 (WR)
2016	World Indoor Championship	Portland, United States	2nd	800 m i	2:00.27
2016	Olympic Games	Rio de Janeiro, Brazil	12th (sf)	800 m	1:59.75
2017	Monaco Herculis	Fontvieille, Monaco	3rd	800 m	1:55.61 (PB)
2017	World Championships	London, United Kingdom	3rd	800 m	1:56.65
2018	World Indoor Championship	Birmingham, United Kingdom	2nd	800 m i	1:58.99
2018	Prefontaine Classic	Eugene, United States	2nd	800 m	1:56.86
2018	NACAC Championships	Toronto, Canada	1st	800 m	1:57.52 (CR)
2018	Weltklasse Zürich	Zurich, Switzerland	2nd	800 m	1:57.86
2019	Prefontaine Classic	Palo Alto, United Kingdom	2nd	800 m	1:58.36
2019	World Championships	Doha, Qatar	3rd	800 m	1:58.84
2021	Olympic Games	Tokyo, Japan	16th (sf)	800 m	2:00.79
2021	Prefontaine Classic	Eugene, United States	7th	800 m	2:00.21
2022	World Indoor Championships	Belgrade, Serbia	1st	800 m i	1:59.09 SB
2022	World Championships	Eugene, United States	8th	800 m	2:00.19
2022	NACAC Championships	Freeport, Bahamas	1st	800 m	1:58.47

=== Circuit wins ===
- Diamond League champion 800 metres: 2019
  - 2014 (2) (800 m): London Grand Prix in Glasgow, Monaco Herculis
  - 2015 (1) (800 m): New York Grand Prix
  - 2019 (4) (800 m): Stockholm Bauhaus-galan, Monaco Herculis, Birmingham Grand Prix, Brussels Memorial Van Damme
  - 2022 (1) (800 m): Kamila Skolimowska Memorial
- World Continental Tour Gold level
  - 2022 (1) (800 m): USATF Bermuda Games

=== National Championships ===
Year	Competition	Venue	Position	Event	Result
2007	AAU Junior Olympic Games	Knoxville, Tennessee	1st	Sub-Youth 3000 m	10:13.41 CR
2008	AAU Junior Olympic Games	Detroit, Michigan	6th	Youth 3000 m	11:04.98
2008	AAU Junior Olympic Games	Detroit, Michigan	1st	Youth 1500 m	4:43.53
2008	AAU Junior Olympic Games	Detroit, Michigan	1st	Youth 800 m	2:17.00
2009	AAU Junior Olympic Games	Des Moines, Iowa	6th	Intermediate 400 m	56.21
2010	USA Junior Outdoor Track and Field Championships	Des Moines, Iowa	1st	800 m	2:05.75
2011	2011 United States World Youth Trials (track and field)	Eugene, Oregon	1st	800 m	2:09.39
2012	U.S. Olympic Trials	Eugene, Oregon	14th	800 m	2:04.96
2012	USA Junior Outdoor Track and Field Championships	Bloomington, Indiana	1st	800 m	2:04.86
2013	USA Indoor Track and Field Championships	Albuquerque, New Mexico	1st	800 m	2:02.64
2013	USA Outdoor Track and Field Championships	Des Moines, Iowa	3rd	800 m	1:59.55
2014	USA Indoor Track and Field Championships	Albuquerque, New Mexico	1st	800 m	2:00.43
2014	USA Outdoor Track and Field Championships	Sacramento, California	1st	800 m	1:58.70
2015	USA Indoor Track and Field Championships	Boston, Massachusetts	6th	600 m	1:39.39
2015	USA Outdoor Track and Field Championships	Eugene, Oregon	3rd	800 m	2:00.05
2016	USA Indoor Track and Field Championships	Portland, Oregon	1st	800 m	2:00.87
2016	U.S. Olympic Trials	Eugene, Oregon	2nd	800 m	1:59.51
2017	USA Indoor Track and Field Championships	Albuquerque, New Mexico	1st	600 m	1:23.84CR
2017	USA Outdoor Track and Field Championships	Sacramento, California	1st	800 m	1:57.78
2018	USA Indoor Track and Field Championships	Albuquerque, New Mexico	1st	800 m	2:01.60
2018	USA Outdoor Track and Field Championships	Des Moines, Iowa	1st	800 m	1:58.18
2019	USA Indoor Track and Field Championships	Staten Island, New York City	1st	1000 m	2:34.71
2019	USA Outdoor Track and Field Championships	Des Moines, Iowa	1st	800 m	1:57.72
2020	USA Indoor Track and Field Championships	Albuquerque, New Mexico	1st	800 m	2:01.98
2021	U.S. Olympic Trials	Eugene, Oregon	3rd	800 m	1:58.39
2022	USA Indoor Track and Field Championships	Spokane, Washington	1st	800 m	2:01.72
2022	USA Outdoor Track and Field Championships	Eugene, Oregon	2nd	800 m	1:57.23

=== Personal bests ===
	Event	Time	Location	Date
Indoor	400 m	59.55	Toms River, United States	December 28, 2011
Indoor	500 m	1:09.63	Staten Island, United States	January 14, 2017
Indoor	600 m	1:23.84	Albuquerque, United States	March 5, 2017
Indoor	800 m	1:58.29 AR	New York City, United States	February 8, 2020
Indoor	1000 m	2:34.71	New York City, United States	February 24, 2019
Indoor	Mile	4:36.84	Staten Island, United States	January 13, 2018
Indoor	4 × 800 m	8:05.89 WR	New York City, United States	February 3, 2018
Outdoor	400 m	53.63	Chester, United States	April 19, 2014
Outdoor	600 m	1:22.39 ABP	Berlin, Germany	August 27, 2017
Outdoor	800 m	1:55.61	Fontvieille, Monaco	July 21, 2017
Outdoor	1000 m	2:44.05	Brussels, Belgium	September 6, 2013
Outdoor	1500 m	4:05.18	Swarthmore, United States	May 14, 2018
Outdoor	Mile	4:33.57	South Huntington, United States	August 31, 2016
Outdoor	4 × 800 m	8:01.58	Nassau, Bahamas	May 25, 2014
Outdoor	DMR	10:36.50 WR	Nassau, Bahamas	May 2, 2015

Awards
Preceded by Trevor Barron	USA Track & Field Youth Athlete of the Year; 2011	Succeeded by Sydney Holden
