= 2011 European Team Championships Super League =

Athletics team competitions

- Host city: (Sweden) Stockholm
- Nations: 12
- Events: 40 (20 men, 20 women)
- Dates: 18–19 June 2011
- Main venue: Stockholm Olympic Stadium

The 2011 European Team Championships Super League was the Super League of the 3rd edition of the European Team Championships (European Athletics Team Championships from 2013 edition), the 2011 European Team Championships, which took place on 18 and 19 June 2011 in Stockholm, Sweden. As with the previous championships there were a couple of rules applying specifically to this competition, such as the limit of three attempts in the throwing events, long jump and triple jump (only the top four were allowed the fourth attempt) and the limit of four misses total in the high jump and pole vault.

== Final standings ==
=== Original standings ===
Pos	Country	Pts
1	Russia	385
2	Germany	331.5
3	Ukraine	304
4	Great Britain	289
5	France	284
6	Poland	264
7	Spain	246
8	Italy	237
9	Belarus	220
10	Czech Republic	211
11	Portugal	177.5
12	Sweden	159

Note: After the results of several athletes banned for doping were retroactively voided, points had to be reallocated. This resulted in the originally relegated Czech Republic being one place higher than Belarus.

=== Updated standings ===
Pos	Country	Pts
1	Germany	339
2	Russia	298.5
3	Ukraine	297
4	France	295
5	United Kingdom	287
6	Poland	275
7	Italy	252
8	Spain	251
9	Czech Republic	221
10	Belarus	209.5
11	Portugal	191.5
12	Sweden	172

== Men ==
=== 100 metres ===
Wind:
Heat 1: -0.6 m/s
Heat 2: +1.0 m/s

Rank	Heat	Lane	Name	Nationality	React	Time	Notes	Points
1	2	4	Christophe Lemaitre	France	0.143	9.95	CR, EL, NR	12
2	2	5	Dwain Chambers	Great Britain	0.151	10.07		11
3	2	3	Francis Obikwelu	Portugal	0.149	10.22		10
4	2	6	Dariusz Kuć	Poland	0.185	10.24		9
5	2	7	Emanuele di Gregorio	Italy	0.171	10.35		8
6	1	3	Ángel David Rodríguez	Spain	0.154	10.39	SB	7
7	1	5	Aleksandr Khyutte	Russia	0.158	10.46		6
8	1	2	Tobias Unger	Germany	0.145	10.47		5
9	1	6	Aliaksandr Linnik	Belarus	0.190	10.53		4
10	2	2	Serhiy Smelyk	Ukraine	0.157	10.54		3
11	1	7	Stefan Tärnhuvud	Sweden	0.162	10.58		2
12	1	4	Jan Veleba	Czech Republic	0.158	10.62		1

=== 200 metres ===
Wind:
Heat 1: -1.8 m/s
Heat 2: -2.8 m/s

Rank	Heat	Lane	Name	Nationality	React	Time	Notes	Points
1	2	4	Christophe Lemaitre	France	0.158	20.28	CR	12
2	1	5	Kamil Kryński	Poland	0.179	20.83	SB	11
3	1	2	Aliaksandr Linnik	Belarus	0.170	20.90	SB	10
4	2	6	Pavel Maslák	Czech Republic	0.202	20.91		9
5	1	7	Matteo Galvan	Italy	0.178	20.93		8
6	2	5	Daniel Talbot	Great Britain	0.209	20.96		7
7	2	3	Johan Wissman	Sweden	0.189	21.10		6
8	1	3	Roman Smirnov	Russia	0.164	21.14	SB	5
9	1	4	Ángel David Rodríguez	Spain	0.152	21.33		4
10	2	7	Arnaldo Abrantes	Portugal	0.154	21.34		3
11	2	2	Miguel Rigau	Germany	0.165	21.44		2
12	1	6	Ruslan Perestyuk	Ukraine	0.189	21.79		1

=== 400 metres ===
Rank	Heat	Lane	Name	Nationality	React	Time	Notes	Points
1	2	3	Maksim Dyldin	Russia	0.204	45.82	SB	12
2	2	6	Thomas Schneider	Germany	0.215	45.98		11
3	2	7	Marco Vistalli	Italy	0.244	45.99		10
4	2	2	Marcin Marciniszyn	Poland	0.170	46.28		9
5	2	5	Teddy Venel	France	0.181	46.33		8
6	1	4	Johan Wissman	Sweden	0.201	46.35	SB	7
7	2	4	Conrad Williams	Great Britain	0.201	46.44		6
8	1	6	Mark Ujakpor	Spain	0.171	46.69		5
9	1	5	Volodymyr Burakov	Ukraine	0.282	46.80		4
10	1	2	Dzmitry Paluyan	Belarus	0.227	47.15	SB	3
11	1	7	João Ferreira	Portugal	0.176	47.65		2
12	1	3	Tomáš Bošek	Czech Republic	0.261	48.02		1

=== 800 metres ===
Rank	Name	Nationality	Time	Notes	Points
1	Adam Kszczot	Poland	1:46.50		12
2	Jeff Lastennet	France	1:46.70		11
3	Gareth Warburton	Great Britain	1:46.95	SB	10
4	Mario Scapini	Italy	1:47.20	PB	9
5	Anis Ananenka	Belarus	1:47.29		8
6	Oleh Kayafa	Ukraine	1:47.42		7
7	Joni Jaako	Sweden	1:47.61	SB	6
8	Robin Schembera	Germany	1:47.79		5
9	Ivan Tukhtachev	Russia	1:48.27	SB	4
10	Antonio Manuel Reina	Spain	1:48.56		3
11	António Rodrigues	Portugal	1:50.45		2
12	Milan Kocourek	Czech Republic	1:59.28		1

=== 1500 metres ===
Rank	Name	Nationality	Time	Note	Points
1	Manuel Olmedo	Spain	3:38.63	CR	12
2	Valentin Smirnov	Russia	3:38.89	PB	11
3	James Shane	Great Britain	3:39.21		10
4	Carsten Schlangen	Germany	3:39.86		9
5	Bartosz Nowicki	Poland	3:40.48		8
6	Jakub Holuša	Czech Republic	3:40.69		7
7	Oleksandr Borysyuk	Ukraine	3:40.83	SB	6
8	Florian Carvalho	France	3:41.25		5
9	Lukas Rifesser	Italy	3:44.45		4
10	Johan Rogestedt	Sweden	3:45.95	PB	3
11	Maksim Yushchanka	Belarus	3:46.30	PB	2
12	Rui Pinto	Portugal	3:49.17		1

=== 3000 metres ===
Rank	Name	Nationality	Time	Notes	Points
1	Juan Carlos Higuero	Spain	8:03.43	SB	12
2	Yegor Nikolayev	Russia	8:03.80	PB	11
3	Rui Silva	Portugal	8:03.88		10
4	Andy Baddeley	Great Britain	8:03.97	SB	9
5	Yoann Kowal	France	8:04.77		8
6	Mykola Labovskyy	Ukraine	8:05.17		7
7	Stefano La Rosa	Italy	8:05.70	SB	6
8	Siarhei Platonau	Belarus	8:11.05		5
9	Rico Schwarz	Germany	8:15.04		4
10	Erik Johansson	Sweden	8:15.93		3
11	Lukáš Kourek	Czech Republic	8:20.88	SB	2
12	Krystian Zalewski	Poland	8:21.61	SB	1

=== 5000 metres ===
Rank	Name	Nationality	Time	Notes	Points
1	Jesús España	Spain	13:39.25	CR	12
2	Serhiy Lebid	Ukraine	13:39.75		11
3	Andy Vernon	Great Britain	13:40.15		10
4	Yevgeniy Rybakov	Russia	13:40.63	SB	9
5	Siarhei Chabiarak	Belarus	13:41.19	PB	8
6	Łukasz Parszczyński	Poland	13:42.21	PB	7
7	Yohan Durand	France	13:44.71	SB	6
8	Ahmed El Mazoury	Italy	13:45.89		5
9	Youssef El Kalai	Portugal	13:56.92		4
10	Arne Gabius	Germany	14:01.88		3
11	Milan Kocourek	Czech Republic	14:25.30		2
12	Adil Bouafif	Sweden	14:44.67		1

=== 3000 metres steeplechase ===
Rank	Name	Nationality	Time	Notes	Points
1	Vincent Zouaoui Dandrieux	France	8:30.85	SB	12
2	Steffen Uliczka	Germany	8:31.01	SB	11
~~3~~	Ildar Minshin	Russia	~~8:34.56~~	DQ (doping)	0
3	Vadym Slobodenyuk	Ukraine	8:37.19		10
4	Abdelaziz Merzougui	Spain	8:38.75		9
5	Patrick Nasti	Italy	8:40.30		8
6	Tomasz Szymkowiak	Poland	8:41.50		7
7	Alberto Paulo	Portugal	8:44.17		6
8	Luke Gunn	Great Britain	8:45.41		5
9	Illia Slavenski	Belarus	8:49.63		4
10	Eric Senorski	Sweden	8:53.14		3
11	Jan Kreisinger	Czech Republic	9:02.24		2

=== 110 metres hurdles ===
Rank	Heat	Lane	Name	Nationality	React	Time	Note	Points
1	2	5	Andy Turner	Great Britain	0.136	13.42		12
2	2	4	Garfield Darien	France	0.189	13.64		11
3	1	3	Jackson Quiñónez	Spain	0.171	13.71	SB	10
4	2	6	Artur Noga	Poland	0.171	13.72		9
5	1	5	Philip Nossmy	Sweden	0.174	13.73		8
6	2	3	Konstantin Shabanov	Russia	0.160	13.76		6.5
6	1	6	Maksim Lynsha	Belarus	0.173	13.76	SB	6.5
8	2	1	Emanuele Abate	Italy	0.164	13.85		5
9	2	2	Erik Balnuweit	Germany	0.148	13.98		4
10	1	1	Martin Mazác	Czech Republic	0.179	14.00		3
11	1	2	Rasul Dabó	Portugal	0.148	14.14		2
12	1	4	Serhiy Kopanayko	Ukraine	0.166	14.57		1

=== 400 metres hurdles ===
Rank	Heat	Lane	Name	Nationality	React	Time	Notes	Points
1	2	6	David Greene	Great Britain	0.178	49.21	CR	12
2	2	7	Georg Fleischhauer	Germany	0.187	49.56	PB	11
3	2	5	Aleksandr Derevyagin	Russia	0.171	49.70		10
4	2	2	Jorge Paula	Portugal	0.166	50.42		9
5	2	4	Stanislav Melnykov	Ukraine	0.221	50.53		8
6	1	4	Josef Prorok	Czech Republic	0.209	50.60		7
7	1	5	Giacomo Panizza	Italy	0.242	50.60	SB	6
8	1	7	Diego Cabello	Spain	0.172	50.84	PB	5
9	1	6	Rafał Ostrowski	Poland	0.207	51.01		4
10	2	3	Héni Kechi	France	0.157	51.20		3
11	1	2	Vadzim Kebets	Belarus	0.224	51.89		2
12	1	3	Thomas Nikitin	Sweden	0.181	52.23	SB	1

=== 4 × 100 metres relay ===
Rank	Heat	Lane	Name	Nationality	Time	Note	Points
1	2	5	Christian Malcolm, Craig Pickering, James Ellington, Harry Aikines-Aryeetey	Great Britain	38.60	CR, EL	12
2	2	7	Teddy Tinmar, Christophe Lemaitre, Pierre-Alexis Pessonneaux, Ronald Pognon	France	38.71		11
3	2	4	Alex Schaf, Marius Broening, Tobias Unger, Alex-Platini Menga	Germany	38.92		10
4	1	4	Olaf Paruzel, Dariusz Kuć, Robert Kubaczyk, Kamil Kryński	Poland	39.09		9
5	2	6	Aleksandr Brednev, Konstantin Petryashov, Roman Smirnov, Aleksandr Khyutte	Russia	39.09		8
6	1	5	Ricardo Pacheco, Francis Obikwelu, Arnaldo Abrantes, Yazaldes Nascimento	Portugal	39.43		7
7	1	6	Jan Veleba, Jirí Vojtík, Vojtech Šulc, Lukáš Milo	Czech Republic	39.77		6
8	1	7	Eduard Viles, Ángel David Rodríguez, Edgar Pérez, Eusebio Cáceres	Spain	39.85		5
9	1	2	Oskar Lberg, Stefan Tärnhuvud, Benjamin Olsson, Nil de Oliveira	Sweden	39.94		4
10	2	2	Ruslan Perestyuk, Vitaliy Korzh, Serhiy Sahutkin, Yuriy Shtanov	Ukraine	40.23		3
11	1	3	Yury Melnikau, Viktar Rabau, Mikalai Homan, Ivan Trafimovich	Belarus	41.12		2
	2	3	Jacques Riparelli, Simone Collio, Emanuele di Gregorio, Fabio Cerutti	Italy	DQ		0

=== 4 × 400 metres relay ===
Rank	Heat	Name	Nationality	Time	Notes	Points
1	2	Maksim Dyldin, Dmitry Buryak, Pavel Trenikhin, Denis Alekseyev	Russia	3:02.42	EL	12
2	2	Nicolas Fillon, Teddy Venel, Mamoudou Hanne, Mame-Ibra Anne	France	3:03.33	SB	11
3	2	David Gollnow, Jonas Plass, Benjamin Jonas, Thomas Schneider	Germany	3:04.10	SB	10
4	2	Piotr Wiaderek, Marcin Marciniszyn, Kamil Budziejewski, Mateusz Fórmański	Poland	3:04.42	SB	9
5	1	Isalbet Juarez, Luca Galletti, Matteo Galvan, Marco Vistalli	Italy	3:05.66	SB	8
6	2	Ievgen Gutsol, Stanislav Melnykov, Myhaylo Knysh, Volodymyr Burakov	Ukraine	3:05.93	SB	7
7	1	Pavel Jirán, Pavel Maslák, Tomáš Bošek, Josef Prorok	Czech Republic	3:06.76	SB	6
8	1	Roberto Iones, Mark Ujakpor, Javier Sanz, Ramón Montejano	Spain	3:07.37	SB	5
9	1	Mattias Claesson, Fredrik Johansson, Johan Wissman, Joni Jaako	Sweden	3:07.88	SB	4
10	1	Yazaldes Nascimento, João Ferreira, Carlos Pinheiro, Jorge Paula	Portugal	3:10.24	SB	3
	1	Anis Ananenka, Dzmitry Paluyan, Maksim Piskunou, Aliaksandr Bazulka	Belarus	DQ		0
	2	Andrew Steele, Conrad Williams, Michael Bingham, Richard Buck	Great Britain	DQ		0

=== High jump ===
Rank	Name	Nationality	2.05	2.10	2.15	2.20	2.24	2.28	2.31	2.33	2.35	2.37	2.39	Mark	Note	Points
1	Dmytro Demyanyuk	Ukraine	-	-	o	xo	o	o	o	o	o	-	xx	2.35	=WL, CR, =EL	12
2	Aleksey Dmitrik	Russia	-	o	o	o	o	xo	o	x-	x-	x		2.31		11
3	Jaroslav Bába	Czech Republic	-	-	o	o	xo	xxo	x					2.28		9.5
3	Raul Spank	Germany	-	-	o	xo	o	xxo	x					2.28		9.5
5	Abdoulaye Diarra	France	-	o	o	o	xo	xxx						2.24	=PB	8
6	Silvano Chesani	Italy	-	o	o	xo	xo	xx						2.24		7
7	Javier Bermejo	Spain	-	o	o	o	xxo	xx						2.24	SB	6
8	Samson Oni	Great Britain	-	o	o	o	xxx							2.20		5
9	Artsiom Zaitsau	Belarus	-	-	o	xo	xxx							2.20		4
10	Mehdi Alkhatib	Sweden	-	o	o	xxo	xx							2.20		3
11	Wojciech Theiner	Poland	-	xo	o	xxo	x							2.20		2
12	Paulo Gonçalves	Portugal	xo	xo	xx									2.10		1

=== Pole vault ===
Rank	Name	Nationality	5.00	5.20	5.40	5.50	5.60	5.66	5.72	5.78	5.84	Mark	Notes	Points
1	Maksym Mazuryk	Ukraine	–	–	o	o	xo	o	o	–	xx–	5.72	=iSB	12
2	Malte Mohr	Germany	–	–	–	o	–	–	xo	–	xxx	5.72		11
3	Aleksandr Gripich	Russia	–	o	o	xo	o	x–	xx			5.60	=iSB	10
4	Łukasz Michalski	Poland	–	o	o	–	xxo	–	xx			5.60	iSB	9
5	Renaud Lavillenie	France	–	–	–	o	–	–	xxx			5.50		8
6	Jan Kudlička	Czech Republic	–	o	–	xo	xxx					5.50		7
7	Steven Lewis	Great Britain	–	xxo	o	–	xx					5.40		6
8	Stanislau Tsivonchyk	Belarus	o	o	xo	xxx						5.40	=iPB	5
9	Edi Maia	Portugal	o	o	xxx							5.20		3.5
9	Albert Vélez	Spain	o	o	xxx							5.20		3.5
11	Alhaji Jeng	Sweden	–	xxo	xx							5.20		2
	Giuseppe Gibilisco	Italy	–	xxx								NM		0

=== Long jump ===
Rank	Name	Nationality	#1	#2	#3	#4	Mark	Notes	Points
1	Aleksandr Menkov	Russia	x	8.13	8.20	8.14	8.20	CR	12
2	Michel Tornéus	Sweden	7.80	8.19	8.10	x	8.19	PB	11
3	Chris Tomlinson	Great Britain	8.02	8.12	8.04	7.91	8.12	SB	10
4	Christian Reif	Germany	7.94	8.10	x	x	8.10		9
5	Luis Felipe Méliz	Spain	7.73	7.72	7.94		7.94		8
6	Kafétien Gomis	France	7.08	7.78	7.91		7.91		7
7	Marcos Chuva	Portugal	7.90	7.84	6.56		7.90	SB	6
8	Roman Novotný	Czech Republic	7.21	7.49	7.72		7.72		5
9	Sheryf El-Sheryf	Ukraine	7.68	x	7.39		7.68		4
10	Emanuele Formichetti	Italy	7.52	7.45	7.36		7.52		3
11	Konrad Podgórski	Poland	x	7.01	7.42		7.42		2
12	Aliaksei Pastupaila	Belarus	7.07	7.39	5.50		7.39		1

=== Triple jump ===
Rank	Name	Nationality	#1	#2	#3	#4	Mark	Notes	Points
1	Fabrizio Schembri	Italy	16.71	16.53	16.66	16.95w	16.95w		12
2	Dzmitry Platnitski	Belarus	16.81w	X	X	X	16.81w		11
3	Viktor Kuznyetsov	Ukraine	16.47	16.76	16.79w	16.68	16.79w		10
4	Karol Hoffmann	Poland	16.32w	X	16.78w	–	16.78w		9
5	Karl Taillepierre	France	16.63	X	16.40w		16.63		8
6	Nelson Évora	Portugal	16.28w	X	16.33		16.33		7
7	Andreas Pohle	Germany	16.24	16.29	13.85		16.29	SB	6
8	José Emilio Bellido	Spain	X	15.95	X		15.95		5
9	Mathias Ström	Sweden	X	X	15.52w		15.52w		4
10	Kola Adedoyin	Great Britain	15.12	15.02	15.32w		15.32w		3
11	Petr Hnízdil	Czech Republic	14.97	14.13w	15.32w		15.32w		2
	Aleksey Fyodorov	Russia	X	X	X		NM		0

=== Shot put ===
Rank	Name	Nationality	#1	#2	#3	#4	Mark	Note	Points
1	David Storl	Germany	19.95	x	20.51	20.81	20.81	=CR	12
2	Tomasz Majewski	Poland	19.90	x	20.51	20.18	20.51		11
~~3~~	Andrei Mikhnevich	Belarus	~~20.22~~	~~x~~	~~20.09~~	~~20.40~~	~~20.40~~	DQ (doping)	0
3	Ivan Yushkov	Russia	19.09	19.49	19.28	x	19.49		10
4	Marco Fortes	Portugal	x	19.26	19.40		19.40		9
5	Andriy Semenov	Ukraine	19.38	x	19.08		19.38		8
6	Gaëtan Bucki	France	18.79	18.93	x		18.93		7
7	Borja Vivas	Spain	18.45	18.64	x		18.64		6
8	Jan Marcell	Czech Republic	18.49	18.34	x		18.49		5
9	Niklas Arrhenius	Sweden	17.03	17.87	x		17.87		4
10	Marco di Maggio	Italy	17.51	x	x		17.51		3
11	Greg Beard	Great Britain	16.33	16.97	16.75		16.97		2

=== Discus throw ===
Rank	Name	Nationality	#1	#2	#3	#4	Mark	Notes	Points
1	Robert Harting	Germany	64.42	65.50	65.63	65.46	65.63		12
2	Frank Casañas	Spain	56.90	61.41	62.43	61.48	62.43		11
3	Piotr Małachowski	Poland	61.41	X	60.91	61.66	61.66		10
4	Jan Marcell	Czech Republic	59.89	X	61.46	58.85	61.46		9
5	Bogdan Pishchalnikov	Russia	56.25	58.35	59.89		59.89		8
6	Brett Morse	Great Britain	X	59.37	X		59.37		7
7	Niklas Arrhenius	Sweden	57.75	X	X		57.75		6
8	Oleksiy Semenov	Ukraine	55.18	56.09	56.30		56.30		5
9	Giovanni Faloci	Italy	X	56.09	X		56.09		4
10	Jean-François Aurokiom	France	52.85	X	49.21		52.85		3
11	Jorge Grave	Portugal	50.59	48.25	X		50.59		2
12	Siarhei Rohanau	Belarus	X	49.23	X		49.23		1

=== Hammer throw ===
Rank	Name	Nationality	#1	#2	#3	#4	Mark	Note	Points
1	Markus Esser	Germany	76.95	75.06	79.28	76.37	79.28	CR	12
2	Paweł Fajdek	Poland	76.73	76.76	76.98	x	76.98	PB	11
3	Oleksiy Sokyrskyy	Ukraine	x	76.96	75.29	x	76.96	PB	10
4	Pavel Kryvitski	Belarus	x	74.92	76.93	x	76.93		9
5	Nicola Vizzoni	Italy	x	74.47	72.82		74.47		8
6	Frédéric Pouzy	France	67.81	73.88	x		73.88		7
7	Aleksey Zagorniy	Russia	x	x	73.85		73.85		6
8	Javier Cienfuegos	Spain	72.11	71.59	x		72.11		5
9	Lukás Melich	Czech Republic	x	68.92	70.86		70.86		4
10	Mattias Jons	Sweden	65.75	69.27	69.53		69.53		3
11	Andy Frost	Great Britain	x	61.53	x		61.53		2
	Dário Manso	Portugal	x	x	x		NM		0

=== Javelin throw ===
Rank	Name	Nationality	#1	#2	#3	#4	Mark	Notes	Points
~~1~~	Dmytro Kosynskyy	Ukraine	~~80.28~~	~~81.29~~	~~x~~	~~80.75~~	~~81.29~~	DQ (doping)	0
1	Sergey Makarov	Russia	80.43	81.20	80.23	79.74	81.20		12
2	Gabriel Wallin	Sweden	80.88	74.36	80.24	80.12	80.88	PB	11
3	Matthias de Zordo	Germany	77.13	77.86	x	74.52	77.86		10
4	Petr Frydrych	Czech Republic	74.42	x	x		74.42		9
5	Rafael Baraza	Spain	70.30	74.11	71.16		74.11	SB	8
6	Roberto Bertolini	Italy	70.89	70.82	72.07		72.07	SB	7
7	Paweł Rakoczy	Poland	70.95	71.79	x		71.79		6
8	James Campbell	Great Britain	68.03	x	x		68.03		5
9	Anatoli Adakhouski	Belarus	65.47	64.31	64.64		65.47		4
10	Killian Durechou	France	61.77	63.21	60.24		63.21		3
11	Tiago Aperta	Portugal	59.54	62.36	62.54		62.54		2

== Women ==
=== 100 metres ===
Wind:
Heat 1: −0.5 m/s
Heat 2: +1.5 m/s

Rank	Heat	Lane	Name	Nationality	React	Time	Notes	Points
1	1	6	Véronique Mang	France	0.154	11.23	CR	12
2	2	4	Olesya Povh	Ukraine	0.152	11.28		11
3	2	6	Aleksandra Fedoriva	Russia	0.203	11.34		10
4	2	3	Marion Wagner	Germany	0.197	11.38		9
5	2	5	Anyika Onuora	Great Britain	0.171	11.43		8
6	2	7	Kateřina Čechová	Czech Republic	0.180	11.45		7
7	1	5	Sónia Tavares	Portugal	0.171	11.51		6
8	1	7	Yulia Nestsiarenka	Belarus	0.183	11.53	SB	5
9	2	2	Marta Jeschke	Poland	0.216	11.55		4
10	1	3	Audrey Alloh	Italy	0.167	11.63	SB	3
11	1	2	Lena Berntsson	Sweden	0.174	11.80		2
12	1	4	Amparo María Cotán	Spain	0.181	11.82		1

=== 200 metres ===
Rank	Heat	Lane	Name	Nationality	Time	Note	Points
1	2	5	Mariya Ryemyen	Ukraine	23.10		12
2	2	4	Yuliya Chermoshanskaya	Russia	23.40		11
3	1	5	Cathleen Tschirch	Germany	23.45	SB	10
4	2	7	Myriam Soumaré	France	23.62		9
5	2	6	Denisa Rosolová	Czech Republic	23.66		8
6	2	2	Abi Oyepitan	Great Britain	23.91		7
7	1	3	Sónia Tavares	Portugal	23.94		6
8	2	3	Marika Popowicz	Poland	24.03		5
9	1	2	Moa Hjelmer	Sweden	24.05		4
10	1	6	Giulia Arcioni	Italy	24.10		3
11	1	7	Belén Rocio	Spain	24.59		2
12	1	4	Katsiaryna Hanchar	Belarus	24.75		1

=== 400 metres ===
Rank	Heat	Lane	Name	Nationality	React	Time	Note	Points
1	2	6	Antonina Yefremova	Ukraine		51.02	CR	12
2	2	4	Denisa Rosolová	Czech Republic	0.205	51.37		11
3	2	7	Shana Cox	Great Britain	0.205	51.49		10
4	2	5	Sviatlana Usovich	Belarus	0.282	51.85		9
5	2	3	Kseniya Zadorina	Russia	0.186	52.00		8
6	1	4	Janin Lindenberg	Germany	0.262	52.07		7
7	2	2	Muriel Hurtis-Houairi	France	0.189	52.19		6
8	1	5	Marta Milani	Italy	0.193	52.64		5
9	1	6	Agata Bednarek	Poland	0.172	52.93	PB	4
10	1	7	Aauri Bokesa	Spain	0.252	53.60	PB	3
11	1	3	Josefin Magnusson	Sweden	0.196	53.78	=PB	2
12	1	2	Cátia Nunes	Portugal	0.253	55.02	PB	1

=== 800 metres ===
Rank	Name	Nationality	Time	Note	Points
~~1~~	Mariya Savinova	Russia	~~1:58.75~~	DQ (doping)	0
1	Jennifer Meadows	Great Britain	1:59.47		12
2	Liliya Lobanova	Ukraine	2:00.18		11
3	Maryna Arzamasava	Belarus	2:00.62		10
4	Elisa Cusma Piccione	Italy	2:01.04		9
5	Jana Hartmann	Germany	2:01.15		8
6	Angelika Cichocka	Poland	2:01.75		7
7	Clarisse Moh	France	2:03.38		6
8	Isabel Macías	Spain	2:03.49	PB	5
9	Sofia Öberg	Sweden	2:04.53	SB	4
10	Sandra Teixeira	Portugal	2:07.94		3
11	Lenka Masná	Czech Republic	2:08.43		2

=== 1500 metres ===
Rank	Name	Nationality	Time	Notes	Points
1	Charlene Thomas	Great Britain	4:06.85	SB	12
~~2~~	Yekaterina Martynova	Russia	~~4:07.08~~	~~SB~~, DQ (doping)	0
2	Anna Mishchenko	Ukraine	4:07.27		11
~~4~~	Natallia Kareiva	Belarus	~~4:07.76~~	~~SB~~, DQ (doping)	0
3	Nuria Fernández	Spain	4:07.82		10
4	Sylwia Ejdys	Poland	4:09.75		9
5	Tereza Čapková	Czech Republic	4:10.74	PB	8
6	Denise Krebs	Germany	4:11.96		7
7	Sara Moreira	Portugal	4:12.63		6
8	Viktoria Tegenfeldt	Sweden	4:16.01		5
9	Valentina Costanza	Italy	4:25.35		4
10	Fanjanteino Félix	France	4:30.75		3

=== 3000 metres ===
Rank	Name	Nationality	Time	Note	Points
~~1~~	Olesya Syreva	Russia	~~8:53.20~~	~~EL~~	0
1	Nataliya Tobias	Ukraine	8:54.16	SB	12
2	Natalia Rodríguez	Spain	8:55.09	SB	11
3	Lidia Chojecka	Poland	8:55.73	SB	10
4	Silvia Weissteiner	Italy	8:58.10	SB	9
5	Sviatlana Kudzelich	Belarus	9:00.06	SB	8
6	Stevie Stockton	Great Britain	9:00.67	SB	7
7	Corinna Harrer	Germany	9:01.29	SB	6
8	Christelle Daunay	France	9:02.16	PB	5
9	Dulce Félix	Portugal	9:09.92	SB	4
10	Lucie Sekanová	Czech Republic	9:19.83	SB	3
11	Charlotta Fougberg	Sweden	9:24.86	SB	2

=== 5000 metres ===
Rank	Name	Nationality	Time	Notes	Points
1	Dolores Checa	Spain	15:16.89		12
2	Yelena Zadorozhnaya	Russia	15:28.65		11
3	Helen Clitheroe	Great Britain	15:33.03		10
4	Sabrina Mockenhaupt	Germany	15:35.02	PB	9
5	Dulce Félix	Portugal	15:36.99		8
6	Tetyana Holovchenko	Ukraine	15:46.02	SB	7
7	Anna Incerti	Italy	15:49.54		6
8	Christine Bardelle	France	15:57.56		5
9	Wioletta Frankiewicz	Poland	16:22.81		4
10	Malin Liljestedt	Sweden	16:28.40	SB	3
11	Kvetoslava Pecková	Czech Republic	16:31.74	PB	2
12	Volha Dubouskaya	Belarus	16:40.44		1

=== 3000 metres steeplechase ===
Rank	Name	Nationality	Time	Note	Points
1	Gulnara Galkina	Russia	9:31.20		12
2	Sara Moreira	Portugal	9:35.11		11
3	Jana Sussmann	Germany	9:43.28	PB	10
4	Marcela Lustigová	Czech Republic	9:43.57		9
5	Diana Martín	Spain	9:46.89	SB	8
6	Sophie Duarte	France	9:48.83		7
7	Giulia Martinelli	Italy	9:52.78		6
8	Valeriya Mara	Ukraine	9:54.10	SB	5
9	Eilish McColgan	Great Britain	9:55.13	PB	4
10	Matylda Szlęzak	Poland	9:57.38	PB	3
11	Iryna Ananenka	Belarus	10:18.32		2
12	Klara Bodinson	Sweden	10:25.55		1

=== 100 metres hurdles ===
Rank	Heat	Name	Nationality	React	Time	Motes	Points
1	1	Tatyana Dektyareva	Russia	0.201	13.16	SB	12
2	2	Alina Talay	Belarus	0.216	13.19		11
3	1	Marzia Caravelli	Italy	0.166	13.21		10
4	2	Tiffany Porter	Great Britain	0.185	13.28		9
5	2	Sandra Gomis	France	0.209	13.32		8
6	2	Cindy Roleder	Germany	0.233	13.40		7
7	2	Lucie Škrobáková	Czech Republic	0.288	13.45		6
8	1	Karolina Tymińska	Poland	0.180	13.51		5
9	1	Olena Yanovska	Ukraine	0.165	13.56		4
10	2	Josephine Onyia	Spain	0.309	13.60		3
11	1	Emma Tuvesson	Sweden	0.195	13.62		2
12	1	Patrícia Mamona	Portugal	0.196	14.30		1

=== 400 metres hurdles ===
Rank	Heat	Lane	Name	Nationality	React	Time	Note	Points
1	2	4	Zuzana Hejnová	Czech Republic	0.175	53.87	CR, NR	12
2	2	3	Natalya Antyukh	Russia	0.190	54.52	SB	11
3	2	5	Perri Shakes-Drayton	Great Britain	0.225	55.06		10
4	2	6	Hanna Titimets	Ukraine	0.243	55.09		9
5	1	3	Manuela Gentili	Italy	0.248	56.85	SB	8
6	1	5	Vera Barbosa	Portugal		57.26	PB	7
7	1	2	Phara Anarchasis	France	0.233	57.26	SB	6
8	1	4	Christiane Klopsch	Germany	0.316	57.85		5
9	2	2	Joanna Linkiewicz	Poland	0.311	58.39		4
10	1	7	Maryna Boika	Belarus	0.279	59.43		3
11	2	7	Sofie Persson	Sweden	0.211	1:00.34		2
12	1	6	Olga Ortega	Spain	0.393	1:00.82		1

=== 4 × 100 metres relay ===
Rank	Heat	Name	Nationality	Time	Notes	Points
1	2	Olesya Povh, Nataliya Pohrebnyak, Mariya Ryemyen, Hrystyna Stuy	Ukraine	42.85	CR, EL	12
2	2	Yekaterina Voronenkova, Aleksandra Fedoriva, Yuliya Gushchina, Yuliya Chermoshanskaya	Russia	43.12	SB	11
3	2	Johanna Kedzierski, Marion Wagner, Cathleen Tschirch, Leena Gŭnther	Germany	43.37		10
4	2	Jeanette Kwakye, Anyika Onuora, Laura Turner, Abi Oyepitan	Great Britain	43.50	SB	9
5	2	Myriam Soumaré, Céline Distel, Lina Jacques-Sébastien, Véronique Mang	France	43.61	SB	8
6	1	Yulia Nestsiarenka, Alina Talay, Elena Danilyuk-Nevmerzhytskaya, Yuliya Balykina	Belarus	43.67	SB	7
7	1	Ewelina Ptak, Marika Popowicz, Marta Jeschke, Anna Kiełbasińska	Poland	43.77	SB	6
8	1	Lena Berntsson, Carolina Klüft, Elin Backman, Moa Hjelmer	Sweden	44.28	SB	5
9	1	Iveta Mazáčová, Pavlína Humpolíková, Monika Táborská, Kateřina Čechová	Czech Republic	44.40	SB	4
10	2	Tiziana Grasso, Maria Aurora Salvagno, Giulia Arcioni, Audrey Alloh	Italy	44.55	SB	3
11	1	Josephine Onyia, Belén Recio, Estela García, Amparo María Cotán	Spain	44.59	SB	2
12	1	Andreia Felisberto, Carla Tavares, Sónia Tavares, Naide Gomes	Portugal	44.72	SB	1

=== 4 × 400 metres relay ===
Rank	Heat	Name	Nationality	Time	Notes	Points
1	2	Kseniya Vdovina, Kseniya Zadorina, Tatyana Firova, Lyudmila Litvinova	Russia	3:27.17	EL	12
2	2	Kelly Massey, Nicola Sanders, Lee McConnell, Perri Shakes-Drayton	Great Britain	3:27.27	SB	11
3	2	Kseniya Karandyuk, Alina Lohvynenko, Yuliya Baraley, Antonina Yefremova	Ukraine	3:28.13	SB	10
4	2	Janin Lindenberg, Esther Cremer, Lena Schmidt, Claudia Hoffmann	Germany	3:28.89	SB	9
5	1	Denisa Rosolová, Zuzana Bergrová, Jitka Bartoničková, Zuzana Hejnová	Czech Republic	3:29.95	SB	8
6	1	Chiara Bazzoni, Maria Enrica Spacca, Libania Grenot, Marta Milani	Italy	3:30.11	SB	7
7	1	Yulianna Yuschanka, Hanna Tashpulatava, Iryna Khliustava, Sviatlana Usovich	Belarus	3:30.44	SB	6
8	2	Marie Gayot, Muriel Hurtis-Houairi, Marie-Angélique Lacordelle, Phara Anacharsis	France	3:31.13	SB	5
9	1	Iga Baumgart, Patrycja Wyciszkiewicz, Joanna Linkiewicz, Agata Bednarek	Poland	3:35.65	SB	4
10	1	Josefin Magnusson, Sofie Persson, Moa Hjelmer, Rebecca Högberg	Sweden	3:36.47	SB	3
11	1	Aauri Bokesa, Natalia Rodríguez, Begoña Garrido, Estela García	Spain	3:37.66	SB	2
12	2	Carla Tavares, Patrícia Lopes, Cátia Nunes, Vera Barbosa	Portugal	3:40.57		1

=== High jump ===
Rank	Name	Nationality	1.65	1.70	1.75	1.80	1.85	1.89	1.92	Mark	Notes	Points
1	Emma Green	Sweden	–	–	–	o	o	o	xxx	1.89		12
2	Viktoriya Styopina	Ukraine	–	–	o	o	xo	o	xxx	1.89		11
3	Ruth Beitia	Spain	–	–	–	o	o	xo	xxx	1.89		10
4	Irina Gordeyeva	Russia	–	–	o	o	xo	xo	xxx	1.89		9
5	Mélanie Melfort	France	–	–	–	o	o	xxx		1.85		8
6	Valeryia Bahdanovich	Belarus	–	o	xo	o	o	xxx		1.85		7
7	Karolina Błażej	Poland	–	o	xo	o	xxx			1.80		6
8	Raffaella Lamera	Italy	–	o	o	xo	xxx			1.80		4.5
8	Oldřiška Marešová	Czech Republic	–	o	o	xo	xxx			1.80		4.5
10	Marie-Laurence Jungfleisch	Germany	–	o	xo	xo	xxx			1.80		3
11	Emma Perkins	Great Britain	o	xo	o	xxx				1.75		2
12	Marisa Anselmo	Portugal	o	o	xxx					1.70		1

=== Pole vault ===
Rank	Name	Nationality	3.80	4.00	4.15	4.25	4.35	4.40	4.45	4.50	4.55	4.60	4.65	4.70	4.75	4.80	4.86	Mark	Notes	Points
1	Anna Rogowska	Poland	-	-	-	-	-	xo	-	-	o	-	x-	o	o	-	xxx	4.75	WL, CR	12
2	Silke Spiegelburg	Germany	-	-	-	-	o	-	o	-	o	-	o	x-	xo	xx		4.75	=WL, =CR	11
3	Jiřina Ptáčníková	Czech Republic	-	-	-	o	-	o	-	xo	o	xxo	x					4.60	SB	10
4	Aleksandra Kiryashova	Russia	-	-	-	o	-	o	-	o	x-	xx						4.50		9
5	Holly Bleasdale	Great Britain	-	-	-	o	-	o	-	xxx								4.40		8
6	Maria Eleonor Tavares	Portugal	-	o	o	o	xo	xo	xx									4.40	NR	7
7	Anastasiya Shvedova	Belarus	-	-	-	o	xxx											4.25		6
8	Télie Mathiot	France	xo	o	o	xo	xxx											4.25		5
9	Anna María Pinero	Spain	-	o	o	xxo	xx											4.25		3.5
9	Elena Scarpellini	Italy	-	o	o	xxo	xx											4.25		3.5
11	Hanna Sheleh	Ukraine	-	o	xxx													4.00		2
	Malin Dahlström	Sweden	-	xxx														NM		0

=== Long jump ===
Rank	Name	Nationality	#1	#2	#3	#4	Mark	Notes	Points
1	Darya Klishina	Russia	6.40	6.74	6.57	X	6.74		12
2	Carolina Klüft	Sweden	6.73	X	6.40	X	6.73	SB	11
3	Éloyse Lesueur	France	5.24	X	6.60w	5.12w	6.60w		10
4	Naide Gomes	Portugal	6.58	X	X	4.81	6.58		9
5	Veranika Shutkova	Belarus	6.47w	6.53w	6.45		6.53w		8
6	Bianca Kappler	Germany	5.98	6.50w	X		6.50w		7
7	Concepción Montaner	Spain	X	6.44w	6.20w		6.44w		6
8	Teresa Dobija	Poland	6.01w	6.41	6.40w		6.41		5
9	Shara Proctor	Great Britain	6.28	6.31w	6.28		6.31w		4
10	Tania Vicenzino	Italy	6.23w	6.21w	5.77		6.23w		3
11	Inna Ahkozova	Ukraine	6.06	6.18w	5.94		6.18w		2
12	Jana Korešová	Czech Republic	5.76w	5.99w	5.59		5.99w		1

=== Triple jump ===
Rank	Name	Nationality	#1	#2	#3	#4	Mark	Note	Points
1	Olha Saladuha	Ukraine	14.51	14.85	14.44	14.53	14.85	CR	12
2	Simona La Mantia	Italy	14.12	14.29	14.09	x	14.29		11
3	Patricia Sarrapio	Spain	14.10	13.89	13.69	x	14.10	=PB	10
4	Natalya Kutyakova	Russia	13.72	14.07	14.02	13.97	14.07		9
5	Małgorzata Trybańska	Poland	13.46	13.66	13.98		13.98		8
6	Katja Demut	Germany	x	x	13.81		13.81		7
7	Natallia Viatkina	Belarus	x	13.73	13.68		13.73		6
8	Patrícia Mamona	Portugal	13.55	x	x		13.55		5
9	Yasmine Regis	Great Britain	12.23	13.22	13.27		13.27		4
10	Lucie Májková	Czech Republic	12.61	12.79	12.99		12.99		3
11	Kristin Franke-Björkman	Sweden	12.75	12.99	12.55		12.99		2
	Nathalie Marie-Nelly	France	x	x	x		NM		0

=== Shot put ===
Rank	Name	Nationality	#1	#2	#3	#4	Mark	Notes	Points
1	Nadine Kleinert	Germany	16.35	17.28	17.81	–	17.81		12
2	Anna Avdeyeva	Russia	16.65	17.33	X	17.26	17.33		11
3	Chiara Rosa	Italy	16.21	17.18	17.04	17.14	17.18		10
4	Yanina Pravalinskay-Karolchyk	Belarus	16.18	X	16.48	16.19	16.48		9
5	Jessica Cérival	France	16.05	16.13	16.04		16.13		8
6	Paulina Guba	Poland	15.86	16.08	15.31		16.08		7
7	Helena Engman	Sweden	X	15.85	15.46		15.85		6
8	Úrsula Ruiz	Spain	15.54	15.72	15.30		15.72		5
9	Olha Holodna	Ukraine	15.60	15.51	X		15.60		4
10	Rebecca Peake	Great Britain	15.06	14.54	15.03		15.06		3
11	Maria Antónia Borges	Portugal	14.35	14.41	14.44		14.44		2
12	Barbora Špotáková	Czech Republic	12.64	X	X		12.64		1

=== Discus throw ===
Rank	Name	Nationality	#1	#2	#3	#4	Mark	Notes	Points
1	Kateryna Karsak	Ukraine	56.66	X	60.07	63.35	63.35		12
2	Darya Pishchalnikova	Russia	53.47	60.11	58.74	61.09	61.09		11
3	Żaneta Glanc	Poland	53.71	58.43	X	59.29	59.29		10
4	Nadine Müller	Germany	56.29	X	57.78	57.30	57.78		9
5	Mélina Robert-Michon	France	57.36	X	54.71		57.36		8
6	Vera Cechlová	Czech Republic	56.13	55.31	X		56.13		7
7	Laura Bordignon	Italy	X	54.05	52.48		54.05		6
8	Jade Nicholls	Great Britain	X	53.85	X		53.85		5
9	Sviatlana Siarova	Belarus	44.16	46.37	52.11		52.11		4
10	Irina Rodrigues	Portugal	46.58	49.97	49.47		49.97		3
11	Mercedes de Sántalo-Ossorio	Spain	49.50	X	48.27		49.50		2
12	Sandra Andersson	Sweden	45.33	45.07	45.08		45.33		1

=== Hammer throw ===
Rank	Name	Nationality	#1	#2	#3	#4	Mark	Notes	Points
1	Betty Heidler	Germany	73.01	73.43	72.87	73.19	73.43		12
2	Tatyana Lysenko	Russia	71.44	70.76	71.18	x	71.44		11
3	Katerina Safránková	Czech Republic	67.11	69.39	x	68.37	69.39	PB	10
4	Alena Matoshka	Belarus	66.52	67.63	69.31	69.12	69.31		9
5	Stéphanie Falzon	France	68.63	x	67.41		68.63		8
6	Vânia Silva	Portugal	63.55	66.48	68.35		68.35		7
7	Berta Castells	Spain	61.99	67.35	x		67.35	SB	6
8	Silvia Salis	Italy	66.55	x	65.72		66.55		5
9	Sophie Hitchon	Great Britain	63.53	x	66.05		66.05		4
10	Iryna Sekachyova	Ukraine	61.79	x	64.02		64.02		3
11	Tracey Andersson	Sweden	62.75	x	63.04		63.04		2
12	Joanna Fiodorow	Poland	x	62.19	x		62.19		1

=== Javelin throw ===
Rank	Name	Nationality	#1	#2	#3	#4	Mark	Note	Points
1	Christina Obergföll	Germany	66.22	61.07	x	62.32	66.22	WL	12
2	Goldie Sayers	Great Britain	64.31	x	x	64.46	64.46	SB	11
3	Barbora Špotáková	Czech Republic	58.09	61.98	61.20	64.40	64.40		10
4	Mariya Abakumova	Russia	59.71	64.21'	60.41	x	64.21		9
5	Mercedes Chilla	Spain	58.71	x	x		58.71		8
6	Zahra Bani	Italy	54.77	55.92	55.45		55.92		7
7	Vira Rebryk	Ukraine	x	55.16	x		55.16		6
8	Sílvia Cruz	Portugal	53.69	54.93	55.12		55.12		5
9	Annika Petersson	Sweden	52.85	53.63	50.87		53.63		4
10	Maryna Novik	Belarus	52.18	53.41	51.00		53.41		3
11	Romina Ugatai	France	52.61	52.41	51.25		52.61		2
12	Magdalena Czenska	Poland	47.55	50.98	x		50.98		1

== Score table ==
Event		BLR	CZE	FRA	GER	GBR	ITA	POL	POR	RUS	ESP	SWE	UKR
100 metres	M	4	1	12	5	11	8	9	10	6	7	2	3
100 metres	W	5	7	12	9	8	3	4	6	10	1	2	11
200 metres	M	10	9	12	2	7	8	11	3	5	4	6	1
200 metres	W	1	8	9	10	7	3	5	6	11	2	3	12
400 metres	M	3	1	8	11	6	10	9	2	12	5	7	4
400 metres	W	9	11	6	7	10	5	4	1	8	3	2	12
800 metres	M	8	1	11	5	10	9	12	2	4	3	6	7
800 metres	W	10	2	6	8	12	9	7	3	0	5	4	11
1500 metres	M	2	7	5	9	10	4	8	1	11	12	3	6
1500 metres	W	0	8	3	7	12	4	9	6	0	5	10	11
3000 metres	M	5	2	8	4	9	6	1	10	11	12	3	7
3000 metres	W	8	3	5	6	7	9	10	4	0	11	2	12
5000 metres	M	8	2	6	3	10	5	7	4	9	12	1	11
5000 metres	W	1	2	5	9	10	6	4	8	11	12	3	7
3000 metre steeplechase	M	4	2	12	11	5	8	7	6	0	9	3	10
3000 metre steeplechase	W	3	10	8	0	5	7	4	11	12	9	2	6
110/100 metre hurdles	M	6.5	3	11	4	12	5	9	2	6.5	10	8	1
110/100 metre hurdles	W	11	6	8	7	9	10	5	1	12	3	2	4
400 metre hurdles	M	2	7	3	11	12	6	4	9	10	5	1	8
400 metre hurdles	W	3	12	6	5	10	8	4	7	11	1	2	9
4 x 100 metres relay	M	3	6	11	10	12	0	9	7	8	5	4	0
4 x 100 metres relay	W	7	4	8	10	9	3	6	1	11	2	5	12
4 x 400 metres relay	M	2	1	11	10	4	8	9	3	12	6	5	7
4 x 400 metres relay	W	6	8	5	9	11	7	4	1	12	2	3	10
High jump	M	4	9.5	8	9.5	5	7	2	1	11	6	3	12
High jump	W	7	4.5	8	3	2	4.5	6	1	9	10	12	11
Pole vault	M	5	7	8	11	6	0	9	3.5	10	3.5	2	12
Pole vault	W	6	10	5	11	8	3.5	12	7	9	3.5	0	2
Long jump	M	1	5	7	9	10	3	2	6	12	8	11	4
Long jump	W	8	1	10	7	4	3	5	9	12	6	11	2
Triple jump	M	11	2	8	6	3	12	9	7	0	5	4	10
Triple jump	W	6	3	0	7	4	11	8	5	9	10	2	12
Shot put	M	10	5	7	12	2	3	0	9	10	6	4	8
Shot put	W	9	1	8	12	3	10	7	2	11	5	6	4
Discus throw	M	1	9	3	12	7	4	10	2	8	11	6	5
Discus throw	W	4	7	8	9	5	6	10	3	11	2	1	12
Hammer throw	M	9	4	7	12	2	8	11	0	6	5	3	10
Hammer throw	W	9	10	8	12	4	5	1	7	11	6	2	3
Javelin throw	M	4	9	3	10	5	7	6	2	12	8	11	0
Javelin throw	W	3	10	2	12	11	7	1	5	9	8	4	6
Country		BLR	CZE	FRA	GER	GBR	ITA	POL	POR	RUS	ESP	SWE	UKR
Total		203	223	290	336.5	293	243	269	182.5	353	251	164	296
