= 2010 European Athletics Championships – Men's 800 metres =

Men's 800 metres at the European Athletics Championships

The men's 800 metres at the 2010 European Athletics Championships was held at the Estadi Olímpic Lluís Companys on 28, 29 and 31 July.

== Medalists ==
Gold	Marcin Lewandowski; Poland (POL)
Silver	(United Kingdom) Michael Rimmer; Great Britain (GBR)
Bronze	Adam Kszczot; Poland (POL)

== Records ==
Standing records prior to the 2010 European Athletics Championships
World record	Wilson Kipketer (DEN)	1:41.11	Cologne, Germany	24 August 1997
European record	Wilson Kipketer (DEN)	1:41.11	Cologne, Germany	24 August 1997
Championship record	Olaf Beyer (GDR)	1:43.84	Prague, Czechoslovakia	31 August 1978
World Leading	David Rudisha (KEN)	1:41.51	Heusden-Zolder, Belgium	10 July 2010
European Leading	Marcin Lewandowski (POL)	1:44.30	Lausanne, Switzerland	8 July 2010

== Schedule ==
Date	Time	Round
28 July 2010	12:10	Round 1
29 July 2010	20:50	Semifinals
31 July 2010	19:35	Final

== Results ==
=== Round 1 ===
First 3 in each heat (Q) and 4 best performers (q) advance to the Semifinals.

==== Heat 1 ====
Rank	Lane	Name	Nationality	Time	Notes
1	5	Marcin Lewandowski	Poland	1:49.78	Q
2	2	Hamid Oualich	France	1:49.92	Q
3	4	David Bustos	Spain	1:50.01	Q
4	6	Cristian Vorovenci	Romania	1:50.05	q
5	7	Jozef Pelikán	Slovakia	1:51.29	
6	1	Jan van den Broeck	Belgium	1:51.79	
7	8	Mattias Claesson	Sweden	1:52.53	
8	3	Christophe Bestgen	Luxembourg	1:52.64	

==== Heat 2 ====
Rank	Lane	Name	Nationality	Time	Notes
1	8	Jakub Holuša	Czech Republic	1:47.94	Q
2	1	Kevin López	Spain	1:48.13	Q
3	5	Brice Etes	Monaco	1:48.54	Q
4	3	Anis Ananenka	Belarus	1:49.29	q
5	6	David McCarthy	Ireland	1:49.53	q
6	4	Mario Scapini	Italy	1:49.67	q
7	2	Mikko Lahtio	Finland	1:51.76	
	7	Robert Lathouwers	Netherlands	DQ	

==== Heat 3 ====
Rank	Lane	Name	Nationality	Time	Notes
1	3	Luis Alberto Marco	Spain	1:49.96	Q
2	6	Giordano Benedetti	Italy	1:50.00	Q
3	4	Adam Kszczot	Poland	1:50.08	Q
4	2	Tamás Kazi	Hungary	1:50.21	
5	5	Jozef Repčík	Slovakia	1:50.51	
6	7	Andreas Rapatz	Austria	1:51.55	
7	1	Vitalij Kozlov	Lithuania	1:52.18	
8	8	Anton Asplund	Sweden	1:55.23	

==== Heat 4 ====
Rank	Lane	Name	Nationality	Time	Notes
1	8	Michael Rimmer	Great Britain & N.I.	1:49.99	Q
2	7	Arnoud Okken	Netherlands	1:50.13	Q
3	5	Lukas Rifesser	Italy	1:50.40	Q
4	6	Yuriy Koldin	Russia	1:50.64	
5	3	Joni Jaako	Sweden	1:50.93	
6	2	Dustin Emrani	Israel	1:51.51	
7	1	Andreas Bube	Denmark	1:51.91	
8	4	Andreas Smout	Belgium	1:52.04	

==== Summary ====
Rank	Heat	Lane	Name	Nationality	Time	Note
1	2	8	Jakub Holuša	Czech Republic	1:47.94	Q
2	2	1	Kevin López	Spain	1:48.13	Q
3	2	5	Brice Etes	Monaco	1:48.54	Q
4	2	3	Anis Ananenka	Belarus	1:49.29	q
5	2	6	David McCarthy	Ireland	1:49.53	q
6	2	4	Mario Scapini	Italy	1:49.67	q
7	1	5	Marcin Lewandowski	Poland	1:49.78	Q
8	1	2	Hamid Oualich	France	1:49.92	Q
9	3	3	Luis Alberto Marco	Spain	1:49.96	Q
10	4	8	Michael Rimmer	Great Britain & N.I.	1:49.99	Q
11	3	6	Giordano Benedetti	Italy	1:50.00	Q
12	1	4	David Bustos	Spain	1:50.01	Q
13	1	6	Cristian Vorovenci	Romania	1:50.05	q
14	3	4	Adam Kszczot	Poland	1:50.08	Q
15	4	7	Arnoud Okken	Netherlands	1:50.13	Q
16	3	2	Tamás Kazi	Hungary	1:50.21	
17	4	5	Lukas Rifesser	Italy	1:50.40	Q
18	3	5	Jozef Repčík	Slovakia	1:50.51	
19	4	6	Yuriy Koldin	Russia	1:50.64	
20	4	3	Joni Jaako	Sweden	1:50.93	
21	1	7	Jozef Pelikán	Slovakia	1:51.29	
22	4	2	Dustin Emrani	Israel	1:51.51	
23	3	7	Andreas Rapatz	Austria	1:51.55	
24	2	2	Mikko Lahtio	Finland	1:51.76	
25	1	1	Jan van den Broeck	Belgium	1:51.79	
26	4	1	Andreas Bube	Denmark	1:51.91	
27	4	4	Andreas Smout	Belgium	1:52.04	
28	3	1	Vitalij Kozlov	Lithuania	1:52.18	
29	1	8	Mattias Claesson	Sweden	1:52.53	
30	1	3	Christophe Bestgen	Luxembourg	1:52.64	
31	3	8	Anton Asplund	Sweden	1:55.23	
	2	7	Robert Lathouwers	Netherlands	DQ	

=== Semifinals ===
First 3 in each heat and 2 best performers advance to the Final.

==== Semifinal 1 ====
Rank	Lane	Name	Nationality	Time	Notes
1	4	Kevin López	Spain	1:48.11	Q
2	6	Marcin Lewandowski	Poland	1:48.15	Q
3	7	Arnoud Okken	Netherlands	1:48.25	Q
4	3	Jakub Holuša	Czech Republic	1:48.27	q
5	2	Cristian Vorovenci	Romania	1:48.88	
6	5	David Bustos	Spain	1:49.08	
7	1	Mario Scapini	Italy	1:49.13	
8	8	Lukas Rifesser	Italy	1:49.75	

==== Semifinal 2 ====
Rank	Lane	Name	Nationality	Time	Notes
1	3	Michael Rimmer	Great Britain & N.I.	1:47.67	Q
2	5	Luis Alberto Marco	Spain	1:47.79	Q
3	4	Adam Kszczot	Poland	1:47.84	Q
4	6	Hamid Oualich	France	1:48.06	q
5	2	Anis Ananenka	Belarus	1:48.41	
6	8	David McCarthy	Ireland	1:49.14	
7	7	Giordano Benedetti	Italy	1:49.33	
8	1	Brice Etes	Monaco	1:49.52	

==== Summary ====
Rank	Heat	Lane	Name	Nationality	Time	Notes
1	2	3	Michael Rimmer	Great Britain & N.I.	1:47.67	Q
2	2	5	Luis Alberto Marco	Spain	1:47.79	Q
3	2	4	Adam Kszczot	Poland	1:47.84	Q
4	2	6	Hamid Oualich	France	1:48.06	q
5	1	4	Kevin López	Spain	1:48.11	Q
6	1	6	Marcin Lewandowski	Poland	1:48.15	Q
7	1	7	Arnoud Okken	Netherlands	1:48.25	Q
8	1	3	Jakub Holuša	Czech Republic	1:48.27	q
9	2	2	Anis Ananenka	Belarus	1:48.41	
10	1	2	Cristian Vorovenci	Romania	1:48.88	
11	1	5	David Bustos	Spain	1:49.08	
12	1	1	Mario Scapini	Italy	1:49.13	
13	2	8	David McCarthy	Ireland	1:49.14	
14	2	7	Giordano Benedetti	Italy	1:49.33	
15	2	1	Brice Etes	Monaco	1:49.52	
16	1	8	Lukas Rifesser	Italy	1:49.75	

=== Final ===
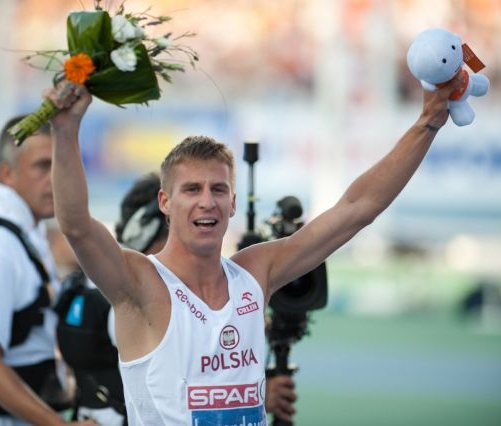
Lewandowski beat all-comers to attain his first senior European medal.

Rank	Lane	Name	Nationality	Time	Notes
1st place, gold medalist(s)	5	Marcin Lewandowski	Poland	1:47.07	
2nd place, silver medalist(s)	6	Michael Rimmer	Great Britain & N.I.	1:47.17	
3rd place, bronze medalist(s)	8	Adam Kszczot	Poland	1:47.22	
4	2	Arnoud Okken	Netherlands	1:47.31	
5	3	Jakub Holuša	Czech Republic	1:47.45	
6	7	Kevin López	Spain	1:47.82	
7	4	Luis Alberto Marco	Spain	1:48.42	
8	1	Hamid Oualich	France	1:49.77	
