= 2009 European Athletics Indoor Championships – Men's 800 metres =

The Men's 800 metres event at the 2009 European Athletics Indoor Championships was held on March 6–8.

== Medalists ==
Gold	Silver	Bronze
Yuriy Borzakovskiy; Russia	Luis Alberto Marco; Spain	Mattias Claesson; Sweden

== Results ==
=== Heats ===
First 2 of each heat (Q) and the next 4 fastest (q) qualified for the semifinals.

Rank	Heat	Name	Nationality	Time	Notes
1	2	Mattias Claesson	Sweden	1:47.83	Q, SB
2	4	Yuriy Borzakovskiy	Russia	1:48.10	Q
3	2	Luis Alberto Marco	Spain	1:48.14	Q
4	2	Vitaliy Voloshyn	Ukraine	1:48.26	q, PB
5	4	Miguel Quesada	Spain	1:48.37	Q
6	2	Yuriy Koldin	Russia	1:48.42	q, SB
7	4	Lukas Rifesser	Italy	1:48.49	q
8	4	David McCarthy	Ireland	1:49.59	q
9	4	Wouter de Boer	Netherlands	1:50.15	
10	2	Paweł Czapiewski	Poland	1:51.39	
11	1	Adam Kszczot	Poland	1:52.07	Q
12	1	Manuel Olmedo	Spain	1:52.24	Q
13	1	Robert Rotkirch	Finland	1:52.32	
14	1	René Bauschinger	Germany	1:52.50	
15	3	Marcin Lewandowski	Poland	1:54.19	Q
16	3	Oleksandr Osmolovych	Ukraine	1:54.29	Q
17	3	Dávid Takács	Hungary	1:54.45	
18	3	Andreas Rapatz	Austria	1:54.67	

=== Semifinals ===
First 3 of each semifinals qualified directly (Q) for the final.

Rank	Heat	Name	Nationality	Time	Notes
1	1	Yuriy Borzakovskiy	Russia	1:49.00	Q
2	1	Adam Kszczot	Poland	1:49.39	Q
3	1	Manuel Olmedo	Spain	1:49.52	Q
4	1	Oleksandr Osmolovych	Ukraine	1:49.60	
5	1	Lukas Rifesser	Italy	1:49.80	
6	1	Yuriy Koldin	Russia	1:49.91	
7	2	Mattias Claesson	Sweden	1:51.55	Q
8	2	Luis Alberto Marco	Spain	1:51.88	Q
9	2	Marcin Lewandowski	Poland	1:52.02	Q
10	2	Miguel Quesada	Spain	1:52.12	
11	2	Vitaliy Voloshyn	Ukraine	1:52.23	
12	2	David McCarthy	Ireland	1:53.53	

=== Final ===
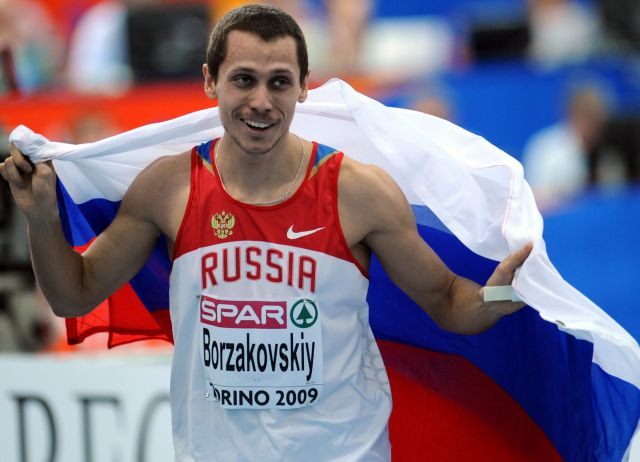
Yuriy Borzakovskiy won the gold for Russia.

Rank	Name	Nationality	Time	Notes
1st place, gold medalist(s)	Yuriy Borzakovskiy	Russia	1:48.55	
2nd place, silver medalist(s)	Luis Alberto Marco	Spain	1:49.15	
3rd place, bronze medalist(s)	Mattias Claesson	Sweden	1:49.32	
4	Adam Kszczot	Poland	1:49.52	
5	Manuel Olmedo	Spain	1:49.77	
6	Marcin Lewandowski	Poland	1:49.86	
