= 2011 European Athletics Indoor Championships – Men's 800 metres =

The Men's 800 metres event at the 2011 European Athletics Indoor Championships was held at March 4–6 with the final being held on March 6 at 15:45 local time.

== Records ==
Standing records prior to the 2011 European Athletics Indoor Championships
World record	Wilson Kipketer (DEN)	1:42.67	Paris, France	9 March 1997
European record	Wilson Kipketer (DEN)	1:42.67	Paris, France	9 March 1997
Championship record	Paweł Czapiewski (POL)	1:44.78	Vienna, Austria	3 March 2002
World Leading	Abubaker Kaki (SUD)	1:45.02	Stuttgart, Germany	5 February 2011
European Leading	Kevin López (ESP)	1:46.06	Sevilla, Spain	11 February 2011

== Results ==
=== Heats ===
First 2 in each heat and 2 best performers advanced to the Semifinals. The heats were held at 16:55.

Rank	Heat	Name	Nationality	Time	Notes
1	1	Marcin Lewandowski	Poland	1:48.81	Q
2	1	Mario Scapini	Italy	1:48.92	Q
3	1	David Bustos	Spain	1:49.04	q, SB
4	1	Darren McBrearty	Ireland	1:49.74	q
5	1	Andreas Rapatz	Austria	1:49.96	
6	5	Kevin López	Spain	1:50.15	Q
7	5	Joe Thomas	Great Britain	1:50.29	Q
8	2	Robin Schembera	Germany	1:50.54	Q
9	5	Stepan Poistogov	Russia	1:50.59	
10	2	Luis Alberto Marco	Spain	1:50.71	Q
11	2	Tamás Kazi	Hungary	1:50.85	
12	4	Oleksandr Osmolovych	Ukraine	1:50.99	Q
13	3	Adam Kszczot	Poland	1:51.02	Q
14	4	Andrew Osagie	Great Britain	1:51.09	Q
15	4	Anis Ananenka	Belarus	1:51.10	
16	4	Ivan Tukhtachev	Russia	1:51.11	
17	3	Hamid Oualich	France	1:51.13	Q
18	3	Sebastian Keiner	Germany	1:51.26	
19	3	Brice Etès	Monaco	1:51.75	
20	3	Cristian Vorovenci	Romania	1:51.83	
21	2	Thomas Roth	Norway	1:51.91	
22	2	Raphael Pallitsch	Austria	1:52.19	
23	5	Andreas Bube	Denmark	1:53.18	
24	4	Halit Kiliç	Turkey	1:53.33	
25	3	Daryl Vassallo	Gibraltar	2:02.41	
	5	Vitalij Kozlov	Lithuania	DNF	

=== Semifinals ===
First 3 in each heat advanced to the Final. The heats were held at 15:40.

Rank	Heat	Name	Nationality	Time	Notes
1	1	Andrew Osagie	Great Britain	1:49.02	Q
2	1	Adam Kszczot	Poland	1:49.38	Q
3	1	Kevin López	Spain	1:49.53	Q
4	1	Mario Scapini	Italy	1:49.57	
5	1	Darren McBrearty	Ireland	1:49.78	
6	1	David Bustos	Spain	1:50.46	
7	2	Luis Alberto Marco	Spain	1:50.60	Q
8	2	Marcin Lewandowski	Poland	1:50.75	Q
9	2	Robin Schembera	Germany	1:50.78	Q
10	2	Hamid Oualich	France	1:50.86	
11	2	Oleksandr Osmolovych	Ukraine	1:51.00	
12	2	Joe Thomas	Great Britain	1:51.44	

=== Final ===
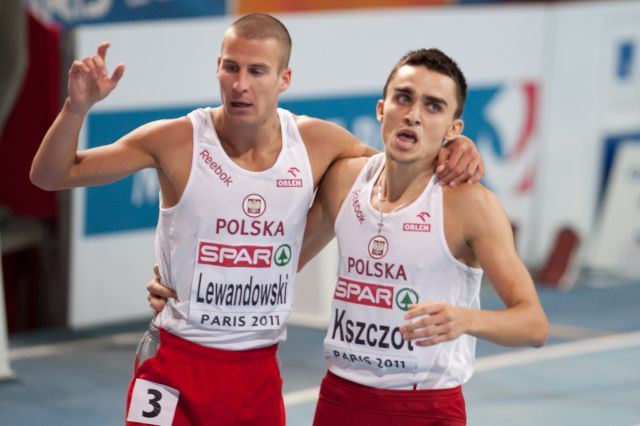
Lewandowski and Kszczot of Poland.

The final was held at 15:45.

Rank	Lane	Name	Nationality	Time	Notes
1st place, gold medalist(s)	2	Adam Kszczot	Poland	1:47.87	
2nd place, silver medalist(s)	3	Marcin Lewandowski	Poland	1:48.23	
3rd place, bronze medalist(s)	5	Kevin López	Spain	1:48.35	
4	6	Andrew Osagie	Great Britain	1:48.50	
5	1	Luis Alberto Marco	Spain	2:00.58	
	4	Robin Schembera	Germany	DNF	
