= 2012 IAAF World Indoor Championships – Men's 800 metres =

Athletics event

The men's 800 metres at the 2012 IAAF World Indoor Championships will be held at the Ataköy Athletics Arena on 9 and 11 March. The gold medal was won by 18-year-old Mohammed Aman of Ethiopia, in a time of 1:48.36 seconds.

In the 800 metres final there were 6 competitors all from different nations. Jakub Holuša had run the fastest time in the semi-final (1:47.23) placing in front of the gold medalist, Mohammed Aman. Going into the final Adam Kszczot was the favourite to win the race. At the end of the first lap Kszczot was leading and looking to pull away from the pack. At the 400 metre mark Kszczot was still winning the race after coming through with a time of 56.29 seconds. Kszczot kept his lead until the 700 metre mark where Mohammed Aman made a move and overtook him. Holuša and Osagie followed suite and also overtook Kszczot on the home strait.

== Medalists ==
Gold	Silver	Bronze
Mohammed Aman; Ethiopia	Jakub Holuša; Czech Republic	Andrew Osagie; United Kingdom

== Records ==
Standing records prior to the 2012 IAAF World Indoor Championships
World record	Wilson Kipketer (DEN)	1:42.67	Paris, France	9 March 1997
Championship record	Wilson Kipketer (DEN)	1:42.67	Paris, France	9 March 1997
World Leading	Adam Kszczot (POL)	1:44.57	Liévin, France	14 February 2012
African record	Joseph Mutua (KEN)	1:44.71	Stuttgart, Germany	31 January 2004
Asian record	Yusuf Saad Kamel (BHR)	1:45.26	Valencia, Spain	9 March 2008
European record	Wilson Kipketer (DEN)	1:42.67	Paris, France	9 March 1997
North and Central American and Caribbean record	Johnny Gray (USA)	1:45.00	Sindelfingen, Germany	8 March 1992
Oceanian Record	Ryan Foster (AUS)	1:47.48	State College, United States	30 January 2010
South American record	José Luíz Barbosa (BRA)	1:45.43	Piraeus, Greece	8 March 1989

== Qualification standards ==
Indoor	Outdoor
1:48.00	1:45.00

== Schedule ==
Date	Time	Round
9 March 2012	10:10	Heats
10 March 2012	11:50	Semi-final
11 March 2012	16:20	Final

== Results ==
=== Heats ===
Qualification: First 2 (Q) plus the 6 fastest times qualified (q)

Rank	Heat	Name	Nationality	Time	Notes
1	6	Boaz Kiplagat Lalang	Kenya	1:49.50	Q
2	2	Timothy Kitum	Kenya	1:49.57	Q
3	2	Musaeb Abdulrahman Balla	Qatar	1:49.71	Q
4	6	Michael Rutt	United States	1:49.72	Q
5	2	Andrew Osagie	Great Britain	1:49.73	q
5	4	Joe Thomas	Great Britain	1:49.73	Q
7	2	Raphael Pallitsch	Austria	1:49.78	q
8	6	Julius Mutekanga	Uganda	1:49.81	q
9	4	Andreas Rapatz	Austria	1:49.89	Q
10	1	Antonio Manuel Reina	Spain	1:50.02	Q
10	4	Rafith Rodríguez	Colombia	1:50.02	q
12	4	Luis Alberto Marco	Spain	1:50.13	q
13	1	Adam Kszczot	Poland	1:50.14	Q
14	3	Jakub Holuša	Czech Republic	1:50.49	Q
15	3	Mohammed Aman	Ethiopia	1:50.56	Q
16	1	Tevan Everett	United States	1:50.67	q
17	3	Ismail Ahmed Ismail	Sudan	1:50.72	
18	6	Farkhod Kuralov	Tajikistan	1:52.61	NR
19	3	Moussa Camara	Mali	1:52.62	NR
20	5	Jan Van Den Broeck	Belgium	1:52.65	Q
21	5	Marcin Lewandowski	Poland	1:52.67	Q
22	5	Jamaal James	Trinidad and Tobago	1:52.71	
23	2	Brice Etes	Monaco	1:52.93	
24	5	Vid Jakob Tršan	Slovenia	1:53.64	
25	3	Halit Kiliç	Turkey	1:54.06	
26	6	Dustin Emrani	Israel	1:54.20	
27	2	Arnold Sorina	Vanuatu	1:54.44	NR
28	1	Nimet Gashi	Albania	1:54.70	
29	1	Gaylord Silly	Seychelles	1:54.93	NR
30	4	Benjamín Enzema	Equatorial Guinea	1:58.19	NR
31	5	Ashot Hayrapetyan	Armenia	1:58.21	
32	4	Kieng Samorn	Cambodia	1:59.14	NR

=== Semi-final ===
Qualification: First 2 of each heat qualified (Q)

Rank	Heat	Name	Nationality	Time	Notes
1	3	Jakub Holuša	Czech Republic	1:47.23	Q, SB
2	3	Adam Kszczot	Poland	1:47.90	Q
3	1	Mohammed Aman	Ethiopia	1:48.07	Q
4	3	Luis Alberto Marco	Spain	1:48.12	
5	1	Andrew Osagie	Great Britain	1:48.13	Q
6	3	Andreas Rapatz	Austria	1:48.15	
7	1	Timothy Kitum	Kenya	1:48.22	
8	1	Antonio Manuel Reina	Spain	1:48.36	
9	2	Michael Rutt	United States	1:48.88	Q
10	2	Jan Van Den Broeck	Belgium	1:48.90	Q
11	3	Joe Thomas	Great Britain	1:49.12	
12	2	Boaz Kiplagat Lalang	Kenya	1:49.31	
13	1	Julius Mutekanga	Uganda	1:49.32	
14	2	Raphael Pallitsch	Austria	1:49.42	
15	1	Musaeb Abdulrahman Balla	Qatar	1:49.51	
16	3	Tevan Everett	United States	1:49.57	
	2	Rafith Rodríguez	Colombia	DNF	
	2	Marcin Lewandowski	Poland	DNF	

=== Final ===
6 athletes from 6 countries participated. The final started at 16:20.

Rank	Name	Nationality	Time	Notes
1st place, gold medalist(s)	Mohammed Aman	Ethiopia	1:48.36	
2nd place, silver medalist(s)	Jakub Holuša	Czech Republic	1:48.62	
3rd place, bronze medalist(s)	Andrew Osagie	Great Britain	1:48.92	
4	Adam Kszczot	Poland	1:49.16	
5	Jan van den Broeck	Belgium	1:50.83	
6	Michael Rutt	United States	1:51.47	
