= 2010 IAAF World Indoor Championships – Men's 800 metres =

The men's 800 metres at the 2010 IAAF World Indoor Championships was held at the ASPIRE Dome on 12, 13 and 14 March.

== Medalists ==
Gold	Silver	Bronze
Abubaker Kaki; Sudan	Boaz Kiplagat Lalang; Kenya	Adam Kszczot; Poland

== Records ==
Standing records prior to the 2010 IAAF World Indoor Championships
World record	Wilson Kipketer (DEN)	1:42.67	Paris, France	9 March 1997
Championship record	Wilson Kipketer (DEN)	1:42.67	Paris, France	9 March 1997
World Leading	Yuriy Borzakovskiy (RUS)	1:45.77	Düsseldorf, Germany	3 February 2010
African record	Joseph Mutua (KEN)	1:44.71	Stuttgart, Germany	31 January 2004
Asian record	Yusuf Saad Kamel (BHR)	1:45.26	Valencia, Spain	9 March 2008
European record	Wilson Kipketer (DEN)	1:42.67	Paris, France	9 March 1997
North and Central American and Caribbean record	Johnny Gray (USA)	1:45.00	Sindelfingen, Germany	8 March 1992
Oceanian Record	Ryan Foster (AUS)	1:47.48	State College, United States	30 January 2010
South American record	José Luíz Barbosa (BRA)	1:45.43	Piraeus, Greece	8 March 1989

== Qualification standards ==
Indoor	Outdoor
1:48.50	1:45.50

== Schedule ==
Date	Time	Round
March 12, 2010	11:00	Heats
March 13, 2010	11:00	Semifinals
March 14, 2010	17:30	Final

== Results ==
=== Heats ===
Qualification: First 2 in each heat (Q) and the next 2 fastest (q) advance to the semifinals.

Rank	Heat	Name	Nationality	Time	Notes
1	1	Ismail Ahmed Ismail	Sudan	1:46.69	Q
2	1	Andrew Osagie	Great Britain	1:47.40	Q, PB
3	2	Abubaker Kaki	Sudan	1:47.48	Q
4	2	David Bustos	Spain	1:47.65	Q
5	2	Fabiano Peçanha	Brazil	1:48.29	q, PB
6	4	Boaz Kiplagat Lalang	Kenya	1:49.16	Q
7	4	Luis Alberto Marco	Spain	1:49.57	Q
8	4	Duane Solomon	United States	1:49.69	q
9	1	Kléberson Davide	Brazil	1:49.69	PB
10	5	Adam Kszczot	Poland	1:50.15	Q
11	2	Ed Aston	Great Britain	1:50.32	
12	5	Andreas Rapatz	Austria	1:50.35	Q
13	5	Moise Joseph	Haiti	1:50.43	
14	3	Kévin Hautcœur	France	1:50.61	Q
15	3	Jakub Holuša	Czech Republic	1:50.64	Q
16	3	Mario Scapini	Italy	1:50.74	
17	5	Vitalij Kozlov	Lithuania	1:50.92	
18	5	Belal Mansoor Ali	Bahrain	1:51.22	SB
19	3	David McCarthy	Ireland	1:51.88	SB
20	3	Mattias Claesson	Sweden	1:51.96	
21	4	Mohammad Al-Azemi	Kuwait	1:52.54	
22	1	Brice Etès	Monaco	1:53.52	
23	5	Moussa Camara	Mali	1:55.84	PB
24	4	Elie Monga	Democratic Republic of the Congo	1:57.02	PB
25	2	Edgar Cortez	Nicaragua	1:58.47	PB
26	4	Iulio Lafai	Samoa	2:07.08	PB
	1	Nick Symmonds	United States	DQ	

=== Semifinals ===
Qualification: First 3 in each heat (Q) advance to the final.

Rank	Heat	Name	Nationality	Time	Notes
1	1	Abubaker Kaki	Sudan	1:46.45	Q
2	1	Boaz Kiplagat Lalang	Kenya	1:46.73	Q
3	1	Adam Kszczot	Poland	1:46.90	Q
4	1	David Bustos	Spain	1:47.05	PB
5	1	Kévin Hautcœur	France	1:47.50	PB
6	1	Fabiano Peçanha	Brazil	1:49.70	
7	2	Luis Alberto Marco	Spain	1:51.05	Q
8	2	Jakub Holuša	Czech Republic	1:51.08	Q
9	2	Ismail Ahmed Ismail	Sudan	1:51.25	Q
10	2	Andrew Osagie	Great Britain	1:51.29	
11	2	Duane Solomon	United States	1:51.82	
12	2	Andreas Rapatz	Austria	1:52.43	

=== Final ===
Rank	Name	Nationality	Time	Notes
Gold medal	Abubaker Kaki	Sudan	1:46.23	SB
Silver medal	Boaz Kiplagat Lalang	Kenya	1:46.39	
Bronze medal	Adam Kszczot	Poland	1:46.69	
4	Ismail Ahmed Ismail	Sudan	1:46.90	
5	Jakub Holuša	Czech Republic	1:47.28	
6	Luis Alberto Marco	Spain	1:48.99	
