= David Bustos =

Spanish middle-distance runner

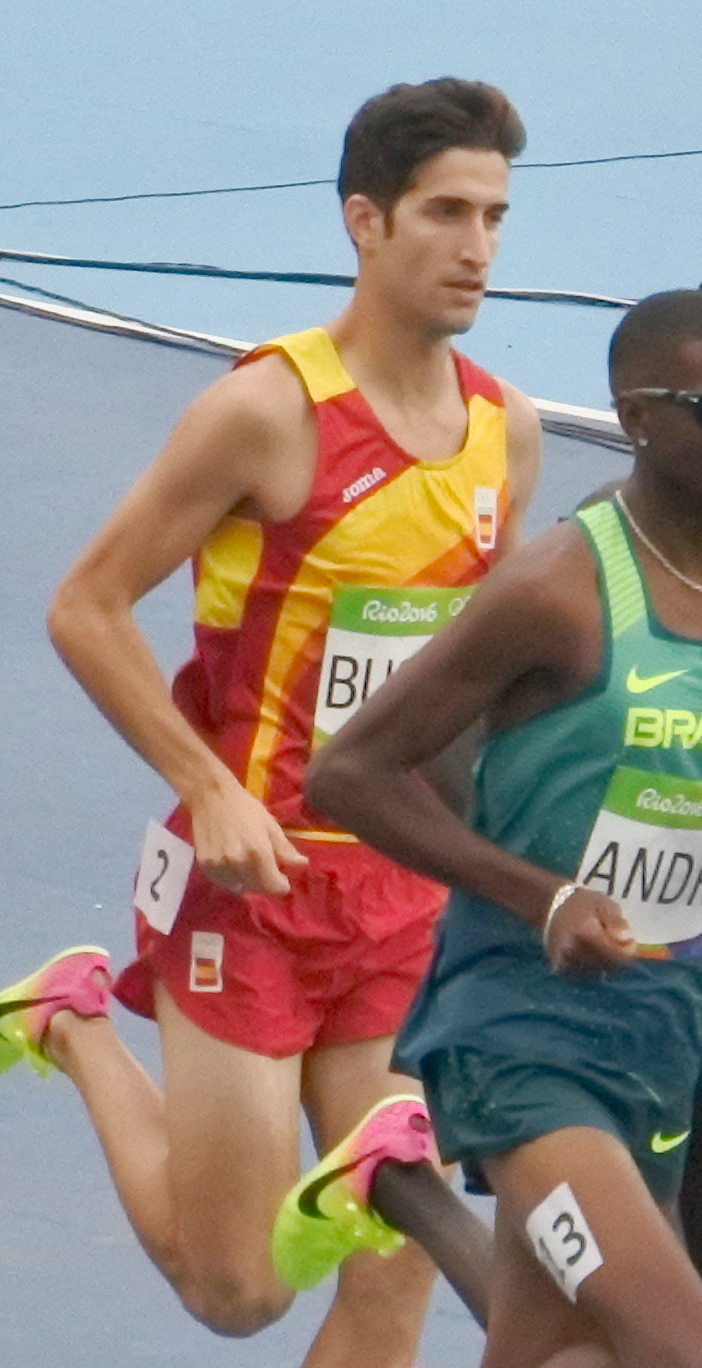
- Bustos at the 2016 Olympics

Personal information
- Born: 25 August 1990 (age 35) Palma de Mallorca, Spain
- Height: 182 cm (6 ft 0 in)
- Weight: 64 kg (141 lb)

Sport
- Sport: Track and field
- Club: CD Nike Running
- Coached by: Antonio Roig Serra
Medal record
Representing Spain
European Championships
Silver medal – second place	2016 Amsterdam	1500 m
Bronze medal – third place	2012 Helsinki	1500 m

David Bustos González (born 25 August 1990) is a Spanish runner who specializes in the 800 metres and 1500 metres races.

== Personal life ==
Bustos played hockey and football, and trained in swimming. He took up athletics only in high school, and focused on running in 2005. He has a degree in business administration from the Open University of Catalonia. He is married to Talania Buria Garcia.

== Career ==
In the 1500 metres he finished fourth at the 2007 World Youth Championships and competed at the 2008 World Junior Championships without reaching the final. In the 800 metres he won the gold medal at the 2009 European Junior Championships, and competed at the 2010 World Indoor Championships without reaching the final.

His personal best 800 metres time indoors is 1:47.05 minutes, achieved at the 2010 World Indoor Championships in Doha. His outdoor 800 m personal best is 1:46.12 set in Barakaldo. He has a personal best time of 3:34.77 minutes in the 1500 metres, achieved in June 2012 in Huelva.

The following years Bustos continued to be a staple in Spanish middle-distance running. He participated in European Championships and World Championships but did not manage to break through to the very top of international competition. In 2014, he finished 5th in the European Athletics Championships in Zurich, which was one of his notable performances on the European stage. In 2016 Rio Olympics he came 7th (1000m). In 2018, Bustos achieved some of his best results since his 2012 peak. He showed a 2:25.00 result in 2018 in Ibiza (1000m). The COVID-19 pandemic affected athletic seasons worldwide, but Bustos was able to compete in local and international meets after the restrictions lifted. He achieved notable results in the Spanish Championships, securing podium finishes and maintaining a position within Spain's top runners. David Bustos represented Spain in the World Athletics Championships and Olympic Games.

== Achievements ==
Year	Competition	Venue	Position	Event	Notes
Representing Spain
2008	World Junior Championships	Bydgoszcz, Poland	7th (h)	1500m	3:48.54
2009	European Junior Championships	Novi Sad, Serbia	1st	1500 m	3:43.19
2010	World Indoor Championships	Doha, Qatar	4th (sf)	800 m	1:47.05
2010	Ibero-American Championships	San Fernando, Spain	1st	1500 m	3:53.31
2010	European Championships	Barcelona, Spain	11th (sf)	800 m	1:49.08
2011	European Indoor Championships	Paris, France	6th (sf)	800 m	1:50.46
2011	European U23 Championships	Ostrava, Czech Republic	3rd	1500 m	3:50.59
2012	World Indoor Championships	Istanbul, Turkey	13th (h)	1500 m	3:43.66
2012	European Championships	Helsinki, Finland	3rd	1500 m	3:46.45
2012	Olympic Games	London, United Kingdom	23rd (h)	1500 m	3:41.34
2013	European Indoor Championships	Gothenburg, Sweden	8th	1500 m	3:40.14
2013	World Championships	Moscow, Russia	30th (h)	1500 m	3:41.69
2014	European Championships	Zürich, Switzerland	6th	1500 m	3:46.92
2015	World Championships	Beijing, China	12th (sf)	1500 m	3:42.48
2016	European Championships	Amsterdam, Netherlands	2nd	1500 m	3:46.90
2016	Olympic Games	Rio de Janeiro, Brazil	7th	1500 m	3:51.06
2017	World Championships	London, United Kingdom	36th (h)	1500 m	3:47.52
