= Luis Alberto Marco =

Spanish middle-distance runner

Medal record

Representing Spain

Men's athletics

European Indoor Championships
Silver medal – second place	2009 Torino	800 m

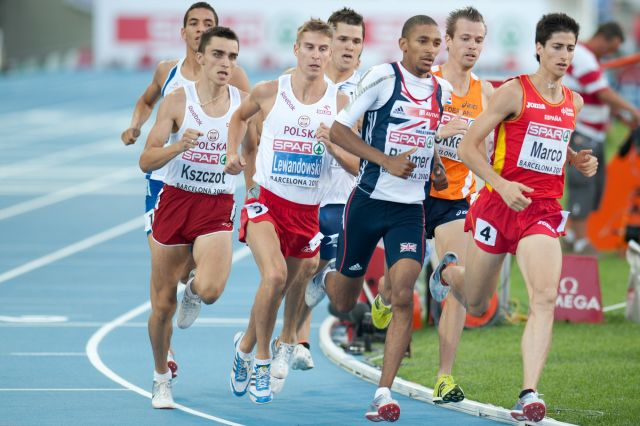
Luis Alberto Marco (far right) during the 800 metres final at the 2010 European Championships

Luis Alberto Marco Contreras (born 20 August 1986) is a Spanish middle-distance runner. He specializes in the 800 metres.

Marco was born in Seville. He finished eleventh in the 1500 metres at the 2003 World Youth Championships. In the 800 metres he finished fourth at the 2007 European Indoor Championships and won the silver medal at the 2009 European Indoor Championships.

Marco was a finalist at the 2010 European Championships in Athletics in Barcelona.

His personal best time is 1:45.14 minutes, achieved in June 2012 in Huelva.

== Competition record ==
Year	Competition	Venue	Position	Event	Notes
Representing Spain
2003	World Youth Championships	Sherbrooke, Canada	11th	1500 m	3:57.60
2004	World Junior Championships	Grosseto, Italy	23rd (h)	800 m	1:52.85
2005	European Junior Championships	Kaunas, Lithuania	4th	1500 m	3:47.22
2007	European Indoor Championships	Birmingham, United Kingdom	4th	800 m	1:48.71
2007	European U23 Championships	Debrecen, Hungary	18th (h)	800 m	1:50.91
2009	European Indoor Championships	Turin, Italy	2nd	800 m	1:49.15
2009	World Championships	Berlin, Germany	39th (h)	800 m	1:48.47
2010	World Indoor Championships	Doha, Qatar	6th	800 m	1:48.99
2010	Ibero-American Championships	San Fernando, Spain	6th	800 m	1:47.28
2010	European Championships	Barcelona, Spain	7th	800 m	1:48.42
2011	European Indoor Championships	Paris, France	5th	800 m	2:00.58
2011	World Championships	Daegu, South Korea	21st (sf)	800 m	1:47.45
2012	World Indoor Championships	Istanbul, Turkey	4th (sf)	800 m	1:48.12
2012	European Championships	Helsinki, Finland	19th (sf)	800 m	1:49.06
2012	Olympic Games	London, United Kingdom	18th (sf)	800 m	1:46.19
2013	European Indoor Championships	Gothenburg, Sweden	6th	800 m	1:51.69
2013	World Championships	Moscow, Russia	18th (sf)	800 m	1:46.75
2014	IAAF World Relays	Nassau, Bahamas	5th	4 × 800 m	7:19.90
2014	European Championships	Zürich, Switzerland	29th (h)	800 m	1:50.07
2015	European Indoor Championships	Prague, Czech Republic	22nd (h)	800 m	1:50.01
