= Hamid Oualich =

French middle-distance runner

Hamid Oualich, born on April 26, 1988, in Ouarzazate, is a French middle-distance runner.

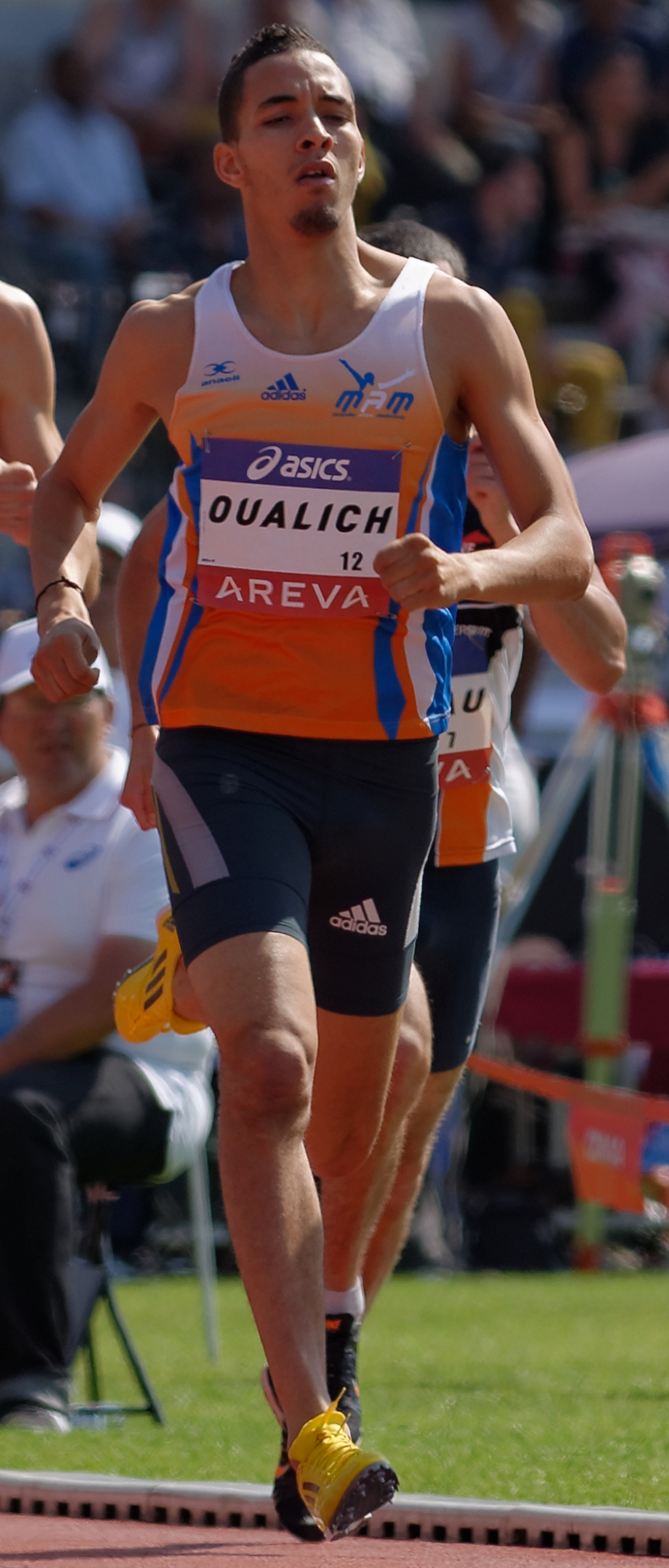

== Achievements ==
Year	Competition	Venue	Position	Event	Notes
Representing France
2007	European Junior Championships	Hengelo, Netherlands	6th	800 m	1:49.97
2009	European U23 Championships	Kaunas, Lithuania	22nd (h)	800 m	1:53.73
2010	European Championships	Barcelona, Spain	8th	800 m	1:49.77
2011	European Indoor Championships	Paris, France	10th (sf)	800 m	1:50.86
2012	European Championships	Helsinki, Finland	8th (sf)	800 m	1:47.14
2013	Jeux de la Francophonie	Nice, France	5th	800 m	1:50.27
