= Joni Jaako =

Swedish sprinter (born 1986)

Joni Jaako (born 24 February 1986) is a Swedish athlete who specialized in the 400 metres and later the 800 metres. His highest international placement was a fourth place in the 4 × 400 metres relay at the 2006 World Indoor Championships. He also competed at two European Championships. His two Swedish national titles came in 2008 and 2011.

== Personal life ==
Hailing from Finspång, Jaako took up athletics in the club Finspångs AIK at the age of nine. He is of Finnish descent. He later represented GoIF Tjalve in Norrköping and also Hammarby IF before returning to his boyhood club Finspångs AIK in 2015, as he also bought a house in Sturefors. He formerly resided in Linköping, where he criticized the local stadium for being closed too often.

== Career ==
In his early 400 metres career, Jaako finished fifth at the 2003 European Youth Olympic Festival and seventh at the 2005 European Junior Championships. His time in the semi-final was 47.04 seconds, almost a whole second below his personal best from the year before. He also took his first Swedish junior championship title, and when he finished fifth at the Swedish championships, he did so in his second best time ever of 47.09 seconds.

In the 4 × 400 metres relay event, Jaako participated at the 2005 European Junior Championships without reaching the final, recording a time of 3:11.13 minutes. On the back of a bronze medal at the 2006 Swedish Indoor Championships, Jaako was chosen for the Swedish 4 × 400 metres relay team at the 2006 World Indoor Championships together with Johan Wissman, Andreas Mokdasi and Mattias Claesson. The quartet ran in 3:07.10 minutes in the heats, smashing the previous Swedish indoor record which was 3:10.09 minutes. The final ended in 3:07.32 minutes and a fourth place.

Jaako ran in the relay at the 2006 European Championships, on home soil in Gothenburg, as well as at the 2007 European U23 Championships without reaching the final. In 2006, Jaako also won bronze at the Swedish championships, and won the DN Galan race in a season's best of 47.37 seconds. He missed the individual championships of 2007.

In 2008 he switched events to the 800 metres. He immediately became Swedish champion, running in a time of 1:49.60 which he lowered to 1:49.18 at the Finland–Sweden Athletics International where he finished second. In 2009, Jaako took silver at the nationals and bronze at the Finland–Sweden International, the latter in a personal beest of 1:48.42 minutes. Another improvement to 1:47.36 minutes in July 2010 in Karlstad qualified him for the 2010 European Championships the same month, where he was eliminated in the heats. He ended the season by winning the Finland–Sweden International.

Jaako's goal for 2011 was to qualify for the World Championships as well as "threaten the Swedish record" of 1:45.45. He finished seventh at the 2011 European Team Championships Super League, followed by 1:47.01 in Sollentuna in June before he became the 2011 Swedish champion. He entered his fourth Finland–Sweden International in a row, but fell in the final curve.

After sitting out 2012, Jaako tried the 1500 metres in 2013 and won a silver at the Swedish nationals, contrasted to only a fifth place in the 800 metres. He finished second in the 1500 at the Finland–Sweden International. He later dropped the 1500 metres. By 2016 he earned money as a pacemaker.
