= Brice Etès =

Monegasque middle-distance runner

Personal information
- Nationality: Monégasque
- Born: 11 April 1984 (age 42) Monaco
- Height: 1.85 m (6 ft 1 in)
- Weight: 73 kg (161 lb)

Sport
- Country: Monaco
- Sport: Athletics
- Event: 800 m
Medal record
Games of the Small States of Europe
Gold medal – first place	Monaco 2007	800 m
Gold medal – first place	Monaco 2007	1500 m
Gold medal – first place	Liechtenstein 2011	800 m
Silver medal – second place	Liechtenstein 2011	400 m
Silver medal – second place	Luxembourg 2013	800 m
Bronze medal – third place	Liechtenstein 2011	4x400 m
Bronze medal – third place	San Marino 2017	4x400 m

Brice Etès (born 11 April 1984 in Monaco) is a Monégasque athlete of French descent who is a middle-distance specialist.

== Career ==
He holds the national record in Monaco 1:47.61, reached at the 2010 IAAF Diamond League which was held in Monaco (9th), but his personal time is 1:47.03, obtained in 2008 when he did not yet hold Monegasque nationality.

He qualified for the semifinals of the 800m at the 2010 European Athletics Championships after the fall of many opponents in his series. He won the Games of the Small States of Europe in 2005, 2007, 2011 (4th in 2009). He represented Monaco at the 2011 World Championships which was held in Daegu, South Korea, where he was eliminated in the heats.

He competed in the men's 800 m event at the 2016 Summer Olympics in Rio de Janeiro. He finished 8th in his heat with a time of 1:50.40 and did not qualify for the semifinals. He was the flagbearer for Monaco during the Parade of Nations.

== Competition record ==
Year	Competition	Venue	Position	Event	Notes
Representing Monaco
2001	Games of the Small States of Europe	Serravalle, San Marino	3rd	800 m	1:53.66
2003	Games of the Small States of Europe	Marsa, Malta	4th	800 m	1:53.13
2003	Games of the Small States of Europe	Marsa, Malta	4th	4 × 400 m relay	3:20.19
2005	Games of the Small States of Europe	Andorra la Vella, Andorra	1st	800 m	1:54.71
2005	Games of the Small States of Europe	Andorra la Vella, Andorra	4th	4 × 400 m relay	3:21.66
2007	Games of the Small States of Europe	Fontvieille, Monaco	1st	800 m	1:51.29
2007	Games of the Small States of Europe	Fontvieille, Monaco	1st	1500 m	3:53.95
2007	Games of the Small States of Europe	Fontvieille, Monaco	4th	4 × 400 m relay	3:18.82
2009	Games of the Small States of Europe	Nicosia, Cyprus	4th	800 m	1:53.93
2009	Games of the Small States of Europe	Nicosia, Cyprus	5th	4 × 100 m relay	44.00
2009	Games of the Small States of Europe	Nicosia, Cyprus	4th	4 × 400 m relay	3:18.82
2010	World Indoor Championships	Doha, Qatar	22nd (h)	800 m	1:53.52
2010	European Championships	Barcelona, Spain	15th (sf)	800 m	1:49.52
2011	European Indoor Championships	Paris, France	19th (h)	800 m	1:51.75
2011	Games of the Small States of Europe	Schaan, Liechtenstein	2nd	400 m	48.63 (NR)
2011	Games of the Small States of Europe	Schaan, Liechtenstein	1st	800 m	1:52.31
2011	Games of the Small States of Europe	Schaan, Liechtenstein	3rd	4 × 400 m relay	3:20.10 (NR)
2011	World Championships	Daegu, South Korea	29th (h)	800 m	1:48.22
2012	World Indoor Championships	Istanbul, Turkey	23rd (h)	800 m	1:52.93
2012	European Championships	Helsinki, Finland	–	800 m	DNF
2013	European Indoor Championships	Gothenburg, Sweden	–	800 m	DQ
2013	Games of the Small States of Europe	Luxembourg, Luxembourg	8th (h)	400 m	49.50
2013	Games of the Small States of Europe	Luxembourg, Luxembourg	2nd	800 m	1:54.05
2013	Games of the Small States of Europe	Luxembourg, Luxembourg	4th	4 × 400 m relay	3:21.15
2013	Mediterranean Games	Mersin, Turkey	13th (q)	800 m	1:50.55
2013	World Championships	Moscow, Russia	42nd (h)	800 m	1:53.60
2014	World Indoor Championships	Sopot, Poland	15th (h)	800 m	1:51.24
2015	European Indoor Championships	Prague, Czech Republic	38th (h)	800 m	1:51.57
2015	Games of the Small States of Europe	Reykjavík, Iceland	2nd	800 m	1:57.67
2015	Games of the Small States of Europe	Reykjavík, Iceland	4th	1500 m	3:57.41
2015	World Championships	Beijing, China	31st (h)	800 m	1:48.52
2016	European Championships	Amsterdam, Netherlands	23rd (h)	800 m	1:50.53
2016	Olympic Games	Rio de Janeiro, Brazil	48th (h)	800 m	1:50.40
2017	European Indoor Championships	Belgrade, Serbia	20th (h)	800 m	1:51.35
2017	Games of the Small States of Europe	Serravalle, San Marino	3rd	4 × 400 m relay	3:15.46
