= 2016 European Athletics Championships – Men's 800 metres =

Men's 800 metres at the 2016 European Athletics Championships
- Venue: Olympic Stadium
- Location: Amsterdam
- Dates: July 7 (heats); July 8 (semifinals); July 10 (final)
- Competitors: 30 from 21 nations
- Winning time: 1:45.18

Medalists
gold medal	Adam Kszczot	Poland
silver medal	Marcin Lewandowski	Poland
bronze medal	Elliot Giles	Great Britain

The men's 800 metres at the 2016 European Athletics Championships took place at the Olympic Stadium on 7, 8, and 10 July.

== Records ==
Standing records prior to the 2016 European Athletics Championships
World record	David Rudisha (KEN)	1:40.91	London, Great Britain	9 August 2012
European record	Wilson Kipketer (DEN)	1:41.11	Cologne, Germany	24 August 1997
Championship record	Olaf Beyer (GDR)	1:43.84	Prague, Czechoslovakia	31 August 1978
World Leading	Nicholas Kiplangat Kipkoech (KEN)	1:43.37	Nairobi, Kenya	29 April 2016
European Leading	Pierre-Ambroise Bosse (FRA)	1:44.51	Rabat, Morocco	22 May 2016

== Schedule ==
Date	Time	Round
7 July 2016	12:05	Round 1
8 July 2016	18:35	Semifinals
10 July 2016	18:30	Final

All times are local times (UTC+2)

== Results ==
=== Round 1 ===
First 3 (Q) and next 4 fastest (q) qualify for the semifinals.

Rank	Heat	Lane	Name	Nationality	Time	Note
1	3	5	Thijmen Kupers	Netherlands	1:46.48	Q
2	3	3	Amel Tuka	Bosnia and Herzegovina	1:46.94	Q
3	3	7	Benedikt Huber	Germany	1:47.16	Q
4	3	4	Jacopo Lahbi	Italy	1:47.27	q, SB
5	3	1	Charles Grethen	Luxembourg	1:47.39	q
6	1	4	Pierre-Ambroise Bosse	France	1:48.35	Q
7	3	8	Aaron Botterman	Belgium	1:48.35	q
8	1	8	Andreas Bube	Denmark	1:48.36	Q
9	1	5	Álvaro de Arriba	Spain	1:48.62	Q
10	1	7	Žan Rudolf	Slovenia	1:48.72	q
11	1	2	Musa Hajdari	Kosovo	1:48.97	
12	3	6	Jozef Repčík	Slovakia	1:49.32	
13	3	2	Karl Griffin	Ireland	1:49.37	SB
14	4	8	Adam Kszczot	Poland	1:49.38	Q
15	4	2	Daniel Andújar	Spain	1:49.57	Q
16	4	1	Sören Ludolph	Germany	1:49.59	Q
17	1	3	Roman Yarko	Ukraine	1:49.64	
18	4	5	Kalle Berglund	Sweden	1:49.65	
19	4	4	Pol Moya	Andorra	1:50.03	
20	4	3	Declan Murray	Ireland	1:50.10	
21	2	5	Elliot Giles	Great Britain	1:50.31	Q
22	2	8	Marcin Lewandowski	Poland	1:50.32	Q
23	4	7	Brice Etès	Monaco	1:50.53	SB
24	2	4	Giordano Benedetti	Italy	1:50.74	Q
25	2	6	Hugo Santacruz	Switzerland	1:51.00	
26	1	6	Tigran Mkrtchyan	Armenia	1:51.28	
27	2	3	Sofiane Selmouni	France	1:51.32	
28	2	7	Jan Petrac	Slovenia	1:52.21	
29	4	6	Jamie Webb	Great Britain	1:53.75	
	2	2	Kevin López	Spain	DNS	

=== Semifinals ===
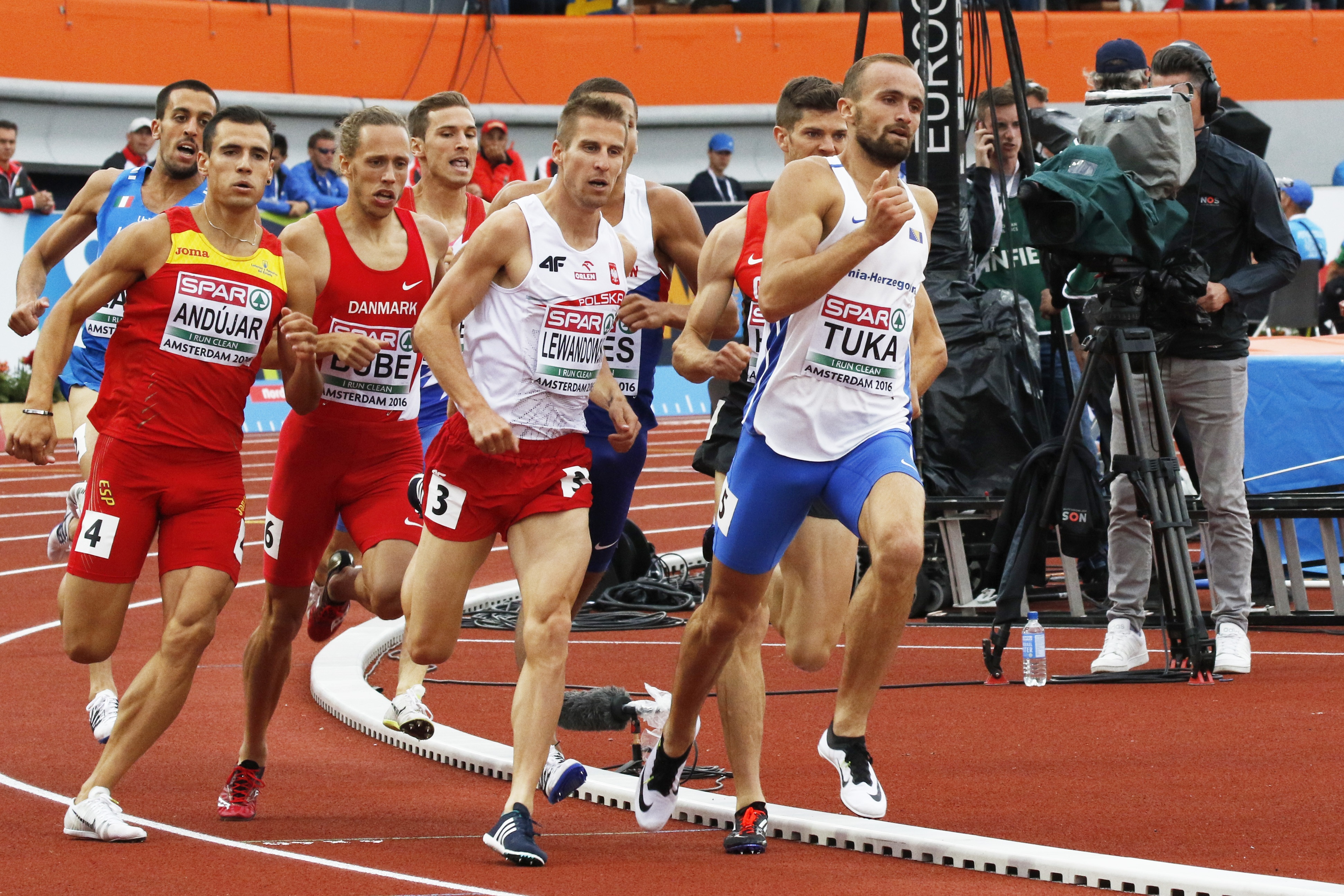
Semifinal 2

First 3 (Q) and next 2 fastest (q) qualify for the final.

Rank	Heat	Lane	Name	Nationality	Time	Note
1	1	3	Adam Kszczot	Poland	1:46.32	Q
2	1	4	Pierre-Ambroise Bosse	France	1:46.45	Q
3	1	6	Thijmen Kupers	Netherlands	1:46.61	Q
4	1	8	Giordano Benedetti	Italy	1:46.74	q
5	2	3	Marcin Lewandowski	Poland	1:47.16	Q
5	2	5	Amel Tuka	Bosnia and Herzegovina	1:47.16	Q
7	2	1	Elliot Giles	Great Britain	1:47.31	Q
8	1	5	Alvaro de Arriba	Spain	1:47.40	q
9	2	6	Andreas Bube	Denmark	1:47.55	
10	2	7	Benedikt Huber	Germany	1:47.56	
11	2	4	Daniel Andújar	Spain	1:47.64	
12	2	2	Jacopo Lahbi	Italy	1:48.47	
13	2	8	Charles Grethen	Luxembourg	1:49.40	
14	1	2	Aaron Botterman	Belgium	1:49.92	
15	1	7	Sören Ludolph	Germany	1:51.69	
16	1	1	Žan Rudolf	Slovenia	1:54.49	

=== Final ===
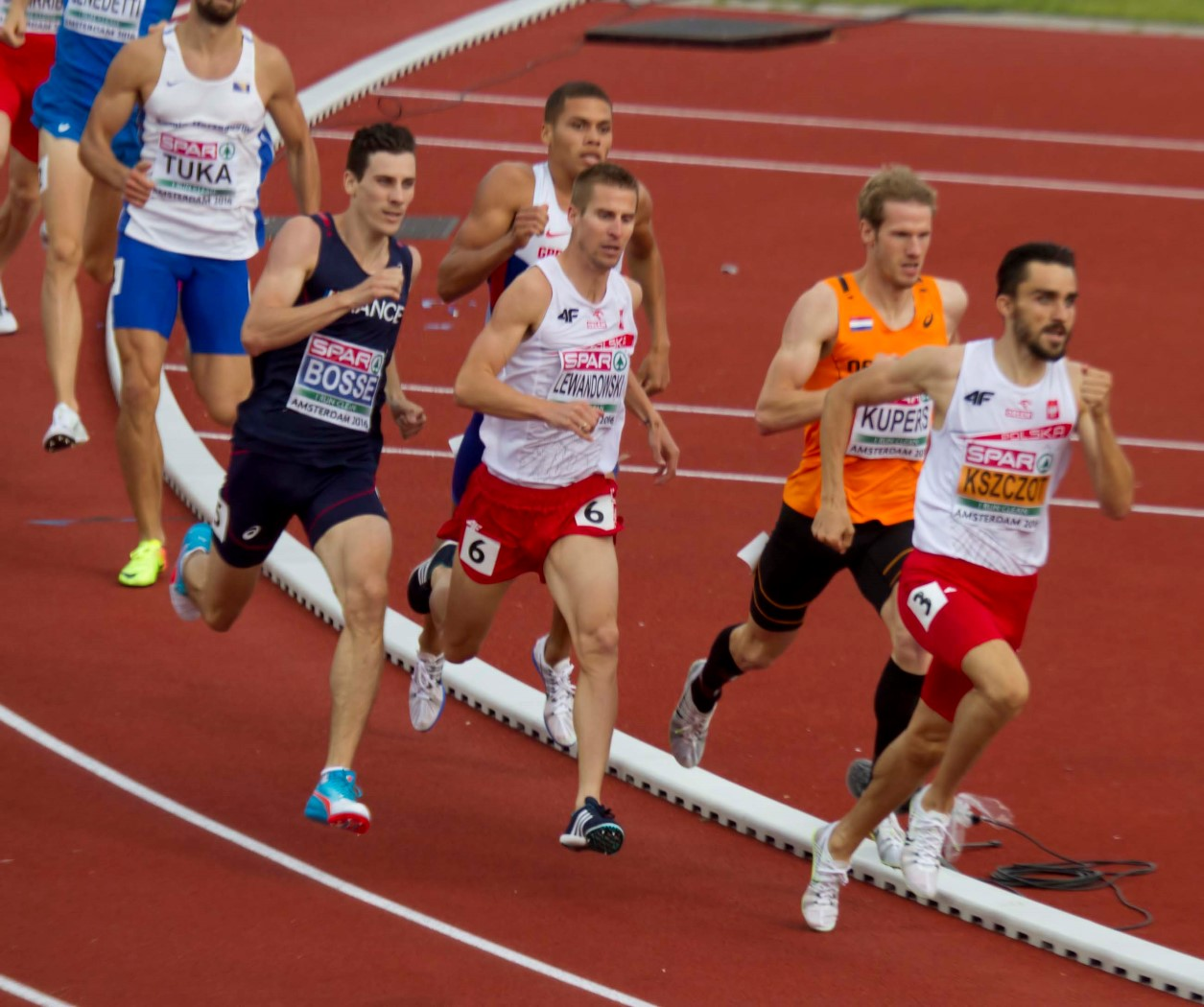
The final

Rank	Lane	Name	Nationality	Time	Note
1st place, gold medalist(s)	3	Adam Kszczot	Poland	1:45.18	
2nd place, silver medalist(s)	6	Marcin Lewandowski	Poland	1:45.54	
3rd place, bronze medalist(s)	1	Elliot Giles	Great Britain	1:45.54	PB
4	4	Amel Tuka	Bosnia and Herzegovina	1:45.74	
5	5	Pierre-Ambroise Bosse	France	1:45.79	
6	8	Thijmen Kupers	Netherlands	1:46.67	
7	7	Alvaro de Arriba	Spain	1:47.58	
8	2	Giordano Benedetti	Italy	1:47.64	
