= Sviatlana Siarova =

Belarusian discus thrower

Personal information
- Born: August 28, 1986 (age 39)
- Height: 1.78 m (5 ft 10 in)
- Weight: 92 kg (203 lb)

Sport
- Country: Belarus
- Sport: Athletics
- Event: Discus
- Updated on 14 August 2012

Sviatlana Viktarauna Siarova (Belarusian: Святлана Віктараўна Сярова; born 28 August 1986) is a Belarusian athlete. She competed for Belarus in discus at the 2012 Summer Olympics.
