= Adam Kszczot =

Polish middle-distance runner

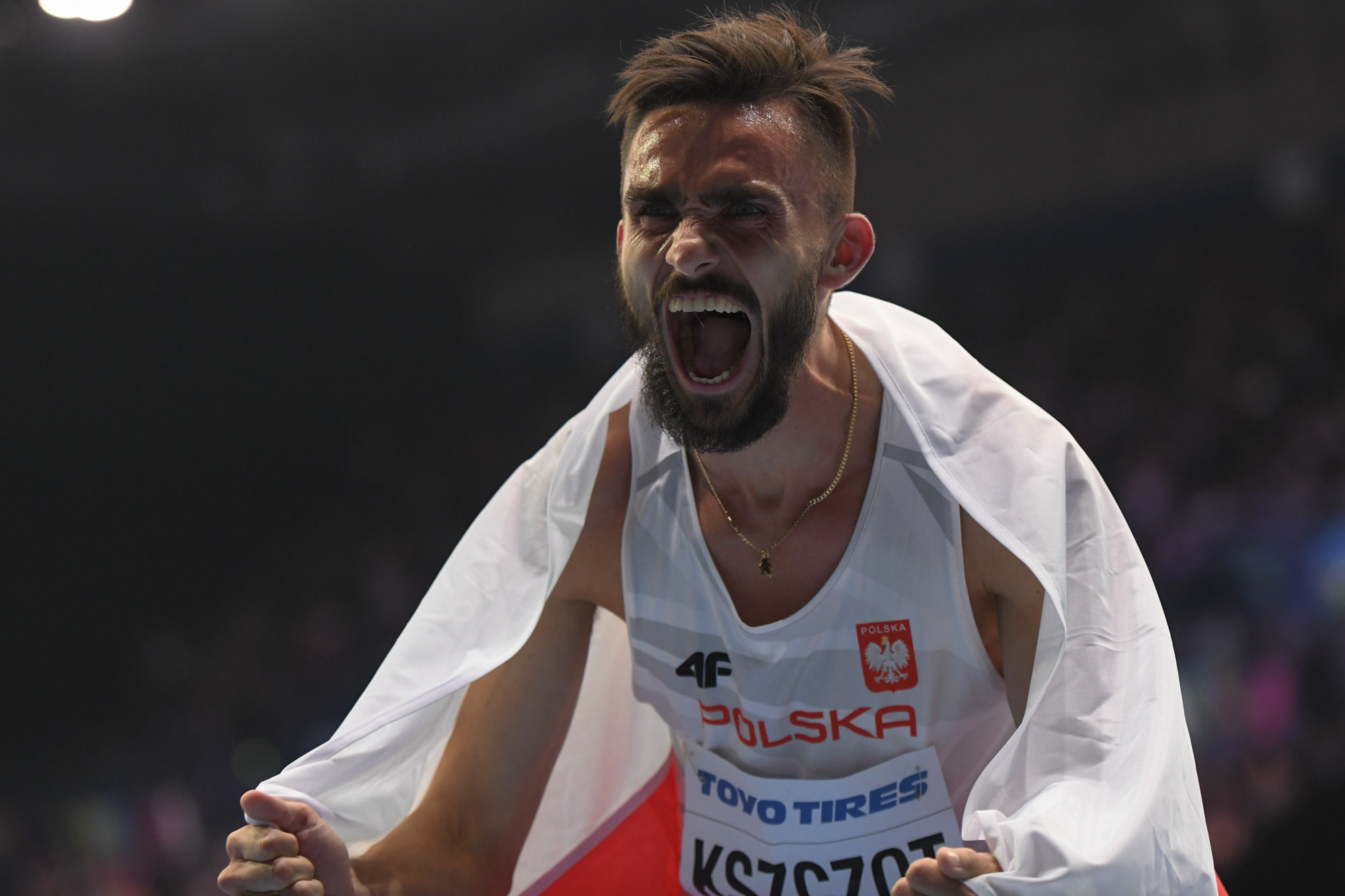
- Kszczot at the 2018 World Indoor Championships in Birmingham

Personal information
- Full name: Adam Piotr Kszczot
- Born: 2 September 1989 (age 37) Opoczno, Poland
- Height: 1.78 m (5 ft 10 in)
- Weight: 68 kg (150 lb)

Sport
- Sport: Athletics
- Event: 800 metres
- Club: RKS Łódź
- Coached by: Tomasz Lewandowski (2019–); Zbigniew Król (2012–2019); Stanisław Jaszczak (–2012)
- Retired: 2022

Achievements and titles
- Personal bests: 800 m: 1:43.30 (2011); Indoors; 800 m: 1:44.57i NR (2012)
Medal record
Men's athletics
Representing Poland
World Championships
Silver medal – second place	2015 Beijing	800 m
Silver medal – second place	2017 London	800 m
World Indoor Championships
Gold medal – first place	2018 Birmingham	800 m
Silver medal – second place	2014 Sopot	800 m
Bronze medal – third place	2010 Doha	800 m
World Relays
Silver medal – second place	2014 Nassau	4 × 800 m relay
Silver medal – second place	2015 Nassau	4 × 800 m relay
World Indoor Tour
First place	2016	800 m
First place	2018	800 m
European Championships
Gold medal – first place	2014 Zurich	800 m
Gold medal – first place	2016 Amsterdam	800 m
Gold medal – first place	2018 Berlin	800 m
Bronze medal – third place	2010 Barcelona	800 m
European Indoor Championships
Gold medal – first place	2011 Paris	800 m
Gold medal – first place	2013 Gothenburg	800 m
Gold medal – first place	2017 Belgrade	800 m
European Team Championships
Gold medal – first place	2011 Stockholm	800 m
Gold medal – first place	2013 Gateshead	800 m
Gold medal – first place	2019 Bydgoszcz	800 m
Silver medal – second place	2014 Braunschweig	800 m
Bronze medal – third place	2015 Cheboksary	800 m
European Athletics U23 Championships
Gold medal – first place	2009 Kaunas	800 m
Gold medal – first place	2011 Ostrava	800 m
European Junior Championships
Bronze medal – third place	2007 Hengelo	800 m

Adam Piotr Kszczot (pronounced [ˈadam ˈkʂt͡ʂɔt]; born 2 September 1989) is a Polish retired middle-distance runner who specialised in the 800 metres. His achievements include silver medals at the 2015 and 2017 World Championships in Athletics, gold at the 2018 World Indoor Championships as well as silver and bronze at the 2014 and 2010 World Indoor Championships respectively. Kszczot won three gold medals in the 800 m at both the European Outdoor and Indoor Championships. He twice competed at the Olympic Games, in 2012 and 2016, narrowly missing the final on both occasions.

Kszczot was the 800 m bronze medallist at the 2007 European Under-20 Championships. He took gold medals at both the 2009 and 2011 European U23 Championships. He is the Polish indoor record holder for the 800 metres. Kszczot won 13 individual national titles (indoors and out, including two 1500 metres titles).

== Personal life ==
Adam Kszczot was born and raised in Opoczno by his parents, mother Ewa - a former mathematics teacher and father Stanisław Kszczot, a carpenter. He has two sisters, Agata and Ewa. His older brother Jacek died at age 17 as a result of electric shock during agricultural work. He graduated from the Lodz University of Technology in Management. In October 2014 he married Renata (née Borkowska). In October 2017 his wife gave birth to their son named Ignacy.

== Career ==
Kszczot reached the international level after competing in local and then national events. He won the bronze medal at the 2007 European Junior Championships, finished fourth at the 2008 World Junior Championships and won the 2009 European U23 Championships. He finished fourth at the 2009 European Indoor Championships and competed at the 2009 World Championships without reaching the final.

Kszczot won the bronze medal at the 2010 World Indoor Championships and the 2010 European Championships, as well as the gold at the 2011 European Indoor Championships. He reached the final at the 2011 World Championships, finishing sixth. His outdoor personal best is 1:43.30 minutes, achieved on 10 September 2011 in Rieti.

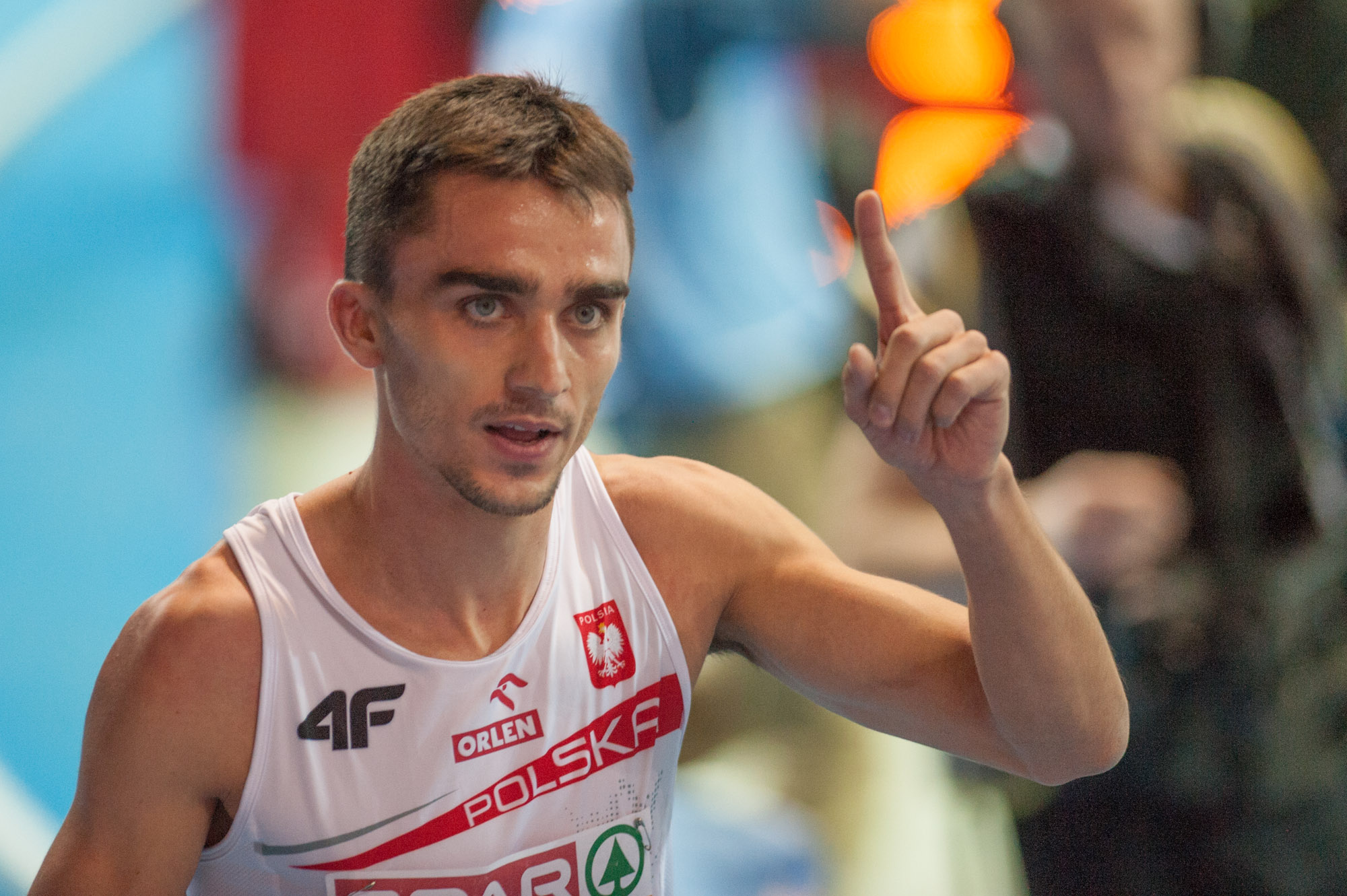
Kszczot at the 2013 European Indoor Championships in Gothenburg.

Kszczot broke Paweł Czapiewski's 10-year-old Polish indoor record at the 2012 Meeting Pas de Calais. His time of 1:44.57 made him the third fastest indoor runner ever after Wilson Kipketer and Yuriy Borzakovskiy. Vazel, Pierre-Jean (2012-02-15). With this result, Kszczot went to the 2012 World Indoor Championships as a medal favourite. However, he finished a disappointing fourth. In his Olympic debut in London he placed third in his semifinal round, failing to qualify for the final.

He started well in the 2013 season by successfully defending his title at the European Indoor Championships, the first man to do so in 42 years.

On 15 August 2014, he won the men's 800 m final at the 2014 European Athletics Championships with a time of 1:44:15 after a blistering last 100 m sprint.

In 2017, he won the bronze medal in the men's 4 × 800 metres relay at the 2017 IAAF World Relays held in Nassau, Bahamas. He won the silver medal in the 800 metres at the 2017 World Championships held in London.

On 3 March 2018, Kszczot claimed his first title of World Indoor Champion in the 800 meters. He controlled the final run, the pace of which was quite slow and won with a large advantage over American Drew Windle and Spanish Saúl Ordóñez. He dedicated his gold medal to his 5-month-old son Ignacy. In August, Kszczot added the European outdoor title at the event.

== Achievements ==
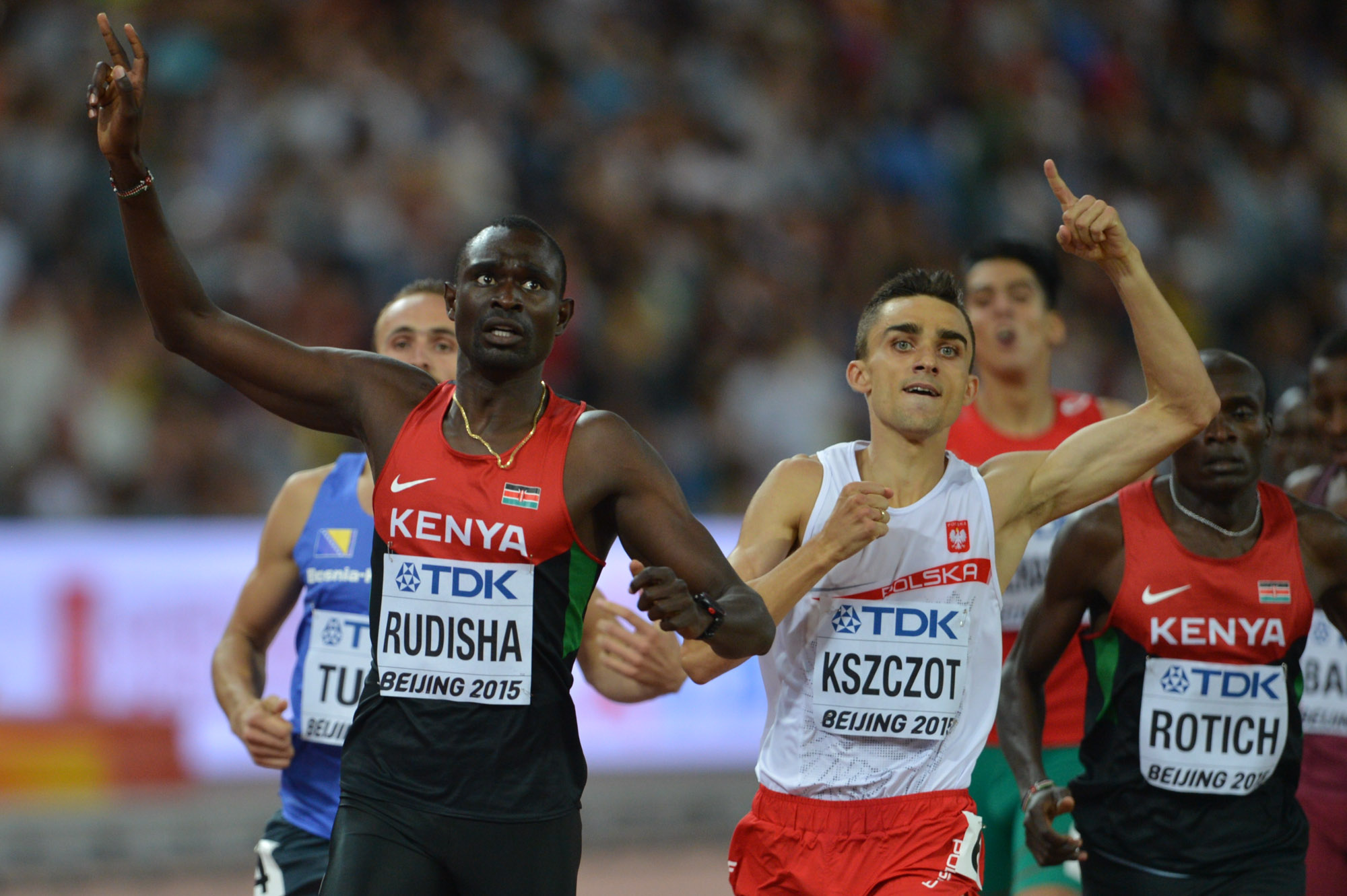
Kszczot (R) won the silver medal behind only world record holder David Rudisha (L) at the 2015 World Championships in Athletics in Beijing.

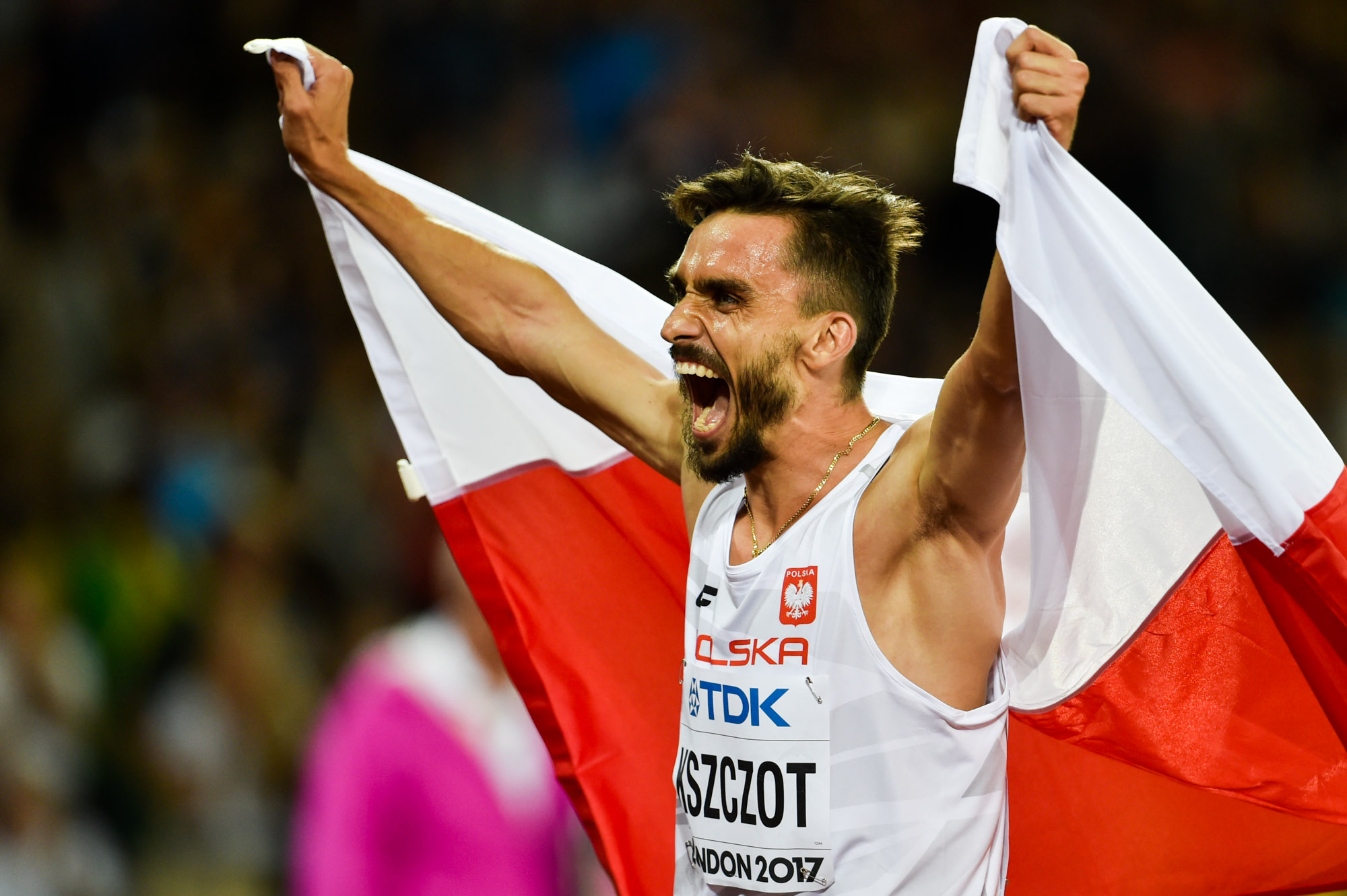
Adam Kszczot celebrates his silver at the 2017 World Championships in Athletics held in London.

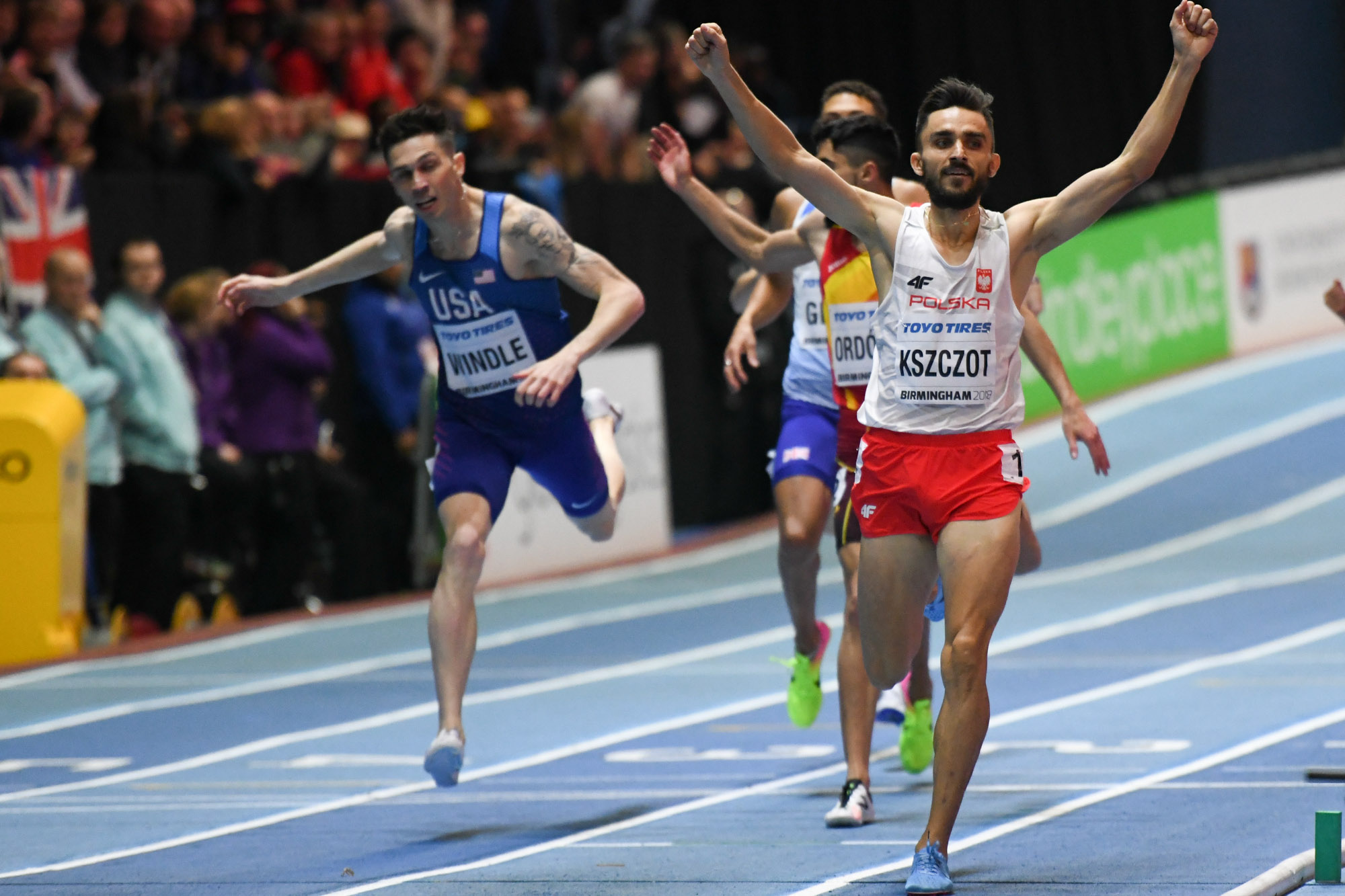
Kszczot took his first and only world title at the 2018 World Indoor Championships in Birmingham.

=== Personal bests ===
- 400 metres – 46.51 (Bydgoszcz 2011)
  - 400 metres indoor – 47.56 (Spała 2013)
- 800 metres – 1:43.30 (Rieti 2011)
  - 800 metres indoor – 1:44.57 (Liévin 2012) NR
- 1000 metres – 2:15.72 (Brussels 2014)
  - 1000 metres indoor – 2:19.14 (Val-de-Reuil 2022)
- 1500 metres – 3:38.31 (Białystok 2017)

=== International competitions ===
Representing Poland
Year	Competition	Venue	Position	Event	Time
2007	European Junior Championships	Hengelo, Netherlands	3rd	800 m	1:48.10
2008	World Junior Championships	Bydgoszcz, Poland	4th	800 m	1:47.91
2009	European Indoor Championships	Turin, Italy	4th	800 m	1:49.52
2009	European U23 Championships	Kaunas, Lithuania	1st	800 m	1:45.81
2009	World Championships	Berlin, Germany	14th (sf)	800 m	1:46.33
2010	World Indoor Championships	Doha, Qatar	3rd	800 m	1:46.69
2010	European Championships	Barcelona, Spain	3rd	800 m	1:47.22
2011	European Indoor Championships	Paris, France	1st	800 m	1:47.87
2011	European U23 Championships	Ostrava, Czech Republic	1st	800 m	1:46.71
2011	World Championships	Daegu, South Korea	6th	800 m	1:45.25
2012	World Indoor Championships	Istanbul, Turkey	4th	800 m	1:49.16
2012	Olympic Games	London, United Kingdom	12th (sf)	800 m	1:45.34
2013	European Indoor Championships	Gothenburg, Sweden	1st	800 m	1:48.69
2013	World Championships	Moscow, Russia	12th (sf)	800 m	1:45.68
2014	World Indoor Championships	Sopot, Poland	2nd	800 m	1:46.76
2014	World Relays	Nassau, Bahamas	2nd	4 × 800 m relay	7:08.69
2014	World Relays	Nassau, Bahamas	6th	Distance medley relay	15:05.70
2014	European Championships	Zurich, Switzerland	1st	800 m	1:44.15
2015	World Relays	Nassau, Bahamas	2nd	4 × 800 m relay	7:09.98
2015	World Relays	Nassau, Bahamas	4th	Distance medley relay	9:24.07 AR
2015	World Championships	Beijing, China	2nd	800 m	1:46.08
2016	European Championships	Amsterdam, Netherlands	1st	800 m	1:45.18
2016	Olympic Games	Rio de Janeiro, Brazil	9th (sf)	800 m	1:44.70
2017	European Indoor Championships	Belgrade, Serbia	1st	800 m	1:48.87
2017	World Relays	Nassau, Bahamas	3rd	4 × 800 m relay	7:18.74
2017	World Championships	London, United Kingdom	2nd	800 m	1:44.95
2018	World Indoor Championships	Birmingham, United Kingdom	1st	800 m	1:47.47
2018	Athletics World Cup	London, United Kingdom	2nd	800 m	1:46.98
2018	European Championships	Berlin, Germany	1st	800 m	1:44.59
2019	World Championships	Doha, Qatar	9th (sf)	800 m	1:45.22
2021	European Indoor Championships	Toruń, Poland	4th	800 m	1:47.23

=== Circuit wins, National titles ===
- Diamond League

800 metres wins, other events specified in parentheses

- 2012: London
- 2014: Stockholm, Brussels (1000 m)
- 2015: Zurich, Brussels
- 2016: Brussels
- 2017: Rome

- Polish Athletics Championships
  - 800 metres: 2009, 2010, 2012, 2014, 2015
  - 1500 metres: 2017, 2018
  - 4 × 400 m relay: 2020
- Polish Indoor Athletics Championships
  - 800 metres: 2009, 2010, 2011, 2014, 2017, 2018
