= Mario Scapini =

Italian middle-distance runner

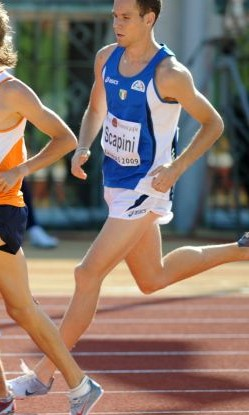

Personal information
- Nationality: Italian
- Born: 2 February 1989 (age 37) Milan
- Height: 1.88 m (6 ft 2 in)
- Weight: 65 kg (143 lb)

Sport
- Country: Italy
- Sport: Athletics
- Event(s): 800 metres 1500 metres
- Club: Pro Patria Milano
- Coached by: Giorgio Rondelli; Gianni Ghidini

Achievements and titles
- Personal bests: 800 m: 1:46.95 (2012); 1500 m: 3:44.06 (2009)
Medal record
European U20 Championships
| Gold medal – first place | 2007 Hengelo | 1500 m |

Mario Scapini (born 2 February 1989) is a former Italian male middle-distance runner, who at the age of 23, after winning three Italian championships and taking part in a World championship and a European championship, was forced to permanently stop his career as a sportsman due to stomach cancer.

== Biography ==
During his youth career he won the gold medal at the European Athletics U20 Championships in 2007.

== Achievements ==
| Year | Competition | Venue | Position | Event | Time | Notes |
|---|---|---|---|---|---|---|
| 2010 | World Indoor Championships | (Qatar) Doha | Heats | 800 m | 1:50.74 | |
| 2010 | European Championships | (Spain) Barcelona | SF (12th) | 800 m | 1:49.13 | |

== National titles ==
- Italian Athletics Championships
  - 800 metres: 2009
  - 1500 metres: 2009
- Italian Athletics Indoor Championships
  - 1500 metres: 2010
