= Anis Ananenka =

Belarusian middle-distance runner

Anis Viktaravich Ananenka (Belarusian: Аніс Ананенка; born 29 November 1985, in Zhlobin) is a Belarusian middle-distance runner. At the 2012 Summer Olympics, he competed in the Men's 800 metres.

== Doping ==
In July 2015 Ananenka was banned from sport for 4 years after testing positive for the black market drug GW1516. The ban ended 15 June 2019.

In March 2019 he was disqualified from the 2012 Summer Olympics after the re-analysis of his samples. Ananenka tested positive for oralturinabol.

== Competition record ==
Year	Competition	Venue	Position	Event	Notes
Representing Belarus
2010	European Indoor Championships	Barcelona, Spain	9th (sf)	800 m	1:48.41
2011	European Indoor Championships	Paris, France	15th (h)	800 m	1:51.10
2011	Universiade	Shenzhen, China	20th (sf)	800 m	1:49.53
2012	Olympic Games	London, United Kingdom	DSQ	800 m	DSQ
2013	European Indoor Championships	Gothenburg, Sweden	4th	800 m	1:49.61
2013	World Championships	Moscow, Russia	27th (h)	800 m	1:47.76
