= Lukas Rifesser =

Italian middle-distance runner

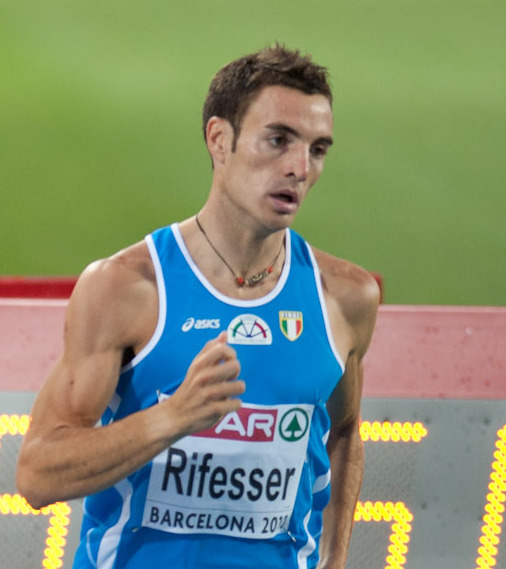

Personal information
- Nationality: Italian
- Born: 17 July 1986 (age 39) Bruneck, Italy

Sport
- Sport: Track and field
- Event(s): 800 m & 1500 m

Achievements and titles
- Personal best(s): 800 m: 1:45.88 (2009); 800 m (indoor): 1:47.74 (2009); 1500 m: 3:41.02 (2011)

Lukas Rifesser (born 17 July 1986) is an Italian middle-distance runner. He has won the Italian Athletics Championships twice, once in the 800 metres (2010) and once in the 1500 metres (2008). Rifesser has also competed in the World Youth Championships, World Championships and the World Indoor Championships. He represented his country at the 2010 European Athletics Championships.

== International Competitions ==
Year	Competition	Venue	Position	Event	Notes
Representing Italy
2003	World Youth Championships	Sherbrooke, Canada	28th (ht)	800 m	1:55.74
2005	European Athletics Junior Championships	Kaunas, Lithuania	2nd	800 m	1:50.79
2007	European Athletics U23 Championships	Debrecen, Hungary	6th (ht)	800 m	1:48.21
2008	World Indoor Championships	Valencia, Spain	18th (sf)	800 m	1:51.20
2009	European Athletics Indoor Championships	Turin, Italy	5th (sf)	800 m	1:49.80
2009	World Championships	Berlin, Germany	18th (ht)	800 m	1:47.07
2010	European Athletics Championships	Barcelona, Spain	16th (sf)	800 m	1:49.75

== Personal bests ==
Outdoor
Event	Time	Date	Location
800 metres	1:45.88	25 July 2009	Pergine Valsugana, Italy
1500 metres	3:41.02	10 June 2011	Turin, Italy

Indoor
Event	Time	Date	Location
800 metres	1:47.74	3 February 2009	Vienna, Austria
