= Mattias Claesson =

Swedish middle-distance runner

Medal record

Representing Sweden

Men's athletics

European Indoor Championships
Bronze medal – third place	2009 Torino	800 m

Mattias Claesson (born 26 July 1986) is a Swedish male middle-distance runner who specializes in the 800 metres.

He finished fourth in the 4 × 400 metres relay at the 2006 IAAF World Indoor Championships, with teammates Joni Jaako, Johan Wissman and Andreas Mokdasi. In the 800 metres' distance he won the 2005 European Junior Championships and finished fifth at the 2007 European Athletics Indoor Championships.

His personal best time is 1:46.46 minutes, achieved in June 2006 in Karlskrona.
