= Andreas Rapatz =

Austrian middle-distance runner

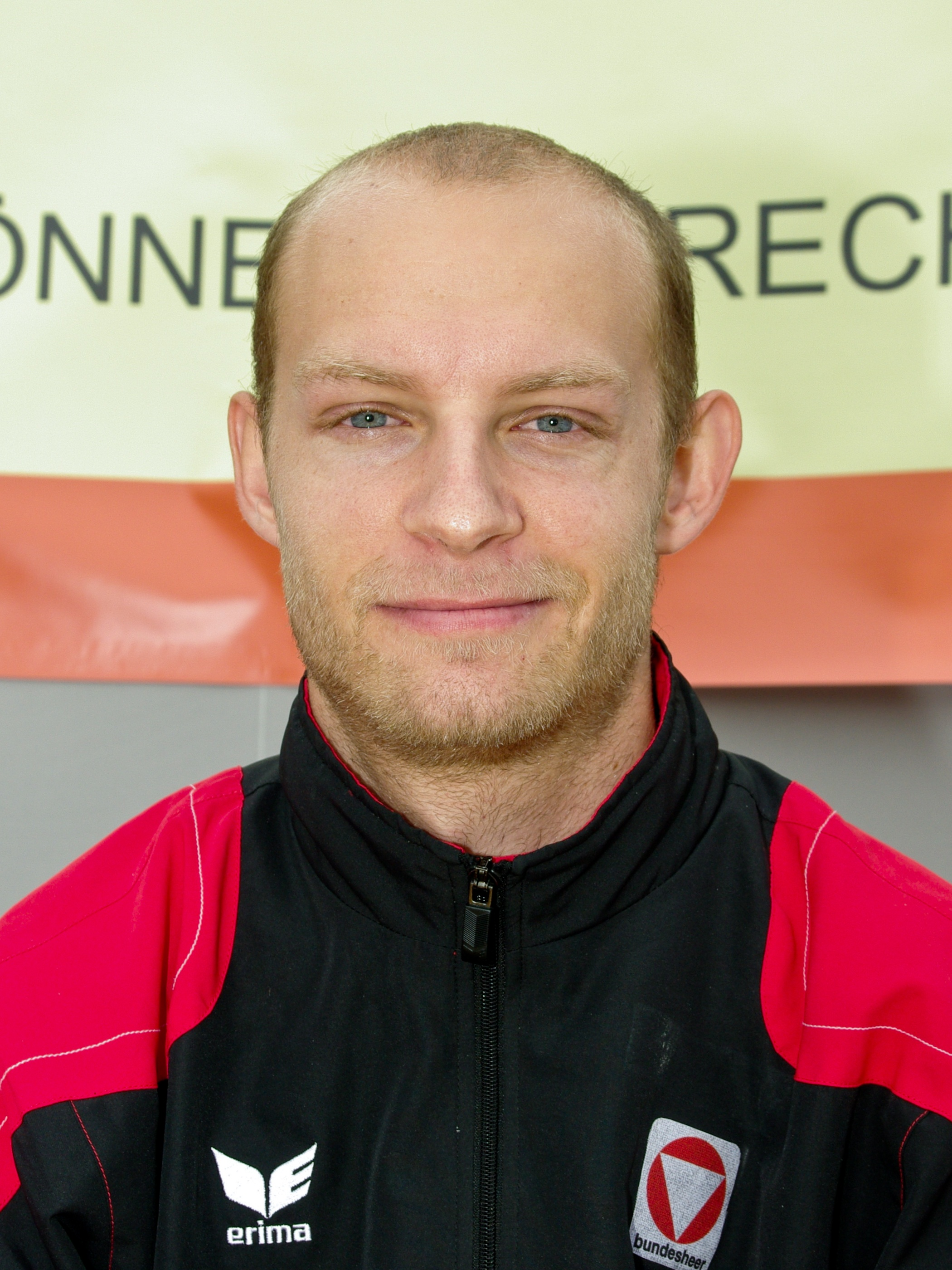
Andreas Rapatz (September 2010)

Andreas Rapatz (born 5 September 1986) is an Austrian runner who specializes in the 800 metres.

He was born in Klagenfurt. He competed at the 2007 European Indoor Championships, the 2009 European Indoor Championships and the 2010 World Indoor Championships without reaching the final.

His personal best time is 1:47.93 minutes (indoor), achieved in February 2010 in Vienna.

Trainer: Dr. Eduard Holzer
