= Athletics at the 2016 Summer Olympics – Men's 800 metres =

Men's 800 metres at the Games of the XXXI Olympiad
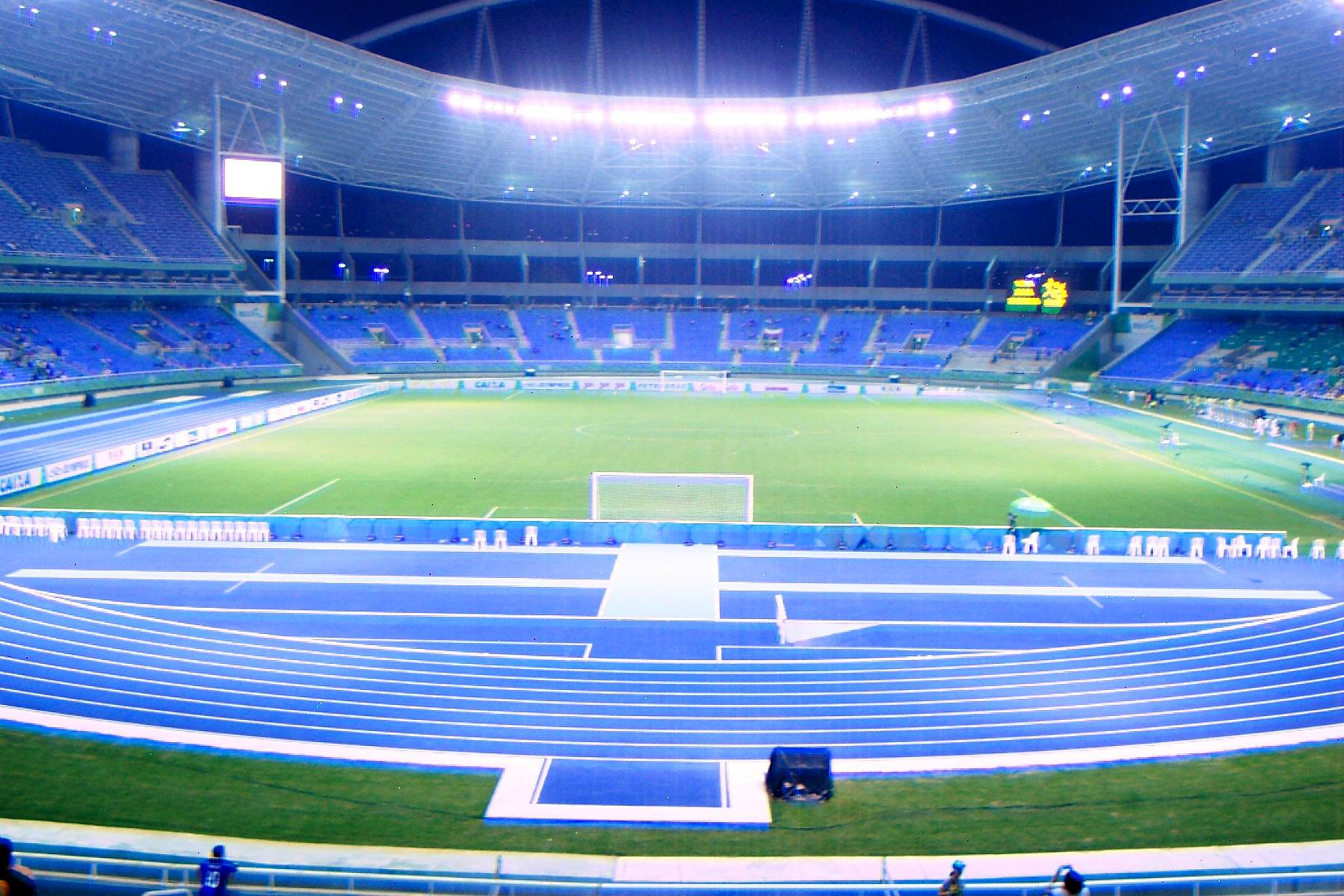
- Interior view of the Estádio Olímpico João Havelange, where the Men's 800m took place.
- Venue: Olympic Stadium
- Dates: 12 August 2016 (heats); 13 August 2016 (semifinals); 15 August 2016 (final)
- Competitors: 58 from 39 nations
- Winning time: 1:42.15

Medalists
1st place, gold medalist(s)		David Rudisha	Kenya
2nd place, silver medalist(s)		Taoufik Makhloufi	Algeria
3rd place, bronze medalist(s)		Clayton Murphy	United States

Official Video Highlights

The men's 800 metres event at the 2016 Summer Olympics took place between 12–15 August at the Olympic Stadium. Fifty-eight athletes from 39 nations competed. The event was won by 0.46 seconds by David Rudisha of Kenya, the fourth man to successfully defend Olympic gold in the 800 metres. Taoufik Makhloufi of Algeria took silver, the first medal for the nation in the 800 metres since 2000. The United States had an even longer medal-less streak broken, as Clayton Murphy's bronze was their first since 1992.

== Background ==
This was the 28th appearance of the event, which is one of 12 athletics events to have been held at every Summer Olympics. The top two men from 2012, gold medalist David Rudisha of Kenya and silver medalist Nijel Amos of Botswana, returned along with sixth-place finisher Mohammed Aman of Ethiopia. Rudisha entered the competition as the reigning 2012 Olympic champion and the 2015 World Champion. He also held the season's fastest time at 1:43.35 minutes. His principal challengers included Kenyans Alfred Kipketer and Ferguson Rotich, the African champion Amos, and Olympic 1500 metres champion Taoufik Makhloufi.

Djibouti, Kosovo, Slovenia, and the Refugee Olympic Team appeared in the event for the first time. Great Britain made its 27th appearance, most among all nations, having had no competitors in the event only in the 1904 Games in St. Louis.

== Summary ==
In the first round, Amos was a surprise elimination, faring poorly at the end of a slow, tactical race. The semi-finals saw the elimination of world #1 Amel Tuka who has not shown evidence of his finishing kick this year, and world championship silver medalist Adam Kszczot. Frenchman Pierre-Ambroise Bosse and Algerian Makhloufi shared the semi-final's leading time of 1:43.85 in the first semi-final, with Rudisha just three hundredths slower. Kipketer won the third semi-final.

In the final, Kenyan trials winner Kipketer took the lead, closing off Rudisha's challenge after the break. Kipketer took the 200 in 23.2 and continued to lead at 400 in 49.3 but Rudisha was just a step behind. Through the turn, Rudisha went around Kipketer and accelerated down the backstretch. The next chaser was Bosse, in position to challenge at the 600 metres in 1:16.1, but most of the field was really in contention, within about a second. Through the final turn, Rudisha established separation, with Bosse the last to fall off. Taoufik Makhloufi tracked Bosse through the turn and sped by as they hit the straightaway. Makhloufi took off in chase of Rudisha but was too far back to make any headway. Clayton Murphy came from sixth place to sprint past Bosse to take the bronze.

While it was "only" Rudisha's eleventh best performance, only four other men have ever run faster. It was also Rudisha's best race since 2012. Makhloufi set the national record for Algeria and became the seventeenth fastest man in history. Murphy became #31 and the #3 American in history. Rudisha joined Douglas Lowe, Mal Whitfield and Peter Snell in defending the Olympic 800 metres championship, the first to accomplish the feat in over 50 years.

== Qualification ==
A National Olympic Committee (NOC) could enter up to 3 qualified athletes in the men's 800 metres event if all athletes meet the entry standard during the qualifying period. (The limit of 3 has been in place since the 1930 Olympic Congress.) The qualifying standard was 1:46.00. The qualifying period was from 1 May 2015 to 11 July 2016. The qualifying time standards could be obtained in various meets during the given period that have the approval of the IAAF. Indoor and outdoor meets were accepted. NOCs could also use their universality place—each NOC could enter one male athlete regardless of time if they had no male athletes meeting the entry standard for an athletics event—in the 800 metres.

== Competition format ==
The men's 800 metres used a three-round format, the most common format since 1912 though there had been variations. The "fastest loser" system introduced in 1964 was used for the first two rounds. There were seven first-round heats, each with 8 or 9 athletes; the top three runners in each heat as well as the next three fastest overall advanced to the semifinals. There were three semifinals with 8 athletes each; the top two runners in each semifinal and the next two fastest overall advanced to the eight-man final.

== Records ==
Prior to this competition, the existing world and Olympic records were as follows.

World record	David Rudisha (KEN)	1:40.91	London, United Kingdom	9 August 2012
Olympic record	David Rudisha (KEN)	1:40.91	London, United Kingdom	9 August 2012
World Leading	David Rudisha (KEN)	1:43.35	Székesfehérvár, Hungary	18 July 2016

Area
Area	Time (s)	Athlete	Nation
Africa (records)	1:40.91 WR	David Rudisha	Kenya
Asia (records)	1:42.79	Yusuf Saad Kamel	Bahrain
Europe (records)	1:41.11	Wilson Kipketer	Denmark
North, Central America and Caribbean (records)	1:42.60	Johnny Gray	United States
Oceania (records)	1.44.21	Joseph Deng	Australia
South America (records)	1:41.77	Joaquim Cruz	Brazil

The following national record was established during the competition:

Country	Athlete	Round	Time	Notes
Algeria	Taoufik Makhloufi (ALG)	Final	1:42.61	

== Schedule ==
All times are Brasília Time (UTC−3).

Date	Time	Round
Friday, 12 August 2016	10:10	Heats
Saturday, 13 August 2016	22:08	Semifinals
Monday, 15 August 2016	22:25	Finals

== Results ==
=== Round 1 ===
Qualification rule: First 3 in each heat (Q) and the next 3 fastest (q) advance to the Semifinals.

==== Heat 1 ====
Rank	Athlete	Nation	Time	Notes
1	Ayanleh Souleiman	Djibouti	1:45.48	Q
2	Amel Tuka	Bosnia and Herzegovina	1:45.72	Q
3	Boris Berian	United States	1:45.87	Q
4	Kléberson Davide	Brazil	1:46.14	q
5	Žan Rudolf	Slovenia	1:46.93	SB
6	Antoine Gakeme	Burundi	1:47.46	
7	Musa Hajdari	Kosovo	1:48.41	
—	Abraham Rotich	Bahrain	DQ	R163.3a

==== Heat 2 ====
Rank	Athlete	Nation	Time	Notes
1	Adam Kszczot	Poland	1:45.83	Q
2	Ferguson Cheruiyot Rotich	Kenya	1:46.00	Q
3	Andrés Arroyo	Puerto Rico	1:46.17	Q
4	Hamada Mohamed	Egypt	1:46.65	q
5	Rafith Rodríguez	Colombia	1:46.65	SB
6	Boitumelo Masilo	Botswana	1:48.48	
7	Luke Mathews	Australia	1:50.17	
8	Brice Etès	Monaco	1:50.40	

==== Heat 3 ====
Rank	Athlete	Nation	Time	Notes
1	David Rudisha	Kenya	1:45.09	Q
2	Reinhardt van Rensburg	South Africa	1:45.67	Q, SB
3	Michael Rimmer	Great Britain	1:45.99	Q
4	Clayton Murphy	United States	1:46.18	q
5	Jinson Johnson	India	1:47.27	
6	Anthony Romaniw	Canada	1:47.59	
7	Lutimar Paes	Brazil	1:48.38	
8	Benjamín Enzema	Equatorial Guinea	1:52.14	
9	Alex Beddoes	Cook Islands	1:52.76	PB

==== Heat 4 ====
Rank	Athlete	Nation	Time	Notes
1	Alfred Kipketer	Kenya	1:46.61	Q
2	Andreas Bube	Denmark	1:46.67	Q
3	Yassine Hathat	Algeria	1:46.81	Q
4	Álvaro de Arriba	Spain	1:46.86	
5	Wesley Vázquez	Puerto Rico	1:46.96	
6	Charles Jock	United States	1:47.06	
7	Elliot Giles	Great Britain	1:47.88	
8	Yiech Biel	Refugee Olympic Team	1:54.67	
—	Joshua Ilustre	Guam	DQ	R163.3a

==== Heat 5 ====
Rank	Athlete	Nation	Time	Notes
1	Taoufik Makhloufi	Algeria	1:49.17	Q
2	Mostafa Smaili	Morocco	1:49.29	Q
3	Giordano Benedetti	Italy	1:49.40	Q
4	Sho Kawamoto	Japan	1:49.41	
5	Jacob Rozani	South Africa	1:49.79	
6	Jozef Repčík	Slovakia	1:49.95	
7	Nijel Amos	Botswana	1:50.46	
8	Kevin López	Spain	1:53.41	

==== Heat 6 ====
Rank	Athlete	Nation	Time	Notes
1	Brandon McBride	Canada	1:45.99	Q
2	Marcin Lewandowski	Poland	1:46.35	Q
3	Mark English	Ireland	1:46.40	Q
4	Jeff Riseley	Australia	1:46.93	
5	Abubaker Haydar Abdalla	Qatar	1:47.81	
6	Pol Moya	Andorra	1:48.88	
7	Alex Amankwah	Ghana	1:50.33	
—	Abdelati El Guesse	Morocco	DNF	

==== Heat 7 ====
Rank	Athlete	Nation	Time	Notes
1	Pierre-Ambroise Bosse	France	1:48.12	Q
2	Mohammed Aman	Ethiopia	1:48.33	Q
3	Amine Belferar	Algeria	1:48.40	Q
4	Daniel Andújar	Spain	1:48.50	
5	Charles Grethen	Luxembourg	1:48.93	
6	Peter Bol	Australia	1:49.36	
7	Francky-Edgard Mbotto	Central African Republic	1:52.97	
—	Musaeb Abdulrahman Balla	Qatar	DNS	

=== Semifinals ===
Qualification rule: First 2 in each heat (Q) and the next 2 fastest (q) advance to the Final.

==== Semifinal 1 ====
Rank	Athlete	Nation	Time	Notes
1	Pierre-Ambroise Bosse	France	1:43.85	Q, SB
2	Taoufik Makhloufi	Algeria	1:43.85	Q, SB
3	Marcin Lewandowski	Poland	1:44.56	q, SB
4	Ferguson Cheruiyot Rotich	Kenya	1:44.65	q
5	Mostafa Smaili	Morocco	1:45.78	
6	Kléberson Davide	Brazil	1:46.19	
7	Andrés Arroyo	Puerto Rico	1:46.74	
8	Michael Rimmer	Great Britain	1:46.80	

==== Semifinal 2 ====
Rank	Athlete	Nation	Time	Notes
1	Alfred Kipketer	Kenya	1:44.38	Q
2	Boris Berian	United States	1:44.56	Q
3	Yassine Hathat	Algeria	1:44.81	PB
4	Amel Tuka	Bosnia and Herzegovina	1:45.24	
5	Reinhardt van Rensburg	South Africa	1:45.33	PB
6	Brandon McBride	Canada	1:45.41	
7	Andreas Bube	Denmark	1:45.87	SB
8	Mohammed Aman	Ethiopia	1:46.14	

==== Semifinal 3 ====
Rank	Athlete	Nation	Time	Notes
1	David Rudisha	Kenya	1:43.88	Q
2	Clayton Murphy	United States	1:44.30	Q, PB
3	Adam Kszczot	Poland	1:44.70	
4	Ayanleh Souleiman	Djibouti	1:45.19	
5	Mark English	Ireland	1:45.93	
6	Giordano Benedetti	Italy	1:46.41	SB
7	Amine Belferar	Algeria	1:46.55	
8	Hamada Mohamed	Egypt	1:48.17	

=== Final ===
Rank	Athlete	Nation	Time	Notes
1st place, gold medalist(s)	David Rudisha	Kenya	1:42.15	SB
2nd place, silver medalist(s)	Taoufik Makhloufi	Algeria	1:42.61	NR
3rd place, bronze medalist(s)	Clayton Murphy	United States	1:42.93	PB
4	Pierre-Ambroise Bosse	France	1:43.41	SB
5	Ferguson Cheruiyot Rotich	Kenya	1:43.55	SB
6	Marcin Lewandowski	Poland	1:44.20	SB
7	Alfred Kipketer	Kenya	1:46.02	
8	Boris Berian	United States	1:46.15	
