= Jan Kubista =

Jan Kubista may refer to:

- Jan Kubista (born 1960), Czechoslovak middle-distance runner
- Jan Kubista (born 1990), Czech middle-distance runner
