= 2013 European Athletics Indoor Championships – Men's 800 metres =

The men's 800 metres event at the 2013 European Athletics Indoor Championships was held at March 1, 2013 at 18:35 (round 1), March 2, 16:55 (semi-final) and March 3, 11:30 (final) local time.

== Records ==
Standing records prior to the 2013 European Athletics Indoor Championships
| World record | Wilson Kipketer (DEN) | 1:42.67 | Paris, France | 9 March 1997 |
| European record | Wilson Kipketer (DEN) | 1:42.67 | Paris, France | 9 March 1997 |
| Championship record | Paweł Czapiewski (POL) | 1:44.78 | Vienna, Austria | 3 March 2002 |
| World Leading | Mohammed Aman (ETH) | 1:45.05 | Stockholm, Sweden | 21 February 2013 |
| European Leading | Michael Rimmer (GBR) | 1:46.55 | Birmingham, Great Britain | 16 February 2013 |

== Results ==
=== Round 1 ===
Qualification: First 2 (Q) or and the 2 fastest athletes (q) advanced to the semifinal.

| Rank | Heat | Athlete | Nationality | Time | Note |
|---|---|---|---|---|---|
| 1 | 5 | Adam Kszczot | Poland | 1:48.69 | Q |
| 2 | 5 | Jozef Repčík | Slovakia | 1:48.88 | Q |
| 3 | 5 | Francisco Roldán | Spain | 1:49.10 | q |
| 4 | 1 | Mukhtar Mohammed | Great Britain | 1:49.43 | Q |
| 5 | 1 | Johan Rogestedt | Sweden | 1:49.46 | Q |
| 6 | 1 | Ivan Nesterov | Russia | 1:49.78 | q |
| 7 | 5 | Halit Kiliç | Turkey | 1:49.85 | SB |
| 8 | 1 | Andreas Rapatz | Austria | 1:50.11 | |
| 9 | 4 | Anis Ananenka | Belarus | 1:50.49 | Q |
| 10 | 3 | Luis Alberto Marco | Spain | 1:50.75 | Q |
| 11 | 3 | Thijmen Kupers | Netherlands | 1:50.78 | Q |
| 12 | 4 | Taras Bybyk | Ukraine | 1:50.81 | Q |
| 13 | 4 | Michael Rimmer | Great Britain | 1:51.04 | |
| 14 | 3 | Žan Rudolf | Slovenia | 1:51.06 | |
| 15 | 5 | Nikolaus Franzmair | Austria | 1:51.10 | |
| 16 | 2 | Joe Thomas | Great Britain | 1:51.11 | Q |
| 17 | 2 | Kevin López | Spain | 1:51.52 | Q |
| 18 | 2 | Tamás Kazi | Hungary | 1:51.77 | |
| 19 | 4 | Andreas Bube | Denmark | 1:51.88 | |
| 20 | 2 | Jan Kubista | Czech Republic | 1:52.21 | |
| 21 | 2 | Ådne Svahn Dæhlin | Norway | 1:52.49 | SB |
| 22 | 3 | Brice Leroy | France | 1:53.12 | |
| 23 | 4 | Giordano Benedetti | Italy | 1:53.44 | |
| 24 | 3 | Renārs Stepiņš | Latvia | 1:53.73 | |
| 25 | 2 | Abdulgani Tuna | Turkey | 1:54.84 | |
| 26 | 3 | Eraldo Qerama | Albania | 1:55.10 | |
| | 1 | Robert Lathouwers | Netherlands | DQ | |
| | 5 | Brice Etes | Monaco | DQ | |

=== Semi-final ===
Qualification: First 3 (Q) advanced to the final.

| Rank | Heat | Athlete | Nationality | Time | Note |
|---|---|---|---|---|---|
| 1 | 1 | Kevin López | Spain | 1:48.56 | Q |
| 2 | 1 | Anis Ananenka | Belarus | 1:48.77 | Q |
| 3 | 1 | Adam Kszczot | Poland | 1:48.78 | Q |
| 4 | 1 | Joe Thomas | Great Britain | 1:49.14 | |
| 5 | 2 | Mukhtar Mohammed | Great Britain | 1:49.89 | Q |
| 6 | 2 | Taras Bybyk | Ukraine | 1:49.92 | Q |
| 7 | 2 | Luis Alberto Marco | Spain | 1:49.96 | Q |
| 8 | 2 | Francisco Roldán | Spain | 1:50.27 | |
| 9 | 2 | Jozef Repčík | Slovakia | 1:50.28 | |
| 10 | 2 | Thijmen Kupers | Netherlands | 1:50.29 | |
| 11 | 1 | Ivan Nesterov | Russia | 1:50.53 | |
| 12 | 1 | Johan Rogestedt | Sweden | 1:55.98 | |

=== Final ===
The final was held at 11:30.

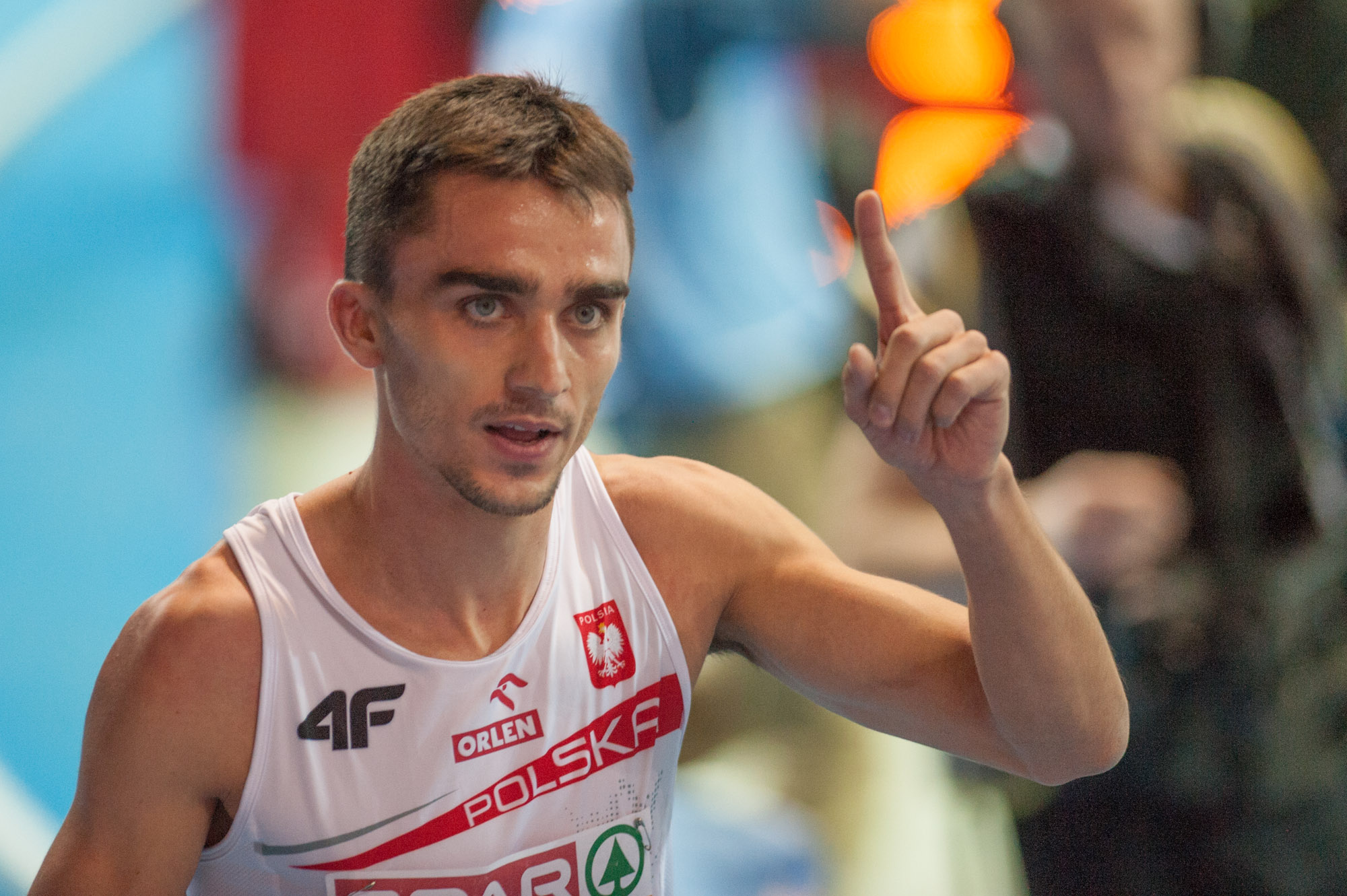
Adam Kszczot, the winner of the event.

| Rank | Lane | Athlete | Nationality | Time | Note |
|---|---|---|---|---|---|
| 1st place, gold medalist(s) | 5 | Adam Kszczot | Poland | 1:48.69 | |
| 2nd place, silver medalist(s) | 4 | Kevin López | Spain | 1:49.31 | |
| 3rd place, bronze medalist(s) | 6 | Mukhtar Mohammed | Great Britain | 1:49.60 | |
| 4 | 2 | Anis Ananenka | Belarus | 1:49.61 | |
| 5 | 1 | Taras Bybyk | Ukraine | 1:50.38 | |
| 6 | 3 | Luis Alberto Marco | Spain | 1:51.69 | |
