= 2015 European Athletics Indoor Championships – Men's 800 metres =

The men's 800 metres event at the 2015 European Athletics Indoor Championships was held on 6 March at 12:41 (heats), on 7 March at 18:25 (semifinals) and on 8 March at 15:30 (final) local time. Marcin Lewandowski won the race.

== Medalists ==
Gold	Silver	Bronze
Marcin Lewandowski; Poland	Mark English; Ireland	Thijmen Kupers; Netherlands

== Results ==
=== Heats ===
Qualification: First 2 of each heat (Q) and the next 4 fastest (q) qualified for the semifinals.

Rank	Heat	Athlete	Nationality	Time	Note
1	1	Mark English	Ireland	1:48.10	Q
2	1	Thijmen Kupers	Netherlands	1:48.19	Q
3	1	David Palacio	Spain	1:48.33	q
4	2	Marcin Lewandowski	Poland	1:48.56	Q
5	2	Stepan Poistogov	Russia	1:48.70	Q
6	1	Andreas Roth	Norway	1:49.09	q
6	2	Brice Leroy	France	1:49.09	q
8	3	Kevin López	Spain	1:49.38	Q
8	5	Guy Learmonth	Great Britain	1:49.38	Q
10	2	Matěj Pavlíček	Czech Republic	1:49.43	q
11	4	Robin Schembera	Germany	1:49.55	Q
12	5	Jan Van Den Broeck	Belgium	1:49.57	Q
13	4	Paul Renaudie	France	1:49.61	Q
14	3	Nick Jensen	Denmark	1:49.64	Q, PB
15	6	Karol Konieczny	Poland	1:49.65	Q
16	6	Declan Murray	Ireland	1:49.69	Q
17	4	Thomas Roth	Norway	1:49.73	
18	3	Mukhtar Mohammed	Great Britain	1:49.75	
19	6	James Bowness	Great Britain	1:49.78	
20	1	Aleš Zver	Slovenia	1:49.89	
21	3	Amel Tuka	Bosnia and Herzegovina	1:49.92	
22	5	Luis Alberto Marco	Spain	1:50.01	
23	5	Žan Rudolf	Slovenia	1:50.08	
23	6	Raimond Valler	Estonia	1:50.08	PB
25	7	Jozef Repčík	Slovakia	1:50.24	Q
26	1	Andreas Kramer	Sweden	1:50.34	
27	7	Andreas Almgren	Sweden	1:50.61	Q
28	4	Pauls Arents	Latvia	1:50.62	
29	3	Roman Yarko	Ukraine	1:50.68	
30	7	Kamil Gurdak	Poland	1:50.76	
31	5	Kristaps Valters	Latvia	1:50.94	
32	4	Filip Sasínek	Czech Republic	1:51.08	
33	5	Miroslav Burian	Czech Republic	1:51.11	
34	3	Renars Stepinš	Latvia	1:51.20	
35	6	Lucijan Zalokar	Slovenia	1:51.35	
36	7	Theofanis Michaelas	Cyprus	1:51.45	
37	7	Vyacheslav Olishevskyy	Ukraine	1:51.48	
38	4	Brice Etès	Monaco	1:51.57	SB
39	2	Christos Demetriou	Cyprus	1:51.82	
40	6	Andreas Rapatz	Austria	2:19.36	

=== Semifinals ===
Qualification: First 2 of each semifinal (Q) qualified directly for the final.

Rank	Heat	Athlete	Nationality	Time	Note
1	2	Andreas Almgren	Sweden	1:47.24	Q
2	2	Thijmen Kupers	Netherlands	1:47.34	Q, SB
3	2	Kevin López	Spain	1:47.78	
4	2	Stepan Poistogov	Russia	1:47.84	SB
5	2	Declan Murray	Ireland	1:48.09	SB
6	3	Marcin Lewandowski	Poland	1:50.10	Q
7	1	Guy Learmonth	Great Britain	1:50.50	Q
8	1	Mark English	Ireland	1:50.54	Q
9	1	Brice Leroy	France	1:50.72	
10	1	Jozef Repčík	Slovakia	1:50.76	
11	1	Karol Konieczny	Poland	1:50.96	
12	3	Robin Schembera	Germany	1:51.07	Q
13	3	Jan Van Den Broeck	Belgium	1:51.09	
14	3	David Palacio	Spain	1:52.21	
15	3	Paul Renaudie	France	1:53.14	
16	1	Matěj Pavlíček	Czech Republic	1:53.18	
17	2	Nick Jensen	Denmark	1:54.04	
18	3	Andreas Roth	Norway	1:57.56	

=== Final ===
Rank	Athlete	Nationality	Time	Note
1st place, gold medalist(s)	Marcin Lewandowski	Poland	1:46.67	
2nd place, silver medalist(s)	Mark English	Ireland	1:47.20	
3rd place, bronze medalist(s)	Thijmen Kupers	Netherlands	1:47.25	SB
4	Andreas Almgren	Sweden	1:47.78	
5	Robin Schembera	Germany	1:47.83	
6	Guy Learmonth	Great Britain	1:47.84	
