= Poistogov =

Poistogov (masculine, Russian: Поистогов) or Poistogova (feminine, Russian: Поистогова) is a Russian surname. Notable people with the surname include:

- Ekaterina Poistogova (born 1991), Russian middle-distance runner, wife of Stepan
- Stepan Poistogov (born 1986), Russian middle-distance runner, husband of Ekaterina
