= 2011 European Athletics U23 Championships – Men's 800 metres =

The men's 800 metres at the 2011 European Athletics U23 Championships took place at the Městský stadion on 14 and 15 July.

== Medalists ==
Gold	Adam Kszczot; Poland (POL)
Silver	Kevin López; Spain (ESP)
Bronze	(United Kingdom) Mukhtar Mohammed; Great Britain (GBR)

== Schedule ==
Date	Time	Round
14 July 2011	16:55	Round 1
15 July 2011	16:55	Final

== Results ==
=== Round 1 ===
Qualification: First 2 in each heat (Q) and 2 best performers (q) advance to the Final.

Rank	Heat	Name	Nationality	Time	Notes
1	2	Kevin López	Spain	1:47.43	Q
2	2	Jan van der Broeck	Belgium	1:47.78	Q
3	2	Anthony Lieghio	Ireland	1:48.06	q, PB
4	3	Mukhtar Mohammed	Great Britain	1:48.20	Q
5	3	Paul Renaudie	France	1:48.20	Q
6	3	Giordano Benedetti	Italy	1:48.34	q
7	2	Oleh Kayafa	Ukraine	1:48.46	
8	3	Brice Leroy	France	1:48.70	
9	2	Patrick Schoenball	Germany	1:49.32	
10	3	Darren McBrearty	Ireland	1:49.34	
11	1	Adam Kszczot	Poland	1:49.43	Q
12	1	Mario Scapini	Italy	1:49.58	Q
13	1	Martin Bischoff	Germany	1:49.88	
14	1	Samir Dahmani	France	1:49.95	
15	1	Artem Kazban	Ukraine	1:50.87	
16	1	Francisco Roldán	Spain	1:51.25	
17	3	Johan Svensson	Sweden	1:51.77	
18	1	Theofanis Michaelas	Cyprus	1:52.93	
	2	Jan Kubista	Czech Republic	DNF	

=== Final ===
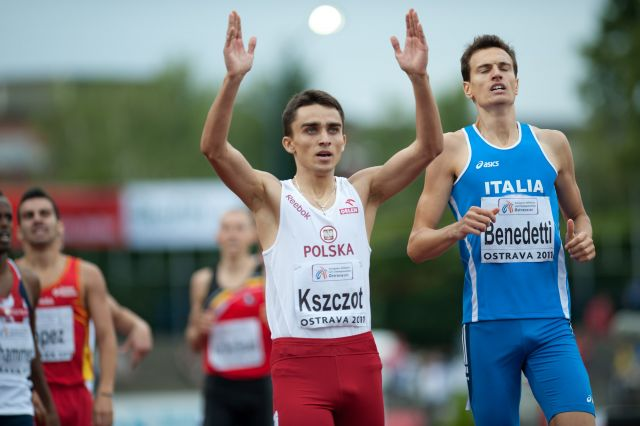
Adam Kszczot after winning the final

Rank	Name	Nationality	React	Time	Notes
1st place, gold medalist(s)	Adam Kszczot	Poland		1:46.71	
2nd place, silver medalist(s)	Kevin López	Spain		1:46.93	
3rd place, bronze medalist(s)	Mukhtar Mohammed	Great Britain		1:48.01	
4	Giordano Benedetti	Italy		1:48.05	SB
5	Mario Scapini	Italy		1:48.43	
6	Anthony Lieghio	Ireland		1:48.77	
7	Jan van der Broeck	Belgium		1:49.41	
8	Paul Renaudie	France		1:49.82	

== Participation ==
According to an unofficial count, 19 athletes from 12 countries participated in the event.

- Belgium (1)
- Cyprus (1)
- Czech Republic (1)
- France (3)
- Germany (2)
- Ireland (2)
- Italy (2)
- Poland (1)
- Spain (2)
- Sweden (1)
- Ukraine (2)
- United Kingdom (1)
