= 2008 World Junior Championships in Athletics – Men's 800 metres =

The men's 800 metres event at the 2008 World Junior Championships in Athletics was held in Bydgoszcz, Poland, at Zawisza Stadium on 8, 9 and 11 July.

== Medalists ==
Gold	Abubaker Kaki; Sudan
Silver	Geoffrey Kibet; Kenya
Bronze	André Olivier; South Africa

== Results ==
=== Final ===
11 July

Rank	Name	Nationality	Time	Notes
1st place, gold medalist(s)	Abubaker Kaki	Sudan	1:45.60	
2nd place, silver medalist(s)	Geoffrey Kibet	Kenya	1:46.23	
3rd place, bronze medalist(s)	André Olivier	South Africa	1:47.57	
4	Adam Kszczot	Poland	1:47.91	
5	Diomar de Souza	Brazil	1:49.80	
6	Giordano Benedetti	Italy	1:50.65	
7	Amine El-Manaoui	Morocco	1:51.43	
8	James Kaan	Australia	1:52.41	

=== Semifinals ===
9 July

==== Semifinal 1 ====
Rank	Name	Nationality	Time	Notes
1	Amine El-Manaoui	Morocco	1:48.90	Q
2	Geoffrey Kibet	Kenya	1:49.04	Q
3	James Kaan	Australia	1:49.25	q
4	Sebastian Keiner	Germany	1:49.99	
5	Shiferaw Wole	Ethiopia	1:50.11	
6	Rick Ward	United Kingdom	1:51.97	
7	Jan Van Den Broeck	Belgium	1:53.11	
8	Oriol Bonet	Spain	1:53.98	

==== Semifinal 2 ====
Rank	Name	Nationality	Time	Notes
1	Abubaker Kaki	Sudan	1:46.71	Q
2	Adam Kszczot	Poland	1:47.16	Q
3	Diomar de Souza	Brazil	1:49.01	q
4	Henok Tesfaye	Ethiopia	1:49.35	
4	Robin Rohlén	Sweden	1:49.35	
6	Elijah Greer	United States	1:50.47	
7	Felix Konchellah	Kenya	1:51.56	
8	Kevin López	Spain	1:53.57	

==== Semifinal 3 ====
Rank	Name	Nationality	Time	Notes
1	Giordano Benedetti	Italy	1:48.38	Q
2	André Olivier	South Africa	1:48.62	Q
3	Aleksandr Sheplyakov	Russia	1:49.39	
4	Ali Al-Deraan	Saudi Arabia	1:49.45	
5	Martin Hrstka	Czech Republic	1:50.07	
6	Ewen Sabatier	France	1:50.34	
7	Tayron Reyes	Dominican Republic	1:50.61	
8	Olivier Collin	Canada	1:51.60	

=== Heats ===
8 July

==== Heat 1 ====
Rank	Name	Nationality	Time	Notes
1	Abubaker Kaki	Sudan	1:50.92	Q
2	Shiferaw Wole	Ethiopia	1:50.96	Q
3	Martin Hrstka	Czech Republic	1:51.57	Q
4	Mohamed Saykouk	Morocco	1:51.82	
5	Johan Svensson	Sweden	1:52.64	
6	Bilal Gagui	Algeria	1:53.00	
7	Alessandro Schiavone	Switzerland	1:53.06	
8	Julio Alfonso Pérez	Peru	1:54.58	

==== Heat 2 ====
Rank	Name	Nationality	Time	Notes
1	Felix Konchellah	Kenya	1:51.72	Q
2	Rick Ward	United Kingdom	1:51.73	Q
3	Henok Tesfaye	Ethiopia	1:51.92	Q
4	Jost Kozan	Slovenia	1:52.31	
5	Benjamin Herriau	France	1:52.37	
6	Raaghid Fredericks	South Africa	1:52.60	
7	Cihat Ulus	Turkey	1:52.72	
8	Donte Holmes	United States	1:52.88	

==== Heat 3 ====
Rank	Name	Nationality	Time	Notes
1	Adam Kszczot	Poland	1:51.80	Q
2	Robin Rohlén	Sweden	1:52.04	Q
3	Sebastian Keiner	Germany	1:52.22	Q
4	Artyom Kazban	Ukraine	1:53.18	
5	Jerome Kahia	Belgium	1:53.30	
6	Chris Smith	United Kingdom	1:53.36	
7	Rafith Rodríguez	Colombia	1:53.72	
8	Garvyn Nero	Trinidad and Tobago	2:06.82	

==== Heat 4 ====
Rank	Name	Nationality	Time	Notes
1	Giordano Benedetti	Italy	1:49.71	Q
2	Jan Van Den Broeck	Belgium	1:49.72	Q
3	Diomar de Souza	Brazil	1:49.77	Q
4	Geoffrey Kibet	Kenya	1:49.81	q
5	Oriol Bonet	Spain	1:51.71	q
6	Dániel Kállay	Hungary	1:53.02	
7	Kim Jae-Yeol	South Korea	1:53.52	
8	Tilek Bekenbaev	Kyrgyzstan	1:59.87	

==== Heat 5 ====
Rank	Name	Nationality	Time	Notes
1	Amine El-Manaoui	Morocco	1:50.96	Q
2	Kevin López	Spain	1:51.08	Q
3	Ewen Sabatier	France	1:51.44	Q
4	André Olivier	South Africa	1:51.45	q
5	Ali Al-Deraan	Saudi Arabia	1:51.55	q
6	Ronny Heck	Germany	1:51.78	
7	Fábio Gonçalves	Portugal	1:52.61	
8	Emrah Çoban	Turkey	1:54.35	

==== Heat 6 ====
Rank	Name	Nationality	Time	Notes
1	Aleksandr Sheplyakov	Russia	1:50.16	Q
2	Tayron Reyes	Dominican Republic	1:50.18	Q
3	James Kaan	Australia	1:50.28	Q
4	Olivier Collin	Canada	1:50.42	q
5	Elijah Greer	United States	1:50.73	q
6	Wojciech Jarosz	Poland	1:52.30	
7	Farhan Ahmed	Pakistan	1:56.48	
8	Salifou Oumarou	Niger	1:56.77	

== Participation ==
According to an unofficial count, 48 athletes from 35 countries participated in the event.

- Algeria (1)
- Australia (1)
- Belgium (2)
- Brazil (1)
- Canada (1)
- Colombia (1)
- Czech Republic (1)
- Dominican Republic (1)
- Ethiopia (2)
- France (2)
- Germany (2)
- Hungary (1)
- Italy (1)
- Kenya (2)
- Kyrgyzstan (1)
- Morocco (2)
- Niger (1)
- Pakistan (1)
- Peru (1)
- Poland (2)
- Portugal (1)
- Russia (1)
- Saudi Arabia (1)
- Slovenia (1)
- South Africa (2)
- South Korea (1)
- Spain (2)
- Sudan (1)
- Sweden (2)
- Switzerland (1)
- Trinidad and Tobago (1)
- Turkey (2)
- Ukraine (1)
- United Kingdom (2)
- United States (2)
