= 2012 European Athletics Championships – Men's 800 metres =

Men's 800 metres at the European Athletics Championships

The men's 800 metres at the 2012 European Athletics Championships was held at the Helsinki Olympic Stadium on 27, 28 and 29 June.

== Medalists ==
Gold	Yuriy Borzakovskiy; Russia
Silver	Andreas Bube; Denmark
Bronze	Pierre-Ambroise Bosse; France

== Records ==
Standing records prior to the 2012 European Athletics Championships
World record	David Rudisha (KEN)	1.41.01	Rieti, Italy	29 August 2010
European record	Wilson Kipketer (DEN)	1:41.11	Köln, Germany	24 August 1997
Championship record	Olaf Beyer (GDR)	1:43.84	Prague, Czechoslovakia	31 August 1978
World Leading	David Rudisha (KEN)	1.41.74	New York City, United States	9 June 2012
European Leading	Adam Kszczot (POL)	1:43.83	Hengelo, Netherlands	27 May 2012

== Schedule ==
Date	Time	Round
27 June 2012	15:10	Round 1
28 June 2012	18:05	Semifinals
29 June 2012	19:40	Final

== Results ==
=== Round 1 ===
First 4 in each heat (Q) and 4 best performers (q) advance to the Semifinals.

Rank	Heat	Lane	Name	Nationality	Time	Note
1	1	1	Gareth Warburton	Great Britain	1:45.80	Q
2	1	6	Andreas Bube	Denmark	1:46.51	Q
3	1	5	Zan Rudolf	Slovenia	1:46.98	Q
4	3	6	Sören Ludolph	Germany	1:47.10	Q
5	3	4	Mukhtar Mohammed	Great Britain	1:47.13	Q
6	1	2	Ioan Zaizan	Romania	1:47.31	Q, SB
7	3	7	Jozef Repčík	Slovakia	1:47.41	Q
8	3	5	Luis Alberto Marco	Spain	1:47.42	Q
9	4	4	Yuriy Borzakovskiy	Russia	1:47.48	Q
10	1	8	Oleh Kayafa	Ukraine	1:47.56	q
11	4	8	Antonio Manuel Reina	Spain	1:47.61	Q
12	3	8	Jan Kubista	Czech Republic	1:47.66	q
13	1	4	Thijmen Kupers	Netherlands	1:47.69	q
14	4	3	Paul Renaudie	France	1:47.74	Q
15	4	5	Thomas Roth	Norway	1:47.78	Q
16	3	1	Ihor Davydov	Ukraine	1:47.79	q
17	5	2	Robert Lathouwers	Netherlands	1:48.00	Q
18	2	3	Sebastian Keiner	Germany	1:48.09	Q
19	4	6	Johan Svensson	Sweden	1:48.21	
20	2	1	Pierre-Ambroise Bosse	France	1:48.23	Q
21	2	4	Amel Tuka	Bosnia and Herzegovina	1:48.31	Q, PB
22	5	7	Jan van den Broeck	Belgium	1:48.35	Q
23	5	3	Hamid Oualich	France	1:48.44	Q
24	5	5	Kevin López	Spain	1:48.46	Q
25	2	5	Jakub Holuša	Czech Republic	1:48.54	Q
26	2	2	Dmitrijs Jurkevičs	Latvia	1:48.59	SB
27	5	8	Vitalij Kozlov	Lithuania	1:48.61	
28	5	6	Raphael Pallitsch	Austria	1:48.84	
29	3	3	Johan Rogestedt	Sweden	1:48.86	
30	4	7	Péter Szemeti	Hungary	1:49.13	
31	2	8	Ådne Svahn Dæhlin	Norway	1:49.34	
32	5	4	Andréas Dimitrákis	Greece	1:49.88	
33	3	2	Tommy Granlund	Finland	1:50.12	
34	2	6	Andreas Rapatz	Austria	1:51.79	
35	1	7	Charel Grethen	Luxembourg	1:53.22	
36	2	7	Dustin Emrani	Israel	1:58.69	
	1	3	Brice Etes	Monaco	DNF	
	4	2	Szymon Krawczyk	Poland	DQ	

=== Semifinals ===
First 2 in each heat (Q) and 2 best performers (q) advance to the Final.

Rank	Heat	Lane	Name	Nationality	Time	Note
1	1	6	Antonio Manuel Reina	Spain	1:46.49	Q
2	1	1	Jozef Repčík	Slovakia	1:46.62	Q, SB
3	1	4	Jakub Holuša	Czech Republic	1:46.63	q
4	2	4	Pierre-Ambroise Bosse	France	1:46.70	Q
5	1	2	Thomas Roth	Norway	1:46.88	q, PB
6	1	7	Sebastian Keiner	Germany	1:46.91	
7	2	3	Yuriy Borzakovskiy	Russia	1:46.92	Q
8	1	5	Hamid Oualich	France	1:47.14	
9	1	8	Ihor Davydov	Ukraine	1:47.22	
10	2	6	Kevin López	Spain	1:47.30	
11	1	3	Gareth Warburton	Great Britain	1:47.37	
12	2	8	Zan Rudolf	Slovenia	1:47.41	
13	2	5	Sören Ludolph	Germany	1:48.06	
14	3	5	Andreas Bube	Denmark	1:48.48	Q
15	3	6	Robert Lathouwers	Netherlands	1:48.49	Q
16	3	7	Mukhtar Mohammed	Great Britain	1:48.84	
17	2	2	Jan Kubista	Czech Republic	1:48.94	
18	3	3	Paul Renaudie	France	1:48.97	
19	3	4	Luis Alberto Marco	Spain	1:49.06	
20	2	1	Oleh Kayafa	Ukraine	1:49.61	
21	3	1	Ioan Zaizan	Romania	1:49.91	
22	2	7	Thijmen Kupers	Netherlands	1:50.37	
23	3	8	Jan van den Broeck	Belgium	1:50.63	
24	3	2	Amel Tuka	Bosnia and Herzegovina	1:51.14	

=== Final ===
Rank	Lane	Name	Nationality	Time	Note
1st place, gold medalist(s)	7	Yuriy Borzakovskiy	Russia	1:48.61	
2nd place, silver medalist(s)	6	Andreas Bube	Denmark	1:48.69	
3rd place, bronze medalist(s)	4	Pierre-Ambroise Bosse	France	1:48.83	
4	5	Antonio Manuel Reina	Spain	1:48.98	
5	8	Jakub Holuša	Czech Republic	1:48.99	
6	3	Robert Lathouwers	Netherlands	1:49.22	
7	1	Jozef Repčík	Slovakia	1:49.42	
8	2	Thomas Roth	Norway	1:49.54	
