= Theofanis Michaelas =

Cypriot middle-distance runner (born 1991)

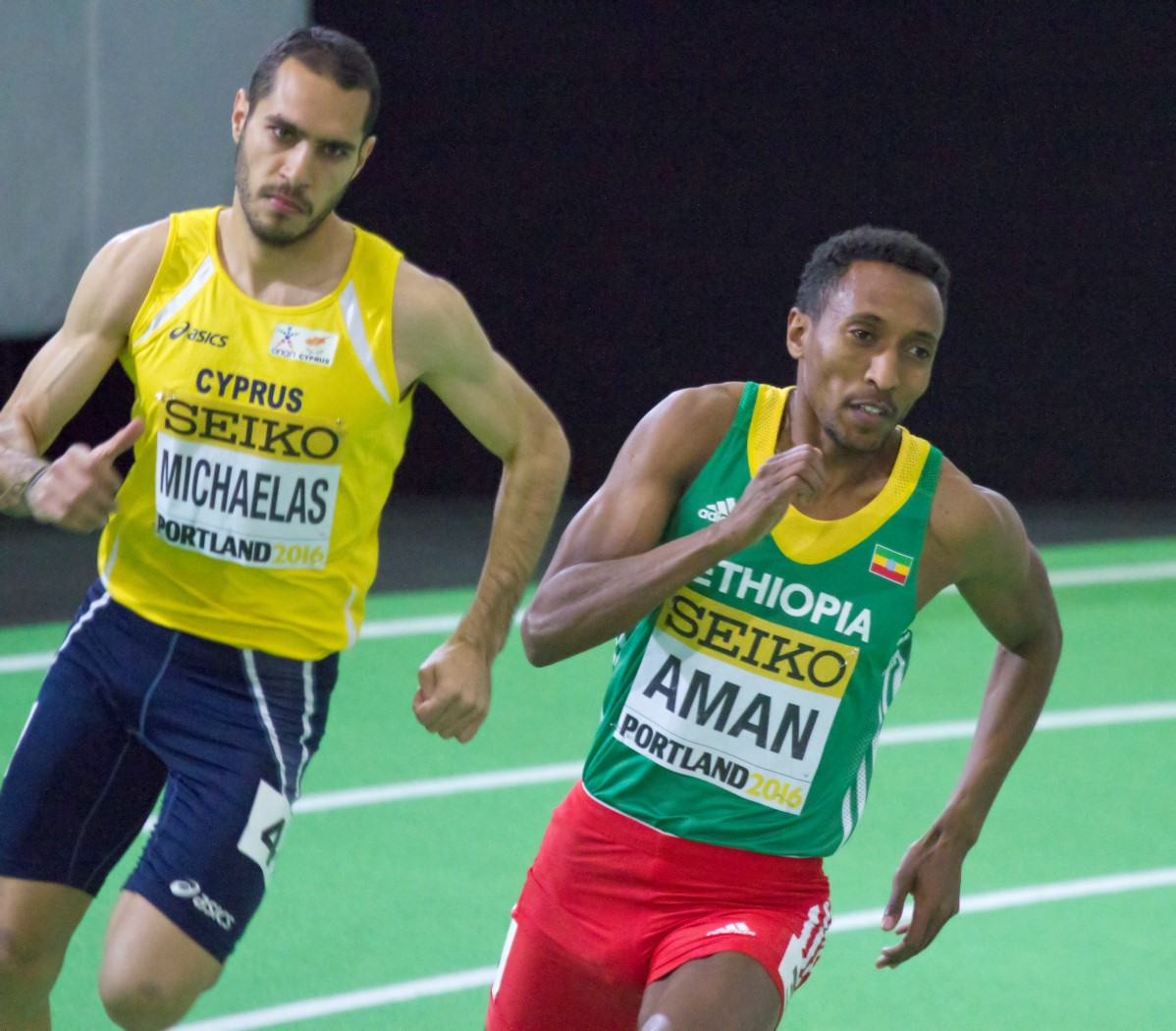
- Theofanis Michaelas and Mohammed Aman, Portland 2016

Personal information
- Born: 26 November 1991 (age 34)

Sport
- Sport: Track and field
- Event: 800 metres

Theofanis Michaelas (born 26 November 1991) is a Cypriot middle-distance runner specialising in the 800 metres. He competed at the 2016 IAAF World Indoor Championships without advancing to the final.

His personal bests in the event are 1:49.68 outdoors (Huizingen 2015) and 1:49.51 indoors (Vienna 2015).

== Competition record ==
Year	Competition	Venue	Position	Event	Notes
Representing Cyprus
2011	European U23 Championships	Ostrava, Czech Republic	18th (h)	800 m	1:52.93
2013	Games of the Small States of Europe	Luxembourg, Luxembourg	5th	800 m	1:57.00
2013	Games of the Small States of Europe	Luxembourg, Luxembourg	5th	1500 m	3:58.17
2015	European Indoor Championships	Prague, Czech Republic	36th (h)	800 m	1:51.45
2016	World Indoor Championships	Portland, United States	9th (h)	800 m	1:51.36
2017	Games of the Small States of Europe	Serravalle, San Marino	5th	800 m	1:52.33
2017	Games of the Small States of Europe	Serravalle, San Marino	3rd	1500 m	4:01.26
