= Jozef Repčík =

Slovak middle-distance runner

Personal information
- Nationality: Slovak
- Born: 3 August 1986 (age 39) Brezová pod Bradlom, Czechoslovakia
- Education: Slovak University of Agriculture
- Height: 1.90 m (6 ft 3 in)
- Weight: 72 kg (159 lb)

Sport
- Sport: Track and field
- Event: 800 metres
- Club: AK Spartak Dubnica
Medal record
Men's athletics
Representing Slovakia
European Games
Gold medal – first place	2015 Baku	Mixed team
Universiade
Silver medal – second place	2013 Kazan	800 metres
European Youth Summer Olympic Festival
Gold medal – first place	2003 Paris	800 metres

Jozef Repčík (born 3 August 1986 in Brezová pod Bradlom) is a former Slovak athlete specializing in the 800 metres. He competed at the 2008 Beijing Olympic Games without reaching the semifinals.

He won his first major international medal at the 2013 Summer Universiade where he finished second.

== Competition record ==
Year	Competition	Venue	Position	Event	Notes
Representing Slovakia
2003	World Youth Championships	Sherbrooke, Canada	13th (sf)	800 m	1:54.88
2003	European Youth Olympic Festival	Paris, France	1st	800 m	1:49.96
2004	World Junior Championships	Grosseto, Italy	12th (sf)	800 m	1:50.79
2005	European Junior Championships	Kaunas, Lithuania	7th	800 m	1:52.84
2006	European Championships	Gothenburg, Sweden	16th (sf)	800 m	1:50.89
2007	European Indoor Championships	Birmingham, United Kingdom	15th (h)	800 m	1:56.04
2007	European U23 Championships	Debrecen, Hungary	5th	800 m	1:50.53
2007	Universiade	Bangkok, Thailand	5th	800 m	1:46.53
2007	World Championships	Osaka, Japan	33rd (h)	800 m	1:46.53
2008	World Indoor Championships	Valencia, Spain	11th (sf)	800 m	1:48.61
2008	Olympic Games	Beijing, China	46th (h)	800 m	1:48.64
2009	Universiade	Belgrade, Serbia	31st (h)	800 m	1:52.61
2009	World Championships	Berlin, Germany	42nd (h)	800 m	1:48.73
2010	European Championships	Barcelona, Spain	18th (h)	800 m	1:50.51
2012	European Championships	Helsinki, Finland	7th	800 m	1:49.42
2013	European Indoor Championships	Gothenburg, Sweden	9th (sf)	800 m	1:50.28
2013	Universiade	Kazan, Russia	2nd	800 m	1:47.30
2013	World Championships	Moscow, Russia	31st (h)	800 m	1:47.93
2013	Jeux de la Francophonie	Nice, France	4th	800 m	1:48.01
2014	IAAF World Relays	Nassau, Bahamas	8th	4 × 800 m	7:32.87
2014	European Championships	Zürich, Switzerland	7th	800 m	1:46.29
2015	European Indoor Championships	Prague, Czech Republic	10th (sf)	800 m	1:50.76
2015	World Championships	Beijing, China	28th (h)	800 m	1:48.26
2016	European Championships	Amsterdam, Netherlands	12th (h)	800 m	1:49.32
2016	Olympic Games	Rio de Janeiro, Brazil	45th (h)	800 m	1:49.95
2017	European Indoor Championships	Belgrade, Serbia	22nd (h)	800 m	1:52.62

== Personal bests ==
Outdoor

- 800 metres – 1:44.94 (Ostrava 2008)
- 1000 metres – 2:19.38 (Strasbourg 2008)
- 1500 metres – 3:41.99 (Prague 2017)

Indoor

- 400 metres – 48.76 (Bratislava 2006)
- 800 metres – 1:47.06 (Birmingham 2008)
- 1000 metres – 2:19.15 (Stockholm 2008)
- 1500 metres – 3:42.79 (Ostrava 2017)
