= Guy Learmonth =

Scottish and Great British athlete (born 1992)

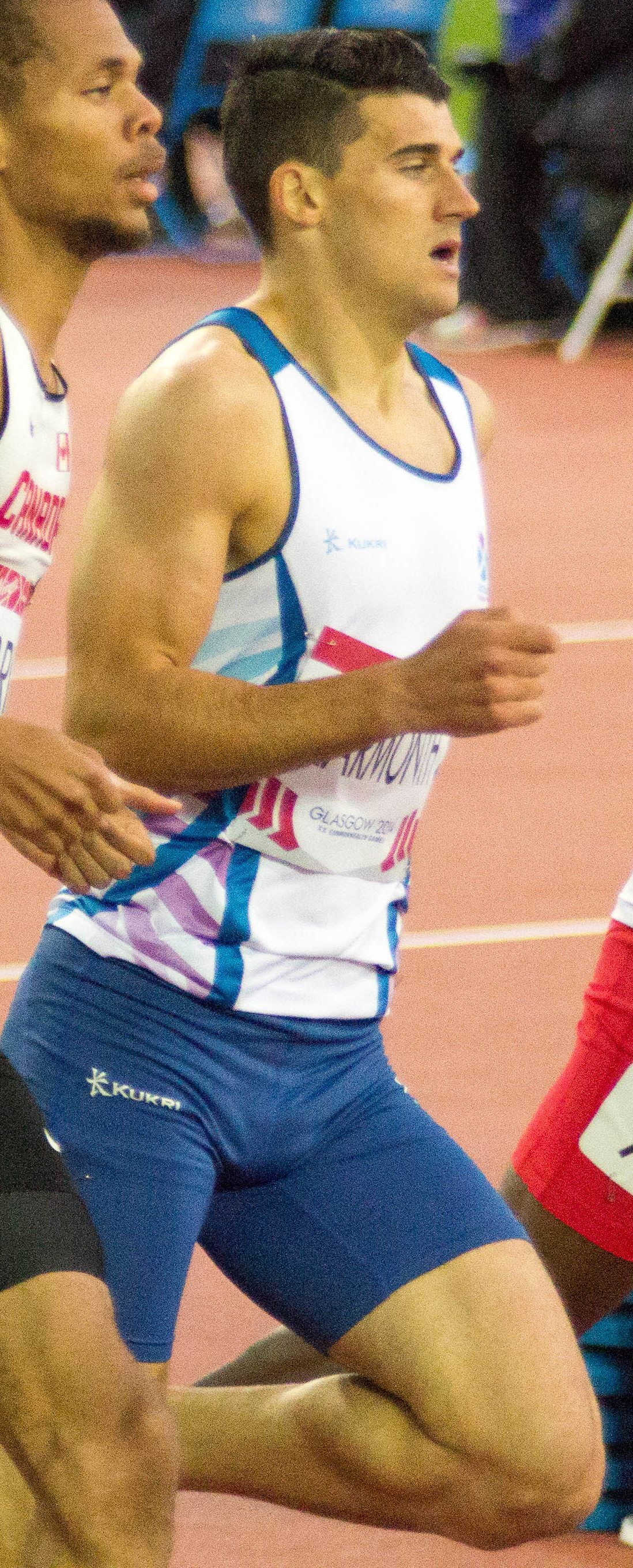
- Learmonth at the 2014 Commonwealth Games

Personal information
- Nationality: British
- Born: 20 April 1992 (age 34) Berwick-upon-Tweed, United Kingdom
- Height: 1.83 m (6 ft 0 in)
- Weight: 75 kg (165 lb)

Sport
- Sport: Athletics
- Event: 800 metres
- College team: Loughborough University
- Coached by: Henry Gray (2009-2019); Rob Denmark (2015-2016); George Gandy (2012-2014); Justin Rinaldi (2019-2024); Bruno Gajer (2024-present)

Guy Learmonth (born 20 April 1992 in Berwick-upon-Tweed) is a Scottish and Great British athlete specialising in the 800 metres. His personal best currently stands as 1:44.73 and he is the third fastest Scottish 800m athlete of all time. Learmonth reached the final at the 2014 Commonwealth Games, the 2015 European Indoor Championships and the 2022 World Athletics Indoor Championships, finishing sixth overall in all three. He was named the GB&NI captain for the European Indoor Championships in 2019 and also competed outdoors at the 2017 World Championships. He broke the Scottish 800m Junior Record 9 times, and holds the English AAA U20 Indoor & BUCS Championship records.

== Biography ==
From Berwick-upon-Tweed, he has two siblings Jack and Max. Learmonth attended Longridge Towers School. Before turning to athletics at age 17, Learmonth practised rugby for the Border Reivers. Learmonth holds a Sports Management degree from Loughborough University and in 2021 completed a Diploma in Egyptology (Distinction). He trained as a member of Lasswade AC and was coached by Henry Gray who came out of retirement to coach him when Learmonth was a teenager. His brother Jack later also acted as his coach, as did Rob Denmark.

== Athletics career ==
=== Early career: Commonwealth Games debut ===
Guy Learmonth's first major athletics competition was the 2011 European Athletics Junior Championships. He competed in the 800 metres event, winning his heat. In his semi-final, he finished fifth. He also competed at the BUCS Indoor Championships that year, winning the 800 metres by over a second and setting a new championships best performance. He won his first national senior medal in 2011, taking a bronze at the British Indoor Athletics Championships. It would be the first of 13 National Indoor medals.

In 2012, he competed at his first Diamond League meeting at the Bislett Games in Oslo, setting a new personal best in the 800 metres finishing second. He also retained his 800 metres title in 2012 at the BUCS Indoor Championships, winning by over a second, like the previous year. On his debut at the BUCS Outdoor Championships he won gold in the 800 metres, in a competition that took place at the Olympic Stadium. He improved on his result from the 2011 British Indoor Championships by winning a silver medal in 2012 championships in the 800 metres at the EIS Sheffield.

In 2013, he chose not to defend his 800 metres titles at either the indoor or outdoor BUCS Championships, and attempted the 1500 metres at the outdoor championships, the only times he raced over the distance that year. He won both his heat and his semi-final, but finished a tenth of a second outside the medals, in fourth place. He competed in the British Indoor Championships, winning a bronze medal.

In 2014, he moved back down to the 800 metres at the BUCS Indoor Championships, winning his third 800 metres title. He won the Indoor Glasgow International Match winning over a rarely run 600m race in a time of 1:16:48 and in the process broke the Scottish National 600m record which has been held for 40 years, at the same time, breaking the British U23 600m Indoor record and going to number 3 on the UK All Time rankings. Learmonth competed in the 2014 Commonwealth Games in Glasgow achieving 6th place in the 800 metres final with a personal best time of 1:46.69. He got there by qualifying from the heats, and securing the third automatic qualifying spot in his semi-final by two hundredths of a second. He was slated to also run the 4 x 400 metres relay at the Games, but left the team due to the death of his grandfather.

=== 2018-2021: Multiple UK Indoor titles, World Championship debut ===
In 2015, Learmonth was crowned British Indoor Champion in the 800 metres. He also won both his heat and semi-final of the 800 metres before going on to finish sixth in the final at the European Indoor Championships in Prague, Czech Republic.

In 2016, he won a bronze medal, coming third at the British Indoor Championships in the 800 metres. Similarly, in 2017 Learmonth was crowned British Indoor Champion, and competed at the 2017 European Athletics Indoor Championships. He also won a silver medal in the British Outdoor Championships. Shortly after, Learmonth competed in the London Anniversary Games where he achieved a lifetime beat of 1:45.77 and the qualifying standard for the London World Championships in August 2017 where he reached the semi-final.

In 2018, he set his lifetime best over the 800m with a time of 1:44.73 at the London Diamond League to place third on the Scottish all-time lists behind Tom McKean and Jake Wightman. In 2019, he began to train under Australia based coach Justin Rinaldi. At the 2019 Indoor European Championships, Glasgow, Learmonth was named GB & NI Team Captain and qualified for the semi-finals of the 800 metres but had a fall during his semi-final and was unable to reach the final. The following year, he won his third British Indoor Championships title.

=== 2022-present: Third Commonwealth Games, fourth British Indoor title ===
Runner-up to Elliot Giles at the 2022 Indoor Championships, he was selected for the 2022 World Athletics Indoor Championships in Belgrade. In 2022, Learmonth also made his third consecutive Scottish team at the 2022 Commonwealth Games in Birmingham, England, where he finished sixth in the final.

In February 2023, he ran an indoor personal best of 1:46.36 in Germany, 0.10 seconds behind Tom McKean's longstanding 1:46.26 Scottish Record, set before Learmonth’a birth. His fourth British Indoor Championships title came in 2023, ahead of the 2023 European Athletics Indoor Championships in Istanbul, Turkey where he finished sixth in the final of the 800 metres.

In February 2024, he was runner-up by 0.001 seconds in the 800 metres to Jack Higgins at the 2024 British Indoor Athletics Championships in Birmingham. He qualified via his world ranking to compete at the subsequent World Indoor Championships in Glasgow but was not selected, with British Athletics choosing not to send an athlete in his event. Learmonth publicly criticised the decision. In 2024, Learmonth moved to train with Bruno Gajer in France, the coach of his girlfriend and fellow runner Renelle Lamote, and split with his long time coach Justin Rinaldi. However, a succession of injuries prevented a full 2025 season. He returned to racing at the Glasgow EAP in February 2026.

== Competition record ==
Year	Competition	Venue	Position	Event	Notes
Representing Great Britain and Scotland
2011	European Junior Championships	Tallinn, Estonia	13th (sf)	800 m	1:51.72
2014	Commonwealth Games	Glasgow, United Kingdom	6th	800 m	1:46.69
2015	European Indoor Championships	Prague, Czech Republic	6th	800 m	1:47.84
2017	European Indoor Championships	Belgrade, Serbia	9th (h)	800 m	1:48.73
2017	World Championships	London, United Kingdom	19th (sf)	800 m	1:46.75
2018	Commonwealth Games	Gold Coast, Australia	17th (h)	800 m	1:49.20
2018	European Championships	Berlin, Germany	11th (sf)	800 m	1:46.83
2019	European Indoor Championships	Glasgow, United Kingdom	14th (h)	800 m	1:48.98^{1}
2021	European Indoor Championships	Toruń, Poland	8th (sf)	800 m	1:47.92
2022	World Indoor Championships	Belgrade, Serbia	14th (h)	800 m	1:49.13
2022	World Indoor Championships	Belgrade, Serbia	6th	4 × 400 m relay	3:08.30
2023	European Indoor Championships	Istanbul, Turkey	6th	800 m	1:48.46

^{1}Did not finish in the semifinals

== Personal bests ==
Outdoor

- 400 metres – 48.00 (Glasgow 2012)
- 600 metres – 1:16.70 (Amsterdam 2015)
- 800 metres – 1:44.73 (London 2018)
- 1500 metres – 3:45.40 (Bedford 2013)

Indoor

- 600 metres – 1:16.48 (Glasgow 2014)
- 800 metres – 1:47.00 (Birmingham 2017)
