= Mohammed Darwish =

Mohammed Darwish may refer to:

- Muhammad Ismail Darwish, Palestinian politician
- Mohammed Darweesh (born 1991), Palestinian footballer
- Mohamed Darwish (born 1997), Palestinian footballer
- Mohamed Abbas Darwish (born 1986), Emirati triple jumper
