= 2017 European Athletics Indoor Championships – Men's 800 metres =

The men's 800 metres event at the 2017 European Athletics Indoor Championships was held on 3 March 2017 at 11:35 (heats), on 4 March at 19:25 (semifinals) and on 5 March 17:50 (final) local time.

== Medalists ==
Gold	Silver	Bronze
Adam Kszczot; Poland	Andreas Bube; Denmark	Álvaro de Arriba; Spain

== Records ==
Standing records prior to the 2017 European Athletics Indoor Championships
World record	Wilson Kipketer (DEN)	1:42.67	Paris, France	9 March 1997
European record	Wilson Kipketer (DEN)	1:42.67	Paris, France	9 March 1997
Championship record	Paweł Czapiewski (POL)	1:44.78	Vienna, Austria	3 March 2002
World Leading	Casimir Loxsom (USA)	1:46.13	Birmingham, United Kingdom	18 February 2017
European Leading	Adam Kszczot (POL)	1:46.17	Düsseldorf, Germany	1 February 2017

== Results ==
=== Heats ===
Qualification: First 2 in each heat (Q) and the next 4 fastest (q) advance to the Semifinal.

Rank	Heat	Athlete	Nationality	Time	Note
1	1	Andreas Kramer	Sweden	1:46.86	Q, PB
2	1	Thijmen Kupers	Netherlands	1:47.21	Q, SB
3	1	Daniel Andújar	Spain	1:47.32	q
4	1	Robert Farken	Germany	1:48.06	q
5	4	Adam Kszczot	Poland	1:48.37	Q
6	4	Álvaro de Arriba	Spain	1:48.57	Q
7	4	Paul Renaudie	France	1:48.63	q
8	4	Andreas Bube	Denmark	1:48.68	q
9	4	Guy Learmonth	Great Britain	1:48.73	
10	1	Balázs Vindics	Hungary	1:49.18	
11	2	Jan Kubista	Czech Republic	1:49.21	Q
12	2	Amel Tuka	Bosnia and Herzegovina	1:49.84	Q
13	3	Kyle Langford	Great Britain	1:49.93	Q
14	3	Kevin López	Spain	1:49.96	Q
15	3	Christoph Kessler	Germany	1:50.04	
16	2	Mateusz Borkowski	Poland	1:50.08	
17	3	Jan Van Den Broeck	Belgium	1:50.43	
18	2	Zak Curran	Ireland	1:50.87	
19	2	Pol Moya	Andorra	1:50.88	
20	1	Brice Etès	Monaco	1:51.35	
21	3	Hugo Santacruz	Switzerland	1:52.61	
22	2	Jozef Repčík	Slovakia	1:52.62	
23	4	Tigran Mkrtchyan	Armenia	1:53.54	
24	3	Matúš Talán	Slovakia	1:57.83	

=== Semifinals ===
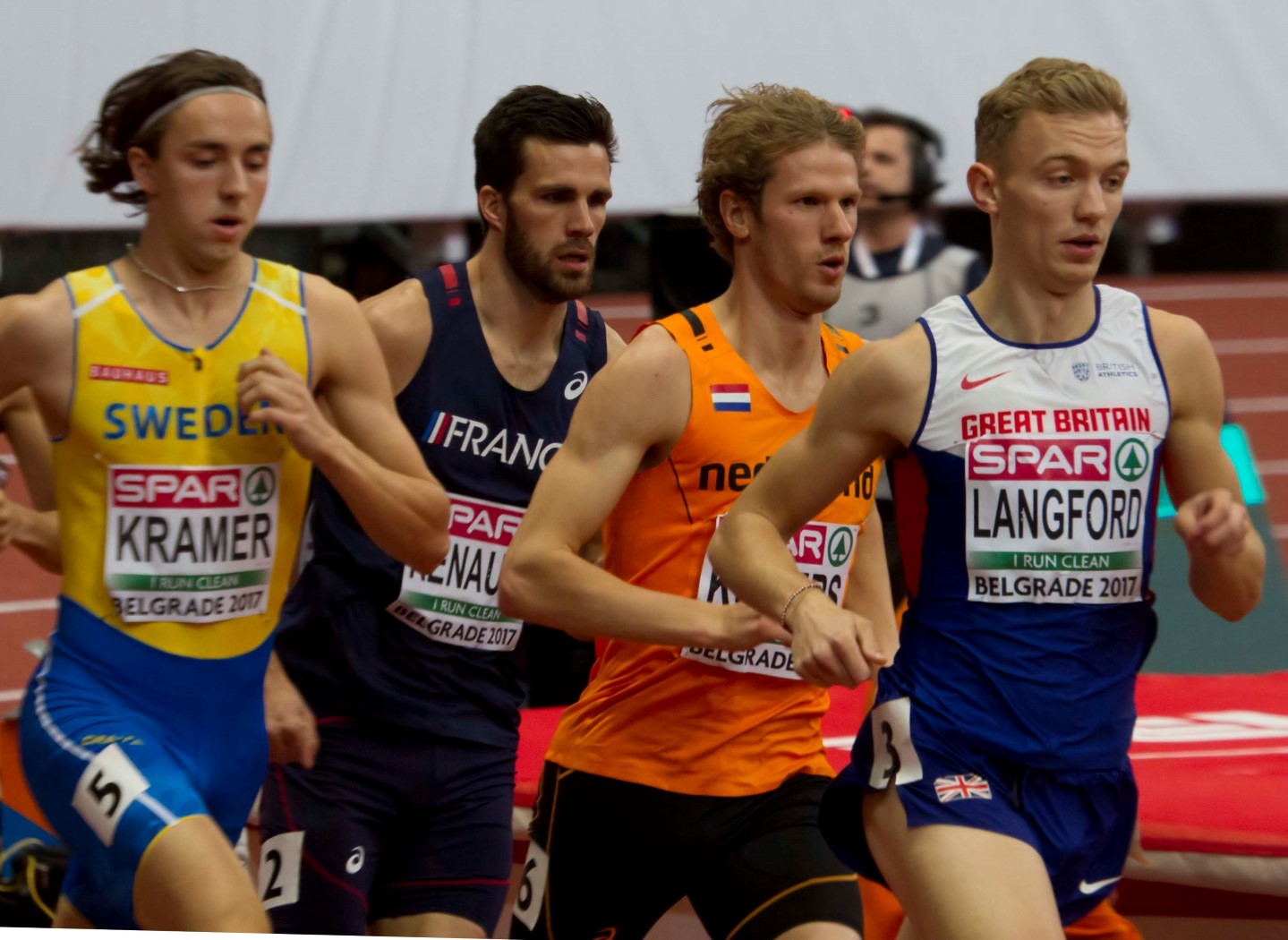
Semifinal 1

Qualification: First 3 in each heat (Q) advance to the Final.

Rank	Heat	Athlete	Nationality	Time	Note
1	1	Álvaro de Arriba	Spain	1:48.36	Q
2	1	Adam Kszczot	Poland	1:48.53	Q
3	1	Thijmen Kupers	Netherlands	1:48.69	Q
4	1	Kyle Langford	Great Britain	1:49.23	
5	1	Paul Renaudie	France	1:49.26	
6	2	Andreas Bube	Denmark	1:49.42	Q
7	2	Daniel Andújar	Spain	1:49.44	Q
8	2	Kevin López	Spain	1:49.53	Q
8	1	Andreas Kramer	Sweden	1:49.53	
10	2	Jan Kubista	Czech Republic	1:49.81	
11	2	Robert Farken	Germany	1:51.39	
	2	Amel Tuka	Bosnia and Herzegovina	DNS	

=== Final ===
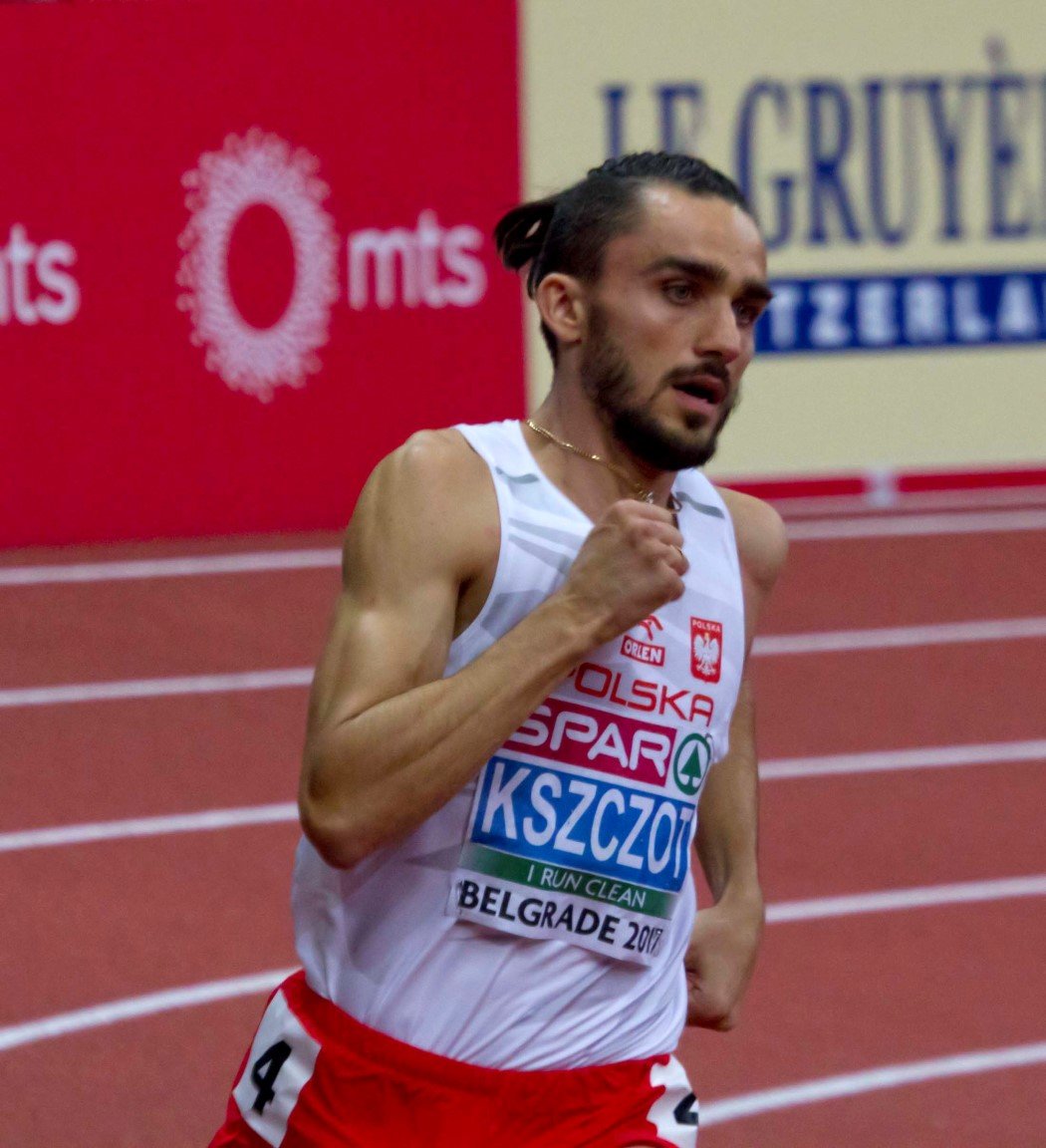
The winner Adam Kszczot

Rank	Athlete	Nationality	Time	Note
1st place, gold medalist(s)	Adam Kszczot	Poland	1:48.87	
2nd place, silver medalist(s)	Andreas Bube	Denmark	1:49.32	
3rd place, bronze medalist(s)	Álvaro de Arriba	Spain	1:49.68	
4	Daniel Andújar	Spain	1:50.28	
5	Thijmen Kupers	Netherlands	1:50.47	
6	Kevin López	Spain	1:54.17	
