= Paul Renaudie =

French middle-distance runner

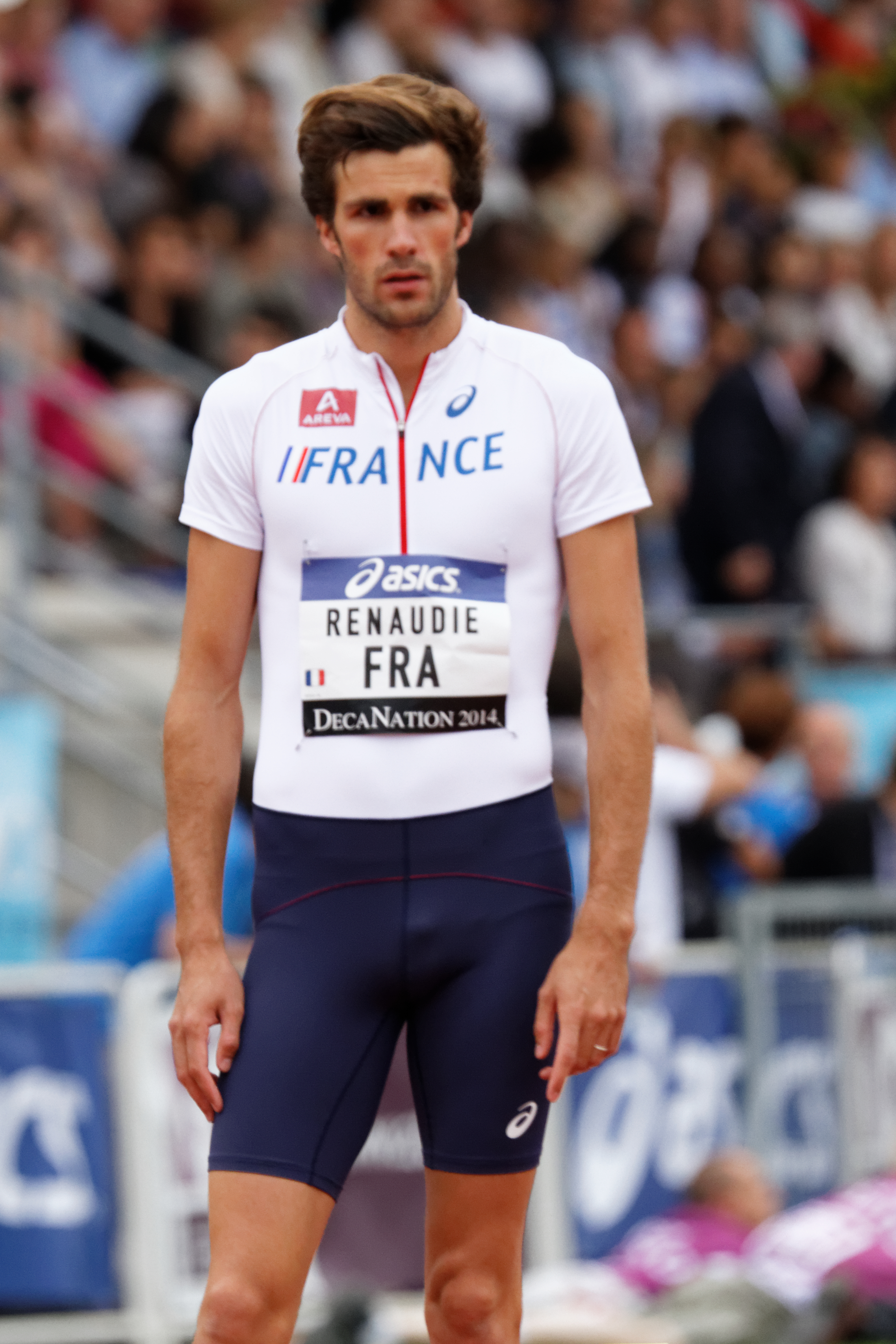
- Paul Renaudie in 2014

Personal information
- Born: 2 April 1990 (age 36) Courbevoie, France
- Height: 1.92 m (6 ft 4 in)
- Weight: 78 kg (172 lb)

Sport
- Sport: Athletics
- Event: 800 metres
- Club: Bordeaux Athlé

Paul Renaudie (born 2 April 1990 in Courbevoie) is a French middle-distance runner specialising in the 800 metres. He represented his country at two outdoor and two indoor European Championships.

== International competitions ==
Year	Competition	Venue	Position	Event	Notes
Representing France
2009	European Junior Championships	Novi Sad, Serbia	6th	800 m	1:51.35
2011	European U23 Championships	Ostrava, Czech Republic	8th	800 m	1:49.82
2012	European Championships	Helsinki, Finland	18th (sf)	800 m	1:48.97
2013	Mediterranean Games	Nice, France	5th	800 m	1:46.84
2014	European Championships	Zürich, Switzerland	9th (sf)	800 m	1:47.54
2015	European Indoor Championships	Prague, Czech Republic	15th (sf)	800 m	1:53.14
2017	European Indoor Championships	Belgrade, Serbia	5th (sf)	800 m	1:49.26

== Personal bests ==
Outdoor

- 400 metres – 48.06 (Lens 2014)
- 800 metres – 1:45.85 (Lille 2012)

Indoor

- 400 metres – 48.90 (Eaubonne 2013)
- 800 metres – 1:47.80 (Stockholm 2016)
- 1000 metres – 2:20.67 (Metz 2014)
- 1500 metres – 3:50.97 (Fontainebleau 2016)
