= Andreas Bube =

Danish middle-distance runner

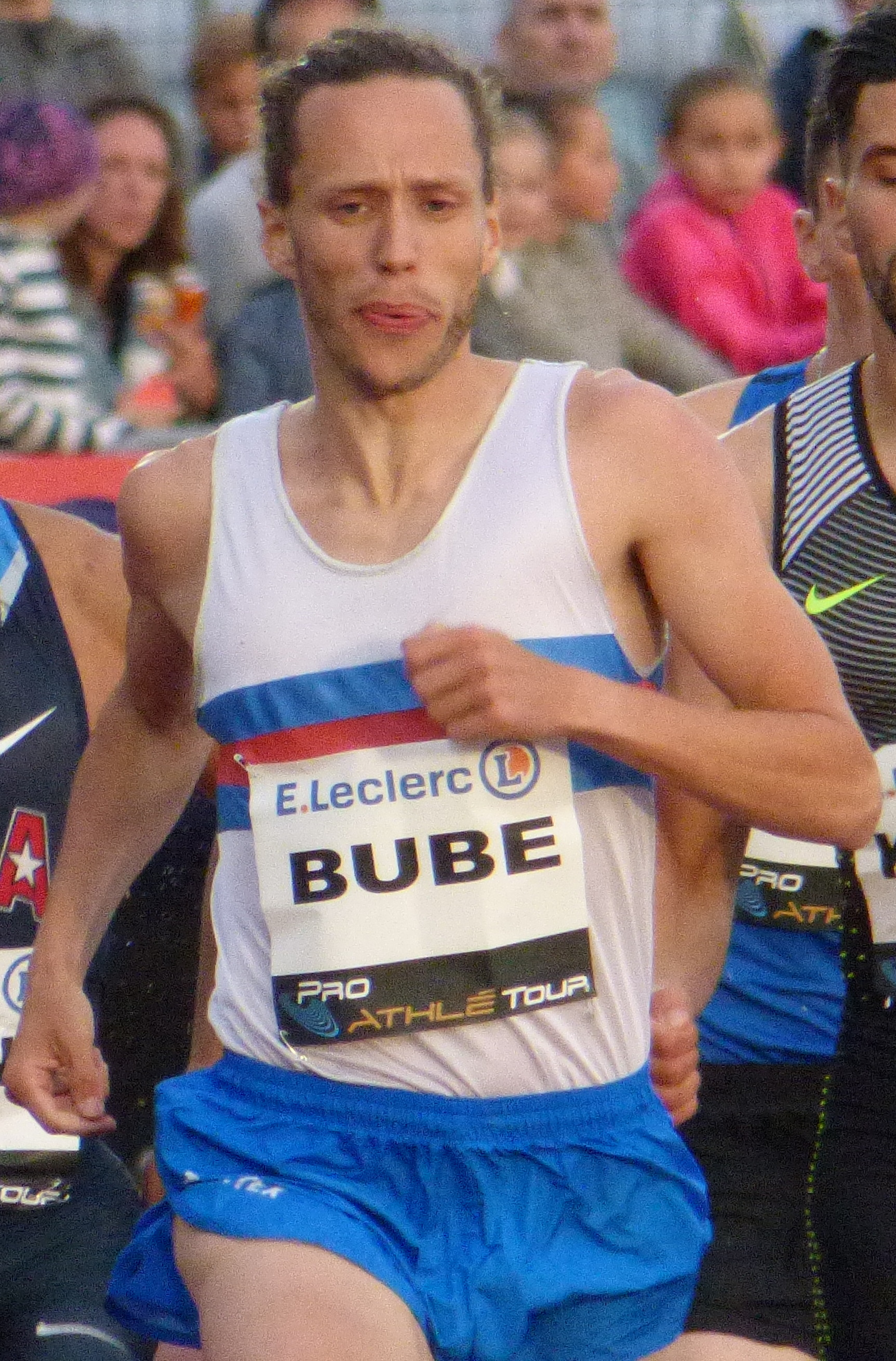

Personal information
- Full name: Andreas Hjartbro Bube
- Born: 13 July 1987 (age 39) Gladsaxe, Denmark

Sport
- Country: Denmark
- Sport: Track and field
- Event: Middle distance running
Medal record
European Championships
Silver medal – second place	2012 Helsinki	800 m
European Indoor Championships
Silver medal – second place	2017 Belgrade	800 m

Andreas Hjartbro Bube (born 13 July 1987) is a Danish track and field athlete competing in the 800 metres. His personal best in that event is 1:44.89, achieved in 2012 in Monaco. Earlier in his career, he used to compete in the 400 metres and 400 metres hurdles.

Bube won a silver medal at the 2012 European Championships in Helsinki at 800 metres event.

== Competition record ==
Year	Competition	Venue	Position	Event	Notes
Representing Denmark
2005	European Junior Championships	Kaunas, Lithuania	18th (h)	400 m hurdles	53.05
2006	World Junior Championships	Beijing, China	20th (sf)	400m hurdles	53.35
2006	World Junior Championships	Beijing, China	15th (h)	4 × 400 m relay	3:16.94
2007	European U23 Championships	Debrecen, Hungary	18th (h)	400 m hurdles	52.81
2009	European Indoor Championships	Turin, Italy	22nd (h)	400 m	48.02
2009	European U23 Championships	Kaunas, Lithuania	14th (sf)	400 m	46.97
2009	European U23 Championships	Kaunas, Lithuania	10th (h)	4 × 400 m relay	3:17.15
2010	European Championships	Barcelona, Spain	26th (h)	800 m	1:51.91
2010	European Championships	Barcelona, Spain	15th (h)	4 × 400 m relay	3:09.04
2011	European Indoor Championships	Paris, France	23rd (h)	800 m	1:53.18
2011	World Championships	Daegu, South Korea	9th (sf)	800 m	1:45.48
2012	European Championships	Helsinki, Finland	2nd	800 m	1:48.69
2012	Olympic Games	London, United Kingdom	16th (h)	800 m	1:46.40
2013	European Indoor Championships	Gothenburg, Sweden	19th (h)	800 m	1:51.88
2014	European Championships	Zürich, Switzerland	4th	800 m	1:45.21
2014	European Championships	Zürich, Switzerland	14th (h)	4 × 400 m relay	3:08.12
2015	World Championships	Beijing, China	36th (h)	800 m	1:48.94
2016	European Championships	Amsterdam, Netherlands	9th (sf)	800 m	1:47.55
2016	Olympic Games	Rio de Janeiro, Brazil	16th (sf)	800 m	1:45.87
2017	European Indoor Championships	Belgrade, Serbia	2nd	800 m	1:49.32
2018	European Championships	Berlin, Germany	6th	800 m	1:45.92
2019	European Indoor Championships	Glasgow, Scotland, United Kingdom	5th	800 m	1:47.67
