= Athletics at the 2014 Commonwealth Games – Men's 800 metres =

Event at 2014 Commonwealth Games

Men's 800 metres at the Commonwealth Games

The Men's 800 metres at the 2014 Commonwealth Games, as part of the athletics programme, was held at Hampden Park between 29 and 31 July 2014. The event was won by Olympic silver-medalist Nijel Amos, who beat Olympic champion and world record holder, David Rudisha.

== Results ==
=== Heats ===
==== Heat 1 ====
Rank	Lane	Name	Result	Notes	Qual.
1	6	David Rudisha (KEN)	1:46.89		Q
2	3	Michael Rimmer (ENG)	1:47.64		Q
3	4	Ricardo Cunningham (JAM)	1:47.71	SB	Q
4	5	Guy Learmonth (SCO)	1:47.85		q
5	1	Brandon McBride (CAN)	1:49.29		q
6	2	Robert Thimothy Bagina (RWA)	1:55.31		
7	7	Kevin Kapmatana (PNG)	1:59.09		

==== Heat 2 ====
Rank	Lane	Name	Result	Notes	Qual.
1	3	André Olivier (RSA)	1:47.93		Q
2	2	Ronald Musagala (UGA)	1:48.23		Q
3	1	Alberto Mamba (MOZ)	1:48.57		Q
4	4	Mukhtar Mohammed (ENG)	1:49.13		q
5	6	Sean Obinwa (NGR)	1:50.59		
6	5	Kendis Bullard (TTO)	1:51.57		

==== Heat 3 ====
Rank	Lane	Name	Result	Notes	Qual.
1	7	Jeffrey Riseley (AUS)	1:48.63		Q
2	6	Ferguson Cheruiyot Rotich (KEN)	1:48.70		Q
3	2	Joe Thomas (WAL)	1:49.38		Q
4	1	Shaquille Dill (BER)	1:49.61		q
5	3	Kaminiel Matlaun (PNG)	1:52.36	PB	
6	4	Alex Beddoes (COK)	1:53.160	NR	
	5	Andrew Osagie (ENG)		DQ	

==== Heat 4 ====
Rank	Lane	Name	Result	Notes	Qual.
1	3	Aaron Evans (BER)	1:50.48		Q
2	5	Nijel Amos (BOT)	1:50.56		Q
3	7	Evans Kipkorir (KEN)	1:50.88		Q
4	6	Jamaal James (TTO)	1:51.62		
5	1	Josh Ralph (AUS)	1:52.48		
6	4	Emmanuel Ntakiyimana (RWA)	1:55.61		
7	2	Veherney Babob (PNG)	2:03.45		

=== Semi-finals ===
==== Semi-final 1 ====
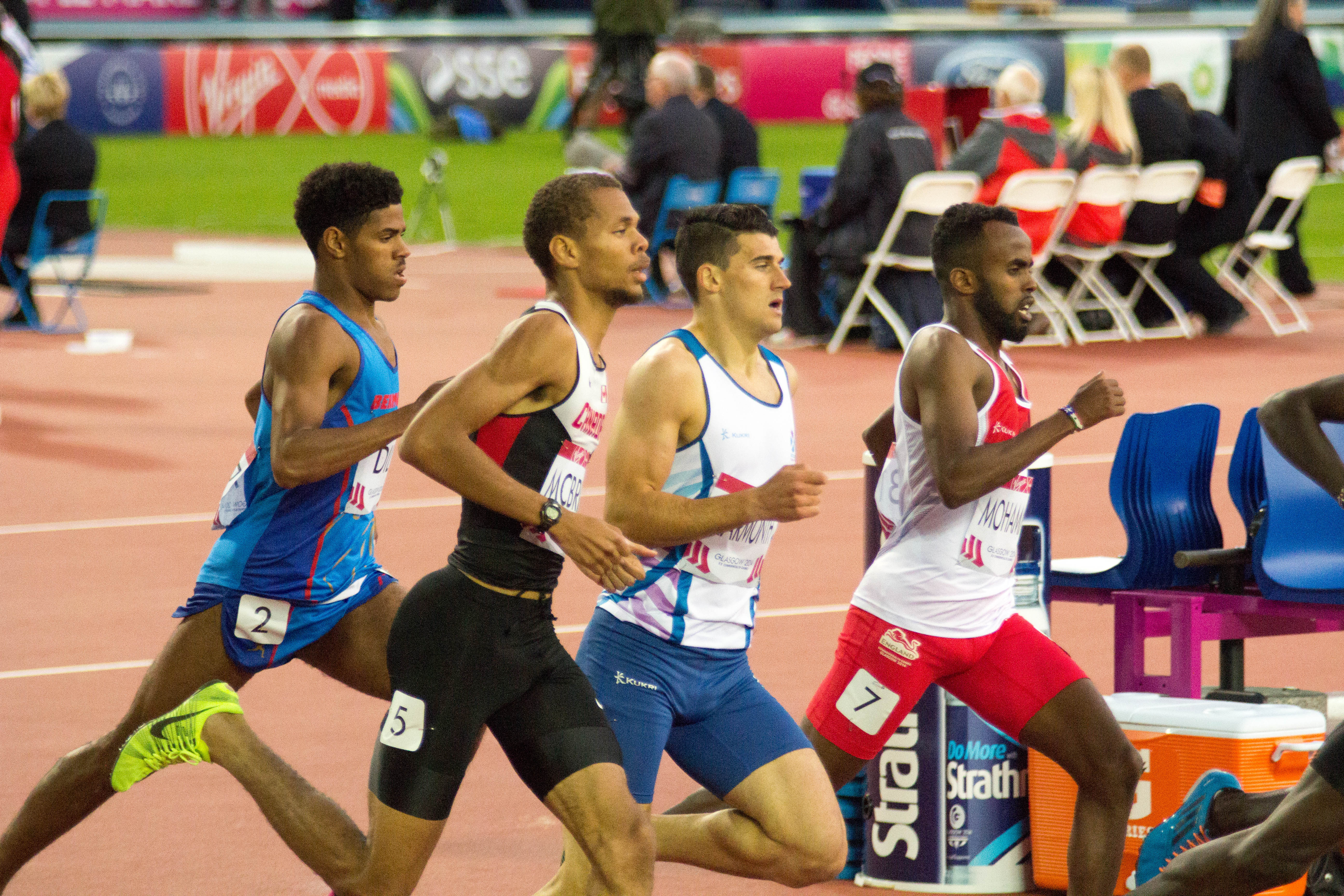
Semifinal 1

Rank	Lane	Name	Result	Notes	Qual.
1	3	David Rudisha (KEN)	1:46.61		Q
2	4	Ferguson Cheruiyot Rotich (KEN)	1:46.88		Q
3	8	Guy Learmonth (SCO)	1:47.78		Q
4	1	Ricardo Cunningham (JAM)	1:47.80		
5	6	Jeffrey Riseley (AUS)	1:47.82		q
6	2	Shaquille Dill (BER)	1:48.59		
7	7	Mukhtar Mohammed (ENG)	1:51.91		
	5	Brandon McBride (CAN)	DQ		

==== Semi-final 2 ====
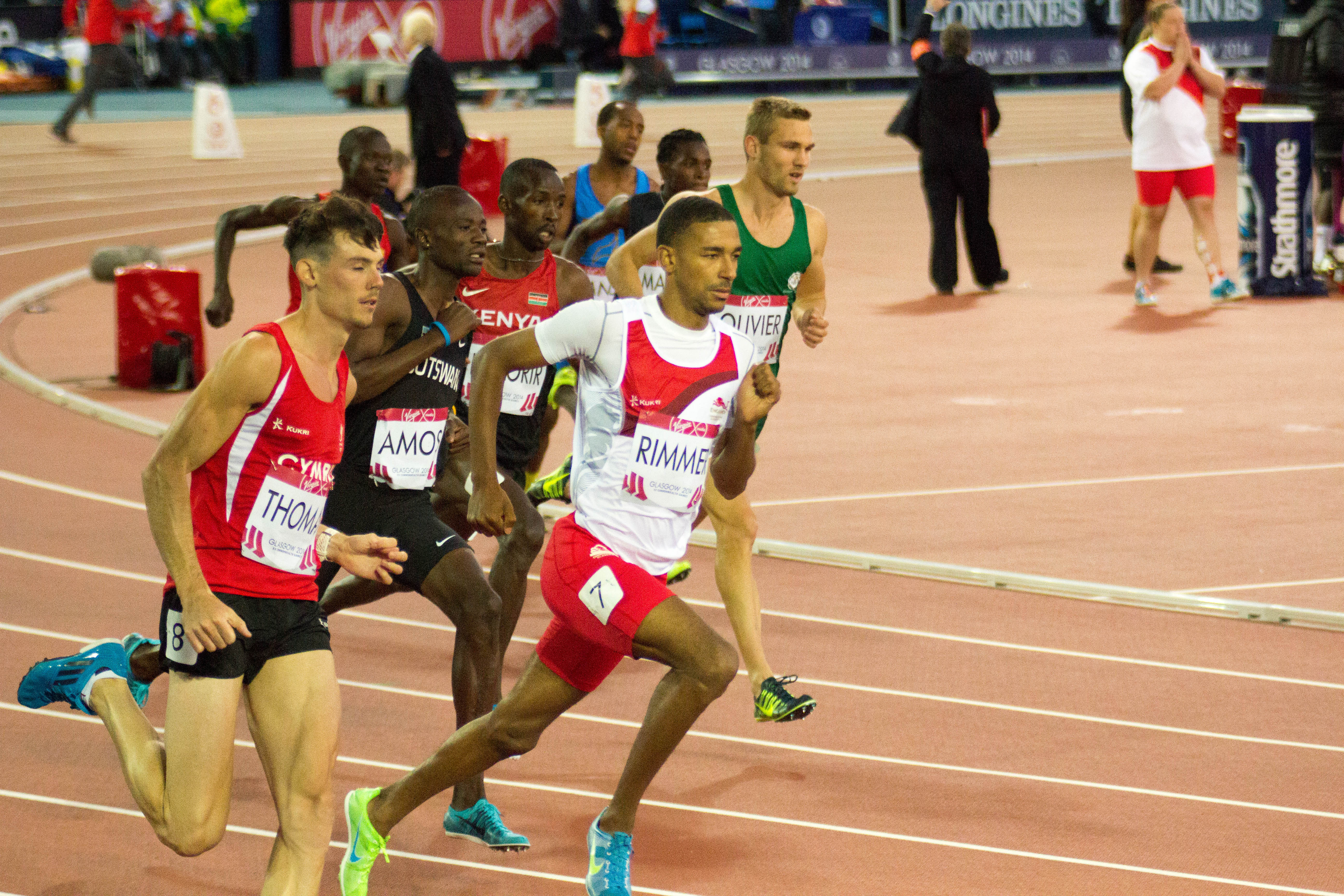
Semifinal 2

Rank	Lane	Name	Result	Notes	Qual.
1	6	Nijel Amos (BOT)	1:45.65		Q
2	3	Ronald Musagala (UGA)	1:45.98		Q
3	4	André Olivier (RSA)	1:46.30		Q
4	5	Evans Kipkorir (KEN)	1:47.35		q
5	7	Michael Rimmer (ENG)	1:47.70		q
6	2	Alberto Mamba (MOZ)	1:47.73	NR	
7	8	Joe Thomas (WAL)	1:50.08		
8	1	Aaron Evans (BER)	1:50.17		

=== Final ===
Rank	Lane	Name	Result	Notes
1st place, gold medalist(s)	5	Nijel Amos (BOT)	1:45.18	
2nd place, silver medalist(s)	4	David Rudisha (KEN)	1:45.48	
3rd place, bronze medalist(s)	6	André Olivier (RSA)	1:46.03	
4	8	Ferguson Cheruiyot Rotich (KEN)	1:46.09	
5	3	Jeffrey Riseley (AUS)	1:46.12	
6	1	Guy Learmonth (SCO)	1:46.69	PB
7	2	Michael Rimmer (ENG)	1:46.71	
8	9	Ronald Musagala (UGA)	1:47.19	
9	7	Evans Kipkorir (KEN)	1:47.34	
