= Athletics at the 2010 South American Games – Men's 800 metres =

The Men's 800m event at the 2010 South American Games was held on March 21 at 18:20.

== Medalists ==
Gold	Silver	Bronze
Rafith Rodríguez; Colombia	Lutimar Paes; Brazil	Diomar de Souza; Brazil

== Records ==
Standing records prior to the 2010 South American Games
World record	Wilson Kipketer	Denmark	1:41.11	Köln, Germany	24 August 1997
World Leading	David Rudisha	Kenya	1:43.15	Melbourne, Australia	4 March 2010
South American record	Joaquim Cruz	Brazil	1:41.77	Köln, Germany	26 August 1984
South American U23 record	Joaquim Cruz	Brazil	1:41.77	Köln, Germany	26 August 1984

The following records were set during the competition:

Date	Event	Athlete	Time	Notes
21 March	Final	Rafith Rodríguez (COL)	1:47.20 s	NR

== Results ==
Results were published.

Rank	Athlete	Nationality	Result	Notes
1st place, gold medalist(s)	Rafith Rodríguez	Colombia	1:47.20	NR
2nd place, silver medalist(s)	Lutimar Paes	Brazil	1:47.52	
3rd place, bronze medalist(s)	Diomar de Souza	Brazil	1:50.14	
4	Tomás Squella	Chile	1:50.62	
5	Julio Alfredo Pérez	(Peru) Perú	1:50.66	SB
6	Diego Rincón	Colombia	1:52.31	SB
7	Luciano Joaquín Almirón	Argentina	1:53.06	SB
8	José Alarcón	Chile	1:53.08	
9	David Washco	Ecuador	1:53.46	
10	Franco Díaz	Argentina	2:05.55	

Intermediate times:

400m	52.48	Diomar de Souza (BRA)
600m	1:20.39	Diomar de Souza (BRA)

== See also ==
- 2010 South American Under-23 Championships in Athletics
