= André Olivier =

South African middle-distance runner

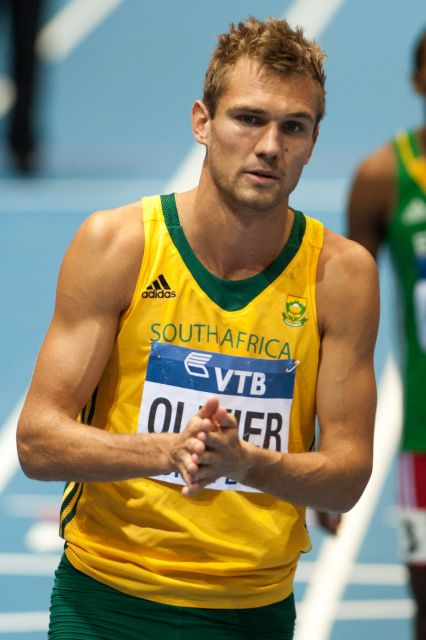
- Olivier at the 2014 IAAF World Indoor Championships.

Personal information
- Nationality: South African
- Born: 29 December 1989 (age 36) Pietermaritzburg, South Africa
- Height: 1.92 m (6 ft 4 in)
- Weight: 76 kg (168 lb)

Sport
- Sport: Running
- Event: Middle distances

Achievements and titles
- Personal bests: 800 m: 1:44.29 (Monaco 2012); 1500 m: 3:39.40 (Durban 2009)
Medal record
Men's athletics
Representing South Africa
African Championships
Bronze medal – third place	2012 Porto-Novo	800 m
Commonwealth Games
Bronze medal – third place	2014 Glasgow	800 m
Summer Universiade
Bronze medal – third place	2011 Shenzhen	4×400 m relay
World Junior Championships
Bronze medal – third place	2008 Bydgoszcz	800 m

André Olivier (born 29 December 1989) is a South African middle distance runner.

He won a bronze medal in the 800m race at the 2014 Commonwealth Games in Glasgow, Scotland, behind winner Nigel Amos of Botswana and David Rudisha (Olympic champion and world record holder) of Kenya.

Olivier won a bronze medal at the 2008 World Junior Championships in Athletics in Bydgoszcz, Poland.

== Competition record ==
Year	Competition	Venue	Position	Event	Notes
Representing South Africa
2007	African Junior Championships	Ouagadougou, Burkina Faso	4th	800 m	1:48.52
2008	World Junior Championships	Bydgoszcz, Poland	3rd	800m	1:47.57
2008	World Junior Championships	Bydgoszcz, Poland	17th (h)	4 × 400 m relay	3:12.09
2011	Universiade	Shenzhen, China	5th (sf)	800 m	1:47.48
2011	Universiade	Shenzhen, China	3rd	4 × 400 m relay	3:05.61
2012	African Championships	Porto-Novo, Benin	3rd	800 m	1:45.09
2012	Olympic Games	London, United Kingdom	13th (sf)	800 m	1:45.44
2014	World Indoor Championships	Sopot, Poland	4th	800 m	1:47.31
2014	Commonwealth Games	Glasgow, United Kingdom	3rd	800 m	1:46.03
