= Kevin López (runner) =

Spanish middle-distance runner

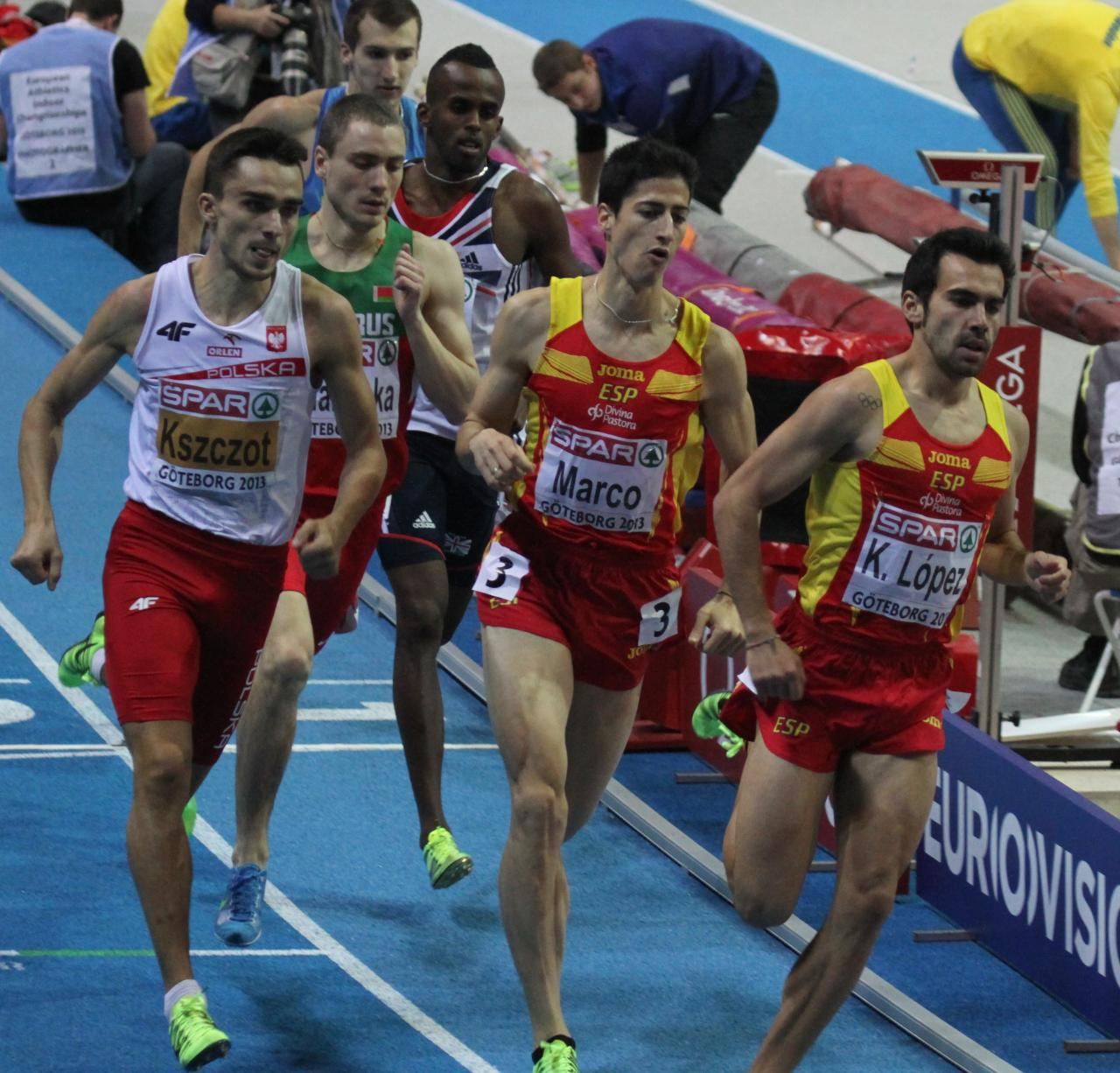
López (right) at the 2013 European Indoor Championships.

Kevin López Yerga (born 12 June 1990) is a Spanish middle distance runner. He was born in Lora del Río.

== Competition record ==
Year	Competition	Venue	Position	Event	Notes
Representing Spain
2008	World Junior Championships	Bydgoszcz, Poland	23rd (sf)	800 m	1:53.57
2009	European Junior Championships	Novi Sad, Serbia	1st	800 m	1:48.25
2010	European Championships	Barcelona, Spain	6th	800 m	1:47.82
2011	European Indoor Championships	Paris, France	3rd	800 m	1:48.35
2011	European U23 Championships	Ostrava, Czech Republic	2nd	800 m	1:46.93
2011	World Championships	Daegu, South Korea	19th (sf)	800 m	1:46.86
2012	European Championships	Helsinki, Finland	10th (sf)	800 m	1:47.30
2012	Olympic Games	London, United Kingdom	20th (sf)	800 m	1:46.66
2013	European Indoor Championships	Gothenburg, Sweden	2nd	800 m	1:49.31
2013	World Championships	Moscow, Russia	22nd (sf)	800 m	1:52.93
2014	World Indoor Championships	Sopot, Poland	9th (h)	800 m	1:47.34
2014	World Indoor Championships	Sopot, Poland	9th (h)	4 × 400 m relay	3:10.17
2014	IAAF World Relays	Nassau, Bahamas	5th	4 × 800 m relay	7:19.90
2014	European Championships	Zürich, Switzerland	14th (sf)	800 m	1:48.90
2015	European Indoor Championships	Prague, Czech Republic	3rd (sf)	800 m	1:47.78
2015	World Championships	Beijing, China	10th (sf)	800 m	1:45.84
2016	Olympic Games	Rio de Janeiro, Brazil	53rd (h)	800 m	1:53.41
2017	European Indoor Championships	Belgrade, Serbia	6th	800 m	1:54.17
2017	World Championships	London, United Kingdom	23rd (sf)	800 m	1:47.62
2019	World Championships	Doha, Qatar	19th (s)	1500 m	3:37.56
