= Geoffrey Harris (runner) =

Canadian middle-distance runner (born 1987)

Personal information
- Nationality: Canada
- Born: January 30, 1987 (age 39) Halifax, Nova Scotia
- Height: 1.72 m (5 ft 8 in)
- Weight: 75 kg (165 lb)

Sport
- Sport: Running
- Event: 800 metres
- Club: Halifast Athletics

Achievements and titles
- Personal bests: 800 m: 1:45.97, 2012 Olympic Games, London, 06/08/2012

Geoffrey Harris (born January 30, 1987, in Halifax, Nova Scotia) is a Canadian middle-distance runner. Harris qualified for the 2012 London Olympics in the 800 metres event with two Olympic standards and a first-place finish at the 2012 Canadian Olympics field & Track in Calgary. At the Olympics, he reached the semi-finals.

== Career highlights ==
- 2nd, 2012 Olympic Games Preliminary Heats in a personal best 1:45.97
- 1st, 2012 National Championships, Calgary, Canada (Olympic Standard).
- 10th, 2006 IAAF World Junior Championships, Beijing, China.
- Best time 600m: 1:18.36, Montréal, 27/01/2007
- Best time 800m: 1:45.97, 2012 Olympic Games, London, 06/08/2012
