= Hamada Mohamed =

Egyptian middle-distance runner

Personal information
- Nationality: Egyptian
- Born: October 22, 1992 (age 33) Qena, Egypt
- Height: 1.78 m (5 ft 10 in)
- Weight: 63 kg (139 lb)

Sport
- Sport: Track
- Events: 800 metres, 1500 metres

Achievements and titles
- Personal bests: 800 metres: 1:44.98; 1500 metres: 3:38.16
Medal record
Men's athletics
Representing Egypt
Silver medal – second place	2011 Al Ain	1500 m

Hamada Mohamed (born 22 October 1992), also known as Mohamed Ahmed Hamada, is an Egyptian middle-distance runner. He represented Egypt at the 2012 Summer Olympics. Mohamed holds multiple national track records for Egypt.

== Running career ==
One of Mohamed's first international appearances was at the 2010 IAAF World Cross Country Championships, where he finished the Junior men's race in 28:25 (min:sec), the 113th of 118 finishers. Hamada would later produce much livelier results on the track.

At the 2011 Arab Athletics Championships, Mohamed finished second in the 1,500 metres race, recording a time of 3:59.15. Later that same year, at the 2011 Pan Arab Games, Mohamed ran the 800 metres, finishing the finals round in fifth place of six finishers, in a time of 1:48.08.

Due to his promising results even though he was only a teenager, Mohamed was selected by Egypt to compete at the 2012 Summer Olympics. At the 2012 Summer Olympics, he ran in the men's 800 metres where he finished 8th in his semi-finals heat with a time of 1:48:18.

Mohamed then ran in the first heat of the men's 800 metres at the 2013 World Championships in Athletics, barely missing qualification to the next round, although he ran a great race against the likes of Marcin Lewandowski and Giordano Benedetti.
