= Rafith Rodríguez =

Colombian athlete (born 1989)

Personal information
- Full name: Rafith Rodríguez Lleneres
- Born: June 1, 1989 (age 37) El Bagre, Colombia
- Height: 1.88 m (6 ft 2 in)
- Weight: 68 kg (150 lb)

Sport
- Country: Colombia
- Sport: Athletics
- Event: Middle-distance running
Medal record
Representing Colombia
Men's athletics
Pan American Games
| Silver medal – second place | 2015 Toronto | 800 m |
South American Championships
| Gold medal – first place | 2013 Cartagena | 800 m |
| Silver medal – second place | 2013 Cartagena | 4×400 m relay |
Bolivarian Games
| Silver medal – second place | 2009 Sucre | 800 m |
- Updated on 20 December 2024

Rafith Rodríguez Lleneres (born 1 June 1989 in El Bagre), is a Colombian athlete competing predominantly in the 800 metres. His personal best in the event is 1:44.31 achieved in 2011 in Belém.

== Personal bests ==
- 400 m: 45.62 –Trujillo, Peru, 26 November 2013
- 800 m: 1:44.31 – Belém, Brazil, 15 May 2011
- 1500 m: 3:42.75 – Santiago, Chile, 14 March 2014

== International competitions ==
| Year | Competition | Venue | Position | Event | Notes |
Representing Colombia
| 2008 | World Junior Championships | Bydgoszcz, Poland | 42nd (h) | 800 m | 1:53.72 |
| 2009 | Bolivarian Games | Sucre, Bolivia | 2nd | 800 m | 1:55.37 A |
| 2010 | South American U23 Championships (South American Games) | Medellín, Colombia | 1st | 800 m | 1:47.20 |
| 2010 | South American U23 Championships (South American Games) | Medellín, Colombia | 3rd | 4x400 m relay | 3:09.03 |
| 2010 | Ibero-American Championships | San Fernando, Spain | 4th | 800 m | 1:46.97 |
| 2010 | Central American and Caribbean Games | Mayagüez, Puerto Rico | 5th | 800 m | 1:48.71 |
| 2011 | South American Championships | Buenos Aires, Argentina | 1st | 800 m | 1:51.38 |
| 2011 | South American Championships | Buenos Aires, Argentina | 2nd | 4×400 m relay | 3:09.67 |
| 2011 | Universiade | Shenzhen, China | 17th (h) | 400 m | 47.20 |
| 2011 | Universiade | Shenzhen, China | 13th (sf) | 800 m | 1:48.17 |
| 2011 | World Championships | Daegu, South Korea | 15th (sf) | 800 m | 1:46.41 |
| 2011 | Pan American Games | Guadalajara, Mexico | 9th | 800 m | 1:58.27 |
| 2012 | World Indoor Championships | Istanbul, Turkey | – (sf) | 800 m | DNF |
| 2012 | Olympic Games | London, United Kingdom | 30th (h) | 800 m | 1:47.70 |
| 2013 | South American Championships | Cartagena, Colombia | 1st | 800 m | 1:46.34 |
| 2013 | South American Championships | Cartagena, Colombia | 2nd | 4x400 m relay | 3:06.25 |
| 2013 | World Championships | Moscow, Russia | 23rd (sf) | 800 m | 2:01.94 |
| 2013 | Bolivarian Games | Trujillo, Peru | 1st | 400 m | 45.62 |
| 2013 | Bolivarian Games | Trujillo, Peru | 1st | 800 m | 1:45.14 |
| 2013 | Bolivarian Games | Trujillo, Peru | 1st | 4×400 m relay | 3:05.43 |
| 2014 | South American Games | Santiago, Chile | 2nd | 800 m | 1:45.39 |
| 2014 | South American Games | Santiago, Chile | 3rd | 1500 m | 3:42.75 |
| 2014 | South American Games | Santiago, Chile | 3rd | 4x400 m relay | 3:10.15 |
| 2014 | Ibero-American Championships | São Paulo, Brazil | 1st | 800 m | 1:44.77 |
| 2014 | Central American and Caribbean Games | Xalapa, Mexico | 2nd | 800 m | 1:45.74 A |
| 2014 | Central American and Caribbean Games | Xalapa, Mexico | 3rd | 4x400 m relay | 3:02.52 A |
| 2015 | South American Championships | Lima, Peru | 1st | 800m | 1:46.48 |
| 2015 | World Championships | Beijing, China | 9th (sf) | 800 m | 1:45.63 |
| 2016 | Olympic Games | Rio de Janeiro, Brazil | 17th (h) | 800 m | 1:46.65 |
| 2017 | Bolivarian Games | Santa Marta, Colombia | 1st | 800 m | 1:46.84 |
| 2017 | Bolivarian Games | Santa Marta, Colombia | 1st | 4x400 m relay | 3:06.14 |
| 2018 | South American Games | Cochabamba, Bolivia | – | 800 m | DNF |
| 2018 | Central American and Caribbean Games | Barranquilla, Colombia | 12th (h) | 800 m | 1:50.33 |
| 2018 | Central American and Caribbean Games | Barranquilla, Colombia | 3rd | 4x400 m relay | 3:04.35 |
