= Vojtěch Kubista =

Czech footballer (born 1993)

Personal information
- Date of birth: 19 March 1993 (age 33)
- Place of birth: Jablonec nad Nisou, Czech Republic
- Height: 1.92 m (6 ft 4 in)
- Positions: Defensive midfielder; centre-back

Team information
- Current team: ViOn Zlaté Moravce
- Number: 13

Youth career
- 2000–2001: Sparta Prague
- 2001–2012: Jablonec

Senior career*
Years	Team	Apps	(Gls)
2012–2022	Jablonec	181	(12)
2015	→ Karviná (loan)	12	(1)
2015	→ Mladá Boleslav (loan)	1	(0)
2022–2024	Mladá Boleslav	42	(3)
2024–2025	Spartak Trnava	4	(0)
2025	→ Komárno (loan)	10	(3)
2025–2026	Sandecja Nowy Sącz	2	(0)
2026	ViOn Zlaté Moravce	7	(1)

International career
2013	Czech Republic U20	2	(0)
2013–2014	Czech Republic U21	2	(0)
- * Club domestic league appearances and goals as of 25 May 2026

Vojtěch Kubista (born 19 March 1993) is a Czech professional footballer who plays as a defensive midfielder or a centre back for Slovak club FC ViOn Zlaté Moravce.

== Club career ==
Kubista made his Czech First League debut for Jablonec on 12 May 2013 in a match against Vysočina Jihlava.

=== Spartak Trnava ===
On 17 April 2024, Kubista joined Slovak club FC Spartak Trnava. He made his league debut for Spartak in a 0–0 draw against Žilina on 18 August 2024, starting the game.

=== KFC Komárno ===
He was plagued by health problems and poor performances, and would leave Trnava with only 9 matches played in the spring of 2025 to join Komárno, on a six-month loan in February 2025. On 11 May 2025, he scored two goals for Komárno in a 5–4 win over Zemplín Michalovce.

=== Sandecja Nowy Sącz ===
On 31 July 2025, it was announced that Kubista would be leaving Spartak following the termination of his contract. A day later, he joined Polish third tier club Sandecja Nowy Sącz.

=== Return to Slovakia: ViOn Zlaté Moravce ===
On 26 January 2026, it was announced that Kubista would be returning to Slovakia, this time joining 2. Liga club FC ViOn Zlaté Moravce.

== Personal life ==
His brother Jan Kubista is a middle-distance runner, as was his father, also named Jan Kubista.

== Honours ==
Jablonec

- Czech Cup: 2012–13
