= Jan van den Broeck =

Belgian middle-distance runner

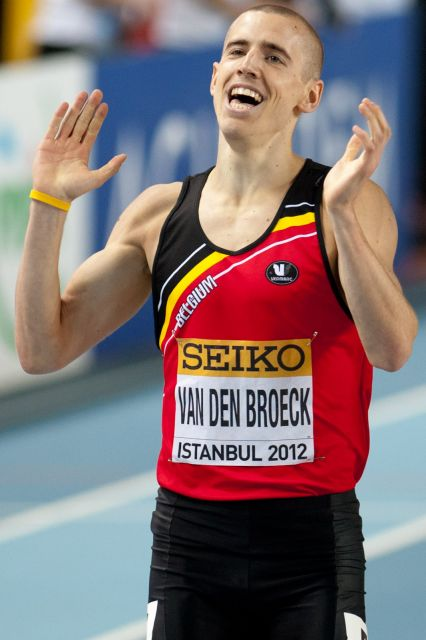
Jan Van Den Broeck at the 2012 World Indoor Championships.

Jan Van Den Broeck (born March 11, 1989, in Dendermonde) is a Belgian middle-distance runner competing primarily in the 800 metres. He finished fifth at the 2012 World Indoor Championships.

His personal bests in the event are 1:46.16 outdoors (Heusden-Zolder 2014) and 1:47.19 indoors (Ghent 2012).

== Achievements ==
Year	Competition	Venue	Position	Event	Notes
Representing Belgium
2008	World Junior Championships	Bydgoszcz, Poland	22nd (sf)	800 m	1:53.11
2010	European Championships	Barcelona, Spain	25th (h)	800 m	1:51.79
2011	European U23 Championships	Ostrava, Czech Republic	7th	800 m	1:49.41
2012	World Indoor Championships	Istanbul, Turkey	5th	800 m	1:50.83
2012	European Championships	Helsinki, Finland	23rd (sf)	800 m	1:50.63
2014	European Championships	Zürich, Switzerland	34th (h)	800 m	1:52.09
2015	European Indoor Championships	Prague, Czech Republic	13th (sf)	800 m	1:51.09
2017	European Indoor Championships	Belgrade, Serbia	17th (h)	800 m	1:50.43
