= Athletics at the 2012 Summer Olympics – Men's 800 metres =

Men's 800 metres at the Games of the XXX Olympiad
- Venue: Olympic Stadium
- Date: 6–9 August
- Competitors: 55 from 43 nations
- Winning time: 1:40.91 WR

Medalists
1st place, gold medalist(s)		David Rudisha; Kenya
2nd place, silver medalist(s)		Nijel Amos; Botswana
3rd place, bronze medalist(s)		Timothy Kitum; Kenya

Official Video

The men's 800 metres competition at the 2012 Summer Olympics in London, United Kingdom, was held at the Olympic Stadium on 6–9 August. Fifty-five athletes from 43 nations competed. The event was won in a world record time of 1:40.91 by David Rudisha of Kenya, the second consecutive and fourth overall title for Kenya in the event. Rudisha would later become the fourth man to successfully defend his Olympic 800 metres title, and the 11th to win two medals of any kind in the event. Nijel Amos' silver medal was the first Olympic medal ever for Botswana. Timothy Kitum of Kenya won the bronze medal.

== Summary ==
Reigning world champion David Rudisha won the race in 1:40.91, becoming the first person to break 1:41 and improving on his own world record (the first world record in an Olympic men's 800m final since 1976). The reigning world junior champion, Nijel Amos, finished second in 1:41.73, establishing a new world junior record and Botswana national record. In an exceptionally fast final, all runners except Abubaker Kaki (who ran a seasonal best) set personal bests, including three national records (Kenya, Botswana, and Ethiopia). The finishing times were the fastest recorded for each placing and it constituted the first time that eight athletes ran under 1:44 in the same race. All the athletes in the race produced times that would have won the final in Beijing. The eighth-place finisher, Andrew Osagie, produced a time that would have won the gold medal at all but three of the previous Olympic 800m finals.

Rudisha led from the start of the race, easing from lane 4 to the break with a determined Kaki in tow. By the halfway mark in 49.28 Mohammed Aman lined up off Kaki's shoulder. During the next 200 meters, Rudisha put a gap on the field and Kaki began falling back. The scramble was on to see who had anything left or, like Kaki, who would pay the price. As Rudisha showed the strain of his effort, Nijel Amos and Timothy Kitum started to make up a little of the ground Rudisha had built up. Running at the back of the field, Duane Solomon and Nick Symmonds made a late run, finishing just a step out of the medals.

== Background ==
This was the 27th appearance of the event, which is one of 12 athletics events to have been held at every Summer Olympics. The only returning finalist from 2008 was silver-medalist Ismail Ahmed Ismail, who had also taken second in the 2011 world championship. 2004 gold medalist, 2008 semifinalist, and 2011 world-championship third-place runner Yuriy Borzakovskiy of Russia competed as well. The clear favorite was David Rudisha of Kenya, the 2011 world champion, world record holder, and #1 ranked runner in 2009, 2010, and 2011.

Cambodia, Iraq, and Mali appeared in the event for the first time. Great Britain made its 26th appearance, most among all nations, having had no competitors in the event only in the 1904 Games in St. Louis.

== Qualification ==
A National Olympic Committee (NOC) could enter up to 3 qualified athletes in the men's 100 metres event if all athletes met the A standard, or 1 athlete if they met the B standard. The maximum number of athletes per nation had been set at 3 since the 1930 Olympic Congress. The qualifying time standards could be obtained in various meets during the qualifying period that had the approval of the IAAF. Indoor and outdoor meets were eligible. The A standard for the 2012 men's 800 metres was 1:45.60; the B standard was 1:46.30. The qualifying period for was from 1 May 2011 to 8 July 2012. NOCs could also have an athlete enter the 800 metres through a universality place. NOCs could enter one male athlete in an athletics event, regardless of time, if they had no male athletes meeting the qualifying A or B standards in any men's athletic event.

== Competition format ==
The competition had seven heats in the first round, three semifinals, and a final. The top three in each of the first round heats progressed, as did the three next fastest runners. The top two finishers in each semifinal race reached the finals along with the two fastest runners outside these runners, to make up the eight finalists.

== Records ==
Prior to the competition, the existing World and Olympic records, and world leading run for the season, were as follows.

World record	David Rudisha (KEN)	1:41.01	Rieti, Italy	29 August 2010
Olympic record	Vebjørn Rodal (NOR)	1:42.58	Atlanta, United States	31 July 1996

2012 World leading	David Rudisha (KEN)	1:41.54	Paris, France	6 July 2012

The following records were established during the competition:

Date	Event	Athlete	Nation	Time	Record
9 August	Final	David Rudisha	Kenya	1:40.91	WR

The following national records were set during the competition.

Kenya national record	David Rudisha (KEN)	1:40.91
Botswana national record	Nijel Amos (BOT)	1:41.73
Ethiopia national record	Mohammed Aman (ETH)	1:43.20

== Schedule ==
All times are British Summer Time (UTC+1)

Date	Time	Round
Monday, 6 August 2012	10:50	Round 1
Tuesday, 7 August 2012	19:55	Semifinals
Thursday, 9 August 2012	20:00	Final

== Results ==
Official Video of Round 1

=== Round 1 ===
Qual. rule: first 3 of each heat (Q) plus the 3 fastest times (q) qualified.

==== Heat 1 ====
Rank	Athlete	Nation	Time	Notes
1	Nijel Amos	Botswana	1:45.90	Q
2	Fabiano Pecanha	Brazil	1:46.29	Q
3	Luis Alberto Marco	Spain	1:46.86	Q
4	Khadevis Robinson	United States	1:47.17	
5	Marcin Lewandowski	Poland	1:47.64	q
6	Ivan Tukhtachev	Russia	1:49.77	
7	Derek Mandell	Guam	1:58.94	
—	Mohammad Al-Azemi	Kuwait	DSQ	R163.2

==== Heat 2 ====
Rank	Athlete	Nation	Time	Notes
1	David Rudisha	Kenya	1:45.90	Q
2	Musaeb Abdulrahman Balla	Qatar	1:46.37	Q
3	Andrew Osagie	Great Britain	1:46.42	Q
4	Wesley Vazquez	Puerto Rico	1:46.45	
5	Jeffrey Riseley	Australia	1:46.99	
6	Ismail Ahmed Ismail	Sudan	1:48.79	
~~7~~	Anis Ananenka	Belarus	~~1:49.61~~	DPG
8	Samorn Kieng	Cambodia	1:55.26	SB

==== Heat 3 ====
Rank	Athlete	Nation	Time	Notes
1	Abubaker Kaki	Sudan	1:45.51	Q
2	Timothy Kitum	Kenya	1:45.72	Q
3	Abdulaziz Mohammed	Saudi Arabia	1:46.09	Q
4	Andy González	Cuba	1:46.24	q
5	Gareth Warburton	Great Britain	1:46.97	
6	Tamás Kazi	Hungary	1:47.10	SB
7	Sören Ludolph	Germany	1:48.57	
8	Arnold Sorina	Vanuatu	1:54.29	

==== Heat 4 ====
Rank	Athlete	Nation	Time	Notes
1	Nick Symmonds	United States	1:45.91	Q
2	Geoffrey Harris	Canada	1:45.97	Q
3	Adam Kszczot	Poland	1:45.99	Q
4	Pierre-Ambroise Bosse	France	1:46.03	q
5	Yuriy Borzakovskiy	Russia	1:46.29	q
6	Andreas Bube	Denmark	1:46.40	
7	Manuel Antonio	Angola	1:52.54	
—	Brice Etes	Monaco	DSQ	

==== Heat 5 ====
Rank	Athlete	Nation	Time	Notes
1	Hamada Mohamed	Egypt	1:48.05	Q
2	Sajad Moradi	Iran	1:48.23	Q
3	Kevin Lopez	Spain	1:48.27	Q
4	Masato Yokota	Japan	1:48.48	
5	Michael Rimmer	Great Britain	1:49.05	
6	Moussa Camara	Mali	1:51.36	
7	Edgar Cortez	Nicaragua	1:58.99	
—	Taoufik Makhloufi	Algeria	DNF	

==== Heat 6 ====
Rank	Athlete	Nation	Time	Notes
1	Mohammed Aman	Ethiopia	1:47.34	Q
2	Anthony Chemut	Kenya	1:47.42	Q
3	Antonio Manuel Reina	Spain	1:47.44	Q
4	Rafith Rodriguez	Colombia	1:47.70	
5	Adnan Taess Akkar	Iraq	1:47.83	
6	Amine El Manaoui	Morocco	1:48.48	
7	Prince Mumba	Zambia	1:49.07	
8	Erzhan Askarov	Kyrgyzstan	1:59.56	

==== Heat 7 ====
Rank	Athlete	Nation	Time	Notes
1	Duane Solomon	United States	1:46.05	Q
2	Robert Lathouwers	Netherlands	1:46.06	Q
3	André Olivier	South Africa	1:46.42	Q
4	Jakub Holuša	Czech Republic	1:46.87	
5	Julius Mutekanga	Uganda	1:48.41	
6	Moise Joseph	Haiti	1:48.46	
7	Benjamín Enzema	Equatorial Guinea	1:57.47	
—	Kleberson Davide	Brazil	DNS	

=== Semifinals ===
Official Video of Semifinals

Qual. rule: first 2 of each heat (Q) plus the 2 fastest times (q) qualified.

==== Semifinal 1 ====
Rank	Athlete	Nation	Time	Notes
1	Abubaker Kaki	Sudan	1:44.51	Q
2	Nijel Amos	Botswana	1:44.54	Q
3	Adam Kszczot	Poland	1:45.34	
4	Anthony Chemut	Kenya	1:45.63	
5	Robert Lathouwers	Netherlands	1:45.85	
6	Luis Alberto Marco	Spain	1:46.19	
7	Fabiano Pecanha	Brazil	1:46.29	
—	Sajad Moradi	Iran	DSQ	R163.3

==== Semifinal 2 ====
Rank	Athlete	Nation	Time	Notes
1	David Rudisha	Kenya	1:44.35	Q
2	Andrew Osagie	Great Britain	1:44.74	Q
3	Nick Symmonds	United States	1:44.87	q
4	Marcin Lewandowski	Poland	1:45.08	
5	Yuriy Borzakovskiy	Russia	1:45.09	SB
6	Kevin Lopez	Spain	1:46.66	
7	Musaeb Abdulrahman Balla	Qatar	1:47.52	
8	Hamada Mohamed	Egypt	1:48.18	
9	Andy Gonzalez	Cuba	1:53.46	

==== Semifinal 3 ====
Rank	Athlete	Nation	Time	Notes
1	Mohammed Aman	Ethiopia	1:44.34	Q
2	Timothy Kitum	Kenya	1:44.63	Q
3	Duane Solomon	United States	1:44.93	q
4	Pierre-Ambroise Bosse	France	1:45.10	
5	André Olivier	South Africa	1:45.44	
6	Antonio Manuel Reina	Spain	1:45.84	
7	Geoffrey Harris	Canada	1:46.14	
8	Abdulaziz Mohammed	Saudi Arabia	1:48.98	

=== Final ===
Rank	Athlete	Nation	Time	Notes
1st place, gold medalist(s)	David Rudisha	Kenya	1:40.91	WR
2nd place, silver medalist(s)	Nijel Amos	Botswana	1:41.73	WJR, NR
3rd place, bronze medalist(s)	Timothy Kitum	Kenya	1:42.53	PB
4	Duane Solomon	United States	1:42.82	PB
5	Nick Symmonds	United States	1:42.95	PB
6	Mohammed Aman	Ethiopia	1:43.20	NR
7	Abubaker Kaki	Sudan	1:43.32	SB
8	Andrew Osagie	Great Britain	1:43.77	PB

Splits

Intermediate	Athlete	Nation	Mark
400m	David Rudisha	Kenya	49.28
600m	David Rudisha	Kenya	1:14.30
