= Jan Kubista (born 1990) =

Czech runner

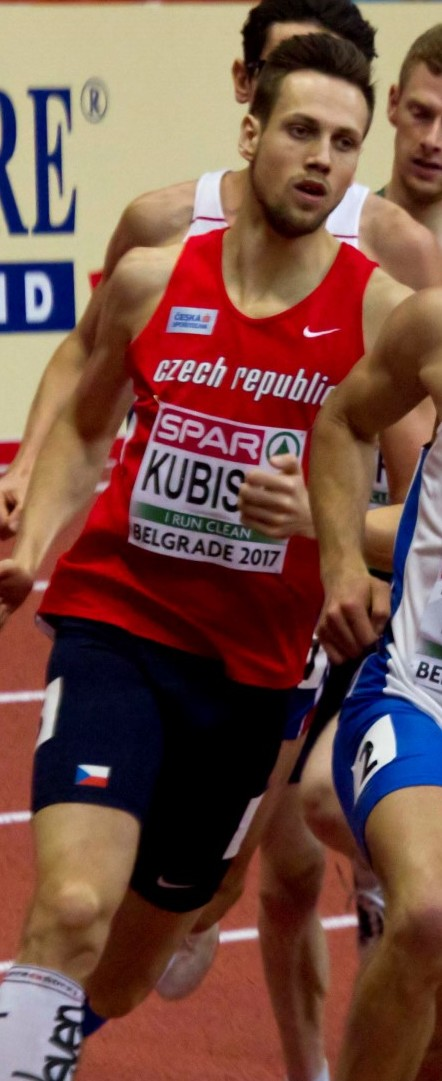

Personal information
- Born: 23 September 1990 (age 35) Prague, Czechoslovakia

Sport
- Sport: Athletics
- Event: 800 metres
- Club: TJ Dukla Praha
- Coached by: Josef Vedra

Jan Kubista (born 23 September 1990 in Prague) is a Czech middle-distance runner competing primarily in the 800 metres. He won the bronze medal in the 4 × 400 metres relay at the 2017 European Indoor Championships. In addition, he represented his country at the 2013 World Championships without advancing from the first round.

His father, also named Jan Kubista, was also a runner. His brother, Vojtěch Kubista, is a professional footballer.

== International competitions ==
Year	Competition	Venue	Position	Event	Notes
Representing the Czech Republic
2011	European U23 Championships	Ostrava, Czech Republic	–	800 m	DNF
2012	European Championships	Helsinki, Finland	17th (sf)	800 m	1:48.94
2013	European Indoor Championships	Gothenburg, Sweden	20th (h)	800 m	1:52.21
2013	World Championships	Moscow, Russia	25th (h)	800 m	1:47.66
2017	European Indoor Championships	Belgrade, Serbia	10th (sf)	800 m	1:49.81
2017	European Indoor Championships	Belgrade, Serbia	3rd	4 × 400 m relay	3:08.60

== Personal bests ==
Outdoor

- 400 metres – 47.03 (Tábor 2013)
- 600 metres – 1:17.11 (Dubnica nad Váhom 2013)
- 800 metres – 1:46.16 (Ostrava 2013)
- 1000 metres – 2:19.73 (Ostrava 2014)
- 1500 metres – 3:51.33 (Vila Real de Santo António 2014)

Indoor

- 400 metres – 47.45 (Prague 2017)
- 600 metres – 1:16.59 (Prague 2017)
- 800 metres – 1:47.61 (Vienna 2017)
- 1500 metres – 3:50.11 (Prague 2017)
