= Amine El Manaoui =

Moroccan middle-distance runner

Amine El Manaoui (Arabic: أمين المناوي; born 20 November 1991) is a Moroccan middle-distance runner. At the 2012 Summer Olympics, he competed in the Men's 800 metres. He took fifth place in a semi-final of the 800 m at the 2015 World Championships in Athletics. He also reached the semifinal at the 2013 World Championships in the 800 m.

He was born in El Kelaa des Sraghna.
