= Jan Kubista (born 1960) =

Czech runner

Personal information
- Nationality: Czech
- Born: 27 May 1960 (age 66) Prague, Czechoslovakia
- Height: 193 cm (6 ft 4 in)
- Weight: 81 kg (179 lb)

Sport
- Country: Czechoslovakia
- Sport: Middle-distance running

Jan Kubista (born 27 May 1960) is a Czech retired middle-distance runner. He represented Czechoslovakia in the men's 1500 meters at the 1988 Summer Olympics. His time was a 3:46.41 in the first heat.

He is a three-time Czechoslovak champion in the 800m (1981, 1982, 1983). In 1986, he became the Czechoslovak indoor champion in the 1500m.

His son, also named Jan Kubista, is also a runner. His other son, Vojtěch Kubista, is a professional footballer.
