= Mukhtar Mohammed =

Somali-born British middle-distance runner

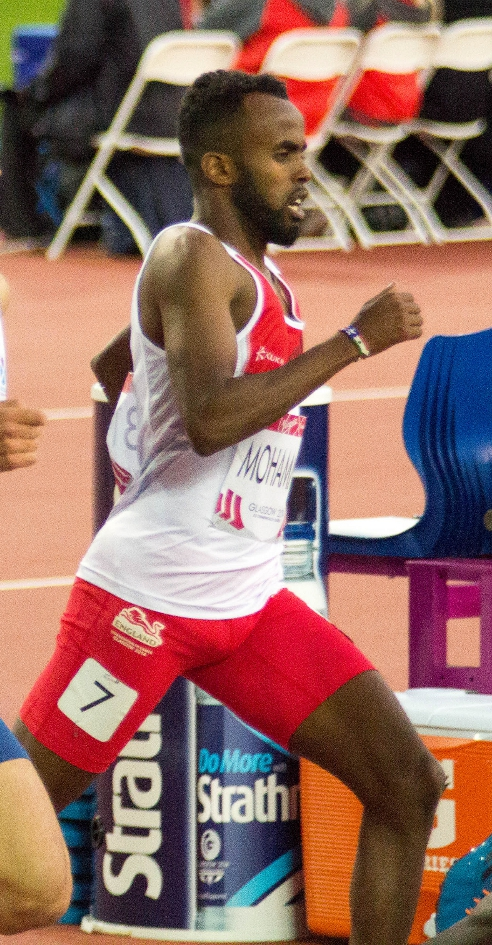
- Mohammed competing at the 2014 Commonwealth Games

Personal information
- Nationality: British/Somalian
- Born: Qoryoley, Soamlia

Sport
- Sport: Athletics
- Event: middle-distance
- Club: Sheffield RC; Hillsborough College
Medal record
Representing Great Britain
Men's athletics
European Indoor Championships
Bronze medal – third place	2013 Gothenburg	800 m

Mukhtar Mohammed (born 1 December 1990) is a Somali-born British former middle-distance runner specialising in the 800 metres. He was active internationally between 2011 and 2016.

== Biography ==
Mohammed, born in Qoryoley, Somalia, first came to international attention winning the bronze medal in the 800 metres at the 2011 European under-23 Athletics Championships. In 2013, he made his senior breakthrough, gaining a bronze medal in the 800 metres at the 2013 European Athletics Indoor Championships.

He competed at the 2012 European Championships, the 2014 World Indoor Championships, the 2014 Commonwealth Games and the 2015 European Indoor Championships without reaching the final. His personal best time was 1:45.67 minutes, achieved in July 2013 in London.

He finished runner-up three times at the British Athletics Championships from 2012 to 2014.
