= Stepan Poistogov =

Russian middle-distance runner

Personal information
- Nationality: Russian
- Born: 14 December 1986 (age 38)

Sport
- Sport: Track and field
- Event: 800m

Stepan Poistogov (born 14 December 1986) is a Russian middle-distance runner. He competed in the 800 metre event at the 2014 IAAF World Indoor Championships. He was married to fellow middle-distance runner Ekaterina Poistogova.
