= Giordano Benedetti =

Italian middle distance runner

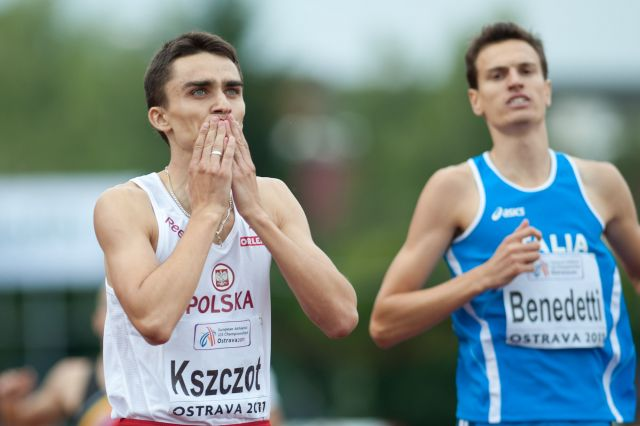
- Giordano Benedetti (right) at 2011 European Athletics U23 Championships

Personal information
- Nationality: Italian
- Born: 22 May 1989 (age 37) Trento, Italy
- Height: 1.89 m (6 ft 2 1/2 in)
- Weight: 67 kg (148 lb)

Sport
- Country: Italy
- Sport: Athletics
- Event: 800 metres
- Club: G.S. Fiamme Gialle
- Coached by: Gianni Benedetti

Achievements and titles
- Personal bests: 800 m outdoor: 1:44.67 (2013); 800 m indoor: 1:47.60 (2013)

Giordano Benedetti (born 22 May 1989 in Trento) is an Italian middle-distance runner (800 m).

In his career, he has won the national championships seven times. He has 7 caps for the senior national team since 2009 Mediterranean Games. His personal best is 1:44.67 (6th best Italian crono of all time), set on 6 June 2013 in Rome at Golden Gala.

== International competitions ==
| Year | Competition | Venue | Position | Event | Notes |
|---|---|---|---|---|---|
| 2008 | World Junior Championships | Bydgoszcz, Poland | 6th | 800 metres | 1:50.65 |
| 2010 | European Championships | Barcelona, Spain | Semi-Finals | 800 metres | 1:49.33 |
| 2011 | European U23 Championships | Ostrava, Czech Republic | 4th | 800 metres | 1:48.65 |

== National titles ==
He has won 10 times the individual national championship.

- 5 wins in 800 metres at the Italian Athletics Championships (2011, 2012, 2014, 2015, 2016)
- 5 wins in 800 metres at the Italian Athletics Indoor Championships (2010, 2011, 2012, 2013, 2014)

== See also ==
- Italian all-time lists – 800 metres
