= 2012 World Junior Championships in Athletics – Men's 400 metres =

The men's 400 metres at the 2012 World Junior Championships in Athletics will be held at the Estadi Olímpic Lluís Companys on 10, 11, and 12 July.

== Medalists ==
Gold	Luguelín Santos; Dominican Republic
Silver	Arman Hall; United States
Bronze	Steven Solomon; Australia
Bronze	Aldrich Bailey; United States

== Records ==
Prior to the competition, the existing world junior and championship records were as follows.

World Junior Record	Steve Lewis (USA)	43.87	Seoul, South Korea	28 September 1988
Championship Record	Hamdan Al-Bishi (KSA)	44.66	Santiago, Chile	20 October 2000
World Junior Leading	Luguelín Santos (DOM)	44.45	Hengelo, Netherlands	27 May 2012

== Results ==
=== Heats ===
Qualification: The first 2 of each heat (Q) and the 8 fastest times (q) qualified

Rank	Heat	Lane	Name	Nationality	Time	Note
1	6	8	Arman Hall	United States	46.13	Q
2	1	5	Boniface Ontuga Mweresa	Kenya	46.16	Q
2	7	5	Steven Solomon	Australia	46.16	Q
4	4	3	Alphas Leken Kishoyian	Kenya	46.22	Q
5	6	7	Mateo Ružic	Croatia	46.30	Q, PB
6	5	5	Javon Francis	Jamaica	46.31	Q, PB
6	6	3	Michele Tricca	Italy	46.31	q, SB
8	5	2	Luguelín Santos	Dominican Republic	46.34	Q
9	8	4	Aldrich Bailey	United States	46.40	Q
10	7	4	Julio Arenas	Spain	46.42	Q, PB
11	7	3	José Meléndez	Venezuela	46.45	q, PB
12	2	6	Machel Cedenio	Trinidad and Tobago	46.58	Q
13	5	7	Andrew Whyte	New Zealand	46.62	q, PB
14	2	5	O'Jay Ferguson	Bahamas	46.69	Q
15	8	8	Pieter Conradie	South Africa	46.70	Q
16	6	4	Daniel Gyasi	Ghana	46.85	q, PB
17	1	2	Patryk Dobek	Poland	46.90	Q
18	3	2	Stephan James	Guyana	46.99	Q, NJ
18	5	6	Sorin Vatamanu	Romania	46.99	q
20	4	9	Jarryd Buchan	Australia	47.04	Q
21	8	5	Basheer Atiah Al Barakati	Saudi Arabia	47.07	q, PB
22	1	6	Marco Lorenzi	Italy	47.19	q
23	8	3	Nikita Vesnin	Russia	47.22	q
24	7	8	Lennox Williams	Jamaica	47.31	
25	3	8	Nikita Uglov	Russia	47.37	Q
25	7	9	Rafał Smoleń	Poland	47.37	
27	8	2	Shaquille Dill	Bermuda	47.38	
28	1	4	Sondre Nyvold Lid	Norway	47.40	
29	1	7	Talbert Poleon	Saint Lucia	47.45	
30	3	7	Diego Palomeque	Colombia	47.55	
31	4	6	Ruan Greyling	South Africa	47.65	
32	4	8	Bandar Atiyah Kaabi	Saudi Arabia	47.79	
33	6	6	Luis Alonso Murillo	Costa Rica	47.85	
34	5	3	Lucka Raherindrainy	Madagascar	47.90	PB
35	7	2	Asa Guevara	Trinidad and Tobago	47.93	
36	3	5	Kazushi Kimura	Japan	47.98	
37	8	1	Oleksiy Pozdnyakov	Ukraine	48.00	
38	5	1	Kenta Kimura	Japan	48.03	
38	6	9	José Ricardo Jiménez	Mexico	48.03	
40	3	3	Benjamin Ayesu-Attah	Canada	48.08	
41	3	9	Roy Ravana	Fiji	48.17	
42	6	2	Elroy McBride	Bahamas	48.18	
43	5	9	Dávid Bartha	Hungary	48.32	
44	1	8	Marc-André Alexandre	Canada	48.37	
45	2	7	Jani Koskela	Finland	48.46	
46	8	9	Kwame Donyinah	Ghana	48.55	
47	2	4	Chin Hui Ng	Singapore	48.56	
48	1	9	Alexander Rohani	Iran	48.59	
49	4	7	Alexandru Babian	Moldova	48.63	
50	1	3	Sumit Malik	India	48.82	
50	4	5	Miloš Raovic	Serbia	48.82	
52	5	4	Victor Soares	Portugal	48.93	
52	8	6	Brandon Valentine-Parris	Saint Vincent and the Grenadines	48.93	PB
54	4	4	Lucas Bua	Spain	48.94	
55	2	3	Mohamedine Mahamadou	Niger	49.05	
56	2	2	D. Madushanka Ranasinghearachchilage	Sri Lanka	49.43	
57	2	8	José Fernando Martínez	Mexico	49.71	
58	5	8	Marcio Cruz	Nicaragua	50.77	PB
59	7	7	Abdelkhedere Abdelrahaman Abdelbassit	Chad	50.80	PB
60	3	4	Mohammed Al Shueili	Oman	51.04	
	6	5	John Rivan	Papua New Guinea	DQ	
	7	6	Andreas Roth	Norway	DNF	
	2	9	Sadam Suliman Koumi	Sudan	DNS	
	3	6	Mohamed Belbachir	Algeria	DNS	
	4	2	Madunta Chukwuma	Nigeria	DNS	
	8	7	Gedeon Tshimanga Mutombo	Democratic Republic of the Congo	DNS	

=== Semi-final ===
Qualification: The first 2 of each heat (Q) and the 2 fastest times (q) qualified

Rank	Heat	Lane	Name	Nationality	Time	Note
1	3	4	Aldrich Bailey	United States	45.79	Q
2	1	7	Luguelín Santos	Dominican Republic	45.98	Q
3	3	5	Javon Francis	Jamaica	46.06	Q, PB
4	1	4	Steven Solomon	Australia	46.07	Q
5	3	5	Boniface Ontuga Mweresa	Kenya	46.20	q
6	2	4	Arman Hall	United States	46.42	Q
7	1	6	Alphas Leken Kishoyian	Kenya	46.46	q (*)
8	1	8	Nikita Uglov	Russia	46.49	q
9	3	2	Patryk Dobek	Poland	46.56	
10	2	6	Machel Cedenio	Trinidad and Tobago	46.59	Q
11	2	2	Andrew Whyte	New Zealand	46.81	
12	3	9	Jarryd Buchan	Australia	46.81	PB
13	2	8	José Meléndez	Venezuela	46.83	
14	2	9	Pieter Conradie	South Africa	46.87	
15	1	9	Michele Tricca	Italy	46.92	
16	2	7	O'Jay Ferguson	Bahamas	47.02	
17	3	6	Marco Lorenzi	Italy	47.25	
18	2	5	Stephan James	Guyana	47.35	
19	1	5	Mateo Ružic	Croatia	47.46	
20	1	3	Basheer Atiah Al Barakati	Saudi Arabia	47.48	
21	3	4	Daniel Gyasi	Ghana	47.78	
22	2	3	Nikita Vesnin	Russia	48.02	
23	1	2	Sorin Vatamanu	Romania	48.15	
24	3	4	Julio Arenas	Spain	50.00	

*Alphas Leken Kishoyian had originally finished in 48.39, the last in his heat, but, since the starter's gun had fired before he settled in his blocks, a rerun was ordered in which he had to run by himself faster than 46.49, the time of the last fastest loser. He succeeded and was given the place in the final.

=== Final ===
Rank	Lane	Name	Nationality	Time	Note
1st place, gold medalist(s)	6	Luguelín Santos	Dominican Republic	44.85	
2nd place, silver medalist(s)	4	Arman Hall	United States	45.39	PB
3rd place, bronze medalist(s)	8	Steven Solomon	Australia	45.52	PB
3rd place, bronze medalist(s)	5	Aldrich Bailey	United States	45.52	
5	9	Machel Cedenio	Trinidad and Tobago	46.17	
6	1	Alphas Leken Kishoyian	Kenya	46.19	
7	3	Boniface Ontuga Mweresa	Kenya	46.50	
8	2	Nikita Uglov	Russia	46.61	
9	7	Javon Francis	Jamaica	47.57	

== Participation ==
According to an unofficial count, 62 athletes from 45 countries participated in the event.

- Australia (2)
- Bahamas (2)
- Bermuda (1)
- Canada (2)
- Chad (1)
- Colombia (1)
- Costa Rica (1)
- Croatia (1)
- Dominican Republic (1)
- Fiji (1)
- Finland (1)
- Ghana (2)
- Guyana (1)
- Hungary (1)
- India (1)
- Iran (1)
- Italy (2)
- Jamaica (2)
- Japan (2)
- Kenya (2)
- Madagascar (1)
- Mexico (2)
- Moldova (1)
- New Zealand (1)
- Nicaragua (1)
- Niger (1)
- Norway (2)
- Oman (1)
- Papua New Guinea (1)
- Poland (2)
- Portugal (1)
- Romania (1)
- Russia (2)
- Saint Lucia (1)
- Saint Vincent and the Grenadines (1)
- Saudi Arabia (2)
- Serbia (1)
- Singapore (1)
- South Africa (2)
- Spain (2)
- Sri Lanka (1)
- Trinidad and Tobago (2)
- Ukraine (1)
- United States (2)
- Venezuela (1)
