= 2017 Italian Athletics Championships =

- Dates: 30 June – 1 July
- Host city: Trieste
- Level: Senior
- Events: 42

The 2017 Italian Athletics Championships was the 107th edition of the Italian Athletics Championships and were held in Trieste on 30 June to 1 July 2017.

== Champions ==
Track events
Event	Men	Performance	Women	Performance
100 m	Federico Cattaneo	10.24w	Irene Siragusa	11.35
200 m	Fausto Desalu	20.32w	Gloria Hooper	23.14
400 m	Davide Re	46.07	Benedicta Chigbolu	52.31
800 m	Stefano Migliorati	1:49.85	Yusneysi Santiusti	2:02.80
1500 m	Joao Bussotti	3:46.12	Giulia Aprile	4:20.56
5000 m	Najibe Salami	14:06.59	Valeria Roffino	16:30.47
4 × 100 m relay	Gruppi Sportivi Fiamme Gialle; Lorenzo Valentini; Eseosa Desalu; Diego Marani; Delmas Obou	40.03		
4 × 400 m relay	Gruppi Sportivi Fiamme Gialle; Marco Lorenzi; Michele Tricca; Lorenzo Valentini; Davide Re	3:06.90		
110/100 m hs	Lorenzo Perini	13.54w	Micol Cattaneo	13.20
400 m hs	Lorenzo Vergani	49.36	Yadisleidy Pedroso	55.09
3000 m st	Ala Zoghlami	8:36.42	Francesca Bertoni	9:56.96
10,000 m walk (tracks)	Federico Tontodonati	40:34.09	Eleonora Giorgi	43:56.95
Field events
Event	Men	Performance	Women	Performance
Long jump	Filippo Randazzo	7.95	Laura Strati	6.59
Triple jump	Daniele Cavazzani	16.40	Dariya Derkach	13.77
High jump	Eugenio Meloni	2.21	Erika Furlani	1.88
Pole vault	Giorgio Piantella	5.40	Elisa Molinarolo	4.25
Shot put	Sebastiano Bianchetti	19.74	Chiara Rosa	16.67
Discus throw	Hannes Kirchler	60.50	Stefania Strumillo	56.15
Hammer throw	Marco Lingua	73.84	Sara Fantini	66.81
Javelin throw	Mauro Fraresso	77.36	Zahra Bani	59.01

== See also ==
- 2017 Italian Athletics Indoor Championships
