= 2013 European Athletics U23 Championships – Men's 400 metres =

The Men's 400 metres event at the 2013 European Athletics U23 Championships was held in Tampere, Finland, at Ratina Stadium on 11 and 12 July.

== Medalists ==
Gold	Lev Mosin; Russia
Silver	Vitaliy Butrym; Ukraine
Bronze	Nikita Uglov; Russia

== Results ==
=== Final ===
12 July 2013

Rank	Name	Nationality	Lane	Reaction Time	Time	Notes
1st place, gold medalist(s)	Lev Mosin	Russia	3	0.158	45.51	PB
2nd place, silver medalist(s)	Vitaliy Butrym	Ukraine	6	0.157	45.88	PB
3rd place, bronze medalist(s)	Nikita Uglov	Russia	4	0.187	46.04	SB
4	Bram Peters	Netherlands	7	0.146	46.05	
5	Jürgen Wielart	Netherlands	5	0.178	46.35	
6	Daniel Němeček	Czech Republic	8	0.168	46.47	SB
7	Richard Morrissey	Ireland	1	0.158	46.61	
8	Sorin Vatamanu	Romania	2	0.170	47.80	

=== Heats ===
Qualified: First 2 in each heat (Q) and 2 best performers (q) advance to the Final

==== Summary ====
Rank	Name	Nationality	Time	Notes
1	Lev Mosin	Russia	46.20	Q
2	Jürgen Wielart	Netherlands	46.26	Q PB
3	Nikita Uglov	Russia	46.35	Q
4	Richard Morrissey	Ireland	46.57	q PB
5	Sorin Vatamanu	Romania	46.58	q
6	Vitaliy Butrym	Ukraine	46.67	Q
7	Bram Peters	Netherlands	46.67	Q
8	Daniel Němeček	Czech Republic	46.71	Q
9	Johannes Trefz	Germany	46.97	
10	Samuel García	Spain	46.98	
10	Marco Lorenzi	Italy	46.98	
12	Lorenzo Valentini	Italy	47.03	
13	Bertrán Alcaraz	Spain	47.11	
14	Michele Tricca	Italy	47.16	
15	Jānis Baltušs	Latvia	47.43	=SB
16	Dara Kervick	Ireland	47.44	
17	Florin Purcea	Romania	47.75	
18	Axel Bergrahm	Sweden	47.99	
19	Nika Kartavtsev	Georgia	48.98	
	Andreas Roth	Norway	DNF	

==== Details ====
===== Heat 1 =====
11 July 2013 / 20:00

Rank	Name	Nationality	Lane	Reaction Time	Time	Notes
1	Vitaliy Butrym	Ukraine	3	0.172	46.67	Q
2	Bram Peters	Netherlands	2	0.157	46.67	Q
3	Samuel García	Spain	4	0.186	46.98	
4	Michele Tricca	Italy	6	0.217	47.16	
5	Dara Kervick	Ireland	5	0.178	47.44	
6	Axel Bergrahm	Sweden	7	0.202	47.99	

===== Heat 2 =====
11 July 2013 / 20:08

Rank	Name	Nationality	Lane	Reaction Time	Time	Notes
1	Jürgen Wielart	Netherlands	8	0.181	46.26	Q PB
2	Nikita Uglov	Russia	4	0.189	46.35	Q
3	Richard Morrissey	Ireland	3	0.152	46.57	q PB
4	Sorin Vatamanu	Romania	6	0.175	46.58	q
5	Lorenzo Valentini	Italy	7	0.189	47.03	
6	Jānis Baltušs	Latvia	5	0.178	47.43	=SB
7	Nika Kartavtsev	Georgia	2	0.212	48.98	

===== Heat 3 =====
11 July 2013 / 20:16

Rank	Name	Nationality	Lane	Reaction Time	Time	Notes
1	Lev Mosin	Russia	3	0.172	46.20	Q
2	Daniel Němeček	Czech Republic	6	0.169	46.71	Q
3	Johannes Trefz	Germany	7	0.168	46.97	
4	Marco Lorenzi	Italy	4	0.205	46.98	
5	Bertrán Alcaraz	Spain	5	0.196	47.11	
6	Florin Purcea	Romania	2	0.157	47.75	
	Andreas Roth	Norway	8	0.213	DNF	

== Participation ==
According to an unofficial count, 20 athletes from 13 countries participated in the event.

- Czech Republic (1)
- Georgia (1)
- Germany (1)
- Ireland (2)
- Italy (3)
- Latvia (1)
- Netherlands (2)
- Norway (1)
- Romania (2)
- Russia (2)
- Spain (2)
- Sweden (1)
- Ukraine (1)
