= Andreas Roth (runner) =

Norwegian middle-distance runner

Per Andreas Roth (born 29 April 1993) is a Norwegian middle-distance runner specialising in the 400 and later 800 metres.

While running the 400 metres he competed at the 2012 World Junior Championships and the 2013 European U23 Championships without reaching the final, and also in the 4 × 400 metres relay at the 2012 World Junior Championships and three European Team Championships.

In the 800 metres, he competed at the 2014 European Championships and the 2015 European Indoor Championships without reaching the final, before clocking in fifth at the 2015 European U23 Championships. He retired in 2017, but continued as a pacemaker on national level, among others at the Bislett Games.

Roth became Norwegian 400 m champion in 2013, also winning silver medals in 2011 and 2014, and then won the 800 metres in 2015 with silver medals in 2014, 2016 and 2017. His personal best times were 47.37 seconds in the 400 metres and 1:49.84 minutes in the 800 metres, both achieved in 2013.

His brother Thomas is also a runner. They hail from Sand and represent the club Ullensaker/Kisa IL.
