= 2013 European Athletics U23 Championships – Men's 4 × 400 metres relay =

The Men's 4x400 metres relay event at the 2013 European Athletics U23 Championships was held in Tampere, Finland, at Ratina Stadium on 13 and 14 July.

== Medalists ==
| Gold | Seppe Thijs; Dylan Borlée; Stef Vanhaeren; Julien Watrin; Sébastien Lins^{†} Belgium |
| Silver | Vito Incantalupo; Lorenzo Valentini; Marco Lorenzi; Michele Tricca; Italy |
| Bronze | Philipp Kleemann; Johannes Trefz; Benedikt Wiesend; Stefan Gorol; Jannik Rehbein^{†} Germany |

^{†}: Competed only in heat.

== Results ==
=== Final ===
14 July 2013 / 18:55

| Rank | Name | Nationality | Lane | Reaction Time | Time | Notes |
|---|---|---|---|---|---|---|
| 1st place, gold medalist(s) | Belgium | Seppe Thijs; Dylan Borlée; Stef Vanhaeren; Julien Watrin | 3 | 0.188 | 3:04.90 | |
| 2nd place, silver medalist(s) | Italy | Vito Incantalupo; Lorenzo Valentini; Marco Lorenzi; Michele Tricca | 4 | 0.159 | 3:05.10 | |
| 3rd place, bronze medalist(s) | Germany | Philipp Kleemann; Johannes Trefz; Benedikt Wiesend; Stefan Gorol | 8 | 0.184 | 3:05.24 | |
| 4 | Spain | Bertrán Alcaraz; Juan Manuel García; Samuel García; Bruno Hortelano | 2 | 0.194 | 3:05.28 | |
| 5 | Czech Republic | Michal Desenský; Pavel Maslák; Patrik Šorm; Daniel Němeček | 7 | 0.224 | 3:05.82 | |
| 6 | Netherlands | Bram Peters; Thijmen Kupers; Jesper Arts; Jelle Venema | 1 | 0.164 | 3:07.47 | |
| 7 | Ukraine | Dmytro Bezpamyatnyy; Taras Bybyk; Anatoliy Sinyanskyy; Vitaliy Butrym | 5 | 0.233 | 3:20.10 | |
| DQ | Russia | Lev Mosin; Denis Nesmashnyi; Artem Vazhov; Nikita Uglov | 6 | | | |

=== Heats ===
Qualified: First 3 in each heat (Q) and 2 best performers (q) advance to the Final

==== Summary ====
| Rank | Nation | Time | Notes |
|---|---|---|---|
| 1 | Italy | 3:06.98 | Q |
| 2 | Belgium | 3:07.09 | Q |
| 3 | Germany | 3:07.21 | Q |
| 4 | Spain | 3:07.23 | q |
| 5 | Netherlands | 3:07.27 | q |
| 6 | Ireland | 3:07.71 | |
| 7 | Russia | 3:09.33 | Q |
| 8 | Ukraine | 3:10.14 | Q |
| 9 | Czech Republic | 3:11.60 | Q |
| 10 | Romania | 3:12.72 | |
| 11 | Israel | 3:16.27 | |
| 12 | Georgia | 3:19.58 | |
| | Norway | DNF | |

==== Details ====
===== Heat 1 =====
13 July 2013 / 12:00

| Rank | Nation | Competitors | Lane | Reaction Time | Time | Notes |
|---|---|---|---|---|---|---|
| 1 | Russia | Kirill Ryzhov; Yegor Kibakin; Denis Nesmashnyi; Artem Vazhov | 4 | 0.211 | 3:09.33 | Q |
| 2 | Ukraine | Vitaliy Butrym; Taras Bybyk; Anatoliy Sinyanskyy; Dmytro Bezpamyatnyy | 6 | 0.170 | 3:10.14 | Q |
| 3 | Czech Republic | Michal Desenský; Patrik Šorm; Miroslav Burian; Daniel Němeček | 3 | 0.217 | 3:11.60 | Q |
| 4 | Israel | Dayan Aviv; Maor Szeged; Amit Cohen; Hai Cohen | 5 | 0.188 | 3:16.27 | |
| 5 | Georgia | Iosebi Marukashvili; Denis Zhvania; Bachana Khorava; Nika Kartavtsev | 7 | 0.216 | 3:19.58 | |
| | Norway | Carl Emil Kåshagen; Thomas Roth; Marius Bakke Støle; Per Magne Florvaag | 2 | 0.193 | DNF | |

===== Heat 2 =====
13 July 2013 / 12:10

| Rank | Nation | Competitors | Lane | Reaction Time | Time | Notes |
|---|---|---|---|---|---|---|
| 1 | Italy | Vito Incantalupo; Lorenzo Valentini; Marco Lorenzi; Michele Tricca | 3 | 0.156 | 3:06.98 | Q |
| 2 | Belgium | Seppe Thijs; Sébastien Lins; Stef Vanhaeren; Dylan Borlée | 5 | 0.188 | 3:07.09 | Q |
| 3 | Germany | Philipp Kleemann; Benedikt Wiesend; Jannik Rehbein; Stefan Gorol | 4 | 0.188 | 3:07.21 | Q |
| 4 | Spain | Bertrán Alcaraz; Juan Manuel García; Samuel García; Alejandro Estévez | 8 | 0.251 | 3:07.23 | q |
| 5 | Netherlands | Jürgen Wielart; Thijmen Kupers; Jesper Arts; Bram Peters | 2 | 0.205 | 3:07.27 | q |
| 6 | Ireland | Dara Kervick; Jason Harvey; Richard Morrissey; Mark English | 6 | 0.196 | 3:07.71 | |
| 7 | Romania | Marian Cristinel Glisca; Florin Purcea; Tiberiu Alexandru Baneasu; Sorin Vatamanu | 7 | 0.186 | 3:12.72 | |

== Participation ==
According to an unofficial count, 59 athletes from 13 countries participated in the event.

- Belgium (5)
- Czech Republic (5)
- Georgia (4)
- Germany (5)
- Ireland (4)
- Israel (4)
- Italy (4)
- Netherlands (5)
- Norway (4)
- Romania (4)
- Russia (6)
- Spain (5)
- Ukraine (4)
