= Athletics at the 2010 Summer Youth Olympics – Boys' 400 metres =

Athletics – Boys' 400 metres at the I Summer Youth Olympic Games
- Venue: Bishan Stadium
- Date: August 17–21
- Competitors: 29 from 29 nations

Medalists
1st place, gold medalist(s)		Luguelín Santos	Dominican Republic
2nd place, silver medalist(s)		Ruan Greyling	South Africa
3rd place, bronze medalist(s)		Alphas Kishoyian	Kenya

The boys' 400 metres competition at the 2010 Youth Olympic Games was held on 17–21 August 2010 in Bishan Stadium.

== Schedule ==
Date	Time	Round
17 August 2010	11:30	Heats
21 August 2010	09:50	Final

== Records ==
Prior to the competition, the following records were as follows.

World Youth Best	Obea Moore (USA)	45.14	Santiago, Chile	2 September 1995
Championship Record	None			
World Youth Leading	Luguelín Santos (DOM)	46.19	Santo Domingo, DOM	26 June 2010

No new records were set during the competition.

== Results ==
=== Heats ===
Rank	Heat	Lane	Athlete	Time	Notes	Q
1	4	5	Luguelín Santos (DOM)	46.82		FA
2	2	4	Lukas Schmitz (GER)	47.27		FA
3	3	3	Sadam Elnour (SUD)	47.37		FA
4	1	3	Nikita Uglov (RUS)	47.43		FA
5	4	4	Ruan Greyling (RSA)	47.60	PB	FA
6	3	5	Alphas Kishoyian (KEN)	47.79		FA
7	1	4	Najee Glass (USA)	47.83		FA
8	3	4	Leandro de Araújo (BRA)	48.23		FA
9	2	5	Marco Lorenzi (ITA)	48.40		FB
10	1	6	Shaquille Alleyne (BAR)	48.68		FB
11	3	6	Golden Gunde (MAW)	48.68	=PB	FB
12	1	5	Simon Lawrence (DMA)	48.82		FB
13	2	6	Sebastian Wiszniewski (POL)	48.83		FB
14	2	3	Abdullah Ahmed Abkar (KSA)	49.18		FB
15	4	3	Choi Dong-baek (KOR)	49.20		FB
16	4	7	Luke Greco (AUS)	50.82		FC
17	1	7	Fousseyni Tamboura (MLI)	50.96		FC
18	3	2	Omar Ceesay (GAM)	52.09		FC
19	4	6	Lennox Williams (JAM)	52.27		FC
20	2	2	Jimmy Thoronka (SLE)	52.83		FC
21	4	8	Jalil Salmon (ANT)	53.55		FC
22	1	2	Davy Julien Edou (GAB)	53.59		FC
23	2	7	David Walter (ISV)	53.90		FD
24	4	2	Stanley Sipolo (SOL)	54.53		FD
25	3	7	Michael Gaitan (GUM)	55.07		FD
26	1	1	Maima Moiya (TUV)	1:03.28		FD
	1	8	Yorghena Embole Mokulu (COD)	DNF		FD
	2	8	Rosen Daniel (LCA)	DNF		FD
	3	8	Djato Emmanuel (CHA)	DSQ		FD

=== Finals ===
==== Final A ====
Rank	Lane	Athlete	Time	Notes
1st place, gold medalist(s)	6	Luguelín Santos (DOM)	47.11	
2nd place, silver medalist(s)	8	Ruan Greyling (RSA)	47.22	PB
3rd place, bronze medalist(s)	7	Alphas Kishoyian (KEN)	47.24	PB
4	4	Sadam Elnour (SUD)	47.32	
5	2	Leandro de Araújo (BRA)	47.59	PB
6	1	Najee Glass (USA)	47.65	
7	3	Nikita Uglov (RUS)	48.15	
8	5	Lukas Schmitz (GER)	48.70	

==== Final B ====
Rank	Lane	Athlete	Time	Notes
1	5	Marco Lorenzi (ITA)	48.31	
2	3	Shaquille Alleyne (BAR)	48.35	
3	6	Choi Dong-baek (KOR)	48.42	PB
4	8	Sebastian Wiszniewski (POL)	48.45	
5	7	Abdullah Ahmed Abkar (KSA)	48.51	
6	6	Golden Gunde (MAW)	48.71	
7	4	Simon Lawrence (DMA)	49.26	

==== Final C ====
Rank	Lane	Athlete	Time	Notes
1	4	Omar Ceesay (GAM)	50.07	SB
2	6	Luke Greco (AUS)	50.76	
3	3	Fousseyni Tamboura (MLI)	51.01	
4	7	Jalil Salmon (ANT)	52.58	
5	2	Davy Julien Edou (GAB)	54.15	
	8	Jimmy Thoronka (SLE)	DSQ	
	5	Lennox Williams (JAM)	DNS	

==== Final D ====
Rank	Lane	Athlete	Time	Notes
1	2	Djato Emmanuel (CHA)	51.03	SB
2	8	Yorghena Embole Mokulu (COD)	51.24	
3	3	David Walter (ISV)	52.50	
4	6	Michael Gaitan (GUM)	55.20	
	4	Stanley Sipolo (SOL)	DNS	
	7	Rosen Daniel (LCA)	DNS	
	5	Maima Moiya (TUV)	DNS	
