= 2014 European Athletics Championships – Men's 800 metres =

Men's 800 metres at the European Athletics Championships

The men's 800 metres at the 2014 European Athletics Championships took place at the Letzigrund on 12, 13, and 15 August.

== Medalists ==
Gold	Adam Kszczot; Poland
Silver	Artur Kuciapski; Poland
Bronze	Mark English; Ireland

== Records ==
Standing records prior to the 2014 European Athletics Championships
World record	David Rudisha (KEN)	1:40.91	London, Great Britain	9 August 2012
European record	Wilson Kipketer (DEN)	1:41.11	Cologne, Germany	24 August 1997
Championship record	Olaf Beyer (GDR)	1:43.84	Prague, Czechoslovakia	31 August 1978
World Leading	Nijel Amos (BOT)	1:42.45	Fontvieille, Monaco	18 July 2014
European Leading	Pierre-Ambroise Bosse (FRA)	1:42.53	Fontvieille, Monaco	18 July 2014

== Schedule ==
Date	Time	Round
12 August 2014	19:05	Round 1
13 August 2014	21:08	Semifinals
15 August 2014	19:55	Final

All times are local times (UTC+2)

== Results ==
=== Round 1 ===
First 3 in each heat (Q) and 4 best performers (q) advance to the Semifinals.

Rank	Heat	Lane	Name	Nationality	Time	Note
1	2	1	Mark English	Ireland	1:47.38	Q
2	2	3	Artur Kuciapski	Poland	1:47.45	Q
3	4	5	Andreas Bube	Denmark	1:47.50	Q
4	4	2	Pierre-Ambroise Bosse	France	1:47.54	Q
5	1	6	Marcin Lewandowski	Poland	1:47.83	Q
6	2	6	Paul Renaudie	France	1:47.88	Q
7	4	7	Jozef Repčík	Slovakia	1:47.90	Q
8	3	4	Adam Kszczot	Poland	1:47.92	Q
9	1	3	Kevin López	Spain	1:47.93	Q
10	2	4	Tamás Kazi	Hungary	1:48.05	q
11	4	4	Dennis Krüger	Germany	1:48.06	q
12	3	1	Amel Tuka	Bosnia and Herzegovina	1:48.07	Q
13	4	1	Johan Rogestedt	Sweden	1:48.19	q
14	3	7	Andreas Almgren	Sweden	1:48.22	Q
15	3	2	Giordano Benedetti	Italy	1:48.29	q
16	2	7	Andrew Osagie	Great Britain	1:48.31	
17	1	4	Sofiane Selmouni	France	1:48.46	Q
18	4	3	Michael Rimmer	Great Britain	1:48.51	
19	4	6	Andreas Roth	Norway	1:48.61	
20	1	5	Roald Hagbart Frøskeland	Norway	1:48.62	
21	1	8	Andreas Rapatz	Austria	1:48.65	
22	4	8	Žan Rudolf	Slovenia	1:48.75	
23	3	8	Thomas Roth	Norway	1:48.86	
24	3	5	Hugo Santacruz	Switzerland	1:49.16	
25	2	8	Nikolaus Franzmair	Austria	1:49.18	
26	2	5	Sandy Martins	Portugal	1:49.51	
27	1	1	Thijmen Kupers	Netherlands	1:49.69	
28	3	6	Declan Murray	Ireland	1:50.01	
29	4	8	Luis Alberto Marco	Spain	1:50.07	
30	1	8	Dmitrijs Jurkevičs	Latvia	1:50.12	
31	2	2	Charel Grethen	Luxembourg	1:50.36	
32	1	7	Rickard Gunnarsson	Sweden	1:50.58	
33	3	3	David Fiegen	Luxembourg	1:51.00	
34	1	2	Jan van den Broeck	Belgium	1:52.09	

=== Semifinals ===
First 3 in each heat (Q) and 2 best performers (q) advance to the Final.

Rank	Heat	Lane	Name	Nationality	Time	Note
1	1	5	Pierre-Ambroise Bosse	France	1:45.94	Q
2	1	8	Artur Kuciapski	Poland	1:46.05	Q
3	1	7	Andreas Bube	Denmark	1:46.09	Q, SB
4	1	6	Mark English	Ireland	1:46.23	q
5	1	2	Jozef Repčík	Slovakia	1:46.94	q, SB
6	2	6	Adam Kszczot	Poland	1:47.12	Q
7	2	5	Marcin Lewandowski	Poland	1:47.14	Q
8	2	2	Amel Tuka	Bosnia and Herzegovina	1:47.18	Q
9	2	8	Paul Renaudie	France	1:47.54	
10	1	4	Andreas Almgren	Sweden	1:47.55	
11	2	1	Tamás Kazi	Hungary	1:48.04	
12	2	3	Dennis Krüger	Germany	1:48.33	
13	1	3	Giordano Benedetti	Italy	1:48.58	
14	1	1	Kevin López	Spain	1:48.90	
15	2	4	Sofiane Selmouni	France	1:51.01	
16	2	7	Johan Rogestedt	Sweden	1:53.70	

=== Final ===
Rank	Lane	Name	Nationality	Time	Note
1st place, gold medalist(s)	4	Adam Kszczot	Poland	1:44.15	SB
2nd place, silver medalist(s)	8	Artur Kuciapski	Poland	1:44.89	PB
3rd place, bronze medalist(s)	5	Mark English	Ireland	1:45.03	=SB
4	7	Andreas Bube	Denmark	1:45.21	SB
5	3	Marcin Lewandowski	Poland	1:45.78	
6	2	Amel Tuka	Bosnia and Herzegovina	1:46.12	NR
7	1	Jozef Repčík	Slovakia	1:46.29	SB
8	6	Pierre-Ambroise Bosse	France	1:46.55	
