= Thomas Roth (athlete) =

Norwegian middle-distance runner

Personal information
- Full name: Thomas Arne Roth
- Born: 11 February 1991 (age 34) Sand, Akershus, Norway
- Height: 1.83 m (6 ft 0 in)
- Weight: 68 kg (150 lb)

Sport
- Sport: Athletics
- Event: 800 metres
- Club: Ullensaker/Kisa IL

Thomas Arne Roth (born 11 February 1991 in Sand) is a Norwegian middle-distance runner specialising in the 800 metres. He reached the final at the 2012 European Championships finishing eighth.

His brother, Andreas, is also a runner.

== International competitions ==
Year	Competition	Venue	Position	Event	Notes
Representing Norway
2009	European Junior Championships	Novi Sad, Serbia	12th (sf)	800 m	1:51.53
2010	World Junior Championships	Moncton, Canada	14th (sf)	800 m	1:49.39
2011	European Indoor Championships	Paris, France	21st (h)	800 m	1:51.91
2012	European Championships	Helsinki, Finland	8th	800 m	1:49.54
2013	European U23 Championships	Tampere, Finland	10th (h)	800 m	1:48.88
2013	European U23 Championships	Tampere, Finland	–	4 × 400 m relay	DNF
2014	European Championships	Zürich, Switzerland	23rd (h)	800 m	1:48.86
2015	European Indoor Championships	Prague, Czech Republic	17th (h)	800 m	1:49.73
2018	European Championships	Berlin, Germany	9th (sf)	800 m	1:46.60
2019	European Indoor Championships	Glasgow, United Kingdom	28th (h)	800 m	1:50.42

== Personal bests ==
Outdoor

- 400 metres – 47.93 (Kristiansand 2012)
- 600 metres – 1:18.24 (Nittedal 2014)
- 800 metres – 1:45.75 (Oslo 2018)
- 1000 metres – 2:21.14 (Gothenburg 2015)
- 1500 metres – 3:43.11 (Jessheim 2018)
- One mile – 4:09.03 (Oslo 2015)

Indoor

- 600 metres – 1:20.21 (Stange 2010)
- 800 metres – 1:47.26 (Wien 2015)
- 1000 metres – 2:20.96 (Hvam 2018) NR
- 1500 metres – 3:46.19 (Hvam 2016)
