= Gabon at the 2010 Summer Youth Olympics =

- IOC code: GAB
- NOC: Comité Olympique Gabonais

in Singapore
- Competitors: 2 in 1 sport
- Flag bearer: Jessica Oyane Tome Mbouissou

Summer Youth Olympics appearances
- 2010; 2014; 2018

Gabon is participating in the 2010 Summer Youth Olympics in Singapore.

== Athletics ==
Note: The athletes who do not have a "Q" next to their Qualification Rank advance to a non-medal ranking final.

=== Boys ===
Track and Road Events

Athletes	Event	Qualification		Final	
Athletes	Event	Result	Rank	Result	Rank
Davy Julien Edou	Boys’ 400m	53.59	22 qC	54.15	20

=== Girls ===
Track and Road Events

Athletes	Event	Qualification		Final	
Athletes	Event	Result	Rank	Result	Rank
Jessica Oyane Tome Mbouissou	Girls’ 100m	DSQ qE		13.18	28
