= Taras Bybyk =

Ukrainian middle-distance track athlete (born 1992)

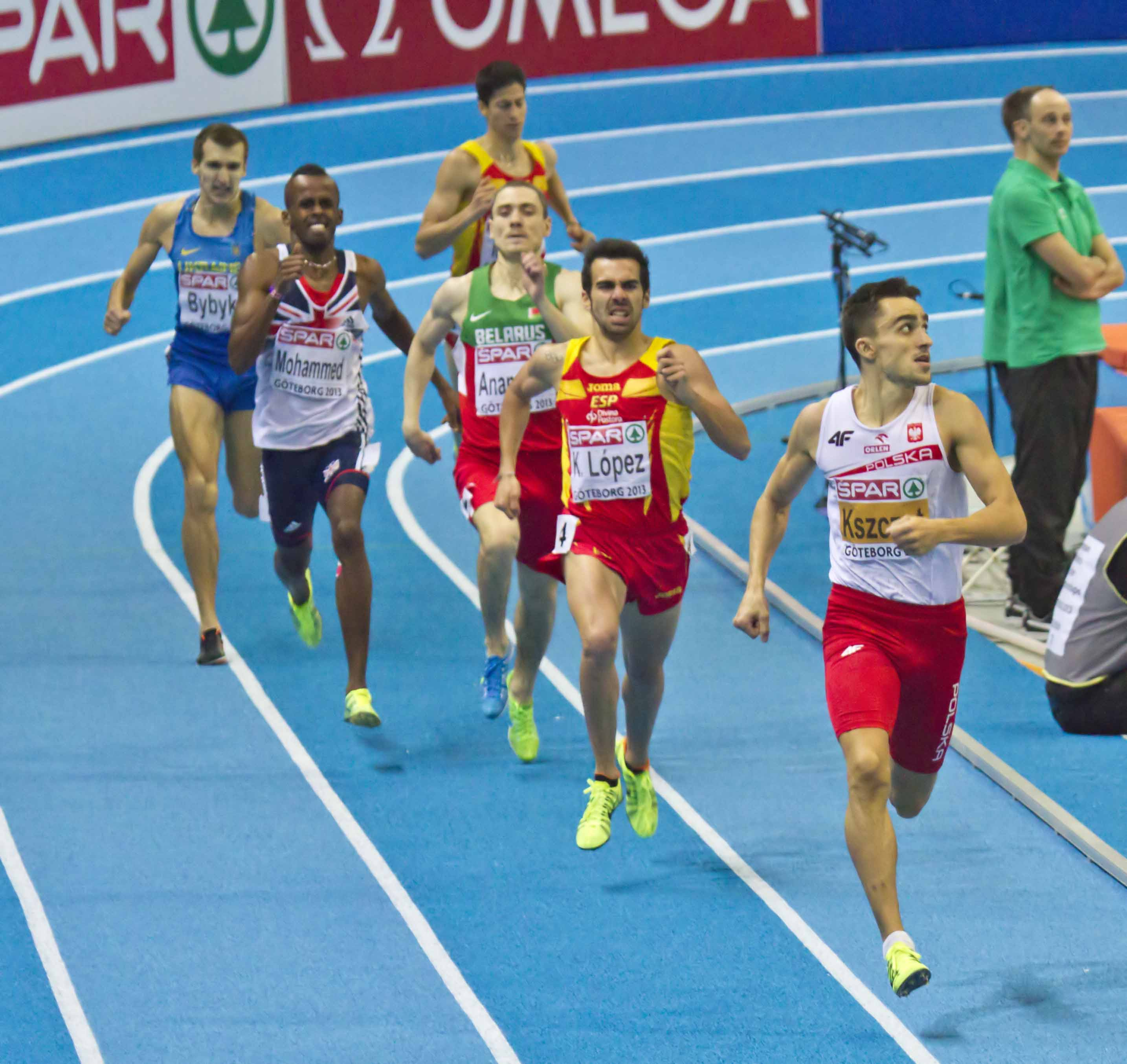

Personal information
- Born: March 27, 1992 (age 34) Chernivtsi, Ukraine

Sport
- Country: Ukraine
- Sport: Track and Field
- Event: 400, 800 metres

Achievements and titles
- Personal best(s): 800 metres: 1.46.20; 400 metres: 47.16
Medal record
Representing Ukraine
Track and Field
European Championship
Silver medal – second place	Tampere 2013	European Championship U23 2013
World Championship
Ukrainian championship
Gold medal – first place	Sumy 2013	Ukrainian championship 2013
Silver medal – second place	Sumy 2012	Ukrainian championship 2012

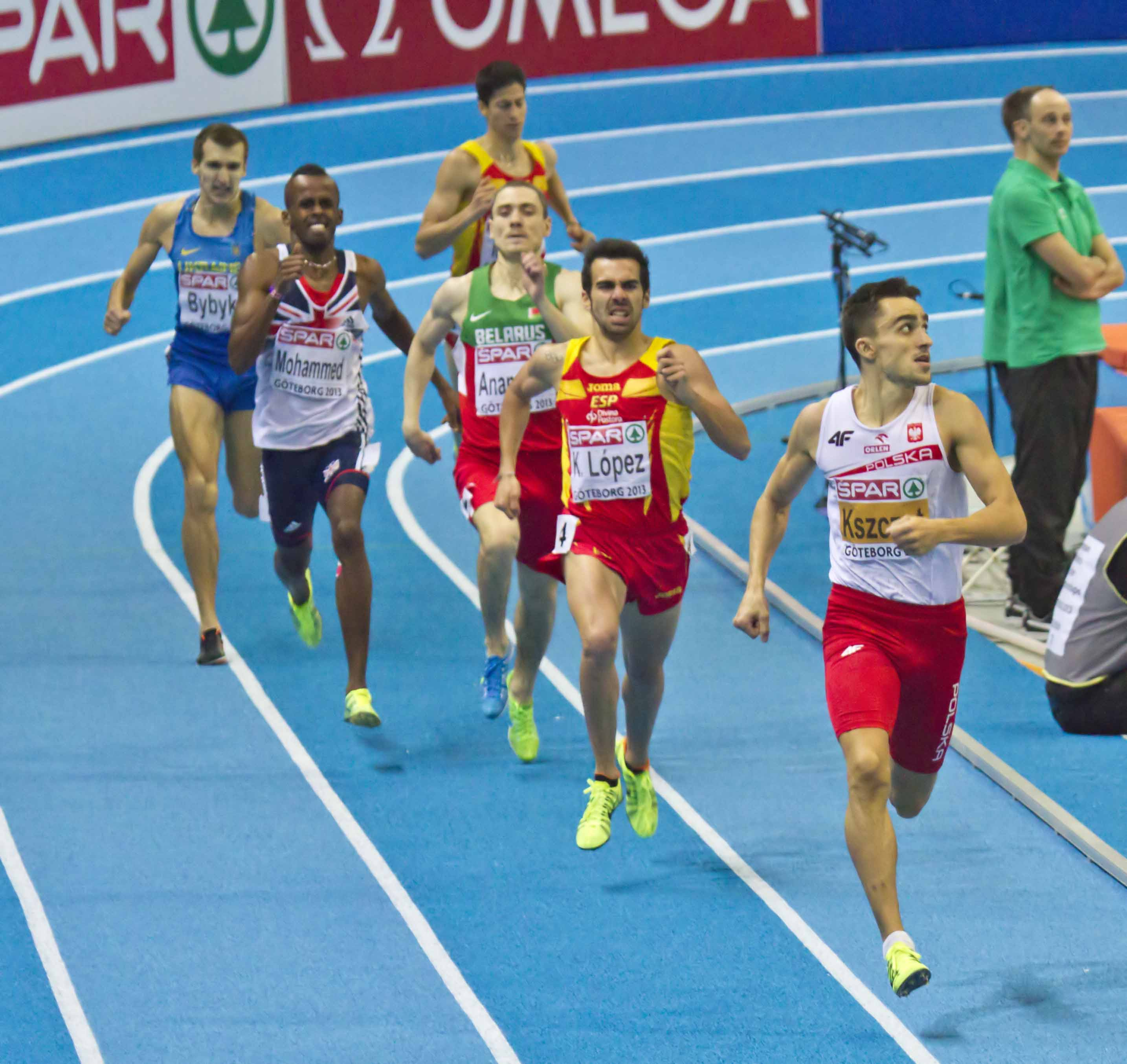
Bybyk (back left) at the European Indoor Championships

Taras Bybyk Igorovych (born 27 March 1992) is a Ukrainian male track and field athlete who competes in the 400 metres and 800 metres.

== Career ==
His greatest achievements came in the 2013 season. He won his first national title indoors then finished fifth at the European Athletics Indoor Championships. He won 800 m silver at the European Athletics U23 Championships before representing Ukraine at the 2013 World Championships in Athletics.

Born in Chernivtsi, he competed in age-category events for his country, including the Gymnasiade, World Junior Championships in Athletics and European Athletics Junior Championships. He stopped competing internationally after 2014.

== International competitions ==
Year	Competition	Venue	Position	Event	Notes
2009	Gymnasiade	QAT Doha, Qatar	(q)	400 m	51.31
2010	World Junior Championships	CAN Moncton, Canada	4th (h)	800 m	1:51.15
2011	European Junior Championships	EST Tallinn, Estonia	(semis)	800 m	1:49.25
2013	European Indoor Championships	SWE Gothenburg, Sweden	5th	800 m	1:50.38
2013	European U23 Championships	FIN Tampere, Finland	2nd	800 m	1:46.20
2013	European U23 Championships	FIN Tampere, Finland	8th	4 × 400 m relay	3:20.10
2013	World Championships	RUS Moscow, Russia	38th (h)	800 m	1:49.39

== National titles ==
- Ukrainian Indoor Championships
  - 800 m: 2013
