= Samir Dahmani =

French middle-distance runner

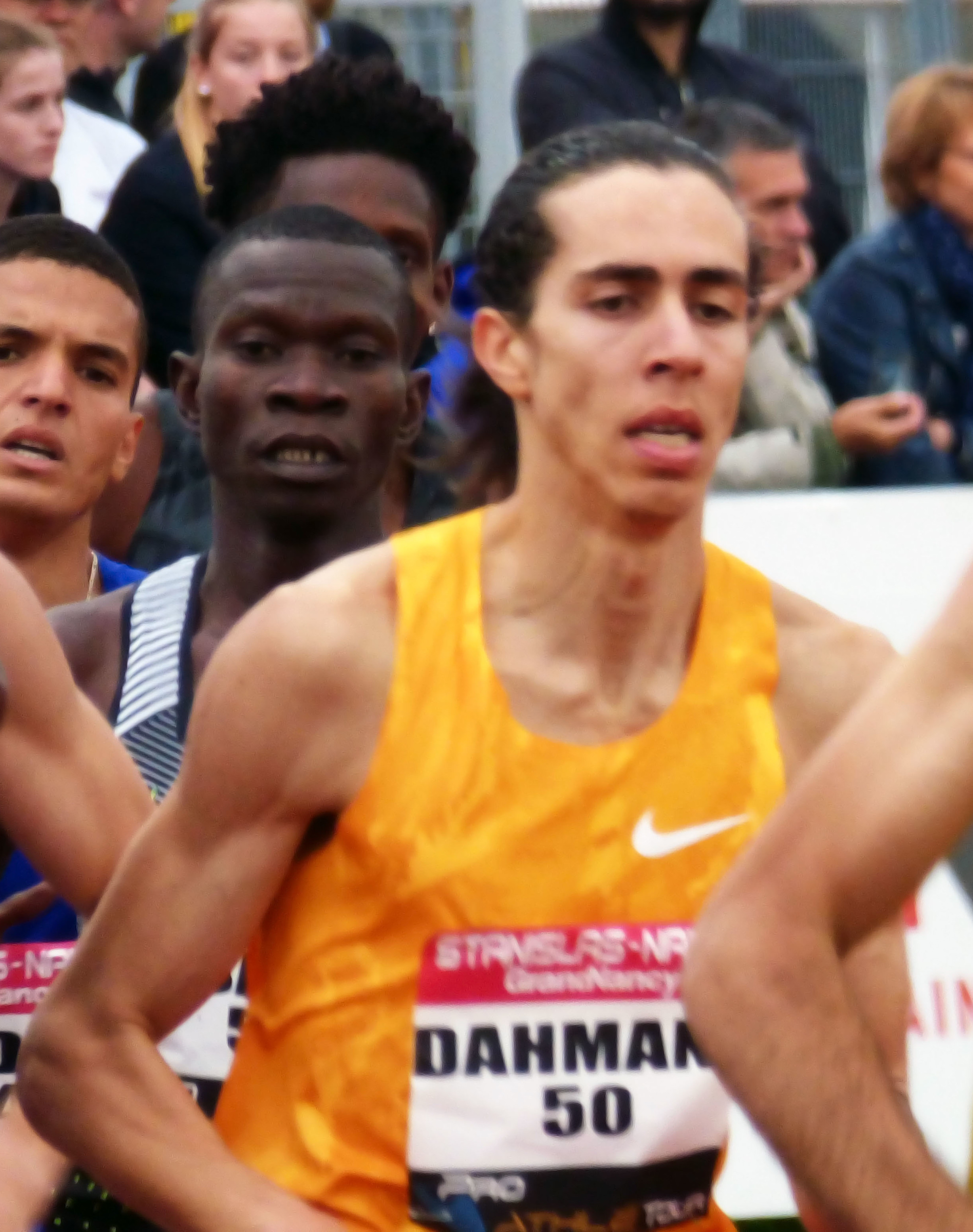

Personal information
- Born: 3 April 1991 (age 34) Martigues, France

Sport
- Sport: Athletics
- Event(s): 800 m, 1500 m
- Club: Martigues Sports Athlé

Samir Dahmani (born 3 April 1991 in Martigues) is a French middle-distance runner. He represented his country in the 800 metres at the 2017 World Championships without qualifying for the semifinals.

== International competitions ==
Year	Competition	Venue	Position	Event	Notes
Representing France
2007	European Youth Olympic Festival	Belgrade, Serbia	3rd	800 m	1:52.39
2009	European Junior Championships	Novi Sad, Serbia	9th	1500 m	3:55.57
2010	World Junior Championships	Moncton, Canada	5th	800 m	1:47.82
2010	World Junior Championships	Moncton, Canada	22nd (h)	1500 m	3:47.89
2011	European U23 Championships	Prague, Czech Republic	14th (h)	800 m	1:49.95
2017	European Indoor Championships	Belgrade, Serbia	19th (h)	3000 m	8:15.90
2017	World Championships	London, United Kingdom	36th (h)	800 m	1:48.62

== Personal bests ==
Outdoor

- 800 metres – 1:44.07 (Paris 2016)
- 1000 metres – 2:21.00 (Montreuil-sous-Bois 2015)
- 1500 metres – 3:37.05 (Paris 2015)
- 3000 metres – 8:20.36 (Montreuil-sous-Bois 2009)

Indoor

- 800 metres – 1:49.13 (Paris 2010)
- 1000 metres – 2:26.24 (Aubiére 2008)
- 1500 metres – 3:41.14 (Sabadell 2016)
- One mile – 4:30.30 (Nampa 2011)
- 2000 metres – 5:11.97 (Ghent 2016)
- 3000 metres – 7:54.47 (Metz 2017)
