= Jimmy Thoronka =

Sierra Leonean sprinter (born 1994)

Personal information
- Born: 6 June 1994 (age 31)

Sport
- Sport: Athletics
- Event(s): 60 metres, 100 metres, 400 meters

Jimmy Thoronka (born 6 June 1994) is a professional sprinter from Sierra Leone. He defected from his native country to live in England after competing in the 2014 Commonwealth Games. His mother and four siblings were killed by ebola, and he was arrested in March 2015 while living on the streets in London for "running while black". He then had a legal battle with the government of the United Kingdom after his application to stay was rejected.

In May 2018, he was allowed to stay in the UK.

== Major international competitions ==
Year	Competition	Venue	Position	Event	Notes
2010	Youth Olympic Games	Singapore	DSQ (Final C)	400 m	DSQ
2014	Commonwealth Games	Glasgow, United Kingdom	6th (Heat 1, Heats)	4 × 100 m	40.55

== Domestic competitions ==
Year	Competition	Venue	Position	Event	Notes
2018	United Kingdom Indoor Championships	Birmingham, United Kingdom	5th (Heat 5, Heats)	60m	7.00
