= 2013 European Athletics U23 Championships – Men's 800 metres =

The Men's 800 metres event at the 2013 European Athletics U23 Championships was held in Tampere, Finland, at Ratina Stadium on 11 and 12 July.

== Medalists ==
Gold	Pierre-Ambroise Bosse; France
Silver	Taras Bybyk; Ukraine
Bronze	Amel Tuka; Bosnia and Herzegovina

== Results ==
=== Final ===
12 July 2013

Rank	Name	Nationality	Lane	Time	Notes
1st place, gold medalist(s)	Pierre-Ambroise Bosse	France	3	1:45.79	
2nd place, silver medalist(s)	Taras Bybyk	Ukraine	7	1:46.20	PB
3rd place, bronze medalist(s)	Amel Tuka	Bosnia and Herzegovina	2	1:46.29	NR
4	Andreas Lange	Germany	6	1:46.40	
5	Alejandro Estévez	Spain	8	1:47.08	PB
6	Thijmen Kupers	Netherlands	5	1:47.15	SB
7	Danyil Strelnikov	Russia	4	1:47.38	
8	Pierre Antoine Balhan	Belgium	1	1:47.74	SB

Intermediate times:
400m: 51.75 Pierre-Ambroise Bosse France
600m: 1:18.19 Pierre-Ambroise Bosse France

=== Heats ===
Qualified: First 2 in each heat (Q) and 2 best performers (q) advance to the Final

==== Summary ====
Rank	Name	Nationality	Time	Notes
1	Taras Bybyk	Ukraine	1:47.63	Q PB
2	Pierre-Ambroise Bosse	France	1:47.76	Q
3	Pierre Antoine Balhan	Belgium	1:47.97	Q
4	Andreas Lange	Germany	1:47.98	Q
5	Danyil Strelnikov	Russia	1:48.20	q
6	Thijmen Kupers	Netherlands	1:48.39	q
7	Filip Ingebrigtsen	Norway	1:48.57	
8	Jacopo Lahbi	Italy	1:48.73	
9	Dennis Krüger	Germany	1:48.87	
10	Thomas Roth	Norway	1:48.88	
11	Alejandro Estévez	Spain	1:49.20	Q
12	Mokat Petna	Israel	1:49.26	PB
13	Amel Tuka	Bosnia and Herzegovina	1:49.41	Q
14	Mark English	Ireland	1:49.65	
15	Soufiane El Kabbouri	Italy	1:49.76	
16	Charles Grethen	Luxembourg	1:50.01	
17	Žan Rudolf	Slovenia	1:50.05	
18	Miroslav Burian	Czech Republic	1:50.52	
19	Pauls Ārents	Latvia	1:50.67	
20	Roland Christen	Switzerland	1:51.14	
21	Rickard Gunnarsson	Sweden	1:51.22	
22	Christos Demetriou	Cyprus	1:51.85	
23	Mattia Moretti	Italy	1:51.90	
24	Johan Rogestedt	Sweden	1:52.81	
25	Renārs Stepiņš	Latvia	1:52.95	
26	Kevin Stadler	Germany	1:53.29	
27	Artur Kuciapski	Poland	1:53.50	

==== Details ====
===== Heat 1 =====
11 July 2013 / 17:30

Rank	Name	Nationality	Lane	Time	Notes
1	Pierre Antoine Balhan	Belgium	4	1:47.97	Q
2	Andreas Lange	Germany	5	1:47.98	Q
3	Danyil Strelnikov	Russia	2	1:48.20	q
4	Filip Ingebrigtsen	Norway	7	1:48.57	
5	Mokat Petna	Israel	8	1:49.26	PB
6	Soufiane El Kabbouri	Italy	1	1:49.76	
7	Charles Grethen	Luxembourg	3	1:50.01	
8	Pauls Ārents	Latvia	8	1:50.67	
9	Johan Rogestedt	Sweden	6	1:52.81	

Intermediate times:
400m: 53.02 Soufiane El Kabbouri Italy
600m: 1:20.30 Andreas Lange Germany

===== Heat 2 =====
11 July 2013 / 17:38

Rank	Name	Nationality	Lane	Time	Notes
1	Taras Bybyk	Ukraine	4	1:47.63	Q PB
2	Pierre-Ambroise Bosse	France	3	1:47.76	Q
3	Thijmen Kupers	Netherlands	1	1:48.39	q
4	Jacopo Lahbi	Italy	7	1:48.73	
5	Dennis Krüger	Germany	8	1:48.87	
6	Thomas Roth	Norway	5	1:48.88	
7	Roland Christen	Switzerland	6	1:51.14	
8	Rickard Gunnarsson	Sweden	2	1:51.22	
9	Christos Demetriou	Cyprus	8	1:51.85	

Intermediate times:
400m: 52.40 Pierre-Ambroise Bosse France
600m: 1:20.13 Pierre-Ambroise Bosse France

===== Heat 3 =====
11 July 2013 / 17:46

Rank	Name	Nationality	Lane	Time	Notes
1	Alejandro Estévez	Spain	7	1:49.20	Q
2	Amel Tuka	Bosnia and Herzegovina	3	1:49.41	Q
3	Mark English	Ireland	6	1:49.65	
4	Žan Rudolf	Slovenia	5	1:50.05	
5	Miroslav Burian	Czech Republic	1	1:50.52	
6	Mattia Moretti	Italy	8	1:51.90	
7	Renārs Stepiņš	Latvia	2	1:52.95	
8	Kevin Stadler	Germany	4	1:53.29	
9	Artur Kuciapski	Poland	8	1:53.50	

Intermediate times:
400m: 54.75 Alejandro Estévez Spain
600m: 1:22.22 Alejandro Estévez Spain

== Participation ==
According to an unofficial count, 27 athletes from 20 countries participated in the event.

- Belgium (1)
- Bosnia and Herzegovina (1)
- Cyprus (1)
- Czech Republic (1)
- France (1)
- Germany (3)
- Ireland (1)
- Israel (1)
- Italy (3)
- Latvia (2)
- Luxembourg (1)
- Netherlands (1)
- Norway (2)
- Poland (1)
- Russia (1)
- Slovenia (1)
- Spain (1)
- Sweden (2)
- Switzerland (1)
- Ukraine (1)
