= Artur Kuciapski =

Polish middle-distance runner

Personal information
- Nationality: Kazakhstani
- Born: 26 December 1993 (age 32) Poland

Sport
- Sport: Athletics
- Event: 800 m
- Club: AZS-AWF Warszawa
Medal record
Men's athletics
Representing Poland
European Championships
Silver medal – second place	2014 Zürich	800 m
European U23 Championships
Gold medal – first place	2015 Tallinn	800 m

Artur Kuciapski (born 26 December 1993) is a Polish middle-distance runner, who specializes in the 800 metres.

== Biography ==
On 15 August 2014, he won the silver medal at the 2014 European Championship with a new personal best of 1:44.89.

In 2017, he won the bronze medal in the men's 4 × 800 metres relay at the 2017 IAAF World Relays held in Nassau, Bahamas.

== Competition record ==
Year	Competition	Venue	Position	Event	Notes
2012	World Junior Championships	Barcelona, Spain	49th (h)	800 m	1:53.95
2013	European U23 Championships	Tampere, Finland	27th (h)	800 m	1:53.50
2014	European Championships	Zürich, Switzerland	2nd	800 m	1:44.89
2015	European U23 Championships	Tallinn, Estonia	1st	800 m	1:48.11
2015	World Championships	Beijing, China	39th (h)	800 m	1:49.22
2017	IAAF World Relays	Nassau, Bahamas	3rd	4 × 800 m relay	7:18.74
2017	Universiade	Taipei, Taiwan	5th	800 m	1:47.69

== Personal bests ==
Outdoor

- 400 metres – 47.09 (Biała Podlaska 2014)
- 800 metres – 1:44.89 (Zürich 2014)
- 1500 metres – 4:18.47 (Łódź 2009)

Indoor

- 400 metres – 48.87 (Spała 2014)
- 600 metres – 1:16.77 (Athlone 2017)
- 800 metres – 1:48.14 (Toruń 2017)
- 1000 metres – 2:23.96 (Spała 2014)
