= Luguelín Santos =

Dominican sprinter

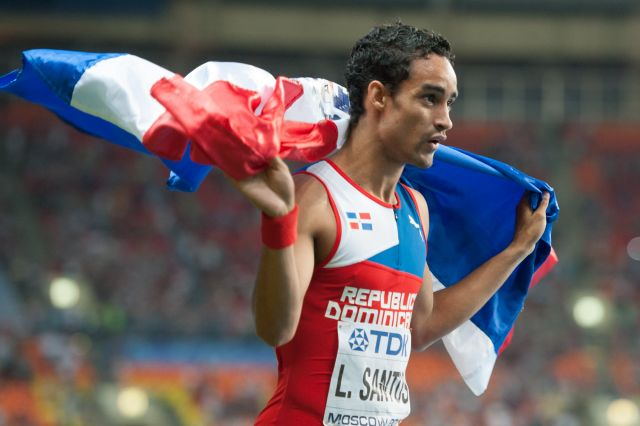
- Santos at the 2013 World Championships

Personal information
- Full name: Luguelín Miguel Santos Aquino
- Born: 12 November 1992 (age 33) Bayaguana, Monte Plata, Dominican Republic
- Height: 1.73 m (5 ft 8 in)
- Weight: 61 kg (134 lb)

Sport
- Sport: Track and field
- Events: 400 metres 4 × 400m Relay

Achievements and titles
- Personal bests: Outdoor; 100m: 11.14 (Ponce 2014); 150m: 15.92 (Riffa 2014); 200m: 20.55 (Morelia 2013); 300m: 32.56 (Uppsala 2012); 400 m: 44.11 (Beijing 2015 NR); 600m: 1:15:58 (San Juan 2016 NR); 800m: 1:48.67 (Mayagüez 2017); Indoor; 200m: 21.59 (New York 2017); 300m: 33.16 (Ostrava 2018); 400m: 45.80 (Madrid 2017 NR); 500m: 1:01.76 (New York 2017); 600m: 1:16:01 (Montreal 2015); 800m: 1:52.98 (New York 2017)
Medal record
Representing the Dominican Republic
Olympic Games
| Silver medal – second place | 2012 London | 400 m |
| Silver medal – second place | 2020 Tokyo | 4×400 m mixed |
World Championships
| Bronze medal – third place | 2013 Moscow | 400 m |
Pan American Games
| Gold medal – first place | 2015 Toronto | 400 m |
| Silver medal – second place | 2011 Guadalajara | 400 m |
| Silver medal – second place | 2011 Guadalajara | 4×400 m relay |
World Junior Championships
| Disqualified | 2012 Barcelona | 400 m |
Summer Youth Olympics
| Gold medal – first place | 2010 Singapore | 400 m |
| Gold medal – first place | 2010 Singapore | Medley relay |
Universiade
| Gold medal – first place | 2015 Gwangju | 4x400 m relay |
| Gold medal – first place | 2015 Gwangju | 400 m |
| Gold medal – first place | 2017 Taipei | 400 m |
| Gold medal – first place | 2017 Taipei | 4x400 m relay |
CAC Championships
| Bronze medal – third place | 2013 Morelia | 4x400 m relay |
Representing the Americas
Continental Cup
| Gold medal – first place | 2018 Ostrava | 4×400 m mixed |
- Updated on 24 December 2014

Luguelín Miguel Santos Aquino (born 12 November 1992) is a Dominican sprinter, who specialises in the 400 m. He was the silver medallist in the event at the 2012 London Olympics at the age of nineteen. His personal best is 44.11 seconds.

Santos emerged with two gold medals at the 2010 Summer Youth Olympics and made his senior breakthrough at the 2011 Pan American Games, taking individual and relay silver medals with Dominican national record times. He belongs to the Dominican olympic program CRESO.

== Career ==
=== Early life ===
Born in Bayaguana to Juan Santos Santos (a lift operator) and Irma Aquino Mejia (a housewife), Luguelín Santos's upbringing was marked by poverty. His older cousin, Celia Aquino, suggested that he and his brother, Juander, start competing in athletics as she did. He began running in 2002, although he ran barefoot, as he had no shoes and he was often hungry. There was no running track near where he lived in Monte Plata Province, so he trained at the local baseball stadium instead. He initially tried long distances, then moved down to middle distances, before finally settling on the 400 m at the age of fourteen.

In 2008, the fourteen-year-old Santos ran the 400 m in 53 seconds and he decided to take the sport seriously after running at the national schools championships. His performances attracted the attention of José Ludwig Rubio, a Dominican coach and former president of the national association. The following year he ran a personal best of 47.58 seconds and made his international debut at the 2009 Pan American Junior Athletics Championships. He was eliminated in the first round of the 400 m and was impressed at the speed of fellow Caribbean athlete Rondell Bartholomew. He broke his first national junior record at the competition as part of the Dominican 4×400 metres relay team, running a time of 3:13.18 minutes. A visa problem caused him to miss out on the 2009 World Youth Championships in Athletics.

The 2010 season saw him win further accolades as he ran a Dominican youth and junior record time of 46.19 seconds in June and a week later won the silver medal at the 2010 Central American and Caribbean Junior Championships. Held at Santo Domingo's Estadio Olímpico Félix Sánchez, Santos also won a relay bronze and knocked two and half seconds off the national junior record. Stepping up to the global stage, he came sixth in the final at the 2010 World Junior Championships in Athletics then achieved his first major victories at the Youth Olympic Games in Singapore, taking the 400 m and sprint medley relay titles.

=== First senior medals ===
At the start of 2011 he moved to San Germán, Puerto Rico to be close to his coach and study at the Interamerican University of Puerto Rico. A hamstring injury hampered his training in the first half of the year and also led to him pulling up in the final at the 2011 Central American and Caribbean Championships. He missed qualification for the 2011 World Championships in Athletics, but his form returned in August as he ran under 46 seconds in Bogotá. He excelled at the 2011 Pan American Games, where a series of good runs culminated in two silver medals and two Dominican records. He ran 44.71 seconds (beating Felix Sánchez's time) to take the 400 m silver medal behind Nery Brenes, then helped the Dominican 4 × 400 m relay quartet to a second national record of 3:00.44 minutes to finish as runners-up behind Cuba.

Building upon his success in regional competition, he ran for the first time indoors at the 2012 IAAF World Indoor Championships, reaching the semi-finals and setting an indoor best of 46.83 seconds. He made a strong start on major track circuit, finishing second at the Doha Diamond League meeting with a time of 44.88 seconds. He was second at the Golden Spike Ostrava, then had a winning run of 44.45 seconds at the FBK Games, which ranked him third on the all-time junior lists. He also ran a national junior record of 20.73 seconds for the 200 metres that month. His first Diamond League win followed at the Adidas Grand Prix, where he beat former World and Olympic champion Jeremy Wariner. A day later he ran at the 2012 Ibero-American Championships in Athletics in Barquisimeto with the Dominican relay team, taking a bronze medal and securing their place at the Olympics.

=== Olympic silver medal ===
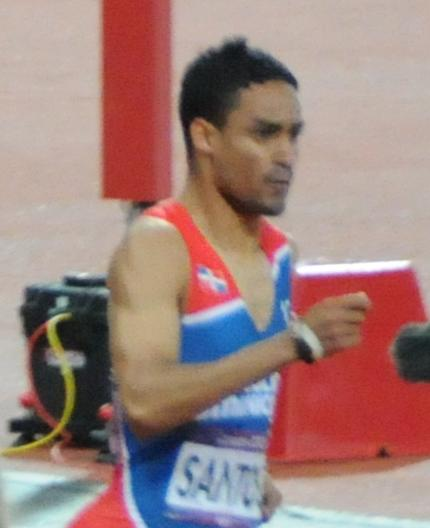
Santos in the 400 m Olympic final.

After winning his country's first ever medal at the World Junior Championships in Barcelona (of which he was later stripped due to age falsification), Santos said: "so far only Americans have finished in under 44 seconds, I want to be the first from somewhere else". He was beaten to that distinction by Grenada's Kirani James in the 400 m final at the 2012 Summer Olympics. Santos was next to finish after James, however, as he ran within 0.01 of his personal best time to claim an unexpected Olympic silver medal. His was the third ever medal for the Dominican Republic, coming just 45 minutes after Felix Sánchez won his second Olympic gold. A team of Gustavo Cuesta, Felix Sánchez, Joel Mejia and Santos appeared to have qualified for the 4 × 400 m relay final, but the second baton change was outside of the changeover zone and the team was disqualified.

=== 2013–2016 ===
In the 400 m final of the 2013 World Championships, Santos went from a non-medal position to winning the bronze medal, after closing down several athletes on the home straight, including the defending champion, Kirani James.

Santos won the 400 m gold medal in the 2015 Pan American Games. Despite being among the pre-race favourites for the 2015 World Championships 400 metres, Santos finished in fourth place in the finals. However, in doing so, he gained the distinction of holding the fastest ever non-medal time in that event. He also broke his own National Record.

At the 2016 Olympics, Santos finished second in his 400 m preliminary heat, behind Wayde Van Niekerk (who was to go onto break the World Record in the final). In the semi-final, Santos ran a Season's Best of 44.71, as he finished 4th and didn't reach the final.

=== Charges of age falsification ===
In 2023, he was suspended by World Athletics on charges of age falsification that took place early in his career. He has admitted that he competed in junior events with a passport stating he was born in 1993 despite having been born in 1992. Some of his junior victories were in events where a date of birth in 1993 was required and mean he could be disqualified if found guilty On 1 December 2023 the Athletics Integrity Unit confirmed that he had been found liable, stripped him of his world Junior title and banned him from the sport for three years. Despite being found to be ineligible for the 2010 Summer Youth Olympics he is still credited as a gold medalist for these games.

== International competitions ==
| Year | Competition | Venue | Position | Event | Notes |
Representing Dominican Republic
| 2009 | Pan American Junior Championships | Port of Spain, Trinidad and Tobago | 12th (h) | 400 m | 47.88 |
| 2009 | Pan American Junior Championships | Port of Spain, Trinidad and Tobago | 6th | 4 × 400 m | 3:13.18 |
| 2010 | Central American and Caribbean; Junior Championships (U20) | Santo Domingo, Dominican Republic | 2nd | 400 m | 46.94 |
| 2010 | Central American and Caribbean; Junior Championships (U20) | Santo Domingo, Dominican Republic | 3rd | 4 × 400 m | 3:10.55 |
| 2010 | World Junior Championships | Moncton, Canada | 6th | 400 m | 46.90 |
| 2010 | Youth Olympic Games | Singapore | 1st | 400 m | 47.11 |
| 2011 | Central American and Caribbean Championships | Mayagüez Puerto Rico | 8th (h) | 400 m | 47.07^{1} |
| 2011 | Pan American Games | Guadalajara, Mexico | 2nd | 400 m | 44.71 |
| 2011 | Pan American Games | Guadalajara, Mexico | 2nd | 4 × 400 m | 3:00.44 |
| 2012 | World Indoor Championships | Istanbul, Turkey | 9th (sf) | 400 m | 46.83 |
| 2012 | Ibero-American Championships | Barquisimeto, Venezuela | 3rd | 4 × 400 m | 3:02.02 |
| 2012 | World Junior Championships | Barcelona, Spain | DQ | 400 m | 44.85 |
| 2012 | Olympic Games | London, United Kingdom | 2nd | 400 m | 44.46 |
| 2012 | Olympic Games | London, United Kingdom | – | 4 × 100 m | DQ |
| 2013 | Central American and Caribbean Championships | Morelia, Mexico | 4th | 200 m | 20.55 |
| 2013 | Central American and Caribbean Championships | Morelia, Mexico | 3rd | 4 × 400 m | 3:02.82 |
| 2013 | World Championships | Moscow, Russia | 38th (h) | 200 m | 21.13 |
| 2013 | World Championships | Moscow, Russia | 3rd | 400 m | 44.52 |
| 2013 | World Championships | Moscow, Russia | 14th (h) | 4 × 400 m | 3:03.61 |
| 2014 | World Indoor Championships | Sopot, Poland | 7th (sf) | 400 m | 46.37 |
| 2014 | IAAF World Relays | Nassau, Bahamas | 11th (B) | 4 × 400 m | 3:03.41 |
| 2014 | Ibero-American Championships | São Paulo, Brazil | 5th | 200 m | 20.97 |
| 2014 | Ibero-American Championships | São Paulo, Brazil | 1st | 4 × 400 m | 3:02.73 |
| 2014 | Pan American Sports Festival | Mexico City, Mexico | 1st | 400 m | 45.06 A |
| 2014 | Central American and Caribbean Games | Xalapa, Mexico | 4th | 4 × 400 m | 3:02.86 A |
| 2015 | IAAF World Relays | Nassau, Bahamas | 23rd (h) | 4 × 400 m | 3:12.55 |
| 2015 | Universiade | Gwangju, South Korea | 1st | 400 m | 44.91 |
| 2015 | Universiade | Gwangju, South Korea | 1st | 4 × 400 m | 3:05.05 |
| 2015 | NACAC Championships | San José, Costa Rica | 4th | 4 × 400 m | 3:01.73 |
| 2015 | World Championships | Beijing, China | 4th | 400 m | 44.11 NR |
| 2015 | World Championships | Beijing, China | 10th (h) | 4 × 400 m | 3:00.15 NR |
| 2016 | Ibero-American Championships | Rio de Janeiro, Brazil | 2nd | 400 m | 45.58 |
| 2016 | Olympic Games | Rio de Janeiro, Brazil | 10th (sf) | 400 m | 44.71 |
| 2016 | Olympic Games | Rio de Janeiro, Brazil | 10th (h) | 4 × 400 m | 3:01.76 |
| 2017 | World Championships | London, United Kingdom | 24th (h) | 400 m | 45.73 |
| 2017 | Universiade | Taipei, Taiwan | 1st | 400 m | 45.24 |
| 2017 | Universiade | Taipei, Taiwan | 1st | 4 × 400 m | 3:04.34 |
| 2017 | Bolivarian Games | Santa Marta, Colombia | 3rd | 200 m | 20.95 |
| 2017 | Bolivarian Games | Santa Marta, Colombia | 1st | 400 m | 45.44 |
| 2018 | World Indoor Championships | Birmingham, United Kingdom | 3rd (sf) | 400 m | 46.31^{2} |
| 2018 | Central American and Caribbean Games | Barranquilla, Colombia | 1st | 400 m | 44.59 |
| 2018 | Central American and Caribbean Games | Barranquilla, Colombia | 2nd | 4 × 400 m | 3:03.92 |
| 2019 | Pan American Games | Lima, Peru | 7th | 400 m | 45.73 |
| 2019 | Pan American Games | Lima, Peru | 4th | 4 × 400 m | 3:05.64 |
| 2022 | Ibero-American Championships | La Nucía, Spain | 2nd | 400 m | 45.50 |
| 2022 | Ibero-American Championships | La Nucía, Spain | 1st | 4 × 400 m relay | 3:00.98 |
| 2026 | Central American and Caribbean Games | Santo Domingo, Dominican Republic | 2nd | 4 × 400 m relay | 3:00.94 |

^{1}Did not finish in the final
^{2}Disqualified in the final

== Personal bests ==
- 200 metres: 20.55 (2013)
- 300 metres: 32.56 (2012)
- 400 metres: 44.11 (2015) NR
- 400 metres (indoor): 45.80 (2017) NR

Olympic Games
| Preceded by Gabriel Mercedes | Flagbearer for Dominican Republic; Rio de Janeiro 2016 | Succeeded by Rodrigo Marte & Prisilla Rivera |
