= 2017 Italian Athletics Indoor Championships =

- Dates: 18–19 February
- Host city: Ancona
- Venue: Palaindoor di Ancona
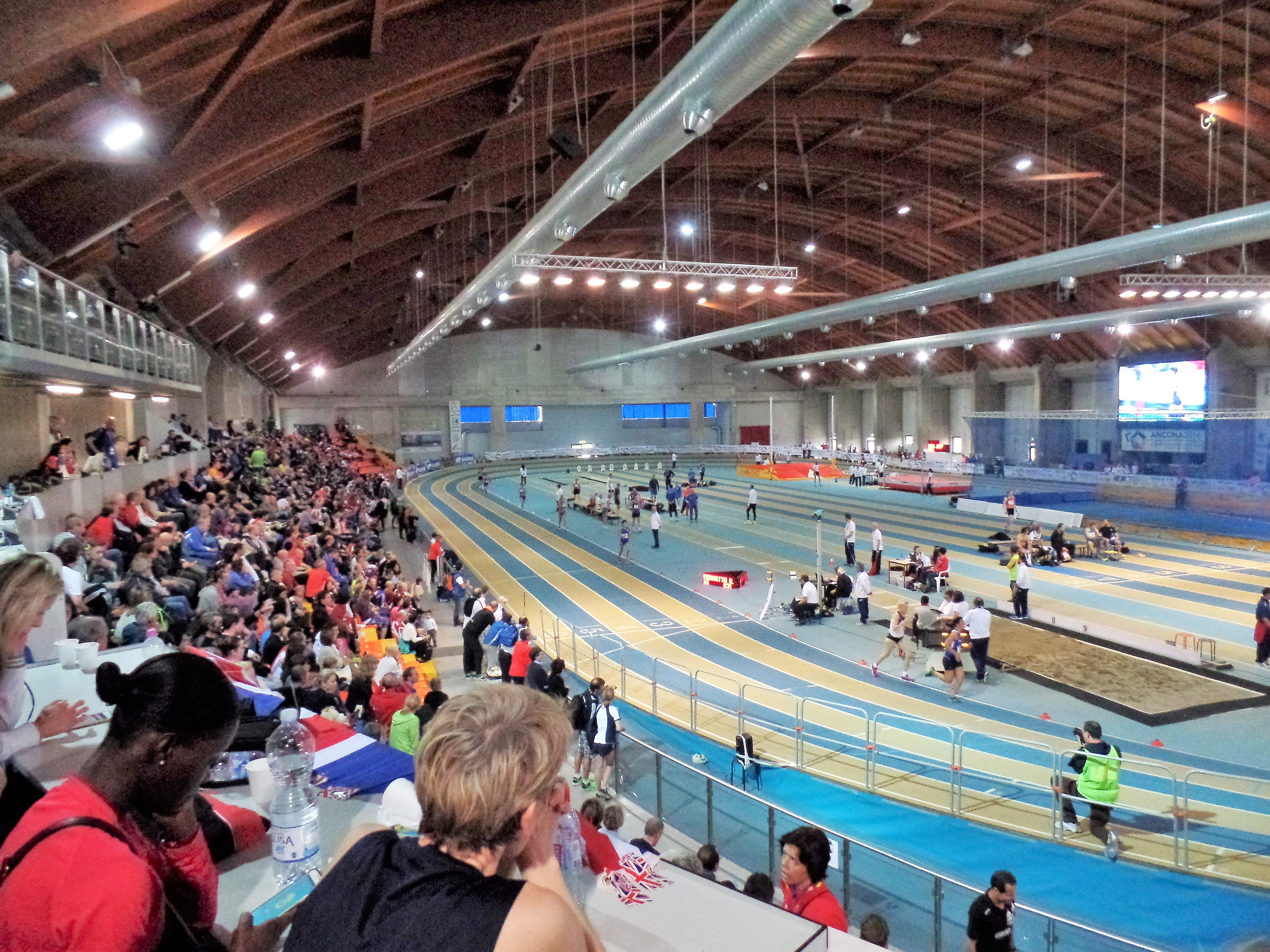
- Level: Senior
- Events: 24

2017 Italian Athletics Indoor Championships was the 48th edition of the Italian Athletics Indoor Championships and were held in Ancona.

== Champions ==
Event	Men	Performance	Women	Performance
60 m	Massimiliano Ferraro	6.64	Anna Bongiorni	7.30
400 m	Marco Lorenzi	47.17	Ayomide Folorunso	53.38
800 m	Simone Barontini	1:49.40	Irene Baldessari	2:04.30
1500 m	Yassin Bouih	3:48.22	Giulia Aprile	4:31.67
3000 m	Yassin Bouih	8:08.52	Giulia Viola	9:04.18
60 m hs	Hassane Fofana	7.73	Elisa Di Lazzaro	8.25
5000/3000 m race walk	Francesco Fortunato	18:59.06	Antonella Palmisano	12:08.83
Long jump	Marcell Jacobs	8.06 m	Laura Strati	6.59 m
Triple jump	Daniele Cavazzani	16.49 m	Dariya Derkach	14.05 m
High jump	Silvano Chesani	2.25 m	Elena Vallortigara	1.87 m
Pole vault	Giorgio Piantella	5.40 m	Maria Roberta Gherca	4.15 m
Shot put	Sebastiano Bianchetti	19.19 m	Chiara Rosa	16.17 m

== See also ==
- 2017 Italian Athletics Championships
