= Johannes Trefz =

German sprinter (born 1992)

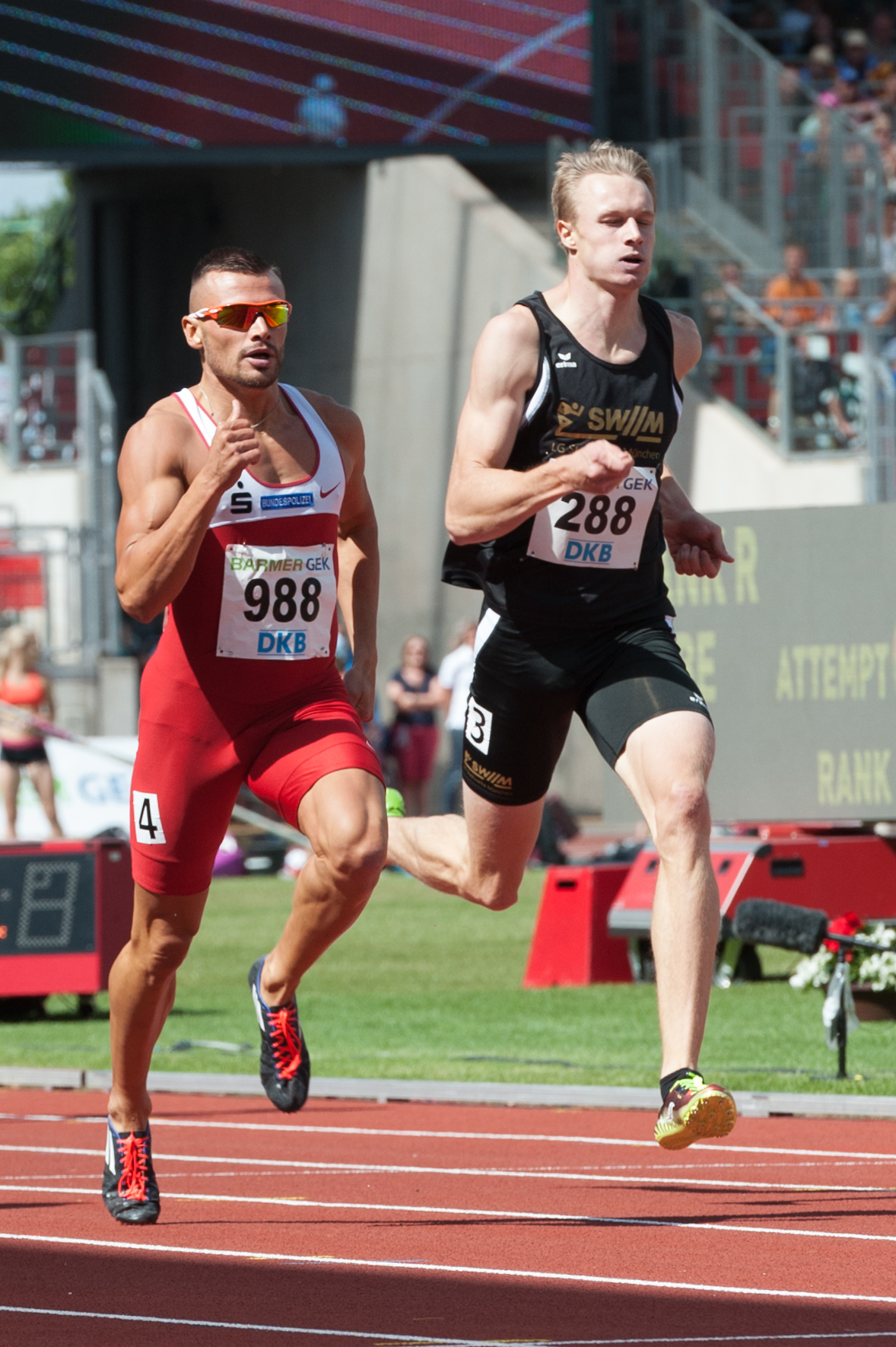
- Johannes Trefz (right) with Eric Krüger (left)I in 2015

Personal information
- Born: 7 June 1992 (age 33) Starnberg, Bavaria, Germany
- Height: 2.00 m (6 ft 7 in)
- Weight: 92 kg (203 lb)

Sport
- Sport: Athletics
- Event: 400 metres
- Club: LG Stadtwerke München
- Coached by: Korbinian Mayr; Peter Rabenseifner

Johannes Trefz (born 7 June 1992 in Starnberg) is a German sprinter specialising in the 400 metres. He won a bronze medal in the 4 × 400 metres relay at the 2011 European Junior Championships. He plays for LG Stadtwerke München.

His personal best in the event is 45.70 seconds set in Nuremberg in 2018.

In 2019, he won the bronze medal in the team event at the 2019 European Games held in Minsk, Belarus.

== International competitions ==
Year	Competition	Venue	Position	Event	Notes
Representing Germany
2011	European Junior Championships	Tallinn, Estonia	13th (sf)	400 m	47.85
2011	European Junior Championships	Tallinn, Estonia	3rd	4 × 400 m relay	3:08.56
2013	European U23 Championships	Tampere, Finland	9th (h)	400 m	46.97
2013	European U23 Championships	Tampere, Finland	4th	4 × 400 m relay	3:05.24
2015	World Relays	Nassau, Bahamas	3rd (B)	4 × 400 m relay	3:04.90
2016	European Championships	Amsterdam, Netherlands	15th (sf)	400 m	46.07
2016	European Championships	Amsterdam, Netherlands	8th	4 × 400 m relay	3:05.67
2017	World Relays	Nassau, Bahamas	6th (B)	4 × 400 m relay	3:09.53
2018	World Cup	London, United Kingdom	3rd	4 × 400 m relay	3:03.16
2018	European Championships	Berlin, Germany	19th (h)	400 m	46.53
2018	European Championships	Berlin, Germany	8th	4 × 400 m relay	3:04.69
2019	World Relays	Yokohama, Japan	6th (B)	4 × 400 m relay	3:05.35
