= Steven Solomon =

Australian sprinter (born 1993)

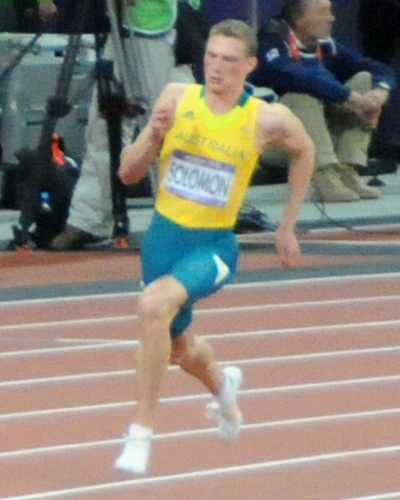

Personal information
- Nationality: Australia
- Born: 16 May 1993 (age 33) Vaucluse, New South Wales
- Height: 1.85 m (6 ft 1 in)
- Weight: 73 kg (161 lb)

Sport
- Sport: Running
- Event: 400 metres
- College team: Duke Blue Devils Stanford Cardinal
- Club: Randwick Botany Harriers
- Coached by: Iryna Dvoskina (in Australia); PattiSue Plumer (at Stanford)

Achievements and titles
- Olympic finals: 2012 Summer Olympics in London, 400m, placed eighth.
- World finals: 2012 IAAF World Junior Championships, 400m, bronze medal.
- National finals: Five-time defending Australian 400 metres champion.
- Personal best: 400 m: 44.94 (Tokyo 2021)
Medal record
Men's athletics
Representing Australia
Maccabiah Games
Silver medal – second place	2013 Israel	400 m
World Junior Championships
Silver medal – second place	2012 Barcelona	400 m
Oceania Youth Championships
Gold medal – first place	2010 Sydney	4×400 m relay

Steven Solomon (born 16 May 1993) is an Australian Olympic sprinter. He is a six-time defending Australian 400 metres champion.

In 2011, he broke the 30-year-old national junior record in the 400m. At the 2012 Summer Olympics in London at the age of 19, Solomon competed in the finals of the men's 400m race, placing eighth with a time of 45.14 after running a time of 44.97 in the semifinals. He was the first Australian man in 24 years to reach the 400m Olympic final, and became the first Australian since Cathy Freeman to make the final of the 400m at the Olympic Games for Australia. At the 2012 IAAF World Junior Championships he won a bronze medal.

At the 2013 Maccabiah Games, Solomon won a silver medal in the 400m race. At Stanford in 2013, he established a new freshman record in the 400m. In 2014, he set a new Stanford record in the outdoor 400m with a time of 45.36, and ran a 500m in 1:01.44 (the third-fastest time in the world to that point).

== Early life ==
Solomon was born in the Sydney suburb of Vaucluse, New South Wales, Australia, and is Jewish. His local rabbi is Levi Wolff, a Chabadnik who runs Sydney Australia's largest Modern Orthodox Judaism congregation, Central Synagogue. His father, Michael, is a South African-born orthopedic surgeon, and his mother is Lucille Solomon. He has a younger sister, Bianca.

Solomon was raised in East Lindfield and attended Lindfield East Public School and Cranbrook School, Sydney. Solomon planned to follow his father into medicine after accepting an athletic scholarship in track at Stanford University. At Stanford, he studied Human Biology, and graduated in 2017. He is attending Duke University in 2017–18 to study for a Masters in Management Studies (MMS) at the Fuqua School of Business.

== Career ==
Solomon first began formal track training in 2009, and that year he won the Under-17 All-Schools Championship in the 400m. Solomon competed for Australia in the Maccabiah Games, the "Jewish Olympics", as captain of the junior soccer team at the 2009 Maccabiah Games. He was named the 2009 Maccabi New South Wales Junior Sportsman of the Year.

After breaking the 30-year-old national junior record in the 400m in 2011, Solomon was part of the Australian squad in the 4 × 400 metres relay at the 2011 World Championships in Athletics. He won the 2011 Australia National Championship in the 400m at 17 years of age. In September 2011, he had a hamstring tear. He was named the Maccabi New South Wales Sportsman of the Year in 2011.

At the 2012 Summer Olympics in London at the age of 19, he competed in the finals of the Men's 400 m race, placing eighth with a time of 45.14, after running a time of 44.97 in the semifinals. Two and a half years prior, Solomon had never run a 400m race. He was the first Australian man in 24 years to reach the 400m final at the Olympics. He also ran on Australia's 4x400 relay team that ran 3:03.17 in the first round, and did not advance to the final. He won the 2012 Australia National Championship in the 400m in a time of 45.54, despite his hamstring injury. At the 2012 IAAF World Junior Championships in Barcelona, Spain, he won a bronze medal in the 400m as he set a personal record of 45.52. He was awarded the 2012 Richard Coombes Memorial Award for Most Outstanding Male Athlete.

Solomon competed for Australia again as captain of the junior soccer team at the 2013 Maccabiah Games. At those Games he also competed in track, and won a silver medal in the 400m race, with a time of 46.24. At the 2013 Morton Games in Dublin, Ireland, he came in third with a time of 46.18. At the 2013 World Championships in Athletics in Moscow, Russia, returning from a back injury he led off for the Australia 4 x 400 relay team, running a split of 45.3, as the team finished eighth in the final with a time of 3:02.26. At Stanford in 2013, he established a new freshman record in the 400 with a 46.12 (No. 3 on the school's all-time list), and was named a second-team All-American. He was also named the top junior sprinter for 2013 at the NSW Athletics' awards, and the Maccabi Australia Outstanding Jewish Sportsman of the Year.

In 2014, he set a new Stanford record in the outdoor 400m while winning the Australian national championship, running 45.36, and also finished second at the Pac-12 Championships in a time of 45.79. Running indoors for Stanford, Solomon ran a 45.75 split in the 400 medley relay at the 2014 NCAA Indoor Track and Field Championships (as the Cardinal won the title in 9:37.63), and also won the Mountain Pacific Sports Federation (MPSF) title in the 400 in 46.24, and ran a 500 in 1:01.44 (the third-fastest time in the world to that point). He then had a period of injury as a back problem turned into a chronic hamstring injury. Then, in the 400m semifinal at the 2014 Commonwealth Games, he suffered a torn hamstring that necessitated surgery. Therefore, he only competed for Stanford for two years.

Solomon just missed the qualifying time to represent Australia at the 2016 Olympic Games. The cut-off was 45.40, and he missed it by one-10th of a second.

In April 2017, he won a record-tying fifth Australian National Championship in the 400m, in a time of 46.66 in wet conditions. At the June 2017 TrackTown Summer Series 400m race he ran a time of 45.19, his fastest race since the 2012 Olympic final, thereby qualifying for the 2017 World Championships in Athletics in London.

As a graduate student at Duke University in 2017–18, he is finishing his final year of National Collegiate Athletic Association (NCAA) athletic eligibility with the Duke Blue Devils track & field team. In January and February 2018 he set new personal records in (i) the indoor 800m, with a time of 1:52.09; (ii) the indoor 400m with a time of 45.44 (also a new Australian indoor record, a new all-time Duke University indoor record, and the ACC record); and (iii) in the 600m with a time of 1:17.49 (breaking the Duke record). He finished the season as first team All-ACC, and a second team All-American.

Solomon competed at the 2018 Commonwealth Games, making the final of the 400m.

At age 26, he was an Australian Athletics Team co-captain, stating at the end of 2019 that he was aiming to medal at the upcoming 2020 Tokyo Olympics. After the Olympics were postponed, he maintained competitive training with his coach Penny Gillies, a former 100m Olympic hurdler.

Solomon competed in the 400m at the 2020 Summer Olympics, held in early August 2021 in Tokyo, Japan, setting a PB of 44.94 in his heat in making the semi-finals wherein he finished fourth in his heat in 45.15 (13th overall in the semifinal times). He also competed in the 400m at the 2022 World Athletics Championships held in July at the Hayward Field in Eugene, USA but didn't advance from the heats.

== Achievements ==
Year	Competition	Venue	Position	Event	Notes
Representing Australia
2010	Oceania Youth Championships	Sydney, Australia	1st	4 × 400 m relay	3:20.10
2010	World Junior Championships	Moncton, New Brunswick, Canada	11th (h)	4 × 400 m relay	3:11.19
2012	World Junior Championships	Barcelona, Spain	3rd	400m	45.52
2012	Olympic Games	London, United Kingdom	8th	400m	45.14
2013	World Championships	Moscow, Russia	8th	4 x 400m relay	3:02.26
2017	World Championships	London, United Kingdom	38th (h)	400 m	46.27
2018	Commonwealth Games	Gold Coast, Australia	7th	400 m	45.64
2018	Commonwealth Games	Gold Coast, Australia	–	4 × 400 m relay	DQ
2019	World Relays	Yokohama, Japan	7th	4 × 400 m relay	3:05.59
2019	World Championships	Doha, Qatar	20th (sf)	400 m	45.54
2019	World Championships	Doha, Qatar	14th (h)	4 × 400 m relay	3:05.49
2021	Olympic Games	Tokyo, Japan	13th (sf)	400 m	45.15
2022	World Championships	Eugene, United States	36th (h)	400 m	46.87

== See also ==
- List of select Jewish track and field athletes
