= 2010 World Junior Championships in Athletics – Men's 800 metres =

The men's 800 metres event at the 2010 World Junior Championships in Athletics was held in Moncton, New Brunswick, Canada, at Moncton Stadium on 23, 24 and 25 July.

== Medalists ==
Gold	David Mutinda; Kenya
Silver	Casimir Loxsom; United States
Bronze	Robby Andrews; United States

== Results ==
=== Final ===
25 July

Rank	Name	Nationality	Time	Notes
1st place, gold medalist(s)	David Mutinda	Kenya	1:46.41	
2nd place, silver medalist(s)	Casimir Loxsom	United States	1:46.57	
3rd place, bronze medalist(s)	Robby Andrews	United States	1:47.00	
4	Niall Brooks	United Kingdom	1:47.02	
5	Samir Dahmani	France	1:47.82	
6	Dickson Tuwei	Kenya	1:48.97	
7	Mohamed Al-Garni	Qatar	1:50.16	
8	Pierre-Ambroise Bosse	France	1:53.52	

=== Semifinals ===
24 July

==== Semifinal 1 ====
Rank	Name	Nationality	Time	Notes
1	Dickson Tuwei	Kenya	1:47.51	Q
2	Mohamed Al-Garni	Qatar	1:48.15	Q
3	Samir Dahmani	France	1:48.31	q
4	Halit Kiliç	Turkey	1:48.63	
5	Kuey Diew	Australia	1:49.14	
6	Adam Cotton	United Kingdom	1:50.25	
7	Abdul Aziz Mohamed	Saudi Arabia	1:50.78	
8	Žan Rudolf	Slovenia	1:53.21	

==== Semifinal 2 ====
Rank	Name	Nationality	Time	Notes
1	Robby Andrews	United States	1:48.76	Q
2	Niall Brooks	United Kingdom	1:49.01	Q
3	Miroslav Burian	Czech Republic	1:49.07	
4	Anthony Romaniw	Canada	1:49.26	
5	Pablo Fernández	Spain	1:55.87	
	Esrael Awoke	Ethiopia	DQ	IAAF rule 163.3
	Mark Patterson	Ireland	DQ	IAAF rule 163.3
	Amine El-Manaoui	Morocco	DQ	IAAF rule 163.2

==== Semifinal 3 ====
Rank	Name	Nationality	Time	Notes
1	Casimir Loxsom	United States	1:46.91	Q
2	David Mutinda	Kenya	1:48.04	Q
3	Pierre-Ambroise Bosse	France	1:48.38	q
4	Hamza Driouch	Qatar	1:49.33	
5	Thomas Roth	Norway	1:49.39	
6	Charles Grethen	Luxembourg	1:52.09	
7	Adrian Plummer	Australia	1:52.25	
8	Vasiliy Sadilov	Russia	1:52.68	

=== Heats ===
23 July

==== Heat 1 ====
Rank	Name	Nationality	Time	Notes
1	Pierre-Ambroise Bosse	France	1:50.60	Q
2	Robby Andrews	United States	1:50.80	Q
3	Vasiliy Sadilov	Russia	1:50.92	Q
4	Anthony Romaniw	Canada	1:51.00	q
5	Ahmed Abdel Karim Farag	Egypt	1:51.49	
6	Omar Bejaoui	Spain	1:53.17	
7	Jerry Lauto	Vanuatu	2:02.04	

==== Heat 2 ====
Rank	Name	Nationality	Time	Notes
1	Dickson Tuwei	Kenya	1:49.84	Q
2	Mohamed Al-Garni	Qatar	1:49.95	Q
3	Adam Cotton	United Kingdom	1:50.24	Q
4	Mark Patterson	Ireland	1:50.47	q
5	Farkhod Kuralov	Tajikistan	1:51.39	
6	Anthonio Mascoll	Barbados	1:51.42	
7	Christopher Sandoval	Mexico	1:52.54	
8	Tomás Squella	Chile	1:52.90	

==== Heat 3 ====
Rank	Name	Nationality	Time	Notes
1	David Mutinda	Kenya	1:49.37	Q
2	Hamza Driouch	Qatar	1:49.54	Q
3	Amine El-Manaoui	Morocco	1:49.78	Q
4	Thomas Roth	Norway	1:49.84	q
5	Žan Rudolf	Slovenia	1:50.28	q
6	Jorge Batista	Portugal	1:51.00	
7	Glen Ballam	New Zealand	1:51.96	
	Alex Cherop	Uganda	DQ	IAAF rule 163.3

==== Heat 4 ====
Rank	Name	Nationality	Time	Notes
1	Casimir Loxsom	United States	1:49.47	Q
2	Esrael Awoke	Ethiopia	1:49.66	Q
3	Pablo Fernández	Spain	1:49.71	Q
4	Adrian Plummer	Australia	1:50.00	q
5	Charles Grethen	Luxembourg	1:50.74	q
6	Adrian Cirnaru	Romania	1:52.06	
7	Michel Berning	Germany	1:53.30	
8	Michael James	Saint Lucia	1:57.51	

==== Heat 5 ====
Rank	Name	Nationality	Time	Notes
1	Niall Brooks	United Kingdom	1:51.10	Q
2	Miroslav Burian	Czech Republic	1:51.23	Q
3	Halit Kiliç	Turkey	1:51.25	Q
4	Darren McBrearty	Ireland	1:51.41	
5	Erik Estrada	Puerto Rico	1:52.11	
6	Thomas Eide	Norway	1:52.67	
7	Chouaib Hamdane	Algeria	1:53.15	
8	Abedalaziz Al-Merdek	Jordan	1:53.42	

==== Heat 6 ====
Rank	Name	Nationality	Time	Notes
1	Samir Dahmani	France	1:50.80	Q
2	Abdul Aziz Mohamed	Saudi Arabia	1:51.04	Q
3	Kuey Diew	Australia	1:51.04	Q
4	Taras Bybyk	Ukraine	1:51.15	
5	Andreas Lange	Germany	1:51.18	
6	Rickard Gunnarsson	Sweden	1:52.65	
7	Fabrice Tambwe	DR Congo	1:58.23	
	Abdoul Aziz Kimba	Niger	DQ	IAAF rule 163.3

== Participation ==
According to an unofficial count, 47 athletes from 37 countries participated in the event.

- Algeria (1)
- Australia (2)
- Barbados (1)
- Canada (1)
- Chile (1)
- DR Congo (1)
- Czech Republic (1)
- Egypt (1)
- Ethiopia (1)
- France (2)
- Germany (2)
- Ireland (2)
- Jordan (1)
- Kenya (2)
- Luxembourg (1)
- Mexico (1)
- Morocco (1)
- New Zealand (1)
- Niger (1)
- Norway (2)
- Portugal (1)
- Puerto Rico (1)
- Qatar (2)
- Romania (1)
- Russia (1)
- Saint Lucia (1)
- Saudi Arabia (1)
- Slovenia (1)
- Spain (2)
- Sweden (1)
- Tajikistan (1)
- Turkey (1)
- Uganda (1)
- Ukraine (1)
- United Kingdom (2)
- United States (2)
- Vanuatu (1)
