= Bram Peters =

Dutch athletics coach and sprinter

Bram Peters (pronounced [brɑm ˈpeːtərs]; born 6 February 1992) is a Dutch athletics coach and retired sprinter.

== Career ==
=== Sprinting ===
Peters participated in the 4 × 400 m relay at the 2012 European Athletics Championships, where his team came in seventh. At the 2013 European Athletics U23 Championships, he came in fourth in the 400 m race, and participated in the 4 × 400 m relay, where his team came in seventh. In 2014, he won the 400 m race at the Dutch Indoor Athletics Championships. At the 2014 IAAF World Indoor Championships, he participated in the 400 m race, where he came in fourth in his heat.

Peters retired as an athlete at the age of 24.

=== Coaching ===
At the age of 18, he started as a trainer, beside his sprinting career.

Since age 25, he has worked as an athletics coach at National Sports Centre Papendal. He is from Heesch.

He has been coaching Femke Bol, first as main coach and since 2019 as assistant to Laurent Meuwly.
