= Athletics at the 2010 Summer Youth Olympics – Boys' medley relay =

Athletics – Boys' medley relay at the I Summer Youth Olympic Games
- Venue: Bishan Stadium
- Date: August 23
- Competitors: 20 from 19 nations
- Teams: 5

Medalists
1st place, gold medalist(s)		Team Americas	Mixed-NOCs
2nd place, silver medalist(s)		Team Europe	Mixed-NOCs
3rd place, bronze medalist(s)		Team Oceania	Mixed-NOCs

The boys' medley relay competition at the 2010 Youth Olympic Games was held on 23 August 2010 in Bishan Stadium. The competitors were divided in 5 teams, each representing a different continent.

== Schedule ==
Date	Time	Round
23 August 2010	21:00	Final

== Results ==
=== Final ===
Rank	Team	Time
1st place, gold medalist(s)	Americas; Caio Cézar dos Santos (BRA); Odean Skeen (JAM); Najee Glass (USA); Luguelín Santos (DOM)	1:51.38
2nd place, silver medalist(s)	Europe; David Bolarinwa (GBR); Tomasz Kluczyński (POL); Marco Lorenzi (ITA); Nikita Uglov (RUS)	1:52.11
3rd place, bronze medalist(s)	Oceania; Lepani Naivalu (FIJ); John Rivan (PNG); Nicholas Hough (AUS); Raheen Williams (AUS)	1:52.71
4	Africa; Tinashe Samuel Mutanga (ZIM); Okeudo Jonathan Nmaju (NGR); Alphas Kishoyian (KEN); Ruan Greyling (RSA)	1:53.45
5	Asia; Masaki Nashimoto (JPN); Xie Zhenye (CHN); Abdullah Ahmed Abkar (KSA); Dongbaek Choi (KOR)	1:54.14
