= David Mutinda Mutua =

Kenyan middle-distance runner

Personal information
- Nationality: Kenya
- Born: 20 April 1992 (age 34)

Sport
- Sport: Running
- Event: 800 metres

Achievements and titles
- Personal best: 800 m: 1:43.99 m (Monaco 2011)
Medal record
Representing Kenya
Men's athletics
World Junior Championships
Gold medal – first place	2010 Moncton	800 m
African Junior Championships
Bronze medal – third place	2009 Bambous	800 m

David Mutinda Mutua (born 20 April 1992) is a Kenyan middle distance runner who specialises in the 800 metres.

== Career ==
At the 2010 World Junior Championships in Athletics in Moncton, Canada, Mutua won a gold medal over 800 metres.

== Personal best ==
Distance	Time	venue
800 m	1:43.99	Monte Carlo, Monaco (22 July 2011)
1000 m	2:19.39	Ostrava, Czech Republic (31 May 2011)
