= 2015 European Athletics U23 Championships – Men's 800 metres =

The men's 800 metres event at the 2015 European Athletics U23 Championships was held in Tallinn, Estonia, at Kadriorg Stadium on 10, 11 and 12 July.

== Medalists ==
Gold	Artur Kuciapski; Poland
Silver	Saúl Ordóñez; Spain
Bronze	Žan Rudolf; Slovenia

== Results ==
=== Final ===
12 July

Rank	Name	Nationality	Time	Notes
1st place, gold medalist(s)	Artur Kuciapski	Poland	1:48.11	
2nd place, silver medalist(s)	Saúl Ordóñez	Spain	1:48.23	
3rd place, bronze medalist(s)	Žan Rudolf	Slovenia	1:48.47	
4	Dennis Krüger	Germany	1:48.62	
5	Andreas Roth	Norway	1:48.64	
6	Karl Griffin	Ireland	1:48.79	
7	Daniel Andújar	Spain	1:49.14	
8	Mark English	Ireland	1:50.42	

=== Semifinals ===
11 July

==== Semifinal 1 ====
Rank	Name	Nationality	Time	Notes
1	Artur Kuciapski	Poland	1:48.42	Q
2	Saúl Ordóñez	Spain	1:48.50	Q
3	Žan Rudolf	Slovenia	1:48.57	Q
4	Karl Griffin	Ireland	1:48.65	q
5	Andreas Roth	Norway	1:48.74	q
6	Gabriele Bizzotto	Italy	1:49.81	
7	Aaron Botterman	Belgium	1:49.88	
8	Håkon Mushom	Norway	1:52.40	

==== Semifinal 2 ====
Rank	Name	Nationality	Time	Notes
1	Dennis Krüger	Germany	1:49.89	Q
2	Daniel Andújar	Spain	1:49.91	Q
3	Mark English	Ireland	1:49.94	Q
4	Jamie Webb	United Kingdom	1:50.04	
5	Christos Demetriou	Cyprus	1:50.18	
6	Karol Konieczny	Poland	1:50.31	
7	Álvaro de Arriba	Spain	1:50.37	
	Roald Hagbart Frøskeland	Norway	DNS	

=== Heats ===
10 July

==== Heat 1 ====
Rank	Name	Nationality	Time	Notes
1	Artur Kuciapski	Poland	1:49.29	Q
2	Andreas Roth	Norway	1:49.34	Q
3	Daniel Andújar	Spain	1:49.35	Q
4	Christos Demetriou	Cyprus	1:49.60	q
5	Gabriele Bizzotto	Italy	1:49.93	q
6	Jamie Webb	United Kingdom	1:49.95	q
7	Hasan Basri Güdük	Turkey	1:50.08	

==== Heat 2 ====
Rank	Name	Nationality	Time	Notes
1	Karol Konieczny	Poland	1:49.61	Q
2	Roald Hagbart Frøskeland	Norway	1:50.00	Q
3	Álvaro de Arriba	Spain	1:50.04	Q
4	Yan Sloma	Belarus	1:50.28	
5	Sandy Martins	Portugal	1:50.43	
6	Jacopo Lahbi	Italy	1:50.51	
7	Aurèle Vandeputte	Belgium	1:51.08	
8	Nikolaus Franzmair	Austria	1:51.62	

==== Heat 3 ====
Rank	Name	Nationality	Time	Notes
1	Žan Rudolf	Slovenia	1:49.17	Q
2	Karl Griffin	Ireland	1:49.54	Q
3	Saúl Ordóñez	Spain	1:49.57	Q
4	Håkon Mushom	Norway	1:49.93	q
5	Ville Lampinen	Finland	1:50.04	
6	Nasredine Khatir	France	1:50.06	
7	Balázs Vindics	Hungary	1:50.13	
8	Mārtiņš Karlsons	Latvia	1:54.54	

==== Heat 4 ====
Rank	Name	Nationality	Time	Notes
1	Dennis Krüger	Germany	1:52.88	Q
2	Mark English	Ireland	1:52.91	Q
2	Aaron Botterman	Belgium	1:52.91	Q
4	Theo Blundell	United Kingdom	1:52.97	
5	Enrico Riccobon	Italy	1:53.53	
6	Gergő Kiss	Hungary	1:54.45	
7	Utku Çobanoğlu	Turkey	1:54.45	

== Participation ==
According to an unofficial count, 30 athletes from 18 countries participated in the event.

- Austria (1)
- Belarus (1)
- Belgium (2)
- Cyprus (1)
- Finland (1)
- France (1)
- Germany (1)
- Hungary (2)
- Ireland (2)
- Italy (3)
- Latvia (1)
- Norway (3)
- Poland (2)
- Portugal (1)
- Slovenia (1)
- Spain (3)
- Turkey (2)
- United Kingdom (2)
