= Thijmen Kupers =

Dutch middle-distance runner

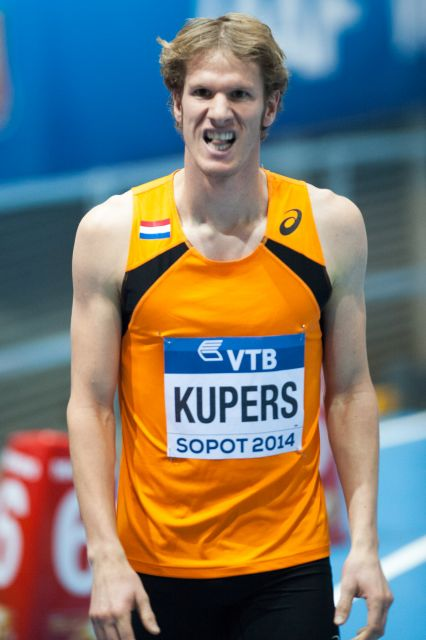
Kupers during the 2014 IAAF World Indoor Championships.

Thijmen Kupers (born 4 October 1991) is a Dutch middle-distance runner who specialises in the 800 metres.

Raised in Lengel, Gelderland, he participated in football and long-distance running as a child. He gradually became more interested in running and signed up with Running Team Achterhoek, a local group. He competed in national junior competitions and began to train regularly around 2008. He placed in the top three in the Dutch junior 800 m race in 2009 and 2010.

Kupers began to make an impact nationally in 2012. He set a personal best of 1:48.71 minutes to win the indoor Dutch title, then set a best of 1:46.46 minutes at the FBK Games, which ranked him second among Dutch athletes behind Robert Lathouwers. He was selected for the 2012 European Athletics Championships and made the semi-finals at the competition – his first senior international event. He defended his national indoor title in 2013 and went on to run in the semi-finals at the 2013 European Athletics Indoor Championships. Outdoors, he came fifth at the European Team Championships first league race, then sixth at the 2013 European Athletics U23 Championships, where he was also seventh in the 4×400 metres relay. He won his first Dutch outdoor title in Amsterdam that season.

Kupers won a third straight indoor title at the start of 2014 and went on to record a best of 1:46.55 minutes at the 2014 IAAF World Indoor Championships, where he came fifth in the final.

== Personal bests ==
- 800 metres outdoor – 1:44:99 min (2017)
- 800 metres indoor – 1:46.21 min (2016)

== Competition record ==
Year	Competition	Venue	Position	Event	Notes
2012	European Championships	Helsinki, Finland	8th (semis)	800 metres	1:50.37
2013	European Indoor Championships	Gothenburg, Sweden	6th (semis)	800 metres	1:50.29
2013	European Team Championships	Dublin, Ireland	5th	800 metres	
2013	European U23 Championships	Tampere, Finland	6th	800m	1:47.15
2013	European U23 Championships	Tampere, Finland	7th	4 × 400 m relay	3:07.47
2014	World Indoor Championships	Sopot, Poland	5th	800 metres	1:47.74
2015	European Indoor Championships	Prague, Czech Republic	3rd	800 metres	1:47.25
2015	World Championships	Beijing, China	15th (sf)	800 m	1:47.74
2016	European Championships	Amsterdam, Netherlands	6th	800 m	1:46.67
2017	European Indoor Championships	Belgrade, Serbia	5th	800 m	1:50.47
2017	World Championships	London, United Kingdom	1st (h)	800 m	1:45.53^{1}
2019	European Indoor Championships	Glasgow, United Kingdom	10th (h)	800 m	1:48.72
2021	European Indoor Championships	Toruń, Poland	26th (h)	800 m	1:50.38

^{1} Din not start in the semifinals

National titles

- 800 metres indoor: 2012, 2013, 2014
- 800 metres outdoor: 2013
