= Ruan Greyling =

South African sprinter (born 1993)

Personal information
- Nationality: South Africa

Sport
- Sport: Athletics
Medal record
Representing South Africa
Youth Olympic Games
Silver medal – second place	2010 Singapore	400 meters

Ruan Greyling (born 28 July 1993) is a South African sprinter. He won silver at the 2010 Youth Olympic Games in the 400 meters. He also competed in the medley relay for Africa alongside Tinashe Samuel Mutanga, Alphas Kishoyian and Okeudo Jonathan Nmaju.

He is the son of middle-distance runner Bennie Greyling.
