= Lorenzo Valentini =

Italian sprinter

Personal information
- Nationality: Italian
- Born: 13 April 1991 (age 35) Rieti, Italy
- Height: 1.84 m (6 ft 1/2 in)
- Weight: 79 kg (174 lb)

Sport
- Country: Italy
- Sport: Athletics
- Event: Sprint
- Club: G.S. Fiamme Gialle
- Coached by: Maria Chiara Milardi

Achievements and titles
- Personal bests: 400 m: 46.49 (2012); 400 m (i): 46.88 (2012)
Medal record
Mediterranean Games
Gold medal – first place	2013 Mersin	4×400 m relay
European U23 Championships
Bronze medal – third place	2013 Tampere	4×400 m relay

Lorenzo Valentini (born 13 April 1991) is an Italian sprinter, specialized in the 400 metres.

== Biography ==
Lorenzo Valentini won a medal at the 2013 Mediterranean Games.

== Achievements ==
Year	Competition	Venue	Position	Event	Notes
2009	European Junior Championships	(Serbia) Novi Sad	SF	200 metres	21.99
2010	World Junior Championships	(Canada) Moncton	26th (h)	200m	21.60 (wind: +0.9 m/s)
2010	World Junior Championships	(Canada) Moncton	14th (h)	4×400m relay	3:12.32
2011	World Indoor Championships	(Turkey) Istanbul	SF	400 metres	48.47
2012	European Championships	(Finland) Helsinki	Heat	400 metres	46.64
2012	European Championships	(Finland) Helsinki	Heat	4×400 m relay	3:08.87
2013	European Indoor Championships	(Sweden) Gothenburg	Heat	400 metres	47.3
2013	Mediterranean Games	(Turkey) Mersin	1st	4×400 m relay	3.04.61
2013	European U23 Championships	(Finland) Tampere	12th (h)	400m	47.03
2013	European U23 Championships	(Finland) Tampere	3rd	4x400m relay	3:05.10

== National titles ==
He has won 2 times the individual national championship.

- 2 wins in 400 metres indoor (2011, 2012)

== See also ==
- Italy at the 2013 Mediterranean Games
