= Sand, Akershus =

- Village
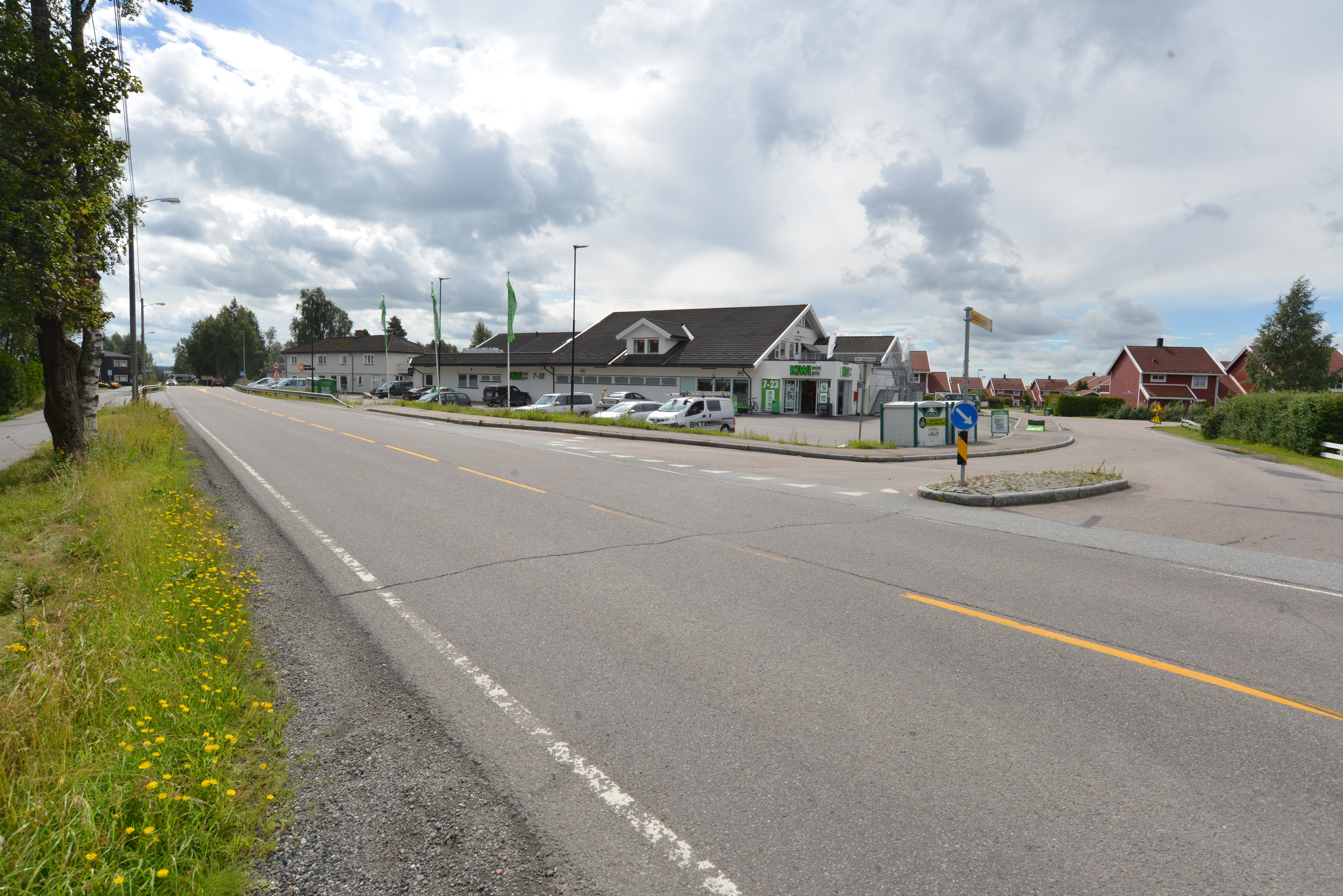
- Gardermovegen in Sand

- Location in Akershus
- Coordinates: 60°09′16″N 11°07′40″E
- Country: Norway
- Region: Østlandet
- County: Akershus
- District: Ullensaker
- Time zone: UTC+01:00 (CET)
  - Summer (DST): UTC+02:00 (CEST)

Sand is a village in Ullensaker municipality in Akershus, Norway. The village lies halfway between Gardermoen and Jessheim. The village was previously its own urban area, but now is part of the urban area of Jessheim. Raknehaugen, Ljøgodttjernet, Olaløkka and Kjosbakken are places in Sand.

Sand is the location of Ullensaker golfklubb (UGK). Sand also has its own football team, named Sand IL. The first team played for a while in the Norwegian 8th division and play their home games at the Olaløkka stadion. The sports club have activities for all ages, including skiing, basketball, table tennis, BMX, skateboarding, aerobics and dance.

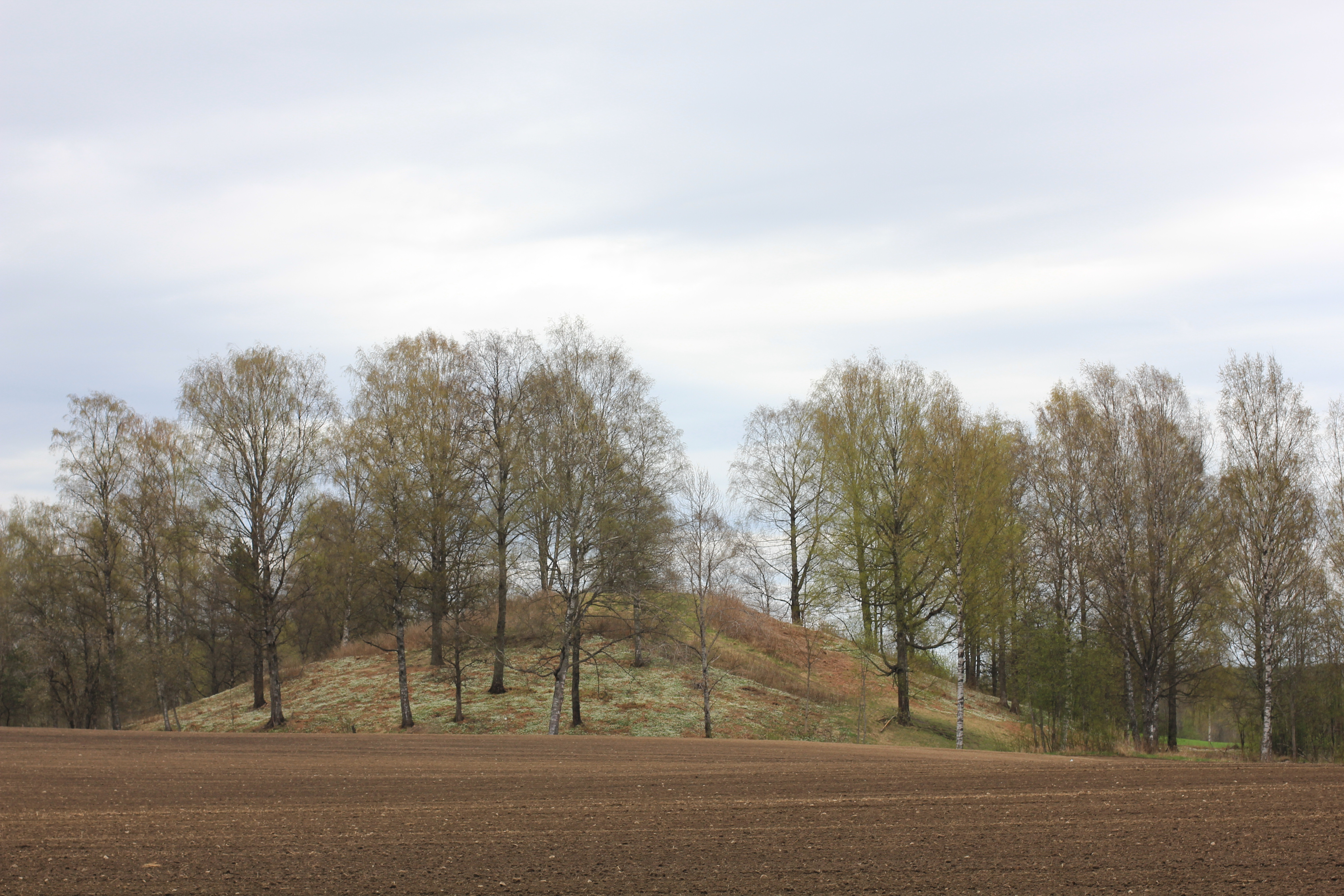
Raknehaugen burial mound
