= Michele Tricca =

Italian sprinter

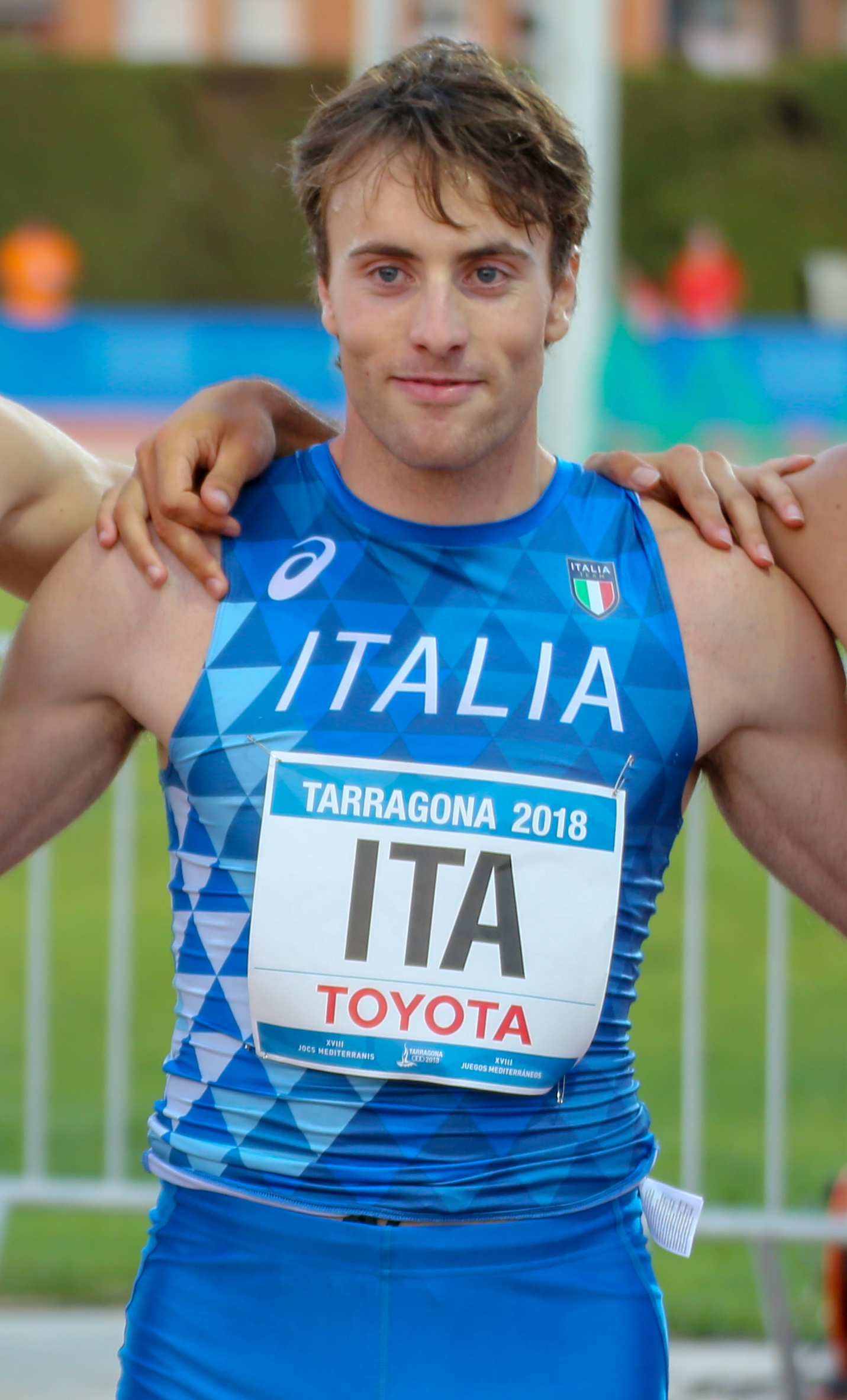
- Michele Tricca in 2018

Personal information
- Nationality: Italian
- Born: 28 April 1993 (age 33) Susa, Italy
- Height: 1.79 m (5 ft 10 1/2 in)
- Weight: 70 kg (154 lb)

Sport
- Country: Italy
- Sport: Athletics
- Event: Sprint
- Club: G.S. Fiamme Gialle
- Coached by: Augusto Fontan

Achievements and titles
- Personal best: 400 m: 46.09 (2011)
Medal record
Mediterranean Games
Gold medal – first place	2013 Mersin	4×400 m relay
Gold medal – first place	2018 Tarragona	4×400 m relay
European U23 Championships
Bronze medal – third place	2013 Tampere	4x400 m relay
European Junior Championships
Gold medal – first place	2011 Tallinn	4x400 m relay
Bronze medal – third place	2011 Tallinn	400 metres

Michele Tricca (born 26 April 1993) is an Italian sprinter, specialized in the 400 metres.

== Biography ==
Michele Tricca won a medal at the 2013 Mediterranean Games. At youth level he won a medal at the Gymnasiade (Doha 2009) and two medals at the 2011 European Athletics Junior Championships held in Tallinn.

== Achievements ==
Year	Competition	Venue	Position	Event	Time	Notes
2010	World Junior Championships	(Canada) Moncton	14th (h)	4×400 m relay	3:12.32	
2013	Mediterranean Games	(Turkey) Mersin	1st	4×400 m relay	3.04.61	SB
2013	European U23 Championships	(Finland) Tampere	14th (h)	400 m	47.16	
2013	European U23 Championships	(Finland) Tampere	3rd	4x400 m relay	3:05.10	
2018	Mediterranean Games	(Spain) Tarragona	5th	400 m	46.35	SB
2018	Mediterranean Games	(Spain) Tarragona	1st	4x400 m relay	3:03.54	
2019	European Indoor Championships	(United Kingdom) Glasgow	6th	4×400 m relay	3:09.48	

== National titles ==
- Italian Athletics Indoor Championships
  - 400 metres: 2019, 2020

== See also ==
- Italian national track relay team
