= Marco Lorenzi =

Italian sprinter

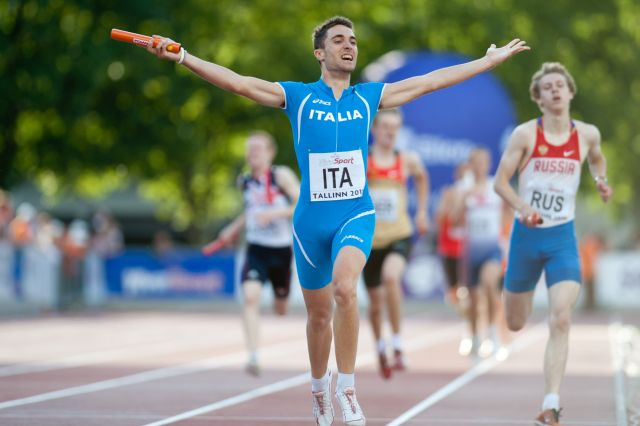
- Lorenzi at the 2011 European Athletics U23 Championships

Personal information
- Nationality: Italian
- Born: June 20, 1993 (age 33) Trento, Italy
- Height: 1.84 m (6 ft 1/2 in)
- Weight: 71 kg (157 lb)

Sport
- Country: Italy
- Sport: Athletics
- Event: 400 metres
- Club: G.S. Fiamme Gialle
- Coached by: Walter Groff

Achievements and titles
- Personal bests: 200 m: 21.42 (2012); 400 m: 46.39 outdoor (2011); 400 m: 47.17 indoor (2017)
Medal record
European U20 Championships
Gold medal – first place	2011 Tallinn	4x400 m relay
Bronze medal – third place	2013 Tampere	4x400 m relay
Summer Youth Olympics
Silver medal – second place	2010 Singapore	Medley relay

Marco Lorenzi (20 June 1993) is an Italian sprinter (400 m).

== Biography ==
Born in Trento, he has junior national record of the 400 metres with the time of 46.39. After a few seasons, he returned to a decent international level in 2017 in the indoor season, winning his first senior national title and establishing his Personal Best, which also appeared in the top 60 positions of the 400-meter annual Top List.

== Personal bests ==
- 400 metres outdoor: 46.39 ( (Italy) Bressanone, 18 June 2011)
- 400 metres indoor: 47.17 ( (Italy) Ancona, 19 February 2017)

== Achievements ==
Year	Competition	Venue	Position	Event	Performance	Notes
2010	European Youth Olympic Trials	(Russia) Moscow	2nd	400 m	47.05	
2010	Summer Youth Olympics	Singapore	2nd	Medley relay	1:52.11	
2011	European U20 Championships	(Estonia) Tallinn	4th	400 m	46.42	
2011	European U20 Championships	(Estonia) Tallinn	1st	4x400 m relay	3.06.46	(junior)
2013	European U23 Championships	(Finland) Tampere	10th	400 m	46.98	
2013	European U23 Championships	(Finland) Tampere	3rd	4x400 m relay	3.05.10	
2017	European Indoor Championships	(Serbia) Belgrade	20th	400 m	48.10	

== National titles ==
- Italian Athletics Indoor Championships
  - 400 metres: 2017

== See also ==
- List of 2010 Summer Youth Olympics medal winners
