= Nikita Uglov =

Russian sprinter

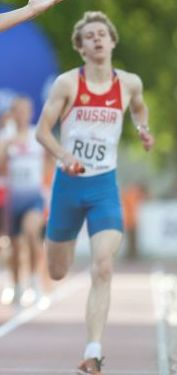
- Uglov at the 2011 European Athletics Junior Championships

Personal information
- Nationality: Russian
- Born: 11 October 1993 (age 32)

Sport
- Sport: Running
- Event: Sprints

Achievements and titles
- Personal best: 400 m: 46.01 (Tallinn 2011)
Medal record
Men's athletics
Representing Russia
European Championships
Disqualified	2014 Zürich	4 x 400 m relay
European U23 Championships
Gold medal – first place	2013 Tampere	4×400 m relay
Bronze medal – third place	2013 Tampere	400 m
European Junior Championships
Silver medal – second place	2011 Tallinn	400 m
Silver medal – second place	2011 Tallinn	4×400 m relay
Summer Youth Olympics
Silver medal – second place	2010 Singapore	Medley relay

Nikita Uglov (Russian: Никита Углов, born 11 October 1993) is a Russian sprinter.

He finished seventh in the 400 metres at the 2010 Summer Youth Olympics in Singapore. He then helped the European mixed-NOC team to win the silver medal in the medley relay.
