= Abraham Rotich =

Kenyan-born Bahraini middle-distance runner

Abraham Kipchirchir Rotich (born 26 June 1993) is a Kenyan-born Bahraini middle-distance runner. Rotich won the 800 metres at the 2012 Diamond League meeting in Monaco.

== Career ==
=== 2012 ===
Rotich opened his 2012 season at the Ostrava Golden Spike meeting on 25 May, placing third in the 800 metres in 1:45.52. He then improved to 1:44.46 in Rehlingen three days later; both times were inside the Olympic qualification standards. However, he only placed fourth at the 2012 Kenyan Olympic trials, missing out on an Olympic berth as the top three were selected.

He then clocked a new personal best of 1:43.62 at Liège on 5 July. He improved further to 1:43.15 two days later at the Heusden-Zolder Night of Athletics, breaking the Kenyan junior record previously held by 2011 World Youth Champion Leonard Kosencha. Only two other athletes had run faster in 2012. Nevertheless, Rotich said he wasn't satisfied with the time.

Rotich made his Diamond League debut on 20 July at Monaco. He won the race in another new personal best of 1:43.13, beating Kosencha in a close finish. The field also included American Duane Solomon, who went on to place fourth at the Olympics three weeks later, and Sudan's 2011 World Championship silver medallist Abubaker Kaki. Rotich made another Diamond League appearance four weeks later at the Stockholm DN Galan, placing third behind Mohammed Aman and Taoufik Makhloufi. In his last race in 2012, he beat Olympic bronze medallist Timothy Kitum over 1000 metres at Dubnica nad Váhom, Slovakia.

Track & Field News ranked Rotich #6 in the world at 800 m.

=== Doping violation and ban ===
In 2021, Rotich was issued with a four-year competition ban for a doping violation due to the use of 19-noretiocholanolone and Norandrosterone.
