= Athletics at the 2011 All-Africa Games – Men's 1500 metres =

The Men's 1500 metres at the 2011 All-Africa Games took place on 14 and 15 September at the Estádio Nacional do Zimpeto.

== Medalists ==
Gold	Caleb Ndiku (KEN)
Silver	Collins Cheboi (KEN)
Bronze	Taoufik Makhloufi (ALG)

== Records ==
Prior to the competition, the following records were as follows.

World record	Hicham El Guerrouj (MAR)	3:26.00	Rome, Italy	14 July 1998
World Leading	Silas Kiplagat (KEN)	3:30.47	Monaco	22 July 2011
African record	Hicham El Guerrouj (MAR)	3:26.00	Rome, Italy	14 July 1998

== Schedule ==
Date	Time	Round
September 11, 2011	18:35	Semifinals
September 13, 2011	19:05	Final

== Results ==
KEY:	q	Fastest non-qualifiers	Q	Qualified	NR	National record	PB	Personal best	SB	Seasonal best

=== Semifinals ===
Qualification: First 5 in each heat (Q) and the next 1 fastest (q) advance to the Final.

Rank	Heat	Name	Nationality	Time	Notes
1	1	Aman Wote	Ethiopia	3:47.29	Q
2	1	Soresa Fida	Ethiopia	3:47.49	Q
3	1	Imad Touil	Algeria	3:47.77	Q
4	1	Abdalla Abdelgadir	Sudan	3:47.98	Q
5	1	Ghyrmay Yowhanes	Eritrea	3:48.90	Q
6	2	Caleb Ndiku	Kenya	3:48.92	Q
7	2	Taoufik Makhloufi	Algeria	3:48.96	Q
8	1	Boaz Lalang	Kenya	3:49.00	q
9	1	Cornelius Panga	Tanzania	3:49.01	
10	2	Collins Cheboi	Kenya	3:49.10	Q
11	2	Dawit Wolde	Ethiopia	3:49.22	Q
12	2	Anyaleh Souleiman	Djibouti	3:49.27	Q
13	2	Osman Yahya	Sudan	3:50.82	
14	1	Godfrey Rutayisire	Rwanda	3:51.41	
15	2	Bazil John	Tanzania	3:52.44	
16	2	Flavio Daniel Seholhi	Mozambique	3:53.90	
17	2	Kristof Shaanika	Namibia	3:55.51	
18	1	Lourenco Antonio	Angola	3:56.34	
19	2	Ngouari Mouissi	Republic of the Congo	3:58.60	
20	2	Moussa Camara	Mali	3:58.85	
21	1	Benjamín Enzema	Equatorial Guinea	4:04.80	
	1	Roberto Mandje	Equatorial Guinea	DNF	

=== Final ===
Rank	Name	Nationality	Time	Notes
1st place, gold medalist(s)	Caleb Ndiku	Kenya	3:39.12	
2nd place, silver medalist(s)	Collins Cheboi	Kenya	3:39.72	
3rd place, bronze medalist(s)	Taoufik Makhloufi	Algeria	3:39.99	
4	Imad Touil	Algeria	3:40.39	
5	Aman Wote	Ethiopia	3:41.04	
6	Anyaleh Souleiman	Djibouti	3:44.77	
7	Soresa Fida	Ethiopia	3:45.10	
8	Ghyrmay Yowhanes	Eritrea	3:45.88	
9	Abdalla Abdelgadir	Sudan	3:48.13	
10	Cornelius Panga	Tanzania	3:48.22	
	Dawit Wolde	Ethiopia	DNF	
	Boaz Lalang	Kenya	DNS	
