= 2017 World Youth Championships in Athletics – Boys' 800 metres =

The Boys' 800 metres at the 2017 World Youth Championships in Athletics was held on 12–15 July.

== Medalists ==
Gold	Silver	Bronze

== Records ==
Prior to the competition, the following records were as follows.

World Youth Best	Mohammed Aman (ETH)	1:43.37	Rieti, Italy	10 September 2011
Championship Record	Leonard Kirwa Kosencha (KEN)	1:44.08	Lille, France	9 July 2011
World Youth Leading	Tolesa Bodena (ETH)	1:47.20	Assela, Ethiopia	16 June 2017

== Heats ==
Qualification rule: first 3 of each heat (Q) and the next 4 fastest qualified.

Rank	Heat	Lane	Name	Nationality	Time	Notes
	1	2	Mikhail Soloshenko	Kyrgyzstan		
	1	3	William Devantier	Denmark		
	1	4	Tolesa Bodena	Ethiopia		
	1	5	José Guillermo Peñalver	Venezuela		
	1	6	Jenito Acirio Guezane	Mozambique		
	1	7	Cristian Gabriel Voicu	Romania		
	1	8	Tyrese Reid	Jamaica		
	2	2	Noah Kiprono	Kenya		
	2	3	Fredd Ponce	Nicaragua		
	2	4	Mihai Razvan Vasiliu	Romania		
	2	5	Juan Diego Castro	Costa Rica		
	2	6	Abdellah Mouzlib	Morocco		
	2	7	Kimar Farquharson	Jamaica		
	2	8	Erdem Öz	Turkey		
	3	2	Marco Vilca	Peru		
	3	3	Rok Markelj	Slovenia		
	3	4	Melese Nberet	Ethiopia		
	3	5	Joshua Kibet	Uganda		
	3	6	Eduardas Rimas Survilas	Lithuania		
	3	7	Alfred Chawonza	Zimbabwe		
	3	8	Oussama Cherrad	Algeria		
	4	2	Jan Vukovic	Slovenia		
	4	3	Ntuthuko Ndimande	South Africa		
	4	4	Japhet Kibiwott Toroitich	Kenya		
	4	5	Stavros Spyrou	Cyprus		
	4	6	Diego Facundo Alegre	Argentina		
	4	7	Bekele Apenyo	Uganda		
	4	8	Charaf Zahir	Morocco		
