= Athletics at the 2015 African Games – Men's 800 metres =

The men's 800 metres event at the 2015 African Games was held on 13 and 15 September.

== Medalists ==
Gold	Silver	Bronze
Nijel Amos; Botswana	Taoufik Makhloufi; Algeria	Job Kinyor; Kenya

== Results ==
=== Heats ===
Qualification: First 2 in each heat (Q) and the next 2 fastest (q) advanced to the final.

Rank	Heat	Name	Nationality	Time	Notes
1	2	Jackson Kivuva	Kenya	1:46.65	Q
2	2	Boitumelo Masilo	Botswana	1:46.80	Q, SB
3	2	Alberto Mamba	Mozambique	1:46.80	q
4	2	Mengistu Alemu	Ethiopia	1:46.88	q
5	3	Job Kinyor	Kenya	1:49.38	Q
6	3	Taoufik Makhloufi	Algeria	1:49.44	Q
7	1	Nijel Amos	Botswana	1:50.00	Q
8	1	Timothy Kitum	Kenya	1:50.07	Q
9	1	Yassine Hathat	Algeria	1:50.27	
10	3	Alex Ngouare Moissi	Republic of the Congo	1:50.73	
11	1	Fozi Mohamed Ramadan	Djibouti	1:51.06	
12	3	Adam Fathee	Sudan	1:51.30	
13	3	Yobsan Girma	Ethiopia	1:51.49	
14	1	Moussa Camara	Mali	1:51.81	
15	2	Abdelkerim Mehemmed	Eritrea	1:52.33	
16	3	Jimmy Adar	Uganda	1:52.34	
16	1	Dey Dey Tuach	South Sudan	1:52.93	
17	2	Abraham Guot Thon	South Sudan	1:53.18	
18	1	Benjamín Enzema	Equatorial Guinea	1:53.35	NR
19	2	Daher Abdoulfatah	Djibouti	1:53.67	
20	3	Ahmed Hussein Hassan	Somalia	1:54.83	
21	3	Joseph Akoon Akoon	South Sudan	1:58.23	
	2	Ismail Ahmed Ismail	Sudan	DNF	
	1	Kevin Bobando	Republic of the Congo	DNS	
	1	Jena Umar	Ethiopia	DNS	

=== Final ===
Rank	Name	Nationality	Time	Notes
1st place, gold medalist(s)	Nijel Amos	Botswana	1:50.45	
2nd place, silver medalist(s)	Taoufik Makhloufi	Algeria	1:50.72	
3rd place, bronze medalist(s)	Job Kinyor	Kenya	1:50.79	
4	Timothy Kitum	Kenya	1:50.93	
5	Jackson Kivuva	Kenya	1:50.98	
6	Mengistu Alemu	Ethiopia	1:52.11	
7	Alberto Mamba	Mozambique	1:52.15	
8	Boitumelo Masilo	Botswana	1:52.35	
