= Cheboi =

Cheboi is a surname of Kenyan origin. Notable people with the surname include:

- Collins Cheboi (born 1987), Kenyan middle-distance runner
- Ezekiel Kemboi Cheboi (born 1982), Kenyan steeplechase runner

== See also ==
- Cheboin
