= Athletics at the 2011 All-Africa Games – Men's 800 metres =

The Men's 800 metres at the 2011 All-Africa Games took place on 11 and 13 September at the Estádio Nacional do Zimpeto.

== Medalists ==
Gold	Taoufik Makhloufi (ALG)
Silver	Boaz Lalang (KEN)
Bronze	Job Kinyor (KEN)

== Records ==
Prior to the competition, the following records were as follows.

World record	David Rudisha (KEN)	1:41.01	Rieti, Italy	29 August 2010
World leading	David Rudisha (KEN)	1:42.61	Monaco	22 July 2011
African record	David Rudisha (KEN)	1:41.01	Rieti, Italy	29 August 2010

== Schedule ==
Date	Time	Round
September 11, 2011	20:00	Semifinals
September 13, 2011	19:10	Final

== Results ==
KEY:	q	Fastest non-qualifiers	Q	Qualified	NR	National record	PB	Personal best	SB	Seasonal best

=== Heats ===
Qualification: First 2 in each heat (Q) and the next 2 fastest (q) advance to the Final.

Rank	Heat	Name	Nationality	Time	Notes
1	1	Taoufik Makhloufi	Algeria	1:47.50	Q
2	1	Job Kinyor	Kenya	1:47.80	Q
3	1	Prince Mumba	Zambia	1:48.15	q
4	2	David Mutua	Kenya	1:48.69	Q
5	2	Esrael Awoke	Ethiopia	1:49.35	Q
6	1	Shiferaw Wola	Ethiopia	1:49.49	q
7	3	Boaz Lalang	Kenya	1:49.50	Q
8	3	Ghyrmay Yowhanes	Eritrea	1:49.71	Q
9	2	Moussa Camara	Mali	1:49.99	
10	2	Isaac Seoke	Botswana	1:50.20	
11	3	Teshome Weyessa	Ethiopia	1:50.29	
12	1	Kristof Shaanika	Namibia	1:50.91	
13	3	Daniel Nghipandulwa	Namibia	1:51.13	
14	1	Wilyam Philip	Sudan	1:51.66	
15	3	Ntawuyirushimtege Pomt	Rwanda	1:52.26	
16	2	Osman Yahya	Sudan	1:52.54	
17	2	Samuel Ibraimo Machava	Mozambique	1:53.42	
18	1	Manuel António	Angola	1:53.90	
19	2	Ngouari Mouissi	Republic of the Congo	1:54.60	
20	3	Benjamín Enzema	Equatorial Guinea	1:57.87	NR
21	2	Lusanga Kafwa Rosel	Democratic Republic of the Congo	1:58.00	
22	1	Frederic Vaz	Cape Verde	1:59.81	
	3	Ismail Ahmed Ismail	Sudan	DNS	

=== Final ===
Rank	Name	Nationality	Time	Notes
1st place, gold medalist(s)	Taoufik Makhloufi	Algeria	1:46.32	
2nd place, silver medalist(s)	Boaz Lalang	Kenya	1:46.40	
3rd place, bronze medalist(s)	Job Kinyor	Kenya	1:46.52	
4	Prince Mumba	Zambia	1:47.04	
5	Ghyrmay Yowhanes	Eritrea	1:47.47	
6	David Mutua	Kenya	1:47.81	
7	Shiferaw Wola	Ethiopia	1:47.95	
8	Esrael Awoke	Ethiopia	1:49.86	
