= Job Koech Kinyor =

Kenyan middle-distance runner

Medal record

Men's athletics

Representing Kenya

All-Africa Games
Bronze medal – third place	2011 Maputo	800 metres
Bronze medal – third place	2015 Brazzaville	800 metres

IAAF World Relays
Gold medal – first place	2014 Nassau	4×800 m relay

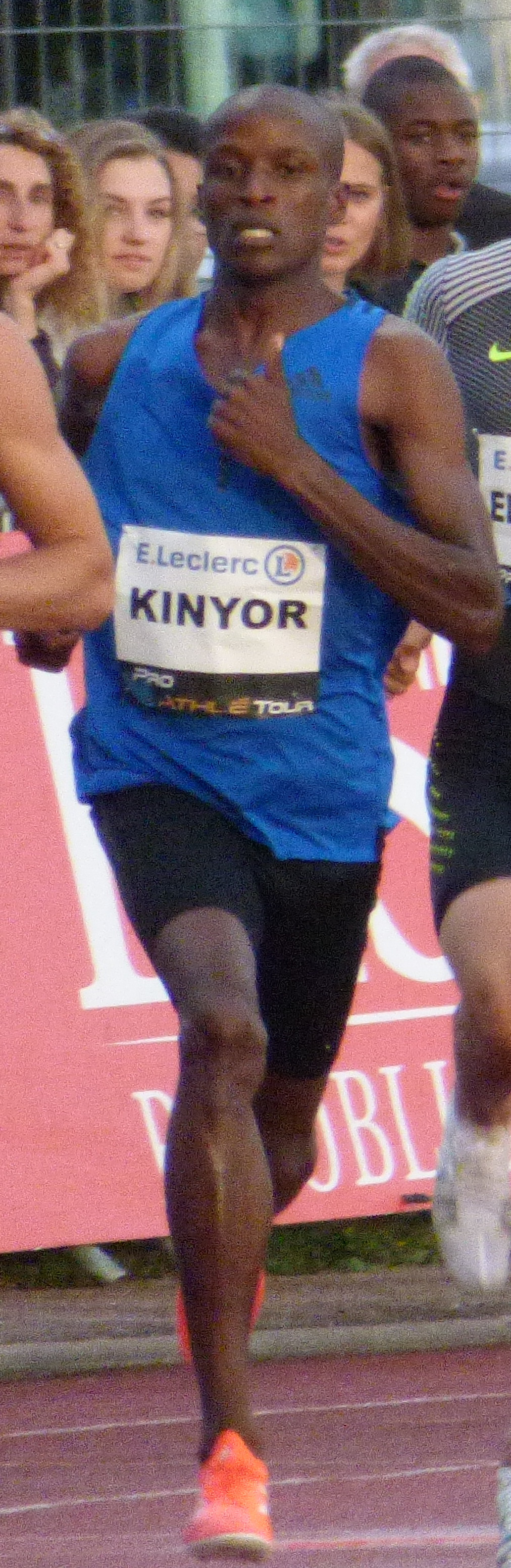
Job Koech Kinyor

Job Koech Kinyor (born 2 September 1990) is a Kenyan middle-distance runner who competes in the 800 metres. His personal best for the distance is 1:43.76 minutes. He was a bronze medallist at the 2011 and 2015 All-Africa Games, and he was part of the gold medal-winning team in the 4×800 metres relay at the 2014 IAAF World Relays.

He is the son of former Olympic hurdler Barnabas Kinyor and has two children.

== Career ==
He first began competing abroad in 2008 and set a personal best of 1:47.00 minutes to take third at the Folksam Grand Prix. He did not compete in 2009, but returned an improved athlete the following year. He won a number of low-level European meets in 2010, with the highlights being a win at the Notturna di Milano and a personal best run of 1:45.86 minutes for third at the Hanžeković Memorial. A fourth-place finish at the 2011 Kenyan Athletics Championships in a new best of 1:45.07 minutes brought him his first international selection. At the 2011 All-Africa Games he finished behind future Olympic champion Taoufik Makhloufi and fellow Kenyan Boaz Lalang to take the 800 m bronze medal.

At the start of the 2012 season Kinyor made a big improvement to 1:43.76 minutes at the Doha Diamond League race, finishing as runner-up to David Rudisha. He came third at the FBK Games, seventh at the Prefontaine Classic and second at the London Grand Prix. However, he failed to make the Kenyan team for the 2012 Summer Olympics, placing fifth at the trials. He began the next season in similar fashion, running his season's best of 1:44.24 minutes to finish third on the Doha leg of the 2013 IAAF Diamond League, placing behind Rudisha and Mohamed Aman. He came in the top five in the Prefontaine Classic, Golden Gala and London Grand Prix meets that year. He won at the national championships, but was fourth at the Kenyan trials for the 2013 World Championships in Athletics, missing selection again.

Kinyor was chosen for the 2014 IAAF World Relays to represent Kenya in the 4×800 metres relay and the team (featuring Ferguson Cheruiyot Rotich, Sammy Kibet Kirongo, and Alfred Kipketer) went on to win the gold medal in a time of 7:08.40 minutes.

He served as a pacemaker on the 2017 IAAF Diamond League, but was some distance away from the pack.
