= Nemanja Kojić =

Nemanja Kojić may refer to:

- Nemanja Kojić (footballer) (born 1990), Serbian footballer who plays as a striker
- Nemanja Kojić (musician) (born 1975), Serbian musician better known by his stage name Hornsman Coyote (or Kojot)
- Nemanja Kojić (runner) (born 1994), Serbian middle-distance track athlete who specializes in the 800 metres
