= Mohammad Dookun =

Mauritian long-distance runner

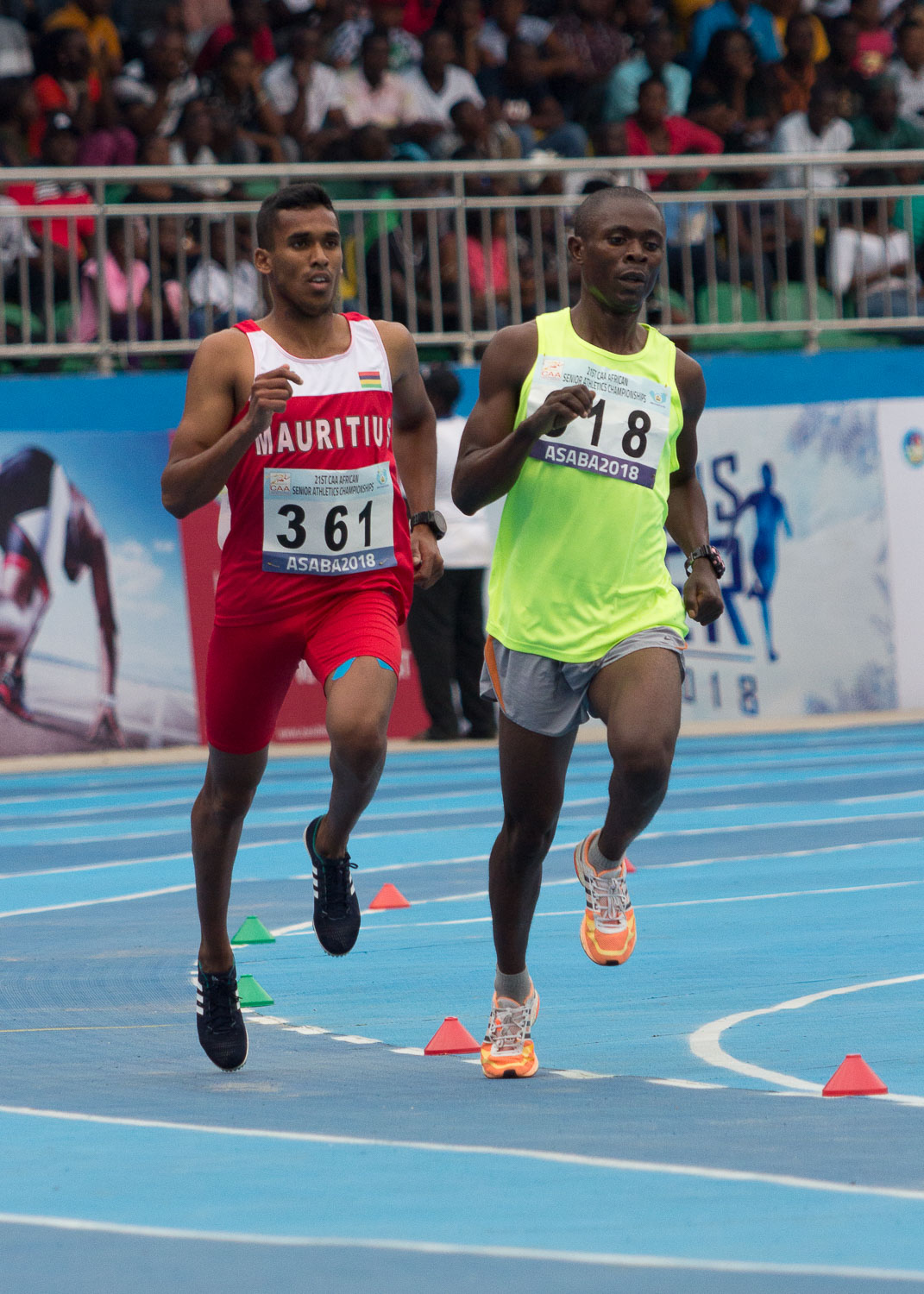
- Mohammad Dookun at the 2018 African Athletics Championships

Personal information
- Born: 20 July 1993 (age 32) Forest Side, Mauritius
- Height: 1.69 m (5 ft 7 in)

Sport
- Country: Mauritius
- Sport: Long-distance running

Mohammad Dookun (born 20 July 1993) is a Mauritian long-distance runner. In 2019, he competed in the senior men's race at the 2019 IAAF World Cross Country Championships held in Aarhus, Denmark. He finished in 119th place.

In 2016, he competed in the men's 800 metres and men's 1500 metres events at the 2016 African Championships in Athletics held in Durban, South Africa.

In 2018, he represented Mauritius at the 2018 Commonwealth Games held in Gold Coast, Australia. He competed in the men's 1500 metres event. He did not qualify to compete in the final.
