= 2016 African Championships in Athletics – Men's 800 metres =

The men's 800 metres event at the 2016 African Championships in Athletics was held on 22, 23 and 24 June in Kings Park Stadium.

== Medalists ==
| Gold | Silver | Bronze |
|---|---|---|
| Nijel Amos; Botswana | Jacob Rozani; South Africa | Rynhardt van Rensburg; South Africa |

== Results ==
=== Heats ===
Qualification: First 3 of each heat (Q) and the next 4 fastest (q) qualified for the semifinals.

| Rank | Heat | Name | Nationality | Time | Notes |
|---|---|---|---|---|---|
| 1 | 3 | Boaz Kiprugut | Kenya | 1:48.63 | Q |
| 2 | 3 | Sampson Laari | Ghana | 1:48.80 | Q |
| 3 | 4 | Jacob Rozani | South Africa | 1:49.91 | Q |
| 4 | 3 | Kabelo Mohlosi | South Africa | 1:49.94 | Q |
| 5 | 1 | Nijel Amos | Botswana | 1:50.19 | Q |
| 6 | 4 | Bacha Morka | Ethiopia | 1:50.25 | Q |
| 7 | 3 | Nyasha Mutsetse | Zimbabwe | 1:50.34 | q |
| 8 | 1 | Albertino Mamba | Mozambique | 1:50.39 | Q |
| 9 | 4 | Mohammad Dookun | Mauritius | 1:50.88 | Q |
| 10 | 1 | Moussa Camara | Mali | 1:51.08 | Q |
| 11 | 1 | Dey Dey | South Sudan | 1:53.20 | q |
| 12 | 3 | Fathi Ahmed Adam | Sudan | 1:53.82 | q |
| 13 | 3 | Abraham Matet | South Sudan | 1:54.85 | q |
| 14 | 4 | Abraham Guot Thon | South Sudan | 2:02.03 | |
| 15 | 2 | Benedicto Makumba | Malawi | 2:02.22 | Q |
| 16 | 2 | Boitumelo Masilo | Botswana | 2:02.57 | Q |
| 17 | 2 | Rynhardt van Rensburg | South Africa | 2:02.81 | Q |
| | 1 | Yobsan Girma | Ethiopia | DNS | |
| | 1 | Benjamín Enzema | Equatorial Guinea | DNS | |
| | 1 | Lumpongu | Democratic Republic of the Congo | DNS | |
| | 2 | Abubaker Kaki Khamis | Sudan | DNS | |
| | 2 | Feysal Mohamed Adan | Somalia | DNS | |
| | 2 | Daniel Nghipandulwa | Namibia | DNS | |
| | 2 | Adisa Girma | Ethiopia | DNS | |
| | 3 | Eric Nzikwinkunda | Burundi | DNS | |
| | 4 | Kevin Bobando | Republic of the Congo | DNS | |
| | 4 | Samuel Yaro | Ghana | DNS | |
| | 4 | Lamin Keita | Gambia | DNS | |
| | 4 | Gift Ngwenya | Zimbabwe | DNS | |

=== Semifinals ===
Qualification: First 3 of each heat (Q) and the next 2 fastest (q) qualified for the final.

| Rank | Heat | Name | Nationality | Time | Notes |
|---|---|---|---|---|---|
| 1 | 2 | Albertino Mamba | Mozambique | 1:48.36 | Q |
| 2 | 2 | Sampson Laari | Ghana | 1:48.46 | Q |
| 3 | 2 | Jacob Rozani | South Africa | 1:48.48 | Q |
| 4 | 2 | Boitumelo Masilo | Botswana | 1:48.52 | q |
| 5 | 2 | Nyasha Mutsetse | Zimbabwe | 1:49.69 | q |
| 6 | 1 | Nijel Amos | Botswana | 1:49.91 | Q |
| 7 | 1 | Rynhardt van Rensburg | South Africa | 1:50.55 | Q |
| 8 | 1 | Kabelo Mohlosi | South Africa | 1:51.30 | Q |
| 9 | 1 | Moussa Camara | Mali | 1:51.59 | |
| 10 | 1 | Mohammad Dookun | Mauritius | 1:52.45 | |
| 11 | 1 | Dey Dey | South Sudan | 1:52.91 | |
| 12 | 1 | Fathi Ahmed Adam | Sudan | 1:53.39 | |
| 13 | 2 | Bacha Morka | Ethiopia | 1:56.21 | |
| 14 | 2 | Benedicto Makumba | Malawi | 2:00.46 | |
| | 1 | Boaz Kiprugut | Kenya | DQ | |
| | 2 | Abraham Matet | South Sudan | DQ | |

=== Final ===
| Rank | Athlete | Nationality | Time | Notes |
|---|---|---|---|---|
| 1st place, gold medalist(s) | Nijel Amos | Botswana | 1:45.11 | |
| 2nd place, silver medalist(s) | Jacob Rozani | South Africa | 1:45.38 | |
| 3rd place, bronze medalist(s) | Rynhardt van Rensburg | South Africa | 1:46.15 | |
| 4 | Boitumelo Masilo | Botswana | 1:46.16 | |
| 5 | Albertino Mamba | Mozambique | 1:46.34 | |
| 6 | Sampson Laari | Ghana | 1:47.62 | |
| 7 | Kabelo Mohlosi | South Africa | 1:50.00 | |
| 8 | Nyasha Mutsetse | Zimbabwe | 1:50.90 | |
