= Dumisane Hlaselo =

South African middle-distance runner

Personal information
- Born: 8 June 1989 (age 36)

Sport
- Sport: Track and field
- Event: 1500 metres

Dumisane Hlaselo (born 8 June 1989) is a South African middle-distance runner competing primarily in the 1500 metres. He represented his country at the 2015 World Championships in Athletics in Beijing narrowly missing the semifinals.

Hlaselo competed for the Florida Gators track and field team in the NCAA. In June 2011, he was arrested for sexual assault and was kicked off the team. He was charged and tried in Alachua County in September 2011 and convicted in October.

== International competitions ==
Year	Competition	Venue	Position	Event	Notes
Representing South Africa
2005	World Youth Championships	Marrakesh, Morocco	5th	1500 m	3:48.23
2007	African Junior Championships	Ouagadougou, Burkina Faso	3rd	1500 m	3:49.25
2008	World Junior Championships	Bydgoszcz, Poland	10th	1500 m	3:51.71
2015	World Championships	Beijing, China	21st (h)	1500 m	3:40.25
2015	African Games	Brazzaville, Republic of the Congo	10th	1500 m	3:51.64
2015	African Games	Brazzaville, Republic of the Congo	–	5000 m	DNF
2016	African Championships	Durban, South Africa	8th	1500 m	3:44.53

== Personal bests ==
=== Outdoor ===
- 800 metres – 1:48.31 (Pretoria 2008)
- 1500 metres – 3:36.36 (Tomblaine 2015)
- One mile – 4:13.49 (Port Elizabeth 2014)
- 3000 metres – 7:59.31 (Stellenbosch 2013)
- 5000 metres – 13:47.23 (Stellenbosch 2013)

=== Indoor ===
- One mile – 4:00.97 (College Station 2011)
- 3000 metres – 8:00.43 (Fayetteville 2011)
