= 2012 African Championships in Athletics – Men's 800 metres =

The men's 800 metres at the 2012 African Championships in Athletics was held at the Stade Charles de Gaulle on 28 and 29 June.

== Medalists ==
Gold	Taoufik Makhloufi; Algeria
Silver	Anthony Chemut; Kenya
Bronze	André Oliver; South Africa

== Records ==
Standing records prior to the 2012 African Championships in Athletics
World record	David Rudisha (KEN)	1:41.01	Rieti, Italy	29 August 2010
African record	David Rudisha (KEN)	1:41.01	Rieti, Italy	29 August 2010
Championship record	David Rudisha (KEN)	1:42.84	Nairobi, Kenya	30 July 2010

== Schedule ==
Date	Time	Round
28 June 2012	15:30	Round 1
29 June 2012	16:30	Final

== Results ==
=== Round 1 ===
First 2 in each heat (Q) and 2 best performers (q) advance to the Final.

Rank	Heat	Lane	Name	Nationality	Time	Note
1	2	1	Taoufik Makhloufi	Algeria	1:46.15	Q
2	3	4	André Oliver	South Africa	1:46.63	Q
3	2	6	Anthony Chemut	Kenya	1:46.78	Q
4	2	2	Shiferaw Wola	Ethiopia	1:47.27	q
5	2	4	Isaac Seokle	Botswana	1:47.90	q
6	3	7	Cornelious Kiplagat	Kenya	1:47.92	Q
7	3	2	Julius Mutekanga	Uganda	1:48.66	
8	1	1	Moussa Camara	Mali	1:48.71	Q
9	1	8	Mamush Lencha	Ethiopia	1:48.98	Q
10	1	3	Severin Sahinkuye	Burundi	1:49.13	
11	3	8	Esrael Awoke	Ethiopia	1:49.18	
12	1	6	Lumax Selasi	Ghana	1:49.29	
13	1	5	Rynhardt van Rensburg	South Africa	1:50.12	
14	2	5	Mor Seck	Senegal	1:50.17	
15	3	1	Daniel Nghipandula	Namibia	1:50.85	
16	2	8	Tarek Eshebli	Libya	1:51.86	
17	3	6i	Omar Jammeh	Gambia	1:52.96	
18	2	3	Mahazou Alassane	Benin	1:52.98	
19	3	3	Jacouba Boubacar Soumana	Niger	1:54.42	
20	1	4	Ali Ahmed Mohamed	Djibouti	1:54.85	
21	3	5	Ramadhan Hamed	Libya	1:55.16	Q
22	3	6e	Benjamín Enzema	Equatorial Guinea	1:56.23	NR
23	1	2	Mathieu Kiplagat Sawe	Kenya	1:56.29	
	1	7	Nigel Amos	Botswana	DNS	
	2	7	Abdelkerim Mohammed	Eritrea	DNS	

=== Final ===
Rank	Lane	Name	Nationality	Time	Note
1st place, gold medalist(s)	3	Taoufik Makhloufi	Algeria	1:43.88	
2nd place, silver medalist(s)	4	Anthony Chemut	Kenya	1:44.53	
3rd place, bronze medalist(s)	5	André Oliver	South Africa	1:45.09	
4	6	Cornelious Kiplagat	Kenya	1:47.83	
5	1	Shiferaw Wola	Ethiopia	1:48.26	
6	7	Isaac Seokle	Botswana	1:48.39	
7	2	Mamush Lencha Shirko	Ethiopia	1:48.98	
8	8	Moussa Camara	Mali	1:49.12	
