= 2016 African Championships in Athletics – Men's 1500 metres =

The men's 1500 metres event at the 2016 African Championships in Athletics was held on 25 and 26 June in Kings Park Stadium.

== Medalists ==
Gold	Silver	Bronze
Fouad El Kaam; Morocco	Timothy Cheruiyot; Kenya	Vincent Letting; Kenya

== Results ==
=== Heats ===
Qualification: First 5 of each heat (Q) and the next 2 fastest (q) qualified for the final.

Rank	Heat	Name	Nationality	Time	Notes
1	2	Timothy Cheruiyot	Kenya	3:44.44	Q
2	2	Taresa Tolosa	Ethiopia	3:44.58	Q
3	2	Eric Kiptanui	Kenya	3:44.66	Q
4	2	Younés Essalhi	Morocco	3:44.70	Q
5	1	Fouad El Kaam	Morocco	3:46.48	Q
6	2	Santino Kenyi	South Sudan	3:47.31	Q
7	1	Vincent Letting	Kenya	3:47.80	Q
8	1	Birhanu Sorsa	Ethiopia	3:48.43	Q
9	2	Dey Dey	South Sudan	3:48.43	q
10	1	Dumisani Hlaselo	South Africa	3:50.58	Q
11	2	Oskear Komeya	Namibia	3:51.55	
12	1	Wellington Varevi	Zimbabwe	3:51.70	Q
13	1	Sylvester Koko	Botswana	3:52.31	
14	1	Mohammad Dookun	Mauritius	3:54.48	
15	1	Moussa Camara	Mali	3:54.76	
16	1	Abraham Matet	South Sudan	3:55.14	
17	2	Johan Cronje	South Africa	3:56.12	q
18	1	Benjamín Enzema	Equatorial Guinea	4:11.87	
	1	Benedicto Makumba	Malawi	DNS	
	1	Daud Mohamed Abubakar	Somalia	DNS	
	1	Zemen Addis	Ethiopia	DNS	
	1	Raoul Yeguelet Yeliti	Central African Republic	DNS	
	2	Abubaker Kaki Khamis	Sudan	DNS	
	2	Alex Ngouari Mouissi	Republic of the Congo	DNS	
	2	Lamin Keita	Gambia	DNS	
	2	Patrick Nibafasha	Burundi	DNS	
	2	Nyasha Mutsetse	Zimbabwe	DNS	
	2	Yach Wol	South Sudan	DNS	

=== Final ===
Rank	Athlete	Nationality	Time	Notes
1st place, gold medalist(s)	Fouad El Kaam	Morocco	3:39.49	
2nd place, silver medalist(s)	Timothy Cheruiyot	Kenya	3:39.71	
3rd place, bronze medalist(s)	Vincent Letting	Kenya	3:40.78	
4	Younés Essalhi	Morocco	3:41.34	
5	Taresa Tolosa	Ethiopia	3:42.23	
6	Birhanu Sorsa	Ethiopia	3:43.56	
7	Eric Kiptanui	Kenya	3:43.81	
8	Dumisani Hlaselo	South Africa	3:44.53	
9	Johan Cronje	South Africa	3:45.26	
10	Santino Kenyi	South Sudan	3:45.34	NR
11	Wellington Varevi	Zimbabwe	3:48.40	
12	Dey Dey	South Sudan	3:48.70	
