= Anthony Romaniw =

Canadian middle-distance runner

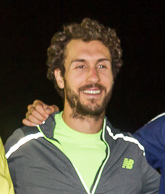

Personal information
- Born: September 15, 1991 (age 34) Hamilton, Ontario
- Education: University of Guelph; Dartmouth College
- Height: 1.80 m (5 ft 11 in)
- Weight: 80 kg (180 lb)

Sport
- Country: Canada
- Sport: Athletics
- Event: 800 metres

Achievements and titles
- Personal best: 800 = 1:45.60

Anthony Michael Romaniw (born September 15, 1991 in Hamilton, Ontario) is a Canadian track and field athlete competing in the middle-distance events, predominantly the 800m event. He competed in the 800 metres at the 2015 Pan American Games in Toronto, where he finished 15th. He represented his country at the 2016 Summer Olympics without reaching the semifinals.

At St. Thomas More Catholic Secondary School, Romaniw was a four sport star in track and cross country where he was the MVP on both teams, badminton and was the captain of the hockey team three times. He ran two years at Dartmouth College before moving back home to finish at the University of Guelph.

== International competitions ==
Year	Competition	Venue	Position	Event	Notes
Representing Canada
2010	World Junior Championships	Moncton, Canada	12th (h)	800 m	1:49.26
2013	Universiade	Kazan, Russia	7th	800 m	1:49.04
2013	World Championships	Moscow, Russia	34th (h)	800 m	1:47.98
2015	Pan American Games	Toronto, Canada	15th (h)	800 m	1:56.55
2016	Olympic Games	Rio de Janeiro, Brazil	27th (h)	800 m	1:47.59
