= Taoufik Makhloufi =

Algerian track and field athlete

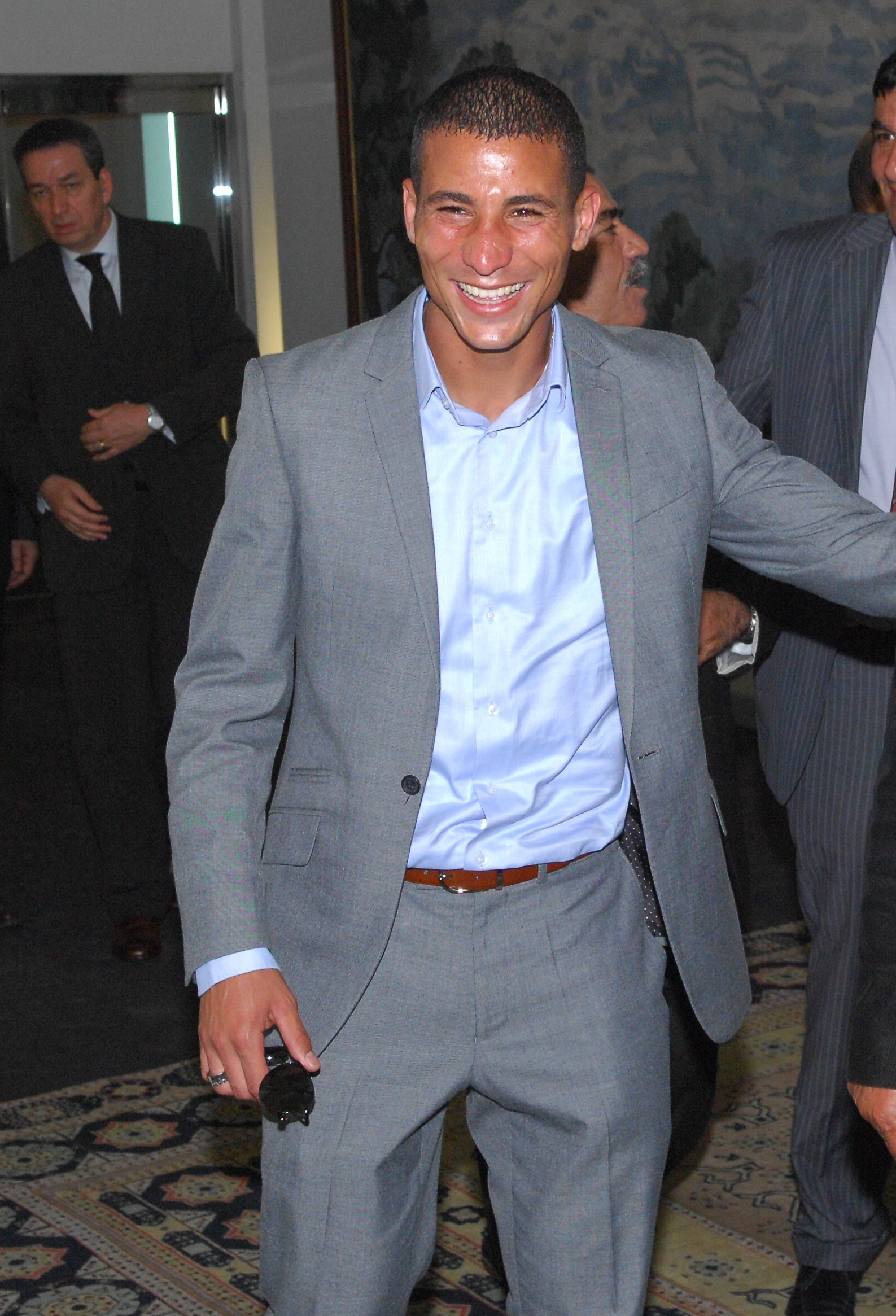
- Makhloufi in 2013

Personal information
- Native name: توفيق مخلوفي
- Nationality: Algeria
- Born: 29 April 1988 (age 38) Souk Ahras, Algeria
- Height: 176 cm (5 ft 9 in)
- Weight: 70 kg (154 lb)

Sport
- Country: Algeria
- Sport: Athletics
- Event: Middle-distance running
- Club: GS Pétroliers
- Coached by: Jama Aden (2012–14); Philippe Dupont (2015–)

Achievements and titles
- Personal bests: 800 m: 1:42.61 (2016); 1000 m: 2:13.08 NR (2015); 1500 m: 3:28.75 (2015)
Medal record
Men's athletics
Representing Algeria
Olympic Games
Gold medal – first place	2012 London	1500 m
Silver medal – second place	2016 Rio de Janeiro	800 m
Silver medal – second place	2016 Rio de Janeiro	1500 m
World Championships
Silver medal – second place	2019 Doha	1500 m
African Games
Gold medal – first place	2011 Maputo	800 m
Silver medal – second place	2015 Brazzaville	800 m
Bronze medal – third place	2011 Maputo	1500 m
African Championships
Gold medal – first place	2012 Porto-Novo	800 m
Bronze medal – third place	2014 Marrakesh	800 m

Taoufik Makhloufi (Arabic: توفيق مخلوفي; born 29 April 1988) is an Algerian athlete who specialises in middle-distance running. He became the 1500 metres Olympic champion at the 2012 Summer Olympics in London, England. In 2016, Makhloufi took the silver medal in the 800m and 1500 m at the Summer Olympics in Rio de Janeiro, Brazil.

He was also the 800 metres gold medallist at the 2012 African Championships and the 2011 All-Africa Games. He has represented Algeria three times at the World Championships in Athletics. His personal bests are 1:42.61 for the 800 m, set at the 2016 Olympics, and 3:28.75 for the 1500 metres. He trains with GS Pétroliers.

== Career ==
Born in Souk Ahras, Makhloufi made his international debut at the 2007 IAAF World Cross Country Championships, where he finished 82nd in the 8 km junior race. He began competing at the senior level in 2009 and at the 2009 Mediterranean Games he placed fourth in the 1500 metres. An appearance at the Golden Gala meeting followed soon after and he ran a personal best of 3:34.34 minutes. He won his first national title that year and represented his country at the 2009 World Championships in Athletics, where he was a semi-finalist. In 2010 he improved his best to 3:32.94 minutes at the Herculis meeting and ranked among the top twenty that year. He reached the 1500 m final at the 2010 African Championships in Athletics, but failed to finish.

Makhloufi's fastest run of 2011 (3:34.4 minutes) came at a national meeting in Algiers and he competed twice on the 2011 Diamond League circuit (in Doha and Stockholm). After taking his second Algerian 1500 m title, he was again selected for the World Championships team and again reached the semi-final stage. It was at the 2011 All-Africa Games that he made his international breakthrough. He won the 1500 m bronze medal behind Kenyan opposition, then defeated the much more favoured Boaz Kiplagat Lalang in the 800 metres final to take his first continental gold medal.

=== 2012 Summer Olympics ===
Following this success he began to compete more frequently in the 800 m in the 2012 season. His first 1500 m race of the season was a runner-up finish at the Rabat Meeting and he improved his 800 m best to 1:44.88 minutes in Stockholm. Building upon his previous African title, a tactical mistake by the leading Kenyan runners helped Makhloufi win the 800 m title at the 2012 African Championships in Athletics, setting a personal best of 1:43.88 minutes in the process. On 20 July he set a new personal best at the 1500 m at Herculis meeting in Monaco with a time 3:30.80.

He achieved the qualifying standard for the 1500 m and 800 m and was entered in both races at the 2012 Summer Olympics. He reached the 1500 m final after winning his heat and semi-final. The Algerian Olympic Association had failed to withdraw him from the 800 m event, which he no longer wished to compete in, and he was forced to enter the race. Makhloufi slowed and dropped out in the early stages of his 800 m – a performance that led to him being disqualified from the Games as the IAAF referee "considered that he had not provided a bona fide effort". However, he was re-instated after producing an independent medical certificate showing that an ailment had hampered his efforts. The following day, Makhloufi won the 1500 m Olympic final with a time of 3:34.08 minutes, clocking the last lap in 52.76 sec defeating among others the reigning Olympic champion Asbel Kiprop. This performance surprised critics given his previous medical statement and the quality of the field. Makhloufi explained that his improvements stemmed from a change of coach and his intensive training that year.

In early June 2013, while in preparation in Barcelona for the 2013 World Championships in Athletics, he contracted liver disease (hepatitis A) and was hospitalized on June 12. He only ran the Mile race in Eugene, Oregon on June 1, 2013 and later announced not participating at the world championships in Moscow that year.

In February 2014, he started his preparation in the US, and later in Iten (Kenya), joining Mohamed Farah’s training team. Later that year, he ran several races, setting new personal bests in the 1500 m in the Doha Diamond League meeting on May 9 with a time of 3:30.40 (finishing fourth in a race won by Asbel Kiprop), and the 800 m in Berlin, with 1:43.53 on August 31 (finishing second to Mohamed Aman).

On 1 July 2015, he won the European Athletics Classic meet 1000m in Tomblaine, France in a new Algerian record of 2:13.08 beating the existing record set by Noureddine Morceli since 1993.

=== 2016 Summer Olympics ===
On 15 August 2016, he set a new personal best and Algerian record in the 800m final at the Olympic Games in Rio de Janeiro with a time of 1:42:61, finishing second behind David Rudisha from Kenya. Only 8 hours later, he started the qualifying rounds of the 1500 m, reaching the final, where he won his second silver medal of the Olympics (and third overall) behind Matthew Centrowitz in a slow tactical race.

Makhloufi missed the entire 2017 and 2018 seasons due to injury and couldn't take part of the 2017 World Athletics Championships in London. He finished second behind Kenyan Timothy Cheruiyot in the 1500 m at the 2019 World Championships in Athletics in Doha winning his first medal at a world championship with a season best time of 3:31.38.

=== 2020 Summer Olympics ===
In 2019, Makhloufi was awarded the Medal of Order of Merit by the Algerian government as a compensation of his outstanding sport career representing Algeria in international competitions.

In March 2020, Makhloufi travelled to South Africa to prepare for the planned 2020 Summer Olympics on high altitude, but was trapped by the pandemic and was unable to return to Algeria until late July 2020. Makhloufi expressed his anger on social media and criticized the Algerian authorities for not doing their best to get him back after the Olympics were postponed. He dismissed his training camp planned in Mexico on January 10, 2021 due to an injury that he was treating in Algeria and continued his preparations for the 2020 Summer Olympics where he qualified for the 1500 m event after achieving the qualification standard in the 2019 World Athletics Championships. Though he had not raced since October 2019, Makhloufi was entered to run in the 1500 metres event at the 2020 Summer Olympics; however before the start of competition he withdrew due to a knee injury.

== Achievements ==
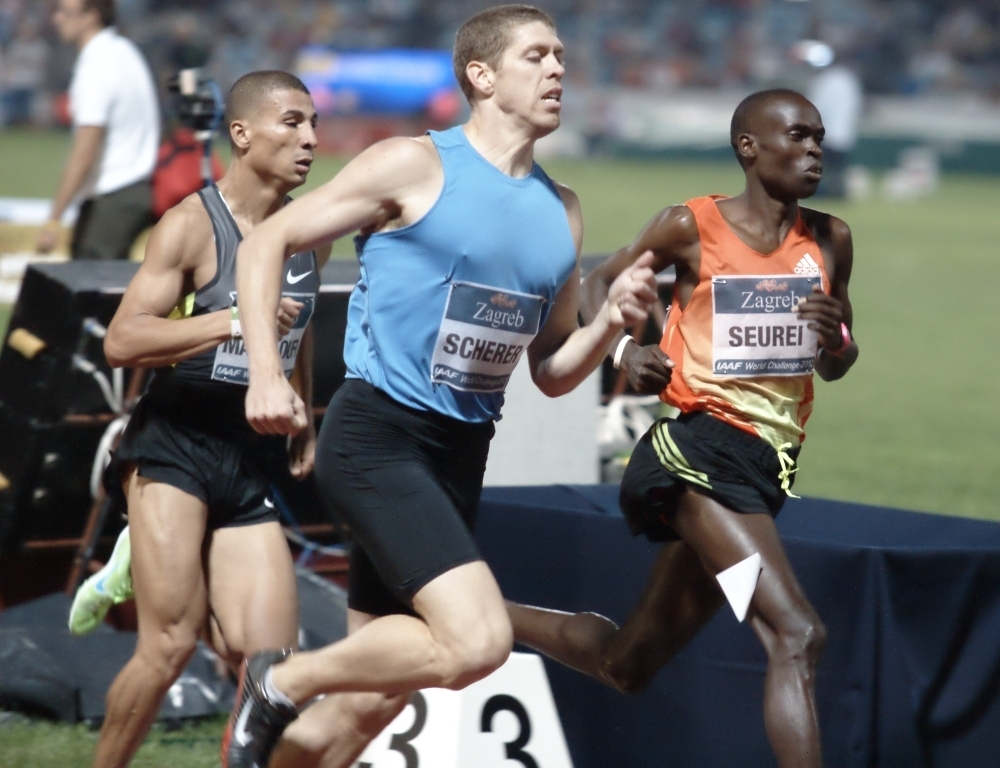
Makhloufi (left) competing on 1500 m in Zagreb, 2012

Year	Competition	Venue	Position	Event	Notes
Representing Algeria
2007	World Cross Country Championships	Mombasa, Kenya	82nd	Junior race	
2009	Mediterranean Games	Pescara, Italy	4th	1500 m	3:39.37
2009	World Championships	Berlin, Germany	17th (sf)	1500 m	3:37.87
2010	African Championships	Nairobi, Kenya	12th	1500 m	DNF
2011	World Championships	Daegu, South Korea	24th (sf)	1500 m	3:50.86
2011	All-Africa Games	Maputo, Mozambique	1st	800 m	1:46:32
2011	All-Africa Games	Maputo, Mozambique	3rd	1500 m	3:39.99
2012	African Championships	Porto-Novo, Benin	1st	800 m	1:43.88
2012	Olympic Games	London, United Kingdom	1st	1500 m	3:34.08
2015	World Championships	Beijing, China	4th	1500 m	3:34.76
2015	African Games	Brazzaville, Republic of the Congo	2nd	800 m	1:50.72
2016	Olympic Games	Rio de Janeiro, Brazil	2nd	800 m	1:42.61 NR
2016	Olympic Games	Rio de Janeiro, Brazil	2nd	1500 m	3:50.11
2019	World Championships	Doha, Qatar	2nd	1500 m	3:31.38
