= 2014 African Championships in Athletics – Men's 800 metres =

The men's 800 metres event at the 2014 African Championships in Athletics was held August 11–12 on Stade de Marrakech.

== Medalists ==
Gold	Silver	Bronze
Nijel Amos; Botswana	Mohammed Aman; Ethiopia	Taoufik Makhloufi; Algeria

== Results ==
=== Heats ===
Qualification: First 2 of each heat (Q) and the next 2 fastest (q) qualified for the final.

Rank	Heat	Name	Nationality	Time	Notes
1	1	Ferguson Cheruiyot Rotich	Kenya	1:45.80	Q
2	1	Amine El Manaoui	Morocco	1:46.01	Q
3	1	Antoine Gakeme	Burundi	1:46.24	q
4	2	Mohammed Aman	Ethiopia	1:46.63	Q
5	1	Alberto Mamba	Mozambique	1:46.68	q, NR
6	2	Nijel Amos	Botswana	1:46.73	Q
7	2	Cornelius Kiplagat	Kenya	1:46.81	
8	1	Jena Umar	Ethiopia	1:47.09	
9	2	Moussa Camara	Mali	1:47.14	
10	2	Nader Belhanbel	Morocco	1:47.43	
11	3	Evans Kipkorir	Kenya	1:48.66	Q
12	3	Taoufik Makhloufi	Algeria	1:48.90	Q
13	1	Hamid Sulema Ferej	Eritrea	1:49.17	
14	3	Mamush Lencha	Ethiopia	1:49.90	
15	2	Jammeh Omar	Gambia	1:49.96	
16	2	Prince Mumba	Zambia	1:51.02	
17	3	Redouane Baaziri	Morocco	1:51.06	
18	3	Attoumane Abdoul Had	Comoros	1:55.09	
19	3	Hamza Shlik	Libya	1:55.77	
20	3	Junior Bele	Republic of the Congo	2:00.66	
	1	Bechir Ahmat Mahamat	Chad	DNS	

=== Final ===
Rank	Name	Nationality	Time	Notes
1st place, gold medalist(s)	Nijel Amos	Botswana	1:48.54	
2nd place, silver medalist(s)	Mohammed Aman	Ethiopia	1:48.74	
3rd place, bronze medalist(s)	Taoufik Makhloufi	Algeria	1:49.08	
4	Ferguson Cheruiyot Rotich	Kenya	1:49.10	
5	Evans Kipkorir	Kenya	1:49.47	
6	Alberto Mamba	Mozambique	1:49.63	
7	Antoine Gakeme	Burundi	1:49.74	
8	Amine El Manaoui	Morocco	1:49.93	
