= Rynardt van Rensburg =

South African middle-distance runner

Reinhardt van Rensburg
Personal information
- Born: 23 March 1992 (age 34) Kroonstad, South Africa
- Education: University of the Free State
- Height: 1.85 m (6 ft 1 in)
- Weight: 73 kg (161 lb)

Sport
- Sport: Track and field
- Event: 800 metres
Medal record
Men's athletics
Representing South Africa
African Championships
Bronze medal – third place	2016 Durban	800 m
- Updated on 29 August 2015

Reinhardt van Rensburg (born 23 March 1992) is a South African middle-distance runner competing primarily in the 800 metres. He represented his country at the 2015 World Championships in Beijing without advancing from the first round. In addition, he won the bronze medal at the 2015 Summer Universiade.

His personal best in the event is 1:45.33 set in Rio de Janeiro at the 2016 Summer Olympics.

== Competition record ==
Year	Competition	Venue	Position	Event	Notes
Representing South Africa
2012	African Championships	Porto-Novo, Benin	13th (h)	800 m	1:50.12
2013	Universiade	Kazan, Russia	6th	800 m	1:47.70
2015	Universiade	Gwangju, South Korea	3rd	800 m	1:49.30
2015	World Championships	Beijing, China	33rd (h)	800 m	1:48.61
2016	African Championships	Durban, South Africa	3rd	800 m	1:46.15
2016	Olympic Games	Rio de Janeiro, Brazil	13th (sf)	800 m	1:45.33
2017	Universiade	Taipei, Taiwan	8th	800 m	1:49.70
