= Athletics at the 2013 Summer Universiade – Men's 800 metres =

The men's 800 metres event at the 2013 Summer Universiade was held on 10–12 July.

== Medalists ==
Gold	Silver	Bronze
Nijel Amos; Botswana	Jozef Repčík; Slovakia	Andreas Vojta; Austria

== Results ==
=== Heats ===
Qualification: First 3 in each heat and 6 best performers advanced to the semifinals.

Rank	Heat	Name	Nationality	Time	Notes
1	5	Kiril Simakov	Russia	1:50.80	Q
2	5	Sho Kawamoto	Japan	1:51.15	Q
3	3	Nijel Amos	Botswana	1:51.38	Q
4	3	Anthony Romaniw	Canada	1:51.41	Q
5	6	Ivan Nesterov	Russia	1:51.76	Q
6	3	Jozef Repčík	Slovakia	1:51.80	Q, SB
7	5	Dennis Chelimo	Kenya	1:52.01	Q
8	6	Johan Svensson	Sweden	1:52.04	Q
9	3	Jan Hochstrasser	Switzerland	1:52.07	q
10	6	Cristian Vorovenci	Romania	1:52.31	Q
11	5	Ashot Hayrapetyan	Armenia	1:52.66	q
12	2	Jean Ferrugem	Brazil	1:53.15	Q
13	4	Wesley Vázquez	Puerto Rico	1:53.27	Q
14	1	Emánuel Gutema	Hungary	1:53.46	Q
15	4	Shaquille Dill	Bermuda	1:53.56	Q
16	4	Alejandro Peirano	Chile	1:53.84	Q
17	4	Wilson Solano	Costa Rica	1:53.84	q
18	2	Rynardt van Rensburg	South Africa	1:53.94	Q
19	2	Ivan Obezchik	Kazakhstan	1:53.96	Q
20	1	Andreas Vojta	Austria	1:54.44	Q
21	1	Vitalij Kozlov	Lithuania	1:54.80	q
22	3	Farkhod Kuralov	Tajikistan	1:55.19	q
22	6	Jaad Ahmed Aballa	Qatar	1:55.19	q
24	1	Katlego Maotwe	Botswana	1:56.13	q
25	2	Nimet Gashi	Albania	1:56.32	
26	1	Dalerjoni Haydar	Tajikistan	1:58.00	
27	2	Henry Stevens-Carty	Bermuda	1:58.27	
28	5	Erkinbek Moldobaev	Kyrgyzstan	1:59.25	
29	3	Ahmad Ghalie	Lebanon	1:59.38	
30	2	Kushtarbek Tashtanbekov	Kyrgyzstan	1:59.89	
31	6	Kaarel Lilleoja	Estonia	1:59.96	
32	3	Neeraj Chulliparambil	India	2:01.54	
33	6	Balla Sanogo	Mali	2:02.89	
34	2	Said Al-Mandhari	Oman	2:03.08	
35	1	Jesús Herrera	Colombia	2:08.38	
36	4	Ibrahima Mbengue	Senegal	2:15.27	
37	5	Frederick Uhrle	American Samoa	2:16.27	
	5	Othman Al-Busaidi	Oman	DQ	
	6	Bawileng Adoum	Chad	DQ	
	1	Raimond Valler	Estonia	DNS	
	4	Alex Ngouari Mouissi	Republic of the Congo	DNS	
	5	Leoman Momoh	Nigeria	DNS	

=== Semifinals ===
Qualification: First 2 in each heat and 2 best performers advanced to the final.

Rank	Heat	Name	Nationality	Time	Notes
1	1	Anthony Romaniw	Canada	1:47.44	Q
2	1	Wesley Vázquez	Puerto Rico	1:47.56	Q
3	1	Shaquille Dill	Bermuda	1:47.76	q, PB
4	3	Nijel Amos	Botswana	1:48.00	Q
5	3	Ivan Nesterov	Russia	1:48.04	Q
6	3	Rynardt van Rensburg	South Africa	1:48.35	q
7	1	Ivan Obezchik	Kazakhstan	1:48.49	PB
8	3	Sho Kawamoto	Japan	1:48.56	
9	3	Cristian Vorovenci	Romania	1:48.73	SB
10	1	Alejandro Peirano	Chile	1:49.19	PB
11	2	Jozef Repčík	Slovakia	1:49.75	Q, SB
12	2	Andreas Vojta	Austria	1:49.85	Q
13	2	Kiril Simakov	Russia	1:50.15	
14	1	Jean Ferrugem	Brazil	1:50.16	
14	3	Johan Svensson	Sweden	1:50.16	
16	2	Jan Hochstrasser	Switzerland	1:50.44	
17	3	Dennis Chelimo	Kenya	1:50.61	
18	1	Ashot Hayrapetyan	Armenia	1:50.73	
19	2	Emánuel Gutema	Hungary	1:51.09	
20	3	Farkhod Kuralov	Tajikistan	1:53.02	
21	1	Vitalij Kozlov	Lithuania	1:53.48	
22	2	Wilson Solano	Costa Rica	1:54.22	
23	2	Jaad Ahmed Aballa	Qatar	2:02.24	
	2	Katlego Maotwe	Botswana	DQ	

=== Final ===
Rank	Name	Nationality	Time	Notes
1st place, gold medalist(s)	Nijel Amos	Botswana	1:46.53	
2nd place, silver medalist(s)	Jozef Repčík	Slovakia	1:47.30	SB
3rd place, bronze medalist(s)	Andreas Vojta	Austria	1:47.31	
4	Wesley Vázquez	Puerto Rico	1:47.33	
5	Ivan Nesterov	Russia	1:47.58	
6	Rynardt van Rensburg	South Africa	1:47.70	
7	Anthony Romaniw	Canada	1:49.04	
8	Shaquille Dill	Bermuda	1:49.80	
