= Jacob Rozani =

South African middle-distance runner

Personal information
- Nationality: South Africa
- Born: 24 January 1988 (age 38)

Sport
- Country: South Africa
- Sport: Athletics
- Event: 800 m
Medal record
Men's athletics
Representing South Africa
African Championships
Silver medal – second place	2016 Durban	800 m
- Updated on 27 August 2016

Jacob Rozani (born 24 January 1988) is a South African middle distance runner.

Rozani took first in the 800 meters at the 2014 South African Athletics Championships.

Rozani took second in the 800 meters at the 2016 African Championships in Athletics. In this finish, he earned the qualifying standard for the 2016 Olympics.

At the 2016 Summer Olympics, he finished 5th in his heat for the 800 m with a time of 1:49.79. He did not qualify for the semifinals.
