= Nader Belhanbel =

Moroccan middle-distance runner

Nader Belhanbel (born 1 July 1994) is a Moroccan athlete competing primarily in the 800 metres. He reached the final at the 2015 World Championships.

His personal best in the event is 1:44.64 from 2015.

== Competition record ==
Year	Competition	Venue	Position	Event	Notes
Representing Morocco
2011	World Youth Championships	Lille, France	21st (sf)	800 m	1:52.45
2013	African Junior Championships	Bambous, Mauritius	3rd	800 m	1:48.49
2013	Jeux de la Francophonie	Nice, France	3rd	800 m	1:47.72
2013	Islamic Solidarity Games	Palembang, Indonesia	3rd	800 m	1:47.81
2014	African Championships	Marrakesh, Morocco	10th (h)	800 m	1:47.43
2015	Arab Championships	Isa Town, Bahrain	3rd	800 m	1:47.68
2015	World Championships	Beijing, China	7th	800 m	1:47.08

== Personal bests ==
Outdoor

- 800 metres – 1:44.64 (Barcelona 2015)
- 1500 metres – 3:37.61 (Padua 2013)

Indoor

- 1000 metres – 2:19.24 (Metz 2014)
