= Alberto Mamba =

Mozambican athlete

Alberto Mamba (born 9 October 1994) is a Mozambican athlete competing primarily in the 800 metres. He won two gold medals at the 2014 Lusophony Games.

His personal best in the event is 1:46.32 set in Oslo in 2016. It is the current national record.

== Competition record ==
Year	Competition	Venue	Position	Event	Notes
Representing Mozambique
2011	World Youth Championships	Lille, France	23rd (h)	800 m	1:53.68
2012	World Junior Championships	Barcelona, Spain	45th (h)	800 m	1:52.91
2013	African Junior Championships	Bambous, Mauritius	4th	800 m	1:49.29
2014	Lusophony Games	Panaji, India	1st	800 m	1:53.96
2014	Lusophony Games	Panaji, India	1st	1500 m	4:06.90
2014	Commonwealth Games	Glasgow, United Kingdom	8th (sf)	800 m	1:47.73
2014	African Championships	Marrakesh, Morocco	6th	800 m	1:49.63
2015	African Games	Brazzaville, Republic of the Congo	7th	800 m	1:52.15
2016	African Championships	Durban, South Africa	5th	800 m	1:46.34
2017	Islamic Solidarity Games	Baku, Azerbaijan	–	800 m	DQ
2018	Commonwealth Games	Gold Coast, Australia	13th (h)	800 m	1:48.19
