= Anthony Chemut =

Kenyan middle-distance runner

Personal information
- Nationality: Kenyan
- Born: 17 December 1992 (age 33)
- Height: 1.61 m (5 ft 3 1/2 in)
- Weight: 68 kg (150 lb)

Sport
- Sport: Running
- Event: 800 metres

Achievements and titles
- Personal best: 800 m: 1:43.96 (Nairobi 2012)
Medal record
Men's athletics
Representing Kenya
African Championships
Silver medal – second place	2012 Porto-Novo	800 m

Anthony Chemut (born 17 December 1992) is a Kenyan middle distance runner that specialises in the 800 metres. He was part of the Kenyan team for the 2012 Summer Olympics.

== Competition record ==
Year	Competition	Venue	Position	Event	Notes
Representing Kenya
2009	World Youth Championships	Brixen, Italy	15th (h)	400 m	48.60
2011	African Junior Championships	Gaborone, Botswana	2nd	800 m	1:47.16
2011	African Junior Championships	Gaborone, Botswana	2nd	4 × 400 m relay	3:10.17
2012	African Championships	Porto-Novo, Benin	2nd	800 m	1:44.53
2012	Olympic Games	London, United Kingdom	14th (sf)	800 m	1:45.63
2013	World Championships	Moscow, Russia	15th (sf)	800 m	1:46.06
2013	World Championships	Moscow, Russia	23rd (h)	4 × 400 m relay	3:06.29
