= Collins Cheboi =

Kenyan middle-distance runner

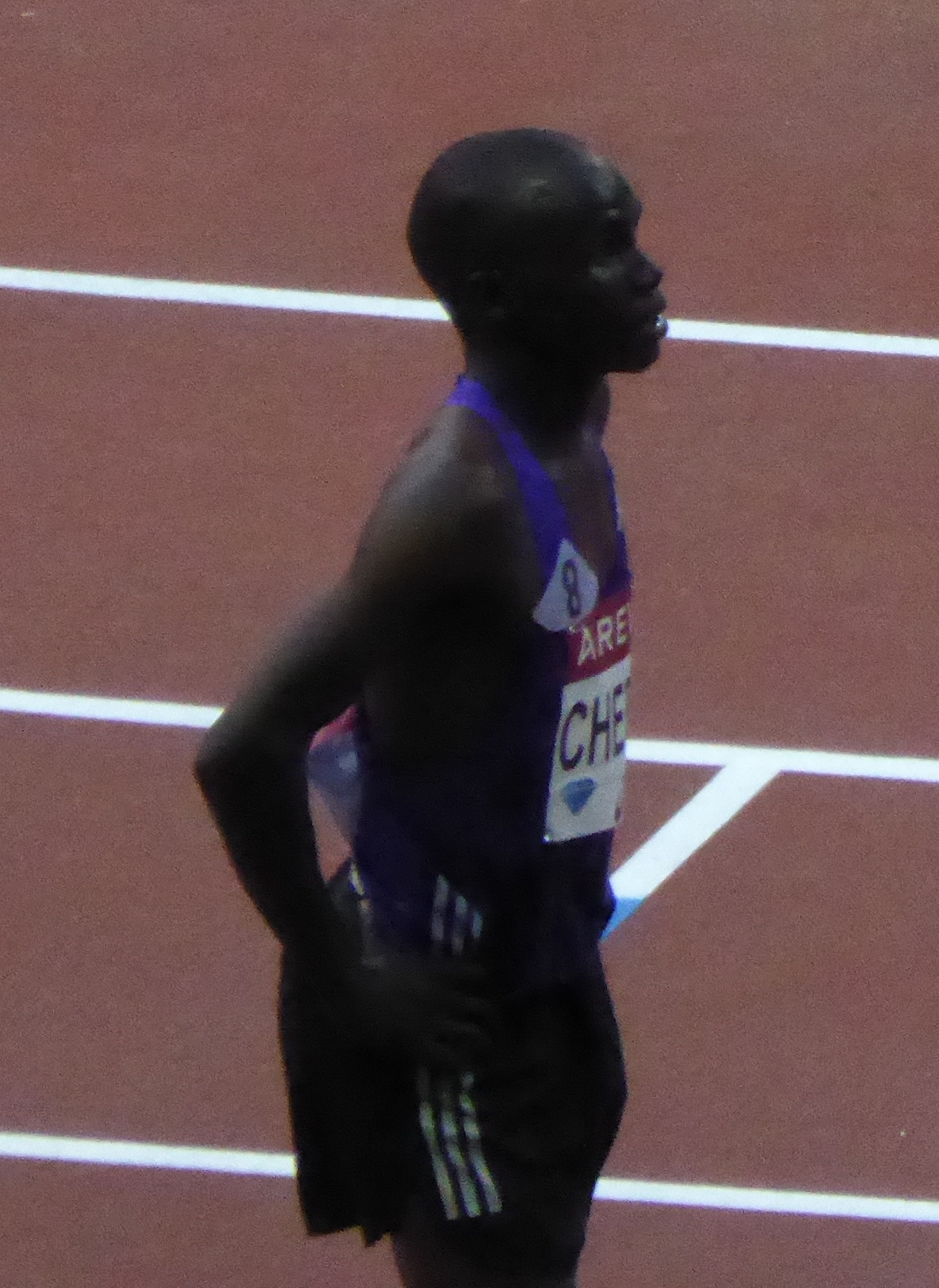
- Collins Cheboi in 2015

Medal record

Men's athletics

Representing Kenya

All-Africa Games
Silver medal – second place	2011 Maputo	1500 metres

IAAF World Relays
Gold medal – first place	2014 Nassau	4×1500 m relay

World University Games
Bronze medal – third place	2025 Bochum	5000 m

Collins Cheboi Kiprotich (born 25 September 1987) is a Kenyan middle-distance runner who specialises in the 1500 metres. His personal best for the event is 3:31.53 minutes.

He was a silver medallist at the 2011 All-Africa Games and was part of the world record-setting Kenyan 4 × 1500 metres relay team at the 2014 IAAF World Relays.

== Career ==
Cheboi competed abroad for the first time in 2009. He won the 1500 m at the Bislett Games that year, and also placed sixth at the Shanghai Golden Grand Prix. In 2010 he came sixth at the Kenyan Athletics Championships and ran a personal best of 3:34.17 minutes for fifth at the high-profile Athletissima meeting. On the circuit, he had one victory that year, at the Josef Odložil Memorial.

He acted as a pacemaker around this period but, still determined to compete, he continued after pacing at the Weltklasse in Karlsruhe to place third overall. Outdoors, he set a personal best of 3:33.82 minutes to win at the Rabat Meeting before going on to win the 1600 m race at the Stawell Gift. He came fourth at the national championships, then set a new best of 3:32.45 minutes to take fifth place at the Herculis meeting. He earned his first national selection that year and earned a silver medal at the 2011 All-Africa Games, coming 1500 m runner-up behind fellow Kenyan Caleb Ndiku.

In the 2012 season Cheboi set three personal bests: 3:36.43 minutes indoors, 3:32.08 minutes outdoors, and 3:51.44 minutes for the mile run. He ran frequently on the 2012 IAAF Diamond League circuit, but failed to make the top three in any race. An eighth-place finish at the Kenyan Olympic trials meant he was not chosen for the Kenyan Olympic team. The 2013 held similar results, although he managed a third-place finish at the Shanghai Diamond League meet. His best run that season was 3:31.53 minutes at the Herculis race – this time ranked him the seventh fastest athlete in the world that year, but such as the calibre of the race he finished only sixth.

Cheboi set a new indoor best of 3:36.41 minutes to come third at the Russian Winter Meeting at the start of the following year. He was chosen to be part of the Kenyan 4 × 1500 metres relay team for the inaugural 2014 IAAF World Relays and the team (comprising Cheboi, Silas Kiplagat, James Magut and Asbel Kiprop) fulfilled their favourite status and set a world record time of 14:22.22 minutes, knocking fourteen seconds off the previous mark.

== Personal bests ==
- 1500 metres – 3:31.53 minutes (2013)
- 1500 metres (indoor) – 3:36.41 minutes (2014)
- Mile run – 3:51.44 minutes (2012)
- 3000 metres – 7:45.32 minutes (2016)
- 5000 metres – 13:51.3 minutes (2013)

== International competition record ==
Year	Competition	Venue	Position	Event	Notes
2011	All-Africa Games	Maputo, Mozambique	2nd	1500 metres	
2014	IAAF World Relays	Nassau, Bahamas	1st	4 × 1500 m relay	
