= Timothy Kitum =

Kenyan middle-distance runner

Personal information
- Nationality: Kenyan
- Born: 20 November 1994 (age 31) Kapsowar
- Height: 5 ft 7.5 in (172 cm)
- Weight: 132 lb (60 kg)

Sport
- Sport: Track and field
- Event: 800 metres

Achievements and titles
- Personal best: 800 m: 1:42.53 (London 2012)
Medal record
Men's athletics
Representing Kenya
Olympic Games
Bronze medal – third place	2012 London	800 m
World Junior Championships
Silver medal – second place	2012 Barcelona	800 m
World Youth Championships
Bronze medal – third place	2011 Lille	800 m

Timothy Kitum (born 20 November 1994) is a Kenyan middle distance runner.

He won a silver medal in the 800 m at the 2012 World Junior Championships in Athletics in Barcelona, finishing second to Nijel Amos, before going on to win the bronze medal in the men's 800m race at the 2012 Summer Olympics. Kitum also won the 800m at the Commonwealth Youth Games with a Games Record of 1:49.32.

== Personal life ==
Kitum is married to Faith Kipyegon. Their daughter, Alyn, was born in June 2018.
