= Moussa Camara (athlete) =

Malian middle-distance runner

Moussa Camara (born 12 February 1988, Bamako) is a Malian athlete specializing in the 800 metres.

He competed for Mali at the 2012 Summer Olympics failing to qualify for the semifinals. These were his first Olympics. During this time he trained in Kenya his own country experienced the 2012 Malian coup d'état, which has weighed on him.

== Competition record ==
Year	Competition	Venue	Position	Event	Notes
Representing Mali
2005	World Youth Championships	Marrakesh, Morocco	43rd (h)	800 m	1:58.82
2007	African Junior Championships	Ouagadougou, Burkina Faso	19th (h)	800 m	1:52.60
2010	World Indoor Championships	Doha, Qatar	23rd (h)	800 m	1:55.84
2011	World Championships	Daegu, South Korea	22nd (sf)	800 m	1:48.15
2011	All-Africa Games	Maputo, Mozambique	9th (h)	800 m	1:49.99
2012	World Indoor Championships	Istanbul, Turkey	19th (h)	800 m	1:52.62
2012	African Championships	Porto-Novo, Benin	8th	800 m	1:49.12
2012	Olympic Games	London, United Kingdom	45th (h)	800 m	1:51.36
2013	World Championships	Moscow, Russia	39th (h)	800 m	1:49.78
2013	Jeux de la Francophonie	Nice, France	7th	800 m	1:50.38
2014	African Championships	Marrakesh, Morocco	9th (h)	800 m	1:47.14
2014	African Championships	Marrakesh, Morocco	16th (h)	1500 m	3:56.90
2015	African Games	Brazzaville, Republic of the Congo	14th (h)	800 m	1:51.81
2016	African Championships	Durban, South Africa	9th (sf)	800 m	1:51.59
2016	African Championships	Durban, South Africa	15th (h)	1500 m	3:54.76
