= Nemanja Kojić (runner) =

Serbian middle-distance track athlete (born 1994)

Personal information
- Nationality: Serbian
- Born: June 9, 1994 (age 32) Čačak, Yugoslavia

Sport
- Sport: Track
- Event: 800 metres
- Club: AK Sloboda Čačak

Achievements and titles
- Personal best: 800 metres: 1:49.10

Nemanja Kojić (Serbian Cyrillic: Немања Којић, born 9 June 1994) is a Serbian middle-distance track athlete who specializes in the 800 metres discipline. He represented Serbia at the 2013 Mediterranean Games. He trains with Atletski Klub "Sloboda" from Čačak.

== Running career ==
Kojić's first appearance in international competition took place when he ran in the second heat of the boy's 800 metres at the 2011 World Youth Championships in Athletics, running a time of 1:54.97 (min:sec). Just a few weeks later, he finished the 800 metre in second place at the 2011 European Youth Summer Olympic Festival, recording a time of 1:51.55.

A year later, Kojić ran the men's 800-m race at the 2012 World Junior Championships in Athletics with a time of 1:54.79. In December 2012, he was named "Male Sportsperson of Čačak" after successful indoor and outdoor track seasons that year.

In June 2013, he finished second in the Second League 800 metres race in a time of 1:52.63 at the 2013 European Team Championships. Only a week later, at the 2013 Mediterranean Games, he ran the first heat of the 800 metre and recorded a personal best time of 1:49.10 in the 800, even beating Giordano Benedetti. It was his first time running under 1:50 at the age of 19.

In September 2015, he was banned from the sport for two years by the Anti-Doping Agency of Serbia after a positive test for Furosemide, a banned diuretic.
