= Nijel Amos =

Botswana middle-distance runner

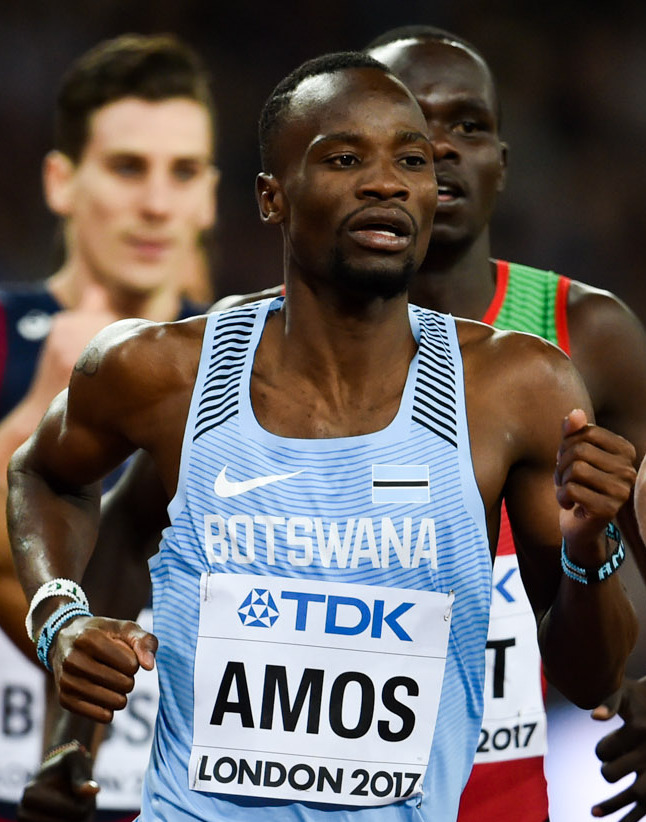
- Amos at the 2017 World Championships in Athletics in London

Personal information
- Born: 15 March 1994 (age 32) Marobela, Botswana
- Height: 1.79 m (5 ft 10 in)
- Weight: 67 kg (148 lb)

Sport
- Country: Botswana
- Sport: Athletics
- Event: 800 metres

Achievements and titles
- Personal bests: 400 m: 44.99 (Padua 2019); 800 m: 1:41.73 WU20R NR (London 2012); 1500 m: 3:44.04 (Irvine 2021)
Medal record
Men's athletics
Representing Botswana
Olympic Games
Silver medal – second place	2012 London	800 m
Diamond League
First place	2014	800 m
First place	2015	800 m
First place	2017	800 m
Commonwealth Games
Gold medal – first place	2014 Glasgow	800 m
All-Africa Games
Gold medal – first place	2015 Brazzaville	800 m
African Championships
Gold medal – first place	2014 Marrakesh	800 m
Gold medal – first place	2014 Marrakesh	4×400 m
Gold medal – first place	2016 Durban	800 m
Gold medal – first place	2018 Asaba	800 m
Universiade
Gold medal – first place	2013 Kazan	800 m
World Junior Championships
Gold medal – first place	2012 Barcelona	800 m
African Junior Championships
Bronze medal – third place	2011 Gaborone	800 m
Commonwealth Youth Games
Bronze medal – third place	2011 Douglas	800 m
Representing Africa
Continental Cup
Gold medal – first place	2014 Marrakesh	800 m
Bronze medal – third place	2018 Ostrava	800 m

Nijel Carlos Amilfitano Amos (born 15 March 1994) is a Botswana middle-distance runner who competes in the 800 metres. He won the silver medal at the 2012 London Olympics, which was Botswana's first-ever Olympic medal. Amos claimed gold medals at the 2014 Commonwealth Games and 2015 All-Africa Games. At the African Championships in Athletics, he took golds in 2014, 2016 and 2018.

He won the gold medal in his specialist event at the 2012 World Under-20 Championships. Amos is the Botswana record holder for the 800m; his mark is also the world U20 record. He is a three-time Diamond League 800m winner.

On 12 July 2022, Amos was provisionally suspended from competition for testing positive for metabolite GW1516. On 3 May 2023, it was announced that he had received a backdated three-year doping ban, which would end on 11 July 2025.

== Early life ==
Nijel Amos hails from Marobela village in the north-eastern part of Botswana. He attended Shangano Community Junior Secondary School (2007 to 2009) in Nshakashongwe and Tutume McConnell Community College (2010 to 2011).

== Running career ==
At the 2011 African Junior Athletics Championships, Amos ran a Botswana junior 800 metres record of 1:47.28. Further improving on his record, Amos finished fifth in the event at the 2011 World Youth Championships in Athletics.

In 2012, Amos improved his national senior record to 1:43.11 during a race in Mannheim. He became champion at the 2012 World Junior Championships in Athletics, finishing in a new championship record of 1:43.79. At the 2012 London Olympics, Amos won a silver medal in the men's 800m event, the first Olympic medal for his country. His time of 1:41.73 established a new world junior record behind the new world record set by David Rudisha, and is currently tied with Sebastian Coe as the eighth fastest individual in the history of the event.

After an injury-filled 2013 season, Amos returned to form in 2014. At the Prefontaine Classic Diamond League meet, he set a meet record and world-leading time of 1:43.63. At the Monaco Diamond League, he again set a meet record and world leading mark of 1:42.45. Beating Rudisha for the second time in the season, his performance was the fastest 800m race since the 2012 Olympic final. At the Glasgow Commonwealth Games, Amos won the 800m gold medal in 1:45.18. In the tactical affair, he manoeuvred out of a box to pass world record holder David Rudisha in the last 50 metres.

At the 2016 Rio Olympics, Amos competed in the 800m and 4 × 400 m relay. He finished seventh in his heat in his individual event and did not qualify for the semi-finals. The Botswana 4 × 400m relay team finished fifth in the finals. Amos was the flag bearer for Botswana during the Parade of Nations.

He finished fifth in the 800m at the 2017 World Championships in Athletics in London.

Amos ran a 1:42.14 in the summer of 2018 at the Monaco Diamond League meet, taking first place. It was his best race in the 800m since his silver medal effort in the 2012 Olympics.

At the 2019 Monaco Diamond League, he ran 1:41.89, hitting 600m at 1:15.22.

At the delayed 2020 Tokyo Olympics, Amos competed in the 800m event, finishing first in his heat. In the semi-final, he collided with Isaiah Jewett, resulting in them both falling to the ground. Jewett helped Amos to his feet in a sportsmanship scene that was later repeated in commercials. The two jogged across the finish line, Amos being granted a place in the final by the referee.

=== 2023: Doping Suspension ===
On 12 July 2022, Amos was provisionally suspended from competition by the Athletics Integrity Unit after he tested positive for GW1516, a banned hormone and metabolic modulator that is not approved for use in humans. On 3 May 2023, it was announced that he had received backdated three-year doping ban which would end on 11 July 2025.

== Achievements ==
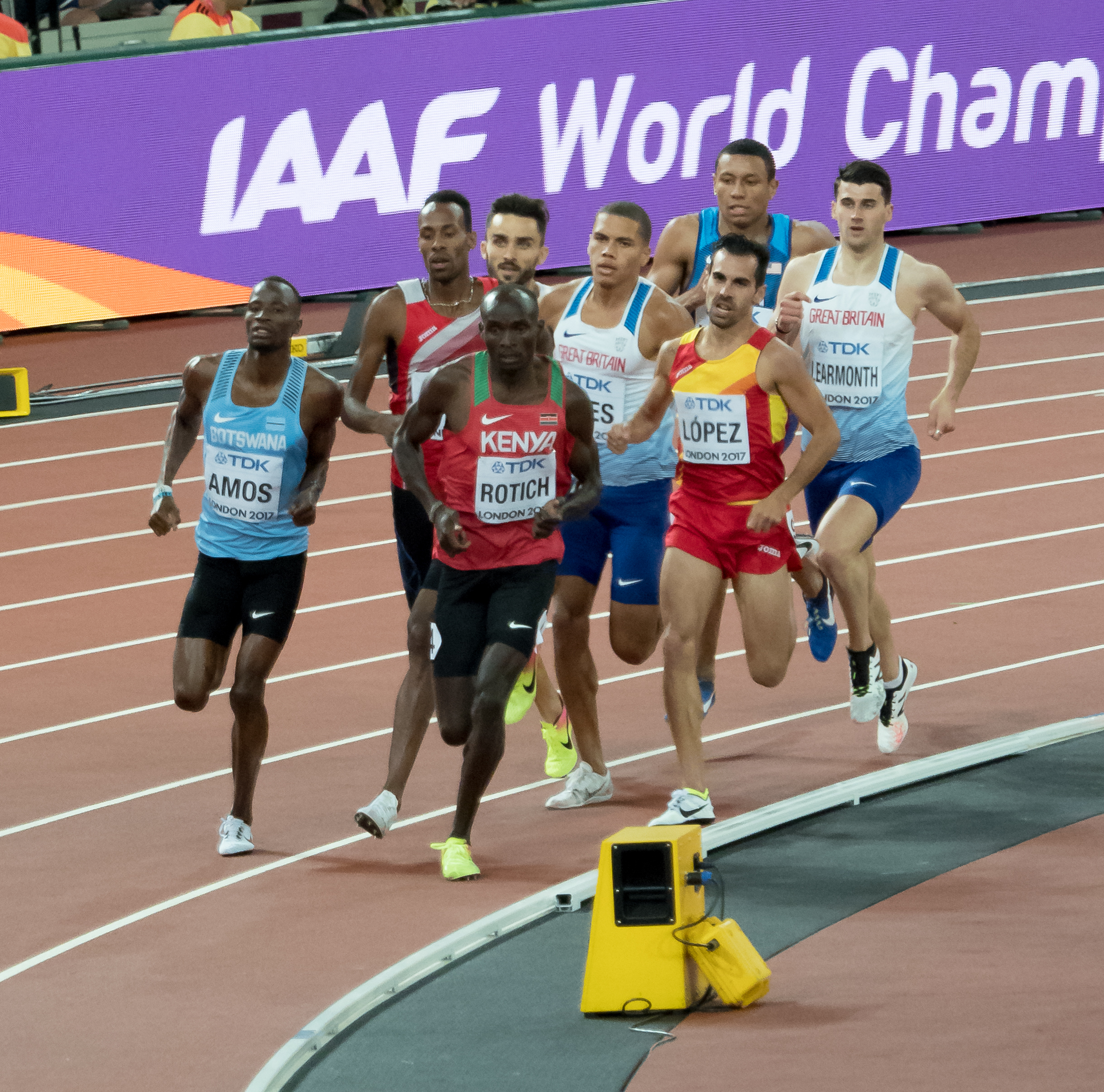
Amos (L in blue) races the 800 m at the 2017 World Championships in Athletics in London, where he finished fifth.

All information taken from World Athletics profile.

=== International competitions ===
Representing Botswana
Year	Competition	Venue	Position	Event	Time
2011	African Junior Championships	Gaborone, Botswana	3rd	800 m	1:47.38 NJR
2011	World Youth Championships	Villeneuve-d'Ascq, France	5th	800 m	1:47.28 PB
2012	African Championships	Porto-Novo, Benin	– (h)	800 m	DNS
2012	African Championships	Porto-Novo, Benin	– (f)	4 × 400 m relay	DQ
2012	World Junior Championships	Barcelona, Spain	1st	800 m	1:43.79 CR
2012	Olympic Games	London, United Kingdom	2nd	800 m	1:41.73 WJR NR
2013	Universiade	Kazan, Russia	– (h)	400 m	DNF
2013	Universiade	Kazan, Russia	1st	800 m	1:46.53
2014	Commonwealth Games	Glasgow, United Kingdom	1st	800 m	1:45.18
2014	African Championships	Marrakesh, Morocco	1st	800 m	1:48.54
2014	African Championships	Marrakesh, Morocco	1st	4 × 400 m relay	3:01.89 NR
2014	Continental Cup	Marrakesh, Morocco	1st	800 m	1:44.88
2015	World Championships	Beijing, China	17th (sf)	800 m	1:47.96
2015	World Championships	Beijing, China	9th (h)	4 × 400 m relay	2:59.95 NR
2015	African Games	Brazzaville, Congo Republic	1st	800 m	1:50.45
2015	African Games	Brazzaville, Congo Republic	2nd	4 × 400 m relay	3:00.95
2016	African Championships	Durban, South Africa	1st	800 m	1:45.11
2016	Olympic Games	Rio de Janeiro, Brazil	49th (h)	800 m	1:50.46
2017	World Championships	London, United Kingdom	5th	800 m	1:45.83
2017	World Championships	London, United Kingdom	14th (h)	4 × 400 m relay	3:06.50
2018	Commonwealth Games	Gold Coast, Australia	8th	800 m	1:48.45
2018	African Championships	Asaba, Nigeria	1st	800 m	1:45.20
2018	African Championships	Asaba, Nigeria	– (f)	4 × 400 m relay	DNF
2018	Continental Cup	Ostrava, Czech Republic	3rd	800 m	1:46.77
2019	World Championships	Doha, Qatar	– (h)	800 m	DNS
2021	Olympic Games	Tokyo, Japan	8th	800 m	1:46.41

=== Circuit wins and titles ===
- Diamond League Overall 800 metres winner: 2014, 2015
- Diamond League 800 metres champion: 2017

800 metres wins, other events specified in parentheses

- 2014 (3): Eugene Prefontaine Classic (WL MR), Monaco Herculis (WL MR), Zürich Weltklasse
- 2015 (3): Birmingham British Grand Prix, Lausanne Athletissima, London Anniversary Games
- 2016 (1): Doha Qatar Athletic Super Grand Prix (4 × 400 m relay)
- 2017 (5): Paris Meeting (SB), London (WL), Rabat Meeting International, Birmingham, Brussels Memorial Van Damme
- 2018 (1): Monaco (WL MR)
- 2019 (3): Doha (WL), Rabat, Monaco (WL MR)
- 2021 (1): Monaco (WL)

== See also ==
- Botswana at the 2012 Summer Olympics

Records
Preceded by Abubaker Kaki Khamis	Men's World Junior Record Holder, 800 metres 9 August 2012 – present	Incumbent
Olympic Games
Preceded by Amantle Montsho	Flagbearer for Botswana; Rio de Janeiro 2016	Succeeded by Amantle Montsho; Rajab Otukile Mahommed
