= 2011 World Youth Championships in Athletics – Boys' 800 metres =

Boys' 800 metres at the 2011 World Youth Championships in Athletics
- Venue: Stadium Lille Métropole
- Dates: 6 July (heats); 7 July (semifinal); 9 July (final)
- Competitors: 54
- Winning time: 1:44.08 WYB

Medalists
gold medal	Leonard Kirwa Kosencha	Kenya
silver medal	Mohammed Aman	Ethiopia
bronze medal	Timothy Kitum	Kenya

The boys' 800 metres at the 2011 World Youth Championships in Athletics was held at the Stadium Lille Métropole on 6, 7 and 9 July.

== Medalists ==
Gold	Silver	Bronze
Leonard Kirwa Kosencha; Kenya	Mohammed Aman; Ethiopia	Timothy Kitum; Kenya

== Records ==
Prior to the competition, the following records were as follows.

World Youth Best	Belal Mansoor Ali (BHR)	1:44.34	Conegliano, Italy	17 June 2005
Championship Record	Gilbert Keter Kipkurui (KEN)	1:48.42	Marrakesh, Morocco	15 July 2005
World Youth Leading	Mohammed Aman (ETH)	1:45.74	Montreuil-sous-Bois, France	7 June 2011

During the competition, Leonard Kirwa Kosencha lowered Belal Mansoor Ali's world youth best to 1:44.08, thereby establishing a new championship record, too.

== Heats ==
Qualification rule: first 3 of each heat (Q) plus the 3 fastest times (q) qualified.

=== Heat 1 ===
Rank	Lane	Name	Nationality	Time	Notes
1	6	Mohammed Aman	Ethiopia	1:53.17	Q
2	4	Nader Belhanbel	Morocco	1:53.44	Q
3	5	Mihn Kyun Cho	Denmark	1:53.54	Q, PB
4	7	Mihai Romas	Romania	1:53.73	
5	1	John Apolinário	Brazil	1:54.15	
6	2	Benjámin Ludvig	Hungary	1:54.30	PB
7	3	Ashley Riley	Bahamas	1:57.40	

=== Heat 2 ===
Rank	Lane	Name	Nationality	Time	Notes
1	4	Tyler Smith	Canada	1:51.64	Q
2	1	Cameron Thornton	United States	1:52.34	Q
3	6	William Gurton	Great Britain	1:52.80	Q
4	5	Kevin Angulo	Ecuador	1:54.69	
5	2	Nemanja Kojić	Serbia	1:54.97	
6	7	Zachary Ryan Devaraj	Singapore	1:57.36	
7	3	Aleksandr Kozinets	Estonia	1:59.04	PB
8	8	Brandon Parris	Saint Vincent and the Grenadines	1:59.48	

=== Heat 3 ===
Rank	Lane	Name	Nationality	Time	Notes
1	7	Hamza Driouch	Qatar	1:50.55	Q
2	4	Gaëtan Manceaux	France	1:52.30	Q
3	2	Nikolaus Franzmair	Austria	1:52.88	Q, PB
4	5	Luy de Lima	Brazil	1:53.73	
5	3	Riri Reste	Madagascar	1:55.30	PB
6	6	Alexandr Kurlov	Kazakhstan	1:58.83	
7	1	Faisal Abdo Majrashi	Saudi Arabia	2:02.11	

=== Heat 4 ===
Rank	Lane	Name	Nationality	Time	Notes
1	4	Abdelkerim Mohammed Hussein	Eritrea	1:51.01	Q, PB
2	3	Esrael Awoke	Ethiopia	1:51.75	Q
3	1	Elliot Slade	Great Britain	1:52.25	Q
4	2	Tre'tez Kinnaird	United States	1:52.81	q
5	6	Saúl Martínez	Spain	1:53.23	q
6	8	Alberto Mamba	Mozambique	1:53.68	PB
7	5	Andre Timothy Colebrook	Bahamas	1:55.38	
8	7	Dominik Stadlmann	Austria	1:56.47	

=== Heat 5 ===
Rank	Lane	Name	Nationality	Time	Notes
1	6	Leonard Kirwa Kosencha	Kenya	1:49.32	Q, PB
2	7	Brandon McBride	Canada	1:51.55	Q
3	1	Patrick Zwicker	Germany	1:51.64	Q
4	5	Andreas Almgren	Sweden	1:52.46	q
5	3	Mohamed Belbachir	Algeria	1:54.58	
6	2	Chibuzor Igiliegbe	Nigeria	1:57.97	
-	8	Artiom Cozacioc	Moldova	DQ	
-	2	Elnazeer Abdelgader	Sudan	DNS	

=== Heat 6 ===
Rank	Lane	Name	Nationality	Time	Notes
1	7	Wesley Vázquez	Puerto Rico	1:51.71	Q
2	2	Brecht Bertels	Belgium	1:52.53	Q
3	1	Jun Mitake	Japan	1:52.69	Q
4	5	Abdessalem Ayouni	Tunisia	1:53.81	PB
5	4	Ville Lampinen	Finland	1:53.99	
6	6	Ilie Macovei	Romania	1:54.84	
7	3	Nick Flammang	Luxembourg	1:55.18	PB
8	8	Sayed Ali	Kuwait	1:56.39	PB

=== Heat 7 ===
Rank	Lane	Name	Nationality	Time	Notes
1	1	Timothy Kitum	Kenya	1:52.63	Q
2	7	Nijel Amos	Botswana	1:52.72	Q
3	4	Patryk Wróbel	Poland	1:53.83	Q
4	2	Roald Frøskeland	Norway	1:54.27	
5	6	Víctor Emilio Ortiz	Costa Rica	1:54.28	PB
6	8	Daniel Andújar	Spain	1:54.83	
7	5	Komnen Cvijovic	Serbia	1:56.87	
8	3	Jerrad Mason	Barbados	1:59.32	

== Semifinals ==
Qualification rule: first 2 of each heat (Q) plus the 2 fastest times (q) qualified.

=== Heat 1 ===
Rank	Lane	Name	Nationality	Time	Notes
1	4	Hamza Driouch	Qatar	1:48.93	Q
2	5	Abdelkerim Mohammed Hussein	Eritrea	1:49.24	Q, PB
3	6	Esrael Awoke	Ethiopia	1:49.49	q
4	3	Brandon McBride	Canada	1:51.00	
5	8	Brecht Bertels	Belgium	1:51.28	
6	7	Jun Mitake	Japan	1:51.68	
7	1	William Gurton	Great Britain	1:52.42	
8	2	Saúl Martínez	Spain	1:52.86	PB

=== Heat 2 ===
Rank	Lane	Name	Nationality	Time	Notes
1	4	Leonard Kirwa Kosencha	Kenya	1:47.11	Q, CR
2	5	Mohammed Aman	Ethiopia	1:47.72	Q
3	3	Cameron Thornton	United States	1:49.64	
4	6	Tyler Smith	Canada	1:49.67	PB
5	8	Elliot Slade	Great Britain	1:52.25	
6	1	Andreas Almgren	Sweden	1:52.26	
7	7	Patryk Wróbel	Poland	1:53.70	
8	2	Mihn Kyun Cho	Denmark	1:54.38	

=== Heat 3 ===
Rank	Lane	Name	Nationality	Time	Notes
1	4	Nijel Amos	Botswana	1:48.54	Q
2	1	Timothy Kitum	Kenya	1:48.80	Q, PB
3	3	Wesley Vázquez	Puerto Rico	1:49.24	q
4	5	Patrick Zwicker	Germany	1:50.56	
5	6	Tre'tez Kinnaird	United States	1:50.64	
6	2	Nikolaus Franzmair	Austria	1:51.45	PB
7	8	Gaëtan Manceaux	France	1:51.63	
8	7	Nader Belhanbel	Morocco	1:52.45	

== Final ==
Rank	Lane	Name	Nationality	Time	Notes
1st place, gold medalist(s)	5	Leonard Kirwa Kosencha	Kenya	1:44.08	WYB
2nd place, silver medalist(s)	6	Mohammed Aman	Ethiopia	1:44.68	PB
3rd place, bronze medalist(s)	8	Timothy Kitum	Kenya	1:44.98	PB
4	4	Hamza Driouch	Qatar	1:46.39	PB
5	3	Nijel Amos	Botswana	1:47.28	PB
6	2	Esrael Awoke	Ethiopia	1:48.94	PB
7	7	Wesley Vázquez	Puerto Rico	1:51.25	
8	1	Abdelkerim Mohammed Hussein	Eritrea	1:51.85	
