= Leonard Kirwa Kosencha =

Kenyan middle-distance runner

Personal information
- Nationality: Kenyan
- Born: 21 August 1994 (age 32)

Sport
- Sport: Running
- Event: 800 metres

Achievements and titles
- Personal best: 800 m: 1:43.40 (Monaco 2012)
Medal record
Men's athletics
Representing Kenya
World Youth Championships
Gold medal – first place	2011 Lille	800 m
Commonwealth Youth Games
Silver medal – second place	2011 Douglas	800 m

Leonard Kirwa Kosencha (born 21 August 1994) is a Kenyan middle distance runner.

He won a gold medal at the 800 m at the 2011 World Youth Championships in Athletics. By running 1:44.08 at these Championships, he also broke Belal Mansoor Ali's old world youth best of 1:44.34, which had stood since June 17, 2005. Ethiopia's Mohammed Aman broke Kosencha's short-standing world youth best that September. He won the silver medal at the 2011 Commonwealth Youth Games that season.

He began the 2012 season well as he was runner-up to Mohammed Aman at the Colorful Daegu Meeting, then won the first 2012 IAAF Diamond League race in Shanghai.

== Personal bests ==
Event	Performance	Date	Venue
800 m	1:43.40 s	20 July 2012	Monaco

Records
Preceded by (Bahrain) Belal Mansoor Ali	Boys' World Youth Best Holder, 800 metres 9 July 2011 – 10 September 2011	Succeeded by (Ethiopia) Mohammed Aman
