= Boaz Kiplagat Lalang =

Kenyan middle-distance runner

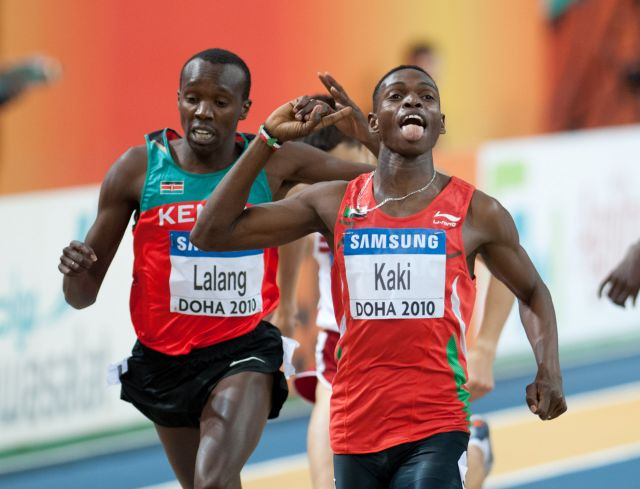
- Lalang taking World Indoor silver behind Abubaker Kaki

Personal information
- Born: 8 February 1989 (age 37)
Medal record
Men's athletics
Representing Kenya
Commonwealth Games
Gold medal – first place	2010 Delhi	800 m
World Indoor Championships
Silver medal – second place	2010 Doha	800 m
All-Africa Games
Silver medal – second place	2011 Maputo	800 m

Boaz Kiplagat Lalang (born 8 February 1989) is a Kenyan middle-distance runner, who specialises in the 800 metres. His younger brother, Lawi Lalang, ran for the University of Arizona.

== Career ==
At the 2008 Summer Olympics, Lalang barely missed running in the finals of the 800 m.

At the 2010 IAAF World Indoor Championships, he won a silver medal in the 800 m. He ran a mile personal best of 3:56.14 at the Drake Relays, defeating training partner and race favourite Bernard Lagat in the process and went on to lower his time to 3:52.18 in Oslo, Norway.

On 29 August 2010 he ran a personal best of 1:42.95 at the Rieti meeting in second place behind the new world record set by David Rudisha.

He studies Business Administration at Rend Lake College in Illinois. He has been mentored by Kenyan-born American runner Bernard Lagat.

== Competition record ==
Year	Competition	Venue	Position	Event	Notes
Representing Kenya
2008	Olympic Games	Olympic Games	7th (sf)	800 m	1:45.87
2010	World Indoor Championships	Doha, Qatar	2nd	800 m	1:46.39
2010	Commonwealth Games	New Delhi, India	1st	800 m	1:46.60
2011	All-Africa Games	Maputo, Mozambique	2nd	800 m	1:46.40
2012	World Indoor Championships	Istanbul, Turkey	12th (sf)	800 m	1:49.31

== Personal Bests ==
- 800 metres - 1:42.95 - Rieti, ITA, 29/08/2010
- 1000 Metres - 2:14.83 - Eugene, OR, 03/07/2010
- 1500 Metres - 3:35.80 - Rome, ITA, 10/06/2010
- Mile - 3:52.18 - Oslo, NOR, 04/06/2010
