= Mohammed Aman =

Ethiopian middle-distance runner

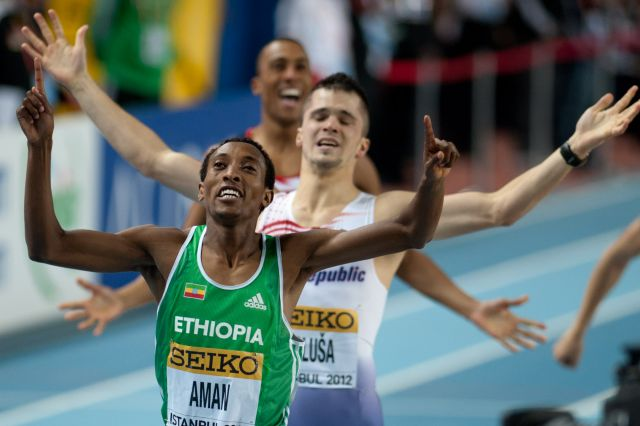
- Aman at the 2012 World Indoor Championships

Personal information
- Nationality: Ethiopian
- Born: 10 January 1994 (age 32)
- Height: 1.73 m (5 ft 8 in)
- Weight: 55 kg (121 lb)

Sport
- Sport: Track
- Events: 800 metres, 1000 metres

Achievements and titles
- Personal bests: 800 metres 1:42.37 (Brussels 2013); 1500 metres: 3:43.52; Mile: 3:57.14
Medal record
Men's athletics
Representing Ethiopia
World Championships
Gold medal – first place	2013 Moscow	800 m
World Indoor Championships
Gold medal – first place	2012 Istanbul	800 m
Gold medal – first place	2014 Sopot	800 m
African Championships
Silver medal – second place	2014 Marrakesh	800 m
African Junior Championships
Gold medal – first place	2009 Bambous	800 m
Gold medal – first place	2011 Gaborone	800 m
Summer Youth Olympics
Gold medal – first place	2010 Singapore	1000 m
World Youth Championships
Silver medal – second place	2011 Villeneuve-d'Ascq	800 m
Representing Africa
Continental Cup
Silver medal – second place	2014 Marrakesh	800 m

Mohammed Aman Geleto (Amharic: መሀመድ አማን; born 10 January 1994) is an Ethiopian middle-distance runner. Born in Asella, he is the winner of the 800-meter final at the 2013 World Athletics Championships in the Luzhniki stadium in Moscow. Aman also won consecutive 800 m titles at the 2009 and 2011 African Junior Athletics Championships.

Aman is currently serving a 4-year competition ban set to end in August 2028 for an anti-doping rule violation relating to an evaded test in 2021.

== Running career ==
Aman was the inaugural winner of the 1000 metres race at the 2010 Youth Olympics in Singapore. He won a silver medal in the 800 m at the 2011 World Youth Championships in Athletics, coming in secong behind Leonard Kirwa Kosencha who set a world youth record. He ran an Ethiopian record to win his semi-final heat at the 2011 World Championships in Athletics, but finished last in the event final.

In September he improved his Ethiopian record to 1:43.37 behind David Rudisha at the Rieti Meeting, then ended Rudisha's 34-meet winning streak at the Notturna di Milano, beating him by seven hundredths of a second in a time of 1:43.50. Aman's time stood as a world under-18 record until 2025, when Cooper Lutkenhaus ran 1:42.27.

He won 800 m final in the 2012 IAAF World Indoor Championships in Istanbul as the youngest gold medalist athlete.

He finished 6th in the 800 metres at the 2017 World Championships held in London.

== Competition record ==
Year	Competition	Venue	Position	Event	Notes
Representing Ethiopia
2009	African Junior Championships	Bambous, Mauritius	1st	800 m	1:48.82
2010	Youth Olympic Games	Singapore	1st	1000 m	2:19.54
2011	African Junior Championships	Gaborone, Botswana	1st	800 m	1:46.62
2011	World Youth Championships	Villeneuve-d'Ascq, France	2nd	800 m	1:44.68
2011	World Championships	Daegu, South Korea	8th	800 m	1:45.93
2012	World Indoor Championships	Istanbul, Turkey	1st	800 m	1:48.36
2012	Olympic Games	London, United Kingdom	6th	800 m	1:43.20
2013	World Championships	Moscow, Russia	1st	800 m	1:43.31
2014	World Indoor Championships	Sopot, Poland	1st	800 m	1:46.40
2014	African Championships	Marrakesh, Morocco	2nd	800 m	1:48.74
2015	World Championships	Beijing, China	—	800 m	DQ
2016	World Indoor Championships	Portland, United States	4th	800 m	1:47.97
2016	Olympic Games	Rio de Janeiro, Brazil	18th (sf)	800 m	1:46.14
2017	World Championships	London, United Kingdom	6th	800 m	1:46:06

== Personal best ==
	Performance	Date	Place
800 m	1:42.37	7 September 2013	Brussels
1000 m	2:19.54	22 August 2010	Singapore
1500 m	3:43.52	12 June 2011	Brazzaville
One Mile	3:57.14	4 June 2011	Eugene

Records
Preceded by (Kenya) Leonard Kirwa Kosencha	Boys' World Youth Best Holder, 800 metres 10 September 2011 – present	Incumbent
